= Dewberry (disambiguation) =

Dewberry is a group of species in the genus Rubus, closely related to the blackberries.

Dewberry may also refer to:

== Places ==
- Dewberry, Alberta, a village
- Dewberry, Indiana, an unincorporated community
- Dewberry Island, an island in Espiritu Santo Bay in Calhoun County, Texas

== Surname ==
- Charley Dewberry, American science writer
- Donna Dewberry (born 1953), American painter and author
- Frederick L. Dewberry (1921–1990), American politician
- John Dewberry, American football quarterback
- Kam Dewberry (born 2004), American football player
- Michelle Dewberry (born 1979), British businesswoman and contestant
- Thomas E. Dewberry (1951–2025), American politician
- William Dewberry (1874–1946), African-American baseball pitcher

== Other uses ==
- Dewberry (architecture firm), an American architecture and engineering firm that contributed to building General Wayne A. Downing Peoria International Airport
- Dewberry (Beaverdam, Virginia), a building on the National Register of Historic Places

== See also ==
- Dewsbury (disambiguation)
- Dubery
- Duberry
