= List of groups and wings of the United States Air National Guard =

This is a list of Wings in the United States Air Force Air National Guard.

== Active Air National Guard Wings ==
The active component United States Air Force operates three categories of wings: Combat Wings operate aircraft or missile systems in combat or combat support roles, or they are non-flying wings which perform or enable combat support functions; Institutional Wings are flying or non-flying wings which handle the long-term sustainability, pipeline generation, or developmental requirements of the Air Force; and Air Base Wings which are non-flying wings that maintain and operate a physical installation providing infrastructure support such as security forces, logistics and civil engineering to operate a base. The USAFR operates both Combat Wings and Institutional Wings.

Wings of the Air National Guard however are all classified as Combat Wings. There are two sub-types of Combat Wing: Combat Generation Wings (CGW) which provide deployable combat or combat support elements to Air Expeditionary Wings which employ those elements in combat; and In-Place Combat Wings (IPCW) which remain entirely at their home station and perform their combat or combat support missions or their enabling functions from home.

As there are no National Guard Institutional Wings, those National Guard wings which perform the same function as a USAF or USAFR Institutional Wing (137th SOW, 149th FW, 150th SOW, 162nd WG, 173rd FW and 189th AW) which all conduct Formal Training Unit (FTU) flying training are instead also classified as In-Place Combat wings.

Many Air National Guard Wings contain both; elements which are deployable, and elements which do not deploy remaining in-place at home. The classification of those wings is based on the preponderance of the different elements. A wing that is predominately in-place but has a small deployable unit is classed as an In-Place Combat Wing and vice-a-versa.

Wing or independent Group	(wing type)	(CGW) or (IPCW)	Shield	Location	Command	Gaining MAJCOM	Aircraft/Function
101st Air Refueling Wing	(ARW)	(CGW)		Bangor ANGB, Bangor, Maine	Maine Air National Guard	AMC	KC-135 Stratotanker
102nd Intelligence Wing	(IW)	(IPCW)		Otis ANGB, Sandwich, Massachusetts	Massachusetts Air National Guard	ACC	Intelligence
103rd Airlift Wing	(AW)	(CGW)		Bradley ANGB, East Granby, Connecticut	Connecticut Air National Guard	AMC	C-130 Hercules
104th Fighter Wing	(FW)	(CGW)		Barnes ANGB, Westfield, Massachusetts	Massachusetts Air National Guard	ACC	F-15C/D Eagle F-35 Lightning II
105th Airlift Wing	(AW)	(CGW)		Stewart ANGB, Newburgh, New York	New York Air National Guard	AMC	C-17 Globemaster III
106th Rescue Wing	(RQW)	(CGW)		Francis S. Gabreski ANGB, Westhampton Beach, New York	New York Air National Guard	ACC	HH-60W Jolly Green II, HC-130J Combat King II
107th Attack Wing	(ATKW)	(IPCW)		Niagara Falls ARS, Niagara Falls, New York	New York Air National Guard	ACC	MQ-9 Reaper
108th Wing	(WG)	(CGW)		JB McGuire-Dix-Lakehurst, New Jersey	New Jersey Air National Guard	AMC	C-32B Gatekeeper and associate to 305th AMW
109th Airlift Wing	(AW)	(CGW)		Stratton ANGB, Scotia, New York	New York Air National Guard	AMC	LC-130 Hercules
110th Wing	(WG)	(IPCW)		Battle Creek ANGB, Battle Creek, Michigan	Michigan Air National Guard	ACC	MQ-9 Reaper
111th Attack Wing	(ATKW)	(IPCW)		Biddle Air National Guard Base, Horsham, Pennsylvania	Pennsylvania Air National Guard	ACC	MQ-9 Reaper
113th Wing	(WG)	(CGW)		JB Andrews, Maryland	District of Columbia Air National Guard	ACC; AMC	F-16 Fighting Falcon C-40C Clipper
114th Fighter Wing	(FW)	(CGW)		Joe Foss Field ANGB, Sioux Falls, South Dakota	South Dakota Air National Guard	ACC	F-16 Fighting Falcon
115th Fighter Wing	(FW)	(CGW)		Truax Field ANGB, Madison, Wisconsin	Wisconsin Air National Guard	ACC	F-35 Lightning II
116th Air Control Wing	(ACW)	(CGW)		Robins AFB, Georgia	Georgia Air National Guard	ACC	Associate to 461st ACW
117th Air Refueling Wing	(ARW)	(CGW)		Sumpter Smith JNGB, Birmingham, Alabama	Alabama Air National Guard	AMC	KC-135 Stratotanker
118th Wing	(WG)	(IPCW)		Berry Field ANGB, Nashville, Tennessee	Tennessee Air National Guard	ACC	MQ-9 Reaper
119th Wing	(WG)	(IPCW)		North Dakota ANGB, Fargo, North Dakota	North Dakota Air National Guard	ACC	MQ-9 Reaper
120th Airlift Wing	(AW)	(CGW)		Great Falls ANGB, Great Falls, Montana	Montana Air National Guard	AMC	C-130 Hercules
121st Air Refueling Wing	(ARW)	(CGW)		Rickenbacker ANGB, Lockbourne, Ohio	Ohio Air National Guard	AMC	KC-135 Stratotanker
122nd Fighter Wing	(FW)	(CGW)		Fort Wayne ANGB, Fort Wayne, Indiana	Indiana Air National Guard	ACC	F-16 Fighting Falcon
123rd Airlift Wing	(AW)	(CGW)		Louisville IAP, Louisville, Kentucky	Kentucky Air National Guard	AMC	C-130 Hercules
124th Fighter Wing	(FW)	(CGW)		Gowen Field ANGB, Boise, Idaho	Idaho Air National Guard	ACC	A-10 Thunderbolt II
125th Fighter Wing	(FW)	(CGW)		Jacksonville ANGB, Jacksonville, Florida	Florida Air National Guard	ACC	F-35 Lightning II
126th Air Refueling Wing	(ARW)	(CGW)		Scott AFB, Illinois	Illinois Air National Guard	AMC	KC-135 Stratotanker
127th Wing	(WG)	(CGW)		Selfridge ANGB, Harrison Township, Michigan	Michigan Air National Guard	ACC AMC	A-10 Thunderbolt II; KC-135 Stratotanker
128th Air Refueling Wing	(ARW)	(CGW)		Mitchell ANGB, Milwaukee, Wisconsin	Wisconsin Air National Guard	AMC	KC-135 Stratotanker
129th Rescue Wing	(RQW)	(CGW)		Moffett Field, Sunnyvale, California	California Air National Guard	ACC	HH-60W Jolly Green II, HC-130J Combat King II
130th Airlift Wing	(AW)	(CGW)		McLaughlin ANGB, Charleston, West Virginia	West Virginia Air National Guard	AMC	C-130 Hercules
131st Bomb Wing	(BW)	(CGW)		Whiteman AFB, Missouri	Missouri Air National Guard	AFGSC	Associate to 509th BW
132nd Wing	(WG)	(IPCW)		Des Moines ANGB, Des Moines, Iowa	Iowa Air National Guard	ACC	MQ-9 Reaper
133rd Airlift Wing	(AW)	(CGW)		Minneapolis–Saint Paul JARS, Minneapolis, Minnesota	Minnesota Air National Guard	AMC	C-130 Hercules
134th Air Refueling Wing	(ARW)	(CGW)		McGhee Tyson ANGB, Alcoa, Tennessee	Tennessee Air National Guard	AMC	KC-135 Stratotanker
136th Airlift Wing	(AW)	(CGW)		NAS JRB Fort Worth, Fort Worth, Texas	Texas Air National Guard	AMC	C-130 Hercules
137th Special Operations Wing	(SOW)	(IPCW)		Will Rogers ANGB, Oklahoma City, Oklahoma	Oklahoma Air National Guard	AFSOC	OA-1K Sky Warden Formal Training Unit (FTU)
138th Fighter Wing	(FW)	(CGW)		Tulsa ANGB, Tulsa, Oklahoma	Oklahoma Air National Guard	ACC	F-16 Fighting Falcon
139th Airlift Wing	(AW)	(CGW)		Rosecrans ANGB, Saint Joseph, Missouri	Missouri Air National Guard	AMC	C-130 Hercules
140th Wing	(WG)	(CGW)		Buckley SFB, Aurora, Colorado	Colorado Air National Guard	ACC	F-16 Fighting Falcon
141st Air Refueling Wing	(ARW)	(CGW)		Fairchild AFB, Spokane, Washington	Washington Air National Guard	AMC	Associate to 92nd ARW
142nd Wing	(WG)	(CGW)		Portland ANGB, Portland, Oregon	Oregon Air National Guard	ACC	F-15C/D Eagle F-15EX Eagle II
143rd Airlift Wing	(AW)	(CGW)		Quonset ANGB, North Kingstown, Rhode Island	Rhode Island Air National Guard	AMC	C-130J Super Hercules
144th Fighter Wing	(FW)	(CGW)		Fresno ANGB, Fresno, California	California Air National Guard	ACC	F-15C/D Eagle F-15EX Eagle II
145th Airlift Wing	(AW)	(CGW)		Charlotte ANGB, Charlotte, North Carolina	North Carolina Air National Guard	AMC	C-17 Globemaster III
146th Airlift Wing	(AW)	(CGW)		Channel Islands ANGS, Port Hueneme, California	California Air National Guard	AMC	C-130J Super Hurcules
147th Attack Wing	(ATKW)	(IPCW)		Ellington Field JRB, Houston, Texas	Texas Air National Guard	ACC	MQ-9 Reaper
148th Fighter Wing	(FW)	(CGW)		Duluth ANGB, Duluth, Minnesota	Minnesota Air National Guard	ACC	F-16C Fighting Falcon
149th Fighter Wing	(FW)	(IPCW)		Joint Base San Antonio (Lackland AFB, Kelly Field), Texas	Texas Air National Guard	ACC (Note: 149th FW, 162nd WG & 173rd FW Gaining MAJCOM realigned to ACC from AETC 2026 along with active component fighter and MQ-9 FTU realignment from AETC to ACC)	F-16 Fighting Falcon Formal Training Unit (FTU)
150th Special Operations Wing	(SOW)	(IPCW)		Kirtland AFB, Albuquerque, New Mexico	New Mexico Air National Guard	AETC	HC-130J Combat King II Formal Training Unit (FTU)
151st Wing	(WG)	(CGW)		Roland R. Wright ANGB, Salt Lake City, Utah	Utah Air National Guard	AMC	KC-135 Stratotanker
152nd Airlift Wing	(AW)	(CGW)		Nevada ANGB, Reno, Nevada	Nevada Air National Guard	AMC	C-130 Hercules
153rd Airlift Wing	(AW)	(CGW)		Cheyenne ANGB, Cheyenne, Wyoming	Wyoming Air National Guard	AMC	C-130 Hercules
154th Wing	(WG)	(CGW)		JB Pearl Harbor–Hickam, Hawaii	Hawaii Air National Guard	PACAF	F-22 Raptor; KC-135 Stratotanker and Associate to 15th WG
155th Air Refueling Wing	(ARW)	(CGW)		Lincoln ANGB, Lincoln, Nebraska	Nebraska Air National Guard	AMC	KC-135 Stratotanker
156th Wing	(WG)	(CGW)		Muñiz ANGB, Carolina, Puerto Rico	Puerto Rico Air National Guard	AMC	Contingency response and combat communications
157th Air Refueling Wing	(ARW)	(CGW)		Pease ANGB, Portsmouth, New Hampshire	New Hampshire Air National Guard	AMC	KC-46 Pegasus
158th Fighter Wing	(FW)	(CGW)		Burlington ANGB, Burlington, Vermont	Vermont Air National Guard	ACC	F-35 Lightning II
159th Fighter Wing	(FW)	(CGW)		NAS JRB New Orleans, Belle Chasse, Louisiana	Louisiana Air National Guard	ACC	F-15C/D Eagle F-15EX Eagle II
161st Air Refueling Wing	(ARW)	(CGW)		Goldwater ANGB, Phoenix, Arizona	Arizona Air National Guard	AMC	KC-135 Stratotanker
162nd Wing	(WG)	(IPCW)		Morris ANGB, Tucson, Arizona	Arizona Air National Guard	ACC	F-16 Fighting Falcon Formal Training Units (FTU)s
163rd Attack Wing	(ATKW)	(IPCW)		March ARB, Riverside, California	California Air National Guard	ACC	MQ-9 Reaper
164th Airlift Wing	(AW)	(CGW)		Memphis ANGB, Memphis, Tennessee	Tennessee Air National Guard	AMC	C-17 Globemaster III
165th Airlift Wing	(AW)	(CGW)		Savannah ANGB (Travis Field), Savannah, Georgia	Georgia Air National Guard	AMC	C-130 Hercules
166th Airlift Wing	(AW)	(CGW)		New Castle ANGB, Wilmington, Delaware	Delaware Air National Guard	AMC	C-130 Hercules
167th Airlift Wing	(AW)	(CGW)		Shepherd Field ANGB, Martinsburg, West Virginia	West Virginia Air National Guard	AMC	C-17 Globemaster III
168th Wing	(WG)	(CGW)		Eielson AFB, Alaska	Alaska Air National Guard	PACAF	KC-135 Stratotanker
169th Fighter Wing	(FW)	(CGW)		McEntire JNGB, Eastover, South Carolina	South Carolina Air National Guard	ACC	F-16 Fighting Falcon
170th Group		(CGW)		Offutt AFB	Nebraska Air National Guard	ACC	Associate to 55th OG of the 55th WG
171st Air Refueling Wing	(ARW)	(CGW)		Pittsburgh ANGB, Pittsburgh, Pennsylvania	Pennsylvania Air National Guard	AMC	KC-135T Stratotanker
172nd Airlift Wing	(AW)	(CGW)		Allen C. Thompson Field ANGB, Jackson, Mississippi	Mississippi Air National Guard	AMC	C-17 Globemaster III
173rd Fighter Wing	(FW)	(IPCW)		Kingsley Field ANGB, Klamath Falls, Oregon	Oregon Air National Guard	ACC	F-35 Lightning II Formal Training Unit (FTU)
174th Attack Wing	(ATKW)	(IPCW)		Hancock Field ANGB, Syracuse, New York	New York Air National Guard	ACC	MQ-9 Reaper
175th Wing	(WG)	(IPCW)		Warfield ANGB, Middle River, Maryland	Maryland Air National Guard	ACC	Cyber
176th Wing	(WG)	(CGW)		JB Elmendorf–Richardson, Anchorage, Alaska	Alaska Air National Guard	PACAF	HH-60W Jolly Green II, HC-130J Combat King II, C-17 Globemaster III.
177th Fighter Wing	(FW)	(CGW)		Atlantic City ANGB, Atlantic City, New Jersey	New Jersey Air National Guard	ACC	F-16 Fighting Falcon
178th Wing	(WG)	(IPCW)		Springfield-Beckley Municipal Airport, Ohio	Ohio Air National Guard	ACC	MQ-9 Reaper
179th Cyberspace Wing	(CW)	(IPCW)		Mansfield Lahm ANGB, Mansfield, Ohio	Ohio Air National Guard	ACC	Information operations and engineering infrastructure
180th Fighter Wing	(FW)	(CGW)		Toledo ANGB, Toledo, Ohio	Ohio Air National Guard	ACC	F-16 Fighting Falcon
181st Intelligence Wing	(IW)	(IPCW)		Terre Haute International Airport, Indiana	Indiana Air National Guard	ACC	Intelligence
182nd Airlift Wing	(AW)	(CGW)		Peoria ANGB, Peoria, Illinois	Illinois Air National Guard	AMC	C-130 Hercules
183rd Wing	(WG)	(IPCW)		Capital Municipal Airport, Illinois	Illinois Air National Guard	ACC	Air staff augmentees
184th Wing	(WG)	(IPCW)		McConnell Air Force Base, Kansas	Kansas Air National Guard	ACC	Intelligence and cyber
185th Air Refueling Wing	(ARW)	(CGW)		Sioux City ANGB (Colonel Bud Day Field), Sioux City, Iowa	Iowa Air National Guard	AMC	KC-135 Stratotanker
186th Air Refueling Wing	(ARW)	(CGW)		Key Field ANGB, Meridian, Mississippi	Mississippi Air National Guard	AMC	KC-135 Stratotanker
187th Fighter Wing	(FW)	(CGW)		Montgomery ANGB (Dannelly Field), Montgomery, Alabama	Alabama Air National Guard	ACC	F-35 Lightning II
188th Wing	(WG)	(IPCW)		Ebbing ANGB, Fort Smith, Arkansas	Arkansas Air National Guard	ACC	MQ-9 Reaper
189th Airlift Wing	(AW)	(IPCW)		Little Rock AFB, Arkansas	Arkansas Air National Guard	AETC	C-130 Hercules Formal Training Unit (FTU)
190th Air Refueling Wing	(ARW)	(CGW)		Forbes Field ANGB, Topeka, Kansas	Kansas Air National Guard	AMC	KC-135 Stratotanker
192nd Wing	(WG)	(CGW)		JB Langley-Eustis, Virginia	Virginia Air National Guard	ACC	Associate to 1st FW
193rd Special Operations Wing	(SOW)	(CGW)		Harrisburg ANGB, Middletown, Pennsylvania	Pennsylvania Air National Guard	AFSOC	MC-130J Commando II
194th Wing	(WG)	(CGW)		Camp Murray, Washington	Washington Air National Guard	ACC	Air Support Operations Squadrons (ASOS), cyber and intelligence
195th Wing	(WG)	(IPCW)		Beale Air Force Base, California	California Air National Guard	ACC	Cyber, Combat Communications and ISR

Return to List of wings of the United States Air Force
