= 169th Airlift Squadron =

169th Airlift Squadron

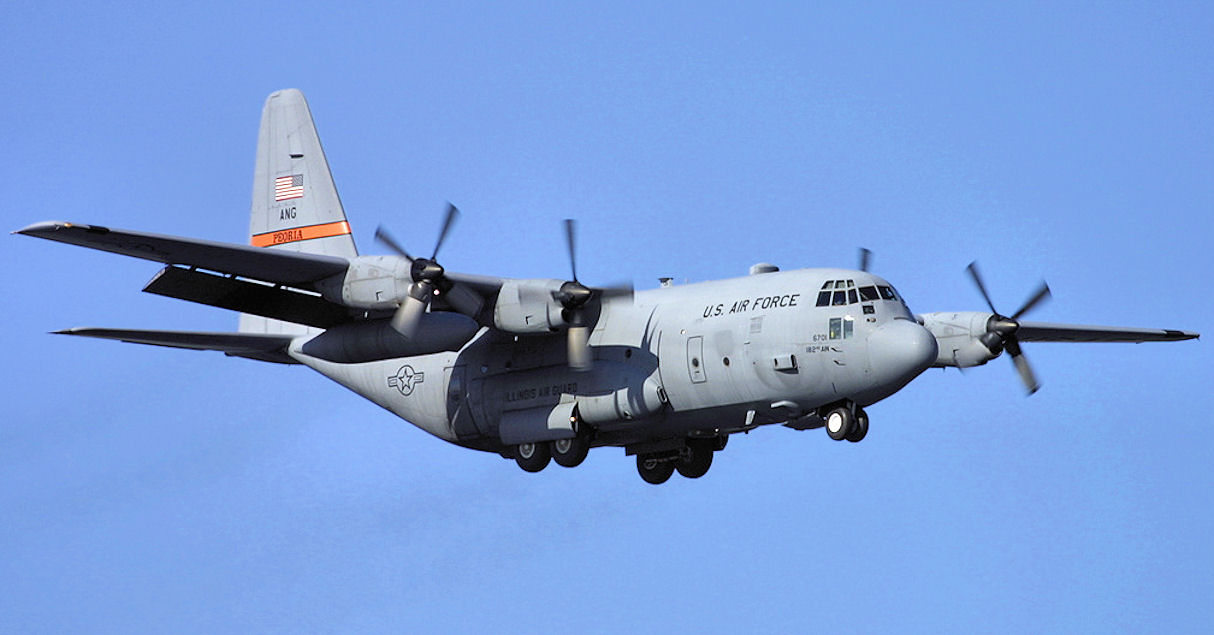
- 169th Airlift Squadron Lockheed C-130H3 Hercules 94-6701
- Active: 1942–1944; 1947–1969; 1969–present
- Country: United States
- Branch: Air National Guard
- Type: Squadron
- Role: Airlift
- Part of: Illinois Air National Guard
- Garrison/HQ: Peoria Air National Guard Base, Illinois
- Nickname: Defenders of Freedom
- Decorations: Air Force Outstanding Unit Award

Insignia
- 169th Airlift Squadron emblem

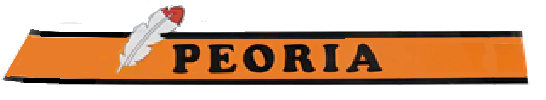
- Tail stripe

The 169th Airlift Squadron is a unit of the Illinois Air National Guard 182d Airlift Wing located at Peoria Air National Guard Base, Peoria, Illinois. The 169th is equipped with a C-130H3 Hercules.

== History ==
=== World War II ===
The 304th Fighter Squadron was activated at Morris Field, North Carolina with the 98th, and 303d Fighter Squadrons, (Note: This squadron is not related to the current reserve 303d Fighter Squadron, which was a troop carrier unit during World War II.) as part of the 337th Fighter Group. It received its initial cadre from the 20th Fighter Group. The squadron operated as replacement training unit, flying primarily P-40 Warhawks and P-51 Mustangs, as well as other fighter aircraft. The squadron was disbanded in 1944 as part of a major reorganization of the Army Air Forces in which all units not programmed to be transferred overseas were replaced by AAF Base Units to free up manpower for overseas deployment. The Section C of the 341st AAF Base Unit (Replacement Training Unit, Fighter) took over the squadron's equipment at Pinellas.

=== Illinois Air National Guard ===
The 304th Fighter Squadron was reconstituted and redesignated the 169th Fighter Squadron on 24 May 1946. It was allotted to the National Guard, being organized at Greater Peoria Airport, Illinois and was extended federal recognition on 21 June 1947. The 169th Fighter Squadron was assigned to the 126th Bombardment Group (Light), at Chicago Municipal Airport.

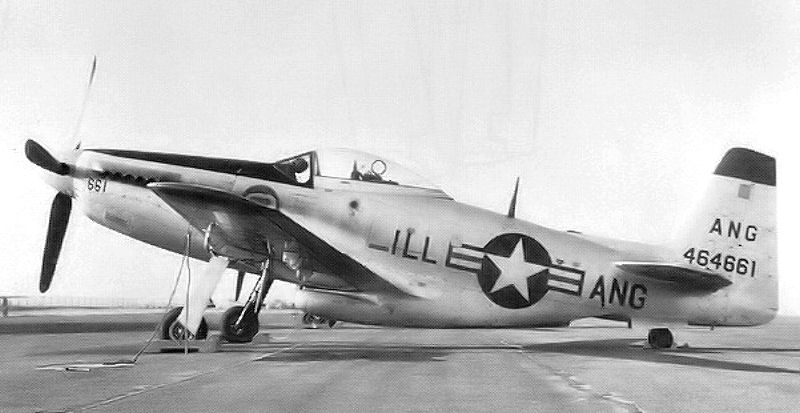
169th Fighter Squadron – North American F-51H-10-NA Mustang 44-64661

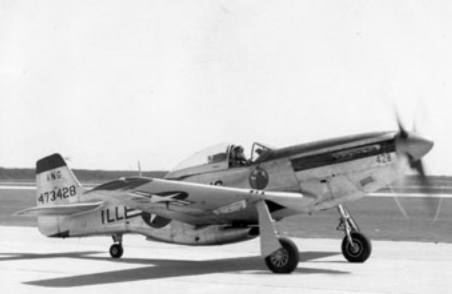
F-51D-25-NA Mustang (s/n 44-73428) from the 169th Fighter Squadron

==== Cold War ====
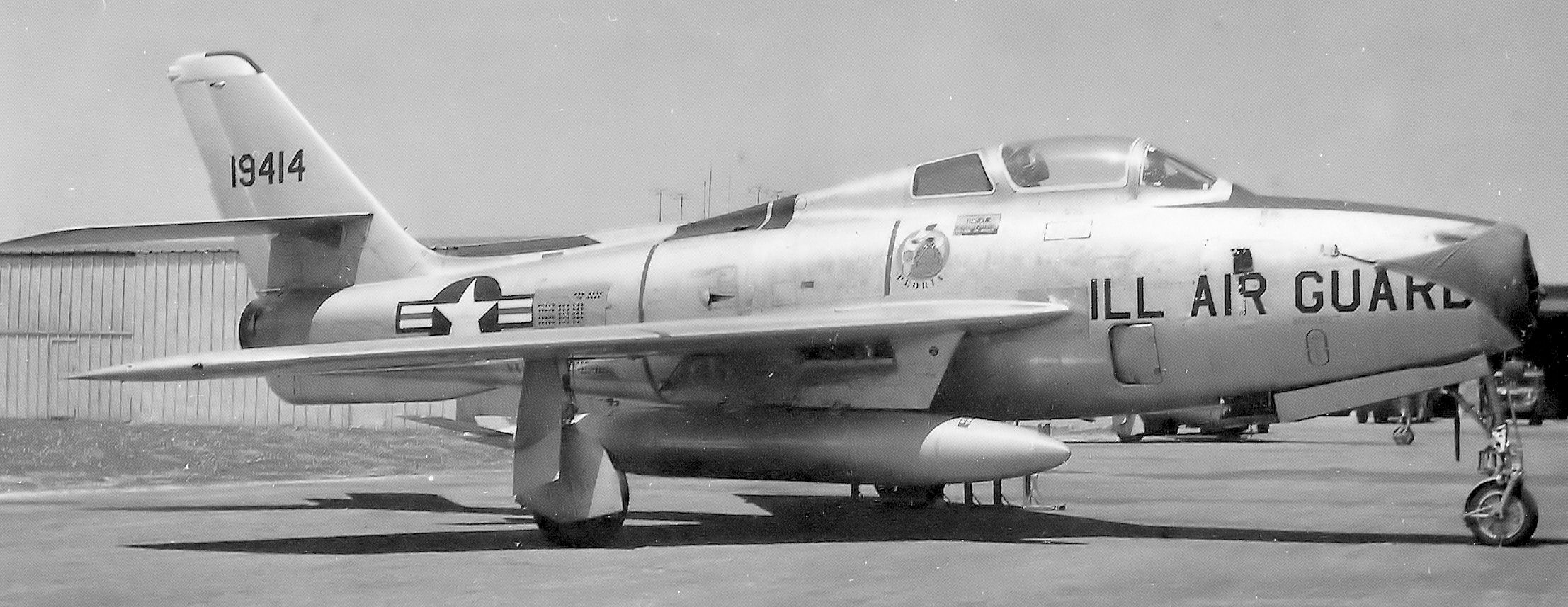
169th TFS F-84F 51-9414

The 169th received the long-range F-51H which was designed as an escort fighter for B-29s in the Pacific Theater during World War II. In 1954 the 169th obtained the copyright for The Chief, a Walt Disney cartoon character, to display as their emblem. The obsolete Mustangs were retired in 1956 and for two years, the squadron flew T-6G Texan trainers. In 1958, the squadron received its first F-84F Thunderstreak, and began a tactical fighter mission in the late 1950s.

On 1 July 1961, the parent 125th Wing's mission was changed to an air refueling one and the squadron was assigned the KC-97 Stratofreighter aircraft. The 169th flew the first Air National Guard air-to-air refueling mission in 1961.

On 1 October 1961, as a result of the 1961 Berlin Crisis, the 169th was again mobilized and assigned to the Missouri ANG 131st Tactical Fighter Wing, and again equipped with F-84F Thunderstreak tactical fighters. Due to budget shortfalls, the squadron physically remained at Peoria while the 131st Wing and its 110th Tactical Fighter Squadron deployed to Toul-Rosières Air Base, France as the USAFE 7131st Tactical Fighter Wing. During the next year, elements of the 169th were rotated from Peoria to Toul as needed.

While in France, the Guardsmen assumed regular commitments on a training basis with the U.S. 7th Army as well as maintaining a 24-hour alert status. The 7131st exchanged both air and ground crews with the Royal Danish Air Force's 730th Tactical Fighter Squadron at Skydstrup Air Station, Denmark, during May 1962. As the Berlin situation subsided, all activated ANG units were ordered to be returned to the United States and released from active duty. The 7131st TFW was inactivated in place in France on 19 July 1962 leaving its aircraft and equipment to USAFE.

Upon its return to Illinois State Control, the Illinois Air National Guard authorized the 169th Tactical Fighter Squadron to expand to a group level, and the 182d Tactical Fighter Group was established by the National Guard Bureau on 15 October 1962. The 169th became the group's flying squadron. Other elements assigned into the group were the 182d headquarters, 182d Material Squadron (maintenance and supply), 182d Combat Support Squadron, and the 182d Tactical Dispensary.

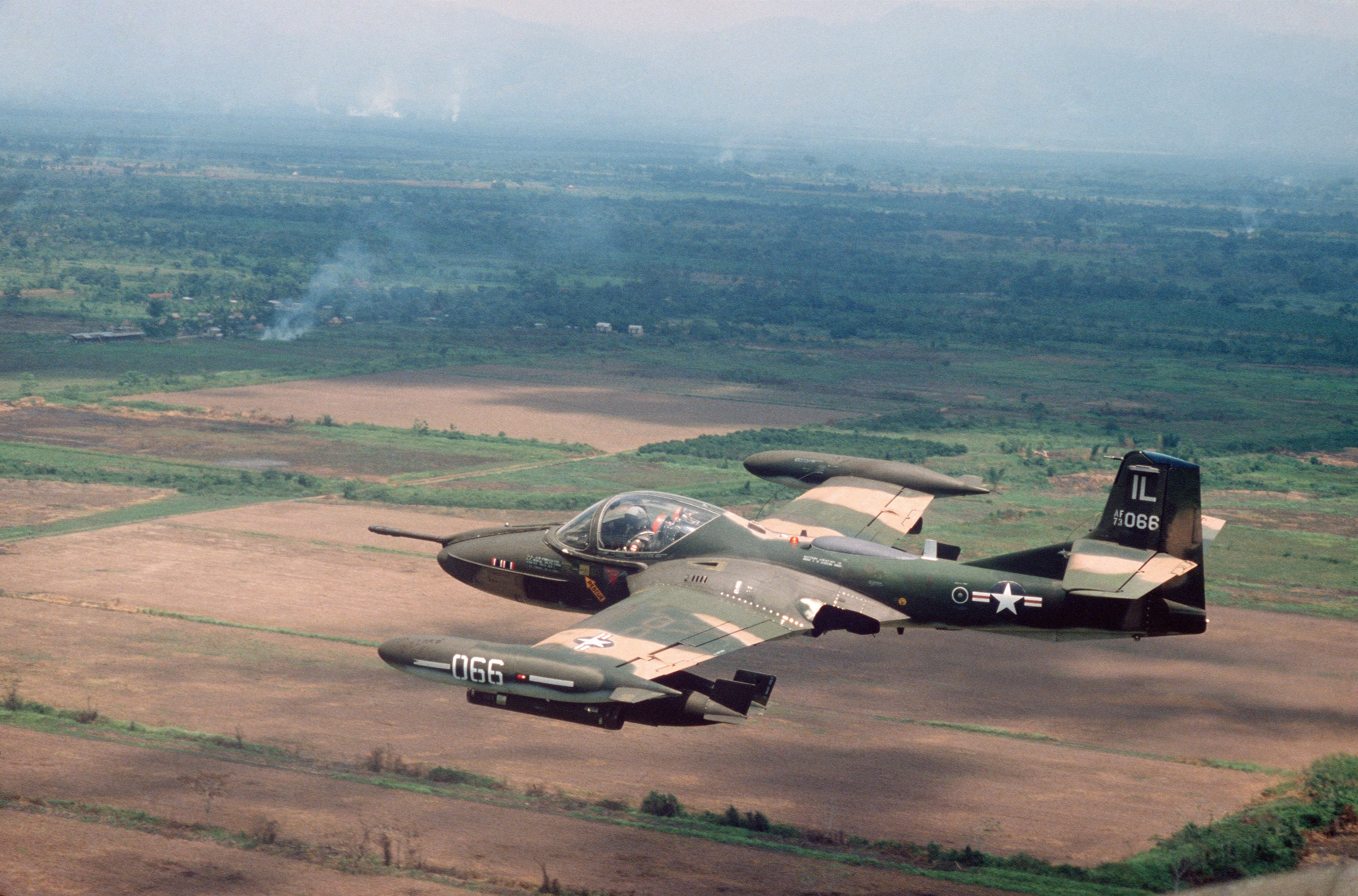
OA-37B Dragonfly aircraft from the 169th Tactical Air Support Squadron, 1984

During the 1960s the squadron continued to operate its F-84F Thunderstreaks, and the unit was not activated during the Vietnam War. In May 1969, the F-84Fs were retired and 182d TFG was re-designated as the 182d Tactical Air Support Group (TASG), flying Forward Air Control (FAC) missions. The 169th was equipped with light observation U-3A/B Blue Canoe and in January 1970, the O-2A Skymaster aircraft. The group's mission being to perform visual reconnaissance, as FAC aircraft flew at low altitude over rough terrain to maintain constant aerial surveillance of combat areas. By patrolling the same area constantly, the FACs grew very familiar with the terrain, and they learned to detect any changes that could indicate enemy forces hiding below. Members of the 182d TASG provided disaster relief during state active duty following the Canton tornado in July 1975. In 1976, the 182d TASG was awarded its first Air Force Outstanding Unit Award.

In 1979, the squadron received OA-37B Dragonfly jet FAC aircraft from the New York and Maine Air National Guard, continuing the FAC mission. The 182d TASG received an "Excellent" rating on its first Operational Readiness Inspection (ORI) under the 12th Air Force, and the group was awarded its second Air Force Outstanding Unit award in 1985. In January 1991, 138 group personnel were called to active duty during the 1991 Gulf War and deployed to United States Central Command Air Forces (CENTAF).

==== Post Cold War era ====
In March 1992 the A-37s were finally retired. and the group received the Block 15 F-16A/B Fighting Falcon Air Defense Fighter (ADF). It was re-designated as the 182d Fighter Group on 15 March. In June 1993, members served on state active duty in response to the Mississippi River flooding of southern Illinois.

Due to government budget constraints and military restructuring after the Cold War, the 169th converted to the C-130E Hercules and was re-designated the 182d Airlift Wing (AW) effective 1 October 1995. In 1996, the wing began participation in ongoing flying missions for Operation Joint Endeavor in Bosnia. In 1997, the 182d AW celebrated its 50th anniversary and received an "Excellent" in its first Air Mobility Command (AMC) ORI.

169th AS C-130 landing at Grayling Army Airfield during Exercise Northern Strike 2013

==== Global War on Terrorism ====
After the September 11 attacks, members of the wing were called up to support the Air Force at various locations around the world. During a September 2002 deployment to Oman, wing aircraft flew combat supply missions into Afghanistan for Operation Enduring Freedom. On 29 March 2003, SSgt Jacob Frazier of the 169th Air Support Operations Squadron was killed in action while serving with Army Special Forces in Afghanistan. He was the first member of the wing to die in combat.

In March 2003, immediately following mobilization, six aircraft and over 350 personnel were deployed to Minhad, United Arab Emirates, for Operation Iraqi Freedom. These airmen returned in August after providing airlift support throughout the theater. Since that mobilization, smaller numbers of wing personnel and aircraft have continually supported Operations Enduring Freedom and Iraqi Freedom. On 28 December 2003, a wing crew delivered earthquake relief supplies to Iran, becoming the first US aircraft to land there since 1981.

Beginning in January 2005, the wing converted from the C-130E to the newer H3 model. In October 2006, the squadron received a rating of "Excellent" after serving as the lead wing during an Air Mobility Command Operational Readiness Inspection(AMC ORI). On 3 February 2007, the squadron was awarded its third Air Force Outstanding Unit Award for the period from 1 August 2003 to 31 July 2005. Some personnel remain deployed to combat zones as part of Air and Space Expeditionary units while other members of the wing continue routine worldwide support to the Air Force

=== Lineage ===
169th Tactical Fighter Squadron

- Constituted as the 304th Fighter Squadron on 16 July 1942

Activated on 23 July 1942
Disbanded on 1 May 1944
Reconstituted, redesignated 169th Fighter Squadron, and allotted to the National Guard on 24 May 1946
Activated on 7 December 1946
Extended federal recognition on 21 June 1947
Ordered to active service on 1 April 1951
Redesignated 169th Fighter-Interceptor Squadron on 2 July 1952
Redesignated 169th Fighter-Bomber Squadron on 1 December 1952
Inactivated, relieved from active duty and returned to Illinois state control on 1 January 1953
Redesignated 169th Fighter-Interceptor Squadron on 22 June 1955
Redesignated 169th Fighter-Interceptor Squadron, Day (Special Delivery) on 22 June 1955
Redesignated 169th Tactical Fighter Squadron (Special Delivery) on 10 November 1958
Ordered to active service on 1 October 1961
Redesignated 169th Tactical Fighter Squadron on 1 October 1961
Relieved from active duty and returned to Illinois state control on 31 August 1962
Redesignated 169th Tactical Fighter Squadron on 15 October 1958
Inactivated on 15 May 1969

- Consolidated with the 169th Tactical Air Support Squadron on 18 August 1987

169th Airlift Squadron

- Constituted as the 169th Tactical Air Support Squadron on 1 May 1969

Activated on 16 May 1969

- Consolidated with the 169th Tactical Fighter Squadron on 18 August 1987

Redesignated 169th Fighter Squadron on 16 July 1992
Redesignated 169th Airlift Squadron on 1 April 1995

=== Assignments ===
- 337th Fighter Group, 23 July 1942 – 1 May 1944
- 66th Fighter Wing, 21 June 1947
- 127th Fighter Group, 29 June 1947
- 131st Fighter Group, June 1949
- 126th Composite Grouop, 1 November 1950
- Illinois Air National Guard, in Feb 1951
- 126th Fighter-Bomber Group (later 126th Fighter-Interceptor Group), 1 December 1952
- 126th Air Defense Wing, 1 July 1955
- 126th Air Refueling Wing, 10 March 1958
- 131st Tactical Fighter Wing, 10 November 1958
- 131st Tactical Fighter Group, 1 October 1961
- 182d Tactical Fighter Group (later 182d Tactical Air Support Group, 182d Fighter Group), 15 October 1962
- 182d Operations Group, 1 Oct 1995–present.

=== Stations ===
- Morris Field, North Carolina, 23 July 1942
- Myrtle Beach Bombing Range, South Carolina, 23 July 1942
- Pinellas Army Airfield, Florida, 30 August 1942 – 1 May 1944
- Greater Peoria Airport (later Peoria Air National Guard Base), Illinois, 21 June 1947 – present (elements operated from Toul-Rosieres Air Base, France, 1 October 1961 – 31 August 1962)

=== Aircraft ===
- P-39 Airacobra, 1942
- P-43 Lancer, 1942
- P-40 Warhawk, 1942–1944
- F-51D Mustang, 1947–1951, 1954–1956
- F-51H Mustang, 1951–1954
- T-28A Trojan, 1956–1958
- F-84F Thunderstreak, 1958–1969
- KC-97 Stratofreighter, 1961
- U-3A/B Blue Canoe, 1969–1970
- O-2A Skymaster, 1970–1979
- OA-37B Dragonfly, 1979–1992
- F-16A/B Fighting Falcon, 1992–1995
- C-130E Hercules, 1995–2007
- C-130H3 Hercules, 2007–present
