= 66th Fighter Wing =

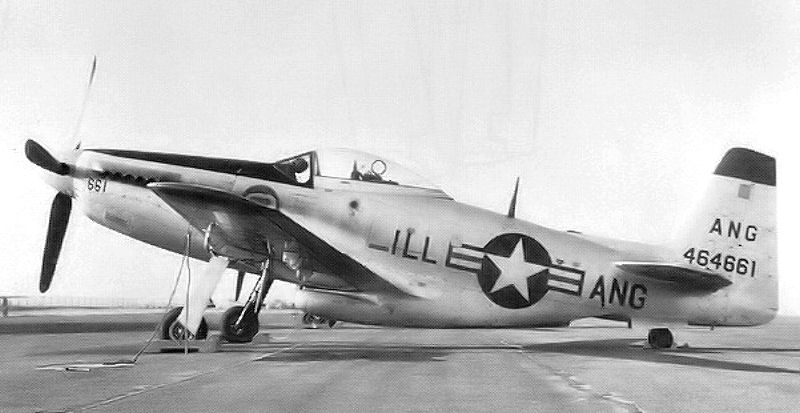
- Illinois Air National Guard 169th Fighter Squadron F-51H Mustang 44-64661
- Active: 1943–1945; 1946–1950
- Country: United States
- Branch: United States Air Force
- Role: Fighter
- Part of: Illinois Air National Guard

The 66th Fighter Wing is a disbanded unit of the United States Air Force, last stationed at Chicago Municipal Airport, Illinois. It was withdrawn from the Illinois Air National Guard and inactivated on 31 October 1950.

== History ==
=== World War II ===
Established in March 1943 at Norfolk Army Airfield Virginia. Supervised training of fighter units for overseas duty.

Reorganized and deployed to England, became an intermediate-level command and control organization for VIII Fighter Command with responsibility for fighter-escort groups of Eighth Air Force. Assigned groups provided fighter escort to B-17 Flying Fortress and B-24 Liberator heavy bomber groups during combat missions over Occupied Europe July 1943 – May 1945. Inactivated in England, 21 November 1945.

=== Air National Guard ===
Allotted to the Illinois Air National Guard to control ANG fighters and bombers in the Upper Midwest region of the United States. Extended federal recognition and activated on 26 November 1946.

At the end of October 1950, the Air National Guard converted to the wing-base Hobson Plan organization. As a result, the wing was withdrawn from the Illinois ANG and was inactivated on 31 October 1950. The 126th Composite Wing was established by the National Guard Bureau, allocated to the state of Illinois, recognized and activated 1 November 1950; assuming the personnel, equipment and mission of the inactivated 66th Fighter Wing.

=== Lineage ===
- Constituted as the 5th Air Defense Wing on 25 March 1943

Activated on 27 March 1943
Re-designated 66th Fighter Wing on 3 July 1943.
Inactivated on 21 November 1945.

- Allotted to the National Guard on 24 May 1946

Extended federal recognition and activated on 26 November 1946
Inactivated, and returned to the control of the Department of the Air Force, on 31 October 1950

- Disbanded on 15 June 1983

=== Assignments ===
- Eighth Air Force, 27 March 1943
- VIII Fighter Command, 3 July 1943 – 21 November 1945
- Illinois Air National Guard, 26 November 1946 – 31 October 1950

=== Components ===
==== World War II ====
- 4th Fighter Group: 23 July – 4 November 1945
- 55th Fighter Group: 14 September 1943 – 23 July 1945
- 56th Fighter Group: 15 September – 11 October 1945
- 78th Fighter Group: April 1943 – October 1945
- 339th Fighter Group: 4 April 1944 – October 1945
- 353d Fighter Group: 3 August 1943 – October 1945
- 357th Fighter Group, 31 January 1944 – 8 July 1945
- 358th Fighter Group, 20 October 1943 – 3 July 1944
- 359th Fighter Group: October 1943 – November 1945
- 361st Fighter Group: 30 November 1943 – 1 February 1945; April 1945
- 479th Fighter Group: 15 May 1944 – 21 November 1945

==== Illinois Air National Guard ====
- 126th Bombardment Group, 29 June 1947 – 31 October 1950
- 169th Fighter Squadron, 21–29 June 1947
- 122d Fighter Group, 9 December 1946 – 7 December 1947 (Indiana ANG)
- 127th Fighter Group, 29 September 1946 – 31 October 1950 (Michigan ANG)
- 128th Fighter Group, 29 June 1948 – 31 October 1950 (Wisconsin ANG)
- 112th Bombardment Squadron, 2 December 1946 – 7 December 1947 (Ohio ANG)
- 162d Fighter Squadron, 22 November-7 December 1947 (Ohio ANG)
- 166th Fighter Squadron, 10 November-7 December 1947 (Ohio ANG)

=== Stations ===
- Norfolk Airport, Virginia, 27 March-c. 11 May 1943
- RAF Duxford (AAF-357), England, c. 3 June 1943
- Sawston Hall (AAF-371), England, 20 August 1943
- RAF Troston (AAF-595), England, C. 25 October – 21 November 1945
- Chicago Municipal Airport, Illinois, 26 November 1946 – 31 October 1950
