= Jewsbury =

Jewsbury is a surname. Notable people with the surname include:

- Anna Jewsbury (born 1986), English designer
- Geraldine Jewsbury (1812–1880), English novelist
- George Jewsbury (born 1941), American historian
- Jack Jewsbury (born 1981), American soccer player
- Maria Jane Jewsbury (1800–1833), English novelist

== See also ==
- Dewsbury (disambiguation)
