= KPIA =

KPIA may refer to:

- KPIA-LP, a low-power radio station (102.5 FM) licensed to Huntsville, Texas, United States
- the ICAO code for General Wayne Downing Peoria International Airport
