= Cessna O-2 Skymaster =

American observation aircraft

O-2 Skymaster
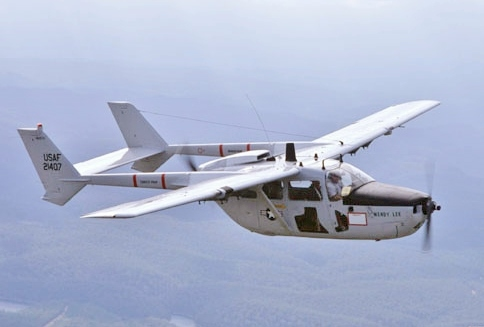
- O-2A Skymaster

General information
- Type: Observation aircraft
- National origin: United States
- Manufacturer: Cessna
- Status: Limited service
- Primary users: United States Air Force (historical) Botswana Air Force; Salvadoran Air Force
- Number built: 532

History
- Manufactured: March 1967 - June 1970
- Introduction date: March 1967
- First flight: January 1967
- Retired: 2010 (United States)
- Developed from: Cessna Skymaster

The Cessna O-2 Skymaster (nicknamed "Oscar Deuce") is a military version of the Cessna 337 Super Skymaster, used for forward air control and psychological operations by the US military between 1967 and 2010.

== Design and development ==
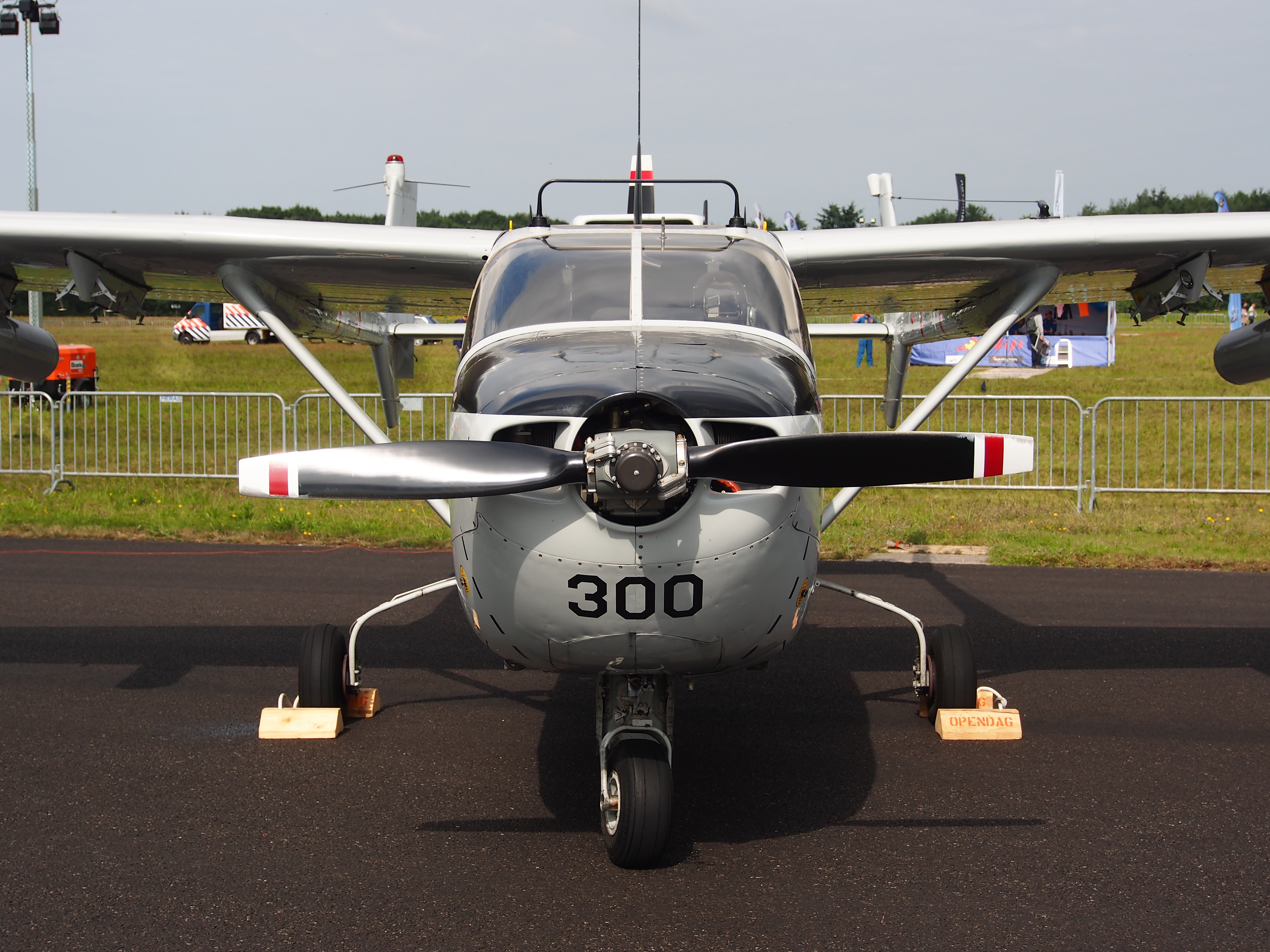
The O-2 lacks the 337 propeller spinner.

In 1966, the United States Air Force (USAF) commissioned Cessna to build a military variant of the Model 337 Skymaster to supplement the Cessna O-1 Bird Dog in the role of forward air control.

Both the civilian and military Skymasters were low-cost, twin piston-engined aircraft, with one engine in the nose of the aircraft and a second in the rear of the fuselage. The push-pull configuration provided centerline thrust, allowing simpler operation than the low-wing mounting of most twin-engined light aircraft and allowed a high wing to be used, providing clear observation below and behind the aircraft.

Modifications made for the military configuration included fore-and-aft seating for a pilot and observer, instead of the six seats of the civilian version; installation of view panels in the doors (for improved ground observation); installation of flame-retardant foam in the wing-mounted fuel tanks (slightly increasing weight and reducing maximum fuel capacity by 3%); installation of military, rather than civilian, communication and navigation equipment and antennas; removal of propeller spinners; increased gross weight (5,400 vs. 4,400 lb in civilian version), with component strengthening as required to support the increase; and removal of interior upholstery.

The O-2 first flew in January 1967, and the plane went into production shortly thereafter in March. Performance (especially at cruising altitudes) was degraded due to the added antennae and significant weight increase, but was considered sufficient for the anticipated low-level operation.

== Operational history ==
=== United States ===
==== U.S. Air Force ====
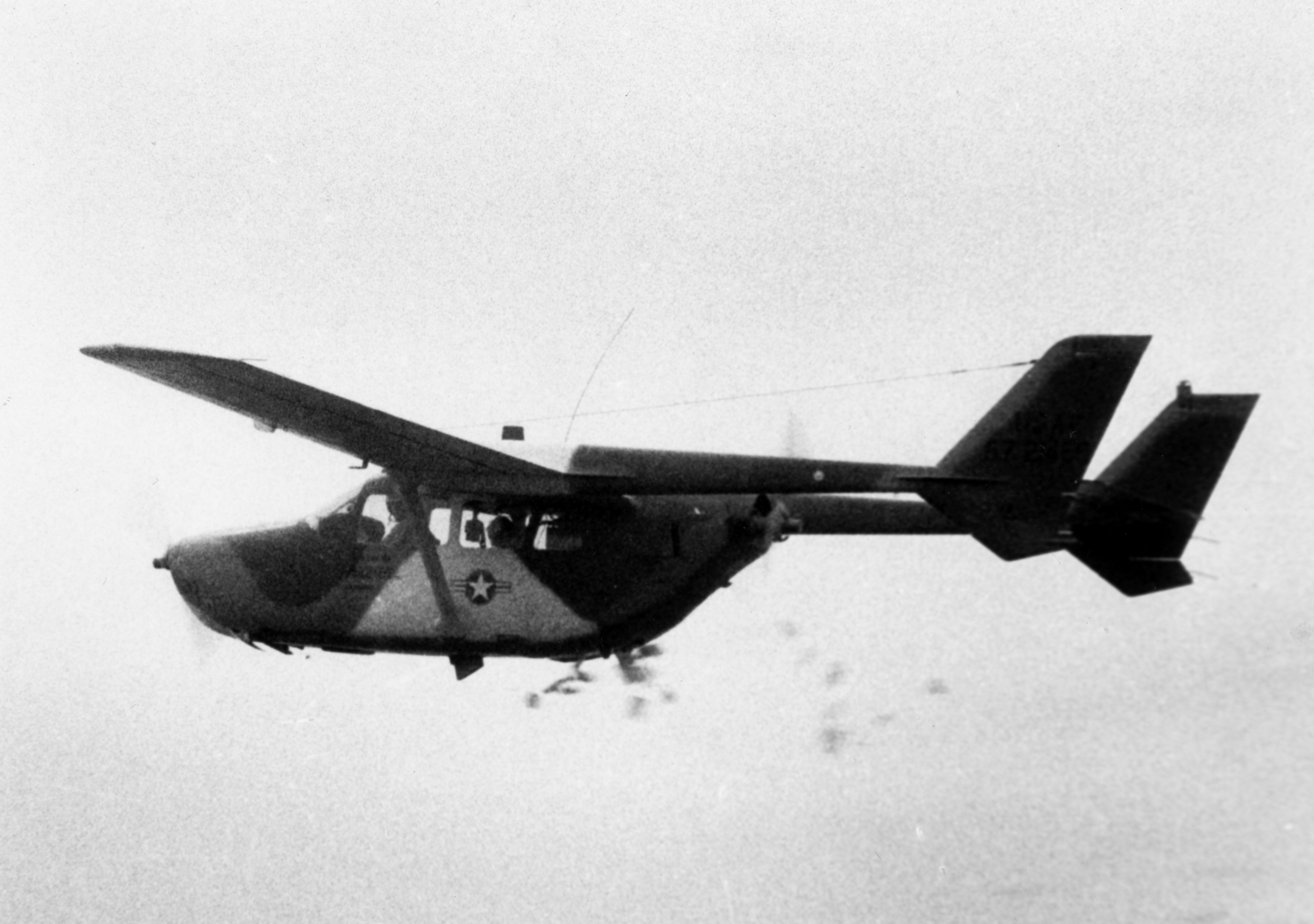
O-2B Skymaster dropping leaflets over Vietnam

The USAF took delivery of the O-2 Skymaster in March 1967, and the O-2A also entered the U.S. Army's inventory during 1967, from USAF stock. By June 1970, when production stopped, a total of 532 O-2s had been built for the USAF.

During the Vietnam War, the O-2A was introduced as a replacement for the O-1 Bird Dog, in the forward air control (FAC) aircraft and served in that role with the 20th Tactical Air Support Squadron. The O-2B was equipped with loudspeakers and a leaflet dispenser for use in the psychological operations role.

While the Skymaster was intended to be replaced in the FAC mission by the OV-10 Bronco, the O-2A continued to be used for night missions after the OV-10's introduction, due to the OV-10's high level of cockpit illumination, rendering night reconnaissance impractical. The O-2 was phased out completely after additional night upgrades to the OV-10.

In total, 178 USAF O-2 Skymasters were lost in the Vietnam War to all causes.

Following the Vietnam War, the O-2 continued to operate with both U.S. Air Force (USAF) and Air National Guard units into the late 1980s.

==== U.S. Navy ====
Six former USAF O-2A airframes were transferred to the U.S. Navy (USN) in 1983 for use as range controllers with Attack Squadron 122, the Pacific Fleet Replacement Squadron for the A-7 Corsair II at Naval Air Station Lemoore, California. These aircraft were later transferred to Strike Fighter Squadron 125, the F/A-18 Hornet FRS at NAS Lemoore, in 1986 for use in the same range control role. These O-2A aircraft were eventually replaced by T-34C Turbo-Mentor aircraft transferred from the Naval Air Training Command.

==== U.S. Army ====
Of the six USN aircraft mentioned above, two were transferred to the U.S. Army in late 1990. USAF O-2As were augmented by the 1990 aircraft transfer from the USN. Several disassembled USAF O-2s remain in storage at Davis-Monthan AFB, Arizona. Two O-2As were used at Laguna Army Airfield, Arizona, as part of testing programs carried out by the Yuma Proving Ground. These were retired in October 2010 and sent to a museum.

=== South Vietnam ===
Thirty-five USAF O-2 aircraft were later transferred to and operated by the Republic of Vietnam Air Force.

=== El Salvador ===
During the Salvadoran Civil War, the Salvadoran Air Force received a total of 23 O-2As and two O-2Bs from the United States, the first arriving in 1981. They were employed to observe the movements of FMLN formations and direct air strikes against them, playing a major role in forcing the rebel movement to abandon large-scale operations.

Near the end of the war in 1990, the rebels' acquisition of SA-7 missiles resulted in the loss of two O-2As, while another was destroyed by mortar fire, and two more were lost in crashes.

=== Civilian use ===
==== CAL FIRE ====
In the mid-1970s, the California Department of Forestry and Fire Protection, or CAL FIRE, found that the contractor-owned air attack aircraft, mostly single-engined Cessna 182s and Cessna 210s, did not provide the airspeed and safety needed for the department's new air tanker program. In 1974, Senior Air Operations Officer Cotton Mason inspected 40 USAF O-2s at Davis-Monthan Air Force Base. The best 20 were selected and shipped to Fresno, California. These aircraft had been FAC aircraft in Vietnam and shipped back to the United States in containers; they were disassembled and on pallets when they arrived at Fresno. A crew of California Conservation Corps members under the supervision of a CDF battalion chief, who was an FAA Certified Mechanic with Inspection Authorization, reassembled the aircraft.

They were placed in service in 1976, and served CAL FIRE for more than 20 years, until replaced by a fleet of OV-10 Broncos.

== Variants ==
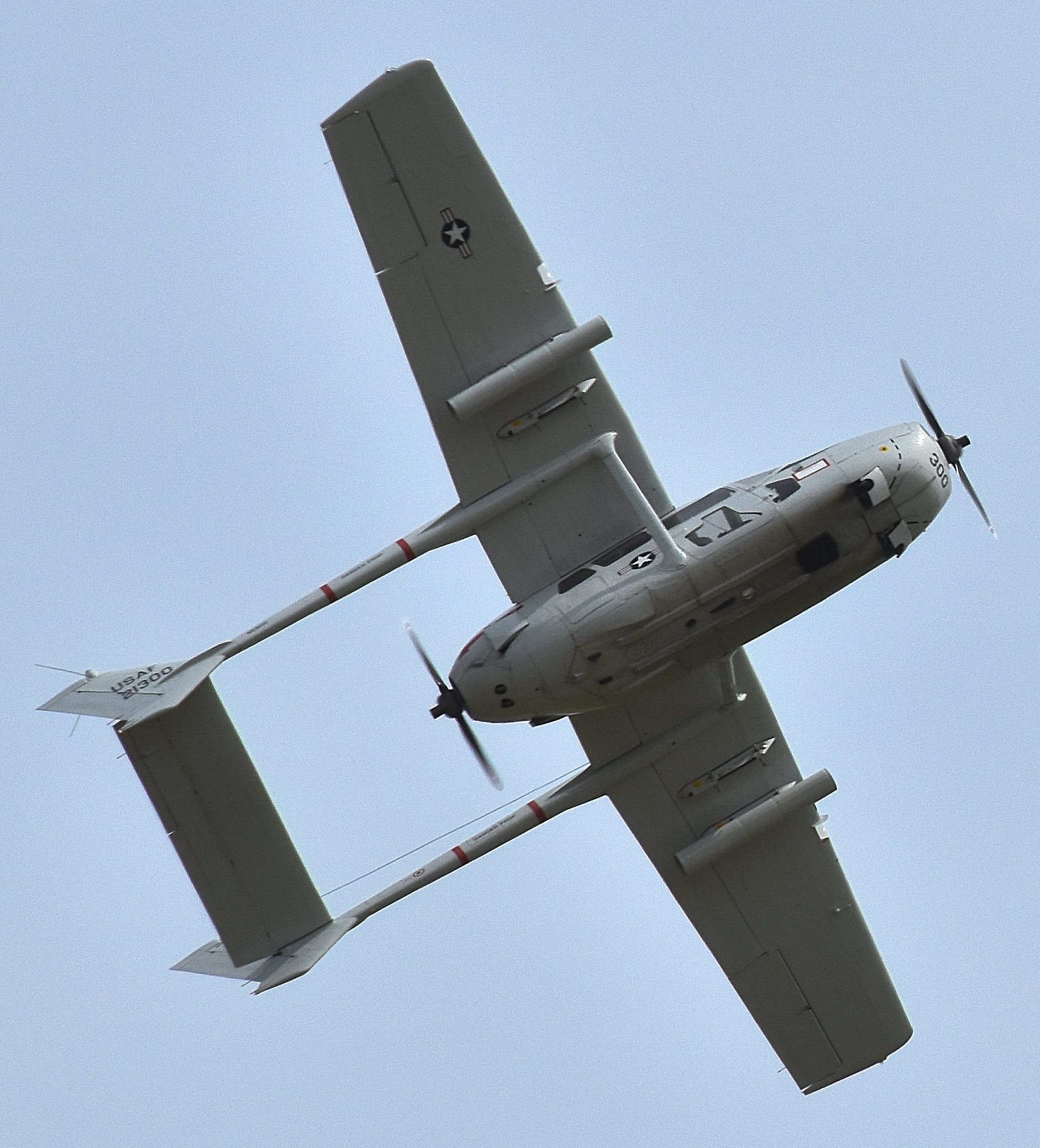
Planform view showing attachment points

O-2A
Version designed for use in forward air control missions, with underwing ordnance hard points to hold rockets, gun pods, or flares, 513 delivered
O-2B
Designed for psychological warfare, this version was equipped with loudspeakers and a leaflet dispenser, and not armed; 31 former civilian 337s were converted to O-2Bs.

== Operators ==
Botswana

- Botswana Air Force – Nine O-2As were delivered in 1993.

Costa Rica

- Civil Guard Air Section – Three O-2As

Dominican Republic

- Dominican Air Force – Five O-2As (retired)

Ivory Coast

- National Armed Forces of Côte d'Ivoire – One O-2A delivered in 1993

Haiti

- Haitian Air Force – Eight (in service 1975–98), six of these reportedly were Model 337s, and only two were O-2As.

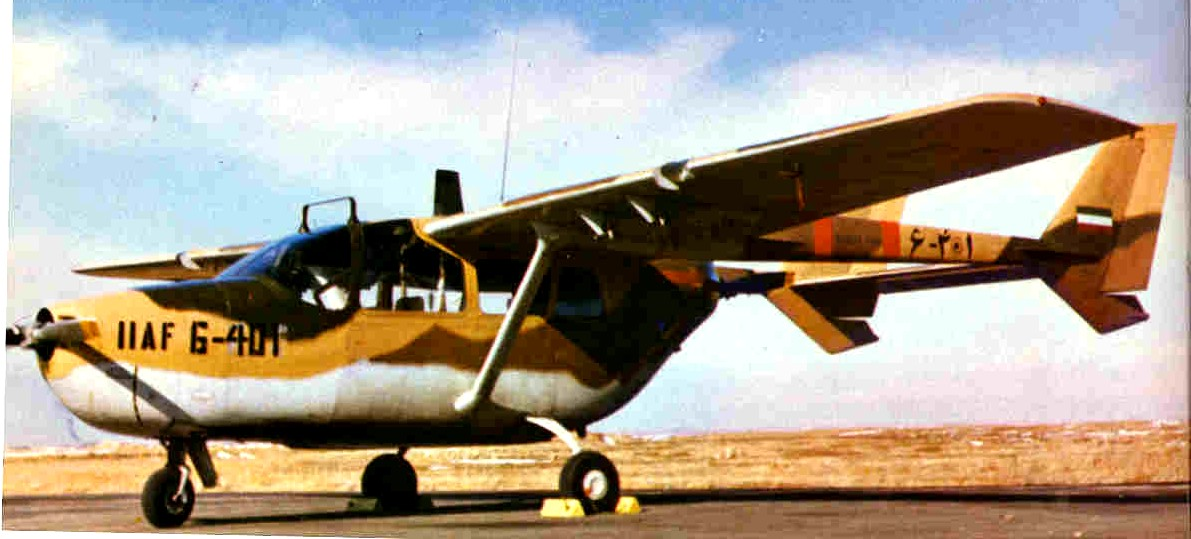
An O-2A of the Imperial Iranian Air Force

Iran

- Imperial Iranian Air Force – 12 O-2As were delivered in 1972.

Namibia

- Namibian Air Force – Six O-2As, five of which were delivered on June 26, 1994, for use in the antipoaching and antismuggling roles.

Nicaragua

- Fuerza Aérea de Nicaragua FAN GN

- 6 O-2As retired in 1979

El Salvador

- Salvadoran Air Force – 18 O-2As and two O-2Bs, delivered starting in 1981 Eight O-2A and one O-2B remain in service.

Solomon Islands

- Solomon Islands Government – Two O-2As

South Korea

- Republic of Korea Air Force – at least 14 O-2As

South Vietnam

- Republic of Vietnam Air Force – at least 35

Thailand

- Royal Thai Navy – 11 x O2-337 Sentry

United States

- USAF – about 532
- USN
- U.S. Army

Uruguay

- National Navy of Uruguay – Three O-2As were acquired from Chile in June 2017.

Zimbabwe

- Zimbabwe Air Force – Two O-2As were delivered in 1994–1995.

== Aircraft on display ==
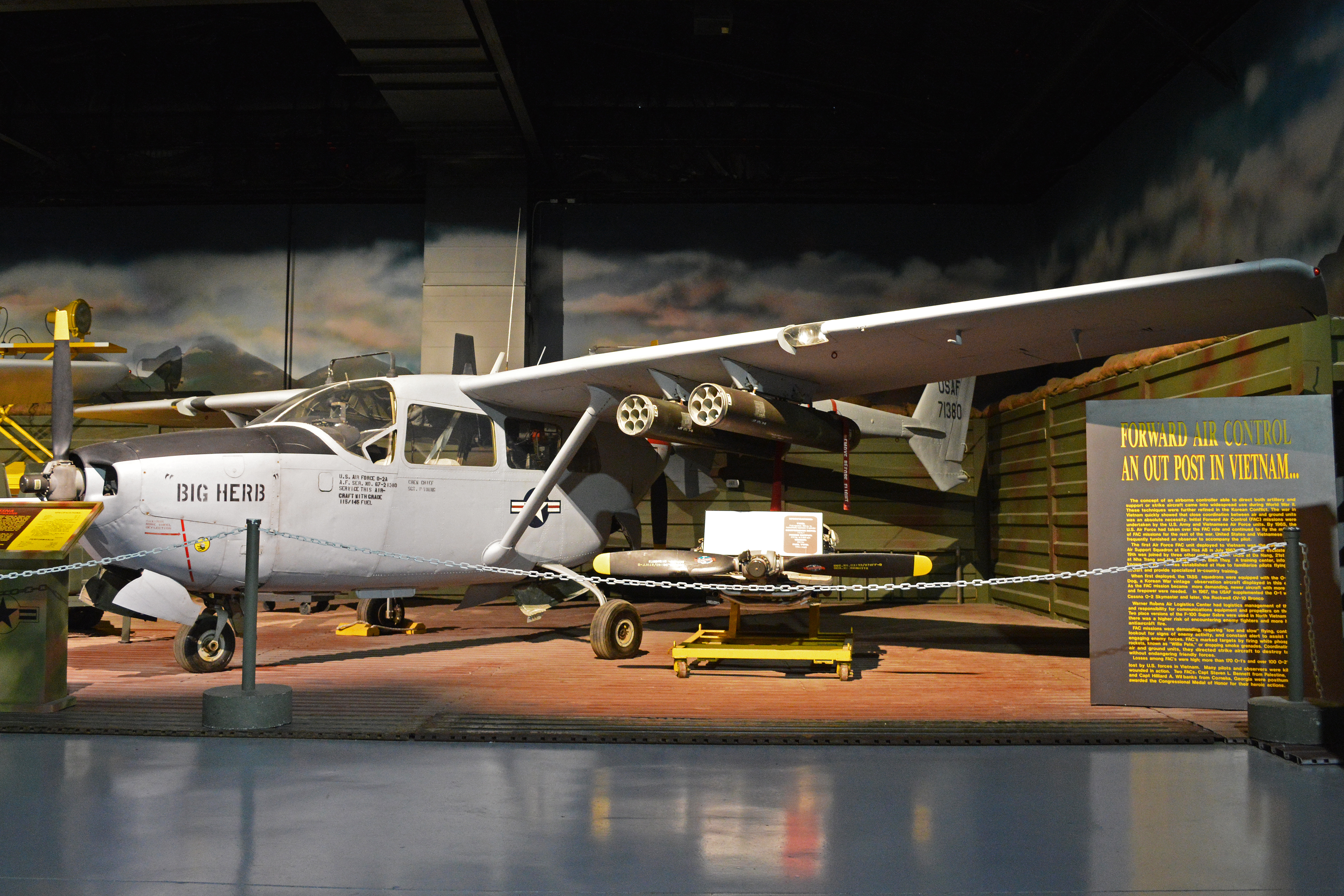
Displayed at the Museum of Aviation (Warner Robins)

- O-2A, AF Ser. No. 67-21331, National Museum of the United States Air Force, Wright-Patterson Air Force Base, Ohio; previously assigned to the 20th Tactical Air Support Squadron
- O-2A, AF Ser. No. 67-21368, Air Commando Park, Hurlburt Field, Florida
- O-2A, AF Ser. No. 67-21430, Fort Worth Aviation Museum, Fort Worth, Texas
- O-2A, AF Ser. No. 68-10962, Main Gate, Shaw Air Force Base, South Carolina
- O-2A, AF Ser. No. 67-21331, c/n 337M-0037, marked as 68-6864, c/n 337M-0153, Air Force Armament Museum, Eglin Air Force Base, Florida
- O-2A, AF Ser. No. 67-21376, 105th Airlift Wing area, Stewart Air National Guard Base, New York
- O-2A, AF Ser. No. 68-11164, USAF Airman Heritage Museum, Lackland Air Force Base, Texas
- O-2A, AF Ser. No. 68-6865, Kelly Field Heritage Museum, Lackland Air Force Base/Kelly Field Annex (formerly Kelly Air Force Base), Texas
- O-2A, AF Ser. No. 67-21318, Connecticut Air & Space Center, Sikorsky Memorial Airport, Connecticut
- O-2A, AF Ser. No. 67-21326, Dyess Linear Air Park, Dyess Air Force Base, Texas
- O-2A, AF Ser. No. 67-21395, Air Mobility Command Museum, Dover Air Force Base, Delaware
- O-2A, AF Ser. No. 68-10848, Jimmy Doolittle Air & Space Museum, Travis Air Force Base, Fairfield, California
- O-2A, AF Ser. No. 68-10853, Hill Aerospace Museum, Hill Air Force Base, Utah
- O-2A, AF Ser. No. 67-21380, Museum of Aviation, Robins Air Force Base, Georgia
- O-2A, AF Ser. No. 68-6871, Grissom Air Museum, Grissom Air Reserve Base (formerly Grissom Air Force Base), Indiana
- O-2A, AF Ser. No. 68-11160, 182nd Airlift Wing complex, Peoria Air National Guard Base, General Wayne A. Downing Peoria International Airport, Illinois
- O-2A, AF Ser. No. 68-6901, Pima Air and Space Museum (adjacent to Davis-Monthan Air Force Base), Tucson, Arizona
- O-2A, AF Ser. No. 67-21413, Castle Air Museum (former Castle Air Force Base), Atwater, California
- O-2A, AF Ser. No. 67-21411, in storage at Museum of Aviation, Robins Air Force Base, Warner Robins, Georgia, formerly on display at Octave Chanute Aerospace Museum, Rantoul, Illinois
- O-2A, AF Ser. No. 67-21330, Valiant Air Command Warbird Museum, Space Coast Regional Airport, Titusville, Florida
- O-2A, AF Ser. No. 67-21395, Evergreen Aviation Museum, McMinnville, Oregon
- O-2B, AF Ser. No. 67-21465, March Field Air Museum, March Air Reserve Base (formerly March Air Force Base), California
- O-2A, AF Ser. No. 69-7644, American Wings Air Museum, Anoka County Airport Jane's Field (KANE), Blaine, Minnesota
- O-2A, AF Ser. No. 67-21416, Yankee Air Museum, Belleville, Michigan
- In addition, several O-2s are privately operated as "warbirds".

== Specifications (O-2) ==
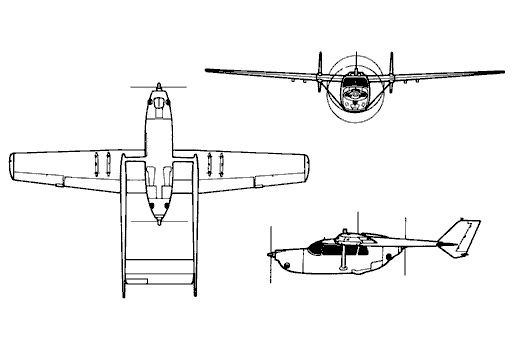
O-2 Line drawing

Data from

General characteristics

- Crew: 2
- Length: 29 ft 9 in (9.07 m)
- Wingspan: 38 ft 0 in (11.58 m)
- Height: 9 ft 4 in (2.84 m)
- Wing area: 202.5 sq ft (18.81 m^{2})
- Aspect ratio: 7.13:1
- Empty weight: 2,848 lb (1,292 kg)
- Max takeoff weight: 5,400 lb (2,449 kg)
- Powerplant: 2 × Continental IO-360C/D air-cooled flat-six engines, 210 hp (160 kW) each

Performance

- Maximum speed: 199 mph (320 km/h, 173 kn) at sea level
- Cruise speed: 144 mph (232 km/h, 125 kn) at 10,000 ft (3,000 m)
- Range: 1,060 mi (1,710 km, 920 nmi)
- Service ceiling: 19,800 ft (6,000 m)
- Rate of climb: 1,180 ft/min (6.0 m/s)

Armament

- Guns: SUU-11/A Minigun Pod
- Hardpoints: Four MAU-3A bomb racks
- Rockets: LAU-59/A Rocket Launcher, MA-2/A Rocket Launcher
- Bombs: SUU-14/A Bomblet Dispenser

== See also ==
Related development

- Cessna Skymaster
- AVE Mizar

Aircraft of comparable role, configuration, and era

- Adam A500
