= Duberry =

Family name

Duberry is a toponymic surname, from Dewsbury. Notable people with the surname include:

- Amario Cozier-Duberry (born 2005), English professional footballer
- André Duberry, (born 1982), Canadian former footballer
- Michael Duberry, (born 1975), English former footballer
- Steve DuBerry, English songwriter and music producer
- William Duberry, (born 1944), West former Indies cricketer
- Zain Silcott-Duberry (born 2005), English footballer

== See also ==
- Dubery
- Dewberry (disambiguation)
