= Illinois Air National Guard =

Unit of the US Air National Guard for the State of Illinois

- Shield of the Illinois Air National Guard
- Active: 1 July 1927 – present
- Country: United States
- Allegiance: Illinois
- Branch: Air National Guard
- Type: State militia, military reserve force
- Role: "To meet state and federal mission responsibilities."
- Part of: Illinois National Guard; United States National Guard Bureau; National Guard
- Garrison/HQ: Illinois Air National Guard, 1301 N. MacArthur Blvd, Springfield, Illinois, 62702

Commanders
- Civilian leadership: President Donald Trump (Commander-in-Chief); Troy Meink (Secretary of the Air Force); Governor JB Pritzker (Governor of the State of Illinois)
- State military leadership: TAG – Major General Daniel McDonough; ATAG – Major General Rodney Boyd

Aircraft flown
- Transport: C-130H Hercules
- Tanker: KC-135R Stratotanker

The Illinois Air National Guard (IL ANG) is the aerial militia of the State of Illinois, United States of America. It is a reserve of the United States Air Force and along with the Illinois Army National Guard, an element of the Illinois National Guard.

As state militia units, the units in the Illinois Air National Guard are not in the normal United States Air Force chain of command. They are under the jurisdiction of the governor of Illinois through the office of the Illinois Adjutant General unless they are federalized by order of the president of the United States. The Illinois Air National Guard is headquartered at Camp Lincoln, Springfield, led by its Commander, Major General Daniel (Dan) McDonough; Chief of Staff, Brigadier General Kevin Jacobs; and Command Chief Master Sergeant Marlon Burton.

== Overview ==
Under the "Total Force" concept, Illinois Air National Guard units are considered to be Air Reserve Components (ARC) of the United States Air Force (USAF). Illinois ANG units are trained and equipped by the Air Force and are operationally gained by a major command of the USAF if federalized. In addition, the Illinois Air National Guard forces are assigned to Air Expeditionary Forces and are subject to deployment tasking orders along with their active duty and Air Force Reserve counterparts in their assigned cycle deployment window.

Along with their federal reserve obligations, as state militia units the elements of the Illinois ANG are subject to being activated by order of the governor to provide protection of life and property, and preserve peace, order and public safety. State missions include disaster relief in times of earthquakes, hurricanes, floods and forest fires, search and rescue, protection of vital public services, and support to civil defense.

== Components ==
The Illinois Air National Guard consists of the following major units:

- 126th Air Refueling Wing

Established 1 July 1927 (as: 108th Observation Squadron); operates: KC-135R Stratotanker
Stationed at: Scott Air Force Base, Belleville
Gained by: Air Mobility Command
The 126th Air Refueling Wing provides air refueling support to major commands of the United States Air Force, as well as other U.S. military forces and the military forces of allied nations.

- 182d Airlift Wing

Established 21 June 1947 (as: 169th Fighter Squadron); operates: C-130H3 Hercules
Stationed at: Peoria Air National Guard Base
Gained by: Air Mobility Command
The 182nd Airlift Wing's C-130 Hercules mission is to perform tactical theater airlift missions of personnel and cargo.

- 183d Wing

Established 30 September 1948 (as: 170th Fighter Squadron), General Electric F110 Centralized Repair Facility (CRF)
Stationed at: Capital Airport Air National Guard Station, Springfield
Gained by: Air Force Materiel Command
A non-flying Wing, the 183d Wing is tasked with augmenting component Numbered Air Force (cNAF) in both the Air and Space Operations Centers (AOC) and the Air Force Forces staff (AFFOR), A1 thru A9.

== History ==
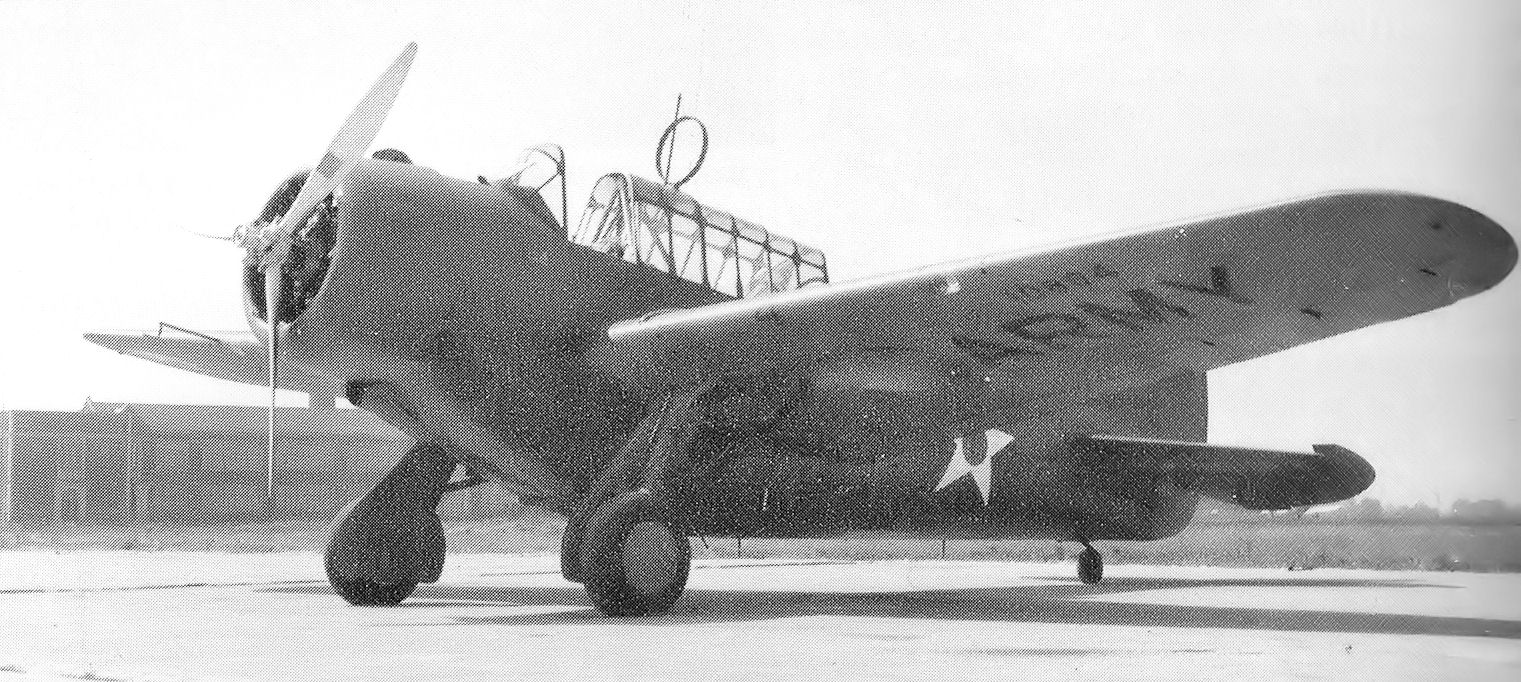
A North American O-47B of the 108th Observation Squadron at Midway Airport, 1942

The Militia Act of 1903 established the present National Guard system, units raised by the states but paid for by the Federal Government, liable for immediate state service. If federalized by Presidential order, they fall under the regular military chain of command. On 1 June 1920, the Militia Bureau issued Circular No.1 on the organization of National Guard air units.

The History of the Illinois Air National Guard is traced to an armory on Michigan Avenue and 16th Street in Chicago, in 1927. This was the first home of the 108th Observation Squadron, the oldest unit in the Illinois Air National Guard. The original 16 officers and 74 enlisted men were mostly World War I veterans from Chicago, flying PT-1 aircraft. From this small contingent grew a major operation that moved to Midway Municipal Airport.

=== World War II ===
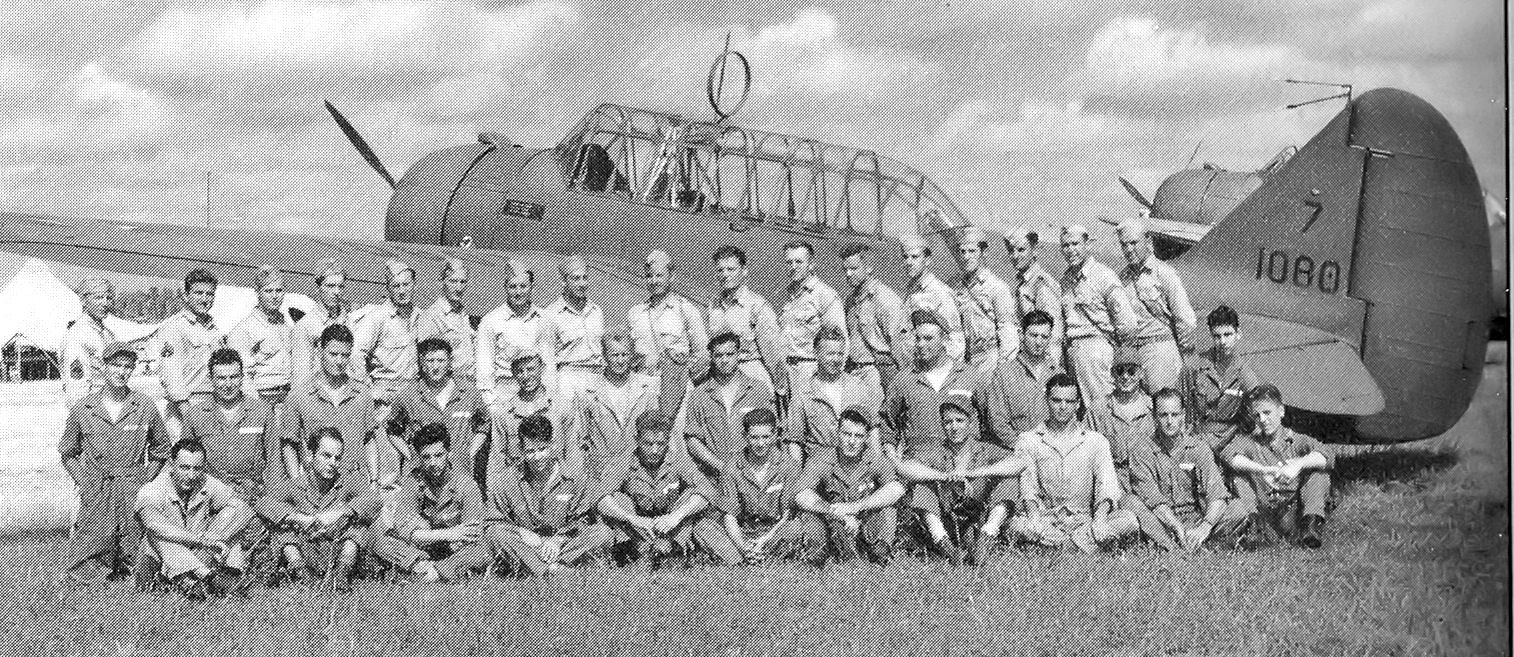
The maintenance crew of the 108th Observation Squadron at Howard Field, Panama, with an O-47

The unit distinguished itself in World War II, performing anti-submarine patrols in North American O-47 aircraft from a base near the Panama Canal. In September 1943, the unit was inactivated.

Another, later, Illinois ANG unit originated during World War II as the 304th Fighter Squadron, which was activated on 23 July 1942. The 304th FS was assigned to the 337th Fighter Group (FG) at the Pinellas County Airport, Florida, and served as an operational training unit equipped with the P-39 Airacobra and the P-40 Warhawk. The 304th FS was disbanded on 1 May 1944.

=== Illinois Air National Guard ===
On 24 May 1946, the United States Army Air Forces, in response to dramatic postwar military budget cuts imposed by President Harry S. Truman, allocated inactive unit designations to the National Guard Bureau for the formation of an Air Force National Guard. These unit designations were allotted and transferred to various State National Guard bureaus to provide them unit designations to re-establish them as Air National Guard units.

Led by Lt.Col. Ralph Pickering, the 169th FS held its first drill in December 1946, and it received federal recognition on 21 June 1947. By the end of the first year, the unit consisted of 40 officers and 215 airmen. The original base consisted of a shale runway and a single hangar for eight F-51D Mustang fighters, four AT-6 trainers, and a B-26 tow target plane. The first annual training was held at Midway Municipal Airport, with flying done at Douglas Field.

Lastly, on 30 September 1948, Federal recognition was granted to the 170th Fighter Squadron, the precursor to the 183d Fighter Wing, with 60 men meeting Thursday nights at the State Armory.

=== Korean War ===
During the Korean War, the 170th Fighter Squadron was ordered to federal duty for 21 months on 1 March 1951. Ten days later, the squadron deployed to Bergstrom Air Force Base, Texas. In April the unit was re-designated the 170th Fighter Bomber Squadron. On 31 July, the 170th moved to George Air Force Base, California and was assigned to the Tactical Air Command. The unit participated in Operation Longhorn, a joint Army-Air Force maneuver at Waco, Texas. In August 1952 the Squadron re-deployed to Springfield, Illinois.

On 1 April 1951 the 126th Bombardment Wing (Light), with units at O'Hare and Midway Airports, was ordered to federal duty for 21 months as part of the National Guard mobilizations for the Korean War. After 3 months of training, the unit moved to Langley Air Force Base, Virginia. On 30 October 1951 the wing flew their B-26 Invader bombers across the Atlantic Ocean to Bordeaux-Mérignac Air Base, France. In December, the Wing's remaining personnel and equipment arrived aboard the USS General H. F. Hodges.

The Wing participated in NATO exercises in several countries to include France, the United Kingdom, West Germany and Italy. On 12 May 1952 the 126th moved 90 km north of Paris to Laon-Couvron Air Base. On 1 January 1953, the 126th Bombardment Wing was released from federal service and returned home.

=== Cold War ===
In 1961, the 126th Air Refueling Group received the first aerial refueling mission in the Air National Guard, flying the KC-97 Stratocruiser. The KC-97 would take the 126th ARG back to Europe, refueling USAFE aircraft under operation "Creek Party" from 1967 to 1976. Some 600 trans-Atlantic flights were flown and 150 million pounds of fuel off-loaded to USAFE and NATO aircraft. It was the first time the Air National Guard had performed a continuous operation without activation.

The 169th FBS received its first federal activation for the Berlin Crisis of 1961. A year later, the 182d Tactical Fighter Group was formed and assumed control of the redesignated 169th Tactical Fighter Squadron. In May 1969, the 182d TFG was redesignated as the 182d Tactical Air Support Group. In January 1970, the wing received its first O-2A Skymaster aircraft. Members of the 182d TASG provided relief assistance during state active duty for the Canton tornado disaster in July 1975.

=== Gulf War 1991 ===
On 2 August 1990, Iraq invaded and occupied the neighboring country of Kuwait. This invasion brought a quick NATO response in the form of a massive military deployment to the Persian Gulf. By 7 August, the first U.S. troops were deployed to the Middle East in support of Operation Desert Shield. President George H. W. Bush called for limited reserve forces on 22 August, but did not activate Illinois National Guard units until September and November. The Illinois National Guard provided a total of 1,371 soldiers and airmen from both Army and Air National Guard units.

The Illinois Air National Guard's 126th Air Refueling Wing and 108th Air Refueling Squadron were also mobilized and actively participated in the "Air Bridge" between the United States and the Persian Gulf. The 126th flew 546 missions and delivered more than 27.3 million pounds of fuel to more than 2,880 U.S. and Allied aircraft in support of the Desert Shield Tanker Task Force. In addition to refueling such aircraft as the F-16 and A-10, the units transported military passengers and cargo. The 182nd Tactical Air Support Group was responsible for security at Peoria Airport, MacDill Air Force Base, Florida and Luke Air Force Base, Arizona. The 169th Tactical Air Support Squadron deployed 20 soldiers to Fort Hood, Texas and Fort Irwin, California to support National Guard training.

=== Humanitarian missions ===
On 16 July 1993, the Governor of Illinois ordered 270 members of the 126th Air Refueling Wing to State Active Duty to support the Illinois National Guard's flood control mission during the Great Flood of 1993. Members patrolled levees, sandbagged boils and provided security on a 24 hours basis. Many guardsmen aided in evacuation of residents. Medical personnel aided thousands. The unit had members in Alton, Anna, Carrollton, Carbondale, Cahokia, East St. Louis, East Carondelet, Edwardsville, Evansville, Grafton, Granite City, Hartford, Jerseyville, Murphysboro, Prairie du Rocher, Quincy, Springfield, and Winchester. By the time the crisis was under control in the early fall, over 700 personnel from the 126th Air Refueling Wing and assigned units had pulled duty in the flood ravaged towns.

In 1996, the 182nd AW wing began participation in ongoing flying missions for Operation Joint Endeavor in Bosnia.

=== War on Terror ===
After the September 11 attacks 2001, Illinois ANG members were called up to support the USAF at various locations around the world. During a September 2002 deployment to Oman, 182nd AW aircraft flew combat supply missions into Afghanistan for Operation Enduring Freedom. On 29 March 2003, SSgt Jacob Frazier of the 169th Air Support Operations Squadron was killed in action while serving with United States Army Special Forces in Afghanistan. He was the first member of the 182nd AW to die in combat.

In March 2003, immediately following mobilization, six Illinois ANG C-130 aircraft and over 350 personnel were deployed to Minhad, United Arab Emirates, for Operation Iraqi Freedom. These airmen returned in August after providing airlift support throughout the theater. Since that mobilization, smaller numbers of wing personnel and aircraft have continually supported Operations Enduring Freedom and Iraqi Freedom. On 28 December 2003, a 182nd AW crew delivered earthquake relief supplies to Iran, becoming the first U.S. aircraft to land there since 1981.

The 183rd FW conducted numerous overseas deployments, including six to Southwest Asia/Iraq, two to Denmark, one to Panama, one to Curaçao, and one to Thailand. As a result of the 2005 Base Realignment and Closure recommendations, the United States Department of Defense changed the mission of the 183rd FW, the last F-16 departed on 23 September 2008.

== See also ==
- Illinois Naval Militia
- Illinois Reserve Militia
- Illinois Wing Civil Air Patrol
