= 182nd Airlift Wing =

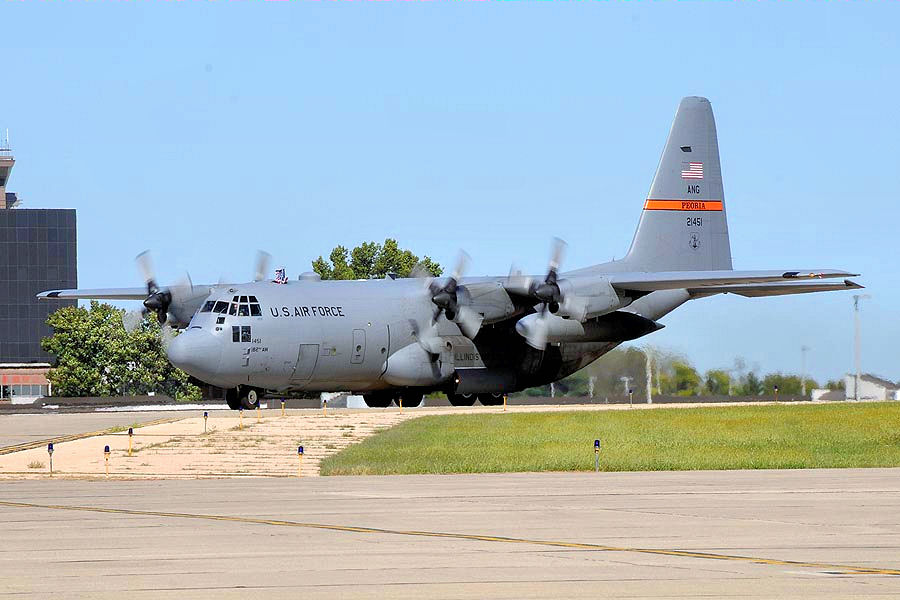
- C-130 of the 182nd Airlift Wing taxiing at Peoria Air National Guard Base
- Active: 1946-Present
- Country: United States
- Branch: Air National Guard
- Type: Wing
- Role: Airlift
- Part of: Illinois Air National Guard
- Garrison/HQ: Peoria Air National Guard Base, Peoria, Illinois
- Motto: Defenders of Freedom
- Tail Code: "Peoria" Orange stripe
- Decorations: Outstanding Unit Award with nine oak leaf clusters
- Website: https://www.182aw.ang.af.mil/

Commanders
- Current commander: Col. Rusty L. Ballard

Insignia
- 182 AW Emblem

The 182d Airlift Wing (182 AW) is a unit of the Illinois Air National Guard, stationed at Peoria Air National Guard Base, Peoria, Illinois. If activated to federal service, the Wing is gained by the United States Air Force Air Mobility Command.

== Overview ==
The 182nd Airlift Wing's C-130H3 Hercules mission is to perform the tactical portion of the airlift mission. The aircraft is capable of operating from rough, dirt strips and is the prime transport for air dropping troops and equipment into hostile areas. The 182nd Airlift Wing's mission is to provide the president of the United States, the governor of the state of Illinois and the adjutant general of Illinois Airmen capable of providing C-130 airland and airdrop; joint terminal attack control and support; command, control and communications; logistics; civil engineering; security; and support services for the nation, state of Illinois, and domestic community.

== Units ==
The 182d Airlift Wing consists of the following units:

- 182d Operations Group

169th Airlift Squadron

- 182d Maintenance Group
- 182d Mission Support Group
- 182d Medical Group
- 182d Air Support Operations Group
- 264th Combat Communications Squadron

== History ==
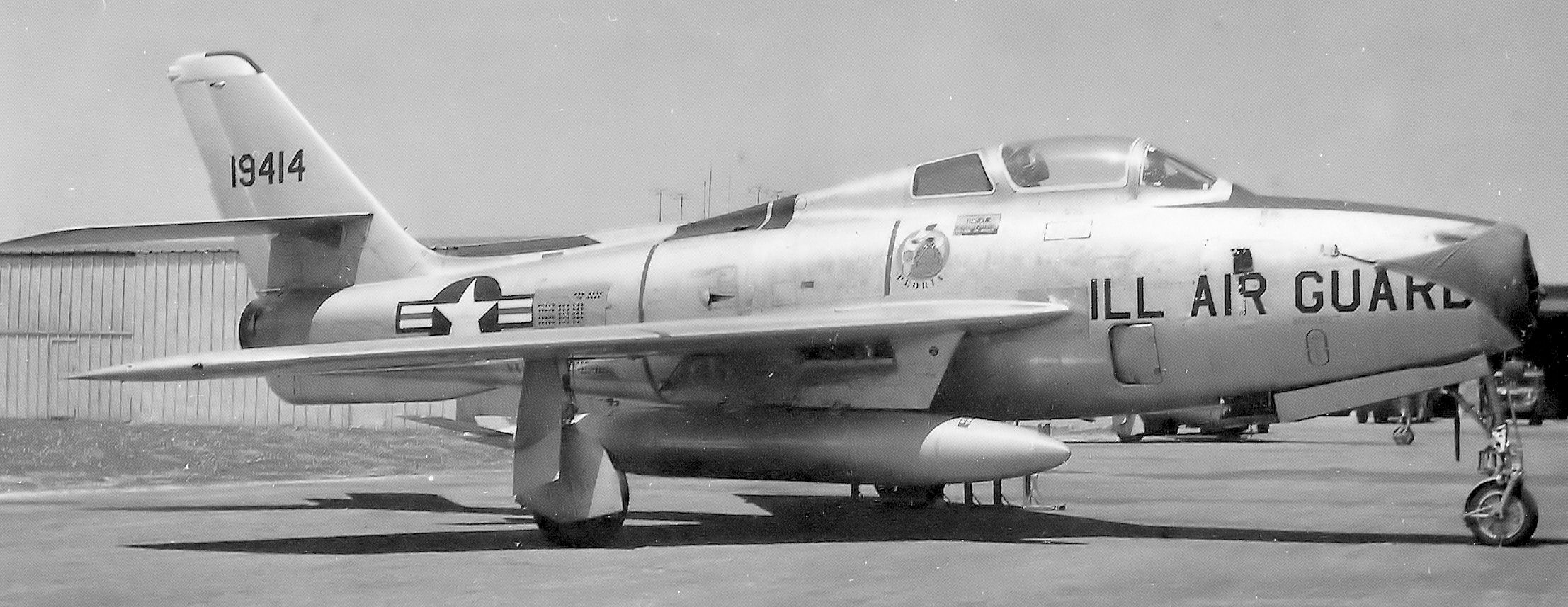
169th TFS F-84F 51-9414

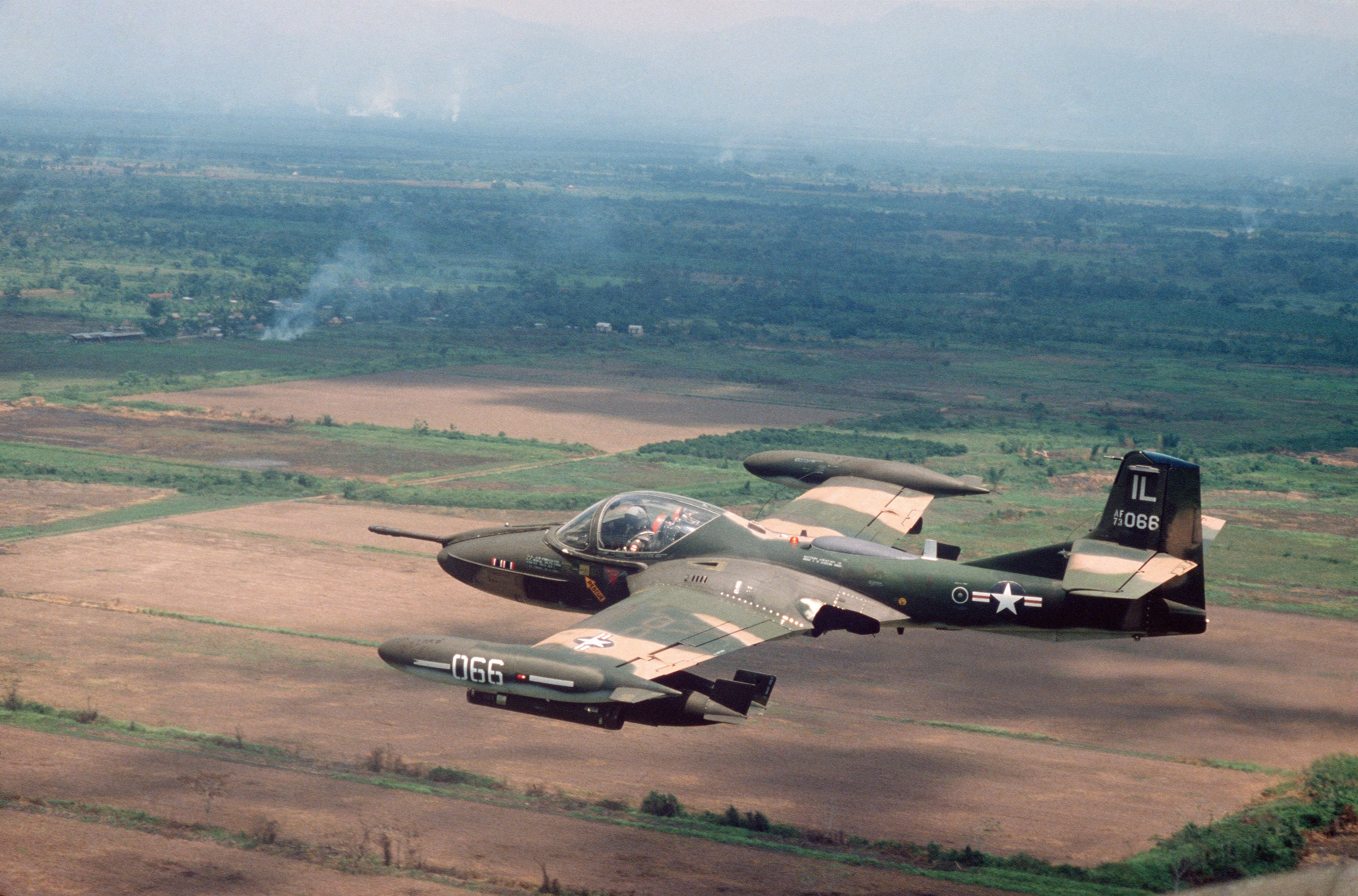
OA-37B Dragonfly aircraft from the 169th Tactical Air Support Squadron, 1984

What is now the 169th Airlift Squadron originated during World War II as the 304th Fighter Squadron, which was activated on 23 July 1942. The 304th was assigned to the 337th Fighter Group at the Pinellas County Airport, Florida, and served as an operational training unit equipped with the P-39 Airacobra and the P-40 Warhawk. The 304th was disbanded 1 May 1944, and reconstituted 24 May 1946, re-designated the 169th Fighter Squadron and allocated to the Illinois National Guard.

The 169th Fighter Squadron held its first drill in December 1946 under the command of Lt. Col. Ralph Pickering, and it received federal recognition on 21 June 1947. The unit consisted of 40 officers and 215 Airmen by the end of its first year. The original base consisted of a shale runway and a single hangar for eight F-51 Mustang fighters, four AT- 6 Texan trainers and a B-26 Marauder tow target plane. The first annual training was held at Chicago Municipal Airport, now known as Chicago Midway International Airport, with flying done at Douglas Field, now known as O'Hare International Airport. In 1952, the 169th Fighter Squadron was re-designated the 169th Fighter Interceptor Squadron and then the 169th Fighter Bomber Squadron.

A large construction project had expanded the base facilities by 1953, and in 1954 the 169th obtained the copyright for the Indian Chief, the cartoon character from Walt Disney's feature film "Peter Pan", to display as their emblem. The squadron received its first F-84F Thunderstreak in 1958.

The unit flew the first ever Air National Guard air- to-air refueling mission in 1961. On 15 October 1962, the Illinois Air National Guard authorized the 169th Tactical Fighter Squadron to expand to a group level, and the 182d Tactical Fighter Group was established by the National Guard Bureau on 15 October 1962. The 169th TFS became the group's flying squadron, equipped with F-84F Thunderstreaks. Other squadrons assigned into the group were the 182d Headquarters, 182d Material Squadron (Maintenance), 182d Combat Support Squadron, and the 182d USAF Dispensary.

During the 1960s the squadron continued to operate its F-84F Thunderstreaks, and the unit was not activated during the Vietnam War. In May 1969, the F-84Fs were retired and 182d TFG was re-designated as the 182d Tactical Air Support Group (TASG); flying Forward Air Control (FAC) missions. The 169th was equipped with light observation U-3A/B Blue Canoe and in January 1970, the O-2A Skymaster aircraft. The group's mission being to perform visual reconnaissance, as the FAC flew light aircraft slowly over the rough terrain at low altitude to maintain constant aerial surveillance over a combat area. By patrolling the same area constantly, the FACs grew very familiar with the terrain, and they learned to detect any changes that could indicate enemy forces hiding below. Members of the 182d TASG provided relief assistance during state active duty for the Canton tornado disaster in July 1975. In 1976, the 182d TASG was awarded its first Air Force Outstanding Unit Award.

In 1979, the squadron received OA-37B Dragonfly jet FAC aircraft from the New York and Maine Air National Guard, continuing the FAC mission. The 182d TASG received an "Excellent" rating on its first Operational Readiness Inspection (ORI) under the 12th Air Force, and the group was awarded its second Air Force Outstanding Unit award in 1985. In January 1991, 138 group personnel were called to active duty during the 1991 Gulf War and deployed to United States Central Command Air Forces (CENTAF).

=== Post Cold War era ===
In March 1992 the A-37s were finally retired. and the group received the Block 15 F-16A/B Fighting Falcon Air Defense Fighter (ADF). It was re-designated as the 182d Fighter Group on 15 March. In June 1993, members served on state active duty in response to the Mississippi River flooding of southern Illinois.

Due to government budget constraints and military restructuring after the Cold War, the 182d FG converted to the C-130E Hercules and was re-designated the 182d Airlift Wing (AW) effective 1 October 1995. In 1996, the wing began participation in ongoing flying missions for Operation Joint Endeavor in Bosnia. In 1997, the 182d AW celebrated its 50th anniversary and received an "Excellent" in its first Air Mobility Command (AMC) ORI.

=== Global War on Terrorism ===
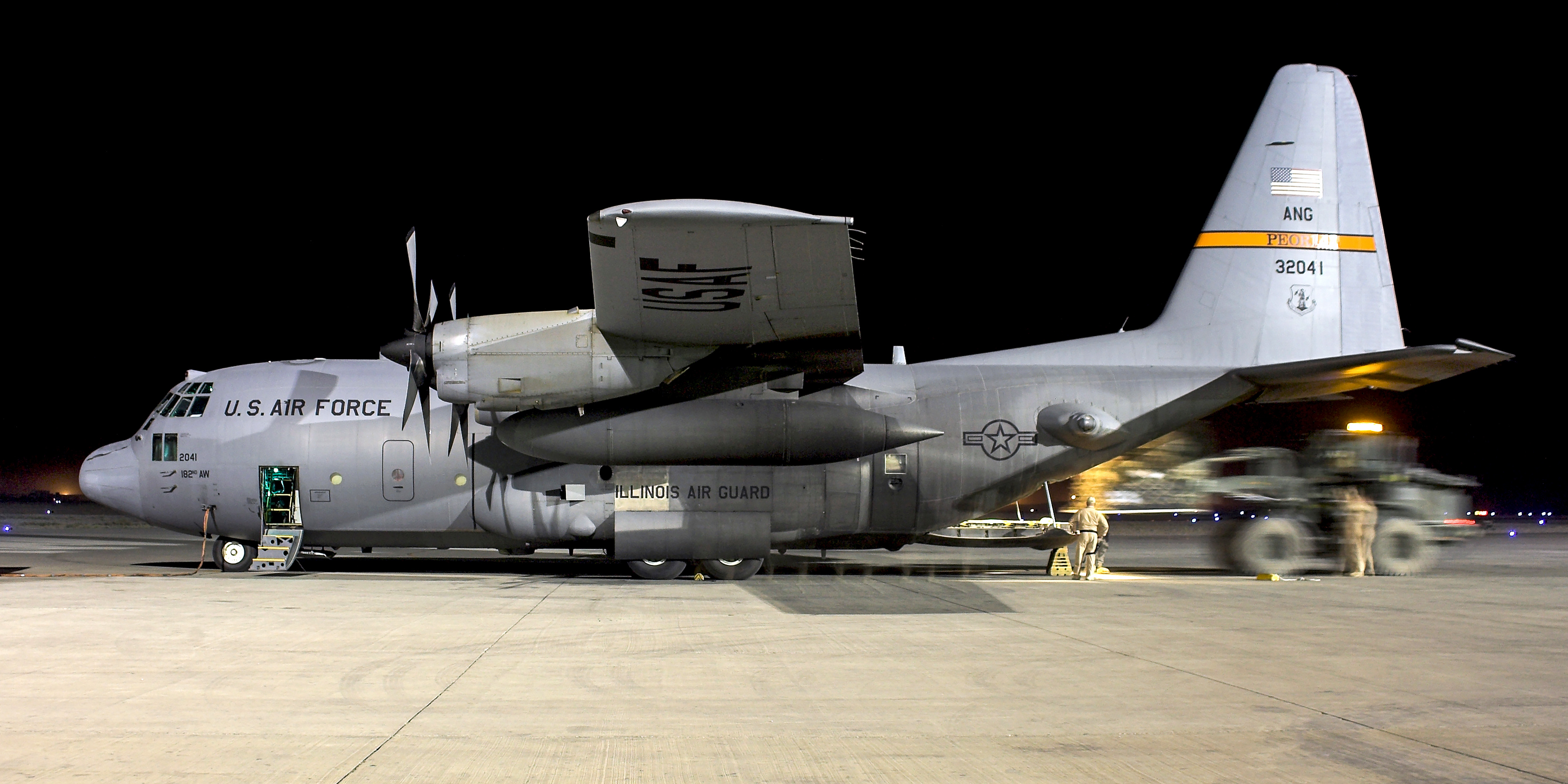
C-130H3 at Kandahar, 2010

After the September 11 attacks, members of the wing were called up to support the Air Force at various locations around the world. During a September 2002 deployment to Oman, wing aircraft flew combat supply missions into Afghanistan for Operation Enduring Freedom. On 29 March 2003, SSgt Jacob Frazier of the 169th Air Support Operations Squadron (ASOS) was killed in action while serving with Army Special Forces in Afghanistan. He was the first member of the wing to die in combat.

In March 2003, immediately following mobilization, six aircraft and over 350 personnel were deployed to Minhad, United Arab Emirates, for Operation Iraqi Freedom. These airmen returned in August after providing airlift support throughout the theater. Since that mobilization, smaller numbers of wing personnel and aircraft have continually supported Operations Enduring Freedom and Iraqi Freedom. On 28 December 2003, a wing crew delivered earthquake relief supplies to Iran, becoming the first US aircraft to land there since 1981.

Beginning in January 2005, the wing converted from the C-130E to the newer H3 model. In October 2006, the wing received a rating of "Excellent" after serving as the lead wing during an AMC ORI. On 3 February 2007, the wing was awarded its third Air Force Outstanding Unit Award for the period from 1 August 2003 to 31 July 2005. Some personnel remain deployed to combat zones as part of Air and Space Expeditionary units while other members of the wing continue routine worldwide support to the Air Force.

In 2017, 182d deployed four C-130H3 aircraft together with maintenance and aircrew to an undisclosed location in Southwest Asia for a four-month Operation Inherent Resolve deployment, supporting U.S. and Iraqi forces in Iraq.

July 2019 saw 182d participate in the annual Exercise Northern Strike 19 in Northern Michigan. Crew undertook missions included simulated attacks from surface to air missiles and cargo air drops coordinated with ground JTACs. The wing's aircraft were operating from the Alpena Combat Readiness Training Center in Alpena, Michigan.

=== Lineage ===
- Designated 169th Fighter Squadron and allotted to Illinois ANG, 24 May 1946 -Extended federal recognition, 21 June 1947
- Re-designated: 169th Fighter Interceptor Squadron, 1952
- Re-designated: 169th Fighter Bomber Squadron, 1952
- Re-designated: 182d Tactical Fighter Group, 1962
- Re-designated: 182d Tactical Air Support Group, 16 May 1969
- Re-designated: 182d Fighter Group, July 1992
- Re-designated: 182d Airlift Wing, 1 October 1995

=== Assignments ===
- Illinois Air National Guard, 15 October 1962 – Present

Gained by: Tactical Air Command
Gained by: Air Combat Command, 1 June 1992
Gained by: Air Mobility Command, 1 October 1995-Present

=== Components ===
- 182d Operations Group, 1 October 1995 – Present
- 169th Tactical Fighter (later Fighter, Airlift) Squadron, 24 May 1946 – Present

=== Stations ===
- Greater Peoria Airport, Illinois, 24 May 1946

Designated: Peoria Air National Guard Base, Illinois, 1991-Present

=== Aircraft ===
- AT-11 Kansan, 1947–1947
- A-26C Invader, 1947–1952
- F-51D/H Mustang, 1947–1956
- T-6G Texan, 1947–1956
- VC/C-47 Gooney Bird, 1949–1972
- Lockheed T-33 Thunderbird, 1955–1969
- T-28A Trojan, 1956–1958
- F-80C Shooting Star, 1958–1958
- F-84F Thunderstreak, 1962–1969
- U-3A/B Blue Canoe, 1969–1970
- O-2A Skymaster, 1970–1979
- OA-37B Dragonfly, 1979–1992
- F-16A/B Fighting Falcon, 1992–1995
- C-130E Hercules, 1995–2007
- C-130H3 Hercules, 2005–present

=== Decorations ===
- Air Force Outstanding Unit Award
