= Dubery =

Dubery is a toponymic surname, from Dewsbury. Notable people with the surname include:

- David Dubery (born 1948), South-African born British composer, pianist, vocal coach, and academic
- Harry Dubery, British labour movement activist

== See also ==
- Duberry
