= William Dewberry =

American baseball player

- Pitcher
- Born: September 5, 1874; Rome, Georgia, U.S.
- Died: September 1, 1946 (aged 71); Chicago, Illinois, U.S.

Negro league baseball debut
- 1908, for the Leland Giants

Last appearance
- 1908, for the Leland Giants

Teams
- Leland Giants (1908)

William Dewberry (September 5, 1874 – September 1, 1946) was an American Negro league pitcher in the 1900s.

A native of Rome, Georgia, Dewberry played for the Leland Giants in 1908. In five recorded appearances on the mound, he posted a 4.95 ERA over 40 innings. Dewberry died in Chicago, Illinois in 1946 at age 71.
