= Dewsbury (disambiguation) =

Dewsbury is a market town within the Metropolitan Borough of Kirklees, in West Yorkshire, England.

Dewsbury may also refer to:

- Dewsbury (UK Parliament constituency)

== People with the surname ==
- Al Dewsbury (1926–2006), Canadian ice hockey player
- Donald Dewsbury (1939–2025), American psychologist and historian
- Kiernan Dewsbury-Hall (born 1998), English football player
- Ralph Dewsbury (1882–1921), British film director
- William Dewsbury (c. 1621–1688), English Quaker minister
