= Peoria Air National Guard Base =

- Near Peoria, Illinois in the United States
- C-130H Hercules of the Illinois Air National Guard's 182nd Airlift Wing taxiing at Peoria Air National Guard Base during 2013.

Site information
- Type: Air National Guard base
- Owner: Department of Defense
- Operator: US Air Force (USAF)
- Controlled by: Illinois Air National Guard
- Condition: Operational
- Website: www.182aw.ang.af.mil

Location
- Location in the United States
- Coordinates: 40°39′31.7″N 89°41′52.3″W

Garrison information
- Garrison: 182nd Airlift Wing

Airfield information
- Identifiers: IATA: PIA, ICAO: KPIA, FAA LID: PIA, WMO: 725320
- Elevation: 201.4 metres (661 ft) AMSL
Runways
| Direction | Length and surface |
|---|---|
| 13/31 | 3,079.6 metres (10,104 ft) Concrete |
| 4/22 | 2,439.6 metres (8,004 ft) Asphalt |
- Airfield shared with General Wayne A. Downing Peoria International Airport; Source: Federal Aviation Administration

Peoria Air National Guard Base, located in Peoria County, Illinois, is the base of the 182d Airlift Wing (182 AW), an Air Mobility Command (AMC)-gained unit of the Illinois Air National Guard and "host" wing for the installation. Located at Peoria International Airport, at this joint civil-military airport.

== Overview ==
The 182d Airlift Wing air mobility mission is the ability to rapidly move personnel and equipment anywhere in the world when needed, and to sustain that force for as long as needed. This will include the strategic airlift of personnel and cargo, tactical airdrop of personnel, equipment and supplies and the transport of litters and ambulatory patients during aeromedical evacuations when required.

The wing's C-130H3 Hercules primarily performs the tactical portion of the airlift mission. The aircraft is capable of operating from rough, dirt strips and is the prime transport for airdropping troops and equipment into hostile areas.

== Units ==
The 182d Airlift Wing consists of the following units:

- 182d Operations Group

169th Airlift Squadron

- 182nd Air Support Operations Group
- 168th Air Support Operations Squadron
- 169th Air Support Operations Squadron
- 264th Combat Communications Squadron
- 566th Air Force Band

== Base Commander ==
- Colonel Daniel R. McDonough - November 2017 – Present

== See also ==
- List of USAF Aerospace Defense Command General Surveillance Radar Stations
