= 126th Air Refueling Wing =

Unit of the Illinois Air National Guard

126th Air Refueling Wing

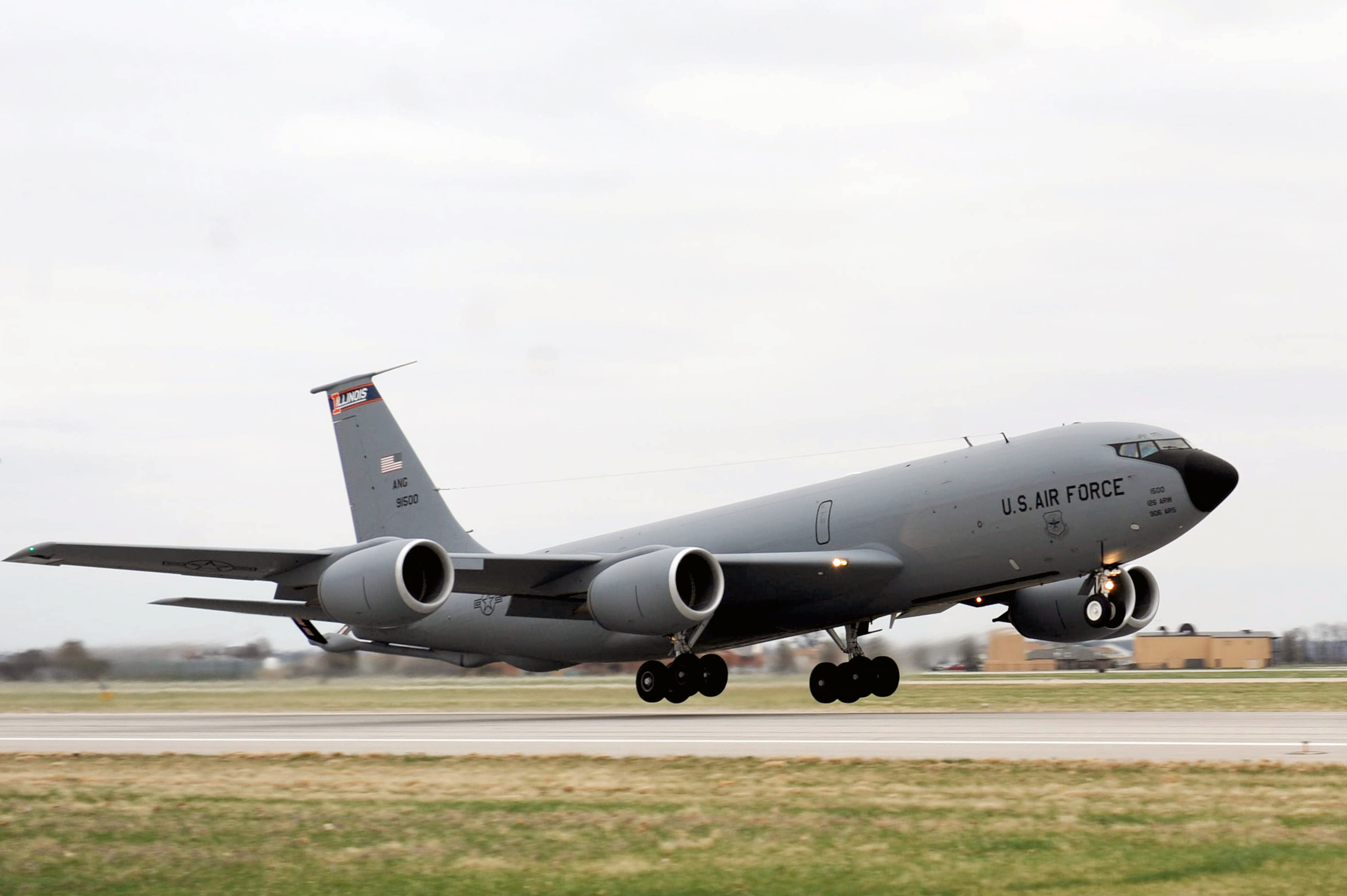
- 126th Air Refueling Wing KC-135 59–1500 taking off to a forward deployed location in support of Joint Task Force Odyssey Dawn, 24 March 2011
- Active: 1950–1953; 1953–present
- Country: United States
- Allegiance: Illinois
- Branch: Air National Guard
- Type: Wing
- Role: Aerial refueling
- Part of: Illinois Air National Guard
- Garrison/HQ: Scott Air Force Base, Illinois
- Motto(s): Anytime, Anywhere

Commanders
- Current commander: Colonel Nicolas Henschel

Insignia
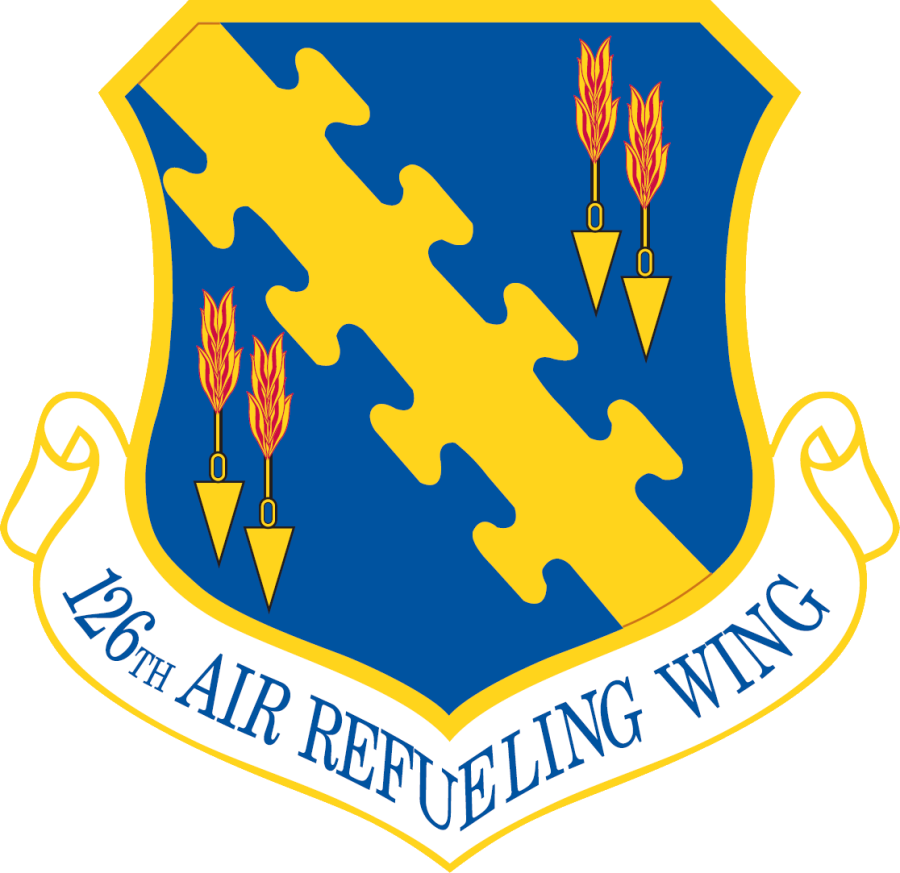
- 126th Air Refueling Wing emblem

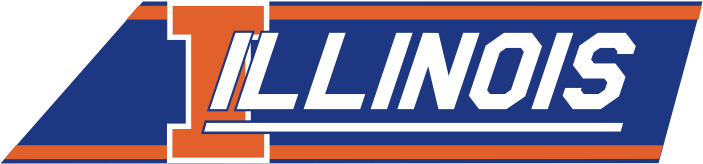
- Tail stripe

Aircraft flown
- Tanker: KC-135R

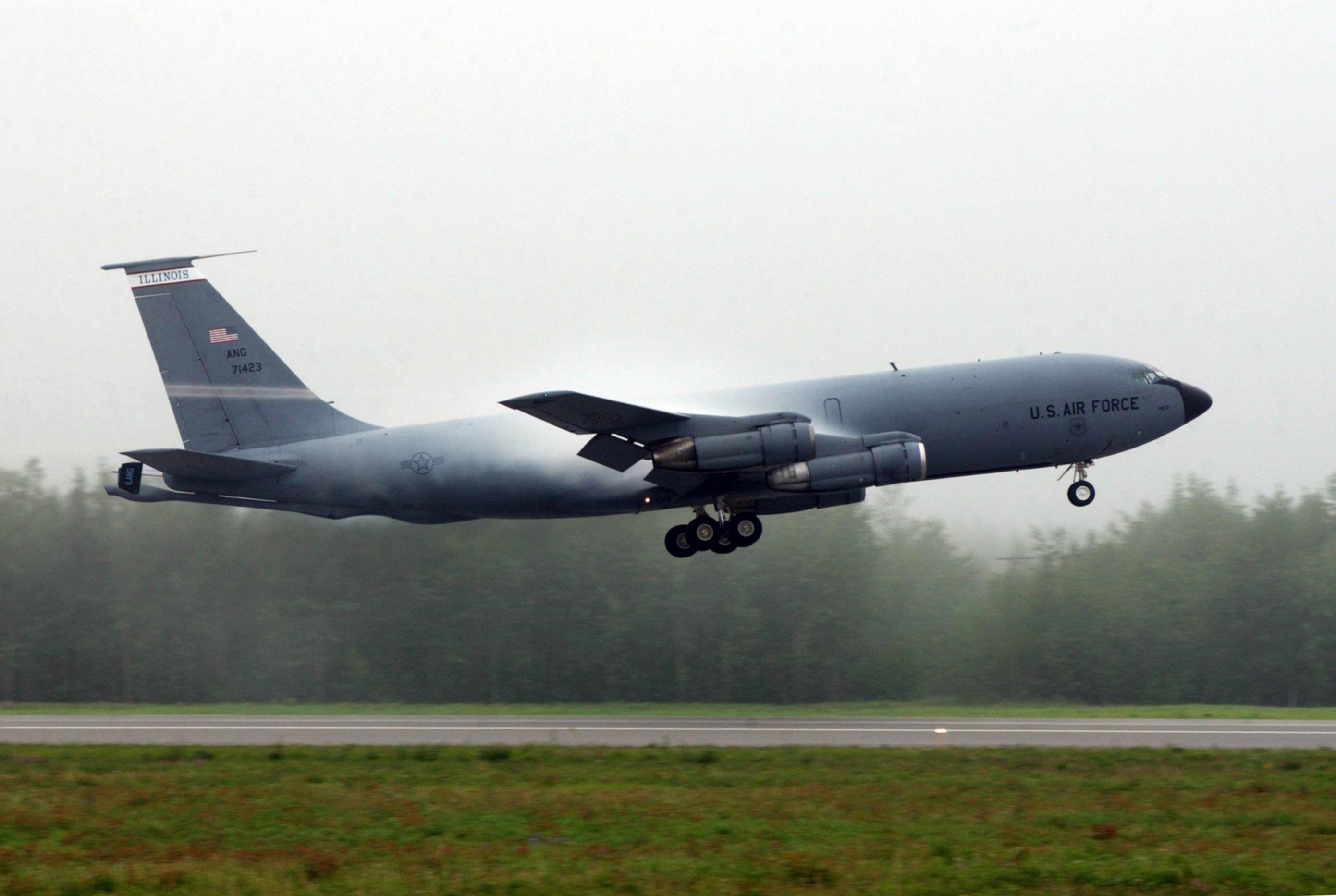
A 126th ARW KC-135E taking off from Eielson AFB Alaska, in 2004.

The 126th Air Refueling Wing is a unit of the Illinois Air National Guard. It is stationed at Scott Air Force Base, Belleville, Illinois. If activated to federal service, the Wing is gained by the United States Air Force Air Mobility Command.

The 108th Air Refueling Squadron, assigned to the Wing's 126th Operations Group, is a descendant organization of the World War I 108th Aero Squadron, established on 27 August 1917. It was reformed on 1 July 1927, as the 108th Observation Squadron, and is one of the 29 original National Guard Observation Squadrons of the United States Army National Guard formed before World War II.

== Mission ==
The primary mission of the 126th Air Refueling Wing is to provide air refueling support to major commands of the United States Air Force, as well as other U.S. military forces and the military forces of allied nations. Additionally, the unit can support airlift missions. The unit is also tasked with supporting the nuclear strike missions of the Single Integrated Operational Plan.

During peacetime, the 126th ARW receives direction through the adjutant general of Illinois, the governor of Illinois and the National Guard Bureau. Upon federal mobilization, the wing is assigned to Air Mobility Command and the 15th Expeditionary Mobility Task Force.

== Units ==
- 126th Operations Group

108th Air Refueling Squadron

- 126th Maintenance Group
- 126th Mission Support Group
- 126th Medical Group
- 126th Comptroller Flight

The 126 ARW also has two associate partners: the Active Associate 906th Air Refueling Squadron with the 126 ARW serving as the host organization for this Total Force Initiative association, and the Classic Associate 126th Supply Chain Management Squadron as part of a regionalized Air Mobility Command supply facility.

== History ==
For associated history, see 126th Operations Group

=== Cold War ===
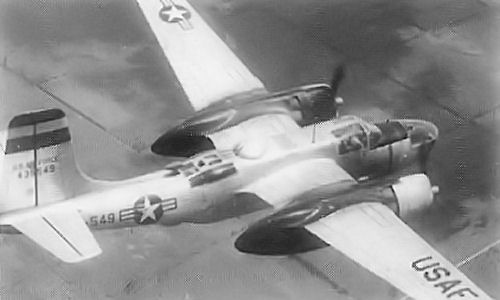
B-26C as flown by the wing

The wing was activated as the 126th Composite Wing on 1 November 1950, as the Air National Guard converted to the Wing Base Organization model of the regular Air Force. The wing lost its fighter unit and became the 126th Bombardment Wing in February 1951. The unit was ordered to active service on 1 April 1951 as a result of the Korean War. The unit was initially assigned to Tactical Air Command at Langley Air Force Base, Virginia.

The wing moved to Bordeaux-Merignac Air Base, France with the first elements arriving in November 1951. It was assigned to Twelfth Air Force. By 10 November, Bordeaux was considered an operational base. The 126th was assigned the 108th, 168th and 180th Bombardment Squadrons. The aircraft were marked by various color bands on the vertical stabilizer and rudder. Black/Yellow/Blue for the 108th; Black/Yellow/Red for the 168th, and Black/Yellow/Green for the 180th. It flew B-26's for training and maneuvers and stayed at Bordeaux until moving to Laon-Couvron Air Base, France on 25 May 1952 where it remained for the balance of the year. The 126th was relieved from active duty and inactivated on 1 January 1953, transferring its personnel and equipment to the 38th Bombardment Wing, which was simultaneously activated. It was activated in the Illinois Air National Guard the same day as the 126th Fighter-Bomber Group. It flew North American F-86 Sabres. In 1955, it was redesignated the 126th Fighter-Interceptor Wing, and equipped with F-86Ds. In 1958, it was reorganized along the lines of active duty Air Defense Command units, becoming the 126th Air Defense Wing.

On 1 July 1961, the 126th's mission was changed to air refueling one and it was redesignated the 126th Air Refueling Wing, flying Boeing KC-97 Stratofreighter aircraft. The 126th flew KC-97Ls for a brief time before converting to Boeing KC-135A Stratotankers. In 1978 the KC-97s were sent to AMARC. Many of the 126th's KC-97Ls became gate guards and one is on the field of the former Grissom Air Force Base, Indiana, where the 126th conducted many hours of transition practice.

In 1983 the wing began receiving the KC-135E as a replacement for the KC-135A model "water-wagons", a named used because of 110 seconds of water injection, used to increase thrust for take-off power. With the inactivation of SAC, the group was gained by Air Mobility Command on 1 June 1992.

=== Post Cold War ===
The 126th moved from the former Air Reserve Station at O'Hare International Airport in 1999 as recommended by the Base Realignment and Closure Commission's Report to Congress in conjunction with the closure of the Air Force Reserve and Air National Guard facilities at O'Hare. In 2000, the unit's KC-135E aircraft were upgraded with the new Pacer CRAG (Compass, Radar & GPS) avionics systems. In 2008, the unit completed a transition to KC-135R aircraft as the KC-135E fleet was retired.

== Lineage ==
- Established as the 126th Composite Wing and allotted to the Air National Guard on 31 October 1950

Organized and received federal recognition on 1 November 1950
Redesignated: 126th Bombardment Wing, Light on 1 February 1951
Federalized and ordered to active service on 1 April 1951
Released from active duty and inactivated on 1 January 1953

- Redesignated 126th Fighter-Bomber Wing and activated in the Air National Guard on 1 January 1953

Redesignated 126th Fighter-Interceptor Wing on 1 July 1955
Redesignated 126th Air Defense Wing c. 10 March 1958
Redesignated 126th Air Refueling Wing, Tactical on 1 July 1961
Redesignated 126th Air Refueling Wing, Medium
Redesignated 126th Air Refueling Wing, Heavy on 1 January 1977
Redesignated 126th Air Refueling Wing c. 16 March 1992

=== Assignments ===
- Illinois Air National Guard, 31 October 1950

Gained by: Tactical Air Command

- Tenth Air Force, 1 April 1951
- Ninth Air Force, April 1951
- Twelfth Air Force, December 1951 – 1 January 1953
- Illinois Air National Guard, 1 January 1953 – present

Gained by: Tactical Air Command, 1 January 1953
Gained by: Air Defense Command, 1 July 1955
Gained by: Tactical Air Command, 1 July 1961
Gained by: Strategic Air Command, 1 July 1976
Gained by: Air Combat Command, 30 June 1992
Gained by: Air Mobility Command, 1 Oct 1993 – present

=== Components ===
Groups

- 115th Fighter Group, c. 11 March 1958 – c. 1 December 1958 Truax Field
- 126th Air Base Group (later 126th Support Group, 126th Mission Support Group), 1 November 1950 – 1 January 1953, 1 January 1953 – c. 10 March 1958, c. 1 January 1993 – present
- 126th Composite Group (later 126th Bombardment Group, 126th Fighter-Bomber Group, 126th Fighter-Interceptor Group, 126th Fighter Group, 126th Air Refueling Group, 126th Operations Group, 1 November 1951 – 9 January 1974, c. 1 January 1993 – present
- 126th Maintenance & Supply Group (later 126th Logistics Group, 126th Maintenance Group), 1 November 1950 – 1 January 1953, 1 January 1953 – c. 10 March 1958, c. 1 January 1993 – present
- 126th Medical Group (later 126th Tactical Hospital), 1 November 1950 – 1 January 1953, 1 January 1953 – c. 10 March 1958, c. 1 January 1993 – present
- 128th Air Refueling Group, c. 1 August 1961 – c. 16 October 1995 Billy Mitchell Field
- 134th Fighter Group (later 134th Air Refueling Group), 7 December 1957 – c. 1 April 1961, c. 18 April 1964 – c. 1 October 1964 McGhee Tyson Airport
- 145th Fighter Group, 20 August 1958 – 1 January 1961 Morris Field
- 151st Air Refueling Group, 20 October 1972 – c. 16 March 1992 Salt Lake City International Airport
- 160th Air Refueling Group, 8 July 1961 – c. 1 October 1972 Clinton County Airport
- 190th Air Refueling Group, 8 July 1978 – c. 16 October 1995 Forbes Field

Operational Squadrons

- 108th Air Refueling Squadron, 9 January 1974 – c. 1 January 1993

=== Stations ===
- Chicago Municipal Airport, Illinois 1 November 1951 – 1 April 1951
- Langley Air Force Base, Virginia, 1 April – 1 November 1951
- Bordeaux-Merignac Air Base, France 1 November 1951 – 25 May 1952
- Laon-Couvron Air Base, France, 25 May 1952 – 31 December 1952
- Chicago Municipal Airport (Later moved to O'Hare IAP) Illinois, 1 January 1953 – 31 July 1999
- Scott Air Force Base, Illinois, 31 July 1999 – present

=== Aircraft ===
- Douglas A-26 Invader, 1945
- North American F-51D Mustang, 1953–1955
- Republic F-84F Thunderstreak, 1955–1957
- North American F-86 Sabre, 1957–1958
- Boeing KC-97 Stratofreighter, 1961–1976
- Boeing KC-135 Stratotanker (1976–present)

== See also ==
- List of A-26 Invader operators
