= Peoria International Airport =

General Wayne A. Downing Peoria International Airport

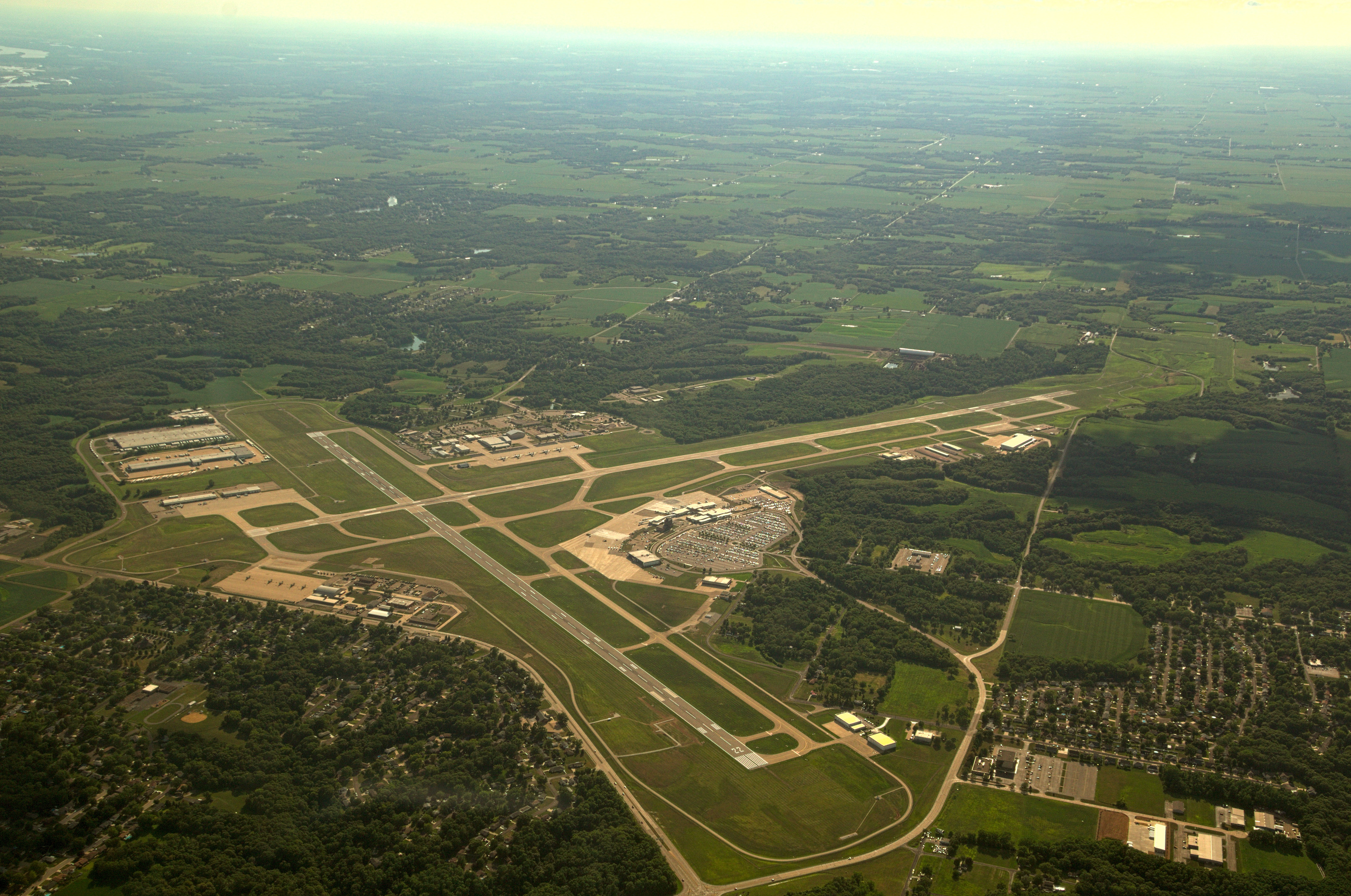
- An aerial view of Peoria International Airport
- IATA: PIA; ICAO: KPIA; FAA LID: PIA; WMO: 72532

Summary
- Airport type: Public
- Owner/Operator: Metropolitan Airport Authority of Peoria
- Serves: Peoria, Illinois
- Location: Limestone Township, Peoria County
- Opened: May 19 1932; 94 years ago
- Elevation AMSL: 661 ft (201 m)
- Coordinates: 40°39′51″N 089°41′36″W
- Website: www.FlyPIA.com

Maps
- FAA airport diagram
- Interactive map of General Wayne A. Downing Peoria International Airport

Runways
Direction	Length		Surface
Direction	ft	m	Surface
13/31	10,104	3,080	Concrete
4/22	8,004	2,440	Asphalt

Statistics (2025)
- Total passengers: 812,396
- Aircraft operations: 38,805 (2023)
- Based aircraft (2023): 63
- Sources: Airport and FAA

General Wayne A. Downing Peoria International Airport (IATA: PIA, ICAO: KPIA, FAA LID: PIA) is a civil/military public airport five miles west of downtown Peoria, in Peoria County, Illinois, United States. It is on the northwest edge of Bartonville, near Bellevue. It is owned by the Metropolitan Airport Authority of Peoria, which often refers to it as Peoria International Airport. It was formerly the Greater Peoria Regional Airport.

The Federal Aviation Administration (FAA) National Plan of Integrated Airport Systems for 2017–2021 categorized it as a non-hub primary commercial service facility. In 2025, Peoria International Airport had a record-breaking 812,396 passengers fly through the airport - nearly an 18% increase over the previous passenger record.

== History ==
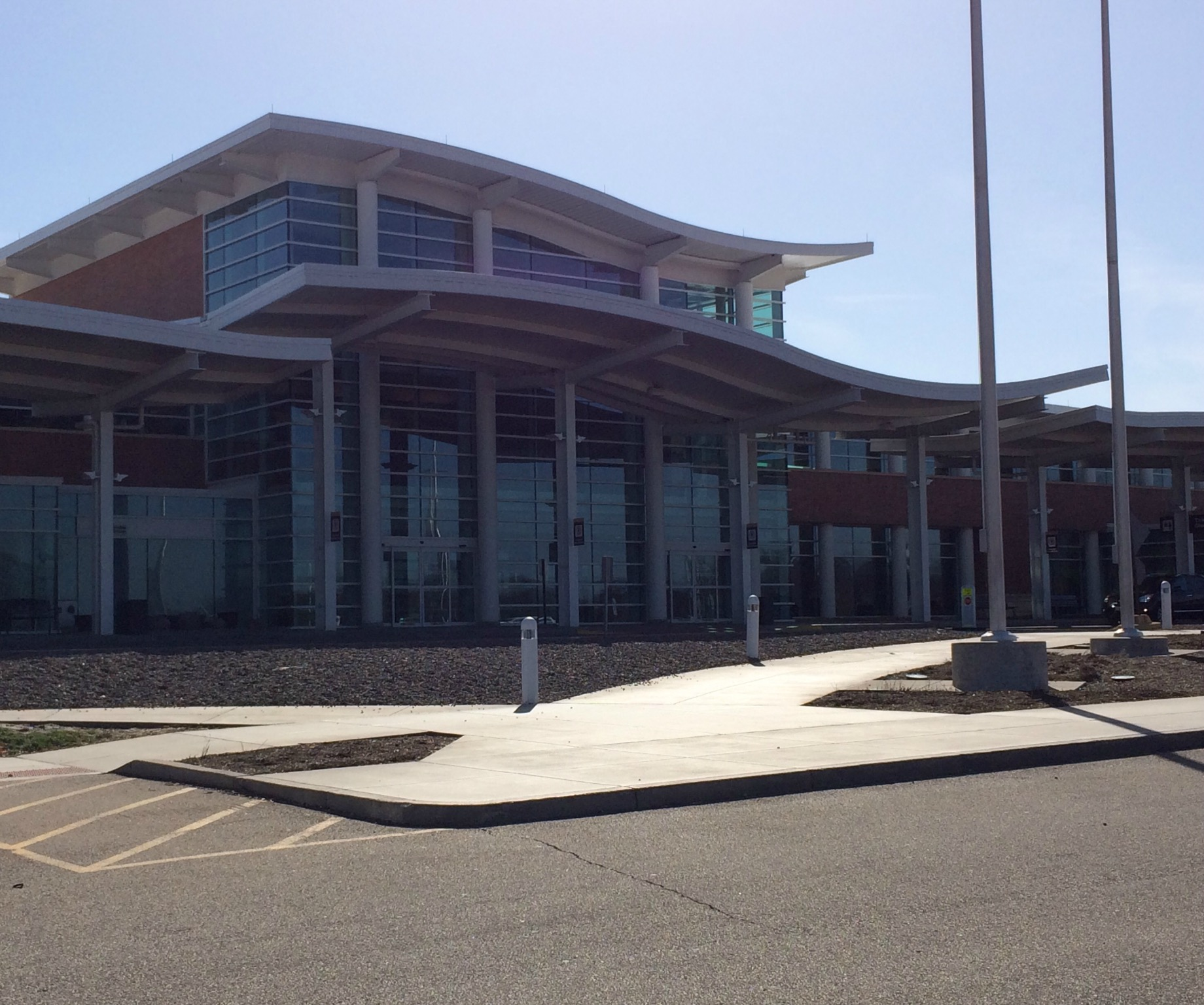
The passenger terminal at Peoria International Airport

On May 19, 1932, the citizens of Peoria voted to have an airport. On 195 acres (0.8 km^{2}), American Airways (now American Airlines) and Chicago and Southern Airlines brought in airmail and passenger services on four shale-surfaced runways. The land was purchased by 261 Peoria businessmen who formed the Peoria Airport, Inc. It was turned over to the Peoria Park District in 1937, then to the newly formed Metropolitan Airport Authority of Peoria in 1950.

American Airlines and Chicago and Southern started flights to Peoria in 1945; C&S pulled out in 1949-50 and American left in 1962, then returned for a couple years starting in 1991. TWA served Peoria 1947 to 1960 and 1983 to 1991; Continental from 1977 to 1983; United from 1984 to 1995; Republic/Northwest 1986 to 1988; and Ozark from 1950 until it merged into TWA. Peoria's first jets were Ozark DC9s in 1966. A curious artifact of airline regulation: Peoria never had nonstop flights beyond Chicago until Ozark was allowed a nonstop to New York La Guardia in 1969.

On April 25, 2007, the Greater Peoria Airport Authority announced that a new nine-gate terminal would be built and the old building demolished. On October 10, 2008, the airport was renamed "General Wayne A. Downing Peoria International Airport" during a groundbreaking ceremony attended by Ross Perot, a friend of the late Wayne A. Downing. The new terminal, designed by Reynolds, Smith & Hills of Jacksonville, Florida and the Dewberry architecture firm of Peoria, and built by Turner Construction, opened on April 27, 2011. As of August 24, 2012, the airport was in negotiations for international flights using a temporary customs facility.

In 2016, the Ray Lahood International Arrivals Terminal was completed, with more gates, TSA services, and a US Customs Port of Entry facility.

In December 2020, Delta Air Lines pulled all its flights from Peoria.

The airport authority selected a site for a new control tower in 2012, with a design phase from 2013 to 2015 and finalized in 2017; however, funding dried up before a new tower was built. As of May 2023, the airport planned to use funds from the Bipartisan Infrastructure Bill and update design plans to incorporate FAA requirement changes since 2017.

== Facilities and aircraft ==
Peoria International Airport covers 3,800 acres at an elevation of 661 feet (201 m). It has two runways: 13/31 is 10,104 by 150 feet (3,080 x 46 m) concrete; 4/22 is 8,004 by 150 feet (2,440 x 46 m) concrete.

For the 12-month period ending August 31, 2023, the airport had 38,805 operations, an average of 106 per day: 57% general aviation, 16% military, 14% commercial, and 14% air taxi. At that time, 63 aircraft were based at this airport: 33 single-engine, 5 multi-engine airplanes, 14 military, 8 jet, 2 helicopters, and 1 ultralight.

=== Military ===
The airport is co-located with the Peoria Air National Guard Base, home to the 182d Airlift Wing (182 AW) of the Illinois Air National Guard. This Air National Guard unit is operationally-gained by the Air Mobility Command (AMC) and consists of Lockheed C-130H Hercules aircraft. The airport is also home to the Illinois Army National Guard's Army Aviation Support Facility No. 3 and 1st Battalion, 106th Aviation Regiment, currently operating the Boeing CH-47 "Chinook" helicopter.

== Airlines and destinations ==
=== Passenger ===
Airlines	Destinations	Refs
Allegiant Air	Las Vegas, Orlando/Sanford, Phoenix/Mesa, Punta Gorda (FL), St. Petersburg/Clearwater; Seasonal: Denver, Destin/Fort Walton Beach, Fort Lauderdale, Nashville, Sarasota	
American Eagle	Charlotte, Chicago–O'Hare, Dallas/Fort Worth	
United Express	Chicago–O'Hare, Denver	

=== Cargo ===
Airlines	Destinations
UPS Airlines	Chicago/Rockford, Louisville

== Statistics ==
=== Airline market share ===
Carrier shares for (March 2025 – February 2026)
Carrier	Passengers (arriving and departing)
Allegiant	350,000(43.45%)
PSA	157,000(19.50%)
SkyWest	152,000(18.91%)
Envoy Air	112,000(13.91%)
GoJet	23,230(2.88%)
Other	10,850(1.35%)

Top domestic destinations (March 2025 – February 2026)
Rank	City	Passengers	Airlines
1	Chicago–O'Hare, Illinois	105,440	American, United
2	Dallas/Fort Worth, Texas	62,460	American
3	Charlotte, North Carolina	40,040	American
4	Denver, Colorado	33,830	Allegiant, United
5	Punta Gorda/Ft. Myers, Florida	33,560	Allegiant
6	Phoenix–Mesa, Arizona	33,120	Allegiant
7	St. Petersburg/Clearwater, Florida	24,580	Allegiant
8	Orlando/Sanford, Florida	20,070	Allegiant
9	Las Vegas, Nevada	17,280	Allegiant
10	Sarasota, Florida	15,280	Allegiant

== Ground transportation ==
Public transit service to the airport is provided by the Greater Peoria Mass Transit District. Route 7 operates daily from downtown Peoria to the airport.

== Accidents and incidents ==
- On October 21, 1971, Chicago & Southern Airlines (Note: According to the Aviation Safety Network report, the airline involved in the accident was founded in 1969 and ended operations in 1971. Chicago and Southern Air Lines was a completely different airline that was founded in California in 1933 and merged in 1953 with Delta Air Lines to become Delta-C&S for two years until 1955, reverting to Delta Air Lines.) Flight 804, an ATECO Westwind II, crashed 2 miles west of PIA after striking power lines in limited visibility and low clouds, killing all 14 passengers and two crew aboard. The cause was found to be the pilot knowingly descending below the minimum descent altitude before being visual with the runway.

== See also ==
- List of airports in Illinois
