= Adjutant General of Michigan =

Military official of the National Guard

Adjutant General of Michigan of the Michigan National Guard
- Incumbent; Paul D. Rogers since January 2019
- Michigan Department of Military and Veterans Affairs
- Reports to: Governor of Michigan
- Seat: Lansing, Michigan
- Appointer: Governor of Michigan
- Term length: Four years
- Formation: May 11, 1820 (Territorial); 1844 (State)
- Website: www.michigan.gov/dmva

The Adjutant General of Michigan is the senior military official of the Michigan National Guard and serves as the principal military advisor to the Governor of Michigan. The Adjutant General also serves as the Director of the Michigan Department of Military and Veterans Affairs (DMVA). In this dual role, the official oversees the administration, training, readiness, and mobilization of the Michigan Army National Guard and the Michigan Air National Guard.

== History ==
=== Territorial period (1820–1837) ===
The office was first established by the Territorial Militia Act of May 11, 1820. This act authorized the Governor to appoint an Adjutant General to maintain muster rolls and report the status of the militia to the President of the United States.

=== Early statehood and restructuring (1838–1846) ===
Following Michigan's transition to statehood, a legislative resolution on March 22, 1838, authorized the printing of the state's militia laws. At this time, the Adjutant General was designated as a staff officer with the rank of Colonel, primarily responsible for the "adjutant general's department" and the distribution of military forms and returns.

The office underwent a significant formalization under Act No. 70 of 1844. This act required the Adjutant General to be appointed by the Governor with the advice and consent of both houses of the Legislature. The act also elevated the rank of the office to Brigadier General.

This structure was codified in the Revised Statutes of 1846, which established a fixed two-year term of office and set the annual salary at $300.

=== Civil War significance ===
During the American Civil War, the office grew in strategic importance. Adjutant General John Robertson served as a key advisor to Governor Austin Blair, coordinating the mobilization of volunteer regiments and managing the state's military quotas. Under Robertson's leadership, the department produced Michigan in the War, a comprehensive record of the state's military service.

== List of Adjutants General ==
The following is a list of individuals who have served as the Adjutant General of the Michigan Territory and the State of Michigan.

Name	Term	Notes
James May	1800–1806	Territorial
George McDougall	1806–1818	Territorial
John R. Williams	1818–1829	Territorial; first Mayor of Detroit
DeGarmo Jones	1829	Territorial
Walter L. Berry	1829–1831	Territorial
John E. Schwarz	1831–1838	First State Adjutant General
Isaac Rowland	1839–1842	
Elijah Roberts	1842–1844	
John E. Schwarz	1844–1855	Second Term
Frederick W. Curtenius	1855–1861	
John Robertson	1861–1887	Longest serving; mobilized Michigan during the American Civil War
Daniel B. Ainger	1887–1891	
Judson A. Farrar	1891–1893	
Charles Eaton	1893–1895	
William S. Green	1895–1897	Civil War veteran and Detroit banker
Edwin M. Irish	1897–1898	
Fred H. Case	1898–1901	
George H. Brown	1901–1905	
William T. McGurrin	1905–1911	
James N. Cox	1911–1912	
Roy C. Vandercook	1912–1915	
John S. Bersey	1915–1940	
Egbert M. Rosecrans	1940–1943	
LeRoy Pearson	1943–1948	
George C. Moran	1948–1959	
Ronald D. McDonald	1959–1965	
Clarence C. Schnipke	1965–1974	
John A. Johnston	1974–1983	
Vernon J. Andrews	1983–1991	
E. Gordon Stump	1991–2003	
Thomas G. Cutler	2003–2011	
Gregory J. Vadnais	2011–2019	
Paul D. Rogers	2019–Present	Incumbent
