= Paul D. Rogers =

Adjutant General of the Michigan National Guard

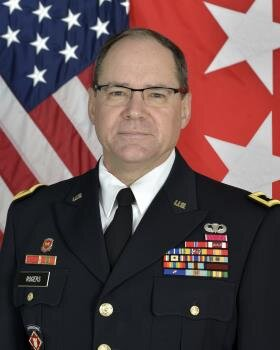
- Born: Calumet, Michigan
- Children: Three
- Military career
- Allegiance: United States
- Branch: Michigan National Guard
- Service years: 1987–present
- Rank: Major General
- Commands: Adjutant General of Michigan Military
- Awards: Legion of Merit; Bronze Star; Meritorious Service Medal (4); Army Achievement Medal

Paul D. Rogers is a major general in the Michigan Army National Guard. Since February 2019, he has been serving as the 34th Adjutant General of the Michigan Military, which includes: Michigan Army National Guard, Michigan Air National Guard and the Michigan Defense Force.

== Career ==
Rogers commissioned into the Army in 1987 through ROTC as a graduate of Michigan Technological University. As a lieutenant, Rogers was branched as an engineer officer. He started as a platoon leader in the 107th Engineer Battalion in Calumet, Michigan. Rogers stayed in the 107th Engineer Battalion until 1998 in various roles. In 2003, Rogers joined the 507th Engineer Battalion as the executive officer. In 2005, he became commander of the battalion and was in charge when they deployed to Balad, Iraq. In 2007, Rogers transferred to the Joint Force Headquarters in Lansing, Michigan. From 2009 to 2012, Rogers was the Regimental Commander of the 177th Regimental Training Institute. By late 2012, Rogers transferred to the 46th Military Police Command. He worked as assistant chief of staff, chief of staff, and finally deputy commander.

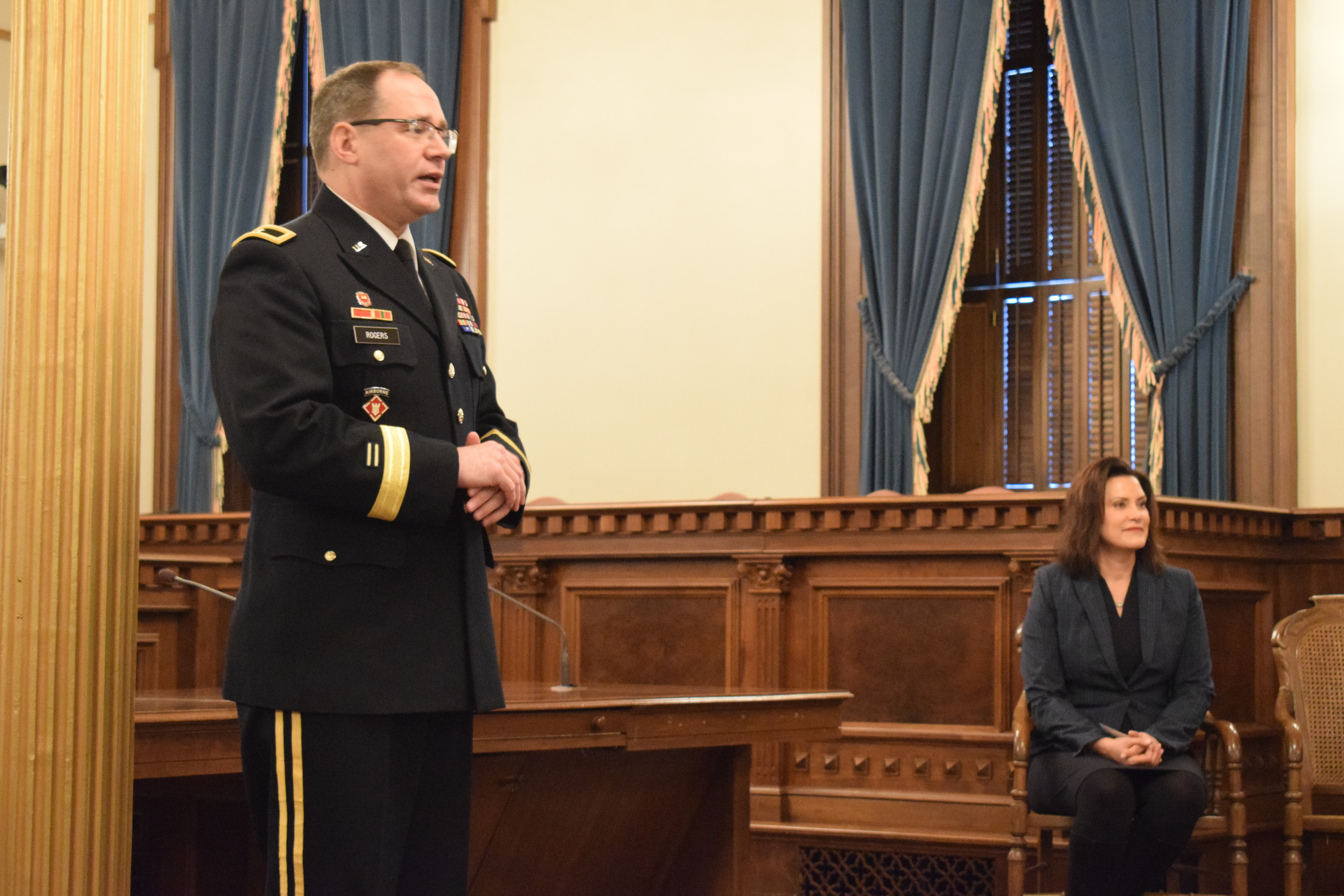
Maj. Gen. Rogers with Governor Gretchen Whitmer at the swearing in ceremony.

On January 1, 2019, Rogers was sworn in as State Adjutant General by Michigan Governor Gretchen Whitmer. Rogers replaced Maj. Gen. Gregory J. Vadnais who had served as state adjutant for over eight years. The State Adjutant General commands the Michigan Army National Guard, Michigan Air National Guard, Michigan Defense Force, and acts as the Director of the Michigan Department of Military and Veterans Affairs which includes the Michigan Veterans Affairs Agency.

Rogers was in charge of the Michigan National Guard throughout the COVID-19 pandemic. He has overseen the national guard response and relief in the state. The Michigan National Guard has been utilized at an unprecedented rate throughout the pandemic. Under the command of Rogers, there have been numerous state activations and thousands of COVID tests and vaccinations have been administered.

About 1,000 Michigan National Guard members were activated to provide security before and following the Inauguration of Joe Biden.

== Education ==
- Bachelor of Science, Mechanical Engineering, Michigan Technological University
- Master of Science, Mechanical Engineering, University of Michigan–Dearborn
- Doctor of Philosophy, Mechanical Engineering, Michigan Technological University
- Master of Strategic Studies, Strategic Studies, United States Army War College

== Personal life ==
Rogers most recently was employed as the United States Army Material Command as the director of the United States Army Tank Automotive Research, Development, and Engineering Command (TARDEC), a Tier 2 Senior Executive Service position. Rogers is divorce from his wife Sally have three children. Born and raised in Calumet, Michigan, Rogers resides in Farmington Hills.

== Awards and badges ==
Parachutist Badge

20th Engineer Brigade Combat Service Identification Badge

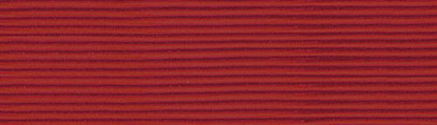
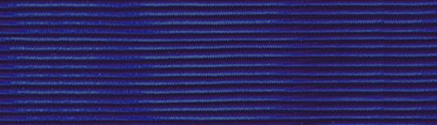
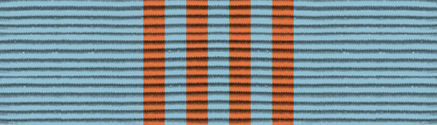
Legion of Merit
Bronze Star
Meritorious Service Medal with three oak leaf clusters
Army Achievement Medal Ribbon
Meritorious Unit Commendation
Army Superior Unit Award
Reserve Good Conduct Medal with one silver and two bronze oak leaf clusters
National Defense Service Medal
Iraq Campaign Medal with bronze star
Global War on Terrorism Service Medal
Armed Forces Reserve Medal with Silver Hour Glass and "M" Device
Army Service Ribbon
Overseas Service Ribbon
Michigan Legion of Merit
Michigan Service Medal with Gold Oak Leaf Cluster
Michigan State War on Terrorism Ribbon with "M" Device
Michigan Outside the United States Service Ribbon

== Dates of rank ==
Rogers commissioned into the Army in 1987. His current rank is Major General in the Michigan National Guard.

Insignia	Rank	Date
	Second Lieutenant	May 23, 1987
	First Lieutenant	May 26, 1990
	Captain	May 18, 1993
	Major	June 1, 1997
	Lieutenant Colonel	May 11, 2004
	Colonel	December 2, 2009
	Brigadier General	October 23, 2015
	Major General	January 10, 2019
