= John Robertson (general) =

Scottish-American military officer (1814–1887)

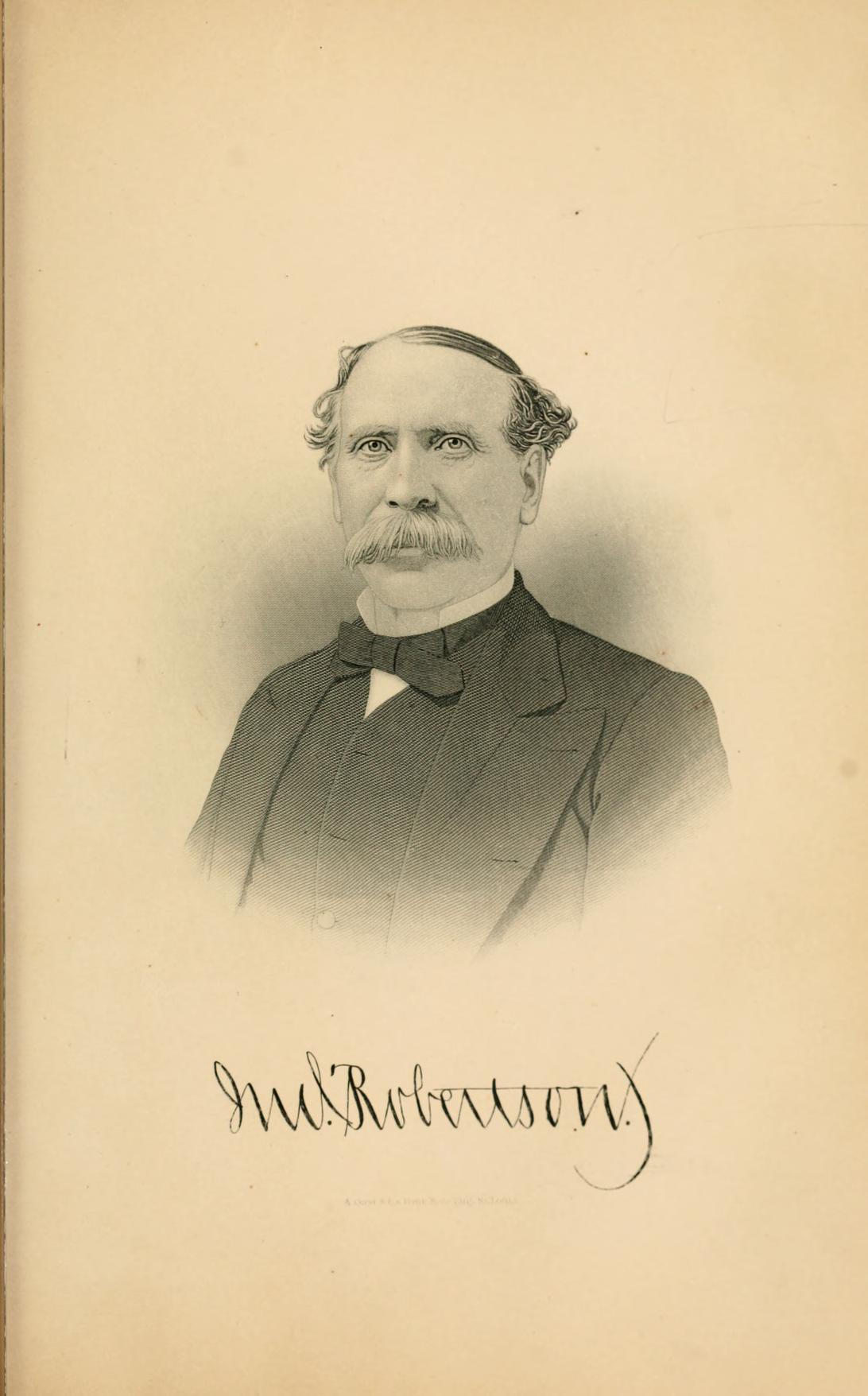
- General John Robertson
- Born: January 2, 1814; Banffshire, Scotland
- Died: March 19, 1887 (aged 73); Detroit, Michigan
- Burial place: Elmwood Cemetery
- Military career
- Allegiance: United States; Michigan
- Branch: United States Army (1833–1839); Michigan State Troops
- Rank: Brigadier General (MI); Sergeant Major (USA)
- Unit: 5th U.S. Infantry
- Commands: Adjutant General of Michigan (1861–1887)
- Conflicts: American Civil War
- Other work: Author of Michigan in the War

John Robertson (January 2, 1814 – March 19, 1887) was a Scottish-American military officer and historian who served as the Adjutant General of Michigan for twenty-six years. Appointed at the outbreak of the American Civil War, he oversaw the mobilization of over 90,000 Michigan troops for the Union Army. Robertson is frequently cited as the "father of the Michigan National Guard" and was the author of the state history Michigan in the War (1882).

== Early life and regular army service ==
Robertson was born in Banffshire, Scotland, on January 2, 1814. Seeking a military career, he immigrated to the United States in 1833 and enlisted as a private in the United States Army.

He served six years in the 5th U.S. Infantry, rising to Sergeant Major, the highest non-commissioned rank. His service included postings at Fort Howard and Fort Brady in Sault Ste. Marie. After leaving the regular army in 1839, he settled in Detroit and established himself as a commission merchant.

== Adjutant General of Michigan ==
In March 1861, Governor Austin Blair appointed Robertson as Adjutant General. He held the post through the entirety of the American Civil War, managing the recruitment and logistics for Michigan's volunteer regiments and helping Michigan consistently meet its federal troop quotas during the conflict.

Robertson remained in office for twenty-six years, serving under five successive governors. He was the primary architect of the Michigan Military Code of 1870, which transitioned the state's volunteer forces into a professionalized permanent militia known as the Michigan State Troops.

== Historical work and legacy ==
Robertson’s most enduring legacy is his work as a military historian. By order of the Michigan Legislature, he authored several definitive volumes:

- The Flags of Michigan (1877)
- The Roll of Honor
- Michigan in the War (1880; revised 1882), a comprehensive 1,000-page history of every Michigan unit that served in the Civil War.

Upon his death, the Detroit Free Press described him as "the best-known military man in the state" and highlighted his "indomitable energy" in preserving the records of Michigan's veterans.

== Death ==
Robertson died in office on March 19, 1887, at his residence in Detroit. He was buried with full military honors in Elmwood Cemetery.
