= Michigan Wing Civil Air Patrol =

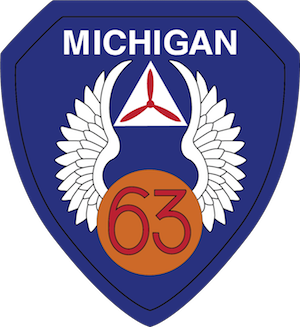
- Michigan Wing of Civil Air Patrol

Associated branches
- United States Air Force

Command staff
- Commander: Col Eric V. Scott
- Chief of Staff: Lt Col Andrew Beattie
- Senior Enlisted Leader: SMSgt Andrew Hansen

Current statistics
- Cadets: 588
- Seniors: 730
- Total Membership: 1,318
- Website: miwg.cap.gov
- Statistics as of 04 June 2025

The Michigan Wing of the Civil Air Patrol (CAP) is the top level organization of Civil Air Patrol in the state of Michigan. Michigan Wing headquarters are located in Selfridge Air National Guard Base. The Michigan Wing consists of over 1,300 cadet and adult members at over 46 locations across the state of Michigan.

== Mission ==
Civil Air Patrol performs three primary missions: providing emergency services in support of federal, state and local agencies; offering cadet programs for youth; and providing aerospace education for both CAP members and the general public.

=== Emergency services ===
Civil Air Patrol conducts search and rescue missions directed by the Air Force Rescue Coordination Center at Tyndall Air Force Base in Florida. Civil Air Patrol also assists in disaster relief efforts by providing air and ground digital imagery, key personnel transportation, and conducts a national radio communications network. Civil Air Patrol provides Air Force support, including light transport, communications support, and low-altitude route surveys, and assists in counter-drug missions. Michigan members are trained to NIMS compliance.

In May 2020, members of the Michigan Wing were a critical component in the fight against 2020 coronavirus pandemic. Members of the Michigan Wing began transporting coronavirus test kits between Lansing and more remote areas of Michigan as a part of Michigan's response to the 2020 coronavirus pandemic. Additionally, members of the Michigan Wing led the demobilization efforts of the Alternative Care Sites that were established at the TCF Center in Detroit and the Suburban Collection Showplace in Novi, as members of the Incident management team.

=== Cadet programs ===
Civil Air Patrol runs a cadet program for youth ages 12–21. Cadets receive orientation flights in small aircraft as part of their overall aerospace education, learn to lead, participate in a variety of national, state and local activities and improve their physical fitness. Michigan cadets meet once per week, 4-5 times per month on average. They also have opportunities to attend leadership encampments, career academies, and other special activities during the spring and summer.

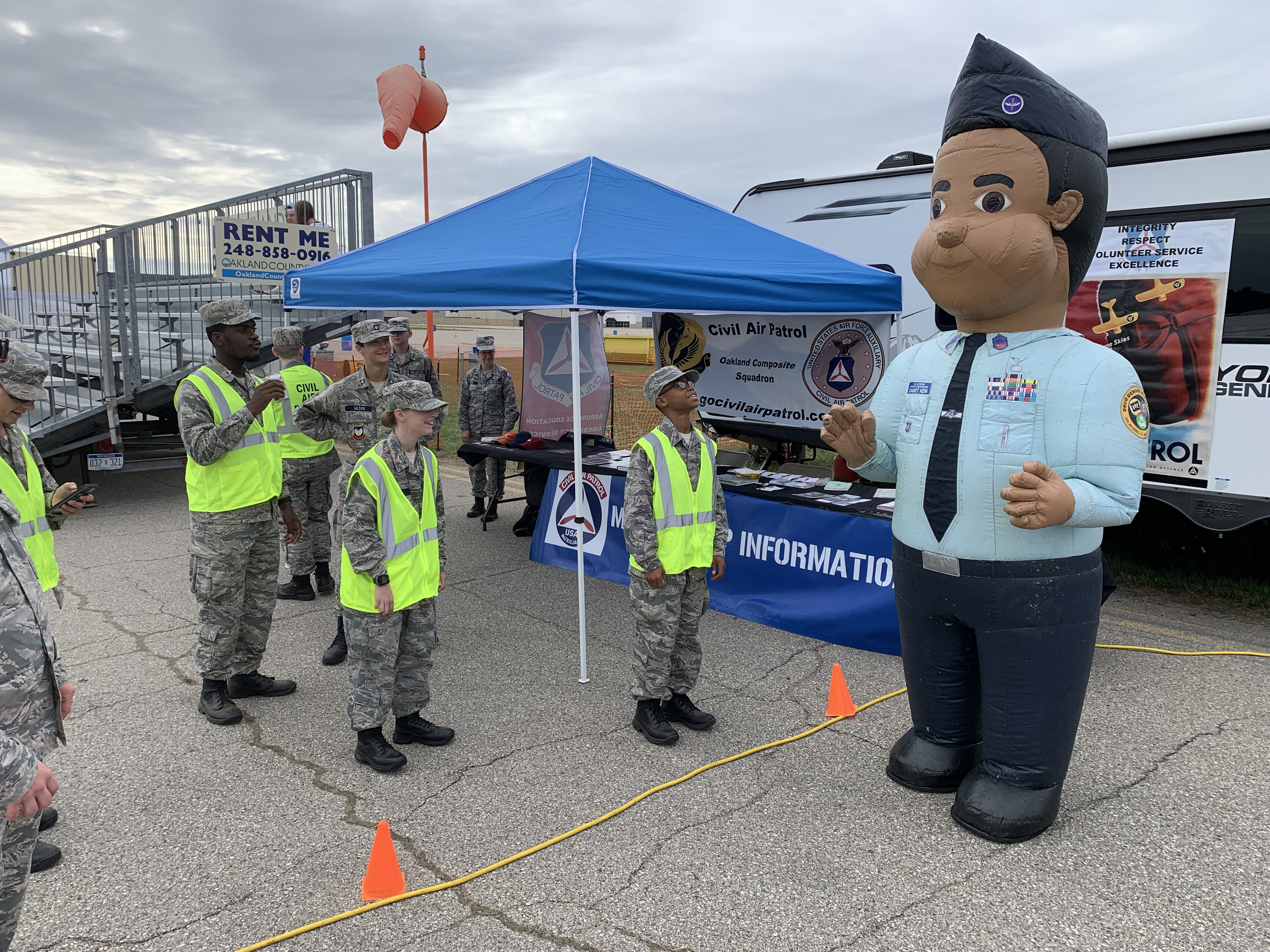
Cadet Members of the Michigan Wing and Cadet Ken at the 2022 Oakland Co. Intl. Airport Open House

=== Aerospace education ===
Civil Air Patrol offers education for its own members and the general public. Education to the general public is offered by providing workshops for educators and youth throughout the nation through schools and public aviation events. Cadets may attend Flight Academies, partake in Model Rocketry, control RC Airplanes, and fly in Orientation Flights in both a Cessna and a glider.

== Resources ==
As of 2012, the Michigan Wing has 10 Single-Engine planes and 2 gliders. As of 2025, the gliders are no longer in use due to the decision to cut funding for them by national. They have 16 Vehicles, mainly 9-10 seat vans split between the squadrons. They have 13 VHF/FM Repeaters and 175 VHF/FM stations, with 27 HF stations.

== Organization ==
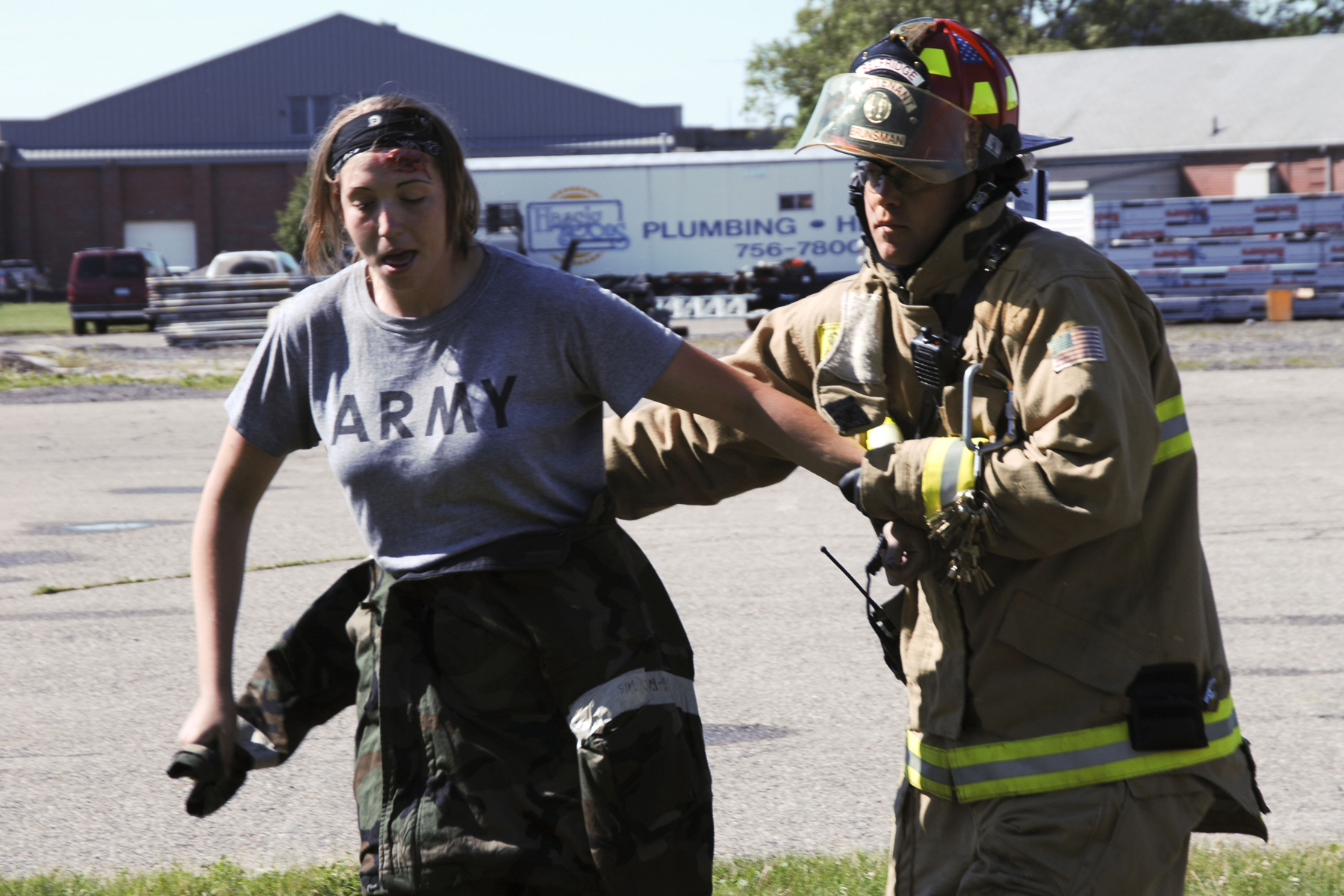
Firefighter TSgt Kurt Brunsman aids a tornado casualty portrayed by a Civil Air Patrol Cadet during a tornado response exercise held at Selfridge Air National Guard Base.

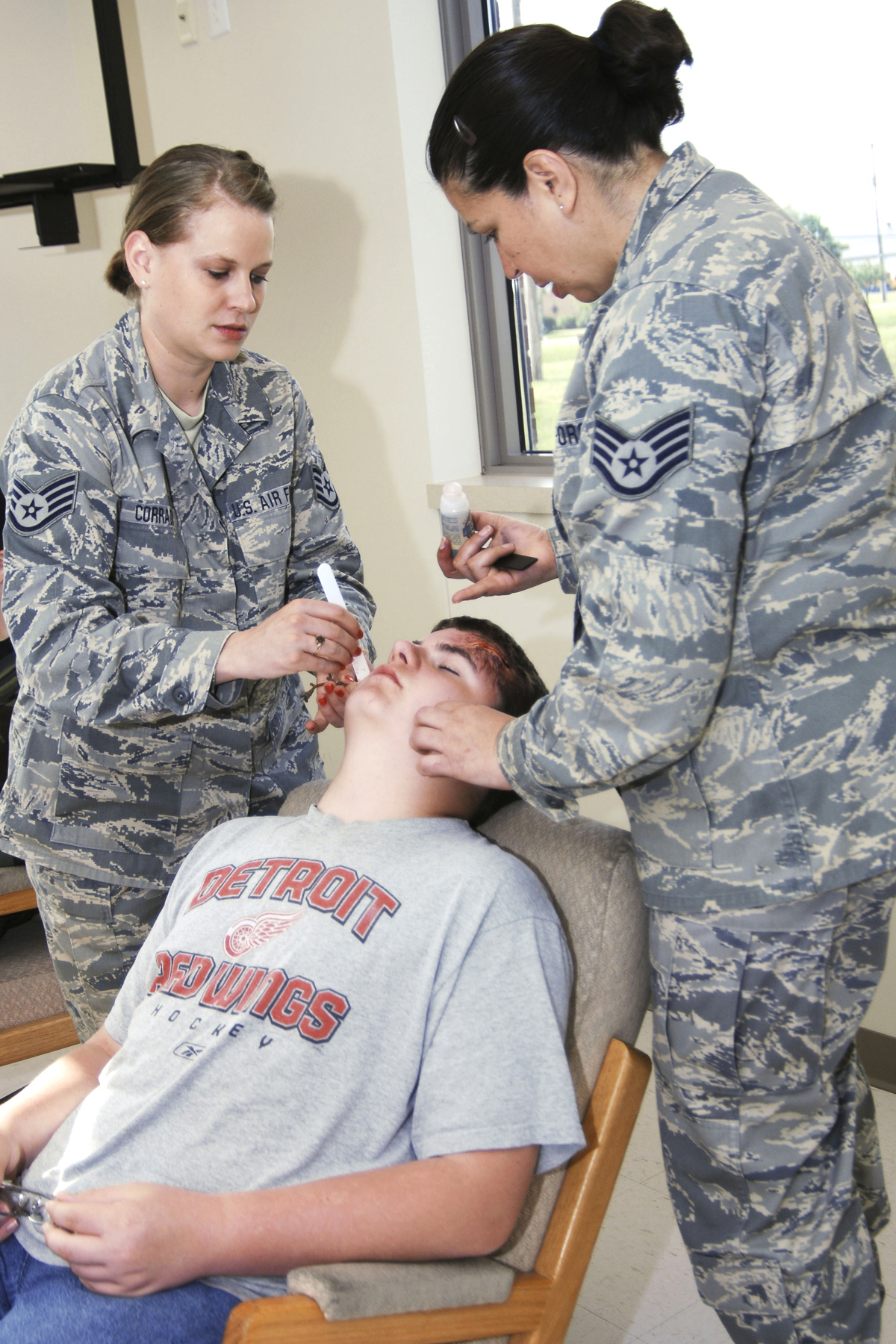
SSgt Chandra Corrado and SSgt Linda Treat apply moulage to a Michigan Wing Civil Air Patrol member; who portrayed a tornado casualty during a tornado response exercise.

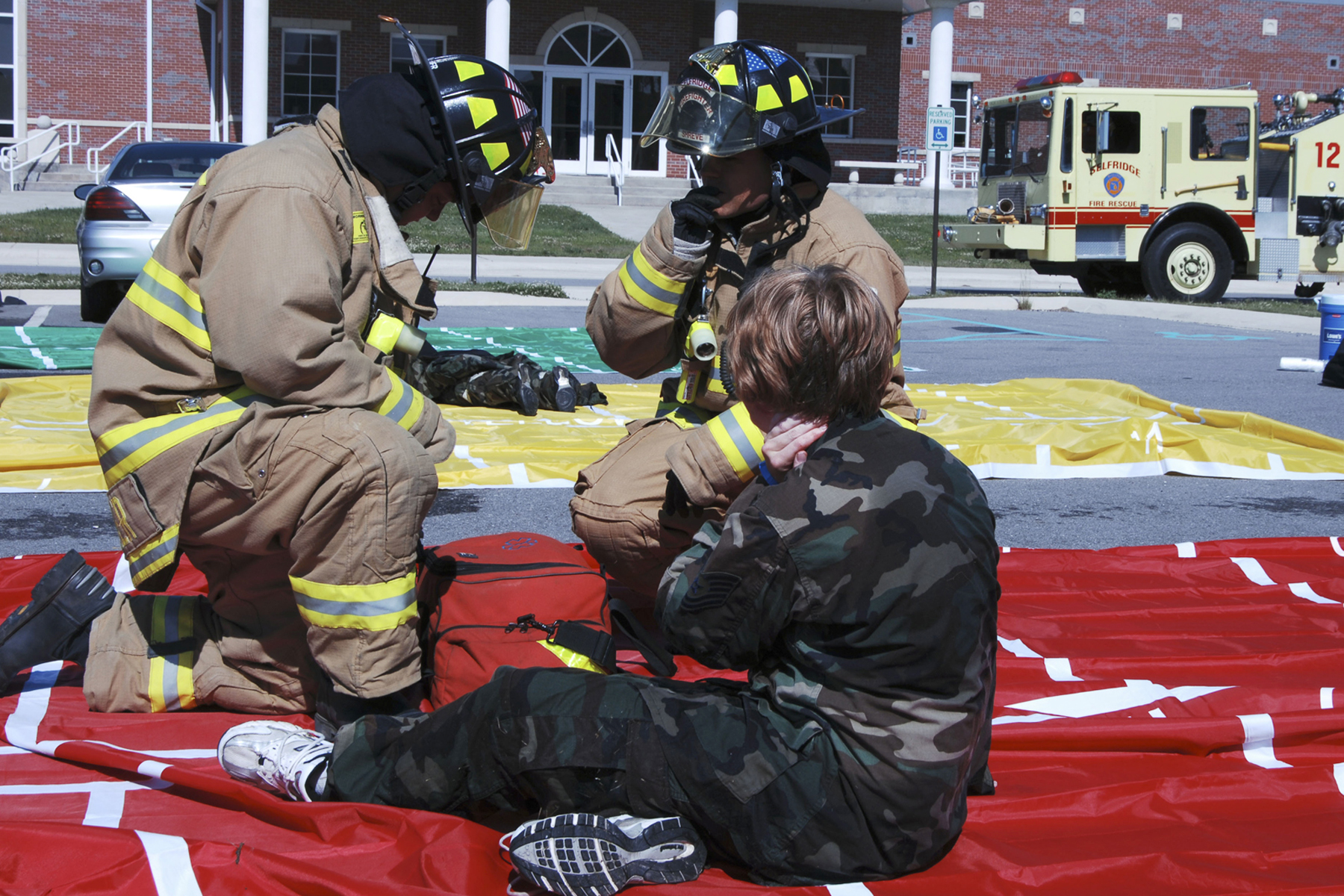
Fire Fighters Jason Collier and Anthony Shreve aid a casualty of a simulated tornado played by Civil Air Patrol member Amanda Shields during 127th Wing's Tornado Response exercise.

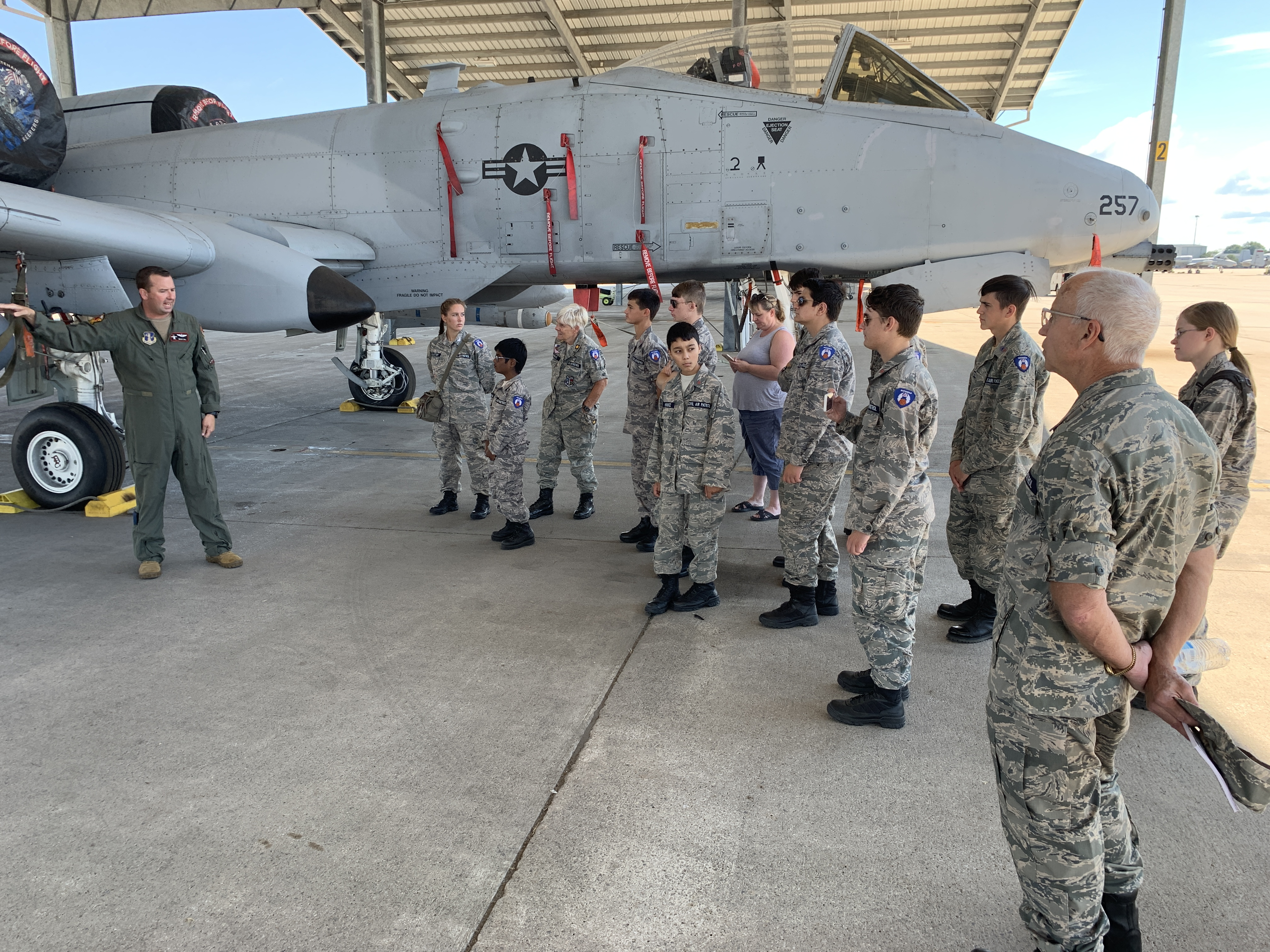
MIWG CAP members meet with members of the 127th Wing 'Red Devils' to learn about A-10 operations and training

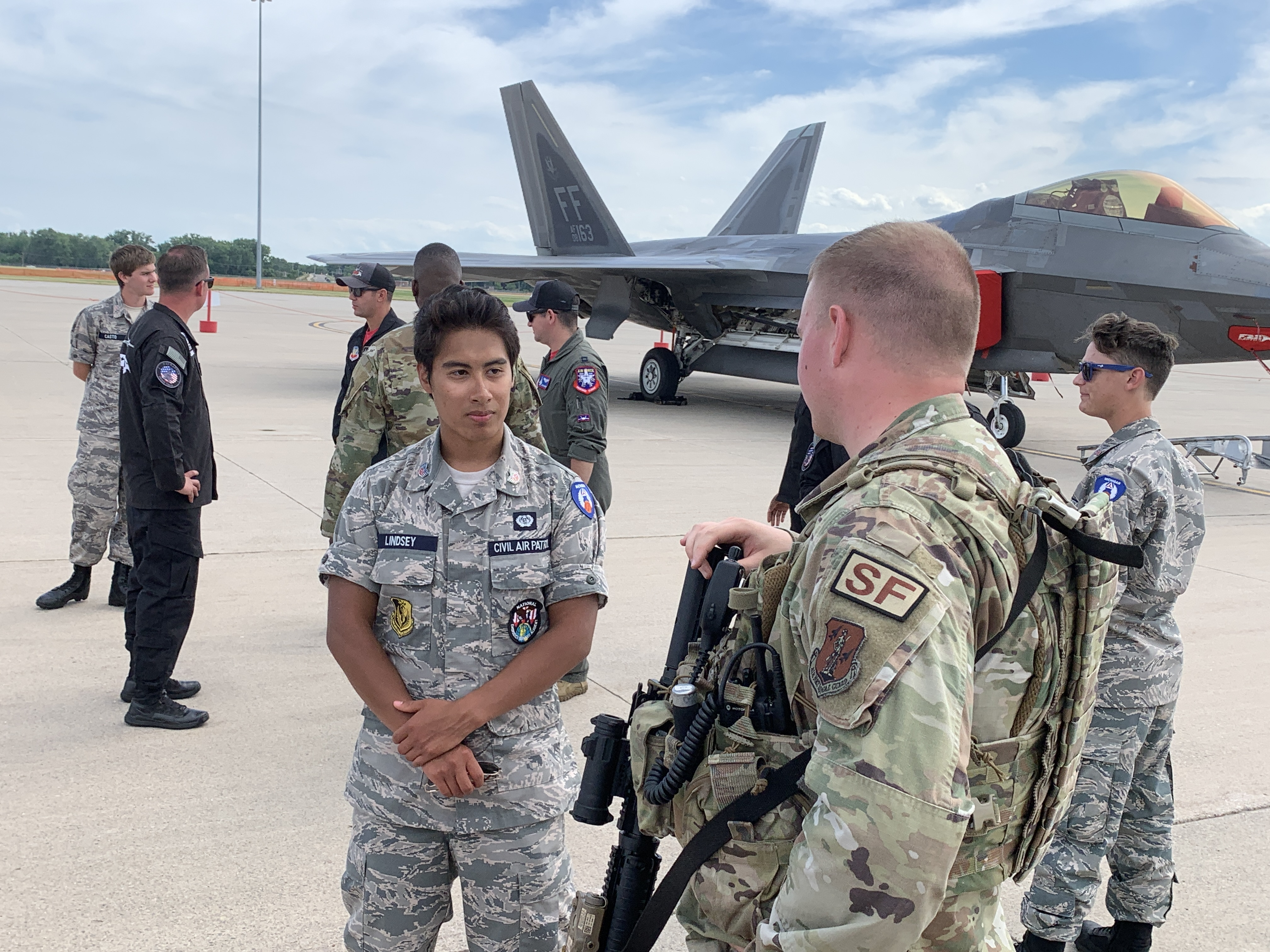
Members of the MIWG spent time with the F-22 Demo Team before an airshow

Squadrons of the Michigan Wing
Designation	Squadron Name	Location	Notes
MI-001	Michigan Wing Headquarters	Selfridge ANGB	
MI-002	Owosso Composite Squadron	Owosso	
MI-007	Livingston Composite Squadron	Howell	
MI-009	Kalamazoo Composite Squadron	Portage	Defunct as of August, 2025
MI-011	Blue Water Composite Squadron	Shelby Township	
MI-015	Wolverine Composite Flight	Benton Harbor	
MI-021	Phoenix Senior Flight	Mason	Virtual Squadron
MI-022	Copper Country Composite Squadron	Calumet	
MI-036	Sanilac Flight	Cass City	
MI-059	Adrian Composite Squadron	Adrian	
MI-063	Monroe Composite Squadron	Monroe	
MI-068	Sixgate Composite Squadron	Farmington Hills	
MI-073	South Oakland Cadet Squadron	Farmington	
MI-075	Lt Col Keehn Composite Squadron	Flint	
MI-094	Highpoint Composite Squadron	Cadillac	
MI-096	Bay de Noc Flight	Escanaba	
MI-100	The Detroit 100th Composite Squadron	Detroit	
MI-117	Van Dyke Cadet Squadron	Fraser	
MI-119	Lakeshore 119 Composite Squadron	Muskegon	
MI-131	Traverse City Composite Squadron	Traverse City	
MI-135	Al Johnson Legacy Cadet Squadron	Holland	
MI-165	Cass River Composite Squadron	Caro	
MI-176	176th Selfridge Composite Squadron	Selfridge ANGB	
MI-183	Livonia Thunderbolt Composite Squadron	Livonia	
MI-190	Grand Rapids Senior Squadron	Grand Rapids	
MI-192	Bishop Airport Senior Squadron	Flint	
MI-201	Dickinson County Composite Squadron	Kingsford	
MI-214	Jackson Composite Squadron	Jackson	
MI-222	Ionia Flight	Ionia	
MI-238	Oakland Composite Squadron	Pontiac	
MI-241	Major Joe Koch Memorial Cadet Squadron	Columbiaville	
MI-243	Thunder Bay Flight	Alpena	
MI-248	Kellogg Field Senior Squadron	Battle Creek	
MI-250	Battle Creek Flight	Battle Creek	
MI-257	Scott M. Burgess Composite Squadron	Grand Ledge	
MI-260	Willow Run Composite Squadron	Ypsilanti	
MI-261	Bay City Cadet Squadron	Bay City	
MI-265	Grand Rapids Metro Cadet Squadron	Grand Rapids	
MI-271	Mustang Cadet Squadron	New Hudson	
MI-276	Lapeer Composite Squadron	Lapeer	
MI-277	Au Sable Valley Cadet Squadron	Cadillac	
MI-394	Chippewa County Composite Flight	Sault Ste Marie	
MI-437	South Lyon Cadet Squadron	South Lyon	
MI-610	Gaylord Senior Squadron	Grayling	
MI-655	Maj Kevin A Adams Memorial Composite Squadron	Ann Arbor	
MI-999	Michigan Wing State Legislative Squadron	Lansing	

== Legal protection ==
Under the Civil Air Patrol Employment Protection Act, employers in the state of Michigan are required by law to grant a leave of absence to their employees who are members of Civil Air Patrol, when those employees are deployed to an emergency mission. An employer may not discriminate against, discipline, or discharge an employee for being a member of Civil Air Patrol or for taking a leave of absence to assist in an emergency mission.

== See also ==
- Michigan Air National Guard
- Michigan Naval Militia
- Michigan Volunteer Defense Force
