= William S. Green =

American soldier and banker (1845–1929)

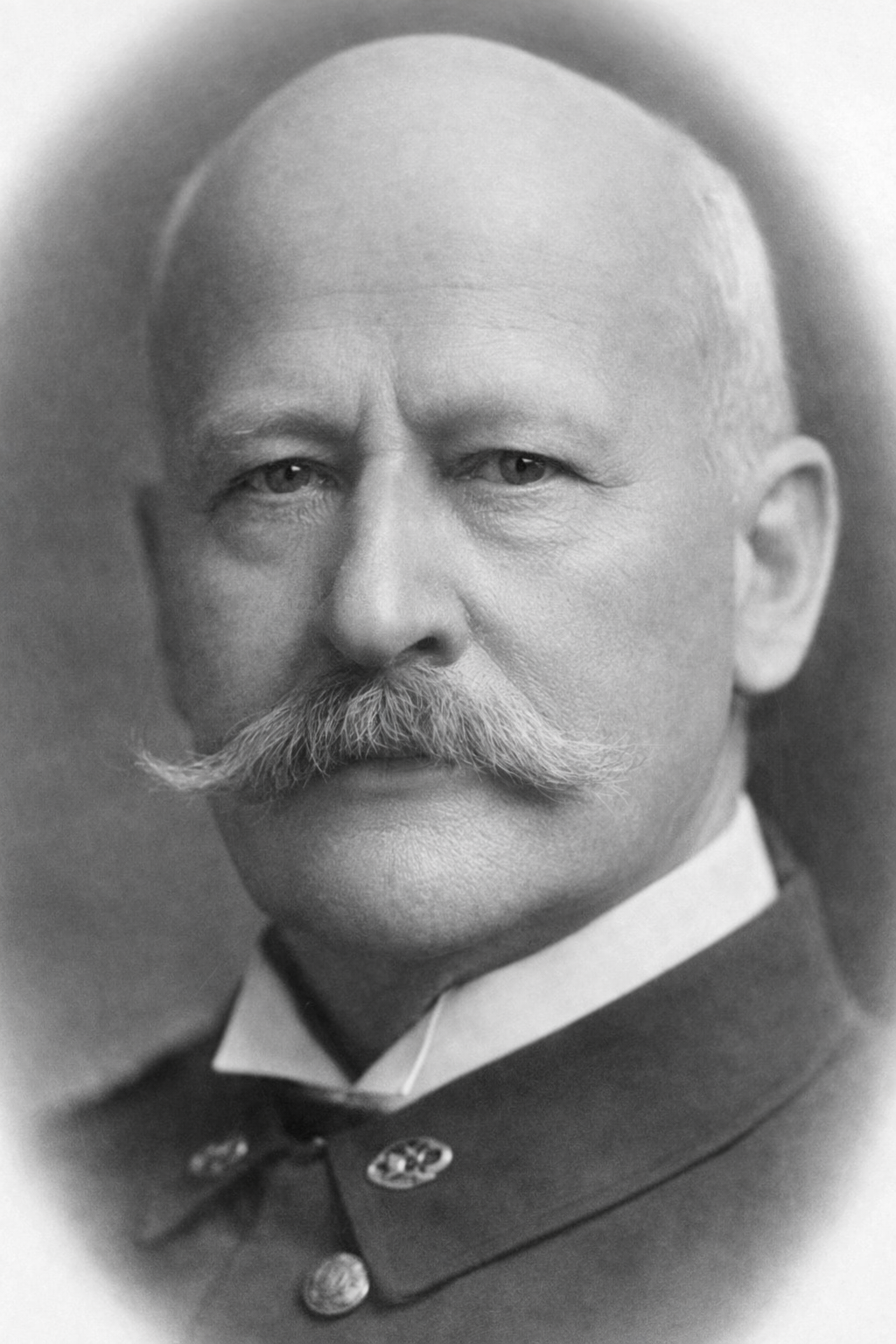
- Portrait of General William S. Green
- Born: January 11, 1846; Boston, Massachusetts
- Died: September 21, 1929 (aged 83); Detroit, Michigan
- Burial place: Elmwood Cemetery
- Military career
- Allegiance: United States (Union); Michigan
- Branch: Union Army; Michigan National Guard
- Rank: Brigadier General (MI); Private (US)
- Unit: 11th Massachusetts Light Artillery
- Commands: Adjutant General of Michigan
- Conflicts: American Civil War: Army of the Potomac
- Other work: Vice-president of Peoples Wayne County Bank; Real estate developer

William S. Green (January 11, 1846 – September 21, 1929) was an American military officer, Civil War veteran, and financier who served as the Adjutant General of Michigan from 1895 to 1897. He was a prominent figure in Detroit banking and a leader in veterans' affairs through the Grand Army of the Republic.

== Early life and Civil War service ==
Green was born in Boston, Massachusetts, on January 11, 1846. At the age of sixteen, he enlisted in the 11th Massachusetts Light Artillery. Serving with the Army of the Potomac, he participated in numerous engagements throughout the conflict. Following the war, he relocated to Detroit.

== Business career ==
Green was a significant figure in the financial development of Detroit. He was a founder of the Wayne County Savings Bank, later the Wayne County & Home Savings Bank, and now the Peoples Wayne County Bank. He remained an official of the institution until his retirement as vice-president. Additionally, he was a director of the Michigan Mutual Life Insurance Company and a partner in a realty firm with William B. Wesson.

== Military and Veterans affairs ==
Under the administration of Governor John T. Rich, Green was commissioned as a brigadier-general and given command of the state militia. In 1895, he was appointed Adjutant General of Michigan, serving as the state's senior military administrative officer.

He was the commander of Post No. 384 of the Grand Army of the Republic (G.A.R.) for many years. He was also a high-ranking member of the Masonic Detroit Commandery No. 1, serving as eminent commander in 1895.

== Death ==
Green died on September 21, 1929, following a long illness. Funeral services were held at the Masonic Temple with burial in Elmwood Cemetery. He was survived by two daughters, Mrs. Robert Shiell and Mrs. Henry T. George.
