= 246th Transportation Battalion (United States) =

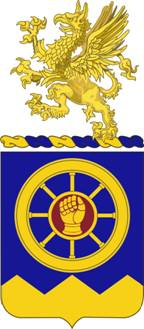
- 246th Transportation Battalion coat of arms
- Active: March 2006 to Present
- Country: United States
- Branch: Michigan Army National Guard
- Role: Transportation
- Size: Battalion
- Part of: 272nd Regional Support Group
- Garrison/HQ: Jackson, Michigan
- Nickname: Wolf Hounds
- Motto: "Born of War"
- Colors: Brick red and golden yellow
- Engagements: World War I Aisne-Marne Oise-Aisne Meuse-Argonne Alsace 1918 World War II Papua New Guinea (with arrowhead) Leyte Luzon War on Terrorism Campaigns to be determined
- Decorations: Presidential Unit Citation (Army), Streamer embroidered PAPUA French Croix de Guerre with Palm, World War I, Streamer embroidered OISE-AISNE Philippine Presidential Unit Citation, Streamer embroidered 17 OCTOBER 1944 TO 4 JULY 1945

Commanders
- Current commander: LTC Renn N. Moon

Insignia
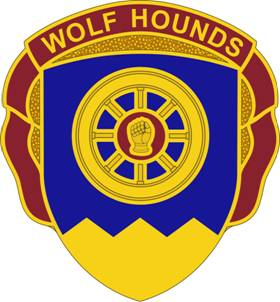
- Distinctive Unit Insignia

The 246th Transportation Battalion is a transportation battalion of the United States Army. During peacetime, the 246th is part of the 272nd Regional Support Group, a major subordinate command of the Michigan Army National Guard. Headquarters for the 246th are at the Jackson Readiness Center in Jackson, Michigan.

== Mission ==
Headquarters of the 246th Transportation Battalion provides command, control, and supervision of units engaged in motor transport and terminal operations (less seaport).

== Organization ==
- 246th Transportation Battalion (Motor), in Jackson
  - Headquarters and Headquarters Detachment, 246th Transportation Battalion, in Jackson
  - 1460th Transportation Company (Medium Truck) (PLS), in Midland
  - 1461st Transportation Company (Combat HET), in Jackson
  - 1463rd Transportation Company (Medium Truck) (Cargo), at Fort Custer Training Center

All of the battalion's subordinate companies have deployed at least once to Afghanistan or to the Iraq War. The 1461st was awarded a Meritorious Unit Citation for its actions in Operation Iraqi Freedom during the period of 19 September 2006 through 3 August 2007.

=== Unit history ===
Organized in 1905 in the Michigan National Guard at Ionia as Company A, Signal Corps Redesignated in November 1910 as Company B, Signal Corps Converted and redesignated in 1911 as Company E, 2d Infantry Redesignated 22 April 1915 as Company E, 32d Infantry Mustered into Federal service 1 July 1916 at Camp Grayling, Michigan; mustered out of Federal service 15 February 1917 at Fort Wayne, Michigan Drafted into Federal service 5 August 1917 Reorganized and redesignated 23 September 1917 as Company D, 126th Infantry, an element of the 32d Division Demobilized 24 May 1919 at Camp Custer, Michigan

Reorganized and federally recognized 6 April 1921 in the Michigan National Guard at Ionia as Company H, Infantry Redesignated 28 November 1921 as Company H, 126th Infantry, an element of the 32d Division Inducted into Federal service 15 October 1940 at Ionia (Headquarters, 32d Division redesignated 1 February 1942 as Headquarters, 32d Infantry Division) Inactivated 28 February 1946 at Kokura, Japan (126th Infantry relieved 31 May 1946 from assignment to the 32d Infantry Division and assigned to the 46th Infantry Division)

Reorganized and federally recognized 17 December 1946 at Ionia Reorganized and redesignated 15 March 1959 as the Combat Support Company, 1st Battle Group, 126th Infantry Reorganized and redesignated 15 March 1963 as Company B, 1st Battalion, 126th Infantry Relieved 1 February 1968 from assignment to the 46th Infantry Division; concurrently consolidated with part of Company A, 1st Battalion, 126th Infantry (organized and federally recognized 15 November 1965 at Ionia), and consolidated unit converted and redesignated as the Supply Platoon, 1st, 2d, and 3d Direct Support Platoons, and the Avionics Section, 1463d Transportation Company Reorganized and redesignated 1 February 1972 as Detachment 1, 1463d Transportation Company Consolidated 1 July 1972 with Detachment 1, Company A, 3d Battalion, 126th Infantry (organized and federally recognized 1 February 1972 at Wyoming), and consolidated unit designated as Detachment 1, Company A, 3d Battalion, 126th Infantry, an element of the 38th Infantry Division Converted and redesignated 1 March 1977 as Headquarters and Headquarters Company, 107th Supply and Service Battalion; concurrently relieved from assignment to the 38th Infantry Division Redesignated 13 April 1984 as Headquarters and Headquarters Detachment, 107th Supply and Service Battalion Reorganized and redesignated 1 August 1994 as Headquarters and Headquarters Detachment, 107th Support Battalion Reorganized and redesignated 1 September 1997 as Headquarters and Headquarters Detachment, 146th Support Battalion; concurrently, location changed to Bay City

Consolidated 1 September 2005 with Headquarters and Headquarters Detachment, 107th Quartermaster Battalion (organized and federally recognized 12 December 2002 at Jackson); consolidated unit designated as Headquarters and Headquarters Detachment, 107th Quartermaster Battalion, and location changed to Jackson Ordered into active Federal service 21 May 2006 at Jackson; released 16 November 2007 from active Federal service; consolidated with Headquarters and Headquarters Detachment, 746th Maintenance Battalion (see ANNEX); and consolidated unit designated as Headquarters and Headquarters Detachment, 246th Transportation Battalion

Annex Constituted 13 May 1946 in the Michigan National Guard as the 746th Ordnance Maintenance Company and assigned to the 46th Infantry Division Organized and federally recognized 12 December 1946 at Fort Custer Location changed 15 December 1952 to Battle Creek Expanded, reorganized, and redesignated 5 January 1953 as the 746th Ordnance Battalion, with headquarters at Lansing, and remained assigned to the 46th Infantry Division Redesignated 15 March 1959 as the 107th Ordnance Battalion and remained assigned to the 46th Infantry Division Redesignated 15 March 1963 as the 107th Maintenance Battalion Ordered into active Federal service 24 July 1967 at Camp Grayling, Michigan; released 2 August 1967 from active Federal service and reverted to state control Relieved 1 February 1968 from assignment to the 46th Infantry Division; battalion concurrently broken up and its elements reorganized and redesignated as follows: Headquarters and Company A as Headquarters and Company A, 107th Maintenance Battalion (Company B as the 1071st Heavy Equipment Maintenance Company; Companies C and D as the 1072d Light Maintenance Company; Company E as the 1463d Transportation Company - hereafter separate lineages) Reorganized and redesignated 1 February 1972 as Headquarters and Headquarters Company, 107th Supply and Service Battalion Reorganized and redesignated 1 March 1977 as Headquarters and Headquarters Detachment, 746th Maintenance Battalion

Home station: Jackson

=== Battalion commanders ===
- LTC Paul H. Scheidler (February 2007 to July 2008)
- LTC Andrew M. Roman (August 2008 to December 2009)
- LTC Jerome P. Hurtgen Jr. (January 2010 to July 2011)
- LTC John T. Collins III (July 2011 to June 2013)
- LTC Joseph Cognitore (June 2013 to September 2015)
- LTC Brian K. Burrell (October 2015 to May 2018)
- LTC Calvin J. Caverly (May 2018 to October 2020)
- LTC Ryan D. Davis (October 2020 to February 2023)
- LTC Renn Moon (March 2023 to Present)

=== Command sergeants major ===
- CSM Mark D. Surbrook (March 2006 to 2007)
- CSM John E. Engel
- CSM Kennth L. Holmes
- CSM David L. Folsom II (April 2013 to January 2015)
- CSM Dennis J. Neer (February 2016 to December 2018)
- CSM Andrew M. Rodriguez (January 2019 to January 2021)
- 1SG Duane I. Pike ( March 2021 to August 2021)
- CSM Jayme S. Andrews ( August 2021 to present )

== Unit insignia ==
The 246th Transportation Battalion coat of arms and distinctive unit insignia were both approved on 17 April 2008. Both consist of a blue shield with a gold wheel and gauntlet surmounting the brick red hub. The base of the shield consists of a golden yellow dancetté.

On the coat of arms, there is a crest above the shield. The crest consists of a golden and blue wreath on which stands a gold griffin. Atop the distinctive unit insignia is a brick red scroll inscribed "Wolf Hounds" in gold.

Symbolism

In heraldry, the griffin represents vigilance and readiness. For Michigan, it also harkens to French explorer René-Robert Cavelier, Sieur de La Salle whose ship, Le Griffon, was the first European vessel to sail the upper Great Lakes.

Brick red and golden yellow are the colors traditionally associated with transportation units. The wheel symbolizes the battalion's basic mission of transportation. The closed gauntlet, adapted from the 46th Infantry Division's shoulder sleeve insignia, alludes to the historical significance of the division to the units in the battalion. It also denotes the unit's vigilance to engage in any audacious task. The dancetté signifies the Lower Peninsula and the hills of southern Michigan, the home state of the battalion.
