= 107th Engineer Battalion =

- Active: 1881
- Country: United States
- Allegiance: Michigan
- Branch: United States Army
- Part of: Michigan Army National Guard
- Garrison/HQ: Ishpeming, Michigan
- Motto: "Good As Done!"
- Engagements: Spanish–American War; Pancho Villa Expedition; World War I World War II; Iraq War; War in Afghanistan

The 107th Engineer Battalion is a unit of the Michigan Army National Guard with its headquarters in Ishpeming. The unit operates in the Upper Peninsula of Michigan, and is composed of the Headquarters Company in Ishpeming, and the 1430th, 1431st, 1432nd, and 1437th Engineer Companies which are stationed across other various cities in Northern Michigan. The 507th Engineer Battalion is regarded as the "sister" unit to the 107th because it is headquartered in the lower peninsula. The 107th's motto is "Good as Done!"

== Beginning ==
The battalion traces its history to the Michigan State Troops, the predecessor organization to the Michigan National Guard. In 1881, the "Calumet Light Guard" was formed, and the unit to which the 107th Engineer Battalion traces its roots. At the time, Calumet was a prominent mining town and one of the more influential cities in Michigan. The battalion also often claims relation to Civil War volunteer units raised in the Upper Peninsula, however since none of the men from those units went on to serve in the Calumet Light Guard, the unit has no official ties to the Civil War. The 1431st Engineer Company is still stationed in Calumet, and is therefore the most direct descendant of this unit. The Calumet Light Guard was officially designated as Company B, 2nd Battalion of Infantry.

== Early national service and World War I ==
During WWI 107th engineers were part of the 32nd 'Red Arrow' Division, which was formed from the units of the Michigan and Wisconsin National Guard.

The unit was later redesignated as Company H, 3rd Infantry Regiment in 1883, and as Company D, 5th Infantry Regiment on 28 November 1891. On 25 May 1898, it was mustered into US service as Company D, 34th Michigan Volunteer Infantry and deployed to Santiago de Cuba to fight in the Spanish–American War. It returned to Michigan and was mustered out of federal service in December 1898 at Calumet, and was reorganized on 10 July 1899 as Company E, 3rd Infantry Regiment. On 1 June 1906, the unit was converted to Company A, Michigan Engineer Corps. The newly formed engineer unit, with a strength of 164 soldiers, was mustered into federal service in June 1916 to aid in border guard duty during the Pancho Villa Expedition. Several months later the unit was once again called into active service as part of the US effort in World War I; coincidentally, both the Pancho Villa Expedition and the American Expeditionary Force deployed to Europe were both led by General John J. Pershing. Part of the current motto of the battalion stems from this time period: "In World War I we smashed every line the Germans held." The unit was mustered into federal service in March 1917 and redesignated as the 1st Engineer Battalion, later being assigned to the 107th Engineer Regiment, part of the 32nd Infantry Division, commonly known as the "Red Arrow" Division and composed of units from the Michigan and Wisconsin National Guards.

While being transported to England aboard the SS Tuscania, the ship was struck by a torpedo from a German submarine, causing 200 casualties aboard the ship, however, all troops of Company A were able to safely board nearby escort destroyers. The unit's equipment was replaced prior to being deployed to France as it had been lost aboard the sunk ship. The 107th Engineers took part in the Fourth Battle of Champagne which led to the armistice with Germany 100 days later. The unit was tasked with engineering duties such as removing obstacles in the trench warfare landscape, constructing defensive lines, and bridge construction and maintenance. Following the armistice, it was tasked with rebuilding 120 km of road in war-torn regions as well as restoring public utilities in over 80 towns. The regiment was demobilized in 1919.

== Interwar period ==
The 107th Engineer Regiment was reconstituted in the National Guard in 1921, assigned to the 32nd Division, and allotted to Wisconsin and Michigan. The regimental headquarters and 1st Battalion were allotted to Wisconsin, and the 2nd Battalion was allotted to Michigan. Company A, organized on 6 December 1920 at Viroqua, Wisconsin, was the only active unit of the regiment from 1921 to 1926. In November 1926, all Wisconsin elements were withdrawn and the entire regiment was allotted to Michigan. The 1st Battalion was organized and federally recognized on 26 April 1937 at Ann Arbor. The regimental headquarters was organized and federally recognized on 29 December 1939 at Ann Arbor. The 2nd Battalion was organized and federally recognized on 21 May 1940 with headquarters at Calumet. Summer training typically was conducted at Camp Douglas, Wisconsin, for Company A between 1921 and 1926, and at Camp Grayling, Michigan for the active Michigan elements between 1937 and 1939.

== World War II ==
On 15 October 1940, the regiment was inducted into federal service and was transferred on 21 October to Camp Beauregard, Louisiana. It was subsequently transferred on 15 February 1941 to Camp Livingston, Louisiana. On 16 January 1942, the regiment (less the 2nd Battalion) was reorganized and redesignated as the 107th Engineer Combat Battalion, an element of the 32nd Infantry Division, while the 2nd Battalion was relieved from assignment to the division and redesignated as the 2nd Battalion, 131st Engineer Regiment. The 32nd Infantry Division was originally scheduled for shipment to Europe, but Japanese advances in New Guinea meant that it was hurriedly called to serve in the Pacific instead. However, the 107th Engineers had already shipped to England to prepare facilities for the division. The 114th Engineer Battalion was assigned to the 32nd to replace it, and on 1 June, the 107th Engineer Combat Battalion was inactivated in Northern Ireland and relieved from assignment to the division. The personnel were concurrently transferred to

the newly-constituted 2nd Battalion, 112th Engineers. On 19 August 1943, the 112th Engineers was broken up and the 2nd Battalion became the 254th Engineer Combat Battalion. Upon landing in Normandy, the 254th engaged in immediate engineer work. German forces created deliberate obstacles to slow the allied landing such as destroying bridges, roads, and laying mine fields. The unit was tasked with removing or fixing these obstacles to ensure the smooth flow of supplies. The unit engaged in combat during the Battle of the Bulge. On December 16, 1944, The unit was notified that the Germans had broken through allied lines and was ordered to form a defensive perimeter around Bullingen, Belgium. The battalion was split into three parts, Company A guarding the center line, B guarding the south, and C guarding the north. During the night soldiers reported troops moving on their positions, however due to poor communication it could not be made clear if these were allied troops falling back or the German troops preparing to attack the unit's position, therefore no order to fire was given. Eventually two waves of German infantry assaulted the battalion's position, each being held back. However, as dawn approached German troops launched an armored assault, utilizing their Tiger and Panzer tanks to attack Company B's position from the south. As the unit had no anti-tank weapons it was over ran by German forces.

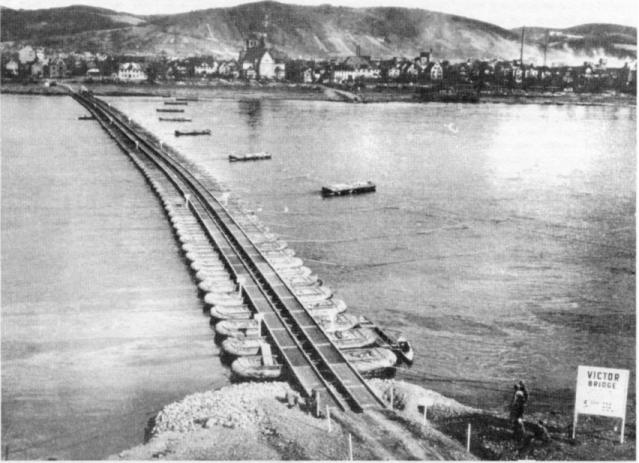
US Army's Victor Bridge over the Rhine, the longest tactical floating bridge ever constructed, built by the 107th engineers

With Company B being over ran the unit was ordered to retreat. Company C located north of Bullingen managed to fight its way out of the city in the northern direction. Due to communication problems Company A did not receive any orders, holding its position in the center of town. The battalion headquarters regrouped west of Bullingen forming a new defensive line, and was forced into arming its support personnel such as cooks and drivers, as well as any stragglers who happened to join the unit as it retreated. By noon two platoons of Company B were able to make their way from behind German lines to rejoin the battalion headquarters at its newly formed defensive line. Likewise American reinforcements from the 612th Tank Destroyer Battalion arrived providing anti-tank guns against the German armor. This halted the German armored advance, however artillery attacks continued. Company A was also still holding its position in the center of Bullingen, failing to receive the retrieve order. The unit was so far ahead of the front line they were mistaken for German troops. The company commander eventually realized the unit had reformed at a new defensive line, rejoining the battalion. Despite holding the line against German forces the cost of the battle was high for the unit, with 28 soldiers KIA and 54 MIA. For their actions during the Battle of the Bulge the unit received the Presidential Unit Citation.

The unit is perhaps most famous for building the longest tactical floating bridge in the world across the Rhine, being 1370 ft in length, which was built in the span of 14 hours. The bridge was nicknamed 'Victor Bridge' by the crossing troops The battalion was tasked with repairing the Killeda-Naumberg railroad, however the majority of the work was conducted by German POWs, with displaced Polish troops aiding in supervision. The unit was finally deployed to Pilsen, as part of Patton's Third Army's drive to liberate western Czechoslovakia. While American forces occupied western Pilsen Soviet troops took control of the east, allowing the unit's troops to become some of the first to contact Soviet soldiers during World War II. During the war the battalion as well as the commander, Lt. Colonel Jenkins, were awarded the French Croix de Guerre, 'for exceptional services rendered in operations for the liberation of France'.

After the war, the unit was organized into its present form as the 107th Engineer Battalion, with headquarters at Ishpeming. Owing to tradition, the company stationed in Calumet was designated Company A, with Company B and Company C being stationed in Gladstone and Ironwood, respectively.

== Cold War ==
The 107th Engineers was activated for dtate emergencies only during the Cold War, such as the 1967 Detroit Riots, the 1976 Great Seney Fire, and several emergencies relating to the cold weather common in Northern Michigan. Beside deploying for state emergencies, the unit took part in several building projects across Michigan, such as constructing the 107th Engineers Memorial Highway near Silver City and constructing a hanging bridge at Camp Grayling. The Michigan National Guard also formed a partnership with Latvia, with soldiers training jointly overseas and in Michigan; the 107th Engineer Battalion has been a large participant in the program.

== War on Terror and present day ==
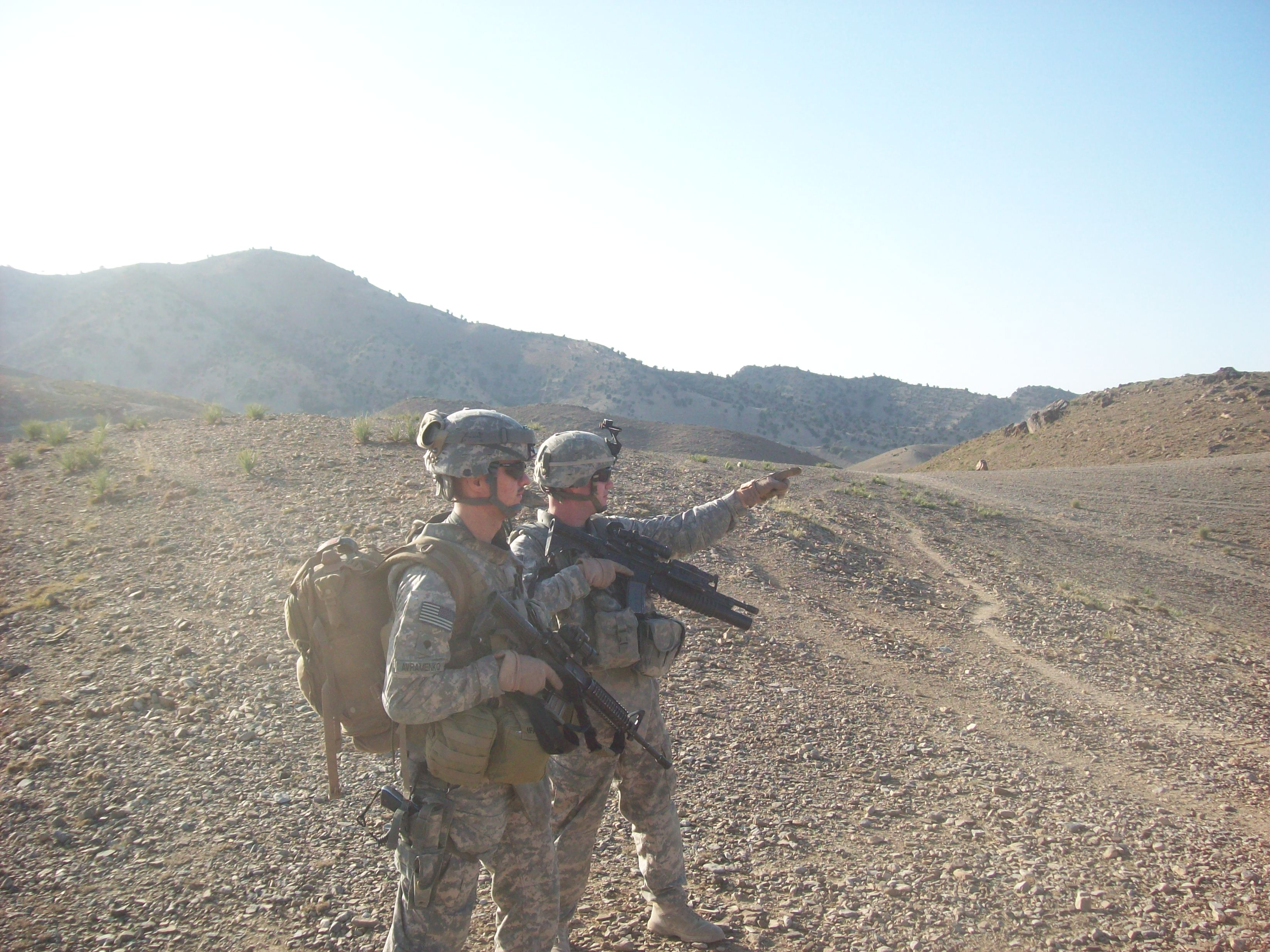
Specialist Avramenko and Sergeant Rose of Alpha Company, 107th Engineer Battalion, deployed as part of the 168th Engineer Brigade, scan for possible IED trigger points while conducting a dismounted patrol near Yakubi, Afghanistan, circa 2009.

After not being mustered into federal service for over half a century, soldiers of the 107th Engineer Battalion were once again activated in 2004 as part of the War in Iraq. The battalion was reorganized, with each company given its own table of organization and equipment and made able to deploy independently of the battalion headquarters. Companies with separate tables of organization are assigned numbers, not letters; thus, Company A was redesigned as the 1431st Engineer Company, However, for historical reasons, many soldiers continue to refer to their units by their previously assigned phonetic names, i.e. the 1431st Engineer Company is sometimes referred to as Alpha Company.

Following the deployment of the 1437th in support of the initial invasion force in 2003, the 1431st and 1430th Engineer Companies went to Iraq in 2004, the battalion headquarters deployed in 2007, and the 1437th deployed elements to Iraq in 2009. The battalion then rotated deployments into Afghanistan as the Iraq War came to an end. The 1431st Engineer Company was reclassified as a combat engineer (Sapper) company and was activated to deploy to Afghanistan in November 2008 to conduct route clearance patrols. The unit was under the command of the 168th Engineer Brigade while deployed, which itself was under the command of the 101st Airborne Division, in February 2009, the 4th Brigade Combat Team (Airborne), 25th Infantry Division, relieved the 101st, placing all units in the region under its command. Many of the Iraq veterans from the unit's first deployment returned for the next deployment. The unit was stationed at FOB Salerno near Khost Afghanistan with one detachment stationed in Paktika Province. This location in Eastern Afghanistan near the Pakistani border proved to be a challenge as the unit had to clear the notorious Khost-Gardez Pass as a routine part of its operation. This resulted in regular ambushes and firefights, moreover both FOB Salerno and Orgun-E were regularly shelled by insurgent mortar and rocket fire, many of the returning soldiers of the 1431st engineer company were injured while in combat. Several soldiers of the 1431st Engineer company had to be evacuated out of Afghanistan due to severity of their injuries during the deployment. Some of the experiences of the unit were documented in the PBS film Where Soldiers Come From, which was made by a reporter embedded with the unit and received and Emmy Award for Outstanding Continuing Coverage of a News Story. Although the unit engaged in heavy combat while deployed and many of the soldiers suffered serious injuries the unit did not lose any men. As a tribute to this all combat medics of the unit, specialists Alaniz, Avramenko, Oosterbaan, and Zelinski, were awarded the Combat Medic Badge for their service in the conflict. Through the deployment the unit also engaged in missions outside of route clearance such as collecting biometric data on the local population and guarding detainees. As route clearance units were not part of ISAF forces at the time the unit's rules of engagement allowed for the 2 day detention of any suspicious personnel.

The 1430th Engineer Company, vertical construction, was deployed to Afghanistan in 2010 and took part in large construction projects around the country, being deployed to different bases to improve infrastructure in the area.

The 1432nd Engineer Company converted to a combat engineers in 2012 and deployed to Afghanistan together with the 1433rd Engineer Company of the 507th Engineer Battalion to conduct route clearance missions. Due to being a new combat engineer unit many of the veterans of the 1431st engineer company deployed with the unit. In 2012 Sergeant Kyle McClain of the 1433rd Engineer Company was killed near Salim Aka, Afghanistan by an IED while conducting a route clearance patrol. Several other soldiers were severely injured and were evacuated out of the Afghanistan, this was the first loss of life for the 107th Engineer Battalion during the war on terror.

With a renewed focus on conventional warfare following the 2014 Russian military intervention in Ukraine the unit has been involved in a number of multinational exercises. In 2014 soldiers of the 107th Engineer Battalion deployed to Latvia as part of US Army Europe's Operation Atlantic Resolve. The soldiers assisted in site demolition, site preparation, as well as explosives placement. In September 2014 the unit participated in Operation Silver Arrow, the Latvian led exercise focused on core engineering principles such as route clearance, minefield breaching, obstacle clearance, and demolition. The training also allowed the battalion headquarters to plan out engineering missions in a multinational environment. In May 2015 the 1431st company deployed to Germany as part of a 4700 troop training mission dubbed Combined Resolve IV. The exercise focused on training troops to better function in a multinational and integrated environment so as to be better able to operate with allied forces in Europe. The 1431st Company, 107th Engineer Battalion and the 1436th Company, 507th Engineer Battalion, deployed to Latvia in August 2016 as part of the Strong Guard 2016 exercises. The exercise focused on improving interoperability between international forces, bringing together engineer, military police, and marine infantry assets from different nations to work toward a common goal. Captain Christopher Graham, operations officer for the 107th Engineer Battalion stated the exercise had "improved cooperation, relations, and interoperability between our countries."

In July 2016 soldiers of the 107th Engineer Battalion were activated to respond to an emergency declaration by Michigan governor Rick Snyder. The unit was tasked with assisting road crews with repairing damage done by a storm which washed out several roads.

== Training ==
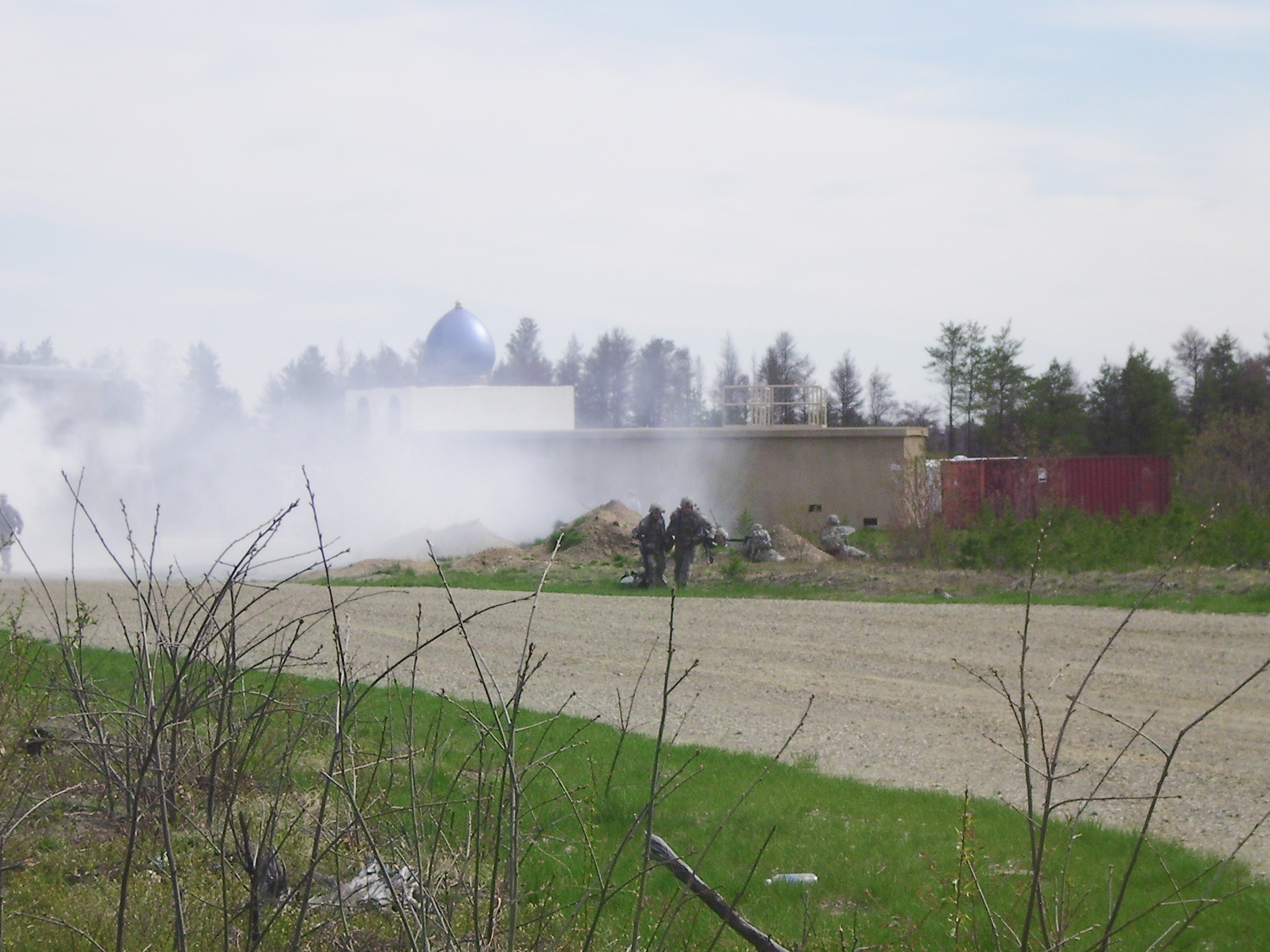
Medics of the 1431st Company, 107th En Bn simulating combat casualty extraction during training.

Like many National Guard units the Battalion's companies are highly autonomous, being stationed at different locations, having their own training schedules, and having their own specialties, sapper, vertical, or horizontal construction. The unit usually conducts training at Camp Grayling Michigan, Fort McCoy Wisconsin, or Camp Ripley Minnesota, with each company possibly attending a different training site and training at different times. The combat engineer units often train closely with EOD squads. Moreover, the companies have deployed independently in recent years and not as a whole battalion; however, often soldiers are command directed to another deploying company in order to strengthen its numbers. Moreover, soldiers are often sent on individual training, engineers of the unit are often required to go to EOCA training and may be selected to attend the Sapper Leadership Course to earn a Sapper Tab while medics are required to attend a yearly refresher course to keep their knowledge current. The headquarters company also has a large support staff of mechanics, medics, cooks, and clerks that assists the companies.

Being located in the Upper Peninsula of Michigan the medics of the unit also have the responsibility of conducting yearly vaccinations and exams as medical units are not available for the job. Due to its remote location the unit often lacks certain specialties as few people want to transfer to the region, for example the 1431st Engineer Company lacked a senior medic for 3 years after their 2009 deployment and the E6 position had to be filled by an E4 veteran from the unit's Afghanistan deployment until a senior NCO could be found. Likewise the Battalion headquarters functioned without a Medical Officer or a CBRN Specialist for several years.

== Organization ==
- 107th Engineer Battalion, in Ishpeming
  - Headquarters and Headquarters Company, 107th Engineer Battalion, in Ishpeming
  - Forward Support Company, 107th Engineer Battalion, in Marquette
  - 1430th Engineer Company (Vertical Construction Company), in Traverse City
  - 1431st Engineer Company (Sapper), in Calumet
    - Detachment 1, 1431st Engineer Company (Sapper), in Kingsford
  - 1432nd Engineer Company (Engineer Support Company), in Kingsford
    - Detachment 1, 1432nd Engineer Company (Engineer Support Company), in Gladstone
  - 1437th Engineer Company (Multirole Bridge), in Sault Ste. Marie
    - Detachment 1, 1437th Engineer Company (Multirole Bridge), in Marquette

== Equipment ==
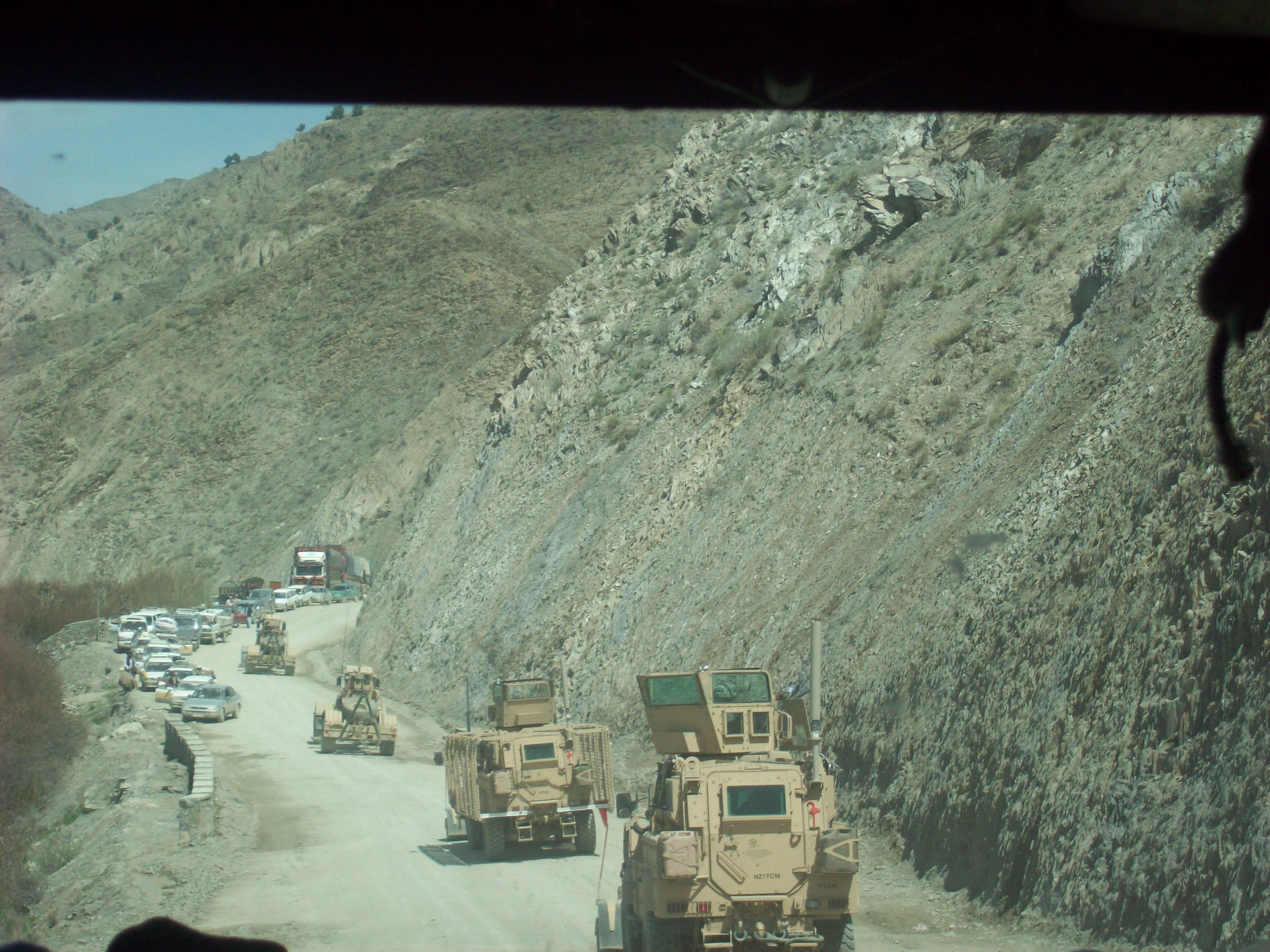
1431st Sapper Company of the 107th En Bn conducting a route clearance patrol in the Khost-Gardez Pass as part of the War in Afghanistan, note the Chubby mine detector vehicles leading the convoy, which are typically unique to sapper units

Combat arms companies such as the 1431st and 1432nd Sapper companies are assigned heavier and newer weapons. These units carry M4 carbines as their main weapon while other companies rely on the M16A2. These units also have M249 SAW assigned gunners in each fire team, these units also have a designated sharp shooter in each fire team. Moreover, the combat arms units of the battalion have access to the MK19, M240, and M2 crew served weapons systems as well as demolition equipment such as C4 and TNT charges and demolition cord. The unit possess various vehicles as listed below, some of them may be in storage while others may only have been used during deployments therefore the unit may not have access to all these vehicle types at one given time.

- Soft skin M998 HMMWV
- M1151 HMMWV
- M1152 HMMWV
- M1114 HMMWV
- FMTV
- M35 2½-ton cargo truck
- HEMTT
- Husky/Meerkat VMMD
- Buffalo (mine protected vehicle)
- RG31/RG 33 MMPV
- M113 APC (in storage).

== Engagements ==
- Spanish–American War
- Pancho Villa Expedition
- World War I
- World War II
- Iraq War
- War in Afghanistan (2001–present)

== See also ==
- Michigan Army National Guard
- Combat Engineers
- Where Soldiers Come From
