= Michigan Army National Guard =

Component of the US Army and military of the U.S. state of Michigan

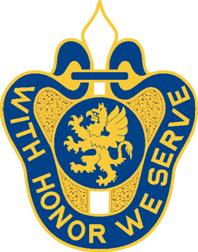
- Headquarters, Michigan Army National Guard Distinctive Unit Insignia
- Active: 1862 as state militia
- Country: United States
- Allegiance: United States; Michigan
- Branch: United States Army; United States Army National GuardArmy National Guard
- Part of: Michigan National Guard; Michigan Department of Military and Veterans Affairs
- Garrison/HQ: Lansing, MI

Commanders
- Adjutant General: Major General Paul D. Rogers

Insignia
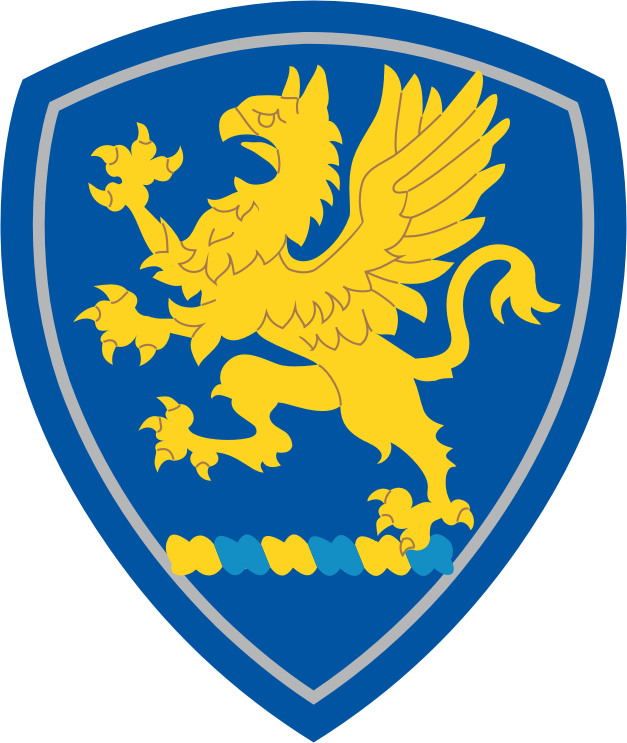
- Shoulder sleeve insignia

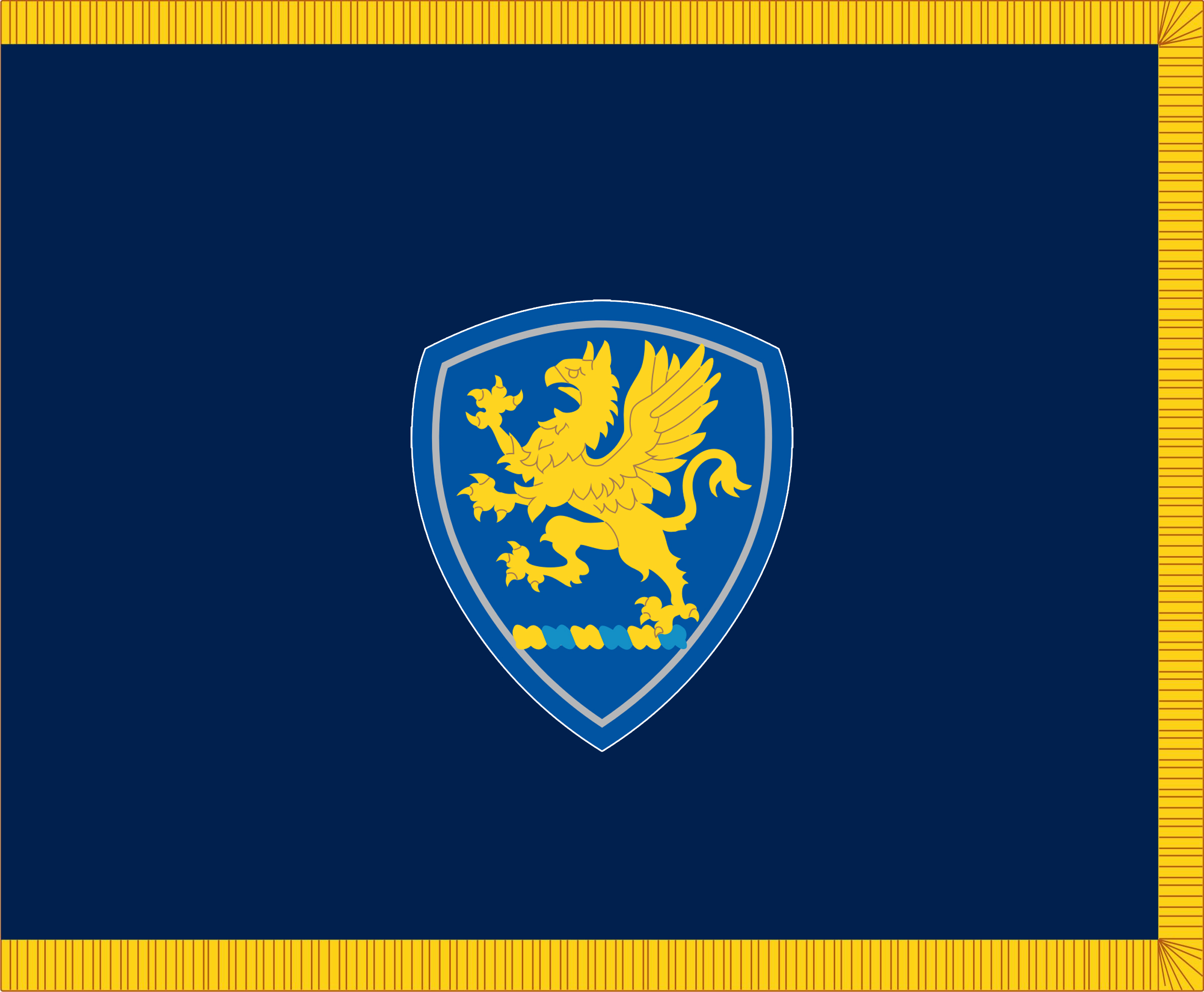
- Michigan ARNG Headquarters Flag

- Michigan ARNG Crest

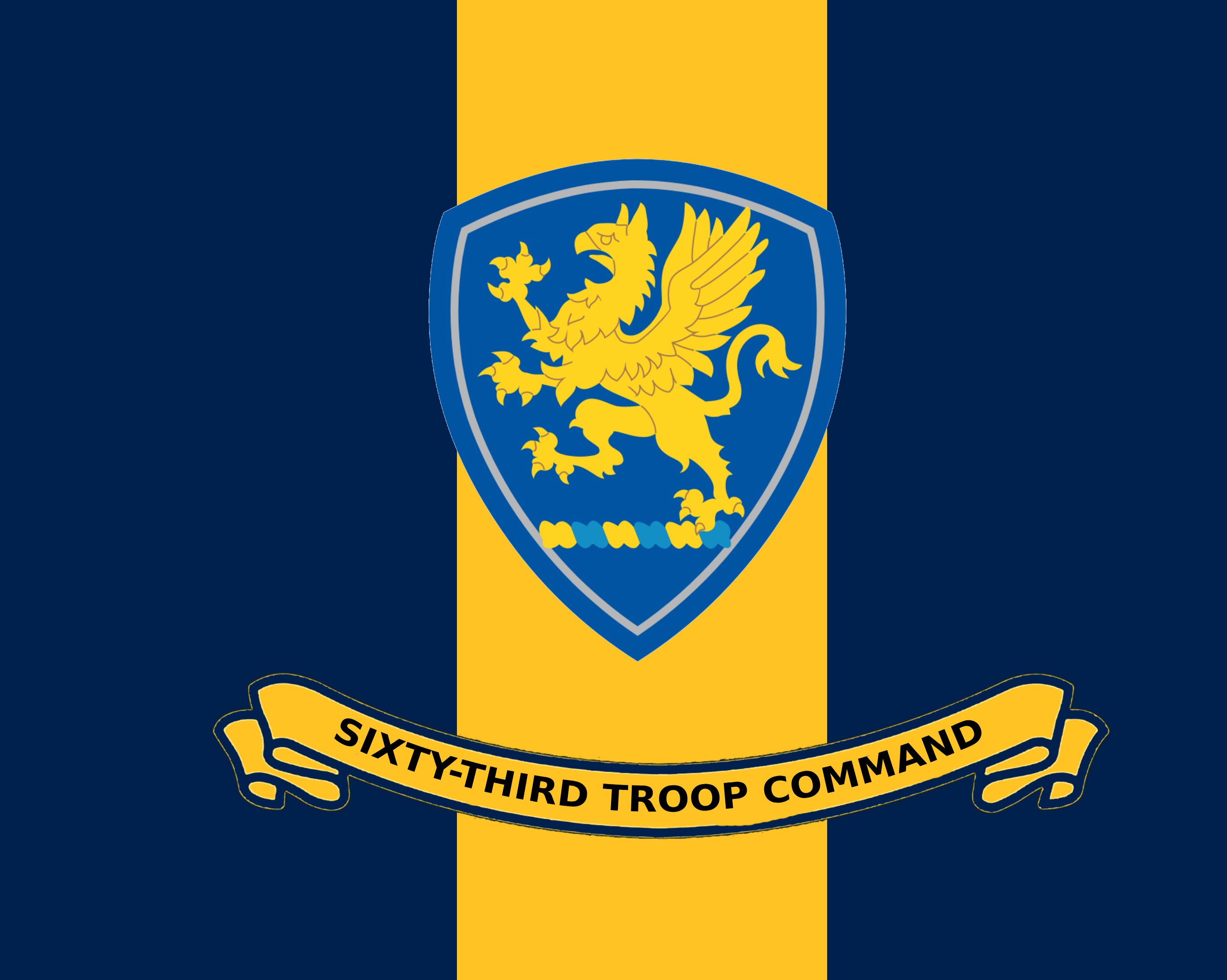
- Michigan ARNG 63rd Troop Command Flag

The Michigan Army National Guard is the Army component of the Michigan National Guard and a reserve component of the United States Army.

During the Cold War, the 156th Signal Battalion was federalized on 1 October 1962 at its home stations in response to the Cuban Missile Crisis. This marked the Michigan National Guard's last call to federal duty for service outside the state for almost 30 years.

In February 2002, the 46th Engineer Group of the Michigan Army National Guard was reorganized and redesignated as the Engineer Brigade, 38th Infantry Division. Prior to the reorganization, the 46th Engineer Group consisted of a Group Headquarters and two battalions; the 107th Engineer Battalion and the 507th Engineer Battalion.

Elements of the 107th Engineer Battalion and the 507th Engineer Battalion served with the 20th Engineer Brigade in Iraq from November 2004 to October 2005. These units also continued to serve in the War in Afghanistan, contributing combat engineer companies capable of route clearance patrols. In 2009 several soldiers of the 1431st Engineer Company were severely injured while in combat in east Afghanistan near the Khost-Gardez Pass. In 2012 a soldier of the 507th Engineer Battalion died in combat and several other were injured while conducting a route clearance patrol.

== Organization ==
As of February 2026 the Michigan Army National Guard consists of the following units:

- Joint Force Headquarters-Michigan, Army Element, in Lansing
  - Headquarters and Headquarters Company, Joint Force Headquarters-Michigan, Army Element, in Lansing
  - Michigan Recruiting & Retention Battalion, in Lansing
  - Michigan Medical Detachment, in Detroit
  - 51st Civil Support Team (WMD), at Fort Custer Training Center
  - Detachment 1, Cyber Protection Team 172, in Lansing
  - Detachment 1, 505th Judge Advocate General, in Lansing
  - 1146th Judge Advocate General Trial Defense Team, in Lansing
  - Fort Custer Training Center, in Augusta
  - Camp Grayling Maneuver Training Center, in Grayling
    - Headquarters and Headquarters Detachment, at Camp Grayling
    - 631st Troop Command Detachment, at Camp Grayling
  - 1500th Quartermaster Company (Field Feeding), at Fort Custer Training Center
    - Detachment 1, 1500th Quartermaster Company (Field Feeding), at Camp Grayling
  - Detachment 4, Company B, 2nd Battalion (Fixed Wing), 245th Aviation Regiment (Detachment 15, Operational Support Airlift Activity), at Capital Region International Airport (C-12 Huron)
  - Army Aviation Support Facility #1, at Abrams Airport
  - Army Aviation Support Facility #2, at Selfridge Air National Guard Base
  - Combined Support Maintenance Shop #1, in Lansing
  - Maneuver Area Training Equipment Site #1, at Camp Grayling
  - 46th Military Police Command, in Lansing
    - Headquarters and Headquarters Company, in Lansing
  - 63rd Troop Command, in Belmont
    - Headquarters and Headquarters Company, 63rd Troop Command, in Belmont
    - 126th Theater Public Affairs Support Element, in Jackson
    - 126th Army Band, in Belmont
    - Company D (Military Intelligence), 837th Brigade Engineer Battalion, in Lansing (part of 37th Infantry Brigade Combat Team)
    - 1st Battalion, 125th Infantry Regiment, in Saginaw (part of 37th Infantry Brigade Combat Team)
      - Headquarters and Headquarters Company, 1st Battalion, 125th Infantry Regiment, in Saginaw
        - Detachment 3, Headquarters and Headquarters Battery, 1st Battalion, 134th Field Artillery Regiment, in Saginaw
      - Company A, 1st Battalion, 125th Infantry Regiment, in Detroit
      - Company B, 1st Battalion, 125th Infantry Regiment, in Saginaw
      - Company C, 1st Battalion, 125th Infantry Regiment, in Wyoming
      - Company D (Weapons), 1st Battalion, 125th Infantry Regiment, in Big Rapids
      - Company H (Forward Support), 237th Brigade Support Battalion, in Bay City
    - 3rd Battalion, 126th Infantry Regiment, in Wyoming (part of 32nd Infantry Brigade Combat Team)
      - Headquarters and Headquarters Company, 3rd Battalion, 126th Infantry Regiment, in Wyoming
        - Detachment 2, Headquarters and Headquarters Battery, 1st Battalion, 120th Field Artillery Regiment, in Wyoming
      - Company A, 3rd Battalion, 126th Infantry Regiment, in Detroit
      - Company B, 3rd Battalion, 126th Infantry Regiment, in Wyoming
      - Company C, 3rd Battalion, 126th Infantry Regiment, in Dowagiac
      - Company D (Weapons), 3rd Battalion, 126th Infantry Regiment, in Cadillac
      - Company I (Forward Support), 132nd Brigade Support Battalion, in Wyoming
    - 3rd Battalion (General Support Aviation), 238th Aviation Regiment, at Abrams Airport
      - Headquarters and Headquarters Company, 3rd Battalion (General Support Aviation), 238th Aviation Regiment, at Abrams Airport
        - Detachment 1, Headquarters and Headquarters Company, 3rd Battalion (General Support Aviation), 238th Aviation Regiment, at Wilmington Airport (DE) — (Delaware Army National Guard)
        - Detachment 2, Headquarters and Headquarters Company, 3rd Battalion (General Support Aviation), 238th Aviation Regiment, at Akron-Canton Airport (OH) — (Ohio Army National Guard)
      - Company A (CAC), 3rd Battalion (General Support Aviation), 238th Aviation Regiment, at Wilmington Airport (DE) (UH-60L Black Hawk) — (Delaware Army National Guard)
      - Company B (Heavy Lift), 3rd Battalion (General Support Aviation), 238th Aviation Regiment, at Akron-Canton Airport (OH) (CH-47F Chinook) — (Ohio Army National Guard)
        - Detachment 1, Company B (Heavy Lift), 3rd Battalion (General Support Aviation), 238th Aviation Regiment, at Selfridge Air National Guard Base
      - Company C (MEDEVAC), 3rd Battalion (General Support Aviation), 238th Aviation Regiment, at Concord Airport (NH) (HH-60L Black Hawk) — (New Hampshire Army National Guard)
        - Detachment 1, Company C (MEDEVAC), 3rd Battalion (General Support Aviation), 238th Aviation Regiment, at Abrams Airport
        - Detachment 2, Company C (MEDEVAC), 3rd Battalion (General Support Aviation), 238th Aviation Regiment, at Akron-Canton Airport (OH) — (Ohio Army National Guard)
      - Company D (AVUM), 3rd Battalion (General Support Aviation), 238th Aviation Regiment, at Abrams Airport
        - Detachment 1, Company D (AVUM), 3rd Battalion (General Support Aviation), 238th Aviation Regiment, at Wilmington Airport (DE) — (Delaware Army National Guard)
        - Detachment 2, Company D (AVUM), 3rd Battalion (General Support Aviation), 238th Aviation Regiment, at Akron-Canton Airport (OH) — (Ohio Army National Guard)
        - Detachment 3, Company D (AVUM), 3rd Battalion (General Support Aviation), 238th Aviation Regiment, at Concord Airport (NH) — (New Hampshire Army National Guard)
        - Detachment 5, Company D (AVUM), 3rd Battalion (General Support Aviation), 238th Aviation Regiment, at Robinson Army Airfield (AR) — (Arkansas Army National Guard)
        - Detachment 6, Company D (AVUM), 3rd Battalion (General Support Aviation), 238th Aviation Regiment, at Springfield Airport (MO) — (Missouri Army National Guard)
        - Detachment 7, Company D (AVUM), 3rd Battalion (General Support Aviation), 238th Aviation Regiment, at Selfridge Air National Guard Base
      - Company E (Forward Support), 3rd Battalion (General Support Aviation), 238th Aviation Regiment, at Abrams Airport
        - Detachment 1, Company E (Forward Support), 3rd Battalion (General Support Aviation), 238th Aviation Regiment, at Wilmington Airport (DE) — (Delaware Army National Guard)
        - Detachment 2, Company E (Forward Support), 3rd Battalion (General Support Aviation), 238th Aviation Regiment, at Akron-Canton Airport (OH) — (Ohio Army National Guard)
        - Detachment 3, Company E (Forward Support), 3rd Battalion (General Support Aviation), 238th Aviation Regiment, at Concord Airport (NH) — (New Hampshire Army National Guard)
        - Detachment 6, Company E (Forward Support), 3rd Battalion (General Support Aviation), 238th Aviation Regiment, at Robinson Army Airfield (AR) — (Arkansas Army National Guard)
        - Detachment 7, Company E (Forward Support), 3rd Battalion (General Support Aviation), 238th Aviation Regiment, at Springfield Airport (MO) — (Missouri Army National Guard)
      - Company F (ATS), 3rd Battalion (General Support Aviation), 238th Aviation Regiment, at Abrams Airport
      - Company G (MEDEVAC), 3rd Battalion (General Support Aviation), 238th Aviation Regiment, at Hawkins Field (MS) — (HH-60L Black Hawk) — (Mississippi Army National Guard)
        - Detachment 1, Company G (MEDEVAC), 3rd Battalion (General Support Aviation), 238th Aviation Regiment, at Robinson Army Airfield (AR) — (Arkansas Army National Guard)
        - Detachment 2, Company G (MEDEVAC), 3rd Battalion (General Support Aviation), 238th Aviation Regiment, at Springfield Airport (MO) — (Missouri Army National Guard)
      - Company B, 1st Battalion (Security & Support), 112th Aviation Regiment, at Abrams Airport (UH-72A Lakota)
      - Company B, 1st Battalion (Assault), 147th Aviation Regiment, at Abrams Airport (UH-60M Black Hawk)
      - Company C, 1st Battalion (Assault), 147th Aviation Regiment, at Abrams Airport (UH-60M Black Hawk)
        - Detachment 1, Headquarters and Headquarters Company, 1st Battalion (Assault), 147th Aviation Regiment, at Abrams Airport
        - Detachment 1, Company D (AVUM), 1st Battalion (Assault), 147th Aviation Regiment, at Abrams Airport
        - Detachment 1, Company E (Forward Support), 1st Battalion (Assault), 147th Aviation Regiment, at Abrams Airport
      - Detachment 2, Company B (AVIM), 351st Aviation Support Battalion, at Abrams Airport
      - Detachment 6, Company B (AVIM), 351st Aviation Support Battalion, at Selfridge Air National Guard Base
  - 177th Military Police Brigade, in Taylor
    - Headquarters and Headquarters Company, 177th Military Police Brigade, in Taylor
    - 107th Engineer Battalion, in Ishpeming
      - Headquarters and Headquarters Company, 107th Engineer Battalion, in Ishpeming
      - Forward Support Company, 107th Engineer Battalion, in Marquette
      - 1430th Engineer Company (Vertical Construction Company), in Traverse City
      - 1431st Engineer Company (Sapper), in Calumet
        - Detachment 1, 1431st Engineer Company (Sapper), in Kingsford
      - 1432nd Engineer Company (Engineer Support Company), in Kingsford
        - Detachment 1, 1432nd Engineer Company (Engineer Support Company), in Gladstone
      - 1437th Engineer Company (Multirole Bridge), in Sault Ste. Marie
        - Detachment 1, 1437th Engineer Company (Multirole Bridge), in Marquette
    - 156th Expeditionary Signal Battalion, in Howell
      - Headquarters and Headquarters Company, 156th Expeditionary Signal Battalion, in Howell
      - Company A, 156th Expeditionary Signal Battalion, in Wyoming
      - Company B, 156th Expeditionary Signal Battalion, in Kalamazoo
      - Company C, 156th Expeditionary Signal Battalion, in Howell
    - 210th Military Police Battalion, in Taylor
      - Headquarters and Headquarters Detachment, 210th Military Police Battalion, in Taylor
      - 46th Military Police Company (Combat Support), in Corunna
      - 460th Chemical Company, at Fort Custer Training Center
      - 1775th Military Police Company (Combat Support), in Pontiac
      - 1776th Military Police Company (Combat Support), in Taylor
    - 507th Engineer Battalion, in Kalamazoo
      - Headquarters and Headquarters Company, 507th Engineer Battalion, in Kalamazoo
      - Forward Support Company, 507th Engineer Battalion, in Kalamazoo
      - 745th Ordnance Company (EOD), at Camp Grayling (part of 501st Ordnance Battalion (EOD))
      - 1433rd Engineer Company (Combat Engineer Company — Infantry), at Fort Custer Training Center
      - 1434th Engineer Company (Vertical Construction Company), in Ypsilanti
      - 1436th Engineer Company (Engineer Construction Company), in Montague
      - 1439th Engineer Detachment (Fire Fighting Team — Fire Truck), in Alpena
      - 1440th Engineer Detachment (Fire Fighting Team — HQ), in Alpena
      - 1442nd Engineer Detachment (Fire Fighting Team — Fire Truck), in Alpena
  - 272nd Regional Support Group, in Lansing
    - Headquarters and Headquarters Company, 272nd Regional Support Group, in Lansing
    - 1st Battalion, 119th Field Artillery Regiment, in Lansing (M777A2) (part of 169th Field Artillery Brigade)
      - Headquarters and Headquarters Battery, 1st Battalion, 119th Field Artillery Regiment, in Lansing
      - Battery A, 1st Battalion, 119th Field Artillery Regiment, in Port Huron
      - Battery B, 1st Battalion, 119th Field Artillery Regiment, in Alma
      - Battery C, 1st Battalion, 119th Field Artillery Regiment, in Albion
      - 119th Forward Support Company, at Fort Custer Training Center
    - 1st Battalion, 182nd Field Artillery Regiment, in Detroit (M142 HIMARS) (part of 197th Field Artillery Brigade)
      - Headquarters and Headquarters Battery, 1st Battalion, 182nd Field Artillery Regiment, in Detroit
      - Battery A, 1st Battalion, 182nd Field Artillery Regiment, in Detroit
      - Battery B, 1st Battalion, 182nd Field Artillery Regiment, in Bay City
      - 182nd Forward Support Company, in Detroit
    - 146th Medical Battalion (Multifunctional), in Ypsilanti
      - Headquarters and Headquarters Detachment, 146th Medical Battalion (Multifunctional), in Ypsilanti
      - 1171st Medical Company (Area Support), in Ypsilanti
    - 246th Transportation Battalion (Motor), in Jackson
      - Headquarters and Headquarters Detachment, 246th Transportation Battalion (Motor), in Jackson
      - 1460th Transportation Company (Medium Truck) (PLS), in Midland
      - 1461st Transportation Company (Combat HET), in Jackson
      - 1463rd Transportation Company (Medium Truck) (Cargo), at Fort Custer Training Center
    - 1225th Combat Sustainment Support Battalion, in Detroit
      - Headquarters and Headquarters Company, 1225th Combat Sustainment Support Battalion, in Detroit
      - 464th Quartermaster Company (Field Service), in Lapeer
      - 1071st Ordnance Company (Support Maintenance), at Camp Grayling
      - 1073rd Ordnance Company (Support Maintenance), in Greenville
  - 177th Regiment, Regional Training Institute, at Fort Custer Training Center
    - 1st Battalion, at Fort Custer Training Center
    - 2nd Battalion, at Fort Custer Training Center
    - Ordnance Training Company, Regional Training Site-Maintenance, at Fort Custer Training Center

Aviation unit abbreviations: CAC — Command Aviation Company; MEDEVAC — Medical evacuation; AVUM — Aviation Unit Maintenance; AVIM — Aviation Intermediate Maintenance; ATS — Air Traffic Service

== Notable former members ==
- Rosemarie Aquilina, judge of the 30th circuit court in Ingham County, Michigan
- Tom Barrett, current United States Representative for Michigan’s 7th congressional district (2025-)
- Kerry Bentivolio, former United States Representative for Michigan's 11th congressional district, 2013 to 2015
- Jerry Cannon, retired Major General
- Louis Chapin Covell, United States army officer and businessman
- Valde Garcia, member of the Michigan Senate from 2003 to 2010
- Alvin H. Kukuk, member of the Michigan House of Representatives from 1993 through 1998.
- Harry Lovejoy Rogers, Quartermaster General of the United States Army from 1918 to 1922.
- J. Sumner Rogers, founder and longtime superintendent of the Michigan Military Academy
- Paul D. Rogers, 34th adjutant general of the Michigan National Guard.
- John B. Sosnowski, politician from the U.S. state of Michigan
- Leonard C. Ward, Brigadier General, Chief of the Army Division (now Director of the Army National Guard) at the National Guard Bureau.

== See also ==
- Michigan Naval Militia
- Michigan Volunteer Defense Force
