= Michigan Defense Force =

State agency of Michigan

Agency overview
- Formed: 2004
- Preceding agencies: Michigan State Troops Home Guard (1917–1952); Michigan Emergency Volunteers (1988–1998)
- Headquarters: Lansing, Michigan
- Employees: 100 officers and enlisted members
- Agency executives: Gretchen Whitmer, Governor of Michigan and Commander-in-Chief; LTC (MI) Jefferey R. Connell,(Ret), Brigade Commander; Anthony Gusumano (Officer and Deputy Administrator)
- Parent agency: Michigan Department of Military and Veterans Affairs
- Child agency: 1st – 2nd Battalions
- Website: midefenseforce.us

The Michigan Defense Force (MIDF), formerly Michigan Volunteer Defense Force (MIVDF), is a military force, constituted as a state defense force and an element of the Michigan Department of Military and Veterans Affairs. The MIDF is one of the three components of the military establishment of Michigan, along with the Army National Guard and the Air National Guard.

== History ==
=== Michigan State Troops ===
Michigan's first state defense force was established as the Michigan State Troops Home Guard along with the Michigan State Troops Permanent Force in Act No. 53 Public Acts of Michigan on 17 April 1917. The Michigan State Troops organizations served on in-state active duty during World Wars I and II, and the Korean War.

=== Michigan Emergency Volunteers ===
The Michigan State Troops were reconstituted as the Michigan Emergency Volunteers (MEV) by Public Act 246 of 1988. The MEV's original intention was for it to be a trained emergency volunteer force in case the National Guard was sent out of the state in a national emergency. The MEV was disbanded in October 1998.

=== Michigan Volunteer Defense Force / Michigan Defense Force ===
The word volunteer has been dropped from the name. The Michigan Defense Force is the third branch of the Michigan military along with the Michigan Army National Guard and Michigan Air National Guard. All the missions and training are done in Michigan. Drills are one weekend a month and training events are usually two weeks per year, focusing on disaster response, search and rescue, first aid, military customs and courtesies, and drill and ceremony. The maximum enlistment age is 55.

== Uniforms, training, and duties ==
The uniform differs slightly from the Army uniform; MIDF soldiers wear the state flag on their right shoulder instead of the American flag.

The MIDF is tasked with emergency management missions such as handling the reception, storage and stationing of the Strategic National Stockpile in Michigan, and supplying trained and uniformed Community Emergency Response Teams.

MIDF missions have included working alongside the Michigan Department of Military and Veterans Affairs in processing benefit applications for military veterans, and providing disaster response aid including tree and debris removal following tornado activity.

As of 2022, the force's mission is: to provide ready and able military forces to assist state and local authorities in times of state emergencies and to augment the Michigan Army National Guard and Michigan Air National Guard as required.

== See also ==
- Michigan Naval Militia
- Michigan Wing Civil Air Patrol
