= John E. Schwarz =

American political scientist (born 1939)

John E. Schwarz (born October 6, 1939) is an American political scientist.

He graduated from Oberlin College with a B.A. in 1961, received his Ph.D from Indiana University in 1967, and studied at the London School of Economics and Political Science and L'Institut d'Etudes Politiques de Paris. He was an economic adviser to Senator Birch Bayh of Indiana in 1963, completed work for his Ph.D. in Belgium and Luxembourg in 1964-66, and then went on to teach at the University of Minnesota from 1966 to 1970 and the University of Arizona from 1970 to 2004. In 2006, he became a distinguished senior fellow at Demos, a public policy research organization in New York City.

== Early life and career ==
Schwarz was raised in a Jewish family in Westchester County, New York, the son of Erwin Schwarz, who was in the woolen business, and Louise Lasker Schwarz, who did philanthropic work for the Federation of Jewish Philanthropies and the Community Service Society. Schwarz attended Scarsdale High School and was an avid athlete.

Schwarz began his academic career at the University of Minnesota in 1966. In 1970, he moved to the University of Arizona, where he continued his career up until his retirement in 2004. A devoted teacher, he was a winner of the Danforth Teaching Award at the University of Arizona. He was Chair of the Faculty at the University of Arizona from 1995 to 1997 and is now a Professor Emeritus in the Department of Political Science in the College of Social and Behavioral Science. Schwarz's research and writing initially emphasized democratic politics, particularly representative legislatures, resulting in The United States Congress in Comparative Perspective, co-authored with L. Earl Shaw and published in 1976. The book examined the legislatures of the United States, Britain, France, and West Germany from 1950 to the early 1970s.

Schwarz then assessed the actual results of the public policies enacted by Congress, which culminated in a 1983 best-selling book, America's Hidden Success: A Reassessment of Twenty Years of Public Policy. It described how the programs legislated under the New Frontier and the Great Society, (which by Ronald Reagan's presidency had increasingly become viewed as failures), instead saved Americans from far more serious unemployment and inflationary disasters in the 1960s and 1970s, which would have otherwise been inevitable with the entry of the gargantuan baby-boom generation into the labor market and economy. Schwarz then turned to assessing the results of public policies enacted during the Reagan and later administrations, focusing on workers and the larger economy. The research ended in two books, The Forgotten Americans: 30 Million Working Poor in the Land of Opportunity in 1992 (co-authored with Thomas J. Volgy) and Illusions of Opportunity: The American Dream in Question (1997). The former book discovered that dramatically more Americans occupied low-wage jobs, with little mobility upward, than was generally understood by either government officials or the public. Current economic policies (such as the frozen minimum wage and reduced public assistance) and flawed economic measures (such as the increasingly outdated poverty line) greatly exacerbated the problem. The basic family budgets set forth in The Forgotten Americans, coupled with its analysis of the levels of hourly pay needed to meet those basic budgets, helped give rise to living-wage movements in a number of states and cities. It also helped press the federal government to consider altering its standard measure of the poverty line and spurred some states and cities to enact a higher local minimum wage. In Illusions of Opportunity Schwarz shows how to quantify the shortage of adequate jobs for workers and families in the American economy in a period spanning from the late 1960s to the mid-1990s.

Schwarz's next book, Freedom Reclaimed: Recovering the American Vision (2005), received positive reviews in prominent publications. The book brought together three earlier interests that guided Schwarz's work: democratic representation, the content of public policies, and their impact on the economy and opportunity for Americans. Schwarz develops a philosophical narrative that reveals the vital moral interconnection of the three areas of interest within a tradition of American thinking that reaches back to the nation's founding philosophy. Schwarz discovered that this philosophy corresponded closely with the policies that the government had been adopting and implementing.

Common Credo: The Path Back to American Success (2013) explored the government's present actions and operations relative to the founding moral tradition. It stated the numerous ways in which the essentials of the founding philosophy, whose implementation accounted for the nation's success in the past, have become misunderstood by Republicans as well as Democrats, liberals and conservatives alike, over the past four decades. The book argues that the nation's increasing departure from the principles of the philosophy during those four decades sewed the seeds for the nation's most intractable problems, such as the economy's collapse in 2008 and its slowed growth for years both before and after the collapse.

== Works ==
Schwarz has published six books:

- The United States Congress in Comparative Perspective with L. Earl Shaw, 1975.
- America's Hidden Success: A Reassessment of Twenty Years of Public Policy W. W. Norton & Company, 1983.
- The Forgotten Americans with Thomas J. Volgy. W. W. Norton & Company, 1992
- Illusions of Opportunity: The American Dream in Question. W. W. Norton & Company, 1997
- Freedom Reclaimed: Recovering the American Vision. Johns Hopkins University Press, 2005;
- Common Credo: The Path Back to American Success. Liveright Publishing Corporation, 2013

Schwarz's articles have appeared in The New York Times, The Washington Post, ABC News, The Atlantic, and The New Republic.

== Personal life ==
Schwarz lives in Tucson, Arizona, with his wife Maria Proytcheva Schwarz, who is a pathologist. He was married for forty-two years to Judith Bendix Schwarz, who died in 2005. He has three children—Jodi, Jennifer (now known as Kazimer), and Laurie—and five grandchildren.
