= Michigan Veterans Affairs Agency =

Government organization

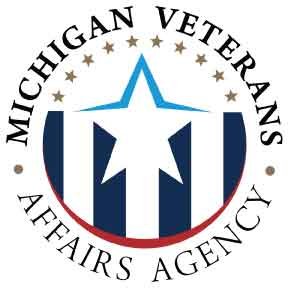

Agency overview
- Formed: January 18, 2013
- Agency executives: Brian Love, Director; Todd Butler, Acting Deputy Director
- Parent agency: Michigan Department of Military and Veterans Affairs
- Website: michigan.gov/mvaa

The Michigan Veterans Affairs Agency (MVAA) is a state government agency which is a part of the Department of Military and Veterans Affairs that functions as the central coordinating point for Michigan veterans, connecting those who have served in the U.S. Armed Forces, and their families, to services and benefits throughout the state.

The agency director is of a cabinet-level, the chief advisor to Governor and all department head regarding veterans services' policies, programs and procedures.

== Background ==
The State began making veterans service organization (VSO) grant appropriation in 1927 with one to the American Legion. Soon, grants were extended to the Veterans of Foreign Wars and the Disabled American Veterans. Two more VSOs, American Veterans of World War II and Korea (AMVETS) and the Marine Corps League were added by 1960 with 11 VSOs receiving grants and the Veterans of World War I receives a token amount.^{:13}

Post-World War II, the state set up a trust fund, Michigan Veterans Trust Fund, for financial assistance to wartime veterans.

All but some rural Michigan counties operated veterans offices with veterans counselors, but many such offices face funding shortfalls and under-staffing. The state and local government provided vocational training to states.

=== Veterans Affairs Directorate ===
The Veterans Affairs Directorate was formed in 1997 to consolidate the department's major veteran's programs.^{:1} The Veterans Affairs Directorate managed the Michigan Veterans' Trust Fund, Vietnam Veterans' Memorial Monument Fund and two homes for veterans. The Veteran's Fund is under the direction of the Board of Trustees, which has seven members, while the Monument Fund is under a nine-member governing Commission. State Veterans Home Board of Managers had oversight of the two veteran homes. The directorate also directs grants to 12 veterans' service organizations as specified by law.

== Agency history ==
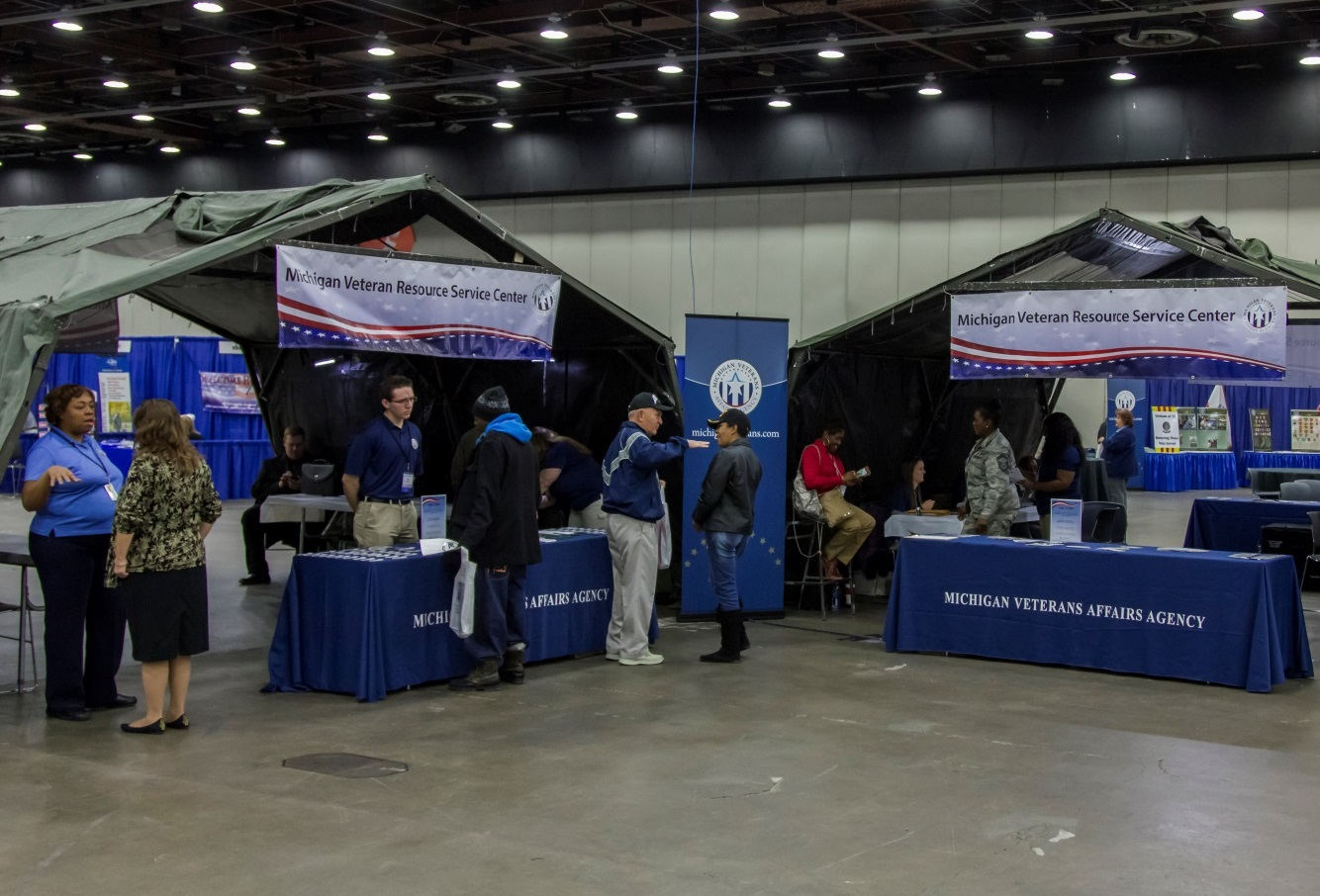
The Michigan Veterans Resource Service Center (MVRSC) connecting with veterans at a Veteran Expo

Michigan was last in veteran benefit amounts in 2010. In 2013, 22 percent of Michigan's veterans were receiving health benefits from the Veterans Health Administration and moved to five from the bottom in spending. With a large number of veterans in the state, Governor Snyder decided veterans missing out on benefits was unacceptable.

The agency was created when Governor Rick Snyder issued an executive order Jan. 18, 2013, within the Department of Military and Veterans Affairs effective March 20, 2013. The agency took over from the department various responsibilities formerly held directly by the department in its Veterans Affairs Directorate, support for the State Veterans Home Board of Managers and Veterans Speakers Program. Jeff Barnes was appointed the agency's first director. In April 2013, the agency moved from the department's headquarter north of downtown Lansing to downtown Washington Square.

In July 2014, the agency started a hotline operation, Michigan Veteran Resource Service Center, similar to and in conjunction with United Ways' 2-1-1 telephone information system. The service is a first for a state to be fully integrated with the 2-1-1 system.

In June 2019, a new director was named, Zaneta Adams, becoming the first woman veteran to serve on the Cabinet. https://www.michigan.gov/dmva/0,9665,7-402-100108_95837_97632-251980--,00.html

In 2019, the Michigan Veterans Homes was established by the Facility Authority and Anne Zerbe became its Executive Director.

== Units ==
- Michigan Veterans Trust Fund - seven-member Board of Trustees
- Michigan Veteran Resource Service Center
