= Michigan Department of Military and Veterans Affairs =

Department of Military and Veterans Affairs
- Michigan Department of Military and Veterans Affairs

Department overview
- Department executives: Major General Paul D. Rogers, Adjutant General, Michigan National Guard & Director; Major General Leonard W. Isabelle Jr., Assistant Adjutant General - Installations; Russell Gullett, Senior Deputy Director for State Operations
- Child agencies: Michigan Army National Guard; Michigan Air National Guard; Michigan Volunteer Defense Force; Michigan Veterans Affairs Agency
- Website: michigan.gov/dmva/

The Michigan Department of Military and Veterans Affairs is a principal department of the State of Michigan. It oversees the military components and veterans services for the State. The military components are the Michigan National Guard and Michigan Defense Force (MIDF).

== History ==
The Department of Military Affairs was formed as one of the initial principal departments under the Executive Organization Act of 1965 as required by the 1963 State Constitution. In 1997, the department was renamed the Department of Military and Veterans Affairs by Executive Order. In 2005 by Governor's Executive Order, the State Military Board was abolished with duties transfer to the department with the Governor's approval authority over the Military Board was transferred to the State Administrative Board.

Governor Rick Snyder issued an executive order on January 18, 2013, creating the Michigan Veterans Affairs Agency within the Department effective March 20, 2013.
