= 46th Military Police Command =

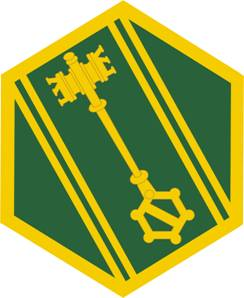
- Shoulder sleeve insignia
- Active: 2005 - present
- Country: United States
- Branch: United States Army National Guard
- Type: Military Police command
- Role: Military Police
- Size: Command (military formation)
- Part of: Michigan Army National Guard
- Garrison/HQ: Lansing, Michigan
- Nickname: Peacekeepers
- Motto: Securing Freedom Worldwide
- Colors: Green and gold

Commanders
- Commander: MG Scott Hiipakka
- Deputy Commander: BG Scott House
- Command Sergeant Major: CSM James R. Taylor

Insignia
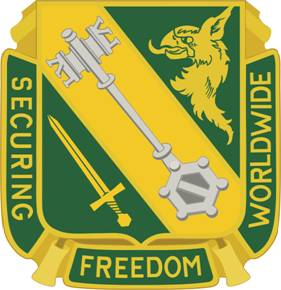
- Distinctive unit insignia

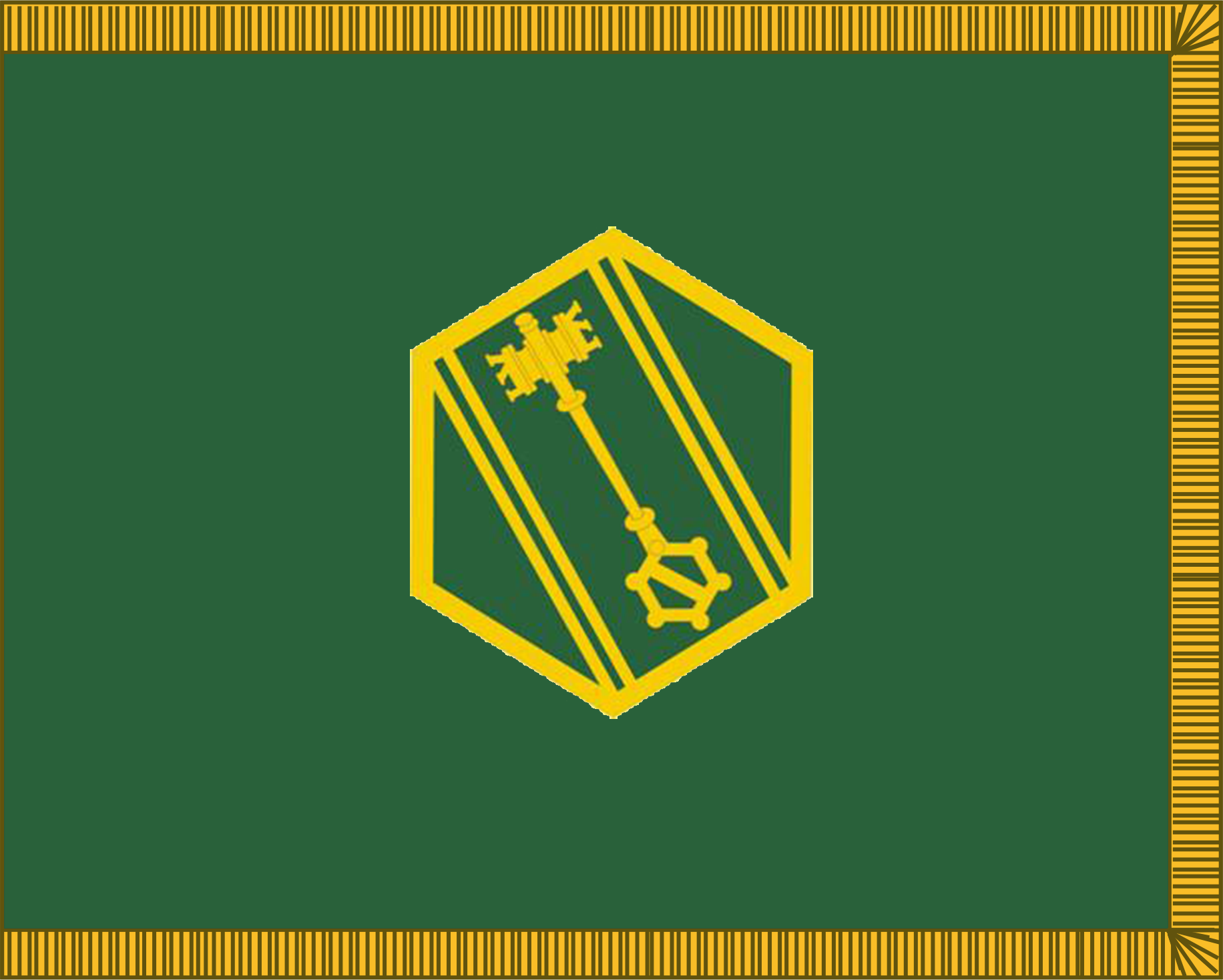
- 46th Military Police Command Flag

The 46th Military Police Command is a command level military police headquarters element within the Michigan Army National Guard capable of training, deploying, and providing command and control for military police, corrections, and criminal investigation division (CID) units. Its mission is to provide command and control for the operational/tactical planning, supervision, coordination and integration of assigned or attached military police combat support and internment/resettlement brigades and other military police units engaged in Army, joint, and multinational military police operations in support of the Army/combatant commander's priorities. The 46th Military Police Command was activated in 2006 after a major restructuring of Army National Guard assets.

== C2CRE-B ==
The 46th Military Police Command currently carries the mission as the Command and Control element for the CBRN-E Response Element (C2CRE) for U.S. Army North. The mission requires the 46th to be ready to respond to a Chemical, Biological, Radiological or Nuclear attack or disaster within the United States in support of local, state, and other federal emergency responders.
