= Michigan Naval Militia =

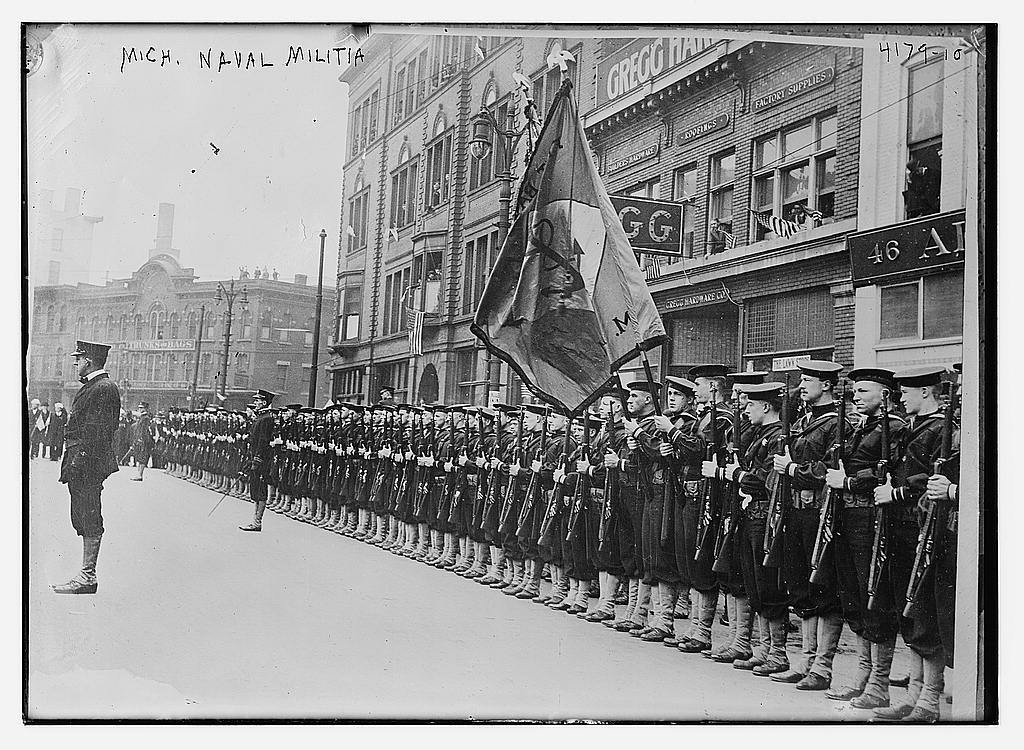
Michigan Naval Militia sailors standing at attention, date unknown.

The Michigan Naval Militia was founded in 1893. It is currently an unorganized naval militia of the U.S. state and is recognized as a component of the militia of Michigan. The Michigan Naval Militia, along with the Michigan National Guard and the Michigan Volunteer Defense Force, exists as one of the military components of Michigan's organized militia.

== History ==
During the Spanish–American War, members of the Michigan Naval Militia, organized into the Michigan Naval Brigade, constituted the majority of the crew of USS Yosemite. During the war, Yosemite intercepted the Spanish steamer SS Antonio Lopez, beginning the Third Battle of San Juan.

The naval militia remained active through World War I, and included a University of Michigan division. During the war, members of the Michigan Naval Militia served in Naval Railway Battery crews on the Western Front.From 1922 through the Second World War the USS Dubuque, Patrol Gunboat 17 served as a training vessel crewed by the reservists. It was federalized in November, 1940 and after refitting at Boston Navy Yard was based at Little Creek, Virginia and trained the Naval Armed Guard crews of merchant vessels throughout the war.

== Personnel ==
Naval militias are partially regulated and equipped by the federal government, and membership requirements are set in accordance with federal standards. Under 10 U.S. Code § 7854, in order to be eligible for access to "vessels, material, armament, equipment, and other facilities of the Navy and the Marine Corps available to the Navy Reserve and the Marine Corps Reserve", at least 95% of members of the naval militia must also be members of the United States Navy Reserve or the United States Marine Corps Reserve.

== Legal status ==
Naval militias of U.S. states are recognized as a component of the organized militia of the United States under 10 U.S. Code §7851. Michigan law recognizes the Michigan Naval Militia as a component of the militia of Michigan. Therefore, the Michigan Legislature has the legal authority to reactivate the naval militia.
