= Michigan National Guard =

Military reserve force in Michigan, United States

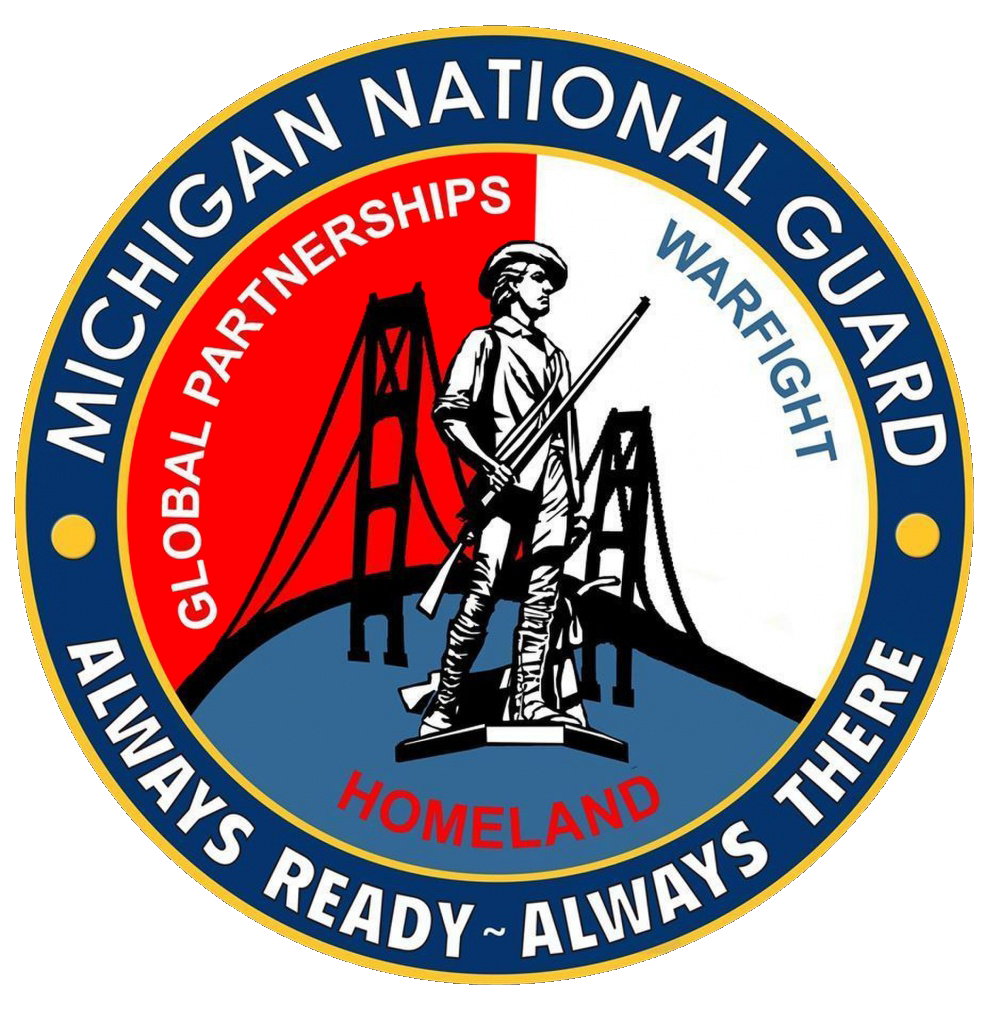
- Active: November 13, 1708 - Present
- Country: United States
- Branch: National Guard (United States)
- Size: ~ 10,000 members

Commanders
- The Adjutant General: MG Paul D. Rogers
- State Senior Enlisted Leader: CSM William W. Russell III
- State Command Chief Warrant Officer: CW5 Allen C. Robinson, Jr
- Assistant Adjutant General - Army: BG Ravindra V. Wagh
- Senior Enlisted Leader - Army: CSM Matthew L. Hopkins
- Assistant Adjutant General - Air: Brig Gen Daniel J. Kramer II
- Senior Enlisted Leader - Air: CMSgt Jenny R. Balabuch

The Michigan National Guard is a division of the Michigan Department of Military and Veterans Affairs and consists of the Michigan Army National Guard and the Michigan Air National Guard.

== Units ==
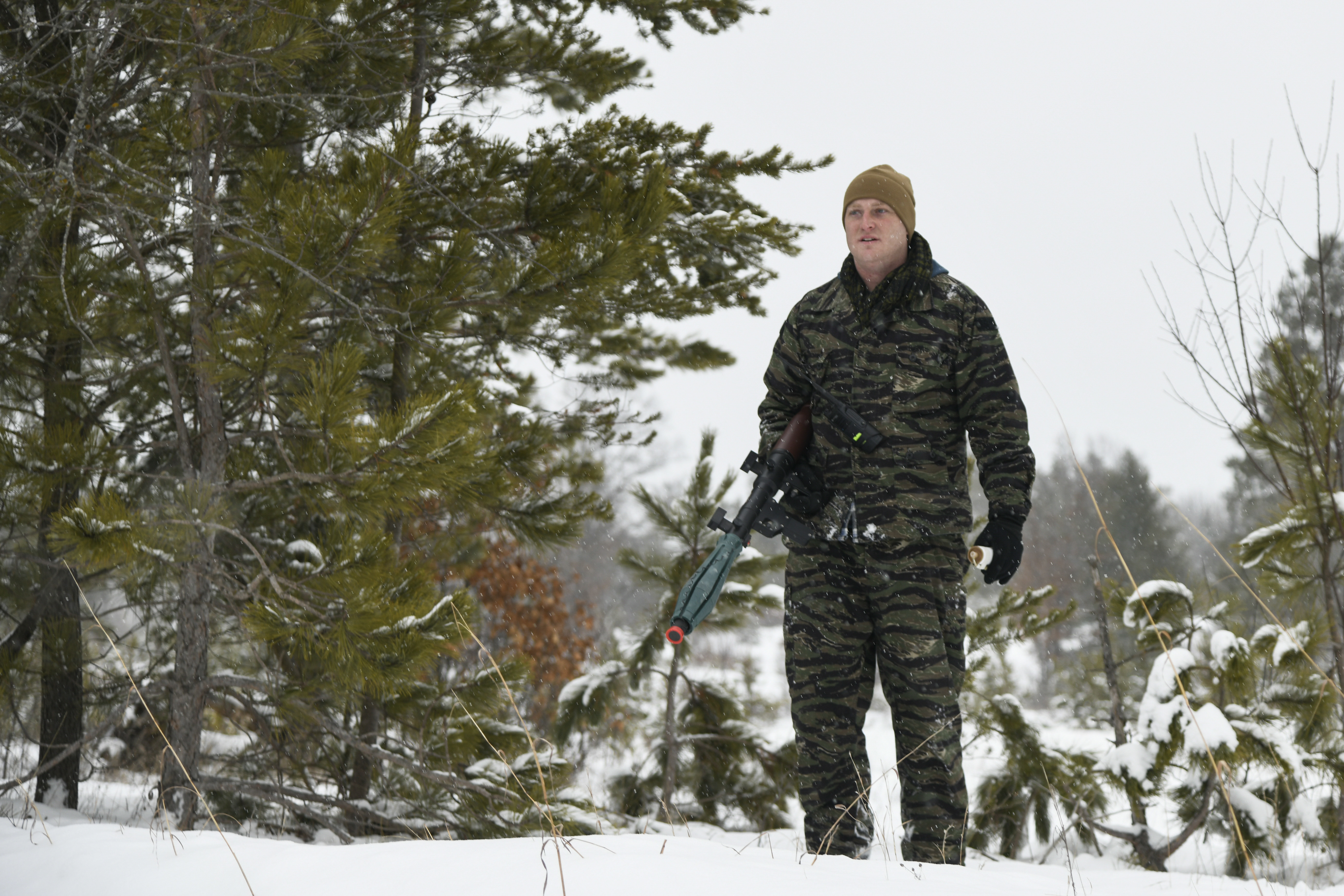
A Michigan National Guardsman conducts OPFOR while wearing tiger stripe camouflage uniform and armed with a simulated RPG-7.

== Installations ==
- Camp Grayling Joint Maneuver Training Center - Grayling, MI
- Fort Custer Training Center - Augusta, MI
- Selfridge Air National Guard Base - Harrison Township, MI
- Battle Creek Air National Guard Base - Battle Creek, MI
- Alpena Combat Readiness Center - Alpena, MI
- Joint Forces Headquarters - Lansing, MI

== See also ==
- Michigan Department of Military and Veterans Affairs
- Michigan Naval Militia
- Michigan Volunteer Defense Force
