= 127th Operations Group =

Unit of the Michigan Air National Guard

127th Operations Group originally 361st Fighter Group
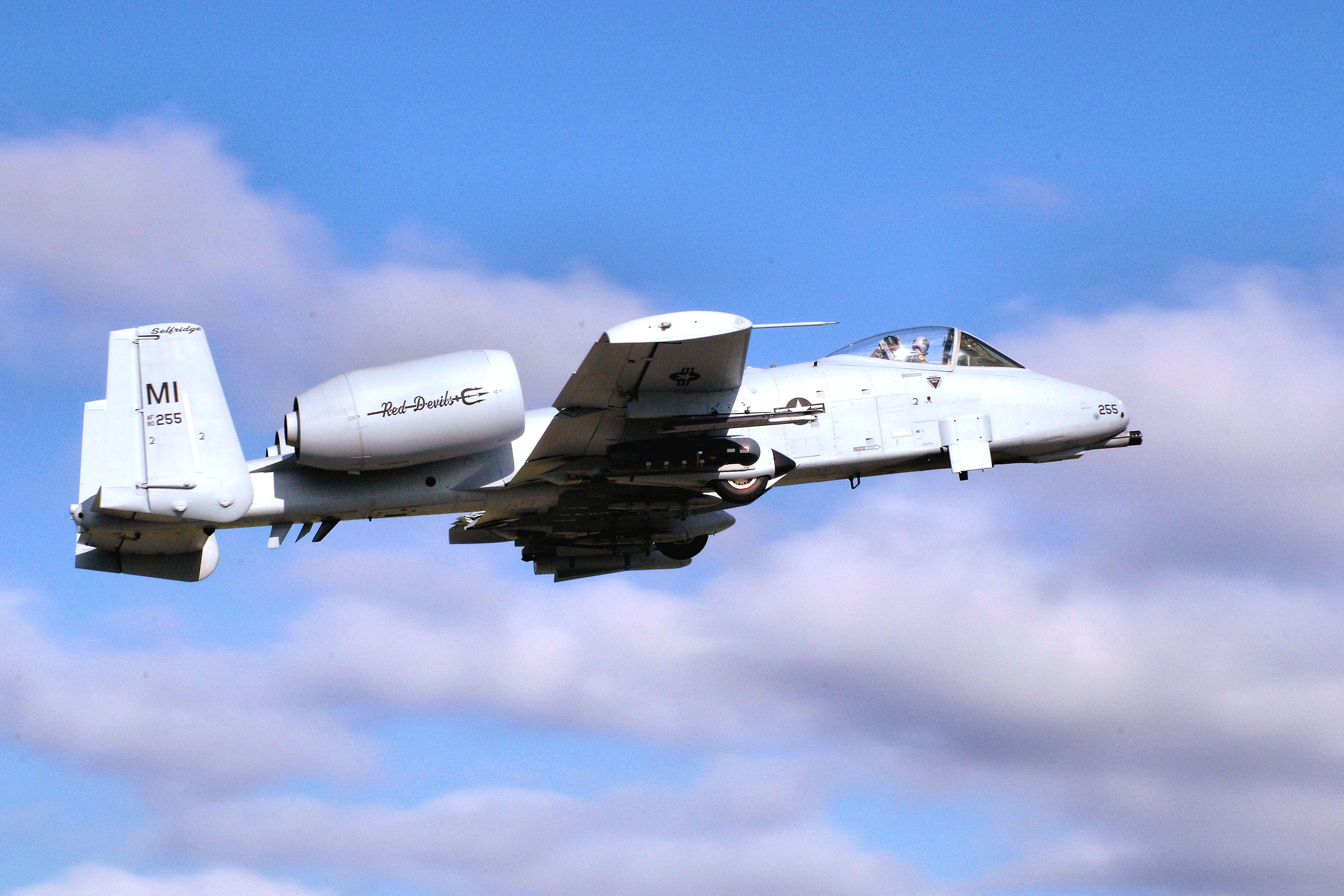
- 107th Fighter Squadron A-10 Thunderbolt II (Note: Aircraft is Republic A-10, serial 80-255 at Selfridge ANGB.)
- Active: 1943–1945; 1946–1952; 1952–1974; 1993–present
- Country: United States
- Branch: United States Air Force
- Role: Fighter
- Part of: Michigan Air National Guard
- Garrison/HQ: Selfridge ANGB, Michigan
- Nickname(s): Yellow Jackets (World War II)
- Motto(s): We Stand Ready (Note: Originally approved as Parati Stamus Latin. Maurer, Combat units, pp. 243-244.)
- Colors: Yellow (World War II)
- Engagements: European Theater of Operations

Insignia
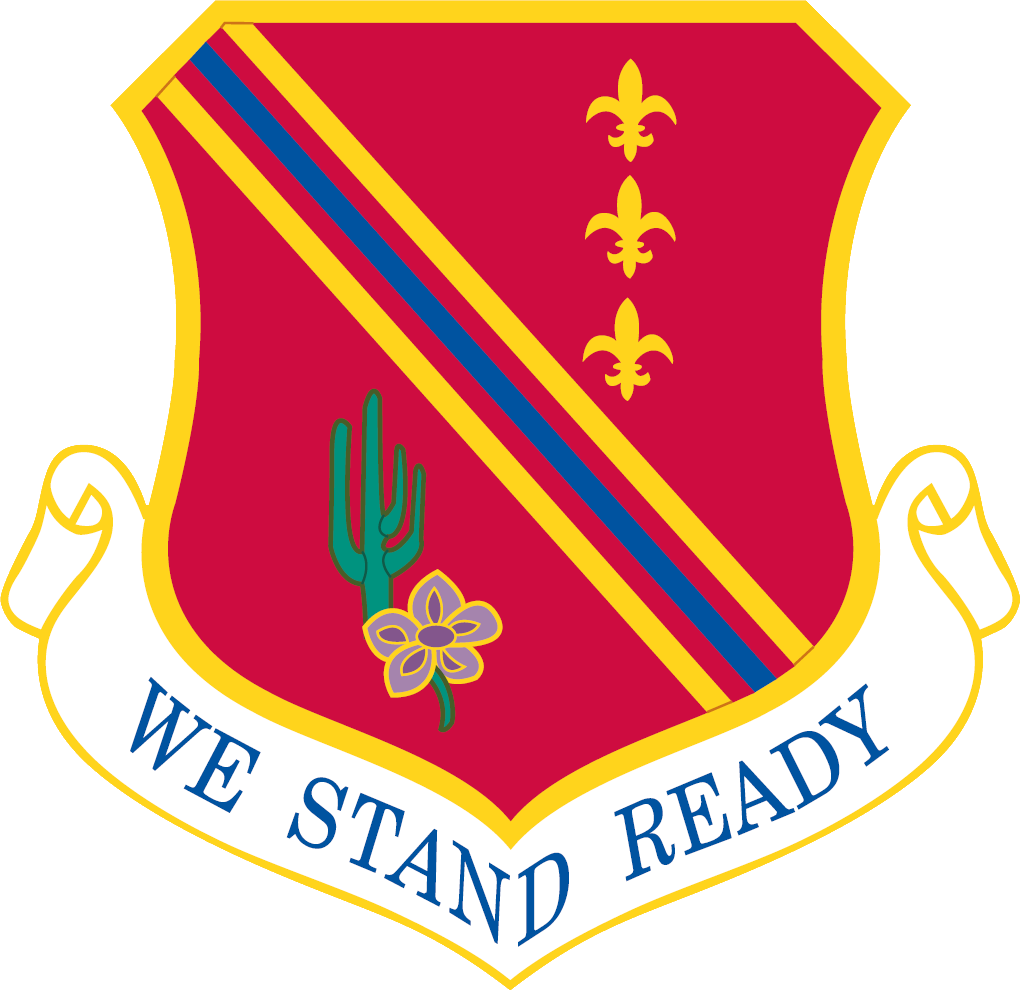
- 127th Operations Group emblem (Note: While assigned to the 127th Wing, the group uses the wing emblem with the group designation on the scroll. AF Instruction 84-105, Organizational Lineage, Honors and History, 27 April 2017, paragraph 3.3.3)

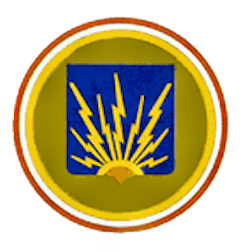
- 361st Fighter Group emblem

The 127th Operations Group is a unit of the Michigan Air National Guard. It is stationed at Selfridge Air National Guard Base and is one of two flying groups assigned to the 127th Wing. The group operates Fairchild Republic A-10 Thunderbolt II ground attack aircraft.

The group was first formed during World War II as the 361st Fighter Group. It served in the European Theater of Operations as part of VIII Fighter Command, flying its last mission on 20 April 1945.

In 1946, the group was allotted to the Air National Guard as the 127th Fighter Group. In 1951, as a result of the Korean War, the group was called to active duty, and trained pilots for the United States Air Force as the 127th Pilot Training Group. In November 1952, it was returned to the Michigan Air National Guard as the 127th Fighter-Bomber Group. in 1955, it became the 127th Fighter-Interceptor Group and in 1958 converted to the aerial reconnaissance mission as the 127th Tactical Reconnaissance Group. It resumed the fighter mission in 1972 as the 127th Tactical Fighter Group, but was inactivated two years later. With the implementation of the Objective Wing organization, the group was again activated as the 127th Operations Group.

== History ==
=== World War II ===
==== Activation and training in the United States ====
The group was first organized at Richmond Army Air Base, Virginia on 10 February 1943. Its components were the 374th, 375th, and 376th Fighter Squadrons. The group was equipped with Republic P-47 Thunderbolts and trained for combat at bases in Virginia, Maryland and New Jersey. On 12 November 1943, the group moved to Camp Shanks, New York for shipment overseas. It sailed on the RMS Queen Elizabeth for the European Theater of Operations on 23 November.

==== Combat in Europe ====
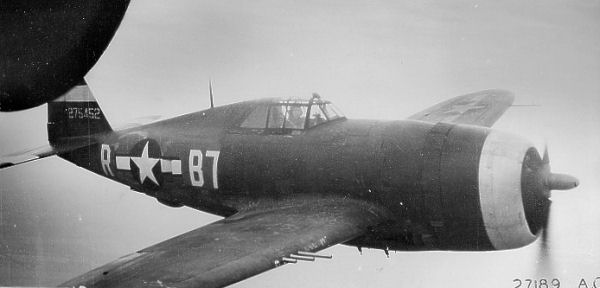
Group Republic P-47D Thunderbolt (Note: Aircraft is Republic P-47D-11-RE Thunderbolt, serial 42-75452 "Tika" (B7-R) of 1st Lt Vernon R. Richards of the 374th Fighter Squadron. Lost attacking the Arras marshaling yards on 12 August 1944. MACR 7784))

The group arrived at the Firth of Clyde on 29 November and moved to RAF Bottisham, England the following day. It would be the last P-47 Thunderbolt group to join Eighth Air Force. The 361st flew its first combat mission with its P-47 aircraft on 21 January 1944. The weight of the heavy P-47 fighters soon began to tell on the wet surface making take-offs tricky. A team of American engineers were called in during January 1944 and, in three days, they constructed a 4410 foot long runway with pierced steel planking (PSP). This feat was considered a record for laying this type of prefabricated surfacing. The runway, which was aligned NE-SW, became the main at Bottisham the other also being constructed of PSP. However, the group converted to North American P-51 Mustangs in May 1944 and flew them for the remainder of the war.

The unit served primarily as an escort organization, covering the penetration, attack, and withdrawal of Boeing B-17 Flying Fortress and Consolidated B-24 Liberator bomber formations that the Army Air Forces sent against targets on the Continent. The group also engaged in counter-air patrols, fighter sweeps, and strafing and dive bombing missions. Attacked such targets as airdromes, marshaling yards, industrial areas, ordnance depots, oil refineries, trains, and highways. It participated in Operation Crossbow, the attacks on German missile launch sites.

During its operations, the unit participated in the assault against the German Air Force and aircraft industry during the Big Week, 20–25 February 1944, and the attack on transportation facilities prior to D-Day and support of the invasion forces thereafter, including Operation Cobra, the breakout at Saint Lo, in July. In September 1944, the 361st moved to RAF Little Walden.

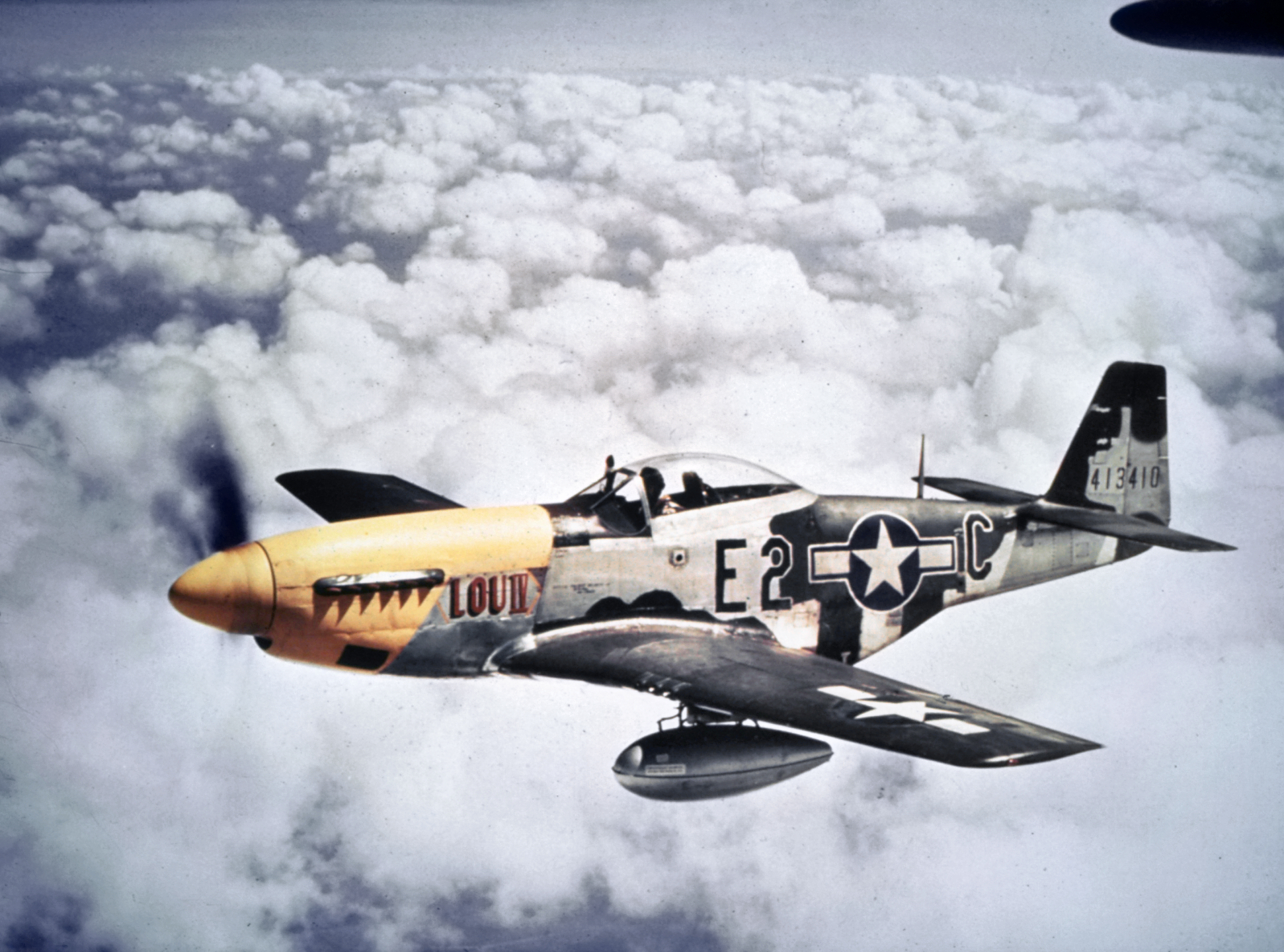
Group P-51D Mustang (Note: Aircraft is North American P-51D-5-NA Mustang, serial 44-13410 "Lou IV/Athelene" (E2-C) of Lt Col Thomas J. J. Christian Jr., commander of the 375th Fighter Squadron (KIA))

From its new base, the group supported Operation Market-Garden, the airborne attack on Rhine River crossings in the Netherlands in September 1944. In December 1944, the group deployed a detachment to France to support ground troops in the Battle of the Bulge. The detachment remained until January 1945. In February, the entire group deployed to Chievres Airfield, Belgium, flying tactical ground support missions during Operation Varsity, the airborne assault across the Rhine in Germany and remained until April.

The unit returned to RAF Little Walden and flew its last combat mission on 20 April 1945. Following V-E Day, many personnel were transferred from the unit, and in September and October, the group's aircraft were transferred to depots. The group's remaining personnel sailed from Southampton on the RMS Queen Mary on 4 November. On 9 November the 361st arrived at Camp Kilmer, New Jersey and was inactivated the following day.

=== Air National Guard ===
==== Formation and mobilization for the Korean War ====
In May 1946, the group was allotted to the National Guard and redesignated as the 127th Fighter Group. Two months later, the State of Michigan activated it at Wayne County Airport, near Detroit, and it received federal recognition in September. Its initial component was the 107th Bombardment Squadron, which had been an element of the Michigan Guard since 1926, except for periods when it was mobilized. By 1947, the group had added two of its World War II squadrons, the 374th (now the 171st) and 375th (now the 172nd) Fighter Squadrons. Although the 107th and 171st Squadrons were stationed with the group, the 172nd was at Kellogg Field, Michigan. The 172nd formed an acrobatic team, called the "Michigan Acro-Guards" and flew their F-51 Mustangs in aerial demonstrations.

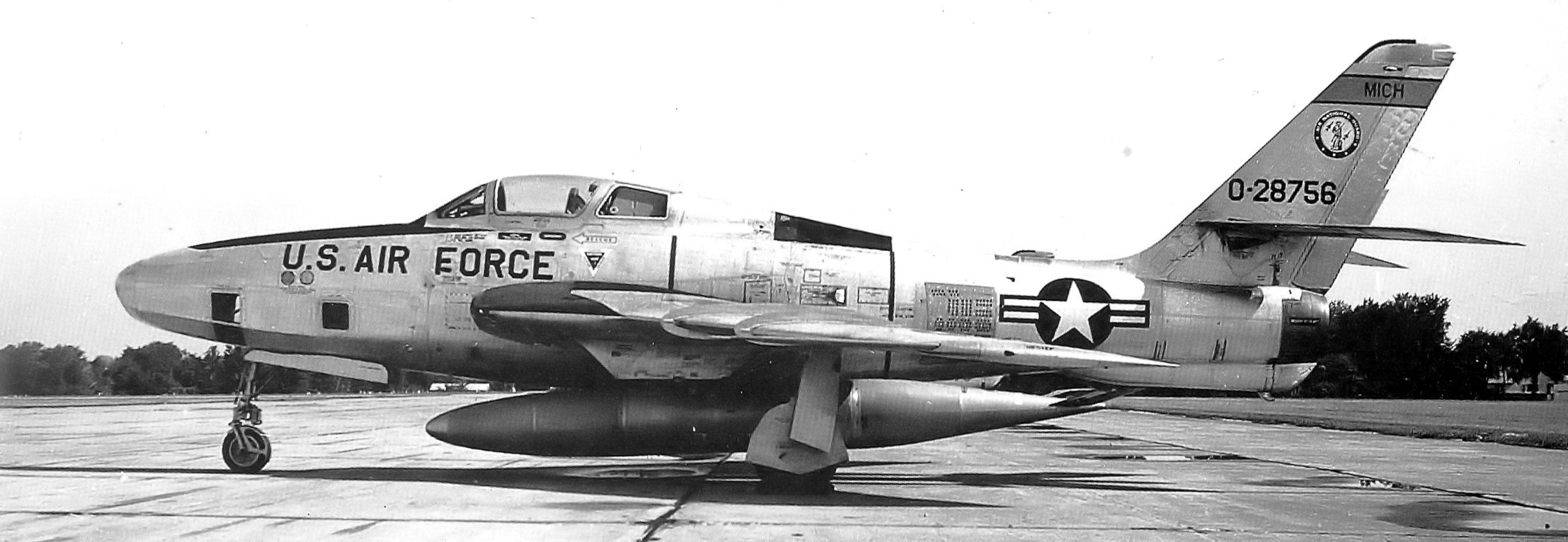
Michigan ANG RF-84F (Note: Aircraft is Republic RF-84F-36-RE Thunderflash, serial 52-8756. This plane was retired 1971 and sold to Taiwan.)

In the fall of 1950, the Air National Guard reorganized under the Wing Base Organization and the group was assigned to the new 127th Fighter Wing, which has remained as its higher headquarters under various designations since then. In February 1951, the wing and group were called to active duty. Unlike other National Guard wings called to active duty for the Korean War, however, the 127th became part of Air Training Command and moved to Luke Air Force Base, Arizona, along with its 107th and 171st Squadrons, (Note: The 172nd transferred to the 128th Fighter-Interceptor Wing of the Wisconsin Air National Guard.) becoming the 127th Pilot Training Group. Seventeen members of the 172nd Squadron had volunteered for duty overseas as members of the regular Air Force the previous month. The 197th Pilot Training Squadron of the Arizona Air National Guard, which was already at Luke, became the group's third squadron. The 197th was equipped with Republic F-84 Thunderjets. The group trained fighter pilots with North American F-51 Mustangs, Lockheed F-80 Shooting Stars and F-84 Thunderjets.

==== Return to the National Guard ====
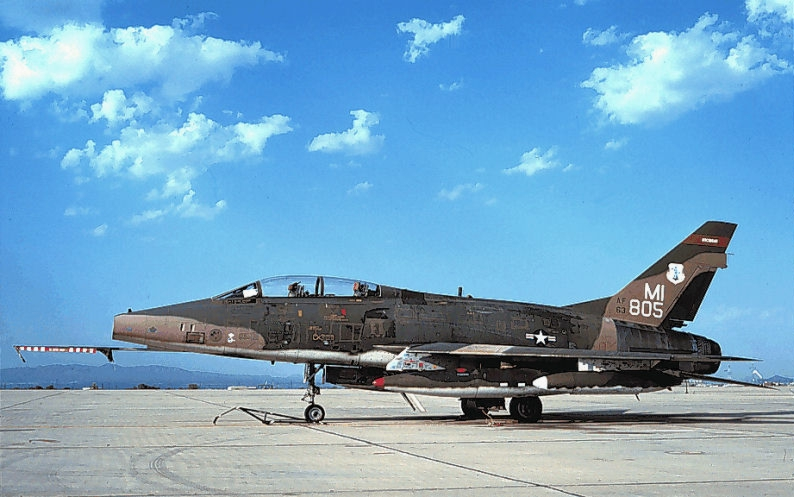
F-100 assigned to the group (Note: Aircraft is North American F-100F-10-NA Super Sabre, serial 56-3805. This aircraft was retired to MASDC as FE0619 on 1 October 1979.)

The 127th was inactivated in November 1952 and returned to the Michigan Guard as the 127th Fighter-Bomber Group, with the 107th and 171st Squadrons assigned. Its equipment, mission, and most of its personnel at Luke were transferred to the newly formed 3600th Flying Training Group. Despite its designation, it focused on the air defense mission. This was recognized in 1955, when the unit became the 127th Fighter-Interceptor Group. When it became the 127th Fighter Group (Air Defense) in April 1956, only the 107th Squadron remained with the group.

In 1958, its mission changed to aerial reconnaissance and it became the 127th Tactical Reconnaissance Group. The 171st Squadron returned to the group, along with the 117th Tactical Reconnaissance Squadron of the Kansas Air National Guard. In 1962, to facilitate mobilization of elements smaller than an entire wing, the 117th and 171st Squadrons were assigned to newly organized groups. (Note: For the response to the same problem with reserve units, see Cantwell, pp. 189-191.) In 1970, the group made the short move to Selfridge Air Force Base. It returned to the fighter mission in 1972, but was inactivated in December 1974, when the Air National Guard eliminated group headquarters that were located on the same base as their parent wings.

As the Air Force implemented the Objective Wing organization in the 1990s, the group was again activated as the 127th Operations Group.

== Lineage ==
- Constituted as the 361st Fighter Group, Single Engine on 28 January 1943

Activated on 10 February 1943
Inactivated on 10 November 1945

- Redesignated 127th Fighter Group, Single Engine and allotted to the National Guard on 24 May 1946

Activated on 9 July 1946
Federally recognized on 29 September 1946

- Called to active duty c. 1 February 1951

Redesignated 127th Pilot Training Group
Inactivated, returned to the National Guard, and redesignated 127th Fighter-Bomber Group on 1 November 1952
Redesignated 127th Fighter-Interceptor Group on 1 July 1955
Redesignated 127th Fighter Group (Air Defense) on 16 April 1956

- Redesignated 127th Tactical Reconnaissance Group on 12 April 1958

Redesignated 127th Tactical Fighter Group on 30 June 1972
Inactivated on 9 December 1974

- Redesignated 127th Operations Group

Activated c. 1 January 1993

=== Assignments ===
- I Fighter Command, 10 February 1943
- Philadelphia Air Defense Wing (later Philadelphia Fighter Wing), 28 August 1943
- VIII Fighter Command, 30 November 1943
- 66th Fighter Wing, 12 December 1943
- 67th Fighter Wing, 11 March 1944
- 100th Fighter Wing, 8 August 1944 (attached to XIX Tactical Air Command for operational control after 24 December 1944)
- 65th Fighter Wing, 1 January 1945 (attached to XIX Tactical Air Command for operational control)
- VIII Fighter Command, 1 February 1945
- 66th Fighter Wing, 10 April 1945
- Army Service Forces, New York Port of Embarkation, 3–10 November 1945
- Michigan National Guard, 9 July 1946
- 66th Fighter Wing, 26 November 1946
- 55th Fighter Wing, 1 August 1948
- 66th Fighter Wing, 1 December 1948
- 127th Fighter Wing (later 127th Pilot Training Wing), 1 November 1950 – 1 November 1952
- 127th Fighter-Bomber Wing (later 127th Fighter-Interceptor Wing, 127th Air Defense Wing, 127th Tactical Reconnaissance Wing, 127th Tactical Fighter Wing), 1 November 1952 – 12 April 1958 – 9 December 1974
- 127th Fighter Wing (later 127th Wing), c. 1 January 1993 – present

=== Components ===
- 107th Bombardment Squadron (later 107th Fighter Squadron, 107th Pilot Training Squadron, 107th Fighter-Bomber Squadron, 107th Fighter-Interceptor Squadron, 107th Tactical Reconnaissance Squadron, 107th Tactical Fighter Squadron, 107th Fighter Squadron), 9 July 1946 – 26 November 1946, 1 July 1950 – 11 September 1952, 1 November 192 – 9 December 1975. c. 1 January 1993 – present
- 117th Tactical Reconnaissance Squadron, c. December 1958 – 1 October 1962
- 127th Operations Support Squadron, c. 1 January 1993 – present
- 169th Fighter Squadron, c. June 1947 – 1 June 1949
- 197th Pilot Training Squadron, February 1951 – 1 November 1952
- 374th Fighter Squadron (later 171st Fighter Squadron, 171st Pilot Training Squadron, 171st Fighter-Bomber Squadron, 171st Fighter-Interceptor Squadron, 171st Tactical Reconnaissance Squadron, 171st Airlift Squadron), 10 February 1943 – 24 October 1945, 13 December 1946 – 1 November 1952, 1 November 1952 – 16 April 1956, c. 1 January 1958 – 1 October 1962, 1 April 1996 – 1 May 1999
- 375th Fighter Squadron (later 172nd Fighter Squadron), 10 February 1943 – 24 October 1945 29 August 1947 – c. 10 February 1951
- 376th Fighter Squadron, 10 February 1943 – 24 October 1945

=== Stations ===
- Richmond Army Air Base, Virginia, 10 February 1943
- Langley Field, Virginia, 26 May 1943
- Millville Army Air Field, New Jersey, 20 July 1943
- Camp Springs Army Air Field, Maryland 28 August 1943
- Richmond Army Air Base, Virginia, 20 September – 11 November 1943
- RAF Bottisham (AAF-374), England, 30 November 1943
- RAF Little Walden (AAF-165), England, 26 September 1944
- Chievres Airfield (A-84), Belgium 1 February 1945
- RAF Little Walden (AAF-165), England, 9 April – 3 November 1945
- Camp Kilmer, New Jersey, 9–10 November 1945
- Wayne County Airport, Michigan, 9 July 1946
- Luke Air Force Base, Arizona, 23 February 1951 – 1 November 1952
- Wayne County Airport, 1 November 1952 – 12 April 1958
- Detroit Air National Guard Base, c. 1 October 1962
- Selfridge Air Force Base, June 1970 – 9 December 1974
- Selfridge Air Force Base (later Selfridge Air National Guard Base). c.1 January 1993 – present

=== Aircraft ===
- Republic P-47 Thunderbolt, 1943–1944
- North American P-51 (later F-51) Mustang, 1944–1945, 1946–1952
- Lockheed F-80 Shooting Star, 1951–1952
- Republic F-84 Thunderjet, 1951–1952
- Republic RF-84F Thunderflash, 1958–1972
- North American F-100 Super Sabre, 1972–1974
