= 127th Air Refueling Group =

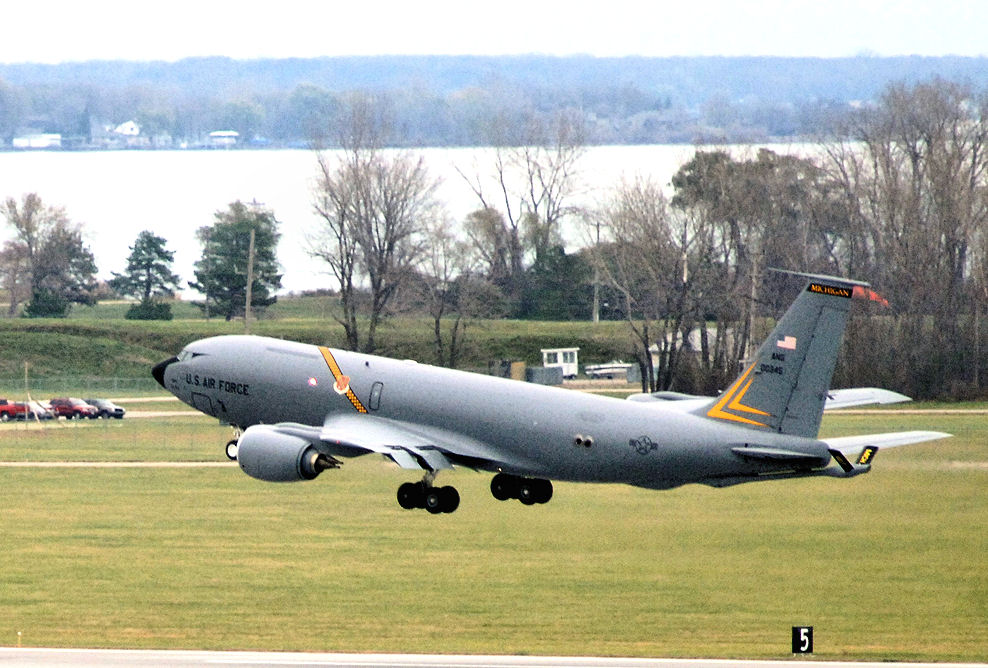
- A KC-135 Stratotanker lifts off at Selfridge Air National Guard Base
- Active: 1962–1996; 1999–present
- Country: USA
- Allegiance: United States; Michigan
- Branch: United States Air Force; Air National Guard
- Role: Air refueling
- Size: Group
- Part of: Air Mobility Command; Michigan Air National Guard
- Garrison/HQ: Selfridge ANGB, Michigan
- Motto: We stand ready

Insignia
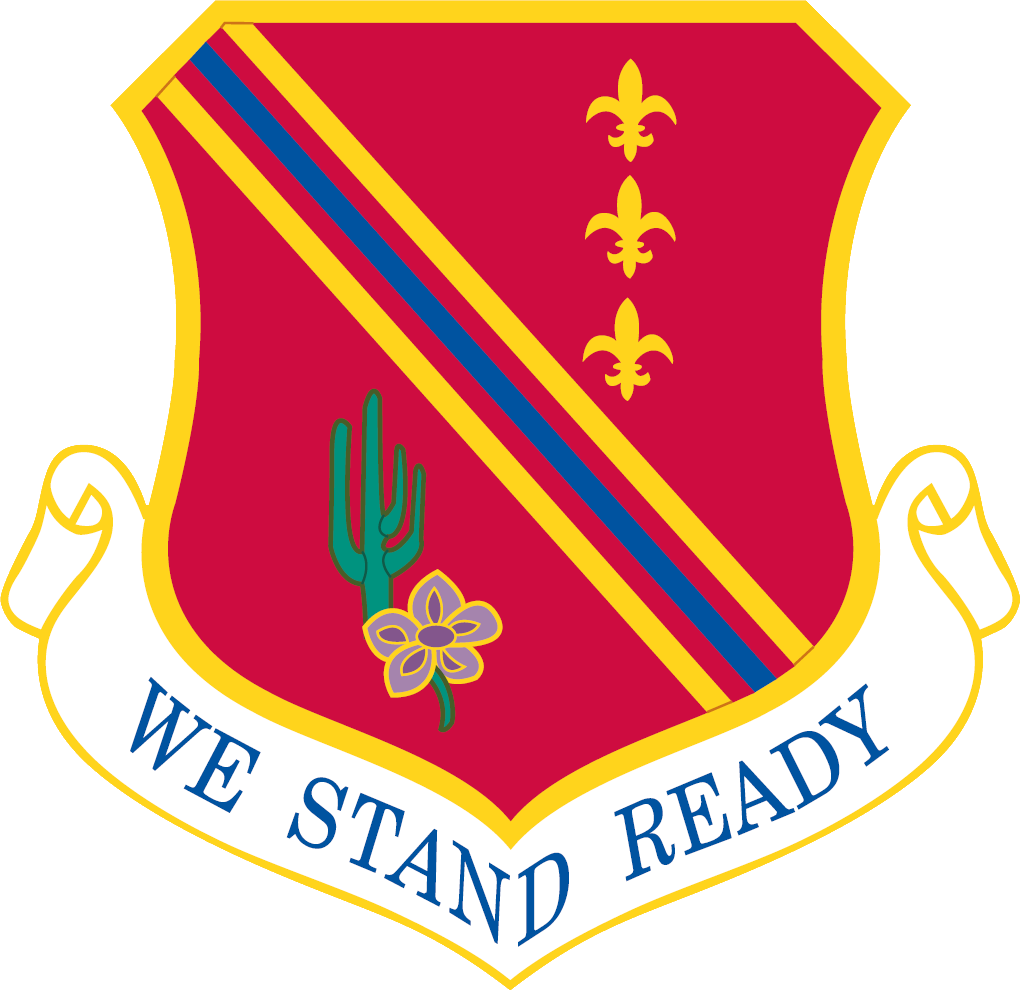
- 127th Air Refueling Group emblem (Note: While assigned to the 127th Wing, the group uses the wing emblem with the group designation on the scroll. AF Instruction 84-105, Organizational Lineage, Honors and History, 27 April 2017, paragraph 3.3.3)

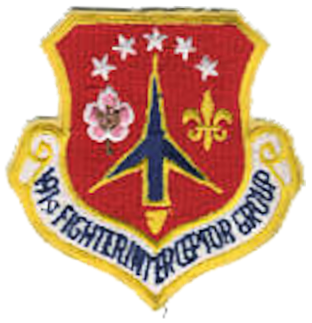
- 191st Fighter Interceptor Group emblem
- Tail stripe: Black with "Michigan" in yellow

Aircraft flown
- Tanker: KC-135 Stratotanker

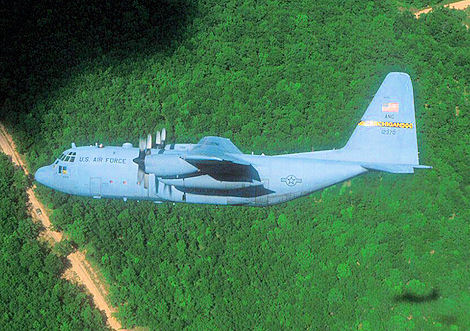
171st Airlift Group C-130 Hercules

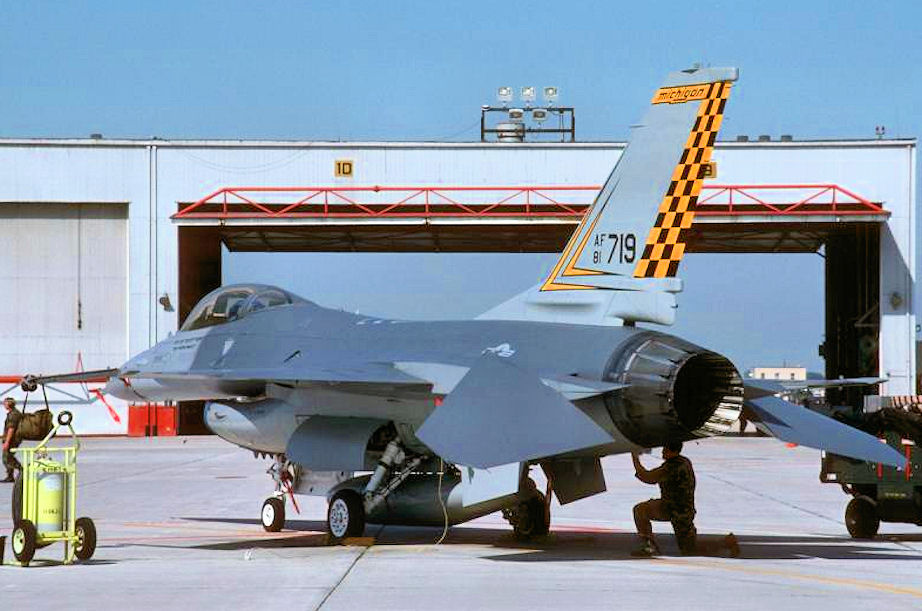
191st Fighter Group F-16A interceptor, 1991

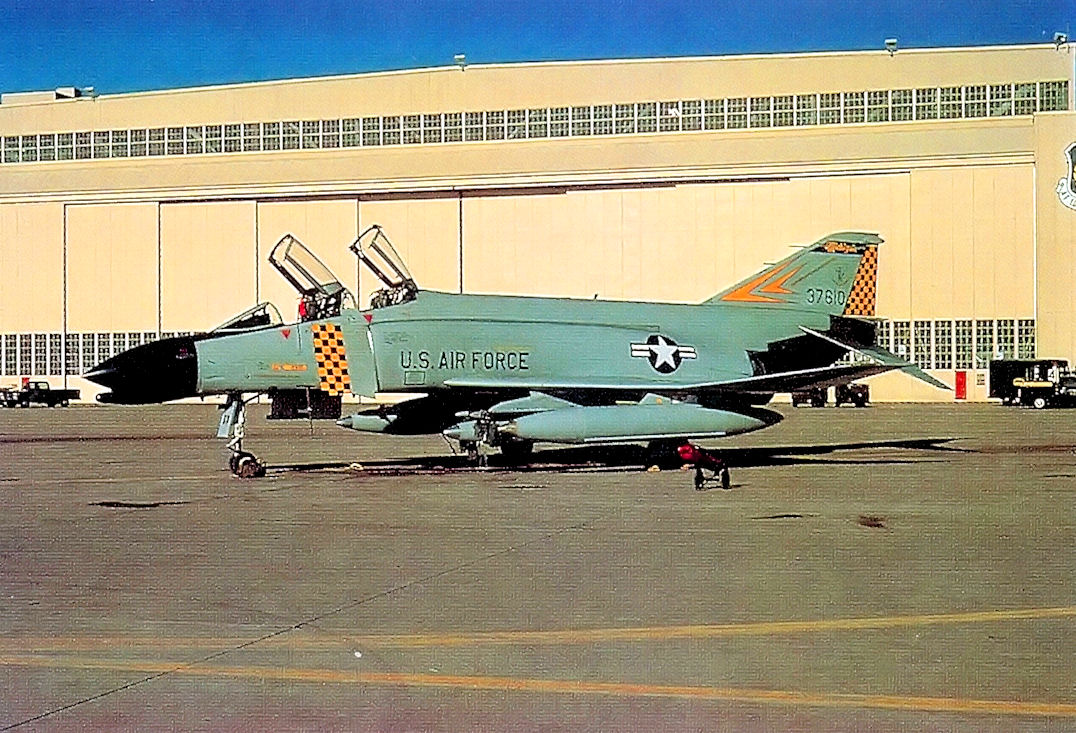
F-4C in ADCOM interceptor liverly, 1980

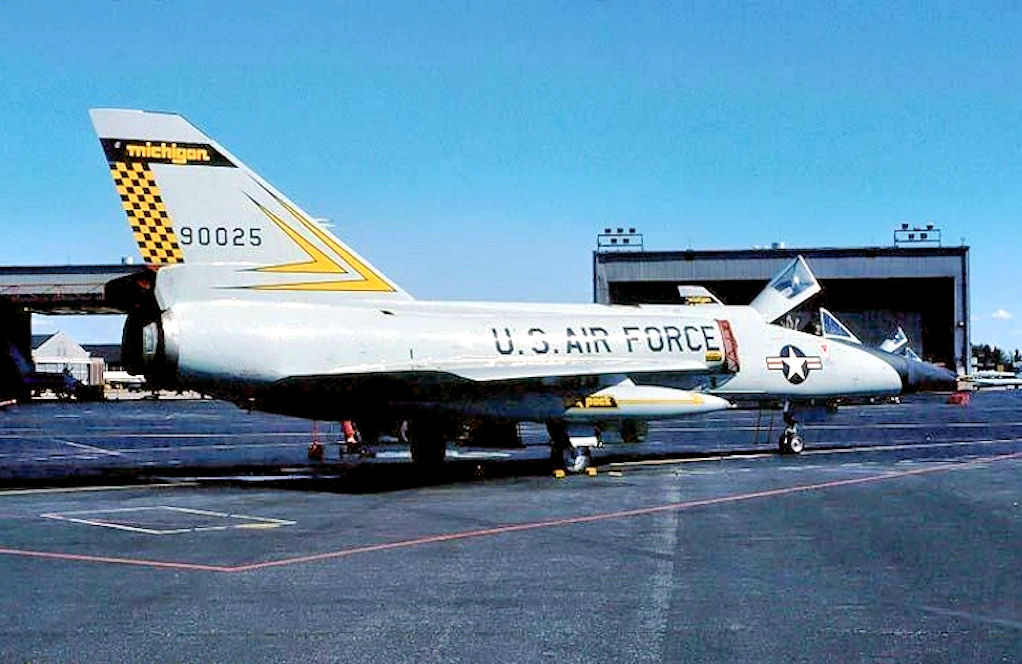
191st Fighter-Interceptor Group F-106 Delta Dart, 1975

The 127th Air Refueling Group is a unit of the Michigan Air National Guard, assigned to the 127th Wing, Selfridge Air National Guard Base, Michigan.

== History ==
Established in 1962 when the Michigan ANG 171st Tactical Reconnaissance Squadron was expanded to a Group. Was primarily a training unit flying second-line RF-84F Thundersteak reconnaissance aircraft for Tactical Air Command, upgrading to the newer RF-101 Voodoo in 1971.

Reassigned to Aerospace Defense Command (ADCOM) in 1973, equipped with F-106 Delta Dart interceptors. Performed air defense duties of the Great Lakes and Detroit area until 1978 when ADCOM was merged into Tactical Air Command. Continued air defense mission for ADTAC component of TAC with F-4 Phantom IIs, transferring to First Air Force when ADTAC was replaced in 1985. Upgraded to F-16A Fighting Falcons in 1990.

Transferred to Air Mobility Command in 1993 when the group became a C-130 Hercules Tactical Airlift unit. Inactivated in April 1996 when the 127th Fighter Wing and 191st Airlift Group were merged due to the One-Base, One Wing policy. Reactivated in May 1999 as a group under the 127th Wing, operating the C-130 airlift element of the composite wing.

Inactivated in September 2007 with the realignment of Selfridge and transfer of the C-130s and the transition to the KC-135 Stratotanker due to BRAC 2005. The 191st Group was inactivated, however the 191st Operation Support Flight, 191st Maintenance Squadron, 191st Aircraft Maintenance Squadron, 191st Maintenance Operations Flight and the 171st Air Refueling Squadron were reassigned to the 127th Air Refueling Group, 127th Wing.

On January 11, 2024, it was announced that the group would be transitioning over to the new KC-46A Pegasus, possibly in 2028. The group of 12 aircraft would replace the eight that are currently a part of the wing.

== Lineage ==
- Established as the 191st Tactical Reconnaissance Group on 11 September 1962 and allotted to the Air National Guard

Activated on 1 October 1962
Redesignated 191st Fighter-Interceptor Group c. 21 July 1972
Redesignated 191st Fighter Group on 15 March 1992
Redesignated 191st Airlift Group on 15 July 1994
Inactivated on 1 April 1996

- Activated on 1 May 1999

Redesignated 127th Air Refueling Group, 30 September 2007,

=== Assignments ===
- 127th Tactical Reconnaissance Wing, 1 October 1962
- 835th Air Division, 1 July 1967
- 127th Tactical Reconnaissance Wing, 1967
- 102nd Fighter-Interceptor Wing, c. 21 Jul 1972
- 144th Fighter-Interceptor Wing
- 127th Wing, 15 March 1992 – 1 April 1996
- 127th Wing, 1 May 1999 – present

Michigan Air National Guard, 1 Oct 1962 – 1 April 1996

Gained by Tactical Air Command, 1 October 1962
Gained by Aerospace Defense Command, c. 21 July 1972
Gained by Tactical Air Command, 1 June 1978
Gained by Air Combat Command, 1 June 1992
Gained by Air Mobility Command, 1 October 1993

=== Components ===
- 171st Tactical Reconnaissance (later Fighter-Interceptor, later Tactical Fighter, Later Fighter, Later Airlift) Squadron, 1 October 1962 – 1 April 1996; 1 May 1999 – 30 September 2007

=== Stations ===
- Detroit Wayne County Metropolitan Airport, Michigan, 1 October 1962
- Selfridge Air National Guard Base (prev. Selfridge Air Force Base, Michigan, 1 July 1971 – 1 April 1996; 1 May 1999 – 30 September 2007)

=== Aircraft ===
- RF-84F Thunderstreak, 1962–1971
- RF-101C Voodoo, 1971–1972
- F-106 Delta Dart, 1972–1978
- F-4C Phantom II, 1978–1986
- F-4D Phantom II, 1986–1990
- F-16A Fighting Falcon, 1990
- C-130 Hercules, 1993–1996; 1999–2007
- KC-135 Stratotanker, 2007–Present
- KC-46A Pegasus - future
