= 127th Wing =

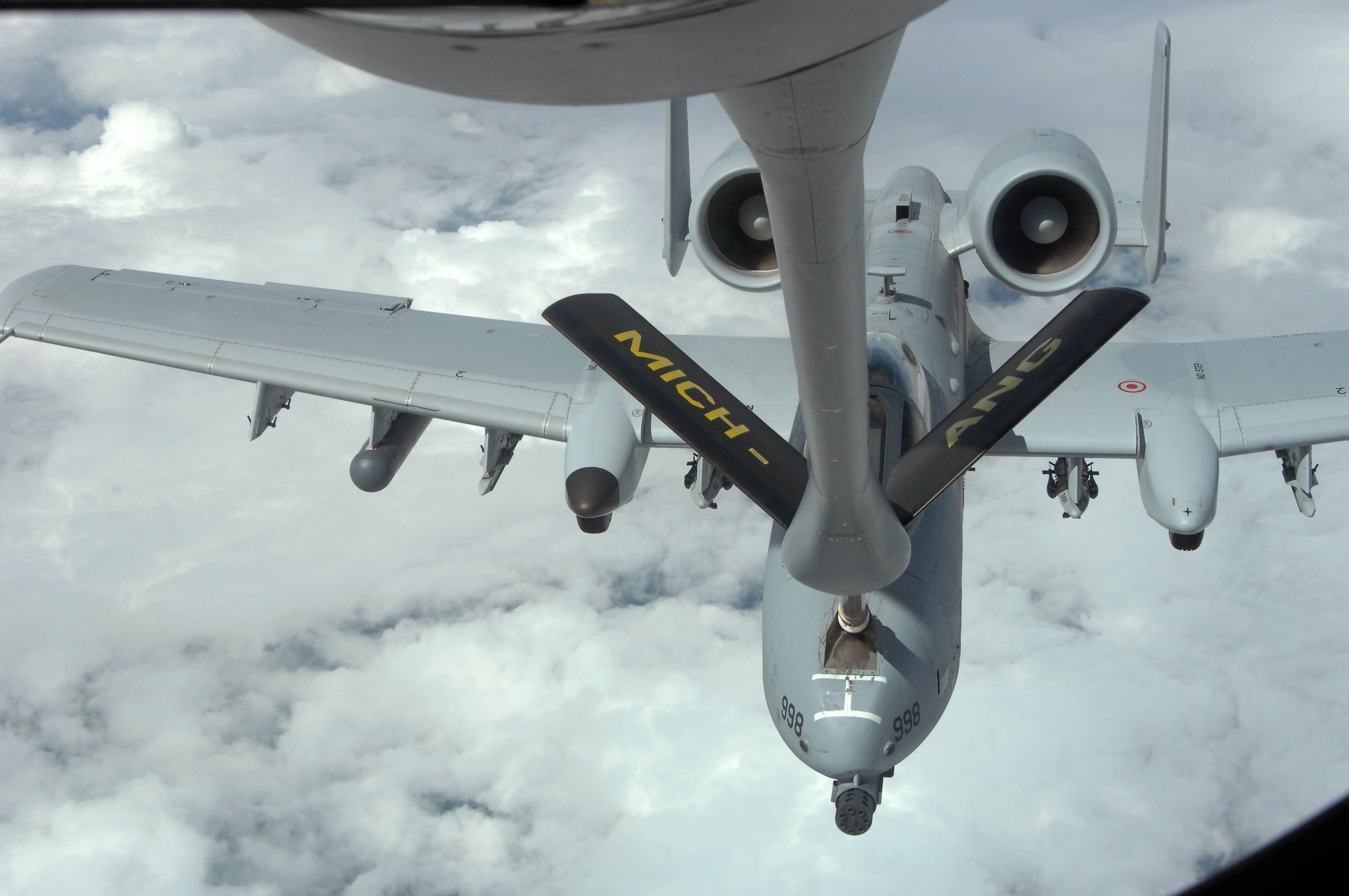
- An A-10 Thunderbolt II refueling from a KC-135 Stratotanker near the border between Latvia and Estonia
- Active: 1950–1952; 1952–present
- Country: United States
- Branch: United States Air Force
- Role: Fighter and air refueling
- Part of: Michigan Air National Guard
- Garrison/HQ: Selfridge ANGB
- Motto: We Stand Ready (Note: Originally approved on 30 July 1954 in Latin as Parati Stamus. Maurer, Combat Units, pp. 243-244)
- Decorations: Air Force Outstanding Unit Award

Insignia
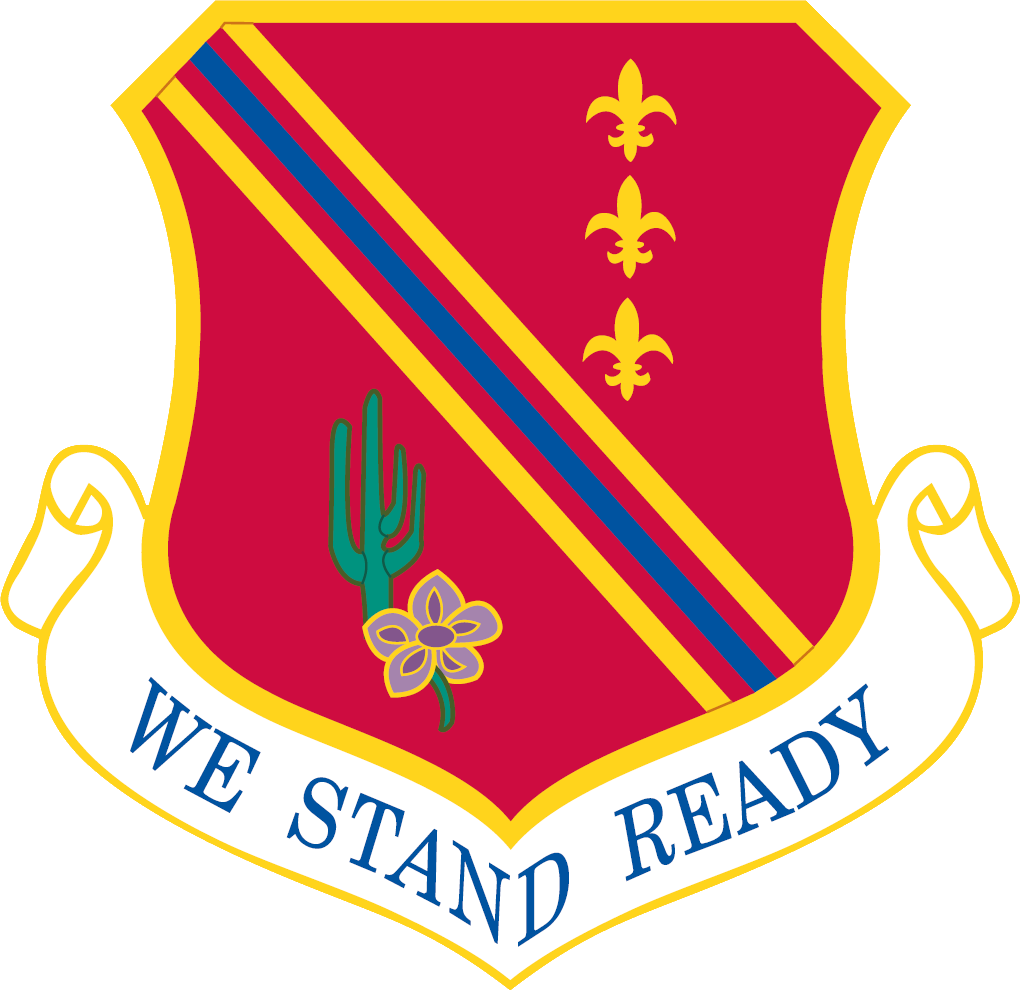
- 127th Wing emblem (Note: Approved 30 July 1954.)

Aircraft flown
- Attack: Fairchild Republic A-10 Thunderbolt II
- Tanker: Boeing KC-135 Stratotanker

The 127th Wing is a composite wing of the United States Air Force, Air National Guard and Michigan National Guard. It comprises approximately 1,400 citizen airmen and provides highly trained personnel, aircraft, and support resources to serve the Michigan community, the state and the United States. The Wing operates Boeing KC-135 Stratotankers, providing global aerial refueling capability supporting Air Mobility Command and the Fairchild Republic A-10 Thunderbolt II, flying the close-air support mission for Air Combat Command. The current commander of the 127th Wing is Brig. Gen. Leah Voelker. The 127th Wing's is host unit of Selfridge Air National Guard Base, the largest facility managed by a reserve component (Air National Guard or U.S. Air Force Reserve) of the U.S. Air Force.

== History ==
In the fall of 1950, the Air National Guard reorganized its tactical units according to the United States Air Force's Wing Base Organization, which combined tactical and support units under a single wing. On 1 November 1950, the 127th Fighter Wing was activated with the 127th Fighter, Air Base, Maintenance & Supply, and Medical Groups assigned.

In February 1951, the wing and groups were called to active duty. Unlike other Air National Guard wings called to active duty for the Korean War, the 127th became part of Air Training Command and moved to Luke Air Force Base, Arizona, becoming the 127th Pilot Training Wing. Seventeen members of the wing's 172nd Squadron had already volunteered for duty overseas as members of the regular Air Force the previous month. The 197th Pilot Training Squadron of the Arizona Air National Guard, already at Luke, equipped with Republic F-84 Thunderjets, joined the wing. The wing trained fighter pilots with North American F-51 Mustangs, Lockheed F-80 Shooting Stars and Republic F-84 Thunderjets. On 1 November 1952, the wing was inactivated and returned to the Air National Guard as the 127th Fighter-Bomber Wing, transferring its equipment and most of its personnel at Luke to the newly formed 3600th Flying Training Wing.

In April 1962, Volunteer pilots and ground support personnel from the wing's 172nd Tactical Reconnaissance Squadron began training at Kirtland Air Force Base, New Mexico, for Operation Blue Straw, nuclear tests conducted at Christmas Island in the middle of the Pacific Ocean. Flying specially equipped Martin RB-57 Canberras, their pilots flew through nuclear dust clouds to gather samples for study.

In July 1967, over 80 per cent of the Michigan Air Guard's personnel were ordered on active duty to help deal with massive rioting, looting, and arson in Detroit. They guarded utility installations, rode with police and firefighters, guarded prisoners, and secured a base at the Detroit Metropolitan Airport. The 110th Tactical Reconnaissance Group was activated, and the unit's Air Police contingent was flown to the city. Its RB-57s flew over damaged parts of the city, producing over 9,000 photos. By July 30, all unit personnel but the Air Police had been demobilized.

Prompted by a disastrous tornado in Lubbock, Texas, in 1970, the National Guard Bureau set up a pilot program for nationwide civil defense tornado aerial photographic assessment and assigned the mission to the wing's 110th Tactical Reconnaissance Group.

In September 1994, Air National Guard Lockheed C-130 Hercules units, including the wing's 191st Airlift Group units, began supporting Operation Provide Comfort, providing humanitarian relief for Kurdish refugees displaced in Iraq from Incirlik Air Base, Turkey.

The wing also supported the Air Force Special Operations Command with its 107th Weather Flight (inactivated by 30 September 2017).

In 2022, the squadron made national headlines when it became the first Air Force squadron to demonstrate that military aircraft could use modern highways as temporary airstrips. It was the first time integrated combat turns had been executed on a public highway in the United States.

From July 2023 to November 2023, the 127th Air Refueling Group was deployed in support of U.S. Central Command.

It was announced on January 11, 2024 that the Air Refueling Group will be moving over from the KC-135 Stratotanker to the KC-46A Pegasus, due to arrive in possibly 2028. These 12 will replace the current 8 that are assigned to the group.

On April 29th, 2025 it was announced during a base visit by President Donald Trump that the existing A-10's would be replaced with the new F-15EX. 21 of these jets will be delivered in fiscal 2028.

== Units ==
The 127th Wing consists of the following major units:

- 127th Operations Group
  - 107th Fighter Squadron (A-10C Thunderbolt II)
- 127th Air Refueling Group
  - 171st Air Refueling Squadron (KC-135T)
- 127th Maintenance Group
  - 127th Maintenance Squadron
- 127th Mission Support Group
- 127th Medical Group

== Lineage ==
- Constituted c. 25 October 1950 as the 127th Fighter Wing and allotted to the Air National Guard

Activated on 1 November 1950

- Called to active duty c. 1 February 1951

Redesignated 127th Pilot Training Wing on 10 February 1951
Inactivated on 1 November 1952 and returned to the Air National Guard

- Redesignated 127th Fighter-Bomber Wing and activated on 1 November 1952

Redesignated 127th Fighter-Interceptor Wing on 1 July 1955
Redesignated 127th Air Defense Wing on 16 April 1956
Redesignated 127th Tactical Reconnaissance Wing on 12 April 1958
Redesignated 127th Tactical Fighter Wing on 30 June 1972
Redesignated 127th Fighter Wing on 31 March 1992
Redesignated 127th Wing c. 1 January 1993

== Assignments ==
- Michigan Air National Guard, 1 November 1950
- Tenth Air Force, c. 1 February 1951
- Air Training Command, 10 February 1951
- Flying Training Air Force, 1 May 1951
- Crew Training Air Force, 1 March – 1 November 1952
- Michigan Air National Guard, 1 November 1952 – present

== Components ==
Groups

- 103d Tactical Fighter Group, c. 30 June 1972 – unknown
- 110th Fighter Group (Air Defense) (later 110th Tactical Reconnaissance Group), 15 April 1956 – 11 June 1972
- 112th Tactical Fighter Group, c. 12 April 1975 – c.16 October 1991
- 127th Fighter Group (later 127th Pilot Training Group, 127th Fighter-Bomber Group, 127th Fighter-Interceptor Group, 127th Fighter Group (Air Defense), 127th Tactical Reconnaissance Group, 127th Tactical Fighter Group, 127th Operations Group), 1 November 1950 – 1 November 1952, 1Noovember 1952 – 9 December 1974, c. 1 January 1993 – present
- 127th Air Base Group, 1 November 1950 – 1 November 1952, 1 November 1952 – 15 April 1956, 12 April 1958 – 1 October 1962
- 127th Combat Support Group (later 127th Combat Support Squadron, 127th Mission Support Squadron, 127th Support Group, 127th Mission Support Group), 9 December 1974 – present
- 127th Maintenance & Supply Group (later 127th Logistics Group, 127th Maintenance Group), 1 November 1950 – 1 November 1952, 1 November 1952 – 15 April 1956, 12 April 1958 – c. 1 December 1959, c. 1 January 1993 – present
- 127th Medical Group (later 127th Tactical Hospital, 127th USAF Dispensary, 127th Tactical Clinic, 127th Medical Squadron, 127th Medical Group), 1 November 1950 – 1 November 1952, 1 November 1952 – present
- 155th Tactical Reconnaissance Group, c. 1 May 1964 – c. 1 June 1972
- 169th Tactical Fighter Group (later 169th Fighter Group), 5 April 1975 – c. 16 October 1995
- 188th Tactical Reconnaissance Group, c. August 1965 – 15 June 1972
- 191st Tactical Reconnaissance Group (later 191st Fighter Group, 191st Airlift Group, 127th Air Refueling Group), 1 October 1962 – 1 July 1967, 1968 – c. 21 July 1972, 15 March 1992 – 1 April 1996, 1 May 1999 – present

Operational squadrons

- 107th Tactical Fighter Squadron (later 107th Fighter Squadron), 9 December 1974 – c. 1 December 1993
- 171st Fighter-Interceptor Squadron, 15 April 1956 – c. 1 January 1958

== Stations ==
- Wayne County Airport, 1 November 1950
- Luke Air Force Base, Arizona, 23 February 1951 – I November 1952
- Wayne County Airport (later Detroit Air National Guard Base), 1 November 1952
- Selfridge Air Force Base (later Selfridge Air National Guard Base), c. 1 January 1993

== Awards ==
Award streamer	Award	Dates	Notes
	Air Force Outstanding Unit Award	1 January 1983 – 31 December 1984	127th Tactical Fighter Wing
