= 107th Fighter Squadron =

Michigan Air National Guard unit

Coordinates: 42°37′36.5″N 82°50′41.6″W

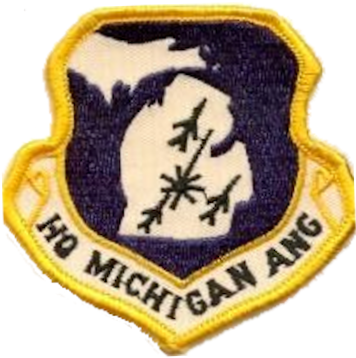
107th Fighter Squadron

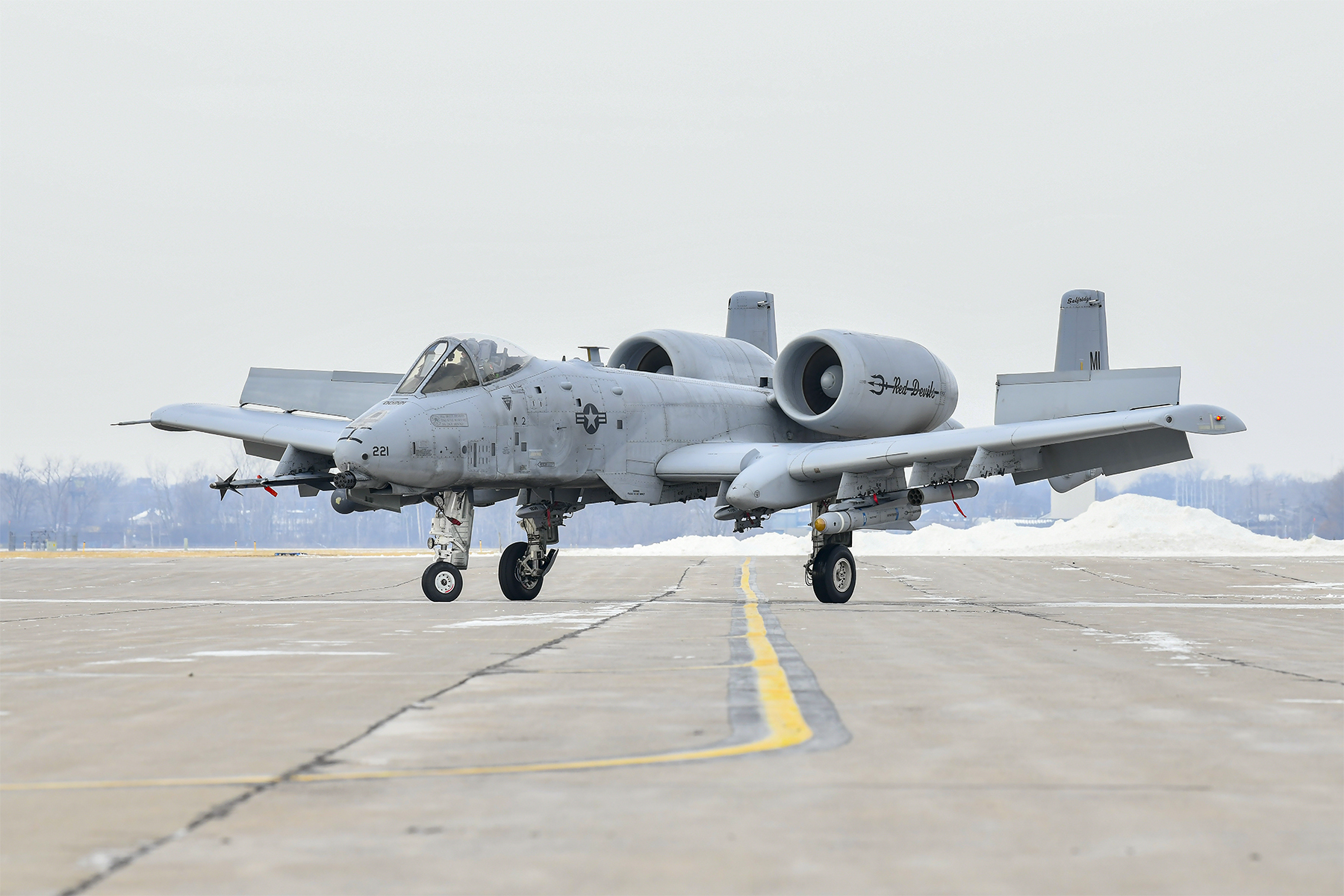
- A 107th Fighter Squadron A-10 Thunderbolt II returns to Selfridge Air National Guard Base after a local training mission
- Active: 1917–1919; 1926–1945; 1946–1952; 1952–present
- Country: United States
- Allegiance: Michigan
- Branch: United States Air Force; Air National Guard
- Type: Squadron
- Role: Close air support
- Part of: Michigan Air National Guard
- Garrison/HQ: Selfridge Air National Guard Base, Michigan
- Nickname: The Red Devils
- Mottos: Videre Est Scire (Latin for 'To See is to Know') (1954),Mors Hostibus (Latin for 'Death to the Enemy')
- Engagements: European Theater of Operations; Korean War; Operation Desert Storm; Operation Northern Watch; Operation Southern Watch; Operation Iraqi Freedom; Operation Epic Fury
- Decorations: Distinguished Unit Citation; Air Force Outstanding Unit Award Belgian Fourragère

Commanders
- Current commander: Lt. Col. Andy Axe
- Wing Command Chief: Chief Master Sgt. Richard D. Gordon

Insignia
- 107th Fighter Squadron emblem (Note: Approved 16 September 1954.)

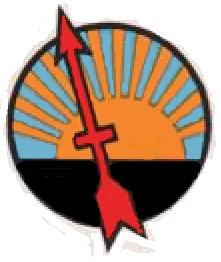
- 107th Observation Squadron emblem
- Tail code: MI
- F-16 Tail Stripe

- A-10 Tail stripe

The 107th Fighter Squadron is a unit of the Michigan Air National Guard 127th Wing. It is assigned to Selfridge Air National Guard Base, Michigan and is equipped with the Fairchild Republic A-10 Thunderbolt II aircraft.

The squadron is a descendant organization of the World War I 107th Aero Squadron, established on 27 August 1917. It was reformed on 7 May 1926, as the 107th Observation Squadron, and is one of the 29 original National Guard Observation Squadrons of the United States Army National Guard formed before World War II.

== History ==
=== World War I ===
The 107th Fighter Squadron traces its origins to 26 August 1917 with the organization of the 107th Aero Squadron. Forty recruits arrived at Kelly Field, San Antonio, Texas from Vancouver Barracks, Washington. An additional 341 recruits arrived from Fort Thomas, Kentucky, and formed as the 107th. The squadron was initially indoctrinated into military service, performing drill, fatigue duties and also construction work at the field. Once basic indoctrination training was completed, the 107th was ordered for overseas duty, being ordered to report to the Aviation Concentration Center, Garden City, New York on 26 October. It was there that final arrangements were made for the trip overseas, complete equipment was drawn and a final few transfers were made.

On 7 December, the 107th was ordered to proceed by train to St. John's, Newfoundland. On 10 December it boarded the SS Tuscania (1914) for the cross-Atlantic voyage, arriving on Christmas morning at Liverpool, England. After a brief rest, the squadron arrived at Southampton, England on the 29th, and crossed the English Channel to Le Havre, France. There, it then traveled by train to the Replacement Concentration Center, American Expeditionary Forces, St. Maixent Replacement Barracks, France, arriving on 2 January 1918. At St. Maixent the squadron was redesignated as the 801st Aero Squadron, and placed on camp duty for nearly two months. Finally, it was ordered to proceed to the Third Aviation Instruction Center at Issoudun Aerodrome, in central France, arriving on 21 February. Initially the squadron was assigned to the main airfield, working in the aircraft assembly and test departments. On 7 June, help was needed at Field No. 2, and the 801st was ordered to send 100 men to help put the field in better shape. Cooperating with another squadron, Field No. 2 was placed on an efficient basis as any field in the AEF.

The squadron remained at Issoudun until after the Armistice with Germany in November 1918, then returned to the United States in March 1919. Arrived at Mitchel Field where the squadron members were demobilized and returned to civilian life. (Note: Maurer and Clay both say Gardem City was the demobilization location. Maurer, Combat Squadrons, p. 336, Clay, p. 1446. There were several installations there, including Fort Mills, Kindley Field and Hazelhurst Field in addition to Mitchel.)

=== Intra-war period ===
After the war the squadron was reorganized in 1925 as the Michigan National Guard's first flying unit, the squadron consisted of 20 officers and 90 enlisted men meeting weekly in a Detroit garage. It received Federal recognition in May 1926 as the air section of the Michigan National Guard's 32d Division. Its primary mission was artillery spotting and observation of troop movements.

In March 1938, elements of the 107th Observation Squadron performed gunnery training at Eglin Field, Florida, for 15 days, deploying from Wayne County Airport at Detroit, Michigan. 23 officers and 111 men arrived on 1 March. One detachment flew in eight aircraft while the rest arrived by rail over the Louisville and Nashville Railroad at Crestview, Florida.

=== World War II ===
Called to active duty with Douglas O-38 and North American O-47 observation planes on 15 October 1940, the 107th was sent to DeRidder Army Air Base, Louisiana for unit training on 28 October 1940. For many years this airfield was simply called the Artillery Range Airport Camp.

On 11 April 1941, Lieutenant Wilmer Esler was killed in the crash of his O-47 when it experienced an engine failure on takeoff. The War Department announced on 19 June 1941 that the Air Corps field at Camp Beauregard would be named Esler Field in honor of his sacrifice.

In 1941, the 107th was joined by two other National Guard observation units to form the 67th Observation Group. The 67th Group did anti-submarine patrolling off the East Coast of the US from mid-December 1941 to March 1942, when it returned to Louisiana for training in fighter aircraft.

The 67th Group was sent to RAF Membury, England, in August 1942 and flew Supermarine Spitfire Mk. Vs and De Havilland Tiger Moths for a year until equipped with North American F-6 Mustangs. Pre-invasion missions began in December 1943. For successful photo missions of the French invasion coastline without loss of a single aircraft, the 107th was awarded the Presidential Unit Citation on 7 April 1945. The 67th Group advance detachments landed in Normandy 13 days after D-Day. The Belgian Fourragere was awarded for conspicuous action during the Battle of the Bulge.

In June 2018, A-10s from the 107th flew over Normandy Beach as part of anniversary observances of D-Day. It was the first official mission for the 107th over Normandy since the end of World War II.

=== Michigan Air National Guard ===
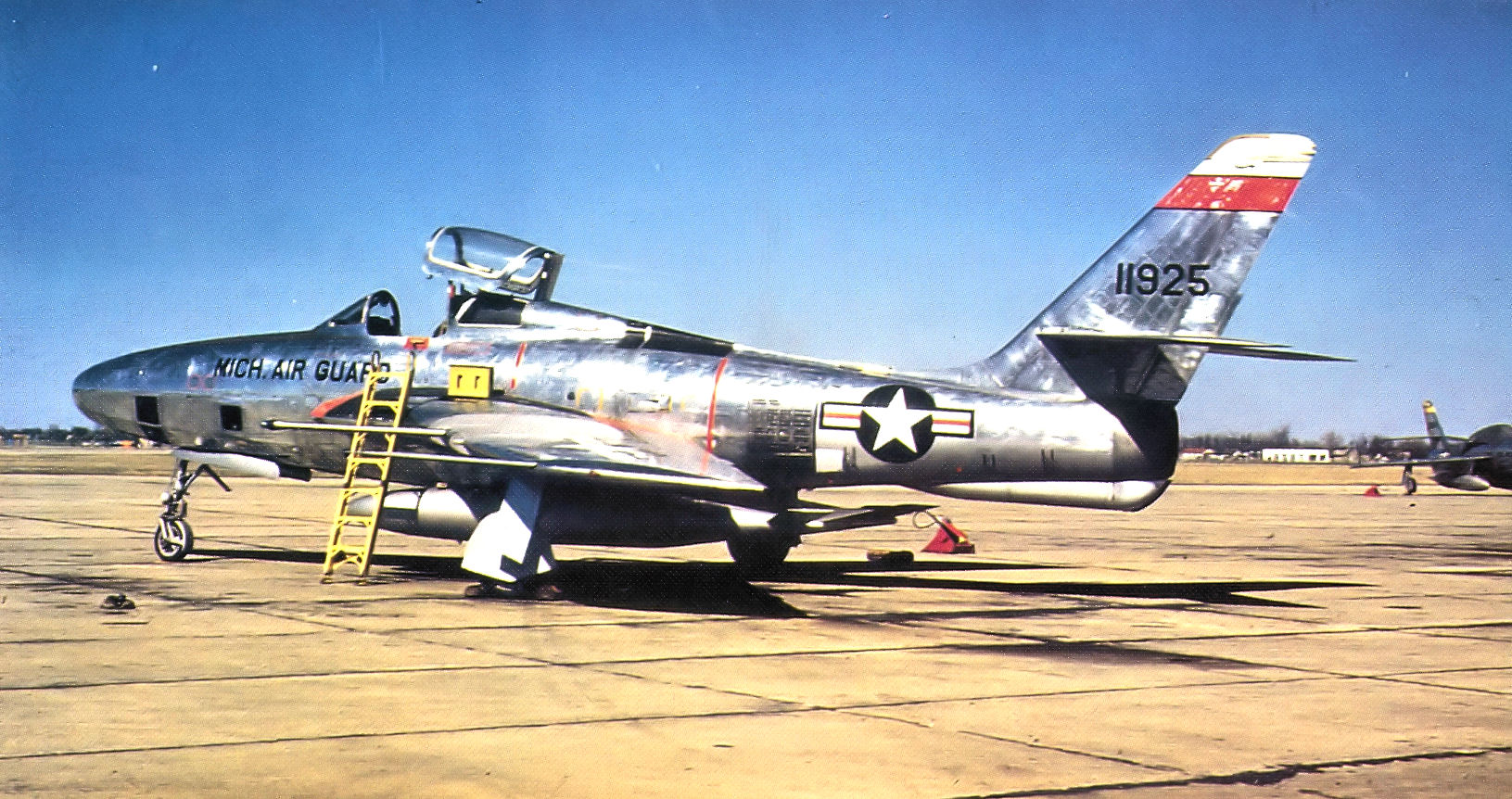
107th Tactical Reconnaissance Squadron RF-84F (Note: Aircraft is Republic RF-84F Thunderstreak serial 51-1925, about 1960.)

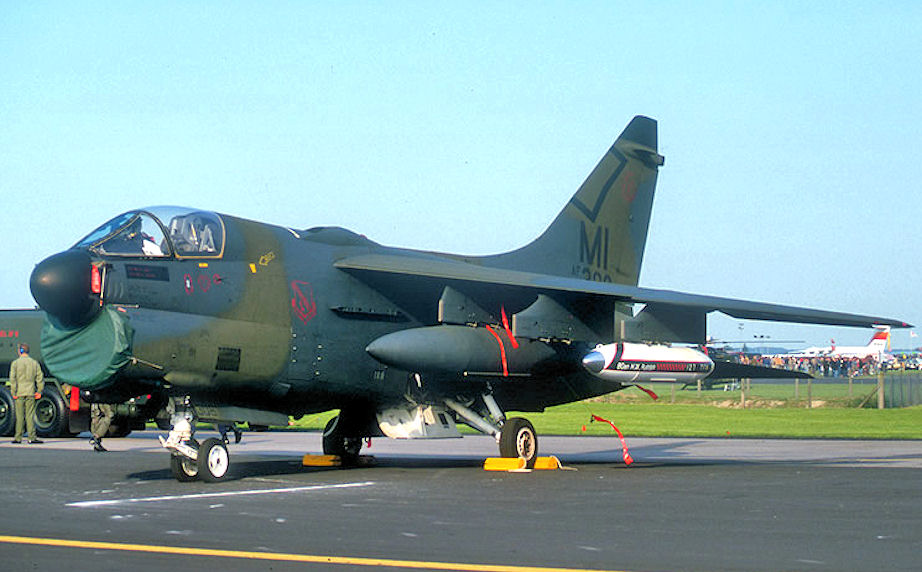
A-7D of the 107th Tactical Fighter Squadron about 1989

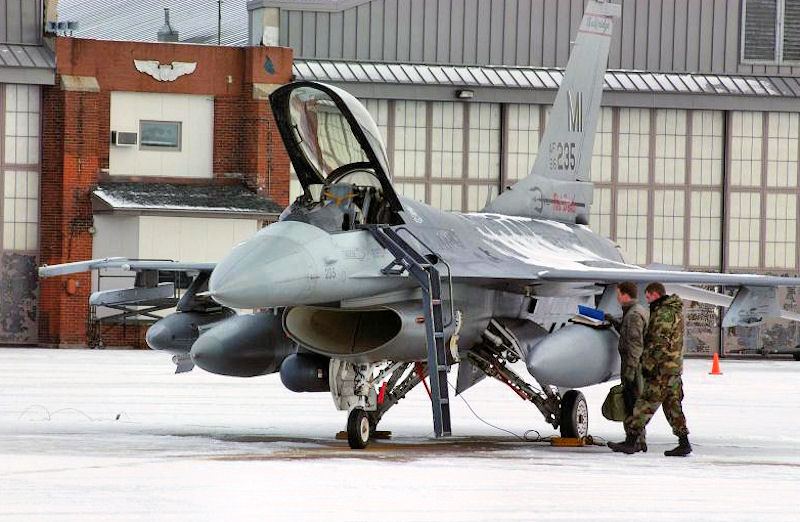
107th Fighter Squadron F-16C (Note: Aircraft is General Dynamics F-16C Block 30 serial 86–0235 at Selfridge ANGB with the pilot and crew chief right going over the forms during preparations to deploy on 24 February 2004.)

The wartime 107th Tactical Reconnaissance Squadron was redesignated as the 107th Bombardment Squadron (Light), and was allotted to the National Guard on 24 May 1946. It was organized at Wayne County Airport, Michigan on 9 June 1946 and was extended federal recognition in September. It was assigned to the newly organized Michigan National Guard's 127th Fighter Group. The squadron was equipped with F-51H Mustang.

In 1950, the unit was converted to Republic F-84B Thunderjet jets and on 1 February 1951, the unit was activated as part of the 127th Pilot Training Group and moved to Luke Air Force Base, Arizona. The 107th was inactivated and returned to Michigan in November 1952.

F-16s from the 107th Fighter Squadron deployed to Kirkuk Air Base in February 2004 to replace the 354th Fighter Squadron. The 107th became the first General Dynamics F-16 Fighting Falcon unit to be based in Iraq. The unit returned home in early June 2004.

As a result of the 2005 Base Realignment and Closure decision, the 107th converted from the F-16 to the Fairchild Republic A-10 Thunderbolt II. The 107th flew its last sortie with F-16s on 16 December 2008. The three remaining F-16s on the base were scheduled to be transferred to Fort Wayne Air National Guard Station, Indiana, and twenty-four A-10s are scheduled to arrive at Selfridge in May 2009.

On 29 April 2025, it was announced during a base visit by President Donald Trump that the existing A-10's would be replaced with the new F-15EX platform. 21 of these jets will be delivered in fiscal 2028.

== Lineage ==
107th Aero Squadron

- Organized as the 107th Aero Squadron on 27 August 1917 (Note: This unit is not related to the 107th Aero Squadron that was activated in March 1918 at Rich Field, Texas, moved the same month to Carlstrom Field, Florida, redesignated Squadron A, Carlstrom Field in July 1918 and demobilized in November 1918, with its personnel and equipment being transferred to the Flying School Detachment, Carlstrom Field.)

Redesignated: 801st Aero Squadron on 1 February 1918
Redesignated: 801st Aero Squadron (Repair) on 21 February 1918
Demobilized on 18 March 1919

- Reconstituted and consolidated with the 107th Observation Squadron as the 107th Observation Squadron on 20 October 1936

107th Fighter Squadron

- Constituted as the 107th Squadron (Observation) and allotted to the Michigan National Guard in 1921

Redesignated 107th Observation Squadron on 25 January 1923
Organized and federally recognized on 7 May 1926

- Consolidated with the 801st Aero Squadron on 20 October 1936

Ordered to active service on 15 October 1940
Redesignated 107th Observation Squadron (Light) on 13 January 1942
Redesignated 107th Observation Squadron on 4 July 1942
Redesignated 107th Reconnaissance Squadron (Fighter) on 31 May 1943
Redesignated 107th Tactical Reconnaissance Squadron on 13 November 1943
Inactivated on 9 November 1945

- Redesignated 107th Bombardment Squadron (Light) and allotted to the National Guard on 24 May 1946

Activated on 9 July 1946
Federally recognized 26 September 1946
Redesignated 107th Fighter Squadron, Jet on 1 July 1950
Ordered into active service on 1 February 1951
Redesignated 107th Pilot Training Squadron on 1 February 1951
Inactivated, relieved from active duty and returned to the National Guard on 1 November 1952

- Redesignated 107th Fighter-Bomber Squadron and activated in the Michigan Air National Guard on 1 November 1952

Redesignated 107th Fighter-Interceptor Squadron on 1 July 1955
Redesignated 107th Tactical Reconnaissance Squadron, Photo-Jet on 12 April 1958
Redesignated 107th Tactical Fighter Squadron on 30 June 1972
Redesignated 107th Fighter Squadron on 31 March 1992

=== Assignments ===
- Post Headquarters, Kelly Field, 27 August 1917
- Aviation Concentration Center, 31 October – 7 December 1917
- Replacement Concentration Center, American Expeditionary Forces, 2 January 1918
- Third Aviation Instruction Center, 21 February 1918
- Services of Supply, American Expeditionary Forces, 4 January–8 March 1919
- Eastern Department, 8–18 Mar 1919
- 32d Division Air Service (later Divisional Aviation, 32d Division), 7 May 1926
- Attached to 32d Division, 15 February 1929
- 46th Observation Group, 1 October 1933
- Fourth Corps Area 15 October 1940
- V Army Corps, c. December 1940
- 67th Observation Group (later 67th Reconnaissance Group, 67th Tactical Reconnaissance Group), 1 September 1941 – 9 November 1945
- 127th Fighter Group, 29 September 1946
- 66th Fighter Wing, 26 November 1946
- 126th Bombardment Group, February 1947
- 127th Fighter Group (later 127th Pilot Training Group), c. 1 July 1950 – 1 November 1952
- 127th Fighter-Bomber Group (later 127th Fighter-Interceptor Group, 127th Fighter Group, 127th Tactical Reconnaissance Group, 127th Tactical Fighter Group), 1 November 1952
- 127th Tactical Fighter Wing (later 127th Fighter Wing), 9 December 1974
- 127th Operations Group, c. 1 January 1993 – present

=== Stations ===
- Kelly Field, Texas, 27 August 1917
- Hazelhurst Field, New York, c. 31 October-7 December 1917
- St. Maixent Replacement Barracks, France, 2 January 1918
- Issoudun Aerodrome, France, 21 February 1918
- St Nazaire, France, c. 4 January 1919 – 1919
- Garden City, New York, c. 8–18 March 1919
- Detroit Airport, Michigan, 7 May 1926
- Wayne County Airport, Michigan, c. 1929
- DeRidder Army Air Base, Louisiana, 28 October 1940
- Charleston Army Air Base, South Carolina, c. 14 December 1941
- Esler Field, Louisiana, 30 January-12 August 1942
- RAF Membury (AAF-466), England, c. 7 September 1942
- RAF Aldermaston (AAF-467), England, 25 November 1942
- RAF Membury (AAF-466), England, 8 January 1943
- RAF Middle Wallop (AAF-449), England, 11 December 1943
- Deux Jumeaux Airfield (A-4), France, 28 June 1944
- Le Molay Airfield (A-8), France, 5 July 1944
- Toussus-le-Noble Airport (A-46), France, 29 August 1944
- Gosselies Airfield (AAF-184) (A-87), Belgium, 16 September 1944

Operated from: Chievres Airfield (A-84), Belgium, 7–18 Dec 1944

- Vogelsang Airfield (Y-51), Germany, 23 March 1945
- Limburg Airfield (Y-83), Germany, 4 April 1945
- Eschwege Airfield (R-11), Germany, 9 Apr-5 Ju1 1945
- Drew Field, Florida, 16 September–9 November 1945
- Wayne County Airport, MI, 9 July 1946 – 1 February 1951
- Luke Air Force Base, Arizona, 1 February 1951 – 1 November 1952
- Detroit-Wayne Major Airport, Michigan, 1 November 1952
- Selfridge Air National Guard Base, (formerly Selfridge Air Force Base), Michigan, July 1971 – present

=== Aircraft ===
- Included Consolidated PT-1, Northrop BT-1, and Douglas O-2 during period 1927–1932
- Douglas O-38, 1931–1941
- In addition to North American O-47, c. 1938–1942, and O-49, 1941–1942
- Included Curtiss O-52 Owl, A-20 Havoc, and P-51A Mustang in 1942
- Supermarine Spitfire Mk.Vb, 1942–1944
- L-4 Grasshopper, 1942–1943
- F-3A Havoc and DB-7 Boston, 1943
- North American F-6B Mustang, 1943–1945
- North American F-51H Mustang, 1946–1950
- F-84 Thunderjet, 1950–1952
- F-51H Mustang, 1951–1952
- F-80 Shooting Star, 1951–1952
- F-84 Thunderjet, 1951–1952
- F-86E Sabre, 1952–1953
- F-89C Scorpion, 1953–1958
- RF-84F Thunderstreak, 1958–1971
- RF-101C Voodoo, 1971–1972
- F-100D Super Sabre, 1972–1978
- A-7D Corsair II, 1979–1989
- General Dynamics F-16 Fighting Falcon, 1989–2008
- Fairchild Republic A-10 Thunderbolt II, 2008–present
- Boeing F-15EX Eagle II (planned 2028)

== See also ==
- List of American aero squadrons
- List of observation squadrons of the United States Army National Guard
