= 171st Air Refueling Squadron =

Michigan Air National Guard unit

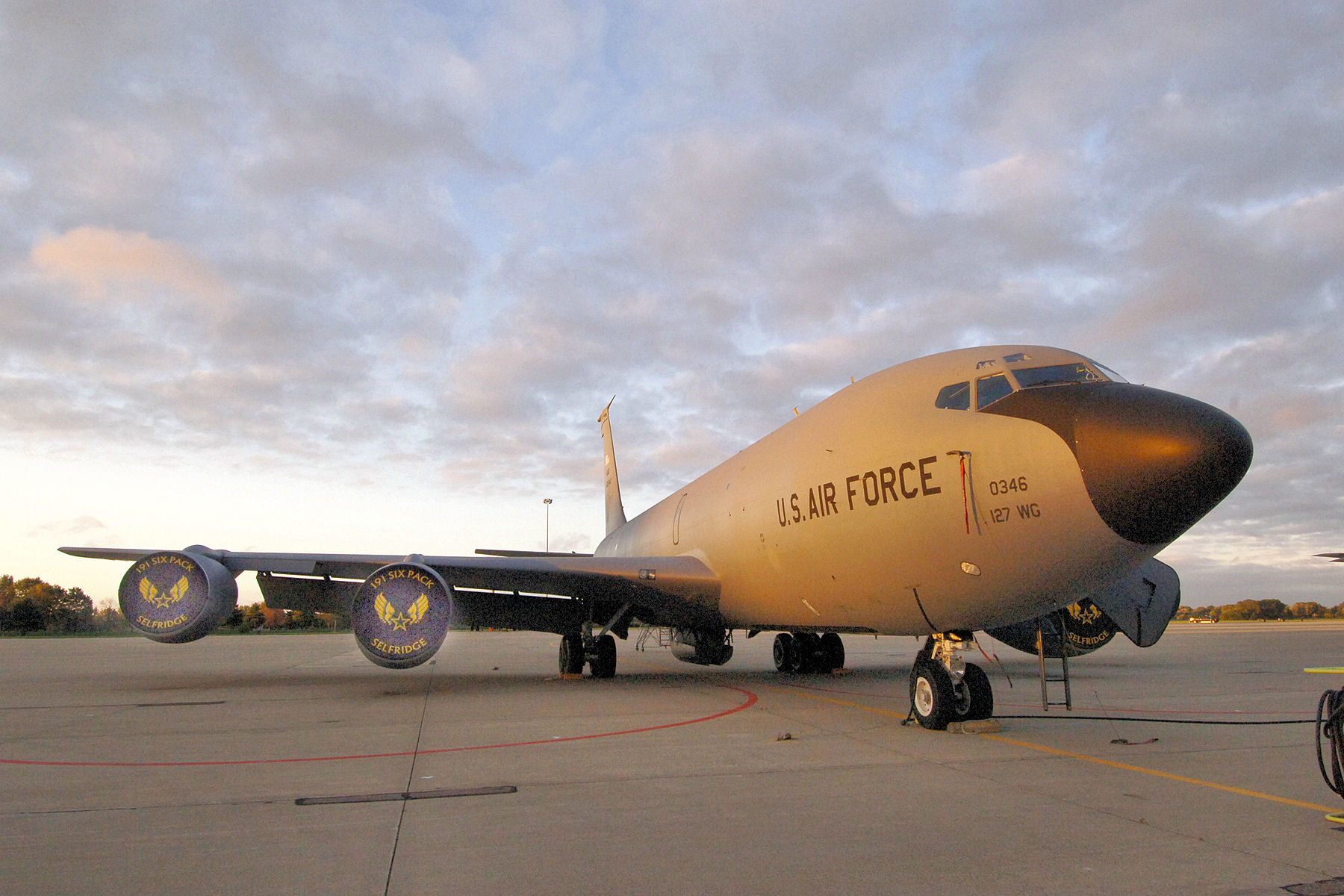
- KC-135T Stratotanker 60-0346 171st Air Refueling Squadron
- Active: 10 February 1943–Present
- Country: United States
- Allegiance: United States; Michigan
- Branch: United States Air Force; Air National Guard
- Type: Squadron
- Role: Aerial refueling
- Part of: Michigan Air National Guard; 127th Air Refueling Group
- Garrison/HQ: Selfridge Air National Guard Base, Mount Clemens, Michigan
- Nickname: "Michigan Six Pack"
- Tail Flash: Black tail stripe "Michigan" in Yellow
- Engagements: European Theater of Operations

Insignia
- 171st Airlift Squadron emblem

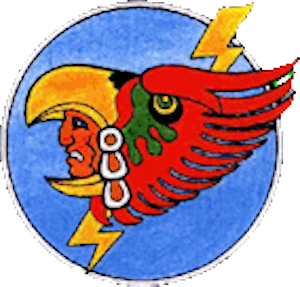
Emblem of the World War II 374th Fighter Squadron

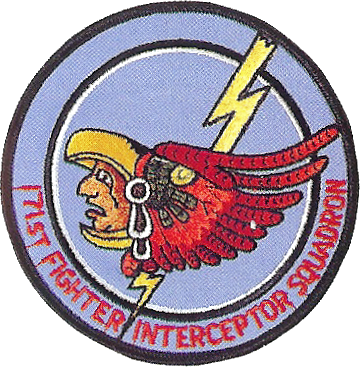
Emblem of the 171st Fighter-Interceptor Squadron (ADC)

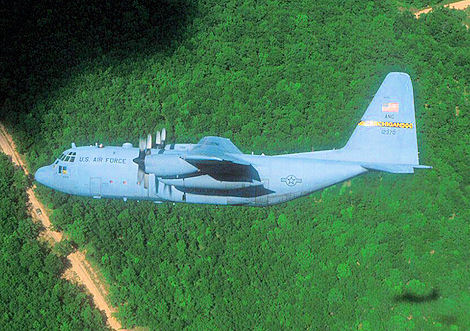
171st Airlift Squadron C-130 Hercules

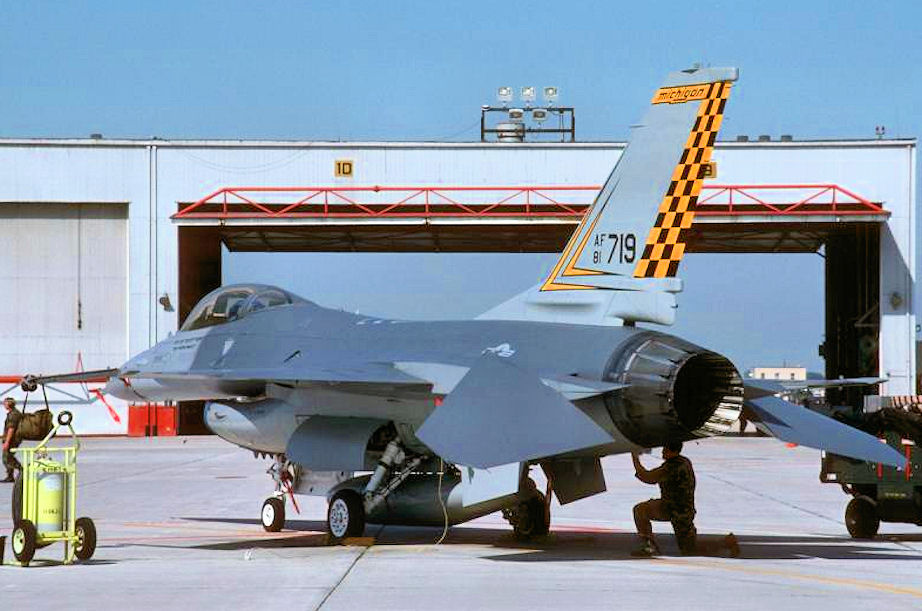
171st Fighter Squadron F-16A interceptor, 1991

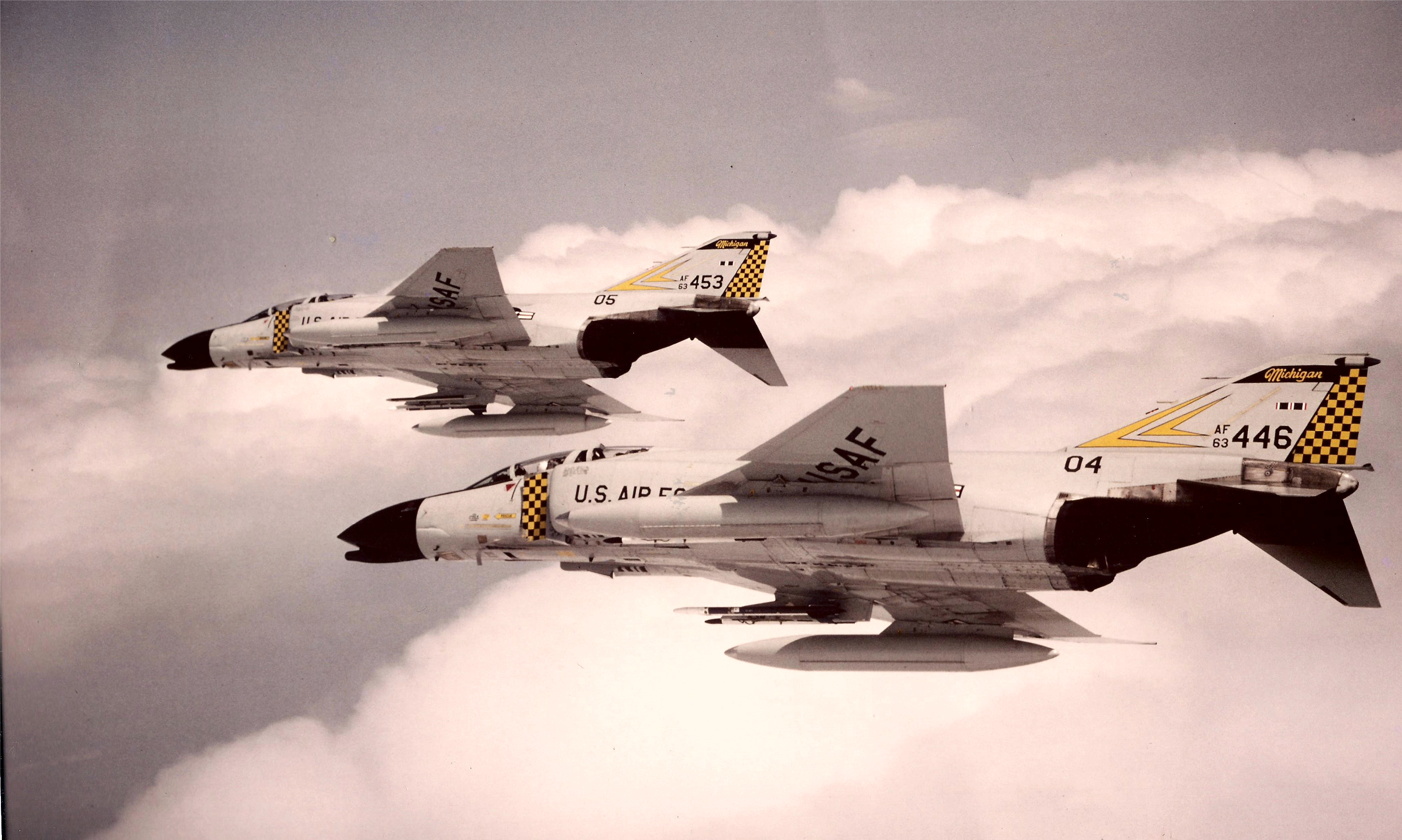
171st Fighter Squadron F-4C interceptor, 1983

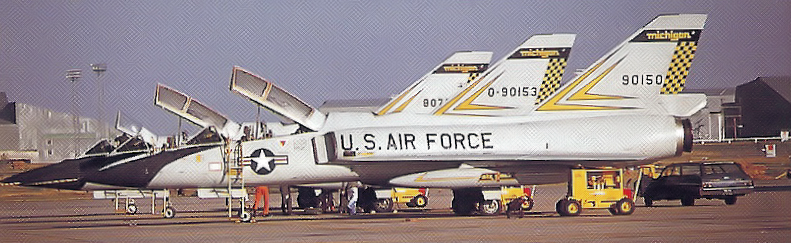
Convair F-106B-75-CO Delta Darts 59-0150 and 59-0153. Check tail and "Michigan" appeared at the top of the tail fin.

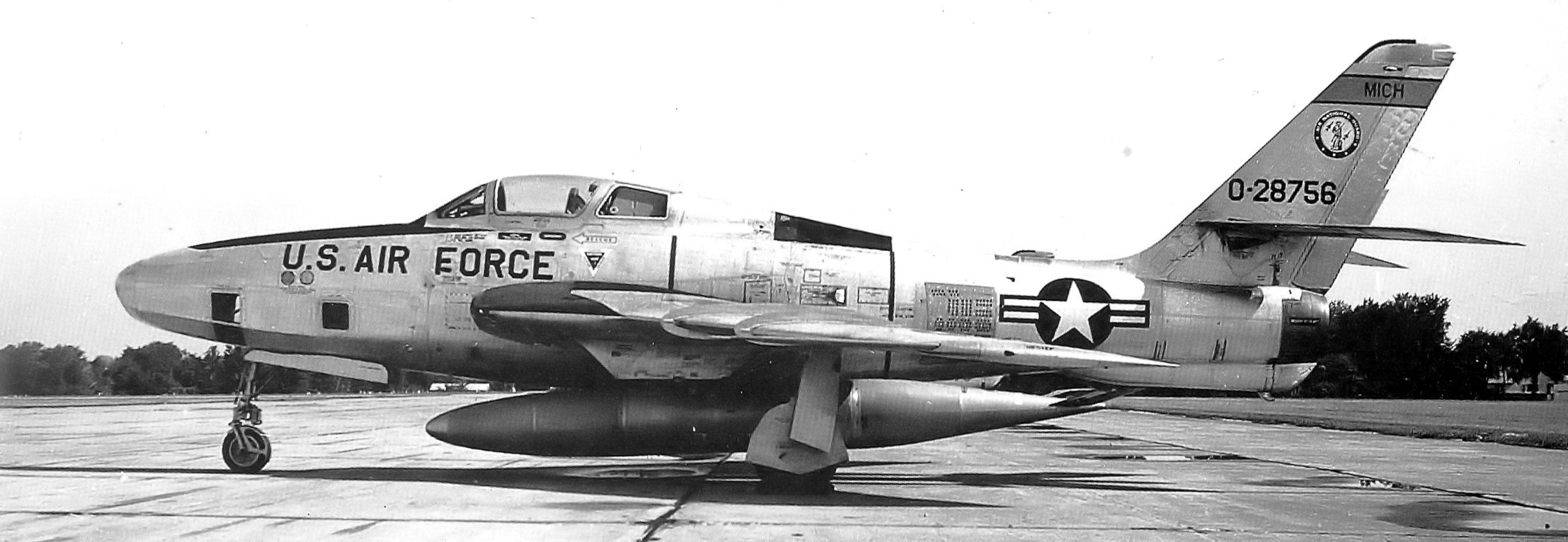
171st Tactical Reconnaissance Squadron RF-84F 52-8756

The 171st Air Refueling Squadron (171 ARS) is a unit of the Michigan Air National Guard's 127th Wing (127 WG) located at Selfridge Air National Guard Base, Michigan. The 171st is equipped with the KC-135T Stratotanker.

== History ==
=== World War II ===
Established in early 1943 as a P-47 Thunderbolt fighter squadron, the 374th Fighter Squadron trained under I Fighter Command in the mid-Atlantic states. Also flew air-defense missions as part of the Philadelphia Fighter Wing. Deployed to the European Theater of Operations (ETO) as part of the 361st Fighter Group, being assigned to VIII Fighter Command in England, November 1943.

The unit served primarily as an escort organization, covering the penetration, attack, and withdrawal of B-17/B-24 bomber formations that the USAAF sent against targets on the Continent. The squadron also engaged in counter-air patrols, fighter sweeps, and strafing and dive-bombing missions. Attacked such targets as airdromes, marshalling yards, missile sites, industrial areas, ordnance depots, oil refineries, trains, and highways. During its operations, the unit participated in the assault against the Luftwaffe and aircraft industry during the Big Week, 20–25 February 1944, and the attack on transportation facilities prior to the Normandy invasion and support of the invasion forces thereafter, including the Saint-Lô breakthrough in July.

The squadron supported the airborne attack on the Netherlands in September 1944 and deployed to Chievres Airdrome, (ALG A-84), Belgium between February and April 1945 flying tactical ground support missions during the airborne assault across the Rhine river. The unit returned to Little Walden and flew its last combat mission on 20 April 1945. Demobilized during the summer of 1945 in England, inactivated in the United States as a paper unit in October.

=== Michigan Air National Guard ===
The wartime 374th Fighter Squadron was re-designated as the 171st Fighter Squadron, and was allotted to the Michigan Air National Guard, on 24 May 1946. It was organized at Wayne County Airport, Michigan, and was extended federal recognition on 25 April 1948. The 171st Fighter Squadron was entitled to the history, honors, and colors of the 374th. The squadron was equipped with F-47D Thunderbolts and was assigned to the Michigan ANG 127th Fighter Group.

The unit was ordered into active service on 1 February 1951, as a result of the Korean War and assigned to Air Training Command. In March 1951 being assigned F-51 Mustangs, F-80 Shooting Stars and F-84 Thunderjets while serving as a training organization.

The unit was relieved from active duty in November 1952, was redesignated as a Fighter-Bomber squadron. Mission aircraft were F-51H, F-86E and F-89C. Redesignated at Tactical Reconnaissance Squadron in 1958. The squadron flew RF-84F's. Moving to Selfridge Air National Guard Base in 1971 and upgrading to the newer RF-101 Voodoo.

Became an Aerospace Defense Command (ADCOM) Fighter-Interceptor squadron in 1972, equipped with F-106 Delta Dart interceptors. Performed air defense duties of the Great Lakes and Detroit area until 1978 when ADCOM was merged into Tactical Air Command (TAC). Continued air defense mission for ADTAC component of TAC with F-4 Phantom IIs, transferring to First Air Force when ADTAC was replaced in 1985. Upgraded to F-16A Fighting Falcons in 1990.

Realigned into an airlift squadron in 1993, equipped with C-130 Hercules tactical airlifters. Flew the C-130 until September 2007 when it was realigned as an Air Refueling Squadron, being equipped with the KC-135T Stratotanker.

=== Lineage ===
- Constituted 374th Fighter Squadron on 28 January 1942

Activated on 10 February 1943
Inactivated on 24 October 1945

- Redesignated 171st Fighter Squadron, and allotted to the Michigan Air National Guard, 24 May 1946

Federally recognized, 171st Fighter Squadron (Single Engine), 25 April 1948
Redesignated 171st Fighter Squadron (Jet), 23 February 1950
Activated to Federal Service, 23 February 1951
Redesignated 171st Training Squadron, 5 March 1951
Returned to Michigan State Control, 11 September 1952
Redesignated 171st Fighter-Bomber Squadron, 1 November 1952
Redesignated 171st Fighter Interceptor Squadron, November 1953
Redesignated 171st Tactical Reconnaissance Squadron, 1958
Redesignated 171st Fighter Interceptor Squadron, 22 July 1972
Redesignated 171st Tactical Fighter Squadron, 1 September 1978
Redesignated 171st Fighter Squadron, 15 March 1992
Redesignated 171st Airlift Squadron, 15 July 1994
Redesignated 171st Air Refueling Squadron, 1 April 2008.

=== Assignments ===
- 361st Fighter Group, 10 February 1943 – 24 October 1945
- 127th Fighter Group, 25 April 1948 – 30 September 1962
- 191st Tactical Reconnaissance Group, 1 October 1962 – 31 December 1972
- 191st Fighter-Interceptor Group, 1 January 1973 – 31 May 1978
- 191st Tactical Fighter Group, 1 June 1978 – 15 March 1992
- 191st Fighter Group, 16 March 1992 – 14 July 1994
- 191st Airlift Group, 15 July 1994 – 31 March 1996
- 127th Airlift Group, 1 April 1996 – 1 May 1999
- 191st Airlift Group, 1 May 1999 – 30 September 2007
- 127th Air Refueling Group, 30 September 2007 – Present

=== Stations ===
- Richmond Army Air Base, Virginia, 10 February 1943
- Camp Springs Army Airfield, Maryland, 26 May 1943
- Millville Army Airfield, New Jersey, 15 August 1943
- Camp Springs Army Airfield, Maryland, 18 September 1943
- Richmond Army Air Base, Virginia, 30 September – 11 November 1943
- RAF Bottisham (AAF-374), England, 30 November 1943
- RAF Little Walden (AAF-165), England, ca. 28 September 1944

Operated from St-Dizier Airfield (A-64), France, 23 December 1944 – 1 February 1945

- Chievres Airdrome (A-84), Belgium, 1 February 1945
- RAF Little Walden (AAF-165), England, 7 April – ca. 11 October 1945
- Camp Kilmer, New Jersey, 23–24 October 1945
- Wayne County Airport, Michigan, 25 April 1948
- Luke Air Force Base, Arizona, 23 February 1951
- Detroit-Wayne Major Airport, Michigan, 11 September 1952
- Selfridge Air National Guard Base, Michigan, July 1971–Present

=== Aircraft ===
- P-47 Thunderbolt, 1943–1944
- P-51 Mustang, 1944–1950
- F-84 Thunderjet, 1950–1952
- F-51H Mustang, 1952–1953
- F-86E Sabre, 1953–1955
- F-89C Scorpion, 1955–1958
- RF-84F Thunderflash, 1958–1971

- RF-101A/C Voodoo, 1971–1972
- F-106A/B Delta Dart 1972–1978
- F-4C Phantom II 1978–1988
- F-4D Phantom II 1988–1991
- F-16A/B Block 15 Fighting Falcon 1991–1995
- C-130 Hercules1995–2007
- KC-135T Stratotanker 2007–Present
