= Selfridge Air National Guard Base =

Air National Guard base in Michigan, US

- Near Mount Clemens, Michigan in the United States
- An A-10 Thunderbolt II, assigned to the 107th Fighter Squadron of the Michigan Air National Guard, taxis on the flight line at Selfridge ANGB.

Site information
- Type: Air National Guard Base
- Owner: Department of Defense
- Operator: US Air Force (USAF)
- Controlled by: Michigan Air National Guard (ANG)
- Condition: Operational
- Website: www.127wg.ang.af.mil

Location
- Location within Michigan Location within the United States
- Coordinates: 42°36′30″N 082°50′08″W

Site history
- Built: 1917 (as Joy Aviation Field)
- In use: 1917 – present

Garrison information
- Garrison: 127th Wing (host)

Airfield information
- Identifiers: IATA: MTC, ICAO: KMTC, FAA LID: MTC, WMO: 725377
- Elevation: 176.7 metres (580 ft) AMSL
Runways
Direction	Length and surface
01/19	2,743.2 metres (9,000 ft) Porous European Mix

Selfridge Air National Guard Base or Selfridge ANGB (IATA: MTC, ICAO: KMTC, FAA LID: MTC) is an Air National Guard installation located in Harrison Township, Michigan, near Mount Clemens. Selfridge Field was one of thirty-two Air Service training camps established after the United States entry into World War I in April 1917.

The current commander of Selfridge Air National Guard Base is Brig. Gen. Leah Voelker, its first female commanding officer.

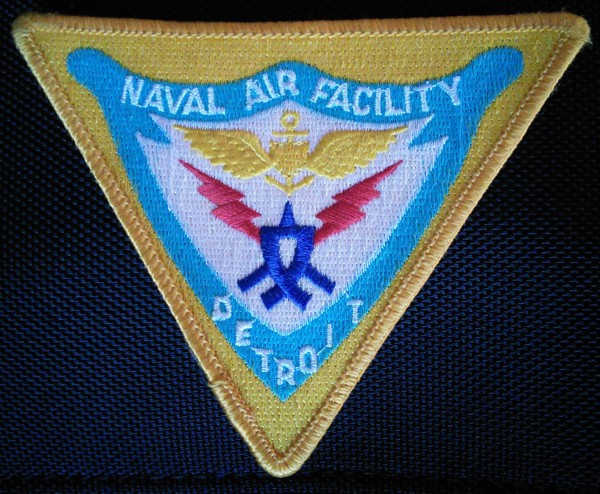
A patch (and the insignia) of the Naval Air Facility Detroit

== Units and organizations ==
The host organization is the 127th Wing (127 WG) of the Michigan Air National Guard, but a variety of Air Force Reserve, Navy Reserve, Marine Corps Reserve, Army Reserve, Army National Guard, and active duty Coast Guard units use the facility as well. In 1971, Selfridge ANGB became the largest and most complex joint Reserve Forces base in the United States, a position it held until surpassed by NAS JRB Fort Worth (former Carswell AFB) in the late 1990s.

U.S. Army Garrison-Selfridge serves the Tank-automotive and Armaments Command (TACOM) supporting tank construction in the Detroit area.

The airport is home to the 176th Selfridge Composite Squadron of the Civil Air Patrol (CAP), the auxiliary civilian arm of the US Air Force, as well as the headquarters of CAP's Michigan Wing.

Selfridge is home to Headquarters and Service Company, 1st Battalion, 24th Marines and Marine Wing Support Group 47 (MWSG-47).

The base is also home to Detachment 1, Company B, 3-238th General Support Aviation Battalion, which currently flies the CH-47 Chinook.

=== Selfridge Military Air Museum ===
The on-base Selfridge Military Air Museum is operated by the Michigan Air Guard Historical Association, exhibits photos and artifacts of military aerospace history, and has an outdoor Air Park of over 30 aircraft.

== History ==
Selfridge Air National Guard Base is named after 1st Lieutenant Thomas E. Selfridge. He was detailed for aeronautical duty in April 1908 after being an assistant to Professor Alexander Graham Bell, who was conducting aeronautical experiments in Nova Scotia. Selfridge was killed on 17 September 1908 while flying as a passenger with Orville Wright at Fort Myer, Virginia. He was the first person to be killed in a crash of a powered aircraft.

=== World War I ===
The origins of Selfridge Air National Guard Base date to 1916, when a large tract of land on Lake St. Clair, Michigan was acquired by the Packard Motor Car Company at the urging of Packard president Henry B. Joy, who took a great interest in aviation and led the company to begin developing aircraft engines for use in aircraft engaged in World War I combat in Europe. In the spring of 1917, lobbying began in Washington to locate a military airfield at the site of the Joy Aviation Field on Lake St. Clair. The United States had just officially entered World War I on April 7. Proponents of the site pointed out the advantages of the field's proximity to the auto capital of the nation and the availability of the lake for practice bombing.

In May 1917, it was announced that Joy Aviation Field would be included as a training Camp as part of the expansion of the Air Service, becoming one of only nine military airfields in the country at the time. The United States Army leased the 640 acres (260 ha) of land, and construction commenced immediately to provide the necessary road and rail access to the site. Within a month, the newspaper was reporting that 1,000 men were at work at the field constructing hangars, barracks, supply depots, machine shops and a school building.

On 9 July, the first training aircraft, a Curtiss JN-4D, arrived at the new airfield, and the base was gearing up to train men in flying, bombing, radio, and photography for the war effort. The first pilots were members of the 8th and 9th Aero Squadrons, and Captain Byron Q. Jones was the first commander at Selfridge. Actual pilot training began on 16 July 1917, three months after war was declared. Some of these students, a few of them from Mount Clemens area, were given a few flights and then, within two weeks, whisked overseas for advanced training and to meet the enemy. During the summer of 1917, 72 men won aviator ratings and, combined, logged over 3,700 flying hours. From that time on, hundreds of young men passed through Selfridge Air Pilot School for the four weeks of training which qualified them for a commission. Then they were on their way as instructors to the front or to the other flying schools. being established throughout the country.

Training units assigned to Selfridge Field were:

- Post Headquarters, Selfridge Field – October 1919
- 40th Aero Squadron, August 1917

Re-designated as Squadron "A", July–November 1918

- 380th Aero Squadron, January 1918

Re-designated as Squadron "B", July–November 1918

- Squadron "C", August–November 1918
- Squadron "D", August–November 1918
- Squadron "E", August–November 1918
- Flying School Detachment (Consolidation of Squadrons A-E), November 1918 – November 1919

Flying was considered impractical in Michigan during the winter months, so student pilots were sent to Gerstner Field at Lake Charles, Louisiana as well as to Chapman Field at Miami, Florida. Selfridge was transformed into a mechanics school for the winter months. 700 qualified mechanics were graduated from this school, which lasted until March 1918. Six squadrons from Kelly Field, Texas were sent to Selfridge for study in the shops.

The training center suffered an early setback in March 1918, as the Clinton River flooded the entire site, and all personnel were evacuated to schools and churches in nearby Mount Clemens.

On April 1, 1918, preparations got underway for the opening of a new gunnery school at the airport. Instructors were borrowed from the French, British, and Canadian flying corps. By July 1918, Selfridge had reached its peak performance in gunnery training. Over 250 students were enrolled at one time, and on one occasion 52 planes were in the air over the field simultaneously. Classes were so filled that 150 Lewis air guns, 60 Lewis ground guns, 80 Marlin air guns, 90 camera guns and 10 aerial cameras were in use daily. By the end of World War I, the young base had 1,028 enlisted men and 200 officers. It had trained 72 pilots and 700 mechanics, and 1,002 men had attended gunnery school.

The 1918 Armistice with Germany ended World War I. The end of the war, however, produced some major changes. From a training field producing mechanics and gunners, Selfridge became a pursuit (fighter) field, but men who had enlisted for the duration of the war were being discharged, and no new students were being trained.

=== Inter-war period ===
Beginning 27 June 1919, Selfridge became the home of the 1st Pursuit Group, currently the oldest combat group in the Air Force. The group was organized in France during World War I and like many others, was demobilized after the war then re-created in 1919. It remained based at Selfridge for approximately 20 years. Many notable names are included in the group's roster including George H. Brett, James "Jimmy" Doolittle, Carl A. Spaatz, Curtis LeMay, Frank O. Hunter, Emmett "Rosie" O'Donnell, Earle E. Partridge, Paul Wurtsmith and over 100 men who rose to the rank of Air Force general ("Home of Generals"). (Lieutenant LeMay was fined $50 for flying a biplane through Selfridge Hangar #6.)

The uncertain future of Selfridge Field, however, caused the 1st Pursuit Group to be moved to Kelly Field, Texas, shortly after its return. On 28 August 1919, following an order from Washington, all but 40 men left for Texas airfields. Finally reduced to a staff of only 14 civilians, Selfridge Field for all practical purposes ceased to exist for government officials.

Until 1921, the government leased Selfridge Field from Henry B. Joy. That year, Joy offered to sell the property for $190,000, a price government appraisers felt was too high. But when the National Aeronautics Advisory Committee pointed out the field's proximity to the mechanical and industrial centers of Detroit, the price was paid. The field sprang back to life on 1 July 1922, when the 1st Pursuit Group, which had gone from Kelly Field to Ellington Field outside Houston, Texas, in 1921, returned to make Selfridge its home for almost the next 20 years. In 1922, Selfridge was declared a permanent installation under command of Maj. Carl "Tooey" Spaatz, who later became Chief of Staff for the Air Force.

Air races at Selfridge from 1922 through the 1930s included the first John Mitchell Trophy Race (named for John L. Mitchell and last held in 1936 at Selfridge), the Pulitzer Trophy Race, and the Curtiss Trophy Race and Boeing Trophy. Charles A. Lindbergh was assigned to Selfridge in 1927, returned in July 1927 (his transatlantic aircraft, Spirit of St. Louis, was escorted by 22 1st Pursuit Group planes)m and returned again 10 November 1927 to become a member of the 1st Pursuit Group and complete his reserve training.

In 1925, planes equipped with ice skids left Selfridge for Camp Skeel in Oscoda, Michigan to determine the usefulness of airplanes in harsh winter. Squadron commander Thomas Lamphier declared the test a success and proclaimed that similarly planes could be used to in Arctic regions.

During the 1930s and 1940s, squadrons "from Selfridge [frequently] performed maneuvers over Detroit, [causing delight to] local citizens." In 1935, Selfridge became part of the top-level General Headquarters (GHO), Air Force, along with five other strategically located installations: Mitchel Field in New York, Langley Field in Virginia, Barksdale Field in Louisiana, March Field in California and Hamilton Field in California. A large expansion program was launched in 1939 to train four new pursuit groups at Selfridge for eventual assignment to other GHQ fields. Many of the temporary frame buildings still in use today were built at that time, when a $13.5 million construction program was started at Selfridge.

The outbreak of war in Europe in 1939 again brought many changes to Selfridge Field. The 17th Pursuit Squadron, a member of the 1st Pursuit Group since June 1918, was reassigned to the Philippines. More Selfridge pilots left for the Pacific in a surprise move early in 1940, when 40 pilots and mechanics volunteered to serve with Gen. Claire Chennault and his Flying Tigers. They left for Rangoon early in the summer.

=== World War II ===
Selfridge was a World War II army airfield of the First Air Force and the location where Colonel Lawrence P. Hickey headed a cadre that organized the VIII Interceptor Command on 19 January 1942 (transferred to Charleston AAF on 13 February, arrived RAF High Wycombe on 12 May). On 29 March 1943, the 332d Fighter Group of the Tuskegee Airmen completed its move to Selfridge. The commander of the Tuskegee's European and Mediterranean operations was Colonel Benjamin O. Davis Jr., the first black officer to graduate from West Point in the 20th century, and later the first black Air Force general.

==== Court-martial of William T. Colman ====
Scandal hit Selfridge on 5 May 1943, when Colonel William Truman Colman, commandant of the base, was charged with shooting Private William MacRae, a black chauffeur who was assigned to drive him. Early reports stated that the incident occurred because Colman's regular driver was off-duty and a dispatcher was unaware of his standing order that he not have a black driver. Following the incident, accusations of several other improper occurrences at the base including misappropriation of government property, procurement of unlawful transfers and exchange of goods for transfers. Colman was found guilty of careless use of firearms after a court martial and demoted to captain. However, he was acquitted of 23 other charges that included authorizing illegal transfers, accepting bribes and theft of government property.

==== 477th Bombardment Group (M) (Colored) ====
The 477th Bombardment Group (Medium) was reactivated as the 477th Bombardment Group (M) (Colored) at Selfridge on 15 January 1944 to train Tuskegee Airmen with Republic P-47 Thunderbolt fighters and North American B-25 Mitchell bombers. Following a reprimand of base commander Colonel William Boyd for segregating blacks, the Group relocated "without any prior warning or notification to its personnel to Godman Field, Kentucky, on 5 May 1944.

=== United States Air Force ===
After World War II, Selfridge expanded to its present size of 3,600 acres (1,500 ha), and in 1947 the Selfridge Field was renamed Selfridge Air Force Base. The base grew steadily and soundly, acquiring impressive buildings and long concrete strips. In 1950, Headquarters for the Tenth Air Force, which was in charge of all Air Reserve records for a 13-state area in the Midwest, moved to Selfridge. It recalled and trained Air Reservists, and as an administrative group, the Tenth was the largest of the tenant units at Selfridge.

From 1947 to 1970, the base hosted three successive Cold War aircraft units: the 56th Fighter Wing (28 July 1947 – 1952), which conducted the first west-to-east jet fighter transatlantic crossing (US to Scotland via Greenland, 1948); the 4708th Defense (later Air Defense) Wing from 1952 to 1956; the 439th Fighter-Bomber Wing (1952–1957); and the 1st Fighter Wing (Air Defense) from 1956 to 1970. The units' Selfridge aircraft were F-51 Mustangs (439th, 1953–54), Lockheed P-80 Shooting Stars (439th 1953–1956, 56th), F-84 Thunderstreaks (439th), North American F-86D Sabres (1st), and F-102 Delta Daggers (1st). In April 1954, the Selfridge's 13th Fighter-Intercepter Squadron of the 4708th Air Defense Wing won the Eastern Air Defense Force rocket gunnery championship; and on 10 May 1956, a Selfridge F-86D accidentally fired 22 Mighty Mouse rockets while on the ground. In November 1957, Air Defense Command (ADC) assumed control of Selfridge AFB.

The inactivation of Tenth Air Force began in the fall of 1959, and it was completed by July 1960. At that time, the 5th Air Force Reserve Region was established at Selfridge. Also added as a tenant in July was the 4045th Air Refueling Wing, Strategic Air Command (SAC).

On 8 May 1964, disaster struck the area north of the base. A tornado cut a wide swath along the shores of Lake St. Clair, causing some damage to the base and bringing injury, death and destruction to the local area. The base was quick to render aid to its distressed neighbors, providing emergency medical care, sending vehicles to help clear away the debris and furnishing emergency shelters for those made homeless by the storm.

In 1965, the Strategic Air Command announced that the 4045th Air Refueling Wing was to be discontinued beginning in 1966. In the continually changing pattern of uses of the Selfridge facility, plans were announced for the activation of the U.S. Coast Guard Air Station, Detroit, at Selfridge. A new Wing Commander, Col. Kenneth E. Rosebush, also arrived in August from Headquarters, Pacific Command. In July, 1966, the Coast Guard moved to Selfridge Air Force Base as a tenant.

From 1950 to 1974, the Selfridge AFB radar station, including a Missile Master Army Air Defense Command Post after 1960, provided ground-controlled interception coverage for interceptor aircraft and surface-to-air missiles. Selfridge was the 1950 location of the Headquarters and Headquarters Battery (HHB) 28th Air Defense Artillery Group for the Army's Detroit Defense Area, part of Army Air Defense Command. Beginning in 1955, the base also had Project Nike radars for dual launch sites on Selfridge AFB at 42°35′46″N 82°49′4″W with battery D-14 in service until February 1963 and co-located battery D-16 continuing until June 1971. The "shared" Selfridge integrated fire control (IFC) area was at 42°35′55″N 82°49′9″W. The 3d Battalion, 517th Artillery manned the Nike facilities.

On 29 October 1969, the Secretary of Defense announced Project 703, a program calling for a reduction of military forces as a result of budgetary cuts. As a result, the 1st Fighter Wing was inactivated on 31 December, and a 33-year chapter in the history of Selfridge came to an end. The 94th Fighter-Interceptor Squadron prepared to move to Wurtsmith Air Force Base near Oscoda, Michigan, and elements of the 1st Combat Support Group were re-designated the 4708th Air Base Group on 1 January 1970.

=== Michigan Air National Guard ===
The Michigan Air National Guard's 127th Tactical Reconnaissance Wing moved its entire operation from Detroit Metropolitan Airport near Romulus to Selfridge in December, 1970. The 127th became the largest flying unit on the base, and Air National Guard jets dominated the Selfridge skies.

On 1 July 1971, Selfridge Air Force Base was transferred to the Michigan Air National Guard, becoming the first major active Air Force base to come under control of the Air National Guard. At Selfridge Air National Guard Base, the 127th Wing (127 WG) is the host wing to more than 30 tenant units representing every branch of the military – active duty (to include the Coast Guard), Reserve and National Guard. The U.S. Customs and Border Protection Air and Marine Operations Northern Region and Great Lakes Air and Marine Branch are also based at Selfridge as well as CBP's U.S. Border Patrol Detroit Sector. Collectively, these organizations compose what is known "Team Selfridge", one community with synergistic goals and missions.

The 127th Wing (127 WG) of the Michigan Air National Guard is a combined Air Combat Command (ACC) and Air Mobility Command (AMC) gained organization that was established at Selfridge ANG Base on 1 April 1996, by consolidating the former 127th Fighter Wing and the 191st Airlift Group. The flying units which previously flew the F-16 Fighting Falcon and the C-130 Hercules, converted their flying missions per 2005 Base Realignment and Closure Commission (BRAC) action. Today, the ACC-gained 107th Fighter Squadron flies the A-10C Thunderbolt II, also known as the A-10 "Warthog". The AMC-gained 127th Airlift Group was renamed the 127th Air Refueling Group and its 171st Air Refueling Squadron now flies the KC-135T Stratotanker.

The 127th Wing was also home to the Air National Guard's now defunct 107th Weather Flight, which is operationally gained by the Air Force Special Operations Command (AFSOC). These specially trained Airmen collect weather data, develop forecasting products and direct forecasts to the warfighters on the ground, sometimes going ahead of a main operation to prepare soldiers with weather data for the success of the mission.

=== Air Force Reserve Command ===
Pursuant to Base Realignment and Closure, 2005, the Air Force Reserve Command's 927th Air Refueling Wing (927 ARW) that was previously based at Selfridge was directed to transfer its 4x KC-135T Stratotanker aircraft to the Michigan Air National Guard and relocate to MacDill AFB, Florida in August 2007 as verified by Selfridge's Public Affairs Office. At MacDill, the 927 ARW has become an Air Force Reserve "Associate" wing to MacDill's 6th Air Mobility Wing, with both organizations flying the KC-135R PACER CRAG variant of the Stratotanker.

=== Naval Air Facility Detroit ===
NAF Detroit was established as a tenant activity at Selfridge ANGB in 1969 following the disestablishment of Naval Air Station Grosse Ile, Michigan. NAF Detroit remained operational until 1994, when it was closed and realigned due to BRAC action. An Echelon IV command of Naval Air Force Reserve, NAF Detroit hosted numerous Naval Reserve augmentation units supporting fleet commands and shore activities in the Atlantic and Pacific Fleets, as well as three operational Reserve Force Aviation Squadrons (RESFORONs): Fleet Composite Squadron Twelve (VC-12) flying the A-4F Skyhawk II, Patrol Squadron 93 (VP-93) flying the P-3B Orion, and Fleet Logistics Support Squadron 62 (VR-62) flying the C-9B Skytrain II. NAF Detroit also hosted Marine Wing Support Group 47 (MWSG-47) of the Marine Air Reserve's 4th Marine Aircraft Wing. On 15 July 2012, MWSG-47 was deactivated from service.

VC-12 was transferred to NAS Oceana, Virginia, in 1975 and was redesignated as Fighter Composite Squadron 12 (VFC-12) in 1988, where it currently flies the F/A-18 Hornet as a Reserve adversary squadron.

VP-93 was disestablished on 30 September 1994 due to (1) retirement of the P-3B from the U.S. Navy inventory and a transition to an all P-3C force, (2) a reduction in active and Reserve VP squadrons as part of post-Cold War drawdown, and (3) BRAC action directing the closure of NAF Detroit and its realignment as Naval Air Reserve Center Detroit (NAVAIRESCEN Detroit) with no operational flying units or activities.

VR-62 was transferred in April 1994 to the former NAS South Weymouth, Massachusetts, until that base's closure in September 1996 due to BRAC 1995 action. Concurrent with that move, the squadron also transitioned from the C-9B to the C-130T Hercules. Transferring to the former NAS Brunswick, Maine, subsequent BRAC action in 2008 direct NAS Brunswick's closure in May 2011, resulting in VR-62 being transferred again in 2010 to its current home station of NAS Jacksonville, Florida.

NAF Detroit became NAVAIRESCEN Detroit on 1 October 1994 and remained as a tenant command at Selfridge ANGB. It was renamed Navy Operational Support Center Detroit (NOSC Detroit) in 2006 and downgraded to an Echelon V command.

=== Coast Guard Air Station Detroit ===
CGAS Detroit was established in 1966 as a tenant command at Selfridge ANGB, operating the HH-52A Sea Guard helicopter in the Great Lakes region. Air Station Detroit transitioned to the HH-65A Dolphin in 1988 and continues to operate the MH-65D version of this aircraft in search and rescue, maritime safety, and other homeland security/homeland defense missions.

=== Other uses ===
Other activities located at Selfridge include STARBASE, an Air National Guard initiative that engages in activity-based science and math lessons. The program uses an aviation theme to allow local children to excel, regardless of their economic situation. STARBASE traces its roots to the Air National Guard's 127th Wing at Selfridge ANGB in 1991 and the Department of Defense became an official supporter of the STARBASE program in 1993.

The United States Border Patrol Detroit Sector headquarters is located at Selfridge Air National Guard Base. Detroit Sector area of responsibility includes Illinois, Indiana, Michigan, and Ohio.

In March 2011, the United States Customs and Border Protection "formally opened its new Operational Integration Center on Selfridge".

==== Mitchell Air Races ====
The first Air Show at Selfridge was the 1922 Mitchell Air Races. During that event, both official and unofficial air speed records were set. Prior to the races officially starting – the pilots flew a measured course over Lake St. Clair and back to the base – Army Lt. Russell L. Maughan flew a Curtiss R-6 aircraft 248.5 miles per hours, more than 25 mph more than the fastest speed ever recorded to that point. However, Maughan's flight was not considered official because the race judges were not yet in place. Four days later, on 18 October, Army Brig. Gen. Billy Mitchell flew the same aircraft at 224.05 miles per hour, officially setting the new air speed record. Maughan's day was not in vain, however, as he would later go on to set new air speed records several times throughout the 1920s.

Mitchell Air Races were also held at Selfridge in 1927 and for the last time in 1936.

==== Selfridge International Open House and Air Show ====
The base typically hosts an open house and air show every 2–3 years in the summer months. The last edition of the Selfridge International Open House and Air Show was in July 2022. in September 2011, Wing Walker Todd Green died while attempting a trick, falling 200 feet to his death.

The 2020 edition was cancelled due to the COVID-19 pandemic.

=== Modernization ===
In April 2025, President Donald Trump announced that the A-10 Warthogs of the 107th Fighter Squadron would be replaced by more advanced F-15EX Eagle II's. This decision followed extensive lobbying by Michigan Governor Gretchen Whitmer, who emphasized the critical economic role of Selfridge Air National Guard Base in Macomb County. The base contributed approximately $850 million annually to Michigan's economy and supported around 5,000 military and civilian jobs. Without a replacement mission, the retirement of the A-10s could have led to the loss of 368 positions and a $10 million economic impact on the local community. Whitmer's bipartisan efforts, including a visit to the White House, were pivotal in securing the new fighter mission, ensuring the base's continued operation and economic contribution to the region.

External media

Images
- 1925 & 1930 images
- FAA Airport Diagram (PDF), effective October 29, 2026
- SkyVector aeronautical chart

Video
- 1930s A/C formations (Hearst Metrotone News)

== See also ==
- Aleda E. Lutz
- Selfridge AFB radar station
- Michigan World War II Army Airfields
- United States Army World War I Flight Training
