= Michigan Air National Guard =

United States Air Force Air Combat Command unit

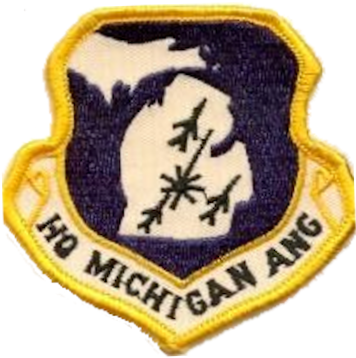
- Shield of the Michigan Air National Guard
- Active: 7 May 1926 – present
- Country: United States
- Allegiance: Michigan
- Branch: Air National Guard
- Type: State militia, military reserve force
- Role: "To meet state and federal mission responsibilities."
- Part of: Michigan National Guard; United States National Guard Bureau
- Garrison/HQ: Joint Force Headquarters Michigan Air National Guard, 3411 N. Martin Luther King Jr. Blvd., Lansing, Michigan 48911

Commanders
- Civilian leadership: President Donald Trump (Commander-in-Chief); Secretary Troy Meink (Secretary of the Air Force); Governor Gretchen Whitmer (Governor of the State of Michigan)
- Adjutant General: Major General Paul D. Rogers
- State Air Commander: Brigadier General Daniel J. Kramer II

Aircraft flown
- Attack: A-10 Thunderbolt II
- Reconnaissance: MQ-9 Reaper
- Tanker: KC-135T Stratotanker

The Michigan Air National Guard (MI ANG) is the aerial militia of the State of Michigan, United States of America. It is, along with the Michigan Army National Guard, an element of the Michigan National Guard of the larger United States National Guard Bureau. The Michigan Air National Guard is also an Air Reserve Component of the United States Air Force.

As a state militia, the Michigan Air National Guard are not in the United States Air Force chain of command unless it is federalized. They are under the jurisdiction of the governor of Michigan through the office of the Michigan adjutant general unless they are federalized by order of the president of the United States.

== Overview ==
Michigan ANG units are trained and equipped by the Air Force and are operationally gained by a major command of the USAF if federalized. In addition, the Michigan Air National Guard forces are assigned to Air Expeditionary Forces and are subject to deployment tasking orders along with their active duty and Air Force Reserve counterparts in their assigned cycle deployment window.

Along with their federal reserve obligations, as state militia units the elements of the Michigan ANG are subject to being activated by order of the governor to provide protection of life and property, and preserve peace, order and public safety. State missions include disaster relief in times of earthquakes, hurricanes, floods and forest fires, search and rescue, protection of vital public services, and support to civil defense.

== Components ==
The Michigan Air National Guard consists of the following major units:

- 110th Wing

Established 16 September 1947 (as: 172d Fighter Squadron); operates: MQ-9 Reaper
Stationed at: Battle Creek Air National Guard Base
Gained by: Air Combat Command
The wing was slated to operate the C-27J Spartan, manufactured by the Italian company Alenia Aermacchi. At the time the C-27J was the newest cargo aircraft in the Air Force inventory. The missions of the C-27 would have included direct support of Army units, homeland security, disaster response, and medical evacuation, as well as multiple other Federal and State requirements. Due to political decisions, the C-27 mission was replaced with a new Remotely Piloted Aircraft (RPA) MQ-9 Reaper mission.

- 127th Wing

Established 7 May 1926 (as: 107th Observation Squadron)
Flying squadrons: 107th Fighter Squadron operates A-10 Thunderbolt II, 171st Air Refueling Squadron operates KC-135T Stratotanker
Stationed at: Selfridge Air National Guard Base, Harrison Township
Elements gained by: Air Combat Command and Air Mobility Command
A composite wing composed of approximately 1,700 Citizen-Airmen and provides highly trained personnel and aircraft and support resources to serve the community, state and nation. The wing operates Boeing KC-135 Stratotankers, providing global aerial refueling capability in support of Air Mobility Command, and the Fairchild Republic A-10 Thunderbolt II, flying the close air support mission for Air Combat Command. The Wing also supported the Air Force Special Operations Command with its 107th Weather Flight (inactivated by 30 September 2017). With approximately 1,700 personnel assigned, the 127th Wing is among the most complex Air National Guard wings. The 127th Wing's home station, Selfridge Air National Guard Base, is the largest facility managed by a reserve component (Air National Guard or U.S. Air Force Reserve) of the U.S. Air Force.

Support Unit Functions and Capabilities:

- Alpena Combat Readiness Training Center

Houses the Combat Readiness Training Center which trains various units from National Guard and the USAF.

== Organization ==
As of February 2026 the Michigan Air National Guard consists of the following units:

- Joint Force Headquarters-Michigan, Air Force Element, in Lansing
  - Headquarters and Headquarters Company, Joint Force Headquarters-Michigan, Air Force Element, in Lansing
  - 110th Wing, at Battle Creek Air National Guard Base
    - 110th Comptroller Flight
    - 110th Operations Group
      - 110th Operations Support Squadron
      - 172nd Attack Squadron, with MQ-9 Reaper
      - 272nd Cyber Operations Squadron
    - 217th Air Operations Group
      - 217th Combat Operations Squadron
      - 217th Air Communications Squadron
      - 217th Air Component Operations Squadron
      - 217th Air Intelligence Squadron
    - 110th Medical Group
    - 110th Mission Support Group
      - 110th Civil Engineering Squadron
      - 110th Security Forces Squadron
      - 110th Logistics Readiness Squadron
      - 110th Force Support Squadron
      - 110th Communications Flight
  - 127th Wing, at Selfridge Air National Guard Base
    - 127th Comptroller Flight
    - 127th Operations Group
      - 107th Fighter Squadron, with A-10 Thunderbolt II
      - 127th Operations Support Squadron
    - 127th Maintenance Group
      - 127th Aircraft Maintenance Squadron
      - 127th Maintenance Squadron
      - 127th Maintenance Operations Flight
    - 127th Air Refueling Group
      - 171st Air Refueling Squadron, with KC-135T Stratotanker
      - 191st Operations Support Squadron
      - 191st Aircraft Maintenance Squadron
      - 191st Maintenance Squadron
      - 191st Maintenance Operations Flight
    - 127th Medical Group
      - 127th Medical Operations Flight
    - 127th Mission Support Group
      - 127th Civil Engineering Squadron
      - 127th Security Forces Squadron
      - 127th Logistics Readiness Squadron
      - 127th Force Support Squadron
      - 127th Communications Squadron

== History ==
The origins of the Michigan Air National Guard can be traced back to the 107th Aero Squadron, which was organized on 27 August 1917. The squadron assembled, serviced, and repaired aircraft during World War I. It was re-designated 801st Aero Squadron on 1 February 1918 and inactivated after the end of the war on 18 March 1919.

The Militia Act of 1903 established the present National Guard system, units raised by the states but paid for by the Federal Government, liable for immediate state service. If federalized by Presidential order, they fall under the regular military chain of command. On 1 June 1920, the Militia Bureau issued Circular No.1 on organization of National Guard air units.

It was reformed on 7 May 1926, as the 107th Observation Squadron and is oldest unit of the Michigan Air National Guard. It is one of the 29 original National Guard Observation Squadrons of the United States Army National Guard formed before World War II. The 107th Observation Squadron was ordered into active service on 15 October 1940 as part of the buildup of the Army Air Corps prior to the United States entry into World War II.

=== World War II ===
The unit was activated again on 15 October 1940, being redesignated 107th Observation Squadron with Douglas O-38 and North American O-47 observation planes. It was sent to the airfield at Camp Beauregard, Louisiana for unit training on 28 October 1940. In 1941, the 107th was joined by two other National Guard observation units to form the 67th Observation Group. The 67th Group did anti-submarine patrolling off the East Coast of the US from mid-December 1941 to March 1942, when it returned to Louisiana for training in fighter aircraft.

Under War Department policy, many of Michigan's National Guard units were detached from their former organizations and attached to other units. Such was the case for the 107th Observation Squadron, which entered service with the 32nd Division. The squadron was later attached to the 67th Fighter Reconnaissance Group and performed outstanding service in the European Theater of Operations.

The 67th Group was sent to Membury, England, in August 1942 and flew the Spitfire Mk V and Tiger Moths for a year until equipped with the F-6A Mustang. The 107th became the first operational photographic reconnaissance squadron in Northern Europe. Before the Normandy landings in June 1944, pilots of the Michigan National Guard's 107th Tactical Reconnaissance Squadron were flying photographic missions in preparation for D-Day. The squadron's pilots flew 384 missions to perform the dangerous task of photographically mapping the French coast before D-Day. Miraculously, only one aircraft was shot down from December 1943 to June 1944. Lt. Donald E. Colton was killed in action in the vicinity of Rouen, France, on 9 May 1944. For its efforts during this period, the 107th received the Presidential Unit Citation.

Assigned to support the U.S. First Army during the Normandy Campaign, the 107th became the first recon squadron to operate from French soil. The squadron flew an additional 1,800-plus missions after May 1944 and participated in four campaigns following Normandy.

=== Reorganization ===
Following their service during World War II, all Michigan National Guard units remaining in Federal service were officially deactivated by the Army. Officers and men returned to their homes as individuals rather than in units. The Michigan National Guard was again required to undertake post-war re-establishment and organization from scratch.

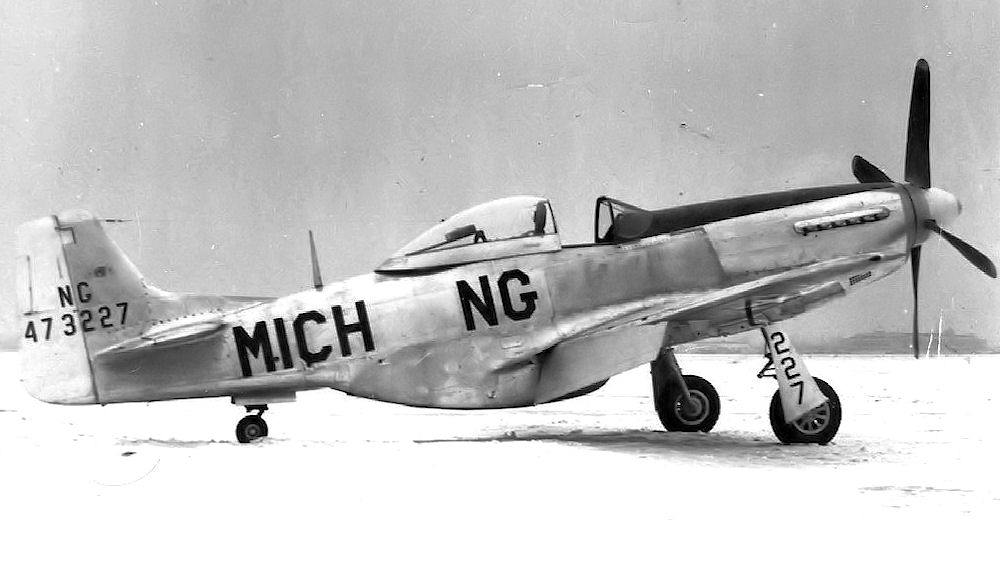
A North American P-51D Mustang of the 172d Fighter Squadron, 1946, prior to the formal establishment of the Air National Guard in September 1947

On 24 May 1946, the United States Army Air Forces, in response to dramatic postwar military budget cuts imposed by President Harry S. Truman, allocated inactive unit designations to the National Guard Bureau for the formation of an Air Force National Guard. These unit designations were allotted and transferred to various State National Guard bureaus to provide them unit designations to re-establish them as Air National Guard units.

The governor officially accepted the troop allotment assigned to Michigan by the National Defense Authority on 31 May 1946. The allotment called for 228 troop units (including 16 Air National Guard units) to be manned by 24,795 officers and men. This strength was not attained, however, because the United States War Department immediately began to scale down its plans.

Insofar as possible, units were allotted to Michigan communities that had previously sponsored National Guard units and where state-owned or leased armory facilities were available. Initial priority was given to the organization of the State Headquarters, the 46th Infantry Division, and Air National Guard units. On 29 September 1946, the first post-war units of the Michigan National Guard were activated. 18 September 1947, however, is considered the Michigan Air National Guard's official birth concurrent with the establishment of the United States Air Force as a separate branch of the United States military under the National Security Act.

Intense organizational efforts continued for the next two years. On 30 June 1948, the Adjutant General reported to the Governor that 94 percent of the first priority units had been organized and federally recognized. A total of 121 units (including 15 Air Guard units) had been organized in 40 communities with a strength of 8,818 officers and enlisted.

=== Korean War ===
The United States' second mobilization in a decade was touched off by the invasion of South Korea on 25 June 1950. 26 Michigan Army and Air National Guard units were called to active military service during the Korean War. Inducted strength of these units totaled 2,742 officers and men. All three squadrons of the 127th Fighter Wing, Michigan Air National Guard, were federalized in 1951. Two squadrons were stationed at Luke Air Force Base, Arizona. The Battle Creek squadron was assigned to Selfridge Air National Guard Base. The remaining federalized Michigan Army and Air National Guard units served in the United States, but some of their officers and men were transferred to units that eventually saw service in Korea. With the exception of those who elected to remain on active duty, most of Michigan's Guardsmen completed their tours of duty by the late spring or summer of 1952 and returned home.

=== 1990s ===
When tensions began to reach the breaking point with Kosovo refugees being forced out of their homes in Yugoslavia, In 1997 the 110th Fighter Wing took part in Operation Deny Flight in 1997. Joining with other A-10 "Thunderbolt" units from other state National Guards and active-duty Air Force personnel, the Michigan Air National Guard members formed the 104th Expeditionary Operations Group, which were deployed from mid-May to early July 1997. In 1996, air crew members and maintainers from the airlift element of the 127th Fighter Wing deployed to Germany over a period of two months to fly support shuttle missions into Bosnia as part of Operation Joint Endeavor. The fighter element of the Wing took their F-16s to Singapore for training exercises with the Singapore Air Force, and then to Hawaii to participate in RIMPAC '96, a multi-national maritime exercise.

Elements of the Michigan National Guard were some of the last to serve at U.S. military installations in Panama before the return of those facilities to the Republic of Panama. The 171st Airlift Squadron of the 127th Wing is the last Air National Guard unit to perform missions from Howard Air Force Base in Panama and members of the 1775th and 46th Military Police Companies provided law enforcement services and security as Fort Clayton, Panama was closed down.

=== War on Terror ===
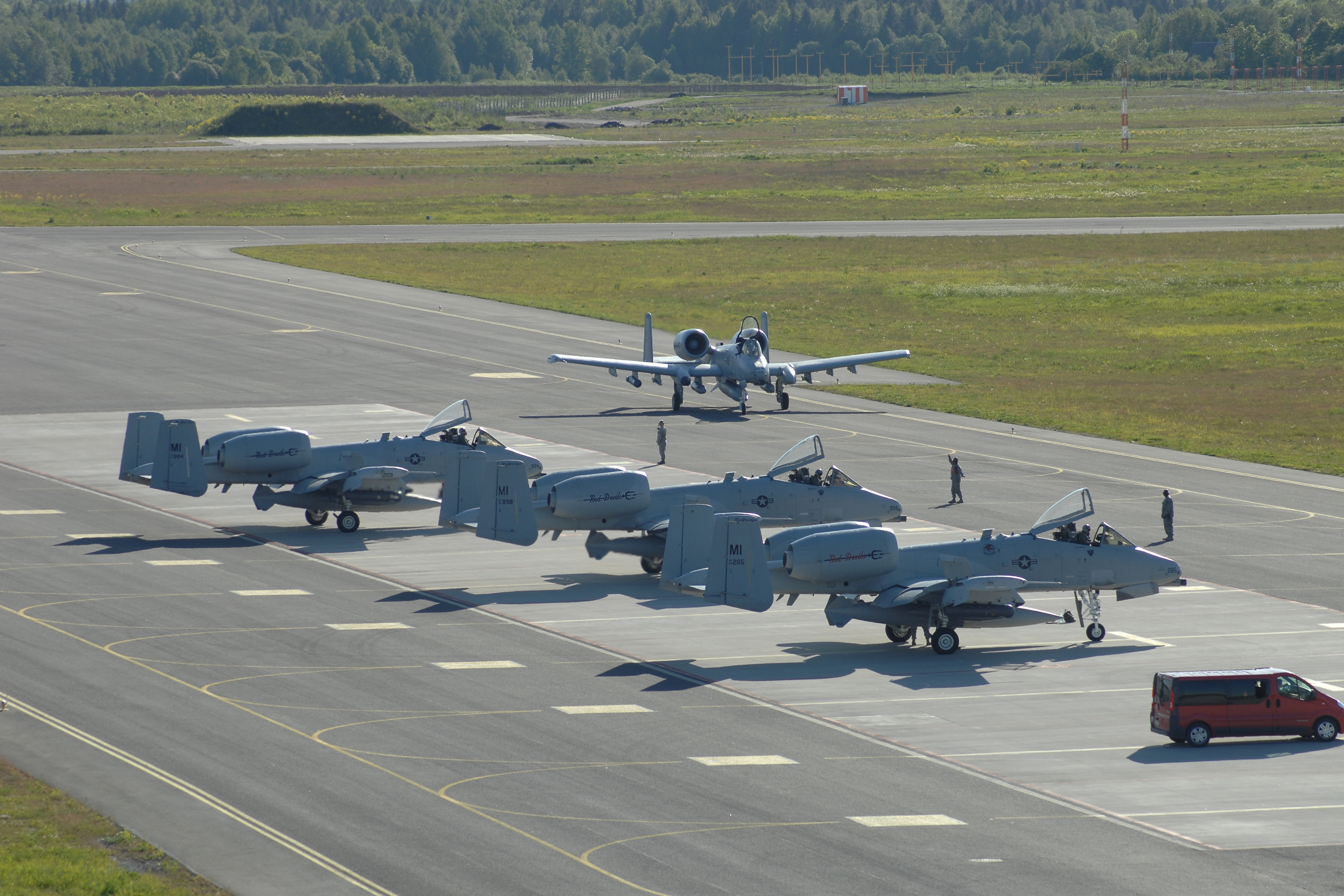
A-10 ground attack aircraft at Ämari Air Base

operated by the Estonian Defence Forces.

Michigan Air National Guard F-16s took to the skies within hours of the terrorist attacks on the World Trade Center towers and the Pentagon to fly combat air patrols over Michigan's cities. The 110th Fighter Wing had A-10 attack aircraft in service in both Iraq and Afghanistan, supporting Operation Iraqi Freedom and Operation Enduring Freedom.

== See also ==
- Michigan Volunteer Defense Force
- Michigan Wing Civil Air Patrol
