= 172nd Attack Squadron =

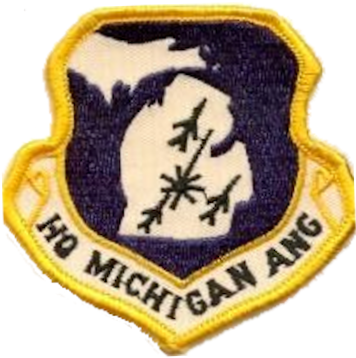
172nd Attack Squadron

- A member of the 110th Airlift Wing prepares simulated rockets for overhead C-130s at Grayling Air Gunnery Range
- Active: 1943–1945; 1947–1952; 1952– present
- Country: United States
- Allegiance: United States; Michigan
- Branch: United States Air Force; Air National Guard
- Type: Squadron
- Role: Attack
- Part of: Michigan Air National Guard
- Garrison/HQ: Kellogg Air National Guard Base, Michigan
- Engagements: European Theater of Operations

Insignia
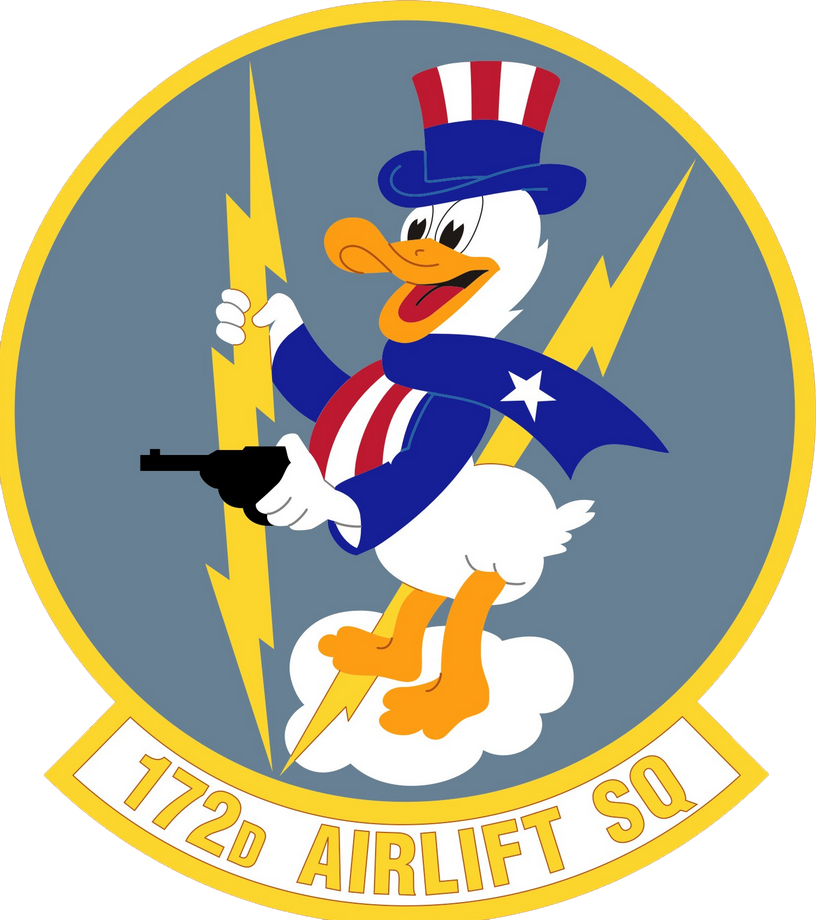
- 172nd Attack Squadron emblem

The 172nd Attack Squadron is a unit of the Michigan Air National Guard 110th Wing located at Battle Creek Air National Guard Base, Battle Creek, Michigan. The 172nd is equipped with the MQ-9 Reaper drone.

The squadron was first organized during World War II as the 375th Fighter Squadron. It saw combat in the European Theater of Operations as an element of VII Fighter Command before returning to the United States, where it was inactivated.

In May 1946, the squadron was allotted to the National Guard as the 172nd Fighter Squadron. During the Korean War, the squadron was called into federal service and acted in an air defense role until being returned to the Michigan Air National Guard in 1952. It had various flying missions, including fighter, reconnaissance and airlift until 2013, when it was converted to a support unit.

== History ==
=== World War II ===
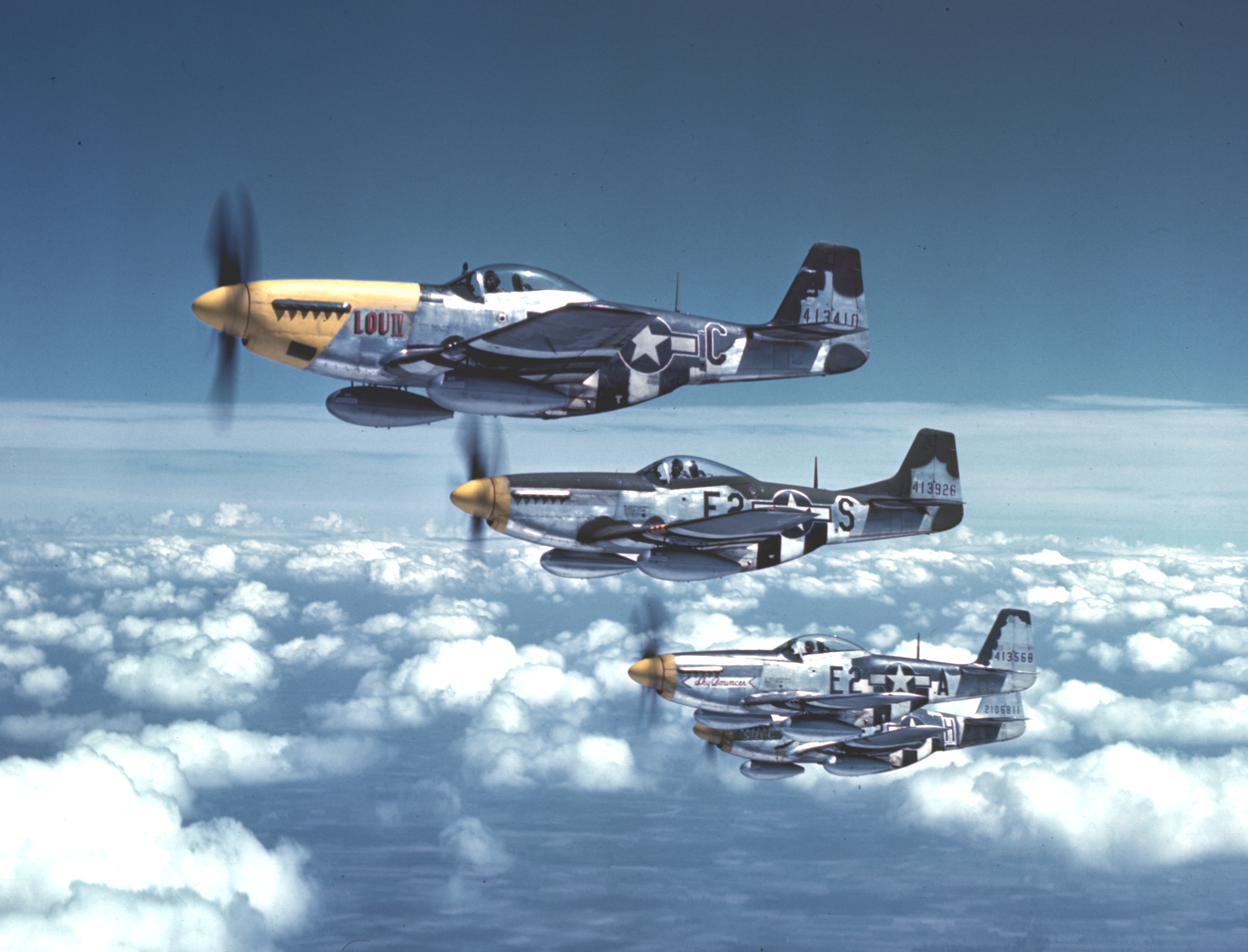
P-51 Mustangs of the 375th Fighter Squadron, 361st Fighter Group 26 July 1944

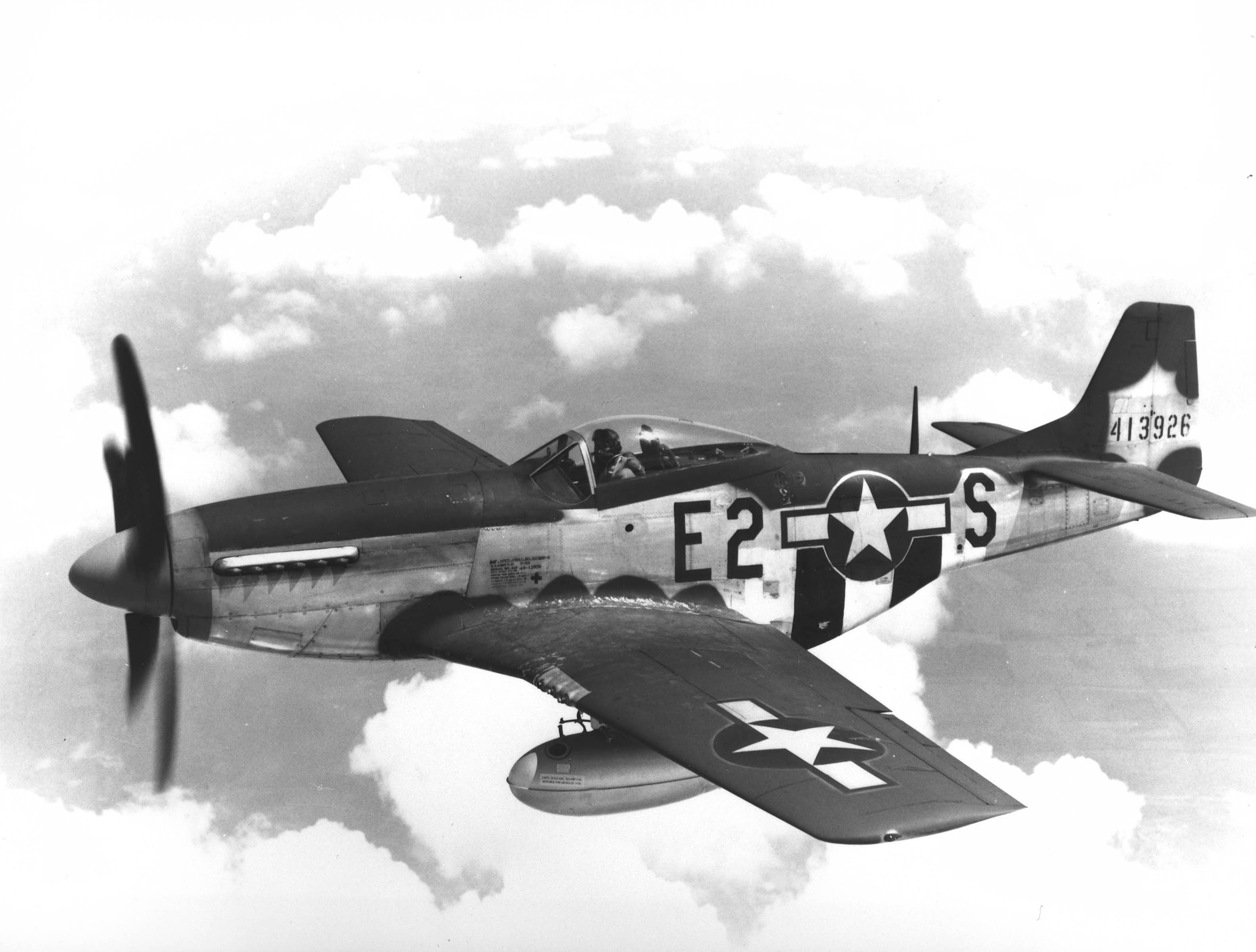
P-51D Mustang from the 375th Fighter Squadron (Note: Aircraft is North American P-51D-5-NA Mustang serial 44-13926. Aircraft crashed on 9 August 1944, and the pilot was killed.)

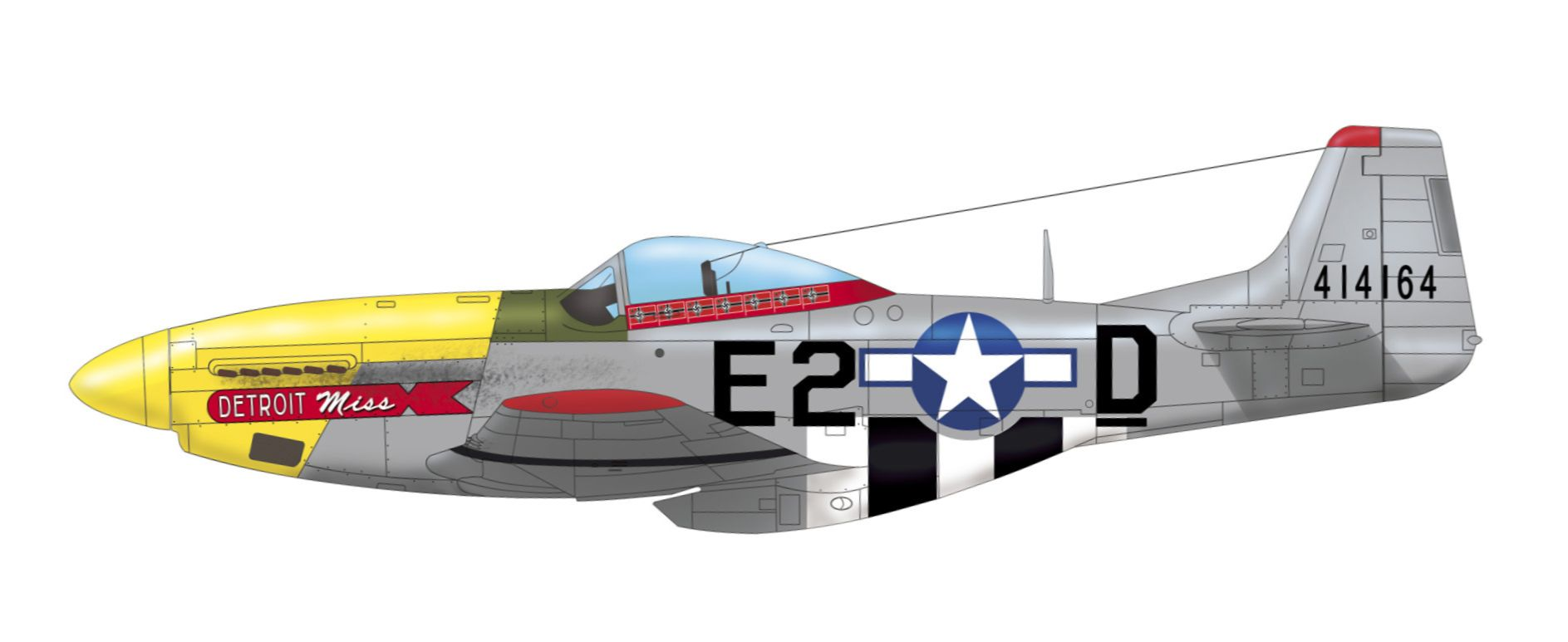
P-51D Mustang of the 375th Fighter Squadron (Note: Aircraft is North American P-51D-10-NA Mustang, serial 44-14164 Detroit Miss. Urban L. "Ben" Drew flew this aircraft in the autumn 1944 and shot down four German aircraft. He claimed six victories in total.)

The squadron was first activated at Richmond Army Air Base as the 375th Fighter Squadron and equipped with Republic P-47 Thunderbolts. The squadron trained under I Fighter Command in the mid-Atlantic states. It also flew air defense missions as part of the Philadelphia Fighter Wing. The squadron deployed to the European Theater of Operations, where it became part of VIII Fighter Command in England during November 1943.

The unit served primarily as an escort organization, covering the penetration, attack, and withdrawal of Boeing B-17 Flying Fortress and Consolidated B-24 Liberator bomber formations that Eighth Air Force sent against targets on the European continent. The squadron also engaged in counter-air patrols, fighter sweeps, and strafing and dive bombing missions. It attacked such targets as airfields, marshalling yards, V-1 flying bomb and V-2 rocket launch sites, industrial areas, ordnance depots, oil refineries, trains, and highways. During its operations, the unit participated in the assault against the Luftwaffe and the German aircraft industry during Big Week, from 20 to 25 February 1944, and the attack on transportation facilities prior to Operation Overlord, the Normandy invasion. Following the invasion it supported ground forces thereafter, including providing cover during Operation Cobra, the Saint-Lô breakout in July.

The squadron supported the airborne attack on the Netherlands in September 1944, and deployed to Chièvres Airfield, Belgium between February and April 1945, flying tactical ground support missions during the airborne assault across the Rhine. The unit returned to RAF Little Walden and flew its last combat mission on 20 April 1945. The squadron returned to the United States and was inactivated at Camp Kilmer, part of the New York Port of Embarkation, in October.

=== Michigan Air National Guard ===
In May 1946, the squadron was allotted to the National Guard as the 172nd Fighter Squadron. It was organized and equipped with North American P-51D Mustangs at Kellogg Field, Michigan in 1947. This was the same year the United States Air Force became an independent branch of the armed forces and the 172nd received its federal recognition as a National Guard squadron.

==== Activation during the Korean War ====
In February 1951 the squadron was called to active duty for the Korean War and assigned to Air Defense Command. Upon activation it was redesignated the 172nd Fighter-Interceptor Squadron and moved to Selfridge Air Force Base, Michigan, where it was assigned to the 128th Fighter-Interceptor Wing, then to the 56th Fighter-Interceptor Group. (Note: Cornett & Johnson list this assignment as to the 56th Fighter-Interceptor Wing. Cornett & Johnson, p. 123, However, neither Ravenstein nor Robertson, Patsy (13 July 2015). "Factsheet 56 Fighter Wing (AETC)". Air Force Historical Research Agency. Archived from the original on 11 August 2016. list the 172nd as a component of the 56th Wing. Ravenstein, p. 90.) However, ADC experienced difficulty under the existing wing base organizational structure in deploying its fighter squadrons to best advantage. As a result, in February 1952 the squadron was reassigned to the 4708th Defense Wing, a regional organization. The squadron was released from active service and returned to the Michigan Air National Guard on 1 November 1952 and its mission, personnel and F-51 Mustangs were transferred to the 431st Fighter-Interceptor Squadron, which activated the same day at Selfridge.

==== Return to National Guard service ====
The 172nd Fighter-Interceptor Squadron flew the F-51 Mustang until 1954. The 172nd transitioned into the North American F-86 Sabre and became the 172nd Fighter-Bomber Squadron. The Unit flew this aircraft only until 1955 before transitioned into the more sophisticated two seat Northrop F-89 Scorpion and returned to the interceptor. In 1956, the squadron became part of the newly created 110th Fighter Group. The Unit flew the F-89 Scorpion until 1958. That year the 172nd Squadron traded its F-89s for a new mission and a new aircraft, the Martin RB-57A Canberra. With the assumption of the reconnaissance mission the squadron became the 172nd Tactical Reconnaissance Squadron.

The 172nd flew RB-57A's until 1971. In 1971, the unit's mission changed again to forward air control, with the transition to the Cessna O-2 Skymaster, which it flew until 1980 when it transitioned to the Cessna OA-37 Dragonfly. The 172nd was the last Air Force or Air National Guard unit to fly the Dragonfly. The dedicated forward air control mission lasted until the 172nd transitioned to the Fairchild Republic A-10 Thunderbolt II, or Warthog, in 1991 and was returned to its first name as a National Guard unit, the 172nd Fighter Squadron.

The squadron served in several United Nations operations and contingencies throughout the world. From Bosnia, to Kosovo, to Alaska and most recently Iraq and Afghanistan, in support of Operations Iraqi Freedom and Enduring Freedom. In 2009, the squadron was realigned from a fighter squadron to become the 172nd Airlift Squadron flying the Learjet C-21. On 12 July 2013, the last C-21 departed, and the unit became a support unit as the 172nd Air Support Squadron as Battle Creek was named as the location of a control center for drone aircraft.

== Lineage ==
- Constituted as the 375th Fighter Squadron, single Engine on 28 January 1943

Activated on 10 February 1943
Inactivated on 10 November 1945

- Redesignated 172nd Fighter Squadron, Single Engine and allotted to the National Guard on 24 May 1946

Organized on 29 August 1947
Received federal recognition on 16 September 1947
Federalized and placed on active duty 10 February 1951
Designated 172nd Fighter-Interceptor Squadron on 10 February 1951
Inactivated on 1 November 1952 and returned to Michigan state control
Redesignated 172nd Fighter-Bomber Squadron on 1 November 1952 and activated
Redesignated 172nd Fighter-Interceptor Squadron on 1 July 1955
Redesignated 172nd Tactical Reconnaissance Squadron on 12 April 1958
Redesignated 172nd Tactical Air Support Squadron on 11 June 1971
Redesignated 172nd Fighter Squadron, 16 October 1991
Redesignated 172nd Airlift Squadron, 1 March 2009
Redesignated 172nd Air Support Squadron, 2013

=== Assignments ===
- 361st Fighter Group, 10 February 1943 – 10 November 1945
- 127th Fighter Group, 29 August 1947
- 128th Fighter-Interceptor Wing, 10 February 1951
- 56th Fighter-Interceptor Group, 1 May 1951
- 4708th Defense Wing, 6 February 1952 – 1 November 1952
- 127th Fighter-Bomber Group (later 127th Fighter-Interceptor Group), 1 November 1952
- 110th Fighter Group, 1 April 1956
- 127th Tactical Reconnaissance Group, 1 July 1958
- 110th Tactical Reconnaissance Group (later 110th Tactical Air Support Group, 110th Fighter Group), 1 October 1962
- 110th Operations Group, 1 October 1995 – present

=== Stations ===
- Richmond Army Air Base, Virginia, 10 February 1943
- Camp Springs Army Air Field, Maryland, 26 May 1943
- Millville Army Air Field, New Jersey, 15 August 1943
- Camp Springs Army Air Field, Maryland, 18 September 1943
- Richmond Army Air Base, Virginia, 30 September – 11 November 1943
- RAF Bottisham (AAF-374), England, 30 November 1943
- RAF Little Walden (AAF-165), England, ca. 28 September 1944

Operated from St-Dizier Airfield (A-64), France, 23 December 1944 – 1 February 1945

- Chievres Airdrome (A-84), Belgium, 1 February 1945
- RAF Little Walden (AAF-165), England, 7 April – ca. 11 October 1945
- Camp Kilmer, New Jersey, 23 – 24 October 1945
- W. K. Kellogg Airport, Michigan, 29 August 1947
- Selfridge Air Force Base, Michigan, 7 May 1951 – 1 November 1952
- W. K. Kellogg Airport (later Battle Creek Air National Guard Base), Michigan, 1 November 1952

=== Aircraft ===
- Fairchild Republic P-47 Thunderbolt (1943–1944)
- North American P-51D Mustang (1944–1945, 1947–1951)
- North American P-51H Mustang (1951–1954)
- North American F-86E Sabre (1954–1955)
- Northrop F-89C Scorpion (1955–1957)
- Martin RB-57 Canberra (1957–1971)
- Cessna O-2A Skymaster (1971–1981)
- Cessna OA-37B Dragonfly (1981–1991)
- Republic OA-10A Thunderbolt II (1991–2009)
- Learjet C-21A (2009–2013)
- MQ-9 Reaper (2013-present)

== See also ==
- F-89 Scorpion units of the United States Air Force
- List of B-57 units of the United States Air Force
- List of Sabre and Fury units in the US military
- List of United States Air Force squadrons operating the A-37 Dragonfly
- List of United States Air Force support squadrons
- List of United States Air National Guard squadrons
