= List of United States Air Force squadrons operating the A-37 Dragonfly =

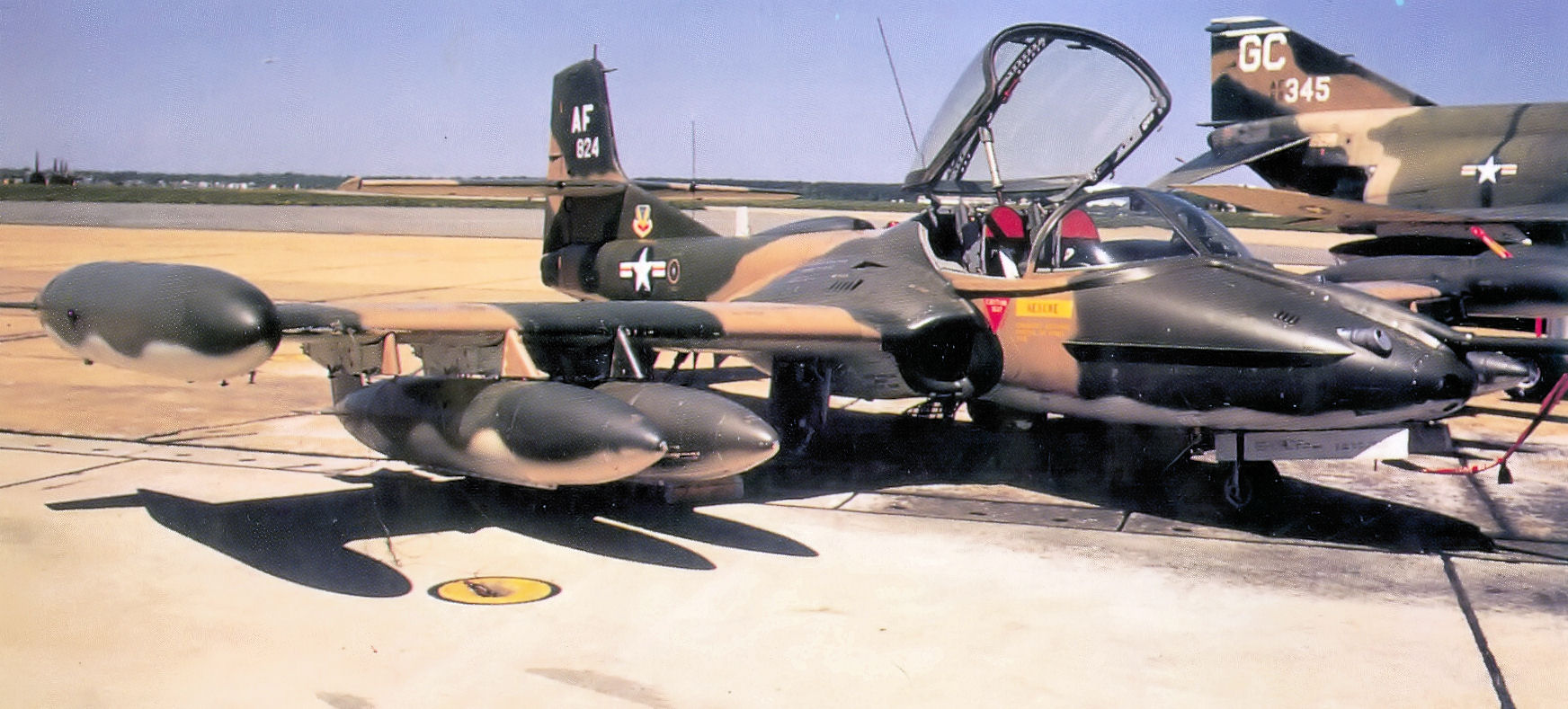
A Cessna A-37B Dragonfly of the 603d Special Operations Squadron, 1st SOW, Hurlburt Field, Florida, May 1970. It was transferred to the Republic of Vietnam Air Force, 1972.

This is a list of A-37B Dragonfly squadrons of the United States Air Force.

Cessna Aircraft built a total of 577 A-37B's. The aircraft was used for a relatively short period by the USAF; however, many aircraft had long service lives flying for the Air Force Reserves and Air National Guard. Aircraft were manufactured from 1967–1973 for USAF use; afterwards 1974–1975 for Military Assistance Program (MAP) sales primarily to South Vietnam and Latin American Air Forces.

The OA-37B Dragonfly variant was an armed observation aircraft developed during the Vietnam War. The "Dragonfly" replaced the aging Cessna O-2 Skymaster in the early 1980s. It continued in service with Air National Guard and Reserve units as an observation platform, until the 1980s.

Aircraft used by the USAF in South Vietnam were turned over to the Republic of Vietnam Air Force (VNAF) in 1972 after the USAF withdrawal as part of the "Vietnamization" program. On 28 April 1975, in the last days of the war, three VNAF A-37s captured by the North Vietnamese at Phan Rang AB attacked the VNAF-controlled Tan Son Nhut AB; approximately 95 serviceable aircraft wound up in the hands of the North Vietnamese after the South Vietnamese collapse in 1975. A-37s were used by the Vietnam People's Air Force for many years. When Vietnam invaded Cambodia in 1979, former VNAF A-37s flew most of the ground support missions and were a part of the VPAF until finally being grounded in the early 1990s. Some were put on static display in Vietnam, and 10 were auctioned in 1998. Those sold are currently owned by private companies, and individuals in America, Australia, New Zealand, and Europe.

== Active Duty Squadrons ==
Squadron	Unit Emblem	Base	Dates	Notes/Mission
6th Special Operations Training Squadron		England AFB, Louisiana	1974	Assigned to 23d Tactical Fighter Wing Tail Code: IJ
8th Special Operations Squadron		Phan Rang AB, South Vietnam; Tan Son Nhut AB, South Vietnam	1970–1972	Assigned to: 35th Tactical Fighter Wing (1970–1971); 315th Tactical Airlift Wing (1971–1972); 377th Air Base Wing, 1972; Tail Code: CF Aircraft turned over to VNAF after inactivation
19th Tactical Air Support Squadron		Osan AB, South Korea	1983–1985	Assigned to 5th Tactical Air Control Group; Flew OA-37B FAC variant. Tail Code: OS
24th Special Operations Squadron		Howard AFB, Canal Zone	1969–1972	Assigned to 24th Special Operations Wing; aircraft sold via MAP to Latin American air forces after inactivation Tail Code: HW
24th Composite Wing		Howard AFB, Canal Zone	1976–1992	Assigned directly to wing base flight; aircraft sold via MAP to Latin American air forces after inactivation; Last active-duty USAF squadron to fly the A-37 Tail Code: HW
90th Attack (later Special Operations) Squadron		Bien Hoa Air Base, South Vietnam, Nha Trang Air Base, South Vietnam, Cam Ranh Bay AB, South Vietnam	1969–1972	Assigned to 3rd Tac Fighter Wing (1969–1970); 14th Special Operations Wing (1970–1971); 483d Tactical Airlift Wing (1971–1972); Tail Code: CG Aircraft turned over to VNAF after inactivation
317th Air Commando (later: Special Operations) Squadron		England AFB, Louisiana	1967–1969	Assigned to 1st Special Operations Wing Tail Code: IK
427th Special Operations Training Squadron		England AFB, Louisiana	1970–1972	Assigned to provisional TAC 4410th Special Operations Training Group. Flew OA-37B FAC variant. Tail Code: IJ
603d Special Operations Training Squadron		Hurlburt Field, Florida	1969–1971	Assigned to 1st Special Operations Wing; Squadron inactivated on 15 May 1971, Aircraft to AFRES units. Tail Code: AF
604th Air Commando (later: Special Operations) Squadron		Bien Hoa AB, South Vietnam	1967–1970	Assigned to 3rd Tactical Fighter Wing; Aircraft reassigned to 8th Special Operations Squadron at Phan Rang AB Tail Code: EK
4352d Combat Crew Training Squadron		England AFB, Louisiana	1969–1970	TAC provisional squadron assigned to 4510th Combat Crew Training Wing; Received aircraft from inactivating 4537th CCTS. Tail Code: II
4537th Combat Crew Training Squadron		England AFB, Louisiana	1968–1969	TAC provisional squadron assigned to 1st Special Operations Wing Tail Code: II

== Air Force Reserve Squadrons ==
Squadron	Unit Emblem	Base	Dates	Notes/Mission
45th Tactical Fighter Squadron		Grissom AFB, Indiana	1973–1982	Assigned to 434th Tactical Fighter Wing; Received aircraft from inactivating 71st Special Operations Squadron. Tail Code: HO (73–79), IN (79–82)
46th Tactical Fighter Squadron		Grissom AFB, Indiana	1973–1978	Assigned to 434th Tactical Fighter Wing; Received aircraft from inactivating 72d Special Operations Squadron. Tail Code: ID
47th Tactical Fighter Squadron		Barksdale AFB, Louisiana	1973–1980	Received aircraft from 78th SOS; Assigned to 917th Tactical Fighter Group Tail Code: ES
71st Special Operations Squadron		Grissom AFB, Indiana	1971–1973	Assigned to 930th Special Operations Group Tail Code: HO
72d Special Operations Squadron		Grissom AFB, Indiana	1971–1973	Assigned to 930th Special Operations Group Tail Code: ID
78th Special Operations Squadron		Barksdale AFB, Louisiana	1972–1973	Assigned to 917th Tactical Fighter Group Tail Code: ES
706th Tactical Fighter Squadron		New Orleans NAS, Louisiana	1978–1982	Received aircraft from 46th SOS; Assigned to 926th Tactical Fighter Group Tail Code: NO
757th Special Operations Squadron		Youngstown Municipal Airport, Ohio	1971–1981	Received aircraft from 930th SOS; Assigned to 910th Special Operations Group Tail Code: IY
930th Special Operations Squadron		Clinton County AFB, Ohio (1969–1970); Lockbourne AFB, Ohio (1970–1971)	1969–1971	Assigned to 302d Special Operations Wing

== Air National Guard Squadrons ==
Squadron	Unit Emblem	Base	Dates	Notes/Mission
103d Tactical Fighter Squadron (PA)		NAS Willow Grove, Pennsylvania	1981–1988	Assigned to 111th Tactical Air Support Group, Willow Grove Air Reserve Station
104th Tactical Fighter Squadron (MD)		Martin State Airport, Maryland	1970–1979	Assigned to 175th Tactical Fighter Wing
138th Tactical Fighter Squadron (NY)		Hancock Field Air National Guard Base, New York	1970–1979	Assigned to 174th Tactical Fighter Wing
169th Tactical Air Support Squadron (IL)		Peoria Air National Guard Base, Illinois	1979–1992	Assigned to 182d Tactical Air Support Group; Flew OA-37B FAC variant.
172d Tactical Air Support Squadron (MI)		W. K. Kellogg Airport, Battle Creek, Michigan	1981–1991	Assigned to 110th Tactical Air Support Group; Flew OA-37B FAC variant.
176th Tactical Air Support Squadron (WI)		Truax Field, Madison, Wisconsin	1979–1981	Assigned to 128th Tactical Air Support Wing; Flew OA-37B FAC variant.
