= UAV FAP =

Peruvian unmanned aerial vehicle

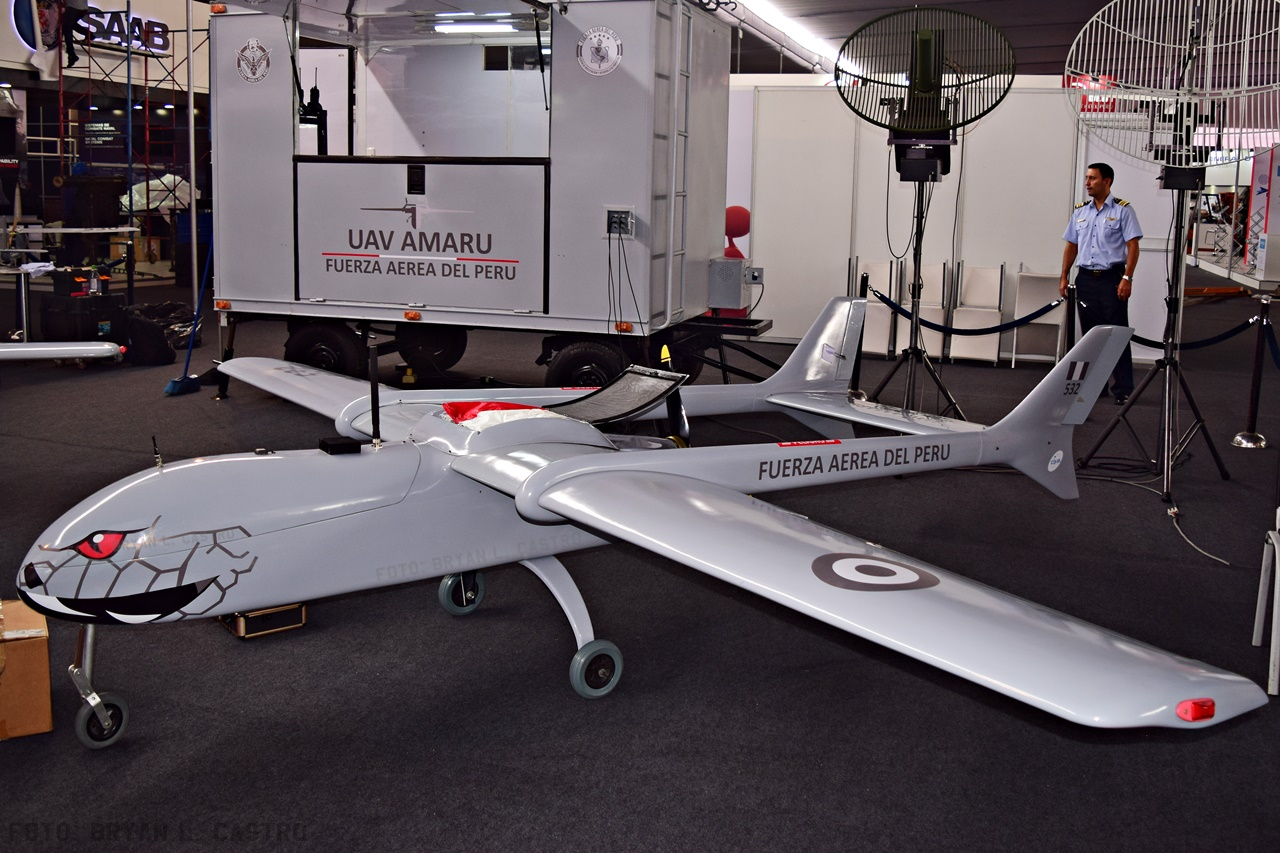

General information
- Type: Unmanned aerial vehicle
- National origin: Peru
- Manufacturer: CIDEP
- Status: In service
- Primary user: Peruvian Air Force; Peruvian Navy

History
- First flight: 2010

The UAV FAP is an unmanned aerial vehicle developed by CIDEP of the Peruvian Air Force. It primarily serves military reconnaissance and disaster response purposes.

== History ==
In 1993, the Project Research and Investigation Center (CIDEP) of the Peruvian Air Force was established to create a simulation system for the Cessna A-37 Dragonfly. The technology used to develop the simulations was eventually adapted over the turn of the 20th century toward UAV development.

On 13 March 2008, a prototype of the UAV FAP was introduced to the public. In 2010, the first UAV flights occurred.

== Uses ==
The UAV FAP serves primarily for military reconnaissance and intelligence purposes. Some UAV FAP variants are solely used for training purposes. The UAV FAP can also be used during disaster situations to survey areas from above.

== Variants ==
- UAV FAP Mk1
- UAV FAP Mk2
- UAV FAP Mk3
- UAV FAP Mk4 "Quinde"
- UAV FAP Mk5 "Ricuk"
- UAV FAP Mk6 "Amaru"
