= 110th Wing =

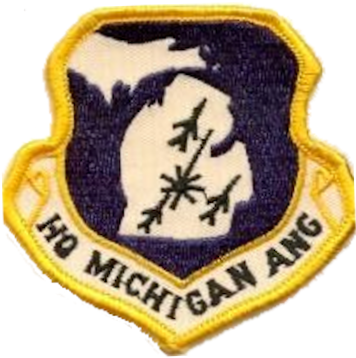
110th Wing

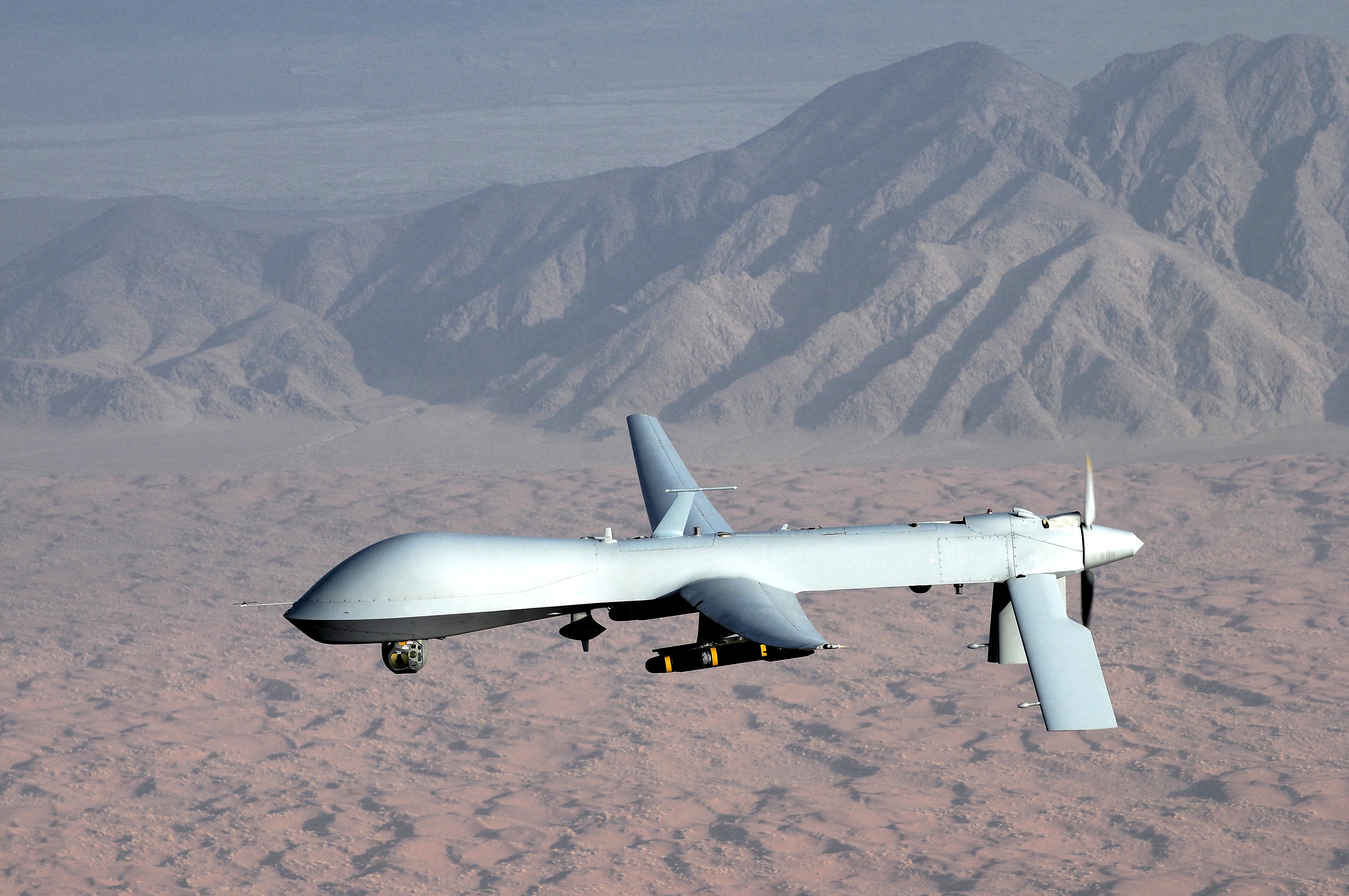
- The 110th Wing hosts an operations center for the MQ-9 Reaper remotely piloted aircraft.
- Active: 1956–1958; 1962–present
- Country: United States
- Allegiance: United States; Michigan
- Branch: United States Air Force; Air National Guard
- Type: Wing
- Part of: Michigan Air National Guard
- Garrison/HQ: Battle Creek Air National Guard Base, Battle Creek, Michigan

Commanders
- Current commander: Col James M. Rossi

Insignia
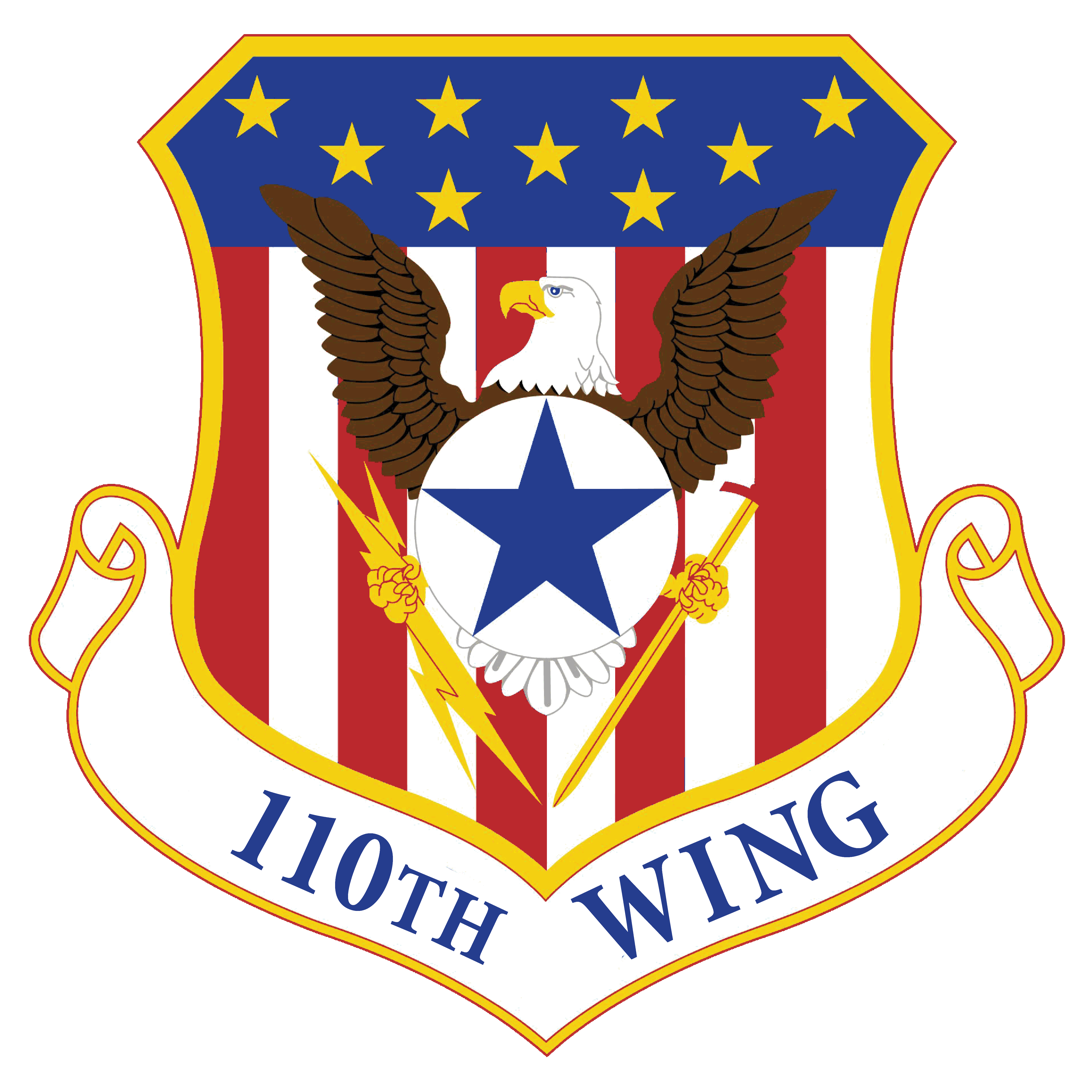
- 110th Wing emblem
- Tail code: BC

The 110th Wing is a unit of the Michigan Air National Guard, stationed at Battle Creek Air National Guard Base, Battle Creek, Michigan. If activated to federal service the Wing would be gained by the United States Air Force Air Combat Command.

== Mission ==
The main operations unit of the wing is the 110th Operations Group, a remote-split operations center for MQ-1 Predator and MQ-9 Reaper operations for Third Air Force. The aircraft and a contingent of maintainers are deployed forward, along with some pilots to handle takeoffs and landings, but the majority of the pilots remain stateside and operate the aircraft via satellite communications links.

== Organization ==
As of February 2026 the 110th Wing consists of the following units:

- 110th Wing, at Battle Creek Air National Guard Base
  - 110th Comptroller Flight
  - 110th Operations Group
    - 110th Operations Support Squadron
    - 172nd Attack Squadron, with MQ-9 Reaper
    - 272nd Cyber Operations Squadron
  - 217th Air Operations Group
    - 217th Combat Operations Squadron
    - 217th Air Communications Squadron
    - 217th Air Component Operations Squadron
    - 217th Air Intelligence Squadron
  - 110th Medical Group
  - 110th Mission Support Group
    - 110th Civil Engineering Squadron
    - 110th Security Forces Squadron
    - 110th Logistics Readiness Squadron
    - 110th Force Support Squadron
    - 110th Communications Flight

== History ==
In 1956 the 172d Fighter-Interceptor Squadron (FIS) of the Michigan Air National Guard was authorized to expand to a group level, and the United States Air Force constituted the 110th Fighter Group (Air Defense) and associated support units and allotted them to the Air National Guard for activation. The 172d FIS became the group's flying squadron. Other squadrons assigned into the group were the 110th Material Squadron, 110th Air Base Squadron, and the 110th USAF Dispensary.

In 1957, the 172d FIS received a new aircraft, the RB-57 Canberra, and a new mission – tactical reconnaissance. The resulting reorganization cost the 110th Fighter Group 40 percent of its manpower and its name – the group was inactivated and the 172d, now the 172d Tactical Reconnaissance Squadron, once again became Battle Creek's primary Air National Guard unit. The activation of a non-flying squadron, the 127th Reconnaissance Technical Squadron, helped prevent the loss of additional Guard members.

In 1962, the 110th Tactical Reconnaissance Group and support organizations were reactivated with Major Howard Strand serving as its commander. Major Strand departed in January 1965 to become deputy commander of the 127th Tactical Reconnaissance Wing at Selfridge AFB, Michigan. He returned again in 1974 to lead the 110th until 1981.

The 172d flew Canberras until 1971, when it undertook the radical and unexpected transformation from the RB-57 jets to the smaller, prop-powered Cessna O-2 Skymaster. On 11 June 1971, the 110th Tactical Reconnaissance Group became the 110th Tactical Air Support Group. In 1980, the 110th saw a return to jet power when it reequipped with OA-37 Dragonfly.

In 1991 the 110th Tactical Air Support Group transitioned from the Dragonfly to the OA-10 Thunderbolt II, and was redesignated the 110th Fighter Group. In June 1995 the 110th Fighter Group became the 110th Fighter Wing.

In 1997 the wing took part in Operation Deny Flight. The 110th Fighter Wing served in both Iraq and Afghanistan, supporting Operation Iraqi Freedom and Operation Enduring Freedom.

In May 1999 the 110th Fighter Wing was deployed to Trapani Italy in support of Operation Noble Anvil, the air operations over Kosovo.

The 110th Fighter Wing underwent a major transition moving from the A-10 aircraft to the Learjet C-21A aircraft in 2008. The C-21, which arrived in October 2008, is a twin turbofan engine passenger aircraft, the military version of the Lear Jet 35A. With a crew of two, it can accommodate eight passengers and 42 cubic feet (1,200 L) of cargo. For aero medical evacuations, it can carry one little litter or five ambulatory patients plus one flight nurse and two medical technicians. The 110th Fighter Wing was redesignated as the 110th Airlift Wing with no change in station. It changed from an Air Combat Command unit to an Air Mobility Command unit on 1 December 2009.

The base also witnessed the creation of a new unit, the 217th Air Operations Group (AOG) on 1 April 2009. The 217th AOG is an organization supporting the 17th Air Force (AFAFRICA). The 217th AOG has four squadrons that include intelligence, communications, operations and Air Force Forces planning in a largely self-contained package.

On 13 December 2014, in a ceremony presided by Gov. Rick Snyder, the wing was redesignated as the 110th Attack Wing.

On 1 March 2019, the wing was officially renamed from the 110th Attack Wing to 110th Wing by the National Guard Bureau, Washington, D.C.

== Lineage ==
- Constituted as the 110th Fighter Group (Air Defense) and allotted to the Air National Guard on 15 April 1956

Extended federal recognition and activated on 1 September 1956
Inactivated c. 12 April 1958

- Redesignated 110th Tactical Reconnaissance Group

Activated on 1 October 1962
Redesignated 110th Tactical Air Support Group on 11 June 1971
Redesignated 110th Fighter Group on 16 October 1991
Redesignated 110th Fighter Wing on 1 October 1995
Redesignated 110th Airlift Wing on 1 March 2009
Redesignated 110th Attack Wing on 13 December 2014
Redesignated 110th Wing on 1 March 2019

=== Assignments ===
- 127th Air Defense Wing, 1 September 1956 – 12 April 1958
- 127th Tactical Reconnaissance Wing, 1 October 1962
- Michigan Air National Guard, 11 June 1971
- 128th Tactical Fighter Wing (later 128th Fighter Wing), 16 October 1991
- Michigan Air National Guard, 1 October 1995

Gaining Commands

Air Defense Command, 1 September 1956 – 12 April 1958
Tactical Air Command, 1 October 1962
Air Combat Command, 1 June 1992
Air Mobility Command, 1 March 2009
Air Combat Command, 1 October 2013

=== Components ===
Groups

- 110th Operations Group, 1 June 1992 – present
- 110th Logistics Group (later 110th Maintenance Group), 1 October 1995 – 30 September 2013
- 110th Medical Group, 15 October 1962 – present
- 110th Support Group (later 110th Mission Support Group), 1 October 1995 – present
- 217th Air Operations Group, 1 April 2009 – present

Operational Squadron

- 172d Airlift Squadron, 1 September 1956 – 30 June 1957; 1 October 1962 – 1 June 1992

=== Stations ===
- W. K. Kellogg Airport, Michigan, 1 September 1956 – 30 June 1957; 1 October 1962–

Designated: Battle Creek Air National Guard Base, Michigan, 1991–present

=== Aircraft ===
- MQ-9 Reaper (2013–present)
- C-21A Learjet (2009–2013)
- A-10A Thunderbolt II (1991–2009)
- OA-10A Thunderbolt II (1991–2009)
- OA-37B Dragonfly (1981–1991)
- O-2A Skymaster (1971–1981)
- RB-57 Canberra (1962–1971)
- F-89C Scorpion (1956–1957)
