= W. K. Kellogg Airport =

Battle Creek Executive Airport at Kellogg Field (formerly W. K. Kellogg Airport)
- IATA: BTL; ICAO: KBTL; FAA LID: BTL

Summary
- Airport type: Public
- Owner: City of Battle Creek
- Serves: Battle Creek, Michigan
- Elevation AMSL: 952 ft (290 m)
- Coordinates: 42°18′23″N 85°15′00″W
- Website: http://www.battlecreekmi.gov/240/Airport

Map
- Location within Michigan Location within the United States Location within North America Location within Earth

Runways
Direction	Length		Surface
Direction	ft	m	Surface
05L/23R	10,004	3,049	Asphalt
05R/23L	4,100	1,250	Asphalt
13/31	4,835	1,474	Asphalt

Statistics (2009)
- Aircraft operations: 92,841
- Based aircraft: 93
- Sources: FAA, City of Battle Creek

Battle Creek Executive Airport at Kellogg Field, formerly W. K. Kellogg Airport (IATA: BTL, ICAO: KBTL, FAA LID: BTL) is a city-owned, public-use, joint civil-military airport located three nautical miles (6 km) west of the central business district of Battle Creek, a city in Calhoun County, Michigan, United States. The airport is accessible by road from Helmer Road, and is located near I-94. It is included in the Federal Aviation Administration (FAA) National Plan of Integrated Airport Systems for 2017–2021, in which it is categorized as a regional general aviation facility. It is also known as W. K. Kellogg Regional Airport.

In addition to general aviation, the airport supports air cargo and corporate flight operations. It is home to Western Michigan University College of Aviation, Duncan Aviation – the nation's largest family-owned aircraft refurbishing company — WACO Classic Aircraft Corporation, SEMCO Energy Gas Company, and other aviation businesses. The Battle Creek Field of Flight Air Show and Balloon Festival is also held annually at Kellogg Airport.

The 110th Wing (110 WG), a unit of the Michigan Air National Guard, uses a portion of the airport as a military installation known as Battle Creek Air National Guard Base. The 110th Wing is operationally gained by the Air Combat Command (ACC).

This airport should not be confused with the W.K. Kellogg Airport in Pomona, California, which operated from 1928 to 1932 and was then the largest privately owned airport in the country.

The airport hosts an annual Air Show & Balloon Festival featuring acts such as an F-22 Raptor demonstration.

== History ==
In September 1924, the Battle Creek Chamber of Commerce signed a five-year lease of a farm, with the option to purchase, for an aviation field.

The airport opened in 1925 and was owned by W.K. Kellogg, who donated $60,000 to purchase the land option and pay for airport improvements and equipment over the first few years.

The airport received its first air mail flight in the summer of 1928 and its first regular passenger service in 1929. The first air traffic control tower was installed at the airport in 1935, becoming the first of its kind in Michigan outside of Detroit.

During the Second World War, the airfield was used by the United States Army Air Forces. In August 1943 the 394th Bombardment Group arrived here for training before dispatch overseas to the United Kingdom in 1944. In 1947, the airport was designated as the base for the 172nd Fighter Squadron for the Michigan Air National Guard.

In May 2010, construction began on a new $7.2 million, 4,100 feet (1,250 m) long by 75 feet (23 m) wide runway parallel to existing runway 05/23. The new runway designated 05R-23L opened July 7, 2011.

In 2019, the WACO Aircraft Co announced an $18 million expansion at the airport set for completion in the spring of 2020. The company built a new facility to include a reception area for transiting pilots, larger space for mechanics, and a restaurant opened to the public. The company also dedicated space for an aerospace engineering department.

That same year, Western Michigan University's College of Aviation announced plans for a new instructional facility at the airport to include classroom space, a computer room, composites/paint laboratory upgrades, a new flight simulation center, a research center, briefing rooms, office space, a café, and more.

In December 2019 the airport was renamed by the Battle Creek City Commission as the Battle Creek Executive Airport at Kellogg Field.

In March 2022, Battle Creek leaders expressed desire to build a drone park at the airport for future commercial drone use. The airport received a $150,000 grant from the Michigan Economic Development Corporation in 2019 to conduct a feasibility study for development of an unmanned aircraft systems business section west of the airport. Military drones already operate at the airport: the Michigan Air National Guard operates the MQ-9 Reaper.

== Facilities and aircraft ==
W. K. Kellogg Airport covers an area of 1,500 acres (607 ha) at an elevation of 952 feet (290 m) above mean sea level. It has three asphalt paved runways: 05L/23R is 10,004 by 150 feet (3,049 m × 46 m); 05R/23L is 4,100 by 75 feet (1,250 m × 23 m); 13/31 is 4,835 by 100 feet (1,474 m × 30 m).

The airport has two fixed-base operators offering fuel as well as general maintenance, catering, courtesy transportation, conference rooms, a crew lounge, and more.

For the 12-month period ending October 31, 2021, the airport had 96,000 aircraft operations, an average of 263 per day: 68% general aviation, 31% air taxi, 1% military, and <1% commercial. For the same time period, there are 84 aircraft based on the field: 69 single-engine and 14 multi-engine airplanes as well as 1 jet.

== Accidents & Incidents ==
- On April 5, 2006, a Waco EQC-6 crashed during an aborted takeoff when the airplane veered sharply left on the takeoff roll. The right wing and right horizontal stabilizer impacted the runway. The pilot said before that he did not verify rudder operation during his preflight inspection, and it was later found that the rudder control cables were rigged backwards because the maintenance had failed to properly install them.
- On June 19, 2007, a Cessna 195 was damaged during a ground loop on Runway 31 at Kellogg. The pilot reported that, on his third touch-and-go, he flared the airplane into a flat attitude to ease it down onto the runway. The airplane bounced twice and started turning left. The pilot attempted applying right rudder to correct the turn, but the plane kept veering left. The aircraft ground-looped, the main left landing gear collapsed, and the plane exited the right side of the runway. The probable cause was found to be the pilot's failure to maintain directional control of the aircraft during the landing roll which resulted in a ground loop.
- On June 8, 2008, a Piper PA-44 Seminole was substantially damaged when a propeller blade tip separated and impacted the plane's nose during cruise flight en route to and near Kellogg. The probable cause was found to be metal fatigue resulting from inadequate inspection and repair.
- On July 2, 2011, a Wingtip to Wingtip, LLC model Panzl S-330 crashed when the entire left aileron separated during an aerobatic flight over the airport. The pilot landed safely without further incident. The probable cause was found to be an inadequate aileron hinge design, which resulted in the in-flight separation of the left aileron following a fatigue failure of the center hinge rod-end.
- On July 20, 2011, a Cirrus SR20 crashed while landing at Kellogg. The pilot executed a go-around on his first approach since his approach angle was too high and came in lower on the second attempt. The airplane experienced a hard landing, so the pilot again added power and retracted flaps partially to go around, but the aircraft veered off the runway and impacted terrain and a fence. The probable cause was found to be the student pilot's improper flare which resulted in a hard landing.
- On March 27, 2012, a Cessna 441 Conquest departed from Battle Creek with a tow bar still attached to its landing gear. It was found a ground maintenance technician had declined to remove it after towing the plane out of the hangar.
- On August 27, 2015, a Barrow Ted A One Easy crashed after two landing attempts at Kellogg. On the second attempt, the aircraft impacted a grass field near a runway and caught fire.

== See also ==
- List of airports in Michigan
- Michigan World War II Army Airfields
