= Cessna A-37 Dragonfly =

American light attack aircraft developed from the T-37 Tweet basic trainer

A-37 Dragonfly
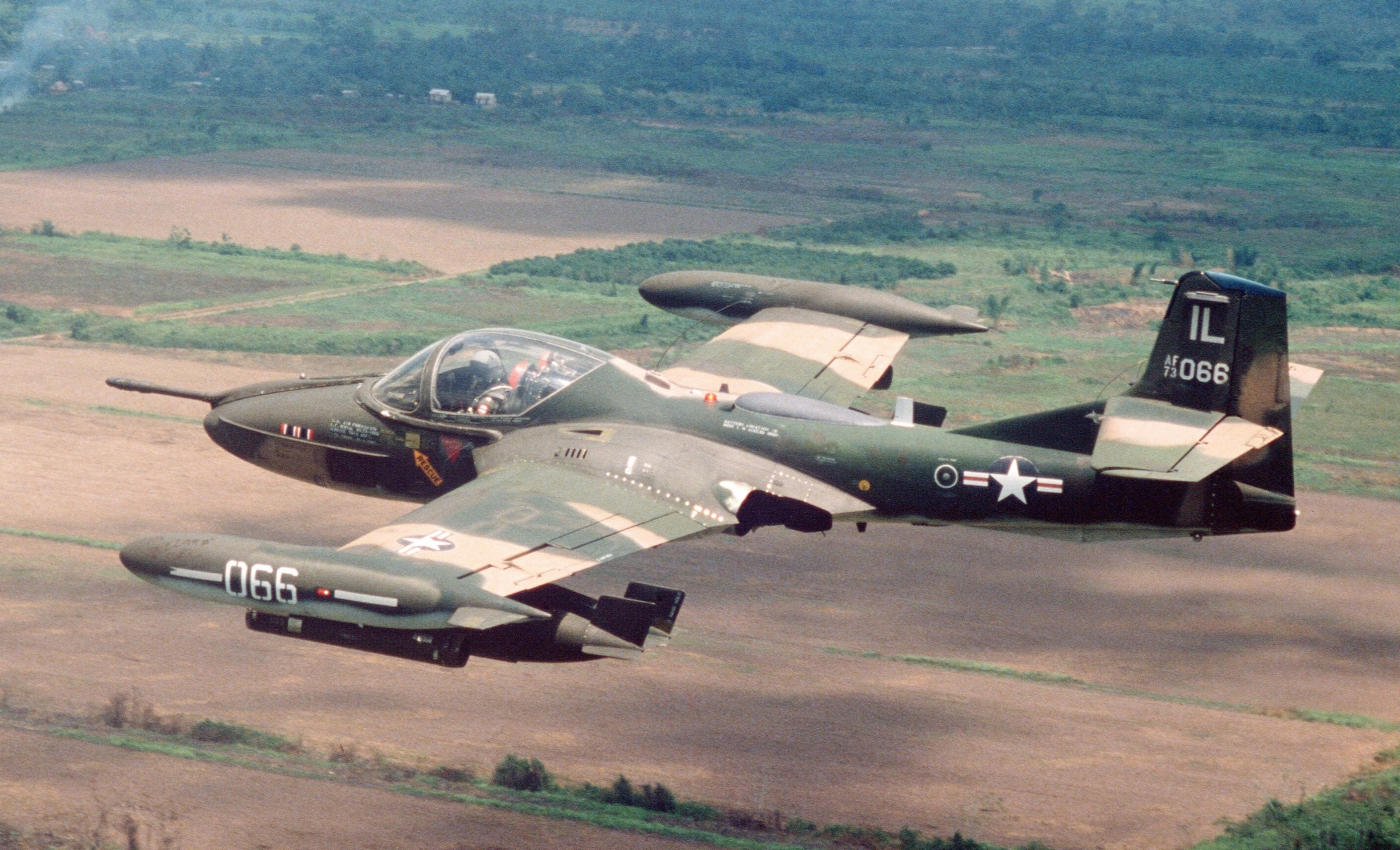
- An OA-37B Dragonfly aircraft from the Illinois Air National Guard during Exercise GRANADERO I, 14 May 1984

General information
- Type: Light ground-attack aircraft
- National origin: United States
- Manufacturer: Cessna
- Status: Limited service in Central American and South American air forces
- Primary users: United States Air Force (historical) Republic of Vietnam Air Force (historical); Chilean Air Force (historical); Peruvian Air Force
- Number built: 577

History
- Manufactured: 1963–1975
- First flight: October 1964
- Developed from: Cessna T-37 Tweet

The Cessna A-37 Dragonfly, or Super Tweet, is a jet-powered, light attack aircraft that was designed and produced by American aircraft manufacturer Cessna.

It was developed during the Vietnam War in response to military interest in new counter-insurgency (COIN) aircraft to replace aging types such as the Douglas A-1 Skyraider. A formal United States Air Force (USAF) evaluation of the T-37 Tweet basic trainer for the COIN mission was conducted in late 1962, after which the USAF concluded that it could be modified to effectively perform the role. The attack-oriented A-37 was directly derived from the T-37, roughly doubling in both all-up weight and engine thrust to permit considerable quantities of munitions to be carried, along with extended flight endurance and additional mission avionics. The prototype YAT-37D performed its maiden flight during October 1964.

While test results were positive, a production contract was not immediately forthcoming until an uptick in combat intensity and aircraft losses became apparent. An initial batch of 25 A-37As was deployed to Vietnam under the "Combat Dragon" evaluation program in August 1967, flying from Bien Hoa Air Base on various missions, including close air support, helicopter escort, forward air control (FAC), and night interdiction. The type proved itself to be effective in the theater, leading to the USAF issuing a contract to Cessna for an improved Super Tweet, designated the A-37B, in early 1967. It was largely operated over South Vietnam, as well as in neighboring Laos and Cambodia, typically flying close air support missions in coordination with US ground forces. The A-37 proved to be relatively low-maintenance and accurate and suffered relatively few combat losses.

Following the end of the conflict, the USAF's A-37Bs were transferred from the Tactical Air Command (TAC) to TAC-gained units in the Air National Guard and Air Force Reserve. The type was assigned to the FAC role and given the designation OA-37B. The type was eventually phased out in the 1980s and '90s, having been replaced in the FAC mission by the more formidable Fairchild Republic A-10 Thunderbolt II in American service. Various international operators, many of which were South American countries, also operated the A-37; it saw active use during the Salvadoran Civil War. Over 200 aircraft were also supplied to the Republic of Vietnam Air Force (RVNAF), and numerous A-37Bs were captured by North Vietnamese forces near the conflict's end.

== Design and development ==
During the early 1960s, American military involvement in Vietnam was growing, leading to strong interest from military officials in COIN aircraft. Existing platforms such as the Douglas A-1 Skyraider were less than fully satisfactory, in part because younger pilots, having been trained and used to flying jet aircraft, had difficulties adapting to the A-1's increasingly uncommon features for a frontline combat aircraft, such as a radial engine and a "taildragger" landing gear arrangement. At the time, the Cessna T-37 Tweet was in widespread use by the military as a basic trainer aircraft. In late 1962, the USAF's Special Air Warfare Center at Eglin Air Force Base's Hurlburt Field in Florida evaluated two T-37Cs for the mission.

The USAF determined the T-37 to be a promising COIN aircraft and expressed its interest in a prospective improved version that would be able to carry a much larger payload along with greater endurance and better short-field performance. These requirements meant the aircraft would have to be considerably heavier and thus necessitate the use of more powerful engines. To account for the drastic increase in airframe weight along with the need to a significant payload, as well, Cessna opted to double the aircraft's engine power by replacing its twin Continental J-69 engines with General Electric J85-J2/5 turbojet engines, each capable of generating up to 2,400 lbf (11 kN) of thrust. During 1963, the USAF awarded a contract to Cessna to produce two prototype aircraft, designated YAT-37D; these were essentially heavily modified T-37s.

Specific alterations made for the YAT-37D included the adoption of strengthened wings, the use of larger wingtip fuel tanks of 360 litres (95 US gal) capacity, additional avionics suitable for battlefield communications, navigation, and targeting, toughened landing gear that was suitable for rough-field operation, and the fitting of a General Electric-supplied GAU-2B/A 7.62 mm (0.300 in) "Minigun" Gatling-style machine gun capable of a rate of fire of 3,000 rounds/minute and 1,500 rounds of ammunition that was installed in the right side of the aircraft's nose behind a large access panel, along with an accompanying gunsight and gun camera. Perhaps most importantly, three stores pylons were installed on each wing that were compatible with a wide range of munitions.

During October 1964, the first YAT-37D performed its maiden flight, followed one year later by the second prototype. The second prototype was equipped with four stores pylons under each wing as opposed to three, the first prototype was subsequently upgraded to this configuration, as well. Test results were good, but the USAF's interest in COIN aircraft had decreased over time. The program went into limbo for a time, with the second prototype "put out to pasture" at the National Museum of the United States Air Force at Wright-Patterson Air Force Base in Ohio.

The conflict in Southeast Asia continued to escalate during the mid-1960s. Losses of Douglas A-1 Skyraider close-support aircraft in the USAF, United States Navy, and RVNAF service proved to be greater than anticipated, which led to a revival in the USAF's interest in COIN aircraft. The YAT-37D seemed like a promising candidate for the role, yet the USAF felt that the only means of being certain was to evaluate the aircraft in real-world combat. At the time, this was a relatively unorthodox approach to military aircraft procurement. The USAF issued a contract to Cessna for a preproduction batch of 39 YAT-37Ds, opting for only a few minor changes relative to the prototypes, to be rebuilt from existing T-37Bs. These aircraft were initially designated AT-37D, but the designation was quickly changed to A-37A. The second prototype YAT-37D was pulled out of the USAF Museum and upgraded to A-37A standards as part of the test program.

The A-37A had a gross takeoff weight of 12,000 lb (5,400 kg), of which 2,700 lb (1,200 kg) were ordnance. It was a relatively simple aircraft, avoiding any advanced weapon systems or the need for a complex training program to operate. The A-37A retained the dual controls of its T-37B ancestor, allowing it to be used as an operational trainer. In combat FAC operations, the second seat was occupied by an observer. Only a single crewman normally flew in the aircraft for close-support missions, which permitted a slight increase in ordnance.

== Operational history ==
=== Vietnam War ===
In August 1967, 25 A-37As were deployed to Vietnam under the "Combat Dragon" evaluation program, and flew from Bien Hoa Air Base on USAF "air commando" missions, including CAS, helicopter escort, FAC, and night interdiction. Combat loads included high-explosive bombs, cluster munition dispensers, unguided rocket packs, napalm tanks, and the SUU-11/A Minigun pod. For the majority of missions, the aircraft also carried two additional external fuel tanks on the inner stores pylons.

During this period, the A-37As flew thousands of sorties; none was lost to enemy fire, although two were wrecked in landing accidents. While the aircraft was formally named the "Dragonfly", many pilots called it the "Super Tweet". The Combat Dragon program was successful, but unsurprisingly, the combat evaluation revealed some of the deficiencies of the A-37A. The most noticeable problem was that the aircraft lacked range and endurance. Other concerns were heavy control response during attack runs (the flight controls were not power-boosted) and the vulnerability of the aircraft's nonredundant flight-control system. Some pilots also criticized the machine gun as ineffective and negatively impacting the pilot's view.

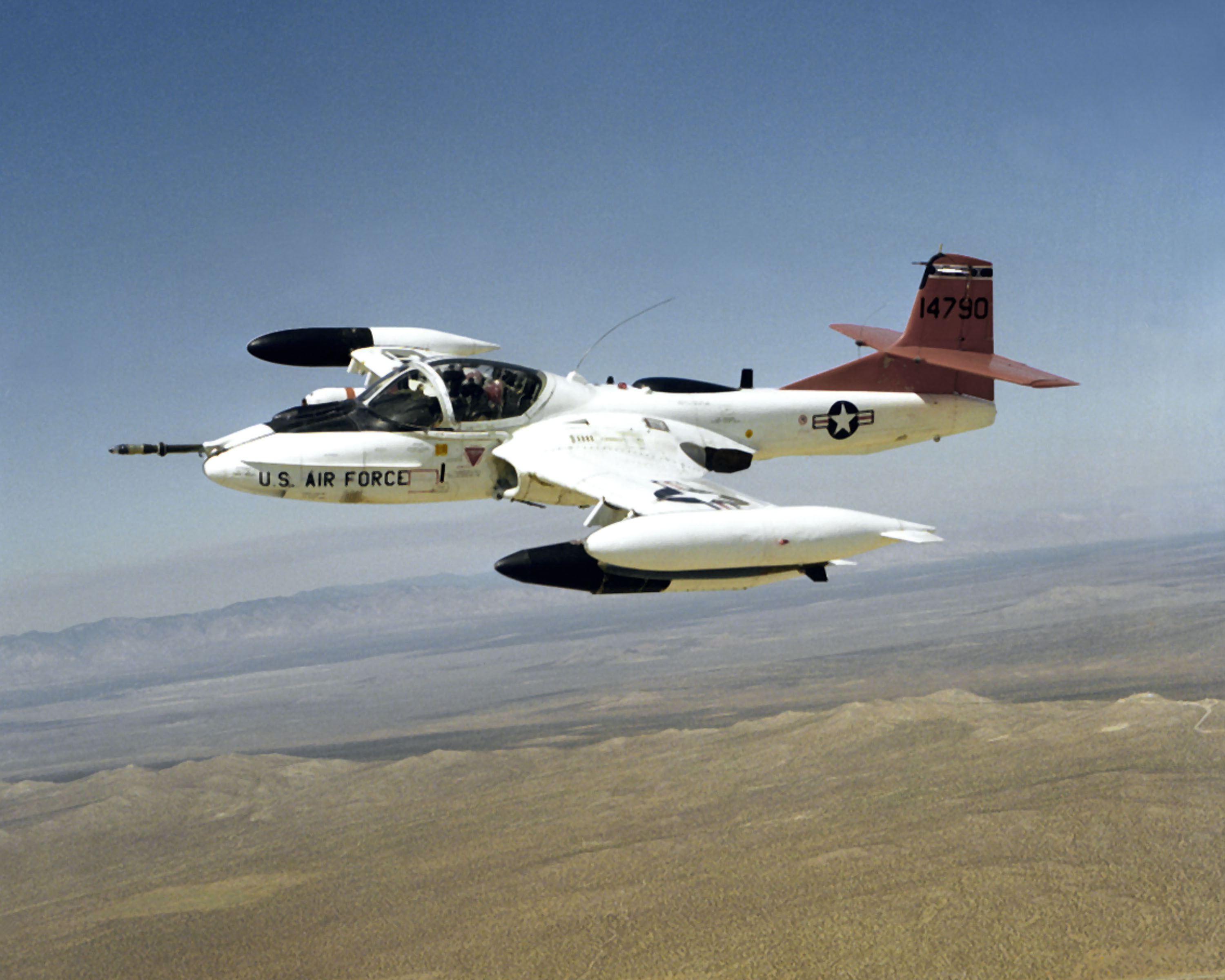
An OA-37 Dragonfly aircraft over Edwards AFB, California

The USAF signed a contract with Cessna in early 1967 for an improved Super Tweet, designated the A-37B. The initial order was for 57 aircraft, but this was quickly increased to 127; the unit cost of these aircraft was roughly one-quarter of the McDonnell Douglas F-4 Phantom II all-weather fighter aircraft. The A-37Bs were primarily intended to be supplied to the RVNAF as replacements for their A-1 Skyraiders. The A-37B prototype first flew in September 1967, with deliveries to the South Vietnamese beginning in November 1968.

The A-37Bs were all newly built airframes that were considerably stronger than those of the A-37A, capable of pulling six g instead of five, and were built to have a longer fatigue life of 4,000 hours. Field experience would demonstrate that 7,000 hours between overhauls could be tolerated. The A-37B weighed almost twice as much as the T-37C; a remarkable fraction of the loaded weight, 5,800 lb (2,600 kg), could be external stores. In practice, the A-37B usually operated with at least two and sometimes four underwing fuel tanks to improve combat endurance. The A-37B added a refueling probe to the nose, leading to pipes wrapped around the lower lip of the canopy, for probe-and-drogue aerial refueling. This was an unusual fit for USAF aircraft, which traditionally are configured for boom refueling. Other improvements included updated avionics, a redesigned instrument panel to make the aircraft easier to fly from either seat, an automatic engine inlet de-icing system, and revised landing gear. Like its predecessors, the A-37B was not pressurized.

To accommodate the increased weight, the A-37B was powered by General Electric J85-GE-17A engines, providing 2,850 lbf (12.7 kN) thrust each. These engines were canted slightly outward and downward to improve single-engine handling. Air commando pilots in Vietnam operating the A-37A had found single-engine cruise an effective means of improving their flight endurance. Modifications were made to control surfaces to improve handling. To improve aircraft and crew survivability, the A-37B was fitted with redundant elevator control runs that were placed as far apart as possible. The ejection seats were armored, the cockpit was lined with nylon flak curtains, and foam-filled self-sealing fuel tanks were installed. To extend endurance, pilots were authorized to fly the A-37 on only one active engine, an uncommon practice outside of emergency situations at that time.

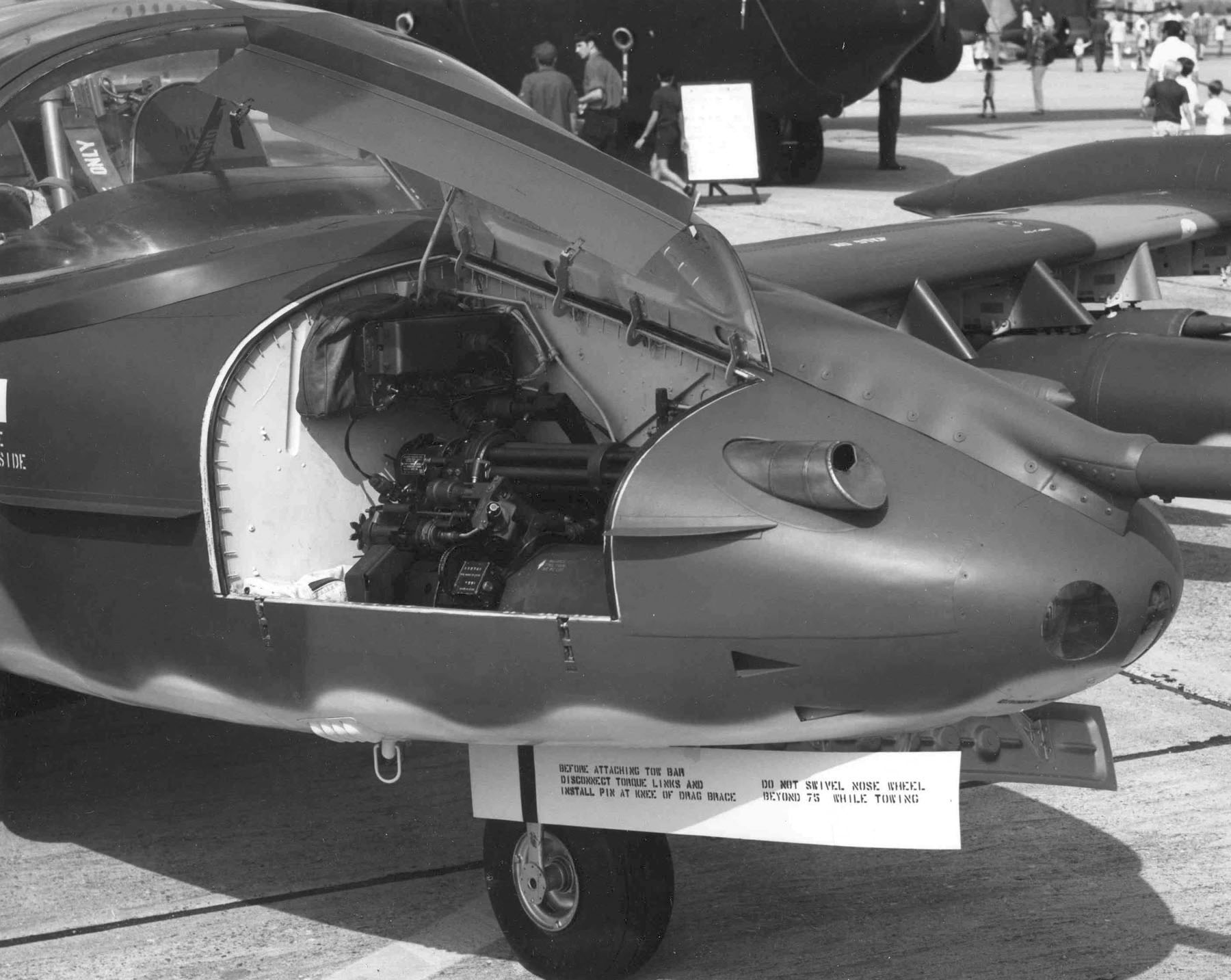
A-37B Minigun in nose compartment

The 20 mm (0.787 in) GPU-2/A and AMD 30 mm (1.18 in) cannon pods were tested with favorable results on the A-37B, but reports indicate that such pods were either seldom or never used in operation.

The A-37 proved to excel at the close air support mission. It was able to engage targets at speeds roughly 100 miles per hour slower than swept-wing fighters, which improved its bombing accuracy; pilots were reportedly able to achieve an average accuracy of 45 feet (14 m). While the aircraft's slow speed was feared to make it more vulnerable to hostile ground fire, the A-37's relatively small size, atypical speeds, and relatively low altitudes combined to make it somewhat hard to hit effectively with gunfire. The A-37 required a relatively low level of maintenance compared to contemporary fighters—only two hours of maintenance for each hour of flight time, one-sixth as much as that of the McDonnell F-101 Voodoo, partially due to the convenient placement of multiple access panels at strategic locations.

The A-37 did not typically attract attention from the media, unlike many other USAF combat aircraft used in the theater; one reason for this was that the type was never flown into North Vietnam, where hostile air defenses were proved to be challenging, claiming to have downed almost 200 F-4s and 300 F-105s by the conflict's end. Instead, A-37s operated in the south, as well as in neighboring Laos and Cambodia, where it was typically used to support US ground forces.

A total of 577 A-37Bs was constructed, 254 of which being delivered to the RVNAF. By the war's end, the A-37 had flown over 160,000 combat sorties, during which only 22 USAF aircraft were recorded as lost due to combat. The type remained active in the theater until the Fall of Saigon, shortly prior to which efforts were made to retrieve as many as possible before they fell into North Vietnamese hands. As a consequence of the North Vietnamese capture of Da Nang Air Base at the end of March 1975, their forces captured large amounts of stores and equipment, including 33 intact A-37s. On 28 April 1975, several of these captured A-37s were used by the North Vietnamese to attack Tan Son Nhut Air Base, still held by the South Vietnamese.

==== Post-Vietnam era ====
Around 187 A-37Bs are believed to have been in RVNAF service by the Fall of Saigon in April 1975; 92 of these were recovered by the US, while the other 95 aircraft would be operated by the Vietnam People's Air Force in missions over Cambodia and during the China conflict in 1979. These "renegade" aircraft were phased out of service in the late 1970s or early 1980s, likely due to the lack of spare parts. Some of these captured A-37s were shipped to Vietnam's then-Communist allies such as Czechoslovakia, Poland, the Soviet Union, and East Germany. Others were sold to private foreign owners; six A-37Bs became the property of American warbird fans, while four A-37Bs became privately owned by individuals in Australia and New Zealand.

Following the conflict's end, the USAF opted to transfer their A-37Bs from the USAF TAC to TAC-gained units in the Air National Guard and Air Force Reserve. During the early 1980s, these aircraft were assigned to the FAC role and given the designation OA-37B. The OA-37Bs were eventually phased out in the 1980s and '90s and replaced in the FAC mission by the much more formidable Fairchild Republic A-10 Thunderbolt II in USAF, Air National Guard, and USAF Reserve service.

OA-37s from the 24th Composite Wing's (later 24th Wing's) 24th Tactical Air Support Squadron also saw service during Operation Just Cause, the United States invasion of Panama in December 1989.

=== Salvadoran Civil War ===
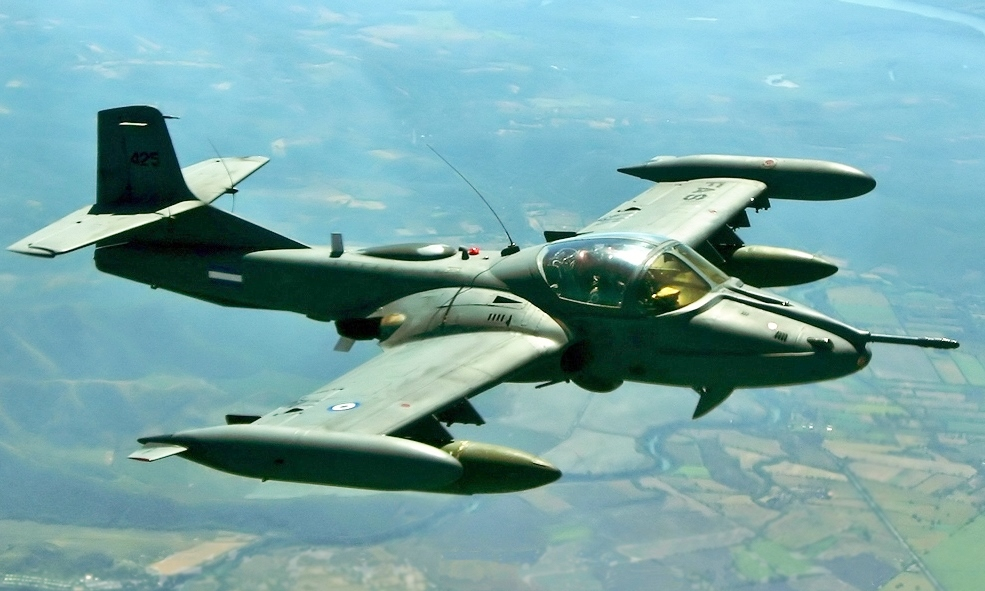
An FAS A-37 Dragonfly in flight over Mexico

A-37Bs were used extensively by the Salvadoran Air Force during the Salvadoran Civil War, supplied by the United States in 1983 as a replacement for the Salvadoran Air Force's Dassault Ouragans, several of which had been destroyed on the ground by the FMLN. A-37Bs were used to bomb rebel bases, columns, and towns, provided CAS, and flew interdiction missions. A total of 21 A-37Bs and 9 OA-37Bs was supplied during the war, one of which was lost on November 18, 1989 when fire from a Dragunov sniper rifle killed the co-pilot, causing the pilot to eject, and another that was shot down by an SA-7 missile on November 23, 1990. Nine A-37s remained in operational condition by the end of the war.

=== Other Latin American countries ===
The A-37B was also exported to Latin America, mostly during the 1970s. It was well suited to their needs because of its simplicity, low cost, and effectiveness for insurgent warfare. Most of the A-37Bs exported south had the refueling probe shortened to act as a single-point ground-refueling probe or deleted completely.

During the late 1970s, amid rising tensions between Argentina and Chile over conflicting territorial claims, commonly referred to be as the Beagle conflict, the Chilean Air Force retrofitted their T-37s into an armed configuration near identical to that of the A-37. In anticipation of a need for additional combat aircraft, the service subsequently procured A-37s from the United States, as well.

The Guatemalan Air Force flew the A-37 in extensive counter-insurgency operations throughout the 1970s-1990s, losing one aircraft in action in 1985. The type has also been widely used for counter-narcotics operations.

During the mid-1970s, 36 A-37Bs were procured for the Peruvian Air Force. On 10 February 1995, a Peruvian A-37 was shot down by an Ecuadorian Air Force IAI Kfir over a border dispute. On 20 April 2001, a Peruvian A-37B shot down a civilian Cessna A185E floatplane with a minigun under surveillance by CIA controllers who advised against engaging—-according to the story version created by the CIA to cover their violation of Presidential conditions on their conduct. The Peruvian controller had the final authority in this situation, and he believed that the flight was carrying drugs out of the country, so he ordered the A-37 pilot to open fire. (See author Tim Weiner’s explanation in his book The Mission). As a result, a US missionary and her daughter were killed. The Cessna A185E crash-landed in a river where locals in their boats helped the passengers.

== Variants ==
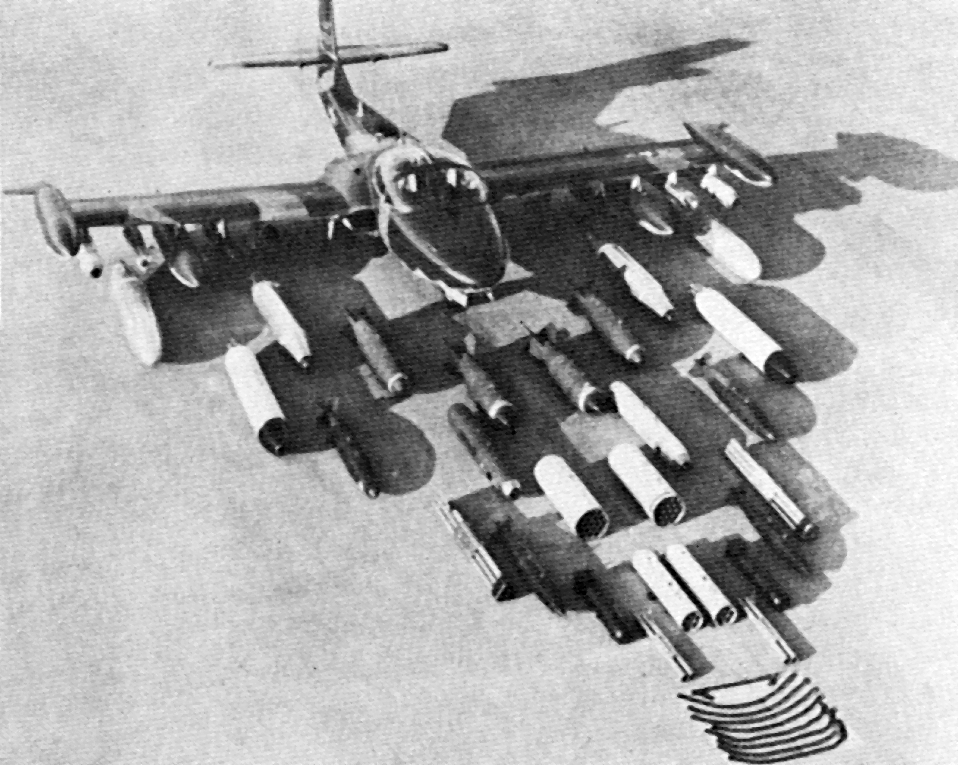
Cessna A-37A weapon load display.

YAT-37D
Two former T-37C trainer prototypes converted for counter-insurgency operations with two J-85-GE engines and six underwing pylons as prototypes for the A-37 series, redesignated YA-37A.
YA-37A
Two YAT-37D prototypes redesignated.
A-37A
(Cessna Model 318D) T-37B rebuilt with two J-85-GE-5 engines, a 7.62 mm Minigun in nose and eight underwing stores pylons, 39 conversions.
A-37B
(Cessna Model 318E) Production version with two J-85-GE-17A engines, provision for inflight refuelling, increased fuel capacity and strengthened airframe, 577 built.
OA-37B
The OA-37B Dragonfly was an armed observation aircraft developed during the Vietnam War.
B.J.6
(Thai: บ.จ.๖) Thai designation for the A-37B.

== Operators ==
=== Current ===
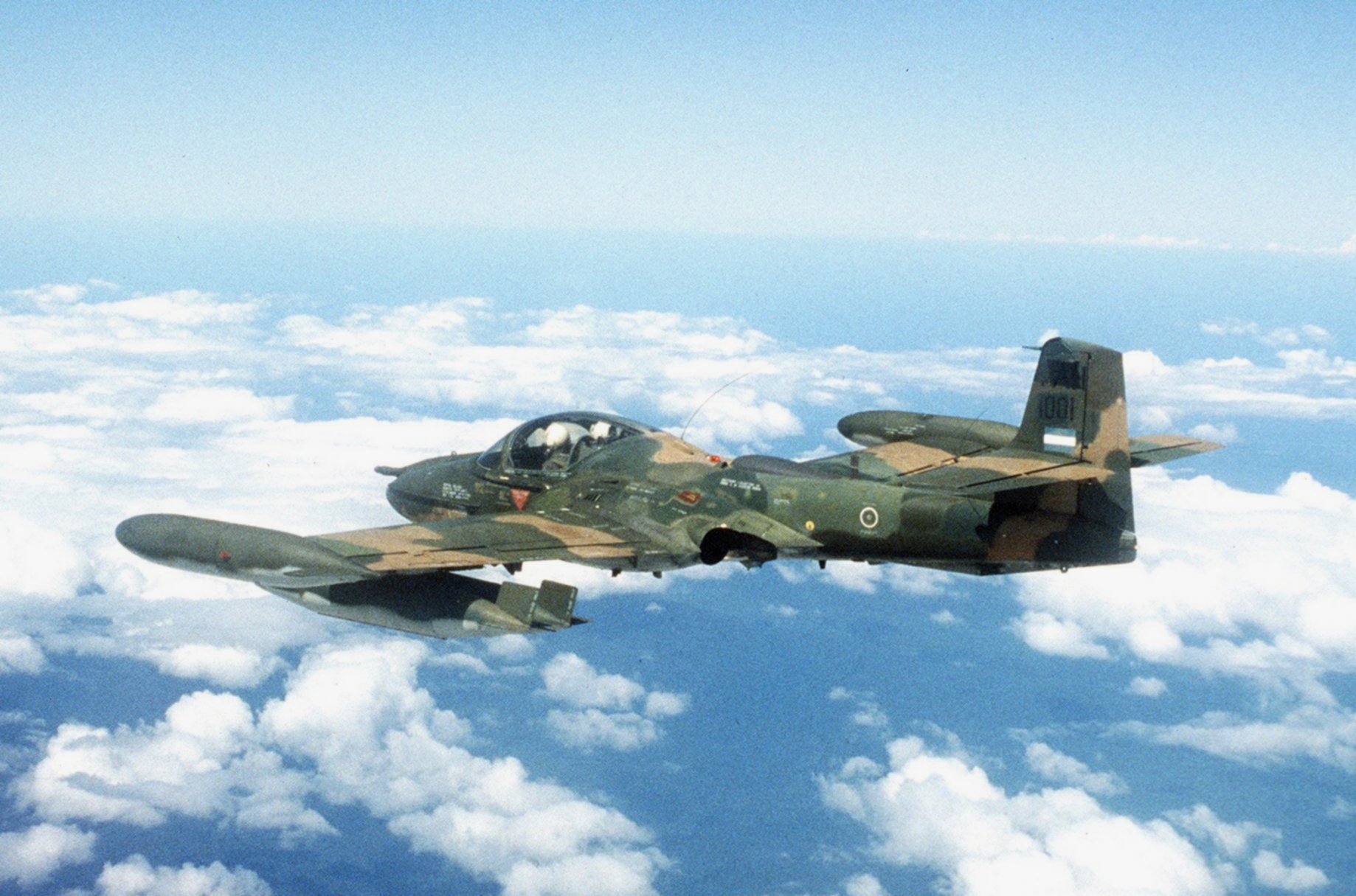
A Honduran Air Force A-37 Dragonfly aircraft during a combined U.S./Honduran training operation in 1983.

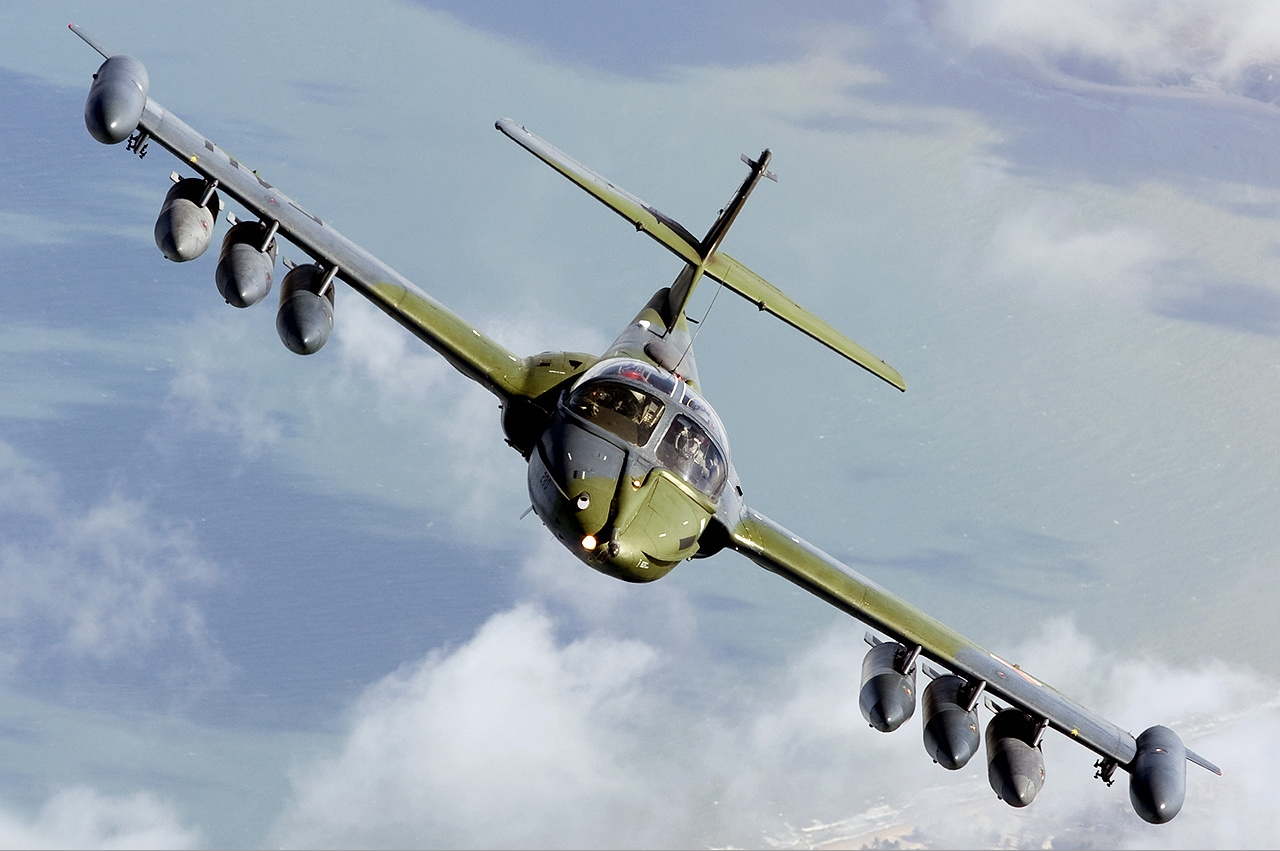
Uruguayan Air Force Cessna OA-37B Dragonfly

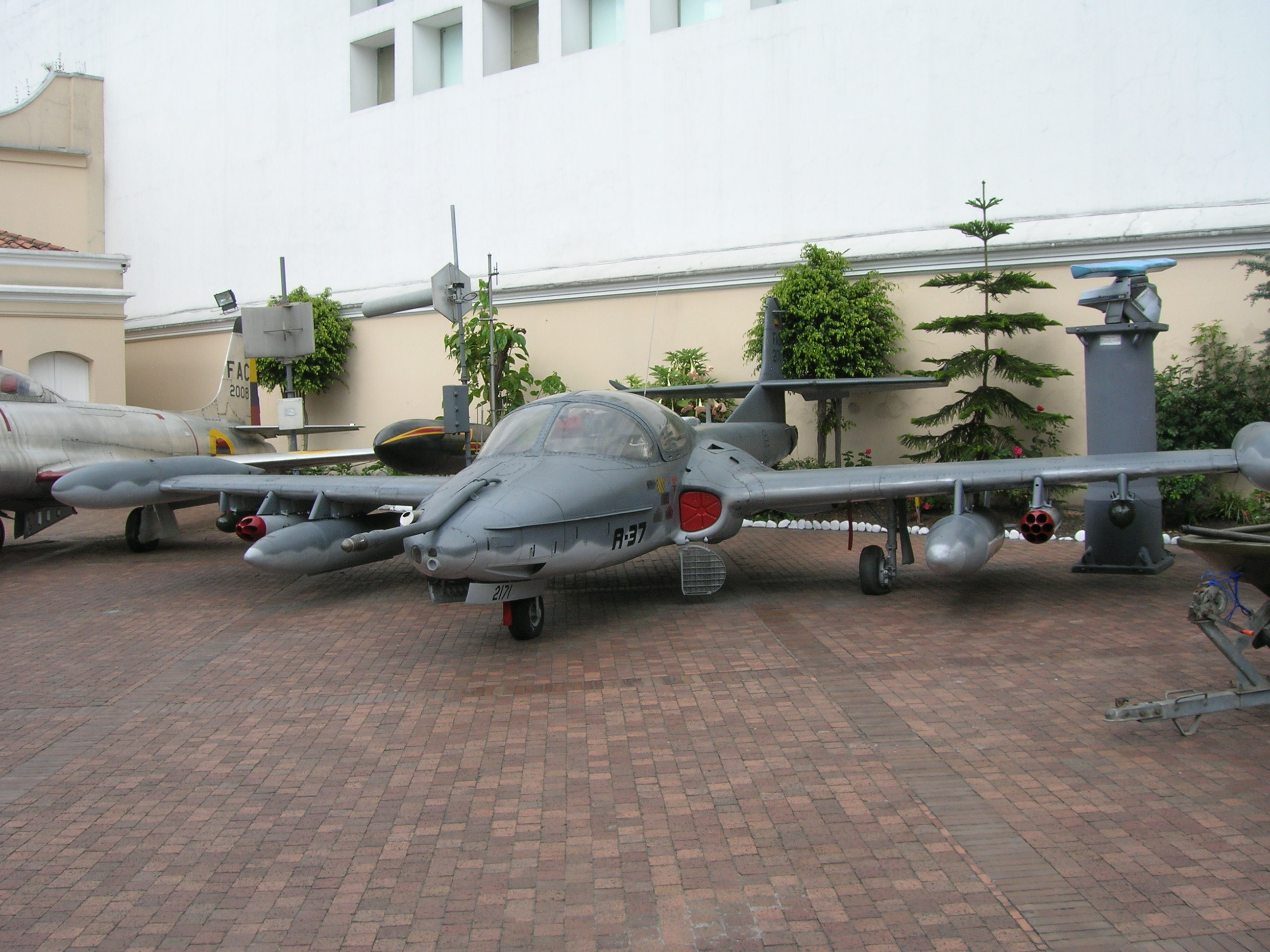
A-37 on display at the military Museum, Bogota

El Salvador

- Salvadoran Air Force - 13 in service as of December 2022.

Guatemala

- Guatemalan Air Force 3 remain in service as of December 2022.

Honduras

- Honduran Air Force 9 operational as of December 2022.

Peru

- Peruvian Air Force 20 operational as of December 2022. Peru has acquired 8 A-37Bs donated by South Korea in 2010.

=== Former ===
Chile

- Chilean Air Force received 44 aircraft – Retired by the end of 2009, the last two planes in flight were flown back to Santiago-El Bosque AFB on May 27, 2010.

Dominican Republic

- Dominican Air Force

Colombia

- Colombian Air Force received 16 aircraft, 14 of them were in service as of December 2022. They were modified to carry GBU-12 Paveway II LGBs. Despite the modernizations the aircraft were retired by the end of 2023. Replaced by the T-6C Texan II.

Ecuador

- Ecuadorian Air Force received 28 aircraft. Replaced by the Embraer EMB 314 Super Tucano.

South Korea

- South Korean Air Force – First introduced in October 1976, the A-37 was replaced by the T-50 Golden Eagle. It also served with the ROKAF Black Eagles aerobatic team, until retired after the Seoul Air Show in 2007.

Thailand

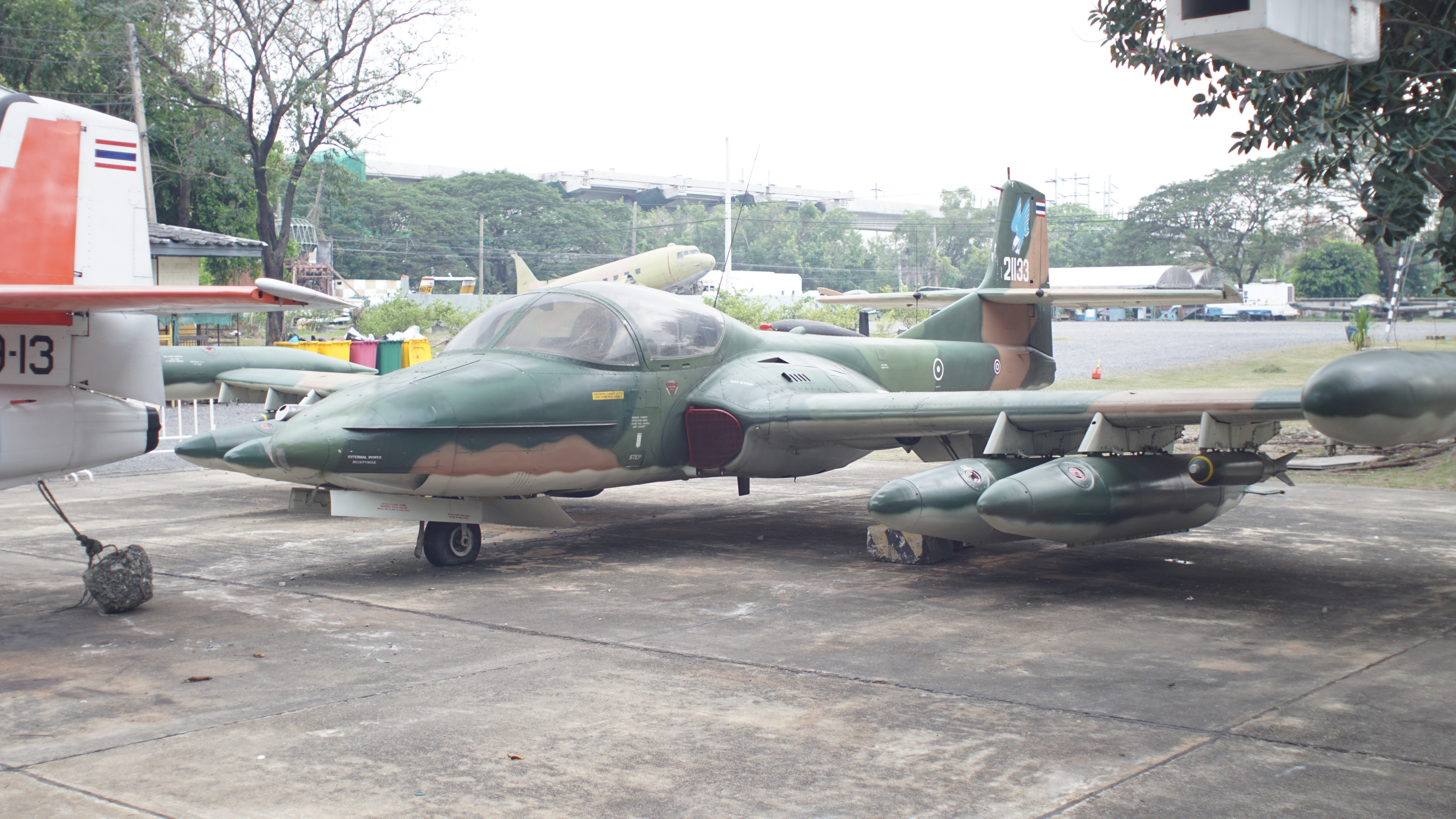
A-37B (21133) on display at the Royal Thai Air Force Museum

- Royal Thai Air Force - 16 received in the 1970s, with two more received in the 1980s.

United States

- United States Air Force. Retired from service in 1992.

see List of United States Air Force squadrons operating the A-37 Dragonfly
Uruguay

- Uruguayan Air Force retired in 2026

South Vietnam

- Republic of Vietnam Air Force - 254 received.

Vietnam

- Vietnam Air Force - 95 captured

== Aircraft on display ==
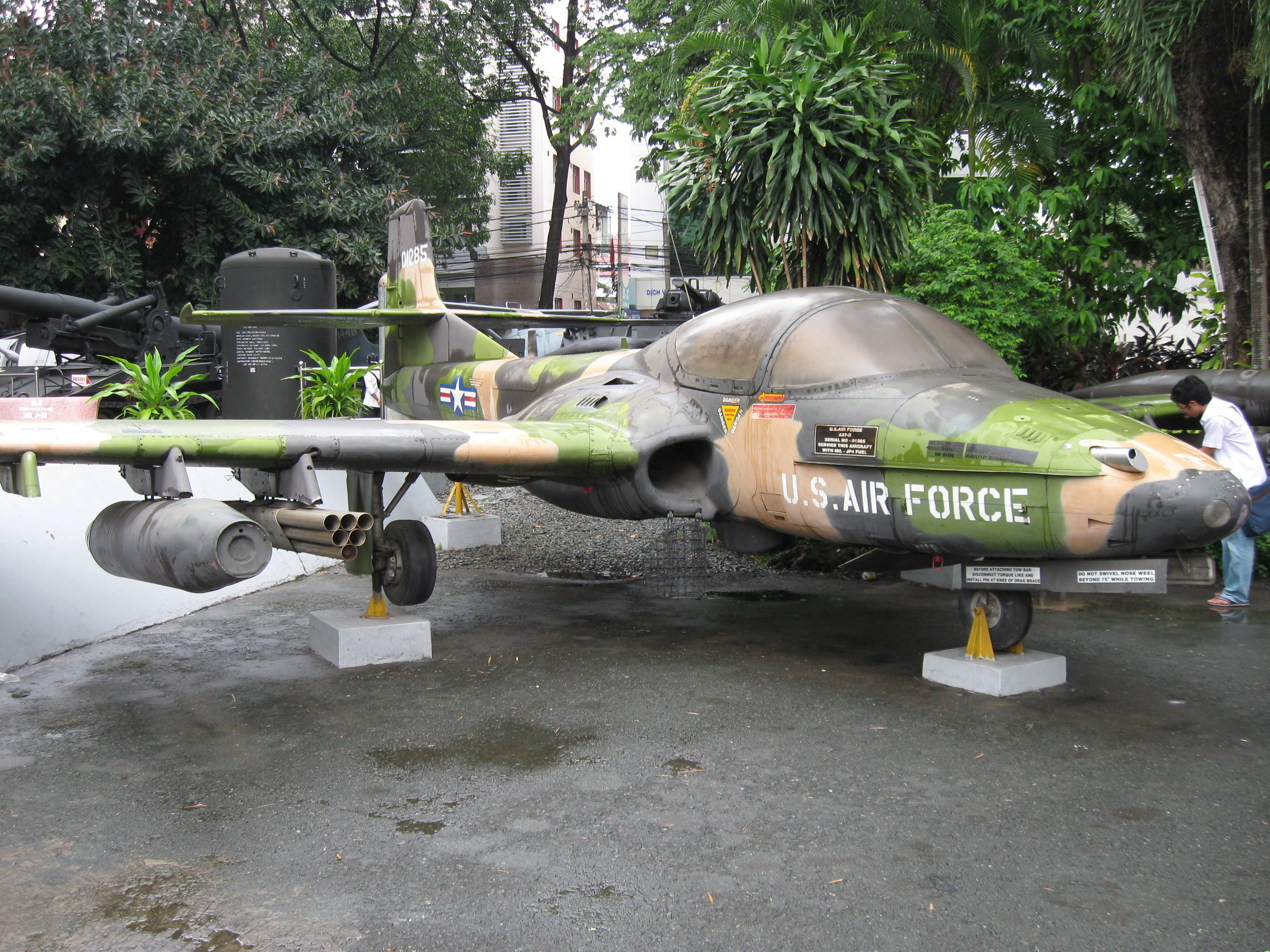
A-37, AF Ser. No. 70-1285, in Ho Chi Minh City at the War Remnants Museum; this is a former VNAF aircraft with spurious USAF markings reapplied

=== Australia ===
Airworthy

A-37B Dragonfly

- 68-10779 - Temora Aviation Museum, civil registered as VH-XVA. Ownership was transferred to the Royal Australian Air Force in July 2019 and it is operated by the Air Force Heritage Squadron (Temora Historic Flight).
- 68-10805 - Temora Aviation Museum, civil registered as VH-DLO.

=== Chile ===
Display

A-37B Dragonfly

- FACh 629 - Museo Nacional Aeronáutico y del Espacio in Santiago.

=== Colombia ===
Display

A-37B Dragonfly

- FAC-2171 (ex-USAF 71-0370) - Museo Militar Colombia in Bogotá, Colombia

=== New Zealand ===
Display

A-37B Dragonfly

- Classic Flyers Museum in Mount Maunganui; one of the two has been restored to flying condition

=== Poland ===
Display

A-37B Dragonfly

- Polish Aviation Museum in Kraków donated by Vietnam People's Air Force in 1978 with 2 F-5 (1 F-5A and 1 F-5E) for aeronautical re-engineering projects.

=== Thailand ===
Display

A-37B Dragonfly

- Royal Thai Air Force Museum in Don Mueang, Bangkok.
- 71-0825 - Takhli Royal Thai Air Force Base in Nakhon Sawan, mounted on pedestal at entrance. Former VNAF aircraft, captured during Fall of Saigon after pilot flew to seek refuge in Thailand.

=== United States ===
Display

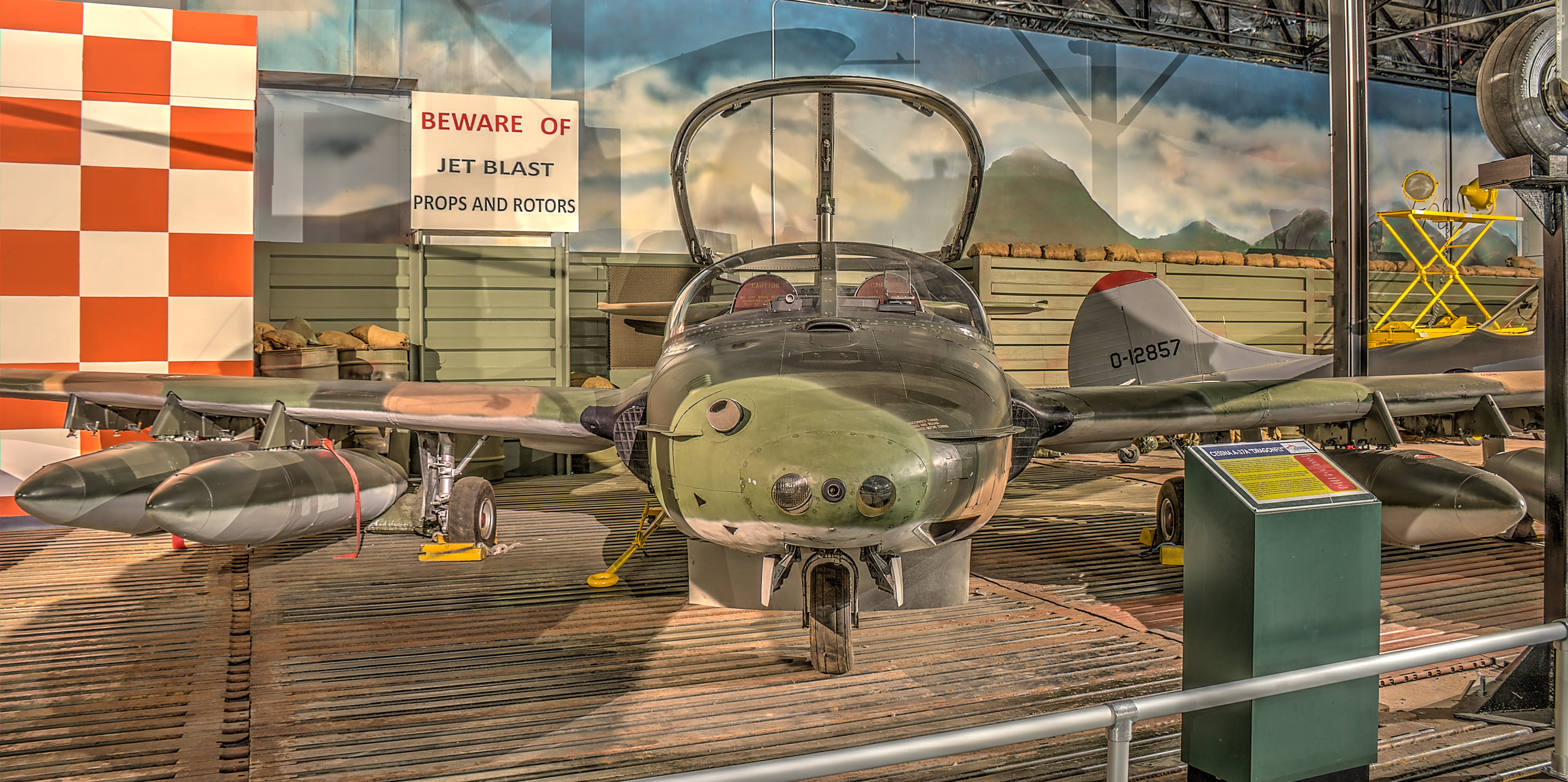
Cessna A-37A display at the Museum of Aviation

YA-37A Dragonfly

- 62-5951 - National Museum of the United States Air Force at Wright-Patterson Air Force Base in Dayton, Ohio. This aircraft, one of two YAT-37Ds, was retired to the museum in December 1964. In August 1966 it was recalled to active service for final testing of the A-37 design. The aircraft was retired to the museum for a second time in July 1970 as the YA-37A.

A-37A Dragonfly

- 67-14525 - Museum of Aviation, Robins AFB, Warner Robins, Georgia.

A-37B Dragonfly

- 67-14790 - Lackland Static Airplane Display at Lackland Air Force Base in San Antonio, Texas
- 69-6439 - Stonehenge Air Museum, Fortine, Montana.
- 71-0790 - March Field Air Museum, Riverside, California.

OA-37B Dragonfly

- 70-1293 - Memorial Air Park at Hurlburt Field in Florida.
- 73-1114 - Yolo Fliers Club at Watts-Woodland Airport.

NA-37B

- 73-1090 - Air Force Flight Test Museum at Edwards AFB.

=== Vietnam ===
Display

A-37B Dragonfly

- 67-14529 - Vietnam People's Air Force Museum, Hanoi
- 70-1285 - War Remnants Museum
- 70-3724 – Museum of Ho Chi Minh City

=== Uruguay ===
Display

A-37B Dragonfly

- 69-6429 - Colonel Jaime Meregalli Aeronautical Museum, Canelones.

== Specifications (A-37B Dragonfly) ==
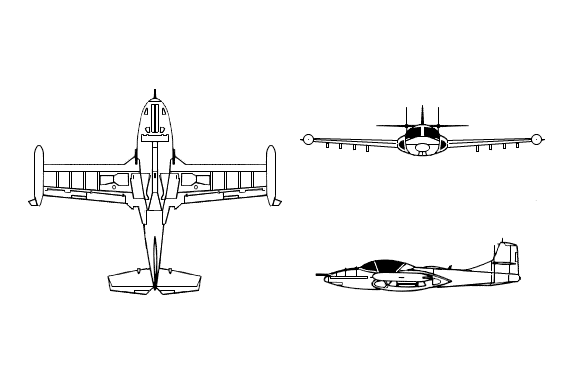
3-view line drawing of the Cessna A-37 Dragonfly

Data from Jane's Civil and Military Aircraft Upgrades

General characteristics

- Crew: 2
- Length: 28 ft 3 1/4 in (8.617 m)
- Wingspan: 35 ft 10 1/2 in (10.935 m) (over tip tanks)
- Height: 8 ft 10 1/2 in (2.705 m)
- Wing area: 183.9 sq ft (17.08 m^{2})
- Aspect ratio: 6.2:1
- Airfoil: NACA 2418 (modified) at root, NACA 2412 (modified) at tip
- Empty weight: 6,211 lb (2,817 kg)
- Max takeoff weight: 14,000 lb (6,350 kg)
- Fuel capacity: 507 US gal (422 imp gal; 1,920 L) usable internal fuel (including tip tanks)
- Powerplant: 2 × General Electric J85-GE-17A turbojet, 2,850 lbf (12.7 kN) thrust each

Performance

- Maximum speed: 507 mph (816 km/h, 441 kn)
- Cruise speed: 489 mph (787 km/h, 425 kn) (max. cruise)
- Stall speed: 113 mph (182 km/h, 98 kn) at maximum landing weight, wheels and flaps down
- Never exceed speed: 524 mph (843 km/h, 455 kn)
- Combat range: 460 mi (740 km, 400 nmi) (with maximum payload)
- Ferry range: 1,012 mi (1,629 km, 879 nmi) (with 4× 100 US gal (83 imp gal; 380 L) drop tanks
- Service ceiling: 41,765 ft (12,730 m)
- Rate of climb: 6,990 ft/min (35.5 m/s)

Armament

- Guns:
  - 1 × 7.62 mm (0.300 in) GAU-2B/A minigun in nose with 1500 rounds
  - Provision for SUU-11/A gun pods under wings
- Hardpoints: 8 with a capacity of inner four: 860 lb (390 kg), two intermediate: 600 lb (270 kg), two outer: 500 lb (230 kg)
- Rockets: LAU-3/A rocket pods
- Missiles: AIM-9 Sidewinder
- Bombs:
  - 250 lb (110 kg) Mark 81, 500 lb (230 kg) Mark 82 or 750 lb (340 kg) M117 bombs
  - BLU-32B or BLU-1C/B fire bombs
  - CBU-12, CBU-22 or CBU-24 cluster bombs
  - SUU-14 bomb dispenser

== See also ==
Related development

- Cessna T-37 Tweet

Aircraft of comparable role, configuration, and era

- BAC Strikemaster
- Saab 105
- Canadair CT-114 Tutor
