= National Command Chief of the Civil Air Patrol =

National Command Chief of Civil Air Patrol
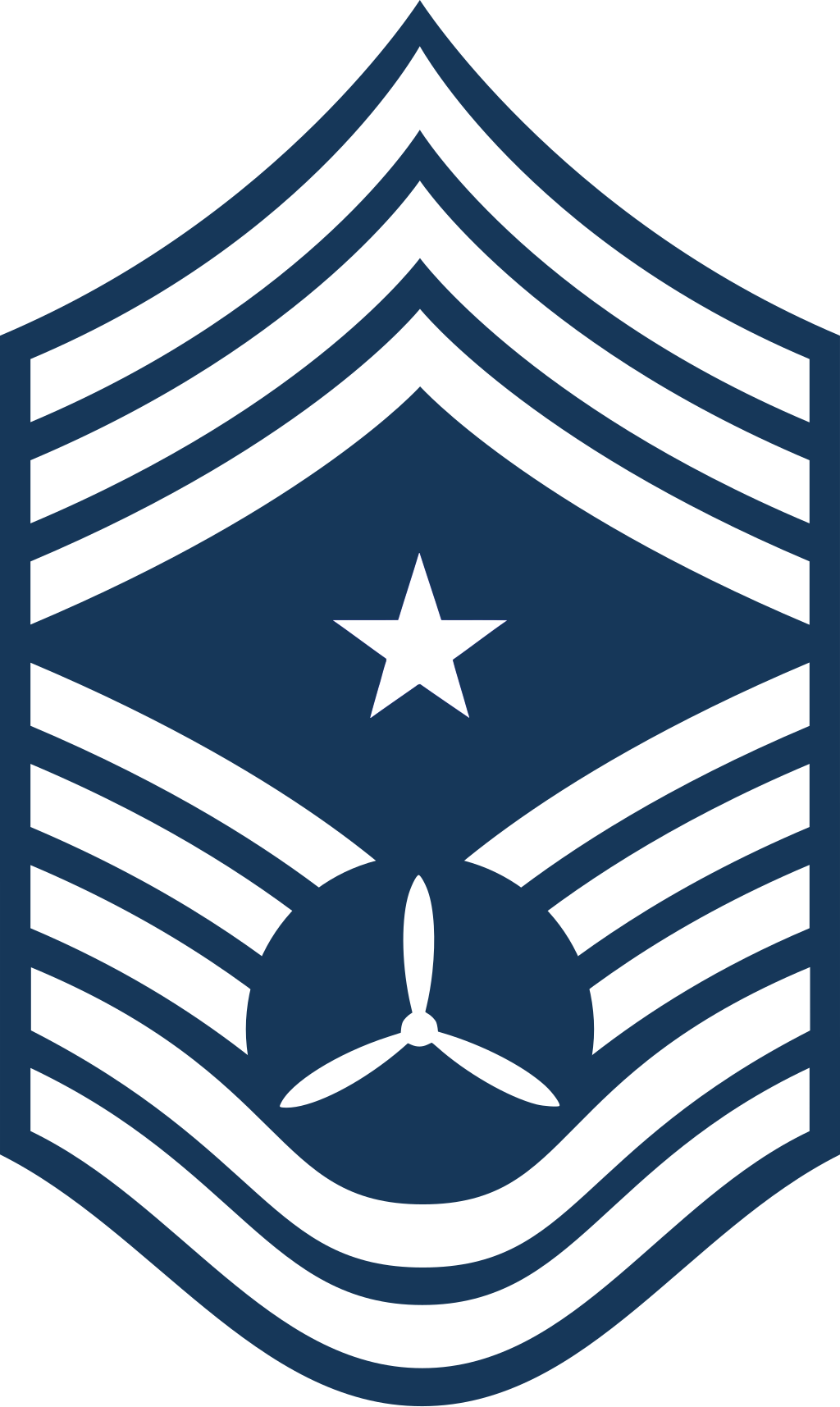

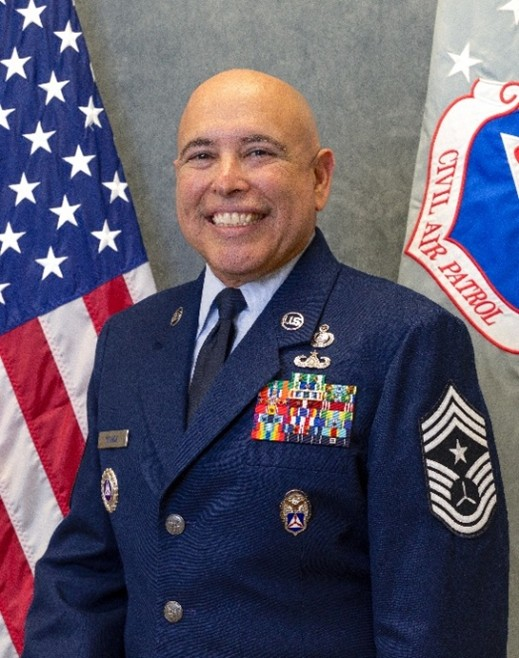
- Incumbent; Chief Master Sgt. Luis E. Negron since August 2025
- Type: Senior Enlisted Advisor
- Member of: CAP National Command Team
- Reports to: CAP National Commander / CEO
- Appointer: CAP National Commander / CEO
- First holder: Chief Master Sgt. Lou Walpus
- Website: https://www.gocivilairpatrol.com/about/governance/cap-commandteam

The Civil Air Patrol National Command Chief is the head of the Civil Air Patrol (CAP) non-commissioned officer corps, a member of the CAP national command team and an advisor to the CAP National Commander / CEO. The national command chief is also responsible for working with the US Air Force, especially the CAP-USAF commander.

The CAP Noncommissioned officer corps is made up of former NCOs of all branches of the US armed forces (Air Force, Army, Navy, Marine Corps, Coast Guard, Reserves or National Guard). These former military members can assume the same "grade" in the CAP that they had from E-4 to E-9. CAP NCOs serve in similar roles as they did in the military - training, technicians, superintendents, etc. As of June 2025 there were approximately 500 members of the CAP NCO corps. The current system of CAP NCOs was established in 1984 allowing former military to assume their previous rank or equivalent rank in the CAP. And in 2013, the CAP created the current insignia of the NCO corps.

During the tenure of CAP Chief Master Sgt. Todd H. Parsons, the Civil Air Patrol added a new insignia for the position of National Command Chief of the Civil Air Patrol. It is similar to the US Air Force Command Master Chief stripes, but with the USAF star replaced with the CAP Propeller. Unlike all the other senior CAP enlisted rank insignia, it does not contain the letters CAP in between the upper and lower chevrons, but has a single white star.

== List of Civil Air Patrol National Command Chiefs ==
No.	Portrait	Name	Term of office			
No.	Portrait	Name	Took office	Left office	Appointed By	Ref
1	--	Chief Master Sgt. Lou E. Walpus	2008	2014	Maj. Gen. Amy Courter	
2	--	Chief Master Sgt. Robert F. Eldridge	2014	2017	Maj. Gen. Joseph Vazquez	
3	--	Chief Master Sgt. Dennis H. Orcutt Jr.	August 2017	August 2018	Maj. Gen. Joseph Vazquez	
4		Chief Master Sgt. Robert Dandridge	August 2018	February 2022	Maj. Gen. Mark E. Smith	
5		Chief Master Sgt. Todd H. Parsons	February 2022	August 2025	Maj. Gen. Edward D. Phelka Maj. Gen. Regena M. Aye	
6		Chief Master Sgt. Luis E. Negron	August 2025	Present	Maj. Gen. Regena M. Aye	

== See also ==
- National Commander of the Civil Air Patrol
- Civil Air Patrol
- Chief Master Sergeant of the Air Force
