= Regena M. Aye =

Civil Air Patrol national commander

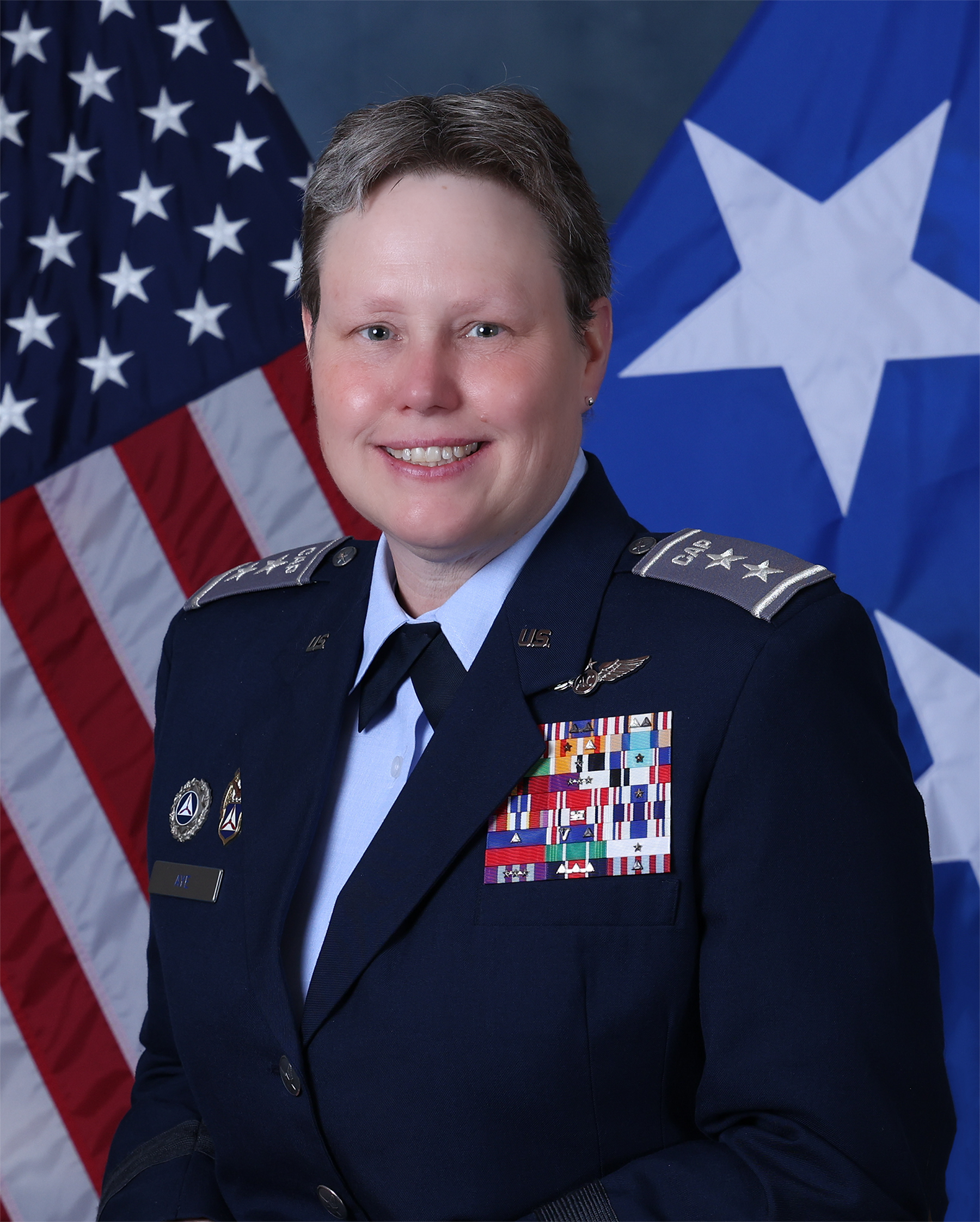
- Education: Baker University (B.A., EdD); Emporia State University (M.A.)
- Military career
- Allegiance: United States
- Branch: Civil Air Patrol
- Service years: 1989–present
- Rank: Major General
- Commands: National Commander, Civil Air Patrol; North Central Region; Kansas Wing; Emporia Composite Squadron
- Awards: Distinguished Service Medal (4); President's Call to Service Award; Exceptional Service Award; Torch Award (3); Meritorious Service Award

Regena M. Aye is a major general and the 26th National Commander of the Civil Air Patrol. Aye succeeded Maj. Gen. Edward D. Phelka as National Commander on August 17, 2024. She was previously the National Vice Commander and North Central Region Commander.

== Education ==
Aye earned a Bachelor of Arts in political science from Baker University, attending from 1990 to 1994. She later obtained a Master of Arts in history from Emporia State University, attending from 1996 to 1998. She returned to Baker University to pursue a Doctor of Education in educational leadership, earning the degree between 2008 and 2016.

== Civil Air Patrol ==
Aye began her CAP career in 1989 as a cadet and earned the Gen. Carl A. Spaatz Award in 1992, the highest achievement in the CAP Cadet Program.

After becoming a senior member, Aye served as Kansas Wing Commander from 2008 to 2012. In 2013, she was appointed North Central Region Vice Commander, serving until 2016, when she assumed the role of North Central Region Commander, a position she held until 2020. In 2021, she was named National Vice Commander under Maj. Gen. Edward D. Phelka, serving until 2024. While serving as National Vice Commander, she advised the National Commander as a member of the CAP Command Council and the CAP Senior Advisory Group (CSAG).

Following her service as vice commander, in April 2024, the Civil Air Patrol Board of Governors appointed Aye to a three-year term as National Commander and CEO, which commenced on August 17, 2024. As National Commander, she serves as the highest-ranking CAP officer, overseeing the organization's operations and advising the CAP Board of Governors, the organization's governing body.

=== Commands held ===
- CAP National Commander (August 17, 2024 – present)
- CAP National Vice Commander (August 2021 – August 2024)
- North Central Region Commander (May 2016 – May 2020)
- North Central Region Vice Commander (January 2013 – May 2016)
- Kansas Wing Commander (May 2008 – May 2012)

== Awards and decorations ==
Aye's awards and decorations include:

Senior Aircrew Badge
Air and Space Organizational Excellence Award	Civil Air Patrol Distinguished Service Medal Two bronze triangular clasps	Civil Air Patrol Exceptional Service Award One silver triangular clasp and one bronze triangular clasp
Civil Air Patrol Meritorious Service Award	Civil Air Patrol Commander's Commendation Award One bronze service star and one silver triangular clasp	Civil Air Patrol Achievement Award
Civil Air Patrol Unit Citation Award One silver triangular clasp	Gill Robb Wilson Award One silver service star	Paul E. Garber Award One bronze service star
Grover Loening Award	Civil Air Patrol Leadership Award Three silver service stars	Civil Air Patrol Membership Award
Brigadier General Charles E. "Chuck" Yeager Aerospace Education Achievement Award	General Carl A. Spaatz Award	Civil Air Patrol Command Service Ribbon Two gold service stars
Civil Air Patrol Crisis Service Ribbon	Civil Air Patrol Red Service Ribbon Twenty-five year longevity device	Civil Air Patrol Search "Find" Ribbon
Civil Air Patrol Air Search and Rescue Ribbon One silver triangular clasp	Civil Air Patrol Disaster Relief Ribbon One silver "V" device and one silver triangular clasp	Civil Air Patrol Community Service Ribbon
International Air Cadet Exchange Ribbon	National Cadet Color Guard Competition Ribbon	Cadet Advisory Council Ribbon One silver service star
Cadet Special Activities Ribbon Three silver service stars	Civil Air Patrol Encampment Ribbon Three silver triangular clasps	Civil Air Patrol Senior Recruiter Ribbon One silver triangular clasp

== See also ==
- National Commander of the Civil Air Patrol
