= Ranks of the Civil Air Patrol =

Ranking structure of the Civil Air Patrol

Members of Civil Air Patrol are assigned various ranks, the titles and insignia of which are based on those used by the United States Air Force. Each grade and insignia corresponds to an equivalent United States Air Force enlisted rank insignia and an equivalent officer rank insignia.

== Cadet grades ==
Cadet grades are awarded to cadets in the CAP. A cadet begins at cadet airman basic and must progress through all the enlisted grades before becoming a cadet officer. Each achievement requires the completion of several tasks.

=== Cadet airman basic ===
Cadet airman basic (C/AB) (C/E-1) is the beginner level grade of Civil Air Patrol (CAP) cadets and of all phases. This is the entry-level position for junior cadets joining the Cadet Program. During the time that this grade is held, most cadets undergo some form of squadron, group, and, occasionally, wing-level training in the basics of CAP and what it has to offer. The cadet will wear no insignia with this grade. The grade has no corresponding achievement award. All new cadets begin at cadet airman (C/Amn).

Cadet airmen basic are to be referred to as "Cadet" by other cadets and senior members.

=== Cadet airman ===

Cadet airman (C/Amn)(C/E-2) is a grade that indicates the completion of the first achievement of 16 in the Civil Air Patrol cadet program. The cadet airman insignia is based on the design of the airman insignia from the USAF with a CAP cadet shield superimposed over the center. Requirements to obtain this cadet grade include a 25-question test on the fundamentals of leadership and followership taken from chapter one of "Learn to Lead, Volume 1". completion of both the test and the optional 'interactive module' awards the cadet honor credit, allowing them to affix a silver star to the Achievement 1 ribbon. A drill performance test, and an attempt at a cadet physical fitness test (CPFT) are also required. Also included in promotion is attending at least one Moral Leadership (Character Development) session provided by the cadet's local squadron. Some local units also require review boards to ensure that a person meets all requirements for this, but many squadrons only require promotion boards for milestone achievements. Since 2015, cadets also must complete the new Wingman Program and quiz to obtain the grade of cadet airman.

The grade accompanies the General J. F. Curry Achievement.

Cadets who have earned the Curry Achievement are eligible to attend Basic Encampment (a week-long training activity for CAP cadets) and may also work towards their General Emergency Services (GES) rating.

Cadet airmen are to be referred to as "Airman" or "Cadet" by other cadets and senior members.

=== Cadet airman first class ===

Cadet airman 1st class (C/A1C) (C/E-3) is like cadet airman in many ways. Promotion to this grade indicates completion of the second of 16 achievements in the program. Some differences though are that at this level, cadets must pass an aerospace program along with a leadership, drill and an attempt at a physical fitness test. Cadets also must attend at least one Character Development session. Along with this, cadets sometimes begin serving as element leaders or begin working towards the experience of being flight sergeants while polishing their skills in learning how to be effective followers. The design is similar to that of a cadet airman with a second stripe.

The grade accompanies the General H. H. "Hap" Arnold Achievement.

Cadet airmen first class are to be referred to as "Airman" or "Cadet" by other cadets and senior members.

=== Cadet senior airman ===

Cadet senior airman (C/SrA) (C/E-4) is the third achievement in the Civil Air Patrol cadet program. It, like the requirements for cadet airman first class (C/A1C) includes a leadership, aerospace, and an attempt at a physical fitness test with many units requiring review boards to obtain this promotion. By this time, cadets have served at least 4 months in the program (usually more). Most cadets take longer than that to reach this point and usually have a couple of groups, wing, or other, higher-level activities and experience. Senior airmen are in essence NCOs in training. They may be asked to supervise subordinate cadets in the absence of a junior NCO. By this point, a senior airman is usually an element leader.

The grade accompanies the Mary Feik Achievement.

Cadet senior airmen are to be referred to as "Airman" or "Cadet" by other cadets and senior members.

=== Cadet staff sergeant ===

Cadet staff sergeant (C/SSgt) (C/E-5) is the first milestone achievement in the Civil Air Patrol cadet program. Formerly the Wright Brothers Achievement (which accompanied C/SrA prior to April 2003), it was made an award to mark the completion of the first phase of the CAP Cadet Program. The award requires passing a comprehensive, closed-book test on leadership covering the material learned over the first three achievements of the program. The cadet must also obtain a passing physical fitness test credential, valid for 6 months, and a comprehensive drill performance test, as well as a commitment of at least eight months of active membership in Civil Air Patrol. In addition, a promotion review board is required. He/she may also apply for a staff position at an encampment (provided that he or she has attended encampment before) or national activity. In addition cadet staff sergeants may also become flight sergeants and supervise flights anywhere from 8–20 cadets, although it is not uncommon to see a cadet staff sergeant still retain the position of element leader.

The grade accompanies the Wright Brothers Award, the first of the five Cadet Program Milestone Awards.

Cadet staff sergeants are to be referred to as "Sergeant" or "Cadet" by other cadets (depending on their rank) and senior members.

=== Cadet Technical Sergeant ===

The grade of Cadet Technical Sergeant (C/TSgt)(C/E-6) is the fifth achievement of the Civil Air Patrol cadet program. At this rank cadets are usually Flight Sergeants, but may also serve as element leaders instead. They can also apply to become staff at an encampment (Provided that he or she has attended encampment before) or a national activity.

The grade accompanies the Captain Eddie Rickenbacker Achievement.

Cadet Technical Sergeants are to be referred to as "Sergeant" or "Cadet" by other cadets (depending on their ranks) and Senior Members.

=== Cadet Master Sergeant ===

The grade of Cadet Master Sergeant (C/MSgt)(C/E-7) is the sixth achievement of the Civil Air Patrol cadet program. At this point a Cadet becomes a Senior NCO and may be given the billet of First Sergeant, at which time a diamond is placed on the grade insignia.

This rank was referred to as the "Charles A. Lindbergh achievement" prior to 2019, when a re-examination of Lindbergh revealed he didn't match with Civil Air Patrol's Core Values. It was then, and is now called Achievement 5. The name is reserved for future aerospace pioneers. This achievement is also considered a "Senior NCO" or shortly, "S-NCO".

Cadet Master Sergeants are to be referred to as "Sergeant" or "Cadet" by other cadets and Senior Members.

=== Cadet Senior Master Sergeant ===

The grade of Cadet Senior Master Sergeant (C/SMSgt) (C/E-8) is the seventh achievement of the Civil Air Patrol cadet program. At this rank a cadet may serve as a first sergeant. However, it is not uncommon for a senior master sergeant to be a flight sergeant. Rarely, but in the event that there is a shortage of commissioned officers a Senior NCO may act as a Flight Commander, commanding a group of cadets numbering usually from 8-20.

The grade accompanies the General Jimmy Doolittle Achievement.

Cadet Senior Master Sergeants are to be referred to as "Sergeant" or "Cadet" by other cadets and Senior Members.

=== Cadet Chief Master Sergeant ===

The grade of Cadet Chief Master Sergeant (C/CMSgt) (C/E-9) is the eighth achievement of the Civil Air Patrol cadet program. There are two achievements with this rank. At this rank a Chief usually serves as a Squadron First Sergeant. However, a Chief may also be a Flight Sergeant. Lastly, like a Senior Master Sergeant, a Chief may serve as a Flight Commander if there is a shortage in officers.

The grade accompanies the Dr. Robert H. Goddard Achievement.

In order for a cadet to earn this grade, the cadet must pass the Leadership Achievement 7 test, and the only aerospace education test that the cadet has not yet passed. The cadet must also take and pass their Cadet Physical Fitness Test (CPFT), attend at least one Character Development session in their squadron since their last promotion, have actively participated, and finally, the cadet must have spent at least 56 days as a Cadet Senior Master Sergeant. On the cadet's ribbon they are eligible for two silver stars. One for successfully completing honor credit, and the other for earning the "Model Rocketry" badge. The badge is worn on the Air-Force style "Blues" uniform.

In addition, the grade of cadet chief master sergeant is held for another 56 days after the cadet has earned the Goddard Achievement. Upon completing a physical fitness test, a 300-500 word essay and a speech given to the squadron (and after the extra 56-day term), the cadet can earn the Neil Armstrong Achievement, which is the final achievement a cadet is able to receive before promoting on to the officer ranks.

Cadet Chief Master Sergeants are to be referred to as "Chief" or "Cadet" by other cadets and Senior Members.

=== Cadet First Sergeant ===
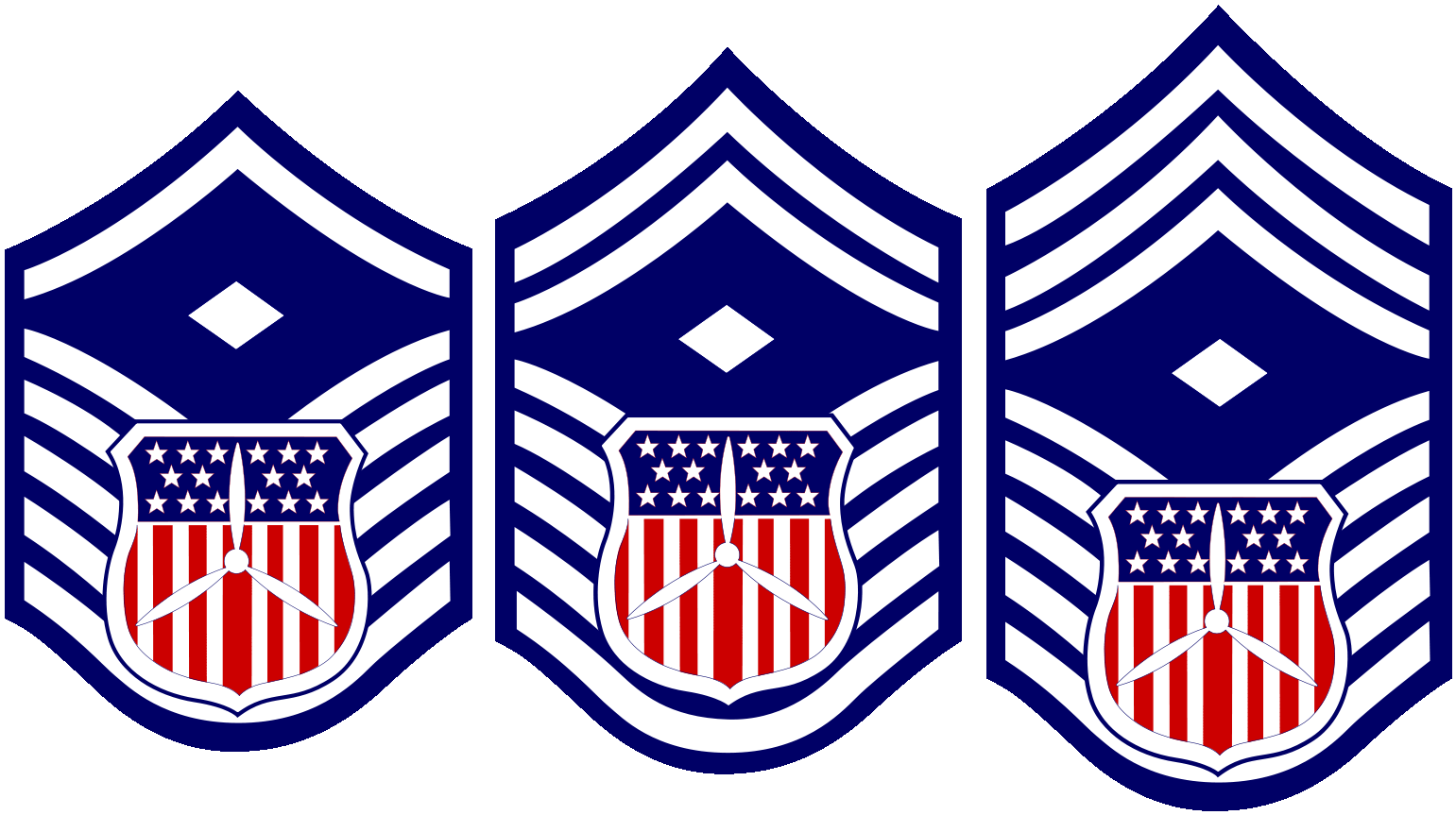

Cadet First Sergeant (C/1st Sgt) (C/CCF) is a position conferred to a cadet senior non-commissioned officer (S-NCO) in a unit. Rather than being a grade which any cadet may attain, this is a position granted to the cadet who will be acting in the leadership role over other cadets, and as such, there will be only one first sergeant at any given time. however, exceptions can be made to this for encampments, which may require multiple squadrons. Cadets achieving the grade of cadet second lieutenant may no longer hold the position of first sergeant, and it will be awarded to another senior cadet NCO (S-NCO). The term "First Sergeant" is not a rank or grade; rather it is a term of reference.

The roles of the cadet first sergeant are to relay information to Flight Sergeants and other NCOs or Airmen from the executive staff, be the eyes and ears of the cadet commander, be the voice of the cadets to the commander, and to be a mentor and example for all S-NCOs, NCOs and Airmen in the squadron. This position can lead in PT as well as being a supervisor and teacher to the Flight Sergeants on the drill pad. A first sergeant has no rank authority over flight commanders (since the Flight Commander position is an Officer billet, even when filled by another cadet NCO or S-NCO). A first sergeant is placed above or in-between flight commanders in the Chain of command, because they report to the cadet commander (as the Squadron's most Senior Enlisted cadet), but this does not give them authority over flight commanders. The first sergeant position is in the direct chain of command, and is there to make the chain of command work by relaying information from the enlisted grade cadets to the Cadet Commander. The reason the first sergeant position is not in the direct chain of command is because it does need to be positioned above flight staff to work. First sergeants do not have the authority to give Flight Commanders orders. Typically, Flight Commanders work directly with the Cadet Commander as a part of the squadron's executive staff and receive their orders from that authority. The Flight Sergeants report to only the Flight Commander. The First Sergeant does not usually receive reports from any enlisted cadets. However, there may be exceptions to this throughout squadrons.

The insignia for this position will be similar to the equivalent rank, but with a small diamond placed in the center of the chevron to convey their role as both an S-NCO (C/MSgt, C/SMSgt, or C/CMSgt). As shown by CAPR 60-1 on Table 4.1, Junior NCOs cannot be assigned to this position. Cadets serving in this position should always be addressed as first sergeant by other cadets, and can be called "First Sergeant", "Sergeant" ("Chief" when applicable) or simply "Cadet" by Senior Members.

=== Cadet Second Lieutenant ===

The grade of Cadet Second Lieutenant (C/2d Lt) (C/O-1) is the first cadet officer grade of the Civil Air Patrol cadet program, and second milestone award (after Cadet Staff Sergeant). There are two achievements with this rank. In order to achieve the award, cadets must pass two comprehensive, 60-minute tests with 50 questions each. One covers previously studied leadership modules, while the other covers the content of seven aerospace modules. Cadets must also pass a Cadet Physical Fitness Test (CPFT), have spent at least 112 days in the past grade, 56 for Goddard and 56 for Armstrong, and participated in Moral Leadership at least once since the cadet's last promotion, as well as having been a recorder and discussion leader at some point since completing the first phase of the Cadet Program. In addition, the cadet must attend and graduate an encampment.

At this rank a second lieutenant usually serves as a Flight Commander. They may also have to receive some leadership training and may also serve as the Cadet Commander of a squadron if there are no cadet officers of a higher rank in the squadron. However, contrary to the active duty military, all commissioned officers have risen through all the enlisted ranks.

A silver star worn on the accompanying ribbon denotes successful completion of Cadet Officer School.

The grade accompanies the Billy Mitchell Award. As well, if the cadet later enlists in the United States Air Force with this grade or higher, he or she enters with a Department of Defense pay grade of E-3. If the Cadet Enlists to any other branch, excluding the United States Marine Corps, they will still receive an E-3 pay grade.

Upon completing this award, cadets are eligible for direct promotion to second lieutenant after completion of Level 2, part one of Senior Member training, upon turning 21.

Cadet Second Lieutenants are to be referred to as "Lieutenant", "Sir/ Ma'am", or "Cadet" by other cadets and "Cadet" or "Lieutenant" by Senior Members.

=== Cadet First Lieutenant ===

The grade of Cadet First Lieutenant (C/1st Lt)(C/O-2) is the second cadet officer grade of the Civil Air Patrol cadet program. There are two achievements with this rank. The grade has no corresponding ribbon. A Cadet First Lieutenant usually commands a large flight of about 15–20 cadets. At this grade they may also become a cadet executive officer. They may also serve as an aerospace education or emergency services officer.

Cadet First Lieutenants are to be referred to as "Lieutenant", "Sir/ Ma'am", or "Cadet" by other cadets and "Cadet" or "Lieutenant" by Senior Members.

=== Cadet Captain ===

The grade of Cadet Captain (C/Capt)(C/O-3) is the third cadet officer grade of the Civil Air Patrol cadet program, and also the third milestone of five in the cadet program. There are three achievements with this rank. In order to achieve the award, cadets must pass the comprehensive and timed leadership test, as well as passing a Cadet Physical Fitness Test (CPFT), have written three Staff Duty Analyses, spent at least four months in the past grade and participated in Moral Leadership at least once since the cadet's last promotion.

The grade accompanies the Amelia Earhart Award. Award of the Earhart Award (and corresponding promotion to cadet captain) makes the cadet eligible for Civil Air Patrol's International Air Cadet Exchange. In addition cadet captains may begin to serve as Deputy Commander or even cadet commanders. At encampments or special activities a cadet captain may command a squadron and have as many as three Flights or 56 Cadets, 3 Flight Sergeants and a First Sergeant under him/her.

Upon completing this award, cadets are eligible for direct promotion to First Lieutenant as a Senior Member after completion of Level 2, Part one of Senior Member training, upon turning 21.

Cadet Captains are to be referred to as "Captain", "Sir/ Ma'am", or "Cadet" by other cadets and "Cadet" or "Captain" by Senior Members. Cadets who are promoted to C/Capt are also eligible for the International Air Cadet Exchange (IACE), at the age of 17.

=== Cadet Major ===
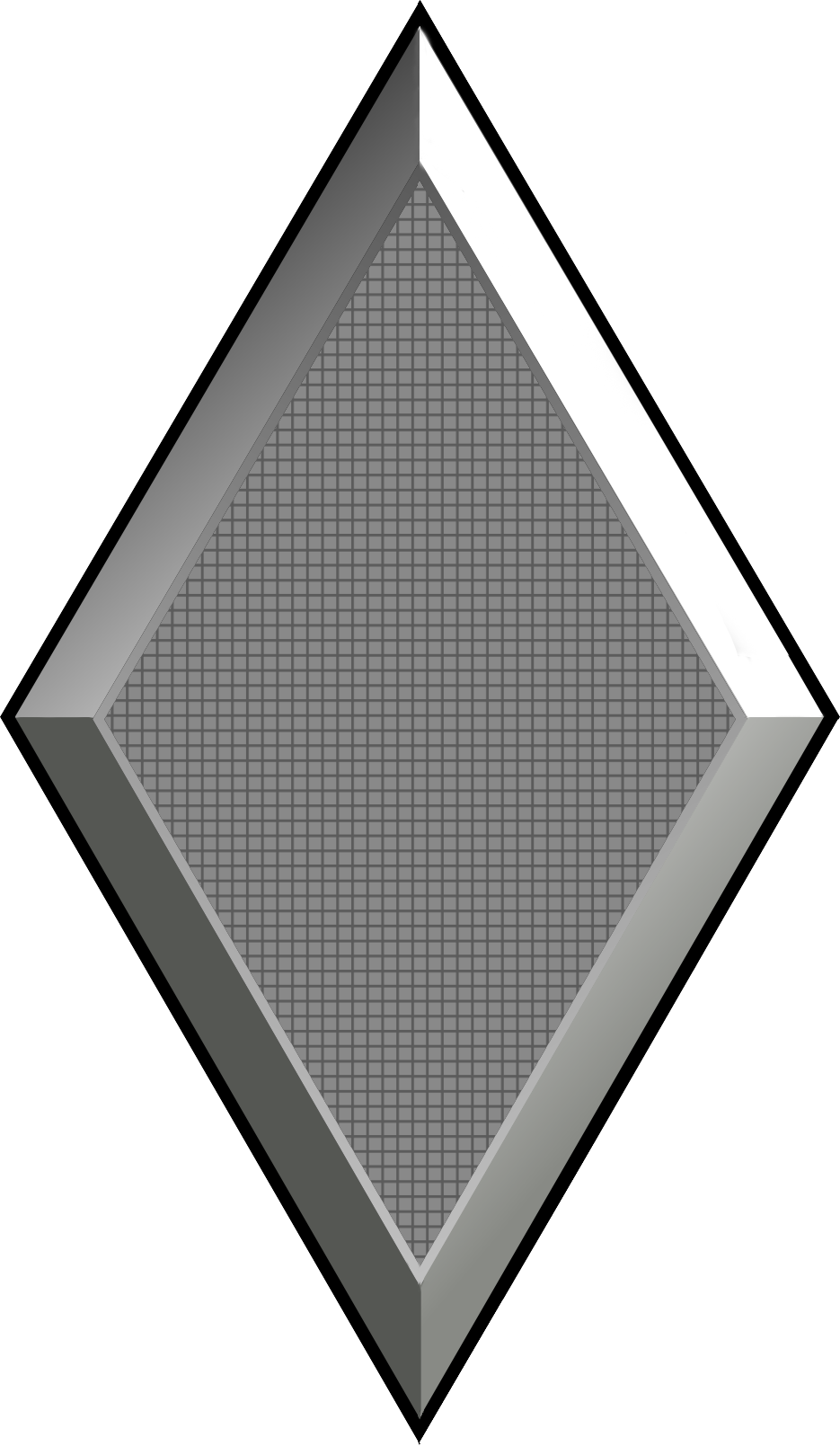

The grade of Cadet Major (C/Maj) (C/O-4) is the fourth cadet officer grade of the Civil Air Patrol cadet program. The grade has no corresponding ribbon. There are three achievements with this rank. At encampment or wing level a Cadet Major may serve as an Executive officer or Deputy Commander. They may also serve as a Cadet Commander at a squadron level. Also it is not uncommon for Cadet Majors and above to serve as training officers.

Cadet Majors are to be referred to as "Major", "Sir/ Ma'am", or "Cadet" by other cadets and "Cadet" or "Major" by Senior Members.

=== Cadet Lieutenant Colonel ===
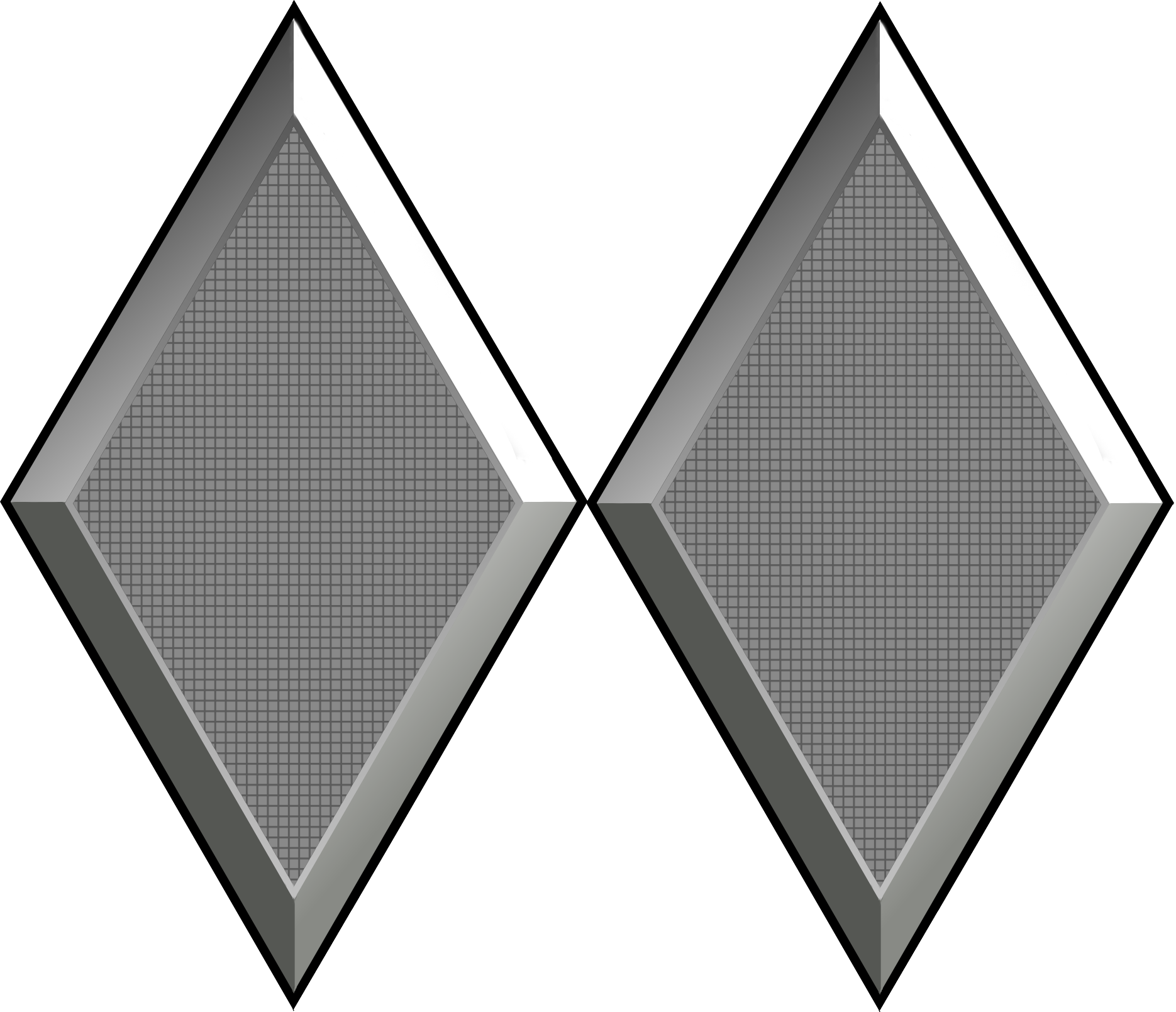

The grade of Cadet Lieutenant Colonel (C/Lt Col)(C/O-5) is a cadet officer grade that a cadet of the Civil Air Patrol may attain. It is the fourth milestone of five in the Cadet Program. Prior to 1996 this level of achievement was simply referred to as "Phase IV Completion".

The grade accompanies the General Ira C. Eaker Award.

In order for a cadet to earn this award, the cadet must have written an essay and give a speech, as well as take the PT test. They must have also attended a Leadership Academy such as RCLS (Regional Cadet Leadership School) or COS (Cadet Officer School). Alternatively, they may request that the Civil Air Patrol Cadet Programs consider a leadership program not listed above potential credit.

Cadet Lieutenant Colonels are to be referred to as "Colonel", "Sir/ Ma'am", or "Cadet" by other cadets and "Cadet" or "Colonel" by Senior Members.

=== Cadet Colonel ===
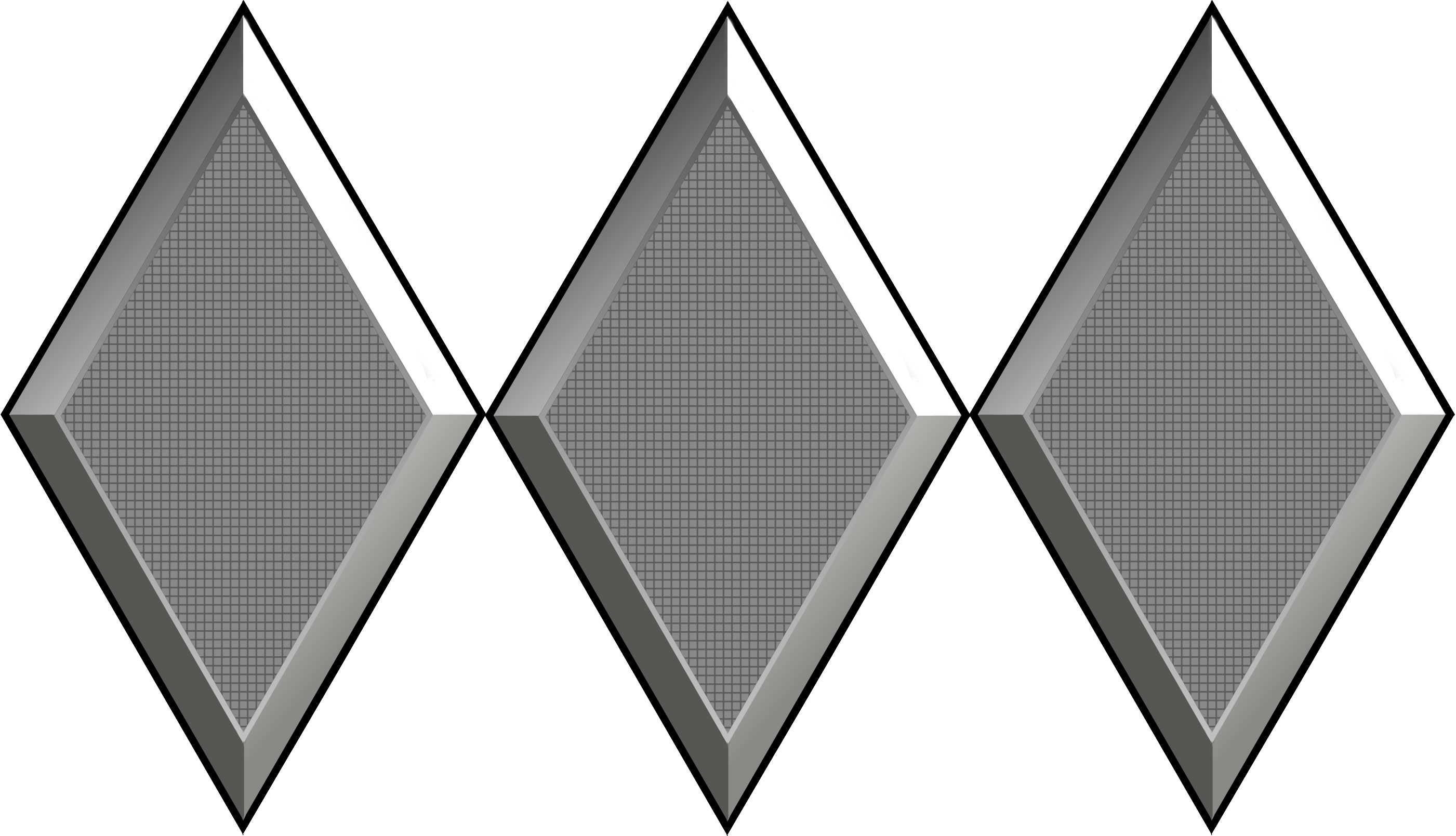

The grade of Cadet Colonel (C/Col) (C/O-6) is the highest grade, and final milestone that a cadet of the Civil Air Patrol may attain. The General Carl A. Spaatz Award. that garners the rank of C/Col is Civil Air Patrol's highest cadet award and honor and is achieved by less than 0.1% of all cadets nationwide. As of October 2024, only 2555 members have achieved the award since 1941. To attain the rank of Cadet Colonel, cadets must devote an average of 5 years of service, complete 19 successive rank examinations, pass four promotion boards, a timed 60-question comprehensive exam on leadership theory and CAP regulations (on 1,123 pages of text), a timed, 60-question comprehensive aerospace exam (on 482 pages of text), pass a timed essay on a question of perennial moral debate where they must argue for/against an issue on moral grounds/making appeals to reason, and pass the United States Air Force Academy Candidate Fitness Assessment. Upon completion of the Cadet Program achievements (Eaker Award, formerly known as "Phase IV Completion"), the cadet may request this examination. Only three attempts are authorized. If reached, this is considered to be the pinnacle of a cadet's career. Only 0.5% of cadets become Spaatz cadets.

Upon completing this award, cadets are eligible for direct promotion to captain as a senior member after completion of Level 2, part one of senior member training, upon turning 21. (Note: A list of Spaatz Award recipients may be found at the Spaatz Association's website.)

Cadet Colonels are called "Colonel", "Sir/ Ma'am", or "Cadet" by other cadets and may be called "Cadet" or "Colonel" by Senior Members.

== Senior Member Grades ==
Uniformed services pay grade	Special grade	O-10	O-9	O-8	O-7	O-6	O-5	O-4	O-3	O-2	O-1
Civil Air Patrol
Civil Air Patrol				Major general	Brigadier general	Colonel	Lieutenant colonel	Major	Captain	First lieutenant	Second lieutenant	Senior flight officer	Technical flight officer	Flight officer
NATO code	OF-10	OF-9	OF-8	OF-7	OF-6	OF-5	OF-4	OF-3	OF-2	OF-1

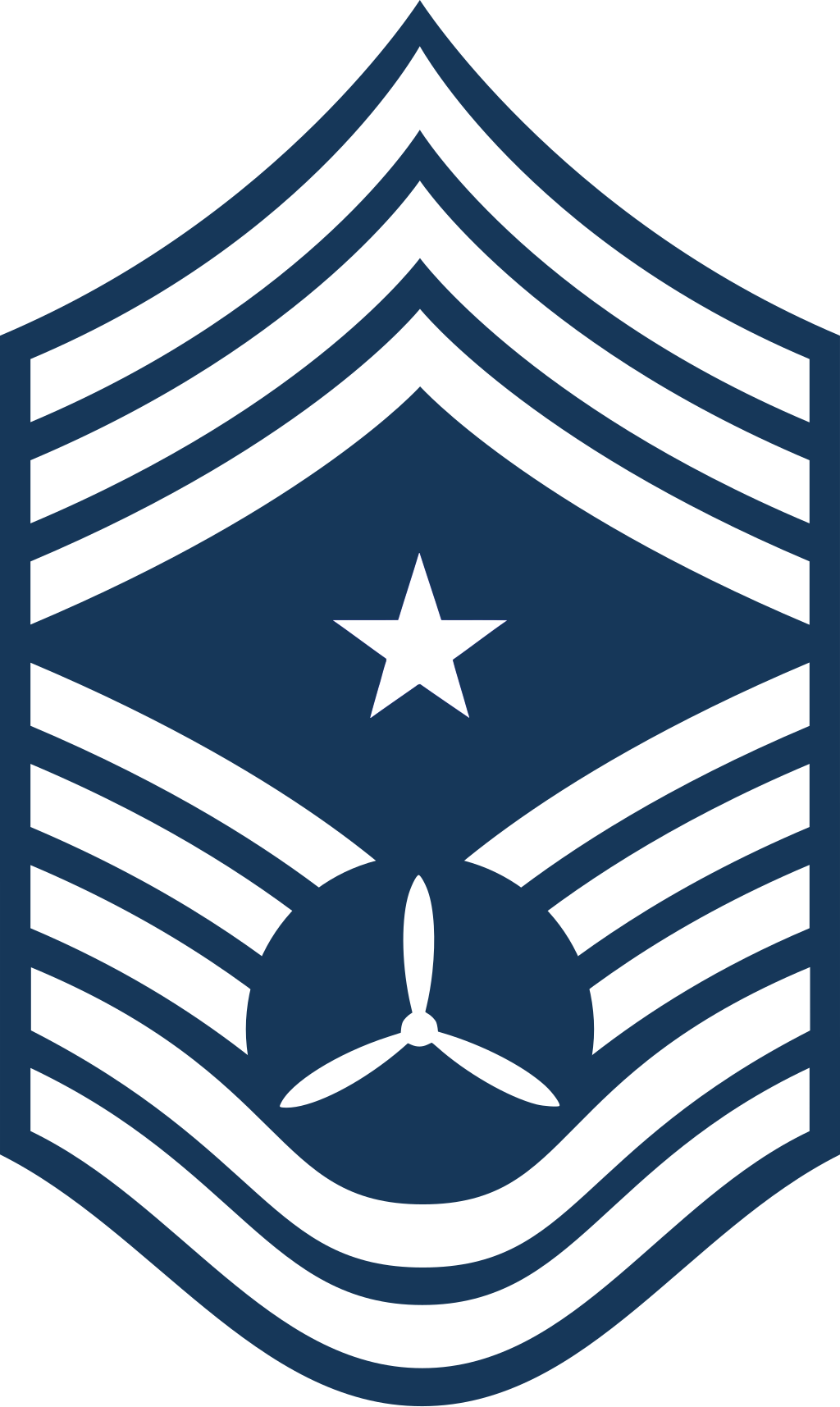
Uniformed services pay grade	Special	E-9	E-8	E-7	E-6	E-5	E-4	E-3	E-2	E-1
Civil Air Patrol
Civil Air Patrol	National Command Chief of the Civil Air Patrol	Chief master sergeant	Senior master sergeant	Master sergeant	Technical sergeant	Staff sergeant
NATO code	OR-9		OR-8	OR-7	OR-6	OR-5	OR-4	OR-3	OR-2	OR-1

Senior members are the adult volunteers in Civil Air Patrol. Initially, after joining, senior members will not hold rank. They are referred to as "senior member" until they have been awarded their initial rank, after completion of Level 2, part one of senior training. Promotion through the ranks is based upon completion of Education & Training (ET) program levels, including progression along a Specialty Track and service requirements. CAP Specialty Tracks are similar to the Air Force Specialty Code, and include such vocations as Historian, Cadet Programs, and many more.

Senior members are persons who join CAP after their 18th birthday, or cadets after their 21st birthday. Upon their 18th birthday, cadets may choose to remain as cadets or become senior members. Senior members under the age of 21 hold the ranks of flight officers, after completion of Level 2, part one of senior member training. A flight officer is roughly the equivalent of a second lieutenant, a technical flight officer is the rough equivalent of a first lieutenant, and a senior flight officer is the rough equivalent of a captain. Upon turning 21, flight officers are automatically promoted to the appropriate rank after completion of Part one, Level 2. Current or former military personnel that hold officer grades can be promoted to the equivalent CAP officer grade up to lieutenant colonel (example a major general can only promote to CAP Lt Col) after completion of part one, Level 2. All promotions are based on completion of ET program levels until lieutenant colonel. The CAP grades of colonel, brigadier general, and major general are reserved for wing and region commanders, National Vice Commander, and National Commander respectively. Since promotion from lieutenant to lieutenant colonel are based upon achievement, squadron commanders may be in charge of subordinate personnel who outrank them.

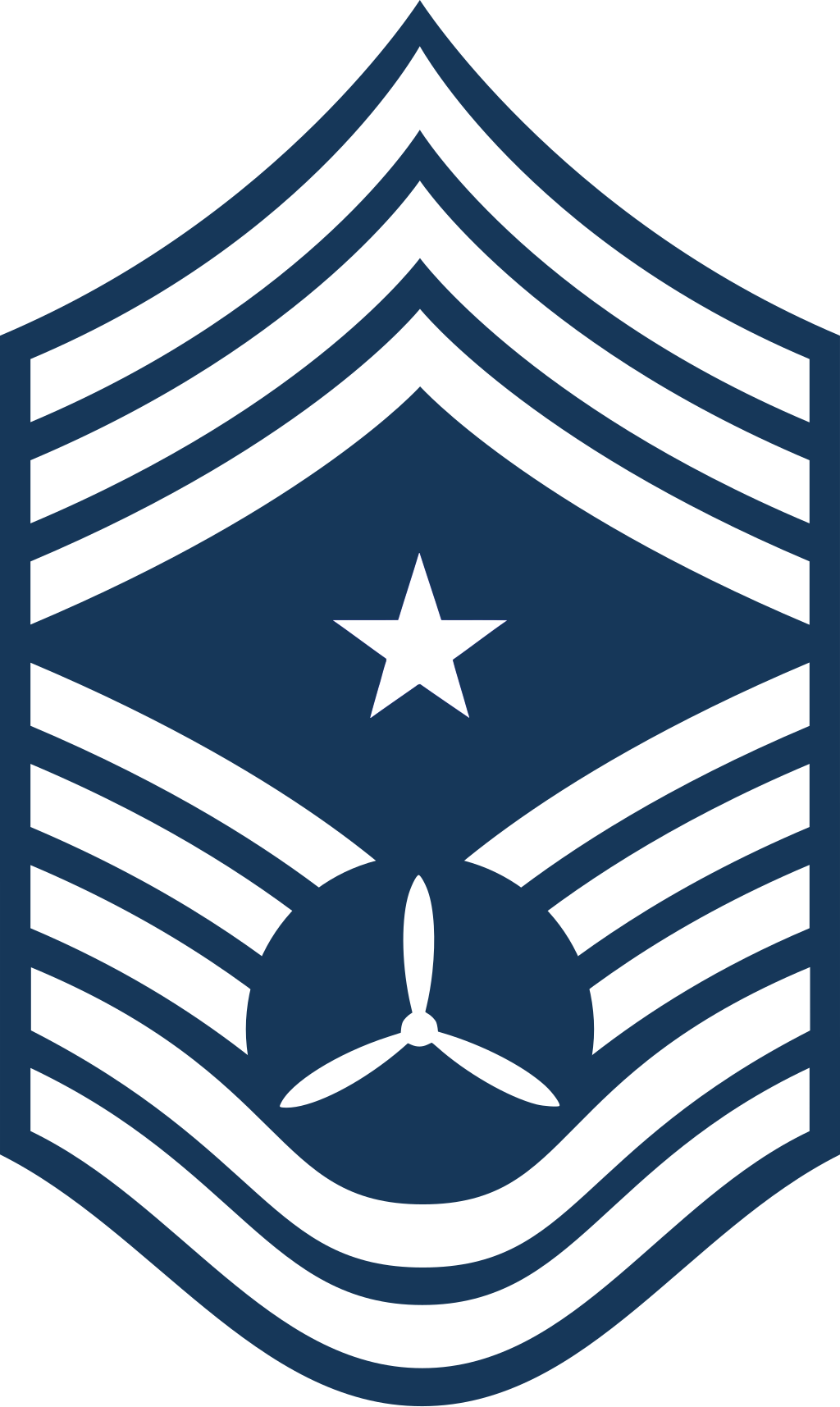
National Command Chief of the CAP Insignia

Only current or former military enlisted personnel may choose to retain their grade as senior members, with CAP grades E-5 through E-9 available, after completion of Part one, Level 2. A military enlisted member with the grade of E-4 can join the CAP as a non-commissioned officer with the CAP grade of staff sergeant. Senior members coming from a strictly civilian background have to come in through the officer grades. The NCO corps structure mirrors the Air Force NCO force structure with an established process to promote and develop NCOs.

During the tenure of CAP Chief Master Sgt. Todd H. Parsons, the Civil Air Patrol added a new insignia for the position of National Command Chief of the Civil Air Patrol. It is similar to the US Air Force Command Master Chief stripes, but with the USAF star replaced with the CAP Propeller. Unlike all the other senior CAP enlisted rank insignia, it does not contain the letters CAP in between the upper and lower chevrons, but has a single white star.

== See also ==
- Awards and decorations of the Civil Air Patrol
- National Cadet Special Activities
- Ranks of the Junior Reserve Officers' Training Corps
- Ranks of the cadet forces of the United Kingdom
- Cadets Canada Elemental Ranks
- New Zealand Cadet Forces ranks
- Australian Defence Force Cadets ranks
