= Charles L. Carr Jr. =

Charles L. Carr
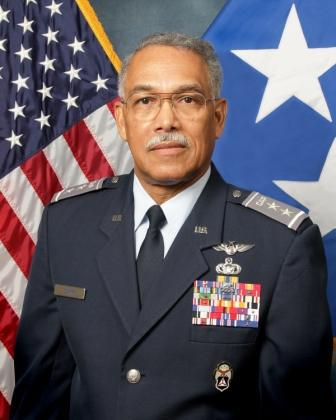
- Born: Columbus, Ohio
- Military career
- Allegiance: United States
- Branch: Civil Air Patrol; United States Air Force
- Service years: 1989—Present
- Rank: Major General, CAP
- Nickname: "Chuck"
- Commands: National Commander; National Vice Commander; Great Lakes Region Commander
- Awards: Air Force Commendation Medal; Distinguished Service Medal; Exceptional Service Award; Meritorious Service Award

Charles L. "Chuck" Carr, CAP, is a two-star major general and the former 22nd National Commander of the Civil Air Patrol. He succeeded Maj Gen Amy Courter on August 17, 2011. On August 15, 2014, Maj Gen Carr relinquished command to Maj Gen Joseph Vazquez. He was previously the National Vice Commander and Great Lakes Region Commander.

== Education ==
- University of Maryland
- USAF NCO Leadership School
- USAF Command NCO Academy
- USAF Senior NCO Academy

== Civil Air Patrol ==
=== Commands Held ===
- National Commander of the Civil Air Patrol - (August 17, 2011 – August 15, 2014)
- National Vice Commander of Civil Air Patrol - (September 4, 2010 – August 17, 2011)
- Great Lakes Region Commander - (March 1, 2007 – September 4, 2010)
- Ohio Wing Commander
- Ohio Wing Vice Commander
- Group VIII Commander
- Capt Eddie Rickenbacker Cadet Squadron 803 Commander

== Past Military Experience ==
He retired as a senior non-commissioned officer after serving 23 years in the United States Air Force.
