= Joseph Vazquez =

Previous national commander of the Civil Air Patrol

Joseph R. Vazquez
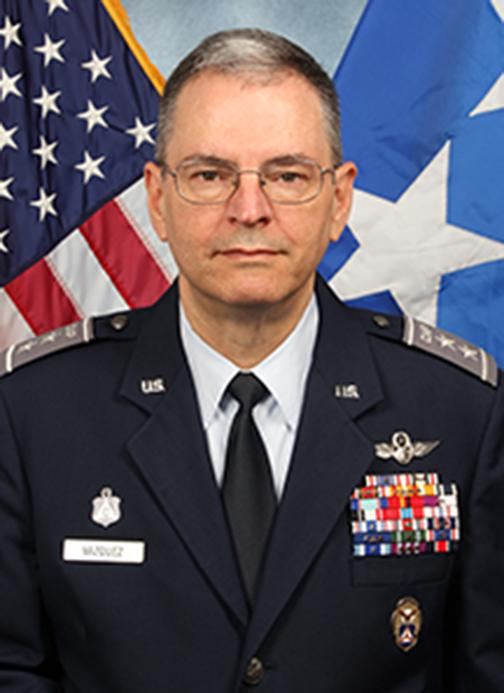
- Born: Savannah, Georgia, US
- Alma mater: University of Georgia (BS)
- Military career
- Allegiance: United States
- Branch: Civil Air Patrol
- Service years: 1975–present
- Rank: Major General
- Nickname: "Joe"
- Commands: CAP National Commander; CAP Mid-Atlantic Region; Virginia Wing
- Awards: Air Force Organizational Excellence Award; Distinguished Service Medal (3); Exceptional Service Award (3); Meritorious Service Award (4)

Joseph R. "Joe" Vazquez is a major general in the Civil Air Patrol. He served as the 23rd National Commander from 2014 to 2017. The non-profit organization, founded in 1941 and tasked as the Auxiliary of the United States Air Force, has 60,000 volunteers and three congressionally-chartered missions: Emergency Services, Cadet Programs (education and training program for youth ages 12–20), and Aerospace Education.

== Education ==
- Warner Robins High School
- University of Georgia - Bachelor of Science degrees in psychology and computer science

== Work experience ==
- E.I. Dupont
- Computer Sciences Corporation (1997 - 2010)

== Civil Air Patrol career ==
- Vazquez joined CAP in 1975 as a cadet in the Georgia Wing. He advanced in the cadet program to the grade of Cadet Major before becoming a senior member in 1978.
- He qualified as a CAP Ground Team Leader as a cadet.
- As a senior member, he qualified as a Mission Pilot, Flight Instructor, Check pilot, and Incident Commander.
- He was appointed to a three-year term as National Commander/CEO on April 4, 2014, assuming command on August 15, 2014. He succeeded Maj Gen Charles L. Carr Jr. As National Commander, he served as the highest ranking CAP Officer. General Vazquez also served as CAP's Chief Executive Officer and Advisor to the CAP Board of Governors (BoG), lead the CAP Command Council (CCC), and the CAP Senior Advisory Group (CSAG).
- On September 2, 2017, he relinquished his command to Maj Gen Mark Smith.

=== Commands held ===
- CAP National Commander (August 15, 2014 - September 2, 2017)
- CAP National Vice Commander (August 18, 2011 - August 15, 2014)
- Mid-Atlantic Region Commander (2008)
- Mid-Atlantic Region Vice Commander (2003)
- Virginia Wing Commander (2001)
- Virginia Wing Vice Commander (1997)
- Group 4 Commander, Virginia Wing (1994)
- Group 3 Commander, Maryland Wing (1993)
- Wicomico Composite Squadron, Maryland Wing (1990)
- Group 2 Commander, South Carolina Wing (1989)
