= Awards and decorations of the Civil Air Patrol =

United States Air Force Auxiliary awards

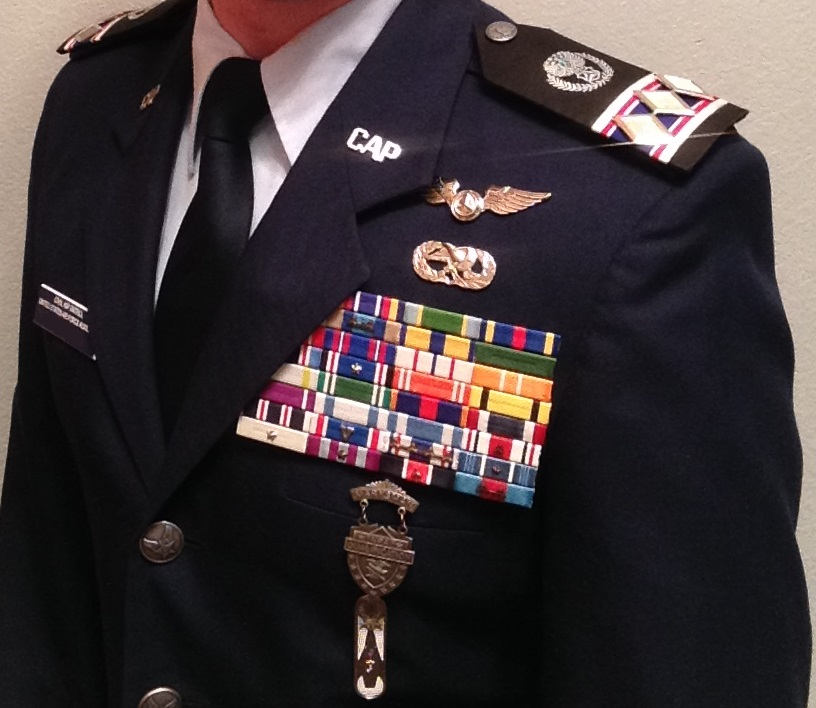
A CAP cadet colonel who is also a member of the United States Air Force, Air Force Reserve, or Air National Guard wearing the Air Force-style CAP service uniform with earned awards and decorations from both the USAF and CAP.

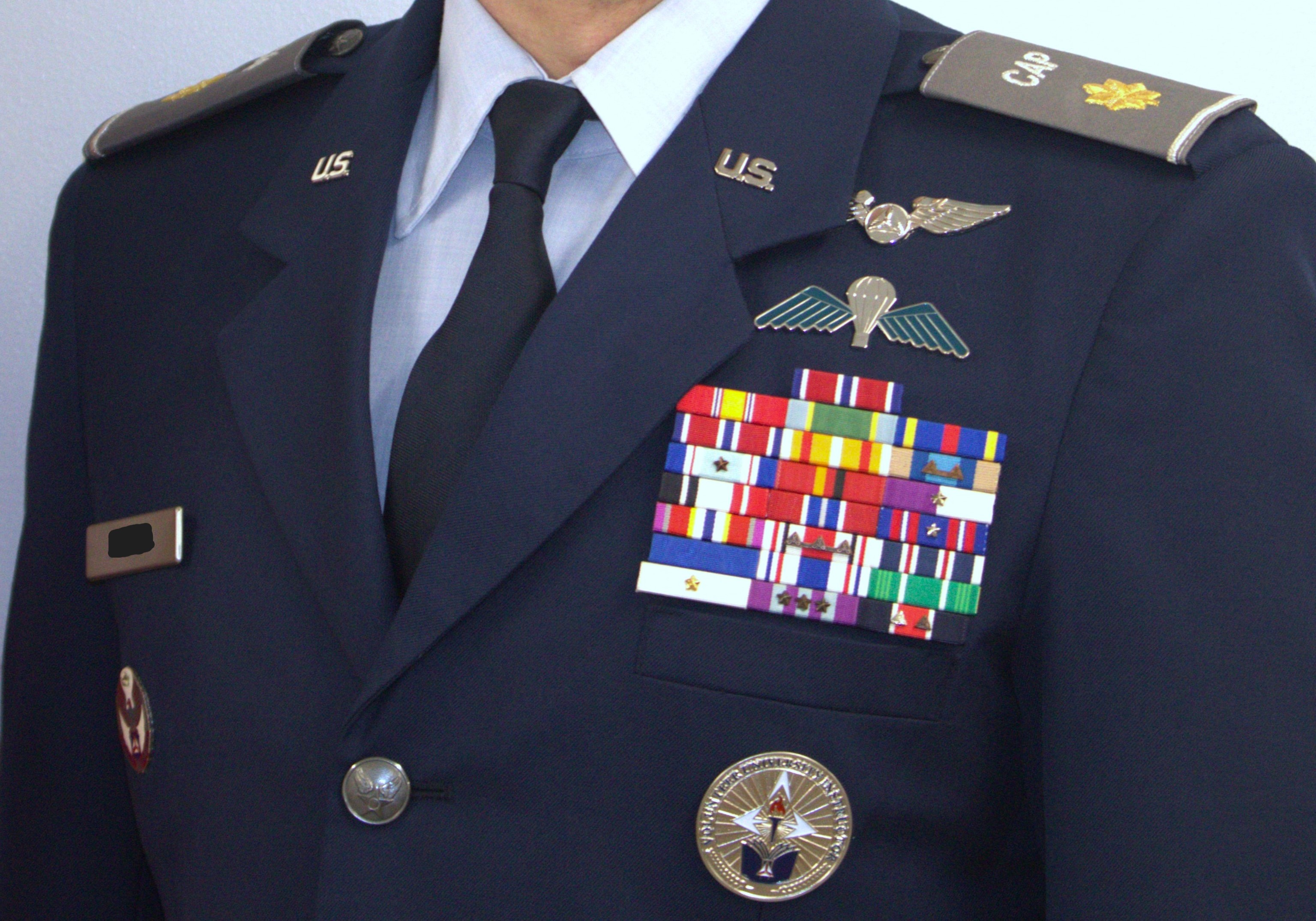
This member has been awarded two ASOEAs; one for service in Civil Air Patrol, and one during their Air Force service. CAP guidance dictates these awards cannot be combined given the nature of CAP's receipt of the award in 2016.

The awards and decorations of Civil Air Patrol are "designed to recognize heroism, service, and program achievements" of members of Civil Air Patrol (CAP) of the United States of America. CAP is the official auxiliary of the United States Air Force. These awards are made to improve the esprit de corps of members. These awards are all worn in the form of medals or ribbons and all are considered civilian decorations. Civil Air Patrol regulations allow them to only be worn and displayed on appropriate CAP uniforms.

In order to be considered for one of these awards, an individual must be a Civil Air Patrol member in good standing at the time of the act being recognized. There is a statute of limitations for these awards and all recommendations must be submitted within two years of the act being performed. It is possible for the next of kin of deceased persons to be presented awards to which a member was entitled, but which he or she did not receive. Award review boards are established at the region, wing, group, and squadron levels to consider recommendations for all awards and decorations.

== Decorations ==
Any Civil Air Patrol member may initiate a recommendation for the award of a decoration. Members initiating a recommendation must have knowledge of an act or service that merits recognition. Awards concerning commanders must be initiated at a higher command level or by the appointing authority for National Executive Committee (NEC) members. The authority to award decorations is vested in the NEC. The leader of the promotion and awards team of the NEC is authorized to approve all decorations in the name of the Committee. The Silver Medal of Valor, the Bronze Medal of Valor, and the Distinguished Service Medal are exceptions to this and must be approved by the full committee. Announcements of awarded decorations are made in personnel actions published by CAP National Headquarters.

=== Ribbons ===
==== Air and Space Organizational Excellence Award ====
Organizational Excellence ribbon

In 2016, the US Air Force presented the then-Air Force Organizational Excellence Award to all members of Civil Air Patrol in good standing who served a minimum of one day from October 1, 2012, to August 31, 2016. The Air Force presented the AFOEA for CAP's successful performance in the execution of its missions. Given the unique nature of CAP as an all-volunteer civilian organization, special instructions were given for wear of the award.

==== Silver Medal of Valor ====
Silver Medal of Valor ribbon

The Silver Medal of Valor is the highest decoration a Civil Air Patrol member can receive. It is awarded for "distinguished and conspicuous heroic action, at the risk of life, above and beyond the call of normal duty."

If the situation does not put a member's life in immediate danger, they may qualify for the Bronze Medal of Valor (see below). The same ribbon is used for both the Silver and Bronze Medals of Valor; with the exception that the Silver Medal of Valor ribbon has three silver star attachments. The basic ribbon (without attachments) represents the Bronze Medal of Valor.

==== Bronze Medal of Valor ====
Bronze Medal of Valor ribbon

The Bronze Medal of Valor is awarded to members for "distinguished and conspicuous heroic action where danger to self is probable and known." The Chairman of the National Awards Review Board is authorized to approve this medal for the National Executive Committee. If there arises a case in which a member is credited with saving a human life, but where the act does not meet the criteria for either the Silver Medal of Valor or the Bronze Medal of Valor, the member is generally recommended for a Certificate of Recognition of Lifesaving. The award for both of these medals of valor consists of the medal and ribbon and a certificate that accompanies the decoration. A miniature medal is available for senior members to wear on their mess dress uniforms.

==== Distinguished Service Medal ====
Distinguished Service Medal ribbon

The Distinguished Service Medal of Civil Air Patrol is awarded for "conspicuous performance of outstanding service in a duty of great responsibility where the position held and results obtained reflect upon the accomplishments and prestige of CAP on a national scale." The duties for which this medal are awarded must be extremely difficult and of importance to the national mission of CAP. This is the highest award for service given by CAP. Any member may nominate deserving cadets or officers for the award. All nominations are approved by CAP National Headquarters. If the act of service is deemed to be important at the region level or wing level, the member is generally recommended for the Exceptional Service Award or the Meritorious Service Award. This award consists of the medal itself along with a ribbon and certificate that accompanies the decoration. A miniature medal is available for senior members to wear on their mess dress uniforms.

==== Exceptional Service Award ====
Exceptional Service Award ribbon

The Exceptional Service Award is presented to Civil Air Patrol members who provide "exceptionally outstanding service to CAP...while serving in any capacity with CAP." The award regulations do make clear that the duty should carry the responsibility for completion of a major project at the region level or wing level. Any CAP member may nominate another cadet or officer for the exceptional service award, but the duty must involve the fulfillment of a duty that greatly benefits the region or wing. All nominations must be approved by the region or wing commander. This award does not come with a full-sized medal. It consists of a ribbon and a certificate that accompanies the decoration. A miniature medal is available for senior members to wear on their mess dress uniforms.

==== Meritorious Service Award ====
Meritorious Service Award ribbon

The Meritorious Service Award is awarded for "outstanding achievement or meritorious service rendered specifically on behalf of CAP." The regulations are quite clear that simply performing one's normal duties very well will not automatically qualify a member for this award. Instead, the award is meant for "achievements and services which are clearly outstanding and unmistakably exceptional," though not worthy of the Distinguished Service Medal or the Exceptional Service Award. When the award is made to individuals who are part of an exceptionally successful group of CAP members, the regulation states that the Meritorious Service Award should be presented only to those members whose efforts were clearly integral to the success of the program.

All nominations for this award must be approved by the region commander. Like the Exceptional Service Award, this award does not come with a full-sized medal. It consists of a ribbon and a certificate that accompanies the decoration. A miniature medal is available for senior members to wear on their mess dress uniforms.

==== Commander's Commendation Award ====
Commander's Commendation Award ribbon

The Commander's Commendation Award is presented to Civil Air Patrol members for "outstanding duty performance where achievements and services are clearly and unmistakably exceptional when compared to similar achievements and service of members of like rank and responsibility." As in the case of the Meritorious Service Award, when an award is made to individuals who are part of an exceptionally successful group of CAP members, the regulation states that the Commander's Commendation Award should be presented only to those members whose efforts were clearly integral to the success of the program. The Commander's Commendation Award differs from the Exceptional Service Award and the Meritorious Service Award in that the former does not require the performance "achievements and services significantly above and beyond normal duty performance." Nominations for this award may be approved by and the award may be presented by either a wing, region, or national commander. In each case, the award is slightly different depending on the authority by whom it is approved:

- the basic ribbon is awarded to members who earn the award as authorized by their wing commander
- a bronze star is added to the ribbon when the award is authorized by the region commander
- a silver star is added to the ribbon when the award is authorized by the National Commander

If a CAP member is presented with multiple awards, a clasp is placed to the left (from the point of view of the wearer) of a silver or bronze star. Only one star of each type will be worn on this award. Like the Exceptional Service Award and Meritorious Service Award, this commendation does not come with a full-sized medal. It consists of a ribbon and a certificate that accompanies the decoration. A miniature medal is available for senior members to wear on their mess dress uniforms.

==== Achievement Award ====
Achievement Award ribbon

Civil Air Patrol's Achievement Award is given to a member when the circumstances of their performance are above and beyond those of the member’s peers, but are insufficient to warrant a Commander's Commendation Award. The intent of the award is to empower wing and group commanders with the ability to recommend and present achievement awards locally. The official regulations state that the Achievement Award is "presented for outstanding service to the unit, group, or wing." It may be approved by a group commander and, if a group structure does not exist for a given squadron, the wing commander may designate who has the authority to approve this award. Like the other decorations below the level of Distinguished Service Medal, this award does not come with a full-sized medal of its own. It consists of a ribbon and a certificate that accompanies the decoration. A miniature medal is available for senior members to wear on their mess dress uniforms.

==== Certificate of Recognition for Lifesaving ====
Certificate of Recognition for Lifesaving ribbon

The Certificate of Recognition for Lifesaving is awarded to members of the Civil Air Patrol "who save a human life, but do not meet the criteria for the Bronze [Medal of Valor] or Silver Medal of Valor." A member may be awarded this decoration for participation in a transport mission of either blood or organs, in which case he or she is presented with a basic ribbon and a certificate that accompanies the decoration. A silver star is attached to the ribbon in recognition of lifesaving actions other than blood or organ transport which still do not meet the requirements of the higher awards. Subsequent awards are denoted by the addition of bronze and silver clasps to the ribbon. If more than three devices are authorized for wear on this ribbon, a second ribbon is worn to the left (from the point of view of the wearer) of the initial ribbon. If future awards reduce the total number of devices to three the second ribbon is removed.

All nominations for this award must be approved by the relevant CAP wing commander. This award does not come with a full-sized medal of its own, though a miniature medal is available for senior members to wear on their mess dress uniforms.

== Unit awards ==
=== National Commander’s Unit Citation Award ===
National Commander’s Unit Citation Award ribbon

The National Commander's Unit Citation Award was approved by Civil Air Patrol's National Board at its March 2006 meeting.." It is awarded to "units providing services or achievements above and beyond those normally recognized by a Unit Citation Award." Awards are made at the sole discretion of the National Commander of Civil Air Patrol. The ribbon of the award is worn by all cadets and officers who were members of the unit during the time period for which the citation is awarded. Once the award has been made, members may continue to wear the ribbon even if they transfer out of the unit at a later date. Units that have been given the National Commander's Unit Citation Award are entitled to attach a streamer to the colors displayed at the unit's headquarters. This award does not come with a full-sized medal of its own, though a miniature medal is available for senior members to wear on their mess dress uniforms that must be purchased through an outside vendor.

Although similar in appearance, this award is not to be confused with the Navy Expeditionary Medal

=== Unit Citation Award ===
Unit Citation Award ribbon

The Civil Air Patrol Unit Citation Award is presented for "exceptionally meritorious service or exceptionally outstanding achievement." This service and achievement must be clearly above that which is performed by other similar units. Members are awarded the Unit Citation Award ribbon if they were members of the unit during the time period for which the citation is awarded. Units can be awarded this citation as a result of extended meritorious service over the course of at least one year, or in recognition of outstanding achievements in a single specific act or notable accomplishment that is separate and distinct from the normal mission or regular function of the unit. The periods of outstanding achievement are normally characterized by definite beginning and ending dates. Units that have been given the Unit Citation Award are entitled to attach a streamer to the colors displayed at the unit's headquarters. This award does not come with a full-sized medal of its own, though a miniature medal is available for senior members to wear on their mess dress uniforms that must be purchased through an outside vendor.

== Senior awards ==
=== Professional development awards ===
To accomplish its mission, the Civil Air Patrol requires an informed and active senior membership trained in leadership, management, and functional tasks. The Senior Member Professional Development Program prepares members to serve their units, their communities, and their nation. The professional development ribbons are awarded by National Headquarters to denote the level of achievement that a senior member has achieved in this program. The professional development program is divided into five levels.

==== Gill Robb Wilson Award ====
Gill Robb Wilson Award ribbon

The Gill Robb Wilson Award was first implemented in 1964 to replace the National Commander’s Citation. It is named after Gill Robb Wilson, the first director of CAP, and is presented to senior members who complete the fifth level of training in the Senior Member Professional Development Program. This award is issued directly from Civil Air Patrol National Headquarters and is the highest award in the professional development program. This level of training is intended for those performing duty as commanders or staff officers, and is a prerequisite for consideration for duty performance promotion to the grade of lieutenant colonel in CAP. The training program concentrates on advanced leadership and management subjects. This award does not come with a full-sized medal. It consists of a ribbon and a certificate. Members who complete Squadron Officer School, Air Command and Staff College, or Air War College are authorized to wear a bronze, silver, or gold star (respectively) on the award ribbon. If multiple stars would be authorized, the highest star is placed on the Gill Rob Wilson ribbon, and the second highest on the Paul E. Garber ribbon. A miniature medal is available for members to wear on their mess dress uniforms.

==== Paul E. Garber Award ====
Paul E. Garber Award ribbon

The Paul E. Garber Award is presented to Civil Air Patrol senior members who complete the level IV requirements of the Senior Member Professional Development Program. Like the Gill Robb Wilson Award, this is issued directly from CAP National Headquarters. The award is named after Paul Garber who served in both World War I and World War II before becoming the first curator of the National Air and Space Museum. The Paul E. Garber Award is a prerequisite for any senior member to be considered for duty a performance promotion to the grade of major in CAP. This level of training concentrates on members desiring to become leaders within CAP. Every wing commander and region commander—and those members being groomed to replace them—is encouraged to complete the level IV training and earn the Paul E. Garber Award. Like the Gill Robb Wilson Award, there is no full-sized medal for this award. It consists of a ribbon and a certificate. Members who complete Squadron Officer School, Air Command and Staff College, or Air War College are authorized to wear a bronze, silver, or gold star (respectively) on the award ribbon. If multiple stars would be authorized and the member has received the Gill Robb Wilson award, the highest star is placed on the Gill Rob Wilson ribbon, and the second highest on the Paul E. Garber ribbon. A miniature medal is available for members to wear on their mess dress uniforms.

==== Grover Loening Aerospace Award ====
Grover Loening Aerospace Award ribbon

The Grover Loening Aerospace Award is presented to senior members who successfully complete the third level of the professional development program. The award is issued directly from CAP National Headquarters in the form of a certificate. There is also a ribbon and a miniature medal available for members to purchase for wear on their uniforms. The award is named for aerospace manufacturer Grover Cleveland Loening. This portion of the professional development program was designed for senior members serving as squadron, group, or wing commanders and for CAP staff officers. In order to qualify for this award, members must complete their level III training, have one year of experience in a command or staff position, attain a senior rating in any CAP specialty track, and attend two wing, region, or national conferences. The Loening Award is a prerequisite for consideration for duty performance promotion to the grade of captain in CAP.

==== Benjamin O. Davis, Jr. Award ====
The Benjamin O. Davis, Jr. Award is presented to senior members who successfully complete the second level of professional development. It is named for Benjamin O. Davis, an aviation pioneer and commander of the Tuskegee Airmen during World War II. Members must complete the technical training required for the Leadership Award. There is no ribbon associated with this award and members receive a certificate. The Davis Award is a prerequisite for consideration for duty performance promotion to the grade of first lieutenant in CAP.

==== Leadership Award ====
Leadership Award ribbon

Leadership Award ribbon with 1 Bronze Star

The Leadership Award is presented to senior CAP members who complete training to earn a technician rating in one of 26 specialty tracks. If members obtain a senior rating in a specialty track, they are authorized to wear a bronze star on the Leadership Award ribbon. A silver star is awarded for a higher master rating. This award does not come with a full-sized medal. It consists of a ribbon and a certificate. A miniature medal is available for members to wear on their mess dress uniforms. Unlike the three more senior professional development awards in the Civil Air Patrol senior program, this award is not named after an aviation pioneer or notable person associated with CAP.

==== Membership Award ====
Membership Award ribbon

The most basic professional development award in CAP program is the Membership Award. This is presented to any senior member who successfully completes the level I Orientation Course. Completion of this course, and the qualification for the Membership Awards, is a prerequisite for participation in most areas of the Civil Air Patrol mission and for duty performance promotion to second lieutenant in CAP. There are four modules required for completion of this level. They are a basic foundations course, a cadet protection program training, operations security awareness training, and equal opportunity training. The intent of this level I training "is to provide new members the information they need to begin their service in CAP successfully." This award does not come with a full-sized medal. It consists of a ribbon and a certificate. A miniature medal is available for members to wear on their mess dress uniforms. The Membership Award is a prerequisite for consideration for duty performance promotion to the grade of second lieutenant after completion of Level 2, Part one of Senior Member training in CAP.

=== Cadet Orientation Pilot Ribbon ===
Cadet orientation pilot ribbon

Awarded to members who provide 50 cadet orientation flights. Each cadet receiving credit for the flight, may be counted toward the total of 50. A bronze clasp may be added for each additional 50 flights.

=== Senior Member Recruiter Ribbon ===
Senior Member Recruitment Ribbon

The Senior Member Recruiter Ribbon is given to senior members who recruit seven new qualified cadets or senior members for CAP. For each additional ten members recruited, a bronze clasp may be worn on the ribbon. Once a senior member earns five bronze clasps, they may be replaced by a silver clasp. Bronze clasps are no longer worn after a silver clasp is received. For every fifty new members recruited after this, an additional silver clasp may be worn on the ribbon. Members recruited as cadets may be included in determining entitlement in the case of senior members who were former cadets.

== Aerospace education awards ==
The aerospace education awards are presented to senior members who excel in furthering the educational aspects of Civil Air Patrol's mission. These two awards are made to recognize completion of steps in the professional development program related specifically to aerospace education.

=== A. Scott Crossfield Award ===
A. Scott Crossfield Award ribbon

The A. Scott Crossfield Award is named after American naval officer and test pilot Albert Scott Crossfield. The award is made by Civil Air Patrol national headquarters. The Crossfield Award is presented to members who have "earned the master level rating in the aerospace education specialty track and served as aerospace education officer." This award does not come with a full-sized medal. It consists of a ribbon and a certificate. A miniature medal is available for members to purchase for wear on their mess dress uniforms.

=== Brigadier General Charles E. "Chuck" Yeager Aerospace Education Achievement Award ===
Brigadier General Charles E. "Chuck" Yeager Award ribbon

The Brigadier General Charles E. "Chuck" Yeager Aerospace Education Achievement Award is presented to senior members who successfully complete Civil Air Patrol's Aerospace Education Program for Senior Members (AEPSM). This is assessed through a test that senior members may complete online or using traditional means. Upon validation of the test results, a certificate is issued by the member's wing. This award does not come with a full-sized medal. The miniature medal—for wear on their mess dress uniforms—and the ribbon may be purchased by individual recipients from appropriate commercial sources. This award is named for the late United States Air Force brigadier general and noted test pilot, Charles E. “Chuck” Yeager.

== Emergency services ribbons ==
=== Rescue "Find" Ribbon ===
Find ribbon

The Rescue Find Ribbon is awarded to any CAP member by his or her wing commander for making a find (distress or non-distress) on a search and rescue mission. A distress find involves a downed aircraft or persons in distress. Normally, a definite search objective must have been assigned, located, and positively identified. Other finds are classified as non-distress; such as locating a non-distress emergency locator transmitter. The basic ribbon is awarded for a first find (distress or non-distress). A bronze clasp is awarded for each additional distress find or for each additional 20 non-distress finds. Both aircrew and ground team members may receive credit for finds. The "Find" Ribbon may also be painted on the aircraft in which the find was made.

1. Finds for the United States Coast Guard. Exceptions to the above criteria may be made for finds accomplished during missions conducted in concert with the USCG or USCG Auxiliary. The bulk of this joint effort consists of CAP flying patrol missions commonly referred to as a “sundown patrol.” When a CAP member or crew locates a boat or persons in distress and is instrumental in their discovery, credit for a distress find may be granted and a “find” ribbon awarded, provided the effort is classified as an assist by the USCG.
2. Finds by Aircrew Members. In case of a search and rescue find by aircraft, a ribbon will be awarded to all crew members. A bronze three-bladed propeller device is also worn on the ribbon for finds as aircrew members. This applies to both “find and rescue” operations and “find and report” operations. For example, when the search objective is sighted, rescue by aircraft may be impossible so the crew reports the find by relaying the information to an official ground station.
3. Finds by Ground Personnel. If the find is made by search and rescue ground teams, the ribbon will be awarded to all members of the team which locates the objective. Ground personnel are not awarded the propeller clasp.
4. Combined Participation. Members who earn the ribbon as aircrew are identified by the bronze propeller attached to the ribbon. If the same individual earn a clasp as a ground member who makes a find, they are authorized to attach the clasp to the same ribbon with the bronze propeller. This also applies to the individual who initially earns the Search “Find” Ribbon as a member of a ground search party and at some later date makes a find as an aircrew member. The member is then authorized to attach the bronze propeller to the ribbon.

=== Air Search and Rescue Ribbon ===
Air search and rescue ribbon

The Air Search and Rescue Ribbon is awarded to members who actively participate in at least 10 search and rescue sorties, with a bronze clasp awarded for each additional 10 sorties. All sorties must be in support of an actual search and rescue mission authorized through appropriate authorities.

1. Aircrew Members. A bronze three-bladed propeller device will be worn centered on Air Search and Rescue Ribbons earned as aircrew members.
2. Ground Personnel. Credit given will be computed on the basis of time spent on a mission and the nature of the duties performed.
  1. Ground personnel performing hazardous duties, such as ground rescue or ground search, may be credited with one sortie for each 4 hours of actual participation, not to exceed three sorties in any 24-hour period.
  2. Ground personnel performing non-hazardous duties, such as base support or staff functions, may be credited with one sortie for each 8 hours of participation, not to exceed two sorties for any 24-hour period.
3. Combined Participation. Members who earn the Air Search and Rescue Ribbon as an aircrew member are identified by attaching a bronze propeller to the ribbon. If the same individual earn clasps as a ground member of searches or missions, they are authorized to attach the clasps to the same ribbon with the bronze propeller. This also applies to the individual who initially earned the Air Search and Rescue Ribbon as a member of a ground search party and later participates in enough searches as an aircrew member. Additional clasps are placed so that the ribbon will have a balanced appearance, with bronze propeller(s) in the middle of the ribbon. A silver clasp is used in place of five bronze clasps for member who have participated in fifty additional sorties.

=== Counterdrug Ribbon ===
Counterdrug ribbon

The Counterdrug Ribbon is awarded to Senior Members for participation in 10 counterdrug sorties. A bronze clasp is awarded for each additional 10 sorties, and replaced by a silver clasp after 50 additional sorties. Cadets are prohibited from participating in Counterdrug operations.

Although similar in appearance, this award is not to be confused with the Navy/Marine Corps Commendation Medal.

=== Disaster Relief Ribbon ===
Disaster relief ribbon

The Disaster Relief Ribbon is awarded for participation in five actual/evaluated disaster relief missions and completion of two of the following requirements: (1) All of the following Red Cross courses: (a) Introduction to Disaster Services: How the Red Cross Chapter Renders Emergency Assistance (b) Disaster Damage Assessment (c) Shelter Management (2) The Red Cross course, Damage Assessment Supervision in Disaster (3) The Red Cross course, Cardio-Pulmonary Resuscitation and Advanced First Aid (4) Radiological Monitoring for Instructors (5) Radiological Defense Officer Course (6) Airborne Radiological Monitoring Course (7) Participation in other equivalent disaster relief activities totaling at least 40 hours of activity certified by disaster relief agency. This could include any training similar to the above courses and/or actual mission activity (in addition to the five required missions).

The Disaster Relief Ribbon may be awarded with a Silver "V" device to any CAP member who participates as a CAP member in a disaster relief effort for a Presidential declared disaster. Participation in any Presidential declared disaster since 1990 qualifies.

=== Homeland Security Ribbon ===
Homeland Security ribbon

The Homeland Security Ribbon is awarded for participation in ten Homeland Security sorties, as defined by the tasking organization, which are in the interest of the defense and/or security of the United States. All members participating in the mission in any capacity may be eligible for the ribbon. Personnel performing duties, such as base support or staff functions, may be credited with one sortie for each 8 hours of participation, but may not to exceed two sorties for any 24-hour period.

Clasps may be added to the ribbon for participation in every ten additional sorties.

== Service ribbons ==
=== Command Service Ribbon ===
Command service ribbon

Awarded to Senior Members who have served at least 1 year continuous service as commander — squadron, group, wing, etc. (Completion of Level II of the CAP Senior Member Education & Training Program (See CAPR 40-1) is required before assignment.) The basic ribbon is awarded for service as a squadron commander. A bronze star is added to denote service as group commander, a silver star for wing commander, and a gold star for region commander service. Two gold stars will be used to denote service as National Commander. Only one level of command may be shown on the ribbon.

=== CAP Crisis Service Ribbon ===
Crisis service ribbon

First awarded to all active CAP members on December 1, 2021, CAP Crisis Service Ribbon was established to recognize CAP membership during periods when the entire organization was under significant stress responding to a lengthy, nationwide emergency.

The National Commander will determine when to grant this award and the period of service involved. This award ranks immediately before the Red Service Ribbon in the order of precedence. Only one award is earned per service period; awards during additional periods are recognized by the wear of the bronze triangle clasp.

Any active member (cadet/senior/50-year or life) who has served at least 1 day in active status during the period is eligible to wear the ribbon. When the National Commander issues the award, individual member records will be automatically updated to reflect the award.

In a letter attached to the interim change letter authorizing the award, CAP National Commander Major General Edward D. Phelka stated, "Beginning in March 2020, the COVID-19 pandemic resulted in CAP’s most noteworthy national service since World War II. Regular operations continued while new missions were explored, millions of meals delivered to the needy, thousands of blood donations were made, and distribution of masks and vaccines were completed across the country. At a time when simply holding regular squadron meetings was challenging due to isolation restrictions, CAP members served the Nation and ensured CAP’s continued operation. In recognition of this effort, I have approved the award of CAP Crisis Service Ribbon to all active members who served at least one day after 1 March 2020 to a future point to be determined by CAP."

On October 25, 2022, Major General Phelka remarked, in a letter to CAP members, that "since the crisis nature of the pandemic and its impact on CAP appears to be behind us, I am declaring an official end to the awarding of CAP’s Crisis Service Ribbon in response to the pandemic, effective Oct. 31" in 2022.

=== Red Service Ribbon ===
Red service ribbon

The Red Service Ribbon is given to any member of Civil Air Patrol who has been a member of the program for two years (as a cadet or Senior Member in good standing.) In addition, the following devices are awarded for additional years of service.

- A first Bronze Clasp is awarded at the end of 3 additional years (total of 5 years).
- Additional Bronze Clasps are awarded for each additional 5 years of service. A maximum of three bronze clasps (denoting 15 years of service) will be worn.
- Longevity Devices, A metal number, denoting years of service, awarded at the end of 20 years and in increments of 5 years thereafter. The longevity device is worn centered on the red service ribbon and the bronze clasps are no longer worn.

=== Community Service Award ===
Community service ribbon

The Community Service Ribbon is awarded to senior members and cadets who complete 60 hours of community service. The community service is done outside of Civil Air Patrol, and is verified by someone other than the member. Civil Air Patrol headquarters has now authorized the wear of a bronze device for every additional 60 hours of community service.

=== Cadet Advisory Council Ribbon ===
Cadet advisory council ribbon

The Cadet Advisory Council Ribbon is awarded to the members of a CAC after the conclusion of the term. A shoulder cord is worn while a cadet is a primary representative, while the ribbon continues to be worn even after the cadet is no longer on the CAC and is also awarded to alternate representatives. The wear policy for the Cadet Advisory Council Ribbon was changed in 2007 to allow senior members who earned this ribbon as a cadet to continue wearing the ribbon with the appropriate clasp.

A ribbon awarded for service on a group CAC has no attachments, and primary representatives wear a green shoulder cord. At the wing level, the ribbon has a bronze star attachment and primary representatives wear a red shoulder cord. At a region CAC, the ribbon has a silver star and primary representatives wear a blue shoulder cord. A national level ribbon has a gold star attached and primary representatives wear a gold shoulder cord.

== Programs ribbons ==
These ribbons are awarded to members for participating in or providing leadership for National Cadet Special Activities, encampments, or other cadet activities.

=== Encampment Ribbon ===
Encampment ribbon

The Encampment Ribbon is awarded to all cadets and seniors who complete a Civil Air Patrol Encampment successfully. Clasps may be attached for repetitive awards. Cadet encampments, usually a week in length, provide cadets with an intense look at military life. Encampment attendance is a prerequisite for the Gen. Billy Mitchell Award. Senior members may also be awarded the ribbon for providing leadership at CAP encampments. To graduate encampment, you must complete 80% of all planned encampment activities.

=== Cadet Special Activities Ribbon ===
Cadet Special Activities ribbon

Awarded to cadets and officers who participate in National Cadet Special Activities. Participants must be identified by the Civil Air Patrol project officer and approved by the member’s region commander. Each subsequent activity is represented by a bronze star affixed to the basic ribbon. Cadets earning this ribbon may continue to wear the ribbon as a Senior Member.

=== National Cadet Competition Ribbon ===
National cadet competition ribbon

Awarded to cadets for participation as a team member in the National Cadet Competition. The basic ribbon will be worn by the winner of the wing competition and/or cadets selected to represent the wing at a region competition. A bronze star will be affixed for the winners of the region competition, and a silver star will be worn by the sweepstakes winners of the national competition. Repetitive awards may be recognized by wearing additional stars in the appropriate competition level, or Bronze triangle clasps for additional wins at Wing level or representing their wing to Region. Officers who earned this ribbon as a cadet may continue to wear the ribbon. In November 1998, CAP's National Executive Committee approved an addendum to the regulation governing the wear of this ribbon; it authorizes Officers who acted as official escorts to the above-mentioned championship teams to also wear the ribbon. This addendum will be incorporated into the next draft of the regulation.

=== National Cadet Color Guard Competition Ribbon ===
National color guard competition ribbon

Awarded to cadets for participation as a team member in the National Color Guard Competition. The basic ribbon will be worn by the winner of the wing competition and/or cadets selected to represent the wing at a region competition. A bronze star will be affixed for the winners of the region competition, and a silver star will be worn by the sweepstakes winner of the national competition. Repetitive awards may be recognized by wearing additional stars in the appropriate competition level, or Bronze triangle clasps for additional wins at Wing level or representing their wing to Region. In November 1998, CAP's National Executive Committee approved an addendum to the regulation governing the wear of this ribbon; it authorizes Officers who acted as official escorts to the above-mentioned championship teams to also wear the ribbon. This addendum will be incorporated into the next draft of the regulation. Senior Members who earned this ribbon as a cadet may continue to wear the ribbon.

=== International Air Cadet Exchange Ribbon ===
International Air Cadet Exchange ribbon

Awarded to cadets and officer escorts participating in the International Air Cadet Exchange (IACE) outside the continental limits of the United States. IACE is a program open to Cadets 17 or older who have earned the Earhart Award (Cadet Captains and above) to visit participating foreign countries.

== Cadet achievement awards ==
These awards are given to cadets who pass their unit tests, and also accompany an advancement in grade. Cadets who become Senior Members may wear only their highest ranking cadet achievement ribbon on their senior member uniform.

=== General Carl A. Spaatz Award ===
Carl A. Spaatz ribbon

The General Carl A. Spaatz Award is Civil Air Patrol's highest cadet award and honor. The award honors General Carl A. Spaatz, who was the first Chief of Staff of the United States Air Force and the second National Commander of Civil Air Patrol. Only 0.5% of cadets will ever achieve this award. As of July 2024, only 2,525 cadets have earned it since the award's inception in 1964.

The Spaatz Award may be awarded to cadets who "successfully complete all phases of CAP cadet program and the General Carl A. Spaatz Award examination" consisting of a comprehensive leadership and aerospace education written examination, a graded essay and a physical fitness test. To attain the rank of Cadet Colonel, cadets must devote an average of 5 years of service, complete 19 successive rank examinations, pass three promotion boards, a timed 60-question comprehensive exam on leadership theory and CAP regulations, a timed, 60-question comprehensive aerospace exam, pass a timed essay on a question of perennial moral debate where you must argue for/against an issue on moral grounds/making appeals to reason, and pass the United States Air Force Academy Candidate Fitness Assessment. Only three attempts are authorized. The Spaatz Award is arguably the most difficult honor to earn in CAP cadet program.

Cadets earning Spaatz Award are also promoted to Cadet Colonel, the highest grade obtainable in the cadet program. Upon reaching the age of 21, cadet colonels are eligible to transfer to the Civil Air Patrol Officer program with appointment to the grade of Captain, after completion of Level 2, Part one, of Senior Member training. Cadet Colonels who voluntarily transfer to the officer program between the ages of 18 and 21 receive the grade senior flight officer.

External links

- Spaatz Award – CAP
- Spaatz Association web site

=== General Ira C. Eaker Award ===
Ira C. Eaker ribbon

The General Ira C. Eaker Award is given by Civil Air Patrol in honor of the former Deputy Commander U.S. Army Air Forces and aviation pioneer. It is presented on behalf of CAP by CAP National Headquarters to cadets who have completed the specific requirements in the Phase IV of the cadet program. The award is accompanied by promotion to the grade of Cadet Lieutenant Colonel.

External links

- Eaker Award – CAP

=== Amelia Earhart Award ===
Amelia Earhart ribbon

The Amelia Earhart Award is a cadet achievement of Civil Air Patrol presented in honor of Amelia Earhart, pioneering aviator and aviation record-setter. This award is presented on behalf of CAP National Headquarters to denote the successful completion of the specific requirements in Phase III of this program. Cadets receiving the Earhart Award are promoted to Cadet Captain.

Cadets who receive this award can be promoted to 1st Lt once a senior member at the age of 21, after completion of Level 2, Part one, of Senior Member training. Cadet captains who voluntarily transfer to the senior program between the ages of 18 and 21 receive the grade of Technical Flight Officer, after completion of Level 2, Part one of Senior Member training

External links

- Earhart Award – CAP

=== General Billy Mitchell Award ===
Billy Mitchell ribbon

The General Billy Mitchell Award is earned by Civil Air Patrol cadets who have successfully completed the second phase of the cadet program. It marks the end of the enlisted phase of the cadet program; cadets are promoted to Cadet Second Lieutenants upon receipt and, by extension, Cadet Officers. The award is given in honor of Brig Gen William "Billy" Mitchell, former Deputy Chief of the Army Air Service and military aviation visionary.

In order to earn this award, cadets must pass a series of leadership, aerospace and physical fitness tests and attend character development training for each achievement from Cadet Airman Basic through Cadet Chief Master Sergeant. In addition, cadets must attend a military-style encampment before this award is made, and have maintained active membership in Civil Air Patrol for at least 18 months since joining. 15% of Civil Air Patrol cadets achieve the Mitchell Award.

Cadets who receive this award can be promoted to 2nd Lt once a senior member at the age of 21, after completion of Level 2, Part one, of Senior Member training.

Mitchell Cadets who choose to enlist in the United States Space Force, United States Air Force, the United States Army or the United States Coast Guard are promoted to E-3 upon enlistment and completion of Basic Military Training (or equivalent) instead of E-1. Mitchell Cadets who enlist in the United States Marine Corps or United States Navy are mustered in at E-2.. A silver star is worn on the ribbon to denote successful completion of Cadet Officer School.

External links

- Mitchell Award – CAP

=== Neil Armstrong Achievement ===
Neil Armstrong ribbon

The Neil Armstrong Achievement is awarded for successfully completing the specific requirements of Achievement 8 in Phase II of the Civil Air Patrol cadet program. Awarded for the second achievement of Cadet Chief Master Sergeant. A silver star is worn on the ribbon to denote completion of honor credit when promoting.

=== Dr. Robert H. Goddard Achievement ===
Robert H. Goddard ribbon

The Dr. Robert H. Goddard Achievement is awarded for successfully completing the specific requirements of Achievement 7 in Phase II of the Civil Air Patrol cadet program. Accompanies promotion to Cadet Chief Master Sergeant. A silver star worn on the ribbon denotes successful completion of the Model Rocketry Badge requirements (if Mitchell Award has been earned). A silver star is also worn on the ribbon to denote completion of honor credit when promoting. Two silver stars may be worn if honor credit and the Model Rocketry badge were earned.

=== General Jimmy Doolittle Achievement ===
Jimmy Doolittle ribbon

The General Jimmy Doolittle Achievement is awarded for successfully completing the specific requirements of Achievement 6 in Phase II of the Civil Air Patrol cadet program. Accompanies promotion to Cadet Senior Master Sergeant. A silver star is worn on the ribbon to denote completion of honor credit when promoting.

=== Achievement 5 ===
Achievement 5 ribbon

The 5th Achievement is awarded (known as the Charles Lindbergh Achievement prior to October 2021) for successfully completing the specific requirements of Achievement 5 in Phase II of the Civil Air Patrol cadet program. Accompanies promotion to the grade of Cadet Master Sergeant. A silver star is worn on the ribbon to denote completion of honor credit when promoting.

=== Captain Eddie Rickenbacker Achievement ===
Eddie Rickenbacker ribbon

Captain Eddie Rickenbacker Achievement is awarded for successfully completing the specific requirements of Achievement 4 in Phase II of the Civil Air Patrol cadet program. Accompanies promotion to the grade of Cadet Technical Sergeant. A silver star is worn on the ribbon to denote completion of honor credit when promoting.

=== Wright Brothers Award ===
Wright Brothers ribbon

The Wright Brothers Award is awarded for successfully completing the Phase I of the Civil Air Patrol cadet program. It marks the transition of a cadet to the non-commissioned officer status in the Civil Air Patrol cadet program, and accompanies promotion to the grade of Cadet Staff Sergeant.

Prior to the creation of the Mary Feik Achievement in April 2003, the Wright Brothers award was the 3rd Achievement and accompanied promotion to the grade of Cadet Senior Airman.

=== Mary Feik Achievement ===
Mary Feik ribbon

The Mary Feik Achievement is awarded for successfully completing the specific requirements of Achievement 3 in Phase I of the cadet program. Accompanies promotion to the grade of Cadet Senior Airman. A silver star is worn on the ribbon to denote completion of honor credit when promoting.

=== General H. H. "Hap" Arnold Achievement ===
H. H. "Hap" Arnold ribbon

Named after General "Hap" Arnold, first U.S. Air Force Commander. The General H. H. "Hap" Arnold Achievement is awarded for successfully completing the specific requirements of Achievement 2 in Phase I of the cadet program. Accompanies promotion to the grade of Cadet Airman First Class. A silver star is worn on the ribbon to denote completion of honor credit when promoting.

=== General J. F. Curry Achievement ===
J. F. Curry ribbon

Named after General John F. Curry, first National Commander of Civil Air Patrol. The General J. F. Curry Achievement is awarded for successfully completing the specific requirements of Achievement 1 in Phase I of the cadet program. Cadets must attempt the Physical Fitness test, successfully complete the Learn to Lead chapter 1 test, and have participated in at least 1 character development class. Accompanies promotion to the grade of Cadet Airman. A silver star is worn on the ribbon to denote completion of honor credit when promoting.

== Cadet awards ==
=== Air & Space Forces Association Award to Outstanding Unit Cadet of the Year ===
AFA Outstanding Unit Cadet of the Year ribbon

This award from the Air & Space Forces Association recognizes one outstanding cadet per unit each year.

=== Air Force Sergeants Association Award to Unit Cadet NCO of the Year ===
AFSA NCO cadet of the year ribbon

This is an annual award established by the Air Force Sergeants Association to recognize the outstanding CAP cadet NCO in each squadron.

=== VFW Award for Unit Cadet Officer of the Year ===
VFW cadet officer of the year ribbon

The Veterans of Foreign Wars recognize excellence in CAP cadet officers through an annual award to an outstanding cadet officer in each CAP squadron.

CAP squadron commanders may nominate one cadet officer each year for the award by submitting a nomination to the VFW detailing the cadet's accomplishments and certifying that cadet officer is in good standing academically, progressing satisfactorily in CAP cadet program, demonstrated outstanding achievement in community service and the cadet program. The cadet must also be of high moral character, demonstrate a high level of professionalism in appearance and action and patriotism, actively promote Americanism, and demonstrate growth potential. A cadet may only receive this award once.

=== VFW Award for Unit Cadet NCO of the Year ===
VFW cadet NCO of the year ribbon

The VFW recognizes excellence in CAP cadet non-commissioned officers (NCO) through an annual award to an outstanding cadet NCO in each CAP squadron. Squadron commanders nominate one cadet NCO per year to the VFW, the same process as the VFW Cadet Officer of the Year award. The award criteria are the same as the cadet officer award. A cadet may only receive this award once.

=== Cadet Recruiter Ribbon ===
Cadet Recruiter Ribbon

The Cadet Recruiter Ribbon is given to cadets who recruit two or more people into Civil Air Patrol. Cadets may attach a bronze clasp to the ribbon for every two additional members recruited, and may attach a silver clasp to replace five bronze clasps. Bronze clasps are no longer worn after a silver clasp is received. An additional silver clasp is awarded for each additional 10 members recruited. When transitioning to senior membership, members recruited as a cadet count towards credit for the Senior Member Recruiter Ribbon.

== Frank F. Borman Falcon Award (obsolete) ==
Frank F. Borman Falcon ribbon

The Frank F. Borman Falcon Award was awarded to former Cadets who completed the Spaatz Award and who took subsequent steps to become dynamic Americans and aerospace leaders. Specifically, 1) secured admission to any military service academy and successfully completed the second year of instruction, 2) Secured admission to advanced ROTC program of any service in an accredited college of university, or 3) Become an active Senior Member of CAP for at least one year and be recommended by the unit Commander.

This award was unique in that it is specifically authorized for award to non-CAP members: former Spaatz cadets who qualified based on their military training were encouraged to apply to Civil Air Patrol National Headquarters for the Falcon Award, even if they were no longer CAP members.

The Falcon Award was discontinued in 1979. Senior Members who were awarded the Falcon Award may continue to wear it as their highest cadet award with their other ribbons. Also, any Senior Member who was previously a CAP Cadet is authorized to wear the highest Cadet achievement award.

Chronology of the Falcon Award

== Badges ==
As described in CAPR 39-1 Uniform Manual, badges are categorized into aviation, occupational, specialty, and service. Some badges may indicate a level of skill above basic with a rating device affixed on top. A "star" indicates a senior skill. A "star with laurel wreath" indicates master (ex. ground team) or command (ex. pilot).

=== Aviation Badges ===
==== Aeronautical ====
Airplane Pilot

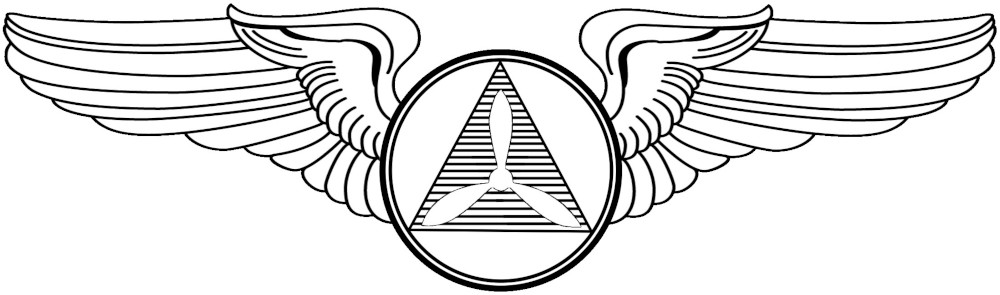

Balloon Pilot

Glider Pilot

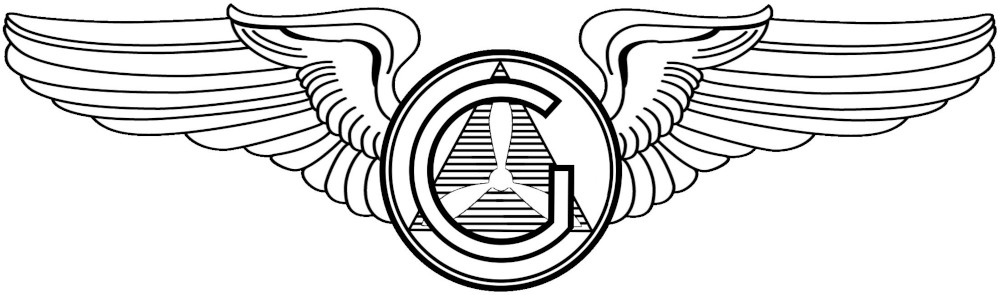

Airplane Solo

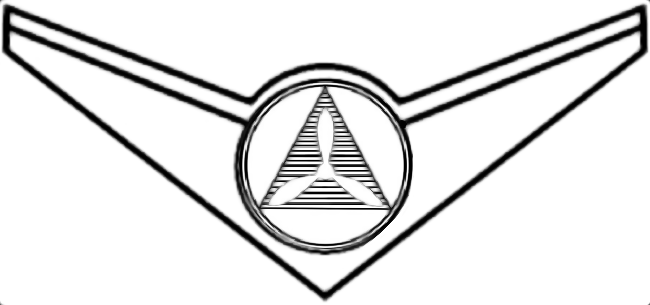

Pre-solo

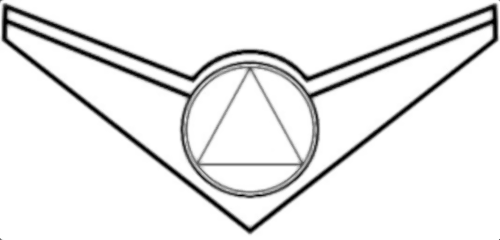

sUAS Pilot

Cadet Model Rocketry

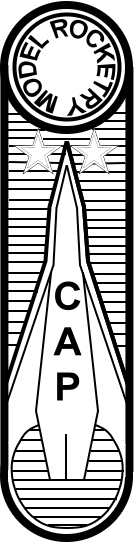

==== Aircrew ====
Observer Badge

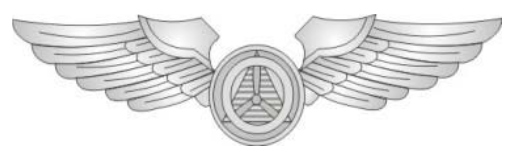

Aircrew Badge

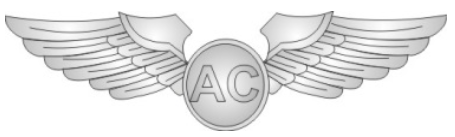

=== Occupational Badges ===
==== Chaplain ====
Buddhist

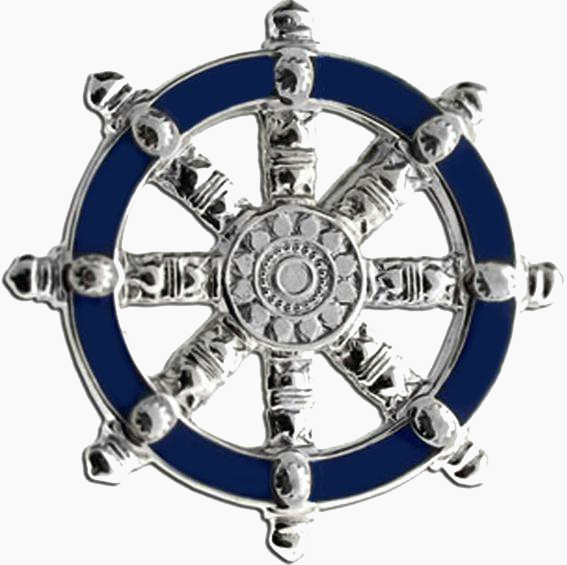

Christian

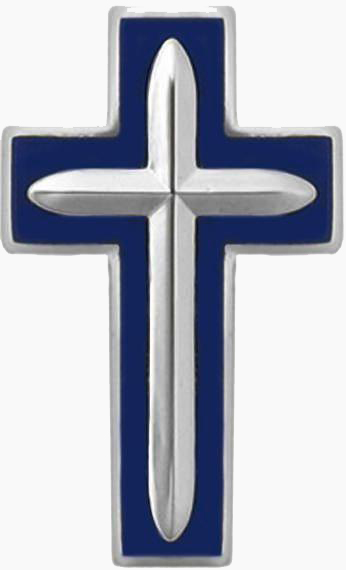

Jewish

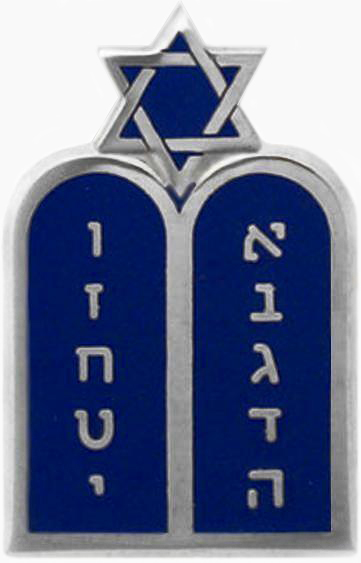

Muslim

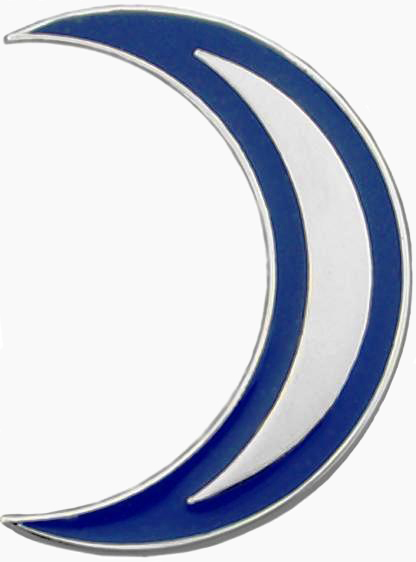

==== Ground Team ====
Ground Team Badge

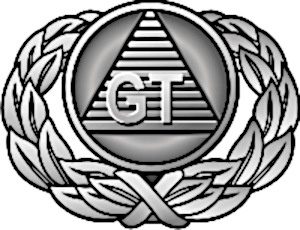

The Ground Team Badge is awarded to CAP members, seniors or cadets, who are qualified as a ground (i.e., search and rescue) team member. Once a badge is earned, the member may continue to wear it even if they no longer hold the associated qualifications unless directed by the wing, region, or national commander to remove it through a formal command action.

==== Incident Commander ====
- Incident Commander

==== Legal ====
- Legal Officer

==== Health Service Officer ====
- Physician (Includes: MD, DO, PA, Dentists, Doctorate Public Health)
- Nurse (RN, NP)
- Paramedic
- Advanced EMT
- EMT
- Health Services Officer (Technician, Senior, Master)

=== Specialty Badges ===
- Administration
- Aerospace Education
- Cadet Programs
- Character Development
- Communication
- Emergency Services
- Finance
- Historian
- Information Technology
- Inspector General
- Logistics
- Operations
- Personnel
- Professional Development
- Public Affairs
- Recruiting
- Safety

=== Service Badges ===
- Senior Advisory Group
- CAP Command Council
- National Executive Committee
- National Board
- National Staff
- Volunteer University Instructor

=== Command Pins ===
- Group Commander
- Squadron Commander

=== Cyber and STEM awards ===
- Cyber Badge (Basic, Intermediate, and Advanced)
- STEM Badge (Basic, Intermediate, and Advanced)

== Cords ==
Cords are used to indicate that a certain cadet has received a notable position in a CAP program.

=== Cadet Advisory Council ===
Kelly green cords are given to cadets currently serving as the primary representative for a Group CAC.

Red cords are given to cadets currently serving as the primary representative for a Wing CAC.

Blue cords are given to cadets currently serving as the primary representative for a Region CAC.

Gold cords are given to cadets currently serving as the primary representative for a National CAC.

=== Color Guard/Drill Team ===
White cords are given to cadets who are actively participating in a color guard event, or a National Cadet Competition team.

=== Honor Guard ===
Silver cords are given to cadets during an honor guard event, or if a cadet has graduated from an Honor Guard Academy.

=== Aide de Camp ===
The USAF Aide de Camp Shoulder Cord will be worn on the left sleeve by members (Senior and Cadet) serving as Aides de Camp to General Officers. The cord will only be worn when acting as an Aide de Camp and will be removed when not actively engaged in the duties of an Aide de Camp. The cord will only be worn on the Service uniform and Service Dress uniform.

== World War II awards ==
On 30 May 2014, a bill authorizing CAP Congressional Gold Medals was signed by President Barack Obama (Senate Bill S309 and House Bill HR 755). The bill awards a medal to the collective members of Civil Air Patrol who served during the period from 7 December 1941 to 2 September 1945, to both living members and to the families of deceased members.

These following ribbons were awarded to members for service as a member of Civil Air Patrol during World War II. Members who have earned them may continue to wear them, although they are no longer awarded.

=== Wartime Service Ribbon ===
Wartime service ribbon

The Wartime Service Ribbon is awarded to CAP members who served during World War II in any one of several capacities. The ribbon replaces several specific World War II ribbons, which are listed below.

=== Anti-Submarine Coastal Patrol Ribbon (obsolete) ===
Anti-submarine coastal patrol ribbon

The Anti-Submarine Coastal Patrol Ribbon was awarded to members who patrolled the Atlantic coast for enemy submarine attacks during World War II. This ribbon is no longer available, but is still worn by those who have earned it.

=== Southern Liaison Patrol Ribbon (obsolete) ===
Southern liaison patrol ribbon

The Southern Liaison Patrol Ribbon was awarded to members who patrolled the southern border of the United States. This ribbon is no longer available, but is still worn by those who earned it.

=== Tow-Target & Tracking Ribbon (obsolete) ===
Tow-target & tracking ribbon

The Tow-Target & Tracking Ribbon was awarded to members who flew aircraft which trailed aerial gunnery targets to assist with training of U.S. Army personnel. This ribbon is no longer available, but is still worn by those who earned it.

=== Courier Ribbon (obsolete) ===
Courier ribbon

The Courier Ribbon was awarded to members who transported time-sensitive messages, material, and personnel. This ribbon is no longer available, but is still worn by those who earned it.

=== Forest Patrol Ribbon (obsolete) ===
Forest patrol ribbon

The Forest Patrol ribbon was awarded to members who patrolled the Northern United States border from enemy attacks. This ribbon is no longer available, but is still worn by those who earned it.

=== Missing Aircraft Ribbon (obsolete) ===
Missing aircraft ribbon

The Missing Aircraft Ribbon was awarded to members who served as part of the search-and-rescue team for downed aircraft within United States borders. This ribbon is no longer available, but is still worn by those who earned it.

== See also ==
- Cadet grades and insignia of Civil Air Patrol
- Awards and decorations of the United States Armed Forces
- Military badges of the United States
