= Amy Courter =

American Civil Air Patrol commander (born 1961)

Amy S. Courter
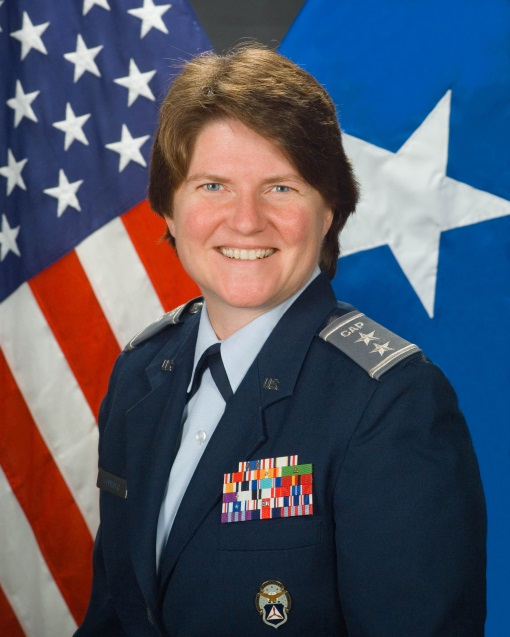
- Born: 1961 (age 64–65); Flint, Michigan
- Military career
- Allegiance: United States
- Branch: Civil Air Patrol
- Service years: 1979–Active
- Rank: Major General
- Commands: CAP National Commander; CAP Vice Commander; Michigan Wing Commander
- Awards: Distinguished Service Medal (3); Exceptional Service Award; Meritorious Service Award; Commander's Commendation Award; Crisis Service Award

Major General Amy S. Courter (born 1961) is the former National Commander of the Civil Air Patrol. She was elected by a unanimous decision of CAP's National Board on August 7, 2008.

== Education ==
Amy Courter graduated from Kalamazoo College in 1983 with a bachelor's degree in psychology and education, minoring in computer science and mathematics. She also earned secondary school teaching certifications in psychology, computer science and mathematics. Courter played basketball and field hockey as a Kalamazoo Hornet, and studied abroad in France at the Université de Strasbourg.

== Career ==
Courter served as Vice President of Information Technology and Telecom at Valassis, a marketing company in Michigan. Courter began as a mid-level manager at Valassis, accepting increasingly more strategic roles, overseeing all IT efforts globally for the last 14 of her 20 years there. Valassis is a publicly traded $2.3 billion company (NYSE:VCI). In 2005, she planned her departure from Valassis to enable her to work in other industries – notably health care and manufacturing.

== Civil Air Patrol ==
Courter joined Civil Air Patrol as a senior in high school. She served as Michigan Wing Commander from 1999 to 2002. She also served as the female senior advisor to CAP's National Cadet Advisory Council.

Courter has received the Garber, Loening, Yeager and Wilson awards; as well as the Distinguished Service Award with two clasps, National Commander’s Commendations and Exceptional Service, Meritorious Service and Commanders Commendation awards.

While serving as wing commander, Courter played a pivotal role in creating a new National Cadet Special Activity, the Civic Leadership Academy. This gives cadets an in depth view of the United States Government.

Courter was the first female member of CAP to attain the ranks of brigadier general and major general. In 2007, Courter became the Civil Air Patrol's acting National Commander. She was elected to a regular three-year term as National Commander in 2008. On August 7, 2008, during the 2008 Civil Air Patrol National Board and Annual Conference, Courter was elected to remain as Civil Air Patrol's National Commander. She was promoted two days later at the conclusion of the conference.
