= Edward D. Phelka =

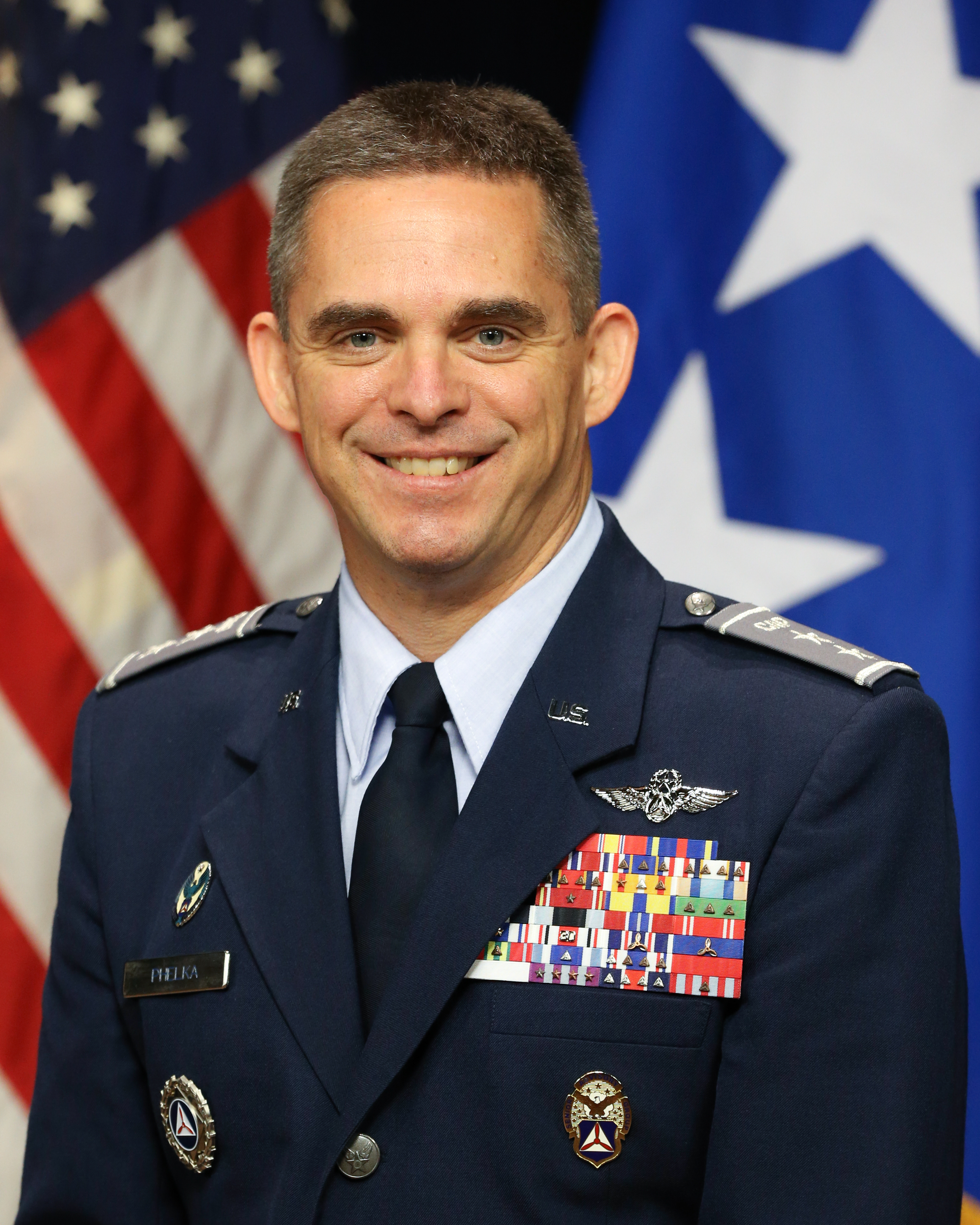

Edward D. Phelka is an American pilot who was the 25th Chief Executive Officer/National Commander of Civil Air Patrol. Phelka assumed command on August 26, 2021 in Detroit, Michigan. He served as CAP Chief Executive Officer and as an advisor to the CAP Board of Governors. He led the CAP Command Council and the CAP Senior Advisory Group (CSAG). Phelka joined CAP as a Michigan Wing cadet in 1987. He earned the General Carl A. Spaatz Award in 1993. Phelka was the second Spaatz recipient to reach the rank of national commander.

Phelka earned his pilot's license in 1998 and is a flight instructor, CAP mission pilot, cadet orientation pilot, and check pilot examiner. He earned a bachelor's degree from the University of Michigan at Ann Arbor, in economics and German. He has worked as a senior customer service representative and operations manager at Northwest Airlines and Frontier Airlines and in the software industry.

He and his wife have two children.
