= National Commander of the Civil Air Patrol =

Position in U.S. Air Force

National Commander of Civil Air Patrol
- Flag of the National Commander

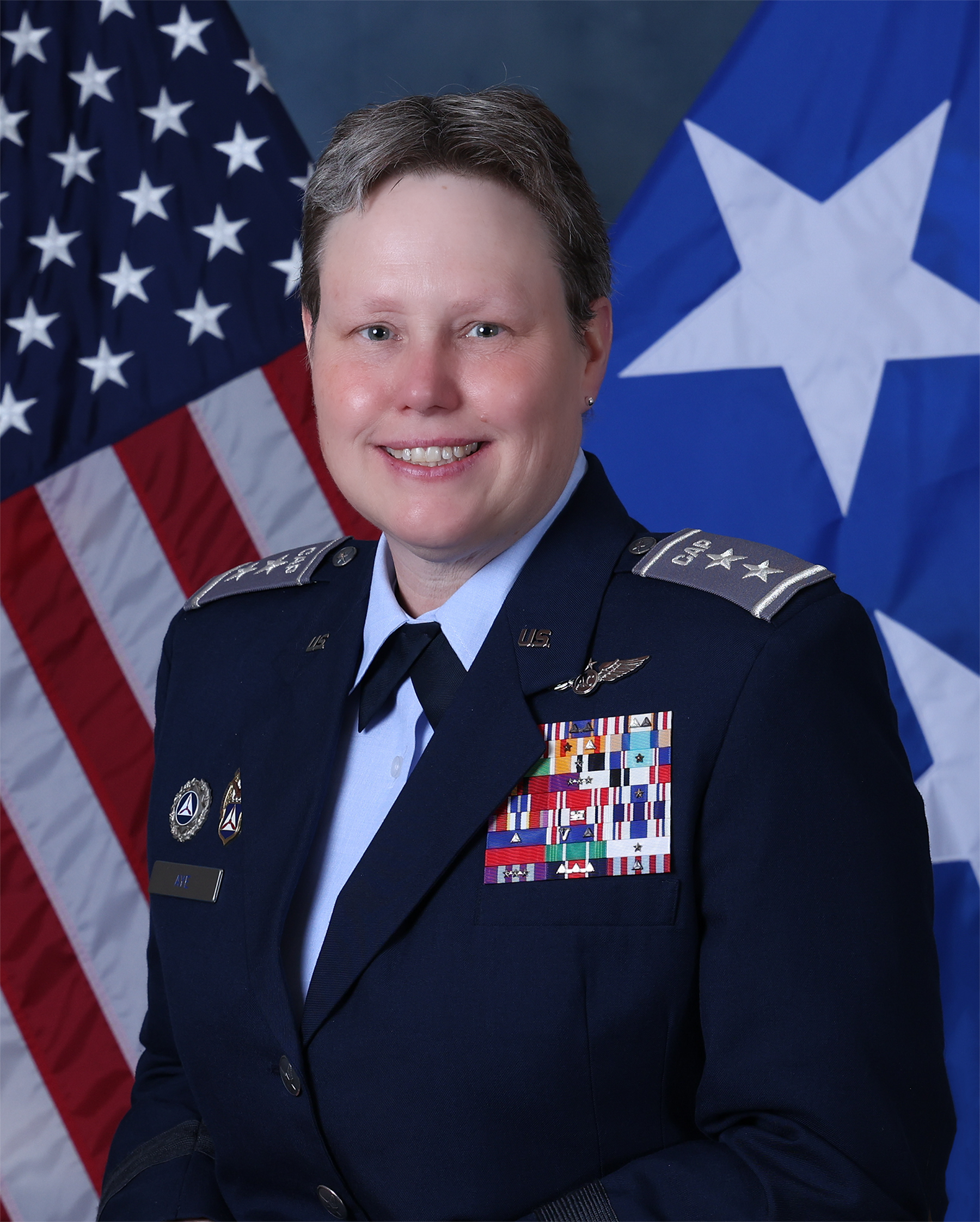
- Incumbent; Major General Regena M. Aye since 17 August 2024
- Civil Air Patrol
- Style: National Commander
- Status: Chief executive officer
- Abbreviation: CAP/CC
- Member of: CAP Command Council; CAP Senior Advisory Group
- Appointer: CAP Board of Governors
- Term length: Three years, can be extended
- Constituting instrument: CAP Constitution and Bylaws
- Formation: December 1, 1941; 84 years ago
- First holder: Maj Gen John F. Curry, USAAF
- Deputy: National Vice Commander of the Civil Air Patrol
- Website: www.gocivilairpatrol.com

The flag of a CAP brigadier general. It served as the flag of the national commander until 1 December 2002, when it became the flag of the national vice commander.

The National Commander of the Civil Air Patrol (acronym: CAP/CC) is the highest senior official and commanding officer of Civil Air Patrol (CAP) — a non-profit corporation that is congressionally chartered to operate as the civilian auxiliary of the United States Air Force. The National Commander also serves as the chief executive officer of CAP.

The National Commander works in close collaboration with Civil Air Patrol–U.S. Air Force (CAP-USAF), a U.S. Air Force command whose commander is responsible for overseeing CAP programs, liaison between the CAP and U.S. Air Force and other United States Government agencies, and ensuring U.S. Air Force and other U.S. Government support to CAP.

== History ==
From its creation on 1 December 1941 until 31 August 1975, the National Commander of CAP was an appointed active duty commissioned officer — typically a general officer — of the United States Army Air Forces (until September 1947) or the United States Air Force (after it became an independent service in September 1947). This National Commander was usually the sitting Civil Air Patrol-United States Air Force Commander.

Upon adoption of the CAP Constitution and Bylaws on 26 May 1948, the CAP was incorporated and officially became the civilian auxiliary of the U.S. Air Force and the CAP National Board was redesignated as the National Executive Board (NEB).

CAP Colonel George Andress Stone was the sitting CAP National Board Chairman, therefore became the Chairman of the NEB. Colonel Stone died in an aircraft accident while returning home from a NEB meeting in August 1948. Retired U.S. Air Force General Carl A. Spaatz assumed the position of Chairman about a week after Colonel Stone's death, and is widely regarded as the first Chairman. The board became the National Executive Committee (NEC) on 26 April 1960, with the position of Chairman continuing to serve as the head of CAP. The Chairman continued to answer to the National Commander, who was still the CAP-USAF Commander.

On 1 September 1975, the position of Chairman of the National Board was redesignated as National Commander, held by an active civilian CAP member with the CAP rank of brigadier general, with only sitting and former national commanders who served in the position on or after 1 September 1975 holding the CAP rank of brigadier general. The former U.S. Air Force-appointed National Commander position was redesignated as the Executive Director of the CAP. On 8 March 1995, during a reorganization of CAP National Headquarters, the title of Executive Director was changed to Senior Air Force Advisor.

On 1 December 2002, the National Commander position was elevated to the rank of major general, with the national vice commander becoming a brigadier general. Current and former national commanders who held the position after 1 December 2002 are the only CAP members who hold the CAP rank of major general. Former National Commanders who held the position prior to 1 December 2002 and sitting National Vice Commanders and those who held the position of National Vice Commander on or after 1 December 2002 are the only CAP members who hold the CAP rank of brigadier general.

Since 2008, the National Commander appoints a National Command Chief of the CAP to oversee the CAP NCO Corps as well as advise the National Commander on issues and policies relating to the NCO Corps.

Since 2012, the National Commander of the CAP also has served as the chief executive officer of the CAP Corporation. (Note: Change made upon adoption of the Constitution and Bylaws of the CAP Corporation made official on October 1, 2012.)

The current National Commander of the Civil Air Patrol is Major General Regena M. Aye.

== Civil Air Patrol-United States Air Force ==
Civil Air Patrol-United States Air Force (CAP-USAF) is the U.S. Air Force command responsible for ensuring the CAP is organized, trained, and equipped to fulfill Air Force-assigned missions. Operating alongside the CAP's civilian leadership, CAP-USAF provides day-to-day support, advice, and liaison to the CAP’s more than 60,000 members and provides oversight for CAP programs, with emphasis on safety and program requirements. CAP-USAF personnel are also the primary function interface between other federal agencies and the CAP.

CAP-USAF was established on 28 August 1948 under the U.S. Air Force Headquarters. CAP-USAF was transferred to Continental Air Command on 1 January 1959. Following Continental Air Command's inactivation in 1968, CAP-USAF was realigned back to U.S. Air Force Headquarters. On 1 July 1976, CAP-USAF was realigned under Air University. It would become aligned under Air University's Jeanne M. Holm Officer Accession and Citizen Development Center on 11 June 2009. On 16 June 2016, it would be realigned to the First Air Force under Air Combat Command, as part of an effort to better integrate CAP as a Total Force Member.

As of 2020, CAP-USAF was staffed with approximately 200 active-duty, United States Air Force Reserve, and civilian personnel at CAP National Headquarters at Maxwell-Gunter Air Force Base with locations in: New Jersey (Detachment 1, Joint Base McGuire-Dix-Lakehurst), Maryland (Detachment 2, Joint Base Andrews), Ohio (Detachment 3, Wright-Patterson Air Force Base), Georgia (Detachment 4, Dobbins Air Reserve Base), Minnesota (Detachment 5), Texas (Detachment 6), Colorado (Detachment 7, Peterson Space Force Base), California (Detachment 8, Beale Air Force Base), and Florida.

CAP-USAF currently runs a program known as the Civil Air Patrol Reserve Assistance Program (CAPRAP). This program is for Category E Reservists, those who participate for reserve "points" towards retirement but without pay, to act as a liaison between the Air Force and local CAP units. Individual Mobilization Augmentees and Traditional Reservists (two other reserve categories) are also eligible to participate in the program as a way to earn additional "points".

== List of officeholders ==
No.	Portrait	Name (birth–death)	Term of office		
No.	Portrait	Name (birth–death)	Took office	Left office	Time in office
U.S Army Air Forces / U.S. Air Force CAP National Commanders (1941-1948)
1		Maj Gen, USAAF; John F. Curry (1886–1973)	1 December 1941	10 March 1942	3 months
2		Brig Gen, USAAF (Note: Posthumously promoted from Col to Brig Gen following his death in 1947, effective date of rank: 3 Feb 1947); Earle L. Johnson (1895-1947)	10 March 1942	16 February 1947	4 years, 11 months
3		Brig Gen, USAAF; Frederic H. Smith Jr. (1908-1980)	16 February 1947	30 September 1947	1 year, 7 months
4		Maj Gen, USAF; Lucas V. Beau (1895-1986)	1 October 1947	26 May 1948	7 months
Chairman of the CAP National Executive Board (1948–1960)
5		Col; George A. Stone (1902-1948)	26 May 1948	20 August 1948	2 months
6		Gen, USAF (Ret); Carl A. Spaatz (1891-1974)	26 August 1948	27 April 1959	10 years, 8 months
7		Col; David H. Byrd (1900-1986)	28 April 1959	26 April 1960	11 months
Chairman of the CAP National Executive Committee (1960–1975)
8		Col; William C. Whelen	26 April 1960	8 September 1962	2 years, 4 months
9		Col; Paul W. Turner	8 September 1962	30 October 1965	3 years, 1 month
10		Brig Gen (Note: USAF approved the grade of Brigadier General, CAP, via order PANHQ 9, March 15, 1968); Lyle W. Castle (1922-2008)	30 October 1965	18 October 1968	2 years, 11 months
11		Brig Gen; Frank W. Reilly (Note: Some documents refer to him as "F. Ward Reilly")	18 October 1968	10 October 1970	1 year, 11 months
12		Brig Gen; Samuel H. du Pont Jr. (1936-2021)	10 October 1970	14 October 1973	3 years
13		Brig Gen; William M. Patterson	14 October 1973	18 September 1975	1 year, 11 months
CAP National Commander (1975–present)
13		Brig Gen; William M. Patterson	18 September 1975	19 September 1976	1 year
14		Brig Gen; Thomas C. Casaday (1918–2010)	19 September 1976	30 September 1979	3 years
15		Brig Gen; Johnnie Boyd (1927–2013)	30 September 1979	14 August 1982	2 years, 10 months
16		Brig Gen; Howard L. Brookfield (1929–2019)	14 August 1982	4 August 1984	1 year, 11 months
17		Brig Gen; William B. Cass (1934-2022)	4 August 1984	22 March 1986	1 year, 7 months
18		Maj Gen; Eugene E. Harwell (1930–2020)	22 March 1986	11 August 1990	4 years, 4 months
19		Brig Gen; Warren J. Barry (1922–2015)	11 August 1990	14 August 1993	3 years
20		Brig Gen; Richard L. Anderson	14 August 1993	10 August 1996	2 years, 11 months
21		Brig Gen; Paul M. Bergman (1940–2012)	10 August 1996	6 March 1998	1 year, 6 months
22		Brig Gen; James C. Bobick	6 March 1998	18 August 2001	3 years, 5 months
23		Maj Gen (Note: On December 1, 2002, the Air Force Chief of Staff, General John P. Jumper, announced that the position of National Commander of the Civil Air Patrol would be promoted from a Brig Gen to a Maj Gen. Subsequently, the Vice National Commander Position was promoted from a Col to a Brig Gen.); Richard L. Bowling	18 August 2001	21 August 2004	3 years
24		Maj Gen; Dwight H. Wheless (1940–2017)	21 August 2004	1 July 2005	10 months
25		Maj Gen; Antonio J. Pineda	1 July 2005	2 October 2007 (Note: On August 6, 2007, the Civil Air Patrol Board of Governors suspended the CAP national commander, Maj Gen Antonio J. Pineda, for a period of up to 180 days. Brig Gen Amy S. Courter, CAP national vice commander, assumed the duties of the National Commander during this period.)	2 years, 3 months
26		Maj Gen; Amy Courter	2 October 2007 (Note: On October 2, 2007, the Civil Air Patrol Board of Governors voted 9-1 to remove Antonio Pineda from his position as National Commander. He was removed from the CAP and stripped of his grade after NEWS OF THE FORCE, a military news e-zine based in Tampa, FL., first broke the story that Pineda had cheated on his Air Force Air Command and Staff College tests.)	7 August 2008	10 months
26		Maj Gen; Amy Courter	7 August 2008 (Note: Maj Gen Amy Courter was unanimously elected to the position of National Commander on August 7, 2008, during a live webcast.)	17 August 2011	3 years
27		Maj Gen; Charles L. Carr Jr.	17 August 2011	15 August 2014	2 years, 11 months
28		Maj Gen; Joseph Vazquez	15 August 2014	2 September 2017	3 years
29		Maj Gen; Mark E. Smith	2 September 2017	26 August 2021	3 years, 11 months
30		Maj Gen; Edward D. Phelka	26 August 2021	17 August 2024	3 years
31		Maj Gen; Regena M. Aye	17 August 2024	Incumbent	2 years, 70 days

== USAAF/CAP-USAF Commanders ==
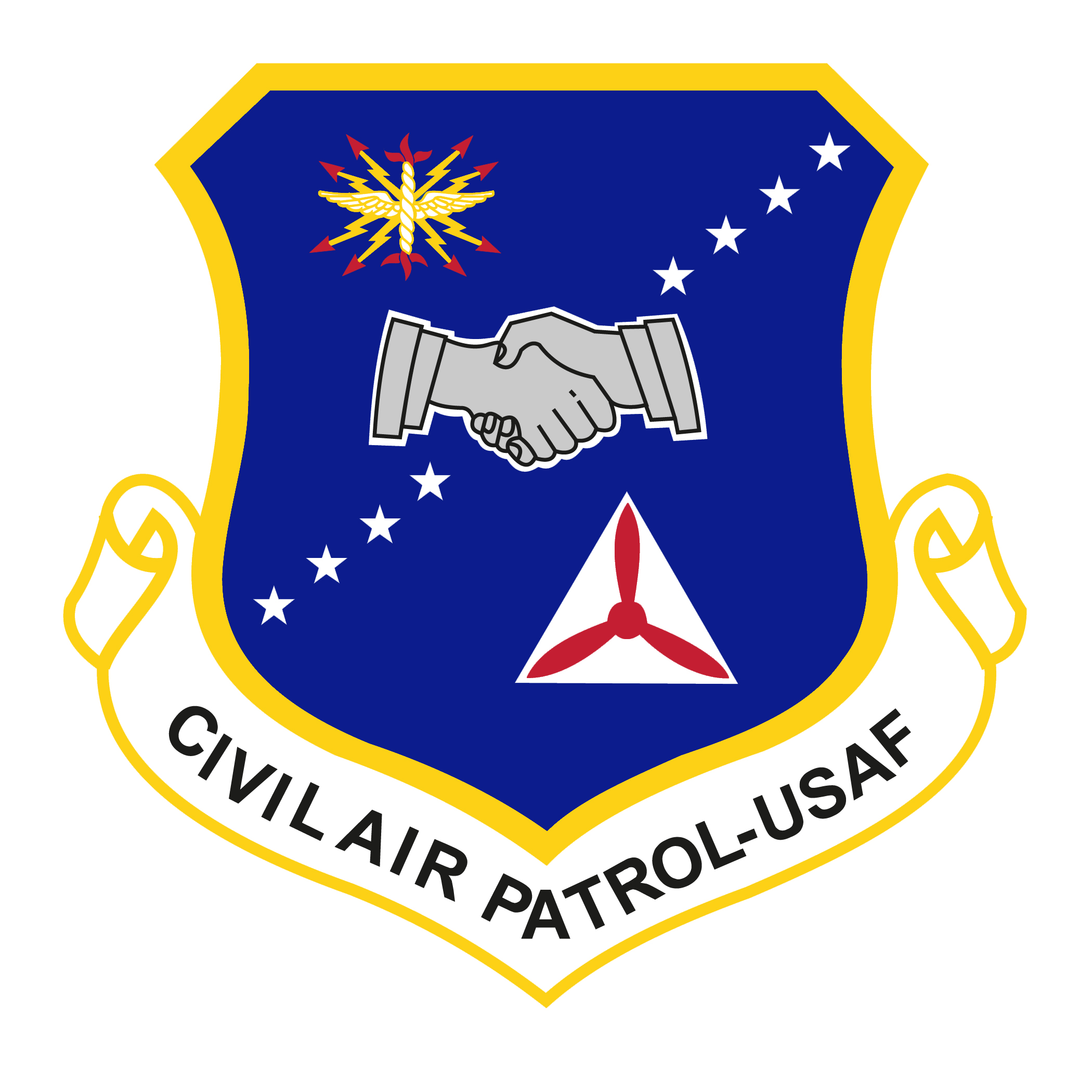
Civil Air Patrol-United States Air Force Emblem

U.S. Army Air Forces and U.S. Air Force National Commanders of the CAP prior to its 1948 incorporation are considered part of the lineage of the command history of CAP-USAF.

- Maj Gen John F. Curry, USAAF; Dec 1941 – Mar 1942
- Brig Gen Earle L. Johnson, USAAF; 10 March 1942 – 16 February 1947
- Brig Gen Frederic H. Smith Jr., USAAF; 16 February 1947 – 30 September 1947
- Maj Gen Lucas V. Beau, USAF; 1 October 1947 – 31 December 1955
- Maj Gen Walter R. Agee, USAF; 1 January 1956 – 31 March 1959
- Brig Gen Stephen D. McElroy, USAF; 1 April 1959 – 15 December 1961
- Col Paul C. Ashworth, USAF; 15 December 1961 – 31 July 1964
- Col Joe L. Mason, USAF; 1 August 1964 – 30 April 1967
- Brig Gen William W. Wilcox, USAF; 1 May 1967 – 31 October 1968
- Maj Gen Walter B. Putnam, USAF; 1 November 1968 – 31 October 1969
- Brig Gen Richard N. Ellis, USAF; 1 November 1969 – 31 October 1972
- Brig Gen Leslie J. Westberg, USAF; 1 November 1972 – 28 August 1975
- Brig Gen Carl S. Miller, USAF; 29 August 1975 – 31 October 1977
- Brig Gen Paul E. Gardner, USAF; 1 November 1977 – 31 July 1980
- Brig Gen Horace W. Miller, USAF; 1 August 1980 – 1 September 1981
- Brig Gen David L. Patton, USAF; 1 September 1981 – 31 May 1984
- Col John T. Massingale Jr., USAF; 1 June 1984 – October 1989
- Col Clyde O. Westbrook Jr., USAF; November 1989 – June 1990
- Col Joseph M. Nall, USAF; June 1990 – August 1992
- Col Ronald T. Sampson, USAF; August 1992 – 8 March 1995
- Col Garland W. Padgett Jr., USAF; 8 March 1995 – 4 May 1998
- Col Dennis B. Parkhurst, USAF; 4 May 1998 – 16 July 2001
- Col Albert A. Allenback, USAF; 16 July 2001 – 12 July 2002
- Col George C. Vogt, USAF; July 2002 – October 2005
- Col Russell D. Hodgkins Jr., USAF; October 2005 – April 2009
- Col William R. (Bill) Ward, USAF; April 2009 – 31 June 2011
- Col George H. Ross III, USAF; 1 July 2011 – 4 October 2011
- Col Paul D. Gloyd II, USAF; 4 October 2011 – May 2014
- Col Jay Updegraff, USAF; May 2014 – August 2014
- Col Michael D. Tyynismaa, USAF; August 2014 – 17 April 2019
- Col Mark A. Wootan, USAF; 17 April 2019 – 13 April 2022
- Col Tyler P. Frander, USAF; 13 April 2022 - August 2023
- Col Aaron D. Reid, USAF; Aug 2023 - 20 April 2026
- Col Andrew J. Stewart, USAF; 20 April 2026 - Present
