= New Mexico Department of Military Affairs =

New Mexico Department Of Military Affairs
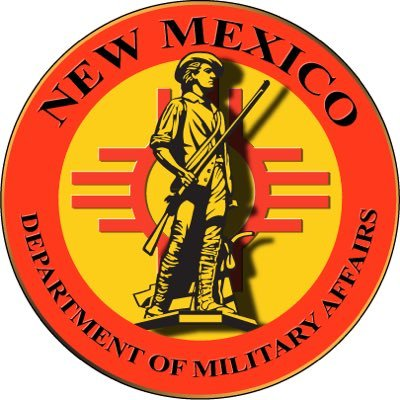

Agency overview
- Jurisdiction: New Mexico
- Headquarters: 47 Bataan Blvd; Santa Fe, New Mexico, 87508-4695
- Employees: 2,286 (Army National Guard); 1,005 (Air National Guard); 1,000 (Civil Air Patrol); 143 (Civilians); 25 (State Defense Force)
- Annual budget: $116,998,041.00 (49.4% Federal)
- Agency executive: BG Miguel Aguilar, Adjutant General, New Mexico Department of Military Affairs
- Child agency: New Mexico Army National Guard New Mexico Air National Guard New Mexico State Defense Force New Mexico Wing Civil Air Patrol
- Website: https://www.dma.state.nm.us

The New Mexico Department of Military Affairs (DMA) is a cabinet-level agency which provides infrastructure and administrative support to the New Mexico National Guard. The two branches of the New Mexico National Guard, the New Mexico Army National Guard and the New Mexico Air National Guard, in addition to the New Mexico State Defense Force and the New Mexico Wing Civil Air Patrol fall under the command of the state Adjutant General, an appointee of the Governor of New Mexico, and fall under the command of the Governor of New Mexico.

== New Mexico Army National Guard ==
The New Mexico Army National Guard has a dual federal and state mission. When in federal service, it acts as a reserve component of the United States Army. When activated by the state of New Mexico, the Army National Guard is tasked with emergency relief support during natural disasters such as floods, earthquakes and forest fires; search and rescue operations; support to civil defense authorities; maintenance of vital public services, and counterdrug operations.

== New Mexico Air National Guard ==
The New Mexico Air National Guard has a dual federal and state mission. When in federal service, it acts as a reserve component of the United States Air Force. Like the New Mexico Army National Guard, when activated by the state of New Mexico, the New Mexico Air National Guard may be deployed to support emergency services operations. In addition, the Air National Guard has complete responsibility for the air defense of the United States. The New Mexico Air National Guard is headquartered at Kirtland Air Force Base.

== New Mexico State Defense Force ==
The New Mexico State Defense Force is the state defense force of the state of New Mexico. The NMSDF is an all-volunteer, reserve military force which works in parallel to the state's National Guard. It is authorized by Title 32, Section 109, United States Code, NGB Reg. 10–4, Chapter 20, NMSA, 1978 Comp., the U.S. Constitution, and the New Mexico State Constitution.

== New Mexico Civil Air Patrol ==
The New Mexico Wing Civil Air Patrol (CAP) is the highest echelon of Civil Air Patrol in the state of New Mexico. Its headquarters is located at Kirtland Air Force Base.
