= Lost Boy Larry =

Purported missing child in New Mexico, U.S.

"Lost Boy Larry" search
- Search leaders conferring over maps of the Sandia–Manzano Mountains on August 9, 1973
- Date: August 7–12, 1973
- Duration: 5 days
- Location: Albuquerque, New Mexico, U.S.
- Type: Search and rescue operation
- Budget: US$25,000–120,000
- Organized by: New Mexico State Police; New Mexico Wing Civil Air Patrol; Albuquerque Citizens Radio Association; Radio Emergency Associated Communication Teams; Colorado State Patrol
- Participants: 200–250 ground and air searchers
- Outcome: Larry's signals declared hoax
- Property damage: $18,000 plane

"Lost Boy Larry" refers to a purported missing child in the U.S. state of New Mexico whose pleas for help were broadcast on citizens' band radio for several days in August 1973. The boy, who said his name was Larry, stated that he was stuck inside a truck that had crashed and turned over somewhere in the mountains of New Mexico and that his father, who had been driving, was killed in the accident. The boy's pleas were initially heard as far west as Long Beach, California, due to ionospheric skip. This incident was reported internationally at the time and prompted one of the biggest search and rescue missions in U.S. history up to that point. Several months after contact was lost with the boy, federal and state officials in New Mexico and Colorado declared the incident a hoax.

== Incident ==
=== First broadcast ===
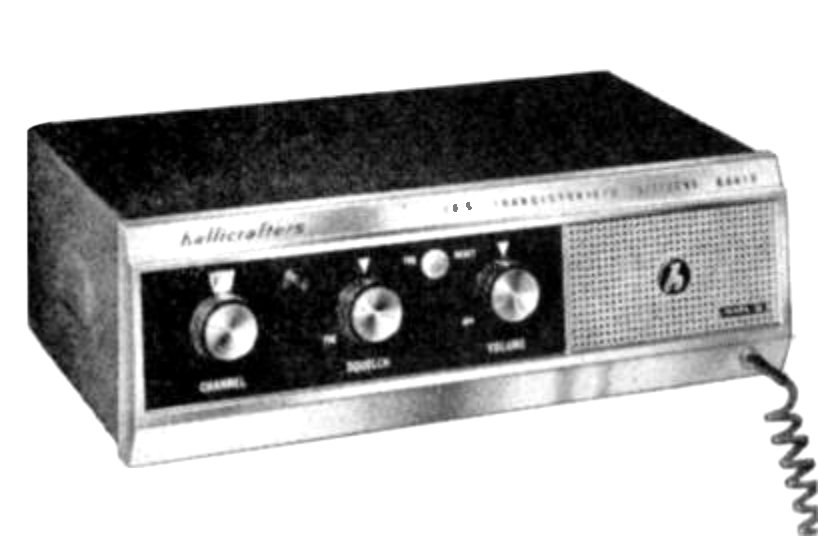
A battery-powered portable CB radio, such as that Larry was speculated to have used

The "Lost Boy Larry" signal was first reported at approximately 6:30 p.m. on Tuesday, August 7, 1973, by Darlene Ross of Fontana, California. Ross had been listening to her CB radio when she heard a young boy cry out, "Help! Please help me!" on her transceiver. Ross responded by asking for more information about the boy's situation while trying to calm him down. The boy responded that his father was dead; according to Ross, the boy also pleaded, "Come on, David, help me". Ross told the boy to stay in the air so that he could be located. The boy finally provided his name, Larry, and gave a location of New Mexico before his signal faded. Ross, a former Albuquerque resident, immediately called New Mexico authorities for help given the information Larry had purported. Later that night, Ross contacted the Albuquerque Journal, which broke the news of Larry's broadcast in the following morning's paper.

On Wednesday, August 8, multiple other accounts of Larry's distress broadcast became known to the Journal. These initial accounts came from California, as far west as Long Beach, by other CB radio enthusiasts, including one professional truck driver. While the signal strength of typical CB transceivers of the day prevented broadcasts from reaching far beyond the operator's state, the weather that week allowed ionospheric skip to propagate the signal through to the southwestern United States. Larry's signal additionally drifted between different CB channels while he made his pleas. The signal eventually reached as far east as Mississippi that day, and as far north as Canada shortly after that.

While reports of the "Larry" signal spread in the U.S., search teams in New Mexico prepared to launch a search and rescue mission. That same Wednesday, a CB enthusiast by the name of Linda King—alias "Blue Eyes"—was, with the assistance of several manned monitoring stations in New Mexico, able to coax Larry into providing more information about his status. In addition to saying that his father had died, Larry claimed that he was stuck inside the cab of an overturned pickup truck next to his father's body with no food or water and that he was six years old. He said that he had no knowledge of how to properly use the truck's CB radio, which could have explained his "walking" signal. Larry made these claims throughout the day on Wednesday, while King was on standby.

=== Search and rescue ===
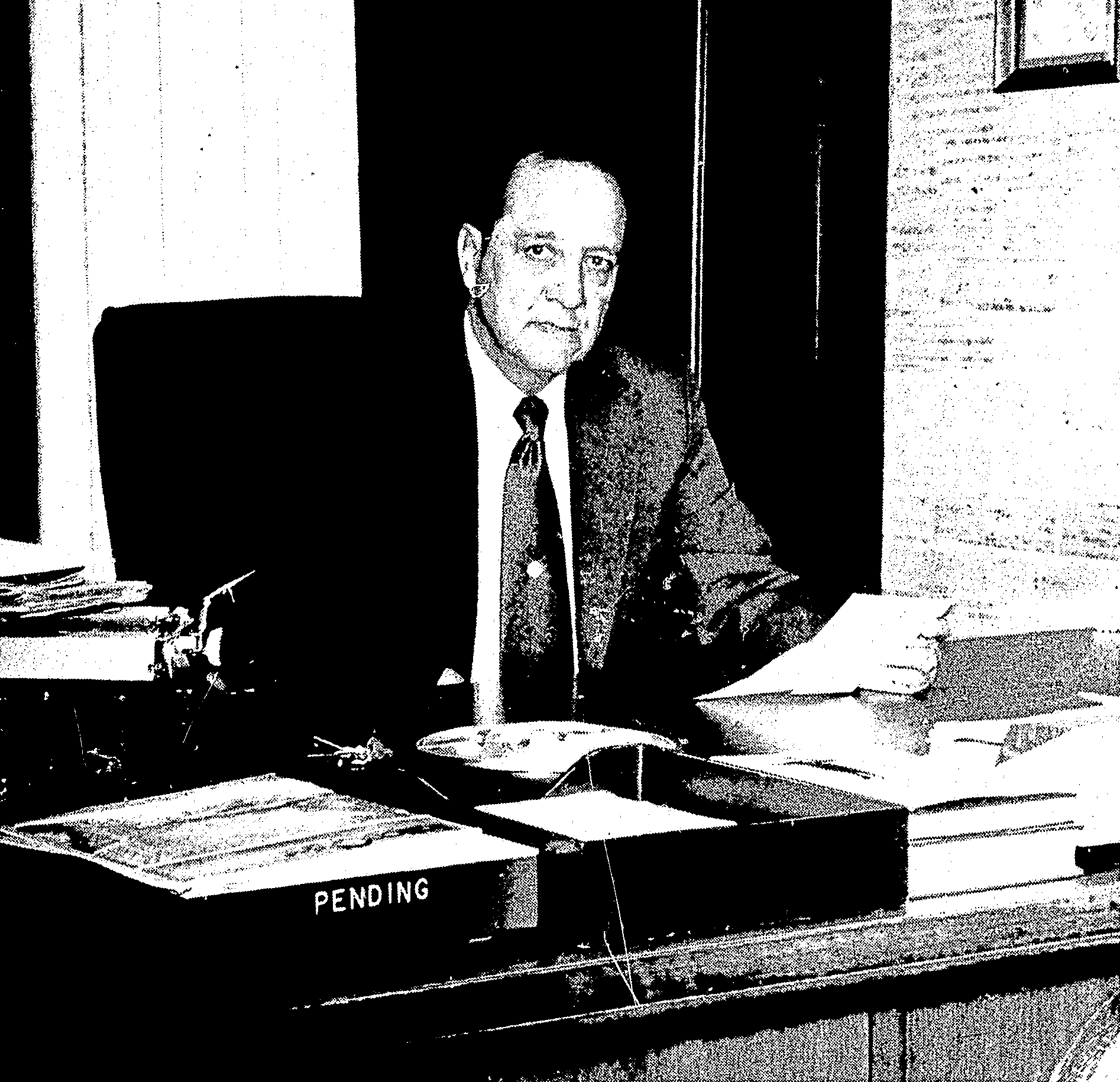
Chief Martin E. Vigil of the New Mexico State Police, pictured in 1974

Three separate groups in New Mexico—the New Mexico State Police (headed by Chief Martin E. Vigil), the New Mexico Wing Civil Air Patrol (a branch of the United States Air Force), and the Albuquerque Citizens Radio Association (ARCA)—began search and rescue operations in New Mexico by the middle of Wednesday morning. Clark Speakman of ARCA suggested that Larry was probably somewhere in the southern region of New Mexico after several locals in radio contact with Larry had given their testimony of their conversations. The Civil Air Patrol flew several planes over southern New Mexico and southeastern Arizona, equipped with radio direction finders, while the State Police and ARCA prepared to travel by foot in the foothills of the Sandia Mountains, southeast of Albuquerque. The State Police kept contact with Larry in the meantime. In Colorado, the next state over, the Denver chapter of Radio Emergency Associated Communication Teams (REACT) set up listening stations across Colorado to assist in the search for Larry. United Press International (UPI) picked up the story that day; speaking to a reporter, the State Police offered the possibility of the plea being a hoax, while Ross reported that Larry "apparently wasn't familiar with the area or with any of the towns he had been through ... crying almost incoherently."

Radio operators from communities within broader Albuquerque, including Moriarty and Cedar Crest, reported to the search teams that Larry's signal could have come from south of a cement factory in Tijeras Canyon. The ground and air searchers assembled there, assisted by Joe McKinney, the University Planner at the University of New Mexico who heard about the rescue operation over KOB radio. McKinney understood that helicopters would be necessary to navigate the Sandia–Manzano Mountains. However, the State Police were unable to furnish helicopters themselves due to the lack of a central coordinator role in the search operations division. McKinney, who had contact with the Navajo Nation Council chapter in Window Rock, Arizona, asked chairman Raymond Nakai for assistance, as McKinney remembered that the chapter owned two helicopters. With New Mexico governor Bruce King's encouragement by phone, Nakai obliged. King meanwhile contacted the New Mexico Army National Guard, who ordered two Iroquois helicopters and a U-21 aircraft, the latter flown by Captain Rick Tweed, a guard pilot. Tweed maintained contact with Larry from his cockpit's radio.

When the search teams arrived south of the concrete plant, however, only abandoned trucks and cars with nobody inside, discarded kitchen appliances, garbage, and water tanks turned up. Three Civil Air Patrol pilots sighted an abandoned truck east of the Manzano Mountains, and a helicopter was dispatched to the area, but this too proved fruitless. As dusk fell on Wednesday, Larry replied that it was raining at his location, after King asked him if he could still see the sun. The Fourth of July Canyon in the Manzano Mountains was experiencing rain at the time, prompting ARCA to search the area. Meanwhile, King asked Larry to yell into his microphone to see if he could spot the landing lights of a Piper Cherokee, manned by T. C. Ashby of the Las Cruces Civil Air Patrol, as it flew by the Manzanos. Larry yelled as Ashby flew over Chilili, but when searchers reached the area, no truck was found on the ground.

In all 150 persons equipped with directional finders and radio monitors scoured the foothills of central New Mexico by the end of Wednesday. Sargent W. A. Schmidt of the Civil Air Patrol reported that the search teams had still not discredited the possibility of the signal being a hoax. He opined: "I have never had any doubt that this is the real thing. I heard the kid crying. I just can't believe it isn't the real thing." Thursday, August 9, dawned especially hot in Albuquerque, the following hours reaching temperatures into the 90 degree Fahrenheit. Civilian men and women, both teenage and adult, from greater Albuquerque volunteered to search for Larry that Thursday.

The commotion of Thursday's search flooded the citizen's band with disparate voices calling for Larry, making it difficult for him and King to communicate with each other over the airwaves. The search was further marred by children using walkie-talkies to impersonate Larry. By this point very desperate, the search teams followed every lead, no matter how far-fetched. A church in Wichita, Kansas, which was holding an all-day prayer vigil for Larry, called the searchers to look for Larry beside a lake in Alamogordo, prompted by a "message". A psychic calling from a phone booth asked them to search twenty miles south of Moriarty. A woman from Maryland, who had gotten lost off a road in Sandia Park, asked the searchers that they look there. All three leads were followed to no avail. By the end of the day, critical phone lines within the State Police offices had gotten tied up with calls from as far east as New York concerning Larry, complicating matters further. Additionally, two separate families, one in Florida and one in Maryland, called the offices to report having relatives with sons named Larry traveling west with whom they had lost contact. Both sets of families were found intact shortly after. A radio operator purported that Larry had said that his last name was Cortesei, which excited friends of an Albuquerque veterinarian with the same last name who had gone on vacation with his family. However, they were later found staying in Minnesota.

Friday, August 10, was marked by confusion, as the search groups sorted through conflicting reports as to Larry's whereabouts and a weakening signal strength of Larry's broadcasts—suggesting that the portable CB radio of the truck was running out of batteries. Frank Loughlin, a paralyzed war veteran and CB "alert" operator from Phoenix, Arizona, stated that a boy named David had told him over the radio around noon that he was injured but now outside the overturned truck, which was a red pickup with a white camper in tow. "David" also claimed that his father was merely "hurt", leading the police to question if this David was the subject of Larry's earlier plea on Wednesday—perhaps his brother or a friend—and whether his father was dead or alive. Doubts increased over the legitimacy of further "Larry" transmissions, especially those in distant states, because of their larger number compared to detections within New Mexico, Larry's evasiveness, and the fact that the portable CB radio in the overturned truck likely only had enough battery life to run through Thursday.

The three search groups found themselves retreading covered ground while leaving some suspected areas untouched due to the lack of a sole controlling agency coordinating everything. Frustrated by this, the interference of unauthorized civilian volunteers, and the sneaking suspicion of Larry being a hoax, the groups grew weary of each other, with Colonel Richard Damerow, commander of the Civil Air Patrol, expressing his resentment at the groups' clashing in an interview with a newspaper. Chief Vigil attempted to re-coordinate the teams despite a lack of developed search procedures. He also pleaded with parents to confiscate their children's walkie-talkies and appealed to CB operators to keep Channel 14 clear, as that was the band Larry transmitted on the most often.

On that same Friday, a University of New Mexico student rented a US$18,000 plane to conduct his search for Larry. However, the plane flew out of control, and the student had to make a crash landing. He escaped without injury, but he had to pay $500 for his deductible on the plane's insurance. ARCA started a fundraiser to help the student, who spent his tuition money to pay off the deductible.

=== Signal lost ===
A KC-135 Stratotanker from Offutt Air Force Base outfitted with special radio direction finders, did a flyby of New Mexico to listen for Larry's signal across the citizen's band on Saturday, August 11. The aircraft was unable to home in on it due to CB being particularly busy that day. Another plane searched for the overturned truck through aerial infrared photography; one photograph suggested the shape of a truck on the ground, but this turned out to be another water tank. On Sunday, August 12, the State Police were able to rule out several of the later Larry transmissions as fraudsters, including the voice of "David", who turned out to be a boy in Phoenix playing on his walkie-talkie. Five days into the operation, the searchers had to accept the possibility of Larry having died from exposure or dehydration, should the initial broadcast have been a legitimate cry for help. With all leads exhausted, the search was called off Sunday night. Vigil explained to reporters that night that the three search teams had not "come up with any real definite information to establish that the situation is valid". "We have not come up with any information that is definite enough to say that there is someone out there and where this person might be", Vigil also said. Four directional finders were left operating in central New Mexico over the following weeks in case Larry broadcast again, allowing his location to be more easily pinpointed.

Larry Zmudzinski, a 12-year-old boy from Toledo, Ohio, who had gone missing along with his family in July 1973, was added to the list of possible leads to the identity of the Larry heard in New Mexico. A nationwide bulletin was issued on August 25, 1973, by Santa Fe Deputy Police Chief William J. Bullock. This Larry was the eldest child of the Lawrence Zmudzinski family. Lawrence's younger brother Louis informed Bullock by phone that the family had gone missing during a move from Ohio to Washington State and were last heard from on July 4. Larry Zmudzinski was crossed off the list of leads two days later, when he and his family were found alive and well at a campsite fourteen miles outside Wenatchee, Washington.

=== Purported second broadcast ===
On Saturday, August 24, 1973, CB operators in Colorado picked up the voice of a man who claimed to be behind the Larry signals. The operators heard the man boast about hoaxing the New Mexico State Police on the citizen's band. Just before midnight, after service station operator Robert Vetter of Denver intervened, the man made several death threats against Vetter, as well as against U.S. President Richard Nixon and U.S. Vice President Spiro Agnew. The man's transmission ceased by Sunday morning, preventing operators from tracing his location, but he started up again on a different channel that night.

The death threats were submitted to the Federal Bureau of Investigation (FBI), which subsequently passed them to the Federal Communications Commission (FCC) and the Secret Service for investigation. Vetter, who had heard the Larry signals earlier in the month, cast doubt on the man being responsible for those signals: "I don't think it was the same person ... The voice of the man that made the threat had a Mexican accent but the other one didn't. I'm not worried about it. We're getting all the nuts out of the woodwork now." Vetter believed that Saturday and Sunday's broadcast came from the Four Corners area, or possibly northern New Mexico or southern Colorado. Newsweek, which republished the story a week later, placed no doubt on the man being behind early August's Larry transmissions.

== Aftermath ==
In total, between 200 and 250 volunteers, law enforcement personnel, and National Guardsmen, as well as 22 planes, scoured the southwestern United States over five days in search of Larry. The hunt became one of the largest search and rescue missions in the history of the Southwest up to that date, involving hundreds of man-hours between civilian, military, and paramilitary organizations. It was also the most expensive search and rescue operation New Mexico had ever experienced, with a conservative estimate in 1983 totaling $25,000 (equivalent to $181,316 in 2025)—not including the crashed airplane—while a liberal estimate in 1973 put the total cost at $120,000 (equivalent to $870,315 in 2025). Colorado State Patrol officials and the office of the Arapahoe County Sheriff branded the incident a hoax in November 1973, though they could not confirm then that the search had been called off.

W. D. George, head engineer of FCC's Denver office, confirmed that no further signals from Larry had been heard since the search was called off in New Mexico on August 12. He opined: "As far as I know, it was a hoax. We don't have anything to the contrary". Vigil reaffirmed: "We have exhausted all efforts. I think we would have found [Larry] if he had been there because all the areas that were indicated were searched extensively." The Larry debacle was cited among other incidents of misuse occurring over citizens band radio in the early 1970s as the reason for the FCC's establishment of regional CB investigation teams in September 1974.

In 1974, UPI named "Lost Boy Larry" the fourth most important news report of New Mexico for 1973. The incident was later discussed in depth on an episode of the Science Channel series Phantom Signals, entitled "The Ghost on the Radio" (season 1, episode 5).

Several Albuquerqueans involved in the Larry rescue, among others, formed the New Mexico Search and Rescue Council (formerly the New Mexico Emergency Services Council) in 1974. Madge Harrah of Albuquerque Journal Magazine wrote of the search in 1983: "Larry was never found, but because of that search, numerous lives since have been saved. Search-and-rescue volunteers, when questioned about their dedication, say that saving a life is what makes all the long, hard hours of training worthwhile."
