= New Mexico National Guard =

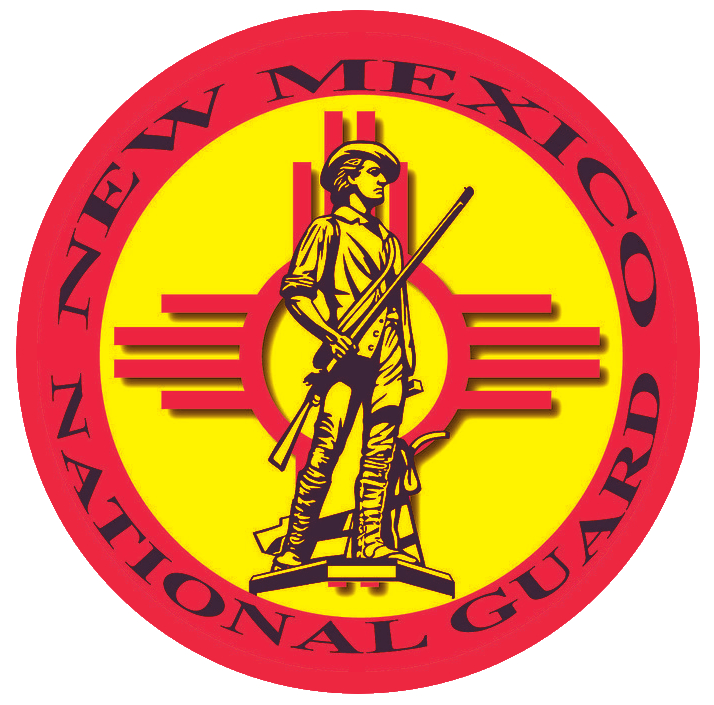
- Logo
- Founded: April 30, 1598; 428 years ago
- Country: United States
- Allegiance: New Mexico
- Branch: United States Army; United States Air Force
- Type: National Guard
- Role: Federal Reserve Force; Organized State Militia
- Size: 3,921
- Part of: U.S. National Guard
- Engagements: Santa Fe de Nuevo México: Pueblo Revolt; Chimayó Rebellion; Mexican–American War/Taos Revolt: Battle of El Brazito; Battle of Cañada; First Battle of Mora; Second Battle of Mora; Siege of Pueblo de Taos; Red River Canyon Affair; Cienega Affair; American Civil War/New Mexico Campaign: Battle of Valverde; Battle of Glorieta Pass; Battle of Albuquerque; Battle of Peralta; Navajo Wars: Battle of Pecos River; Apache Wars: Battle of Mount Gray; Skirmish in Doubtful Canyon; Spanish–American War: Battle of Las Guasimas; Battle of San Juan Hill; Siege of Santiago; World War I World War II: Bataan Death March; Manhattan Project; Project Y; Trinity (nuclear test); Navajo Code Talkers; Korean War; War in Afghanistan; Iraq War

Commanders
- Commander in Chief (Title 10 USC): President of the United States (when federalized)
- Commander in Chief (Title 32 USC): Governor of New Mexico
- Adjutant General: Major General Miguel Aguilar

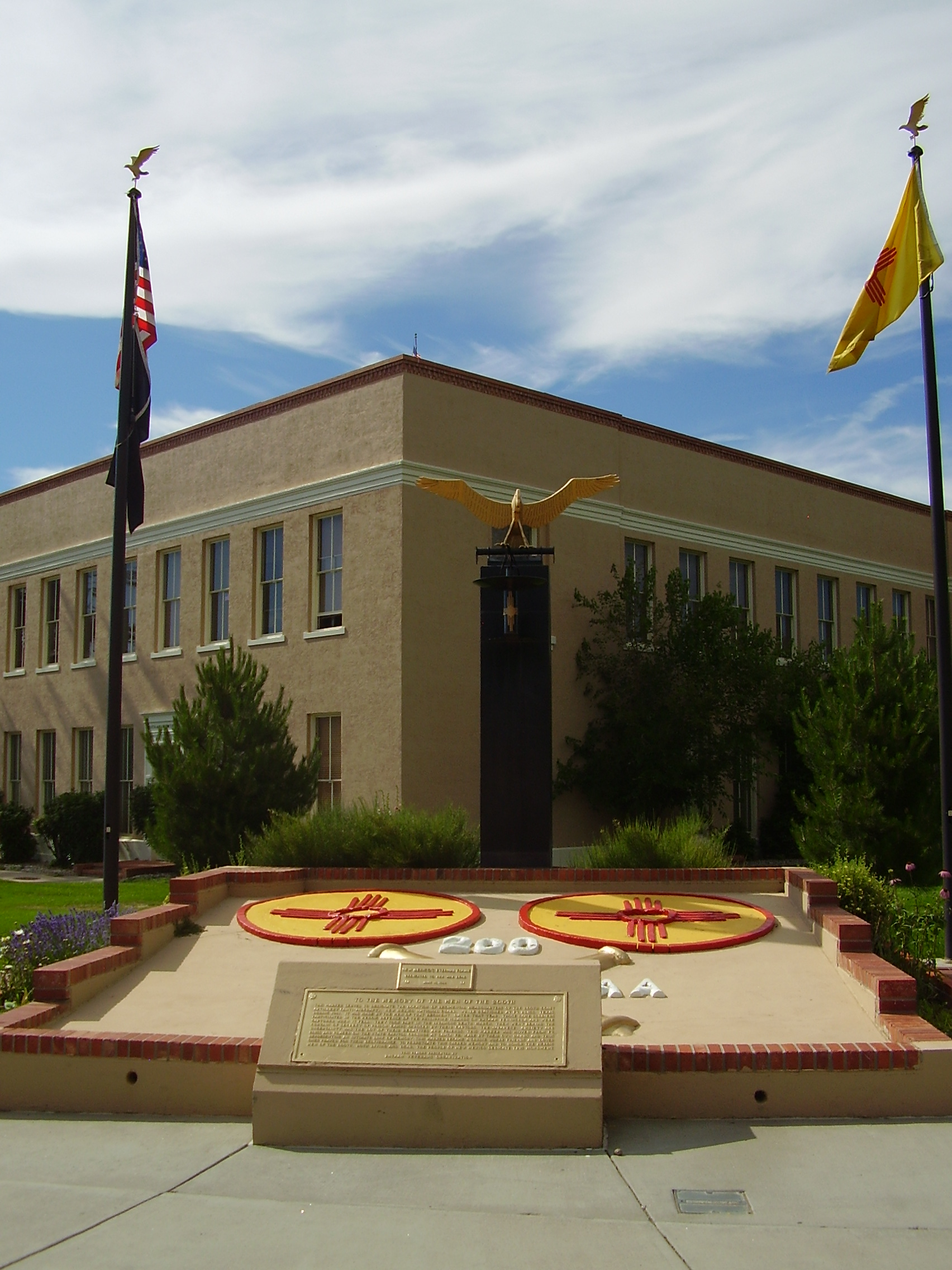
Memorial to the 200th Coast Artillery of the New Mexico National Guard

The New Mexico National Guard is the militia of the U.S. state of New Mexico. Comprising the New Mexico Army National Guard and the New Mexico Air National Guard, it is part of the National Guard of the United States, a reserve force under both state and federal jurisdiction.

The New Mexico National Guard traces its history to sixteenth century colonial militias of Spanish Nuevo México. Reflecting this unique heritage, its military band is known for performing New Mexico music and having the first and only official mariachi band in the U.S. Armed Forces. Elements of the New Mexico National Guard have participated in almost every major U.S. conflict, from the American Civil War to the war on terror; it is most notable for its involvement in the opening stages of the U.S. war with Japan during World War II.

New Mexico National Guardsmen are eligible for all awards and decorations of the United States Armed Forces as well as those exclusive to New Mexico. Soldiers and airmen are trained and equipped as part of the U.S. Army and Air Force and utilize identical ranks and insignias; although they serve part time, Guardsmen are held to the same standards of discipline, physical fitness, and marksmanship as their active duty counterparts.

The New Mexico National Guard is under the jurisdiction of the governor of New Mexico through the office of the New Mexico Adjutant General; all individuals or units may be called into "state active duty" during emergencies or special situations. Under the U.S. Constitution and federal law, Guardsmen may be activated for federal service by Congress, with the President of the United States serving as commander in chief.

== History ==
On April 30, 1598, Spanish conquistador Juan de Oñate led a colonial expedition across the Río del Norte (Río Grande) near present-day Ciudad Juárez, Mexico. There were no regular Spanish soldiers with the expedition, and none were assigned to the new colony of Nuevo México during the seventeenth century, through the Pueblo Rebellion of 1680. The military requirements of the colony were undertaken by the colonists themselves in their dual roles of soldier-colonist.

By the early eighteenth century the population of Nuevo Mexico had grown, and settlements proliferated. In each settlement, one of their numbers was designated Maese or Maestre de Campo ("field marshal"), who served as the local leader or commander of the citizen-soldiers (vecinos, inhabitants) in his jurisdiction. The Meastre de Campo responded to a call to arms by the governor with as many citizen-soldiers as he could muster locally. Each member of this militia provided his own arms and mount for the common defense.

This militia system prevailed until 1846, when General Stephen W. Kearny occupied New Mexico. The first Territorial Militia was provided for by a system of laws devised by Kearny, commonly known as the Kearny Code. Then in 1851 the first territorial Legislature created the office of Adjutant General and placed the territorial Militia under its jurisdiction.

In 1862, the Territorial Militia, also known as the New Mexico Volunteers, played a decisive role in the defeat of Confederate forces in the Battle of Glorieta. During 1863 and 1864, the Militia was also active in Navajo and other Indian campaigns of the period.

In 1898, the war with Spain called for the organization of volunteer forces, which achieved fame as Teddy Roosevelt's "Rough Riders." Many New Mexico Guardsmen helped form the 2nd Squadron, 1st United States Cavalry, which served with Roosevelt at the legendary charge of San Juan Hill.

After the war with Spain, units of the New Mexico National Guard were again placed in active service on the Mexican border to pursue Pancho Villa after Mexican forces raided Columbus, New Mexico, in 1916. The Guard spent one year on this border duty, hardening themselves to the rough field conditions of the desert southwest.

Mobilization for World War I found the New Mexico National Guard ready for the upcoming struggle. Upon activation into Federal Service, the First Regiment of Infantry was assigned to the 40th Infantry Division in France. A Battery of Field Artillery was assigned to the 41st Division and became part of the 146th Field Artillery Regiment. This unit took part in the actions at Champagne-Marne, Alsne-Marne, and Meuse-Argonne.

In 1921, the Guard was reorganized into the 111th Cavalry Regiment, the 120th Engineers, and Battery A, 158th Field Artillery. In 1939, the War Department suggested the 111th Cavalry convert to another branch of service and the officers of the command jointly selected Coast Artillery. In 1940, the 111th was re-designated the 200th Coast Artillery and the 158th was reorganized as the 104th Anti-Tank Battalion. On January 6, 1940, these units, along with the 120th Engineer Regiment, were called to active duty for what was supposed to be a one-year training period.

In August 1941, the 200th Coast Artillery was given notice that it had been selected for an overseas assignment of great importance. At about 0300 hours on December 8, 1941, the 200th went on full alert when the night radio crew picked up commercial broadcasts telling of the Japanese attack at Pearl Harbor, Hawaii. At 1235 hours, on December 8, Japanese bombers, accompanied by strafing planes, made their appearance over the Philippine Islands and the war was on for the 200th.

The 200th assumed the mission of covering the retreat of the Northern Luzon force into Bataan, while the Provisional Manila Group newly christened on December 19, 1941, and the 515th Coast Artillery assumed a similar mission for the South Luzon force. These units distinguished themselves during this action and during the defense of Bataan.

Of the 1,800 New Mexico men sent to the Philippines, 900 survived the Battle for Bataan, "death march" and the 40 months spent in prisoner of war camps. The 200th and its "child" the 515th, better known as "the Brigade," brought home three distinguished unit citations and the Philippine Presidential Unit Citation.

The 120th engineers (Less 1st Bn.) was inducted into Federal Service on September 16, 1940, and immediately departed for Fort Sill, Oklahoma, for the start of intensive engineer training preparing for the upcoming assault on Europe. When the 45th Division moved into Sicily, the attached 120th was there. With the 45th Division constantly on the move, the 120th also served in Rome, Southern France and throughout the Rhineland.

In another sector of the Italian campaign, the 804th Tank Destroyer Battalion, formerly the 104th Anti-tank Battalion, was helping to write the pages of war history in support of the 34th "red Bull" division. While in action, men of the Battalion were awarded eight Silver Star medals, three Legion of Merits and sixty bronze stars. One hundred and thirty-five were awarded purple hearts; thirty of these were awarded posthumously. Campaign credits earned were for Rome - Arno, North Apennines, and Po Valley. Their decorations are as follows: Streamer in the colors of the French Croix de Guerre with Palm embroidery Central Italy.

The War Department directed the reorganization of the Guard in March 1947. This order gave the State five separate Anti-Aircraft Battalions, one Operations Detachment, two Signal Radar Units, one Engineer Searchlight Maintenance Unit, three Ordnance Companies, one Transportation Truck Company and one Army Band. Also, in this same time the Guard was allotted a Fighter-Bomber Squadron for its Air National Guard. This organization listed above remained static until August 1950.

The Korean War caused activation into Federal service of the 716th AAA Gun Battalion along with the 726th and 394th Signal Radar Maintenance Unit. The 188th was also activated during the conflict. New Mexico units furnished individual members as replacements to units engaged in active combat. No entire unit saw action in the hills of Korea.

During the buildup of the Army caused by the Berlin crisis in 1961, the 394th Signal Detachment was ordered into Federal service on October 1, 1961. This unit was assigned to Tobyhana Signal Depot in Pennsylvania until August 1962. On July 1, 1961, the 188th Fighter Interceptor Squadron assumed 24-hour Air Defense alert status at Kirtland Air Force Base.

The Vietnam War caused a beef-up in the Guard's manpower and equipment. Although no Army National Guard units were activated for Federal service, many guardsmen did volunteer for duty. On June 4, 1968, 22 F-100 fighter aircraft, accompanied by 360 personnel departed Kirtland AFB for a new home station at Tuy Hoa Air Base, South Vietnam. Two hundred eighty personnel, the remainder of the 150th Tactical Fighter Group, departed to Korea to augment regular Air Force personnel at Taegu AFB, Osan AFB, Kunsan AFB and Suwan AFB. Others were sent to Japan and to stateside air bases. One hundred members of the unit remained in New Mexico. During May and June 1969 all Air Guard personnel were deactivated and returned to State control.

In 1967, the Army Guard was ordered to State duty by the Governor to assist local and State law enforcement officials following a raid on the Rio Arriba County Courthouse in Tierra Amarilla. Following the Kent State shootings in May 1970, Army and Air Guard units were ordered to State duty to assist local and State police during campus unrest at the University of New Mexico. On May 8, guardsmen bayoneted eleven people and were subsequently withdrawn from university grounds.

The riot at the State Penitentiary in Santa Fe during February 1980 will be remembered as one of the worst in history. Guard personnel and many law enforcement officers were on duty throughout the thirty-six-hour siege during which the penitentiary was burned and thirty-three inmates were killed and many injured. This same year the 150th Tactical Fighter Group won the Winston P. Wilson Trophy for being the best Fighter Unit in the Air National Guard.

During the 1983-1989 time frame the New Mexico Army National Guard began a complete modernization program to gain high technology type units. The 5th Battalion (Roland) was fielded at McGregor range. This unit was disbanded in September 1988, due to Federal budget cuts. A complete conversion of Duster Battalions to the Chaparral Battalions was accomplished. A new HAWK Missile Battalion is now in place at Rio Rancho, New Mexico.

In November 1990, four units of the Guard were federalized into active duty in support of Operation Desert Shield later to be called Desert Storm: 720th Heavy Truck Transportation Company, Las Vegas, 812th Medical Detachment, Santa Fe, 150th Security Police flight, Albuquerque, and the Air Defense Training Activity, Ft. Bliss, Texas. The New Mexico Air National Guard was notified in April 1991 that they would be converting to new F-16 fighter aircraft during fiscal year 1992.

Since 2006, New Mexico has been conducting join training and information training with Costa Rica through the State Partnership Program.

== Components ==
Major units of the New Mexico Army National Guard include the 226th Military Police Battalion, 1st and 2nd Battalions, 200th Infantry Regiment, the 93rd Troop Command, 44th Army Band, the 111th Sustainment Brigade, and the 717th Brigade Support Battalion. The major unit of the New Mexico Air National Guard is the 150th Special Operations Wing.

In addition, the New Mexico State Defense Force (NMSG) is an all-volunteer militia force under the New Mexico Military Department that provides reserve personnel to both the New Mexico Army National Guard and the New Mexico Air National Guard. It is under state jurisdiction and its members are employed only within the State of New Mexico. It is not subject to be called, ordered or assigned as any element of the federal armed forces. Its mission is to provide units organized, equipped and trained in the protection of life or property and the preservation of peace, order and public safety under competent orders of State authorities.
