= New Mexico Air National Guard =

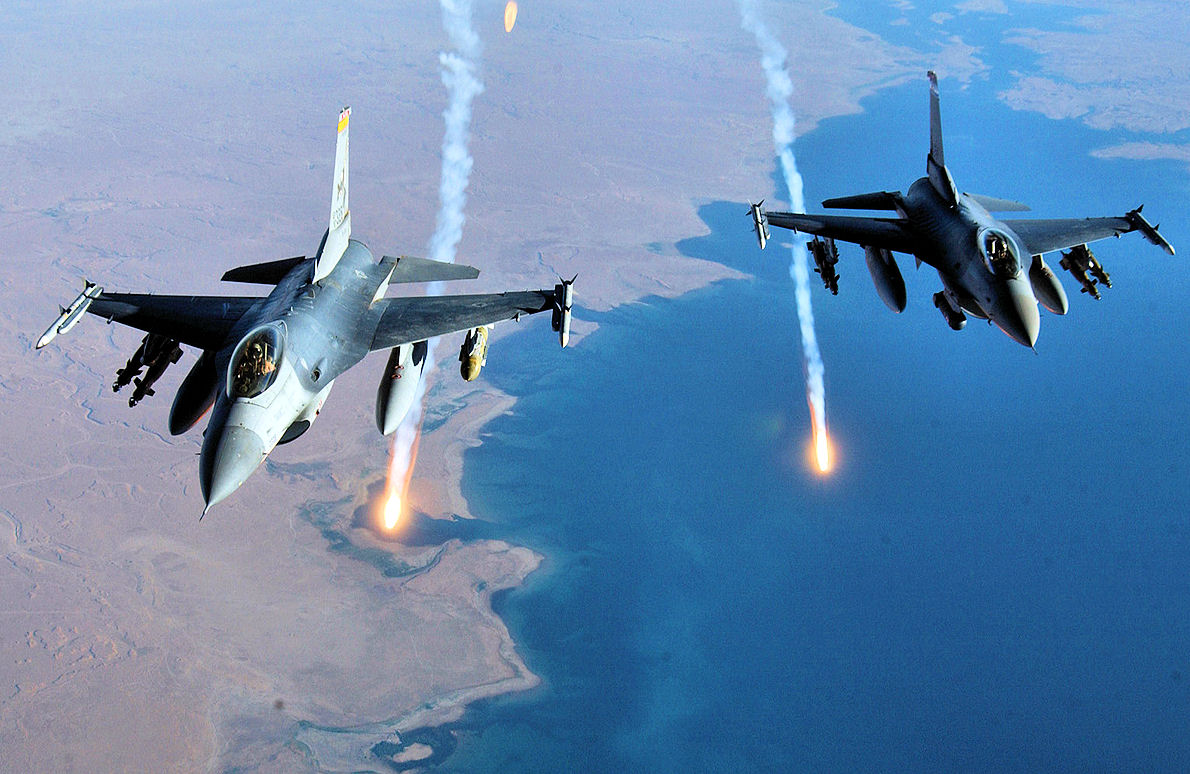
- F-16 Fighting Falcons of the 188th Expeditionary Fighter Squadron over Iraq, 2009
- Active: 7 July 1947 - present
- Country: United States
- Allegiance: United States; New Mexico
- Branch: Air National Guard
- Type: State militia, military reserve force
- Role: "To meet state and federal mission responsibilities."
- Size: 1,005
- Part of: New Mexico National Guard; United States National Guard Bureau
- Garrison/HQ: New Mexico Department of Military Affairs, 2251 Air Guard Drive Southeast, Albuquerque, New Mexico, 87117
- Engagements: Korean War; Operation Desert Storm; Global war on terrorism

Commanders
- Civilian leadership: President Donald Trump (Commander-in-Chief); Troy Meink (Secretary of the Air Force); Governor Michelle Lujan Grisham (Governor of the State of New Mexico)
- State military leadership: Major General (NM) Miguel Aguilar (Adjutant General of the State of New Mexico)

Insignia
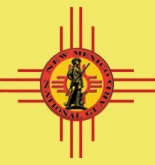
- Emblem of the New Mexico Air National Guard

The New Mexico Air National Guard (NM ANG) is the aerial militia of the State of New Mexico, United States of America. It is a reserve of the United States Air Force and along with the New Mexico Army National Guard an element of the New Mexico National Guard of much larger United States National Guard Bureau.

As state militia units, the units in the New Mexico Air National Guard are not in the normal United States Air Force chain of command. They are under the jurisdiction of the governor of New Mexico though the office of the New Mexico Adjutant General unless they are federalized by order of the president of the United States. The Adjutant General is MG (NM) Miguel Aguilar. The New Mexico Air National Guard is headquartered in Albuquerque at Kirtland Air Force Base, and its interim-commander is currently Colonel Christopher N. George.

== Overview ==
Under the "Total Force" concept, New Mexico Air National Guard units are considered to be Air Reserve Components (ARC) of the United States Air Force (USAF). New Mexico ANG units are trained and equipped by the Air Force and are operationally gained by a major command of the USAF if federalized. In addition, the New Mexico Air National Guard forces are assigned to Air Expeditionary Forces and are subject to deployment tasking orders along with their active duty and Air Force Reserve counterparts in their assigned cycle deployment window.

Along with their federal reserve obligations, as state militia units the elements of the New Mexico ANG are subject to being activated by order of the governor to provide protection of life and property, and preserve peace, order and public safety. State missions include disaster relief in times of earthquakes, hurricanes, floods and forest fires, search and rescue, protection of vital public services, and support to civil defense.

== Components ==
The New Mexico Air National Guard consists of the following major unit:

- 150th Special Operations Wing (formerly 150th Fighter Wing)

Established 7 July 1947 (as: 188th Fighter Squadron)
Stationed at: Kirtland Air Force Base, Albuquerque
Gained by: Air Force Special Operations Command
The 150 SOW is currently engaged in assuming part of the mission of the USAF 58th Special Operations Wing at Kirtland AFB. The future mission of the 150 FW will be to train aircrew in the HC-130P and HH-60G search and rescue aircraft, and the MC-130E Combat Talon I, MC-130P Combat Shadow, and CV-22 Osprey special operations aircraft.

The New Mexico Air National Guard owns and uses the Cato/Smitty MOA, southwest of Albuquerque, from 500 feet AGL to 51,000 feet with some supersonic flights conducted above 30,000 feet. The unit also utilizes the very large White Sands Missile Range (WSMR) airspace for both air-to-air and air-to-ground training. In addition to Cato and WSMR, the Tacos make use of the Pecos MOA that is east of Albuquerque and North of Roswell. For air-to-ground training, the NMANG has several options for local flying, including Melrose Bombing Range co-located with the Pecos MOA, Red Rio, Oscura, and Centennial ranges in the WSMR airspace, and Airburst bombing range in southern Colorado.

The 150th Fighter Wing scheduled three Military Training Routes (MTR) that are wider than average to help dissipate the environmental effects of overflight. They usually get very few noise complaints. VR-176 is an MTR that accesses the White Sands Missile Range airspace and even though it is very wide, has the most noise avoidance areas. Every attempt is made to brief infrequent or transient users of VR-176 about the noise sensitive areas. VR 1195 and 1107 encompass the majority of eastern New Mexico.

New Mexico has some of the most optimal flying conditions in the country, three large supersonic training areas, five air-to-ground ranges (three manned, all scoreable), and three very large Military Training Routes.

== History ==
On 24 May 1946, the United States Army Air Forces, in response to dramatic postwar military budget cuts imposed by President Harry S. Truman, allocated inactive unit designations to the National Guard Bureau for the formation of an Air Force National Guard. These unit designations were allotted and transferred to various State National Guard bureaus to provide them unit designations to re-establish them as Air National Guard units.

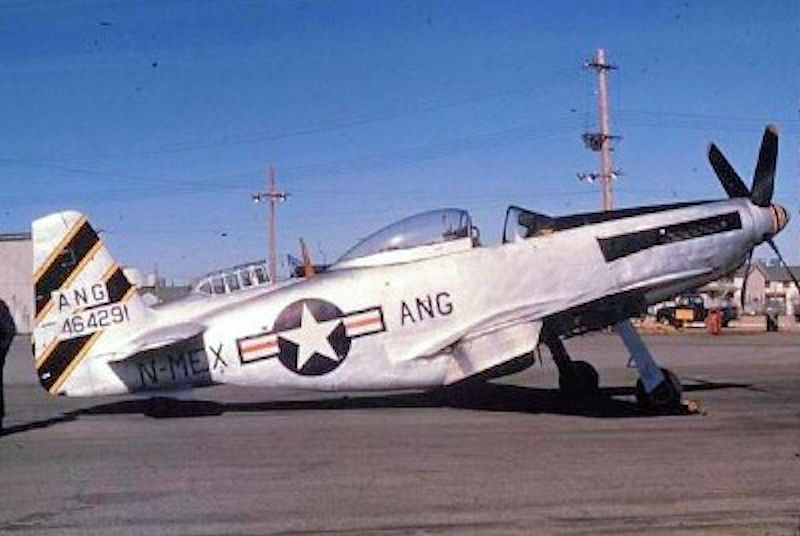
An F-51H Mustang of the 188th Fighter Squadron, 1948

The New Mexico Air National Guard was federally recognized on 7 July 1947 as the 188th Fighter Bomber Squadron. The unit was composed of a utility flight equipped with Douglas B-26 light bombers, a fighter squadron composed of 100 officers and airmen flying 25 F-51D Mustangs and three T-6 Texan trainers, plus a small weather detachment. Pilots were drawn from returning World War II veterans, including David Tallichet, and new local recruits.

18 September 1947, however, is considered the New Mexico Air National Guard's official birth concurrent with the establishment of the United States Air Force as a separate branch of the United States military under the National Security Act. The 188th's mission was changed from fighter bomber to interceptor in 1948.

=== Korean War ===
In December 1950, the unit was called to active duty for the Korean War. A total of 54 officers and 400 airmen were assigned to Long Beach Airport, California. Most unit members were then absorbed by other USAF units and dispatched to Japan and Korea. First Lieutenants Robert Lucas and Joseph Murray were killed while flying close air support missions in Korea. Captain Francis Williams and First Lieutenant Robert Sands were each credited with shooting down three Mikoyan-Gurevich MiG-15 fighters. The unit was released from federal active duty in November 1952.

=== Cold War ===
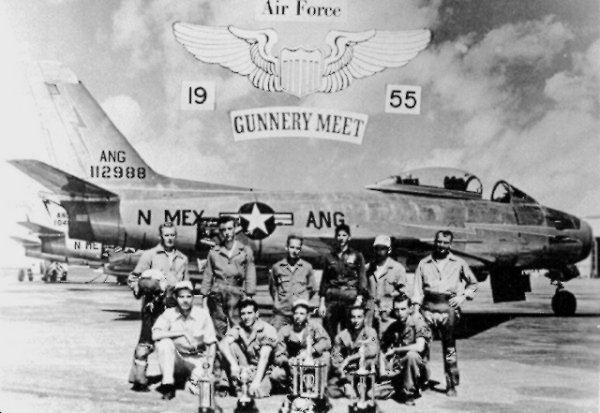
Members of the 188th Fighter Squadron in 1955

In August 1953, the 188th FIS received their first jet aircraft, the F-80C Shooting Star. Between 1953 and 1957, the 188th was one of three squadrons of the 140th Wing, with headquarters in Denver, Colorado. In 1957, the 188th was presented the Spaatz Trophy and the Air Force Association Trophy for being the outstanding tactical unit of the Air National Guard for the period 1 January 1956 through 31 December 1956. In 1957, the unit was re-designated and federally recognized as the 150th Tactical Fighter Group. On 1 July 1961, the 188th Fighter Interceptor Squadron assumed 24-hour Air Defense alert status at Kirtland Air Force Base. In 1958, the 188th became the first squadron in the Air National Guard to receive the F-100 Super Sabre, 12 F-100As and two F-100Fs. This conversion raised unit strength to 956 officers and airmen.

In April 1961, an aircraft malfunction caused an AIM-9 Sidewinder air-to-air missile to launch and shoot down a B-52B Stratofortress bomber near Grants, New Mexico. The B-52B (AF Ser. No. 53-0380, aircraft nickname "Ciudad Juarez") from the 95th Bomb Wing took off from Biggs Air Force Base, at El Paso, Texas on a practice mission. During an intercept by two New Mexico ANG F-100As, an AIM-9B shook loose and impacted one of the engine pods on the left wing, taking the B-52's left wing off in the subsequent explosion. Three B-52 crewmembers died; the F-100 pilot was absolved of any blame.

In the fall of 1962, the Cuban Missile Crisis put the 150th on an alert status that lasted for 90 days. Later, the 150th was reassigned from Aerospace Defense Command to Tactical Air Command and equipped with the F-100C fighter-bomber.

=== Vietnam War ===
In January 1968, the group was activated as a result of the Pueblo Crisis, and in June of that year the 188th Tactical Fighter Squadron and approximately 250 maintenance and support personnel were deployed to Tuy Hoa Air Base, Vietnam. Remaining group members were assigned to various bases in South Korea. The unit flew over 6000 combat sorties in the F-100C Super Sabre and amassed over 630 medals and decorations before release from federal active duty in June 1969. Captain Michael Adams was killed in action and Major Bobby Neeld and First Lieutenant Mitchell Lane are listed as missing in action. The unit received the USAF Outstanding Unit Award with a bronze "V" for valor.

=== 1970s ===
In New Mexico, units of both the Army and Air Guard were ordered to State duty in 1970 to assist local and State police during campus riots at the University of New Mexico.

In 1973 the 150th Tactical Fighter Group converted from the F-100C to the A-7D Corsair II. In 1977, the unit participated in the "Coronet Ante" exercise, which was part of the NATO "Coldfire" exercise in Europe. The 150th TFG deployed nine A-7Ds to Gilze Rijen Air Base, The Netherlands, from 2 September through 27 September 1977. Close air support missions were flown over The Netherlands, France, the United Kingdom, Germany, Belgium, and the North Sea.

During exercise "Bright Star '81", the 150th TFG set an A-7 and first endurance record of 11 1/2 hours flying non-stop from Pease Air Force Base, New Hampshire to Cairo West Air Base, Egypt.

=== Gulf War 1991 ===
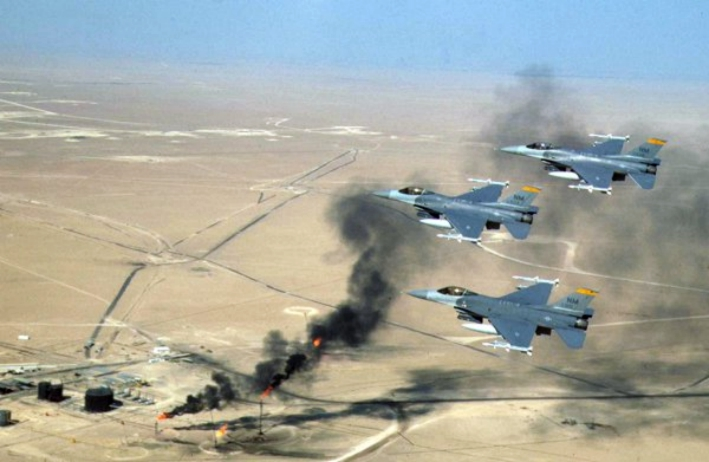
F-16C Fighting Falcons of the 188th Fighter Squadron flying over Kuwaiti oil wells during Operation Southern Watch, 1998

The 150th Fighter Group was partially activated in support of Operation Desert Storm. On 11 December 1990, 44 members of the 150th Security Police Flight and other unit members were deployed to Saudi Arabia. All members returned home by May 1991. In the following year, the 150th was redesignated as the 150th Fighter Wing (150 FW) as part of a redesignation of nearly all Air National Guard flying units previously designated as groups. The 150 FW also transitioned from the A-7 to the F-16C/D Fighting Falcon.

=== War on terror ===
Since the September 11 attacks 2001, the 150th FW supported several deployments connected with Operation Noble Eagle. Within hours of the terrorist attacks on New York City and Washington D.C., 150th FW aircrews flew combat air patrol sorties over key resources within the western part of the United States, and continued to do so for many months. To protect the local homeland of New Mexico, 150th Security Forces Squadron (SFS) personnel provided several months of security protection to the Albuquerque International Airport.

=== 2010 Combat Air Force Restructure ===
In 2009, it was decided to assign the 21 F-16C/D aircraft of the New Mexico ANG to other Air National Guard units in the District of Columbia Air National Guard and the Vermont Air National Guard as part of the "Fiscal Year 2010 Combat Air Force Restructure". The last two F-16s left Kirtland AFB in September 2010. The 150th FW was to take over the mission of Kirtland's 58th Special Operations Wing. An Air Education and Training Command (AETC) unit, the 58 SOW trains about 2,200 military personnel a year in special operations and combat search and rescue utilizing the HC-130P/N King, MC-130H Combat Talon II, MC-130J Commando II, the HC-130J King II, HH-60G Pavehawk, UH-1N Iroquois, and CV-22 Osprey.

=== 2013 to Present Day ===
Located on Kirtland Air Force Base that borders Albuquerque, New Mexico, on December 1, 2013 due to the Department of the Air Force restructuring and realignment, the 150th Fighter Wing was renamed as the 150th Special Operations Wing through a Total Force Integration with the 58th Special Operations Wing. This historic redesignation hails the activation of a new mission for the 150th from a fighter unit to a special operations training unit.

Currently, the 150th SOW has one C-26 Metroliner support aircraft which is very involved with the 58th Special Operations Wing's day–to-day operations. They are an essential part of the operations and maintenance on the hull of the following aircraft; HC-130 P/N, HC-130J, MC-130J, HH-60G, and 6 “by-name” members on the CV-22. The 150 SOW maintains its daily operations with the support of over 335 full-time personnel and approximately another 650 Drill Status Guardsmen.

Today, the NM ANG is composed of State Headquarters, the 150th Special Operations Wing, 150th Maintenance Group, 150th Operations Group, 150th Mission Support Group, 150th Medical Group, 250th Intel Squadron, and 210th RED HORSE Squadron. In addition, the wing is assigned one C-26 support aircraft and supports both domestic and world-wide Combatant Commander taskings.

== See also ==
- New Mexico Department Of Military Affairs
- New Mexico State Defense Force
- New Mexico Wing Civil Air Patrol
