= Mark E. Smith (Civil Air Patrol) =

American military officer

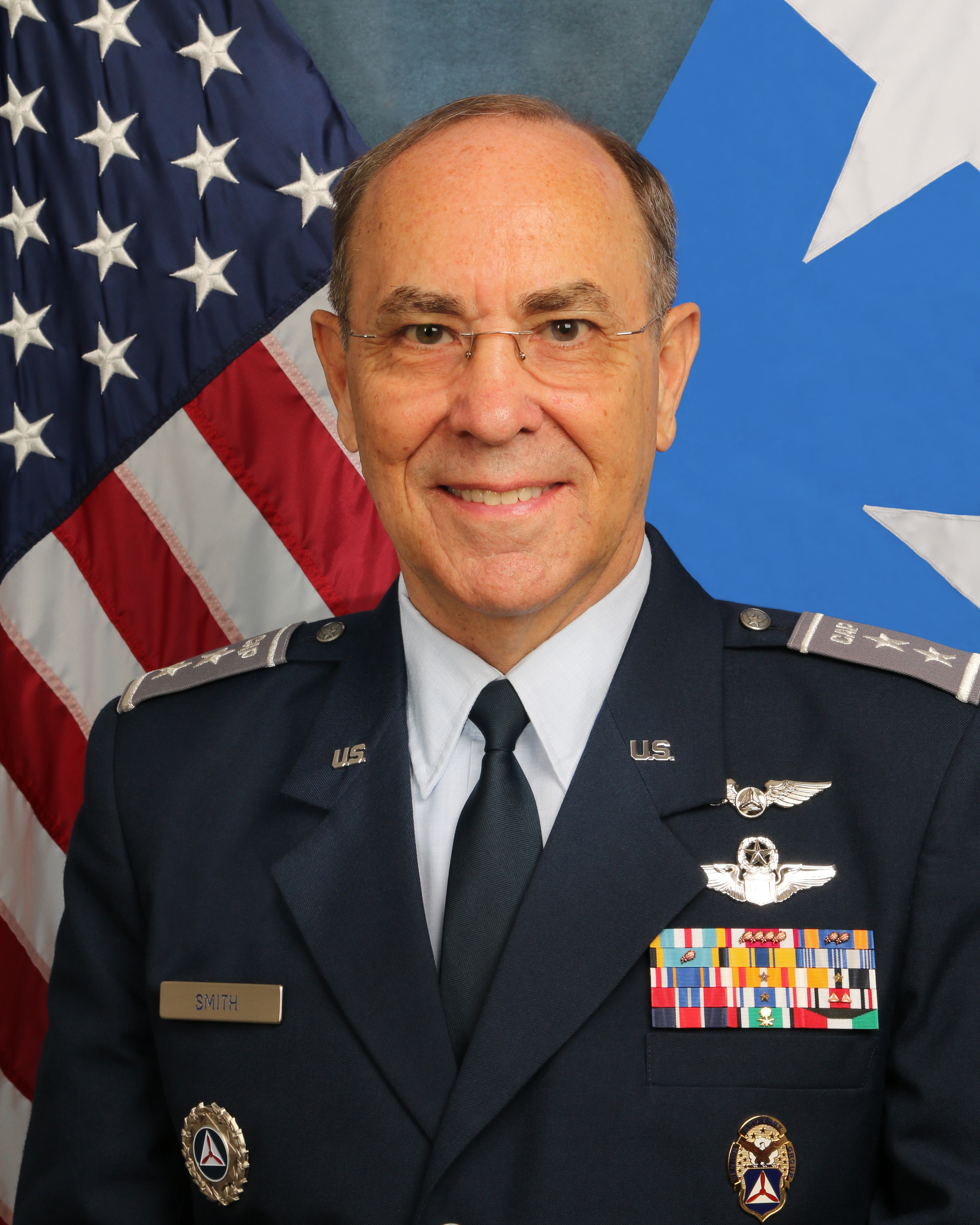
- Education: United States Air Force Academy (BS); Embry Riddle Aeronautical University (MAvMgmt); Olivet Nazarene University (D.Ed.)
- Military career
- Allegiance: United States
- Branch: Civil Air Patrol; United States Air Force
- Service years: 2005—Present (CAP); 1974—2000 (USAF)
- Rank: Major General, CAP; Colonel, USAF
- Commands: CAP National Commander; CAP Southwest Region; New Mexico Wing; Albuquerque Heights Composite Squadron; 27th Fighter Squadron
- Conflicts: Operation Desert Storm
- Awards: Defense Superior Service Medal; Meritorious Service Medal (5); Air Medal (3); Distinguished Service Medal; Exceptional Service Award; Meritorious Service Award (2)

Major General Mark E. Smith is the 24th National Commander of the Civil Air Patrol. Maj Gen Smith succeeded Maj Gen Joseph Vazquez as National Commander on September 2, 2017. He led over 63,000 members across the U.S. in fulfilling CAP's congressionally chartered missions of Emergency Services, Cadet Programs and Aerospace Education, including Homeland Security as the newest member of the Air Force’s Total Force. He was previously the Southwest Region Commander and New Mexico Wing Commander.

== Education ==
- United States Air Force Academy - Bachelor's of Science in International Affairs
- Air Force Squadron Officer School
- Air Command and Staff College
- Air War College
- Embry Riddle Aeronautical University - Master's of Aviation Management
- Olivet Nazarene University - Doctor of Education in Ethical Leadership

== Military and private work experience ==
General Smith retired as a colonel from the U.S. Air Force in 2000 after 26 years of service. A veteran of Operation Desert Shield/Desert Storm, he later commanded the 27th Fighter Squadron at Langley Air Force Base, Virginia. Later he served as Director of the Office of the Secretary of Defense's Joint Advanced Distributed Simulation Joint Test and Evaluation (JADS JT&E) program.

In the private sector, General Smith worked at senior levels for both small and large corporations and as a private consultant. He also served as an International Test and Evaluation Association (ITEA) board member and as the first chair of the Simulation Interoperability Standards Organization's executive committee.

== Civil Air Patrol ==
General Smith began in Civil Air Patrol in 2005. He is a CAP pilot and served in command positions within all levels of the organization. As Region Commander, he led CAP's Leadership Development Working Group, a national-level team that has developed products, tools and courses to better equip CAP's leaders. This group was responsible for the Unit Commander's (UCC) Course.

General Smith was appointed by the Civil Air Patrol Board of Governors on June 18, 2017, to a three-year term as National Commander/CEO which commenced on September 2, 2017. As National Commander, he was the highest-ranking CAP officer and served as Civil Air Patrol's Chief Executive Officer and as an advisor to the CAP Board of Governors, the organization's governing body. General Smith also led the CAP Command Council and the CAP Senior Advisory Group (CSAG). On August 8, 2019, CAP's Board of Governors extended General Smith's three-year term for one additional year. Major General Edward Phelka succeeded Major General Smith as National Commander on August 26, 2021.

=== Commands held ===
- CAP National Commander (September 2, 2017 – August 26, 2021)
- Southwest Region Commander (June 27, 2015 – September 1, 2017)
- New Mexico Wing Commander (June 27, 2011 – June 29, 2015)
- New Mexico Wing Vice Commander (2010 - 2011)
- Albuquerque Heights Composite Squadron Commander (January 13, 2006 – April 1, 2008)
- 27th Fighter Squadron

== USAF awards and decorations ==
Personal decorations
Defense Superior Service Medal
Meritorious Service Medal with four bronze oak leaf clusters
Air Medal with two bronze oak leaf clusters
Aerial Achievement Medal with bronze oak leaf cluster
Air Force Commendation Medal
Air Force Achievement Medal
Unit awards
Air Force Outstanding Unit Award with bronze oak leaf cluster
Air Force Organizational Excellence Award with two bronze leaf clusters
Service Awards
Combat Readiness Medal with three bronze oak leaf clusters
Campaign and service medals
National Defense Service Medal with bronze service star
Southwest Asia Service Medal with two service stars
Military Outstanding Volunteer Service Medal
Air Force Overseas Short Tour Service Ribbon
Air Force Overseas Long Tour Service Ribbon
Air Force Longevity Service Award with silver and bronze oak leaf clusters
Small Arms Expert Marksmanship Ribbon
Air Force Training Ribbon
Foreign awards
Kuwait Liberation Medal (Saudi Arabia)
Kuwait Liberation Medal (Kuwait)

Other accoutrements
US Air Force Command Pilot Badge
Basic Parachutist Badge

== See also ==
- National Commander of the Civil Air Patrol
