= New Mexico State Defense Force =

Reserve military force of New Mexico, US

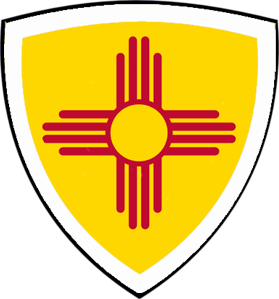
- Country: United States
- Allegiance: New Mexico
- Type: State defense force
- Role: Military reserve force
- Size: 25
- Part of: Department of Military Affairs of the State of New Mexico
- Website: NMSDF Official Website

Commanders
- Civilian leadership: Governor Michelle Lujan Grisham; Governor of the State of New Mexico
- State military leadership: Major General Miguel Aguilar; Adjutant General of New Mexico; Brigadier General Raphael Warren; Commanding General, New Mexico State Defense Force

The New Mexico State Defense Force (NMSDF; Spanish: Fuerza de Defensa del Estado de Nuevo México), formerly the New Mexico State Guard (NMSG; Spanish: Guardia Estatal de Nuevo México), is part of the armed forces of the U.S. state of New Mexico. It is a reserve military force that works parallel to the state's National Guard. Authorized under the constitutions of the United States and New Mexico, the NMSDF is organized as an internal security and emergency services reserve force.

The New Mexico State Defense Force is one of three military divisions of the New Mexico Department of Military Affairs (DMA), along with the New Mexico Army National Guard and New Mexico Air National Guard. The DMA is headed by Adjutant General of New Mexico, who holds the rank of Major General, a Deputy Adjutant General, and three Assistant Adjutants General. The NMSDF falls under the direct supervision of the assistant adjutant general of New Mexico for state guard affairs, who holds the rank of Brigadier General. The Governor of New Mexico is commander-in-chief of the NMSDF, which unlike the New Mexico National Guard cannot be called to federal service and remains under exclusive state jurisdiction.

In September 2014, Brigadier General David Torres, then commander of the New Mexico State Defense Force, announced a restructuring and modernization plan, which would be followed by an intensified recruiting campaign.

== History ==
The New Mexico State Defense Force traces its lineage to the American Civil War, when Colonel Canby of the Union Army recruited troops for the First through the Fifth New Mexico Volunteers to fight alongside the Regular Army. During the Civil War, the units gained notoriety at the Battle of Valverde.

During World War II, the state of New Mexico created the New Mexico State Guard to replace the National Guard units sent overseas. New Mexico had State Guardsmen on continuous duty by December 1941, and by June 1944, the New Mexico State Guard counted over 600 members.

== Training ==
Procedures and training for the New Mexico State Defense Force follow U.S. Army regulations and field manuals. While most of the soldiers in the NMSDF are former members of the Armed Forces of the United States, state guardsmen are not required to have prior federal military experience. The NMSDF now offers its own training in basic military discipline and demeanor, officer knowledge and skills, NCO knowledge and skills, and various operational aspects of assisting the National Guard and emergency management agencies with their state duties.

Unit training includes emergency field medicine, desert and mountain search and rescue, and securing and operating a “Receive, Stage, and Store” warehouse for the Strategic National Stockpile during large-scale emergencies.

The NMSDF requires that all personnel become qualified in the National Incident Management System (NIMS) and trains its members to become Military Emergency Management Specialists.

== Duties ==
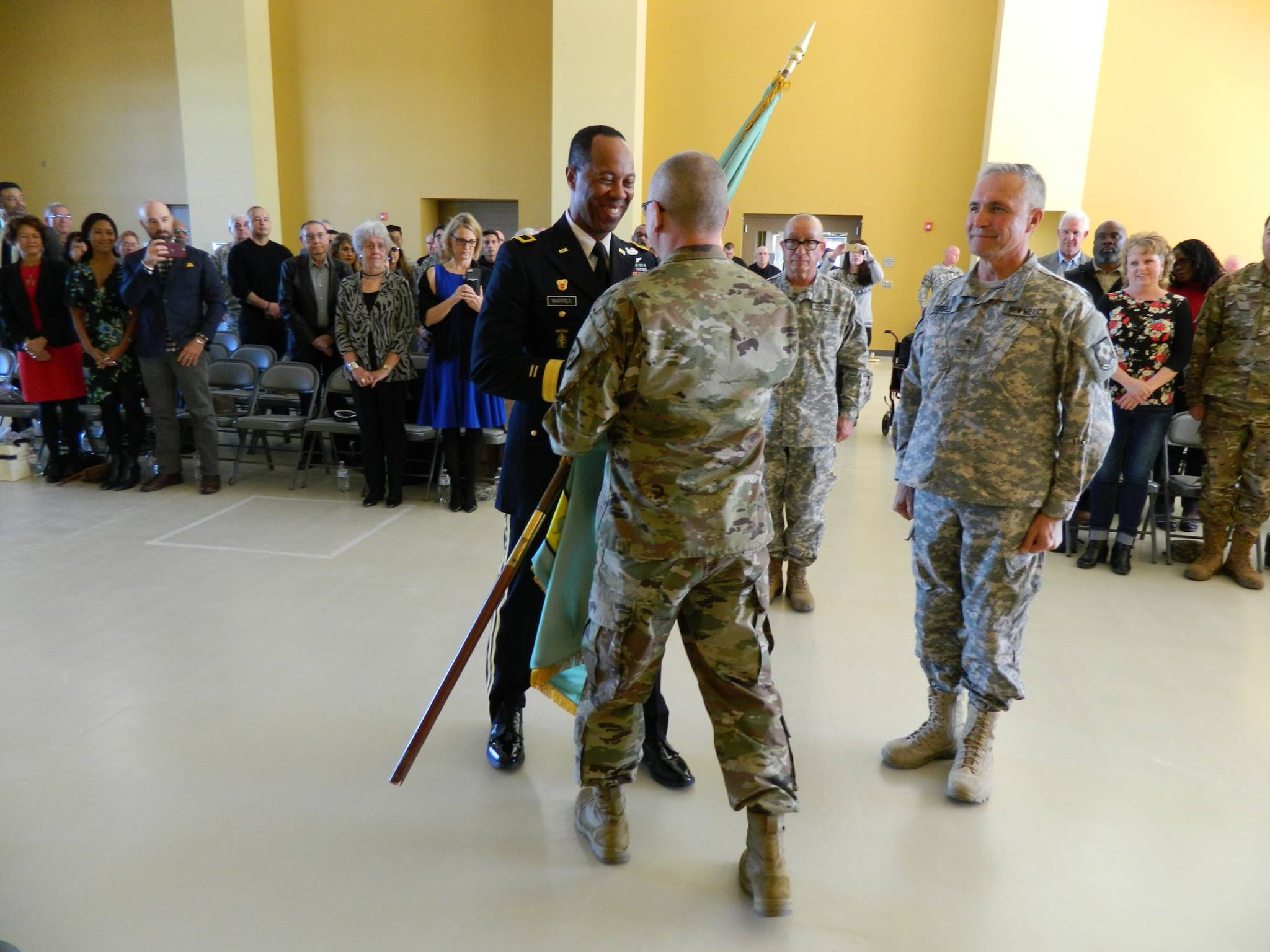
Brig. Gen. Raphael Warren (NMSDF) assumes command from Brig. Gen. (NMSDF) David Torres at a change of command ceremony in 2019.

The New Mexico State Defense Force presently has the mission areas of radio communications, emergency field medicine, shelter operations, provision of honor guard duties, chaplaincy, heavy vehicle driving and maintenance, and public affairs. In all of these areas, the State Defense Force has the support of the New Mexico National Guard. While the State Defense Force functions as a reserve unit to the National Guard, it also has its own missions to assist and support community groups and law enforcement agencies in local communities. Despite some degree of autonomy, all present NMSDF missions must be approved by the Adjutant General before becoming operational. State guardsmen are required to attend mandatory military drill at least one weekend per month, and, can be activated and/or deployed by orders of the Adjutant General of the State of New Mexico, acting on behalf of and in the name of the Commander-In-Chief (the governor of New Mexico). Many members of the NMSDF are prior-military, and many are mid-career professionals like attorneys, physicians, engineers, professors, medical technicians, truck drivers, and graphic artists.

The New Mexico State Defense Force maintains a medical unit, the 47th Medical Troop (CAV), which is simultaneously recognized as a unit of the Medical Reserve Corps (MRC) through the US Health and Human Services Office of the Assistant Secretary for Preparedness and Response. The 47th contains both medical and non-medical personnel, who are trained to aid in recovery from natural or man-made disasters by providing medical aid and sheltering. The 47th has the additional responsibility of supporting and securing the US Strategic National Stockpile and support search and rescue operations.

In September 2013, specific personnel from the HHD, the 47th Medical Troop (MRC), and the Chaplains Corps were activated to several locations to set up and assist in shelter operations and community resource management and provide medical support in a recovery operations deployment following severe flooding.

== Legal protection ==
=== Employment protection ===
Employers in New Mexico are prohibited from refusing to hire, penalize, or fire any employee because of his or her membership in the NMSDF, or because of that employee's absence from work due to a deployment; violations constitute a misdemeanor.

In addition to the employment discrimination protection provided to NMSDF members, all state, county, municipal, school district and other public employees who are members of the state defense force are entitled to fifteen days of paid leave per year for drills or deployments, separate from any vacation time or other leave time they may be given.

=== Pay ===
Members of the NMSDF do not receive pay for weekend drills. New Mexico law, however, authorizes state guardsmen to be eligible for worker's compensation if they are injured in the line of duty.

== See also ==
- Naval militia
- New Mexico Wing Civil Air Patrol
- United States Coast Guard Auxiliary
