= New Mexico Army National Guard =

Component of the US Army and military of the U.S. state of New Mexico

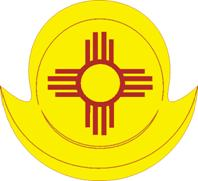
- New Mexico Army National Guard Headquarters distinctive unit insignia
- Active: 1903–present
- Country: United States
- Allegiance: New Mexico
- Branch: United States Army
- Type: ARNG Headquarters Command
- Role: United States Army National Guard
- Size: 2,286
- Part of: New Mexico National Guard
- Engagements: Pancho Villa Expedition; World War II; Operation Enduring Freedom; Operation Iraqi Freedom

Insignia
- New Mexico Army National Guard Crest

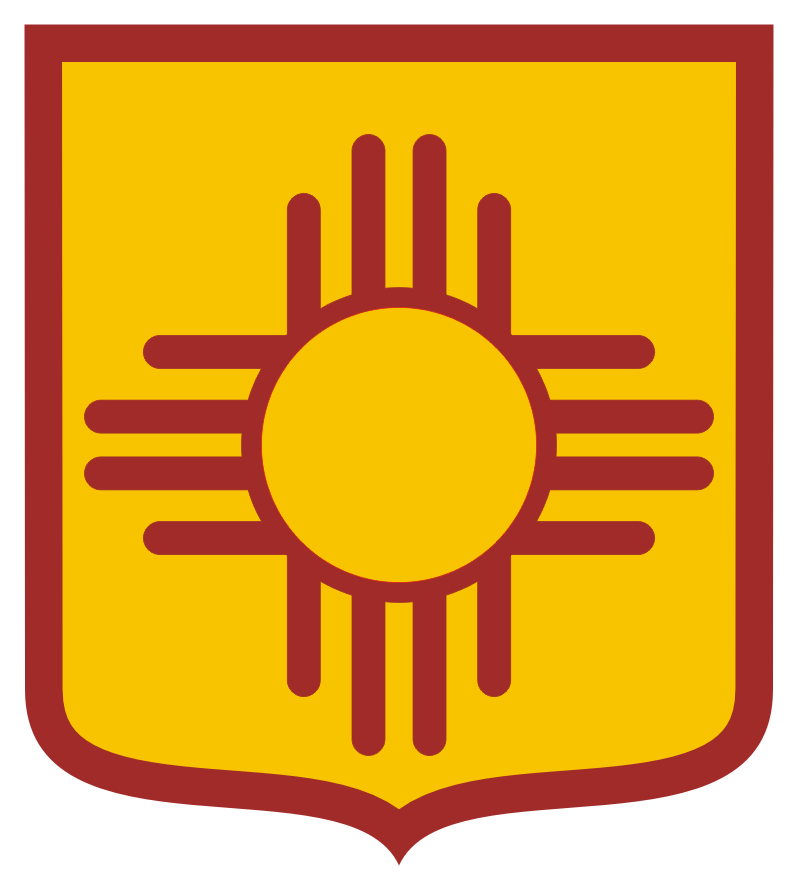
- New Mexico Army National Guard STARC SSI

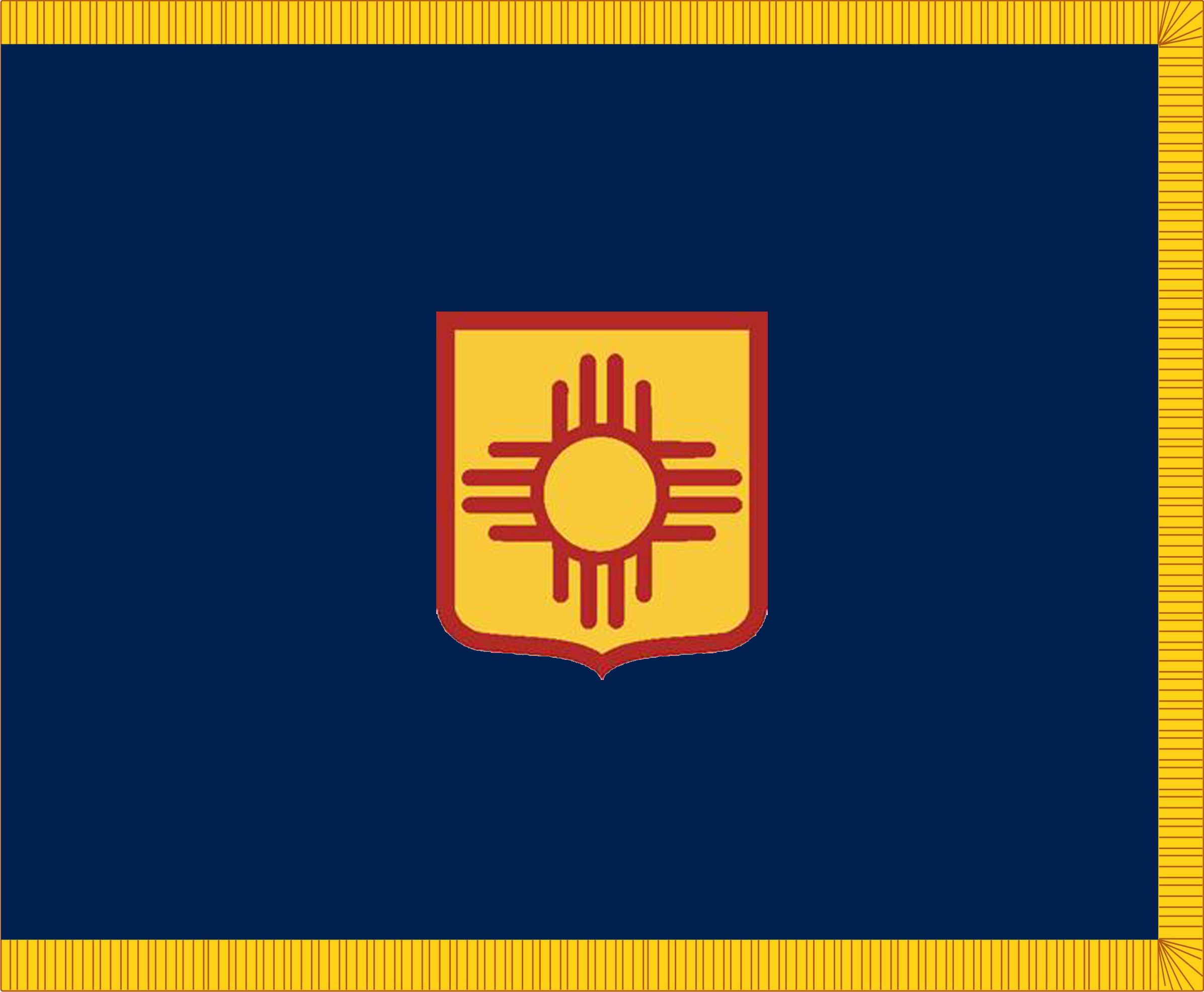
- New Mexico Army National Guard Headquarters Flag

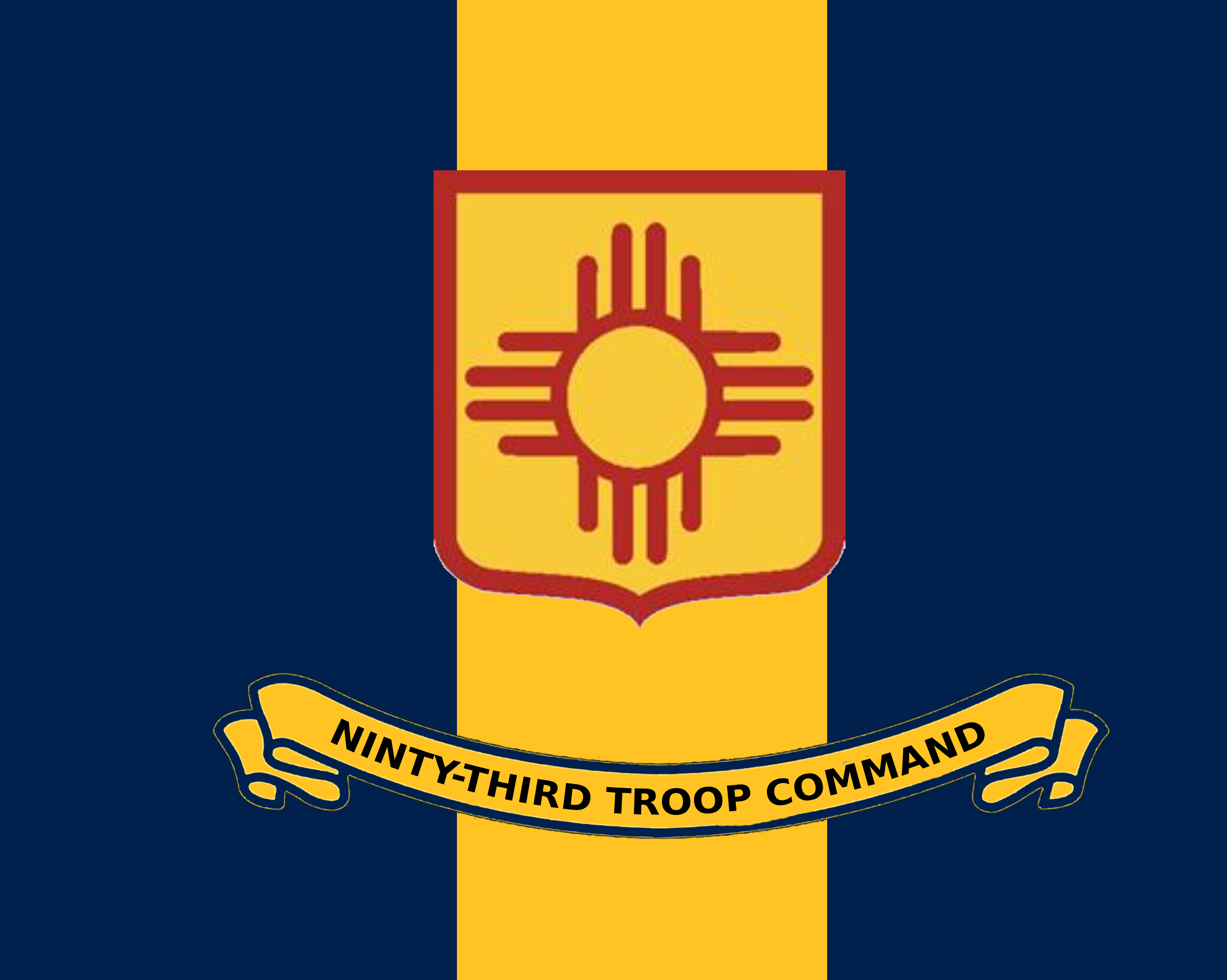
- New Mexico Army National Guard 93rd Troop Command Flag

The New Mexico Army National Guard (NM ARNG) is a component of the United States Army and the New Mexico National Guard. The NM ARNG traces its history back to units formed when New Mexico was still a territory.

Nationwide coordination of the State National Guard organisms is maintained through the National Guard Bureau. The same United States Army ranks and insignia are used and National Guardsmen are eligible to receive all United States military awards. The New Mexico Guard also bestows a number of state awards for local services rendered in or to the state of New Mexico.

== History ==
The first Territorial Militia was provided for by a system of laws devised by General Stephen W. Kearny, commonly known as the Kearny Code, after Kearny occupied New Mexico in 1846. Then in 1851 the first territorial Legislature created the office of Adjutant General and placed the territorial Militia under its jurisdiction.

In 1862, the Territorial Militia, also known as the New Mexico Volunteers, played a decisive role in the defeat of Confederate forces in the Battle of Glorieta Pass. During 1863 and 1864, the Militia was also active in Navajo and other Indian campaigns of the period.

The New Mexico Volunteer Militia was redesignated 17 March 1897 as the New Mexico National Guard.

After the Spanish–American War began in 1898, volunteer forces were organized, which included Teddy Roosevelt's "Rough Riders." Many New Mexico Guardsmen helped form the 2nd Squadron, 1st United States Cavalry, which served with Roosevelt at the legendary charge of San Juan Hill.

After the war with Spain, units of the New Mexico National Guard were again placed in active service on the Mexican border to pursue Pancho Villa after Mexican forces raided Columbus, New Mexico in 1916. The Guard spent one year on this border duty, hardening themselves to the rough field conditions of the desert southwest.

After World War I, the Guard in New Mexico began to be reorganized under the National Defense Act of 1920, eventually forming the 111th Cavalry Regiment, the 120th Engineers (less the Medical Detachment and 1st Battalion), and Battery A, 158th Field Artillery. In 1939, the War Department suggested the 111th Cavalry convert to another branch of service, and the officers of the command jointly selected Coast Artillery. In 1940, the 111th was re-designated the 200th Coast Artillery and the battery of the 158th was reorganized as part of the new 104th Anti-Tank Battalion. In 1940-41, the entire New Mexico National Guard was called to active duty for what was supposed to be a one-year training period.

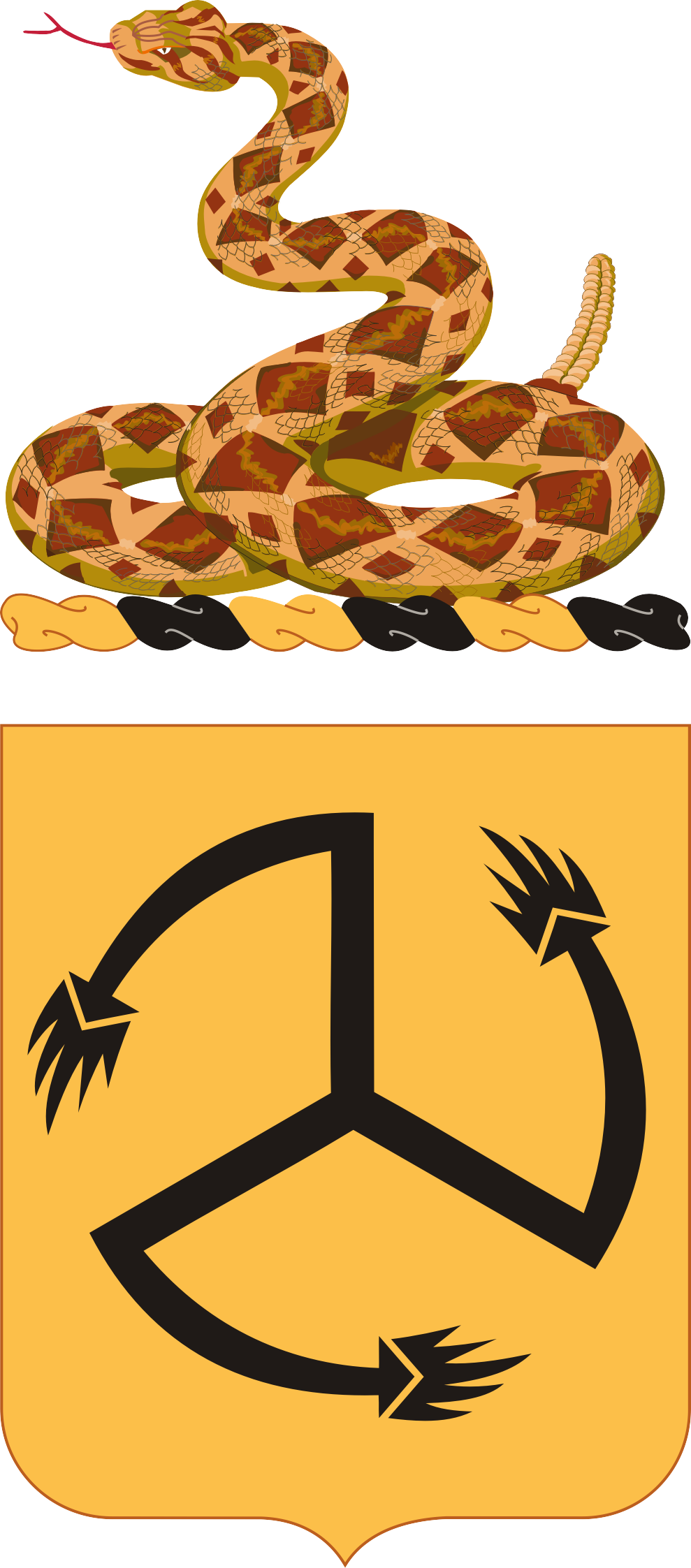
Insignia of the 200th Coast Artillery

In August 1941, the 200th was given notice that it had been selected for an overseas assignment of great importance. At about 0300 hours on 8 December 1941, the 200th went on full alert when the night radio crew picked up commercial broadcasts telling of the Japanese attack at Pearl Harbor, Hawaii.

In 1970, New Mexico Army National Guard soldiers were involved in an incident where they stabbed students at the University of New Mexico with their bayonets during protests.

During the 1983–1989 time frame the New Mexico Army National Guard began a complete modernization program to gain high technology type units. The 5th Battalion, 200th Air Defense Artillery (Roland) was fielded at McGregor Range (a part of Fort Bliss located in New Mexico). This unit was inactivated in September 1988 due to Federal budget cuts. A complete conversion of Duster battalions to MIM-72 Chaparral battalions was accomplished. A new anti-aircraft missile battalion equipped with the MIM-23 Hawk was put in place at Rio Rancho, New Mexico.

On 1 October 1993, the Headquarters Battery, 2d Battalion, 200th Air Defense Artillery was expanded to form the 2d Battalion, 200th Air Defense Artillery. The battalion was converted, reorganized, and redesignated 15 December 1995 as the 202d Field Artillery, a parent regiment under the United States Army Regimental System, to consist of the 1st Battalion.

In 2005, the 3d Battalion, 200th Air Defense Artillery, was reorganized as the 1st Battalion, 200th Infantry Regiment.

On 1 February 2008, the 111th Air Defense Artillery Brigade, New Mexico National Guard, ceased its air defense mission and was reorganized and redesignated as a maneuver enhancement brigade. It was subsequently converted to a sustainment brigade.

== Units ==
The New Mexico Army National Guard includes the following units:

- 93rd Troop Command (Santa Fe)
  - 1st Battalion, 200th Infantry Regiment (Las Cruces)
  - 226th Military Police Battalion (Farmington)
  - 44th Army Band
- 111th Sustainment Brigade (Rio Rancho)
  - Special Troops Battalion (Rio Rancho)
  - 515th Combat Sustainment Support Battalion (Roswell) - heir to lineage of 515th Coast Artillery
  - 615th Transportation Battalion (Springer)
- 515th Regiment (Regional Training Institute) (Santa Fe)
- Detachment 44 Operational Support Airlift (Santa Fe)
- Army Aviation Support Facility at Santa Fe Regional Airport
- Army Aviation Operations Facility at Las Cruces International Airport
- Company G, 2nd Battalion, 168th Aviation Regiment (MEDEVAC) (HQ at Santa Fe Regional Airport)
- Company C, 3rd Battalion (Security and Support), 140th Aviation Regiment (HQ at Las Cruces International Airport)
- Detachment 6, Company A, 2nd Battalion, 245th Aviation Regiment (HQ at Santa Fe Regional Airport)

== See also ==
- New Mexico Department of Military Affairs
- New Mexico Air National Guard
- New Mexico State Defense Force
