= 111th Sustainment Brigade =

- 111th Sustainment Brigade shoulder sleeve insignia
- Active: 1 September 2016 – present
- Country: United States
- Allegiance: New Mexico Army National Guard
- Branch: United States Army National Guard
- Type: Sustainment
- Role: Logistics
- Size: Brigade
- Part of: 36th Infantry Division (United States)
- HQ: Rio Rancho, New Mexico

Commanders
- Current commander: Colonel Pia G. Romero

Insignia
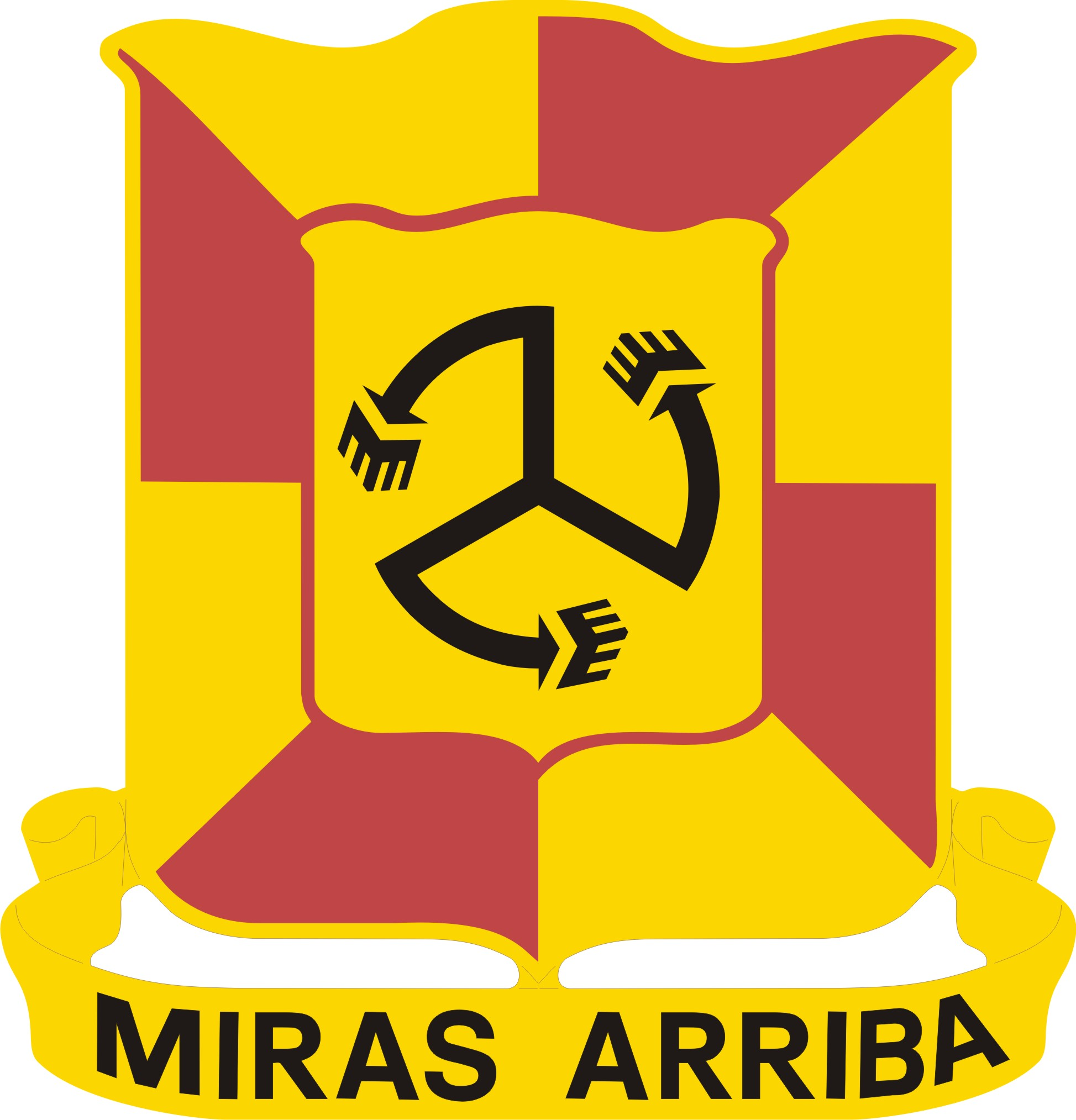
- 111th Sustainment Brigade DUI

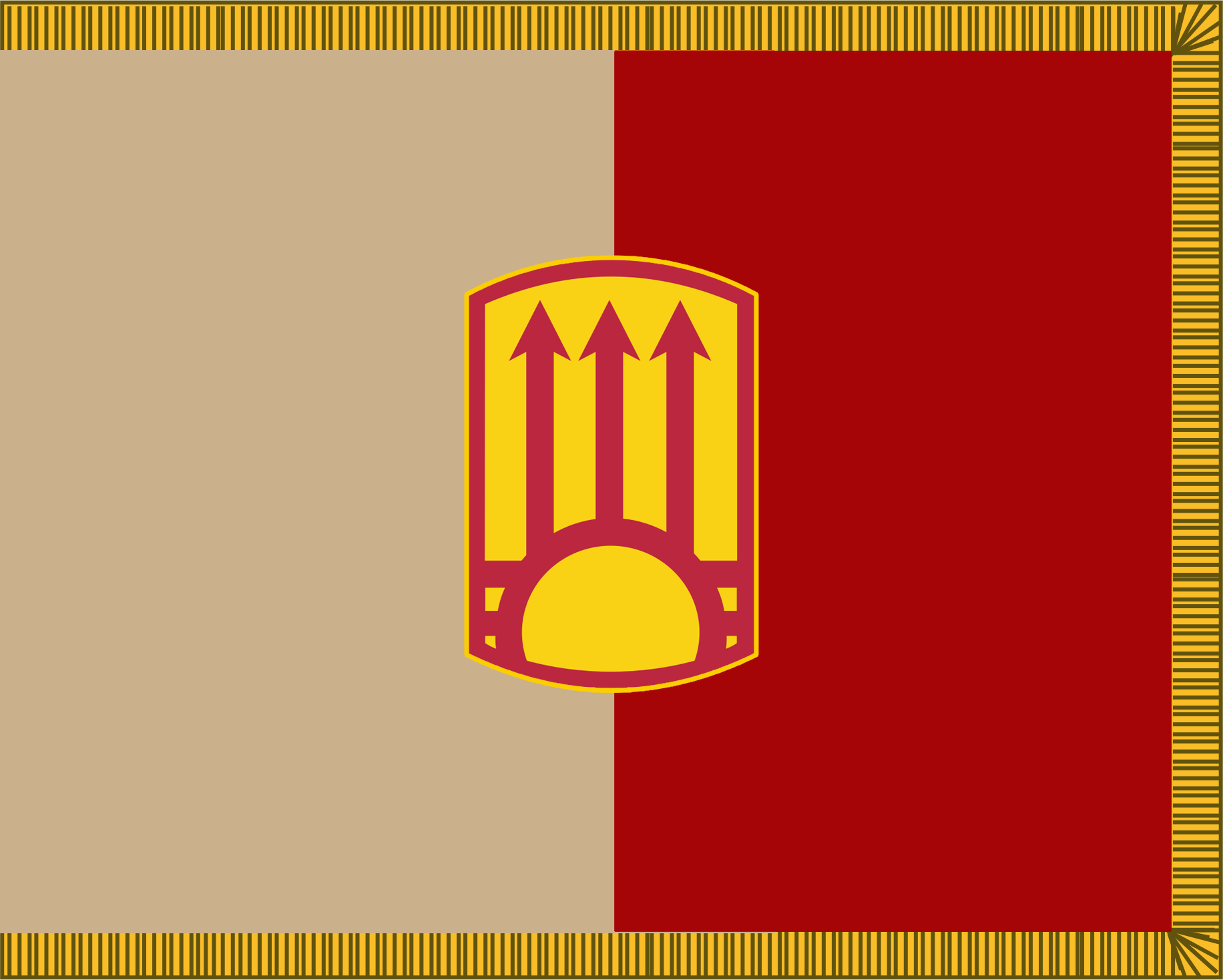
- Identification symbol
- Identification symbol: 111th Sustainment Brigade Flag

The 111th Sustainment Brigade is a sustainment brigade of the New Mexico Army National Guard, headquartered at Rio Rancho.

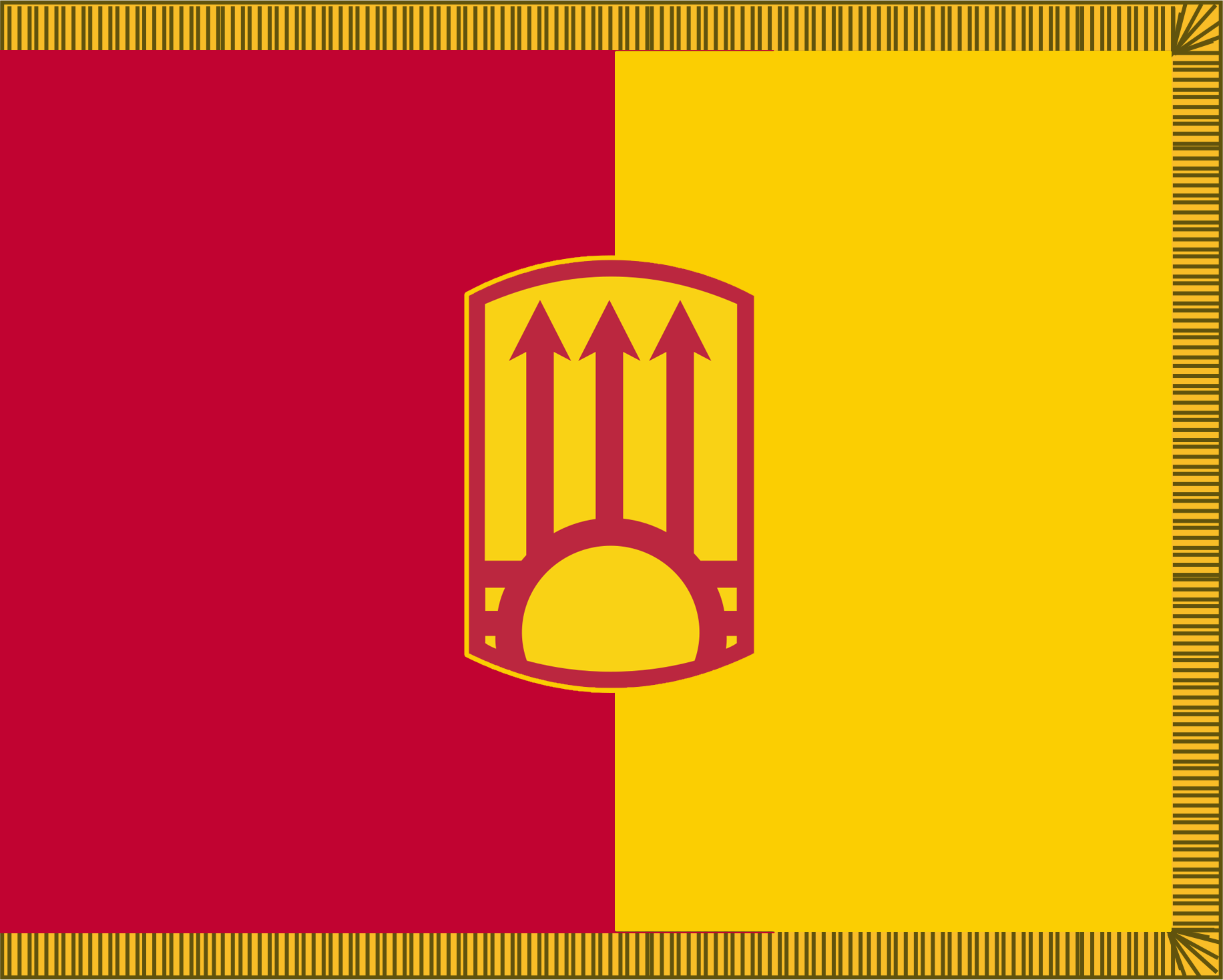
111th Air Defense Artillery Brigade Flag

The brigade was organized as the 111th Air Defense Artillery Brigade of the United States Army. The 200th Air Defense Artillery Regiment was reorganized on 1 September 1975 to consist of the 1st Battalion, an element of the 49th Armored Division; the 2nd Battalion, an element of the 47th Infantry Division; the 3rd Battalion, an element of the 50th Armored Division; and the 4th Battalion, an element of the 40th Infantry Division. 1st Battalion headquarters was at Roswell, 2nd Battalion at Las Cruces, 3rd Battalion at Albuquerque, and 4th Battalion at Tucumcari. Equipped with the M42 Duster self-propelled anti-aircraft gun, the battalions served as divisional air defense artillery units of National Guard divisions but were under the administrative control of Headquarters, 111th Air Defense Artillery Brigade. The 5th Battalion was activated on 1 July 1983, the first and only Roland-equipped United States Army unit, and reached initial operating capability in December 1985. The majority of its personnel volunteered for full-time service at McGregor Range, administered by Fort Bliss. As a result, the battalion was affiliated with the active 11th Air Defense Artillery Brigade and under the control of Central Command and Forces Command. During its five years of existence, the battalion made 101 Roland firings during exercises.

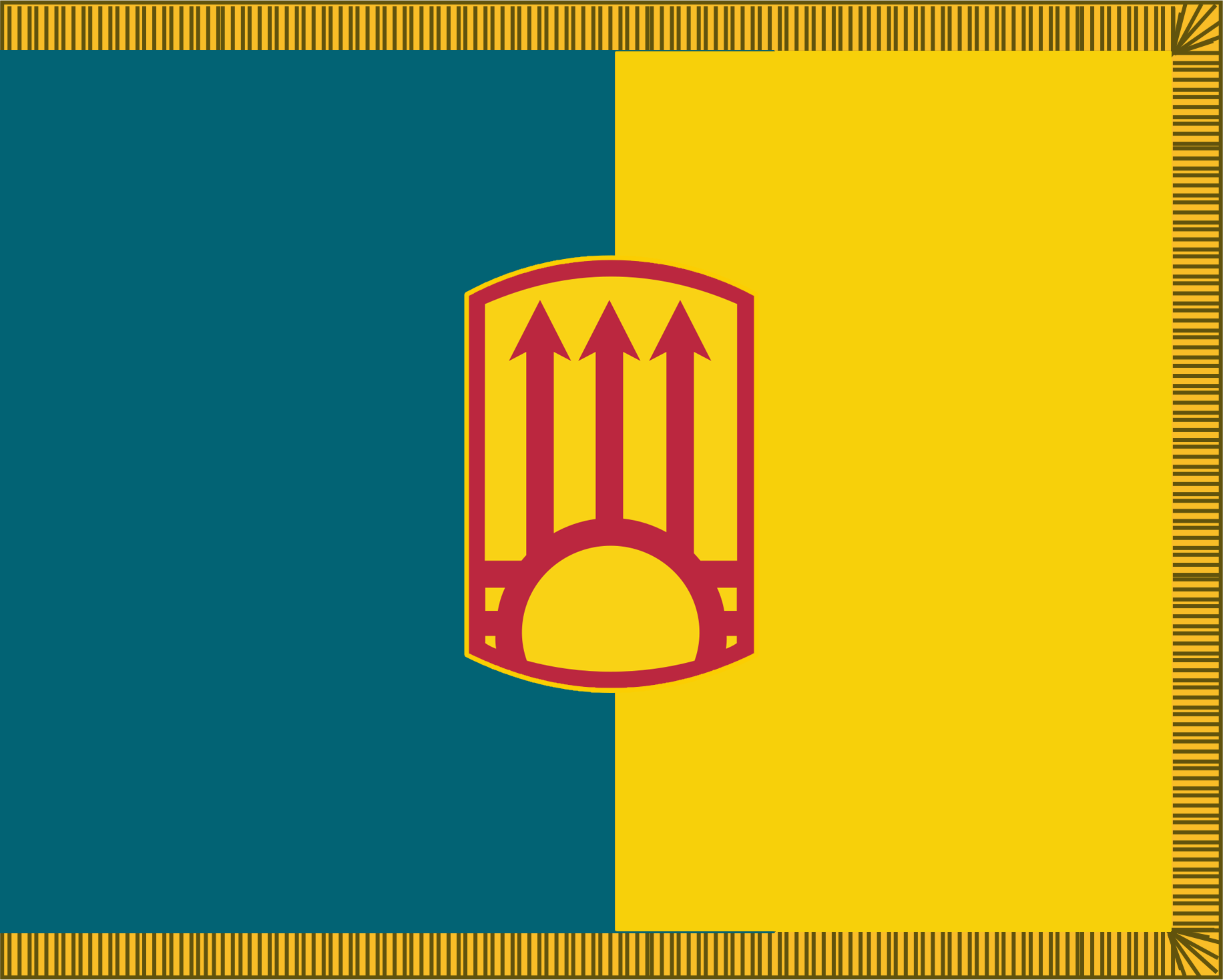
111th Maneuver Enhancement Brigade Flag

The 111th Air Defense Artillery Brigade headquarters became the 111th Maneuver Enhancement Brigade headquarters during 2005. Similar to a special troops battalion, its mission was to support units of the Regular Army. The 111th Maneuver Enhancement Brigade headquarters deployed to Guantanamo Bay and Kosovo. On 1 September 2016, the brigade was redesignated, once again, as a sustainment brigade that focuses on providing mission command for combat support and combat service support units. The brigade is designed to operate independently in a theater of operations, in conjunction with other sustainment brigades under the command of a sustainment command (expeditionary), or directly under a theater sustainment command. Following the sustainment brigade conversion, the 111th included the 111th Special Troops Battalion, 515th Combat Sustainment Support Battalion, and 615th Transportation Battalion.

In the aftermath of Hurricane Maria, the 115-strong brigade headquarters was sent to Puerto Rico in November 2017 for a month-long deployment supporting relief efforts under Joint Task Force-Puerto Rico. Under the command of Colonel Jamison Herrera, it served as the headquarters for relief efforts in San Juan.

Most recently, the 111th Sustainment Brigade has supported the on-going COVID-19 response efforts. The 111th has supported this effort by providing Personal Protective Equipment warehousing support, Rapid Response Team support to COVID-19 testing sites, long term health care facility cleaning, the establishment of alternate care sites, vaccine distribution and administration, and humanitarian support to the communities of New Mexico, the Pueblos, and the Navajo Nation.

== Organization ==
- 111th Sustainment Brigade, in Rio Rancho
  - 111th Special Troops Battalion, in Rio Rancho
    - Headquarters and Headquarters Company, 111th Sustainment Brigade, in Rio Rancho
    - 1209th Medical Company (Area Support), in Albuquerque
    - 3631st Signal Company, in Rio Rancho
    - 1954th Support Detachment (Contracting Team), in Rio Rancho
  - 515th Combat Sustainment Support Battalion, in Roswell
    - Headquarters and Headquarters Company, 515th Combat Sustainment Support Battalion, in Roswell
    - 642nd Ordnance Company (Support Maintenance), in Clovis
    - 920th Engineer Company (Engineer Construction Company), in Roswell
  - 615th Transportation Battalion (Motor), in Santa Fe
    - Headquarters and Headquarters Detachment, 615th Transportation Battalion (Motor), in Santa Fe
    - 720th Transportation Company (Medium Truck) (Cargo), in Las Vegas
    - 1115th Transportation Company (Medium Truck) (Cargo), in Albuquerque

== Commanders ==
- Colonel Kenneth A. Nava (April–October 2014)
- Colonel Miguel Aguilar (November 2014–October 2017)
- Colonel Jamison Herrera (October 2017–December 2019)
- Colonel Nathaniel Carper (December 2019–September 2020)
- Colonel Pia G. Romero (September 2020–October 2023)
- Colonel Eric James (October 2023–Present)

== Bibliography ==
- Johnson, Danny (Fall 1983). "111th Air Defense Artillery Brigade". Air Defense Artillery: 42–43. ISSN 0740-803X.
- Fox, Jack R. (Winter 1986). "From Duster to Chaparral". Air Defense Artillery: 35–36. ISSN 0740-803X.
