= 150th Special Operations Wing =

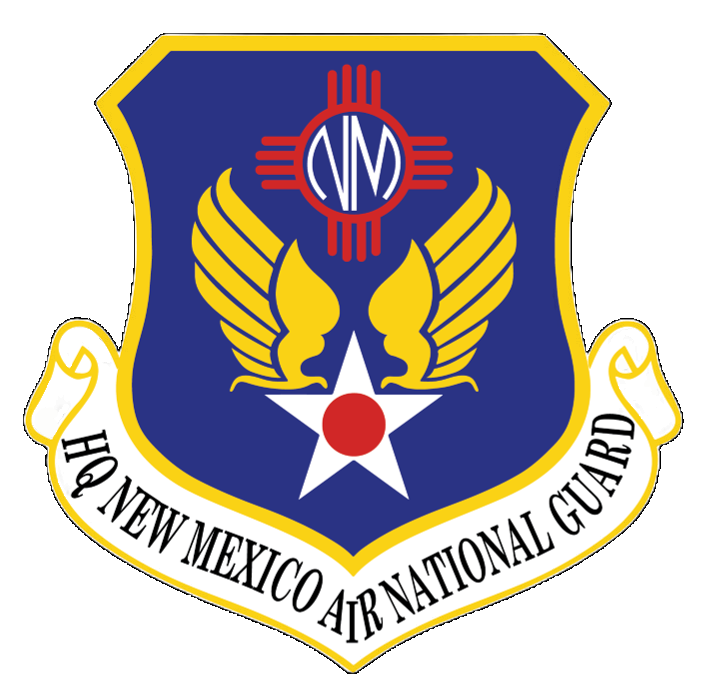
150th Special Operations Wing

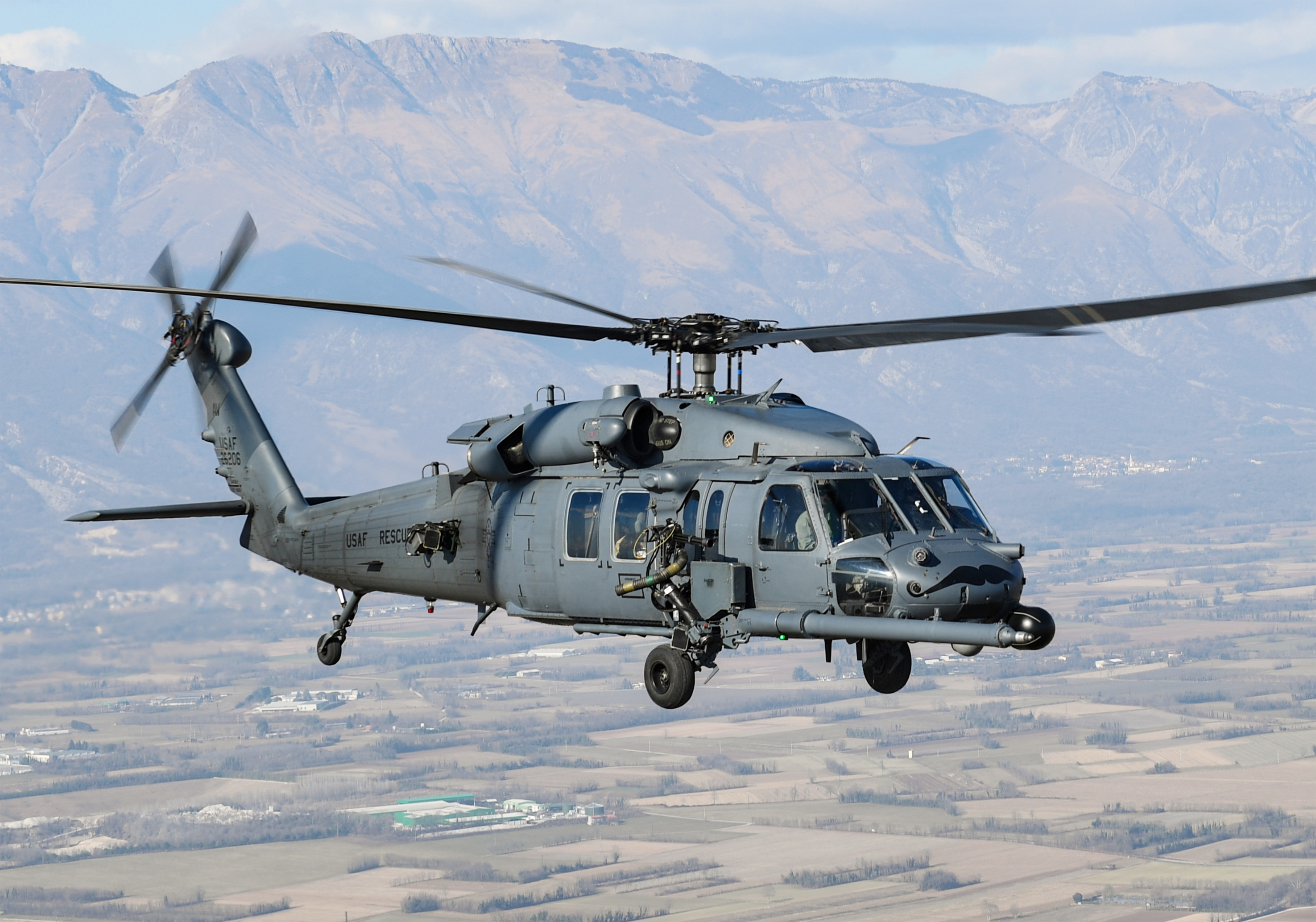
- HH-60G Pave Hawk as operated by the group
- Active: 1960–present
- Country: United States
- Allegiance: New Mexico
- Branch: Air National Guard
- Type: Wing
- Role: Special operations
- Part of: New Mexico Air National Guard
- Garrison/HQ: Kirtland Air Force Base

Commanders
- Current commander: Colonel Angela Black (interim commander)

Insignia
- 150th Special Operations Wing emblem

The 150th Special Operations Wing is a unit of the New Mexico Air National Guard, stationed at Kirtland Air Force Base. The wing traces its history back to the expansion of the 150th Tactical Fighter Group into the 150th Fighter Wing in 1995. In 2013, the Wing affiliated with the 58th Special Operations Wing to become the 150th Special Operations Wing, tasked with providing training for Air Force Special Operations Command units.

== History ==
The group was mobilized for the Vietnam War on 26 January 1968. Although its 188th Tactical Fighter Squadron deployed to Tuy Hoa Air Base, the group remained in the United States until it was returned to state control on 4 June 1969

The group began converting from the A-7D Corsair II to the F-16 Fighting Falcon at the beginning of the 1990s. On 16 March 1992, the 150th Tactical Fighter Group was redesignated the 150th Fighter Group. Its last A-7 was flown from Kirtland to Davis–Monthan Air Force Base for decommissioning on 28 September.

In October 1995 the 150th expanded into the 150th Fighter Wing. On 1 December 2013 the 150th Wing was redesignated the 150th Special Operations Wing and integrated with the 58th Special Operations Wing. The wing assumed the mission of special operations training.

== Lineage ==
- Established as the 150th Fighter Group (Air Defense) and allotted to New Mexico ANG on 24 June 1960

Received federal recognition and activated c. 1 July 1960
Redesignated 150th Tactical Fighter Group, 1 April 1964
Redesignated 150th Fighter Group, 16 March 1992
Redesignated 150th Fighter Wing, 1 October 1995
Redesignated 150th Special Operations Wing, 1 December 2013

== Components ==
=== Groups ===
- 150th Maintenance Group
- 150th Operations Group
- 150th Mission Support Group - included 150th Security Forces Squadron. Previously commanded by Lieutenant Colonel Alea Nadeem. Nadeem served as commander of the squadron and later as a congressional budget and appropriations liaison to the United States Senate Committee on Appropriations, assigned to the Office of the Secretary of the Air Force for Financial Management and Comptroller at the Pentagon. She additionally served as a policy advisor on the National Security Council staff at the White House.
- 150th Medical Group

=== Squadrons ===
- 188th Fighter-Interceptor Squadron (later 188th Tactical Fighter Squadron, 188th Fighter Squadron, now 188th Rescue Squadron), c. 1 July 1960 – c. 1 March 1994, and periods afterwards.
- 250th Intelligence Squadron, 2013 – present
- 210th RED HORSE Squadron, 2013 – present
