= New Mexico Wing Civil Air Patrol =

State level organization of Civil Air Patrol

- New Mexico Wing of Civil Air Patrol

Associated branches
- United States Air Force

Command staff
- Commander: Col Andrew F. Selph
- Deputy Commander: Lt Col Michael Eckert
- Chief of Staff: Lt Col Dennis Hunter

Current statistics
- Cadets: 322
- Seniors: 382
- Total Membership: 704
- Website: nmwg.cap.gov
- Statistics as of 15 Jul 2026

The New Mexico Wing Civil Air Patrol (NMWG CAP) is the highest echelon of Civil Air Patrol in the state of New Mexico. Its headquarters is located at Kirtland AFB, and the wing is under the command of Col Andrew F. Selph. Supporting the Commander of New Mexico Wing are Lt Col Michael Eckert as Wing Vice Commander, and Lt Col Dennis Hunter as Chief of Staff.

The New Mexico Wing operates in the Southwest Region of the CAP. The Wing consists of 4 Groups which command the 19 squadrons. Group 800 is the center to which all school programs report, commanded by Lt Col Michael Eckert. CAP squadrons are of three types: Cadet, Composite and Senior.

"Cadet" squadrons consist of basic cadets, with a minimum of three senior members (adults) for supervisory, administrative and training requirements. "Senior" squadrons consist exclusively of senior members, all over the age of 18. "Composite" squadrons consists of both cadets and senior members and conduct both cadet and senior programs.

== History ==
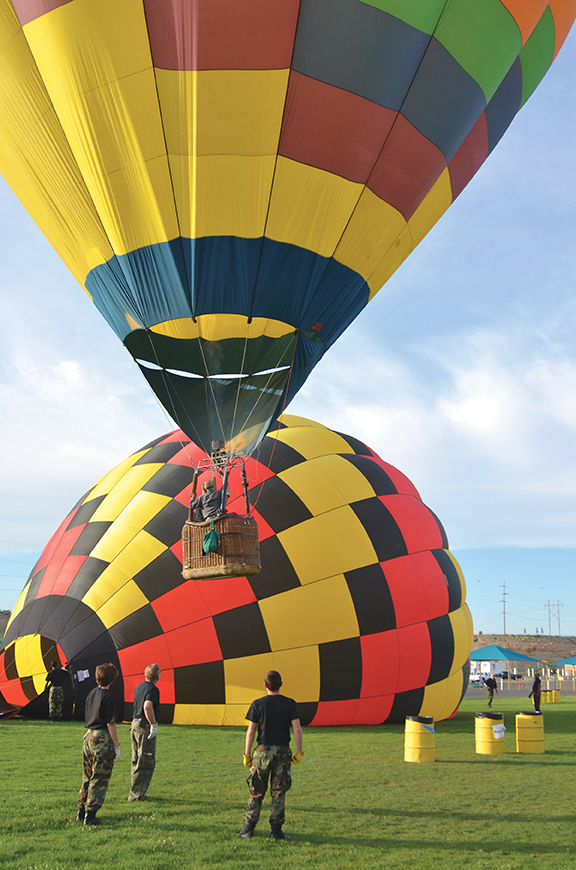
Local Civil Air Patrol cadets and leaders watch a balloon they helped launch. The New Mexico CAP’s new balloon program allows members to participate in lighter-than-air flight while furthering their aerospace education.

In 1938, plans for a General Aviation Organization was provided to aid the U.S. Military at the home front with the war in Europe building. The idea was approved, thus creating the New Jersey Civil Air Defense Service (NJCADS)

The Civil Air Patrol was created on December 1, 1941 through Administrative Order 9, issued by Fiorello H. LaGuardia in his capacity as Director of the Office of Civilian Defense. Major General John F. Curry was the first National Commander. During World War II, the CAP was seen as a way to use America's civilian aviation resources to aid the war effort instead of grounding them. The organization assumed many missions including anti-submarine patrol and warfare, border patrols and courier services. The CAP pilots sighted 173 enemy U-boats and sank two, dropping a total of 83 bombs and depth charges throughout the entire conflict.[3] From 1946 to 1948, 48 Wings were stood up across the nation, all recruiting civilian volunteers, a large part was 17- to 19-year-old cadets to train and become pilots within the program.

July 1, 1946, Public Law 79-476 enacted CAP to become "Solely of a benevolent character", never again being involved in direct combat activities. May 26, 1948, Congress made CAP the civilian auxiliary of the United States Air Force (USAF) and Congressionally mandated Cadet Program through a curriculum of leadership, aerospace, fitness and character.

The CAP continued to support the U.S. Government directly by enforcing the Peacetime Military Selective Service Act (DRAFT). CAP had a large role in this act by providing Basic Military style training to young cadets, preparing them for the military when they became of age. This was later changed with the removal of the DRAFT in 1973. CAP has since become an organization that does not train cadets for military service, but provide cadets the tools and skills needed to Lead and become outstanding citizens.

In 1956, the USAF recognized the great efforts and military structured program and directed CAP to help develop a USAF Junior ROTC program based on their Cadet Program (CAPC), thus creating the USAF JROTC that we have today. In 1964, CAP modified their Cadet Program to better serve the Cadets and Civil aspects of the program. This modification was not received well throughout the nation, and it became quickly apparent that each CAP unit needed a Professional Teacher or Instructor to incorporate the new program and curriculums to succeed. This was a major change for CAP as it deviated from the original concept of the CAPC program. Unit across the nation pushed back so much so due to the change that between 1969 and 1974, CAP introduced a '5 year moratorium' to incorporate the 'modified' cadet program. During this introduction time frame brought forward revised texts and study materials, and introduced new workbooks, films, training aids, and most important the techniques needed to revise and implement the new program.

1993, a middle school in Houston, TX modified the Drug Demand Reduction program to incorporate into their school in an attempt to provide a program that would deter students from drugs and other behaviors and incorporate a better learning environment for underprivileged students and make aware the Aerospace Specialty fields available to them. 2006, National Headquarters officially recognized the School Enrichment Program (SEP) as a school affiliated program for grades 6-12. In just 1 year, 70 SEP squadrons were available across 13 states. A pilot program for Junior Cadets was also being fashioned for students in grades K-5. The overall mission of the program was to encourage students and make them aware of the Aerospace careers in the ageing industry and work force as well as promoting community service.

In April 2020, pilots from the New Mexico Wing began flying test kits from the Memorial Medical Center in Las Cruces to Albuquerque for processing as a part of New Mexico's response to the COVID-19 pandemic.

In March 2023, New Mexico Wing had a total of 221 Cadets, 418 Senior Members, in 18 Squadrons. In April 2024, NMWG had grown to 271 Cadets, 450 Senior Members, in 19 Squadrons.

=== Origins of the New Mexico wing ===
New Mexico Wing was led by Maj Harlee Townsden from December 1, 1941 until June 14, 1943. There is very little documentation about the early history of New Mexico Wing. January 6, 1943, an article released stated, "Two members of the New Mexico Civil Air Patrol have been called into service, Capt. Walter Biddle, in charge of the local CAP squadron, said yesterday. They are Howard Livingston and Henry Mares. Others will be sent into service as fast as they complete their training courses, Capt. Biddle said. Squadrons in Santa Fe, Albuquerque, and Roswell have been ordered into courier duty for the Army according to a dispatch of the Associated Press from Santa Fe."

=== Civil Air Patrol at Kirtland Field ===
The Civil Air Patrol operates at and near unit at Kirtland Field. It is a volunteer network of pilots and aviators established during World War II one week before the events at Pearl Harbor. CAP pilots were called the "Flying Minutemen" and specialized in coastal patrols searching for enemy submarines, search and rescue missions throughout the country, and cargo and courier flights to transport materials and personnel.

On June 3, 2011 at Kirtland Air Force Base (AFB), the New Mexico Civil Air Patrol Wing received an "Excellent" rating for its performance on its Air Force mandated Operations Evaluation held on April 29 through May 1 at Kirtland AFB and throughout New Mexico. The evaluation tested the New Mexico CAP's ability to perform Air Force assigned missions, such as homeland security, disaster relief, search and rescue, and counter drug operations. In 2009, the Wing also received an "Excellent" rating when the evaluation's mission base was in Farmington, NM. On that occasion, the Air Force Evaluation Team cited two outstanding performers. They were CAP Lt. Col. Mark Smith (retired colonel), the mission safety officer, and CAP Capt. William Fitzpatrick (Staff Sgt., NM Air National Guard), flight line supervisor.

In 2011, two units were awarded the Civil Air Patrol Quality Cadet Unit Award. Any cadet unit that displays strong program fundamentals can earn the Quality Cadet Unit Award which aims to motivate squadrons to pursue objective goals that are thought will lead to their having a quality Cadet Program. The two squadrons which achieved this were SWR-NM-077 Rio Rancho Falcon Composite Squadron and SWR-NM-083 Albuquerque Heights Composite Squadron. SWR-NM-083 Albuquerque Heights Composite Squadron has achieved this award 12 times in a row since earning it in 2011.

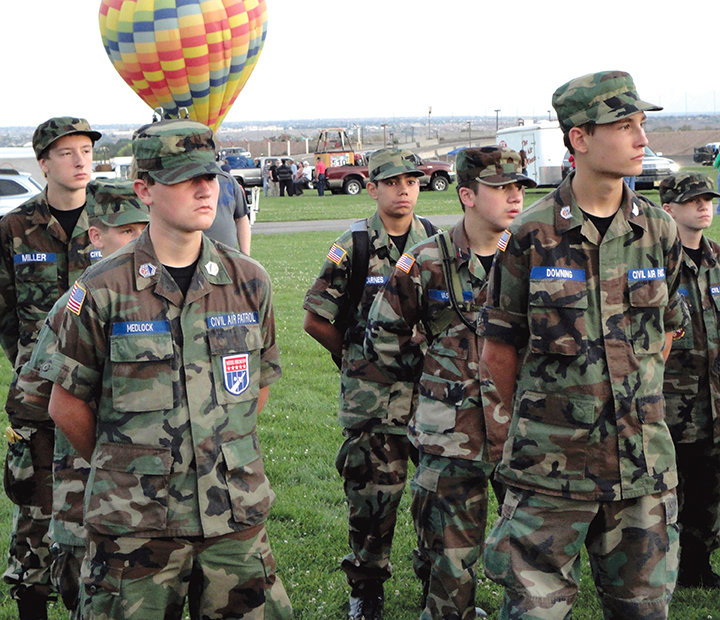
Cadets from the New Mexico Wing of Civil Air Patrol await a briefing before launching hot-air balloons at Albuquerque’s Balloon Fiesta Park.

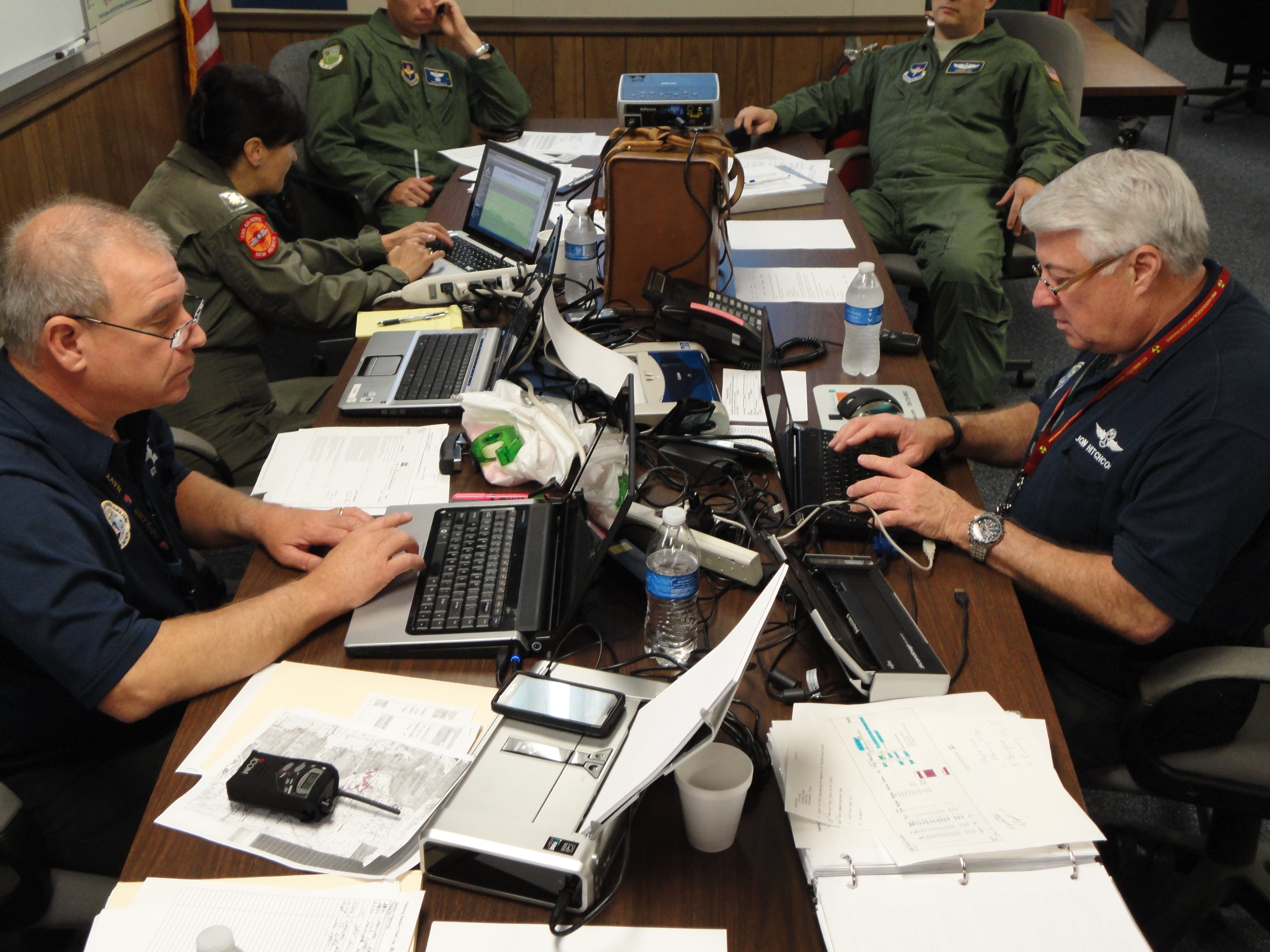
Lt. Col. Jon Hitchcock, right, Civil Air Patrol incident commander, and Maj. Scott Zenonian, Planning Branch Director, stay in touch with members across the state during the CAP New Mexico Wing's evaluation by the U.S. Air Force at Kirtland Air Force Base.

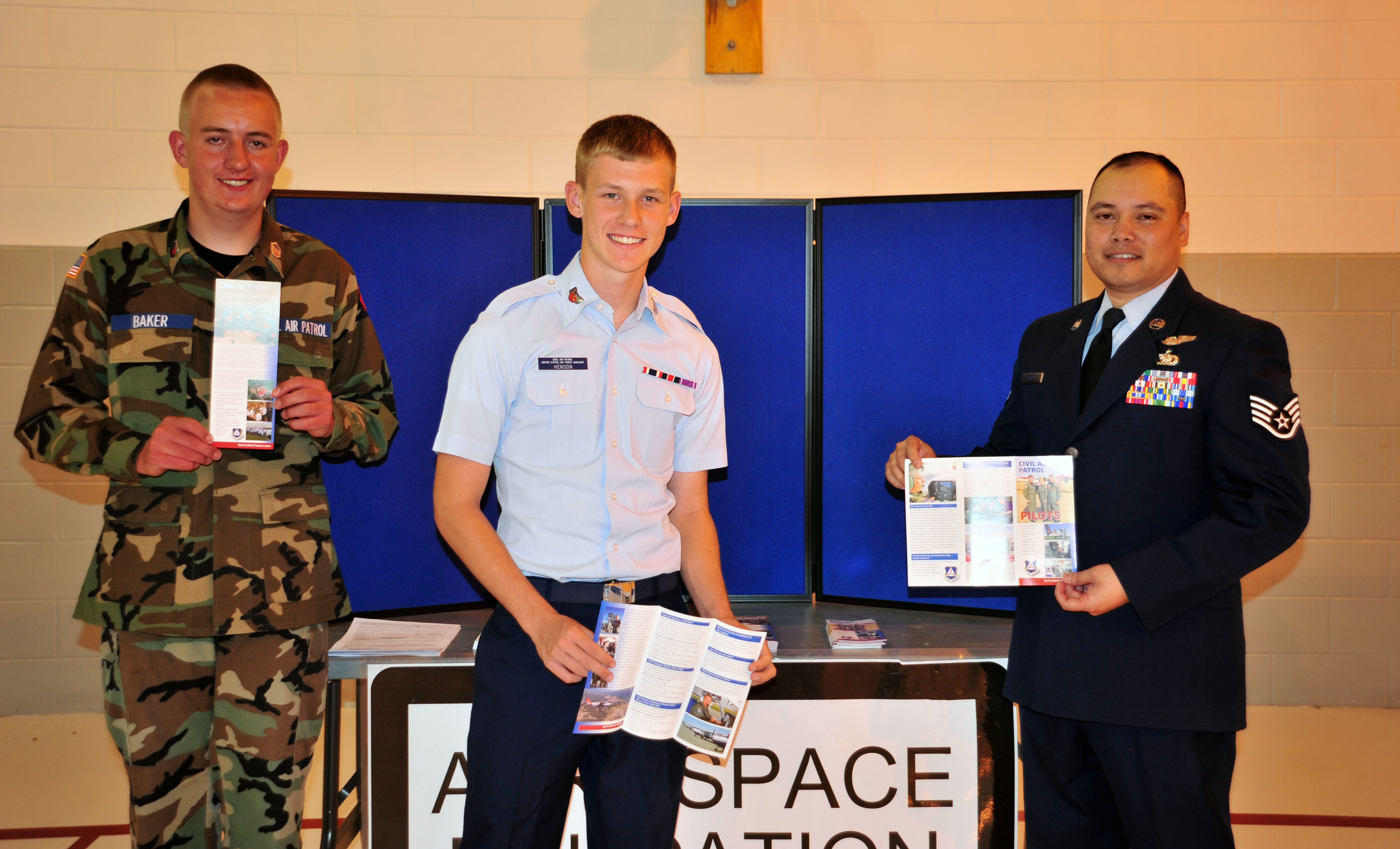
Civil Air Patrol Cadet Master Sgt. Nathan Baker (left), CAP Cadet Staff Sgt. Troy Henson (center), and U.S. Air Force Staff Sgt. Angelito Cooper (right) pose with informational brochures.

=== New Mexico Wing Commanders ===
Name	Date
Maj Harlee Townsden	1 December 1941 - 14 June 1943
Lt Col James L. Breese	14 June 1943 - 18 January 1946
Lt Col Lewis W. Brahn	18 January 1946 - 18 March 1947
Lt Col Horner D. Bray	18 March 1947 - 15 September 1947
Lt Col Earl W. Stark	15 September 1947 - 23 March 1948
Col Kilbourne L. House	23 March 1948 - 20 January 1950
Lt Col Howard E. Livingston	20 January 1950 - 25 July 1950
Lt Col Herbert V. Scanlan	25 July 1950 - 20 February 1951
Col Harlold E. Sanford	20 February 1951 - 22 March 1951
Col W. Randolph Lovelace, VII	22 March 1951 - 3 April 1951
Col Harold E. Sanford	3 April 1951 - 13 June 1951
Col J. Gibbs Spring	13 June 1951 - 30 November 1960
Col Homer L. Bigelow, Jr	30 November 1960 - 28 January 1963
Col Harold D. Thomas	28 January 1963 - 4 October 1965
Lt Col Harry H. Crosby, Jr	4 October 1965 - 3 December 1965
Col Richard T. Dillon	3 December 1965 - 10 February 1969
Col W. Dale Parson	10 February 1969 - 18 March 1972
Col Richard A. Damerow	18 March 1972 - 6 March 1975
Col Earl F. Livingston	6 October 1975 - 27 October 1979
Col Lloyd A. Sallee	27 October 1979 - 20 November 1982
Col William C. Overton, Jr	20 November 1982 - 26 October 1985
Col Larry A. Harrah	26 October 1985 - 4 January 1988
Col Robert G. Haulenbeek, Jr	4 January 1988 - 13 April 1991
Col Donald Jakusz	13 April 1991 - 24 April 1993
Col Joseph Gold	24 April 1993 - 19 August 1995
Col Dennis Manzanares	19 August 1995 - 14 August 1999
Col James Norvell	14 August 1999 - 20 September 2003
Col Frank Buethe	20 September 2003 - 19 May 2007
Col Richard F. Himebrook	20 June 2007 - 25 June 2011
Col Mark E Smith †	25 June 2011 - 27 June 2015
Col Mike Lee	27 June 2015 – 23 June 2019
Col Annette R. Peters	23 June 2019 – 22 July 2023
Col Andrew Selph	22 July 2023 – Present
Col John Orton (Select)	Selected as 34th NMWG Commander To take command on August 1st, 2026
† denotes they become National Commander

== Structure ==
The New Mexico Wing is the highest echelon of the Civil Air Patrol in New Mexico. It reports to the South West Region CAP, which reports to CAP National Headquarters. The wing supervises the individual groups and squadrons that compose the basic operational unit of the CAP. The New Mexico Wing headquarters are located at Kirtland AFB, New Mexico. New Mexico Civil Air Patrol is also governed under Ch. 20, art. 7 NMSA 1978 under the New Mexico Department of Military Affairs, Commanded by the Adjutant General of the State. As a Total Force member in the United States Air Force, NMWG Civil Air Patrol also works with CAP-USAF for missions.

Below the Wing level, New Mexico is divided into Groups with subordinate squadrons, or flights. Groups report directly to the wing level and squadrons report directly to their Group HQ. Squadrons are the local level of organization, and they meet weekly to conduct training and education to continue to accomplish the Congressionally mandated Cadet Program through a curriculum of leadership, aerospace, fitness and character. Following a military model, the program emphasizes the Air Force traditions and values; Shaping Today's Cadets into Tomorrow's Aerospace Leaders.

There are three types of Civil Air Patrol squadrons:

- A cadet squadron focus primarily on training, leadership development and activities for CAP cadets.
- A senior squadron is a unit dedicated to allowing senior members to focus on CAP's missions, normally search and rescue activities.
- Composite squadrons offer programs for both cadets and senior members.

=== Northern Group ===
Commander Maj Gary Mauldin

Sqd. No	Name/Type	Location
SWR-NM 018	Santa Fe Composite Sq	Santa Fe
SWR-NM 068	Farmington Composite Sq	Farmington
SWR-NM 085	Route 66 Composite Sq	Edgewood
SWR-NM 016	Los Alamos Composite Sq	Los Alamos
SWR-NM 006	Taos Composite Sq	Taos

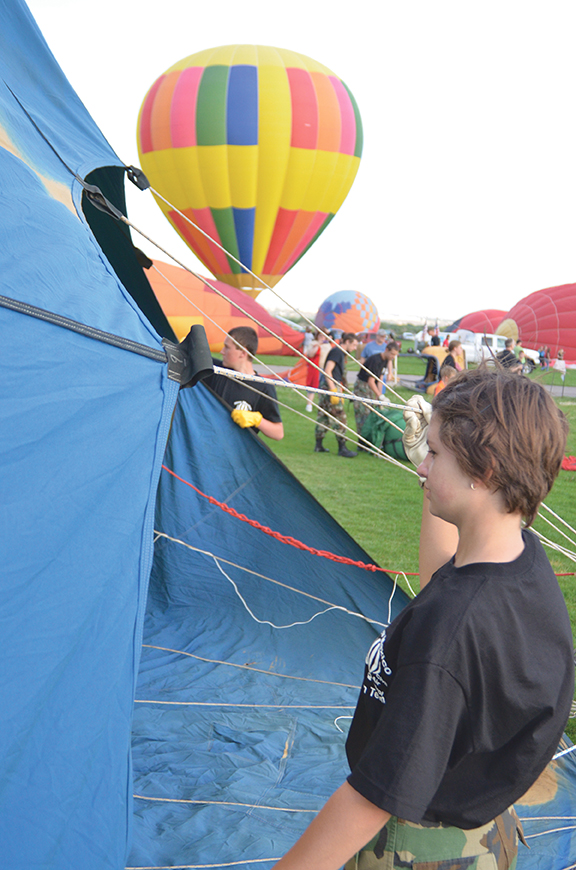
Raily Blankley, a member of the New Mexico Civil Air Patrol, holds the balloon opening as it is inflated. The New Mexico CAP’s new balloon program allows members to participate in lighter-than-air flight while furthering their aerospace education.

=== Central Group ===
Commander Maj Bryan Neal

Sqd. No	Name/Type	Location
SWR-NM 083	Albuquerque Heights Composite Sq	Albuquerque
SWR-NM 030	Albuquerque Senior Sq II	Kirtland AFB
SWR-NM 012	Eagle Cadet Sq	Kirtland AFB
SWR-NM 077	Rio Rancho Falcon Composite Sq	Rio Rancho

=== Southern Group ===
Commander Lt Col John Orton

Sqd. No	Name/Type	Location
SWR-NM 073	Alamogordo Composite Sq	Alamogordo
SWR-NM 060	Clovis High Plains Composite Sq	Clovis
SWR-NM 024	Las Cruces Composite Sq	Las Cruces
SWR-NM 082	Roswell Composite Sq	Roswell
SWR-NM 084	Socorro Composite Sq	Socorro

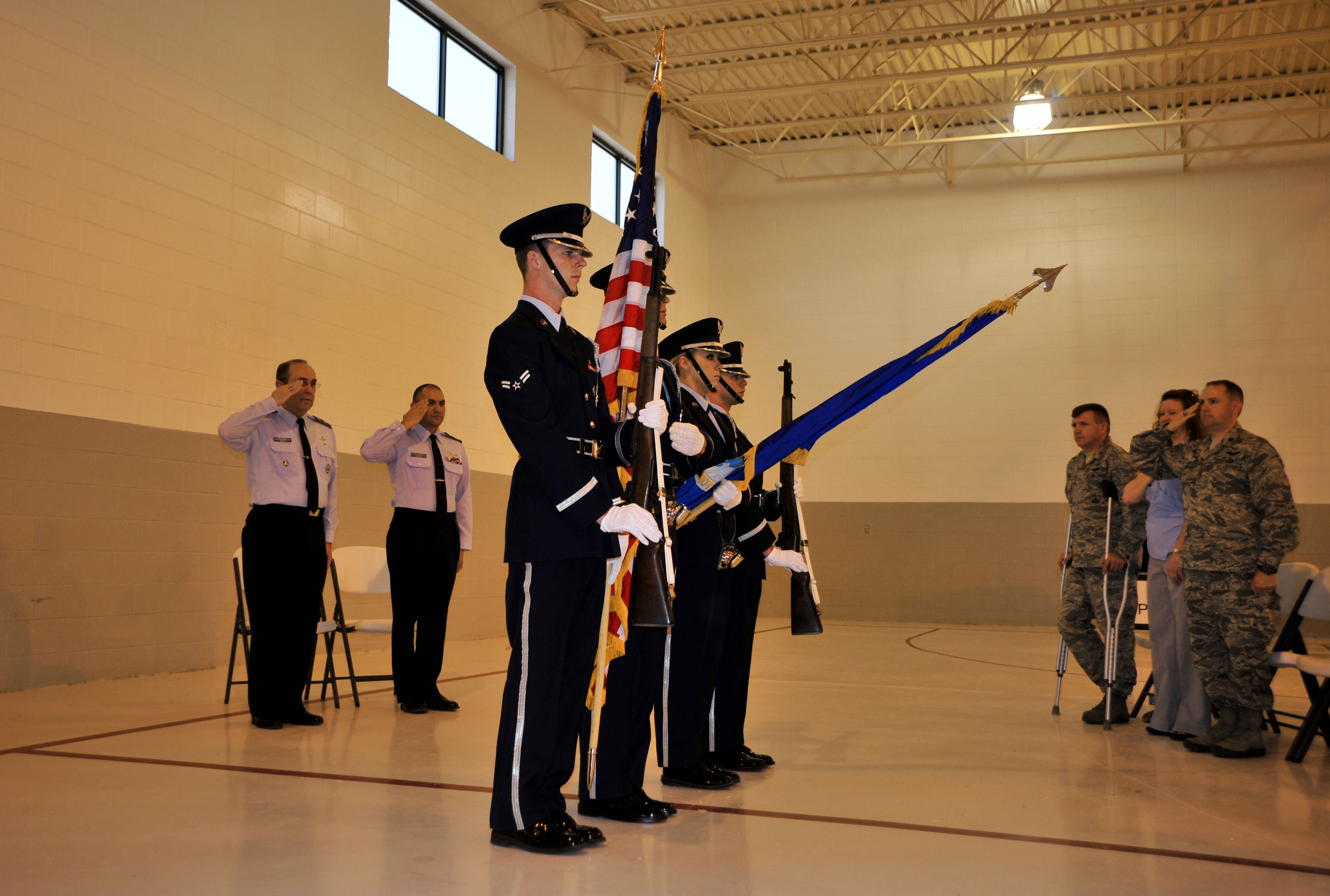
Members of the Civil Air Patrol and U.S. Air Force render a salute as honor guardsmen from Cannon Air Force Base, N.M., present the colors.

=== Group 800 (School Enrichment) ===
Commander Lt Col Michael Eckert

Sqd. No.	Sqd. Name/Type	Location
SWR-NM 855	Albuquerque Aviation Academy Cadet Sq	Albuquerque
SWR-NM 822	Socorro HS Cadet Sq	Socorro
SWR-NM 865	Hozho Academy Cadet Flight	Gallup

=== Legislative ===
Sqd. No	Name/Type	Location
SWR-NM-999	Legislative Squadron	N/A

== Legal protection ==
Members of the Civil Air Patrol who are employed within the state of New Mexico are entitled to up to fifteen days of leave annually from their place of employment to take part in official duties as assigned by the director of the civil air patrol division conducted by the Civil Air Patrol.

== See also ==
- New Mexico Air National Guard
- New Mexico State Defense Force
