= Nebraska Wing Civil Air Patrol =

- Nebraska Wing of Civil Air Patrol

Associated branches
- United States Air Force

Command staff
- Commander: Col David E. Plum
- Deputy Commander: Lt Col Roxann Richards
- Chief of Staff: Lt Col Jason Ferguson

Current statistics
- Cadets: 187
- Seniors: 214
- Total Membership: 401
- Website: www.newg.cap.gov//
- Statistics as of April, 2025

The Nebraska Wing of Civil Air Patrol (CAP) is the highest echelon of Civil Air Patrol in the state of Nebraska. Nebraska Wing headquarters are located in North Platte, Nebraska. The Nebraska Wing consists of over 400 cadet and adult members at over 12 locations across the state of Nebraska.

== Mission ==
The Nebraska Wing performs the three missions of Civil Air Patrol: providing emergency services; offering cadet programs for youth; and providing aerospace education for both CAP members and the general public.

=== Emergency services ===
Civil Air Patrol provides emergency services to those in distress. This includes executing federal inland search-and-rescue missions directed by the Air Force Rescue Coordination Center. Civil Air Patrol assets are also available to state and local emergency management and Public Safety agencies for search and rescue operations, aerial photography missions, contingency tactical communications, and emergency transport of humanitarian supplies, blood, tissue, or organs.

=== Cadet programs ===
Civil Air Patrol offers a cadet program for youth aged 12 to 21, which includes aerospace education, leadership training, physical fitness and moral leadership. The cadet program includes an opportunity for cadets to solo fly an airplane through a flight encampment or academy. The Nebraska Wing's Cadet Programs is aided by an endowment fund of $1,025,000. This was gifted to the CAP Foundation in 2019 by a former Civil Air Patrol cadet who stated "Civil Air Patrol has been such a significant part of my life, starting when I was a cadet. I've been fortunate to do well within my career and to be able to make this investment in the Civil Air Patrol Foundation, to specifically support the Nebraska Wing, both now and in the future."

=== Aerospace education ===
Civil Air Patrol provides aerospace education to CAP members and the general public. For CAP members, this includes graded courses covering flight physics, dynamics, history, and application. Civil Air Patrol helps schoolteachers integrate aviation and aerospace into the classroom through outreach programs, including the External Aerospace Education program, by providing seminars, course materials and through sponsorship of the National Congress on Aviation and Space Education.

== Organization ==
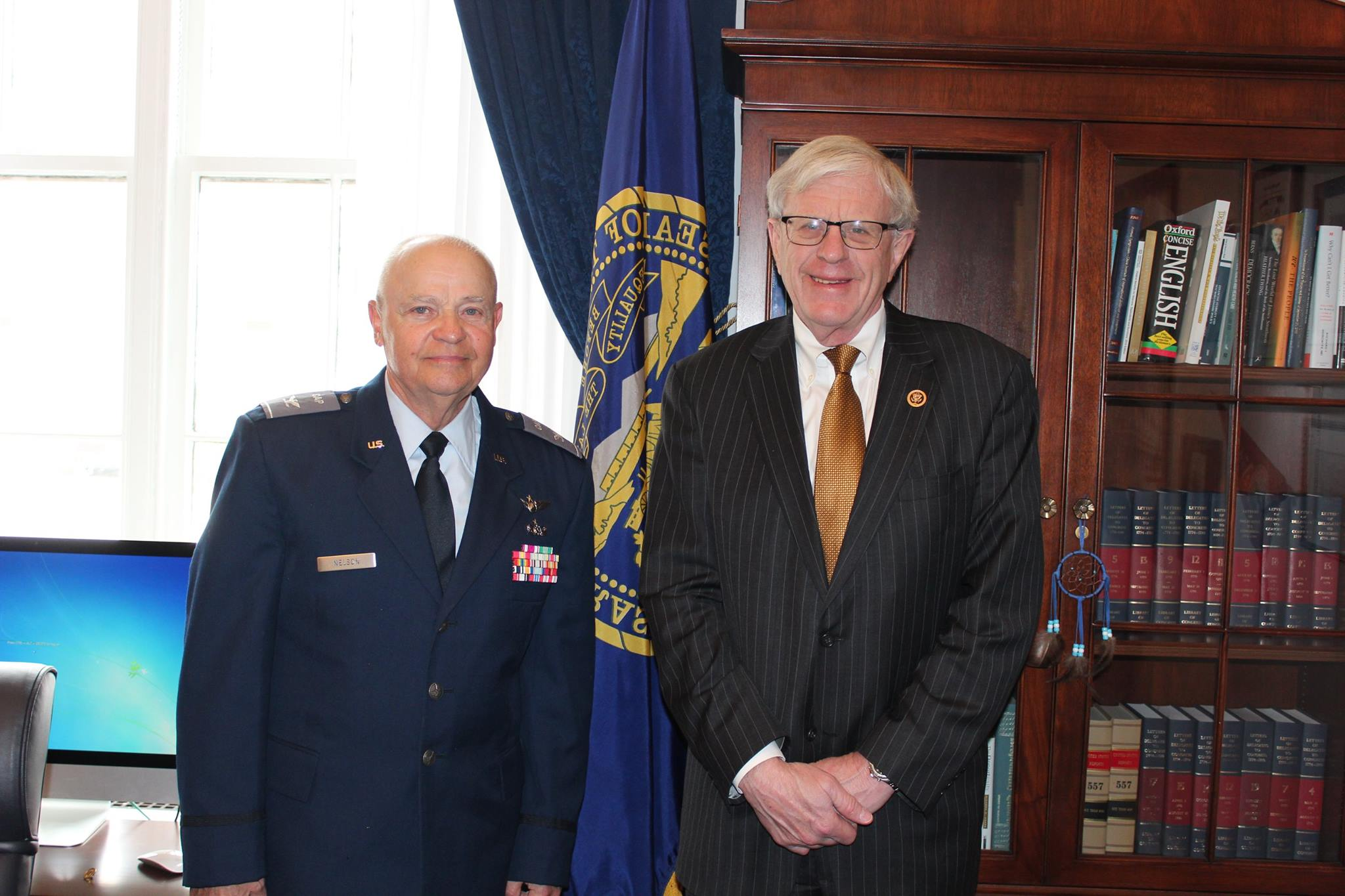
Commander Darrell Nelson from the Nebraska Wing Civil Air Patrol and Former Congressman Brad Ashford.

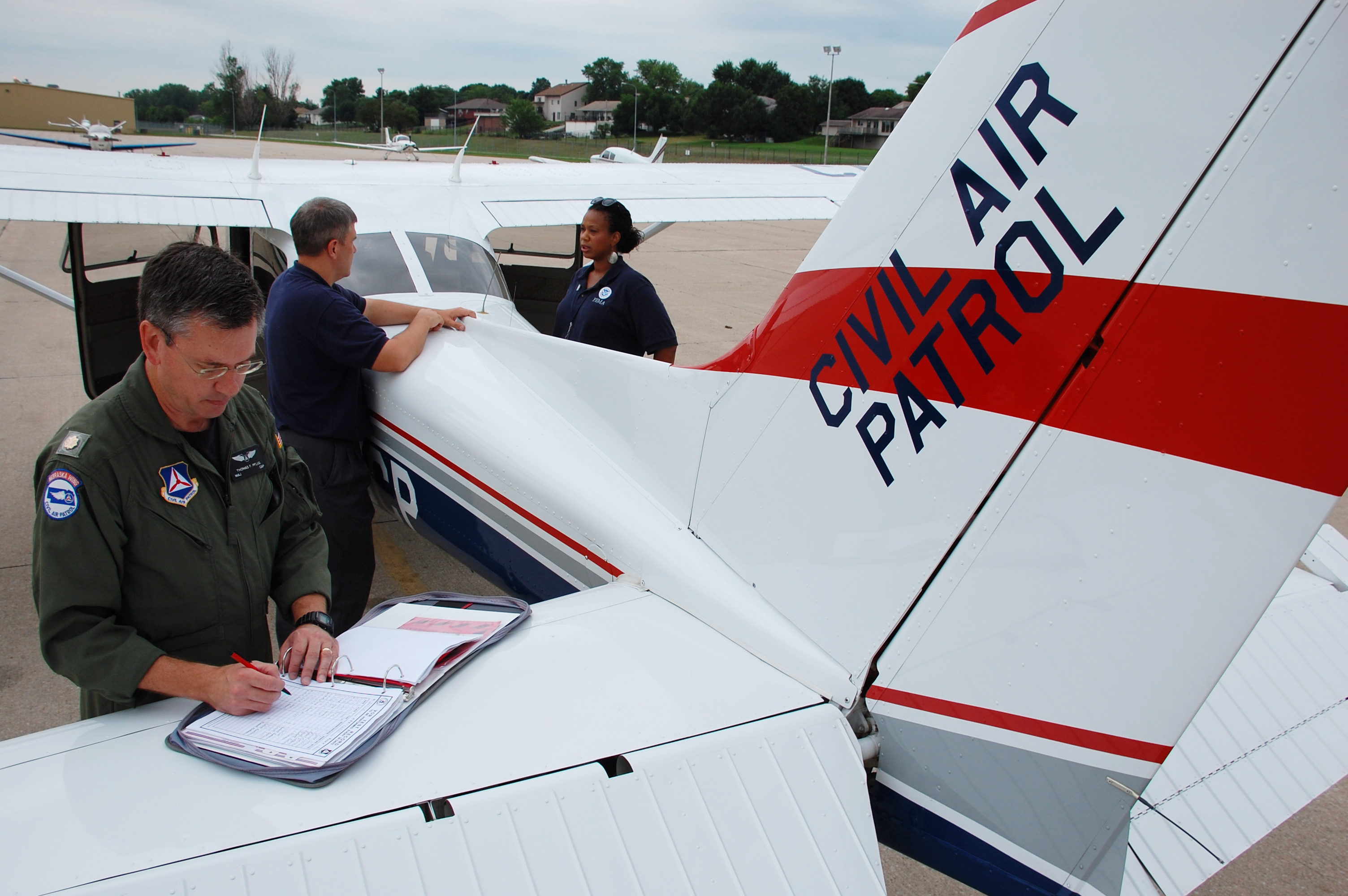
Civil Air Patrol pilot Tom Pflug checks his flight log as CAP photographer Erich Deitenbeck discusses the days photo opportunities with FEMA's Natasha Wilkins.

Units of the Nebraska Wing
Designation	Unit Name	Location	Commander
NCR-NE-001	Nebraska Wing Headquarters	North Platte	Col David Plum
NCR-NE-002	General Curtis Lemay Offutt Composite Squadron	Offutt AFB	Capt Leonard LaPorte
NCR-NE-004	Columbus Composite Squadron	Columbus	Lt Col Leonard Cassell
NCR-NE-010	Fremont Cadet Squadron	Fremont	1st Lt Eric L Martinson
NCR-NE-019	Omaha Composite Squadron	Omaha	Maj John Pineda
NCR-NE-058	155th Composite Squadron	Lincoln	1st Lt Charles E Burchess
NCR-NE-068	Capital City Senior Flight	Lincoln	1st Lt Jerry Arnold
NCR-NE-073	High Plains Composite Flight	Valentine	Capt Charles Moe
NCR-NE-089	99th Pursuit Composite Squadron	Omaha	Lt Col Jeffrey S Michalski
NCR-NE-093	Lee Bird Composite Squadron	North Platte	1st Lt Cassidy E Arizona
NCR-NE-094	Tri-Cities Flight	Grand Island	1st Lt Brandon Zimmermann
NCR-NE-800	Burke High School Flight	Omaha	Capt Melanie Boudreault
NCR-NE-999	Nebraska State Legislative Squadron	Lincoln	1st Lt Kevin D Cory

== See also ==
- Awards and decorations of Civil Air Patrol
- Nebraska Air National Guard
- Nebraska State Guard
