= Ncase =

Ncase may refer to:

- National Congress on Aviation and Space Education (NCASE), annual conference sponsored by Civil Air Patrol
- Nicky Case, a Canadian indie game developer known as Ncase
- ncase, application by Zango (company) (formerly known as 180solutions)
