= L-Tronics =

L-Tronics was a company based in Santa Barbara, California that specialized in the design and manufacture of direction finding (DF) equipment for search and rescue applications, used to locate signals originating from emergency locator beacons. These include Emergency Locator Transmitters (ELTs) used by aircraft, Emergency Position Indicator Radio Beacons (EPIRBs) used by marine vehicles, and Personal Locator Beacons (PLBs). One major operator of L-Tronics devices is the Civil Air Patrol.

== Little L-Per ==
The L-Tronics Little L-Per, more commonly known as L-Per, was a line of portable, compact folding DF receivers made by the L-Tronics company. The receivers in the Little L-Per line are the LH-16 (now discontinued) and the newer LL-16 models.

=== LH-16 ===
The LH-16 was the first in the series of the Little L-Per line, and has now been discontinued, having been replaced by the LL-16 model. It uses a two-element yagi antenna, with a crystal oscillator-controlled double-conversion receiver, and may be attached to antennas for external use on aircraft or vehicles.

On the face of the device there is

- A left-right dial for signal strength (Receive Mode) or signal direction (DF Mode)
- An audio speaker for auditory confirmation of the distress beacon's distinct signal
- A mode selector switch to turn the LH-16 on DF or Receive Mode, or off
- A volume knob for the audio
- A sensitivity knob
- A radio frequency select knob
- A dial light switch

Since the device relies on internal crystal oscillators for receiving frequencies, channels can be changed by replacing crystals.

Units were manufactured for use on aircraft, marine, and amateur radio frequency bands. VHF and Dual band VHF/UHF units were also available.

The LH-16 has the ability to switch between two modes: DF and Receive. In DF mode, the direction of the needle on the dial indicates the direction the operator needs to turn in order to face the direction of the signal. For example, if the operator needs to turn to the right to face the signal, the needle will point to the right, and if the operator is facing the signal, the needle will be centered. Care needs to be taken in this mode to ensure that one is not facing the opposite direction of the signal, as in this case the needle will also be centered. In Receive mode, the needle indicates signal strength 90 degrees to the left of the device. Either or both modes may be used in operating this device, depending upon operator's preference and the needs of the search. Often, the operator will use DF to find two options for signal, and receive to find out which of the two directions the operator needs to follow.

=== LL-16 ===
The LL-16 was the newest model in the Little L-Per line. It has been out of production and not available for purchase since mid 2015. It features numerous improvements over the LH-16, including built-in handle and stainless steel antennas. The LL-16 incorporates a transreflective liquid crystal display which improves readability under most ambient light conditions. In addition, instead of two separate modes for signal strength and signal direction, both are displayed simultaneously. The plastic casing floats and is waterproof for up to ten feet, and is designed for up to 15,000 feet altitude. Instead of the two 9V batteries used in the LH-16, the LL-16 employs six of the more commonly available 1.5V alkaline, NiMh, NiCd, or lithium-ion AA batteries.

Operation of the LL-16 is similar to that of the LH-16, and its design ensures that operators familiar with the LH-16 may transfer to the newer unit without additional training or significant familiarization. However, instead of separate Receive and DF modes as on the LH-16, the LL-16 displays both signal strength to the unit's left and signal direction simultaneously. This feature makes the device easier to use. The same external antennas that are used on the LH-16 may also be employed on the LL-16, allowing for use in aircraft and vehicles.

== LA Series Aircraft DF ==
The LA Series Aircraft DF receiver was an independent crystal-controlled receiver designed for permanent installation into an aircraft. The LA system integrates with the aircraft's radio stack, and utilizes a set of external antennas. The unit has two dials on the face; one dial indicates signal strength and the other dial indicates signal direction (comparable to the receive and DF modes on the LH-16, respectively). Production of these units is now discontinued.

== Monitor receivers ==
L-Tronics made a line of receiver models that generate an alert when they receive an ELT signal. Base station units are used to generate an audible alert in an area where people are present. "Mountain top" units are used to generate an alert signal over a monitored radio communications network, and are usually placed in remote locations such as repeater sites. Production of these units is now discontinued.

== Accessories and repair ==
L-Tronics provided accessories for their devices, including replacement parts, antennas, crystal oscillators, and external power connectors. L-Tronics also provided a factory repair service on all equipment and accessories

== See also ==
- Radio direction finder
- Signals intelligence
