= Margaret Bartholomew =

American female air pilot

- Born: October 8, 1903
- Died: October 18, 1943 (aged 40) Indiana, Pennsylvania
- Buried: Spring Grove Cemetery, Cincinnati, OH
- Allegiance: United States of America
- Branch: Civil Air Patrol
- Rank: Lieutenant Civil Air Patrol

Margaret Bartholomew (October 8, 1903 – October 18, 1943) was the first, and only female, Civil Air Patrol member to die in service during World War II.

== Biography ==
Lieutenant Margaret Bartholomew was the 154th charter member of the Ohio Wing of Civil Air Patrol, as well as being the Flight Leader of Flight C from Squadron 5111-1. Squadron 5111-1 was the original Cincinnati Squadron, and was based at Lunken Airport. Flight C was an all-female flight, and was composed of 50 pilots.

Bartholomew was returning to Cincinnati on October 18, 1943, from a courier mission out of Williamsport, Pennsylvania, when a sudden snowstorm plunged visibility to zero. She flew lower as she tried to find a safe place to land, but visibility was so poor that she crashed into a hill 55 miles northeast of Pittsburgh, approximately in Indiana, Pennsylvania.

=== Burial ===
Bartholomew is buried at Spring Grove Cemetery, Cincinnati, Ohio in Section 124, Lot 170.
