= Nebraska State Guard =

- Active: 1942-1947; 1968-1972
- Country: United States
- Allegiance: Nebraska
- Branch: Army
- Type: State defense force
- Role: Military reserve force

Commanders
- Civilian Leadership During World War II: Governor Dwight Griswold Governor Val Peterson
- Civilian Leadership During the Vietnam War: Governor Norbert T. Tiemann Governor J. James Exon
- Military Leadership During the Vietnam War: Colonel Henry G. Jacoby

The Nebraska State Guard (NSG) is the currently inactive state defense force of the state of Nebraska, which was activated during both World War II and the Vietnam War. As a state defense force, the NSG served on as a component of the organized militia of Nebraska, serving as reservists who trained periodically but could be called up during an emergency; however, unlike the Nebraska National Guard, the Nebraska State Guard could not be federalized or deployed outside the state. Rather, when the National Guard was deployed, the purpose of the State Guard was to assume the stateside duties of the National Guard.

== History of Predecessor Units ==
Both the National Guard and the various state defense forces trace their roots to organized militia units which composed the majority of American military forces before the creation of the modern National Guard under the Militia Act of 1903. The first organized militia, the Nebraska Volunteers, was a division-sized unit of volunteers created by an act of the Nebraska Territorial Legislature in 1856. Nebraska later created several multiple units during the American Civil War.

== World War II ==
Following the American entrance into World War II and federalization of all National Guard units, numerous states created state defense forces in order to protect their territory against invasion, unrest, insurrection, and sabotage while their National Guard units were deployed. Nebraska created the Nebraska State Guard in 1942. In April 1943, the Nebraska State Guard was deployed alongside federal Army soldiers and civilian volunteers to assist in protecting the Omaha Municipal Airport from floodwater during a flood of the Missouri River. The Nebraska State Guard was disbanded in 1947, though the statutes authorizing it remained in effect.

== Vietnam War ==
Due to the heightened chance of deployment for several National Guard units chosen to be a part of the Selected Reserve Force during the Vietnam War, Governor Norbert T. Tiemann reactivated Nebraska's state defense force in 1968 to replace the Nebraska National Guard. The Nebraska State Guard was organized at a cadre level, with plans to expand through four phases and ultimately reach a full strength of roughly 4,000 men; however, due to the repeal of the Selected Reserve Force program, the Vietnam-era State Guard never expanded beyond a cadre of approximately 220 officers and enlisted men, primarily veterans of World War II or the Vietnam War, organized across 35 units in 30 towns. The Nebraska State Guard was then disbanded in 1972.

=== Uniform ===
The Vietnam-era uniform for State Guardsmen, provided by the state, consisted of an army uniform with the federal patch replaced with a State Guard shoulder patch instead of the American flag, a pair of boots, and an “N.S.G.” brass insignia for the uniform's collar for officers.

== Legal status ==
State defense forces are given a legal basis by the federal government under Title 32, Section 109 of the United States Code. Currently, 23 states and the territory of Puerto Rico maintain active state defense forces. Nebraska law also recognizes the Nebraska State Guard as a military entity which can be reactivated by the Governor of Nebraska whenever any part of the National Guard of the State of Nebraska is in active federal service, whenever the president of the United States declares a national emergency, or whenever an emergency is declared by the governor. Therefore, the legal framework exists at both state and federal levels to reactivate the Nebraska State Guard in the future should these conditions be met.

== See also ==
- Nebraska Wing Civil Air Patrol
