= Montana Wing Civil Air Patrol =

Highest echelon of Montana Civil Air Patrol

- Montana Wing of Civil Air Patrol

Associated branches
- United States Air Force

Command staff
- Commander: Col. Matthew Bolin
- Deputy Commander: Maj. Erik Eichner
- Chief of Staff: Vacant

Current statistics
- Cadets: 180
- Seniors: 197
- Total Membership: 378
- Website: mtwg.cap.gov
- Statistics as of November 2024

The Montana Wing of Civil Air Patrol (CAP) is the highest echelon of Civil Air Patrol in the state of Montana. Montana Wing headquarters are located on Malmstrom Air Force Base in Great Falls, Montana. The Montana Wing consists of nearly 400 cadet and adult members across the state of Montana.

== Mission ==
Established in 1941, Civil Air Patrol is the official auxiliary of the U.S. Air Force and as such is a member of its Total Force. In its auxiliary role, CAP operates a fleet of 560 single-engine Cessna aircraft and 1,550 small Unmanned Aircraft Systems (sUAS) and performs about 90% of continental U.S. inland search and rescue missions as tasked by the Air Force Rescue Coordination Center. Often using innovative cellphone forensics and radar analysis software, CAP was credited by the AFRCC with saving 110 lives in fiscal 2019. CAP's 66,000 members also perform homeland security, disaster relief and drug interdiction missions at the request of federal, state and local agencies. As a nonprofit organization, CAP plays a leading role in aerospace education using national academic standards-based STEM (science, technology, engineering and math) education. Members also serve as mentors to over 28,000 young people participating in CAP's Cadet Programs. One of the premier public service organizations in America, CAP benefits the nation with an estimated economic impact of $209 million annually.

=== Emergency services ===
Providing emergency services includes performing search and rescue and disaster relief missions; as well as assisting in humanitarian aid assignments. The CAP also provides Air Force support through conducting light transport, communications support, and low-altitude route surveys. Civil Air Patrol can also provide support to counter-drug missions.

=== Cadet programs ===
The CAP offers cadet programs for youth aged 12 to 21. Cadets receive training in aerospace education, leadership, physical fitness and moral leadership.

=== Aerospace education ===
The CAP offers aerospace education for CAP members as well as the general public. This education is provided by offering training to the cadet members of CAP, and also by offering workshops for youth throughout the nation through schools and public aviation events.

== Organization ==
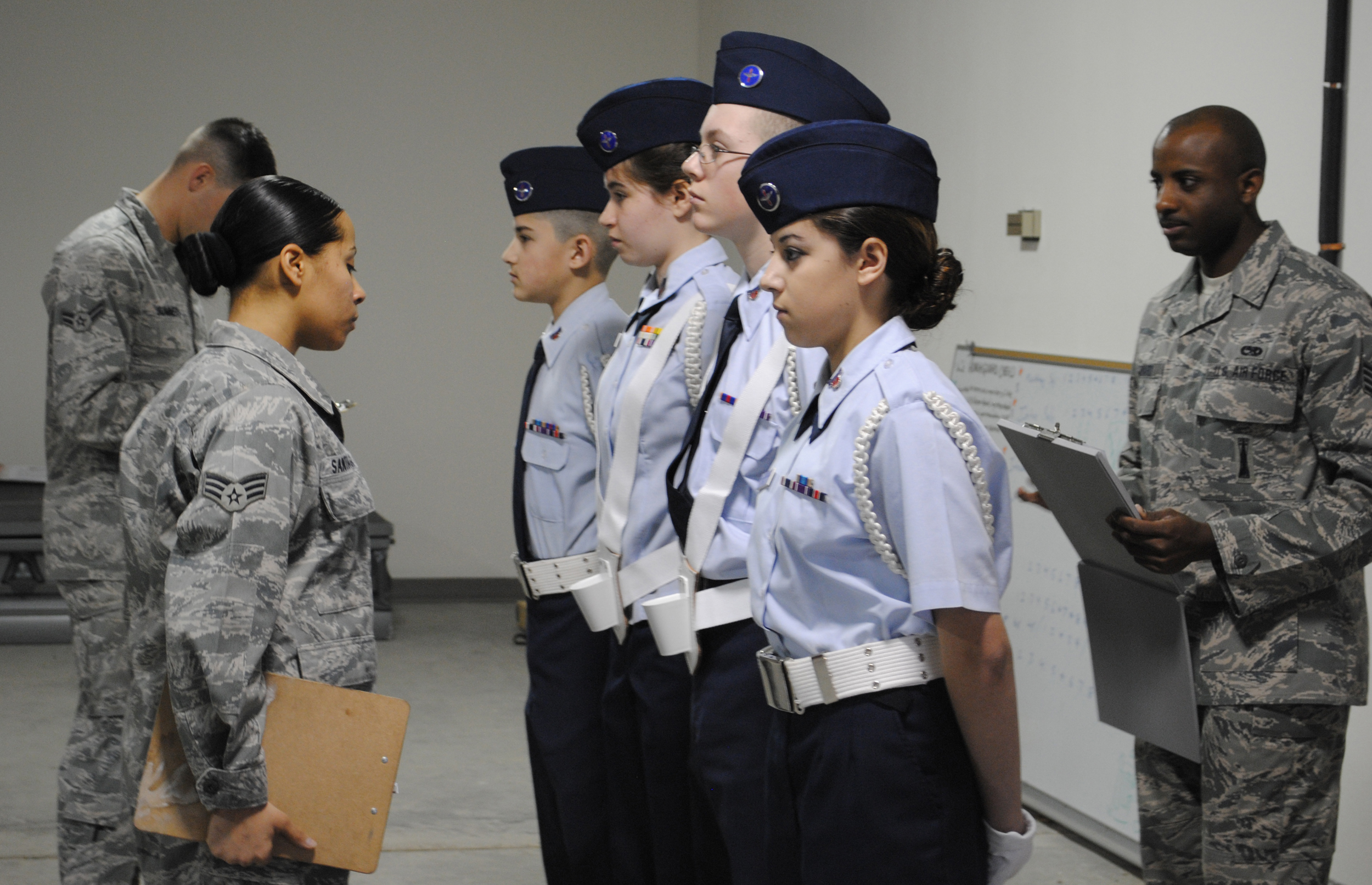
Members of Malmstrom's Honor Guard served as the judges for the Malmstrom Civil Air Patrol six-part evaluation.

Squadrons of the Montana Wing
| Designation | Squadron Name | Location | More info. |
|---|---|---|---|
| RMR-MT-008 | Beartooth Composite Squadron | Billings | Meeting info. and unit contact |
| RMR-MT-012 | Malmstrom AFB Composite Squadron | Great Falls | Meeting info. and unit contact |
| RMR-MT-018 | Grizzly Composite Squadron | Missoula | Meeting info. and unit contact |
| RMR-MT-031 | Butte Composite Squadron | Butte | Meeting info. and unit contact |
| RMR-MT-037 | Gallatin Composite Squadron | Bozeman | Meeting info. and unit contact |
| RMR-MT-053 | Flathead Composite Squadron | Kalispell | Meeting info. and unit contact |
| RMR-MT-060 | Lewis and Clark Composite Squadron | Helena/Fort Harrison | Meeting info. and unit contact |
| RMR-MT-999 | Montana State Legislative Squadron | Helena | |

== See also ==
- Awards and decorations of Civil Air Patrol
- Fort William Henry Harrison
- Malmstrom Air Force Base
- Montana Air National Guard
