= Nebraska National Guard =

Military units

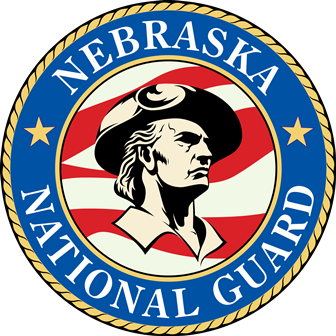
Nebraska National Guard logo

The Nebraska National Guard consists of the:

- Nebraska Army National Guard
- Nebraska Air National Guard

== See also ==
- Nebraska State Guard
