= National Blue Beret =

National Cadet Special Activity in the Civil Air Patrol

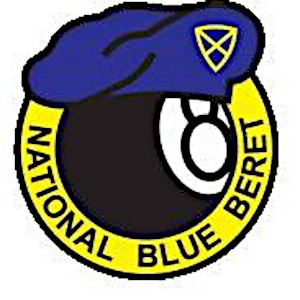
- The National Blue Beret patch, worn by cadets who graduated.
- United States

Information
- Motto: Mission First, People Always.
- Established: 1967
- Color: Blue
- Affiliations: Civil Air Patrol

National Blue Beret (NBB) is a National Cadet Special Activity in the US Civil Air Patrol. The event is two weeks long and is set up so that the second week will overlap with the annual EAA AirVenture Oshkosh event in Wisconsin, United States. Participants are Civil Air Patrol cadet and senior members who must go through a competitive national selection process in order to attend the event. Participants help conduct event operations, including flight marshaling, crowd control, and emergency services.

== Contributions to EAA AirVenture ==
The most important mission of the program is to assist the EAA with flight marshaling operations on the taxiways around runway 27. Cadets maintain constant posts along the taxiways near one runway during all operational hours of the air show. One group of 10-12 cadets, called a "flight," is stationed at various points on the taxiway and is responsible for directing pilots to their destinations.

The second mission of the program is to provide the EAA with personnel to handle crowd control at the ultralight field and the warbirds parking area. Due to the cost of many of the warbirds, access to them is limited, and only viewing is permitted. One flight at a time maintains a perimeter to keep the crowds from approaching the aircraft.

The third mission of the program is emergency services, which entails locating and silencing any Emergency Locator Transmitters (ELTs) that are transmitting at any point during the event. Senior members handle the logistical and administrative components of emergency services at the air show. During operational hours, they staff the communication post and have several vehicles at their disposal for use in tracking down the ELTs. Cadets aid the senior members by taking control of the radio shack during their shifts and handling signaling hardware with the vehicles. Cadets also staff two stations to observe aircraft landing on each runway, in order to keep track of which aircraft are on the ground.

== Structure of the event ==
All cadets are split up into flights for the event. Each flight consists of 10-12 cadets, a flight commander, and a flight leader, who is considered the civilian equivalent a flight sergeant (but is obviously not an NCO). Each flight is also assigned a senior member to serve as a Training Officer. The Training Officer accompanies the flight on all shifts and serves as a liaison between the flight and senior members of the chain of command.

The program is divided into two phases, each lasting one week.

1. The first week is considered a training phase. All participants are introduced to the flight and runway environment and receive the necessary training for their duties in the second phase. The training includes flight marshaling, mission radio operator qualifications, and extensive training on techniques for locating ELT signals.
2. The second week is focused on operations, and each flight has a daily schedule in which they alternate between shifts on and off the compound. During this week flights are also allotted certain times to see the airshow.

== Logistics ==
Operations are based out of the "compound" that includes a hangar for sleeping, a field for opening and closing formations, a communications shack, and a mess hall. The compound is run entirely by CAP personnel, and both cadets and senior members aid in all tasks required for maintenance and daily operations. These tasks include kitchen work, cleaning, maintaining a 24-hour staffed post at the entrance and exit gates for logs, doing nightly laundry for all participants, and any other general maintenance work that needs to be performed.

== Tradition ==
CAP National Blue Beret awarded at graduation to cadets who complete the program.

The most famous tradition of the event is for cadets and seniors to receive a blue beret towards the end of the event. The blue beret is authorized for wear on the Airman Battle Uniform, OCP, or CAP Corporate Field Uniform by CAPR 39-1 while attending the National Blue Beret activity or at their home squadron or group's activities. Though the beret is considered to be the most widely known symbol of NBB, it is actually considered by attendees to be less important than the emblem that is pinned on the beret. When participants receive the blue beret, they also receive a pin of Saint Alban's Cross that is pinned onto the beret.

From the Blue Beret website:

St. Alban was a monk, who was a martyr in medieval times. He was put to death for giving a condemned man his cloak. A man who was willing to give everything, including his life, for his fellow man. This is the same feeling and dedication felt by all Blue Berets.

The crest is in the shape of a shield, representing the mission of the Blue Berets as "protectors" of human life, their strength in adversity, and the military heritage of the organization. The crest design is a gold cross superimposed on a dark blue background. The crest is worn on the beret, centered over the left eye.
