= Satellite digital imaging system =

System for transmission of images from an aircraft in flight

The satellite digital imaging system (SDIS) is a simple system composed of commercial off-the-shelf (COTS) hardware and custom integration software, which allows the operator to transmit digital photos from an aircraft in flight to a ground station. It is currently used by the United States Civil Air Patrol (CAP) for domestic search and rescue operations and commercial photography.

== Components ==
- Nikon D100 digital SLR camera.
- Panasonic Toughbook laptop computer with SDIS software installed.
- Satellite telephone.

The SDIS consists essentially of connecting these three devices to one another. No hardware is physically installed in the aircraft.

== Operation ==
Prior to takeoff, the operator connects the laptop to the web mission information reporting system (WMIRS) and obtains a mission identifier. During flight, photos are downloaded to the laptop computer and e-mailed to the customer or CAP base using the satellite phone. Images are also captured to a memory card in the digital camera, and may be edited or uploaded to the WMIRS after landing.

The satellite digital imaging system (SDIS) was demonstrated successfully in the search and recovery efforts following hurricanes Katrina and Rita in 2005.

== Advantages/disadvantages ==
Advantages

- Near real-time
- Low cost
- Multi-facet use

Disadvantages

- Unreliable (If high cloud-cover is present satellite acquisition is difficult)
- Slow upload (due to sat. feed)
