= North Dakota Wing Civil Air Patrol =

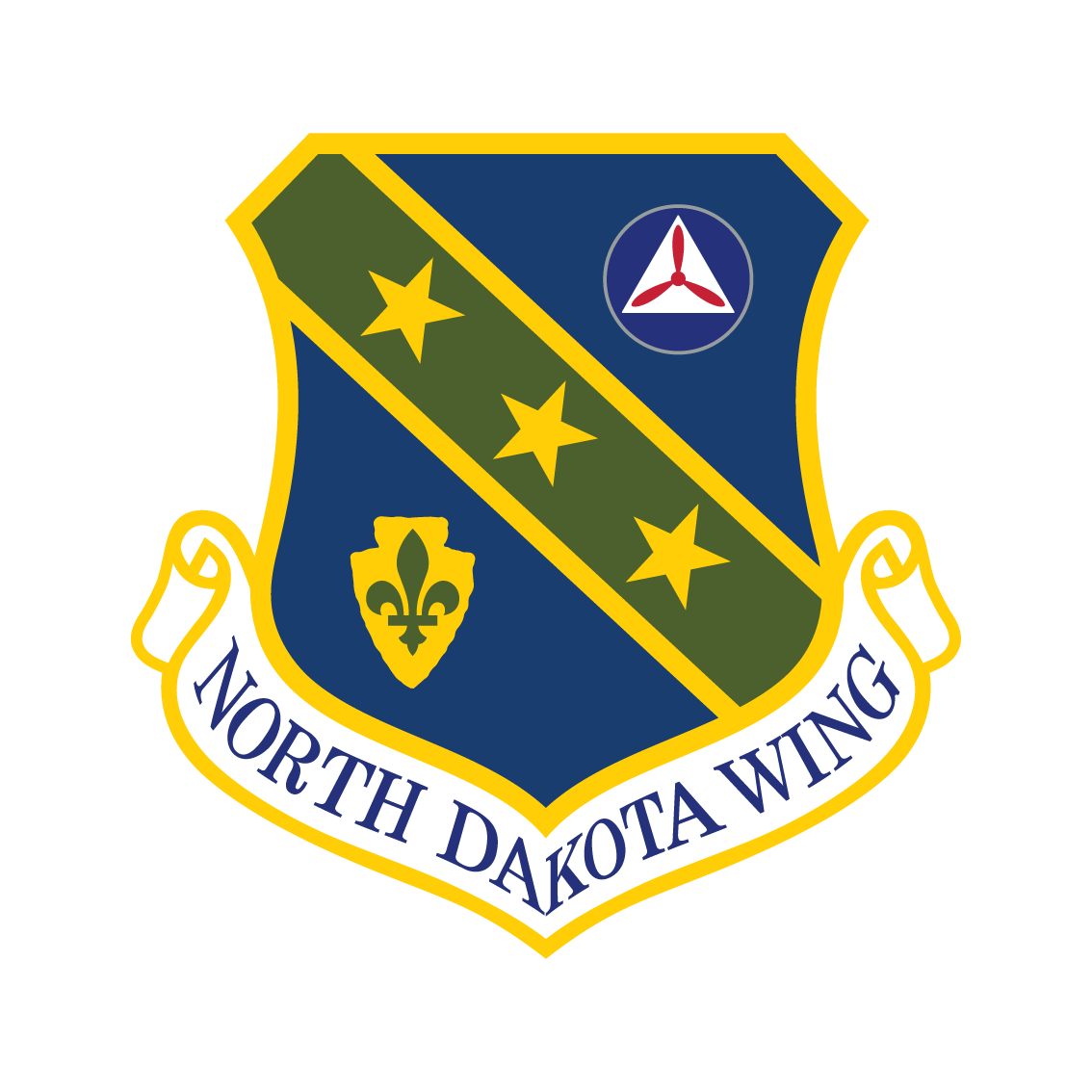
- North Dakota Wing of Civil Air Patrol

Associated branches
- United States Air Force

Command staff
- Commander: Col Roy Barden
- Deputy Commander: Lt Col Ashley Ratliff and Maj Daniel Sauerwein
- Chief of Staff: Maj Jennifer Coburn

Current statistics
- Cadets: 141
- Seniors: 212
- Total Membership: 353
- Awards: 2021 Disaster Relief Mission Award (NCR)
- Website: ndwg.cap.gov
- Statistics as of November 27, 2025

The North Dakota Wing of the Civil Air Patrol (CAP) is the highest echelon of Civil Air Patrol in the state of North Dakota. North Dakota Wing headquarters are located in Bismarck, North Dakota. The North Dakota Wing consists of over 300 cadet and adult members at over 7 locations across the state of North Dakota.

== Mission ==
The North Dakota Wing performs the three primary missions of the Civil Air Patrol: providing emergency services; offering cadet programs for youth; and providing aerospace education for both CAP members and the general public.

=== Emergency services ===
The Civil Air Patrol performs emergency services during emergencies through various missions, including: search and rescue; disaster relief; humanitarian services, and counter-drug operations.

In March 2009, the North Dakota Wing was deployed to respond to flooding along the Red River of the North. Civil Air Patrol ground teams assisted local residents with sandbagging efforts, and erected a dike around a Red Cross building in the path of the flooding. Five aircraft from the North Dakota Wing, along with two aircraft from the South Dakota Wing, made 134 flights to conduct aerial photography missions to survey damage for the state's Emergency Operations Center.

=== Cadet programs ===
The Civil Air Patrol runs a cadet program for the purpose of enhancing the leadership skills of cadets through cultivating an interest in aviation, and also for providing services to the United States Air Force, and the local community.

=== Aerospace education ===
The Civil Air Patrol runs both internal and external aerospace education programs. The internal program provides aerospace education to the CAP membership, both senior and cadet. The external program provides the general public with aerospace education.

== Organization ==
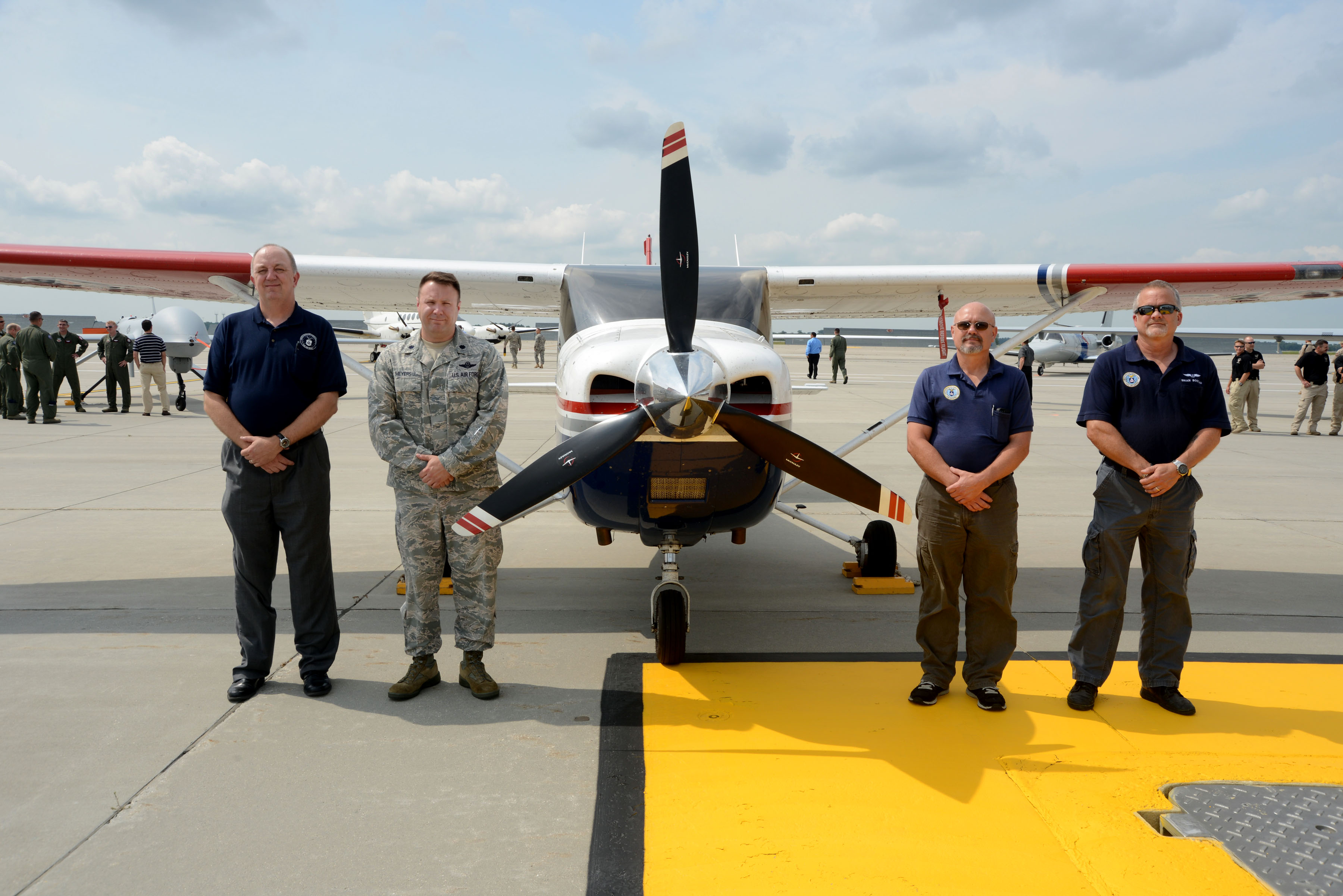
Standing by a CAP Cessna, members from the North Dakota Civil Air Patrol pose for a group photo on the flightline of Grand Forks Air Force Base, N.D.

Squadrons of the North Dakota Wing
Designation	Squadron Name	Location	Notes
NCR-ND-001	North Dakota Wing Headquarters	Bismarck	
NCR-ND-999	North Dakota Legislative Squadron	Bismarck	
NCR-ND-030	Bismarck Composite Squadron	Bismarck	
NCR-ND-031	James Valley Composite Squadron	Jamestown	
NCR-ND-044	Rough Rider Composite Squadron	Dickinson	
NCR-ND-119	119th ANG Cadet Squadron	Fargo	
NCR-ND-046	Red River Senior Squadron	Fargo	
NCR-ND-005	Grand Forks Composite Squadron	Grand Forks	
NCR-ND-021	Magic City Composite Squadron	Minot	
NCR-ND-047	Williston Composite Squadron	Williston	

== Legal protection ==
Employers within the borders of North Dakota may not terminate or demote an employee who is a member of the Civil Air Patrol if that employee takes a leave of absence in order to respond to an emergency mission as a part of the Civil Air Patrol. Nor may an employer discriminate during the hiring process or otherwise deny employment to an individual based on their affiliation with the Civil Air Patrol.

== See also ==
- North Dakota Air National Guard
- State defense force
