= Civil Air Patrol =

Civilian auxiliary of the US Air Force

- Seal of Civil Air Patrol; Logo of Civil Air Patrol
- Founded: 1 December 1941; 84 years ago
- Country: United States
- Branch: United States Air Force
- Type: Civilian auxiliary
- Role: Search and rescue; Disaster relief; Aerospace education; Cadet programs
- Size: 65,000 volunteers; 560 light aircraft; over 1,000 ground vehicles
- Part of: First Air Force; Air Combat Command
- Headquarters: Maxwell Air Force Base; Montgomery, Alabama, U.S.
- Mottos: Semper Vigilans; Always Vigilant
- March: "The C.A.P. Is on the Go"
- Anniversaries: 1 December
- Engagements: Antisubmarine, World War II
- Website: gocivilairpatrol.com

Commanders
- National Commander: Maj Gen Regena M. Aye
- National Deputy Commander: Brig Gen R. Jason Bailey
- National Command Chief: CMSgt Luis E. Negrón

Insignia
- Flag

- Roundel

- Command Emblem

Aircraft flown
- Powered: Cessna 172, Cessna 182, Cessna 206, MT-7-235, de Havilland L-20, GippsAero GA8; Unpowered: LET L-23, Schweizer SGS 2-33, Schweizer SGU 2-22, Schleicher ASK 21

Civil Air Patrol (CAP) is a congressionally chartered, federally supported non-profit corporation that serves as the official civilian auxiliary of the United States Air Force (USAF). CAP is a volunteer organization with an aviation-minded membership that includes members from all backgrounds. The program is established as an organization by Title 10 of the United States Code and its purposes defined by Title 36.

Membership in the organization consists of cadets ranging from 12 to just under 21 years of age, and senior members 18 years of age and up. These two groups each have the opportunity to participate in a wide variety of pursuits; the cadet program contributes to the development of the former group with a structured syllabus and an organization based upon United States Air Force ranks, while the older members serve as instructors, supervisors, and operators. Most members wear uniforms while performing their duties. However, there is a category of Aerospace Education Member available to educators and these AEMs do not wear uniforms or attend meetings, but take advantage of professionally generated textbooks, lesson plans and other CAP-provided resources, in their capacity as educators.

Nationwide, CAP is a major operator of single-engine general aviation aircraft, almost exclusively Cessna's, used in the execution of its various missions, including orientation flights for cadets and the provision of significant emergency services capabilities. Because of these extensive flying opportunities, many CAP members become licensed pilots.

The hierarchical and military auxiliary organization is headed by the National Headquarters (with authority over the national organization) followed by eight regional commands and 52 wings (each of the 50 states plus Washington, D.C., and Puerto Rico). There is also an Overseas Group which reports directly to National Headquarters, that includes various units located at military bases overseas. Each wing supervises the individual groups and squadrons that comprise the basic operational unit of the organization.

== History ==
Civil Air Patrol was conceived in the late 1930s by aviation advocate Gill Robb Wilson, who foresaw general aviation's potential to supplement America's military operations. With the help of New York mayor Fiorello H. LaGuardia, in his capacity as then-Director of the Office of Civilian Defense, CAP was created with Administrative Order 9, signed by LaGuardia on 1 December 1941 and published 8 December 1941. Civil Air Patrol had 90 days to prove itself to Congress. Major General John F. Curry was appointed as the first national commander. Texas oilman David Harold Byrd was a co-founder of CAP.

During World War II, CAP was seen as a way to use America's civilian aviation resources to aid the war effort instead of grounding them. The organization assumed many missions, including anti-submarine patrol and warfare, border patrols, and courier services. CAP's coastal patrol reportedly flew 24 million miles and sighted 173 enemy U-boats, dropping a total of 82 bombs and depth charges during the conflict. Two submarines were reportedly destroyed by CAP aircraft, but later research found there was no basis for this claim. By the end of the war, 68 CAP members had died in the line of duty.

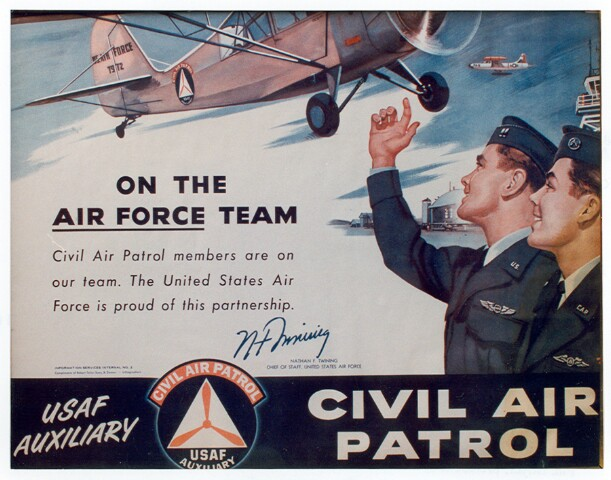
On the Team, Civil Air Patrol poster (1955) featuring an Air Force airman and a CAP cadet, with a CAP L-16 and an Air Force F-94 flying overhead. This poster features the signature of then-Chief of Staff of the United States Air Force, Gen. Nathan F. Twining.

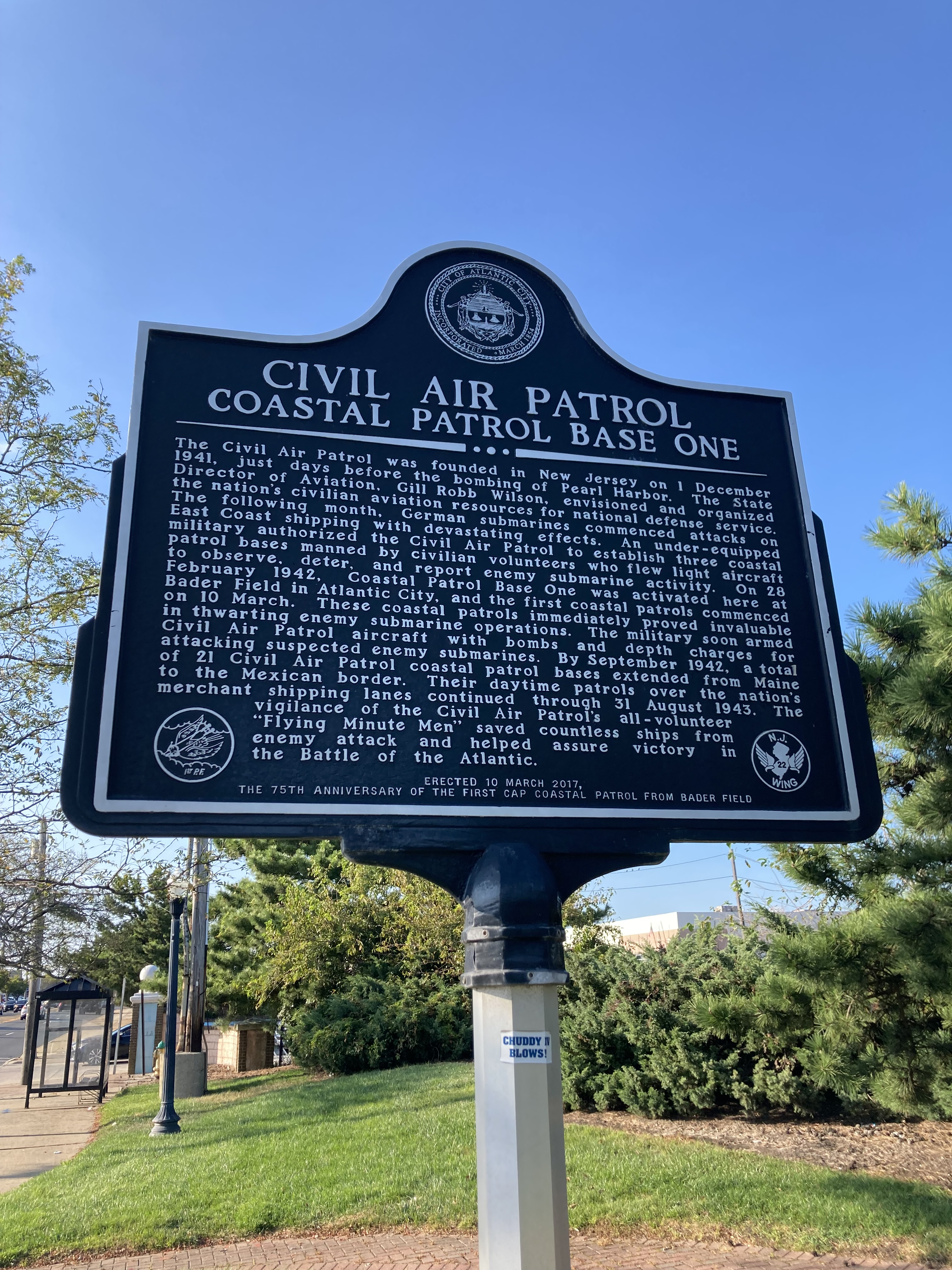
Marker to the Civil Air Patrol, Bader Field, Atlantic City

With the passing of the National Security Act of 1947 and the creation of the United States Air Force, CAP became the auxiliary of the USAF 26 May 1948, and its incorporating charter declared that it would never again be involved in direct combat activities, but would be of a nonviolent nature. The "supervisory" USAF organization overseeing CAP has changed several times. This has included the former Continental Air Command in 1959, the former Headquarters Command, USAF in 1968, to the Air University (AU) in 1976. Following Air University's reassignment as a subordinate command to the Air Education and Training Command (AETC) in 1993, USAF oversight of CAP has flowed from AETC at the 4-star level, to AU at the 3-star level, to AU's Jeanne M. Holm Center for Officer Accessions and Citizen Development at the 1-star level, to a subordinate unit of 1st Air Force at the 3-star level with Civil Air Patrol–U.S. Air Force as a stand-alone unit lead at the Colonel (O-6) level. Since its incorporation charter, CAP has maintained its relationship with the USAF and has continued its three congressionally mandated missions.

On 14 June 2011, Civil Air Patrol was awarded the Roving Ambassador of Peace by the World Peace Prize Awarding Council for its positive impact in American communities, its lifesaving efforts, and for "preserving liberty for all". During the 113th United States Congress, both the United States Senate and the United States House of Representatives voted to pass a bill that would award the Congressional Gold Medal to the World War II members of Civil Air Patrol. The medal would be presented "in recognition of their military service and exemplary record during World War II."

In October 2021, Civil Air Patrol was awarded the Master's Trophy for the North America Region for that year by the Honourable Company of Air Pilots. The award citation noted the auxiliary's service during the COVID-19 pandemic and disaster relief response to Hurricane Ida.

== Organization ==
Although a civilian organization, Civil Air Patrol is organized along military lines, with a streamlined and strictly hierarchical chain of command and a rank system patterned on that of the U.S. Air Force. There are several distinct echelons in its structure: National Headquarters, regions, wings, squadrons and flights. An additional group echelon may be placed between a wing and its squadrons and flights, at the wing commander's discretion.

=== National headquarters ===
The volunteer leaders of the CAP include the National Commander of the Civil Air Patrol and their senior-level staff, comprising a National Deputy Commander, an executive officer, the chief of the CAP Legal Corps, the chief of the CAP Chaplain Service, and the CAP inspector general. The national commander holds the grade of CAP major general, the national deputy commander holds the grade of CAP brigadier general. The rest of the national commander's senior-level staff hold the grade of CAP colonel. This rank is kept permanently following successful service in the role.

CAP is governed by a board of governors, established by federal law in 2001 and consisting of 11 members: four Civil Air Patrol members (currently the national commander, national vice commander, and two members-at-large appointed by the CAP National Executive Committee), four U.S. Air Force representatives appointed by the United States secretary of the Air Force, and three members from the aviation community jointly appointed by the CAP national commander and the Secretary of the Air Force. The board of governors generally meets two or three times annually and primarily provides strategic vision and guidance to the volunteer leadership and to corporate staff.

CAP National Headquarters, located at Maxwell Air Force Base outside Montgomery, Alabama, employs a professional staff of over 100 and is led by the CAP executive director (analogous to a corporate chief operating officer), who reports to the board of governors. The national headquarters staff provides program management for the organization and membership support for the 1,700-plus volunteer field units across the United States.

Headquarters Civil Air Patrol-U.S. Air Force (CAP-USAF) is an active-duty U.S. Air Force unit that operates under the joint jurisdiction of CAP National Headquarters and the U.S. Air Force Air Combat Command, First Air Force. Commanded by an aeronautically rated Air Force colonel, Headquarters CAP-USAF consists of approximately 23 active-duty military and civilian U.S. Air Force personnel; all of the Air Force civil-service personnel at CAP-USAF are also CAP members, staffing CAP-USAF. These members ensure CAP is organized, trained, and equipped to fulfill Air Force-assigned missions; advise, assist, and oversee Civil Air Patrol's operations; and provide liaison between CAP and the U.S. Air Force and other United States government agencies. As of January 2025, the commander of CAP-USAF is Colonel Andrew Stewart and the command chief is CMSGT Shane Williams.

=== Regions and wings ===
Below the national headquarters level are eight geographic regions and a handful of overseas squadrons at various military installations worldwide. Each region, commanded by a CAP colonel, encompasses several statewide organizations referred to as wings. There are 52 CAP wings, one in each of the 50 U.S. states, one (known as the National Capital Wing) in the District of Columbia, and one in the Commonwealth of Puerto Rico. Each wing has a commander who is a CAP colonel and is the sole corporate officer for that state, the District of Columbia, or Puerto Rico. Each wing commander oversees a wing headquarters staff made up of experienced volunteer members.

The regions and their subordinate wings are:

- Northeast Region: Connecticut, Maine, Massachusetts, New Hampshire, New Jersey, New York, Pennsylvania, Rhode Island, and Vermont wings
- Mid Atlantic Region: Delaware, Maryland, National Capital (District of Columbia), North Carolina, South Carolina, Virginia, and West Virginia wings
- Great Lakes Region: Illinois, Indiana, Kentucky, Michigan, Ohio, and Wisconsin wings
- Southeast Region: Alabama, Florida, Georgia, Mississippi, Puerto Rico, and Tennessee wings
- North Central Region: Iowa, Kansas, Minnesota, Missouri, Nebraska, North Dakota and South Dakota wings
- Southwest Region: Arizona, Arkansas, Louisiana, New Mexico, Oklahoma, and Texas wings
- Rocky Mountain Region: Colorado, Idaho, Montana, Utah, and Wyoming wings
- Pacific Region: Alaska, California, Hawaii, Nevada, Oregon, and Washington wings

CAP-USAF assigns active-duty U.S. Air Force personnel to each CAP region and wing to provide liaison for them.

=== Groups ===
The group is an optional level of command in CAP below that of wing. Wing commanders may form groups within their wings when a geographic area or the number of subordinate units becomes too large for effective control by the wing alone. If a CAP group is formed, it must include no fewer than five squadrons.

=== Squadrons ===
Local units are called squadrons. Squadrons are the main functioning bodies and primary operational commands in the CAP. Reporting directly to the wing, or to a group if the wing commander chooses to form one or more groups, squadrons have the responsibility to carry out plans and programs formulated by higher echelons of CAP.

Civil Air Patrol squadrons are designated as either cadet, senior, or composite squadrons. A CAP composite squadron consists of both cadets and senior members, who may be involved in any of the three missions of CAP. Composite squadrons have two deputy commanders to assist the squadron commander: a Deputy Commander for Seniors and a Deputy Commander for Cadets. A senior squadron includes only senior members, who participate in the emergency services or aerospace education missions of CAP. A cadet squadron is largely made up of cadets, with a small number of senior members as necessary for the supervision of cadets and the proper execution of the cadet program. Overseas squadrons operate independently of this structure, reporting directly to the National Headquarters.

=== Flights ===
The lowest level of CAP organization is the flight. Flights are temporary units, usually formed in remote areas with too few CAP personnel to form a squadron, but with a goal of forming a new squadron as quickly as possible by recruiting additional CAP members locally to increase its membership. A flight may consist of no more than 14 CAP members. It may be formed by as few as eight CAP senior members, but if a flight is formed by a mix of senior members and cadets, at least three of the flight's personnel must be senior members. A wing commander may direct a flight to report to a squadron, directly to a group, or directly to the wing itself.

A CAP flight is a semi-independent unit that is used mainly as a stepping-stone for a new unit until they are large enough to be designated a squadron. Due to their transitory nature, there are few flights within CAP structure at any one time. A flight will be assigned to a squadron "parent", and it is the job of the flight and squadron commanders to work together to build the flight into a full and independent squadron. Flights are also used as temporary units within a squadron. These flights are dismissed after the activity or meeting they were created for. A flight within a squadron is assigned a letter, so a flight could be designated "Charlie Flight, Thunderbolt Squadron", for example. In larger squadrons, flights are permanent subunits and cadets are assigned to them.

== Missions ==
Civil Air Patrol has five congressionally mandated missions:

1. To provide an organization to encourage and aid citizens of the United States in contributing their efforts, services, and resources in developing aviation and in maintaining air supremacy; and encourage and develop by example the voluntary contribution of private citizens to the public welfare.
2. To provide aviation education and training, especially to its senior and cadet members.
3. To encourage and foster civil aviation in local communities.
4. To provide an organization of private citizens with adequate facilities to assist in meeting local and national emergencies.
5. To assist the Department of the Air Force in fulfilling its non-combat programs and missions.

The organization condenses these mandates into three core program areas, which are aerospace education, cadet programs, and emergency services.

=== Emergency services ===
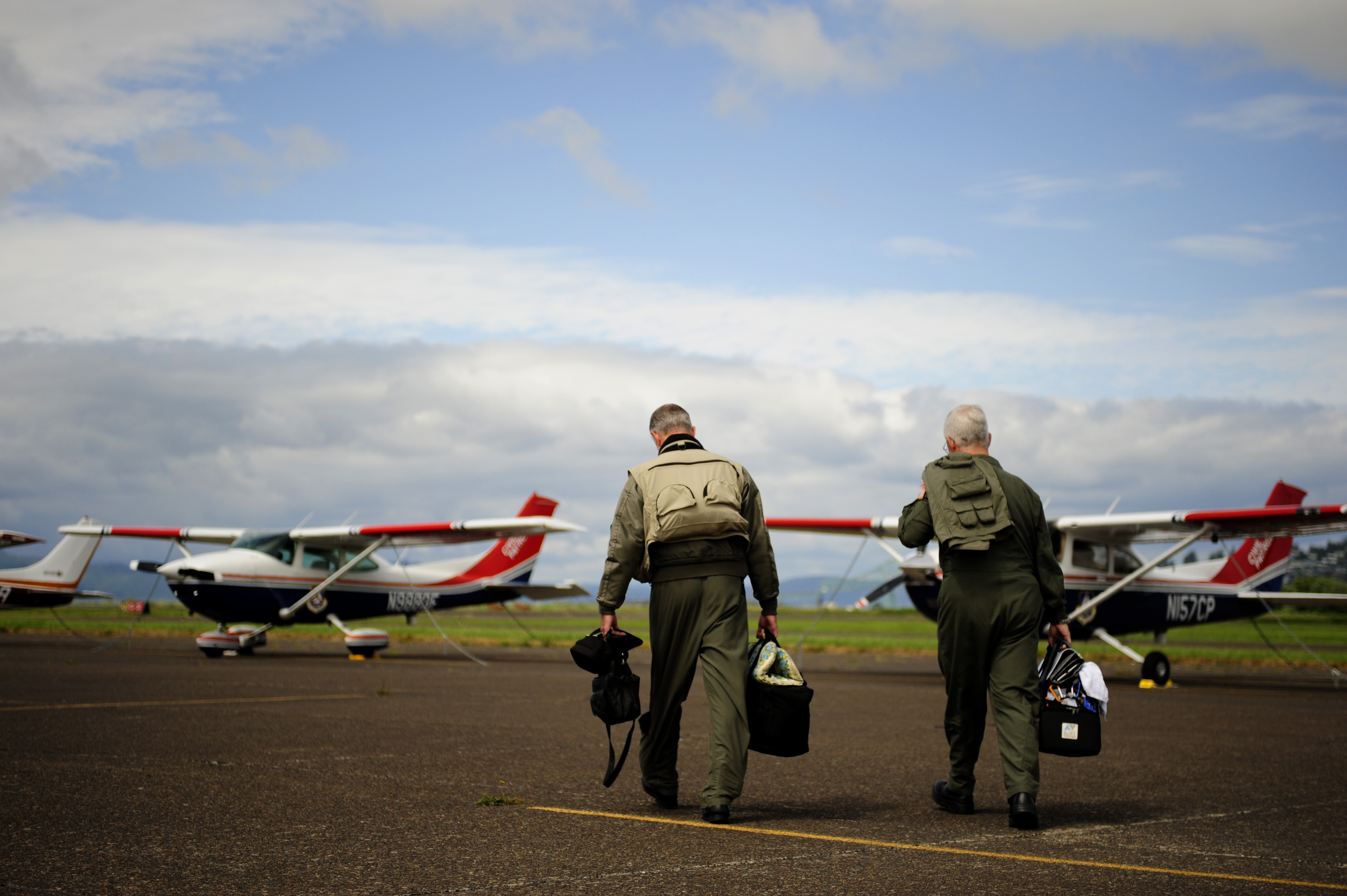
Two Oregon Wing members walk towards their aircraft during a training exercise.

Civil Air Patrol covers several emergency services areas. The principal categories include search and rescue missions, disaster relief, humanitarian services, and United States Air Force support. Other services, such as homeland security and actions against drug-trafficking operations, are becoming increasingly important. CAP missions are assigned on a case-by-case basis by the AFRCC.

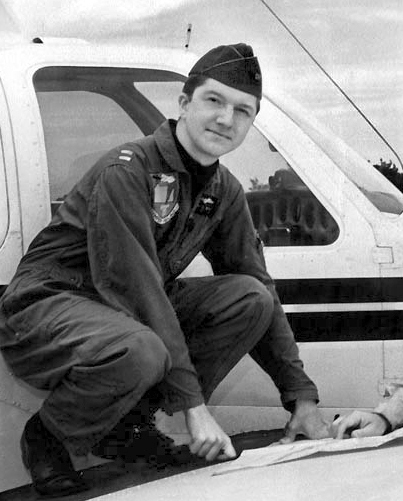
A CAP search and rescue (SAR) pilot

Civil Air Patrol is well known for its search activities in conjunction with search and rescue (SAR) operations. CAP is involved with approximately three quarters of all aerial inland SAR missions directed by the United States Air Force Rescue Coordination Center at Tyndall Air Force Base, Florida. Outside of the contiguous United States, CAP directly supports the Joint Rescue Coordination Centers in Alaska, Hawaii, and Puerto Rico. CAP is credited with saving an average of 100 lives per year.

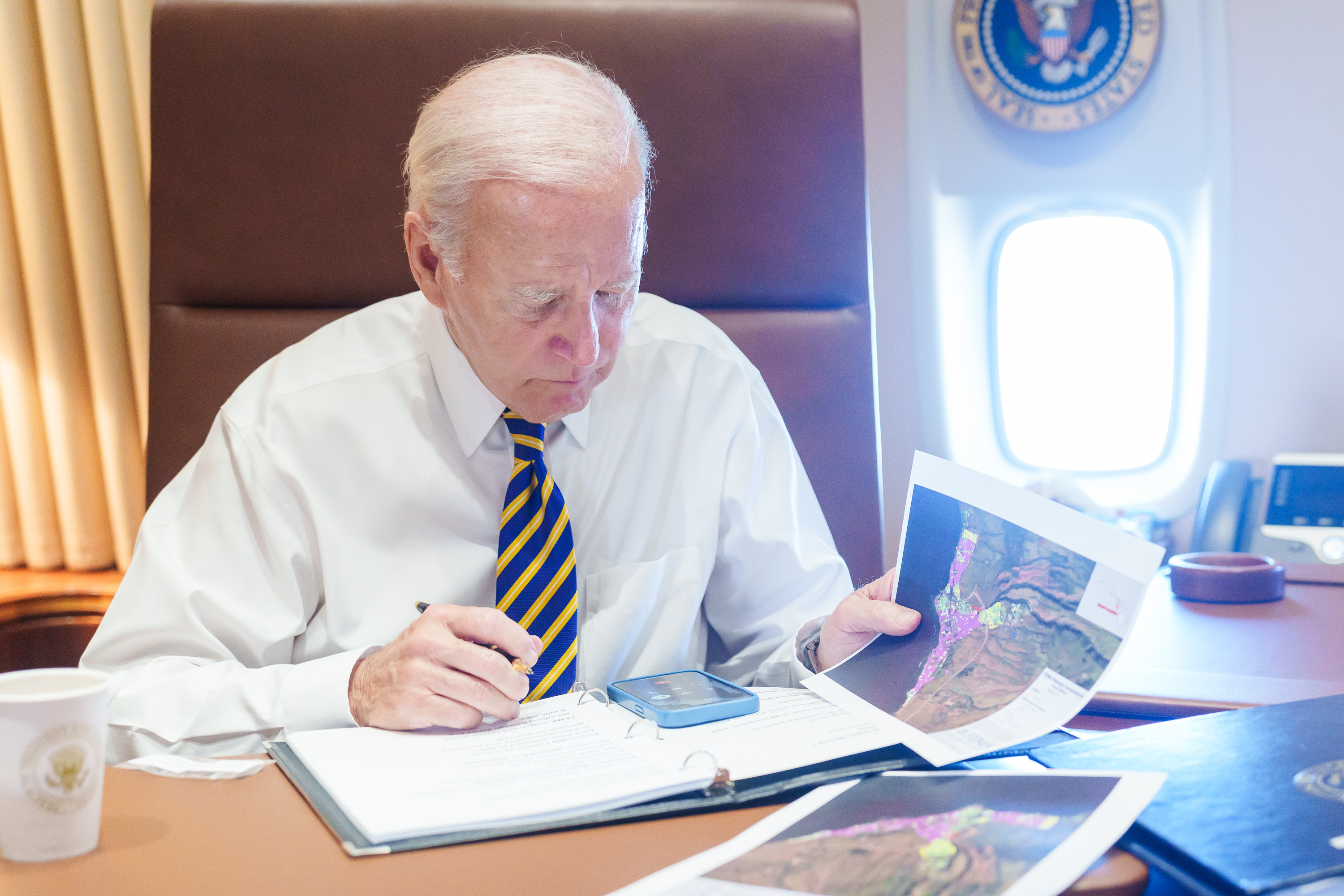
Former President Joe Biden reviews maps of structural damage assessments made by CAP's geospatial team in support of FEMA responding to the 2023 Hawaii wildfires.

CAP is active in disaster relief operations, especially in areas such as Florida, Mississippi and Louisiana that are frequently struck by hurricanes as well as Oklahoma and Texas which are frequented by large, damaging tornadoes. CAP aircrews and ground personnel provide transportation for cargo and officials, aerial imagery and geospatial analysis to aid emergency managers in assessing damage, and donations of personnel and equipment to local, state and federal disaster relief organizations during times of need. In 2004, several hurricanes hit the southeast coast of the United States, with Florida being the worst damaged; CAP was instrumental in providing help to affected areas.

Civil Air Patrol conducts humanitarian service missions, usually in support of the Red Cross. CAP aircrews transport time-sensitive medical materials, including blood and human tissue, when other means of transportation (such as ambulances) are not practical or possible. Following the September 11 attacks on the World Trade Center in New York City when all general aviation was grounded, one of the first planes to fly over the World Trade Center site was a CAP aircraft taking photographs.

CAP performs several missions that are not combat-related in support of the United States Air Force, including damage assessment, transportation of materials, transportation of officials, communications support (as "Highbird" repeaters) and low-altitude route surveys. The CAP fleet is used in training exercises to prepare USAF pilots to intercept enemy aircraft over the Continental United States. Civil Air Patrol aircraft are flown into restricted airspace, where United States Air Force pilots may practice low-speed intercepts.

Civil Air Patrol also provides non-emergency assistance to the U.S. Customs and Border Protection, Drug Enforcement Administration, and United States Forest Service in the war on drugs. In 2005, CAP flew over 12,000 hours in support of this mission and led these agencies to the confiscation of illegal substances valued at over US$400 million. Civil Air Patrol makes extensive use of the Airborne Real-time Cueing Hyperspectral Enhanced Reconnaissance system, mounted on the Gippsland GA8 Airvan. The system is able to evaluate spectral signatures given off by certain objects, allowing the system to identify, for example, a possible marijuana crop.

As a humanitarian service organization, CAP assists federal, state and local agencies in preparing for and responding to homeland security needs. The Red Cross, Salvation Army and other civilian agencies frequently request Civil Air Patrol aircraft to transport vital supplies including medical technicians, medication, and other vital supplies. They often rely on CAP to provide airlift and communications for disaster relief operations. CAP also assists the United States Coast Guard and Coast Guard Auxiliary. The Civil Air Patrol routinely drills for emergencies through Search and Rescue exercises (SAREX). CAP also requires members to renew their qualifications for emergency services usually done during SAREXs.

=== Aerospace education ===
The Aerospace Education Program provides aviation-related education and educational activities for members, including formal, graded courses about all aspects of aviation including flight physics, dynamics, history, and application. Courses covering the space program, and new technologies and advances in aviation and space exploration, are also available. There are several programs for CAP pilots to improve their flying skills and earn Federal Aviation Administration ratings.

The Cadet Program has a mandatory aerospace education program; to progress, a cadet must take several courses and tests relating to aviation. Cadets also have educational opportunities through museum tours, National Cadet Special Activities, military and civilian orientation rides, and guest speakers.

Senior members may study aerospace through the Senior Member Professional Development Program. CAP encourages its senior members to learn about aviation and its history, although this is not mandatory. Those who complete the Aerospace Education Program for Senior Members may earn the Charles E. "Chuck" Yeager Aerospace Education Award.

Through outreach programs, including the External Aerospace Education program, CAP helps school teachers integrate aviation and aerospace into the classroom by providing seminars, and course materials and through sponsorship of the National Congress on Aviation and Space Education. Members also provide their communities with resources for better management of airports and other aviation-related facilities and promote the benefits of such facilities. The organization also works with other groups, such as the Boy Scouts of America, the Girl Scouts of the USA and 4-H to fulfill the education goal set down in the organization's Congressional charter – to "encourage and foster civil aviation in local communities."

== Membership ==
As of 30 September 2023, CAP had 65,531 members – 36,119 senior members and 29,332 cadets – in over 1,600 local units in all fifty states; Washington, D.C.; and Puerto Rico, and at numerous overseas United States Air Force installations. CAP members are civilians and are not paid by the United States government for their service. Rather, members are responsible for paying annual membership fees and must pay for their uniforms and other related expenses.

Senior membership is open to all U.S. citizens, and U.S. legal permanent residents aged 18 and over who can pass an FBI background check. There is no upper age limit, nor membership restrictions for physical disabilities, due to the number of different tasks which members may be called on to perform. Cadet membership is open to those aged between 12 and 18 who maintain satisfactory progress in school, as determined by the cadet's unit commander; upon their 18th birthday, cadets may become senior members or remain in the Cadet Program until they are 21.

The Civil Air Patrol motto, to which all members subscribe, is "Semper Vigilans", Latin for "Always Vigilant". All CAP members are also obligated by their service to the organization to abide by its core values: integrity, volunteer service, excellence, and respect.

=== Senior members ===
Uniformed services pay grade	Special grade	O-10	O-9	O-8	O-7	O-6	O-5	O-4	O-3	O-2	O-1
Civil Air Patrol
Civil Air Patrol				Major general	Brigadier general	Colonel	Lieutenant colonel	Major	Captain	First lieutenant	Second lieutenant	Senior flight officer	Technical flight officer	Flight officer
NATO code	OF-10	OF-9	OF-8	OF-7	OF-6	OF-5	OF-4	OF-3	OF-2	OF-1

Senior members are members who joined CAP for the first time past the age of 18, or who are former cadets who transferred to the senior member program, which must happen by the cadet's 21st birthday. Senior members who have not yet turned 21 years are eligible for flight officer grades, which include flight officer, technical flight officer, and senior flight officer, after completion of Level 2, Part one of Senior Member training. There is no mandatory retirement age for CAP members, and there are no physical requirements for joining. Members may enter retired status after twenty years of service. The only physical requirements senior members must follow are the weight and grooming standards required to wear the United States Air Force-style uniforms. Senior members who do not meet the weight and grooming standards of the United States Air Force may wear alternative uniforms known as CAP Corporate uniforms.

Officer grades up to lieutenant colonel reflect progression in training and organizational seniority, rather than command authority. Because of this, it is not uncommon for senior members commanding groups and squadrons to have members of superior grades serving under them. Current, retired and former members of the United States Armed Forces may be promoted directly to the CAP grade equivalent to their military grade, after completion of Level 2, Part one of Senior Member training, although some choose to follow the same standards as non-prior-service members. Except for a few exceptional cases, senior members are promoted to the grade of CAP colonel only upon appointment as a Region Commander, responsible for overseeing multiple states, or Wing Commander, responsible for the administration of CAP units across an entire state. Only the national deputy commander holds the rank of brigadier general, and only the national commander holds the rank of major general, both of which are temporary ranks that become permanent after successful completion of the role.

Former military enlisted personnel from E-4 (Note: With those at E-4 made CAP staff sergeant) up may choose to retain their grade as senior members in the Civil Air Patrol, with grades E-5 (CAP staff sergeant) through E-9 (CAP chief master sergeant) available, after completion of Level 2, Part one of Senior Member training. Former CAP national commander, Major General Carr, unveiled plans to restructure the CAP NCO program to allow individuals to "enlist" as NCOs and progress through a specific professional development program. According to a U.S. Air Force article on the subject, "The current design of the NCO corps in the CAP only allows former active-duty NCOs to be a part of the corps, with no upgrade training for promotion within the ranks. The newly signed corps structure will mirror the Air Force NCO force structure with an established process to promote and develop NCOs." By 2018 a professional development and promotion pathway was in place for former military enlisted personnel who joined CAP at their previous rank.

Senior members are provided with an optional Senior Member Professional Development program and are encouraged to progress within it. The professional development program consists of five levels, corresponding with grades from second lieutenant to lieutenant colonel. Each level of development has components of leadership training, corporate familiarization and aerospace education, and also professional development within chosen "Specialty Tracks". There are many Specialty Tracks and they are designed both to support the organization and to provide opportunities for senior members to take advantage of skills they have from their private lives.

Available Specialty Tracks include Logistics, Communications, Cadet Programs, Public Affairs, Legal, Administration, Emergency Services, Finance, and many more. Additionally, senior members with specific civilian professional qualifications may be awarded grades based on their professional qualifications. Examples include FAA Certified Flight Instructors, Certified Ground Instructors, attorneys, medical professionals, Certified Public Accountants, clergy, and licensed educators or administrators who are often promoted directly to second lieutenant, first lieutenant or captain, after completion of Level 2, Part one of Senior Member training. Additional promotion may be available after one year time in grade.

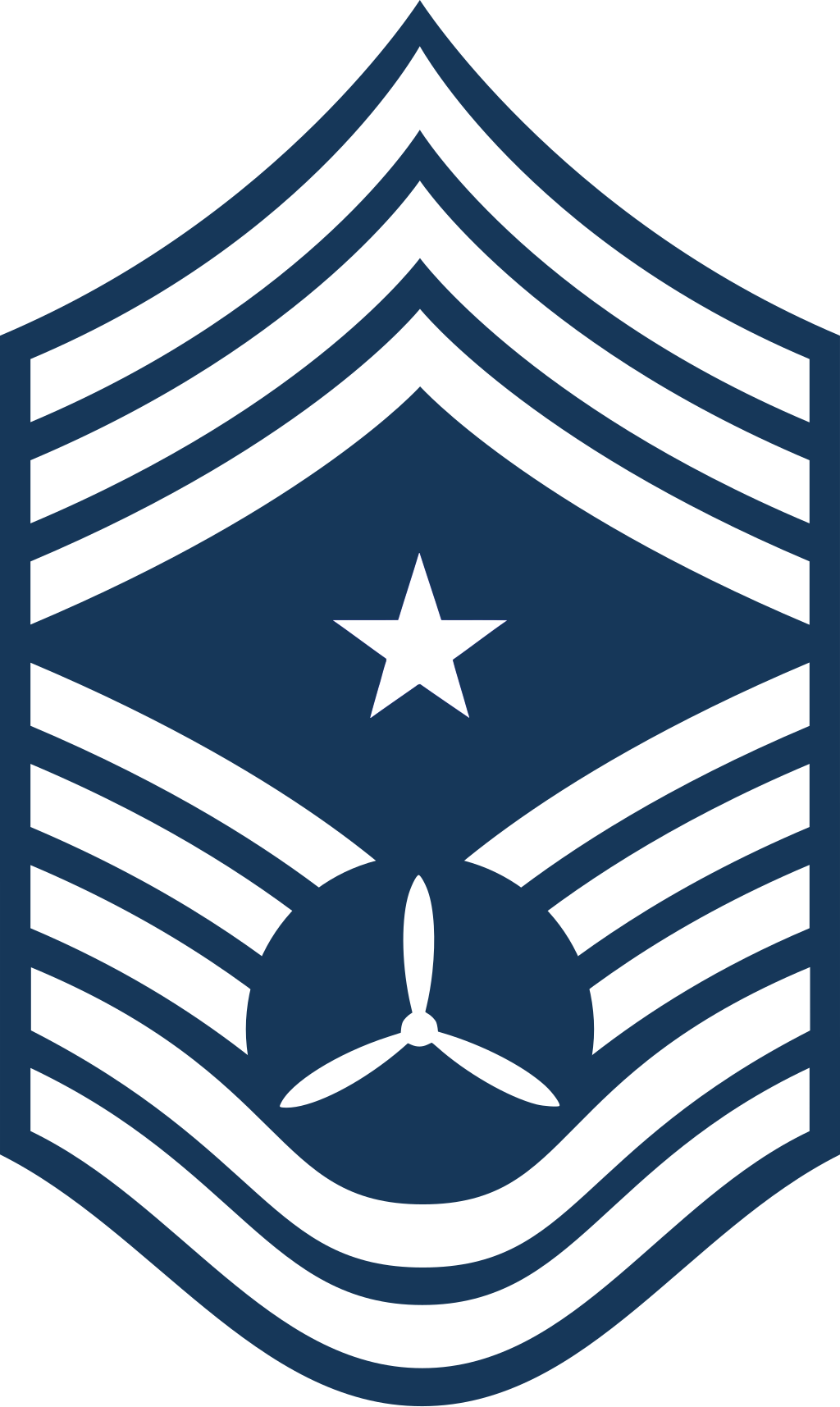
Uniformed services pay grade	Special	E-9	E-8	E-7	E-6	E-5	E-4	E-3	E-2	E-1
Civil Air Patrol
Civil Air Patrol	National Command Chief of the Civil Air Patrol	Chief master sergeant	Senior master sergeant	Master sergeant	Technical sergeant	Staff sergeant
NATO code	OR-9		OR-8	OR-7	OR-6	OR-5	OR-4	OR-3	OR-2	OR-1

In 2020, Civil Air Patrol introduced a new senior professional development program called Volunteer University. Volunteer University provides education and training to CAP senior members through modules and instruction, replacing the previous system including the: Officer Basic Course, Squadron Leadership School, Region Staff College, and National Staff College.

During the tenure of CAP Chief Master Sgt. Todd H. Parsons, the Civil Air Patrol added a new insignia for the position of National Command Chief of the Civil Air Patrol. It is similar to the US Air Force Command Master Chief stripes, but with the USAF star replaced with the CAP Propeller. Unlike all the other senior CAP enlisted rank insignia, it does not contain the letters CAP in between the upper and lower chevrons, but has a single white star.

The Civil Air Patrol University senior member professional development awards recognize those members who have dedicated themselves to leadership and personal development in CAP. These awards include:

- Membership Ribbon
- Leadership Award
- Benjamin O. Davis Jr. Award. There is no ribbon for this award.
- Grover Loening Award
- Paul E. Garber Award
- Gill Robb Wilson Award
Membership Ribbon

Leadership Ribbon

Loening Ribbon

Garber Ribbon

Wilson Ribbon

=== Cadet members ===
Cadets listen to instructions during a field exercise.

Civil Air Patrol's cadet program is a traditional military-style cadet program with over 28,000 cadets nationwide and is one of the three main missions of the Civil Air Patrol. CAP cadets wear modified versions of United States Air Force uniforms, hold rank and grade, and practice military customs and courtesies. They are required to maintain physical fitness standards and are tested on their knowledge of leadership and aerospace subjects at each promotion opportunity.

==== Concept ====
The current CAP Cadet Program was designed by John V. "Jack" Sorenson who held the position of Civil Air Patrol's Director of Aerospace Education in the 1960s. This program has four phases (Learning, Leadership, Command, and Executive) each of which is divided into several achievements. Achievements generally correspond to grade promotions, while phases are tied to levels of responsibility. The Cadet Program operates at a local unit (squadron) level with weekly meetings and weekend activities but also has national and wing-sponsored events, including week-long and multi-week summer activities and camps.

As cadets progress through the program, they are given additional responsibility for scheduling, teaching, guiding and commanding the other cadets in their units. They also assist their senior staff in executing the Cadet Program. It is not unusual for a cadet officer to command an encampment of hundreds of junior Cadets. Cadets are given many opportunities to lead and to follow; they may hold leadership positions at squadron and wing activities and are often involved in planning these activities. Cadets may complete paperwork, command other cadets, and teach at weekly meetings and at weekend and summer events. The U.S. Congress stated in the Recruiting, Retention, and Reservist Promotion Act of 2000 that CAP and similar programs "provide significant benefits for the Armed Forces, including significant public relations benefits".

==== Cadet program awards and grade structure ====
Cadets have a rank structure similar to the United States Air Force enlisted and officer grades, excluding those of general officers. A cadet starts as a cadet airman basic and is promoted as he or she completes each achievement. Unlike the armed forces, where it is possible to enter either directly as a commissioned following completion of some form of officer training (service academy, college ROTC, or OCS/OTS, etc.), or enlist and eventually advance to non-commissioned officer or petty officer status, a CAP cadet must be promoted through every CAP cadet enlisted grade to achieve the rank of CAP cadet second lieutenant.

To complete an achievement, a cadet must pass a physical fitness test and two written tests, one for leadership and one for aerospace education. The only exceptions to this rule are the promotions to cadet airman and cadet staff sergeant, which have no aerospace test. For some achievements, an additional test of drill proficiency is required. Achievements excluding milestone awards do not require tests, simply interactive modules in the learning management system, Absorb. In the new promotion system, effective as of 2010, there is a drill test for all CAP cadet enlisted grades.

Cadet Officer Ranks

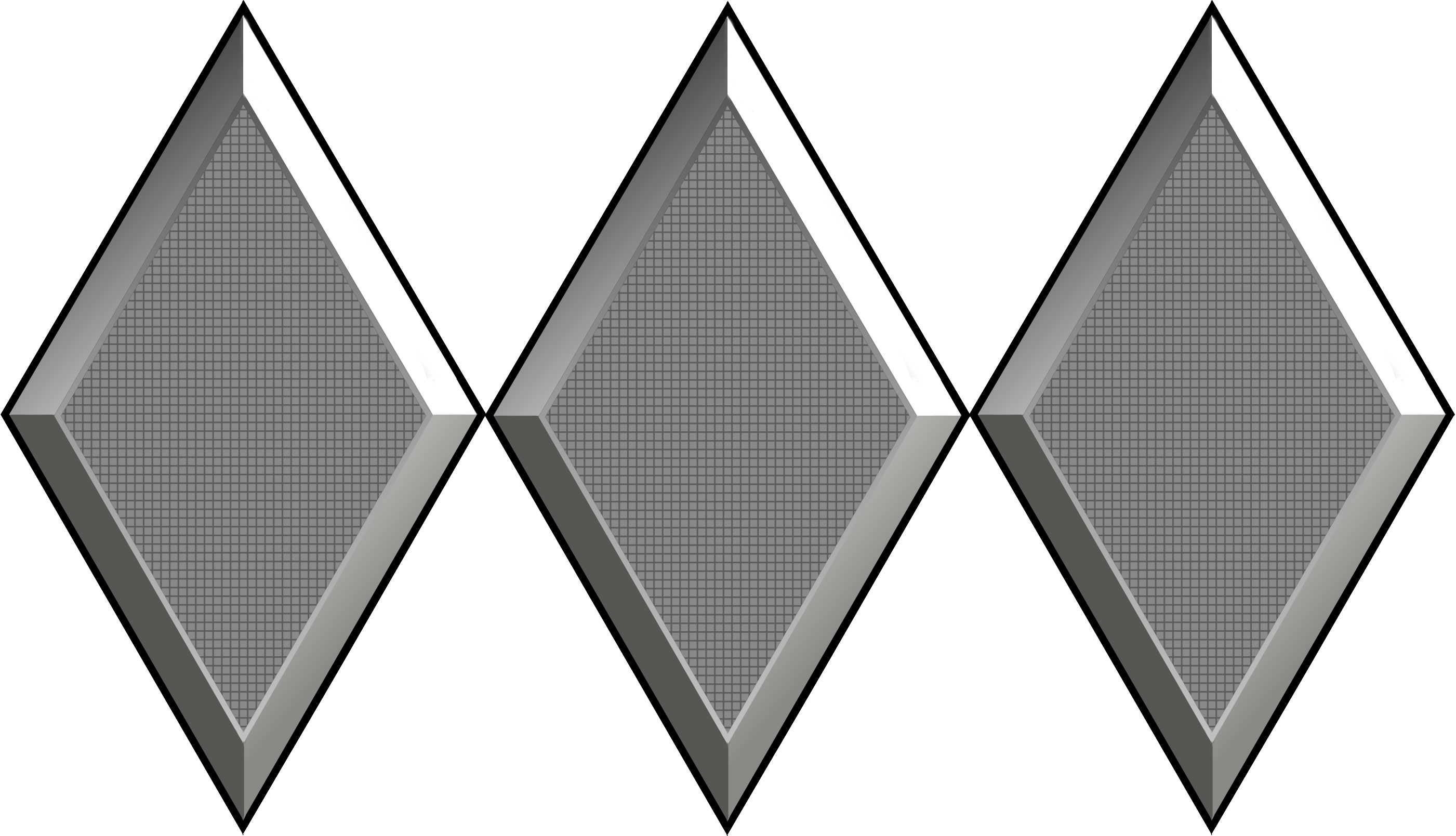
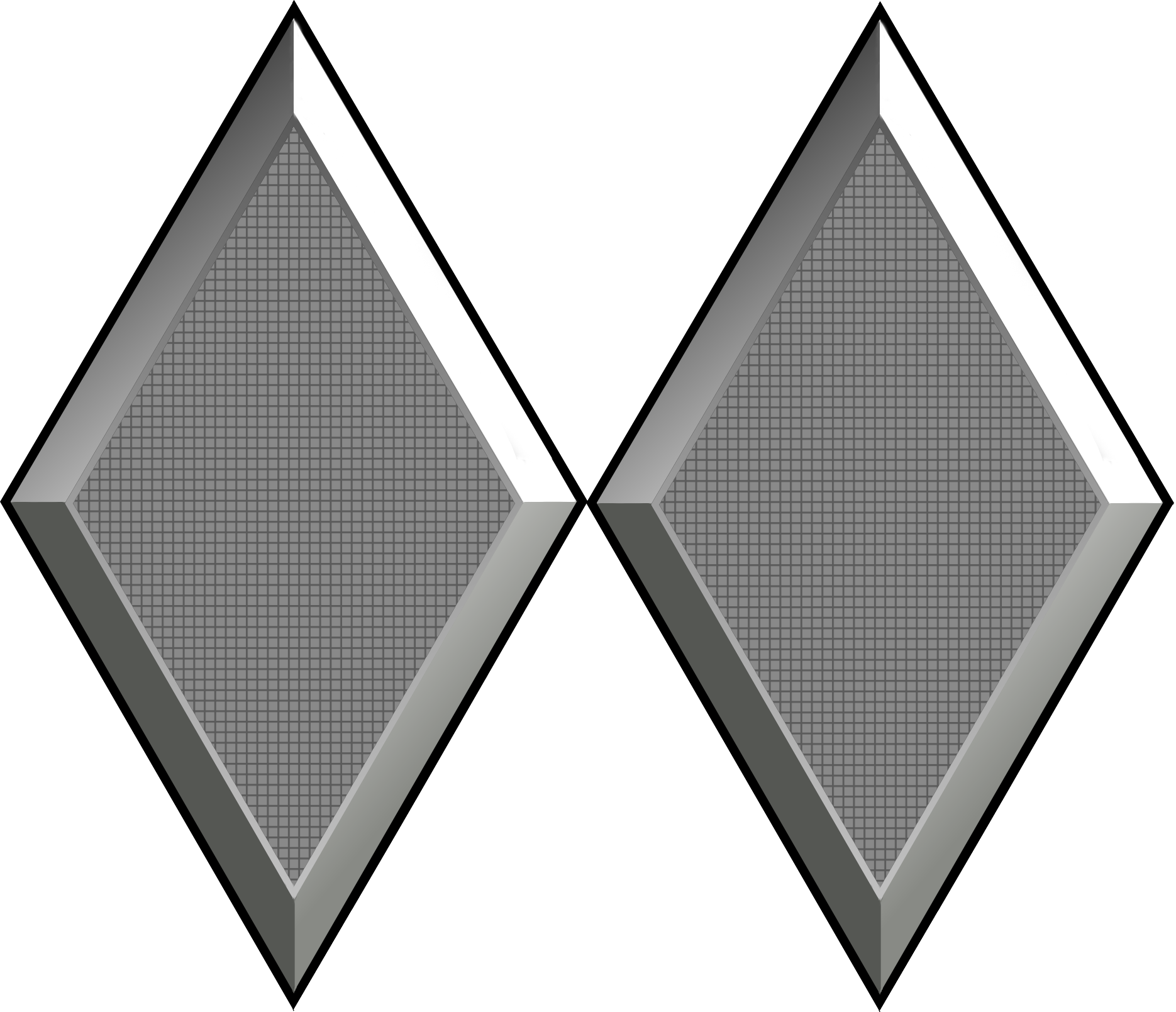
Uniformed services pay grade	Special grade	O-10	O-9	O-8	O-7	O-6	O-5	O-4	O-3	O-2	O-1
Civil Air Patrol	No equivalent							Cadet Major insignia			Cadet Second lieutenant insignia
Civil Air Patrol	No equivalent					Cadet colonel C/Col	Cadet lieutenant colonel C/Lt Col	Cadet major C/Maj	Cadet captain C/Capt	Cadet first lieutenant C/1st Lt	Cadet second lieutenant C/2d Lt

Cadet Enlisted Ranks

Uniformed services pay grade	Special	E-9	E-8	E-7	E-6	E-5	E-4	E-3	E-2	E-1
Civil Air Patrol										No insignia
Civil Air Patrol	Cadet chief master sergeant C/CMSgt		Cadet senior master sergeant C/SMSgt	Cadet master sergeant C/MSgt	Cadet technical sergeant C/TSgt	Cadet staff sergeant C/SSgt	Cadet senior airman C/SrA	Cadet airman first class C/A1C	Cadet airman C/Amn	Cadet airman basic C/AB

The milestones in the Civil Air Patrol Cadet Program are the Wright brothers Award, the General Billy Mitchell Award, the Amelia Earhart Award, the General Ira C. Eaker Award and the General Carl A. Spaatz Award. As of January 2025, 2,565 Spaatz Awards had been earned since the first was awarded to Cadet Douglas Roach in 1964. Cadet Roach went on to a United States Air Force career and later became a pilot in the Air Force Thunderbirds aerial demonstration team.

Wright Brothers Ribbon

Mitchell Ribbon

Earhart Ribbon

Eaker Ribbon

Spaatz Ribbon

Each milestone award in Civil Air Patrol confers upon a cadet various benefits. Upon earning the Mitchell Award and the grade of cadet second lieutenant, a cadet is eligible for promotion the rank of airman first class (E-3) upon enlistment in the United States Air Force. A cadet earning the Earhart Award and being promoted to C/Capt and, if age 17 or older, is eligible to be selected to attend the International Air Cadet Exchange.

According to the CAP Knowledgebase website, the percentages for cadets receiving the milestone awards are estimated to be as follows:

- Mitchell: 15%
- Earhart: 5%
- Eaker: 2%
- Spaatz: ≈0.5%

Accelerated promotions are available for CAP cadets who are also enrolled in Junior Reserve Officer Training Corps units.

Cadets that transition to senior member status between the ages of 18 and 20 receive the grade of flight officer (if the highest cadet award earned was the Mitchell), technical flight officer (if the highest cadet award earned was the Earhart) or senior flight officer (if the highest cadet award earned was the Spaatz) after completion of Level 2, Part one of senior member training. If the cadet waits until their 21st birthday, at which point they are required to transfer to the senior member program, they are eligible for the grade of second lieutenant (if the highest cadet award was the Mitchell), first lieutenant (if the highest cadet award was the Earhart), or captain (if the highest cadet award was the Spaatz). After completion of Level 2, part one of senior member training.

CAP also has advancements that do not earn a new rank. This can be seen at achievement 7, where a cadet will receive the rank of Cadet Chief Master Sergeant, though after completion of achievement 8, the cadet will not advance in grade until the next milestone. This can also be seen in most cadet officer ranks excluding C/Lt. Col. and C/Col.

==== Activities ====
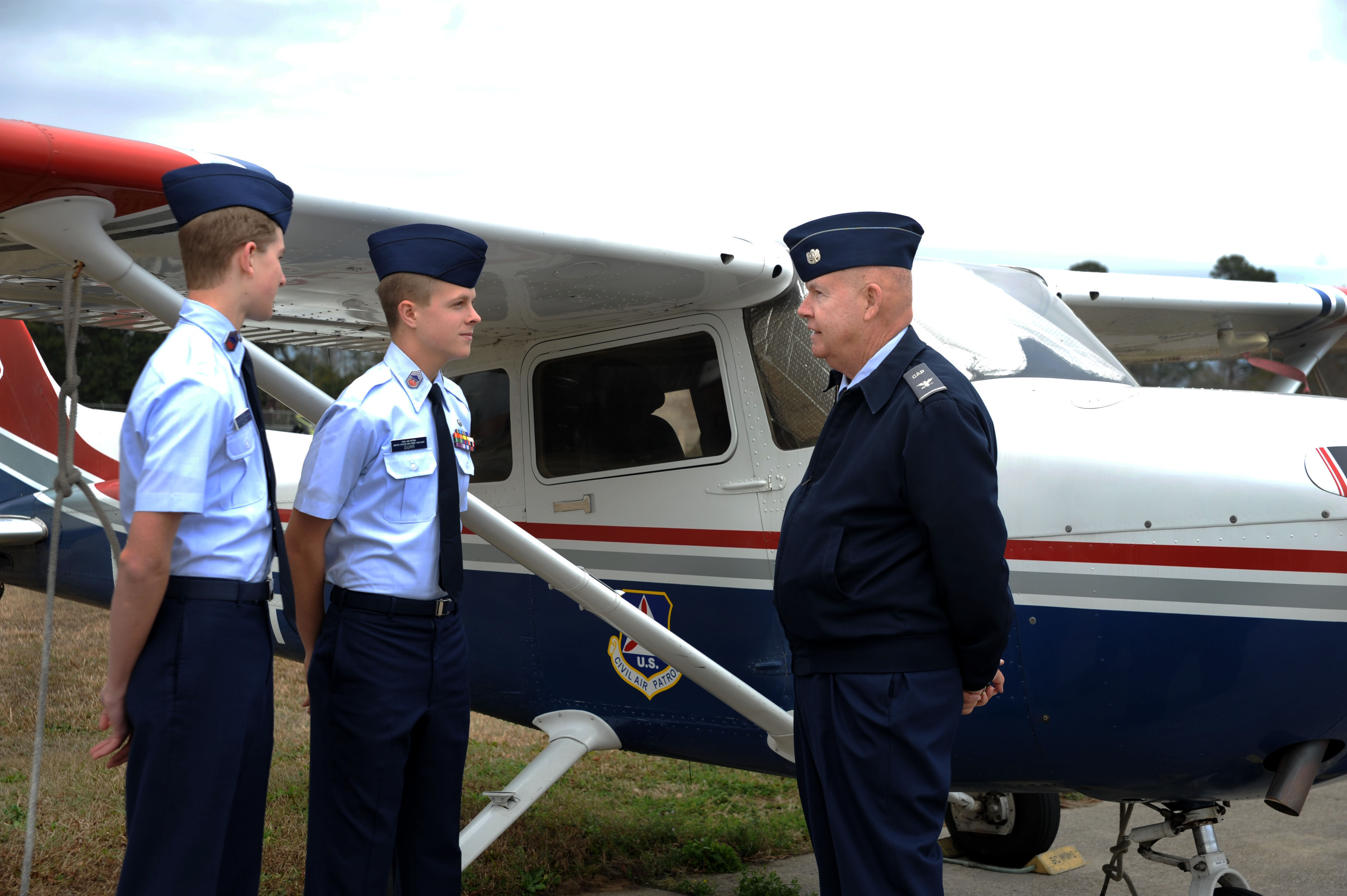
Two cadets speak to a senior member in front of a Cessna 172.

Cadets under the age of 18 are eligible for ten orientation flights in Civil Air Patrol aircraft, including five glider and five airplane flights. Glider flights can be replaced by "powered" flights at the discretion of the Wing Commander, depending on the availability of the aircraft. Cadets are also eligible for an unlimited number of back-seat airplane flights if conditions allow. Cadets over 18 years of age can still participate in military orientation flights, and some CAP wings have flight academies where cadets can learn to fly. The United States Air Force and United States Army also frequently schedule orientation flights for CAP cadets in transport aircraft such as the KC-135 Stratotanker, KC-10 Extender, C-130 Hercules and the C-17 Globemaster III or, in the case of the Army, UH-60 Black Hawk and CH-47 Chinook helicopters.

Civil Air Patrol's core cadet activity is the summer encampment. Typically a seven to ten-day event, cadets are put into an intense, military-structured environment with emphasis on physically and mentally demanding tasks, in addition to required classes and activities. These classes include aerospace education, United States Air Force organization, cadet programs, and drug demand reduction. Activities include classroom courses, physical training, leadership development, and drill & ceremonies. Encampments are usually held at the wing (state) level and, when available are usually at military installations, preferably active United States Air Force, Air Force Reserve Command or Air National Guard installations, with military support.

The Region Cadet Leadership Schools (RCLS) provide training to increase knowledge, skills, and attitudes regarding leadership and management. Cadets who attend RCLS are often serving in, or preparing to enter, cadet leadership positions within their squadron. RCLSs are conducted at region level, or at wing level with region approval. The RCLS programs are more or less modeled on USAFA upperclassmen programs, the college Air Force ROTC Professional Officer Course (POC) and the latter stages of OTS. One variation on this theme are CAP Cadet Non-Commissioned Officer Schools and Academies, which are cadet NCO schools designed to teach basic leadership and principles to cadet leaders during their earlier duty positions in the cadet program.

At the national level, cadets are allowed to participate in the National Blue Beret program, where they help support operations during the EAA AirVenture Oshkosh event.

==== Cadet Oath ====
Cadets ascribe to the following oath during their membership, and must recite it from memory before gaining their C/Amn promotion:

I pledge that I will serve faithfully in the Civil Air Patrol Cadet Program, and that I will attend meetings regularly, participate actively in unit activities, obey my officers, wear my uniform properly, and advance my education and training rapidly to prepare myself to be of service to my community, state, and nation.

One requirement for promotion in the Cadet Program is the ability to recite this oath, verbatim, from memory.

=== Aerospace education member ===
Aerospace education members (AEM) are formal or informal educators at the kindergarten to grade 12 level (K-12) at schools, youth organizations, and libraries. The AEM does not belong to, or attend meetings of, a local squadron, nor wear a uniform. These members are eligible to receive K-12 books, STEM kits, and student materials. They are also eligible to participate in free Teacher Orientation Program flights.

== Relationship to the military ==
While CAP is chartered by Congress and is the auxiliary of the Air Force, it is not an operating reserve component under the United States Air Force or the federal government. The Secretary of the Air Force may use the services of Civil Air Patrol to fulfill the non-combat programs and missions of the Department of the Air Force.

Civil Air Patrol members are not subject to the Uniform Code of Military Justice and do not have command or authority over any members of the United States military. Similarly, military officers have no command authority over CAP members. As part of recognition of CAP's service to the USAF, however, senior members in the grade of second lieutenant and above are allowed to wear the "U.S." collar insignia as an official part of their dress blue uniform. All CAP members are required to render military courtesies to all members of the US military and those of friendly foreign nations; however, as CAP officers are not commissioned by the President of the United States, military personnel are not required to render military courtesies to CAP personnel, though this can be done as a courtesy. CAP members, however, are expected to render military courtesies to one another.

Although CAP retains the title "United States Air Force Auxiliary" this auxiliary status only applies when CAP members and resources are on a United States Air Force-assigned mission with an Air Force-assigned mission number. When CAP resources are engaged in a USAF mission they are reimbursed by the Air Force for communications expenses, fuel and oil, and a share of aircraft maintenance expenses. In addition, CAP members are covered by the Federal Employees Compensation Act (FECA) in the event of injury while participating in the mission. At all other times, such as when aiding civilian authorities, CAP remains and acts as a private, non-profit corporation.

The USAF's Air Combat Command (ACC), through 1st Air Force, is the parent command of CAP. In October 2002, the USAF announced plans to move CAP "operational" mission activities from the Air Force's operations directorate (HAF/A3) to the Air Force's newly created homeland security directorate.

In an announcement on 28 August 2015 by Gen. Mark Welsh, Air Force Chief of Staff, Civil Air Patrol is included in the U.S. Air Force's definition of the "total force". To accomplish this, the USAF updated Doctrine Volume 2, Leadership, to expand the descriptions of total force and "Airmen" to consist of active duty Air Force, Air National Guard, Air Force Reserve, Air Force Auxiliary, and Air Force Civilian Service members. Part of that Total Force inclusion was a realignment in the responsible command which moved Civil Air Patrol-U.S. Air Force (CAP-USAF) from Air Education and Training Command through the Jeanne M. Holm Center for Officer Accession and Citizen Development at Maxwell AFB, Alabama, to Air Combat Command through 1st Air Force. This change took place on 24 June 2016.

== Uniforms ==
Civil Air Patrol's uniforms provide a distinctive and standard set of uniform items intended to provide a positive public image, build morale, and enhance the professionalism of the organization's membership.

CAP members wear the same uniforms as active duty, guard, and reserve members, but worn with distinctive emblems, insignia, and badges to identify them as CAP members; these are categorized as "USAF-style uniforms". USAF-style uniforms may be worn by all cadets under age 18, and by cadets over age 18 and senior members who meet height and weight standards set by CAP's uniform manual. In addition, CAP has a series of what are categorized as "Corporate-style uniforms" which may be worn by all senior members, and also by those cadets over age 18 who do not meet height and weight standards set for the USAF-style uniform.

Uniforms are categorized in CAP's uniform manual by the environment in which the uniform is to be worn or the work to be accomplished.

Type	Purpose	USAF-style uniforms	Corporate-style uniforms
Dress uniforms	These uniforms are worn for social functions of a formal and/or official nature (e.g., black tie affairs). The tuxedo is the civilian equivalent.	Mess Dress; AF Semi-Formal Uniform (authorized for cadets only)	Corporate Semi-Formal Uniform; Appropriate Civilian Attire
Service uniforms	Service uniforms are the everyday uniform for CAP business. The appropriate combination depends on the commander's direction and the type of event, but these uniforms are usually worn for unit meetings, professional development events, conferences, etc.	Service Dress Uniform (Class A); Blue Service Uniform (Class B)	Corporate Service Dress Uniform; Aviator Shirt Uniform; Corporate Working Uniform
Working uniforms	These working uniforms are the appropriate uniform in a flying, field, or mission environment. The choice of which combination is appropriate depends on the commander's direction and the type of event. The Corporate Working Uniform may be worn in a flying, field or mission setting when the USAF-style Class B or Aviator Shirt Uniform would be worn.	Operational Camouflage Pattern Uniform (OCP); Airman Battle Uniform (ABU); Flight Duty Uniform (FDU)	CAP Field Uniform; Corporate Flight Duty Uniform; Corporate Working Uniform

These uniform types are composed of:

- United States Air Force-style uniforms:
  - Service Dress Uniform (Class A) – the United States Air Force's service dress uniform, consisting of dark blue trousers, light blue shirt with tie, dark blue jacket, and a flight or service cap. Rank is indicated on CAP-distinctive gray epaulets (for senior member officers) or sleeve stripes (for senior member non-commissioned officers). Cadet ranks are shown by epaulets, metal grade insignia.
  - Blue Service Uniform (Class B) – identical to the service dress uniform, except without the dark blue jacket. The tie is optional when in short sleeves. Cadet enlisted and NCOs wear metal grade insignia on the collar.
  - Operational Camouflage Pattern Uniform (OCP) – the current utility uniform of the USAF, authorized for wear by CAP members on November 4th, 2025, mandatory for wear on October 31st, 2028. Configuration is similar to the USAF's manner of wear, with CAP-distinctive name and branch tapes and full color unit, higher headquarters, and reversed U.S. Flag patches. An "AUX" duty identifier patch, similar to those previously authorized by the USAF and broadly identical in function to "SDF" patches worn by state guards, is worn on the left sleeve.
  - Airman Battle Uniform (ABU) – the digital tiger stripe style United States Air Force field uniform, which was phased out by the USAF in 2021. Accoutrements include dark blue name tapes, silver text, metal insignia on the collar for enlisted grade cadets, cloth insignia for cadet officers and senior members, and black boots. This uniform will be phased out on October 31, 2028.
  - Flight Duty Uniform (FDU) – green Nomex one-piece CWU 27/P flight suit worn by United States Air Force flight crews, styled similar to Air Mobility Command flight crews, but with CAP insignia. This is worn by CAP flight personnel only.
  - Mess Dress Uniform – the dark blue United States Air Force mess dress uniform with CAP-distinctive insignia and sleeve braid. This is worn by senior members only.
- Corporate-style ("CAP distinctive") uniforms:
  - Corporate Field Uniform – a dark blue version of the battle dress uniform.
  - Aviator Shirt Uniform – an aviator white shirt with gray epaulets, and gray trousers.
  - Corporate Flight Duty Uniform – a dark blue version of the one-piece flight suit made of Nomex or cotton material.
  - Corporate Service Dress Uniform – a dark blue blazer jacket worn with a white shirt, gray trousers, and a CAP or United States Air Force tie.
  - Corporate Working Uniform – a dark blue short-sleeve polo shirt with the CAP seal screened or embroidered on the chest, and gray trousers. This is only worn by senior members.

== Equipment ==
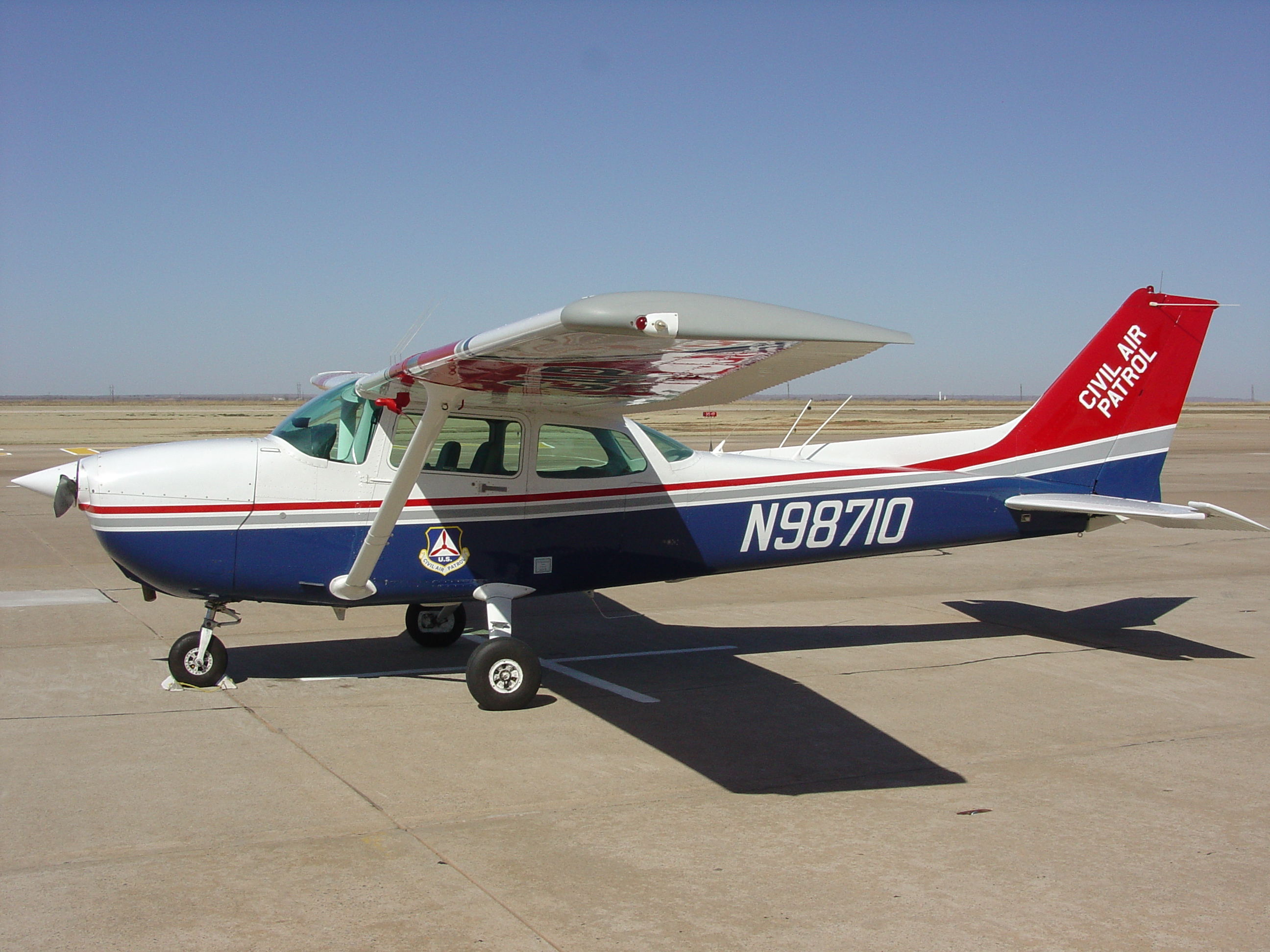
Civil Air Patrol Cessna 172

Civil Air Patrol operates and maintains fixed-wing aircraft, training gliders, ground vehicles, and a national radio communications network.

Civil Air Patrol owns and operates a fleet of predominantly Cessna 172 Skyhawk and Cessna 182 Skylane aircraft. The aircraft are in a phased refurbishment program that began in 2008, replacing engines, interior, avionics, and paint at a lower cost than new purchases.

In 2003, the Australian designed and built eight-seat GippsAero GA8 Airvan was added to the fleet. Sixteen of Civil Air Patrol's fleet of 18 Airvans carry the Airborne Real-time Cueing Hyperspectral Enhanced Reconnaissance (ARCHER) system, which can be used to search for aircraft wreckage based on its spectral signature. Other aircraft types include the Cessna 206 and the Maule MT-235. CAP also has a number of gliders, such as the LET L-23 Super Blaník, the Schleicher ASK 21 and the Schweizer SGS 2-33, used mainly for cadet orientation flights.

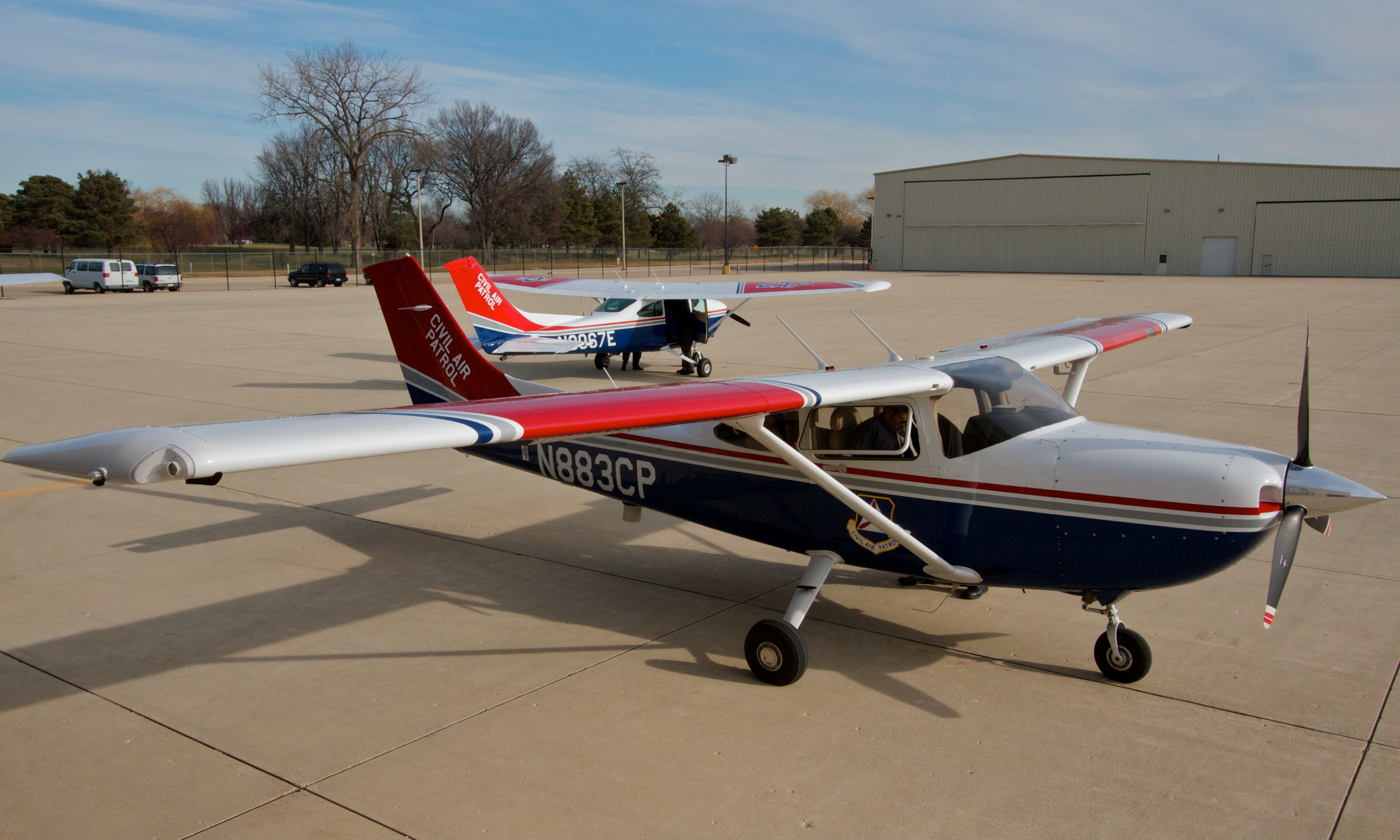
Two Civil Air Patrol Cessna 182s

In addition to CAP's own corporate fleet, many member-owned aircraft are made available for official tasking by CAP's volunteers should the need arise. Aircraft on search missions are generally crewed by at least three qualified aircrew members: a mission pilot, responsible for the safe flying of the aircraft; a mission observer, responsible for navigation, communications and coordination of the mission as well as ground observation; and a mission scanner who is responsible for looking for crash sites and damage clues. Additionally, the mission scanner may double as a satellite digital imaging system (SDIS) operator. Larger aircraft may have additional scanners aboard, providing greater visual coverage. Because of the additional ARCHER equipment, the crew of a Civil Air Patrol GA8 Airvan may also include an operator of the ARCHER system, depending upon the requirements of the mission and the capabilities of the aircraft.

CAP owns over 1,000 vehicles (mostly vans for carrying personnel) and assigns them to units for use in the organization's missions. Members who use their own vehicles are reimbursed for fuel, oil and communications costs during a USAF-assigned emergency services mission.

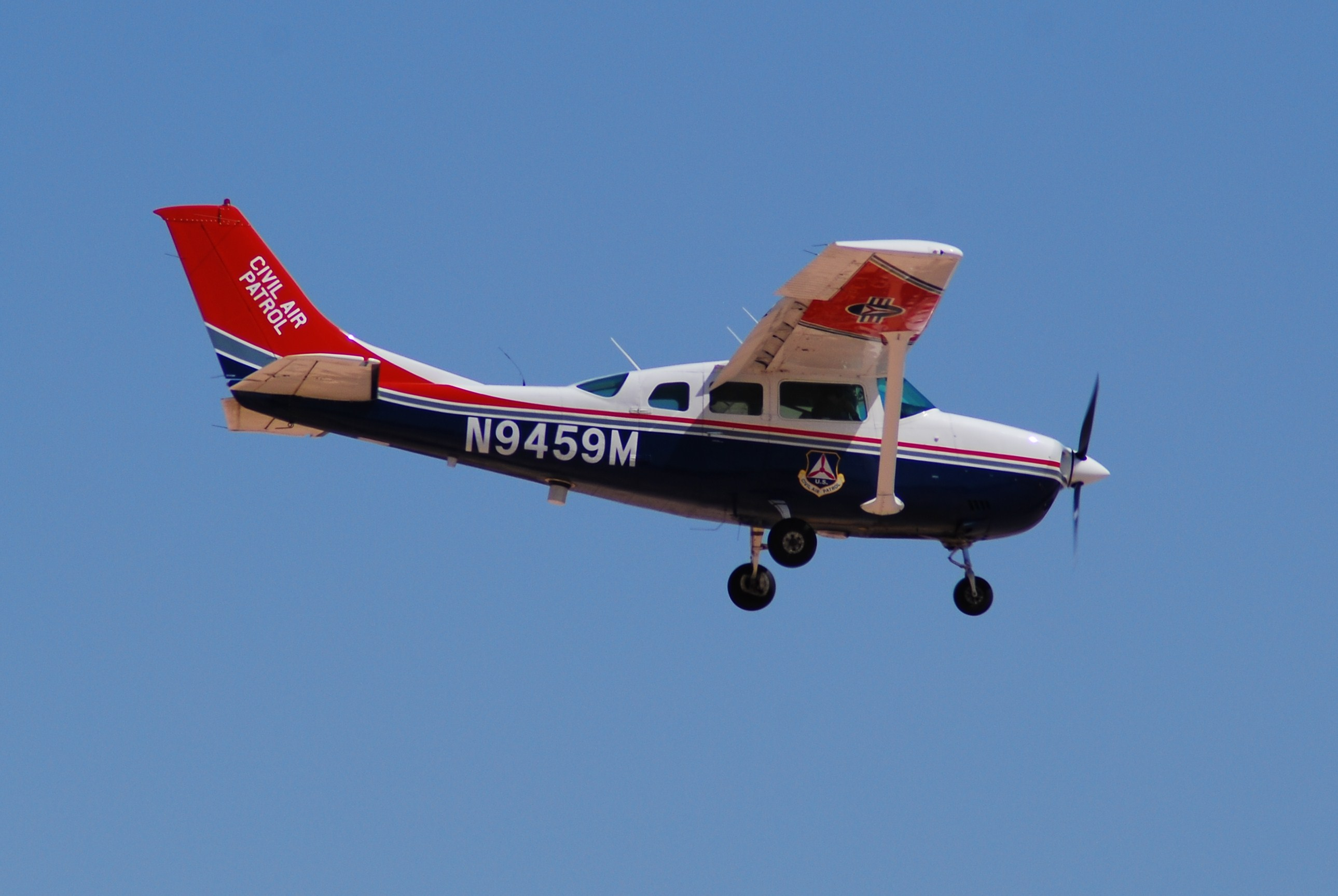
Civil Air Patrol Cessna 206

CAP operates a national radio network of HF (SSB) and VHF (FM) radio repeaters. There are over 500 of these repeaters strategically located across the United States. Radio communications are now facilitated under NTIA specifications, to which Civil Air Patrol directorates have applied even more stringent standards. CAP's radio network is designed for use during a national or regional emergency when existing telephone and Internet communications infrastructure is not available. Outside of such emergencies, most of CAP's internal communications are conducted on the Internet. CAP Units are allowed to use radio encryption when working with other agencies on sensitive missions, or when on a network that requires encryption.

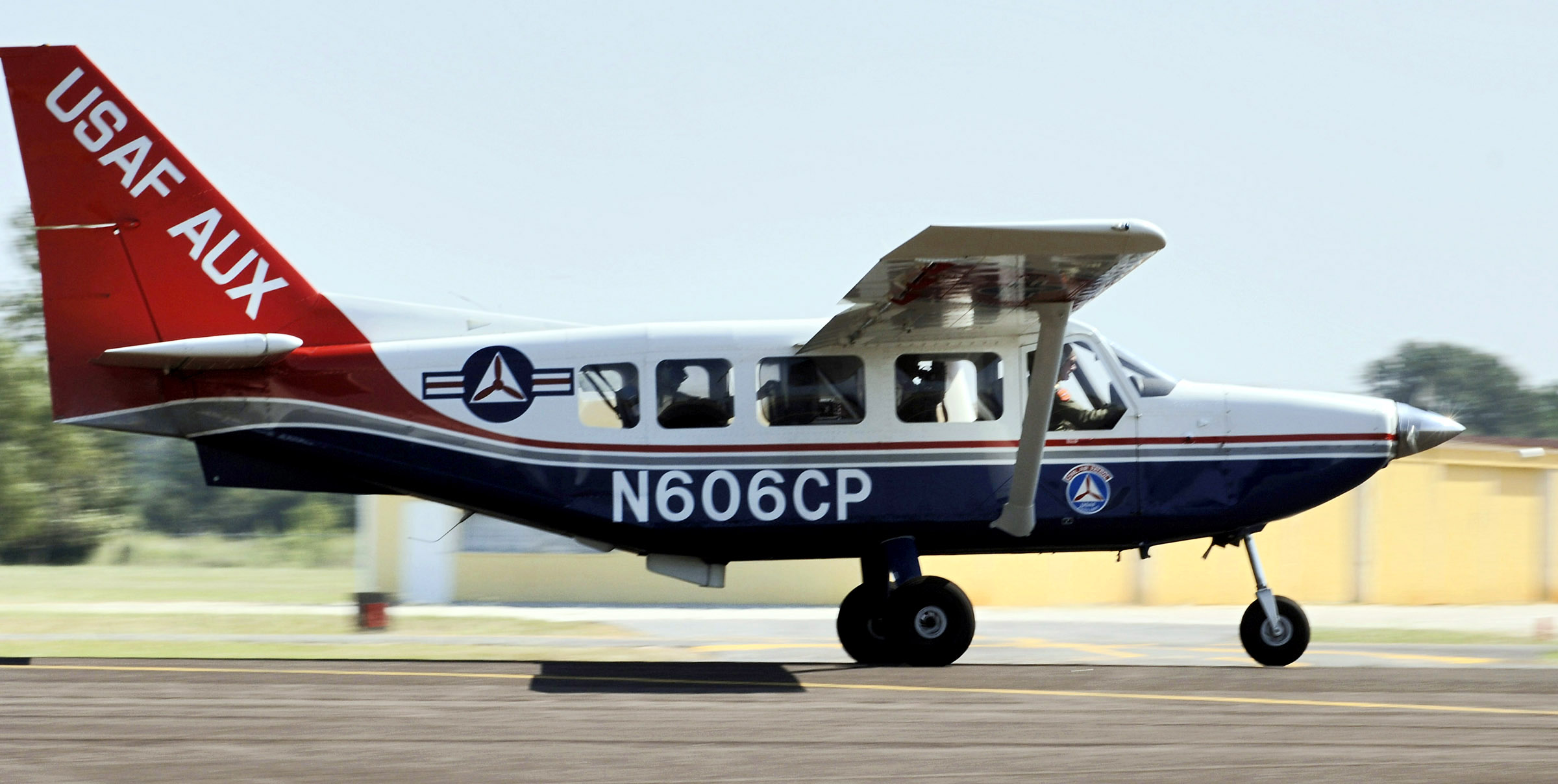
Civil Air Patrol GippsAero GA8

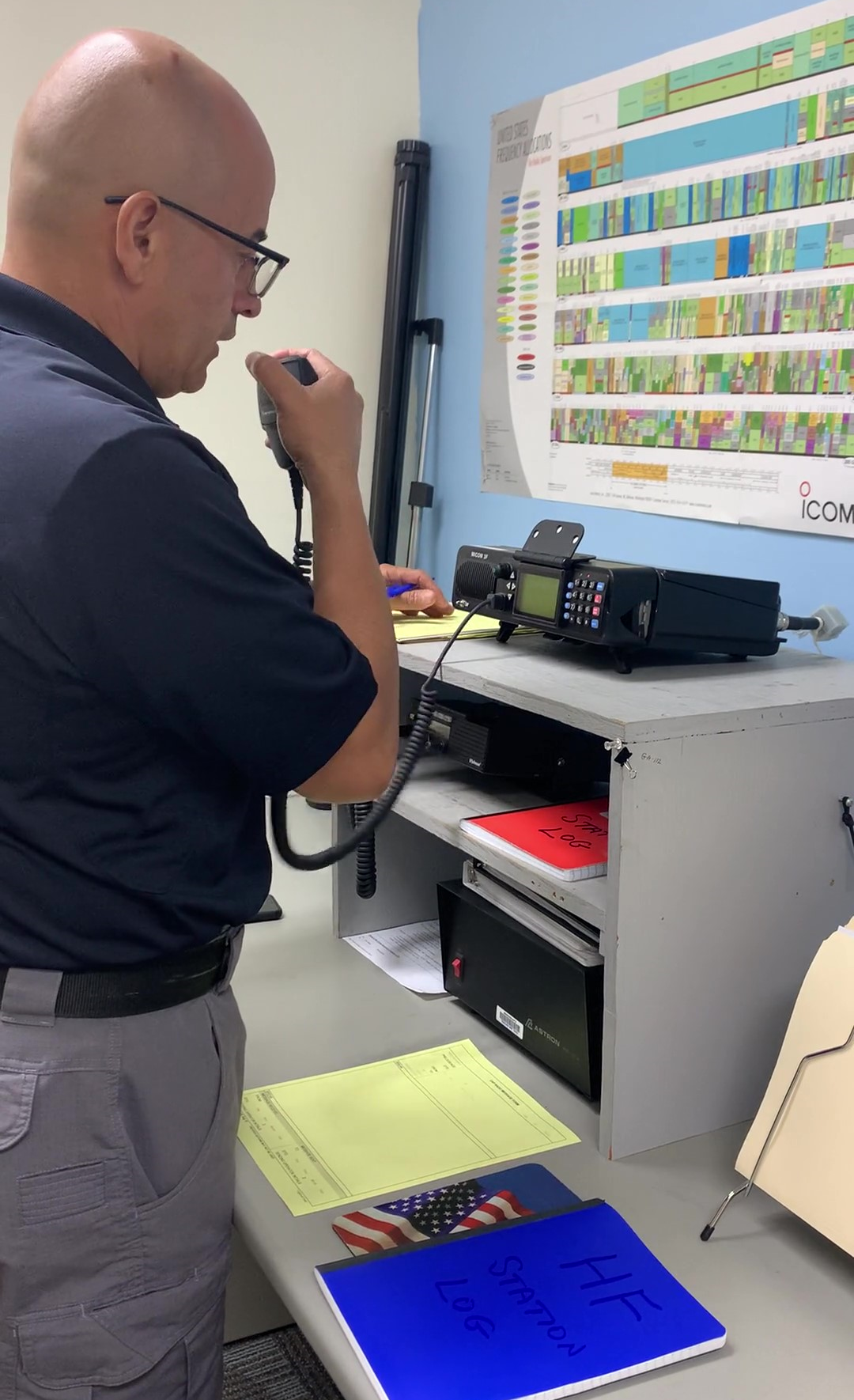
A senior member conducts an HF radio net

Some aircraft in the CAP fleet are equipped with the SDIS. This system allows CAP to send back real-time images of a disaster or crash site to anyone with an e-mail address, allowing the mission coordinators to make more informed decisions. There are approximately 100 federally funded SDIS systems strategically located across the United States, with more than 20 additional systems funded by state and local governments.

The ARCHER imaging system, mounted aboard the GA8 Airvan, uses visible and near-infrared light to examine the surface of the Earth and find suspected crash sites, evaluate areas affected by disasters, or examine foliage from an airborne perspective in order to flag possible marijuana plantations. Both the SDIS and ARCHER systems were used to great success in the response to Hurricane Katrina; ARCHER may be used in coordination with the SDIS system.

A hand-held radio direction finder, most commonly the L-Tronics Little L-Per, is used by ground teams to search for downed aircraft. The ground teams carry equipment on their person that they use while in the field. This equipment includes flashlights, signal mirrors, tactical vests, safety vests, and food that will last them at least 24 hours. The equipment carried by ground teams varies much by the mission at hand. Urban direction finding (UDF) missions necessitate only a small kit of gear. But intensive mountain search and rescue can require packs that provide for up to 72 hours of operational supplies and tools for the location, rescue and extraction of lost or crashed parties. This gear includes the above, plus additional water, meals, and survival gear. Although a standardized list is provided by the national command, many teams modify the list to match the needs of the mission.

Several states have legislation in place to help transfer surplus equipment to Civil Air Patrol. For example, Texas considers its wing a state agency, and therefore legally allowed to acquire surplus or salvage property, while Alaska has a program for transferring forfeited aircraft to the Alaska Wing.

== Funding ==
Civil Air Patrol is a non-profit corporation established by Public Law 79-476. It receives its funding from four major sources: membership dues, corporate donations, Congressional appropriations, and private donations.

Squadron and group financial support comes from donations and fundraising. Some units charge their own membership dues above and beyond CAP membership dues. These donations and fundraisers are how the squadrons and groups pay for their equipment, rent for facilities, and activities at the local level. A portion of funds are proceeds made during fundraisers. These are organized by individual squadrons and often include prizes for the cadets who sell the most tickets. Cadets that sell tickets will receive 50% of the proceeds they made in a personal CAP "bank" in that squadron. These funds do not transfer if a cadet transfers to a different squadron or wing.

Today, apart from member dues, Civil Air Patrol receives funding from donations and grants from individuals, foundations and corporations; from grants and payments from state governments for patrolling and other tasks as agreed by memorandums of understanding; and from federal funding for reimbursement of fuel, oil and maintenance plus capital expenses for aircraft, vehicles and communications equipment.

There are few paid positions in Civil Air Patrol. Most are located at National Headquarters, although some wings have paid administrators or accountants. During 2011, Civil Air Patrol had 182 paid employees.

== Notable members ==
- Margaret Bartholomew (charter member)
- Lorraine Denby
- Mary Feik (namesake of the Mary Feik Achievement award)
- Marianne Francois
- Maxwell Frost (cadet member)
- Jenean Hampton (lieutenant colonel)
- Dorothy Henry
- Kristi Noem (senior member)
- Meinhardt Raabe
- Ruth Reinhold (captain during WWII)

== See also ==
- Awards and decorations of Civil Air Patrol
- Civil Air Patrol National Cadet Competition
- Civil Air Patrol National Blue Beret
- United States Naval Sea Cadets Corps
- Cadets (youth program)
- Other search and rescue organizations
  - United States Coast Guard Auxiliary
  - State defense forces
  - Explorer Search and Rescue – Boy Scouts of America program
  - Civil Air Support – United Kingdom civil aviation program
