= National Cadet Special Activities =

Programs run by the Civil Air Patrol

National Cadet Special Activities (NCSA) are Cadet Programs conducted by the Civil Air Patrol. NCSAs are designed to give cadets direct hands on experience with various aspects of the Civil Air Patrol program and provide meaningful insight into several aviation-related careers. There are 46 different special activities that a cadet may attend as of 2021. Each activity is approximately a week long, and all but two are offered during the Summer.

The variety of NCSAs offered by CAP gives cadets a diverse experience. Activities focus on career exploration, leadership development, search and rescue skills, aeronautical training, Air Force familiarization, government, and a variety of other topics.

== Cadet Special Activities Ribbon ==
Cadet Special Activities ribbon

Awarded to cadets and officers who participate in National Cadet Special Activities. Participants must be identified by the Civil Air Patrol project officer and approved by the member's region commander. Each subsequent activity is represented by a bronze star affixed to the basic ribbon. Cadets earning this ribbon may continue to wear the ribbon as a Senior Member.

== Selection Process ==
Cadets are selected to attend NCSAs with a points-based scoring system. Before cadets will be scored, their Squadron Commander and Wing Commander must approve their applications to their chosen NCSAs. Some squadrons may implement interviews or have a conversation with cadets and their parents/guardians about that cadet's chosen NCSAs. After the list of NCSAs for the upcoming summer is published, interested cadets must file their application online at Civil Air Patrol's e-Services website. Cadets have until the 15th of January to file their applications. If a cadet wishes to attend more than one NCSA, the cadet should indicate each activity he or she wishes to attend, and rank them in order from highest to lowest. Cadets should indicate any activity in which they wish to participate, even if the dates overlap.

=== Scoring system ===
The Objective Scoring System was designed to evaluate cadets in a fair, impartial, and standardized manner. Cadets earn points based on their age, rank, years of service, and prior activities. A squadron commander's recommendation, also known as a "green light", will add 100 points to a cadet's score. Ties between cadets with the same score are broken by age. These scores are calculated on February 18, so changes made after February 18 (such as promotions or birthdays) are not accounted for.

Objective Scoring System
Age	Achievement	Longevity	Prior Activities	Green Light
18+ = 10 points	Spaatz = 20 points	5+ years = 15 points	None = 15 points	Yes = 100 points
17 = 8 pts	Eaker = 16 pts	4 years = 12 pts	1 Activity = 10 points	
16 = 6 pts	Earhart = 14 pts	3 years = 9 pts	2 activities = 5 pts	
15 = 4 pts	Mitchell = 12 pts	2 years = 5 pts	3+ activities = 0 pts	
14 = 3 pts	Wright Bros = 8 pts	1 year = 2 pts		
<14 = 0 pts	None = 0 pts	<1 years = 0 pts		

After cadets are scored, they are grouped together by their category. The highest scoring cadet is assigned to his or her highest desired NCSA, followed by the second highest scoring cadet, and so on, until all cadets have been assigned. Cadets are automatically assigned to their most desired activity that has space available. Although all cadets have a chance to be assigned, not every cadet will be assigned because of a limited number of spaces. Cadets who have not been selected for an activity will be marked as "alternates", and will be moved to "primary" status as vacancies open up according to their score. The list of alternates for an activity is commonly referred to as a "short list", and slotting from the short list is handled by the Activity Director.

=== Notification of Selection ===
On or about 1 March, cadets will be notified of their selection (or not) for each NCSA they applied for. Cadets are notified via the e-Services website.

Additionally, activity directors should contact their participants by 1 April and provide further information about the activity. Cadets must pay activity fees by 15 April or risk losing their slot to an alternate.

== List of NCSAs for 2021 ==
On 6 June 2020, Civil Air Patrol released a list of activities for 2021.

Activity	Location	Category
National Character and Leadership Symposium	Virtual - Hosted by the United States Air Force Academy	Leadership
Northeast Region Cadet Leadership School	Virtual	Leadership
Alaska Wing Glider Flight Academy	Clear Space Force Station, AK	Flight
Alaska Wing Powered Flight Academy	Clear Space Force Station, AK	Flight
Shirley Martin Powered Flight Academy	Nacogdoches, TX	Flight
Northcentral Region Glider Flight Academy	Yoder, KS	Flight
Northcentral Region Powered Flight Academy	Fremont, NE	Flight
Great Lakes Region Powered Flight Academy	Oshkosh, WI	Flight
Space Command Familiarization Course	Peterson Air Force Base, CO	Air Force
Desert Scorpion Search and Rescue Academy	Wendover Army Airfield, UT	Operations Training
Engineering Technologies Academy (Robotics Focus)	United States Air Force Academy, CO	Technology
Pacific Region and Rocky Mountain Region Joint Honor Academy	United States Air Force Academy, CO	Air Force
LtCol Raymond Johnson Flight Academy	Columbus, IN	Flight
Northeast Region Glider Flight Academy	Fredericksburg, PA	Flight
Southwest Region Powered Flight Academy	Shawnee, OK	Flight
Air Force Civil Engineering Academy	Tyndall Air Force Base, FL	Air Force
National Cyber Academy (VA)	Hampton Roads, VA	Air Force
Engineering Technologies Academy	Virtual	Technology
Robert Ayres Solo and Ground Academy	Hagerstown, MD	Flight
National Virtual Private Pilot Ground School	Virtual	Flight
Southwest Region Glider Flight Academy	Clovis, NM	Flight
Utah Wing Powered Flight Academy	West Jordan, UT	Flight
National Cadet Competition	Wright State University, OH	Leadership
Southeast Region Glider Flight Academy	Tullahoma, TN	Flight
Air Force Specialized Undergraduate Pilot Training (MS)	Columbus Air Force Base, MS	Air Force
Falcon Powered Flight Academy	Joint Base McGuire-Dix-Lakehurst, NJ	Flight
Hawk Mountain Search and Rescue School	Kempton, PA	Operations Training
Texas Wing Powered Flight Academy	Waller, TX	Flight
Aircraft Maintenance and Manufacturing Academy	Wichita, KS	Aviation
Col Roland Butler Powered Flight Academy	Camden, SC	Flight
New Hampshire Wing Non-Commissioned Officer School	Norwich University, NH	Leadership
National Blue Beret	Oshkosh, WI	Leadership
Desert Eagle Flight Academy	Ephrata, WA	Flight
Space Command Familiarization Course	Patrick Air Force Base, FL	Air Force
National Cyber Academy (TX)	San Antonio, TX	Air Force
Great Lakes Region Cybersecurity Academy	Virtual	Technology
Mid-Atlantic Region Honor Guard Academy	Camp Pendleton (Virginia)	Air Force
Air Force Specialized Undergraduate Pilot Training (TX)	Laughlin Air Force Base, TX	Air Force
Civic Leadership Academy	Virtual	Leadership
Air Force Pararescue and Survival Orientation Course	Kirtland Air Force Base, NM	Air Force
Air Force Advanced Pararescue and Survival Orientation Course	Davis Monthan Air Force Base, AZ	Air Force
Cadet Aviation Ground School	Virtual	Flight
Cadet Officer School	Maxwell Air Force Base	Leadership
International Air Cadet Exchange	World-Wide	Leadership
National Emergency Services Academy	Camp Atterbury, IN	Operations Training
