= National Congress on Aviation and Space Education =

The National Congress on Aviation and Space Education is an annual conference sponsored by Civil Air Patrol designed to enhance and expand educational opportunities and support for teachers throughout the United States. The event is co-sponsored with the Federal Aviation Administration and NASA.
