= Antonio J. Pineda =

American military officer

Antonio J. Pineda Jr.
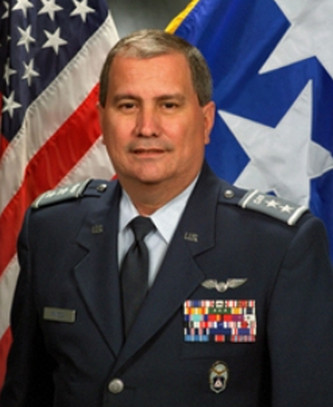
- Spouse: Rose Pineda
- Military career
- Allegiance: United States
- Branch: Florida Army National Guard; Civil Air Patrol
- Service years: 1988—2007
- Rank: Major General, CAP
- Nickname: Tony
- Commands: CAP National Commander; Southeast Region Commander; Florida Wing Commander
- Awards: Distinguished Service Medal; Exceptional Service Award; Meritorious Service Award

Antonio "Tony" Pineda Jr. is a retired American law enforcement officer and, formerly, the 19th national commander of the Civil Air Patrol (CAP) from 2005 to 2007. The national commander is the most-senior official and commanding officer of Civil Air Patrol (CAP) — a non-profit corporation that is congressionally chartered to operate as the civilian auxiliary of the United States Air Force. The national commander also serves as the chief executive officer of CAP.

Prior to acceding to the role of national commander, Pineda served as the commander of CAP's Florida Wing (1998–2001) as well as the commander of the "Southeast Region" (2001–2004), and the national vice commander (2004–2005). Pineda was a police officer and detective for the Hollywood, Florida police department from 1972 to 1980, at which time he became a special agent with the Florida Department of Law Enforcement, retiring from the FDLE in 2007. Pineda served in the Florida Army National Guard for a time post-high school.

The Civil Air Patrol Board of governors removed Pineda as national commander after investigating complaints that a subordinate CAP member took Air Force tests for him. Pineda denies the allegations.

== Civil Air Patrol ==
=== Background ===
He began his Civil Air Patrol career as a member of the West Broward Composite Squadron in 1988. Pineda completed all levels of the CAP professional development program, including the Paul Garber, Grover Loening, Charles Yeager Aerospace Education and Gill Robb Wilson awards. He attended both the Southeast Region Staff College and the National Staff College. He is also a graduate of the National Commanders Course.

=== Timeline ===
1988-1989: Joined CAP
1989-1996: Group commander, South Florida
1996-1998: Florida Wing vice commander
1998-2001: Florida Wing commander
2001-2004: Southeast Region commander
2004-2005; National Vice commander
2005-2007: National Commander of the Civil Air Patrol — Removed by the board of governors.

== Controversy ==
In 2007 the Civil Air Patrol board of governors voted to suspend Pineda, owing to allegations that he had a subordinate, Ray Hayden, take various U.S. Air Force exams for him (for courses on security and leadership, among others). The accusations were investigated by the CAP inspector general. Later in 2007, after the inspector general issued their report, the board of governors voted to remove Pineda from office.

== Law enforcement background ==
Pineda began his professional career in 1972 as a police officer and later a detective with the Hollywood, FL Police Department. Pineda became a special agent with the Florida Department of Law Enforcement in 1980 where he would serve until his retirement in 2007.
