= Civil Air Patrol National Cadet Competition =

National Cadet Competition
- Venue: Wright State University
- Location: Dayton, Ohio
- Competitors: 8 CAP regions
- Teams: 16 Teams (2 per CAP region)

The Civil Air Patrol National Cadet Competition (NCC) program ran from 1974 to 2023. In 2023, the Civil Air Patrol decided to no longer hold a NCC event in Dayton each summer. Instead, the eight regional winners will be announced and celebrated at the national level.

== Cadet Competition Format (2015–2023) ==
The recently ended Civil Air Patrol National Cadet Competition program has been redesigned into a new format combining both drill team and color guard aspects into one competition. Core Events include: Inspection, Written Exam, Physical Fitness, Team Leadership Problem(s), Standard Color Guard Drill, Standard Element Drill, Indoor Posting of the Colors, and Outdoor Posting of the Colors.

The new curriculum's mission statement states: "The CAP National Cadet Competition program showcases the full range of challenges in cadet life experienced at the squadron level, and new areas of learning that are important to America." As a result, the competition has added several new elective competitive components to reflect the CAP Cadet Program, such as: rocketry, public speaking (extemporaneous, impromptu), geocaching, robotics, community service project, Jeopardy, Panel Quiz, Unmanned aerial vehicle (UAS), and Obstacle courses. Elective Components differ from year to year and are chosen at the discretion of the Activity Director.

=== Qualification ===
All 52 wings and 8 regions host a Cadet Competition each year in order to decide which team will ultimately represent their wings and regions, respectively. Specifically, the winning team and runner-up for each wing represent their respective wing at the regional competition. At the regional competition, the winner andrunner-up receive a slot to represent their region at the National Cadet Competition. NCC continues to be the most prestigious and elite competition Civil Air Patrol has to offer.

=== Team composition and eligibility ===
==== Eligibility ====
The NCC program is open to all cadet and composite squadrons. There are no special age or cadet grade requirements.

==== Team composition ====
Teams consist of six cadets, with one cadet serving as Team Commander. There are no alternates. The cadets must also have two escorts, with one eligible to drive a CAP vehicle.

Multi-squadron teams: Teams may draw cadets from a maximum of two squadrons.

== Competitive events (2015–present) ==
CAPP 60–75 - To fulfill its mission and vision, the NCC program consists of six core performance events for teams and numerous elective events for individuals and small groups. The elective events are randomized each year by the NCC Director for variety, resource, and availability purposes.

Core events
Leadership	Indoor posting of the colors	(4-cadet color guard)
	Outdoor posting of the colors	(3-cadet color guard)
	Team leadership problem	
	Standard Drill	(4 - Cadet Color guard) (6 - Cadet Element)
Aerospace	Written exam	
Fitness	Physical Fitness Test	Mile Run, Sit Ups, Push Ups, Curl Ups
Character	Uniform Inspection	Preparation and Spot Inspections

Elective events
Leadership	Public Speaking	Extemporaneous and/or Impromptu (one cadet per speech)
Aerospace	Panel Quiz	(4 cadet team)
	Robotics	(6 cadet team)
	Rocketry	(2 cadet team)
	Unmanned aerial vehicle	(4 cadet team)
Fitness	Obstacle Course	(4 cadet team)
	ELT Search	(6 cadet team)
Character	Service Project	(2 cadet team)

== Awards ==
=== Trophy ===
The USAF Chief of Staff Outstanding Cadet Team Championship Trophy is presented to the most outstanding overall team, based on performance in both the core and the elective events. The Air Force Chief of Staff, General David C. Jones, USAF approved of this award and authorized it in the name of all Air Force Chiefs of Staff on 26 April 1978. Hence, the trophy has been nicknamed "Jonesy." The trophy displays every winning team named by region since its creation.

The trophy is at display at National Headquarters Civil Air Patrol, in Maxwell Air Force Base.

National Cadet Competition Color Guard Ribbon

=== NCC Ribbon ===
Until further notice, participation at NCC garners the "green" National Color Guard Competition Ribbon, IAW CAPR 39-3, § 20-c.

The National Color Guard Competition Ribbon is awarded for participation in the National Color Guard Competition. Senior members who earned this ribbon as a cadet may continue to wear the ribbon.

1. The basic ribbon will be worn by cadets who are the winner of the wing competition and/or cadets selected to represent the wing at a region competition.
2. A bronze star will be affixed for the winners of the region competition, and a silver star will be worn by the sweepstakes winner of the national competition. Repetitive awards may be recognized by wearing additional stars in the appropriate competition level.
3. The ribbon may also be awarded to a maximum of three senior members per team, who were responsible for escorting, chaperoning and training their respective teams at the wing, region and national level competitions.

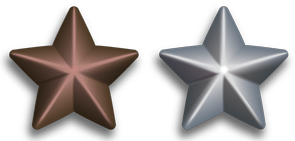
NCC Ribbon Service Stars

==== Rarity of Star Device(s) ====
- 96 Cadets will earn the Bronze Star Device (Region Champions) on the NCC Ribbon Annually.
- Only 6 cadets earn the Silver Star (National Champions) Device on the NCC Ribbon Annually. Statistically, less than .0003% in the entire CAP Cadet Corps. Making it one of the rarest and most prestigious devices in the Civil Air Patrol.

NCSA Ribbon

=== NCSA Ribbon ===
Cadet and Senior Members who serve as Logistical Staff, and Judges for the entirety of the NCC Activity earn the National Cadet Special Activity Ribbon.

== Pamphlet ==
The National Cadet Competition will utilize CAPP 60–75.

== Winners (2015–present) ==
National Cadet Competition Champions (New format: 2015–present)
Year	Venue	Region	Wing	Charter	Squadron	Team name	Team commander	Head coach/escort
2015	Maxwell AFB	SER	FLWG	FL-016	Coral Springs Cadet Squadron	Spartans	C/TSgt Kenneth Lasseter	Capt Luz Levin, CAP
2016	No competition took place in 2016.							
2017	Wright State University	SER	PRWG	PR-126	Muñiz ANGB Cadet Squadron	Buccaneers PR126	C/Lt Col. Kevin E. Negron	Lt Col Ismael Rodriguez, CAP
2018	Wright State University	SER	FLWG	FL-458	Wesley Chapel Cadet Squadron	Wesley Chapel Knights	C/1st Lt Cassie Ramer	1st Lt Cesar Alayon, CAP
2019	Wright State University	SER	FLWG	FL-458	Wesley Chapel Cadet Squadron	Wesley Chapel Knights	C/Maj Cassie Ramer	1st Lt Cesar Alayon, CAP
2020	Competition canceled due to Covid-19 pandemic restrictions.							
2021	Competition canceled due to Covid-19 pandemic restrictions.							
2022	Wright State University	SER	FLWG	FL-458	Wesley Chapel Cadet Squadron	Wesley Chapel Knights	C/Capt Maria Granados	1st Lt Sandra Weiss, CAP
2023	Wright State University	SER	PRWG	PR-123	Dr. Cesareo Rosa-Nieves Cadet Squadron		C/Lt Col Rayesh Figueroa	Lt Col Felix Davila, CAP
2024	No competition will take place in 2024.							

== (NCC) National Cadet Competition facts, records, and statistics (1974–present) ==
- To date, the 2002 Florida Wing Color Guard was the only team to win first place in every event at NCC.
- Puerto Rico Wing from the Southeast Region boasts the most participations and qualifications to NCC in NCC history since its inception in 1974.
- Only five wings in history have been home to BOTH a NDTC and a NCGC Champion Team; Puerto Rico, Arizona, California, New York and Utah.
- Dr. Cesareo Rosa Nieves Cadet Squadron (SER-PR-123), from the Puerto Rico Wing in the Southeast Region, is the only squadron to have been home to a National Champion Drill Team, National Champion Color Guard and National Cadet Competition Champion (Drill team in 2004, 2007, and 2011. Color Guard in 2012. NCC in 2023). This Squadron also has the most participations on record for all NCGC, NDTC, and NCC competitions.
- Only one cadet has commanded more than one team to a National Drill Team Championship. That was C/Col Jose Figueroa, from NER-NJWG, in 1992, 1993, and 1994.
- To date, only one cadet has commanded more than one team to a National Cadet Competition Championship. That was C/Col Cassie Ramer from FLWG in 2018 and 2019.
- To date, the most successful coach/escort under the new NCC construct is Capt Cesar Alayon of the FLWG with three consecutive NCC Championships (2018, 2019, 2022) as a coach/escort.
- Only one team has won three consecutive National Drill Team Championships. That team was NER-NJWG in 1992, 1993, and 1994.
- Only one team has won three consecutive National Cadet Competition Championships. That team was Knights of SER-FL-458 in 2018, 2019, 2022. Due to the Competition Being postponed as a result of restrictions of the Covid-19 Pandemic, the 2022 championship is considered a consecutive win.
- Under the new combined 2015 format, Southeast Region remains the only region to win at NCC with 5 consecutive wins.

== Former National Cadet Competition Drill Team (NDTC) & Color Guard (NCGC) format ==
The Civil Air Patrol National Cadet Competition (CAPP 52–4 2009 curriculum) was the highest echelon of competition for Civil Air Patrol (CAP) Drill Teams and Color Guards, including all 52 Wings and 8 regions of the CAP. Annually, each of the 52 CAP wings hosted a competition to decide one drill team and one color guard winner to represent their wing to their respective regional competition. Wing Competitions were normally held anywhere from December to March and region competitions were usually held anywhere from April to May, with the winning drill team and color guard representing their respective region at the National Cadet Competition held every summer. Only one drill team and one color guard was able to represent their region at the NCC, making NCC the most elite competition CAP had to offer. The winning NCC teams were awarded the United States Air Force Chief of Staff Sweepstakes Award Trophy, with their wing name being added to the trophy's display. To add to its prestige, each NCC winner was awarded a silver star which was added to their drill team or color guard ribbon. The final National Cadet Competition, the 2013 National Cadet Competition (NCC), was held July 17 through July 20 in Dayton, Ohio at Wright State University and Stebbins High School. Since 2013, the NCC has been canceled and changed to reflect the new direction of the CAP Cadet Program. For more information on the new NCC program, please visit: https://www.capmembers.com/cadet_programs/activities/national_cadet_competition/

2013 National Drill Team Competition winners:

- Southeast Region - Tennessee Wing and Great Lakes Region - Ohio Wing

(Due to a discrepancy in the recording of times in the mile run event, it was not possible to determine an overall competition winner. Should the SER have won the mile run, they would have been crowned overall champion. Should the GLR have won the mile run, they would have been tied with SER at 14 overall points. According to the old NCC format, where two teams tied, the tiebreaker was the teams' placement in the written exam. In this case, GLR would have been crowned champions based on a tiebreaker. Since officials were unable to correct the discrepancy in the mile run, both teams were crowned champions in 2013).

2013 National Color Guard Competition winners:

- Rocky Mountain Region - Utah Wing

2013 National Drill Team Competition results
Region	Wing	Inspection	Standard	Innovative	Written	Panel Quiz	Mile Run	Volleyball	Points	Overall
SER	TN	1	3	1	4	1	1 or 2	2	13	1st or 2nd
MER	NC	6	4	5	2	2	3	5	27	4th
RMR	CO	4	5	6	6	4	5	4	34	5th
PCR	CA	2	2	3	3	6	4	3	23	3rd
NER	NJ	5	6	4	5	3	6	6	35	6th
GLR	OH	3	1	2	1	5	2 or 1	1	15	2nd or 1st
SWR	None	8	8	8	8	8	8	8	56	8th
NCR	None	8	8	8	8	8	8	8	56	8th

2013 National Color Guard Competition results
Region	Wing	Inspection	Standard	Indoor	Outdoor	Written	Panel Quiz	Mile Run	Points	Overall
SER	FL	4	7	6	1	6	4	4	32	3rd
MER	MD	5	6	1	7	1	8	7	35	7th
RMR	UT	1	3	7	5	3	1	2	22	1st
PCR	CA	2	8	1	4	7	3	1	26	2nd
NER	NJ	3	1	3	8	8	5	5	33	5th
GLR	WI	6	5	5	2	4	7	6	35	8th
SWR	TX	7	2	4	6	5	6	3	33	4th
NCR	NE	8	3	8	3	2	2	8	34	6th

Photos and full results from the 2013 NCC can be found here:

2013 NCC results

The wings who represented their regions to the 2013 National Cadet Competition were as follows:

2013 National Cadet Competition teams
Region	Drill Team	Color Guard
Southeast	Tennessee	Florida
Middle East	North Carolina	Maryland
Rocky Mountain	Colorado	Utah
Pacific	California	California
Northeast	New Jersey	New Jersey
Great Lakes	Ohio	Wisconsin
Southwest		Texas
North Central		Nebraska

2013 Schedule and Directions

The results from the 2012 NCC can be found here: http://www.kalemis.com/ncc/index.html

All previous year's winners can be found here: https://web.archive.org/web/20121201032344/http://www.ncsas.com/ncc_winners/

== International Drill Competition ==
In 1947, based upon the cadet training program which required proficiency in standard drill "without arms," General Lucas V. Beau, Civil Air Patrol's National Commander, instituted the National Drill Competition. Rules were drafted by the US Drill Competition Committee, United States Air Force Ceremonial Detachment located at Bolling AFB, Washington DC and practices used by the Army ROTC program.

Major General Lucas Victor Beau, Commanding General of the Civil Air Patrol, was a well-known figure with countries having aviation cadet programs or showing an interest in establishing one. General Beau was well liked and had a longtime association with the Air Cadet League of Canada, an organization started in 1939 and one that the CAP Cadet program was modeled after when it began in October 1942.

Beau was attending a planning meeting in April 1947 in Canada to help organize the first International Air Cadet Exchange program which was to start in the summer of 1948 between the United States and Canada. When it was mentioned that CAP was establishing a National Drill Competition along the lines of the annual drill competition and exhibition that was held in Canada for the Air League. A point was made that the CAP Cadets were excellent marchers, and the Canadians counted that they too were suburb drill men; thus, a challenge.

Beau donated in 1948 for presentation at the first meet held in conjunction with the New York City Jubilee at Idlewild Airport Jamaica, Long Island, a heavy Sterling Silver trophy which is shaped in the form of the circular CAP Shoulder patch, it is 12 inches in diameter and 1 inch thick, the top of the circle is an arc with engraved relief block letters that spell out the words "CIVIL AIR PATROL". The trophy center piece is a highly polished raised isosceles triangle set on a circular blue background with raised 1/4-inch border; within its center is a raised red three-bladed propeller, and the raised block letters "US" is centered on the lower half of the blue. The circular emblem is mounted on an 18-inch-long (460 mm) by 6-inch-wide (150 mm) and 2-inch-high (51 mm) base, which has across its front and back sides three raised triangles, each end has two triangles, for a total of 10 triangles all around, on each of these triangles is engraved the year (above) and the country (below) of the winner, i.e. "1949 CANADA".

== Winners of the IDC ==
Winners of the International Drill Competition
Year	Location	City/state	Team	Score	Team Commander
1948	Idlewild Airport exhibition	Long Island, NY	CAN	28.5	F/Sgt Ralph Cyr
			US	26.5	Sgt George Cohn
1949	Canadian National Exhibition	Toronto, Ontario	CAN	358	WO1 Williams Stewart
			US	347	Sgt Arthur Barton
1950	Canadian National Exhibition	Des Moines, IA	CAN	374	WO2 John Morrison
			US	367	
1951	Canadian National Exhibition	Toronto, Ontario	UK	367	F/Sgt R. Kyle Exhibition
			CAN	362	L. Tighe
			US	360	Capt I. B. Abrams
1952	Canadian National Exhibition	St. Paul, MN 123	US	1143	Capt Jorge Luis Montalvo
			CAN	1108	WO Donald G. Barnes
1953	Canadian National Exhibition	Toronto, Ontario	CAN		Sgt. R.J. Chalmers
			US		Capt David Payne
1954	Minnesota State Fair	Minneapolis, MN	US	1012	Capt Gomez
			CAN	966	WO P.R. Murray
1955	Canadian National Exhibition	Toronto, Ontario	CAN	1130	WO James Goodhand
			US	1114	Capt Rafael Lugo
1956	Minnesota State Fair	Minneapolis, MN	CAN		WO Roy Lauritsen
			US		Capt Edwin Lopez
1957	Canadian National Exhibition	Toronto, Ontario	US		Capt David P. Kalani III
			CAN		WO James Jackson

== Winners of the National Competition ==
The National Drill Competition was governed by its original rules from 1948 to 1965. Between 1948 and 1959, the winners of the competition were awarded the Colonel George A. Stone CAP Trophy. From 1960, until the final National Drill Competition under the original rules was held in 1965, the trophy was given no name.

The winners of the National Drill Competition under its original rules are listed below.

National Drill Competition
Year	Location	City	State	Winning region	Winning wing	Team commander
1948	Mitchell, AFB	Long Island	NY	Northeast Region	New York Wing	C/Sgt George Cohn
1949	Lowry AFB	Denver	CO	Northeast Region	New Jersey Wing	C/Sgt Arthur Barton
1950	Lowry AFB	Denver	CO	Rocky Mountain Region	Utah Wing	C/Sgt
1951	Andrews AFB	Prince George's Co	MD	Northeast Region	New York Wing	C/Capt I. B. Abrams
1952	Mitchell, AFB	Long Island	NY	Southeast Region	Puerto Rico Wing	C/Capt Jorge Montalvo
1953	Mitchell, AFB	Long Island	NY	Northeast Region	New York Wing	C/Capt Andrew O'Rourke
1954	Minneapolis-St. Paul AFB	Minneapolis	MN	Southeast Region	Puerto Rico Wing	C/Capt Francisco Toledo
1955	Clinton County AFB	Willmington	OH	Southeast Region	Puerto Rico Wing	C/Capt Samuel Colon
1956	Amarillo AFB	Amarillo	TX	Rocky Mountain Region	Utah Wing	C/Lt Roy Cundick
1957	Rockefeller Center	New York	NY	Pacific Region	Hawaii Wing	C/Capt David P. Kalani III
1958	Rockefeller Center	New York	NY	Northeast Region	New York Wing	C/Capt Henry Olynik
1959	Rockefeller Center	New York	NY	Pacific Region	Hawaii Wing	C/Capt David P. Kalani III
1960	USAF Academy	Colorado Springs	CO	Rocky Mountain Region	Colorado Wing	C/MSgt Barbara Sell
1961	USAF Academy	Colorado Springs	CO	Rocky Mountain Region	Colorado Wing	C/Lt Barbara Sell
1962	USAF Academy	Colorado Springs	CO	Great Lakes Region	Michigan Wing	C/Col Douglas C. Roach
1963	USAF Academy	Colorado Springs	CO	Great Lakes Region	Michigan Wing	C/Daniel Weaver
1964	USAF Academy	Colorado Springs	CO	Southwest Region	Texas Wing	C/Alex Rocha
1965	USAF Academy	Colorado Springs	CO	Great Lakes Region	Michigan Wing	C/Martin Smith

From 1966 to 1973, no National Drill Competition was held. The efforts of the National Commander's Committee on Cadet Programs (1971 to 1975) was instrumental in reestablishing and developing the National Cadet Competition, which, besides drill and inspection added physical fitness, and knowledge of aerospace education to its curriculum. Originally it was to be called the National Cadet Olympics and later renamed in 1975 to the National Cadet Competition. The first was held in Dallas, Texas in 1974.

From 1974 to 1977, the winners of the competition were presented a trophy given under no name. In 1978 the CAP-USAF Commander, Brigadier General Paul E. Gardner, in a memorandum, recommended the use of Civil Air Patrol Corporate funds, in the amount of $1,000, to rename and establish the USAF Chief of Staff Sweepstakes Award Trophy as recognition of the national champions. The National Executive Committee of CAP approved on 4 March 1978.

The Air Force Chief of Staff at the time, General David C. Jones, USAF, approved of this award and authorized it in the name of all Air Force Chiefs of Staff on 26 April 1978.

In 1996, the National Cadet Competition was split into two distinct competitions: the National Drill Team Competition and the National Color Guard Competition.

The winners of the National Drill Team Competition are listed below.

National Drill Team Competition (1974–2013)
Year	Location	City	State	Winning region	Winning wing	Team commander
1974	Dallas Love Field	Dallas	TX	Middle East Region	North Carolina Wing	C/2LT Erbie James
1975	Maxwell AFB	Montgomery	AL	Southwest Region	Texas Wing	
1976	Maxwell AFB	Montgomery	AL	Southeast Region	Georgia Wing	C/Capt Tim Dearman
1977	Maxwell AFB	Montgomery	AL	Southeast Region	Georgia Wing	C/WO Mark Bebo
1978	Maxwell AFB	Montgomery	AL	Middle East Region	North Carolina Wing	C/Col William McGalliard
1979	Maxwell AFB	Montgomery	AL	Middle East Region	North Carolina Wing	C/Capt Hugh W. Carter
1980	Maxwell AFB	Montgomery	AL	Northeast Region	New York Wing	C/Lt Michael Spencer
1981	Maxwell AFB	Montgomery	AL	Pacific Region	California Wing	C/Maj Amy Creczyn
1982	Maxwell AFB	Montgomery	AL	Northeast Region	New York Wing	C/Capt Hector Marcayda
1983	Maxwell AFB	Montgomery	AL	Great Lakes Region	Illinois Wing	C/Lt Col Drew Savage
1984	Maxwell AFB	Montgomery	AL	Northeast Region	New York Wing	C/Capt Mark Springer
1985	Maxwell AFB	Montgomery	AL	Northeast Region	New York Wing	C/Capt Domingo Torres
1986	Maxwell AFB	Montgomery	AL	Pacific Region	California Wing	
1987	Maxwell AFB	Montgomery	AL	Pacific Region	California Wing	C/Capt Robert Hagberg
1988	Maxwell AFB	Montgomery	AL	Northeast Region	New York Wing	C/Lt Col Clement Stewart
1989	Maxwell AFB	Montgomery	AL	Northeast Region	New Jersey Wing	C/Capt Darin Ford
1990	Maxwell AFB	Montgomery	AL	Northeast Region	New Jersey Wing	C/Col Steven H. Drollinger
1991	Maxwell AFB	Montgomery	AL	Northeast Region	New York Wing	C/Col Sayedoul Rahman
1992	Maxwell AFB	Montgomery	AL	Northeast Region	New Jersey Wing	C/Col Jose M. Figueroa
1993	Maxwell AFB	Montgomery	AL	Northeast Region	New Jersey Wing	C/Col Jose M. Figueroa
1994	Maxwell AFB	Montgomery	AL	Northeast Region	New Jersey Wing	C/Col Jose M. Figueroa
1995	Maxwell AFB	Montgomery	AL	Southwest Region	Louisiana Wing	C/Col Richard Muffoletto
1996	Maxwell AFB	Montgomery	AL	Great Lakes Region	Illinois Wing	C/Col Joseph Martinez
1997	Maxwell AFB	Montgomery	AL	Northeast Region	New Jersey Wing	C/FO Walead Latif
1998	Maxwell AFB	Montgomery	AL	Southwest Region	Louisiana Wing	C/Brior Lecompte
1999	Maxwell AFB	Montgomery	AL	Southwest Region	Louisiana Wing	C/Maj Michele Robichaux
2000	Rescheduled					
2001	USAF Academy	Colorado Springs	CO	Northeast Region	Massachusetts Wing	C/Col Peter Amaral
2002	USAF Academy	Colorado Springs	CO	Northeast Region	New York Wing	C/Lt Col Adam Cucchiara
2003	Wright State University	Dayton	OH	Middle East Region	Delaware Wing	C/Col Jonathan Offen
2004	Wright State University	Dayton	OH	Southeast Region	Puerto Rico Wing	C/Col Jonathan Vazquez
2005	Udvar-Hazy Center, Smithsonian Museum	Washington	DC	Northeast Region	New York Wing	C/Lt Col Erik Johnson
2006	Udvar-Hazy Center, Smithsonian Museum	Washington	DC	Southwest Region	Arizona Wing	C/Col Cameron Philips
2007	National Museum of the United States Air Force	Dayton	OH	Southeast Region	Puerto Rico Wing	C/Lt Col Luis Colon
2008	Wright State University	Dayton	OH	Southwest Region	Arizona Wing	C/Col Jamie Hurley
2009	Evergreen Aviation & Space Museum	McMinnville	OR	Rocky Mountain Region	Utah Wing	C/Lt Col Cheston Newhall
2010	Evergreen Aviation & Space Museum	McMinnville	OR	Rocky Mountain Region	Utah Wing	C/1stLt Zach Hopkins
2011	Wright State University	Dayton	OH	Southeast Region	Puerto Rico Wing	C/Lt Col Hector J. Rodriguez
2012	Wright State University	Dayton	OH	Southwest Region	Texas Wing	C/Maj Joshua Phillips
2013	Wright State University	Dayton	OH	Southeast Region (potentially tied with Great Lakes Region)	Tennessee Wing AND Ohio Wing	C/Lt Col Caleb Brinegar AND C/Capt Nathaniel Forrider

The winners of the National Color Guard Competition are listed below.

National Color Guard Competition (1996–2013)
Year	Location	City	State	Winning Wing	Winning Region	Team Commander
1996	Maxwell AFB	Montgomery	AL	Oklahoma Wing	Southwest Region	
1997	Maxwell AFB	Montgomery	AL	Indiana Wing	Great Lakes Region	
1998	Maxwell AFB	Montgomery	AL	West Virginia Wing	Middle East Region	
1999	Maxwell AFB	Montgomery	AL	Puerto Rico Wing	Southeast Region	
2000	Rescheduled					
2001	USAF Academy	Colorado Springs	CO	Virginia Wing	Middle East Region	
2002	USAF Academy	Colorado Springs	CO	Florida Wing	Southeast Region	C/CMSgt Marissa Streifel
2003	Wright State University	Dayton	OH	California Wing	Pacific Region	C/SMSgt Laura Borenstein
2004	Wright State University	Dayton	OH	Florida Wing	Southeast Region	C/MSgt Jessica Aubuchon
2005	Udvar-Hazy Center, Smithsonian Museum	Washington	DC	Florida Wing	Southeast Region	C/CMSgt Casey Culp
2006	Udvar-Hazy Center, Smithsonian Museum	Washington	DC	California Wing	Pacific Region	C/SrA Jesse Almanza
2007	National Museum of the Air Force	Dayton	OH	Arizona Wing	Southwest Region	C/SSgt Isaiah Huen
2008	Wright State University	Dayton	OH	Florida Wing	Southeast Region	C/CMSgt Tim Lhota
2009	Evergreen Aviation Museum	McMinnville	OR	New York Wing	Northeast Region	C/CMSgt Thomas Macrini
2010	Evergreen Aviation Museum	McMinnville	OR	Florida Wing	Southeast Region	C/CMSgt Tyler Gwynn
2011	Wright State University	Dayton	OH	California Wing	Pacific Region	C/CMSgt Nicholas Chun
2012	Wright State University	Dayton	OH	Puerto Rico Wing	Southeast Region	C/CMSgt Bryan Chavez
2013	Wright State University	Dayton	OH	Utah Wing	Rocky Mountain Region	C/CMSgt Rosalyn Carlisi

== Statistics of the National Cadet Competition (1974–2013) ==
The following table shows the number of national championships won since the recreation of the National Cadet Competition in 1974 until the discontinuation of NCC in 2013, by region.

National Championships won by region
Region	Drill Team Championships Won	Color Guard Championships Won	Total
Northeast Region	15	1	16
Southeast Region	6	7	13
Southwest Region	7	2	9
Middle East Region	4	2	6
Pacific Region	3	3	6
Great Lakes Region	3	1	4
Rocky Mountain Region	2	1	3
North Central Region	0	0	0

National Drill Team Championships won by wing
Titles won	Wing	Championship years
8	New York	2005, 2002, 1991, 1988, 1985, 1984, 1982, 1980
6	New Jersey	1997, 1994, 1993, 1992, 1990, 1989
3	Puerto Rico	2011, 2007, 2004
3	Louisiana	1999, 1998, 1995
3	California	1987, 1986, 1981
3	North Carolina	1979, 1978, 1974
2	Texas	2012, 1975
2	Utah	2010, 2009
2	Arizona	2008, 2006
2	Illinois	1996, 1983
2	Georgia	1977, 1976
1	Ohio	2013
1	Tennessee	2013
1	Delaware	2003
1	Massachusetts	2001

National Color Guard Championships won by wing
Titles won	Wing	Championship years
5	Florida	2010, 2008, 2005, 2004, 2002
3	California	2011, 2006, 2003
2	Puerto Rico	2012, 1999
1	Utah	2013
1	New York	2009
1	Arizona	2007
1	Virginia	2001
1	West Virginia	1998
1	Indiana	1997
1	Oklahoma	1996
