= Luis E. Negron =

American military commander

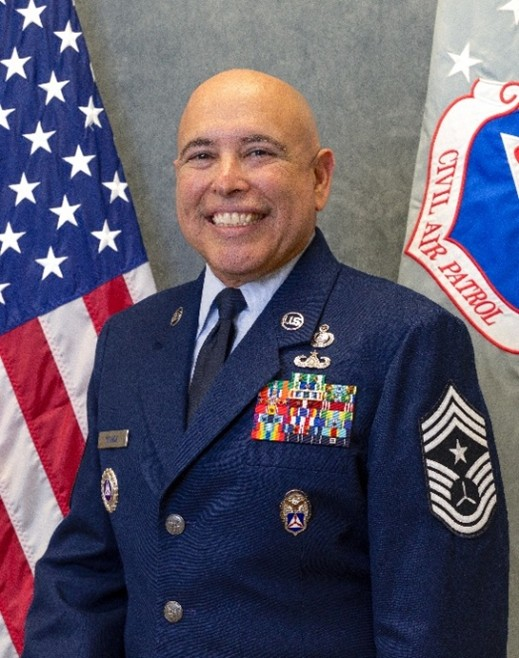
- Born: San Juan, Puerto Rico
- Military career
- Allegiance: United States of America
- Branch: United States Army; United States Coast Guard; Civil Air Patrol
- Service years: 1989—present
- Rank: National Command Chief
- Commands: National Command Chief of the Civil Air Patrol; CAP Southeast Region; Florida Wing
- Awards: Distinguished Service Medal (3); Exceptional Service Award (3); Meritorious Service Award (4)

Chief Master Sgt. Luis E. Negrón is the current Civil Air Patrol national command chief; chosen by CAP Maj. Gen. Regena M. Aye in August 2025, to act as her senior advisor.

Negrón first enrolled in the Puerto Nuevo Cadet Squadron in 1989, and earned the Billy Mitchell Award.

In 1990 Negrón joined the United States Army, serving for seven years and served 22 years in the United States Coast Guard, where he rose to the rank of Senior Chief Operations Specialist (OSC) at USCG Sector Miami. His decorations include three Coast Guard Commendation Medals, two Coast Guard Achievement Medals, Coast Guard Presidential Unit Citation with "hurricane symbol", both the Coast Guard and U.S. Army Good Conduct Medals, two Army Achievement Medals, National Defense Service Medal with one Service star and three Humanitarian Service Medals. He retired after 29 years of combined Army and Coast Guard service.

Since joining as an adult member in 1996, he held several positions, including squadron commander, group commander in both the Puerto Rico and Florida wings, homeland security and emergency services director, wing chief of staff, and deputy commander and commander of the CAP Florida Wing. In January 2025 he became CAP Southeast Region command chief.
