= Dayle Hinman =

FBI profiler (born 1952)

- Born: September 21, 1952 (age 73); Connecticut, U.S.
- Education: Florida State University
- Title: Criminal profiler

Dayle Hinman (born September 21, 1952) is a retired, FBI-trained criminal profiler. She starred in a television series on TruTV (earlier known as CourtTV).

== Education ==
Hinman holds a bachelor's degree from Florida State University in criminology. She had a one-year fellowship at the FBI Behavioral Sciences unit and was one of the first people there to be trained in forensic profiling under John E. Douglas.

== Career ==
=== Law enforcement ===
Hinman's law enforcement career began in 1975 and spanned 26 years, including stints at Florida State University, Leon County, Florida, and the FDLE. During her career, she was one of only a handful of female criminal profilers.

Hinman has worked on several high-profile cases, including those of Ted Bundy, O. J. Simpson, Rory Enrique Conde and Aileen Wuornos.

=== Television ===
Hinman starred in a television series on TruTV (earlier known as CourtTV). The program Body of Evidence: From the case files of Dayle Hinman documented some of the cases she worked while a special agent at the Florida Department of Law Enforcement, as well as some other cases. Body of Evidence (which should not be confused with the TV crime drama Body of Proof) was a documentary-style show with interviews, re-enactments and an off-camera narrator. Each episode included scenes of Hinman discussing the case in question, as well as scenes of her playing herself in re-enactments.
