= Grover Loening Award =

Civil Air Patrol award

Grover Loening Aerospace Award ribbon

The Grover Loening Award is given to Civil Air Patrol (CAP) Senior Members who complete Level III of the Senior Member Professional Development Program. It recognizes those members who have dedicated themselves to leadership and personal development in the CAP. This award was first given in 1964 and honors the late Grover Loening. A noted aviation pioneer, Loening was the first civilian member of the National Air and Space Museum’s advisory board.

Civil Air Patrol is the Auxiliary of the United States Air Force. CAP has a three-fold mission. It includes emergency services, cadet programs, and aerospace education. CAP professional development provides technical skills and leadership training to senior members age 18 and over to support CAP's mission. The program enables these adults to develop these skills while providing a vital public service to our nation.

Members progress through the program by completing five increasingly complex training levels. Each level requires the member to become more involved in CAP activities, master skills in one of 23 technical areas, and develop leadership ability. Members receive awards, chances for promotion, and selection for more important roles within CAP while completing these levels.

The third milestone is the Loening Award. Members must have received the CAP Certificate of Proficiency, and have served in staff or command assignments over at least one year. Members must also complete the Corporate Learning Course, and attend two wing, region, or national conferences.

Of CAP's 35,000 senior members, only about 350 earn the Grover Loening Award each year. Receipt of the award and completion of rank and time-in-grade requirements also makes the member eligible for promotion to CAP Captain.

Members may go on to the fourth level, the Paul E. Garber Award, and then the fifth and final level, the Gill Robb Wilson Award.
