= Gill Robb Wilson =

American journalist

- Born: September 18, 1892; Clarion County, Pennsylvania, U.S.
- Died: September 8, 1966 (aged 73); Covina, California, U.S.
- Known for: First director of Civil Air Patrol

Gill Robb Wilson (September 18, 1892 – September 8, 1966) was an American pilot, Presbyterian minister, and military advocate. Wilson was a founder of the Civil Air Patrol.

== Early life ==
Wilson was born in Clarion County, Pennsylvania to the Rev. Gill Irwin Wilson and Amanda E. Robb, on September 18, 1892.

== World War I ==
Gill Robb and his brother Volney traveled to France to join the Allied war effort. After initially driving ambulances he became a member of the Lafayette Flying Corps. His service for the French was with French Escadrille Br. 117. He is also reported to have served with the 163d Aero Squadron

== The ministry ==
A son of a Presbyterian minister, Gill Robb Wilson also became a preacher after World War I. He attended seminary in Pittsburgh and was ordained into a forerunner of the current Presbyterian Church. During his training for the ministry, Gill Robb acquired an accomplished skill with the spoken and written word. This training would serve him well in later years. He was installed as Pastor of the Fourth Presbyterian Church of Trenton, New Jersey. During this pastorate (in 1927), Gill Robb Wilson was named Chaplain of the American Legion. After the death of his first wife and second child, he suffered the loss of his voice. Doctors required silence if his voice was to recover. It was at this point that he left the church.

== Professional life ==
Gill Robb became Director of Aeronautics for the State of New Jersey in 1930 and served in this role until 1944. As such, he shared in oversight of the Lakehurst landing field and participated as a member of the Inquiry Board (appointed by the U.S. Secretary of Commerce) related to the crash of the zeppelin Hindenburg. He was the first director of the Civil Air Patrol. In 1939 he became the first member of the Aircraft Owners and Pilots Association. He also served as the editor of AOPA's first publication. He witnessed the test of the atomic bomb on Bikini Island.

== Writing career ==
Gill Robb Wilson was an early editor of Flying Magazine. In World War II, he was a correspondent for the Herald Tribune. Wilson was also the author of a book of poetry, which included some pieces on World War I aviation, and the autobiographical work, I Walked with Giants, Vantage Press, 1968.

== Personal life ==
Gill Robb Wilson was married to Margaret Perrine and had a daughter, Margaret Robb Wilson. His first wife, Margaret Perrine Wilson, succumbed to the influenza epidemic while she was pregnant with their second daughter. He married his second wife, Mary Josephine Clary, on April 28, 1931, in Parkersburg, West Virginia. Gill Robb Wilson died in Los Angeles County, California.

== Legacy ==
- Gill Robb Wilson Award
- Mid-Ohio Valley Regional Airport in Parkersburg, West Virginia is named Gill Robb Wilson Field.
