= Florida State Guard =

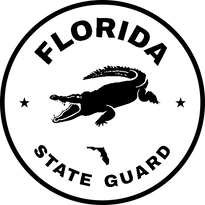
- Active: 1941–1947, 2022–present
- Country: United States
- Allegiance: Florida
- Type: State defense force
- Role: State Defense Force
- Size: 1500 authorized personnel
- Garrison/HQ: St Augustine, Florida
- Nickname: FSG
- Anniversaries: August 30th (since 2024)
- Website: https://www.floridastateguard.org/

Commanders
- Commander-in-Chief: Governor Ron DeSantis
- Executive Director: Mr Mark Thieme

The Florida State Guard (FSG) is the state defense force of the U.S. state of Florida. Service in the FSG does not make one a United States military veteran. The FSG was created in 1941 to serve as a stateside replacement for the Florida National Guard while the National Guard was deployed abroad during World War II. The FSG is available to the governor of Florida whenever needed, but unlike the National Guard, the FSG is trained and funded by the state and therefore cannot be federalized. The FSG was reactivated in 2022 after the Florida legislature appropriated US$10 million in funding.

== Background ==
State defense forces are authorized by the federal government under Title 32, Section 109 of the United States Code. Twenty-three states, as well as the territory of Puerto Rico, actively maintain these forces. Florida law also allows the creation of a state defense force, either as a full-sized force when any part of the National Guard is federally deployed, or as a reserve cadre of officers and non-commissioned officers regardless of National Guard deployment.

== Original incarnation ==
=== Creation ===
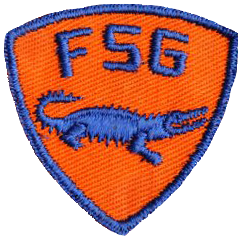
The shoulder patch worn by Guardsmen during World War II.

Before the United States entered World War II, President Franklin D. Roosevelt instituted a peacetime draft, and federalized various National Guard units, including Florida's National Guard. As a result, states which had previously counted on their National Guard to maintain peace, quell riots, protect against sabotage, or repel a potential invasion were given the alternative of creating their own state-level military forces under the State Guard Act signed by President Franklin D. Roosevelt on October 21, 1940. In 1941, the Florida Legislature and Governor Holland created the Florida Defense Force, later to be rebranded as the Florida State Guard in mid-1943.

The purpose of the state defense forces, including the FSG, was to fulfil the National Guard's state obligations. This included guarding infrastructure, protecting against sabotage, calming riots, or aiding law enforcement. Although the mainland United States was never invaded during World War II, state defenses would have shared responsibility with the federal military and National Guard in defending American territory had an invasion occurred.

During the war, the First Air Squadron of the FSG regularly patrolled the coast of Florida, searching for German U-boats. The squadron was also used to assist in search-and-rescue missions.

=== Membership ===
Membership during WWII was open to all Florida men aged 18 to 60. The commitment lasted for three years, although members who were eligible could be drafted into the federal military at any time. Most of the members were veterans of World War I. Members of the Florida Defense Force's air wing, the First Air Squadron, were required to either have a private pilot's license or have served in the military at least one year. By 1943, the Florida State Guard numbered 2,100 Florida men in 36 units.

=== Organization ===
Each county was able to organize its own unit so long as it could recruit at minimum fifty Florida men who met the qualifications required by the state. By 1943, there were 63 separate units of state guardsmen organized. The FSG also maintained a separate air squadron, known as the First Air Squadron.

=== Equipment ===
Uniforms, surplus weapons, and other equipment were provided by the state of Florida. Florida law also permitted the FSG to use National Guard armories and receive any surplus weapons and equipment offered by the Department of Defense. The approximately 27 airplanes used by the First Air Squadron were privately owned by the fifteen individuals who piloted them; however, they were allowed to have "1st Air Squadron, Florida Defense Force" painted on both sides of the nose of each plane.

=== Disbandment ===
The Florida State Guard was disbanded in 1947 after the Florida Army National Guard was released from Federal Active Duty.

== Modern Florida State Guard ==
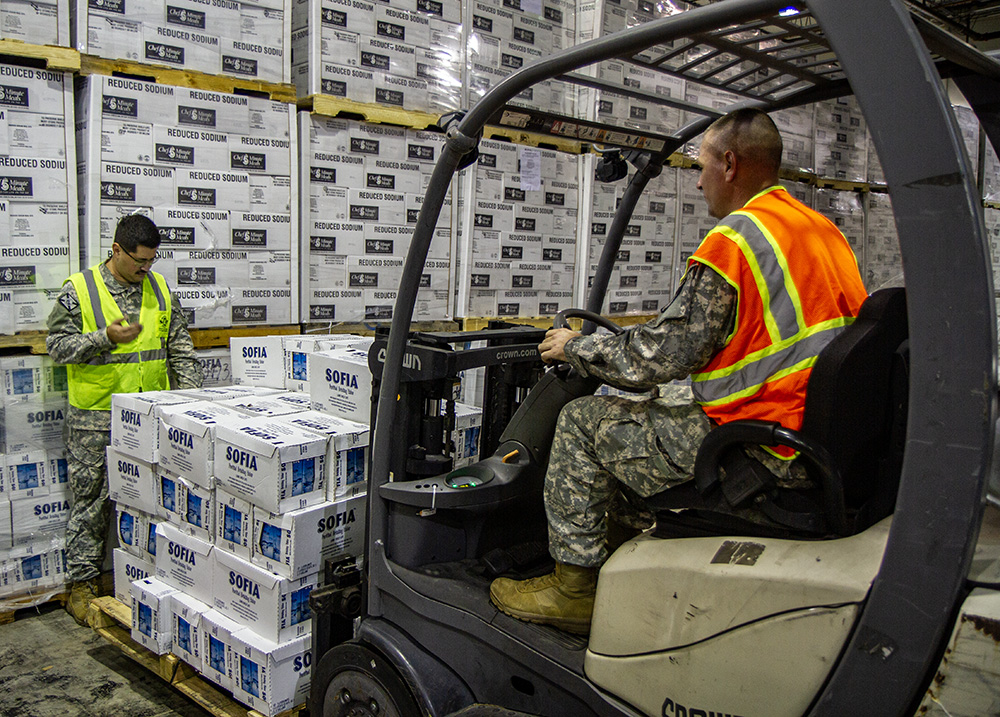
Florida State Guard members preparing for Hurricane Idalia in August 2023.

On December 2, 2021, Governor Ron DeSantis announced, in his $100 million budget for the Florida National Guard, that $3.5 million would be invested into reactivating the FSG. It would allow for training and equipment of up to 200 members. In March 2022, Florida lawmakers proposed a budget which included $10 million for reactivating the Florida State Guard. The funding would allow for an enlistment of 400 enlisted troops and six full-time civilian employees. The newly reactivated organization began soliciting applications from prospective employees in May 2022. On July 1, 2023, the Florida legislature increased the size of the FSG to 1500 members.

On June 14, 2022, Governor Ron DeSantis announced the reestablishment of the Florida State Guard as an emergency-focused civilian volunteer force and appointed retired Marine Corps. Lieutenant Colonel Chris Graham as director. On June 30, 2023, 120 New FSG Guardsmen were graduated from the Basic Operational Orientation Training Camp (BOOT Camp) at Camp Blanding, marking the Inaugural class of 2023 of the Florida State Guard, the first in 75 years.

In September 2023, the Florida State Guard was deployed in response to Hurricane Idalia and provided assistance by delivering aid at resource pods across North Florida — its first deployment since its deactivation following World War II.

On December 18, 2023, Flagler County approved the construction of a $10 million site designed for the training of the Florida State Guard and other governmental services known as "The Florida State Guard Regional Training Facility".

On February 1, 2024, Governor Ron DeSantis announced the deployment of the Florida State Guard to the southern border of Texas with Mexico to support Texan officials in handling illegal immigration. In late February Director Mark Thieme confirmed that 5 members of the Florida State Guard were deployed to Texas and that the deployment of up to a platoon of 30 members was being considered.

On March 13, 2024, it was announced by Florida's Governor that the Florida State Guard would take part in their State's response to the events in Haiti along with other government forces, being deployed to Florida's Southern Coast.

August 30, 2024 was marked as Florida State Guard Day, per Florida House Resolution 8027.

On the 19th of September it was reported that the Florida State Guard plans to create a permanent air-base at Tallahassee International Airport. The plan for the State Force consists the construction of two hangars, an office, and accompanying military infrastructure.

Throughout the 2024 hurricane season the FSG was activated three times, seeing service for Hurricanes Debby, Helene, and Milton. During Hurricane Helene some FSG personnel were sent to North Carolina. FSG personnel have been involved in Helene's recovery as late as 2026.

Winter Storm Enzo in January 2025 saw FSG personnel activated alongside FDOT and Florida Highway Patrol. They were involved in deicing and road clearance across the Florida panhandle, as well as working in coordination with FHP to close down I10 under Gov. Desantis' recognition that Floridians cannot drive.

The May 2025 Holmes County tornado was another FSG activation, where personnel from the Crisis Response Battalion cleared debris and reopened roads into the area.

In April 2026 members of the FSG partook in Florida's hurricane preparation exercises alongside the FLANG and FDEM, as well as the shakedown of Florida's new State Emergency Operations Center.

During the FIFA Games in 2026 FSG personnel augmented FDLE, FHP, and other agencies in providing security throughout south Florida.

=== Uniform ===
FSG Guardsmen wear the Army Combat Uniform in the Universal Camouflage Pattern (UCP) with Coyote Brown combat boots and UCP Patrol Cap, alongside a Tan 499 "Florida State Guard", "State Guard", or blank undershirt and corresponding rigger belt. The nametapes for the blouse and patrol cap are black stencil on UCP background. FSG Guardsmen will have their last name on the right nametape of their blouse and the back of their patrol cap (as worn) while the left nametape adorns the organization "FL STATE GUARD" in distinction from the U.S. ARMY nametape that is worn normally for Active Army, Army Reserve and Army National Guard Soldiers. Rank insignia will be worn on the blouse which is black stencil on UCP background as well as a pin-on or sew-on rank insignia on the front of the patrol cap as well. FSG Guardsmen will also wear a reversed subdued Florida State Flag patch on the right shoulder of the combat uniform as well as a designated unit patch below the flag, while the subdued FSG Shoulder Sleeve Insignia (SSI) is worn on the left shoulder.

FSG Guardsmen wear the Tan 499 "Florida State Guard" or "State Guard" undershirt as their physical training uniform alongside a black pair of shorts with a FSG logo on the right sleeve. FSG Guardsmen also wear commercial running shoes or sneakers for physical activity.

== Units ==
The Florida State Guard as of July 2024 is divided into ground, naval, air units along with special response.

- Crisis Response Battalion: Battalion sized ground unit focused on supporting, auxiliary and non-combat duties. Authorized to a strength of 750.
- Maritime Response Squadron: Naval unit with small craft focused on security, search and rescue, relief, and recon operations. Authorized to a strength of 200.
- Aviation Response Squadron: Aerial unit that conducts non-combat, auxiliary operations including intelligence, recon, fire, medical and disaster response. Authorized to a strength of 200.
- Special Missions Unit: A company sized specialist unit with security, response, recon, and search and rescue duties.

== Facilities ==
- Headquarters – Tallahassee
- Florida State Guard Facilities – Lakeland

== See also ==
- Florida Naval Militia
- Florida Wing Civil Air Patrol – Highest echelon of the Civil Air Patrol in Florida, USA
