= Florida Naval Militia =

- Active: 1897–1903; 1911–1917; 1934–1941
- Country: United States
- Allegiance: Florida
- Type: Naval militia
- Role: Military reserve force

The Florida Naval Militia was the official naval militia of the state of Florida. Naval militias were organized as naval parallels to the National Guard as dual federal and state obligations, with the naval militias normally being under state control but subject to federal activation. The Florida Naval Militia was active during three periods in Florida history: between 1897 and 1903; between 1911 and 1917; and between 1934 and 1941.

== History ==
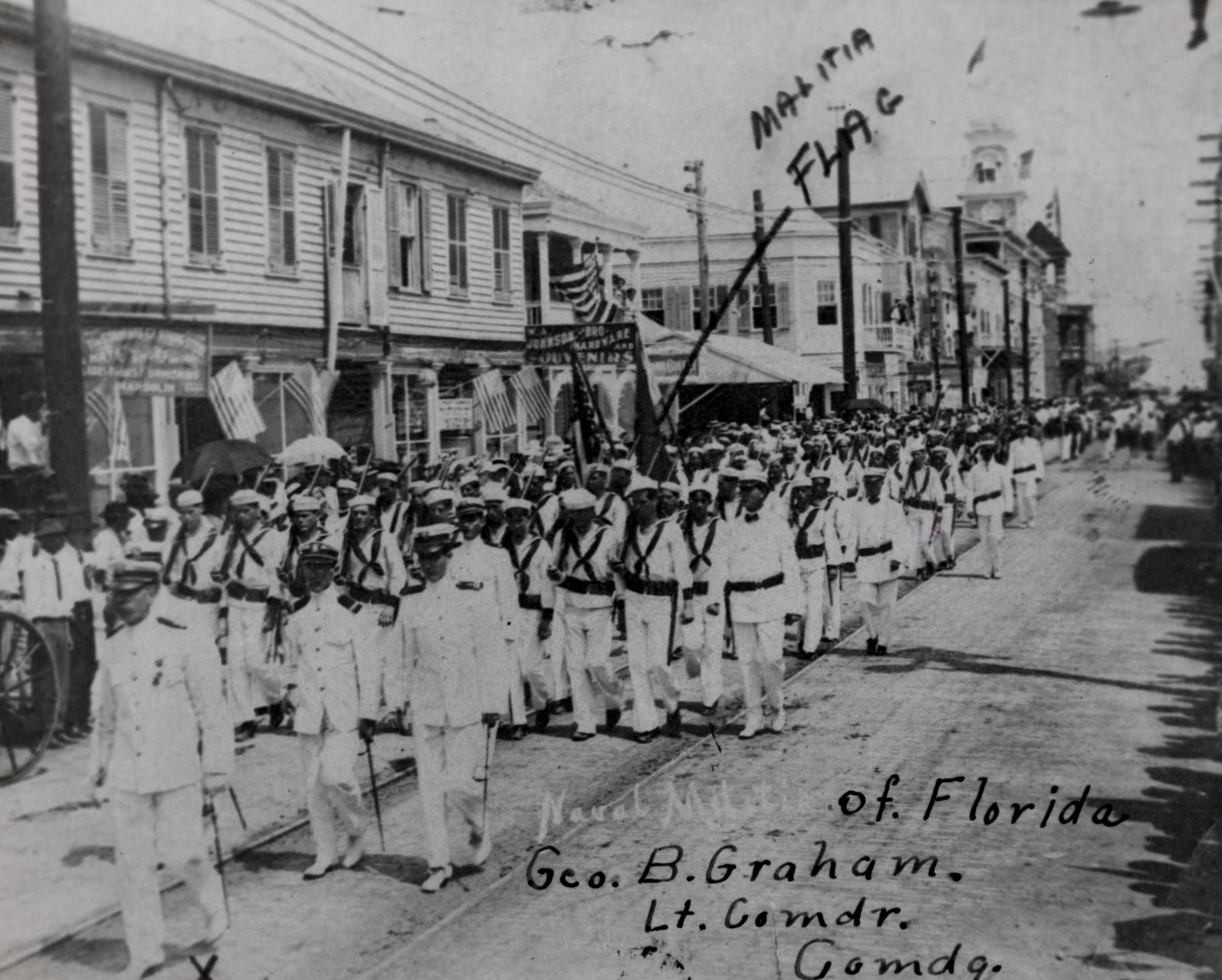
Floridian naval militiamen in 1912

=== History of predecessor units ===
==== Florida Naval and Marine Militia (C.S.) ====
The Florida Naval and Marine Militia served as a predecessor to the Florida Naval Militia. The Florida Naval and Marine Militia was a Confederate naval force which served between the years of 1861 and 1865.

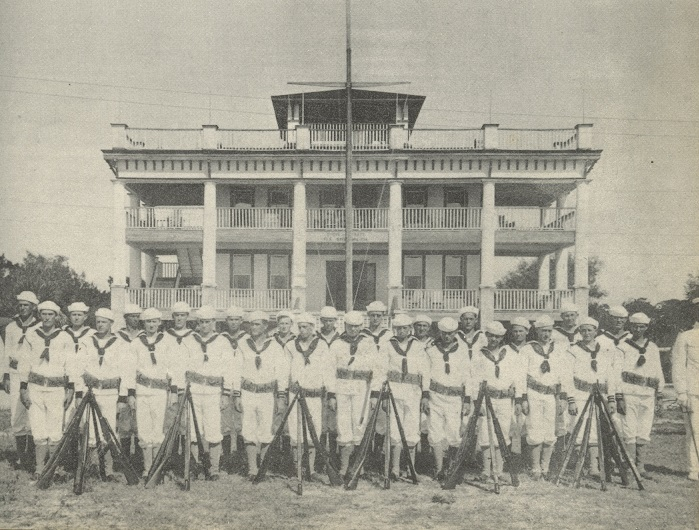
Naval militiamen in Sarasota, Florida, wearing their white uniforms in 1917.

=== Spanish–American War – World War II ===
==== 1897–1903 ====
The Florida Naval Militia was first created in 1897, and consisted of one battalion of four divisions, located at Jacksonville, Pensacola, Port Tampa, and Tampa. From 15 December 1898 until 21 June 1899, the USS Wasp was loaned to the Florida Naval Militia by the U.S. Navy. During the Spanish–American War, the members of the Florida Naval Militia were drafted into the federal Navy and Coast Guard, with only the Jacksonville Division being reorganized after the war until its disbandment in 1903.

==== 1911–1917 ====
The Florida Naval Militia was reinstated in 1911 with three divisions located in Key West, Jacksonville, and Sarasota. After the onset of World War I, the entire naval militia was activated for the duration of the war, and not reconstituted under state service after the war ended. Before being federalized, members drilled once per week (later increased to twice per week), underwent physical examinations and measurements for uniforms, and were vaccinated for typhoid and smallpox.

==== 1934–1941 ====
Due largely to the efforts of Governor David Sholtz, the Governor of Florida and an officer in the Naval Reserve, the Florida Naval Militia was reorganized in 1934. However, with the entrance of the United States into World War II, the members of the naval militia were once again called into federal service, and the organization was dissolved in 1941.

== Legal status ==
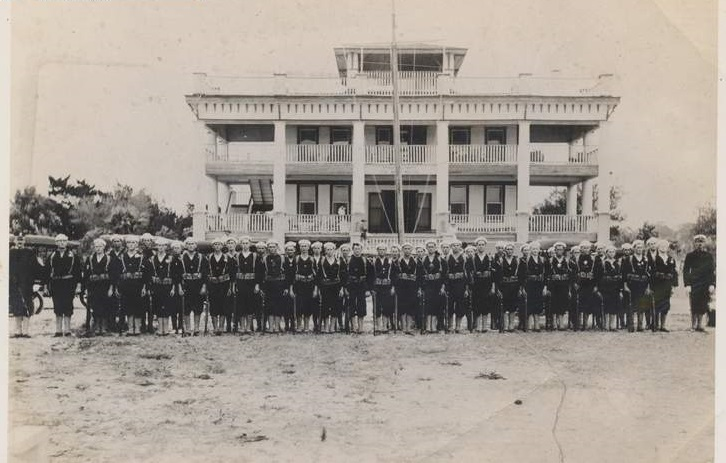
Floridian naval militiamen in Sarasota, Florida, wearing their black uniforms in 1917.

Although currently not organized, federal and state laws still allow each state to maintain its own military forces, including a naval militia. United States Code specifically defines the Naval Militia as one of the components of the United States organized militia, along with the National Guard. So long as at least 95% of a state's naval militia's membership is composed of Navy Reserve and Marine Corps Reserve members, naval militias may be loaned or issued vessels, material, armament, equipment, and other facilities of the Navy and the Marine Corps that are available to the Navy Reserve and Marine Corps Reserve.

States creating a naval militia may therefore either create a naval militia completely out of civilian volunteers under Title 32; a naval militia composed of Navy and Marine Corps Reserve members and eligible for federal equipment under Title 10; or a hybrid naval, composed of some units of civilian volunteers and ineligible for federal aid, and some units of federal reservists, whose units are eligible for federal aid, which allows the organization as a whole to receive federal equipment and aid while opening membership to civilians as well. The New Jersey Naval Militia offers an example of a hybrid-approach to the naval militia; the New Jersey Naval Militia was composed of three battalions. The first battalion was composed solely of navy and marine reservists in order to receive access to federal support and Navy and Marine Corps facilities. The second battalion was organized as an operational Naval State Guard, and the 3rd Division provided support and auxiliary functions. By only seeking federal recognition for the first battalion as a naval militia, and considering the other two as divisions of the New Jersey State Guard, the NJNM was able to receive federal aid and include significant numbers of civilian volunteers into the state naval force. Such an organizational method is legal so long as only the units with federal recognition are given access to federal equipment.

Floridian state law grants the governor the authority to create and maintain a naval militia as well; maintaining a naval militia organized under federal guidelines is authorized under Title XVII of chapter Chapter 250 in the Floridian state law. Florida law also allows the creation of a state defense force, which could include or wholly consist of a naval unit not held to federal standards. As such, the governor of Florida has the ability to reactivate the Florida Naval Militia based on existing legal permission at any time.

== See also ==
- Florida National Guard
- Florida State Guard
- Florida Wing Civil Air Patrol
- State defense force
- United States Coast Guard Auxiliary
- United States Naval Sea Cadet Corps
- United States Power Squadrons
