= Florida Department of Law Enforcement =

Florida government agency

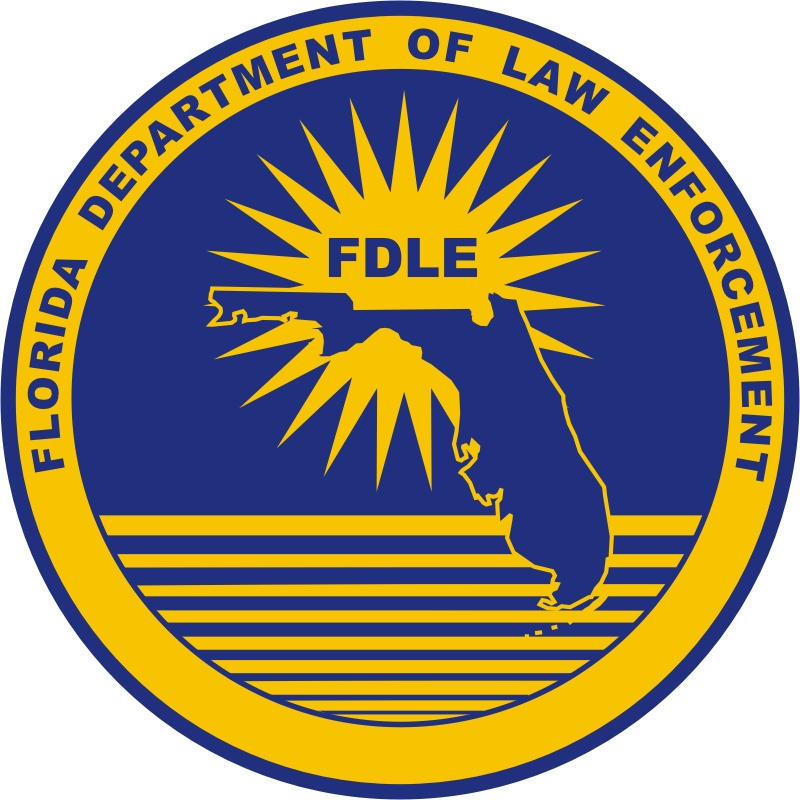

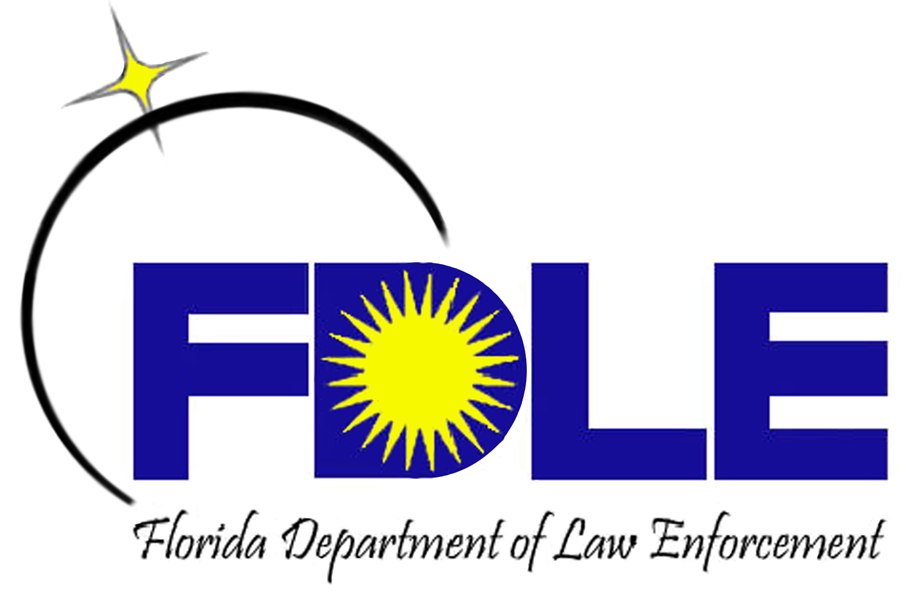

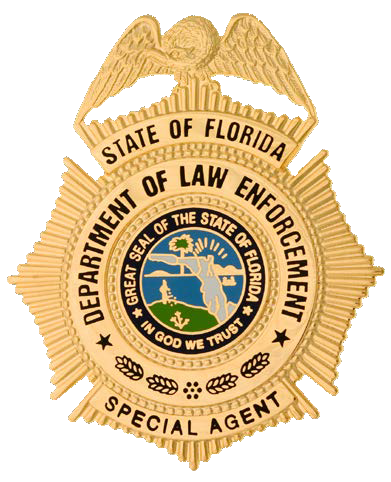
- Abbreviation: FDLE

Agency overview
- Employees: 2000
- Annual budget: $300 million

Jurisdictional structure
- Operations jurisdiction: Florida, U.S.
- General nature: Local civilian police

Operational structure
- Headquarters: Tallahassee, Florida
- Agency executives: Mark Glass, Commissioner; Ron DeSantis, Governor of Florida; James Uthmeier, Attorney General of Florida

Facilities
- Regional Operation Centers: 7 (Fort Myers, Jacksonville, Miami, Orlando, Pensacola, Tallahassee, Tampa)

Website
- www.fdle.state.fl.us

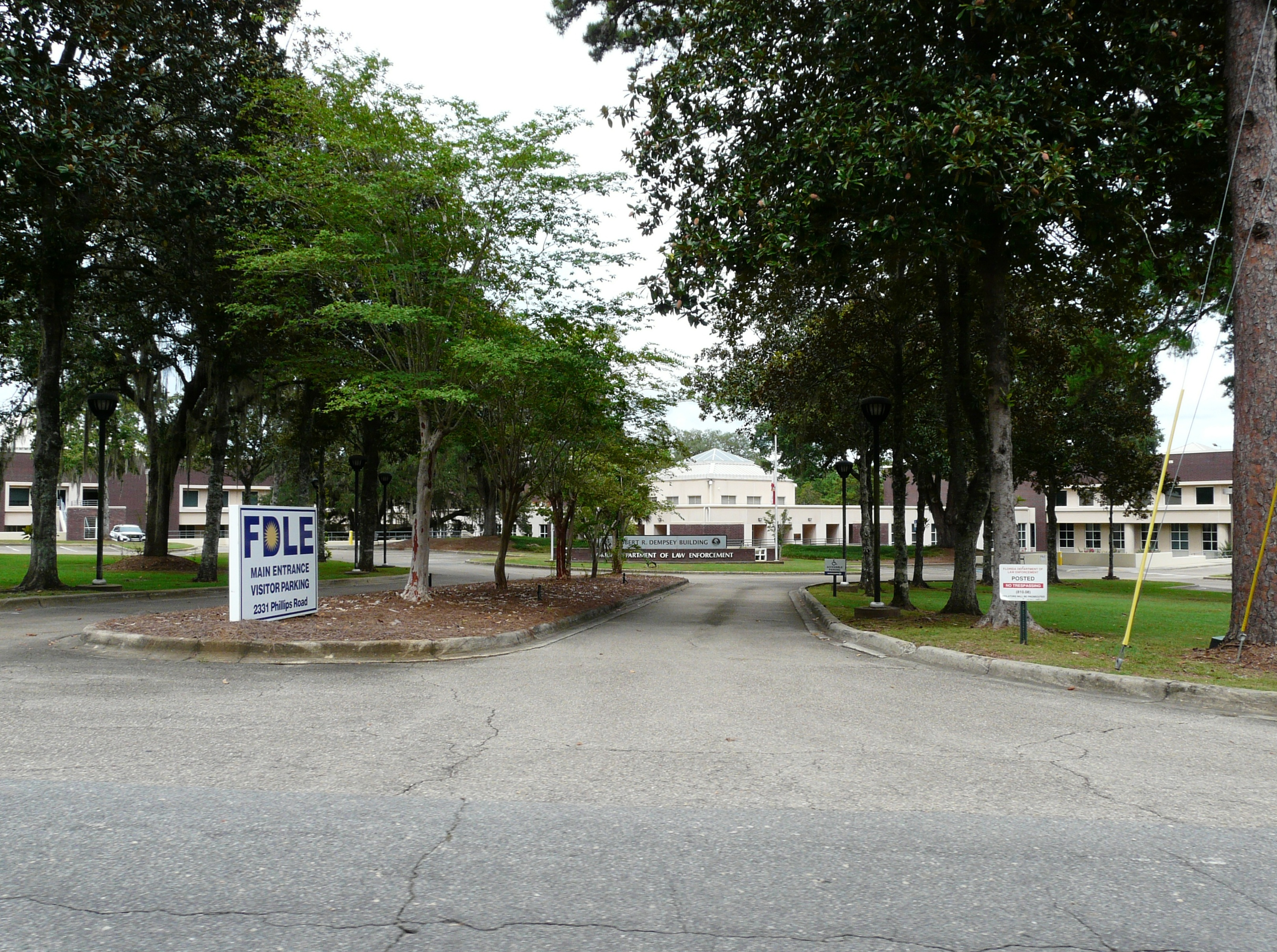
Headquarters in the Robert R. Dempsey Building in Tallahassee

The Florida Department of Law Enforcement (FDLE) is a state-wide investigative law enforcement agency within the state of Florida. The department formally coordinates eight boards, councils, and commissions. FDLE's duties, responsibilities, and procedures are mandated through Chapter 943, Florida Statutes, and Chapter 11, Florida Administrative Code. FDLE is headed by a commissioner (executive director) who reports to the Florida Cabinet, which is composed of the governor, the attorney general, the chief financial officer, and the commissioner of agriculture. The commissioner is appointed to his position by the governor and cabinet and confirmed by the Florida Senate.

The department is headquartered in Tallahassee, the state capital, and has close to 2,000 employees statewide. The department maintains seven regional operations centers, 12 field offices, and seven crime laboratories.

== Overview ==
FDLE's five "program areas" are:

- Executive Direction and Business Support Program,
- Criminal Investigations and Forensic Science Program,
- Florida Capitol Police Program,
- Criminal Justice Information Program, and
- Criminal Justice Professionalism Program.

The FDLE has earned accreditation from the Commission on Accreditation for Law Enforcement Agencies, the American Society of Crime Laboratory Directors / Laboratory Accreditation Board, and the Commission for Florida Law Enforcement Accreditation. FDLE Special Agents handle a wide variety of crimes and assist local police and sheriff's offices with limited resources, to include, homicide, public official misconduct, police misconduct, as well as major drug trafficking crimes. They also provide security for the governor of Florida and his or her family. FDLE is the State of Florida's investigative arm. They are considered more of a state police than Florida's highway patrol, which specializes in traffic enforcement and vehicle-related homicide. All investigation into any crimes, including crimes committed by law enforcement can only be initiated by a government agency and all citizen requests will be denied.

== History ==
In 1967, the Florida Legislature merged the duties and responsibilities of several state criminal justice organizations to create the Bureau of Law Enforcement. Bringing together the resources of the Florida Sheriffs Bureau, the State Narcotics Bureau, and the law enforcement activities of the Anti-Bookie Squad of the Florida Attorney General's Office, the original Bureau of Law Enforcement had 94 positions and a $1.5 million budget for its first year of operation. The bureau was headed by a commissioner who reported to a board composed of the Governor of Florida, specified members of the Cabinet, two sheriffs, and one chief of police. The agency had five divisions: Administration, Intelligence and Investigation, Technical Services, Administrative Intelligence, and Planning and Research.

As a result of Florida governmental restructuring in July 1969, the bureau became the Florida Department of Law Enforcement, or FDLE. As a department of the executive branch of government, FDLE was headed by the governor and cabinet. The FDLE commissioner was appointed by the governor with the approval of three members of the cabinet and subject to confirmation by the Florida Senate. At the time, the department consisted of four divisions – Operations, Administrative Intelligence, Criminal Identification and Information, and Training and Inspection.

The agency permanently decentralized many services offered previously only through Headquarters, and rolling them out to the newly defined Regional Operations Centers (ROC). They assumed responsibility for human resource and business functions and began to offer information systems support, training, and increased analytical assistance directly to the surrounding region. The restructuring placed authority at the regional level, with members of the ROCs reporting to a regional director (special agent in charge) instead of the Tallahassee headquarters. The traditional investigative role of the ROCs expanded significantly, allowing them to offer more specialized assistance.

In July 1990, FDLE was the first state law enforcement agency in the nation to be accredited by the CALEA. The agency successfully attained CALEA reaccreditation status in 1995, 2000, 2003, and 2006. In October 1996, FDLE was the first statewide law enforcement agency to be accredited by the CFA. The agency was jointly reaccredited in 2000, 2003, and 2006 by both the CALEA and CFA. FDLE also received initial accreditation by ASCLD/LAB in 1990, and has achieved reaccreditation during each subsequent five-year reaccreditation period.

In the late 1990s, FDLE's Executive Policy Board was formally organized. Composed of program directors, regional special agents in charge, and other headquarters leadership, the EPB provides a frequent forum for the review of department-wide issues and policy-level decision making.

In 2000, the legislature transferred the Division of Public Assistance Fraud from the auditor general to FDLE. The following year, the Department of Community Affairs' Office of Criminal Justice Grants was legislatively transferred to FDLE. Following the events of September 11, 2001, FDLE assumed responsibility as the state's domestic security coordinator and partnering with Florida Sheriffs to lead the state's seven Regional Domestic Security Task Forces. The Florida Capitol Police, with its responsibility for providing law enforcement and security services to the state Capitol, was legislatively transferred to FDLE in 2002.

== Organization ==
Headquartered in Tallahassee, the FDLE employs nearly 2,000 members statewide who work at headquarters, the department's seven regional operations centers, 15 field offices, and seven crime laboratories.

=== Headquarters ===
Office of Executive Director

- Executive investigations
- General counsel
- Inspector general
- Legislative affairs
- External affairs

Public Safety Services

- Criminal Justice Information Services (CJIS)
- Business Support Program
- Professionalism Program
- Information Technology Services
- Florida Capitol Police

Investigations & Forensic Science

- Domestic Security and Investigations
- Forensic Services

=== Regional Operations Centers and field offices ===
- Ft. Myers Operations Center with Sarasota and Sebring
- Jacksonville Operations Center with Gainesville and St. Augustine
- Miami Operations Center with Key West and West Palm Beach
- Orlando Operations Center with Ft. Pierce, and Melbourne
- Pensacola Operations Center with Panama City.
- Tallahassee Operations Center with Live Oak
- Tampa Bay Operations Center with Brooksville and Lakeland

=== Regional Crime Laboratories ===
- Ft. Myers
- Jacksonville
- Orlando
- Pensacola
- Tallahassee
- Tampa

== Florida Capitol Police ==
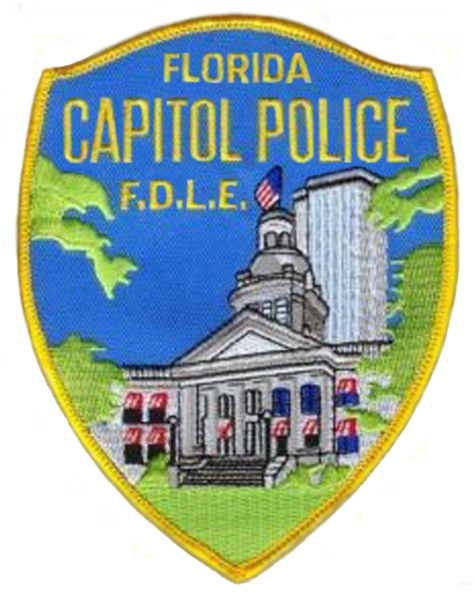

The Florida Capitol Police, part of the FDLE, is a uniformed police department in Tallahassee, in charge of security and law enforcement on the grounds of the Florida State Capitol and various other state government buildings.

=== History ===
The Capitol Police was created by the Florida Legislature and began service in 1973 as a plainclothes security force created. Originally known as Legislative Security, it operated under the Florida Department of General Services (DGS).

The first director was Florida Highway Patrol Captain Nathan Sharron, and the original administrative offices were in the Larson Building, with security operations office in a few small offices in the Senate Office Building. In 1973, Legislative Security employed 20 members, including security officers and a handful of plainclothes law enforcement officers, known as special agents. It had the only explosive ordnance disposal unit in the Big Bend area. In 1978, two years after the new Capitol building was completed, Legislative Security moved its operations and administrative offices into the new building.

In 1983, legislation changed the name from Legislative Security to the Division of Safety and Crime Prevention. The director at that time was James McPherson, formerly of the State Beverage Agency. The uniformed police became more highly visible and members were assigned to various state buildings besides the Capitol. Responsibilities increased and included the Capitol Complex as a whole, state buildings, and state facilities in Miami, Orlando, Tampa, and 11 other cities known as Regional Service Centers.

In 1985, the Florida Legislature mandated that the Division of Safety and Crime Prevention provide training and safety courses to other state agencies at their request. They were also mandated to develop and conduct evacuation procedures for the Capitol.

During the early 1990s, the department became the Capitol Police. McPherson retired in 1995, and was succeeded by Colonel Timothy Kerns as director. Kerns retired in 1998, and was succeeded by Terry Meek, a former FDLE special agent.

After the September 11 attacks, Governor Jeb Bush placed the Capitol Police under the direction of the Florida Department of Law Enforcement (FDLE). The new director was Scotty Sanderson, former FDLE Director of Mutual Aid. Security at the Capitol was elevated, magnetometers and x-ray machines were used to screen all visitors, and additional state law enforcement officers were assigned to the Capitol.

In 2002, the Florida Capitol Police were officially transferred to the FDLE under House Bill 1407, with sworn law enforcement officers across the state relocated to Tallahassee. Today the primary responsibility of Capitol Police is to protect the security of the governor, the Lieutenant Governor, the members of the Florida Cabinet, the members of the Florida Senate and the Florida House of Representatives, and all employees assigned to assist such state officials in the performance of their official duties and provide security and protection for other state officials, employees, and visitors to the Capitol Complex.

=== Units ===
Units of the Florida Capitol Police include:

- Operations
  - Patrol: Units patrolling the Capitol Building, Holland Building, Pepper Building, and the Capital Circle Office Center.
  - Communications Section: Responsible for answering and initiating all calls for police and security services at the Capitol and other facilities within the Capitol Complex, with seven full-time staff members and one supervisor.
  - Directed Patrol Team: A six-member team which operates primarily on bicycles.
- Special Operations
  - Investigations: Consisting of one lieutenant, two sworn investigators, and one government analyst, responsible for all investigations that occur at the Capitol Complex.
  - Hazardous Devices: Created in 1974, it was the first squad in the North Florida area to become a fully equipped unit, the first to deploy a bomb robot, and the first to be accredited by the Federal Bureau of Investigation Bomb Data Center.
  - K-9: The K-9 unit has four explosive detection canine teams.
- Special assignments
  - Special Operations Team (SOT): A ten-member team. Established in 2003 with five members as the Critical Incident Team (CIT) to bridge the gap between the occurrence of a critical incident and arrival of the Leon County Sheriff's Office SWAT Team.
  - Protective Operation Section: Eight officers providing protective services to members of either of the houses of the legislature.
  - Honor Guard: Consisting of four officers and a sergeant.

== Florida Criminal Justice Standards & Training Commission ==
The Florida Criminal Justice Standards & Training Commission (CJSTC), established in 1967 under Florida Statutes, Chapter 943, is a Florida state commission. The commission's mission is "To ensure that all citizens of Florida are served by criminal justice officers who are ethical, qualified, and well-trained." It is part of the Florida Department of Law Enforcement.

It has a number of primary responsibilities. One of them, among other things, is to establish minimum standards for the employment and training of law enforcement and correctional officers. A second responsibility is to certify officers. A third responsibility is to review and administer administrative sanctions where there is a violation of Florida Statutes and Commission standards. A fourth responsibility it to maintain records of all certified officers.

== Notable FDLE members ==
- Dayle Hinman
- Antonio J. Pineda

=== Fictional members ===
- Jim Longworth
- Lex Rogers

== See also ==
- State Bureau of Investigation
- List of law enforcement agencies in Florida
- List of U.S. state and local law enforcement agencies
