= Paul E. Garber Award =

Paul E. Garber Award ribbon

The Paul E. Garber Award is given to Civil Air Patrol (CAP) Senior Members who complete Level IV of the Senior Member Professional Development Program. It recognizes those members who have dedicated themselves to leadership and personal development in the CAP. This award was first given in 1964 and honors Paul E. Garber. Mr. Garber was a noted aviation pioneer, curator emeritus of the National Air and Space Museum, and early champion of Civil Air Patrol.

Civil Air Patrol is the Auxiliary of the United States Air Force. CAP has a three-fold mission. It includes emergency services, cadet programs, and aerospace education. CAP professional development provides technical skills and leadership training to senior members age 18 and over to support CAP’s mission. The program enables these adults to develop these skills while providing a vital public service to the US nation.

As the member progresses through the program, he or she completes five increasingly complex training levels. Each level requires the member to become more involved in CAP activities, master skills in one of 23 technical areas, and develop leadership ability. As he or she completes these levels, the member receives awards, chances for promotion, and selection for more important roles within CAP.

The fourth milestone is the Garber Award. It is earned after receiving the Grover Loening Award. In addition, members must inform their communities about CAP. They must train fellow members in a variety of courses. They must serve in command or leadership positions for at least two years. Finally, they must complete CAP’s mid-level leadership course, Region Staff College, or approved equivalent.

Of CAP’s 35,000 senior members, less than 200 earn the Paul E. Garber Award annually. Receipt of the award and completion of rank and time-in-grade requirements also makes the member eligible for promotion to CAP Major.

After receiving the Garber Award, participants may go on to the Gill Robb Wilson Award.

== See also ==
- List of aviation awards
