= Florida Wing Civil Air Patrol =

Highest echelon of the Civil Air Patrol in Florida, USA

- Florida Wing of Civil Air Patrol

Associated branches
- United States Air Force

Command staff
- Commander: Col David Panzera
- Deputy Commander: Lt Col James Minsterl - North; Lt Col Julio Pastoriza - South
- Chief of Staff: Lt Col Lazaro Garcia

Current statistics
- Cadets: 1,968
- Seniors: 1,817
- Total Membership: 3,785
- Awards: Unit Citation, National Commander Unit Citation
- Website: flwg.cap.gov
- Statistics as of 17 January 2025

Florida Wing Civil Air Patrol (CAP) is part of Southeast Region (SER) and the highest echelon of Civil Air Patrol in the state of Florida. Florida Wing headquarters is on the Sun 'n Fun campus located at Lakeland Linder International Airport in Lakeland, Florida. Florida Wing consists of over 3,500 cadet and adult members at over 66 locations across the state of Florida. Col David Panzera assumed command from Col Luis Negron on April 6, 2024, at the Florida Wing Conference in Orlando, Florida.

Celebrating its 80th anniversary in 2021, Civil Air Patrol is congressionally chartered and operates as a 501(c)(3) nonprofit corporation. CAP performs services for the federal government as the official civilian auxiliary of the U.S. Air Force and for states and local communities. CAP is a strategic member of the Total Force, consisting of the Air Force, Air National Guard, Air Force Reserve and CAP, when tasked, as the Air Force Auxiliary. CAP performs three primary missions — Cadet Programs, Aerospace Education, and Emergency Services.

== History ==
Prior to the creation of Civil Air Patrol, the state of Florida created its own group of paramilitary civilian aviators to patrol its coastline. Organized in 1941, the First Air Squadron was mustered in on May 28, 1941. Organized under the Florida Defense Force, the First Air Squadron was made up of civilian volunteers, and all aircraft were privately owned. Members were required to either have a private pilot's license or have served in the military at least one year to join. The First Air Squadron patrolled the Florida coast for U-boats and assisted in search and rescue missions.

Civil Air Patrol was created on December 1, 1941. In Florida, the First Air Squadron was reorganized as a Civil Air Patrol unit. By early January 1942, Florida wing was organized into seven different operation groups, each with a commander and staff.

Following the creation of the USAF, Public Law 80-557 in May 1948 officially designated CAP as the Air Force's civilian auxiliary. This law empowered the Secretary of the Air Force to assign military and civilian personnel to liaison offices at all levels of CAP, including the National, Regional, and Wing levels. These offices were established to assist CAP in fulfilling its missions, providing a direct "military counterpart" to CAP leadership to facilitate training, supply, and operational coordination. Wing liaison officers were typically active duty aeronautically rated USAF lieutenant colonels assisted by an active duty master sergeant or senior master sergeant from an administrative career field, both in a terminal pre-retirement assignment. Air Force Reserve and/or Air National Guard officers would also occasionally assist these liaison offices on an ad hoc part-time basis.

CAP-USAF Liaison Offices were typically located on active air force bases or, in the case of those states without an active USAF installation, on Air Force Reserve or Air National Guard bases at civilian airports. In Florida, the USAF-CAP LO was established at Orlando AFB, which became Naval Training Center Orlando following that installation's transfer from USAF to the U.S. Navy in 1969. The Florida Wing headquarters and the USAF-CAP LO then transferred to nearby McCoy AFB in 1971. When McCoy AFB was closed in 1975, the non-airfield portion of the base was transferred to the Navy as the NTC Orlando McCoy Annex and both the CAP Florida Wing headquarters and the USAF-CAP LO remained as tenants.

The broad elimination of full-time, active-duty USAF liaison offices at individual CAP wings (state-level headquarters) largely occurred in the late 1990s and early 2000s. Major military budget cuts in the post-Cold War era forced the USAF to prioritize resources, leading to the reduction of personnel assigned to CAP oversight. Aeronautically rated USAF officers in particular, even those considered to be in terminal assignments prior to retirement, became fewer in number and were prioritized for purely USAF or joint military assignments external to CAP support. By 1995, CAP transitioned to a fully corporate staff to handle day-to-day operations. This move allowed the USAF to pull back from direct administration to a role focused on advice, liaison, and oversight. In 2016, USAF oversight of CAP was eventually moved from the Air University and Air Education and Training Command (AETC) to Air Combat Command (ACC), specifically First Air Force-AFNORTH (1AF-AFNORTH), focused on integrating CAP into the USAF "Total Force" construct, emphasizing operational results over administrative liaison presence at the CAP wing level.

With NTC Orlando, to include the McCoy Annex, identified by the 1993 BRAC Commission for closure no later than 30 September 1999, Florida Wing headquarters relocated to MacDill AFB in Tampa on or about 1995. In 2001, in the wake of the 9/11 attacks on the U.S. homeland and the imposition of stricter security requirements at MacDill AFB due to that base also hosting Headquarters USCENTCOM and Headquarters USSOCOM, Florida Wing headquarters relocated to Coast Guard Air Station Miami. In 2012, CAP's Florida Wing headquarters relocated again to the Sun 'n Fun aeronautical campus at then-Lakeland Linder Regional Airport, now Lakeland Linder International Airport.

== Vision ==
Civil Air Patrol, the auxiliary of America's Air Force, building the nation's finest force of innovative citizen volunteers serving Community, State and Nation.

== Mission statement ==
Volunteers serving our nation, state and communities by saving lives, and shaping futures and raising standards.

== Command objectives ==
- Strengthen our organization through positive and professional interaction.
- Maximize Florida Wing, Civil Air Patrol support to our local, state, federal, and tribal partners, communities, and members.
- Sustain a capable, responsive, and accountable organization.

== Mission ==
Civil Air Patrol has three primary missions: aerospace education, cadet programs, and emergency services.

=== Emergency services ===
National:

- Conducts 90% of inland search and rescue in the U.S. as tasked by the Air Force Rescue Coordination Center (AFRCC) at Tyndall AFB, Florida and other agencies.
- Coordinates Air Force-assigned missions through the CAP National Operations Center at Maxwell AFB, Alabama, at a cost of $120-$165 per flying hour.
- Has nearly 7,000 aircrew members and over 33,000 emergency responders trained to Federal Emergency Management Agency (FEMA) standards.
- Provides over 450 chaplains and 600 character development instructors who minister to youth and adult members and help comfort victims of disasters.
- Performs highly specialized aerial imagery for disaster damage assessment and more to support local, state and national agencies.
- Provides air intercept training, impact assessment, light transport, communications support and low-level route surveys for the Air Force.
- Transports time-sensitive medical materials, blood products and body tissues when commercial resources are unavailable.
- Maintains an extensive national network of VHF and HF communications.

Florida:

- The wing provided aircraft, aircrews and small Unmanned Aerial Systems teams in response to the Puerto Rico earthquakes.
- Pilots provided 636 CAP cadet orientation flights, 13 collegiate/university ROTC cadet and midshipman orientation flights, 52 Junior ROTC cadet orientation flights and 14 teacher orientation flights.
- Aircrews flew 30 air defense target of interest flights for Fertile Keynote, 86 sorties for Exercise America's Shield and 42 low-level route survey sorties for Air Force Special Operations Command (AFSOC) and the 1st Special Operations Wing (1 SOW) at Hurlburt Field, Florida.
- The wing flew 11 sorties in support of the FEMA for the responses to Hurricanes Isaac and Sally.
- Members participated in Falcon Virgo, AEROnet, Eglin AFB installation / training & test range fire patrol, United States Army Space and Missile Defense Command radar training, Charlotte County harbor patrol, Felix Keynote, Fertile Hawk and Super Bowl air intercept training.

=== Cadet programs ===
Through their experiences as CAP cadets, young people develop into responsible citizens and become tomorrow's aerospace leaders. CAP is the volunteer, nonprofit auxiliary of the U.S. Air Force. Its three missions are to develop its cadets, educate Americans on the importance of aviation and space, and perform life-saving, humanitarian missions.

- Attracts over 24,000 members ages 12 through 20 for participation in its cadet programs.
- Educates youth in four main program areas — leadership, aerospace, fitness and character development.
- Enriches school curricula through afterschool programs.
- Meets the high school graduation requirement in Florida for 100 community service/volunteer hours.
- Offers orientation flights in powered and glider aircraft, as well as flight training scholarships.
- Provides activities and competitions for cadets at the local, state, regional and national levels.
- Provides opportunities for community involvement through color guard/drill team and emergency service missions.
- Challenges youth to be ambassadors for a drug-free lifestyle.
- Introduces thousands of cadets to cyber defense careers through CyberPatriot, the Air Force Association's National Youth Cyber Security Competition.
- CAP cadets make up about 10% of the Air Force Academy's classes.
- Cadets who have earned the Gen. Billy Mitchell Award enlist in the U.S. Air Force, U.S. Space Force, U.S. Army and U.S. Coast Guard at a higher pay grade
- Cadets who have earned the Gen. Billy Mitchell Award who enter the collegiate / university Air Force ROTC (AFROTC) program can exempt their first year of the 4-year AFROTC program and potentially graduate and commission as Air Force and Space Force officers in less than 3 years via CLEP, Advanced Placement, and/or compressed academic loads.
- Participates in the International Air Cadet Exchange (IACE) program.
- Awards college scholarships in several disciplines.

Florida Wing, 2020 Cadet Programs Statistics (note - lower numbers than usual due to COVID19 organizational wide stand-down):

- More than 370 cadets attended a wing-wide encampment.
- Four cadets achieved the Gen. Carl A. Spaatz Award, Civil Air Patrol's top cadet honor.
- The St. Augustine Composite Squadron cadet team placed second nationally in the All Service Division during the Air Force Association's first virtual national CyberPatriot cyber security competition and third in the CISCO NetAcad Challenge.
- Two cadets earned their private pilot certificate through CAP's Cadet Wings program.
- Four cadets received CAP flight scholarships and one was awarded a CAP academic scholarship.
- The Cadet Leadership Academy drew 193 cadets.
- Florida Wing 2021 Quality Cadet Unit Award Recipients: NORTH PERRY COMPOSITE SQUADRON SRQ COMPOSITE SQDN, Sarasota CHARLOTTE COUNTY COMPOSITE SQDN SEMINOLE COMPOSITE SQUADRON SAINT AUGUSTINE COMPOSITE SQUADRON POLK COUNTY COMPOSITE SQUADRON PATRICK COMPOSITE SQDN TAMIAMI COMPOSITE SQDN JACKSONVILLE COMPOSITE SQDN PENSACOLA CADET SQDN TALLAHASSEE COMPOSITE SQDN WESLEY CHAPEL CADET SQUADRON 463RD COMPOSITE SQUADRON, Kissimmee

=== Aerospace education ===
Civil Air Patrol offers numerous products and programs—free to members—in fulfillment of both its Internal (cadets and senior members) and External (educators and students) Aerospace Education mission. Explore the Aerospace Education section of the Civil Air Patrol website at GoCivilAirPatrol.com for information on specific programs including STEM Kits, the K-6th grade Aerospace Connections in Education (ACE)program, Aerospace Education Excellence (AEX), Teacher Orientation Program (TOP) flights (in CAP aircraft), and more. Florida Wing maintained educational partnerships with 76 high schools; supported the National Space Familiarization Course; and provided a space flight orientation course.

== Organization ==
Florida Wing is divided into nine groups across the state, with each squadron or flight being assigned to a group based on its geographical location. The Wing comprises 21 Cadet Squadrons, 7 Senior Squadrons, 29 Composite Squadrons (composed of both Cadets and Senior Members), and the Support and Legislative Squadrons.

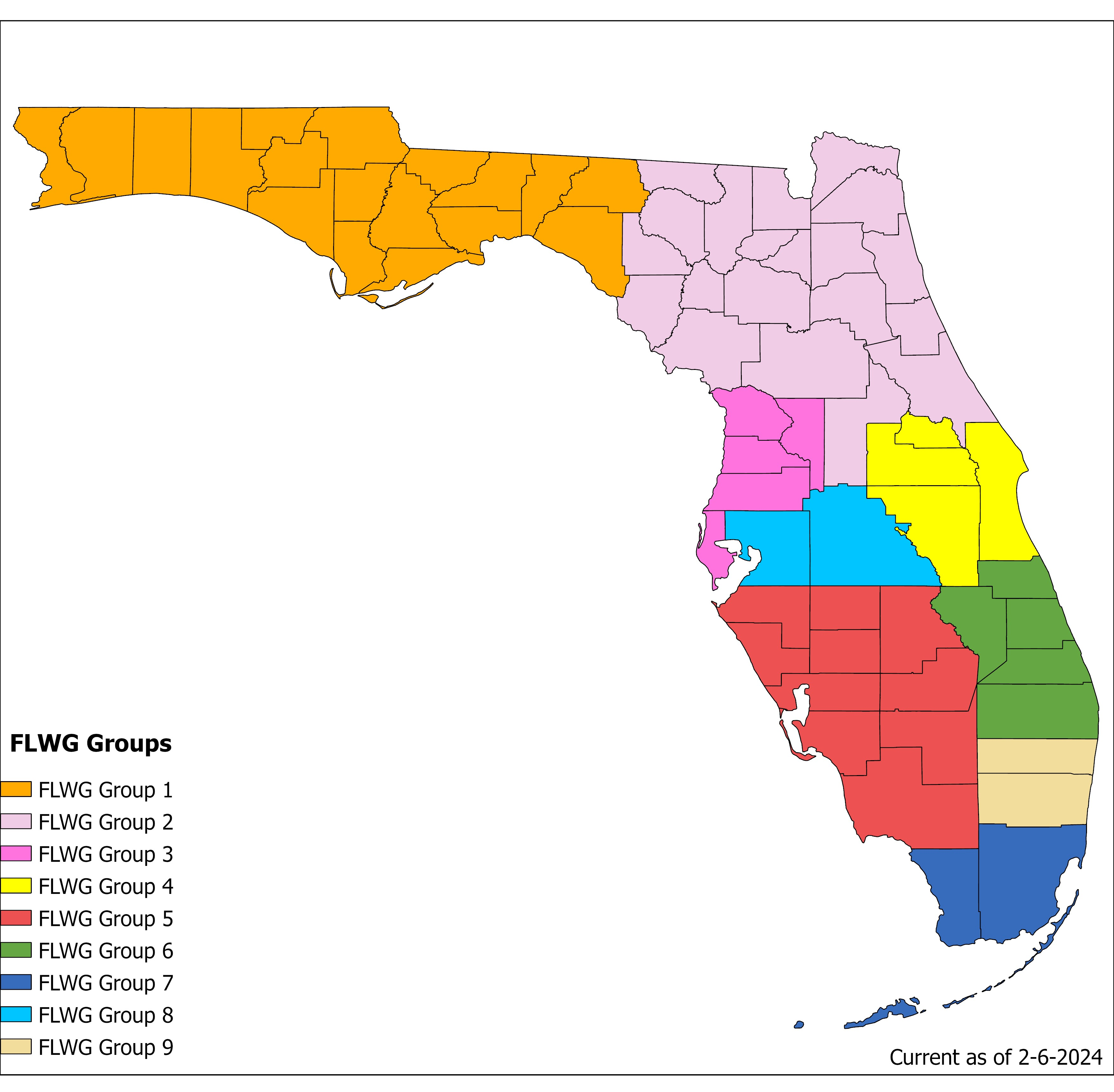
Florida Wing Group and County Boundaries

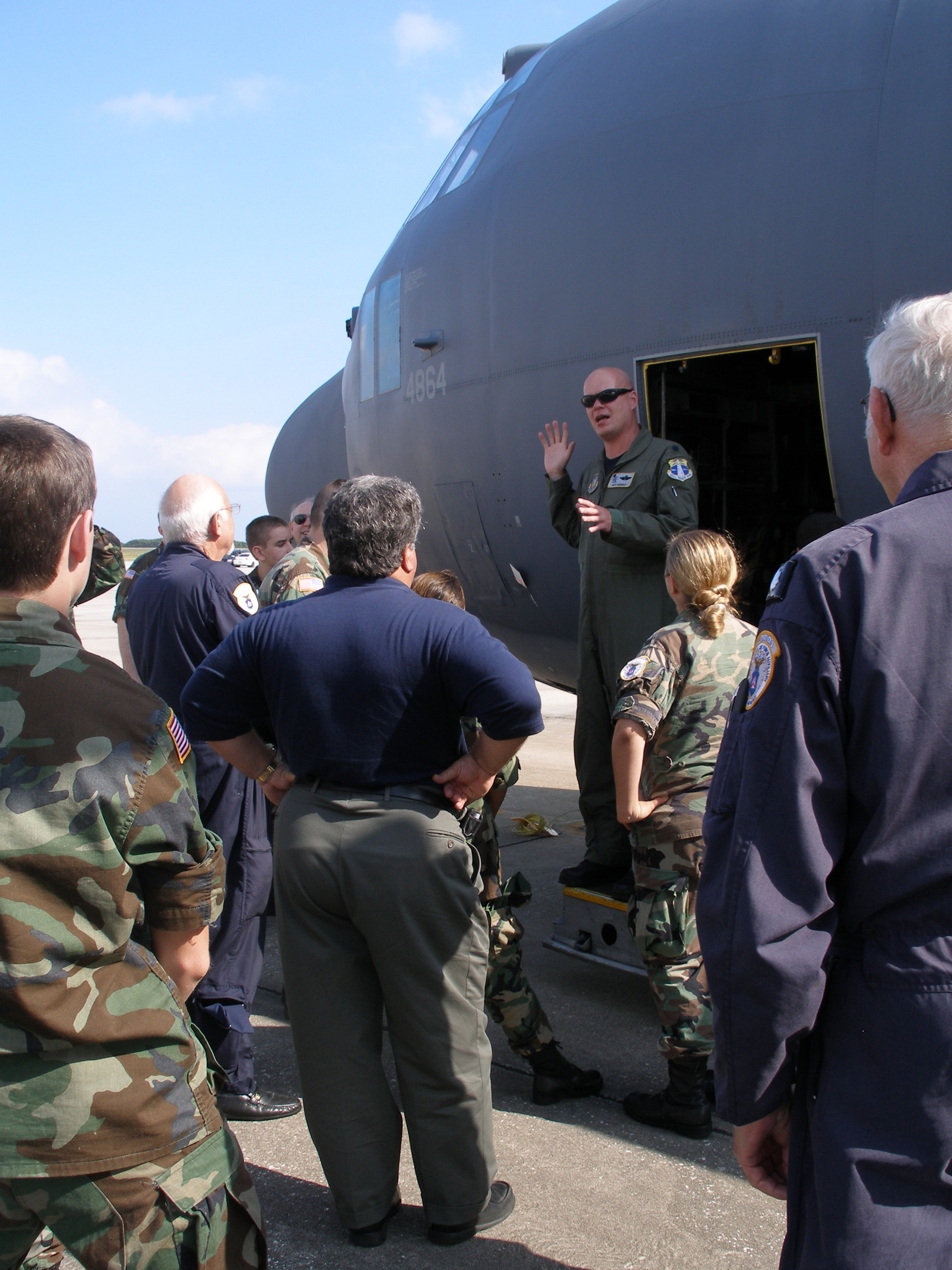
A group of Florida Civil Air Patrol cadets visit the 920th Rescue Wing at Patrick AFB.

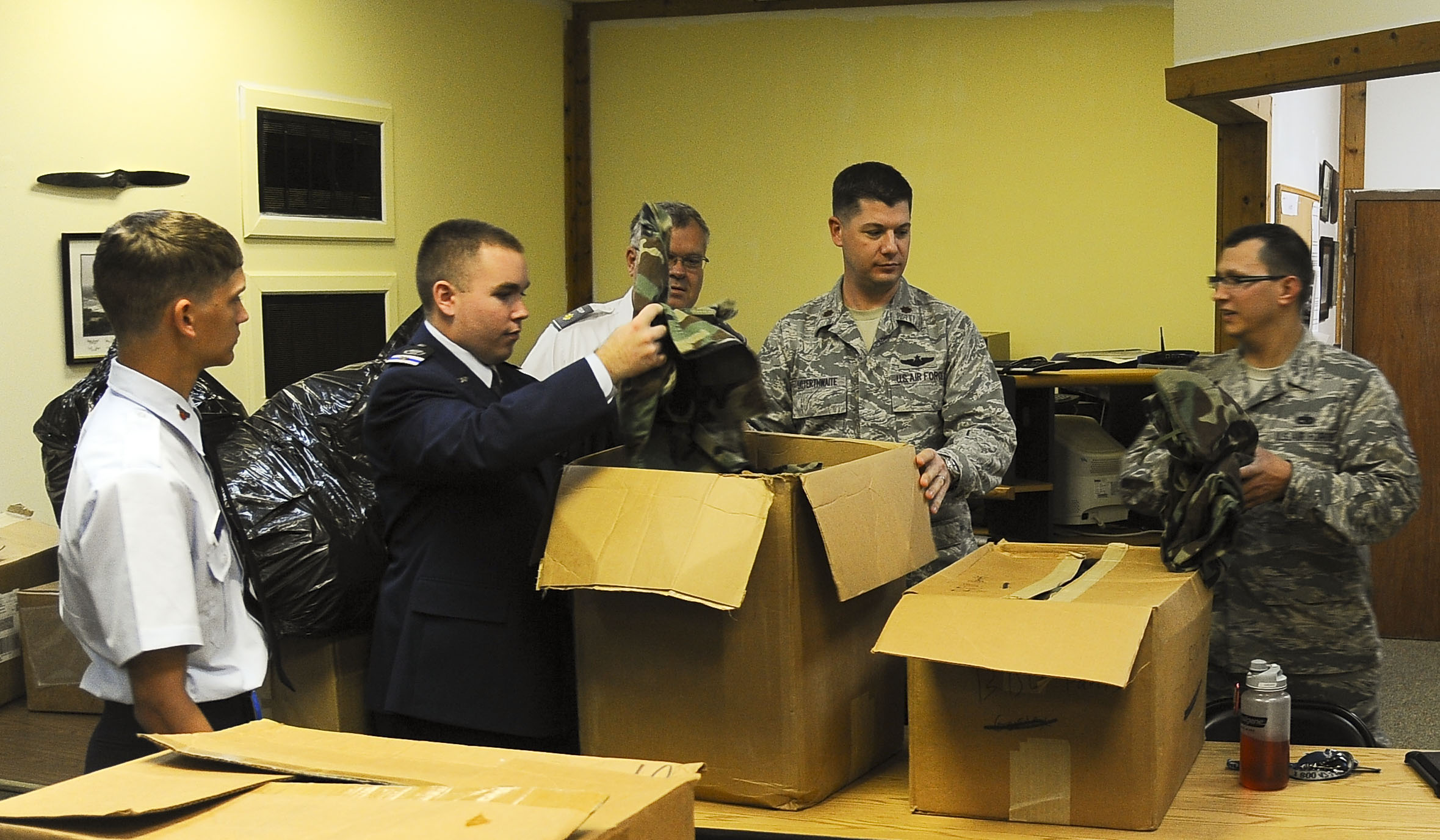
Members of the 89th MacDill Aviation Cadet Squadron sort through boxes of donated BDUs they received at MacDill AFB.

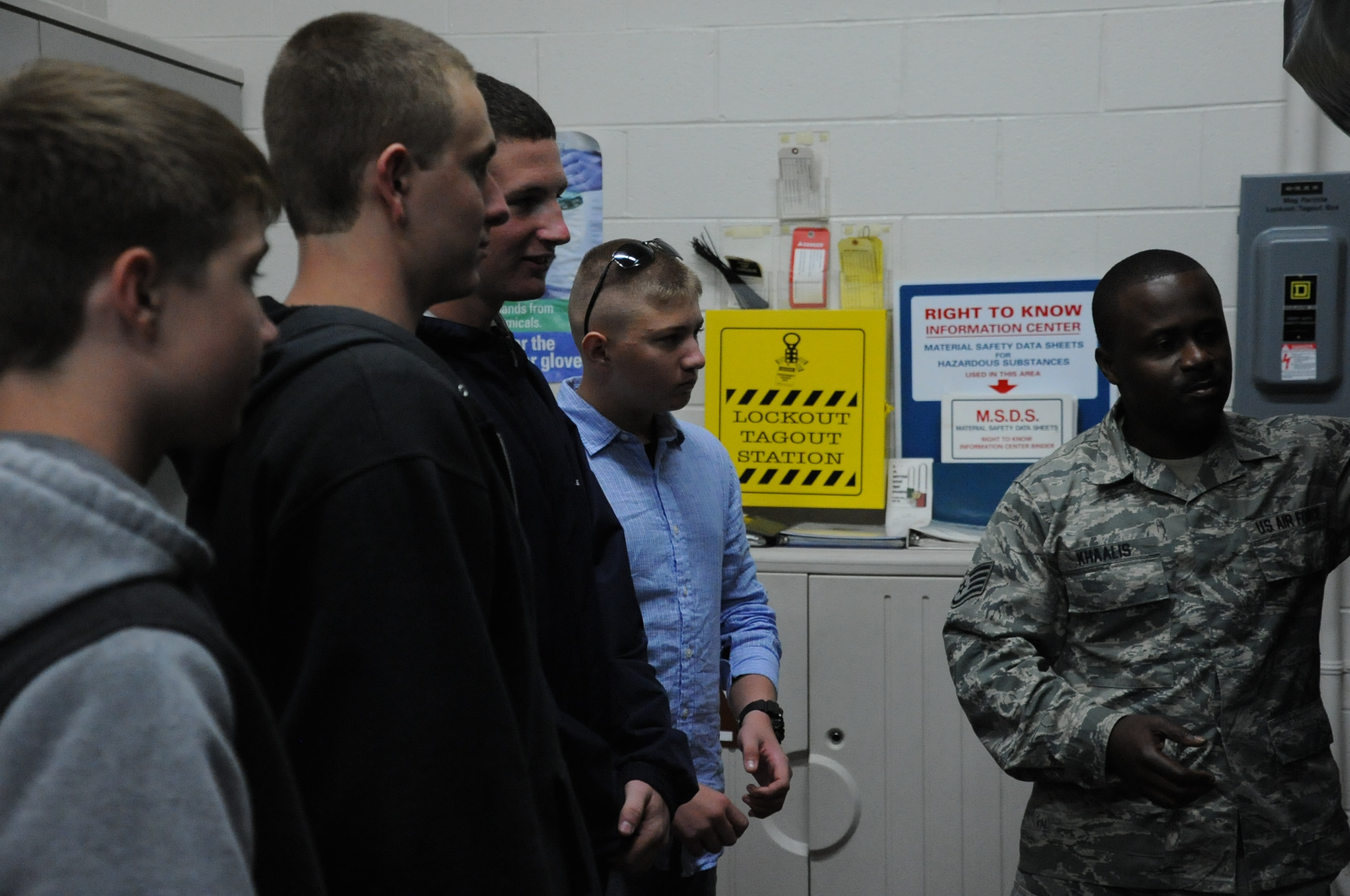
SSgt Khaalis shows cadets from the Clearwater Composite Squadron how the Charleston AFB Nondestructive Inspection shop uses x-rays to detect cracks, delaminations, voids, processing defects and heat damage on aircraft structures and parts.

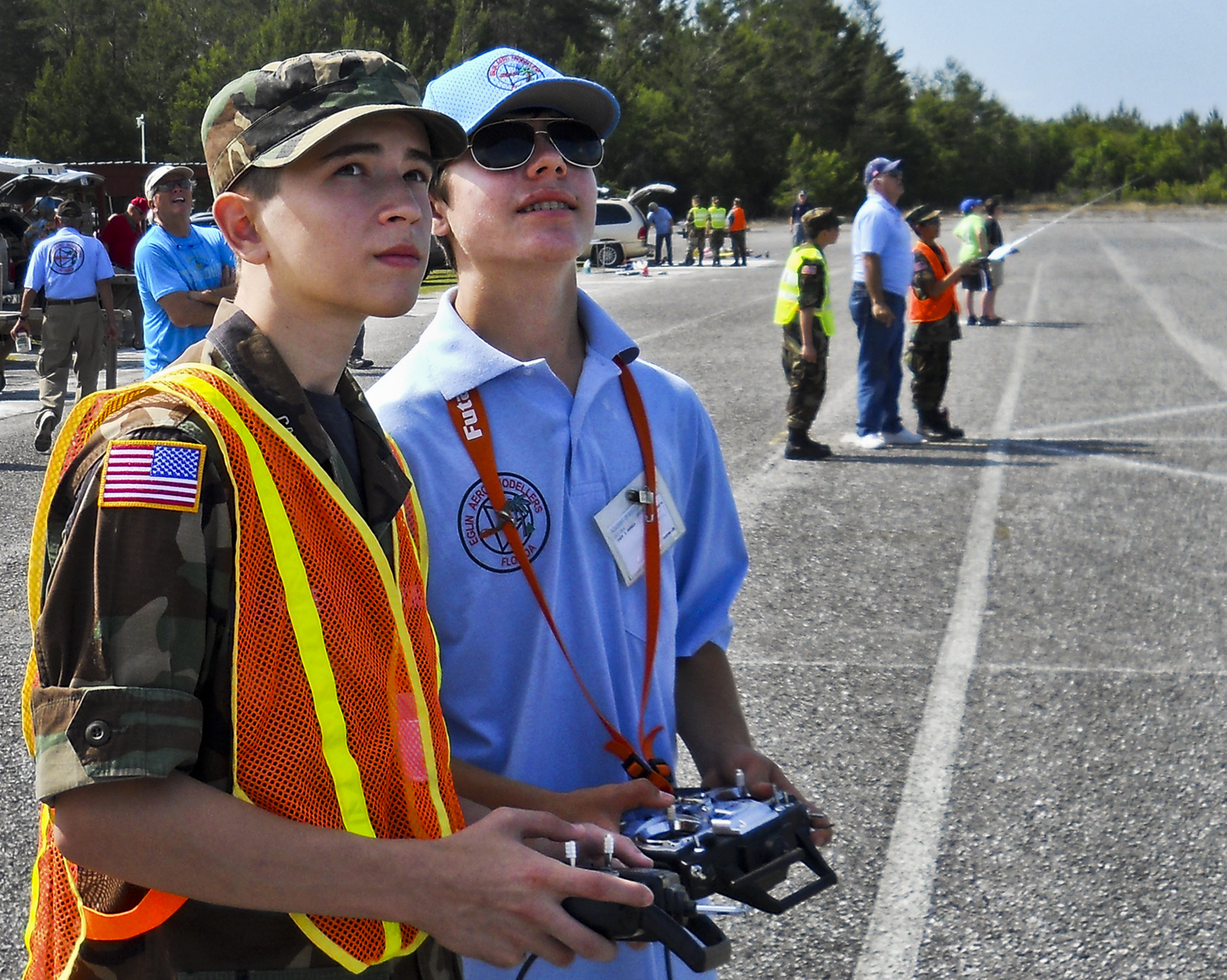
Cody Powell, 13-year-old son of Maj Jeff Powell, USAFR, the 919th Maintenance Operations Flight commander, helps a member of Eglin's Civil Air Patrol learn to fly a radio controlled aircraft.

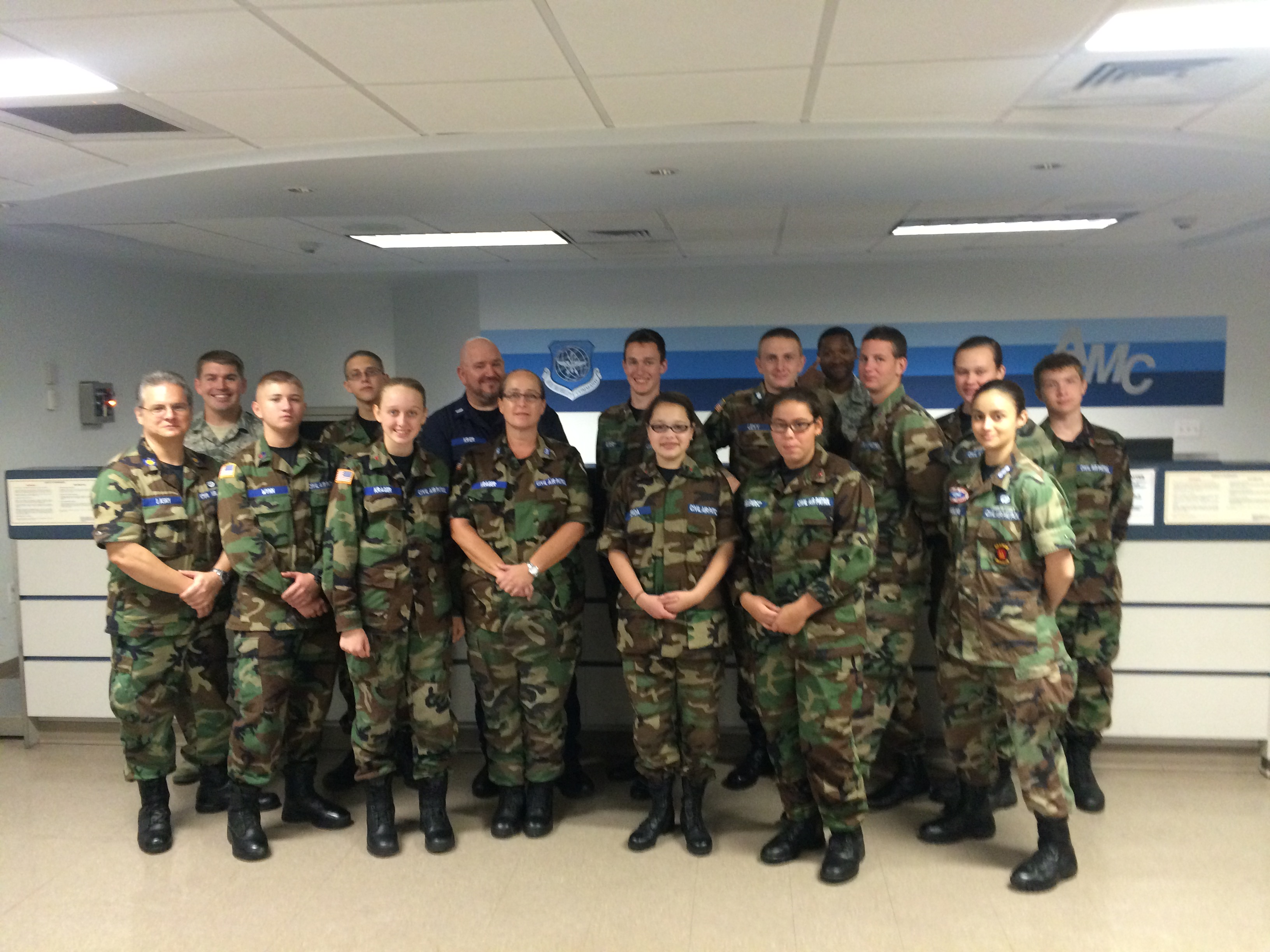
Members of Civil Air Patrol from the Clearwater Composite Squadron prepare for a flight out of MacDill AFB on a C-17 Globemaster III.

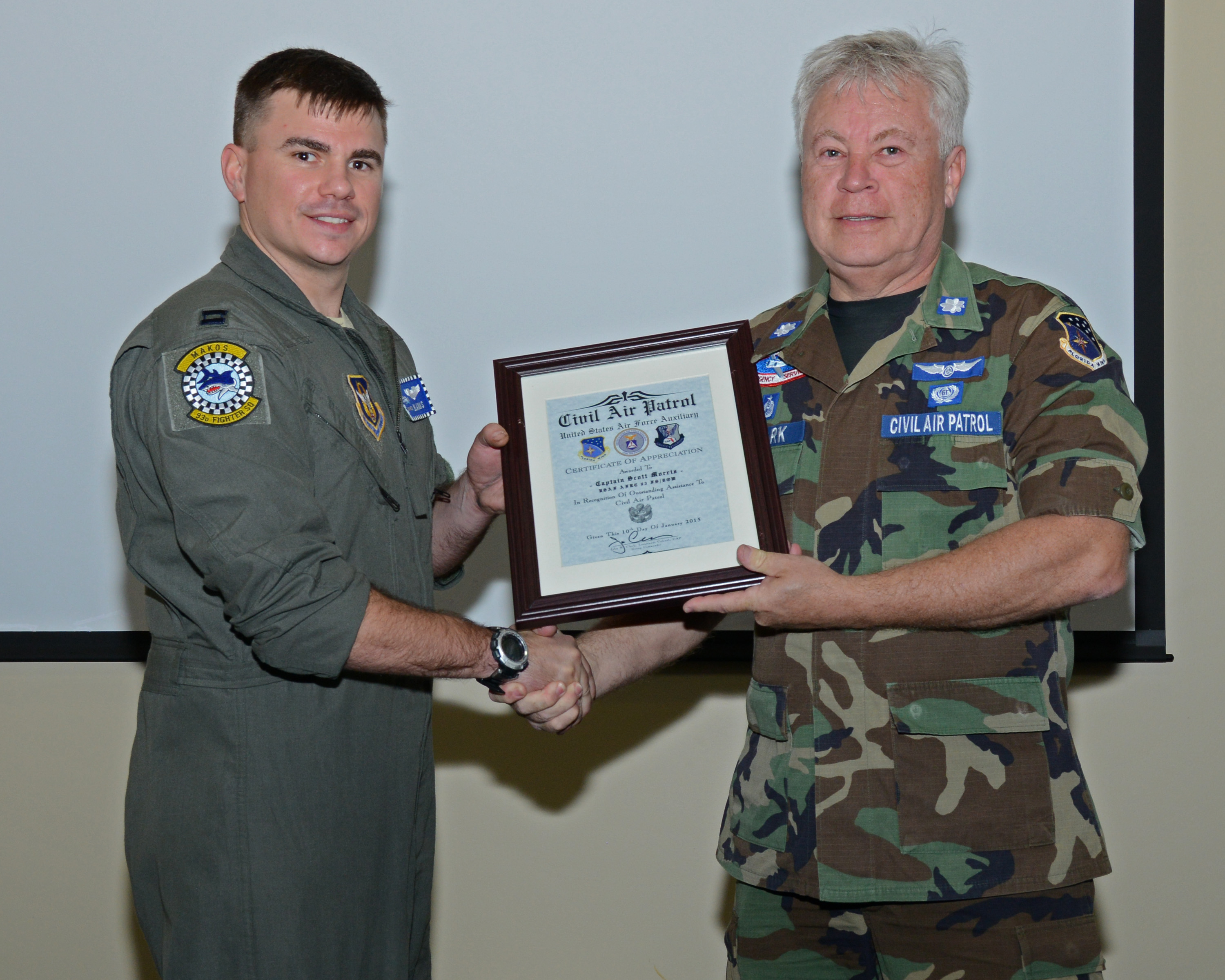
Lt Col John Clark, CAP, Commander of Civil Air Patrol Group 6, presents Capt Scott Morris, USAFR, 93rd Fighter Squadron pilot, with a certificate of appreciation at Homestead Air Reserve Base.

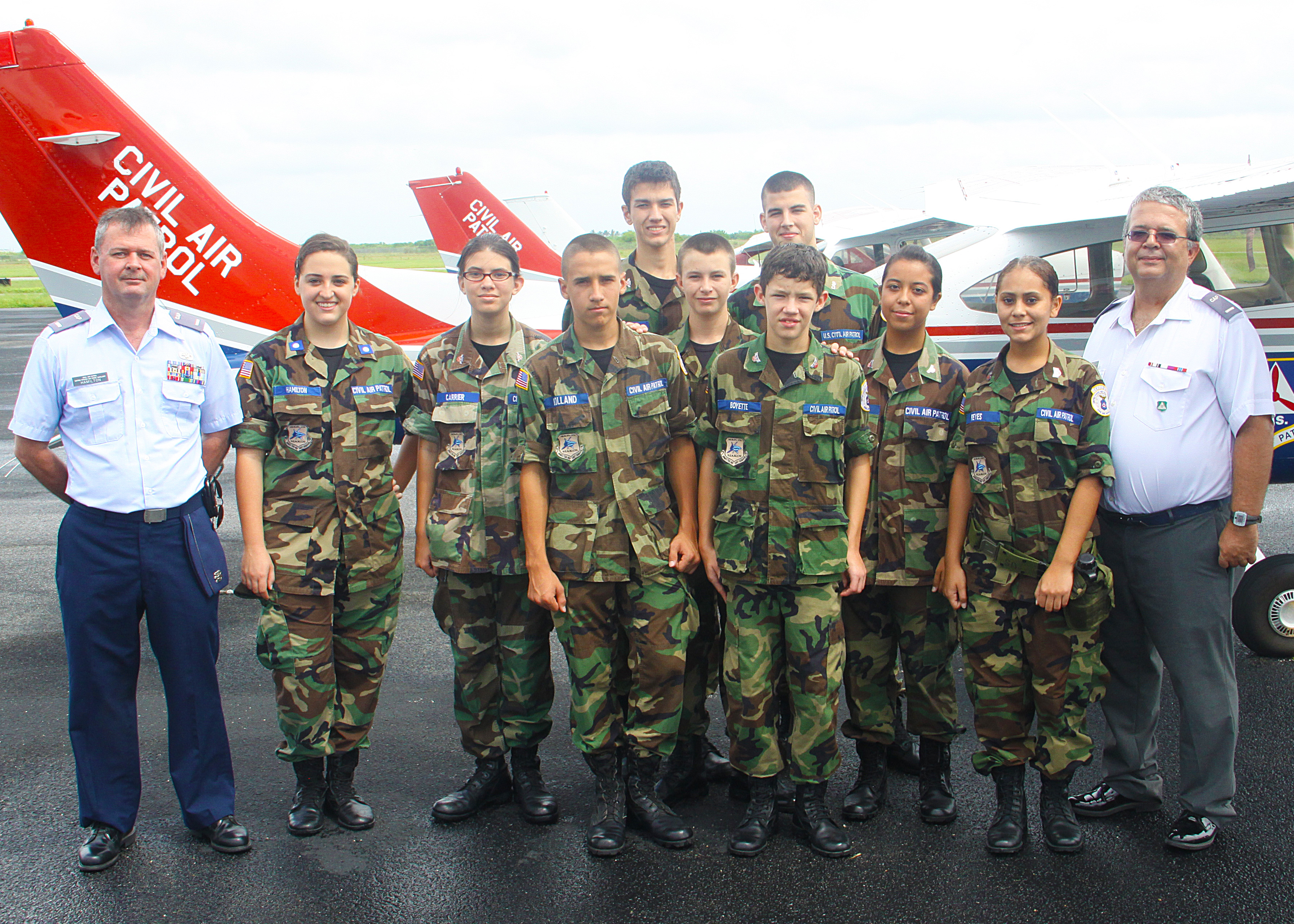
Cadets and senior members of the Homestead Air Reserve Base Composite Sqdn during a Young Eagles Flight event at Homestead General Aviation Airport.

Florida Wing Units
| Group | Charter No. | Unit Name | Location | Notes |
|---|---|---|---|---|
| | SER-FL-000 | Florida Wing Support Squadron | Lakeland | |
| | SER-FL-001 | Florida Wing HQ | Lakeland | |
| | SER-FL-999 | Florida Legislative Squadron | Tallahassee | |
| Group 1 | SER-FL-423 | Eglin Composite Squadron | Eglin Air Force Base | |
| | SER-FL-424 | Emerald Coast Senior Squadron | Pensacola | |
| | SER-FL-425 | Pensacola Cadet Squadron | Pensacola | |
| | SER-FL-432 | Tallahassee Composite Squadron | Tallahassee | |
| | SER-FL-435 | Betty McNabb Composite Squadron | Panama City | |
| | SER-FL-444 | Marianna Composite Squadron | Marianna | |
| Group 2 | SER-FL-021 | Lake Composite Squadron | Tavares | |
| | SER-FL-049 | Ormond Beach Composite Squadron | Ormond Beach | |
| | SER-FL-142 | Gainesville Composite Squadron | Gainesville | |
| | SER-FL-171 | Fruit Cove Cadet Squadron | St. Johns | |
| | SER-FL-173 | Saint Augustine Composite Squadron | St. Augustine | |
| | SER-FL-323 | Fernandina Senior Squadron | Fernandina Beach | |
| | SER-FL-361 | Marion County Composite Squadron | Ocala | |
| | SER-FL-383 | Jacksonville Composite Squadron | Jacksonville | |
| | SER-FL-831 | Liberty Middle School Squadron | Ocala | |
| | SER-FL-607 | Suwannee River Composite Squadron | Branford | |
| Group 3 | SER-FL-066 | St Petersburg Cadet Squadron | St. Petersburg | |
| | SER-FL-182 | Pinellas Senior Squadron | St. Petersburg | |
| | SER-FL-301 | Hernando County Composite Squadron | Brooksville | |
| | SER-FL-447 | Clearwater Composite Squadron | Clearwater | |
| | SER-FL-458 | Wesley Chapel Cadet Squadron | Wesley Chapel | |
| | SER-FL-459 | Zephyr Airport Cadet Squadron | Zephyrhills | |
| | SER-FL-829 | Azalea Middle School Cadet Squadron | St. Petersburg | |
| | SER-FL-828 | Sunlake High School Cadet Squadron | Land O' Lakes | |
| Group 4 | SER-FL-463 | 463rd Composite Squadron | Kissimmee | |
| | SER-FL-267 | Ti-Co Composite Squadron | Titusville | |
| | SER-FL-293 | Patrick Composite Squadron | Satellite Beach | |
| | SER-FL-259 | Central Florida Composite Squadron | Orlando | |
| | SER-FL-116 | Seminole Composite Squadron | Sanford | |
| | SER-FL-122 | Merritt Island Senior Squadron | Merritt Island | |
| Group 5 | SER-FL-314 | Highlands County Composite Squadron | Sebring | |
| | SER-FL-044 | SRQ Composite Squadron | Sarasota | |
| | SER-FL-051 | Charlotte County Composite Squadron | Punta Gorda | |
| | SER-FL-335 | Venice Cadet Squadron | Venice | |
| | SER-FL-023 | Naples Composite Squadron | Naples | |
| | SER-FL-376 | Marco Island Senior Squadron | Marco Island | |
| Group 6 | SER-FL-024 | Stuart Composite Squadron | Port St. Lucie | |
| | SER-FL-457 | Indian River Composite Squadron | Indian River | |
| | SER-FL-054 | Lantana Cadet Squadron | Lantana | |
| | SER-FL-078 | Treasure Coast Composite Squadron | Ft. Pierce | |
| | SER-FL-152 | North Palm Beach County Cadet Squadron | Jupiter | |
| | SER-FL-830 | Pahokee Middle High School Cadet Squadron | Pahokee | |
| Group 7 | SER-FL-076 | Miami Senior Squadron 1 | Opa-Locka | |
| | SER-FL-279 | Homestead Air Reserve Base Cadet Squadron | Homestead Air Reserve Base | |
| | SER-FL-319 | Doral Cadet Squadron | Doral | |
| | SER-FL-355 | Tamiami Composite Squadron | Miami | |
| | SER-FL-462 | Key West Cadet Squadron | Key West | |
| | SER-FL-464 | Opa-Locka Cadet Squadron | Miami Gardens | |
| Group 8 | SER-FL-237 | Brandon Cadet Squadron | Brandon | |
| | SER-FL-089 | 089th MacDill Aviation Cadet Squadron | MacDill Air Force Base | |
| | SER-FL-243 | North Tampa-Lutz Cadet Squadron | Lutz | |
| | SER-FL-274 | Polk County Composite Squadron | Winter Haven | |
| | SER-FL-310 | Hillsborough One Senior Squadron | Tampa | |
| | SER-FL-466 | Lakeland Composite Squadron | Lakeland | |
| Group 9 | SER-FL-011 | North Perry Composite Squadron | Pembroke Pines | |
| | SER-FL-016 | Coral Springs Cadet Squadron | Coral Springs | |
| | SER-FL-286 | Pines-Miramar Composite Squadron | Hollywood | |
| | SER-FL-337 | Fort Lauderdale Composite Squadron | Ft. Lauderdale | |
| | SER-FL-372 | Boca Raton Composite Squadron | Boca Raton | |
| | SER-FL-606 | Gold Coast Senior Squadron | Ft. Lauderdale | |
| | SER-FL-811 | Crystal Lake MS Cadet Squadron | Pompano Beach | |

== Legal protection ==
Under the State of Florida Civil Air Patrol Leave Act, members of Civil Air Patrol who are employed within the boundaries of Florida, by a company which employs fifteen or more people, are allowed up to fifteen days of unpaid leave annually for the purpose of participating in Civil Air Patrol training or missions. Employees will not be required to use accrued vacation or sick leave or any other type of accrued leave prior to taking unpaid Civil Air Patrol leave, but may choose to use such benefits. Employers are forbidden from requiring Civil Air Patrol members to use vacation, annual, compensatory, or similar leave time for the period during which the member was on Civil Air Patrol leave. Employers are also forbidden from penalizing or firing employees for taking Civil Air Patrol leave. These employee rights are codified under Florida Statutes § 252.55.

== See also ==
- Florida Air National Guard
- Florida Naval Militia
- Florida State Guard
