= Pennsylvania State Guard =

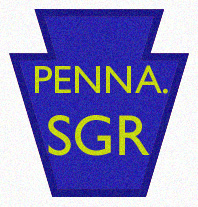
- Pennsylvania State Guard insignia.
- Active: 1941–1948; 1950–1953
- Disbanded: 1953
- Country: United States
- Allegiance: Pennsylvania
- Branch: Army
- Type: State defense force
- Role: Military reserve force
- Size: 5,700
- Equipment: M1903 Springfield; M50 Reising

Commanders
- Commanding Officer: Brigadier General Robert M. Vail

The Pennsylvania State Guard (originally known as the Pennsylvania Reserve Defense Corps) is the currently inactive official state defense force of the state of Pennsylvania, which was active during World War II and the Korean War. The unit was organized as a home guard composed of volunteers who were trained and organized as parallel to the state's National Guard. As a part of Pennsylvania's official militia, the Pennsylvania State Guard was trained, organized, and funded by the state of Pennsylvania, answered to the governor, and could not be federalized or deployed abroad.

== History of predecessor units ==
Both the National Guard of the United States and state defense forces trace their roots to the state militias which made up the majority of the military forces of the United States before the Militia Act of 1903 went into effect, creating the modern National Guard system. Prior to this act, the United States maintained a small, full-time military which would be supplemented by state volunteer units during war. During the American Revolutionary War, Pennsylvania produced various militia units in support of the Patriot cause. In the American Civil War, Pennsylvania supplied multiple units in support of the Union cause. In the Spanish–American War, eighteen regiments, as well as several cavalry, artillery, and engineering units, and the Pennsylvania Naval Militia were raised in Pennsylvania to fight in the war. The Pennsylvania Reserve Militia was organized as a home guard during World War I.

== World War II ==
During World War II, the entire National Guard was federalized, leaving individual states vulnerable to invasion, insurrection, natural disasters, rioting, and other emergencies which could no longer be handled by the National Guard. As a result, State Guard Act signed by President Franklin D. Roosevelt on October 21, 1940, giving individual states the option to create and maintain their own military forces independent of the federal government. The Pennsylvania Reserve Defense Corps was created by executive order of Governor Arthur B. James on March 19, 1941. The Pennsylvania Reserve Defense Corps was organized based on U.S. Army standards, with units being organized along standard military unit sizes and drilling part-time, generally one night a week and during one full week per year. On May 3, 1943, the name was changed by an Act of Assembly to the Pennsylvania State Guard. The unit would serve in a homeland security role for the duration of the war.

=== Membership ===
The draft left few men available for stateside military service; men waiting to be drafted and men too old or otherwise unfit for federal duty made up the potential recruiting pool, so age standards were relaxed considerably. Membership was open to individuals aged 21 to 50, with no upper age limit for officers.

=== Organization ===
Initially, the unit was organized as a single brigade, divided into three regiments, with each regiment containing three battalions, each battalion containing three companies, and each company containing two platoons of roughly thirty men each, with a total of 1,934 men making up the brigade upon creation of the force. At its peak, the force would grow to include 5,700 men organized into various units, including the following units:

- 1st Regiment
- 2nd Regiment
- 4th Regiment
- 10th Regiment
- 16th Regiment
- 1st Cavalry Squadron
  - C Troop, 1st Cavalry Squadron (separate mechanized cavalry unit)
- 1st Engineer Battalion.

=== Equipment ===
Weapons provided by the state included the M1903 Springfield rifle and the M50 Reising submachine gun, although officers were expected to provide their own sidearms. Private organizations also contributed equipment to units. Non-lethal supplies, including woolen socks and gloves, were donated by Chapter 44 of B'nai B'rith, a Jewish service organization, and mattresses and sheets for the Regimental Medical Detachment were donated by Liberty Chapter No. 22, Disabled American War Veterans.

=== Duties ===
As a state defense force, the Pennsylvania State Guard was responsible for the stateside duties of the National Guard. This could include potentially repelling an invasion, quelling a riot, or responding to a natural disaster.

For the duration of the war, responsibilities were divided among the units of the Guard based on their geographical location. The First Regiment was responsible for guarding the bridges near the eastern Pennsylvania cities and towns of Phillipsburg, Washington Park, Lambertville, Yardley, Trenton, Norristown, Reading and Columbia.

The 2nd Regiment (minus E Company) was responsible for guarding the bridges near the central Pennsylvania cities and towns of Sunbury, Northumberland, Williamsport, Jersey Shore, Muncy, Berwick, Plymouth, Wilkes-Barre, Pittston, Falls, Oil City, Tionesta, Franklin and Elmerton.

The 3rd Regiment was responsible for guarding the bridges near the western Pennsylvania cities or towns of Warren, Parker, East Brady, Freeport and New Kensington, and in coordination with local authorities concerning the bridges at Pittsburgh, Saltsburg, Blairsville, Ambridge, Sewickley, Elizabeth, Monongahela, Donora, Monessen, Brownsville, and Masontown.

The Brigade Headquarters Company was responsible for the 24-hour safety of the state airport at Marsh Run and 24-hour roving patrol of the bridges spanning the Susquehanna River at Harrisburg.

E Company of the 2nd Regiment was responsible for covering the Clarks Ferry Bridge and the Juniata crossing and maintaining night security on the State Arsenal at Harrisburg.

== Korean War ==
Following the federalization of the 28th Infantry Division of the Pennsylvania National Guard, the State Guard was reorganized. It closely emulated its World War II model, with the main differences being that during the Korean War the Guard was organized as a division instead of a brigade, and that regimental commanders were required to be military veterans who had seen combat overseas, and company grade officers were required to have served in the military overseas.

== Disbandment ==
Following the cessation of hostilities at the end of the Korean War, the State Guard was disbanded.

== Legal status ==
State defense forces are permitted by the federal government under Title 32, Section 109 of the United States Code. Pennsylvania law also recognizes the authority of the Governor of Pennsylvania to create and maintain a state defense force. Currently, 23 states and the territory of Puerto Rico take advantage of this legislation by maintaining active state defense forces. Therefore, the state of Pennsylvania could reestablish a state defense force either through a legislative act or an executive order.

== Reactivation effort ==
In 2019, Pennsylvania State Representative Chris Rabb proposed legislation which would reactivate and modernize the Pennsylvania State Guard in order to "address the epidemic of gun violence, domestic terrorism, and other inter-related public health crises."

Since the 1990s, a group formerly called the Pennsylvania State Military Reserve (Now the Pennsylvania State Defense Force or PASDF) has been campaigning the state of Pennsylvania for the reactivation and for their recognition as the states official state defense force. Although still in 501(c)3 status, the group continues to hold drills and trainings. They wear a modified version of the current Army Combat Uniform and have participated in local search and rescue missions and ceremonial events.

== See also ==
- Naval militia
- Pennsylvania Wing Civil Air Patrol
- United States Coast Guard Auxiliary
