= State defense force =

Military units under the sole control of a U.S. state government

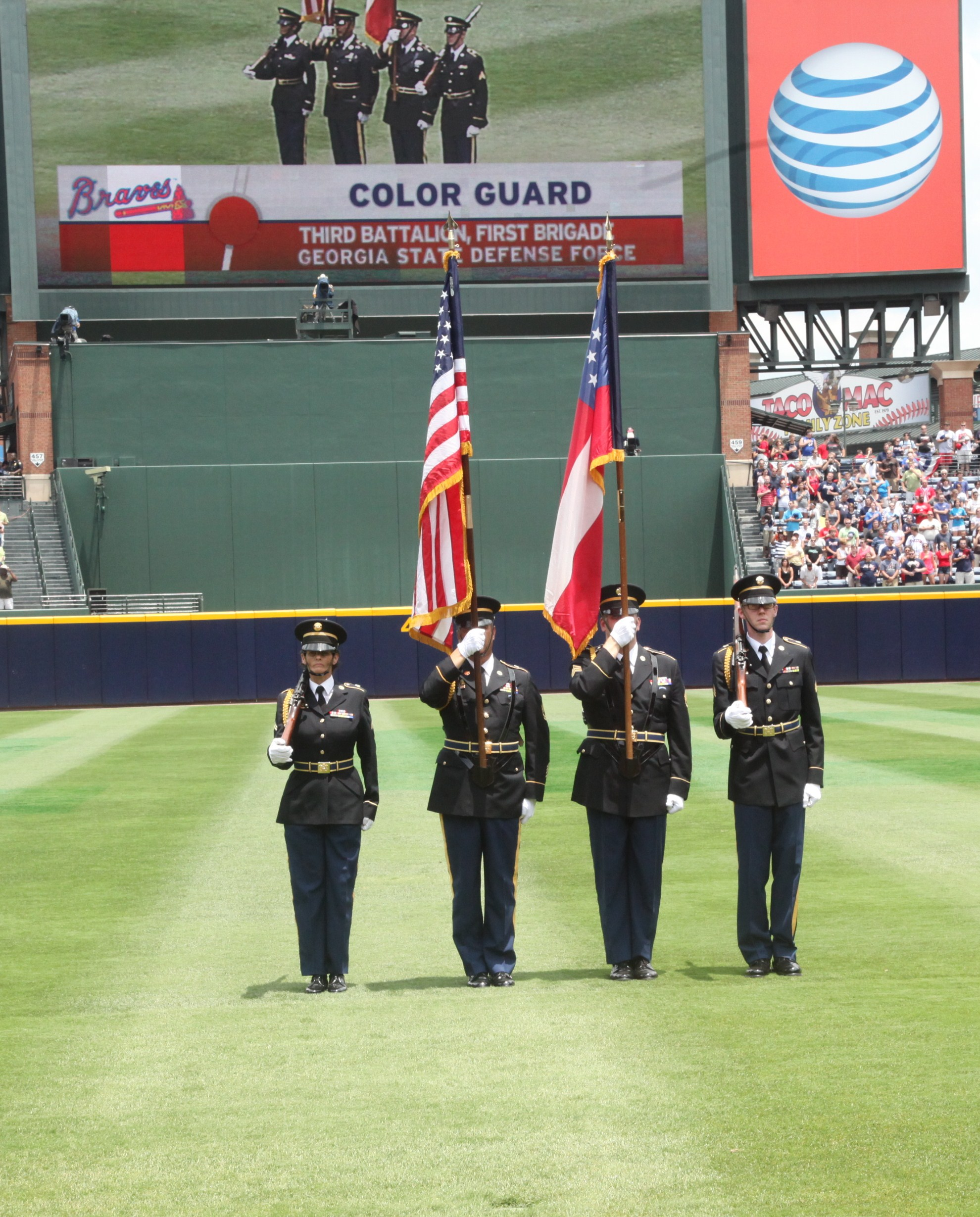
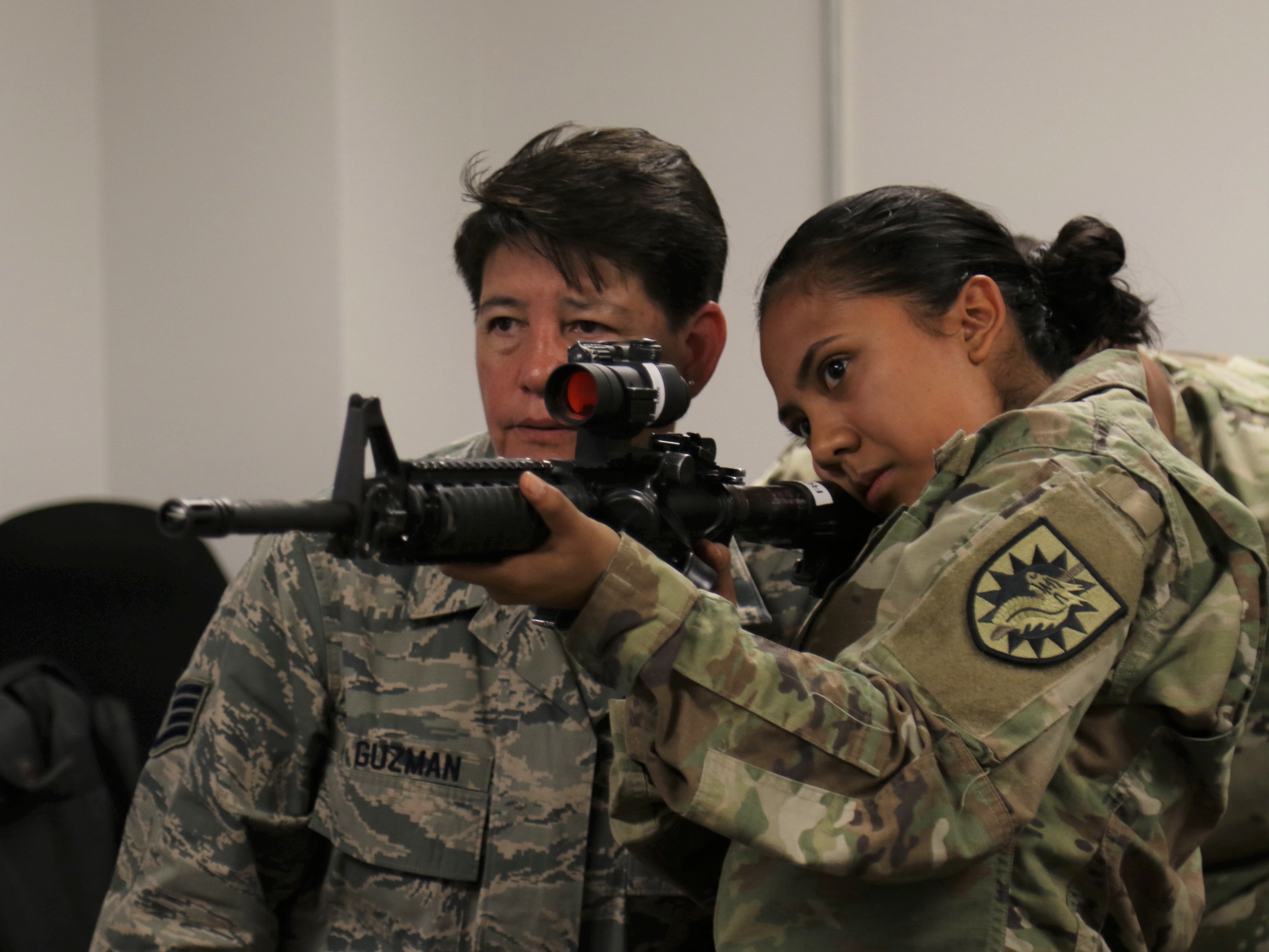
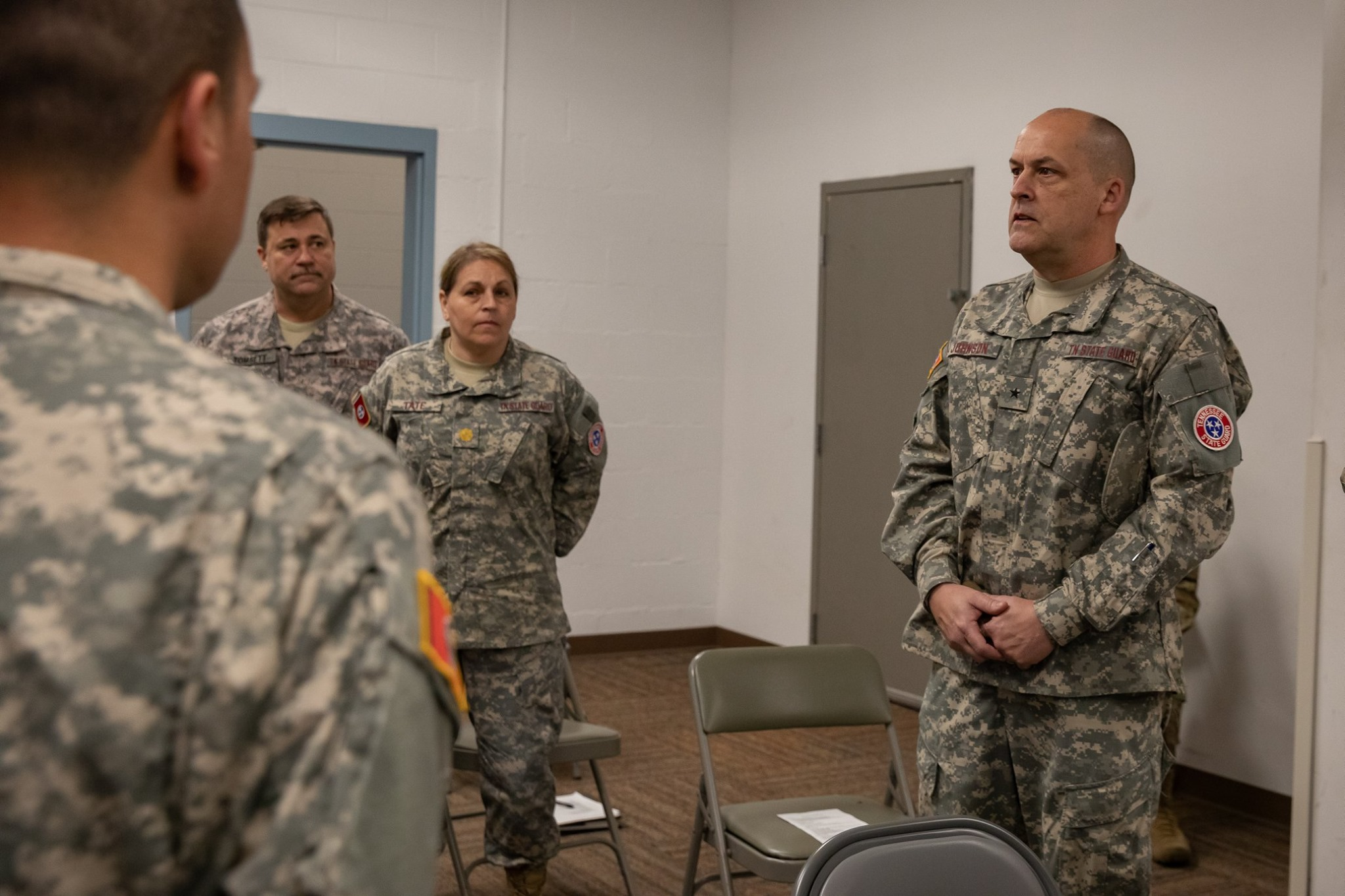
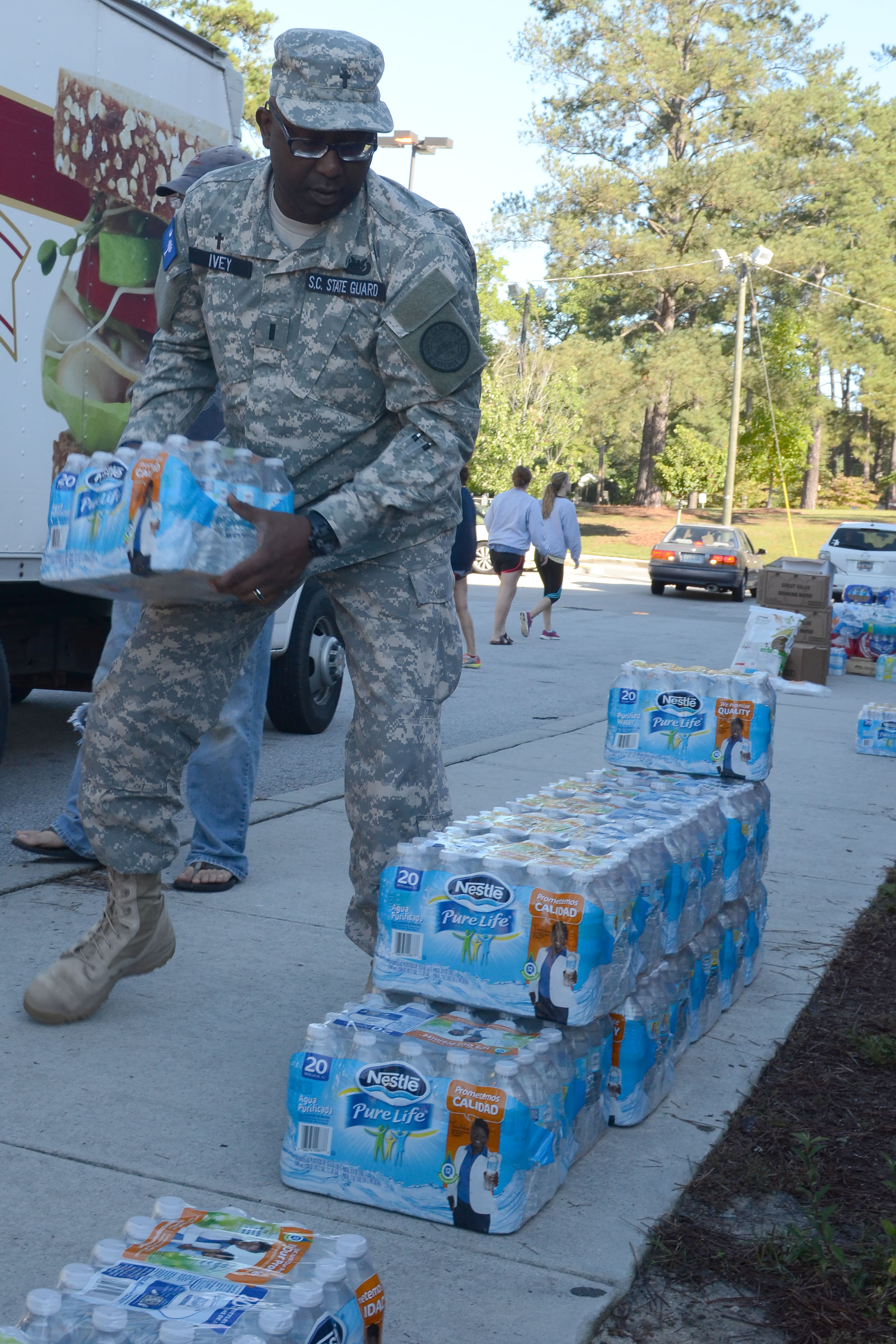
Top left: The Georgia State Defense Force color guard. Top right: A California State Guard member provides a California National Guardsman marksmanship instruction when using an M4 carbine. Bottom left: Members of the Tennessee State Guard prepare to deploy to provide medical support for the fight against COVID-19. Bottom right: A South Carolina State Guard member distributes drinking water following a flood.

In the United States, state defense forces (SDFs) are military units that operate under the sole authority of a state government. State defense forces are authorized by state and federal law and are under the command of the governor of each state.

State defense forces are distinct from their state's National Guard in that they cannot become federal entities. All state National Guard personnel (including the National Guard of the District of Columbia, the Commonwealth of Puerto Rico and the territories of Guam and the Virgin Islands) can be federalized under the National Defense Act Amendments of 1933 with the creation of the National Guard of the United States. This provides the basis for integrating units and personnel of the Army National Guard into the U.S. Army and, since 1947, units and personnel of the Air National Guard into the U.S. Air Force.

The federal government recognizes state defense forces, as per the Compact Clause of the U.S. Constitution, under 32 U.S.C. § 109 which provides that state defense forces as a whole may not be called, ordered, or drafted into the armed forces of the United States, thus preserving their separation from the National Guard. However, under the same law, individual members serving in the state defense force are not exempt from service in the armed forces (i.e., they are not excluded from the draft). Under 32 USC § 109(e), "A person may not become a member of a defense force ... if he is a member of a reserve component of the armed forces."

Nearly every state has laws authorizing state defense forces, and 19 states, plus the Commonwealth of Puerto Rico, have active forces with different levels of activity, support, and strength. State defense forces generally operate with emergency management and homeland security missions. Most SDFs are organized as ground units, but air and naval units also exist. Depending on the state, they may be variously named as state military, state military force, state guard, state militia, or state military reserve.

Every state defense force is also the command authority for the "unorganized militia", which is defined as every able bodied male between the age of 17 and 45 who is not already serving in some capacity within the armed forces or National Guard. The original concept of the unorganized militia being a citizen army which could be raised immediately in times of extreme national emergency. In the modern day military, the unorganized militia is considered obsolete with very few exceptions. One of the only recognized instances where unorganized militia members wear uniforms and actively perform military duties is the Virginia militia which actively employs officers amongst the various military schools in the state of Virginia.

== History ==
=== Origins ===
From its founding until the early 1900s, the United States maintained only a minimal army and relied on state militias to supply the majority of its troops, with the training and readiness of the latter varying widely. As a result of the Spanish–American War and the performance of the militias and other volunteer units during that conflict, Congress was called upon to reform and regulate the training and qualification of state militias. In 1903, with passage of the Militia Act of 1903, the predecessor to the modern-day National Guard was formed. It required the states to divide their militias into two sections. The law recommended the title "National Guard" for the first section, for federal administration, and "Reserve Militia" for the individual states.

=== World War I ===
During World War I, Congress authorized the states to maintain Home Guards, which were reserve forces outside the National Guard forces that were then being deployed by the Federal Government as part of the National Army. The secretary of war was authorized to furnish these Home Guard units with rifles, ammunition, and supplies.

=== Interwar years ===
In 1933, Congress finalized the split between the National Guard and the traditional state militias by mandating that all federally funded soldiers take a dual enlistment/commission and thus enter both the state National Guard and the newly created National Guard of the United States, a federal reserve force.

=== World War II ===
In 1940, with the onset of World War II and as a result of its federalizing the National Guard, Congress amended the National Defense Act of 1916, and authorized the states to maintain "military forces other than National Guard."

=== Cold War ===
In 1950, with the outbreak of the Korean War and at the urging of the National Guard, Congress reauthorized the separate state military forces for a time period of two years. These state military forces were authorized military training at federal expense, as well as "arms, ammunition, clothing, and equipment," as deemed necessary by the secretary of the Army. At the end of the two years, however, they were not reauthorized under federal law.

In 1956, Congress finally revised the law and authorized "state defense forces" permanently under Title 32, Section 109, of the United States Code. Two years later, Congress amended the law and changed the name from "State defense forces" to "defense forces." Still, it was not until the early Ronald Reagan administration that many states developed their defense forces into elements that existed beyond paper, when the U.S. Department of Defense actively encouraged states to create and maintain SDF units.

By the late 1980s, however, a series of high-profile reports caused several states to shut down or significantly restructure their forces. In 1987, the governor of Utah removed all but 31 officers from the Utah State Guard, after a probe revealed that its ranks were "peppered with neo-Nazis, felons and mental patients." Meanwhile, in 1990, the Virginia General Assembly launched an investigation and subsequent overhaul of its state's force after receiving tips that the volunteers were "saving money to buy a tank."

=== Contemporary ===
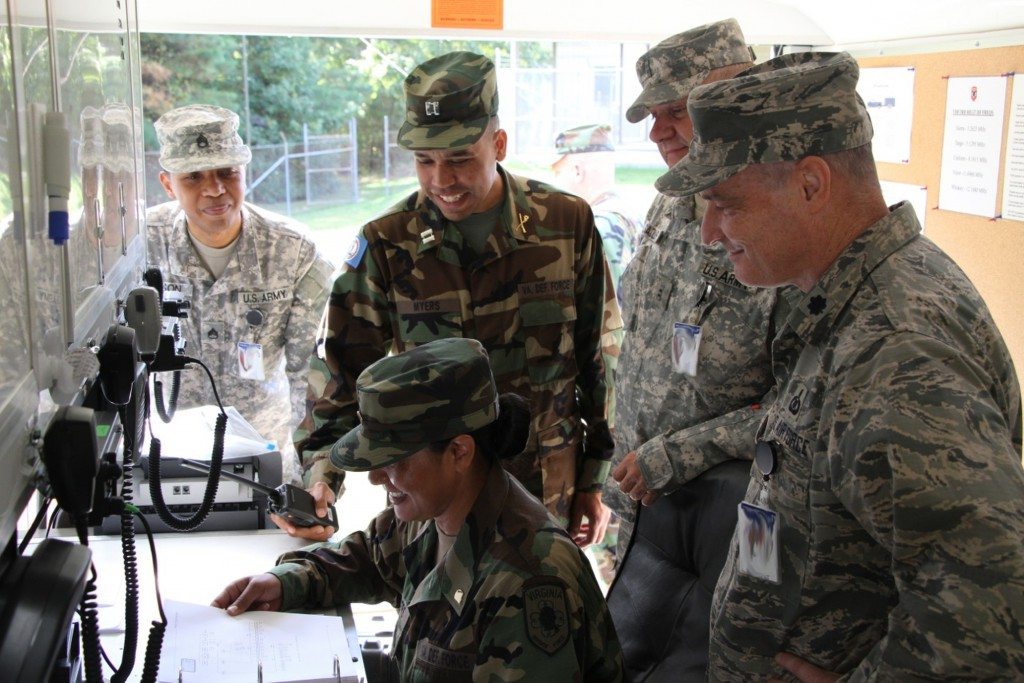
Members of the Virginia Defense Force and the Virginia National Guard operate a mobile command post.

With the end of the Cold War came a general decrease of interest in state defense forces. The September 11 attacks, however, generated additional attention and, with it, greater scrutiny from some in the United States military who questioned the training and equipment of the units and whether they provided an outlet for "warrior wannabes" who would not otherwise qualify for service in the armed forces.

In 2008, Alaska disarmed its state defense force after an investigation concluded the lack of training intensity or standardization was a potential legal liability to the state. By 2010 the status of the force had been downgraded even further, with the Adjutant-General of the Alaska National Guard informing volunteers that they would only be called upon as a "reserve of last resort to be used only in the most extreme emergencies." The ASDF remained deliberately hamstrung for several years, until Governor Bill Walker overruled the Adjutant-General in 2016 when he announced his intention to reform the Alaska State Defense Force by expanding it further into rural Alaska and improving training standards.

Further controversy was stoked by a New York Times report which found many senior officers in the New York Guard had little or no formal military training despite holding, in some cases, general officer ranks. The former commander of the force, Pierre David Lax, noted that, "if you are friendly with the governor and you always wanted to be a general, you ask the governor to make you a general, and poof, you are a brigadier general." Another former commander asserted he regularly awarded titles to members of the New York legislature in exchange for their support of budgetary allocations to the force. The report also noted that a majority of the unit's rare deployments involved providing ceremonial support, such as bands and color guards, to the state government.

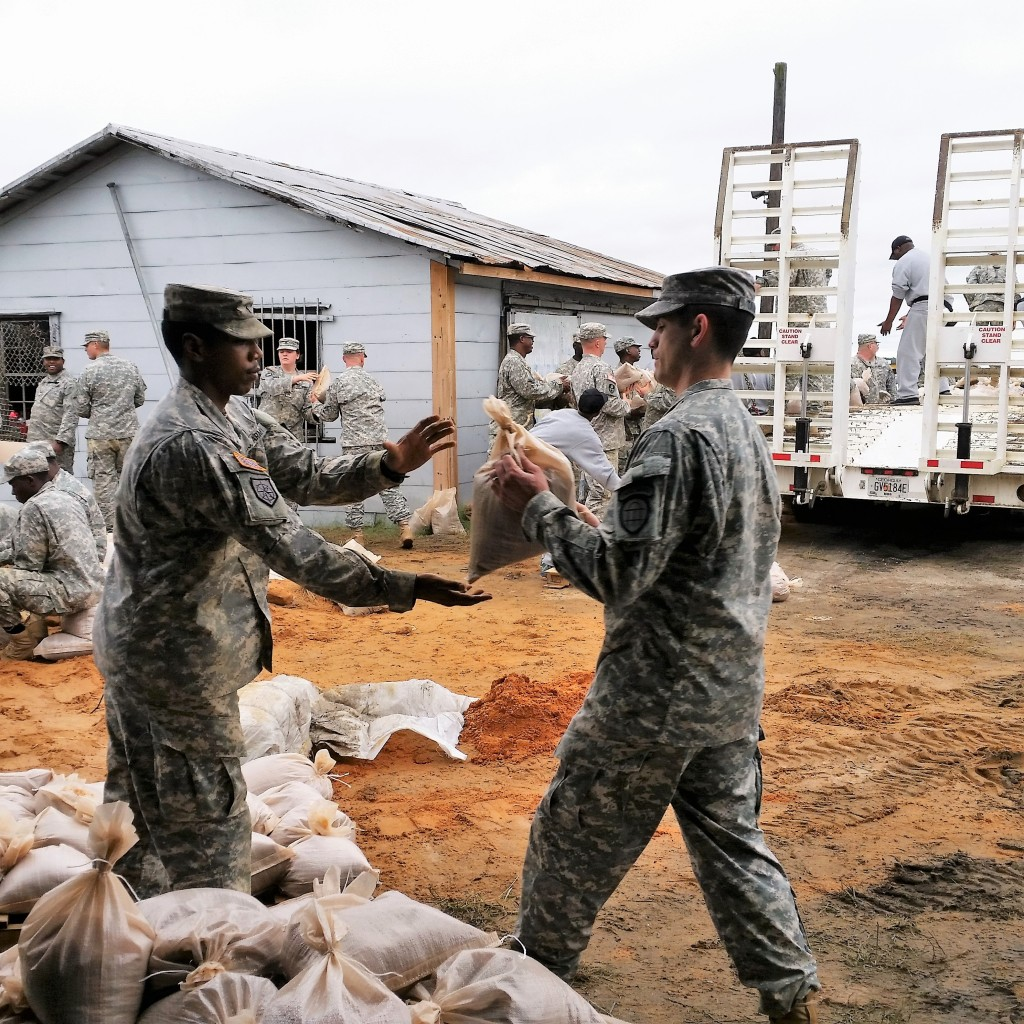
A Georgia State Defense Force Volunteer passes a sandbag to a Georgia Army National Guard Soldier during a flood preparation mission.

An April 2014 Department of Defense report by the Inspector General's office reported confusion and inconsistency among state adjutant generals as to the use and status of state defense forces. The Inspector General's office reported an under-utilization of state defense force capabilities due to a lack of clarity in the US Code regarding the use of SDFs, fueling fear that using funds and assets acquired through the federal government for state defense forces could run afoul of regulations. (While the National Guard is operated by the states, most of their equipment and funding comes from the federal government.) This fear of violating regulations also inhibited their use and integration with their National Guard counterparts, preventing them from conducting joint operations alongside one another, and also from volunteering in support of federal missions. Other problems cited by the Inspector General's office were a lack of standardization in training and physical fitness, raising questions as to the ability of SDFs to work alongside their National Guard counterparts, and a lack of coordination with and support from the Department of Defense. During a survey conducted by the Inspector General of SDF commanders and adjutant generals, 18 of 19 considered their SDFs to be part of the organized militia and subject to the Code of Military Justice, 14 of 18 considered the members of SDFs to be "soldiers", 14 of 18 considered SDF personnel to be "lawful belligerents" under the rules of war, and only 4 of 19 authorized their personnel to conduct firearms training. Almost all of the missions reported to the IG's office were non-military in nature, including small-scale search and rescue, disaster management, and other unarmed, homeland security related-tasks.

Due to public fears over the Jade Helm 15 exercises held throughout a number of southwestern states, on 28 April 2015, Gov. Greg Abbott of Texas ordered a call-up of the Texas State Guard to monitor the exercises and facilitate communication between US special operations forces conducting training and the governor's office.

In early 2020, a number of state defense forces were activated to combat the COVID-19 pandemic. As of April 2020, the Alaska State Defense Force, the California State Guard, the Governor's Guards of Connecticut, the Georgia State Defense Force, the Indiana Guard Reserve, the Maryland Defense Force, the New York Guard, the Ohio Military Reserve, the South Carolina State Guard, the Tennessee State Guard, the Texas State Guard, and the Virginia Defense Force had all contributed members to their respective states' efforts in combating the pandemic.

In 2022, the Florida State Guard was restored, and throughout 2023 and 2024 created aerial, maritime, land, and special units. In 2023, Florida approved a $107 million budget for 2023–2024. In 2024, signifying cross-state cooperation and operations by State defense forces, the Florida State Guard sent troops to Texas to support border operations.

=== Future ===
A 2003 article in the United States Army War College's Parameters journal recommended that "United States Northern Command (NORTHCOM) should ensure that future contingency planning efforts for homeland security operations fully incorporate the valuable capabilities that State Defense Forces can provide." In the decade following that article, however, no significant action has been taken on the recommendation.

Several bills have been unsuccessfully introduced in Congress since the early 1990s seeking to improve the readiness of state defense forces. The most recent, H.R. 206, introduced in 2009 by Rep. Joe Wilson of South Carolina, would have allowed the U.S. secretary of defense to transfer surplus U.S. military equipment to state defense forces. Co-sponsors of the bill included Jim Marshall and Frank Wolf. Congress took no action on the measure before adjourning.

In recent years, state defense forces have focused on retooling their capabilities to be better prepared for future missions by improving their professionalism and interoperability with other agencies. The development of professional commands to support the National Guard, especially medical commands to buttress civil authorities during a civil crisis, has become an emerging trend.

Several state defense forces have begun to shift their focus to preparing for larger emergencies which may require multiple states to coordinate relief efforts. In July 2015, the Virginia Defense Force headed a multi-state communications exercise, the first ever of its kind, where the VDF practiced long-distance radio communications with the Tennessee State Guard, Indiana Guard Reserve, Texas State Guard, and the California State Military Reserve. Further efforts at standardizing training between state defense forces by setting competency requirements have been undertaken by the State Guard Association of the United States, which followed its Military Emergency Management Specialist training program with a JAG Academy an Engineer Specialty Qualification Badge, and plans for a Medical Academy in the future.

Individual states have made efforts to increase their capabilities to be prepared to take on future missions. In March 2017, the California State Military Reserve activated its Maritime Component to lead and assist in future homeland security missions while working in conjunction with other agencies, including the Coast Guard Auxiliary, the California Department of Fish and Wildlife, CalTrans, and other civilian departments. As of May 2017, the Maryland Defense Force has significantly reorganized; the number of available officer billets has been shrunk, and the job descriptions reorganized, in order to avoid having a top-heavy organizational structure. New units, including the Maryland Emergency Management Agency (MEMA) Support Unit, have been approved, and others, such as the MDDF Cyber Unit, have planned expansions. Training standards were also heightened, with the MDDF requiring that drill participation, age, height, and weight requirements be more strictly enforced. Further, all new soldiers are currently required to earn their Military Emergency Management Specialist Badge. These changes were made with the goal that the future MDDF would be able to "seamlessly integrate into missions with the National Guard."

Florida, in its effort to develop its State Guard, in 2023 it received approval to construct its headquarters and training center in Flagler County. In September 2024 it was reported that the Florida State Guard plans to build an airbase at Tallahassee International Airport, with the planned site consisting of two hangars, an office, and accompanying infrastructure.

== List of state defense forces ==
Active Inactive Ceremonial Not established Not authorized under Title 32

There are currently 20 active state defense forces and 5 active naval militias. The Puerto Rico State Guard includes an air support component, the 1st Air Base Group, that support the operations of the Puerto Rico Air National Guard.

State or territory	Status	Ground or air division	Naval division	Air wing	Cyber force	State law	Weapons training	Size of personnel
Alabama	Inactive	Alabama State Defense Force					No	
Alaska	Active	Alaska State Defense Force	Alaska Naval Militia				Yes	
American Samoa	Not authorized under Title 32							
Arizona	Inactive	Arizona State Guard						
Arkansas	Inactive	Arkansas State Guard						
California	Active	California State Guard	Cal Guard Maritime	Yes	Yes		Yes	
Colorado	Inactive*	Colorado State Defense Force						
Connecticut	Ceremonial	Connecticut State Militia Units	Connecticut Naval Militia (inactive)				Yes	
Delaware	Inactive	Delaware State Guard						
District of Columbia	Not established	District of Columbia Reserve Corps	District of Columbia Naval Battalion					
Florida	Active	Florida State Guard	Florida Naval Militia (inactive)				Yes (some units)	1500
Georgia	Active	Georgia State Defense Force	Georgia Naval Militia (inactive)				Yes (some units)	450+
Guam	Inactive	Guam Militia						
Hawai'i	Inactive	Hawaii Territorial Guard	Hawaii Naval Militia					
Idaho	Inactive	Idaho State Guard						
Illinois	Inactive	Illinois State Guard	Illinois Naval Militia					
Indiana	Active	Indiana Guard Reserve	Indiana Naval Militia (inactive)				Yes	
Iowa	Inactive	Iowa State Guard						
Kansas	Inactive	Kansas State Guard						
Kentucky	Inactive	Kentucky Active Militia						
Louisiana	Active	Louisiana State Guard	Louisiana Naval Militia		Yes		Yes	
Maine	Inactive	Maine State Guard						
Maryland	Active	Maryland Defense Force	Maryland Naval Militia (inactive)		Yes		No	
Massachusetts	Ceremonial	Massachusetts State Defense Force	Massachusetts Naval Militia				No	
Massachusetts	Ceremonial	National Lancers					Some	
Michigan	Active	Michigan Defense Force						
Minnesota	Inactive	Minnesota State Guard	Minnesota Naval Militia (inactive)					
Mississippi	Active	Mississippi State Guard					Yes (Simulated only)	
Missouri	Inactive	Missouri State Defense Force	Missouri Naval Militia					
Montana	Not established							
Nebraska	Inactive	Nebraska State Guard						
Nevada	Not established							
New Hampshire	Inactive	New Hampshire State Guard						
New Jersey	Inactive	New Jersey State Guard	New Jersey Naval Militia					
New Mexico	Active	New Mexico State Defense Force						
New York	Active	New York Guard	New York Naval Militia				Yes (Competition only)	
North Carolina	Inactive	North Carolina State Defense Militia	North Carolina Naval Militia					
North Dakota	Not established							
Northern Mariana Islands	Not authorized under Title 32							
Ohio	Active	Ohio Military Reserve	Ohio Naval Militia		Yes		Yes (Honor Guard only)	
Oklahoma	Inactive	Oklahoma State Guard						
Oregon	Active	Oregon Civil Defense Force						
Pennsylvania	Inactive	Pennsylvania State Guard						
Puerto Rico	Active	Puerto Rico State Guard		Yes			Yes	
Rhode Island	Inactive	Rhode Island State Guard	Rhode Island Naval Militia					
Rhode Island	Ceremonial	Rhode Island Independent Military Organizations	Providence naval battalion (inactive)					
South Carolina	Active	South Carolina State Guard	South Carolina Naval Militia				Yes	
South Dakota	Inactive	South Dakota State Guard						
Tennessee	Active	Tennessee State Guard					Yes (Range qualifications for military police units)	
Texas	Active	Texas State Guard		No			Yes (some units)	
US Virgin Islands	Not established							
Utah	Inactive	Utah State Defense Force						
Vermont	Active	Vermont State Guard		Yes			Yes (Competitive only)	
Virginia	Active	Virginia Defense Force	VDF Rivereine Detachment Unit (disbanded)	Inactive	Yes		No	
Washington	Active	Washington State Guard					No	
West Virginia	Not established							
Wisconsin	Inactive	Wisconsin State Defense Force	Wisconsin Naval Militia					
Wyoming	Not established							

- Colorado does not operate an active state defense force, but rather has a statutory state defense force staffed by one individual appointed by the governor.
- The State Reserve Defense Force (also known as 99TH Company- First City Troop- NYC) was its own unique and independent force, and operated as a 501(c)(3) disaster response organization and a 501(c)(19) uniformed veteran service organization until called into service by the state until it was deactivated in 2014. Over its 11 years of active service, the SRDF responded to over 30 disasters/emergencies, served as honor guard/color guard/rifle detail at more than 70 funerals and parades, provided security at more than 150 events, served as security in the aftermath of the WTC attacks, responded to Hurricane Katrina, operated a BID and provided security services to the BID, and operated a year-round 75-bed veterans homeless shelter/veterans service center. The SRDF enjoyed a unique relationship with multiple OEM/law enforcement agencies, college public safety/security departments, and various veteran service and charitable organizations. Members of the SRDF included security officers, doctors and nurses, lawyers, chefs, NYPD Auxiliary Police, Coast Guard Auxiliary, clergy, and many others. The SRDF was headquartered in Fort Hamilton/Bay Ridge Brooklyn. Efforts to reactivate the State Reserve Defense Force are ongoing. Until it is reactivated, the State Reserve Defense Force Association will remain active.
- Pennsylvania currently has an active ceremonial, and charitable organization called the Pennsylvania State Defense Force Association that attends public events in uniform. Its members are all volunteers.
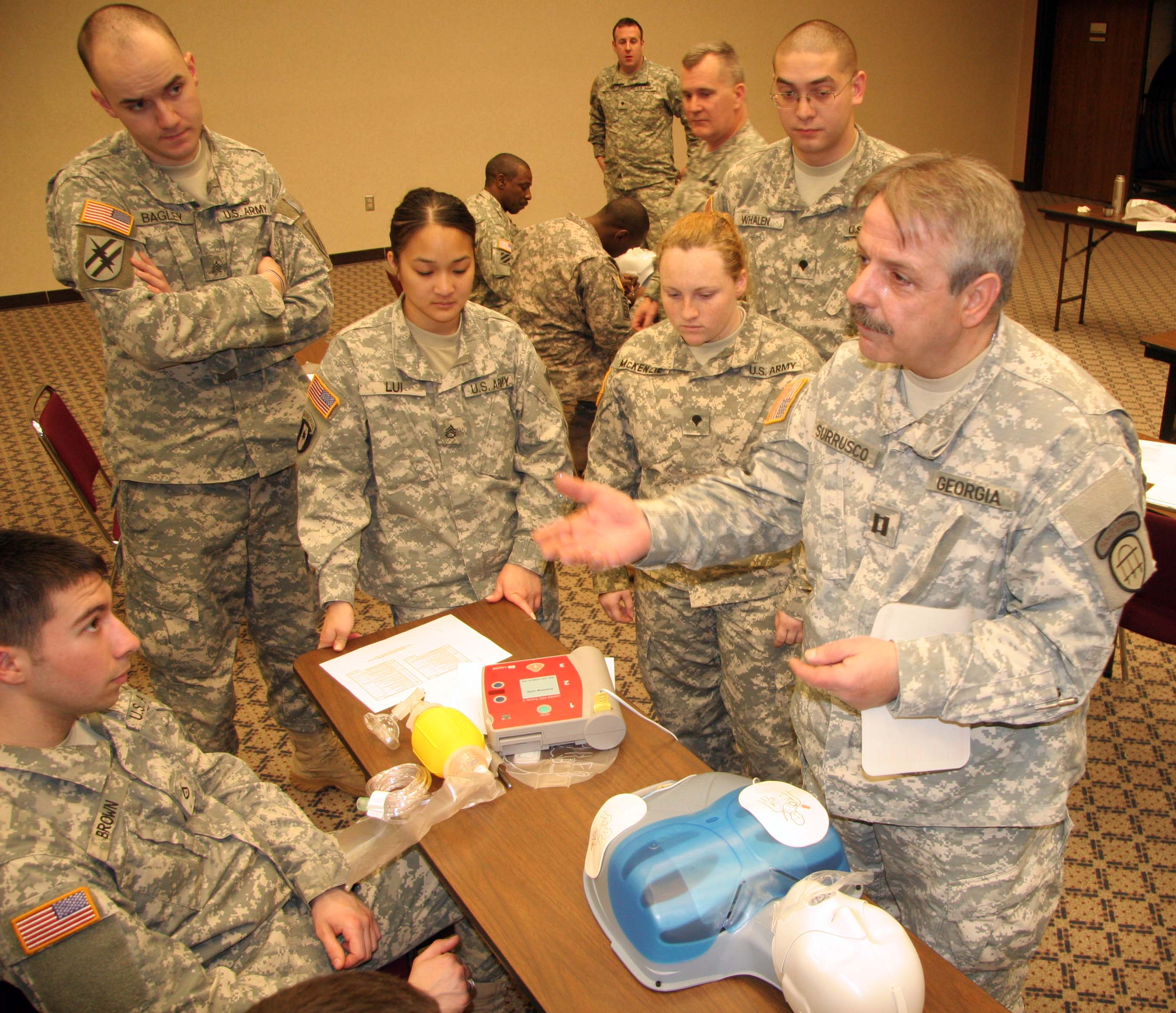
Georgia State Defense Force members help recertify Georgia Army National Guard medics in CPR/AED.

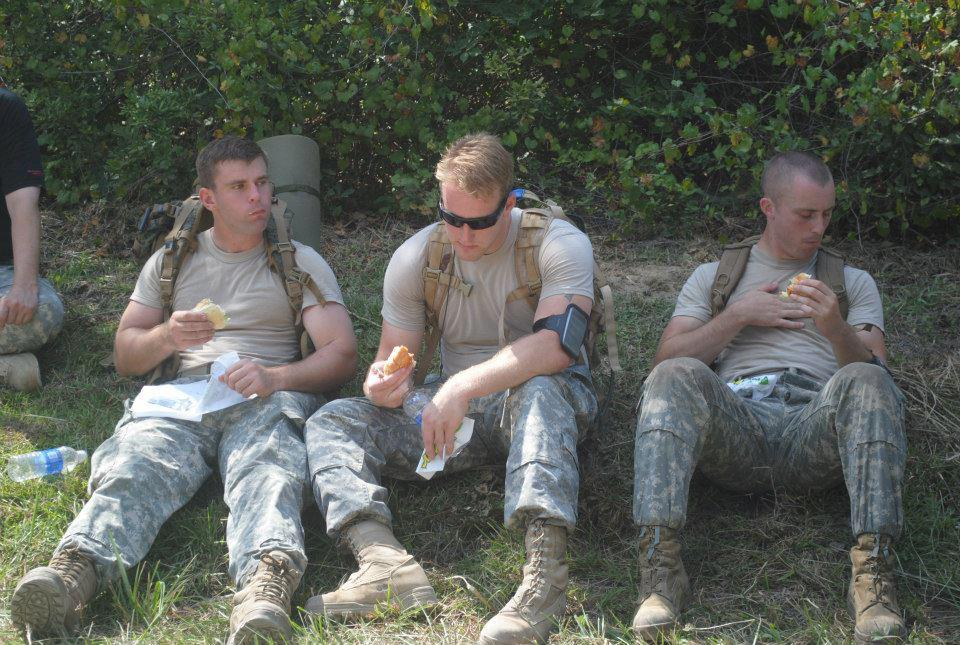
South Carolina State Guard members during pack training.

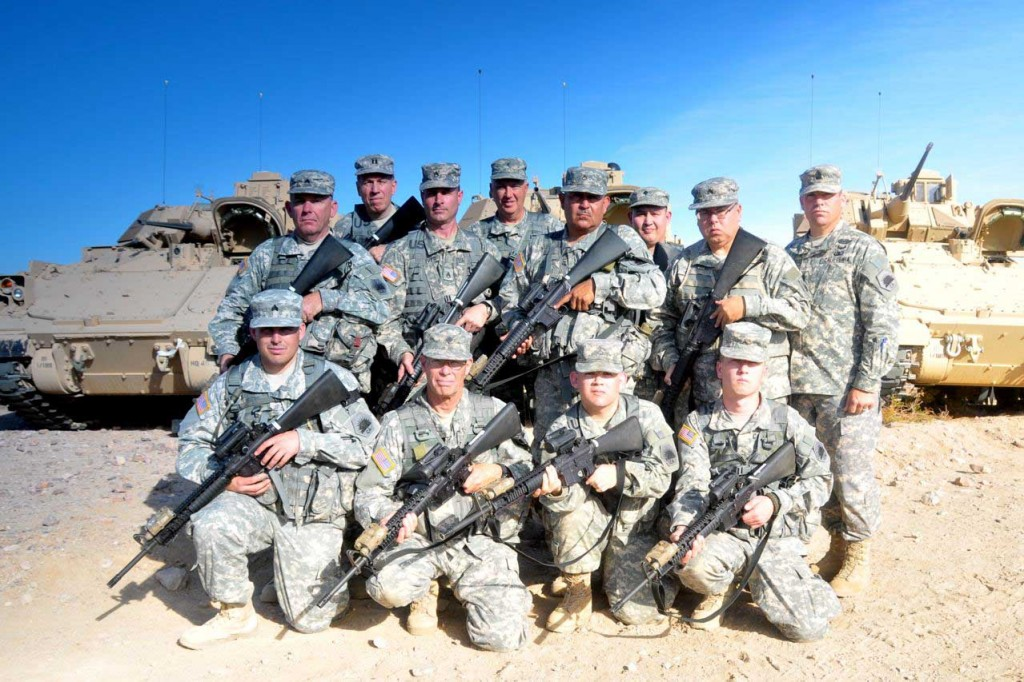
California State Military Reserve troops armed with M16s with 3 Bradleys behind them took a photo while undergo Base Security Training.

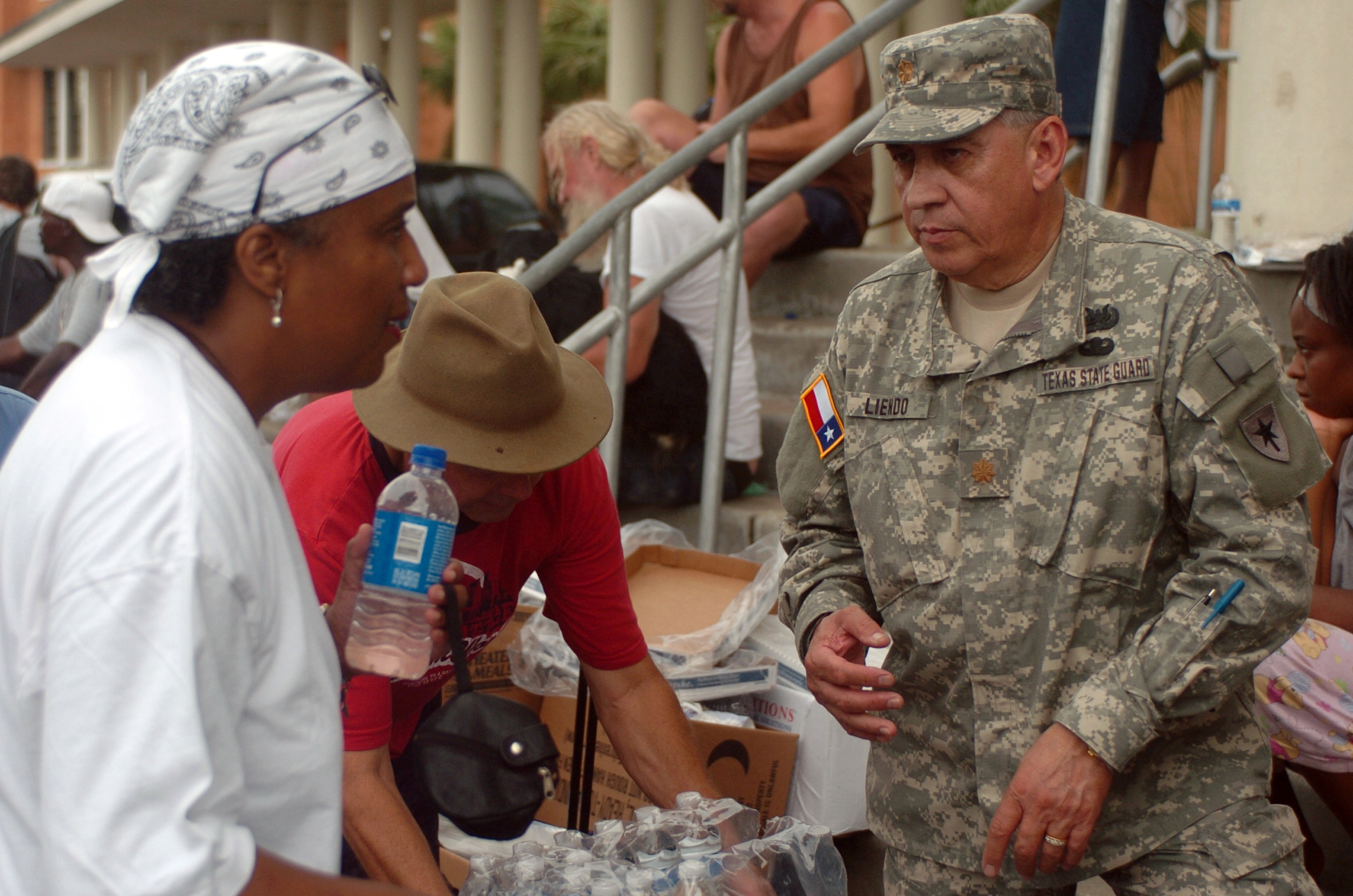
The Texas State Guard Medical Brigade deployed in Galveston, Texas.

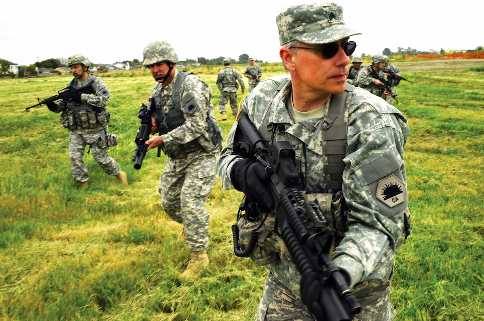
Members of the California State Military Reserve perform squad drills.

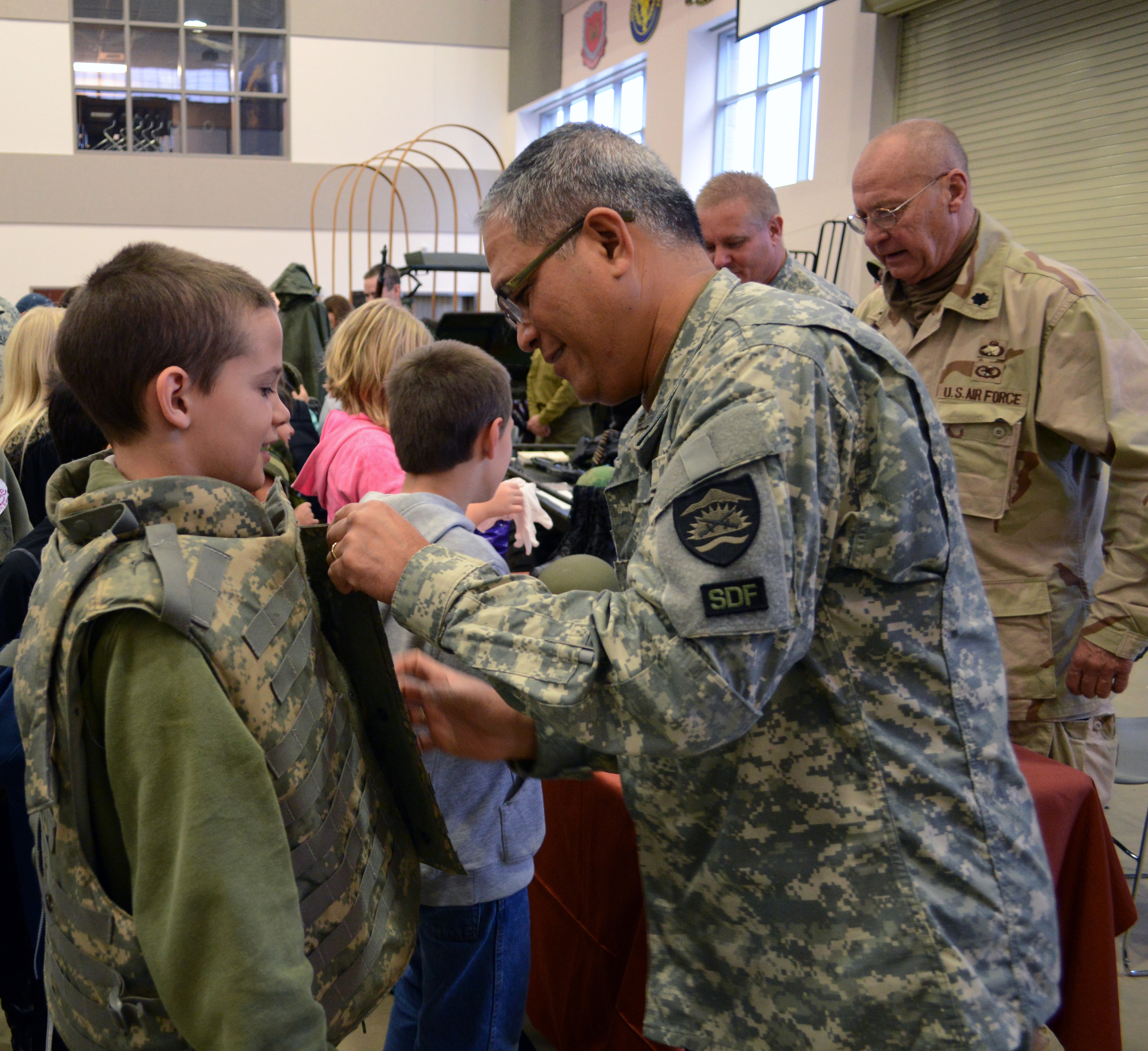
A member of the Oregon State Defense Force helps a child try on body armor.

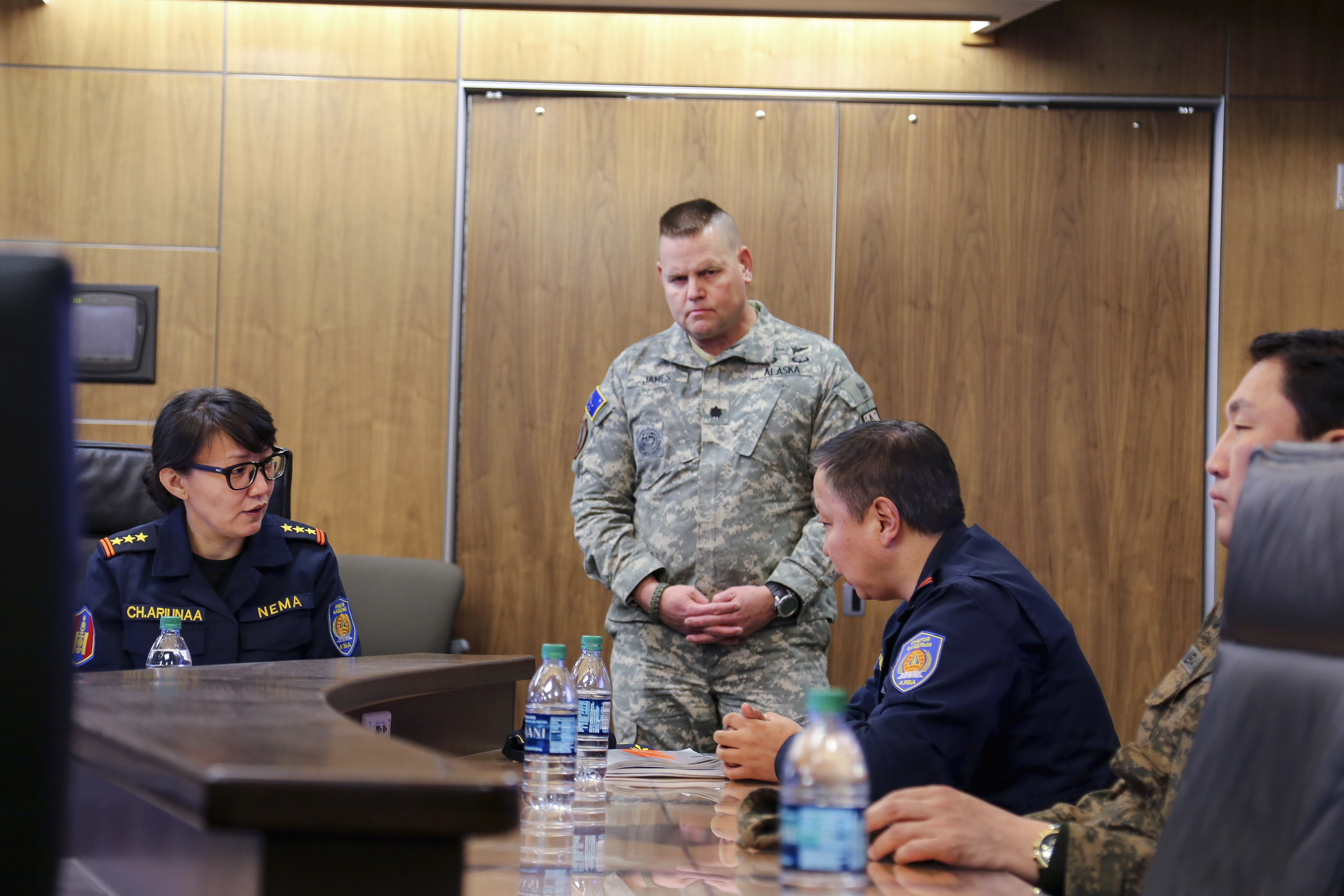
Alaska State Defense Force Lt. Col. (AK) John James speaks with Mongolian emergency personnel.

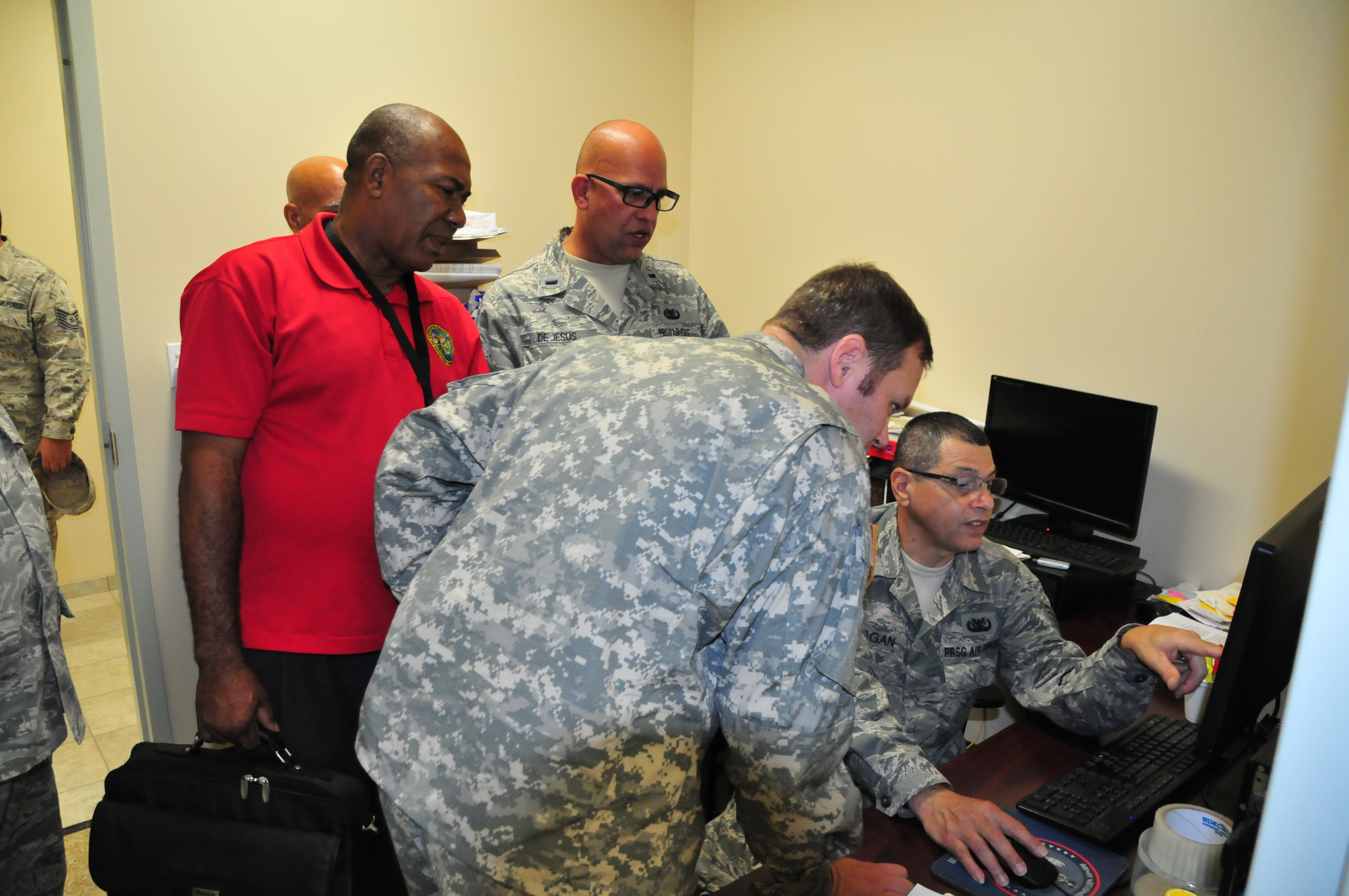
Puerto Rico State Guard members perform inspections of National Guard facilities.

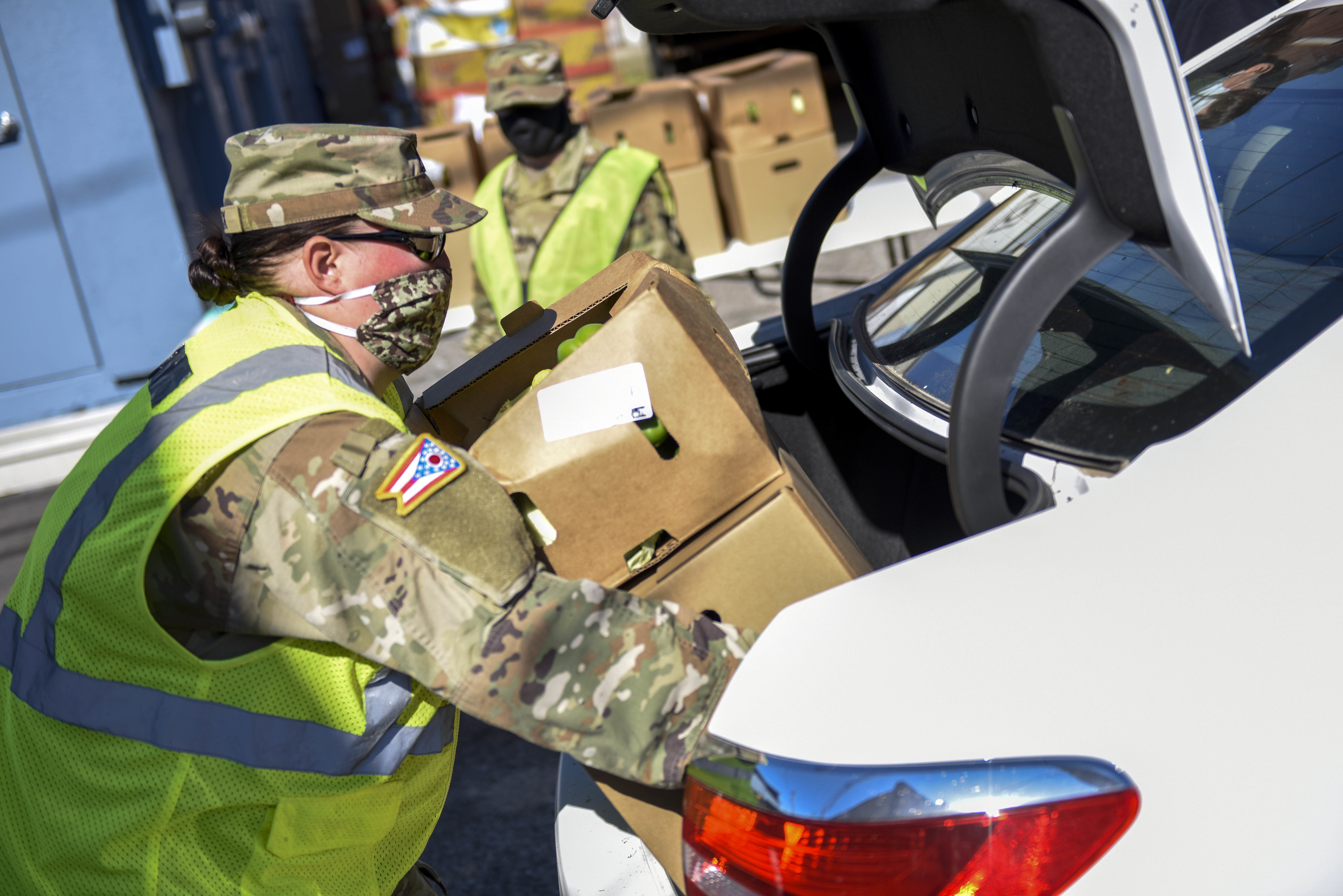
Ohio Military Reserve soldiers load vehicles for Point of Distribution (POD) mission during CoViD-19 pandemic

== Structure ==
=== Personnel and training ===
Some state defense forces advertise recruitment and physical standards lower than the U.S. military with relaxed waiver standards. While other state defense forces, and specific units, advertise professional military and physical fitness standards to retain integration with National Guard counterparts and more physically demanding state and interagency missions.

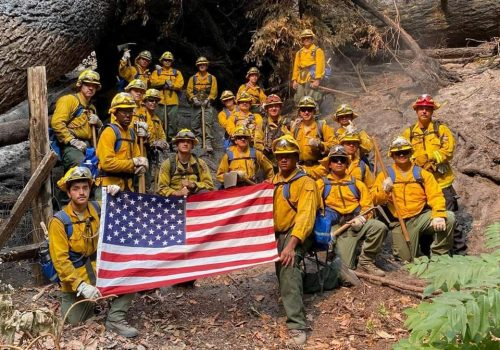
Cal Guard CPT Foster, an officer in California's SDF, the California State Guard, serving as a Fire Team commander leading State and National Guard firefighters in the 2020 California fire season.

California, for instance, requires no physical fitness test prior to entry and has weight/height standards significantly more relaxed than the federal service for certain units, but certain jobs — like firefighters, search and rescue, and certain maritime search and rescue/dive personnel within the Cal Guard's Emergency Response Command and Maritime Service — require passing a physical fitness test, pack hikes, and tryouts. California State Guard wildland firefighters, for example, must complete the National Wildfire Coordinating Group Red Card standards, then complete a Cal Fire interagency training program alongside their National Guard counterparts. Due to the non-combat emergency response mission of the Ohio Military Reserve, a physical fitness test is administered, however, required standards are more closely aligned with the general population than in soldiers preparing for warfare, and age requirements include able-bodied Ohioans aged 17 thru 60 years of age. In the Texas State Guard, there are minimal requirements for general accession, but joining specialized teams like the Dive, Rescue, and Recovery (DR&R) Team requires physical fitness testing and completion of the Texas Dive School.

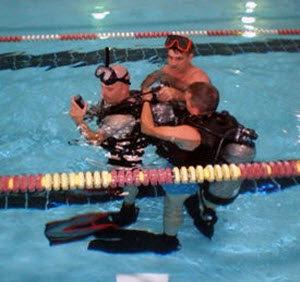
PO1 John Arnn and GySgt Clayton Cormack are adjusting SCPO Gary Wilson's equipment, members of the Texas State Guard Maritime Regiment, Dive, Rescue, & Recovery (DR&R) Team.

Officer Candidate Schools are also maintained by the active State Defense Forces of the United States by direction of their respective state military departments and by the state's National Guard Adjutant General. Similar to their state's National Guard counterparts who take a dual federal and state military commission, military officers who are commissioned through a SDF Officer Candidate School take a sole military commission to the state that they support, recognized by their state's military code and 32 U.S.C. § 109. In states with full integration of state military resources (SDF and National Guard counterparts) the curriculum is often similar, with the National Guard curriculum taking on additional requirements to meet federal recognition (referred to as FEDREC). For example, California maintains both Officer Candidate Schools at Camp San Luis Obispo, with the State Guard OCS being 11–12 months and the National Guard OCS being 16–18 months, both celebrate a joint graduation.. Ohio Military Reserve's Initial Entry Training (IET) as well as NCO and officer schools are conducted by the, separately maintained, Ohio State Defense Force Training Academy (OHSDF-TA)

The Military Emergency Management Specialist Badge, created by the State Guard Association of the United States, has become a common training focal point among state defense forces. Alabama, California, Indiana, Ohio and others have adopted the MEMS Badge as a basic qualification required of all members desiring promotion. Training is conducted both online, and through MEMS academies in each state, and includes course material provided by FEMA and other agencies, as well as practical experience in local disaster planning and exercise management.

Community Emergency Response Teams (CERTs) are being organized by several SDFs by utilizing training offered by the Federal Emergency Management Agency's Citizen Corps. Some states follow the lead of the Army and offer a permanent tab (worn in a similar manner as the Army's Ranger and Sapper tabs) as an incentive to become certified as part of the local or unit CERT team.

State defense forces may incorporate Medical Reserve Corps units into their organizational structure. The 47th Medical Company (MRC), of the New Mexico State Defense Force, the 10th Medical Regiment of the Maryland Defense Force, and the Medical Brigade of the Texas State Guard receive training and recognition from the Medical Reserve Corps program sponsored by the Office of the Surgeon General of the United States through the Citizen Corps program, and are simultaneously organized as units of their respective state defense force.

Weapons qualification and training is provided in some SDFs. However, most SDFs do not require weapons proficiency. A 2006 report by the U.S. Freedom Foundation, an organization affiliated with the State Guard Association of the United States, recommended minimum standards for state defense forces, including weapons training, but the report has been largely ignored. Some SDFs have laws that in the event of deployment by order of the state legislature and/or governor, they will become armed.

=== Uniforms ===
SDF Branch Insignia

As a general rule, state defense forces wear standard U.S. military uniforms with insignia closely matching those of their federal counterparts. SDF units generally wear red name tags on service uniforms (as specifically prescribed by AR 670–1, chapter 2–7, paragraph k and chapter 23–8, paragraph c) for SDF units when adopting the Army Service Uniform or Battle Dress Uniform (BDU), and name tapes on Army Combat Uniforms (ACU) or BDUs use the state defense force name or state name rather than "U.S. Army." Standard U.S. Army branch insignia are often used or a unique "state guard" branch insignia consisting of a crossed musket and sword is alternatively used.

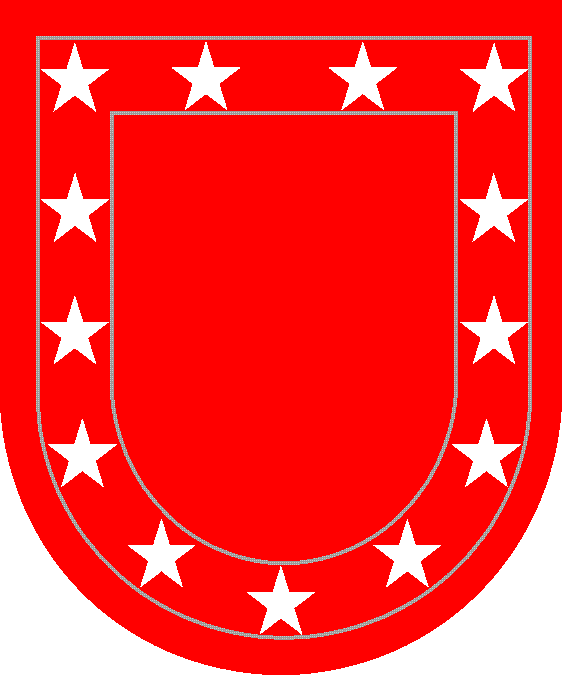
SDF beret flash used by several states.

Where berets are worn, some state defense forces use a beret flash similar to the one the U.S. Army uses, but in bright red thread instead of the Army's blue. Other states have beret flashes that are often based on their state flag.

Uniforms vary from state to state and tend to have only subtle differences. For example, the Texas State Guard wears standard U.S. Army camouflage uniforms, a state guard unit patch, and the "U.S. Army" name tape replaced with one reading "Texas State Guard." Similarly, the California State Guard wears a uniform identical to their National Guard counterparts except for the unit patch, beret flash, and the "California" name tape. Outer garments such as a Gore-Tex jacket have a subdued "CA" beneath the rank insignia. A similar pattern can be found in the New York Guard. The Georgia State Defense Force often works in tandem with and support of federal troops. The Georgia State Defense Force wears the OCP pattern of the ACU with a coyote brown ball cap and a coyote brown pattern "Georgia SDF" in place of the OCP "U.S. Army" uniform name tape.

The few states with both SDF air and naval units wear modified USAF and USN/USMC uniforms. Currently, only Ohio, Alaska and New York have uniformed naval militias. Only California, Vermont, and Puerto Rico have an air wing, though Indiana formerly had an Air Guard Reserve. In all cases, the state adjutant general has the final say on uniforms worn by state defense forces, though federal service regulations generally shape the policies of each state.

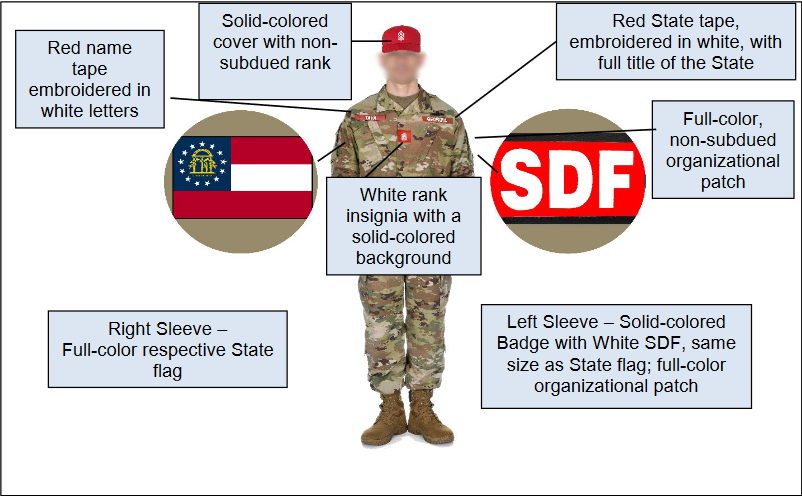
March 2024 changes prescribed by CNGBI 5500.01A.

In March 2024, the Chief of the National Guard Bureau signed an updated Chief of the National Guard Bureau Instruction (CNGBI) 5500.01A National Guard Interaction with State Defense Forces. In this new regulation, it outlined new uniform requirements of SDFs who wear modified US Army Utility Uniforms. These new requirements are the responsibilities of State Adjutant Generals to enforce on their state's SDFs. The new regulations include: solid red background nametapes with white lettering, solid red backgrounds and white ranks for rank tabs, solid red covers with white ranks, the requirement of full color state flags, full color unit patches, and a tab on the left shoulder displaying "SDF" in white lettering on a solid red background. Notably, this regulation also disallowed the display of previously earned qualification badges on the utility uniforms if the badge was issued by the US Armed Forces. For example, if a state SDF member earned a parachutist badge while in the US Armed Forces, they are no longer allowed to display said badge on their SDF uniform. Federal awards not issued by the US Armed Forces are still authorized. This was largely seen by SDF groups, including the State Guard Association of the United States, as an attempt to discredit the legitimacy of SDFs; concerned it would cause confusion among civilians. Proponents argued that it was necessary to ensure there was no confusion between SDFs and the National Guard.

==== State defense force utility uniforms ====
Force	Branch tape reads	Branch, Rank, and Name Tape colors	Insignia (SSI)	Head covering	Uniform type
Alaska State Defense Force	ALASKA	Black on OCP	Subdued	OCP patrol cap	OCP ACU
California State Guard	CALIFORNIA	Silver on Black	Subdued	OCP patrol cap Black beret with royal blue flash with yellow and red slash	OCP ACU
Georgia State Defense Force	GEORGIA SDF	Black on Coyote	Subdued	Solid or mesh coyote ball cap Black beret with red SDF flash (see above)	OCP ACU
Florida State Guard	FL STATE GUARD	Black on UCP	Subdued	UCP patrol cap UCP sun hat (boonie)	UCP ACU
Indiana Guard Reserve	INDIANA	Maroon on OCP	Subdued	Black patrol cap	OCP ACU
Maryland Defense Force	MARYLAND	Maroon on OCP	Subdued	OCP ball cap Black beret with black and yellow divided flash with white and red slashes	OCP ACU
Massachusetts National Lancers	MASSACHUSETTS	Black on OCP	Unsubdued	OCP patrol cap Pith Helmet	OCP ACU Class A and B, and ceremonial lancer uniform.
Michigan Defense Force	MICHIGAN	Black on OCP	Subdued	OCP patrol cap	OCP ACU
Mississippi State Guard	MS STATE GUARD	Crimson on OCP	Subdued	OCP patrol cap Black beret with red SDF flash (see above)	OCP ACU
New York Guard	N.Y. GUARD	Silver on Black	Subdued	Black patrol cap Black beret with gray flash (Dress Blues Only)	OCP ACU
New York Naval Militia	N.Y. NAVAL MILITIA	Yellow on NWU; Black on MARPAT; White on blue	Yellow on NWU; Black on MARPAT; White on blue	Naval style 8-point cover Marine style 8-point cover baseball cap	NWU/MARPAT/ODU
Ohio Military Reserve	OHIO	OCP rank, White text on red name tape	Unsubdued	OD patrol cap, bright rank insignia	OCP ACU
Ohio Naval Militia	OHIO NAVY	Gold/silver on navy blue	Gold/silver on navy blue (E-4 & up)	Naval style 8-point cover	NWU
Oregon Civil Defense Force	OREGON	Black on UCP	Subdued	UCP patrol cap	UCP ACU
Puerto Rico State Guard	PRSG ARMY; PRSG AIR FORCE	Black on OCP	Subdued	OCP patrol cap Black beret with yellow & red flash reminiscent of Spanish heraldry	OCP ACU
South Carolina State Guard	S.C. STATE GUARD	Gray on Black	Subdued	OCP patrol cap	OCP ACU
Tennessee State Guard	TN STATE GUARD	Maroon on UCP	Unsubdued	UCP patrol cap	UCP ACU
Texas State Guard	TEXAS STATE GUARD	Black on OCP	Subdued	OCP patrol cap Black beret with red, white, and blue beret flash	OCP ACU
Vermont State Guard	VT STATE GUARD	Black on OCP	Unsubdued	OCP patrol cap	OCP ACU
Virginia Defense Force	VIRGINIA	White on Maroon	Unsubdued	OD ball cap	OCP ACU
Washington State Guard	WA STATE GUARD	Black on OCP	Subdued	OCP patrol cap Black beret with yellow, green, and white beret flash	OCP ACU

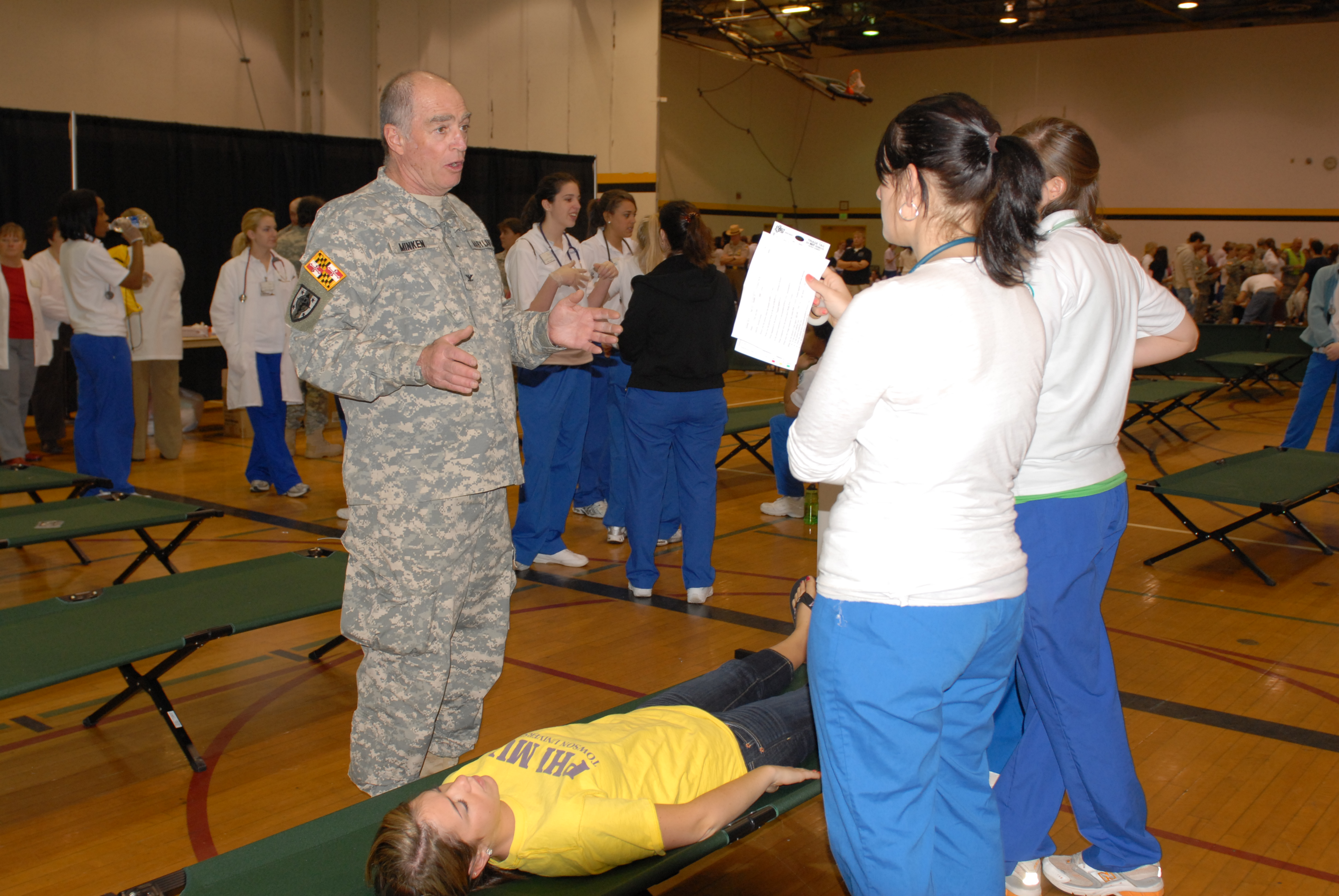
Maryland Defense Forces and Maryland Army National Guard participate in a multi-agency disaster exercise at Towson University.

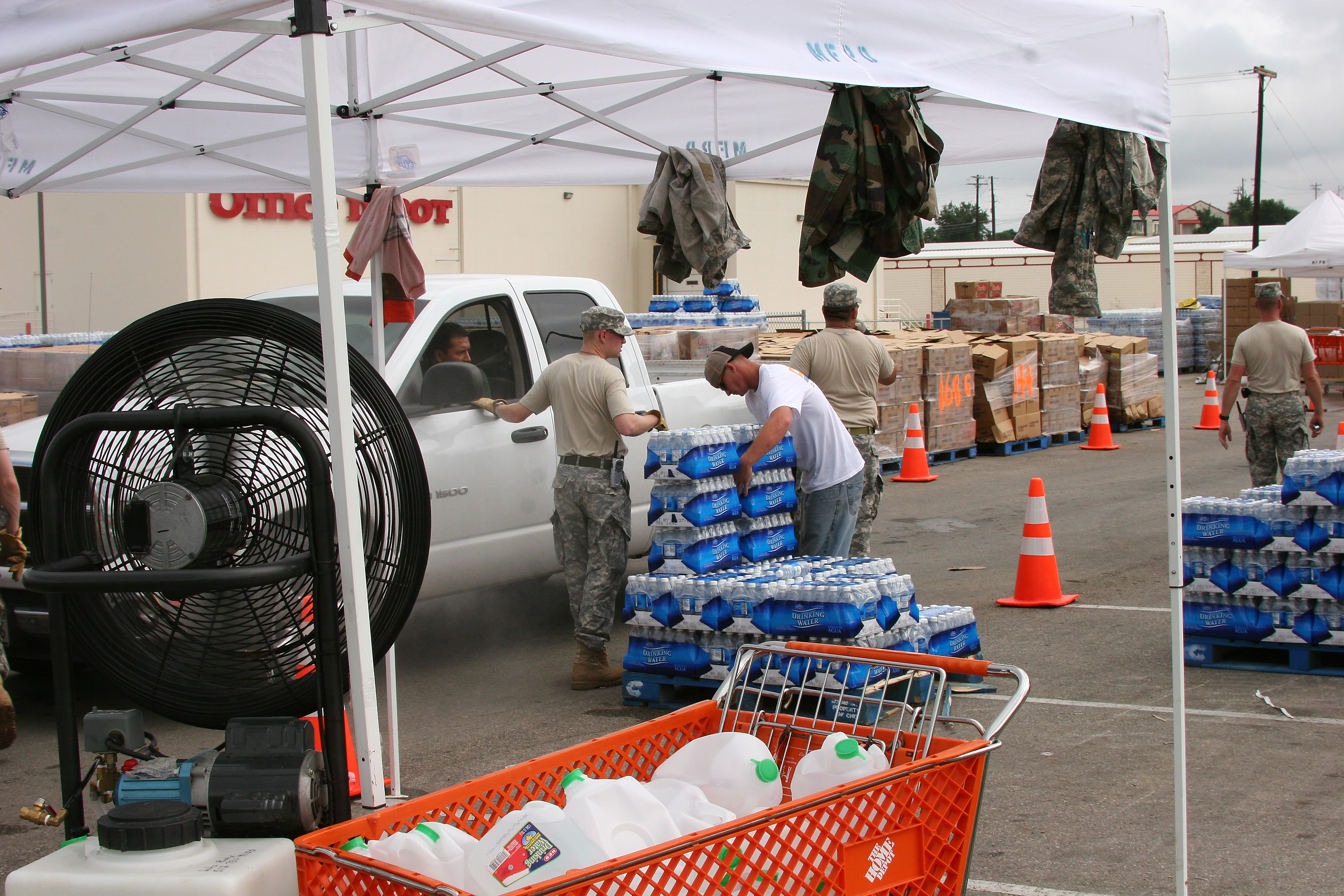
Texas State Guardsmen pass out free water after flooding contaminated a local water supply.

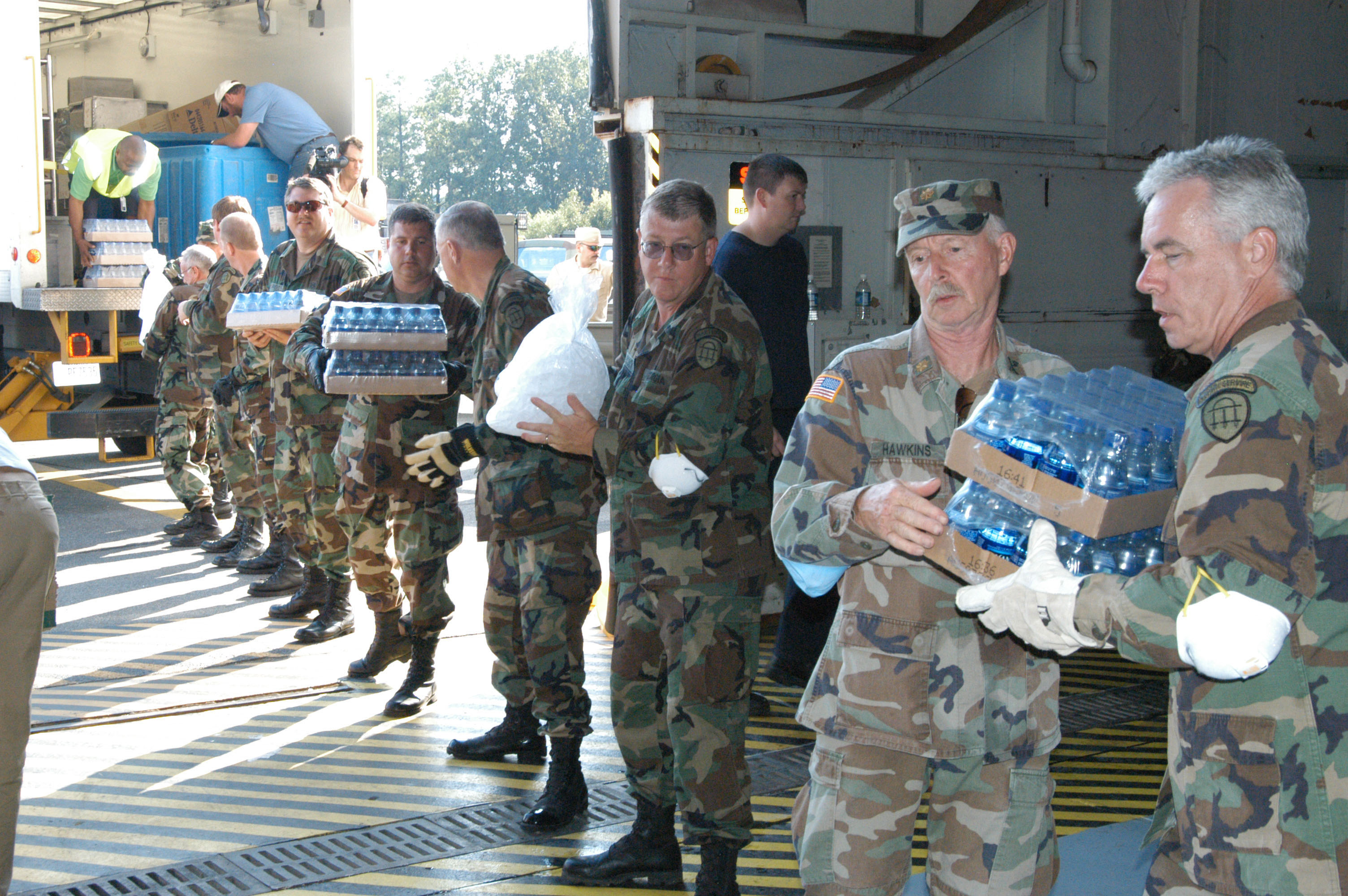
Georgia Defense Force members unload water and ice in anticipation of incoming Hurricane Katrina evacuees.

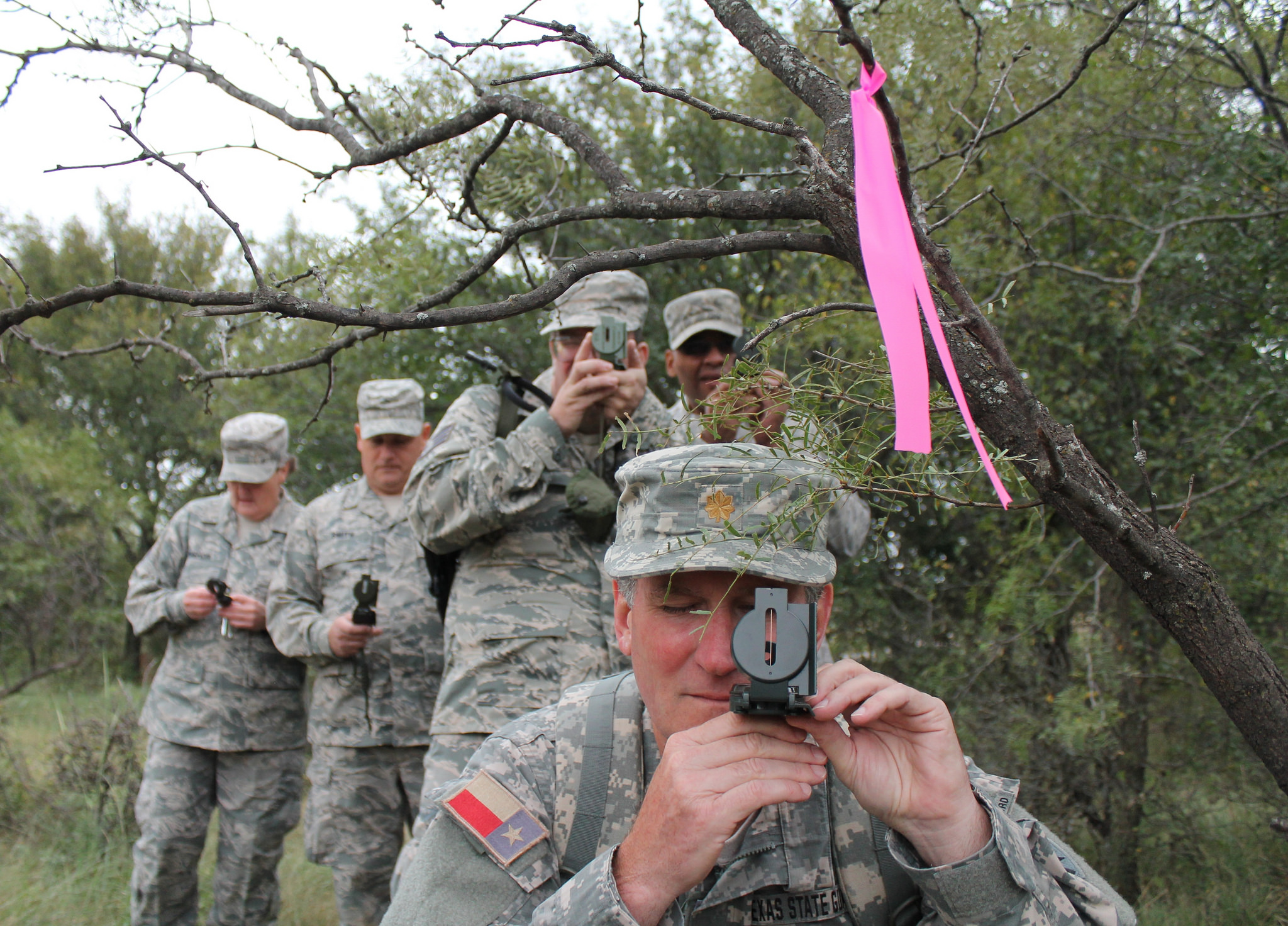
Texas State Guard during a Land Navigation joint training exercise.

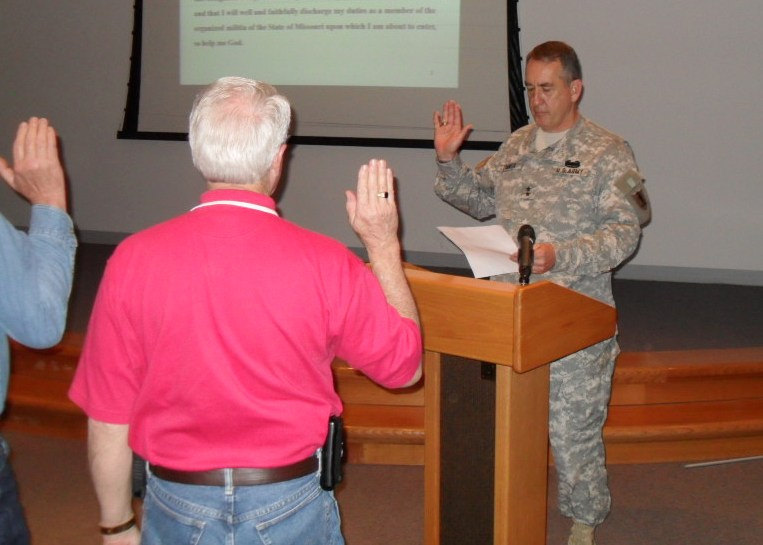
Missouri State Defense Force swearing in ceremony.

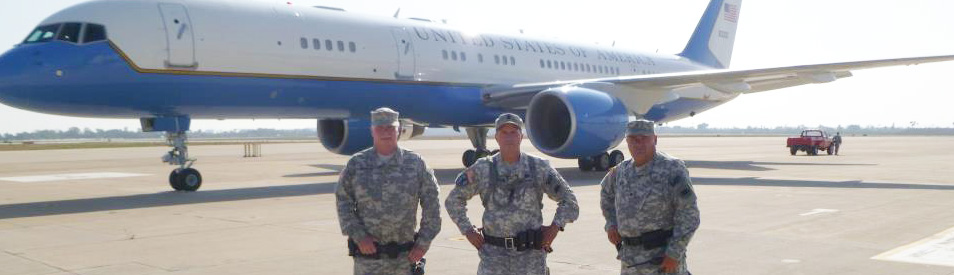
California State Military Reserve guardsmen provide security for Air Force Two.

== Special units ==
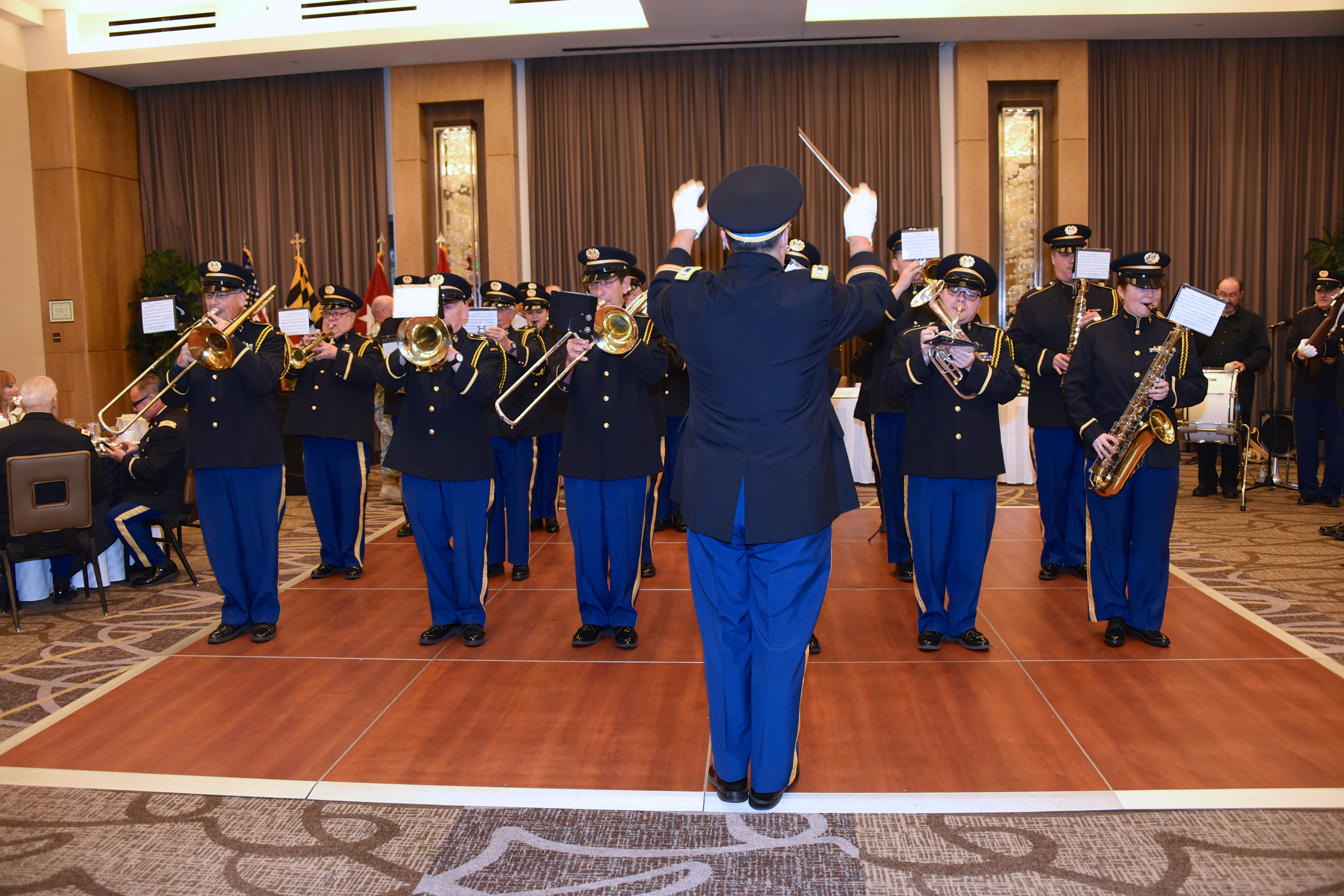
The Maryland Defense Force Band playing at a state defense force conference in 2015.

SDFs include a variety of special units including medical, aviation, and ceremonial units. The following are examples:

- Troop A, Massachusetts National Lancers (mounted ceremonial unit).
- Troop D, Massachusetts National Lancers (caisson team and military honor guard)
- 7th Unmanned Aerial System (UAS) detachment of the Ohio Military Reserve specializes in aerial (drone) reconnaissance for state emergencies, including flood as well as search and rescue support.
- Cyber Security Command, Maryland Defense Force
- Cavalry Troop A, Maryland Defense Force
- 121st Engineer Regiment, Maryland Defense Force
- 10th Medical Regiment, Maryland Defense Force
- 61st Medical Company, Tennessee State Guard
- Finance Corps, Maryland Defense Force
- Judge Advocate Corps, Maryland Defense Force
- Georgia Defense Force Band, Georgia State Defense Force
- Maryland Defense Force Band
- Governor's Foot Guard, Governor's Horse Guard & Band, Connecticut State Militia
- 1st Medical Company, Georgia State Defense Force
  - 1st Platoon – DECON/CBRN-e
- Quick Reaction Teams (QRT) (now disbanded) – Small units attached to a number of Texas State Guard Civil Affairs (CA) regiments. QRT undergo specialized training and qualify with approved NATO 9mm sidearm. QRT compete in the Governor's Twenty competition with the Texas Army National Guard and Texas Air National Guard.
- Special Missions Unit: Florida State Guard. Trained for military policing, responses, and special forces missions. The unit is armed with rifles and pistols.
- 3rd Medical detachment, Ohio Military Reserve consists of trained doctors, nurses and emergency medical personnel
- Aviation Response Squadron: Florida State Guard. Aviation force with intelligence, recon, fire, medical, and disaster response duties.
- Small Arms Training Team – Small arms and crew served weapons team of the California State Military Reserve
- Search and Rescue Company, Puerto Rico State Guard
- The 1st Air Base Group, Puerto Rico Air State Guard
- The Georgia State Defense Force OPFOR unit
- RAIDER School, South Carolina State Guard
- 143rd CSMR Support Battalion, State MP Unit, California State Military Reserve.
- The Ohio Cyber Reserve, a dedicated cyberspace component of the Ohio SDF
- 31st Cyber Regiment, Virginia Defense Force, trained to defend the Commonwealth's Cyber Infrastructure.

== Federal activation ==
The U.S. Constitution, coupled with several statutes and cases, details the relationship of state defense forces to the federal government. Outside of 32 U.S.C. 109, the U.S. Supreme Court noted: "It is true that the state defense forces 'may not be called, ordered, or drafted into the armed forces.' 32 U.S.C. 109(c). It is nonetheless possible that they are subject to call under 10 U.S.C. 331–333, which distinguish the 'militia' from the 'armed forces,' and which appear to subject all portions of the 'militia' – organized or not – to call if needed for the purposes specified in the Militia Clauses" (Perpich v. Department of Defense, 496 U.S. 334 (1990)).^{a} The Court, however, explicitly noted that it was not deciding this issue. The following is an extract of the laws which the Court cited as possibly giving the federal government authority to activate the state defense forces:

10 U.S.C. 251 – "Federal aid for State governments"

Whenever there is an insurrection in any State against its government, the President may, upon the request of its legislature or of its governor if the legislature cannot be convened, call into Federal service such of the militia of the other States, in the number requested by that State, and use such of the armed forces, as he considers necessary to suppress the insurrection.

10 U.S.C. 252 – "Use of militia and armed forces to enforce Federal authority"

Whenever the President considers that unlawful obstructions, combinations, or assemblages, or rebellion against the authority of the United States, make it impracticable to enforce the laws of the United States in any State or Territory by the ordinary course of judicial proceedings, he may call into Federal service such of the militia of any State, and use such of the armed forces, as he considers necessary to enforce those laws or to suppress the rebellion.

10 U.S.C. 253 – "Interference with State and Federal law"

The President, by using the militia or the armed forces, or both, or by any other means, shall take such measures as he considers necessary to suppress, in a State, any insurrection, domestic violence, unlawful combination, or conspiracy, if it -

(1) so hinders the execution of the laws of that State, and of the United States within the State, that any part or class of its people is deprived of a right, privilege, immunity, or protection named in the Constitution and secured by law, and the constituted authorities of that State are unable, fail, or refuse to protect that right, privilege, or immunity, or to give that protection; or

(2) opposes or obstructs the execution of the laws of the United States or impedes the course of justice under those laws.

In any situation covered by clause (1), the State shall be considered to have denied the equal protection of the laws secured by the Constitution.

== State defense force reactivation efforts ==
A number of legislators have spearheaded attempts to reactivate the state defense forces of their states. In 2011, a bill was introduced in the New Hampshire General Court which, if passed, would permanently reestablish the New Hampshire State Guard. The bill did not pass. The same year, Governor Jan Brewer signed a bill which authorized the organization of a state defense force in Arizona.

In 2018, Kansas state senator Dennis Pyle petitioned the Governor of Kansas to reactivate the Kansas State Guard, in part to offer an additional security resource for schools.

In 2019, Pennsylvania state representative Chris Rabb proposed legislation which would reactivate and modernize the Pennsylvania State Guard in order to "address the epidemic of gun violence, domestic terrorism, and other inter-related public health crises".

In December 2021, Florida governor Ron DeSantis announced plans to reestablish the Florida State Guard as a 200-person volunteer force that would act independently of the federal government in disaster relief efforts. The reactivated Florida State Guard was announced in June 2022.

In January 2022, Oklahoma state senator Nathan Dahm introduced legislation to reactivate the Oklahoma State Guard. The bill failed in the Republican-led Oklahoma Senate Veterans Committee in February 2022.

In February 2024, Arizona state representative Joseph Chaplik introduced Arizona House Concurrent Resolution 2059 to establish the Arizona State Guard. The Resolution notably includes granting the Arizona State Guard the authority to make arrests and enforce laws. That same month, multiple West Virginia State Delegates introduced West Virginia House Bill 5525, or the West Virginia State Guard Act. This bill would direct the governor of West Virginia to establish and maintain a State Defense Force for West Virginia. Prior to this, a West Virginia State Guard was authorized for creation by the governor, but this Act would direct the governor to create one. This bill notably includes several tax and education benefits for a service commitment.

In 2025, Governor Kevin Stitt announced his desire to reestablish the Oklahoma State Guard.

In 2025, Wyoming state senator Dan Laursen introduced a bill into the Wyoming Legislature to introduce the Wyoming State Guard. In 2026, Governor Mark Gordon signed a bill which provided funding for the establishment of a Wyoming state guard.

In 2026, a bill was introduced in the West Virginia Legislature which would create a state defense force in West Virginia.

== Notable members ==
- Radio host Clark Howard retired from the Georgia State Defense Force after more than 20 years of service.
- Former New York state Republican Party chairman Joseph Mondello was a member of the New York Guard.
- David P. Weber, former Assistant Inspector General of the U.S. Securities and Exchange Commission and whistleblower, is a Lieutenant Colonel JAG officer in the Maryland Defense Force, attached to the Maryland Army National Guard.
- Lauren Guzman, who was crowned Miss Texas USA in 2014, is a member of the Texas State Guard.
- Cooper Hefner, Son of Hugh Hefner, was a member of the California State Guard.
- Alvin C. York, one of the most decorated United States Army soldiers of World War I, served in the Tennessee State Guard.
- Former Heavyweight champion boxer Lt. Jack Dempsey served in the New York Guard.

== See also ==
- Awards and decorations of the State Defense Forces
- Civil Air Patrol
- Militia (United States)
- Naval militias in the United States
- Paramilitary
- Militarization of police
- State Guard Association of the United States
- United States Coast Guard Auxiliary
- United States Guards

== Notes ==
a.Pub. L. 114–328 renumbered 10 U.S.C. 331-333 as 10 U.S.C. 251-253
