= Maryland Defense Force =

- Distinctive unit insignia
- Active: 1917–1920; 1941–1947; 1983–present
- Country: United States
- Allegiance: Maryland
- Type: State defense force
- Part of: Maryland Military Department
- Headquarters: Reisterstown, Maryland
- Motto: Officio Vocante Parati (Ready When Called)
- Website: military.maryland.gov/mddf/

Commanders
- Governor of the State of Maryland: Governor Wes Moore
- Adjutant General of the State of Maryland: Major General Janeen L. Birckhead
- Commanding General, Maryland Defense Force: Brigadier General (MDDF) Gregory Juday

Insignia
- Beret flash of the Maryland Defense Force

The Maryland Defense Force (MDDF) is the state defense force for the state of Maryland. The MDDF is organized as a state military reserve organization organized parallel to the Maryland National Guard and is designed to augment the National Guard during stateside emergencies. However, as a state defense force, the MDDF is solely under control of the State of Maryland and cannot be federalized or deployed outside the borders of Maryland.

== History ==
=== 20th century ===
The roots of the MDDF date back to colonial days in the 17th century, but it was formally established in 1917 with the mission "to protect public buildings, water supplies, and other properties". It was called the Maryland State Guard. It was disbanded in 1920 to make room for the National Guard to return to duties in the armories.

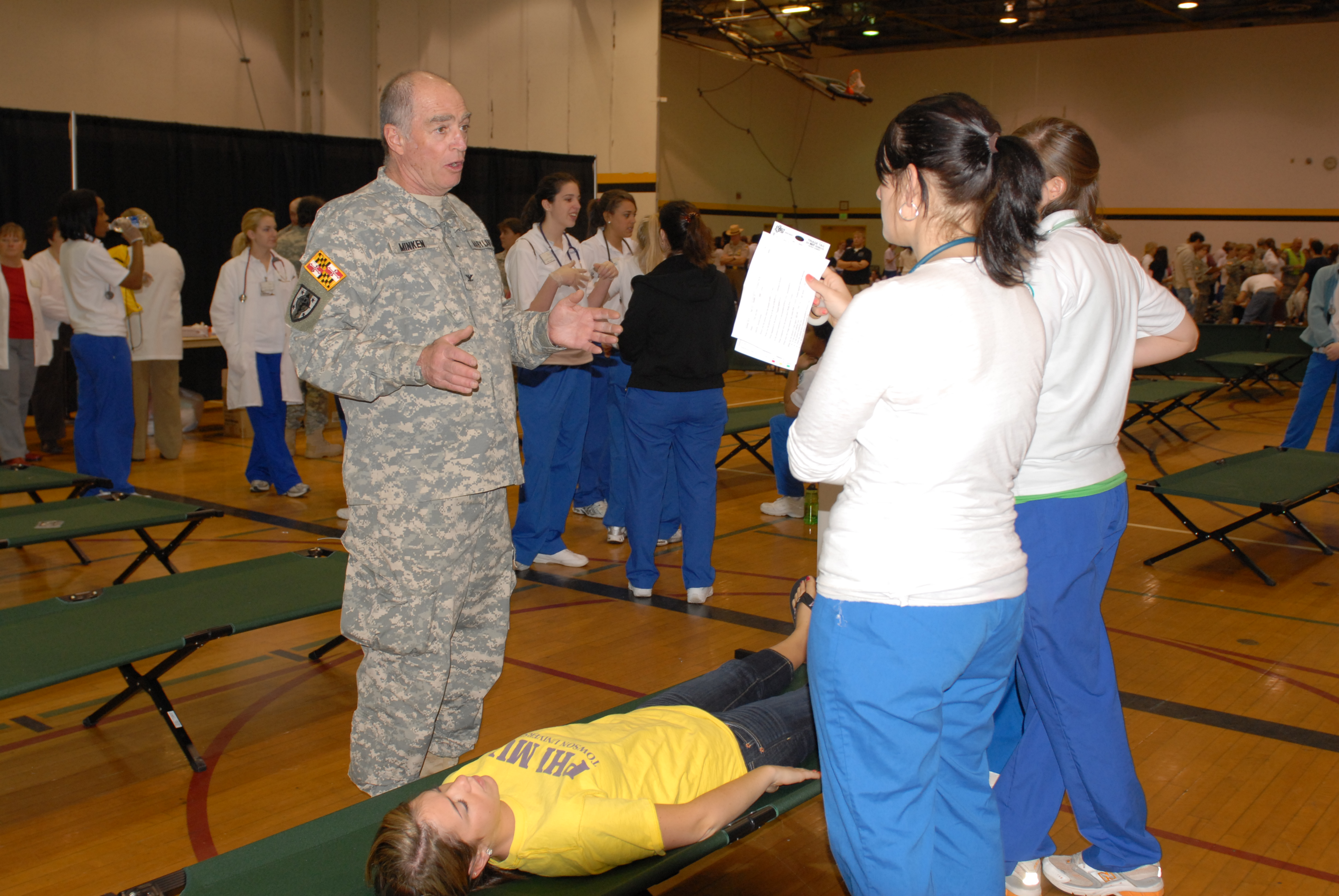
Maryland Defense Forces and Maryland Army National Guard participate in a multi-agency disaster exercise at Towson University.

The Maryland State Guard was reactivated in 1939 in response to World War II. It was then deactivated in 1947. As of 1983, the Maryland State Guard was reactivated and renamed the Maryland Defense Force. In 1994, the Maryland Defense Force's missions were expanded to search and rescue, armory staffing, and disaster relief. As of September 11, 2001, the Maryland Defense Force was tasked with its current mission, which is to provide support to the Maryland Military Department as needed.

=== 21st century ===
In August 2005, members of the 10th Medical Regiment, including civilian medical professionals who were sworn into the MDDF on the tarmac of Martin State Airport, departed for Louisiana in two C130 cargo planes operated by the Maryland Air National Guard to provide medical treatment to approximately 6,300 hurricane victims over eighteen days as an operation called Operation Lifeline.

In 2006, members of the 10th Medical Regiment, despite not being subject to deployment outside the State of Maryland, voluntarily deployed with the 175th Medical Group of the Maryland Air National Guard to Bosnia and Herzegovina as a part of a training exercise where the 10th Medical Regiment assisted in providing medical aid to the local populace.

In September 2007, the MDDF participated with the National Guard for Exercise Vigilant Guard, a major homeland security/terrorist response exercise held in Maryland, Virginia, and Washington, DC.

In June 2012, the MDDF provided food and water to residents of Baltimore during the heat emergency.

During the 2015 Baltimore riots, members of the Maryland Defense Force, including members of the 10th Medical Brigade as well as logistical support personnel and military chaplains, deployed alongside the Maryland Army National Guard in support of their mission.

== Legal protection ==
The Code of Maryland guarantees that members of the Maryland Defense Force who are called to active duty or training are entitled to a leave of absence, and full reemployment rights after their deployment ends. This is only for Maryland State employees. Members of MDDF are also covered by Maryland workers compensation where actively deployed by the Maryland Governor.

== Units ==
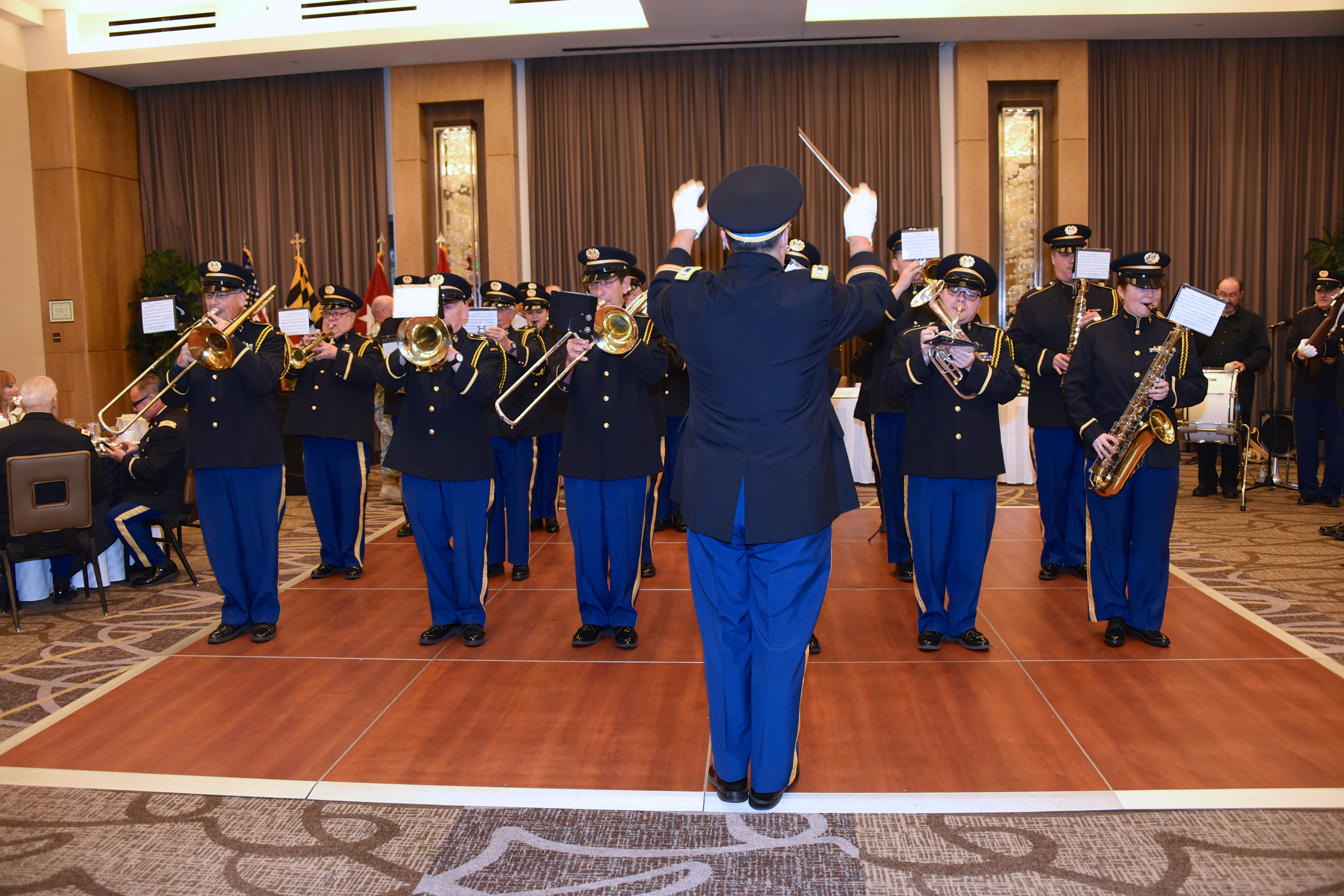
The Maryland Defense Force Band plays at the State Defense Force conference in October 2015.

=== Maryland Defense Force Band ===
The Maryland Defense Force Band provides back up support for the 229th Army Band of the Maryland Army National Guard. The MDDF band plays in military ceremonies, concerts, and receptions organized by the Maryland Military Department. The band includes wind, brass, and percussion instruments.

=== Cavalry Troop A ===
Cavalry Troop A, the ceremonial cavalry unit of the Maryland Military Department, was established January 8, 2004. The troop acts in a ceremonial and public relations role as a recruiting aid for both the MDDF and the Maryland National Guard. Training for Troop A includes mounted cavalry drill, equitation or skill-at-arms on horseback or dismounted drill and ceremony and basic military customs and courtesies. This unit was deactivated, but as of 2023, has been reactivated.

=== Chaplain Corps ===
The MDDF Chaplain Corps includes ordained ministers, staff assistants, and chaplain assistants who provide spiritual support for members of the MDDF, the Maryland National Guard, their families, and in times of emergency, civilians. The Chaplain Corps can be called upon to perform religious rites or sacraments when deployed. Chaplains are required be ordained ministers of their faith, in good standing with their church, and must meet secondary education requirements. On top of certification requirements, chaplains must have passed MDDF Basic Training and courses in MDDF-specific Chaplain duties.

=== 256th Cyber Defense Unit ===
The 256th Cyber Defense Unit (CDU) was created in 2010 to supplement the cyber teams of the Maryland National Guard. Its mission statement includes providing support to the Maryland Military Department, improving the security stance of the State of Maryland agencies and being prepared to respond with the Maryland Military Department in case of a cyber emergency. In order to complete this mission, the MDDF Cyber Security Unit regularly trains with the Maryland Army & Air National Guard. In addition, they participate in numerous joint training exercises with members of the Maryland Air National Guard, Maryland Army National Guard and various state agencies.
The 256th CDU consists of five sections: Headquarters, Hunt Operations, Incident Response and Recovery (IRR), Vulnerability Assessment and Penetration Testing (VAPT) & IT Operations

=== 121st Engineer Regiment ===
The 121st Engineer Regiment acts as a rapid relief engineering unit intended to deploy after an emergency to aid the Maryland Military Department in civil relief efforts. Since 2009, the 121st Engineer Regiment has conducted all of the inspections of state military facilities across Maryland for the Maryland Army National Guard.

==== Maryland Emergency Engineering Response Team (MEERT) ====
The Maryland Emergency Engineering Response Team is a unit of graduate engineers, most of whom are licensed professional Maryland engineers, organized to work closely with both the Maryland Army National Guard and the Maryland Department of Emergency Management (MDEM).

=== Finance Corps ===
The Finance Corps of the MDDF is composed of licensed financial consultants, advisers, and civilian energy managers. The mission of the Finance Corps is to provide the following:

- Emergency Financial & Administrative surge capacity support to military and civil authorities during field training exercises and emergency missions.
- Financial analysis, accounting, management, and forecasting for MDDF assets
- Practical financial briefs to Maryland National Guardsmen and their families at group program events – Yellow Ribbon, Soldier Readiness, Recruit Sustainment, and Retirement
- Energy analysis, accounting, management, and forecasting with the Installation Status Report (ISR), a decision support tool for garrison commanders and military facility managers.

=== Judge Advocate Corps ===
The Judge Advocate Corps (JAC) of the MDDF is composed of licensed attorneys.

=== 10th Medical Regiment ===
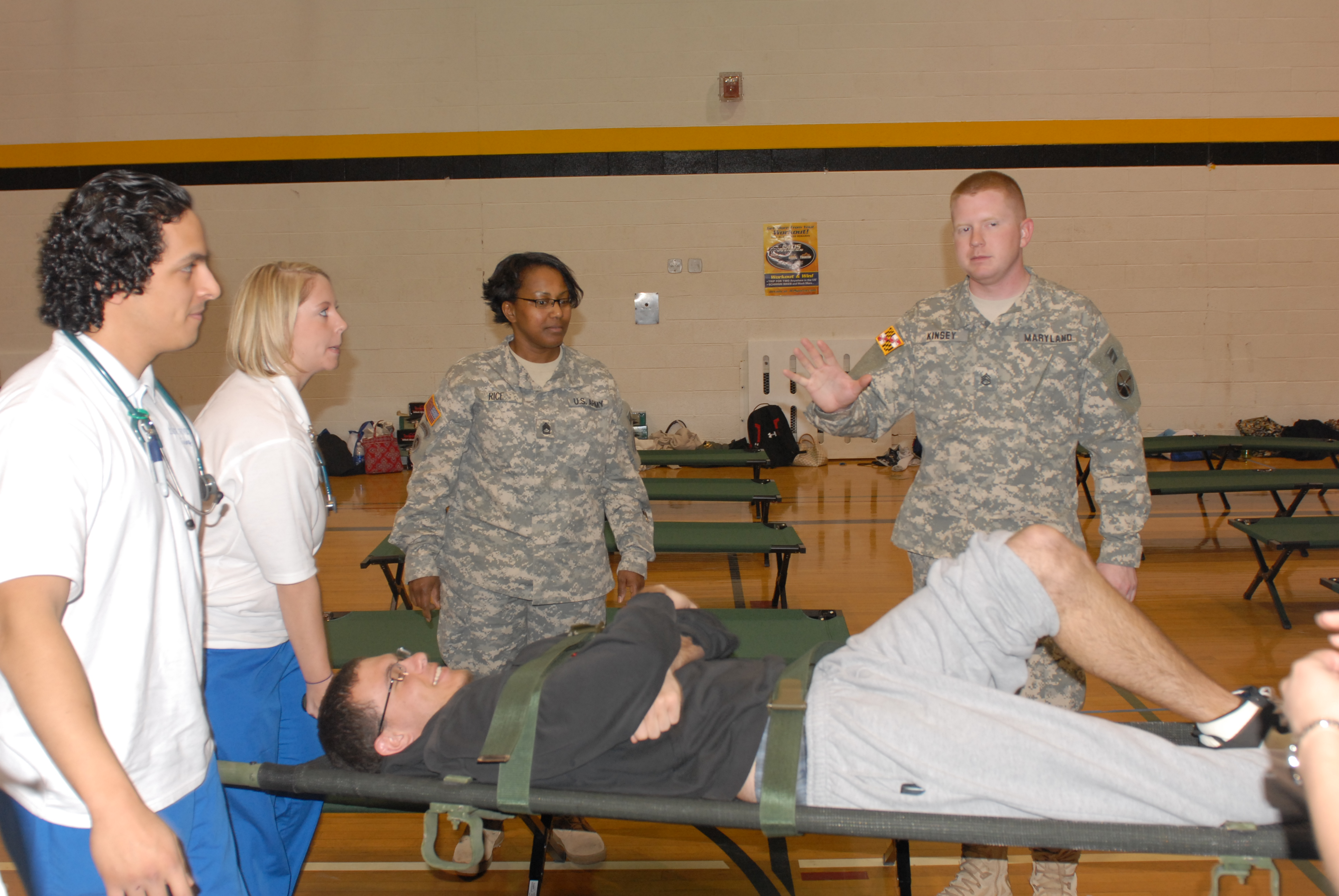
A Maryland National Guardsman and a Maryland State Guardsman teach nursing students proper evacuation procedures at Towson University.

The 10th Medical Regiment is the medical arm of the MDDF and is registered with the Office of the Surgeon General as a Medical Reserve Corps unit. The mission of the regiment is to provide emergency surge capacity support to civil authorities during an emergency. Unlike other MDDF guardsmen, members of the 10th Medical Regiment are allowed to serve in backup status and attend only an annual muster one day per year.

In August 2005, on a purely voluntary basis as state guardsmen cannot be ordered to deploy outside the state of Maryland, members of the 10th Medical Regiment provided medical service to approximately 6,300 Hurricane Katrina victims over an eighteen-day period as a part of Operation Lifeline. Included in those deployed were civilian medical professionals who, despite a willingness to volunteer in providing medical care for hurricane victims, had no means of deployment into the emergency zone as civilians. These medical volunteers were inducted into the MDDF on the tarmac of Martin State Airport. As members of the MDDF, these volunteers received military transport, worker's compensation eligibility, and liability protection under Maryland law. Over 100 of those sworn in with the purpose of taking part in Operation Lifeline elected to remain members of the MDDF following deployment. Operation Lifeline, with only 250 MDDF volunteers lasted for 18 days and aided 6,300 patients.

In 2006, volunteers from the 10th Medical Regiment deployed to Bosnia and Herzegovina alongside the 175th Medical Group of the Air National Guard to provide medical care for locals as a part of a training mission.

=== Pioneer Detachment ===
The Pioneer Detachment, which was based at Anne Arundel Community College, was a student-run detachment whose members were assigned cyber-security, medical, engineering, and force protection responsibilities.

=== 231st Troop Command ===
The MDDF Troop Command assigns members and units of the MDDF to work in tandem with the Maryland Army National Guard, Maryland Air National Guard, and Maryland Emergency Management Agency.

== See also ==
- Maryland Naval Militia
- Maryland Wing Civil Air Patrol
- United States Coast Guard Auxiliary
