= Kansas Wing Civil Air Patrol =

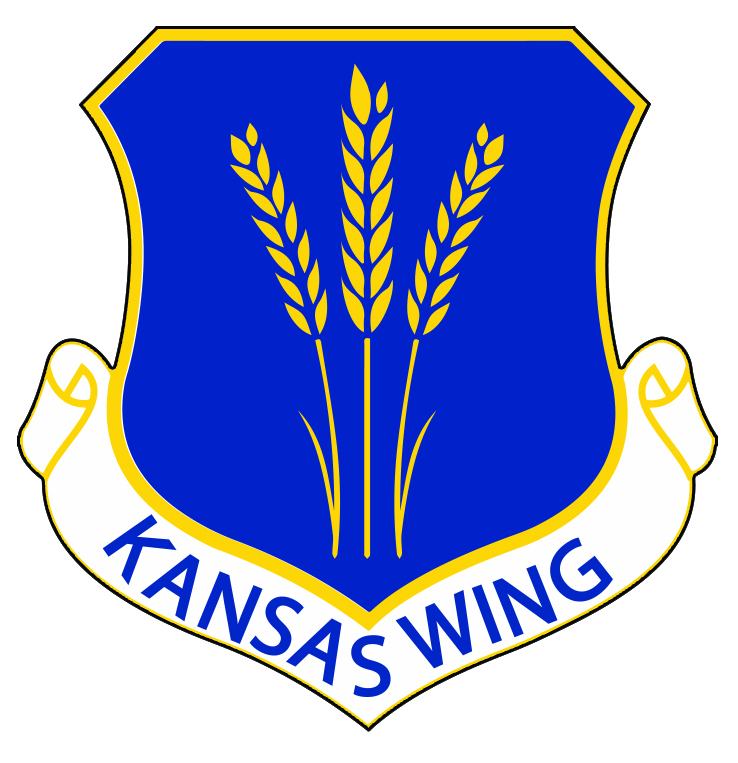
- Kansas Wing of Civil Air Patrol

Associated branches
- United States Air Force

Command staff
- Commander: Col Eric Davis
- Deputy Commander: Lt Col Chris Snyder Lt Col A. W. Pickel
- Chief of Staff: Lt Col Charles Lamb

Current statistics
- Cadets: 219
- Seniors: 218
- Total Membership: 437
- Website: kswg.cap.gov
- Statistics as of 7 May 2024

The Kansas Wing of Civil Air Patrol (CAP) is the highest echelon of Civil Air Patrol in the state of Kansas. Kansas Wing headquarters are located in Salina, Kansas. The Kansas Wing consists of over 400 cadet and adult members at 13 locations across the state of Kansas.

== History ==
Kansas Wing of the Civil Air Patrol was organized under its first commander, H. Howard Wilcox, in December 1941. Wilcox led the Kansas Wing until September 1947, followed by Paul D. Threlfall to April 1950. A total of 30 individuals have led the Kansas Wing since its formation.

The Kansas Wing assisted the neighboring Oklahoma Wing in their response to the 2013 Moore tornado by assisting with ground team photography of the tornado's path.

In March 2020, Kansas Wing members reported to Kansas' Emergency Operations Center to augment logistics and planning staff in response to the COVID-19 pandemic. Shortly thereafter, members began transporting lab specimens from rural and remote areas to the Kansas Department of Emergency Management's laboratory in Topeka.

== Mission ==
The Kansas Wing performs the three missions of Civil Air Patrol: providing emergency services; offering cadet programs for youth; and providing aerospace education for both CAP members and the general public.

=== Emergency services ===
Civil Air Patrol performs search and rescue, disaster relief, humanitarian service, and Air Force support missions, as well as homeland security and counter-drug operations.

=== Cadet programs ===
Civil Air Patrol provides cadet programs for youth aged 12–21 training in leadership, aerospace education, communication, and emergency services. Cadets receive training at weekly squadron meetings as well as through participating in local and wing level activities throughout the year. Cadets have the opportunity to attend encampments which provide a week of immersion training at a military installation.

=== Aerospace education ===
Civil Air Patrol provides aerospace education to both members of Civil Air Patrol and the public. Education provided to members is offered through the cadet program and through specialized education to CAP pilots. Education provided to the public is offered through educational materials provided to schools and private organizations.

== Organization ==
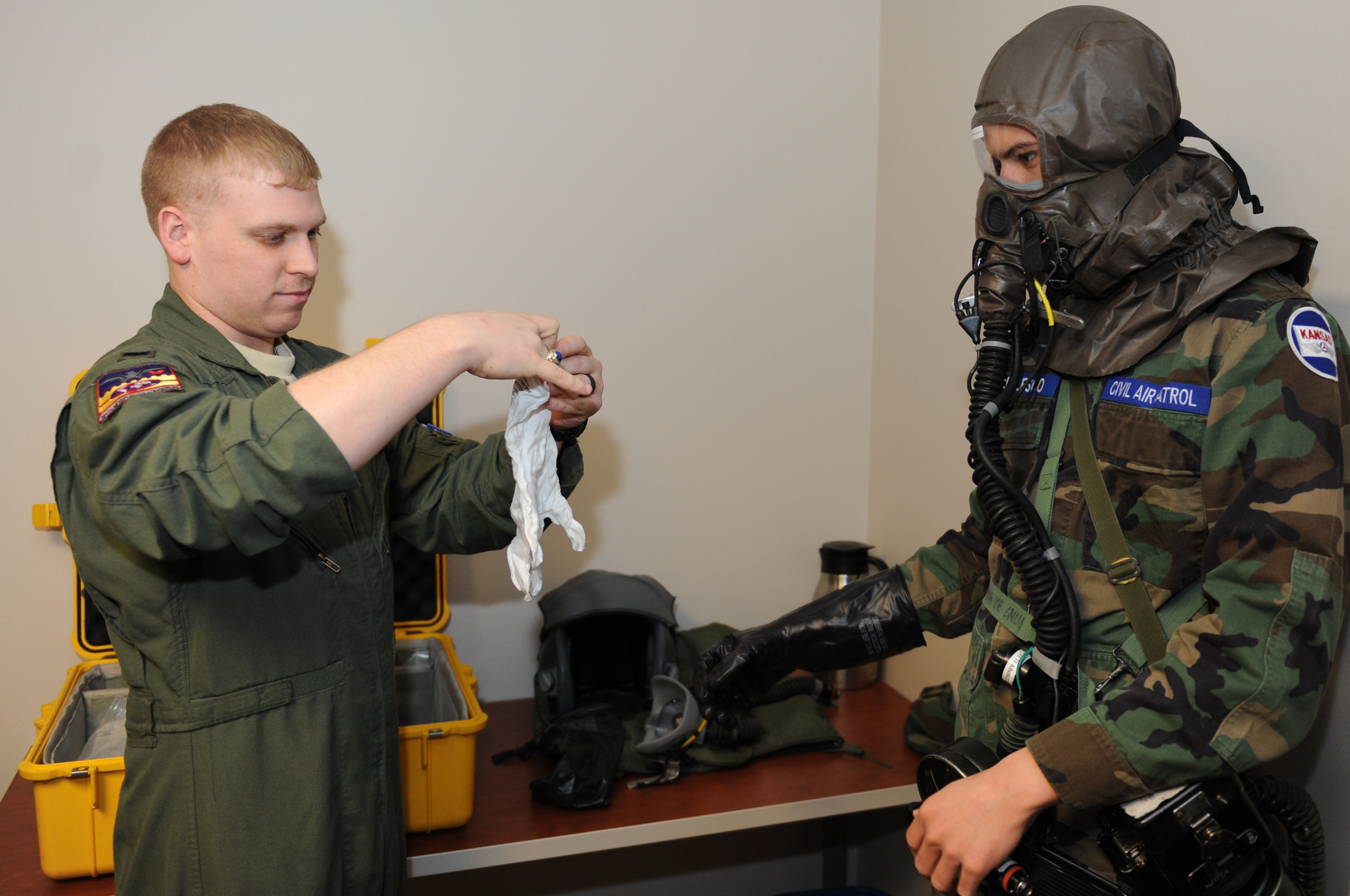
1st Lt. Ryan Cobb, 384th Air Refueling Squadron navigator, helps a Kansas Wing Civil Air Patrol cadet suit up in Mission Oriented Protective Posture gear.

Squadrons of the Kansas Wing
Designation	Squadron Name	Location	Notes
NCR-KS-001	Kansas Wing Headquarters	Salina	
NCR-KS-003	Konza Composite Squadron	Manhattan	
NCR-KS-034	Kansas City Composite Squadron	Kansas City	
NCR-KS-035	Topeka Eagle Composite Squadron	Topeka	
NCR-KS-055	Heartland Cadet Squadron	Lenexa	
NCR-KS-061	Lawrence Composite Squadron	Lawrence	
NCR-KS-066	Flint Hills Composite Squadron	Junction City	
NCR-KS-077	Emporia Composite Squadron	Emporia	
NCR-KS-086	Post Rock Composite Squadron	Russell	
NCR-KS-092	Smoky Hill Composite Squadron	Salina	
NCR-KS-123	New Century Composite Squadron	Olathe	
NCR-KS-125	Air Capital Composite Squadron	Wichita	
NCR-KS-999	Kansas Legislative Squadron	Topeka	

== See also ==
- United States Air Force
- Kansas Air National Guard
- Kansas Army National Guard
- Kansas State Guard
