= Kansas State Guard =

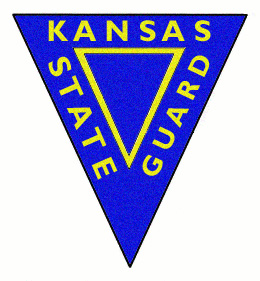
- Kansas State Guard insignia.
- Active: 1941–1948
- Country: United States
- Allegiance: Kansas
- Branch: Army
- Type: State defense force
- Role: Military reserve force
- Size: 1,300 (approximately)
- Garrison/HQ: Topeka, KS

Commanders
- State Military Leadership: Brigadier General Milton R. McLean; Adjutant General of Kansas during World War II Colonel Charles H. Browne Sr. Commander of the Kansas State Guard during World War II

The Kansas State Guard was the official state defense force of the state of Kansas during each of the world wars. The unit was first created during World War I, and was later reactivated during World War II. When the Kansas National Guard was federalized and deployed during each of the world wars, the state of Kansas was forced to raise and maintain its own military force in order to protect against saboteurs, quell riots, and perform other duties which would normally fall to the National Guard. Unlike the National Guard, which could be federalized and deployed abroad, the State Guard was funded and equipped solely by the state and as such was immune to deployment. The Kansas State Guard is authorized under Kansas law. In 2007, the Kansas Legislature considered a bill which would create a modern Kansas State Defense Force. The bill did not pass.

== Predecessor organizations ==
Prior to the Militia Act of 1903, which reorganized state militias into the National Guard of the United States, each state maintained its own militia, which could be used to supplement the full-time military in times of war.

=== Kansas Territorial Militia ===
After Kansas was opened for settlement in 1854, conflict broke out between pro-slavery and anti-slavery factions. The first official militia of Kansas was created to pursue a band of men, who had broken an anti-slavery suspect out of a pro-slavery sheriff's custody into the town of Lawrence, Kansas. The sheriff informed the governor that the town of Lawrence, by refusing to turn over the suspects, was in a state of insurrection. The militia, however, was largely composed of men from Missouri from the pro-slavery faction. Anti-slavery activists, fearing the Missourians would use this government order as an excuse to destroy the largely anti-slavery town, formed their own militias and fortified the town. What would become known as the Wakarusa War, the bloodless siege ended when the governor arrived and a treaty between the factions was negotiated, and the Missouri militia was disbanded and returned home.

In the following year, based on unfounded rumors that an anti-slavery militia was being led into Kansas from Nebraska, the acting governor of Kansas summoned the Kansas Territorial Militia into service, and once again the ranks were filled with pro-slavery Missourians who had crossed the border to take part in the conflict. When new territorial governor, John Geary, arrived, he ordered all militias on both sides disbanded. For the duration of the period before the Civil War, official Kansas militia units were balanced between pro-slavery and anti-slavery units.

=== Spanish–American War ===
During the Spanish–American War, four regiments of Kansas volunteers were organized. The 23rd Kansas Volunteer Infantry Regiment was deployed to Cuba, while the 20th Kansas Volunteer Infantry Regiment was deployed to the Philippines, and would later take part in counterinsurgency efforts against the local populace. The 21st and 22nd Kansas Infantry regiments remained stateside for the duration of the war.

=== Home Guard ===
During World War I, after it became clear that the National Guard would be deployed and as such would be unavailable to provide security for the state, individual cities, counties, and municipalities organized their own home guard units. However, these units were not officially recognized by the state, although they were legally permitted. Furthermore, they were not required to deploy outside the county or city in which they were based, limiting their usefulness. The civilian-organized Home Guard was disbanded and the Kansas State Guard was simultaneously created by executive order on February 15, 1918.

== World War I ==
As the Home Guard was dissolved, the Kansas State Guard was officially created by executive order on February 15, 1918. The Guard performed weekly drills, and provided security for key businesses and infrastructure for the duration of the war.

=== Membership ===
Although initially the State Guard was intended to have fitness requirements and was to be modeled after the National Guard, the authorization that was passed did not put a limit on the number of units created, and required only that members be United States citizens and over the age of eighteen.

=== Weapons ===
The United States government made available for the individual states a number of Mosin–Nagant rifles which were ordered by the Russian Empire but never delivered due to the Russian Revolution. These surplus rifles were made available to the states for use by their state guards. Kansas requested and received, 1,273 of these surplus rifles and a large quantity of ammunition from the federal government. On April 30, 1919, the rifles and ammunition were returned to a federal arsenal.

=== Deactivation ===
After the armistice was signed, National Guard units began returning to the United States. The Kansas State Guard was demobilized on October 15, 1919.

== World War II ==
The Kansas National Guard was federalized on 23 December 1940. In response, the Kansas Legislature passed the State Guard Act on 15 April 1941 which authorized the Kansas State Guard to be reactivated, and recruit one regiment of infantry composed of no more than thirty-three companies.

=== Membership ===
Members were required to be between the ages of twenty-one and fifty, with a higher age limit on certain officer positions. Although men who would be drafted into the federal military were not barred from admission, they were not actively recruited. The bulk of the force was composed of veterans of World War I, former National Guardsmen and other military veterans, and personnel with C.M.T.C. (Campus Military Training Corps) and R.O.T.C. experience. Despite its reliance on individuals with military experience, enlisted members received frequent weapons training during drills, and officers were required to complete an officer's training course taught in Topeka.

=== Weapons and equipment ===
The State Military Board was responsible for providing uniforms for the Kansas State Guard. So as not to compete for uniforms with the federal military services, state defense forces were required to choose colors not in use with the federal services. The Kansas State Guard had a khaki summer dress uniform, and a green winter uniform.

As they did in the first World War, the federal government provided surplus rifles to the states for the use of their state defense forces. However, due to a shortage of rifles among allied forces, these rifles were recalled, and the Kansas State Guard was instead issued shotguns. An American Legion post and a Spanish–American War Veterans organization lent the Guard some rifles for the duration of the war, but the average company was still equipped with thirty-eight shotguns and two Thompson submachine guns.

=== Deployment ===
Aside from regular patrols and drills, Dodge City, Garden City, and Great Bend Companies were activated to assist in recovery operations following floods along the Arkansas River which displaced hundreds.

=== Deactivation ===
The Kansas State Guard was not disbanded immediately after the end of the war. However, the regiment held its last drill on 30 June 1948.

== Reactivation effort ==
Under federal law, any of the states or territories in the United States may maintain a state defense force, and nearly half of them choose to do so. In 2007, a bill seeking to reestablish an active Kansas State Defense Force was submitted into the Kansas Legislature. The bill was not passed into law. In 2018, Kansas state senator Dennis Pyle, who filed the 2007 bill, petitioned the Governor of Kansas to reactivate the Kansas State Guard, in part to offer an additional security resource for schools.

== See also ==
- Kansas Wing Civil Air Patrol
