= United States Guards =

The United States Guards were a formation of the National Army created to guard strategic installations and areas in order to free infantry regiments for war service in the First World War.

== American Civil War ==
During the Civil War Colonel H.P. Montgomery offered to recruit a regiment in New York with the title of "United States Guards" but his offer was not accepted.

== World War I ==
The Guards were created on 22 December 1917 and were controlled by the Chief of the Militia Bureau. They eventually comprised 48 battalions of men who were either too old or physically unfit for active service.

The Guards were disbanded following the end of the war in 1920. The experience led the US Army to not wish to bear the financial burden of paying for troops whose only use was internal security.

== World War II ==
With the mobilization of the entire National Guard in 1940-1941, the idea of reforming the United States Guards was discussed in 1941 with the National Guard Bureau. However, the Bureau replied that the War Department did not want to use federal troops for internal security duties; instead, this function would be performed by the recently permanently-authorized state guards.

== See also ==
- Veteran Reserve Corps
- State defense force
