= Francis Takemoto =

American National Guard general

Francis S. Takemoto
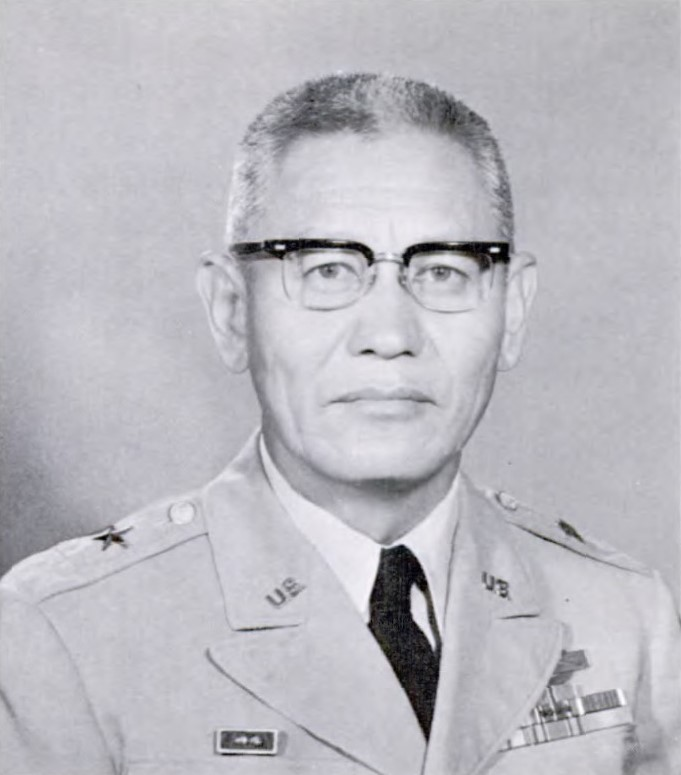
- Born: 28 November 1912; Honolulu, Hawaii
- Died: 26 May 2002 (aged 89) Honolulu, Hawaii
- Allegiance: United States of America
- Branch: United States Army
- Service years: 1935–1968
- Rank: Brigadier General
- Commands: 29th Infantry Brigade (Separate); 1st Battle Group, 299th Infantry; 1st Battalion, 298th Infantry; Headquarters Company, 299th Infantry
- Conflicts: World War II
- Awards: Bronze Star Medal; Purple Heart

Francis Shigeo Takemoto (Japanese: 竹本 繁雄, 28 November 1912 – 26 May 2002) was a Hawaii Army National Guard and United States Army Reserve brigadier general. A veteran of the famed 100th Infantry Battalion in World War II, he became the first Asian American promoted to general officer rank in 1964.

== Early life and education ==
Born in Honolulu on the island of Oahu, Takemoto graduated from McKinley High School. He received a B.S. degree in chemistry from the University of Hawaiʻi in 1935 and, having participated in the Army ROTC program, was commissioned as a second lieutenant of infantry in the Army Reserve on 13 July 1935. Takemoto subsequently earned a graduate teacher's certificate from Santa Barbara State College in 1940 and worked as a mathematics teacher on the island of Hawaii. He later graduated from the United States Army Command and General Staff College in 1953.

== Military career ==
After serving as an Army Reserve officer for eight years, Takemoto reported for active duty on 30 March 1943 and was sent to Camp Shelby in Mississippi to train with the 442nd Infantry. He was transferred to the 100th Infantry Battalion, 133rd Infantry Regiment, 34th Infantry Division in Italy in March 1944. Takemoto landed at Anzio and received a shrapnel wound to the side of his head a few days later while serving with Company D. After recuperation, he fought with the 100th Infantry in Italy and France and was promoted to first lieutenant on 21 November 1944. When the 100th Infantry was made part of the 442nd Infantry on 11 June 1944, Takemoto acted as liaison between the two commanders. He earned a Bronze Star Medal and the Purple Heart for his World War II service.

Released from active duty on 8 January 1946, Takemoto was promoted to captain in the Army Reserve on 25 September 1946 and given command of Headquarters Company, 299th Infantry, Hawaii Army National Guard on 20 November 1946. Promoted to major on 3 August 1948, he became executive officer of the 2nd Battalion, 299th Infantry. Promoted to lieutenant colonel on 19 February 1952, Takemoto served as executive officer of the 298th Infantry and then commander of the 1st Battalion, 298th Infantry. On 5 February 1960, he became executive officer of Headquarters, 29th Infantry Brigade.

On 1 July 1960, Takemoto was promoted to colonel. On 1 March 1963, he became commander of the 1st Battle Group, 299th Infantry and then commander of the 29th Infantry Brigade on 1 April 1963. In January 1964, he was promoted to brigadier general by Hawaii Governor John A. Burns. On 10 February 1964, President Lyndon B. Johnson nominated him to also be a brigadier general in the Army Reserve. Takemoto was confirmed by the full United States Senate on 27 February 1964. He continued to serve as commander of the 29th Infantry Brigade until 3 May 1968, preparing the unit for potential Vietnam War deployment. Takemoto retired on 4 May 1968, having reached the compulsory retirement point for National Guard personnel at the time. On 13 May 1968, the 29th Infantry Brigade was in fact activated for federal service.

== Civilian career ==
After World War II, Takemoto returned to teaching math. He was appointed principal of Aliamanu Elementary School in 1957 and then Manoa Elementary in 1965.

== Personal ==
Takemoto was the son of Japanese immigrants Tsunetaro Takemoto (11 January 1880 – 26 August 1971) and Tane Takemoto (3 March 1882 – 6 February 1970).

Takemoto married Gladys Chizuko Uyeno (12 June 1913 – 19 October 1996), a fellow teacher, on 28 August 1938. They had a daughter, a son and six grandchildren.

After his death in Honolulu, Takemoto was interred at the National Memorial Cemetery of the Pacific beside his wife on 11 June 2002.
