= 299th Cavalry Regiment =

- Coat of arms
- Active: 1898–present
- Country: United States
- Branch: Army National Guard
- Type: Cavalry
- Role: Reconnaissance and surveillance
- Size: Squadron
- Garrison/HQ: HHT and D FSC Hilo/Kona. A and B Troops Kalaeloa. C Troop Hanapepe/Kapa'a.
- Nickname: "Hawaiian Guardians" (special designation)
- Mottos: E Maka'ala Kakou; Let's Be Alert
- Equipment: M1151 HMMWVs, LPCs, Ravens, Support Vehicles
- Engagements: World War II; *Battle of Pearl Harbor Leyte Ryukyus Vietnam War Iraq War

Commanders
- Current commander: LTC Frederick J. Werner
- Command Sergeant Major: CSM Roger A. Uganiza

Insignia
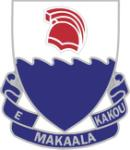
- Distinctive unit insignia
- Call sign: Koa

The 299th Cavalry Regiment, formerly the 299th Infantry Regiment, nicknamed "The Koa Squadron", is a unit of the Hawaii Army National Guard. It was established in 1923 from the old 2nd Hawaiian Infantry Regiment, and it served during World War II as part of the 24th Infantry Division. The name "Koa" comes from the Hawaiian word for "Warrior", and is currently headquartered in Hilo, Hawaii. The 1st and 2nd Battalions, 299th Infantry were federally activated in 1968 to support the United States Army Pacific during the Vietnam War. More recently 2nd Battalion, 299th Infantry Regiment deployed to Iraq and again after being re-flagged in 2007 as 1st Squadron, 299th Cavalry Regiment.

== Service history ==
The 299th Infantry Regiment was formed on 17 August 1923 from the old 2nd Hawaiian Infantry. Both the old 2nd Hawaiian Infantry and the new 299th were part of the Hawaii National Guard. The old 1st Hawaiian Infantry was also reformed and designated the 298th Infantry.

=== World War II ===
In 1940, the 299th Infantry and its sister regiment, the 298th Infantry were called into federal service as the United States began to prepare for a possible war with the Axis powers. In 1941, the Hawaiian Division was reformed from a square division, which was the army's World War I divisional format, into the triangular division that would be the norm for World War II and Korea. Out of the old division came both the 24th Infantry Division and the 25th Infantry Division. The 299th IN was sent to provide the third infantry regiment for the new 24th Infantry Division. In May 1941, the 299th was sent to the neighbor islands to provide for their defense, since the regiment was mostly composed of citizens from these islands.

As part of the US preparation for World War II, the Islands were on a war footing as an outpost of the United States. After the draft and activation of 1940, the makeup of the 299th changed dramatically, with a mix of Hawaiian, White, Japanese, Chinese, Portuguese, Puerto Rican, and other races. During this time, the 299th Infantry Regiment were removed from the Hawaii National Guard territorial control and fell under control of the active duty military. Despite some pushback from Washington DC, the multiethnic unit provided support for its active duty counterparts in Hawaii. Although the initial activation was only supposed to last for 12 months, it was extended in October 1941, much to the chagrin of many of the men who were federalized and taken away from their civilian jobs and families. Hawaii transitioned to possible attacks by conducting blackout drills and air raid practices that continued in Hawaii up until December 1941. The regiment was also able to increase its numbers due to the draft to provide a full regiment, and train despite not being given the most modern equipment.

In the aftermath of Pearl Harbor, the 299th Infantry Regiment was guarding the outer islands from possible invasion by the Empire of Japan. This was a real fear for Hawaii, as Japanese Imperial troops conquered across Asia and the Pacific Islands. Following 7 December 1941, The 299th Infantry enforced Martial Law across Hawaii Island, Maui, Molokai, and Kauai. As the de facto military governors of the islands, the unit's commanders prepared for possible invasion, enforced rationing and blackouts, coordinated with the County Governments, and made plans to integrate follow on forces into the defense of the outer islands. Many US military planners feared the Japanese would bypass Oahu and use Hawaii Island or Maui as landing sites and mass their combat power on the mostly agricultural lands, and then isolate and then seize Oahu from the US military. The 299th Infantry protected key infrastructure, manned defensive positions, and built defenses along the coasts.

Stress and fear in the wake of the Pearl Harbor in the islands was palpable. Gas masks were issued to all citizens as the Japanese had used gas countless times in China, a majority of the population of Hawaii were fingerprinted, and curfews were initiated. Nobody knew how strong the Japanese forces were, especially civilians who were not privy to military intelligence. On the night of 30 December 1941 the Japanese submarines launched a coordinated strike on Hilo, Hawaii, on Kahului, Maui, and Nawiliwili on Kauaʻi. The Japanese operation can best be described as ‘morale bombings’, as the attack was not significant enough take or destroy a military objective. In Hilo, the submarine I-1 surfaced and fired ten high explosive shells into Hilo piers before submerging once again. The shells landed primarily around Pier 1, damaging a "fenders and a concrete haunch and pile”. Overall, damage done was insignificant, however the aim of the operation was not to inflict high casualties or damage, but to inflict phycological damage and to jar the homefront. Soldiers of the 299th Infantry inspected the damage and found the shells fired into Hilo.

On 28 January 1942, the US Army Transport Ship Royal T. Frank, was bringing 26 soldiers of the 299th Infantry back home to Hawaii Island after finishing their basic training, which had been interrupted by the attack on Pearl Harbor. While in a three ship convoy, with the small cargo ship Kalae, and their escort the USS Trever (DMS-16) they departed from Maui and were crossing the ‘Alenuihāhā Channel between Maui and Hawaii Island. The Japanese submarine I-171, surfaced and fired two torpedo's that missed the Frank. The third torpedo launched hit the Frank, the ship is reported to have sunk in thirty seconds. Many below deck did not make it, the survivors swam in oil laden water for three hours awaiting rescue. Of the 60 people aboard the Frank, only 36 survived. Survivors of the explosion included nine of the Big Island soldiers who had been above deck and 27 crew members. Some were thrown into the water, and others jumped in soon afterwards. Covered in oil, the survivors spent hours in the ocean, many clinging to whatever debris they could, before they were picked up by the ammunition barge that had been the actual target of the Japanese submarine. Upon being rescued they were taken to Hana, Maui, where the Hana School, who had been preparing for emergencies since the war began, created a triage and first aid center and awaited military personnel. It took some time to reach Hana, but when the military arrived, they told the local population that the incident did not happen and were told to never tell anyone. Sixteen 299th Infantry soldiers of multiple ethnicities lost their lives, only nine survived. Eight would go on to fight in the 100th Infantry Battalion, and one would serve in the South Pacific with the 298th Infantry Regiment. They were from then known as "The Torpedo Gang" and gathered every 28 January to have a drink and remember their fallen comrades, this is why the unit has chosen 28 January as the Regimental Memorial Day. The sinking was kept classified, and the families of the sixteen were not told of how their loved one died until the end of the war. Fears of Japanese sentiment, martial law, and news of Japanese submarines still patrolling Hawaiian waters contributed to the decision to keep the sinking of the Frank classified. The Torpedo Gang survivors were also ordered not to tell anyone what happened.

Relief from the mainland finally started to arrive in March 1941, and the 299th Infantry began to transition to Scofield Barracks for service. Although the Hawaii Territorial Guard, created by the Governor of Hawaii following the attack on Pearl Harbor, eventually removed soldiers who were Americans of Japanese Ancestry in January 1942, the 299th Infantry and 298th Infantry did not. Soldiers of Japanese ancestry remained at their posts until June 1942.

On 4 June 1942, the Japanese-American soldiers of both the 299th and 298th were pulled from the ranks of the regiments, some 29 officers and 1277 enlisted men in all. These Hawaii Nisei (Japanese-Americans) would form the famed 100th Infantry Battalion later attached to the 442nd RCT and would fight heroically in Europe becoming the most decorated unit of its size in World War II. However the Nisei soldiers were nearly 40% of the 299th ranks, and the removal of these men put the regiment grossly under strength. Therefore, on 21 July 1942, the 299th was relieved from the 24th Infantry Division and deactivated, the unit's men and material being transferred to the 298th. However the 2nd Battalion, 299th's HHC and B Company remained intact. These units were sent overseas to the Philippines and the Ryukyu Islands for which the 2–299th received campaign participation. However it is not clear with whom they were attached and what role they played in these campaigns.

=== Post-War period ===
After the war, the Hawaii National Guard had to be reconstituted as most of their units had been deactivated and the men sent to other units. The 299th was activated in August 1946 and formed into the 299th Regimental Combat Team (RCT). The regiment was to have its companies on the islands of Hawai'i, Maui and Moloka'i, with the 298th Infantry taking O'ahu and Kaua'i. The process to rebuild the regiment was slow in the post-war years and but by May 1947 the regiment had over 1,000 men in ranks. However, by 1949, the 299th RCT was at full strength and equipped with new weapons and gear, taking part in a large military review with the 298th RCT at Schofield Barracks. In 1959 the 299th RCT was deactivated and the 299th Infantry with its 1st, 2nd and 3rd Battalions transferred to form the 29th Infantry Brigade Hawaii Army National Guard.

=== Vietnam activation ===
In May 1968 the 1st and 2nd Battalions of the 299th was called to active duty under its parent unit the 29th Infantry Brigade. The 299th reported to Schofield to begin training for any possible deployment to Vietnam or other Asian hotspots (i.e. Korea) The 29th SIB was to serve as a strategic reserve for the Army since active-duty units such as the 25th Infantry Division were tied up fighting in Vietnam. According to Hawaii's political leadership at the time, the 299th and the 29th Brigade were never intended to deploy to Vietnam when they were federalized. Nonetheless, many soldiers from the 299th went to Vietnam as individual replacements, serving in the active-duty units that were already in-country. Some 1,500 Hawaii Guard soldiers served in Vietnam during the 29th's mobilization, the majority of them coming from the 299th. Thirteen soldiers from the 299th died in Vietnam:

1st Battalion

- SGT Gaylord K. DeFries
- SP4 Rudy Aquino
- SP4 Walter D. Browne
- SP4 David Laamea
- SP4 John S. Otake
- PFC Earl C.M. Au Hoy

2nd Battalion

- 1LT John K. Kauhaihao
- SFC Edward L. Loo JR
- SGT Wilfredo B. Andrada
- SP4 Frank T. Longakit
- SP4 Alberto Milar JR
- PFC Dennis M. Silveri
- PFC Glenn T. Shibata

=== Operation Iraqi Freedom III ===
In August 2004 the 2nd Battalion, 299th Infantry Regiment was activated for deployment to Iraq with the 29th BCT (the 1st Battalion having been decommissioned after Vietnam). The 2–299th IN, commanded by LTC Kenneth Hara, began train-up at Schofield Barracks before moving to Ft. Bliss in October 2004. The bulk of the battalion's training was done at Camp McGreggor near Ft. Bliss. In January 2005 the battalion completed combat certification at JRTC in Ft. Polk, and began arriving in Iraq in February. The 2–299th IN was based out of Camp Victory in Baghdad where it was charged with base defense (i.e. manning the ECPs, guard towers and providing quick reaction forces). In addition, the battalion was also responsible for security in the areas and neighborhoods surrounding Camp Victory (such as Al Furat, Makasib and parts of Route Irish) conducting patrols and cordon and search missions to capture, kill, or disrupt the enemy insurgents in the area. During the 2–299th's IN deployment the battalion's strength was augmented by the attachment of A Company, 2d Battalion, 297th Infantry Regiment from the Alaska Army National Guard. The battalion redeployed from Iraq in February 2006. For its service, 2nd Battalion, 299th Infantry Regiment was awarded the Meritorious Unit Citation.

=== Conversion to cavalry ===
When the 2–299th Infantry returned from Iraq they began the process of being re-flagged into a reconnaissance squadron under the command of LTC Kenneth Hara. They would become 1st Squadron, 299th Cavalry, a "cav scout" squadron, and serve as the eyes and ears of the 29th IBCT. On 1 September 2007 the 299th Cavalry officially inherited the lineage, honors and history of their 299th Infantry predecessors. There were many transitions during this period as the 29th Separate Infantry Brigade (Enhanced) morphed into the 29th Infantry Brigade Combat Team, part of the Army's new modular Unit of Action doctrine. All of the battalion's former infantry companies were reflagged as cavalry troops and a forward support company was added, maintaining the lineages of the previous units. A Troop and B Troop, 1st Battalion, 299th Cavalry were stationed in Pearl City, Oahu taking their lineages from D Company and B Company, 2nd Battalion, 299th Infantry respectively. C Troop, 1st Battalion, 299th Cavalry was positioned on Kauai in the Hanapepe and Kapa'a armories. They took their lineage from A Company, 2nd Battalion, 299th Infantry and maintained their infantrymen as a dismounted reconnaissance troop. HHT remained on the Big Island of Hawaii in Hilo, taking its lineage from 2nd Battalion, 299th Infantry.

During this time, many soldiers on the Big Island of Hawaii found themselves in a new position as many units on that island were reflagged as Company D, Forward Support 29th BSB, taking its lineage from C Company, 2nd Battalion, 299th Infantry and stationed in the Hilo and Kona armories. This forward support company was added to 1st Battalion, 299th Cavalry as its support arm, and was made up of mostly HHC, 2nd Battalion, 299th Infantry's Support Platoon, mechanics from HHC 2–299th IN's Maintenance, infantryman from B Company 2-299 IN and HHC Mortar Platoon, and combat engineers from 227th Combat Engineer Company. Many of the soldiers had to change their military occupational specialties (MOS) as their new positions required them to change their branches. Then squadron was now retasked from an infantry battalion to a reconnaissance squadron that was built to provide intelligence to the 29th IBCT's commander.

=== Operation Iraqi Freedom VIII ===
Following the 1–299th Cavalry's conversion to cavalry, the squadron was assigned to Camp Buehring, Kuwait in November 2008 as part of a convoy security task force. As "Task Force Koa," the squadron was commanded by LTC Rudolph Ligsay and CSM Craig Ynigues. TF Koa conducted convoy escorts from logistical bases in Kuwait, into and throughout the entire Iraq Theater of Operations. From Basra in the south to Mosul in the north, 1–299th Cavalry escorted supply and equipment convoys all over the country. The squadron had four convoy security companies in total, as they were augmented by other units within the 29th IBCT. Among the units was the Headquarters, Headquarters Troop 1–299th Cavalry (Hellfire) commanded by CPT Kevin Carbrey, Convoy Security Company (CSC) 1 was A Troop, 1–299th Cavalry (Roughriders) commanded by CPT James Fea-Fiame, CSC 2 was B Troop, 1–299th Cavalry (Blackjack) commanded first by CPT Jonathan Ishikawa and later CPT Peter Ammerman, CSC 3 was A Company 29th BSTB (Sapper) commanded by CPT Audreth "Tino" Tumpap, CSC 4 was A Battery 1–487th FA BN (Animal) commanded by CPT Timothy Spencer. The vehicles the convoy escort teams (CET) used at the time were originally the M1151 Armored HMMWV, and later the Mine Resistant Ambush Protected (MRAP) vehicles were used as the lead vehicles. As TF Koa, 1–299 CAV logged well over 10,000 miles and engaged in numerous contacts with the enemy. The unit also took over escorts of US troops to the Kuwait City International Airport late in their deployment, providing security for soldiers leaving theater on emergency leave. The unit redeployed in August 2009 and focused on its new role as a reconnaissance squadron.

=== Operation Enduring Freedom ===
In support of "Operation Enduring Freedom", members of the 1–299 Cavalry have been deployed on an ongoing mission to augment the Joint Special Operations Task Force-Philippines. They assisted in training the Philippine Marines, and augment them as a security element. In 2008 some volunteers from the 1–299 Cavalry were sent to help augment the 1–158 IN (AZ ARNG), a new member battalion of the 29th IBCT, in their deployment to Afghanistan. In November 2012, senior officers, non-commissioned officers, and some enlisted soldiers of the 1–299th Cavalry were selected and deployed forward to Afghanistan as security forces advisor teams (SFAT) as part of a group pooled from the 29th IBCT to train the Afghan National Security Forces. The SFAT advisors were distributed throughout southern Afghanistan in support of the Afghan National Security Forces and ISAF initiatives in the Regional Command-South.

=== Multinational Force & Observers ===
In October 2018, the 1-299 Cavalry, commanded by LTC John Udani and CSM Shon Antolin, were deployed as Peacekeepers to the Sinai, Egypt as part of the Multinational Force and Observers (MFO) mission. Rather than wearing the United Nations’ blue beret and helmet cover, the MFO is an independent peacekeeping organization. Here the 1-299 Soldiers, now known by their rotation number United States Battalion 65 (USBATT65), wore the orange beret, caps, and helmet covers to symbolize their roles as Peacekeepers in a Multinational Peacekeeping Organization. The Squadron served with and within Combined Joint Battalions and Staff from October 2018 through July 2019.

The unit was split in two with LTC Udani taking charge of South Camp with HHT and C Troop as part of the MFO's Southern Battalion (SOUTHBATT). Their mission here was to conduct the MFO's observe, verify, and report possible treaty violations, ensuring the Treaty of Peace endured between Egypt and Israel. In the Southern portion of Zone C of the Sinai Peninsula, the 1-299 Cavalry, was joined in SOUTHBATT with Fijian and Australian Defence Force Members. Here C Troop was tasked with the security of South Camp as part of the South Camp Response Team as well as three Observation Posts to watch for possible violations. One Observation Post was on Tiran Island Where the troops only received resupply by helicopter. The unit also worked with the Italian Navy and conducted several training missions with them. The Squadron Staff were charged with coordinating missions in the south and for overall security of the base. The unit took charge of planning and securing several high ranking diplomatic visits to include United Nations symposiums.

In the Northern half of Zone C of the Sinai Peninsula, the 1-299 Cavalry Soldiers in the North were taken charge by MAJ Kawika Hosea, the Squadron Executive Officer. A detachment of HHT Staff and B Troop, were placed at FOB North where they were tasked with providing security and command and control of MFO and US assets as part of the Northern Battalion (NORTHBATT) Staff and B Troop as part of the FOB North Response Team. The Battalion Commander was a Colombian Army LTC, while the Squadron Executive Officer served as the Second in Command and Chief of Operations for the Northern Area of Operations. MAJ Hosea also served as the Acting Battalion Commander for the Multinational Battalion for three months while the Colombian Commanders were on leave. Here the Squadron Staff were fully integrated into the Multinational Staff with members from Colombia, Canada, Australia, New Zealand, Uruguay, the United Kingdom, The United States, the Czech Republic, Egypt, Japan, and Fiji. The unit served as the head of MFO missions in the Northern Sinai and provided security of FOB North. As the Egyptian Armed Forces were combatting insurgents in the Northern Sinai, the unit was on a heightened alert throughout their tour having to carry their weapons even while off duty. There were minor contact with insurgent forces by the MFO, but it remained a neutral observer to ensure the peace between Egypt and Israel. Sometimes threatened with closed routes, FOB North faced several shortages of resupply. The MFO role was to ensure the tenets of the peace treaty and facilitate peaceful communication between Egypt and Israel, hosting several meetings and security for these meetings. The also processed reported treaty violations through the MFO Chain of Command in South Camp. While there in the North, the unit conducted several training missions with their Multinational partners. B Troop also provided security for the Civilian Observation Unit while they conducted their operations.

The unit conducted three Spur Rides while deployed. Awarding Spurs to several 1-299 Cav, Active Duty, Italian, Colombian, and New Zealand service members. They were replaced by their fellow 29th IBCT unit, the 1-294 IN from Guam, in July 2019.

=== National Guard civil support ===
The Squadron has participated numerous times in support of civil authorities over its lifetime. The unit has supported Kauai County with humanitarian aid in 1992 following the devastation of Hurricane Iniki. The Squadron had also supported lava response in Hawaii County in the Puna District in 2015 and 2018. 1-299 CAV provided security for dignitaries during the Asian Pacific Economic Cooperation conference in November 2011, protecting routes and locations for delegations from the 21 member economies as they met in Honolulu, Hawaii. And most recently the 1-299 CAV have supported COVID-19 response all across the State of Hawaii, providing supervision, planning assistance, security, screening, and testing for Hawaii's response to the numerous agencies during the COVID-19 pandemic. As the Squadron is spread across the State of Hawaii in each county, 1-299 CAV is often called on to support the different counties in the State of Hawaii. As part of its State mission to support the Governor of the State of Hawaii, the 1-299 CAV stands by to provide support to the local communities that they are a part of.

== Campaign history ==
Campaign participation credit:

World War II

- Central Pacific
- Western Pacific
- Leyte
- Ryukyus

Global War on Terrorism

- Iraq:
  - Iraqi Governance
  - National Resolution

Multinational Force and Observers

- Peacekeeping in Sinai, Egypt

== Honors ==
The following are the unit awards for the 299th Cavalry Regiment:

Meritorious Unit Commendation (Army), Streamer embroidered IRAQ 2005–2006 (2nd Battalion, 299th Infantry Regiment)

Meritorious Unit Commendation (Army), Streamer embroidered IRAQ 2008–2009 (1st Squadron, 299th Cavalry Regiment)

Philippine Presidential Unit Citation, Streamer embroidered 17 October 1944 TO 4 July 1945
