= 777th Aviation Support Battalion =

777th Aviation Support Battalion (777th ASB)
- Country: United States of America
- Branch: National Guard
- Type: Battalion
- Role: Aviation support
- Size: Approx 670 Soldiers
- Part of: Army National Guard: Arkansas, Oklahoma, Hawaii

The 777th Aviation Support Battalion (777th ASB) is a U.S. Army National Guard battalion. It was stationed at Balad Air Base in Balad, Iraq during its deployment for the Iraq War. The current challenge coin issued was designed by Ret. Sergeant Joseph M. Traylor.

== Structure ==
- Headquarters Support Company, 777th Aviation Support Battalion, at Robinson Army Airfield (AR)
- Company A (Distribution), 777th Aviation Support Battalion, in Okmulgee (OK) — (Oklahoma Army National Guard)
- Company B (AVIM), 777th Aviation Support Battalion, at Wheeler Army Airfield (HI) — (Hawaii Army National Guard)
  - Detachment 1, Company B (AVIM), 777th Aviation Support Battalion, at Isla Grande Airport (PR) — (Puerto Rico Army National Guard)
  - Detachment 2, Company B (AVIM), 777th Aviation Support Battalion, at Robinson Army Airfield (AR)
  - Detachment 3, Company B (AVIM), 777th Aviation Support Battalion, at Bryant Army Heliport (AK) — (Alaska Army National Guard)
  - Company C (Signal), 777th Aviation Support Battalion, at Robinson Army Airfield (AR)
