= Alaska Army National Guard =

Component of the US Army and military of the U.S. state of Alaska

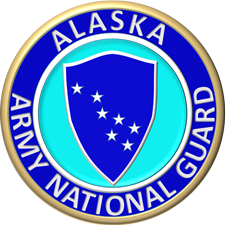
- Seal of the Alaska Army National Guard
- Active: 1940–present
- Country: United States
- Allegiance: Alaska
- Branch: United States Army National Guard
- Type: ARNG Headquarters Command
- Part of: National Guard Bureau; Alaska Department of Military and Veterans Affairs
- Garrison/HQ: Fort Richardson, Alaska

Insignia
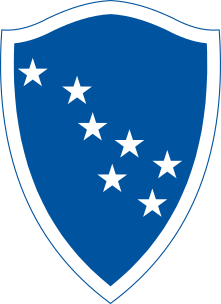
- Shoulder sleeve insignia

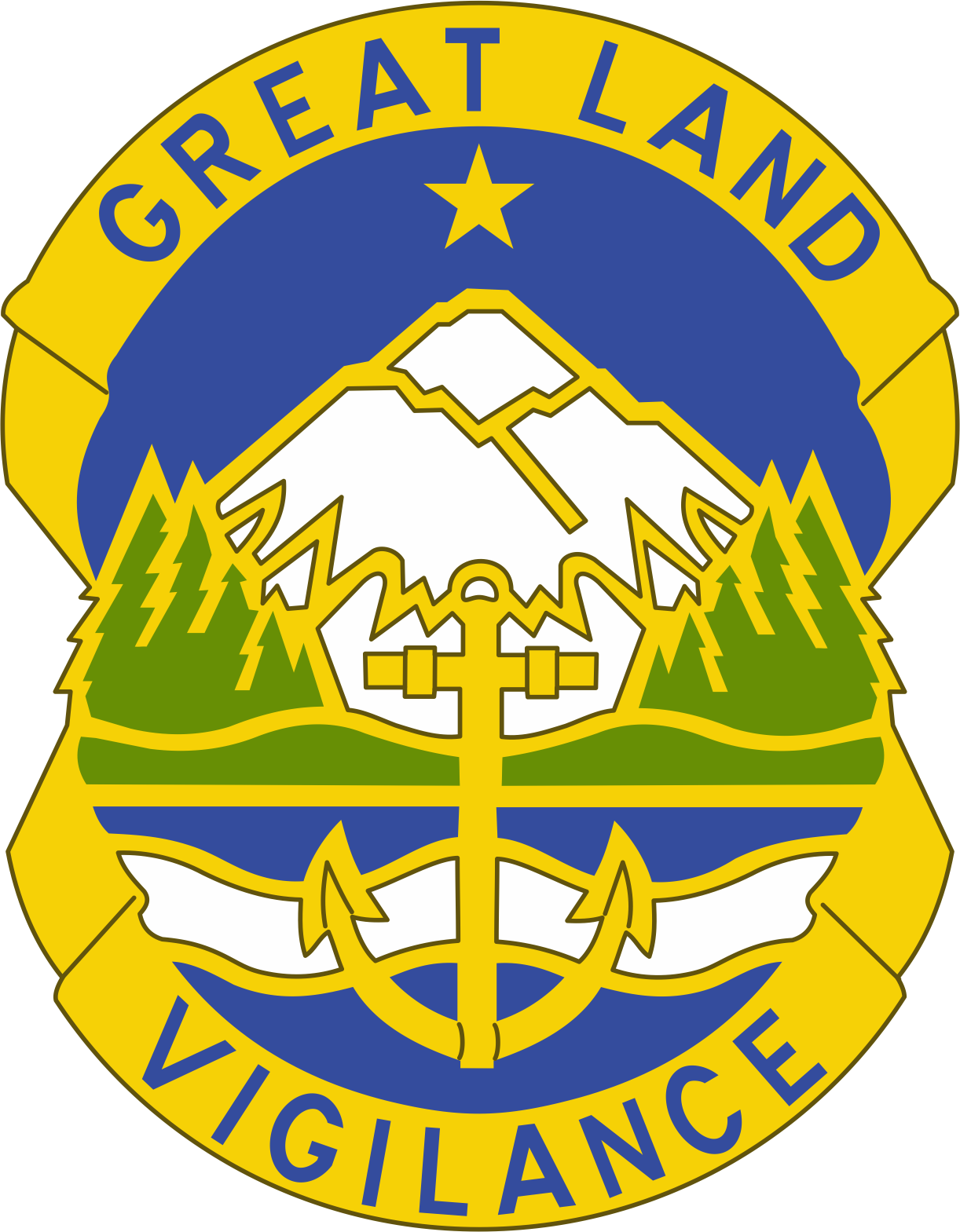
- Distinctive unit insignia

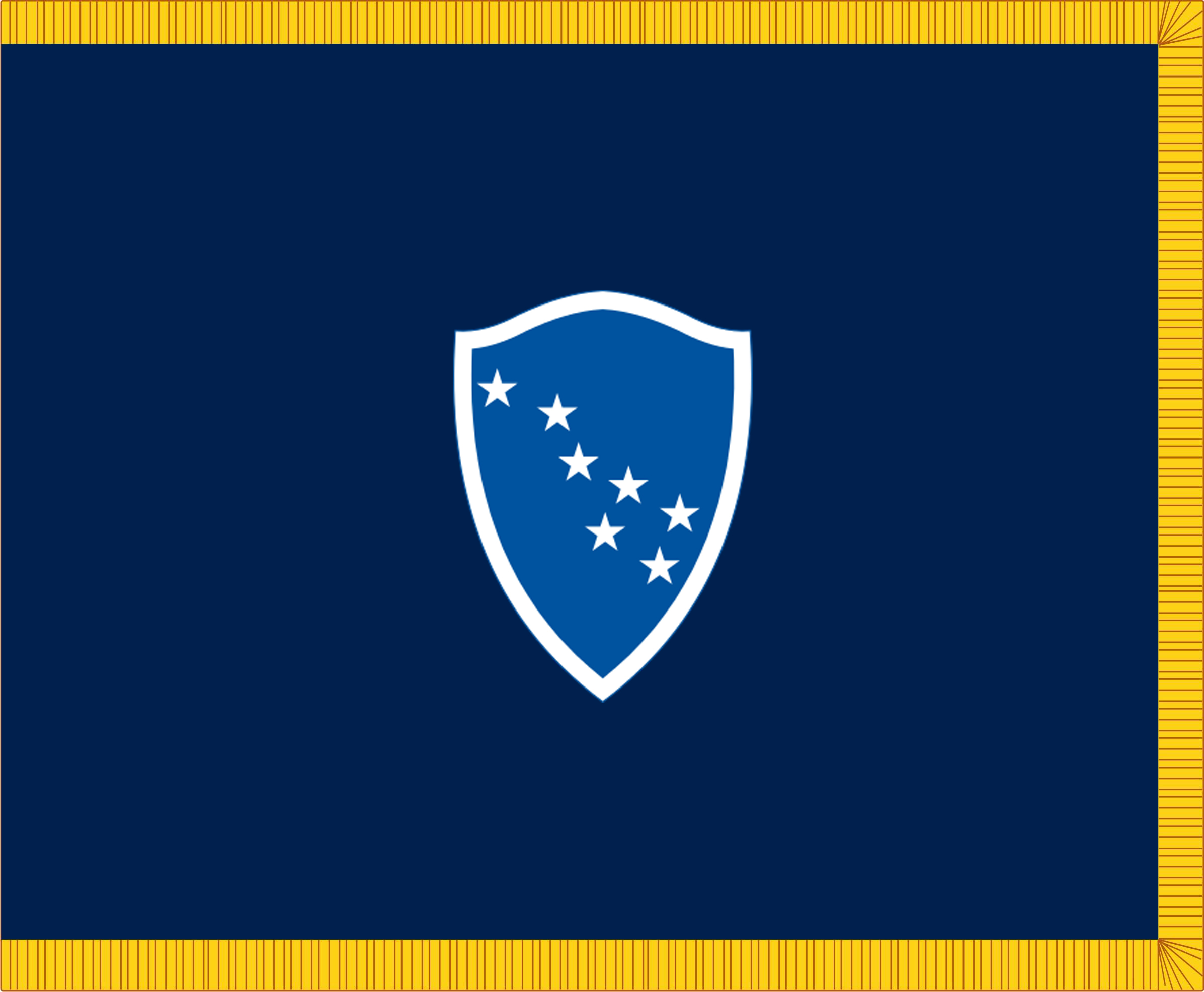
- Unit Flag of Alaska National Guard Headquarters

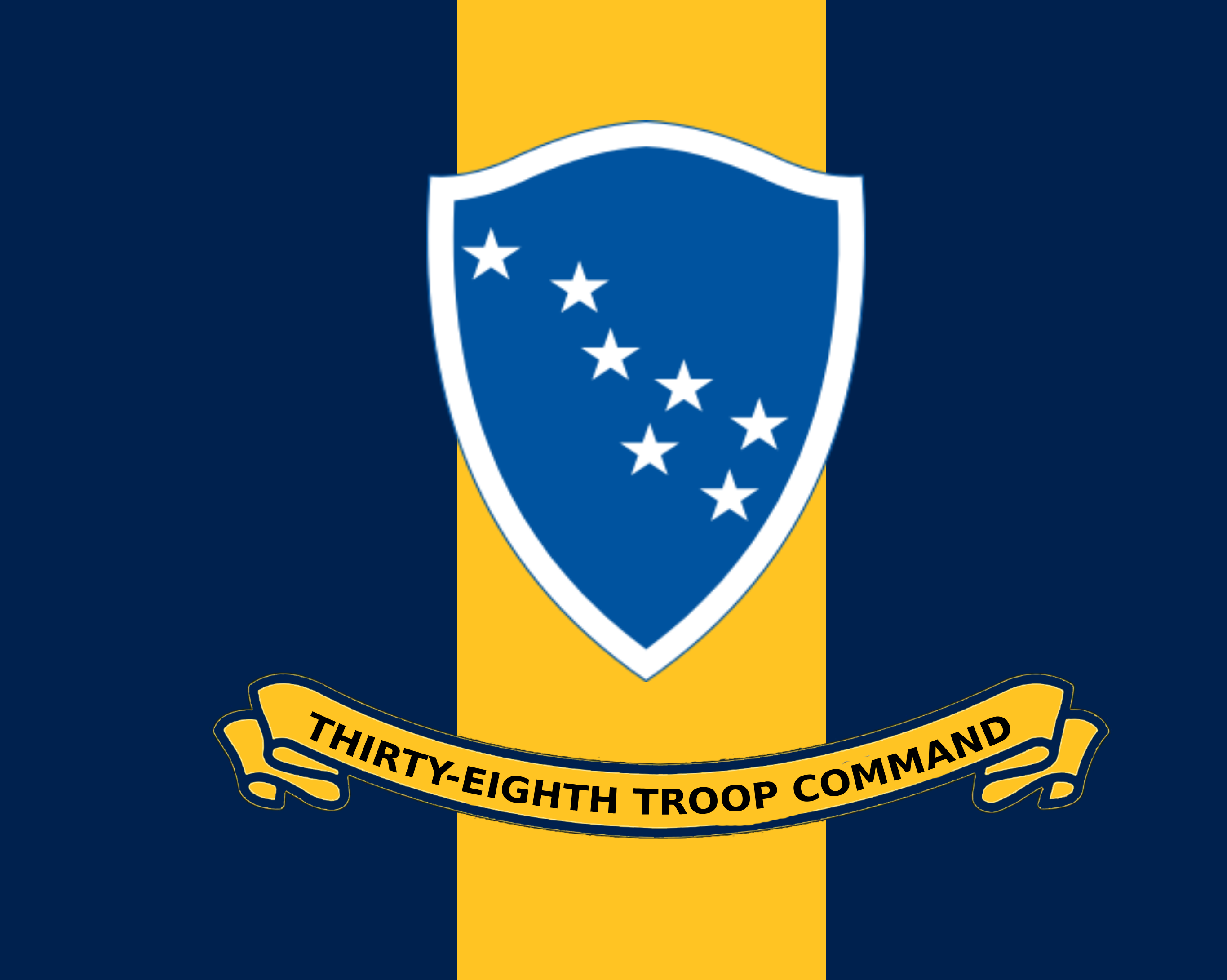
- Alaska Army National Guard 38th Troop Command Flag

The Alaska Army National Guard is a component of the United States Army and the Alaska Department of Military and Veterans Affairs. Along with the Alaska Air National Guard, it makes up the Alaska National Guard. Alaska Army National Guard units are trained and equipped as part of the United States Army. The same ranks and insignia are used and National Guardsmen are eligible to receive all United States military awards. The Alaska Guard also bestows a number of state awards for local services rendered in or to the state of Alaska.

In 2025, the Alaska Army National Guard was composed of approximately 1,190 soldiers and maintained many armories and other facilities, including Fort Greely.

== History ==
The Alaska Army National Guard was originally formed in 1940-41. However, since the Second World War, the Alaska Army National Guard had not seen significant overseas deployments. It appears that the 207th Infantry Battalion was active in the state after the Second World War, with its distinctive unit insignia and coat of arms originally approved on 4 June 1952. However it was rescinded (cancelled) on 10 May 1960.

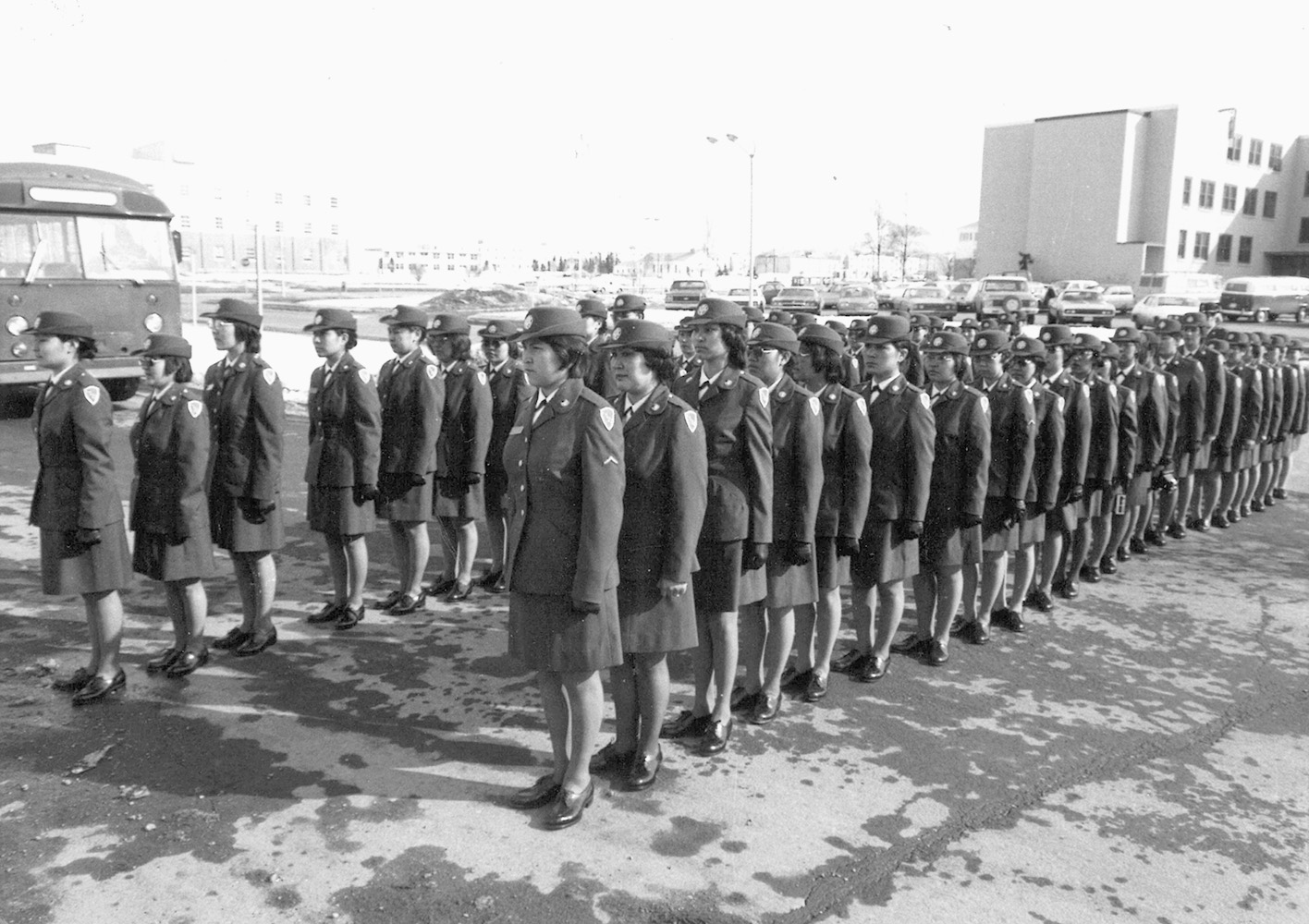
Members of the 297th Infantry Regiment awaiting their graduation ceremony upon completing a special basic training course at Camp Carroll, Alaska, 7 April 1976

In 1976, the Alaska National Guard asked the Women's Army Corps Center to develop and conduct a basic training program for female members of the Guard. The scout battalions of the 297th Infantry, Army National Guard, which patrolled the western border of Alaska, recruited native Alaskan women for duty and it needed a special training program. The WAC Center assigned a team of trainers to the project. "The team visited Alaska, studied the problems involved, returned to Fort McClellan, drew up a course, then returned to Alaska." Fifty-two female recruits participated in the course at Camp Carroll in Anchorage, and fifty-one graduated. The course taught "map reading, marching, communications procedures, intelligence gathering, arctic survival and bivouac, first aid, weapons (M16 rifle), and other subjects." After completing the basic training, the women went to Army training schools outside Alaska for advanced individual training before being assigned for duty with the scout battalions. The course was successful and it was repeated in 1978.

In 2004, a company of infantry was mobilized to serve in Iraq, serving with the Hawaii Army National Guard's 29th Brigade in 2005. In 2005 through 2008 smaller detachments were deployed to both Iraq and Afghanistan. An infantry battalion was deployed to the Middle East in 2006, and another infantry company was deployed to Iraq in 2007. The Alaska Army National Guard's aviation units have seen a series of company-sized rotations to Iraq, including the loss of a helicopter and crew in January 2006.

These deployments seem small in comparison to the units that other states have deployed. However given the small size of Alaska's population and National Guard they represent a very large percentage of the Alaska Army National Guard. When young men are deployed there is a particular impact on smaller "Alaska Bush" villages that have a subsistence lifestyle.

The 49th Missile Defense Battalion (GMD) is an Alaska Army National Guard unit that is permanently on active duty at Fort Greely, as part of the 100th Missile Defense Brigade (GMD).

The Alaska Army National Guard regularly sends soldiers to train in Mongolia as part of the State Partnership Program. In addition, the Mongolian Army deployments to Iraq were typically accompanied by Alaska Army Guard members. Now that the Mongolian Army has shifted its focus to Afghanistan, Alaska National Guard soldiers accompany them there.

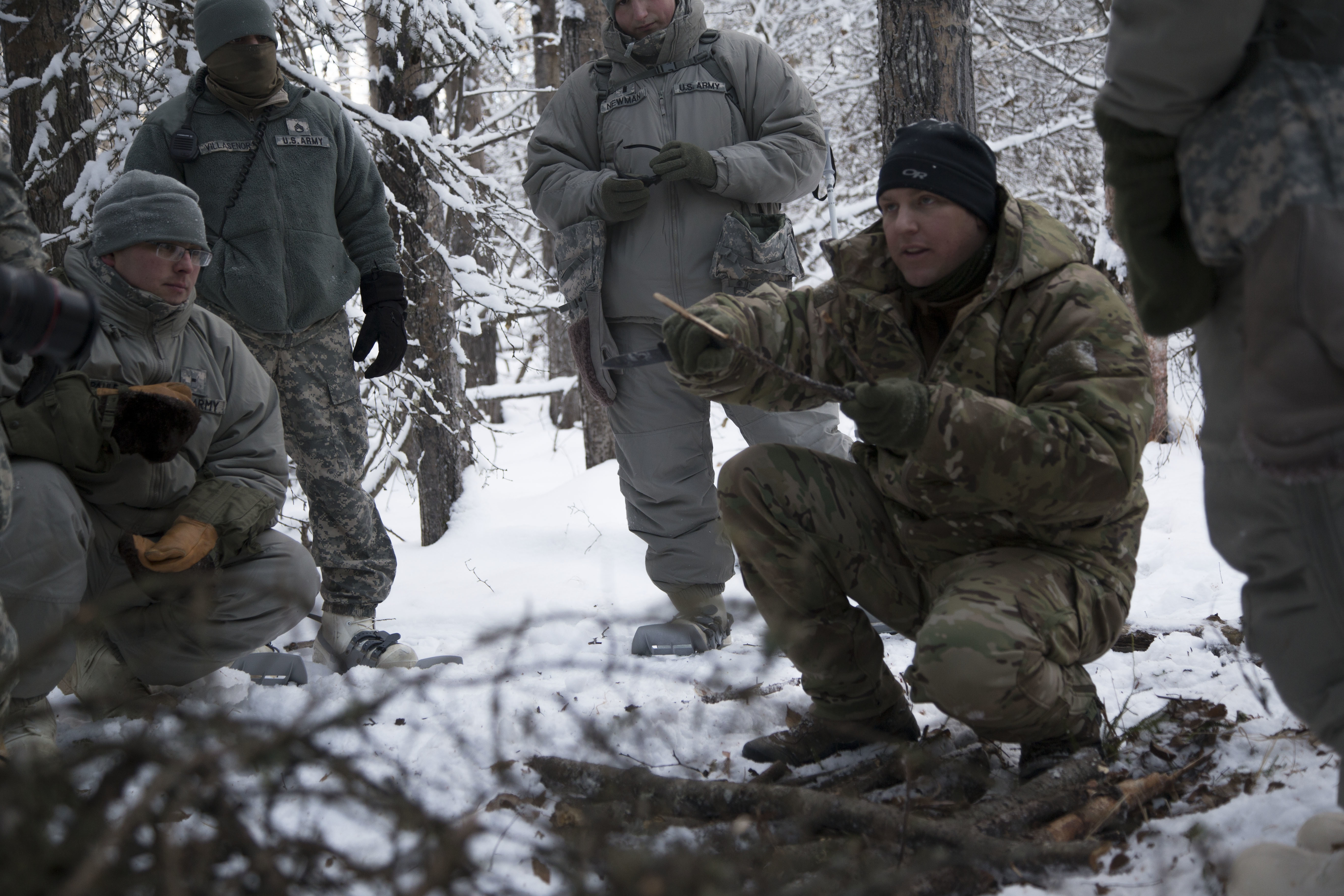
An instructor conducting a cold-weather preparedness class, January 2015

In 2007 the original insignia of the 207th Infantry Battalion was readopted for use by the 207th Regiment; the insignia was reinstated and redesignated for the 207th Regiment with the description and symbolism revised on 7 April 1997.

In 2008, the Alaska Guard began transforming the 207th Infantry Group into the modular 297th Battlefield Surveillance Brigade. It had originally been intended to become the 207th Infantry Brigade Combat Team, prior to the National Guard Rebalance Initiative. In addition the 38th Troop Command was stood up to provide command and control for miscellaneous units.

In 2013, media coverage increasingly focused on allegations of misconduct within the Alaska National Guard. These incidents included the dismissal of a senior officer in a high-profile post for failing to control or actively encouraging sexual misconduct among subordinates, as well as allegations of longstanding problems with both sexual assaults within the ranks and a command climate that suppressed reporting of these crimes and targeted whistle blowers for retaliation. By late 2013, the situation had become high-profile enough that the Alaska National Guard leadership appointed a special investigator to pursue inquiries into the pervasive problem of sexual misconduct and the organizational culture and command climate that condoned and promoted it.

== Organization ==
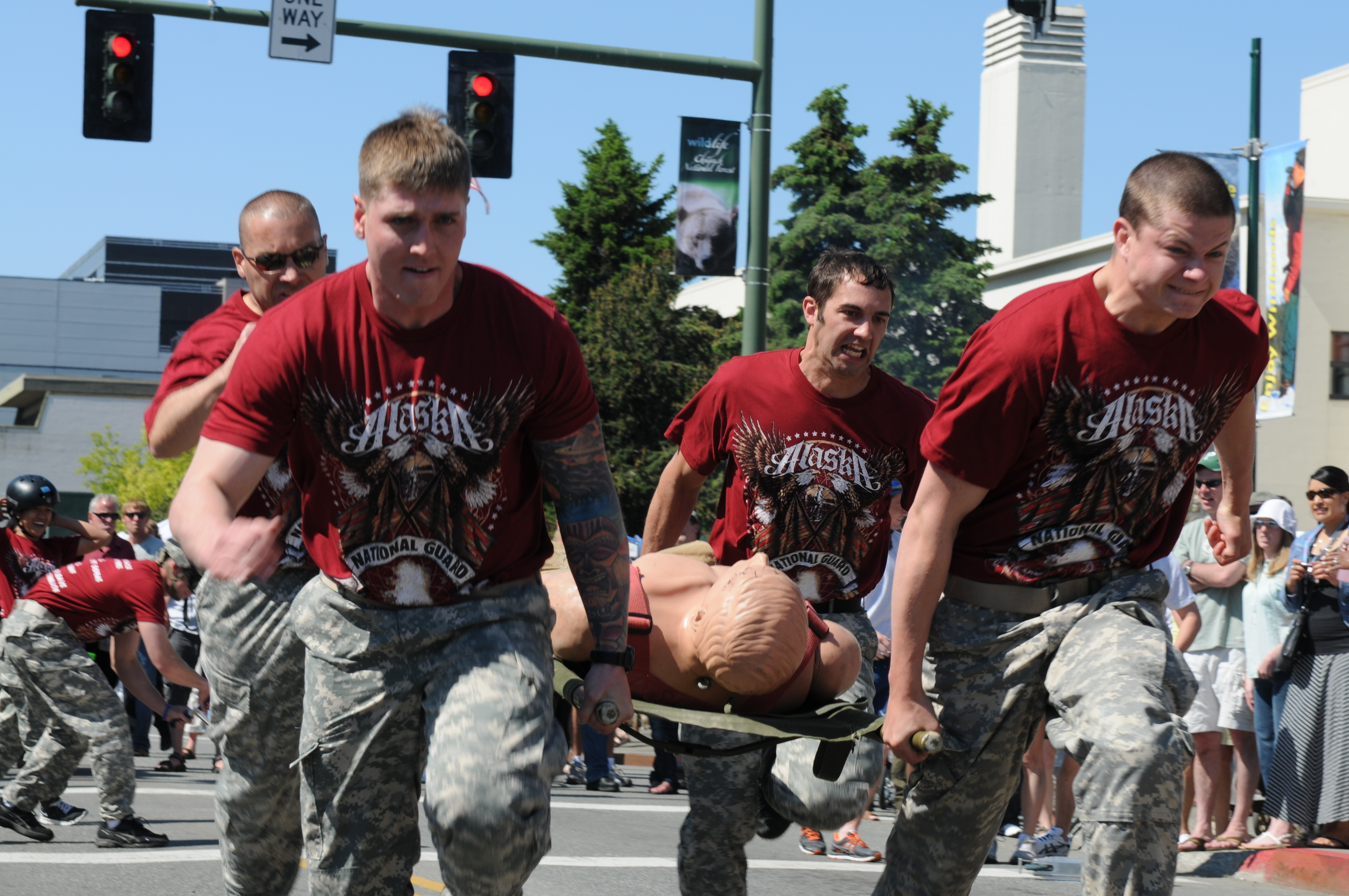
Alaska Army National Guardsmen competing in the Hero Games, 23 June 2012

As of January 2026 the Alaska Army National Guard consists of the following units:

- Joint Force Headquarters-Alaska, Army Element, at Joint Base Elmendorf–Richardson
  - Headquarters and Headquarters Company, Joint Force Headquarters-Alaska, Army Element, at Joint Base Elmendorf–Richardson
  - Alaska Recruiting & Retention Battalion, at Joint Base Elmendorf–Richardson
  - Alaska Medical Detachment, at Joint Base Elmendorf–Richardson
  - Army Aviation Support Facility #1, at Bryant Army Heliport
  - Army Aviation Operations Facility #1, at Nome Airport
  - Army Aviation Operations Facility #2, at Bethel Airport
  - Army Aviation Operations Facility #3, at Kotzebue Airport
  - Army Aviation Operations Facility #4, at Juneau Airport
  - Unit Training Equipment Site #1, at Joint Base Elmendorf–Richardson
  - Combined Support Maintenance Shop #1, at Joint Base Elmendorf–Richardson
  - Field Maintenance Shop #1, in Juneau
  - Field Maintenance Shop #2, in Bethel
  - Field Maintenance Shop #5, at Fort Wainwright
  - Field Maintenance Shop #6, at Joint Base Elmendorf–Richardson
  - 297th Regional Support Group, at Joint Base Elmendorf–Richardson
    - Headquarters and Headquarters Company, 297th Regional Support Group, at Joint Base Elmendorf–Richardson
    - 49th Adjutant General Detachment (Theater Gateway — Personnel Accountability Team), at Joint Base Elmendorf–Richardson
    - 134th Public Affairs Detachment, at Joint Base Elmendorf–Richardson
    - 208th Engineer Detachment (Construction Management Team), at Joint Base Elmendorf–Richardson
    - 297th Military Police Detachment (Law Enforcement), in Wasilla
    - 910th Engineer Company (Engineer Support Company), at Joint Base Elmendorf–Richardson
  - 38th Troop Command, at Joint Base Elmendorf–Richardson
    - Headquarters and Headquarters Company, 38th Troop Command, at Joint Base Elmendorf–Richardson
    - 103rd Civil Support Team (WMD), at Joint Base Elmendorf–Richardson
    - 49th Missile Defense Battalion, at Fort Greely (part of 100th Missile Defense Brigade)
      - Headquarters and Headquarters Company, 49th Missile Defense Battalion, at Fort Greely
      - Company A, at Fort Greely
    - 1st Battalion, 297th Infantry Regiment, at Joint Base Elmendorf–Richardson (part of 29th Infantry Brigade Combat Team)
      - Headquarters and Headquarters Company, 1st Battalion, 297th Infantry Regiment
      - Company A, 1st Battalion, 297th Infantry Regiment
      - Company B, 1st Battalion, 297th Infantry Regiment
      - Company C, 1st Battalion, 297th Infantry Regiment, in Afton (WY) — (Wyoming Army National Guard)
      - Company D (Weapons), 1st Battalion, 297th Infantry Regiment, in Laramie (WY) — (Wyoming Army National Guard)
      - Company J (Forward Support), 29th Brigade Support Battalion
  - 207th Aviation Troop Command, at Bryant Army Heliport
    - Headquarters and Headquarters Company, 207th Aviation Troop Command, at Bryant Army Heliport
    - Company A (CAC), 1st Battalion (General Support Aviation), 168th Aviation Regiment, at Bryant Army Heliport (UH-60L Black Hawk)
      - Detachment 3, Headquarters and Headquarters Company, 1st Battalion (General Support Aviation), 168th Aviation Regiment, at Bryant Army Heliport
      - Detachment 3, Company D (AVUM), 1st Battalion (General Support Aviation), 168th Aviation Regiment, at Bryant Army Heliport
      - Detachment 3, Company E (Forward Support), 1st Battalion (General Support Aviation), 168th Aviation Regiment, at Bryant Army Heliport
    - Detachment 1, Company B (Heavy Lift), 2nd Battalion (General Support Aviation), 211th Aviation Regiment, at Bryant Army Heliport (CH-47F Chinook)
      - Detachment 4, Headquarters and Headquarters Company, 2nd Battalion (General Support Aviation), 211th Aviation Regiment, at Bryant Army Heliport
      - Detachment 4, Company D (AVUM), 2nd Battalion (General Support Aviation), 211th Aviation Regiment, at Bryant Army Heliport
      - Detachment 4, Company E (Forward Support), 2nd Battalion (General Support Aviation), 211th Aviation Regiment, at Bryant Army Heliport
    - Detachment 1, Company G (MEDEVAC), 2nd Battalion (General Support Aviation), 211th Aviation Regiment, at Bryant Army Heliport (HH-60L Black Hawk)
    - Detachment 2, Company C, 3rd Battalion (Security & Support), 140th Aviation Regiment, at Bryant Army Heliport (UH-72A Lakota)
    - Company C, 2nd Battalion (Fixed Wing), 641st Aviation Regiment (Detachment 54, Operational Support Airlift Activity), at Elmendorf Air Force Base (C-12 Huron)
    - Detachment 3, Company B (AVIM), 777th Aviation Support Battalion, at Bryant Army Heliport
  - 207th Regiment, Multi-Functional Training Regiment, at Joint Base Elmendorf–Richardson

Aviation unit abbreviations: CAC — Command Aviation Company; MEDEVAC — Medical evacuation; AVUM — Aviation Unit Maintenance; AVIM — Aviation Intermediate Maintenance

== See also ==
- Alaska Naval Militia
- Alaska State Defense Force
