= Hawaii Army National Guard =

Component of the US Army and military of the state of Hawaii

- Hawaii Army National Guard DUI
- Country: United States
- Allegiance: Hawaii
- Branch: United States Army National Guard
- Type: ARNG Headquarters Command
- Part of: Hawaii National Guard
- Garrison/HQ: Honolulu, Oahu, Hawaii
- Motto: Ka Oihana Mamua
- Engagements: Hilo Massacre; Attack on Pearl Harbor; Iraq War
- Website: https://dod.hawaii.gov/hiarng/

Commanders
- Current commander: BG Moses Kaoiwi Jr.

Insignia
- Shoulder sleeve insignia

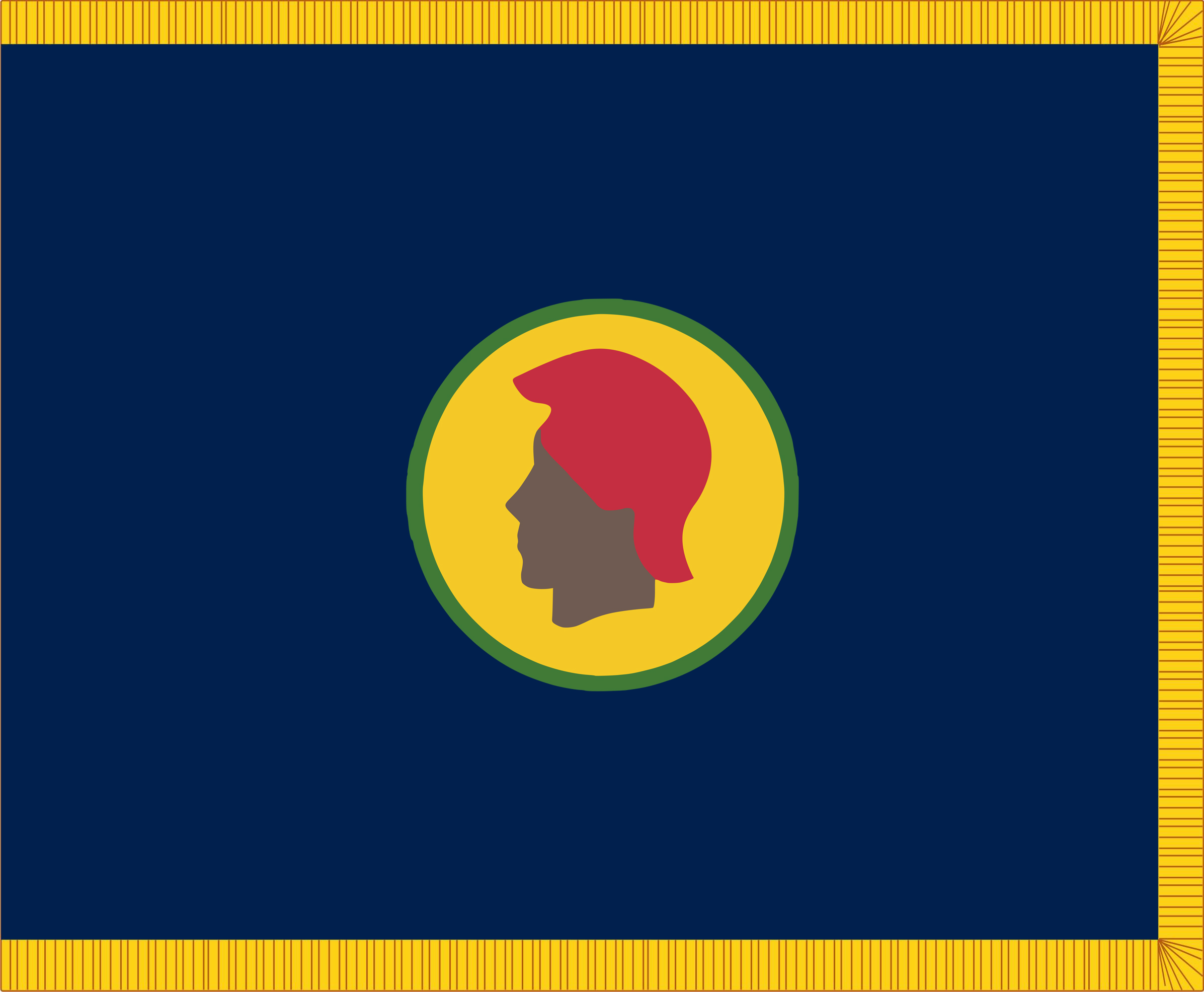
- Hawaii ARNG Headquarters Flag

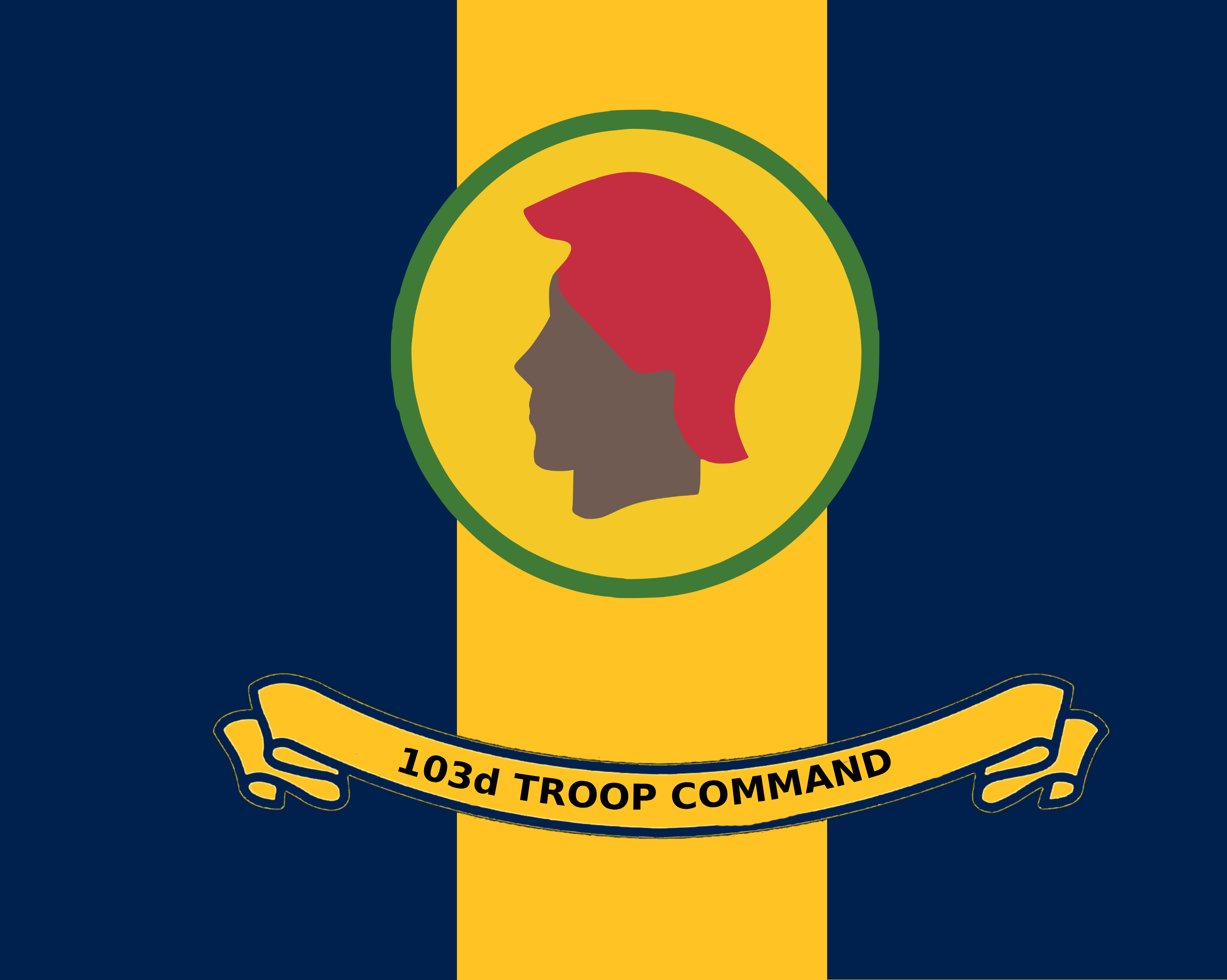
- Hawaii ARNG 103d Troop Command Flag

- Hawaii ARmy National Guard Crest

The Hawaii Army National Guard is a component of the United States Army and the United States National Guard. Nationwide, the Army National Guard comprises approximately one half of the US Army's available combat forces and approximately one third of its support organization. National coordination of various state National Guard units are maintained through the National Guard Bureau.

Hawaii Army National Guard units are trained and equipped as part of the United States Army.

== Organization ==
As of January 2026 the Hawaii Army National Guard consists of the following units:

- Joint Force Headquarters-Hawaii, Army Element, in Pearl City
  - Headquarters and Headquarters Company, Joint Force Headquarters-Hawaii, Army Element, in Pearl City
  - Hawaii Recruiting & Retention Battalion, in Kapolei
  - Hawaii Medical Detachment, in Kalaeloa
  - 93rd Civil Support Team (WMD), in Pearl City
  - Army Aviation Support Facility #1, at Wheeler Army Airfield
  - Army Aviation Support Facility #2, at General Lyman Field
  - Army Aviation Support Facility #3, at Kalaeloa Airfield
  - Unit Training Equipment Site #1, in Wahiawā
  - Combined Support Maintenance Shop #1, in Kapolei
  - Combined Support Maintenance Shop #2, in Hilo
  - Field Maintenance Shop #1, in Kapolei
  - Field Maintenance Shop #2, in Wahiawā
  - Field Maintenance Shop #3, in Kīhei
  - Field Maintenance Shop #5, in Hanapēpē
  - 29th Infantry Brigade Combat Team, in Kalaeloa
    - Headquarters and Headquarters Company, 29th Infantry Brigade Combat Team, in Kalaeloa
    - 1st Squadron, 299th Cavalry Regiment, in Hilo
      - Headquarters and Headquarters Troop, 1st Squadron, 299th Infantry Regiment, in Hilo
      - Troop A, 1st Squadron, 299th Infantry Regiment, in Kalaeloa
      - Troop B, 1st Squadron, 299th Infantry Regiment, in Kalaeloa
      - Troop C (Dismounted), 1st Squadron, 299th Infantry Regiment, in Hanapēpē
    - 1st Battalion, 158th Infantry Regiment, at Papago Park Military Reservation (AZ) — (Arizona Army National Guard)
    - 1st Battalion, 294th Infantry Regiment, in Barrigada (GU) — (Guam Army National Guard)
    - 1st Battalion, 297th Infantry Regiment, at Joint Base Elmendorf–Richardson (AK) — (Alaska Army National Guard)
    - 1st Battalion, 487th Field Artillery Regiment, in Mililani
      - Headquarters and Headquarters Battery, 1st Battalion, 487th Field Artillery Regiment
        - Detachment 2, Headquarters and Headquarters Battery, 1st Battalion, 487th Field Artillery Regiment, in Barrigada (GU)
      - Battery A, 1st Battalion, 487th Field Artillery Regiment
      - Battery B, 1st Battalion, 487th Field Artillery Regiment
      - Battery C, 1st Battalion, 487th Field Artillery Regiment
    - 227th Brigade Engineer Battalion, in Kapolei
      - Headquarters and Headquarters Company, 227th Brigade Engineer Battalion
      - Company A (Combat Engineer), 227th Brigade Engineer Battalion
      - Company B (Combat Engineer), 227th Brigade Engineer Battalion
      - Company C (Signal), 227th Brigade Engineer Battalion
      - Company D (Military Intelligence), 227th Brigade Engineer Battalion
    - 29th Brigade Support Battalion, in Honolulu
      - Headquarters and Headquarters Company, 29th Brigade Support Battalion
      - Company A (Distribution), 29th Brigade Support Battalion
      - Company B (Maintenance), 29th Brigade Support Battalion
      - Company C (Medical), 29th Brigade Support Battalion
      - Company D (Forward Support), 29th Brigade Support Battalion — attached to 1st Squadron, 299th Cavalry Regiment
      - Company E (Forward Support), 29th Brigade Support Battalion — attached to 227th Brigade Engineer Battalion
      - Company F (Forward Support), 29th Brigade Support Battalion — attached to 1st Battalion, 487th Field Artillery Regiment
      - Company G (Forward Support), 29th Brigade Support Battalion, in Mesa (AZ) — attached to 1st Battalion, 158th Infantry Regiment (Arizona Army National Guard)
      - Company H (Forward Support), 29th Brigade Support Battalion, in Barrigada (GU) — attached to 1st Battalion, 294th Infantry Regiment (Guam Army National Guard)
      - Company J (Forward Support), 29th Brigade Support Battalion, at Joint Base Elmendorf–Richardson (AK) — attached to 1st Battalion, 297th Infantry Regiment (Alaska Army National Guard)
  - 103rd Troop Command, in Pearl City
    - Headquarters and Headquarters Company 103rd Troop Command, in Pearl City
    - 50th Quartermaster Platoon (Field Feeding), in Pearl City
    - 111th Army Band, in Pearl City
    - 117th Mobile Public Affairs Detachment, in Pearl City
    - 230th Engineer Company (Vertical Construction Company), in Kīhei
      - Detachment 1, 230th Engineer Company (Vertical Construction Company), in Kaunakakai
      - Detachment 2, 230th Engineer Company (Vertical Construction Company), in Anaconda (MT) — (Montana Army National Guard)
    - 297th Engineer Detachment (Fire Fighting Team — Fire Truck), in Pearl City
    - 1950th Support Detachment (Contracting Team), in Pearl City
    - Detachment 1, Company G (MEDEVAC), 3rd Battalion (General Support Aviation), 126th Aviation Regiment, at Kalaeloa Airfield (HH-60M Black Hawk)
    - Detachment 1, Company G (MEDEVAC), 1st Battalion (General Support Aviation), 189th Aviation Regiment, at Kalaeloa Airfield (HH-60M Black Hawk)
      - Detachment 4, Headquarters and Headquarters Company, 1st Battalion (General Support Aviation), 189th Aviation Regiment, at Kalaeloa Airfield
      - Detachment 4, Company D (AVUM), 1st Battalion (General Support Aviation), 189th Aviation Regiment, at Kalaeloa Airfield
      - Detachment 4, Company E (Forward Support), 1st Battalion (General Support Aviation), 189th Aviation Regiment, at Kalaeloa Airfield
    - Company C, 1st Battalion (Assault), 183rd Aviation Regiment, at General Lyman Field (UH-60M Black Hawk)
      - Detachment 1, Headquarters and Headquarters Company, 1st Battalion (Assault), 183rd Aviation Regiment, at General Lyman Field
      - Detachment 1, Company D (AVUM), 1st Battalion (Assault), 183rd Aviation Regiment, at General Lyman Field
      - Detachment 1, Company E (Forward Support), 1st Battalion (Assault), 183rd Aviation Regiment, at General Lyman Field
    - Company B (Heavy Lift), 2nd Battalion (General Support Aviation), 211th Aviation Regiment, at Wheeler Army Airfield (CH-47F Chinook)
      - Detachment 1, Headquarters and Headquarters Company, 2nd Battalion (General Support Aviation), 211th Aviation Regiment, at Wheeler Army Airfield
      - Detachment 1, Company D (AVUM), 2nd Battalion (General Support Aviation), 211th Aviation Regiment, at Wheeler Army Airfield
      - Detachment 1, Company E (Forward Support), 2nd Battalion (General Support Aviation), 211th Aviation Regiment, at Wheeler Army Airfield
    - Detachment 1, Company A, 3rd Battalion (Security & Support), 140th Aviation Regiment, at Wheeler Army Airfield (UH-72A Lakota)
    - Detachment 3, Company C, 2nd Battalion (Fixed Wing), 641st Aviation Regiment (Detachment 55, Operational Support Airlift Activity), at Wheeler Army Airfield (C-26E Metroliner)
    - Company B (AVIM), 777th Aviation Support Battalion, at Wheeler Army Airfield
    - Company B (Ground Support), 1109th Theater Aviation Sustainment Maintenance Group, in Pearl City
  - 298th Multi-Functional Training Regiment, in Waimanalo
    - 1st Battalion, 298th Multi-Functional Training Regiment
    - 2nd Battalion, 298th Multi-Functional Training Regiment
    - Ordnance Training Company, Regional Training Site-Maintenance

Aviation unit abbreviations: MEDEVAC — Medical evacuation; AVUM — Aviation Unit Maintenance; AVIM — Aviation Intermediate Maintenance

== Duties ==
National Guard units can be mobilized at any time by presidential order to supplement regular armed forces, and upon declaration of a state of emergency by the governor of the state in which they serve. Unlike Army Reserve members, National Guard members cannot be mobilized individually (except through voluntary transfers and Temporary DutY Assignments TDY), but only as part of their respective units. However, there has been a significant number of individual activations to support military operations (2001-?); the legality of this policy is a major issue within the National Guard.

=== Active Duty Callups ===
For much of the final decades of the twentieth century, National Guard personnel typically served "One weekend a month, two weeks a year", with a portion working for the Guard in a full-time capacity. The current forces formation plans of the US Army call for the typical National Guard unit (or national guardsman) to serve one year of active duty for every three years of service. More specifically, current Department of Defense policy is that no guardsman will be involuntarily activated for a total of more than 24 months (cumulative) in one six-year enlistment period (this policy is due to change 1 August 2007, the new policy states that soldiers will be given 24 months between deployments of no more than 24 months, individual states have differing policies).

== History ==
=== Kingdom ===
The earliest forerunner of the Hawaii Army National Guard was the Honolulu Rifles a militia formed in 1854. In 1887 it was certified as a paramilitary.

=== Republic ===
On January 27, 1893, following the Overthrow of the Hawaiian Kingdom, the National Guard of Hawaii was formed largely adopting men from the Honolulu Rifles. The first action as a national guard was during the Leper War a pyyrhic victory.

=== Territory ===
On August 12, 1898 National Guard of Hawaii was converted into the Hawaii National Guard. In 1938 members of the 2nd BN, 299 INF RGT of the Hawaii National Guard unit in Hilo aided striking workers against government authorities during the protest that became known as the Hilo Massacre. In 1940, with the 298th INF RGT and 299th INF RGT of the Hawaii National Guard being federalized, the governor and Adjutant General had minimal troops available to carry out Territorial duties.

After the attack on Pearl Harbor, the Hawaii Territorial Guard was created to serve as the stateside replacement for the National Guard. As a State Defense Force, the Hawaii Territorial Guard was not subject to federalization or deployment, but rather answered only to the governor. In January 1942, due to suspicions of their loyalty, Hawaii Territorial Guardsman of Japanese ancestry were dismissed. However, the Japanese members of the Hawaii National Guard who were on Active Duty with the 298th and 299th INF RGTs were retained until June 1942, when they were removed and placed in the Hawaiian Provisional Battalion. This unit would soon become the famed 100th Infantry Battalion.

=== Historic units ===
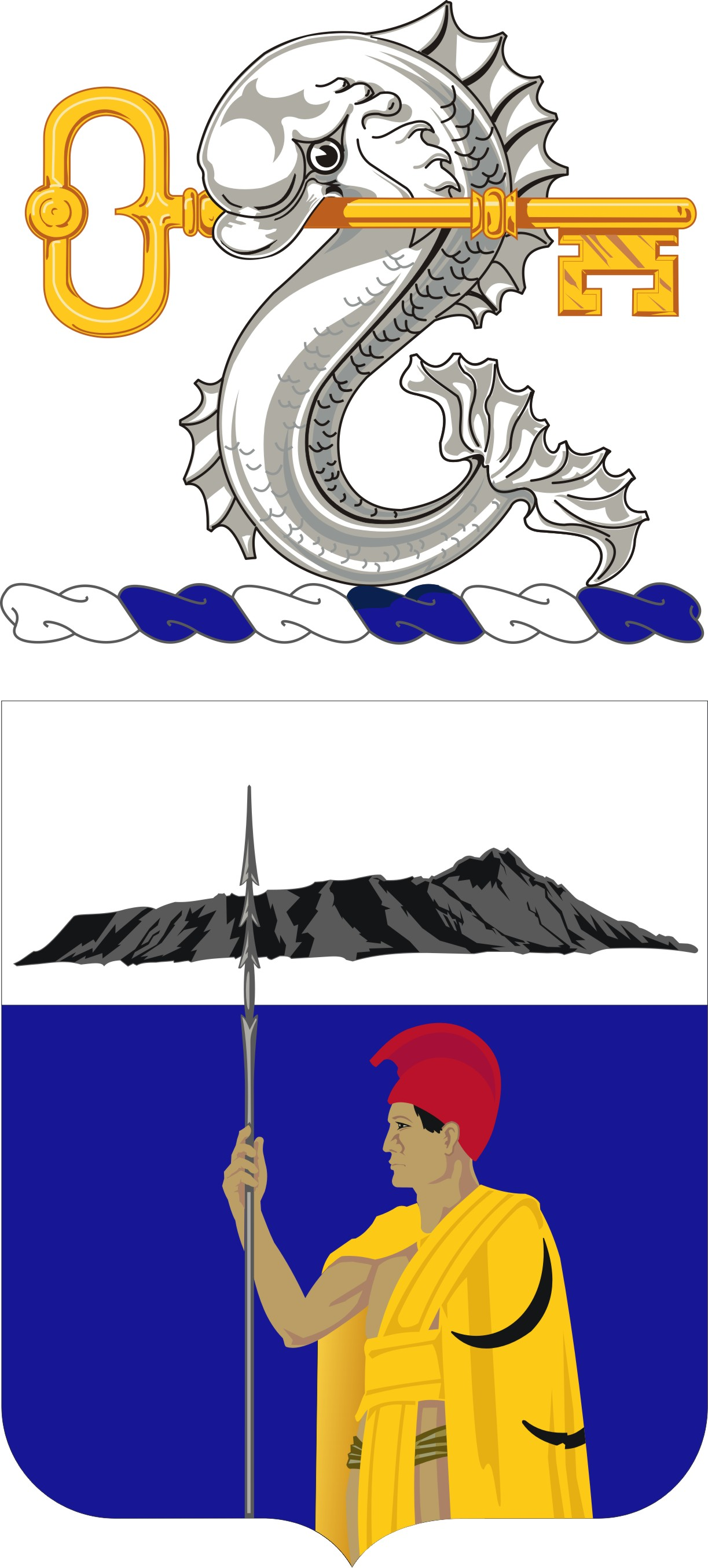

298th Infantry Regiment - The 298th Infantry was organized as the 1st Regiment, National Guard of Hawaii from 1893-95 at Honolulu. It was redesignated as the 1st Hawaiian Infantry Regiment and mobilized into federal service during World War I at Fort Shafter, Hawaii from 1918-19. In 1923 it was redesignated as the 298th Infantry Regiment. Called to Federal service on 15 October 1940, the 298th Infantry was assigned to the 25th Division on 1 October 1941. On 7 December 1941 the 298th Infantry came under fire and took casualties during the Japanese attack on Pearl Harbor. On 23 July 1942 the 298th Regiment was reassigned to the 24th Infantry Division. On 12 June 1943 the 298th Infantry was relieved from assignment to the 24th Division and was designated as a separate infantry regiment. It was assigned to the U.S. Army Central Pacific and participated in the Central and Western Pacific, Leyte and Ryukyu campaigns. The regiment was released from federal service on 10 April 1945 in Hawaii. On 8 January 1957 the 298th Infantry was reorganized and redesignated as the 298th Antiaircraft Artillery Group. It was further redesignated as the 298th Artillery Group (Air Defense) on 15 November 1961. On 22 January 1972 the 298th was reorganized and redesignated as the 298th Field Depot with station at Wahiawa, Hawaii. On 1 June 1976 the 298th Field Depot was inactivated with its headquarters and headquarters company being consolidated with headquarters and headquarters detachment, Hawaii Army National Guard. On 16 August 1997, a new 298th Regiment not related by lineage to the original 298th Infantry Regiment, was constituted as a Regional Training Institute for the Hawaii Army National Guard at Waimanalo, Hawaii. During COVID-19, the Medical Detachment (MED DET) helped distribute vaccines, and successfully executed its Health Service Support and Force Health Protection missions, which aimed to maintain high levels of medical readiness. They conducted Periodic Health Assessments, Dental Examinations, Hearing Test, Profiles, Vision Readiness Screenings, Immunizations, Flight Physicals, Behavior Health Support, and Case Management Support.

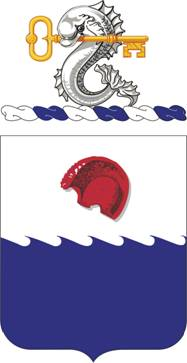
- 299th Infantry Regiment
