= Hawaii National Guard =

Hawaiian defence force

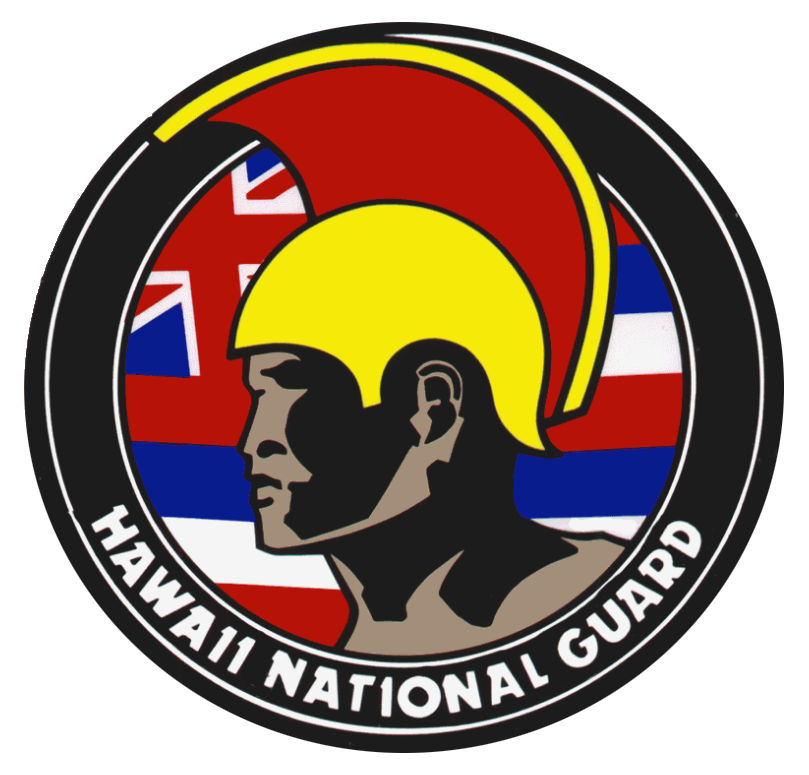
Hawaii National Guard

The Hawaii National Guard consists of the Hawaii Army National Guard and the Hawaii Air National Guard. The Constitution of the United States specifically charges the National Guard with dual federal and state missions. Those functions range from limited actions during non-emergency situations to full scale law enforcement under martial law when local law enforcement officials can no longer maintain civil control.

The National Guard may be called into federal service in response to a call by the president or Congress. When National Guard troops are called to federal service, the president serves as the commander-in-chief. The federal mission assigned to the National Guard is: "To provide properly trained and equipped units for prompt mobilization for war, National emergency or as otherwise needed."

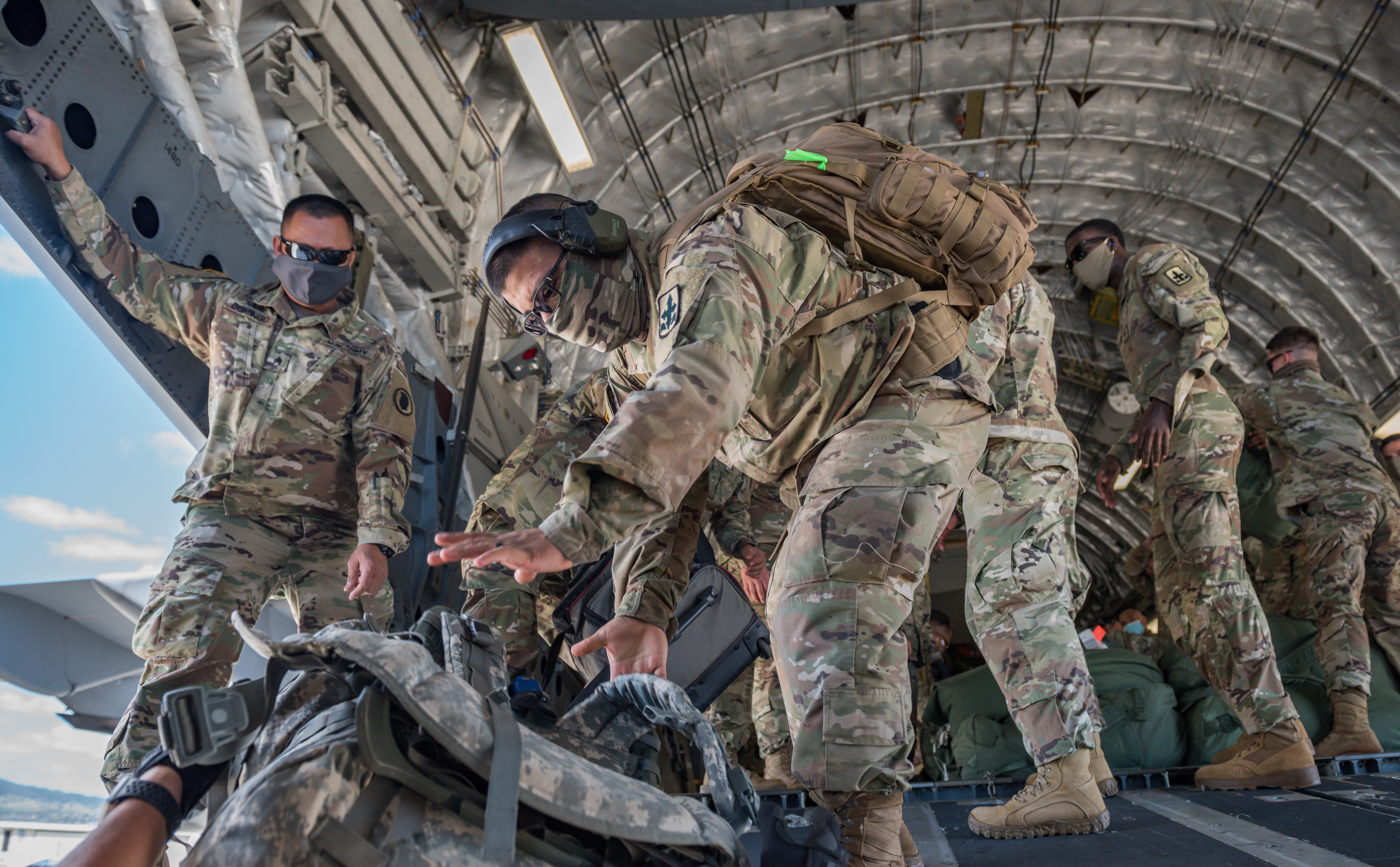
Hawaii National Guard members load gear onto a C-17 Globemaster while deploying in response to the 2020 coronavirus pandemic, Kalaeloa, Hawaii, April 15, 2020

When not federalized, the state's governor is the guard's commander-in-chief, and may call individuals or units of the Hawaii National Guard into state service during emergencies or to assist in special situations which lend themselves to use of the National Guard. The state mission assigned to the National Guard is: "To provide trained and disciplined forces for domestic emergencies or as otherwise provided by state law." The State Defense Force (SDF) is a military entity authorized by both the State Code of Hawaii and Executive Order. The SDF is the state's authorized militia and assumes the state mission of the Hawaii National Guard in the event the Guard is mobilized. The SDF comprises retired active and reserve military personnel and selected professional persons who volunteer their time and talents in further service to their state. Hawaii's SDF, the Hawaii Territorial Guard, was activated during World War II to aid in the defense of the territory, but has been inactive since 1947.

== Predecessor ==
Prior to the archipelago being annexed as the Territory of Hawaii in 1898, the Provisional Government of Hawaii had established the National Guard of Hawaii. After annexation, the force entered the U.S. Army National Guard system and became part of the Hawaii Army National Guard.

== Hawaii National Guard State Awards ==
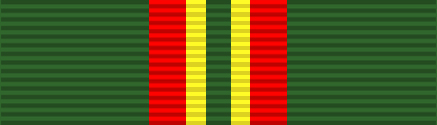
- Hawaii National Guard 1968 Federal Service
- Hawaii Active Duty Basic Training
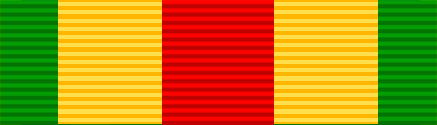
- Hawaii National Guard Commendation Medal
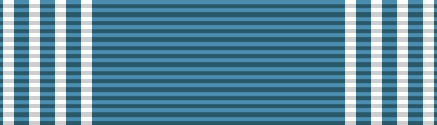
- Hawaii National Guard Distinguished Service Order
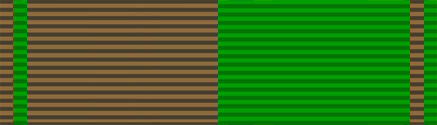
- Hawaii National Guard Medal for Merit
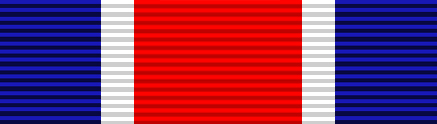
- Hawaii National Guard Operation Kokua
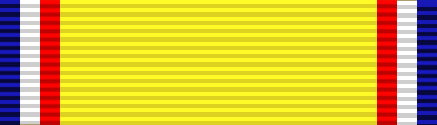
- Hawaii Recruiting Ribbon
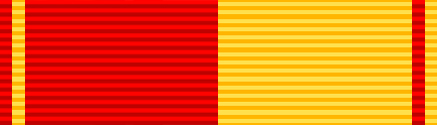
- Hawaii National Guard Service Medal
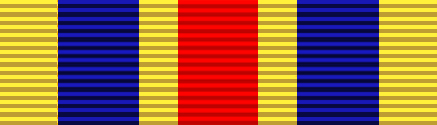
- Hawaii National Guard State Active Duty

== Notable members ==
Several former members of Hawaii's delegation to the U.S. House of Representatives served in the Hawaii National Guard, including Mark Takai, Tulsi Gabbard, and Kai Kahele.
