= 297th Regional Support Group =

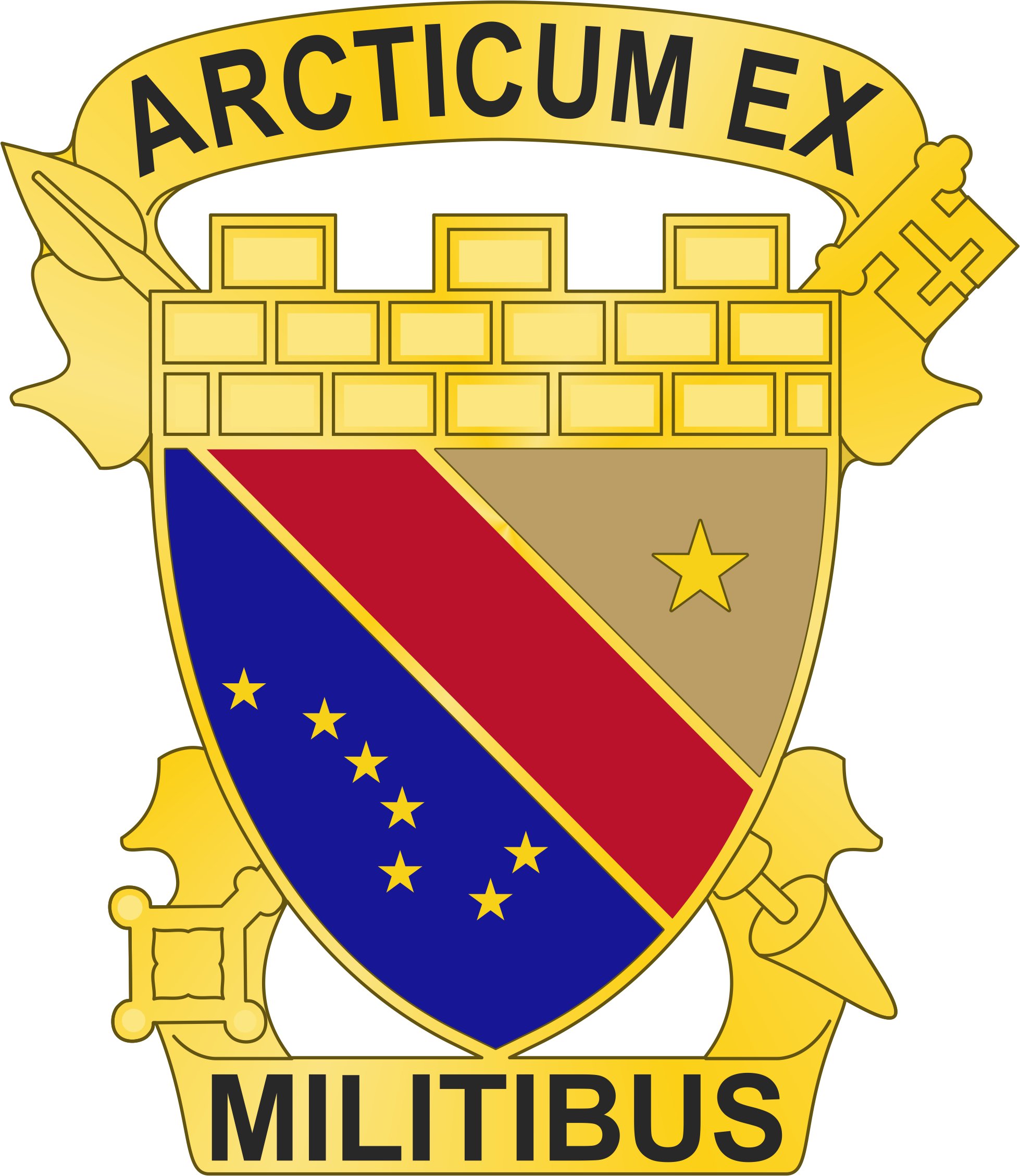
- DUI of the 297th RSG
- Active: 2016-present
- Country: United States
- Branch: Army National Guard
- Role: Support
- Size: Brigade
- Garrison/HQ: Camp Denali, Anchorage, Alaska
- Motto: Arcticum Ex Militibus (Soldiers of the Arrtic)
- Website: https://www.facebook.com/297RSG/

Commanders
- Current commander: Col. Michele Edwards
- Command Sergeant Major: CSM Ryan Weimer

Insignia
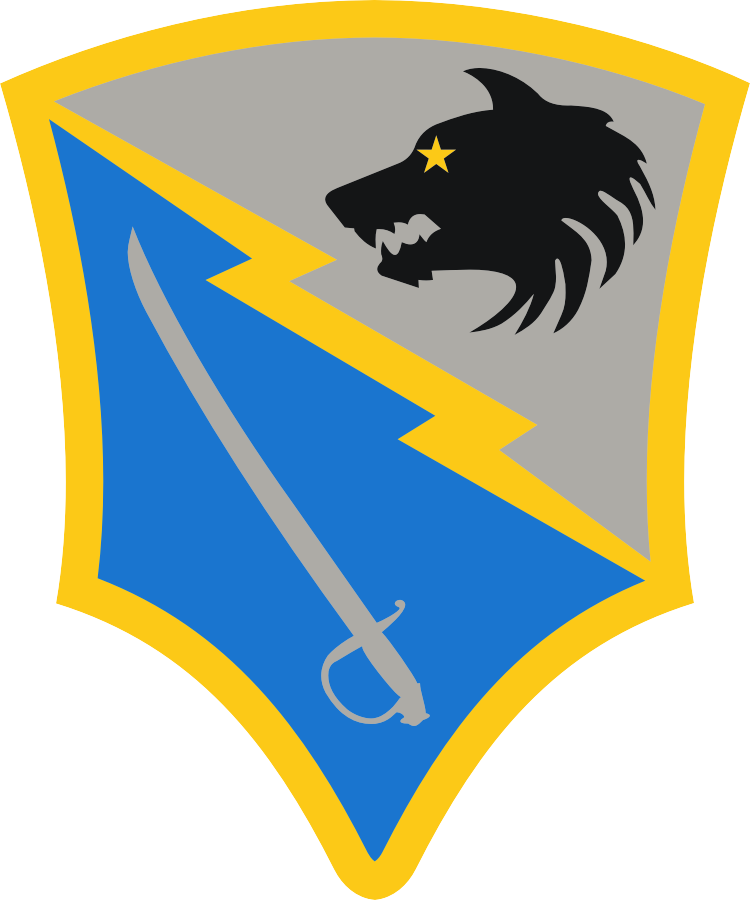
- Former SSI of the 297th Battlefield Surveillance Brigade

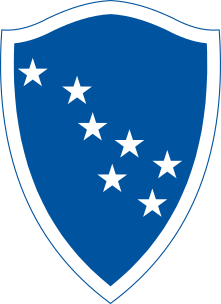
- Current SSI

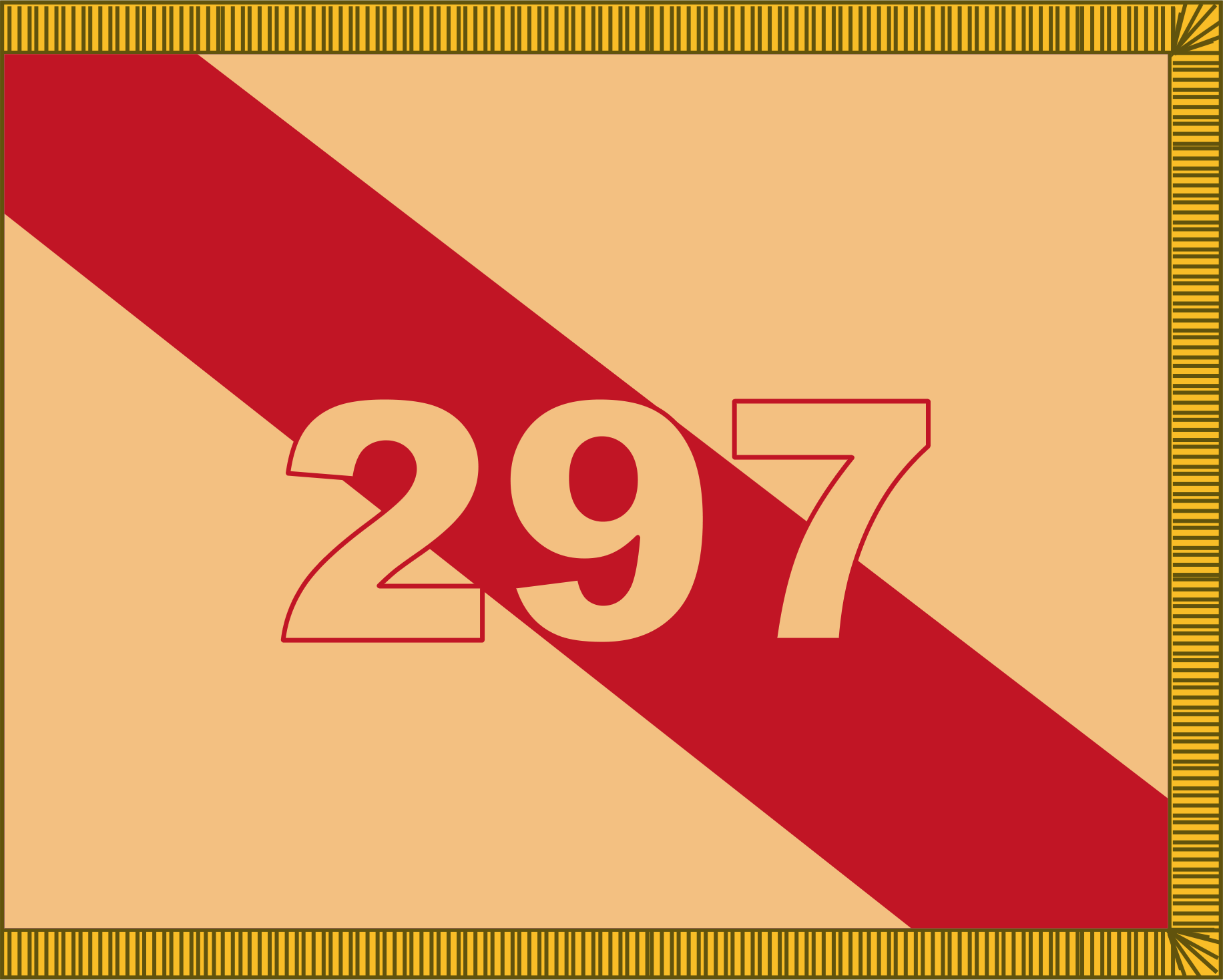
- 297th Regional Support Group Flag

The 297th Regional Support Group (297th RSG)is a unit of the Alaska National Guard since 2016 when the AKARNG redesignated the 297th Battlefield Surveillance Brigade as the 297th RSG.

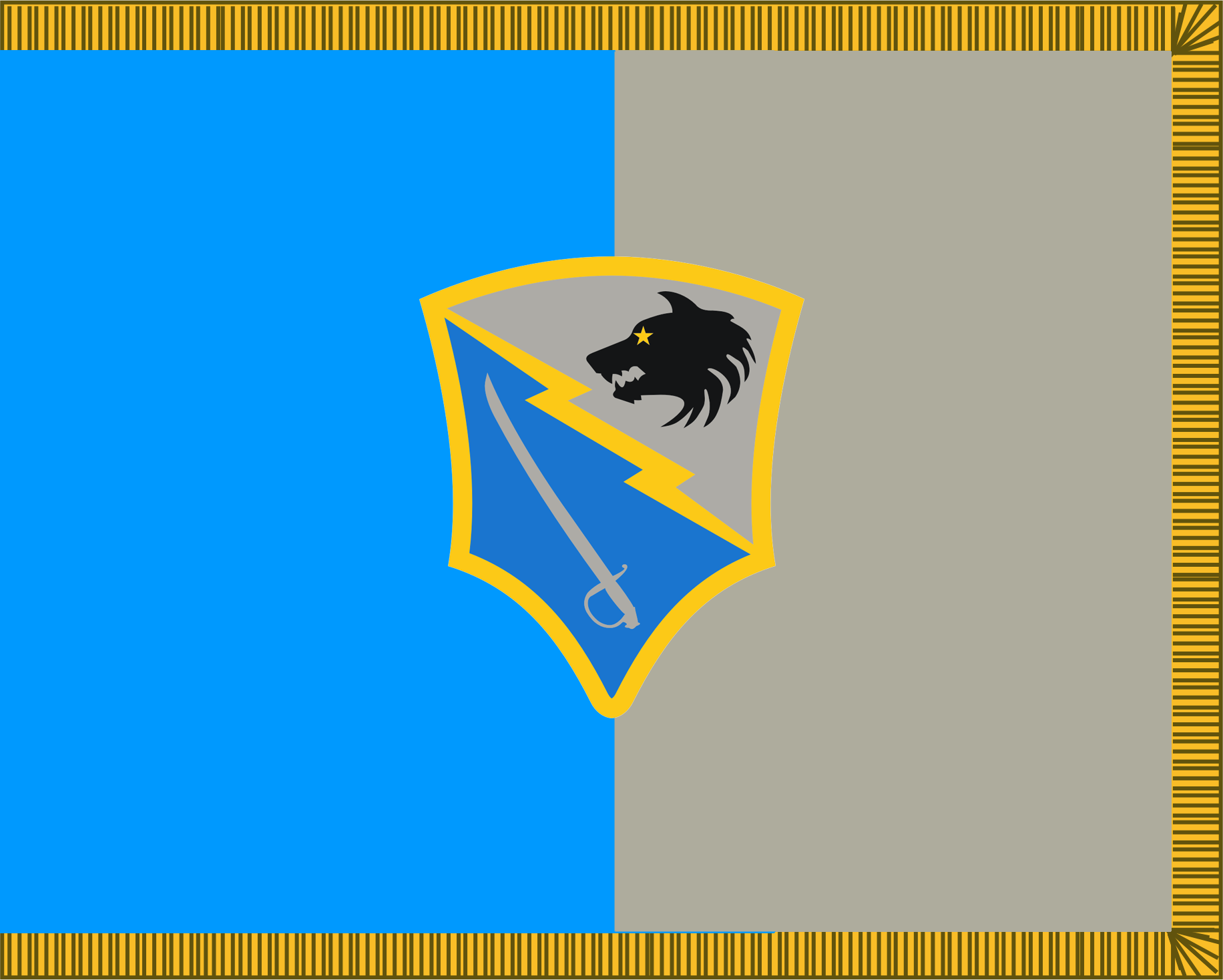
297th Battlefield Surveillance Brigade Flag

The unit's lineage originates in the 207th Infantry Group that was reorganized into the 297th BFSB in 2008. Originally, the 207th Infantry Group was constituted on 8 January 1964 in the Army National Guard as the 38th Special Forces Detachment. It was federally recognized on 20 January 1964 at Anchorage, Alaska. The 38th Special Forces Company was reorganized and redesignated the 207th Infantry Group (Arctic Reconnaissance) by Permanent Orders 10-1 of October 1, 1976. The 297th BfSB became the 297th Regional Support Group on September 1, 2016.

In 2025, soldiers of the group deployed to 10 bases across Poland, Latvia, Lithuania and Estonia.

== Organization ==
- 297th Regional Support Group, at Joint Base Elmendorf–Richardson
  - Headquarters and Headquarters Company, 297th Regional Support Group, at Joint Base Elmendorf–Richardson
  - 49th Adjutant General Detachment (Theater Gateway — Personnel Accountability Team), at Joint Base Elmendorf–Richardson
  - 134th Public Affairs Detachment, at Joint Base Elmendorf–Richardson
  - 208th Engineer Detachment (Construction Management Team), at Joint Base Elmendorf–Richardson
  - 297th Military Police Detachment, in Wasilla
  - 910th Engineer Company (Engineer Support Company), at Joint Base Elmendorf–Richardson
