= 29th Infantry Brigade Combat Team =

- 29th Infantry Brigade Combat Team shoulder sleeve insignia
- Active: 17 November 1947–1 October 1995 (multiple designations); 1 October 1995–1 September 2006 (29th Infantry Bge.); 1 September 2006–present (29th IBCT)
- Country: United States
- Allegiance: Hawaii Army National Guard
- Branch: United States Army National Guard
- Type: Infantry
- Size: Brigade Combat Team
- Part of: 40th Infantry Division
- Garrison/HQ: Kalaeloa, Hawaii
- Engagements: Global War on Terrorism; Afghanistan; Transition I; Operation Iraqi Freedom; Iraqi Governance; National Resolution

Commanders
- Current commander: COL David R. Hatcher II
- Command Sergeant Major: CSM Brandon I. Kumalae

Insignia
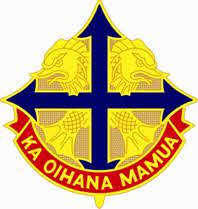
- Distinctive unit insignia

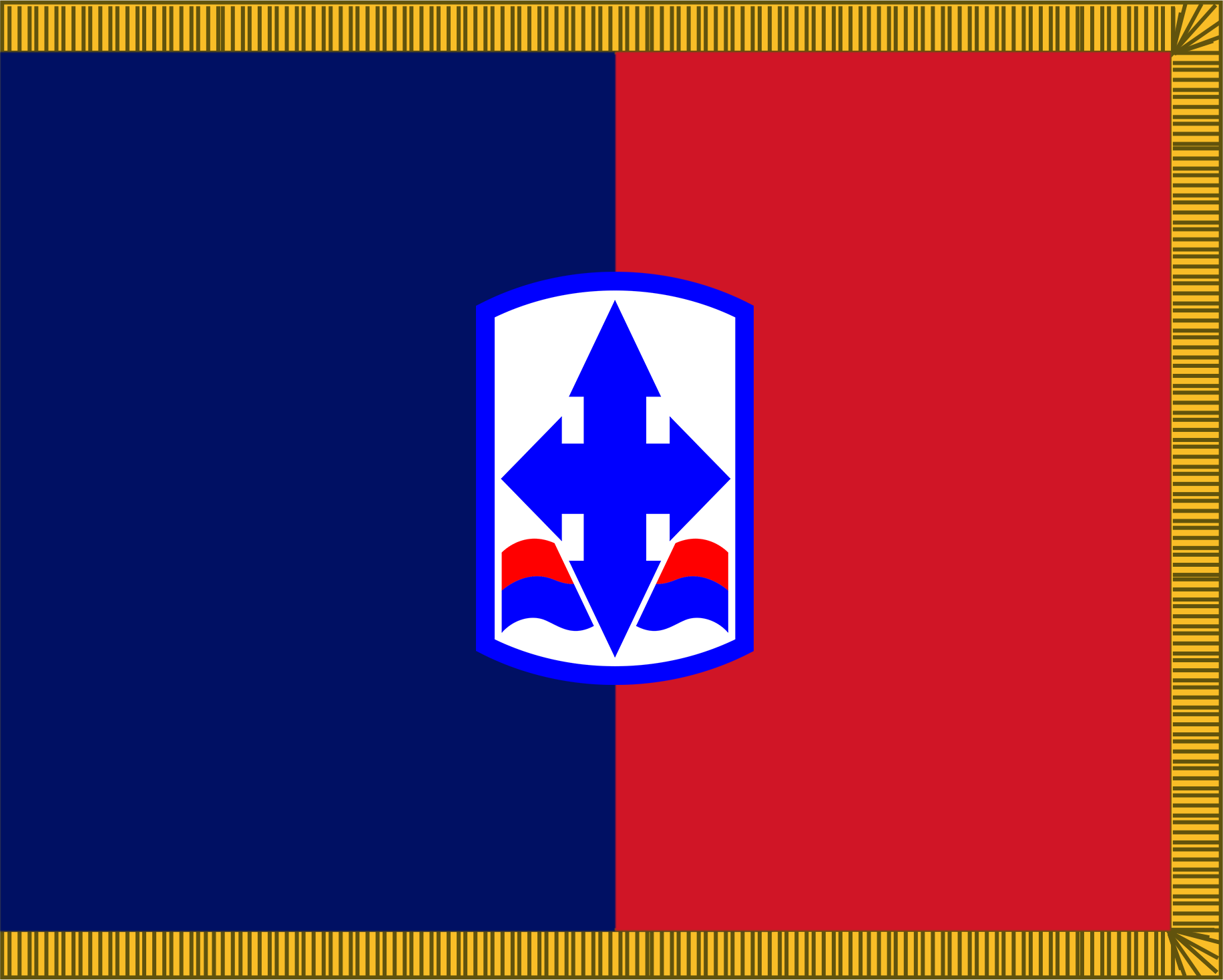
- 29th Infantry Brigade Flag

The 29th Infantry Brigade Combat Team is an infantry brigade combat team of the United States Army National Guard of Hawaii. It traces its origins to the 29th Infantry Brigade (Separate) originally formed in the Hawaii Army National Guard in 1959. The current name and Table of Organisation and Equipment, adopting the new "Brigade Combat Team" structure, was adopted in 2006.

== History ==
The 29th Infantry Brigade headquarters was converted and redesignated from the 120th Signal Support Company on 15 January 1959 at Fort Ruger. A separate brigade, the 29th replaced the 299th Regimental Combat Team under the Pentomic reorganization as the major unit of the Hawaii Army National Guard. The brigade included the 1st and 2nd Battle Groups of the 299th Infantry, formed from the 299th Regimental Combat Team, and the 284th Transportation Company (Light Truck). The 120th Signal Support Company, constituted on 15 September 1953, had been organized and Federally recognized on 4 January 1954 at Fort Ruger. The brigade conducted its first two-week summer training at Schofield Barracks between 13 and 27 June 1959. During the Vietnam War, the brigade was ordered into active Federal service on 13 May 1968 and released from Federal service on 12 December 1969.

The 29th Infantry Brigade Combat Team is the largest unit in the Hawaii Army National Guard (HI ARNG). Since 1995, the brigade has been one of the nation's 15 enhanced readiness brigades. This distinction means that the 29th must be trained and equipped to deploy within 90 days of a federal call-up. The brigade has units located on the islands of Hawaii, Maui, Oahu, Molokai, and Kauai, and in the states of Arizona, and California.

The Brigade's Headquarters and Headquarters Company, 229th Military Intelligence Company, and 29th Support Battalion are located on Oahu at its Kalaeloa facilities, formerly known as Barbers Point Naval Air Station. The bulk of the 227th Engineer Company's heavy engineering equipment which is located in the Hawaii Army National Guard Pearl City complex on Oahu. A combat engineering detachment is situated in the community of Keaau on the island of Hawaii. The brigade's 1st Battalion, 487th Field Artillery can be found in Wahiawa in Central Oahu.

The units of the brigade's 1st Squadron, 299th Cavalry, are located in communities throughout the state. The battalion's headquarters and headquarters company is located in Hilo, Hawaii, with a scout platoon detached to Kaunakakai, Molokai. The bulk of the battalion's Company A is located on Kauai in Kapaa, with a detachment in Hanapepe. Company B of the battalion is similarly split between the communities of Kealakekua and Honokaa on the island of Hawaii. Companies C and D are located in Kahului, Maui, and Wahiawa, Oahu, respectively.

On 20 July 2004 more than 2,100 soldiers were ordered to report for active duty 16 August 2004, about a month earlier than expected, to begin preparations for a year of combat duty in Iraq. With six months of training time on the mainland and at least a year in Iraq, the Hawaii soldiers were to be away 18 months. By late February 2005 the 29th Brigade replaced the 81st Brigade of the Washington Army National Guard, whose major elements were north of Baghdad in Balad.

The brigade returned to the United States between late December 2005 and early January 2006. It was demobilized in March 2006. After returning from Iraq, the brigade became the modular 29th Infantry Brigade Combat Team.

On 16 October 2016, a ceremony was held in Joint Base Elmendorf-Richardson, AK to activate 1st Battalion, 297th Infantry Regiment (AK ARNG). This new battalion was attached to the 29th IBCT with an effective date of 1 September 2016.

== Organization 2025 ==
- 29th Infantry Brigade Combat Team, in Kalaeloa (HI) (Hawaii Army National Guard)
  - Headquarters and Headquarters Company, 29th Infantry Brigade Combat Team, in Kalaeloa (HI)
  - 1st Squadron, 299th Cavalry Regiment, in Hilo (HI) (Hawaii Army National Guard)
    - Headquarters and Headquarters Troop, 1st Squadron, 299th Infantry Regiment, in Hilo (HI)
    - Troop A, 1st Squadron, 299th Infantry Regiment, in Kalaeloa (HI)
    - Troop B, 1st Squadron, 299th Infantry Regiment, in Kalaeloa (HI)
    - Troop C (Dismounted), 1st Squadron, 299th Infantry Regiment, in Hanapēpē (HI)
  - 1st Battalion, 158th Infantry Regiment, at Papago Park Military Reservation (AZ) (Arizona Army National Guard)
    - Headquarters and Headquarters Company, 1st Battalion, 158th Infantry Regiment, at Papago Park Military Reservation (AZ)
    - Company A, 1st Battalion, 158th Infantry Regiment, in Tucson (AZ)
    - Company B, 1st Battalion, 158th Infantry Regiment, in Florence (AZ)
    - Company C, 1st Battalion, 158th Infantry Regiment, in Prescott (AZ)
    - Company D (Weapons), 1st Battalion, 158th Infantry Regiment, in Buckeye (AZ)
  - 1st Battalion, 294th Infantry Regiment, in Barrigada (GU) (Guam Army National Guard)
    - Headquarters and Headquarters Company, 1st Battalion, 294th Infantry Regiment
    - Company A, 1st Battalion, 294th Infantry Regiment
    - Company B, 1st Battalion, 294th Infantry Regiment
    - Company C, 1st Battalion, 294th Infantry Regiment
    - Company D (Weapons), 1st Battalion, 294th Infantry Regiment
  - 1st Battalion, 297th Infantry Regiment, at Joint Base Elmendorf–Richardson (AK) (Alaska Army National Guard)
    - Headquarters and Headquarters Company, 1st Battalion, 297th Infantry Regiment
    - Company A, 1st Battalion, 297th Infantry Regiment
    - Company B, 1st Battalion, 297th Infantry Regiment
    - Company C, 1st Battalion, 297th Infantry Regiment, in Afton (WY) (Wyoming Army National Guard)
      - Detachment 1, Company C, 1st Battalion, 297th Infantry Regiment, in Evanston (WY)
    - Company D (Weapons), 1st Battalion, 297th Infantry Regiment, in Laramie (WY) (Wyoming Army National Guard)
  - 1st Battalion, 487th Field Artillery Regiment, in Mililani (HI) (Hawaii Army National Guard)
    - Headquarters and Headquarters Battery, 1st Battalion, 487th Field Artillery Regiment
      - Detachment 2, Headquarters and Headquarters Battery, 1st Battalion, 487th Field Artillery Regiment, in Barrigada (GU)
    - Battery A, 1st Battalion, 487th Field Artillery Regiment
    - Battery B, 1st Battalion, 487th Field Artillery Regiment
    - Battery C, 1st Battalion, 487th Field Artillery Regiment
  - 227th Brigade Engineer Battalion, in Kapolei (HI) (Hawaii Army National Guard)
    - Headquarters and Headquarters Company, 227th Brigade Engineer Battalion
    - Company A (Combat Engineer), 227th Brigade Engineer Battalion
    - Company B (Combat Engineer), 227th Brigade Engineer Battalion
    - Company C (Signal), 227th Brigade Engineer Battalion
    - Company D (Military Intelligence), 227th Brigade Engineer Battalion
  - 29th Brigade Support Battalion, in Honolulu (HI) (Hawaii Army National Guard)
    - Headquarters and Headquarters Company, 29th Brigade Support Battalion
    - Company A (Distribution), 29th Brigade Support Battalion
    - Company B (Maintenance), 29th Brigade Support Battalion
    - Company C (Medical), 29th Brigade Support Battalion
    - Company D (Forward Support), 29th Brigade Support Battalion — attached to 1st Squadron, 299th Cavalry Regiment
    - Company E (Forward Support), 29th Brigade Support Battalion — attached to 227th Brigade Engineer Battalion
    - Company F (Forward Support), 29th Brigade Support Battalion — attached to 1st Battalion, 487th Field Artillery Regiment
    - Company G (Forward Support), 29th Brigade Support Battalion, in Mesa (AZ) — attached to 1st Battalion, 158th Infantry Regiment (Arizona Army National Guard)
    - Company H (Forward Support), 29th Brigade Support Battalion, in Barrigada (GU) — attached to 1st Battalion, 294th Infantry Regiment (Guam Army National Guard)
    - Company J (Forward Support), 29th Brigade Support Battalion, at Joint Base Elmendorf–Richardson (AK) — attached to 1st Battalion, 297th Infantry Regiment (Alaska Army National Guard)
