= Bryant Army Heliport =

Bryant Army Airfield
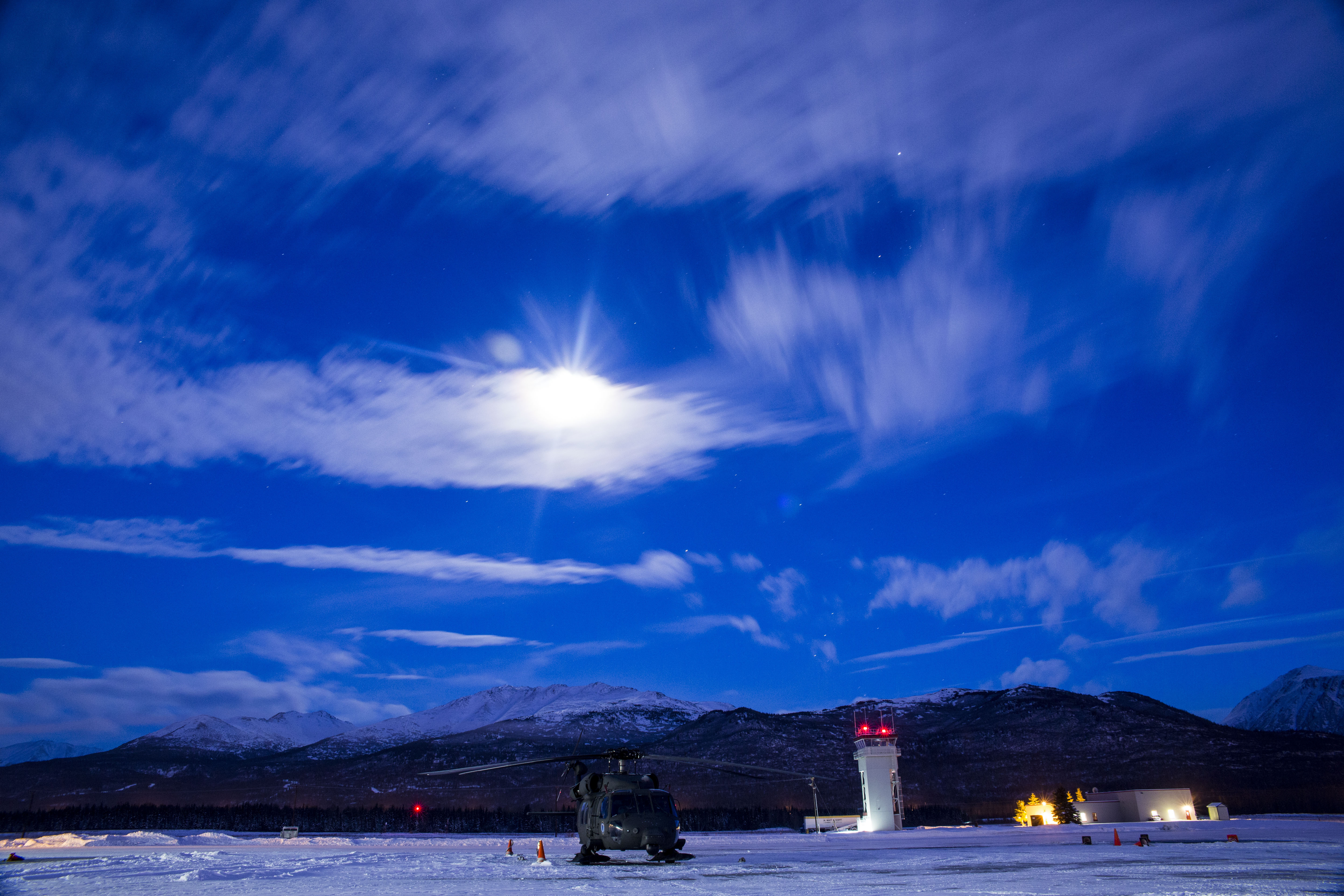
- IATA: FRN; ICAO: PAFR; FAA LID: FRN

Summary
- Airport type: Military
- Owner: U.S. Government
- Location: Fort Richardson / Anchorage, Alaska
- Elevation AMSL: 378 ft (115 m)
- Coordinates: 61°15′45″N 149°39′17″W

Map
- Location of airport in Alaska

Runways
Direction	Length		Surface
Direction	ft	m	Surface
16/34	4,086	1,273	Asphalt
- Source: Federal Aviation Administration

Bryant Army Airport (IATA: FRN, ICAO: PAFR, FAA LID: FRN), also known historically as Bryant Army Airfield, is a U.S. Army Airfield located at Fort Richardson, near the city of Anchorage in the U.S. state of Alaska.

It has one runway designated 17/35 with a 4,086 x 100 ft (1,273 x 30 m) asphalt surface.
