= 297th Infantry Regiment =

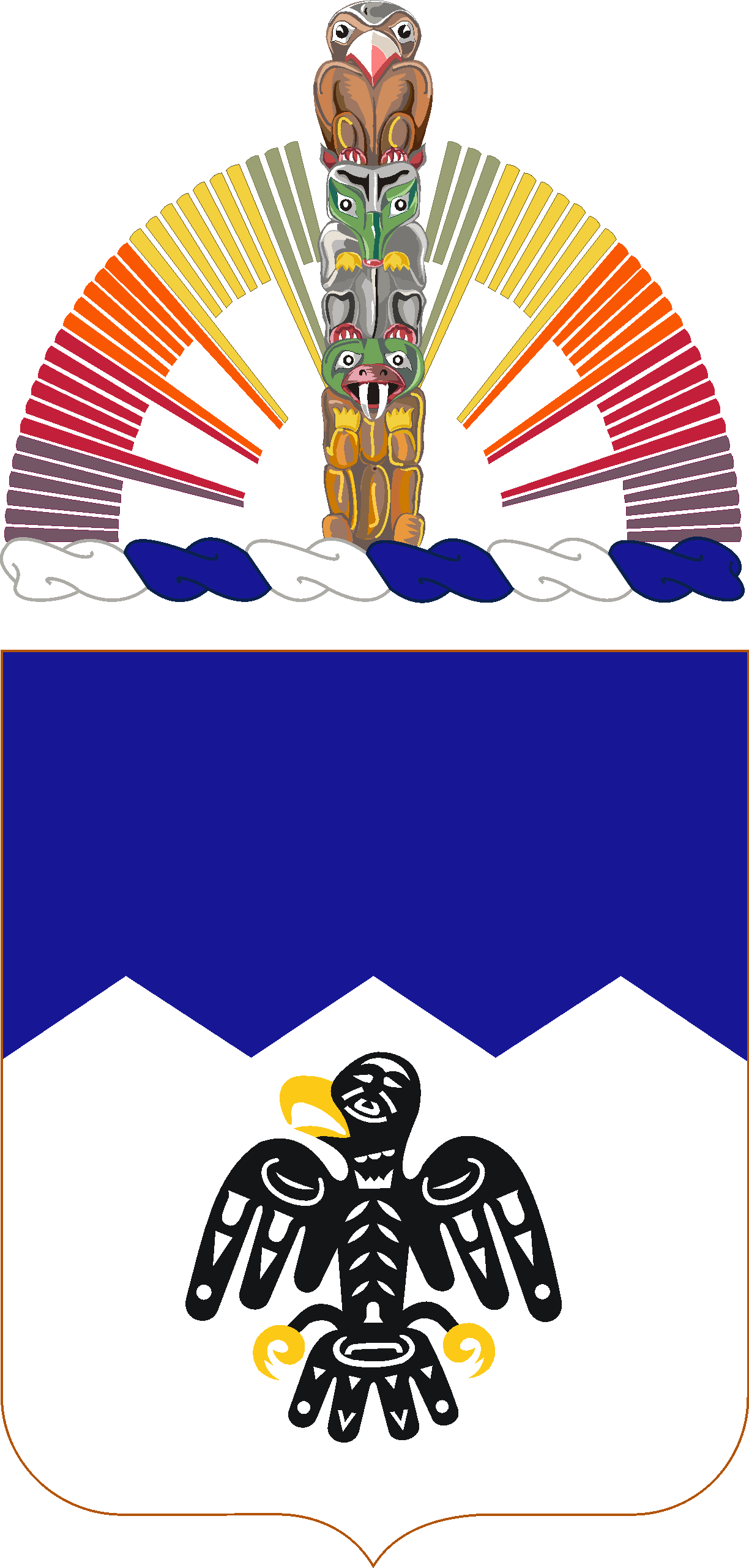
- Coat of Arms of the 297th Infantry
- Active: 1939–1944, 1959–present
- Country: United States
- Branch: United States Army
- Type: Infantry (Parent regiment under US Army Regimental System)
- Part of: 29th Infantry Brigade Combat Team (1st Battalion)
- Garrison/HQ: Joint Base Elmendorf–Richardson
- Nickname: Thunderwolves
- Mottos: "Yuh Yek" (Vigilance, Watchfulness)
- Engagements: Iraq War

Commanders
- Current commander: Lieutenant Colonel Luke S. Bushatz (1st Battalion)
- Command Sergeant Major: Command Sergeant Major Wilton Gleaton

Insignia
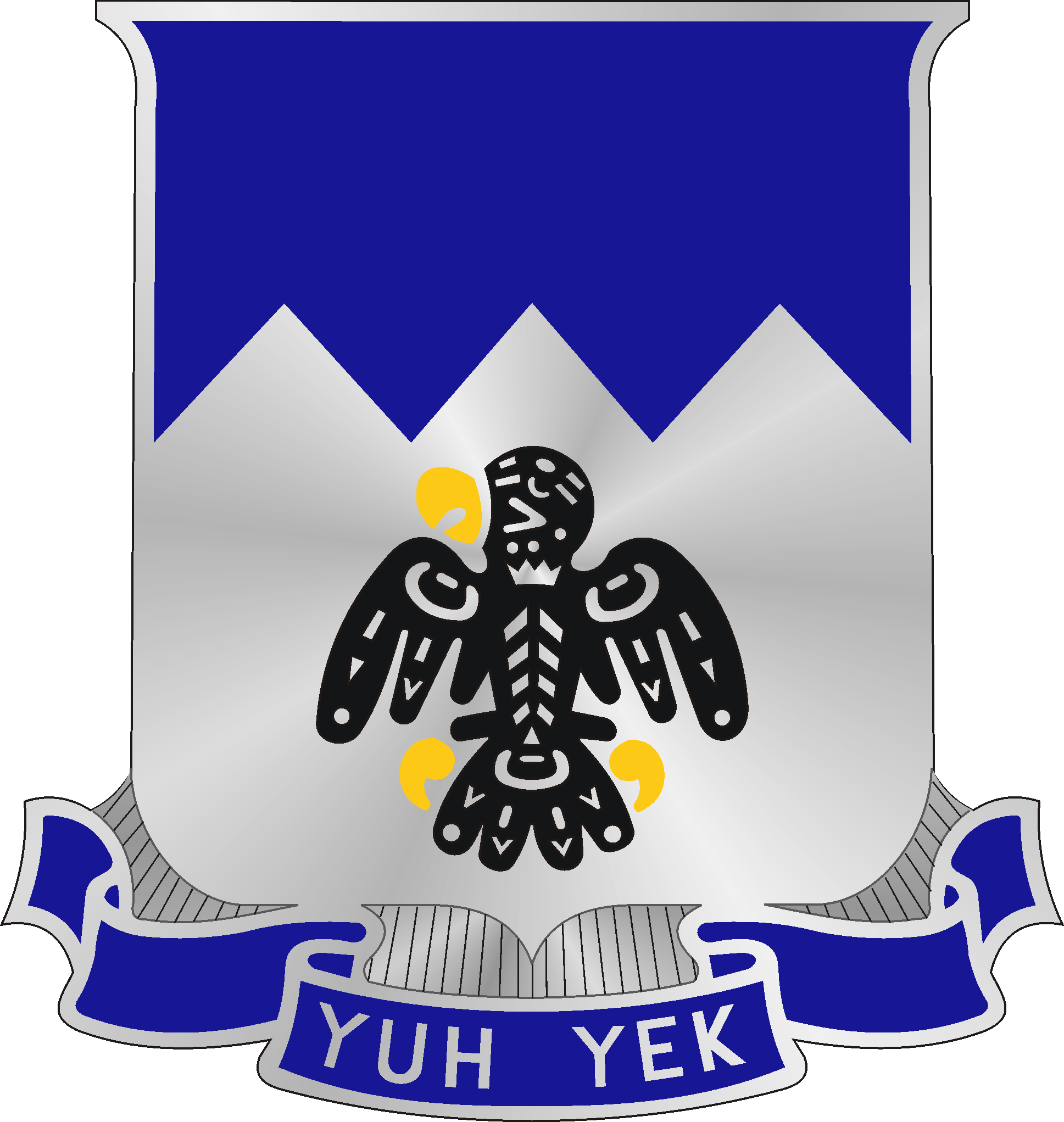
- 297th Infantry Distinctive Unit Insignia

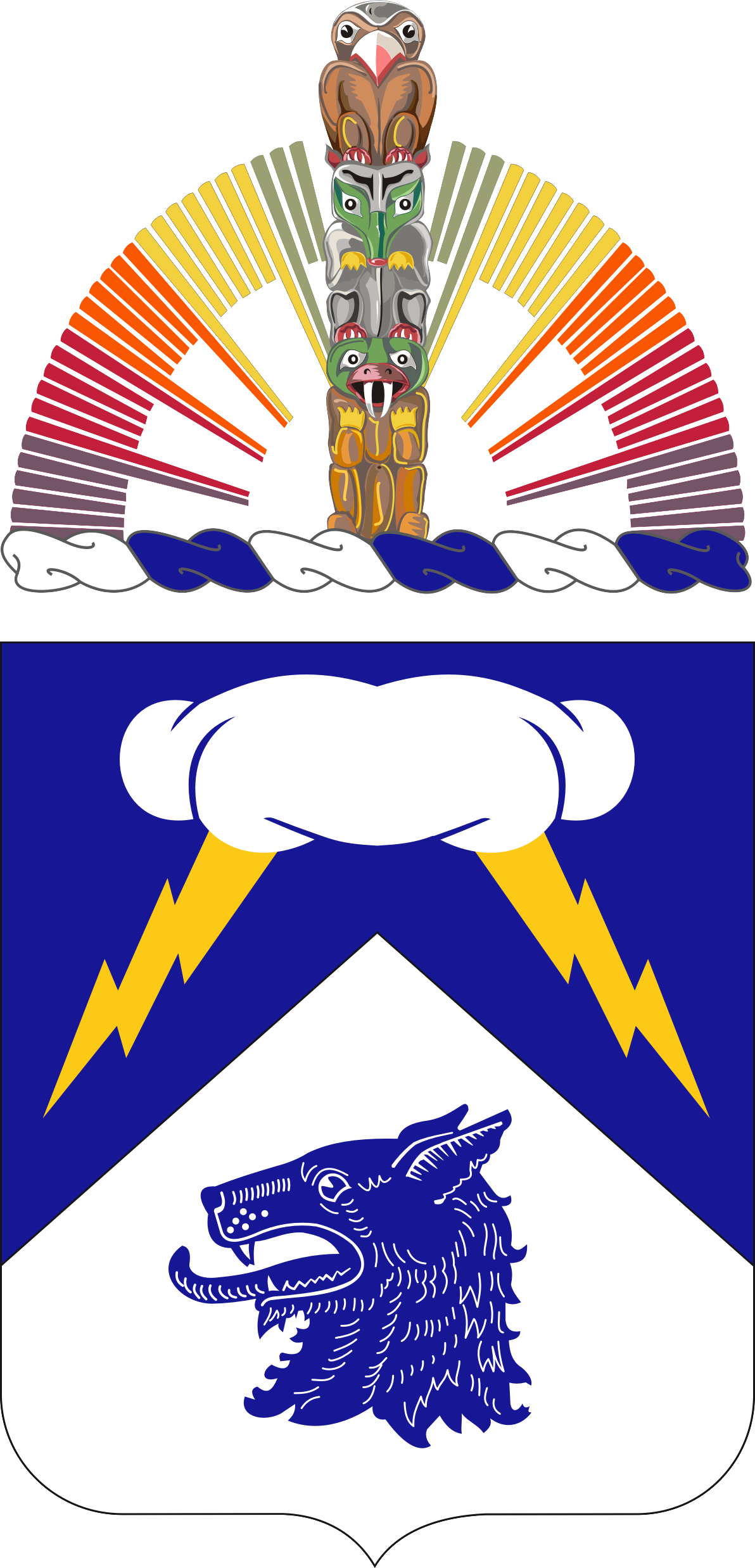
- 297th Cavalry Coat of Arms

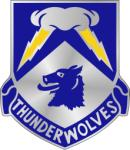
- 297th Cavalry Distinctive Unit Insignia

The 297th Infantry Regiment (Alaska Scouts) is a parent infantry regiment of the United States Army, represented in the Alaska Army National Guard by the 1st Battalion, tactically part of the 29th Infantry Brigade Combat Team.

Constituted in 1939 and organized in 1940 and 1941, the one-battalion regiment remained in Alaska during World War II, and became a separate infantry battalion in 1944. The 297th was reconstituted in 1959 with two battalions and a battle group, which later became a third battalion. In 1972, it was split into the 297th Infantry and the 297th Cavalry but both units merged as the 297th Infantry in 1976. The regiment's 3rd Battalion deployed to Iraq for Operation Iraqi Freedom between 2005 and 2006, and in 2009 it became the 297th Cavalry with 1st Squadron. In 2016, the 297th Cavalry became an infantry unit again.

== History ==
=== Formation and World War II ===
The 297th Infantry Regiment (Separate) was originally constituted as the first unit of the Alaska National Guard on 21 October 1939. The four companies were organized and Federally recognized during 1940: Company A on 21 September at Juneau, Company B on 17 September at Ketchikan, Company C on 10 October at Fairbanks and Company D on 4 October at Anchorage. The 1st Battalion, including a headquarters and the four previously formed companies, was organized and Federally recognized on 11 January 1941 with headquarters at Juneau. It was commanded by Major Charles G. Burdick from 11 January to 27 June. On 15 September, the 1st Battalion was inducted into Federal service and moved to Fort Richardson for duty, where it arrived around 30 September. Meanwhile, A and B Companies were transferred to Chilkoot Barracks near Haines. The battalion was assigned to the Alaska Defense Command. On 26 January 1944, it was redesignated as the 208th Infantry Battalion (Separate). On 24 February 1945, the battalion arrived in the contiguous United States at the Seattle Port of Embarkation. On 14 April it was assigned to the Replacement and School Command. The 208th was inactivated at Camp Shelby, Mississippi, on 16 May 1945.

=== Postwar ===
On 15 March 1949, the 207th Infantry Battalion, Separate, was constituted and allotted to the Alaska National Guard. It was organized and Federally recognized on 25 January 1950 with headquarters, headquarters and service company at Anchorage. On 12 July, the 208th Infantry Battalion, Separate, was reactivated, covering southeastern Alaska with headquarters at Juneau. On 1 October 1953, the 208th dropped the "Separate" designation. On 1 February 1959, the 207th and 208th were consolidated with the 1st and 2nd Scout Battalions to form the 297th Infantry, a Combat Arms Regimental System (CARS) parent regiment. The 207th became the 3rd Battle Group of the 297th Infantry, which also included the 1st and 2nd Scout Battalions. The 3rd Battle Group was redesignated as the regiment's 3rd Battalion on 20 January 1964.

On 1 May 1972, the 3rd Battalion was converted and redesignated as the 297th Cavalry, a CARS parent regiment that included the 5th Squadron. The squadron's elements were redesignated from 3rd Battalion units: Headquarters and Headquarters Troop was redesignated from the 3rd Battalion's Headquarters and Headquarters Company, Troop A from Company A at Ketchikan, Detachment 1 of Troop A from Detachment 1 of Company A at Sitka, Detachment 2 of Troop A from Detachment 2 of Company A at Kodiak, Troop B from Company B at Anchorage, Detachment 1 of Troop B from Detachment 1 of Company B at Kenai and Soldotna, Detachment 2 of Troop B from Detachment 2 of Company B at Seward, and Company C from the 216th Transportation Company at Fairbanks. The 297th Infantry remained active with the 1st and 2nd Scout Battalions.

On 1 October 1976, the 297th Cavalry was broken up and converted into 5th Battalion, 297th Infantry. Troop A became Company C, Troop B became Company A, Detachment 2 of Troop B was consolidated with Detachment 1 of the same troop to become Detachment 1 of Company A, and Troop C became Company B. The reunited 297th Infantry also included the 1st, 2nd, and 3rd Battalions. A 4th Battalion was activated on 1 November 1978. In 1988 the 1st Battalion was at Nome, the 2nd Battalion at Bethel, the 3rd Battalion at Kotzebue, the 4th Battalion at Juneau, and the 5th Battalion at Anchorage. On 1 May 1989, the 297th was withdrawn from CARS and reorganized under the United States Army Regimental System (USARS). It was reorganized to add the 6th Battalion (Light) at Juneau on 1 September of that year, which was assigned on the same date to the Fort Richardson-based 1st Brigade, 6th Infantry Division (Light) as a roundout unit. The 6th Battalion was formed from the existing 4th Battalion units, and a new 4th Battalion organized in western Alaska. The 4th Battalion was inactivated on 30 September 1992, and 3rd and 5th Battalions followed on 1 September 1994. A year later, the 6th Battalion was redesignated as the 3rd Battalion.

=== 21st century ===
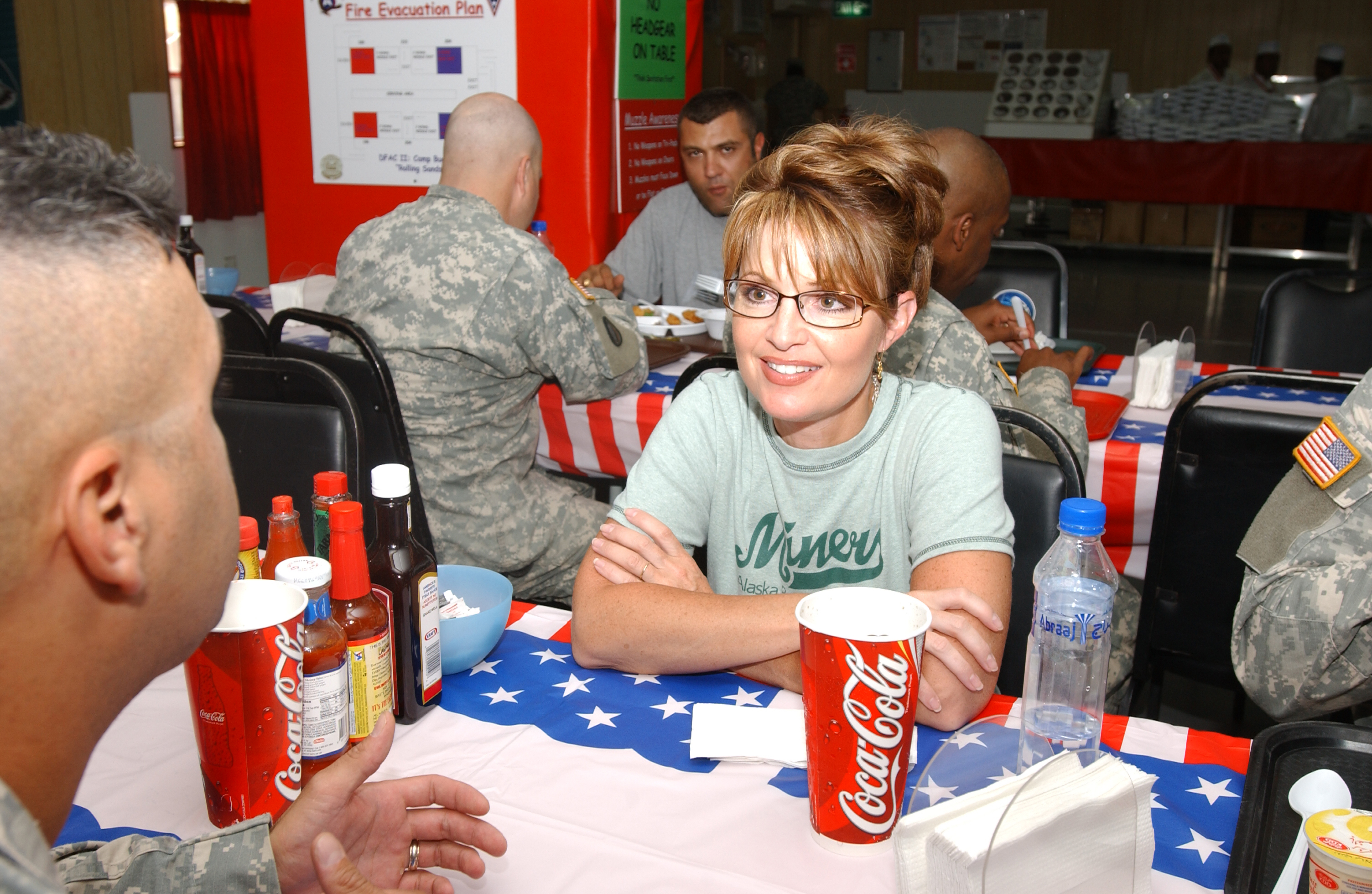
Palin visiting soldiers of the 3rd Battalion at Camp Buehring, July 2007

The unit was redesignated the 297th Infantry Regiment on 1 October 2005. On 6 July 2006, the 297th's 3rd Battalion was ordered into active Federal service at home stations. During predeployment training at Camp Shelby, two soldiers of the battalion were killed (SFC George W. Dauma and SSG William F. Brown) and two other soldiers were seriously wounded in a 20 July accident on U.S. Route 98. In the largest Alaska National Guard deployment since World War II, the unit provided security in Kuwait and Iraq in support of Third Army, and did not suffer casualties during its deployment. It was stationed at Camp Buehring, Camp Virginia, and Camp Navistar. In July 2007, Alaska Governor Sarah Palin visited the unit in Kuwait. The 3rd Battalion returned to Camp Shelby in October, and was released from active Federal service 1 January 2008, reverting to state control. On 1 September 2009, the regiment was converted into the 297th Cavalry Regiment, consisting of the 1st Squadron, headquartered at Fairbanks. On 16 October 2016, the 1st Squadron, 297th Cavalry became the 1st Battalion, 297th Infantry at Joint Base Elmendorf–Richardson. The new unit was commanded by Lieutenant Colonel Jeffrey Roberts. It included a headquarters company, three rifle companies (A, B, and D), and a forward support company. C Company was assigned to the Wyoming Army National Guard. Since the conversion to infantry, the battalion has been tactically part of the 29th Infantry Brigade Combat Team, and administratively part of the 38th Troop Command.
