= Naval militias in the United States =

United States military reserve organization

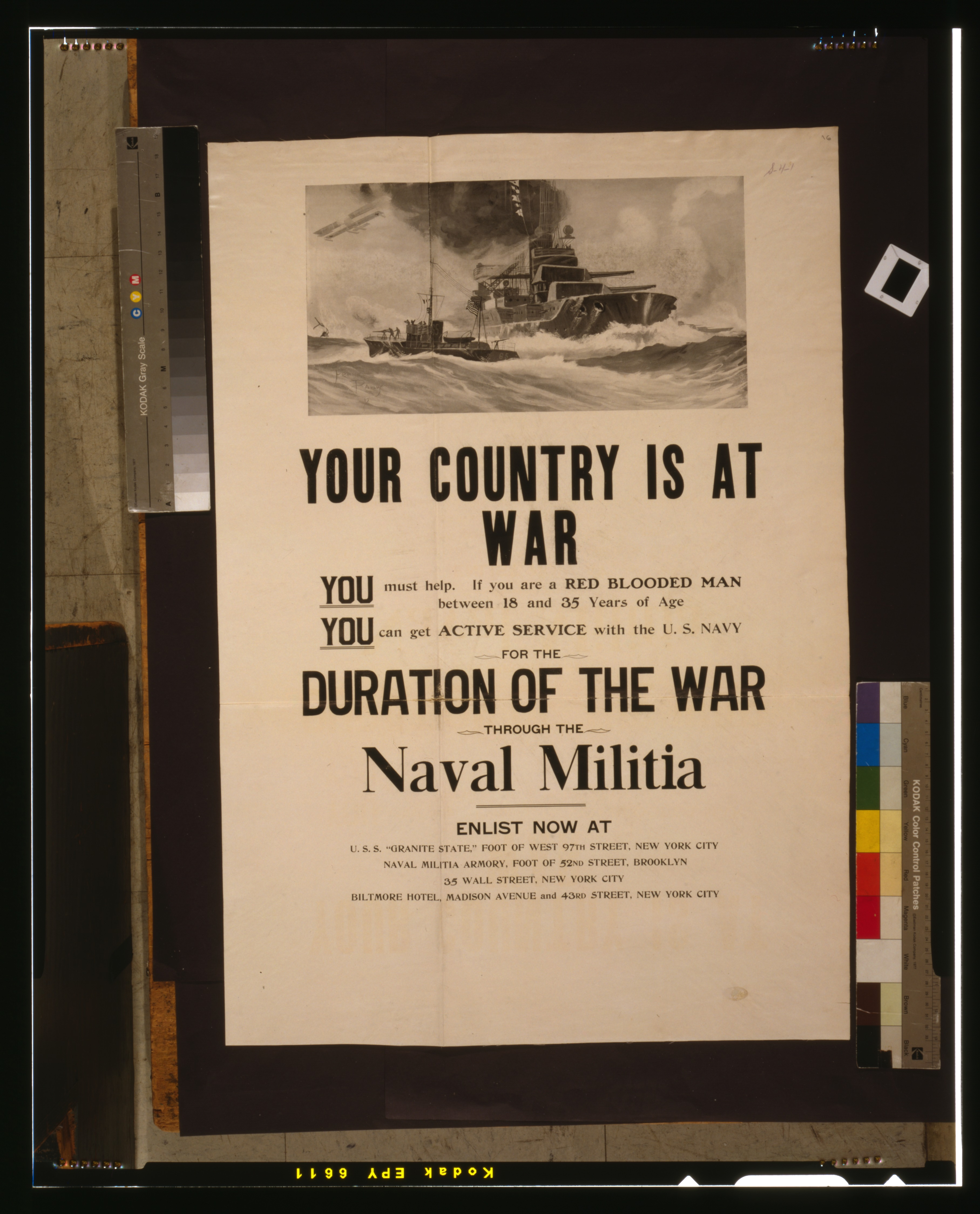
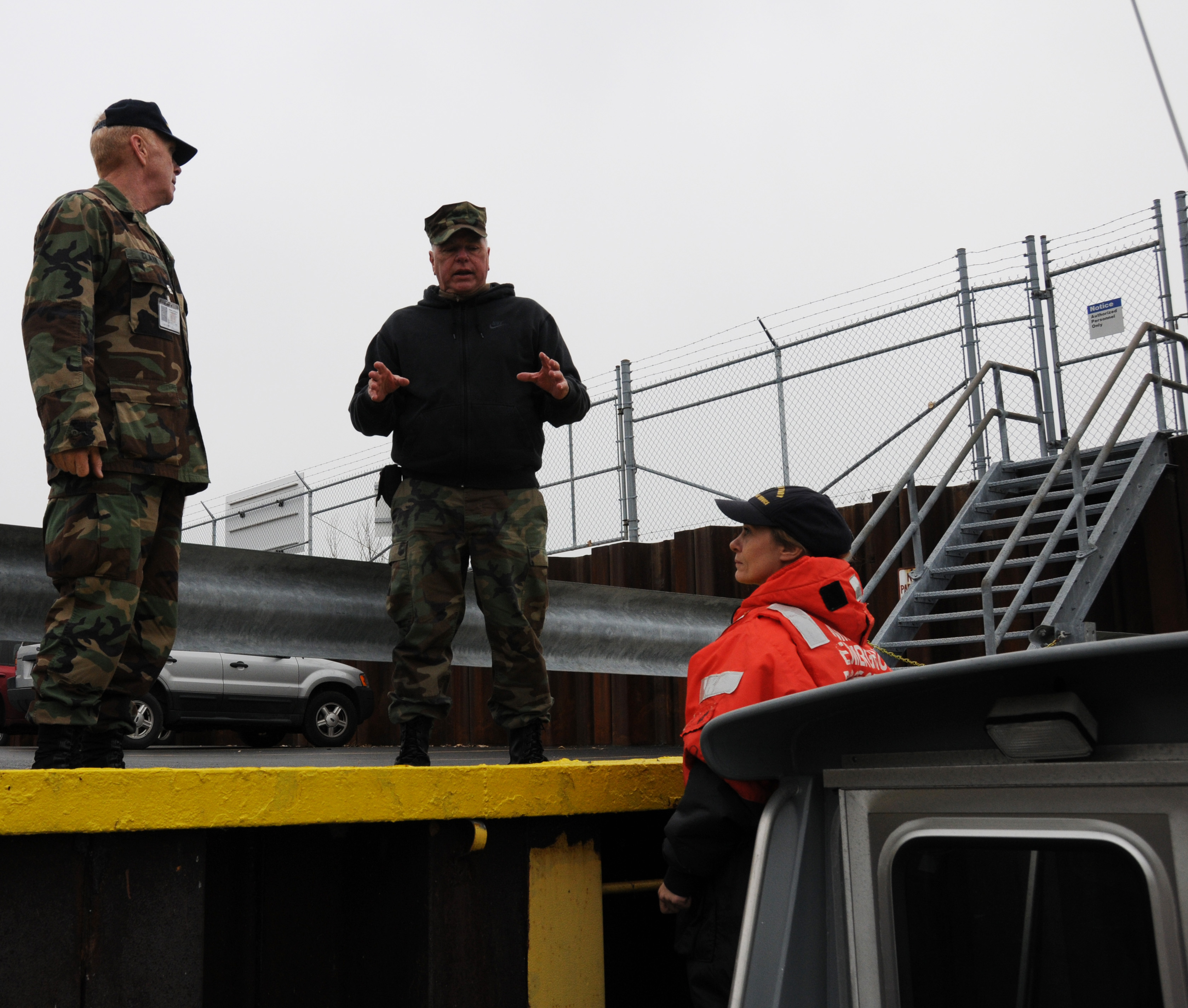
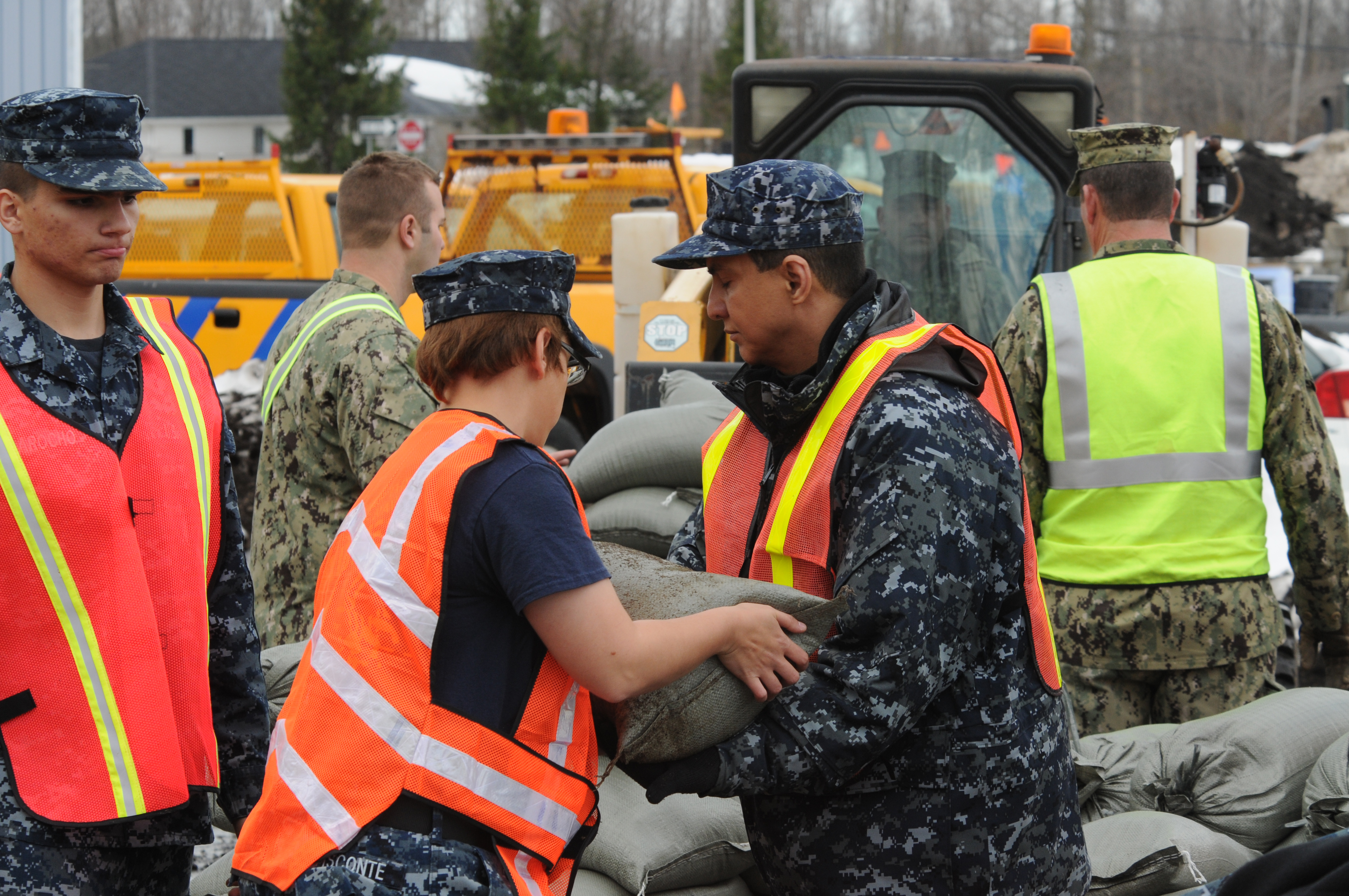
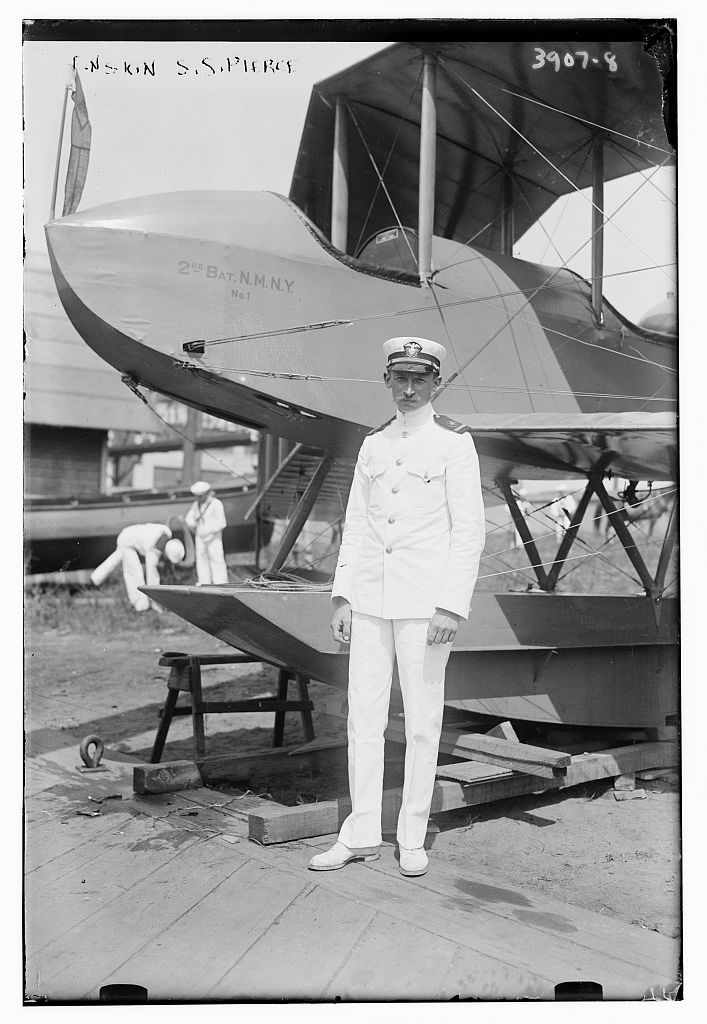
Top left: A recruiting poster for the Naval Militia in 1917. Top right: Commander David Tucker, NYNM, instructing subordinates. Bottom left: Members of the New York Naval Militia fill sandbags to aid in the preparations for possible flooding. Bottom right: Ensign S.S. Pierce of the New York Naval Militia stands next to an airplane in the early 20th century.

A naval militia is a reserve military organization administered under the authority of a state government in the United States. It is often composed of federal reservists who are also members of the Navy Reserve, Marine Corps Reserve, or the Coast Guard Reserve, in addition to retirees and civilian volunteers. Naval militias are differentiated from the Coast Guard Auxiliary, which is a federally-chartered civilian component of the U.S. Coast Guard that falls under the command of the commandant of the Coast Guard through the Chief Director of the Auxiliary, and the United States Maritime Service and United States Merchant Marine, both of which are federal maritime services.

Under Title 10 of the United States Code, naval militias are also treated differently from maritime state defense forces that are composed mainly of civilian volunteers. Naval militias are considered part of the organized militia, unlike state defense forces which are part of the unorganized militia.

Naval militiamen are allowed to be simultaneous members of one of the federal reserve forces such as the Navy, Marine Corps, or Coast Guard Reserve. Additionally, naval militia members who do not hold a federal status may be enlisted or commissioned into the federal sea services at the rank they are qualified for, at the discretion of the secretary of the Navy. This differs from state defense forces, whose members are prohibited from simultaneous membership in a federal reserve component.

Naval militias may receive federal supplies and use Navy or Marine Corps facilities also available to Navy Reserve or Marine Corps Reserve units, subject to certain restrictions.

Like members of the National Guard, the Navy and Marine Reservists who constitute most of the membership in naval militias serve in a dual federal and state capacity. They are part of their state's military forces and are subject to call by the governor of their respective states during emergencies. However, unlike civilian members of state defense forces, reserve sailors and marines serving in naval militias are liable to be federalized like National Guard personnel, coming under the command of the president in emergencies.

== History ==
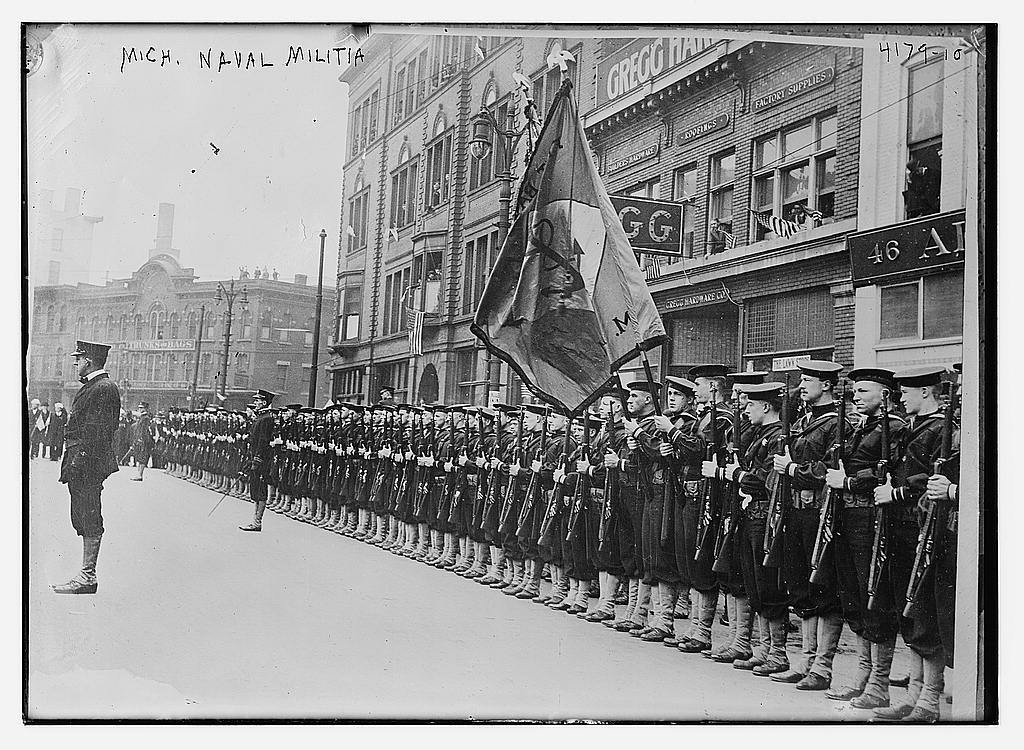
The Michigan Naval Militia standing at attention (at present arms).

In the 1880s, a United States Navy proposal to organize a national Naval Reserve Force was submitted to the United States Congress, but the proposal was defeated. However, the movement to create a naval reserve force became popular at the state and local level. Following the passage of enabling legislation in several states, several of these states began establishing naval reserve forces. The first naval militia which was first organized and drilling was the Massachusetts Battalion, which first met on 28 February 1890. The New York Naval Militia was organized as a Provisional Naval Battalion in 1889, and formally became the second state naval militia when it was officially mustered into state service as the First Battalion, Naval Reserve Artillery, on 23 June 1891. Over the next few years, several other states, mainly in the eastern United States and in the Great Lakes region, created their own naval militias.

The United States Navy began loaning older veteran ships from the American Civil War, such as USS Minnesota and USS Wabash, to state naval militias for use as armories and headquarters. On 2 March 1891, the United States Congress passed an appropriations bill which gave the secretary of the Navy $25,000 per year to spend on the state naval militias; this money was divided among the states based on the strength levels of the naval militias.

The naval militias were called into service during the Spanish–American War. Since no law existed to call them into federal service as a unit, governors were asked to release volunteers from their state service, and these naval militiamen were inducted into the Navy for the duration of their service during the war. New York Naval Militiamen manned two auxiliary cruisers that fought in the Battle of Santiago de Cuba, and conducted patrols of New York Harbor. Members of the North Carolina Naval Militia crewed USS Nantucket and guarded the city of Port Royal, South Carolina. South Carolina Naval Militia sailors also assisted in the defense of Port Royal, and served aboard multiple ships, including USS Celtic, USS Chickasaw, USS Cheyenne, and USS Waban. Members of the Connecticut Naval Militia served aboard USS Minnesota. Sailors from both the Rhode Island Naval Militia and the Florida Naval Militia were also assimilated into the ranks of the Navy.

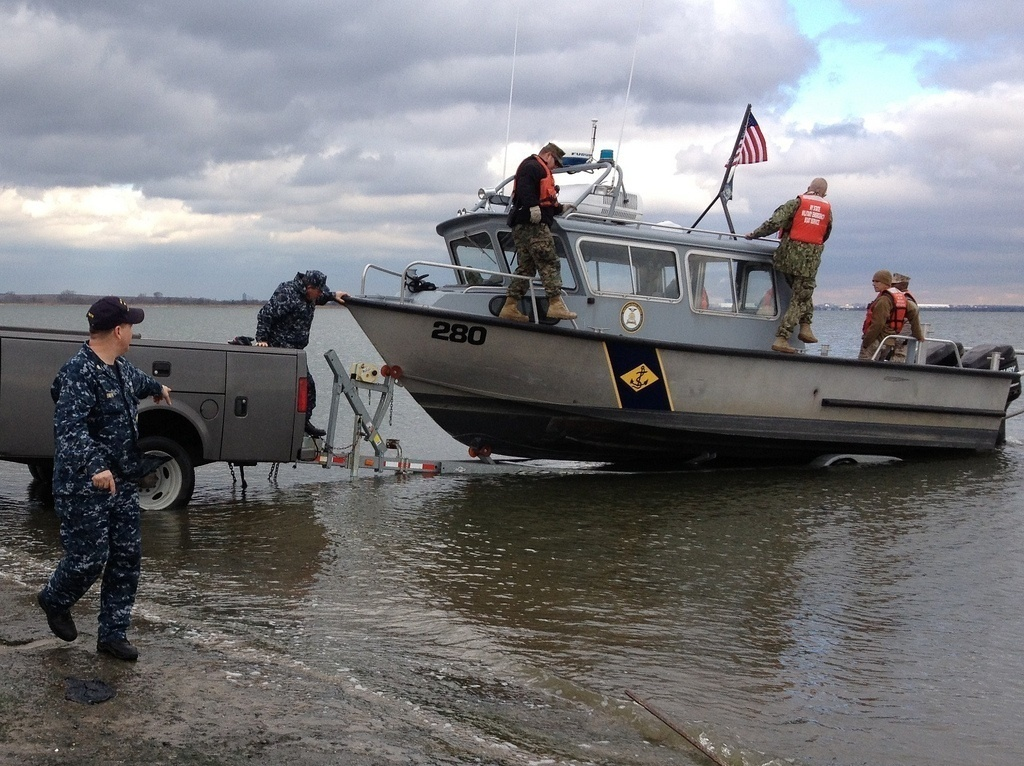
New York Naval Militia members respond to Hurricane Sandy.

Naval militias within the United States reached their peak at the eve of World War I, when they existed across 26 states and territories. In 1914, Congress passed a bill recognizing the naval militia as a reserve component of the United States Armed Forces and reorganized them into the National Naval Volunteers. During World War I, naval militiamen were drafted into federal service. Many naval reservists, including a significant number of sailors from the Michigan Naval Militia, served in Naval Railway Battery crews on the Western Front.

The primary federal responsibility of naval militiamen was cemented by the Naval Reserve Act of 1938, which abolished the act of 1925. It mandated that at least 95 percent of the members of naval militia units also had to be members of the organized (drilling) portion of the United States Naval Reserve for the unit to have access to available "vessels, material, armament, equipment, and other facilities" of the active Navy. In 1940 and 1941, the naval militias were once again federalized as part of the broader mobilization of the Navy, Marine Corps, and Coast Guard Reserves immediately prior to World War II. Following the war, many states either did not rebuild their naval militias, or deactivated them in the years that followed. By the mid-1960s, at the height of the Cold War, only the New York Naval Militia was still active.

However, several naval militias were activated or reactivated in the late 20th century and early 21st century. In 1977, the Ohio Naval Militia was reactivated. In 1984, the Alaska Naval Militia was activated. From 1999 to 2002, the New Jersey Naval Militia was reactivated after 36 years of existing only on paper. In 2003, the South Carolina General Assembly reactivated the South Carolina Naval Militia. The New York Naval Militia is the only naval militia which has been continuously active since its creation, thereby making it the oldest naval militia.

Naval militias have been deployed multiple times in recent years to assist in national security or disaster recovery operations. In 1989, the Alaska Naval Militia was deployed to assist in recovery operations after the Exxon Valdez oil spill. On September 11, 2001, the New Jersey Naval Militia and New York Naval Militia were deployed in the immediate aftermath of the September 11 attacks to aid in emergency response efforts. The New York Naval Militia provided assistance after Hurricane Irene and Tropical Storm Lee in 2011; after Hurricane Sandy in 2012; and during the Buffalo lake effect snowstorm in 2014. In March 2020, the Alaska Naval Militia and the New York Naval Militia were activated to assist their respective states' efforts in combating the COVID-19 pandemic.

The Center for Naval Analysis concluded in a 2007 paper that "Naval militias were undergoing something of a revival after years of neglect."

== States with naval militias ==
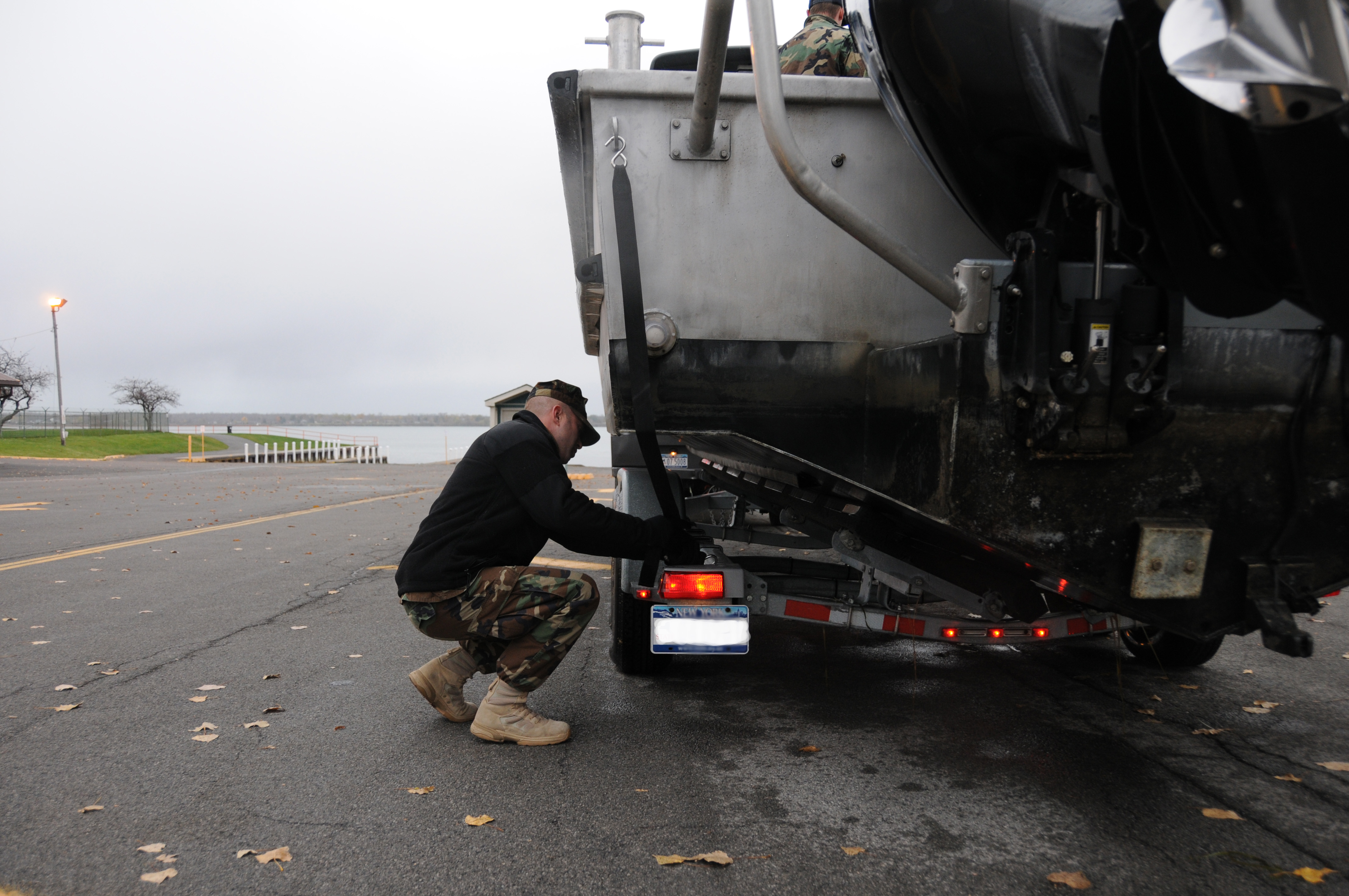
An officer with the New York Naval Militia prepares his vessel for transport.

=== Active ===
- Alaska Naval Militia
- California State Guard Maritime Component
- New York Naval Militia
- Ohio Naval Militia
- South Carolina Naval Militia

=== Authorized by statute but inactive ===
- Alabama
- Connecticut Naval Militia
- District of Columbia Naval militia remains an authorized force by Federal statute, but has been inactive for several decades with no current membership.
- Florida Naval Militia
- Georgia Naval Militia

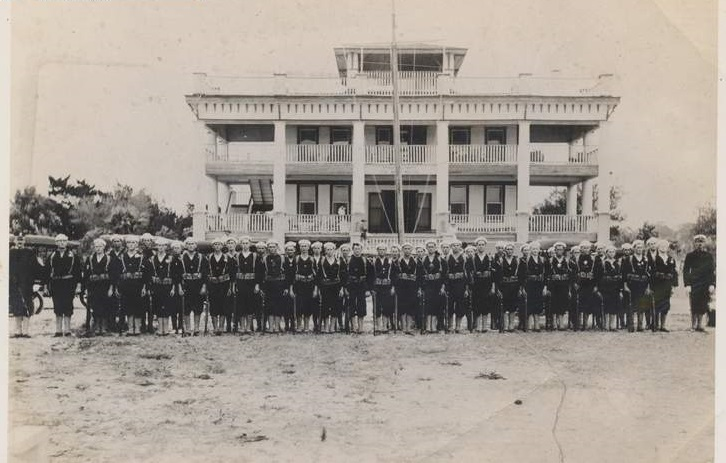
Florida Naval Militia sailors from Sarasota, Florida pose for a photo.

- Hawaii Naval Militia
- Illinois Naval Militia
- Indiana Naval Militia
- Louisiana Naval Militia
- Maine
- Maryland Naval Militia
  - Maryland Public Safety Statute, Title 13 does not currently authorize the creation of a Naval Militia, (2015)
- Massachusetts Naval Militia
- Michigan Naval Militia
- Minnesota Naval Militia
- Missouri Naval Militia
- New Hampshire
- New Jersey Naval Militia
- North Carolina Naval Militia
- Oregon Naval Militia
- Pennsylvania Naval Militia
- Rhode Island Naval Militia
- Tennessee
- Washington Naval Militia
- Wisconsin Naval Militia

== Gallery ==
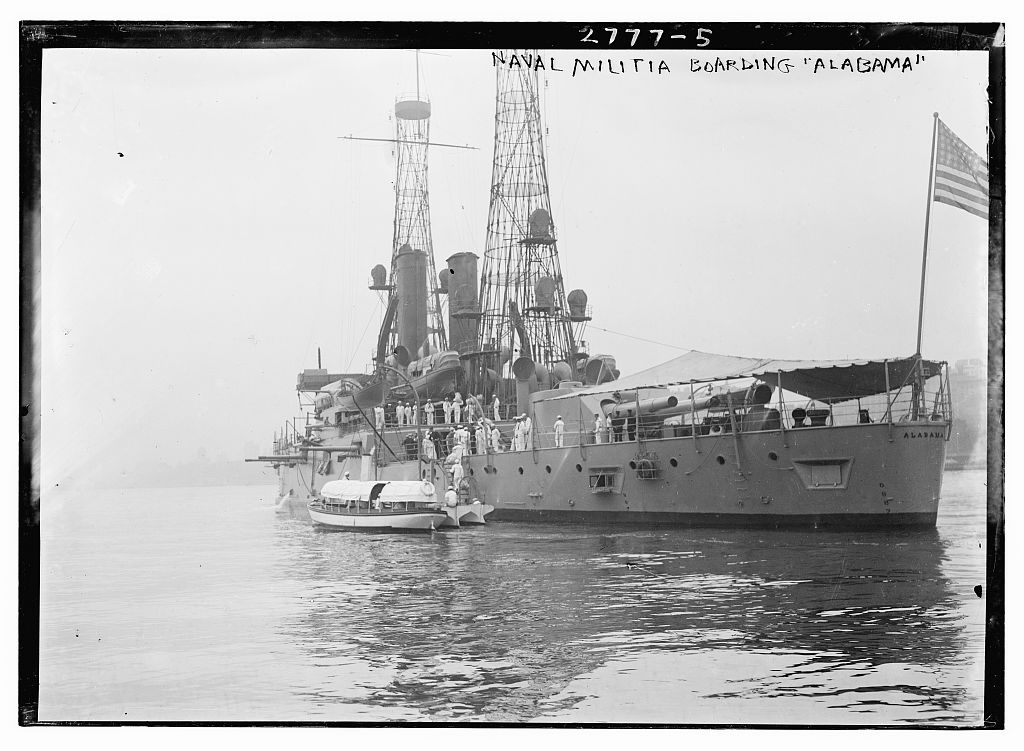
Naval militiamen boarding USS Alabama circa 1910.

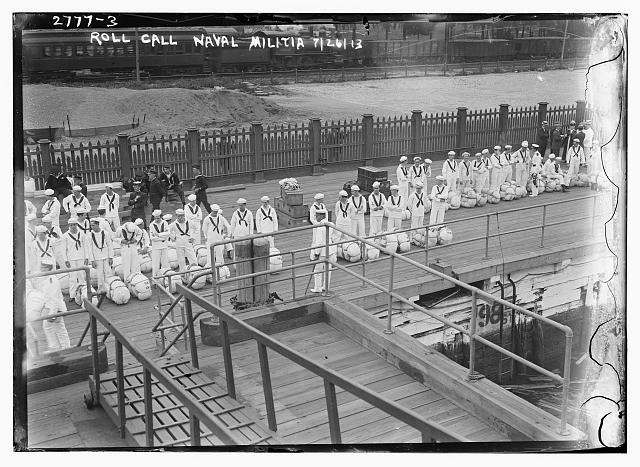
Members of the naval militia respond to a roll-call in 1913.

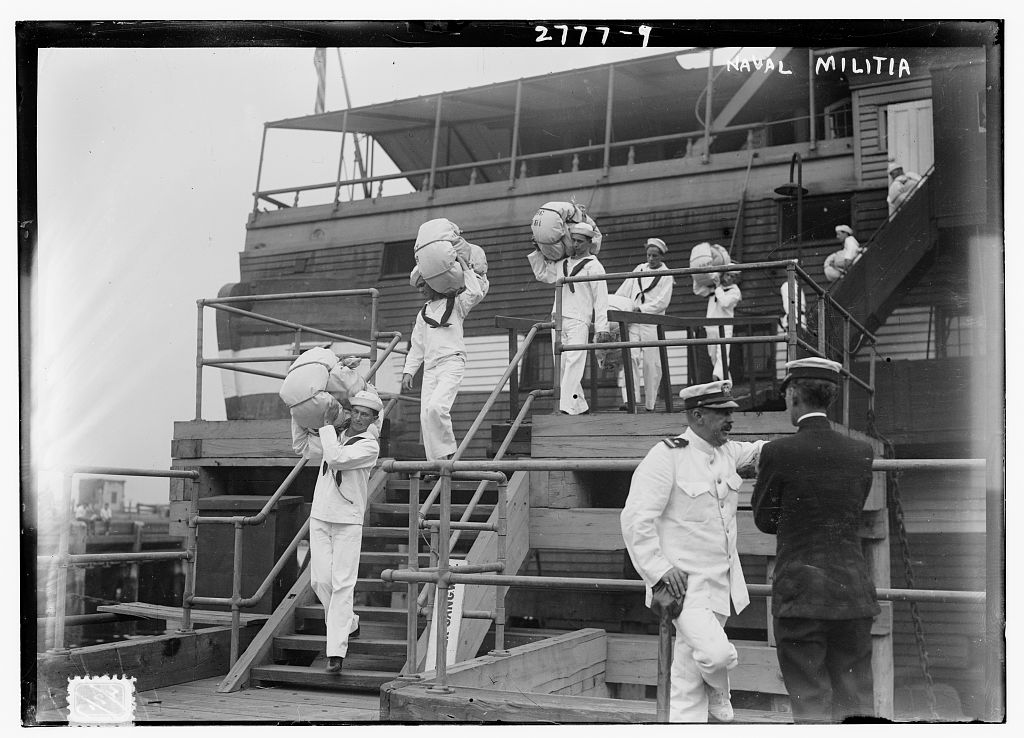
Naval militiamen in the early twentieth century.

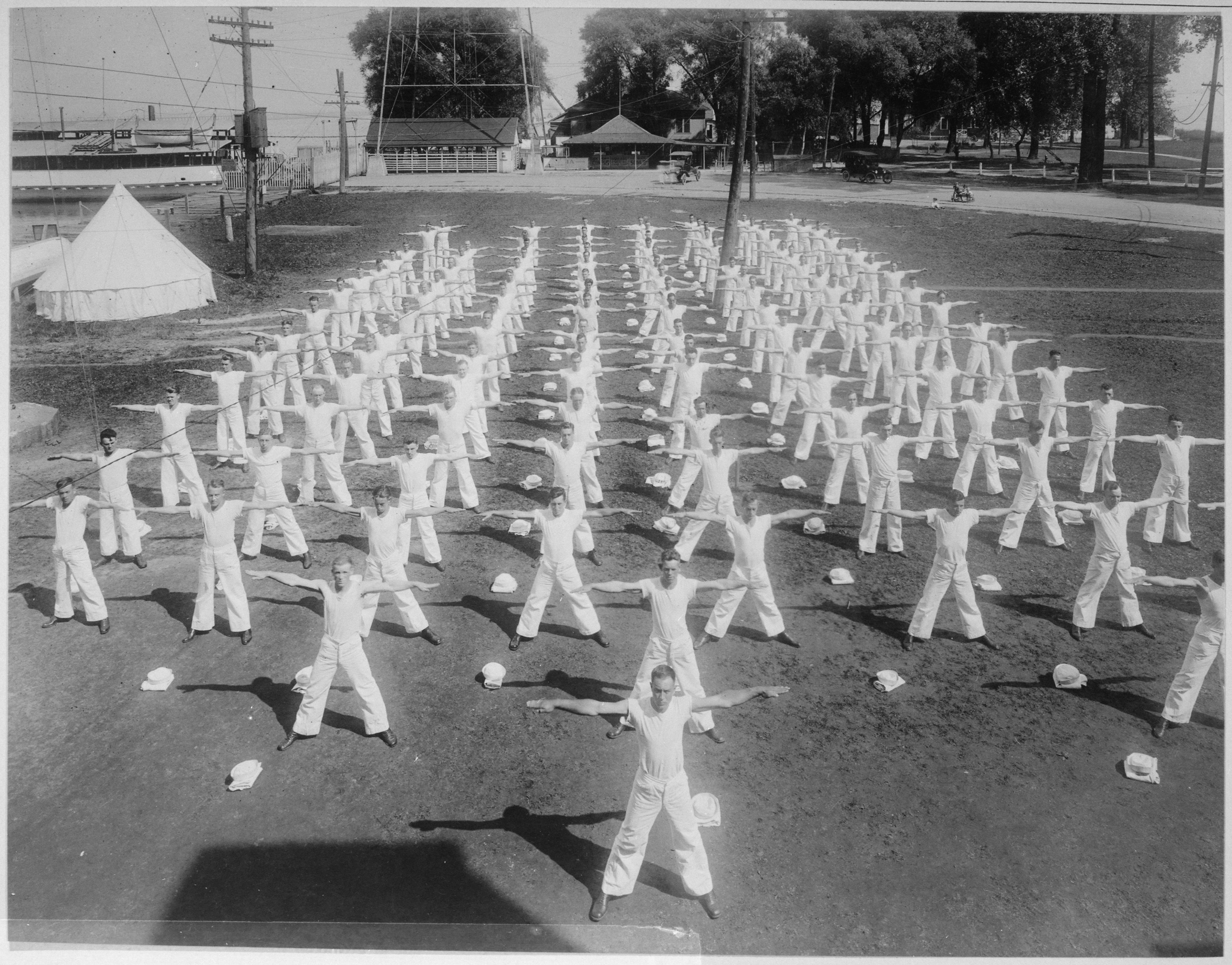
Exercises at a Naval Militia Camp in Somersville, New York.

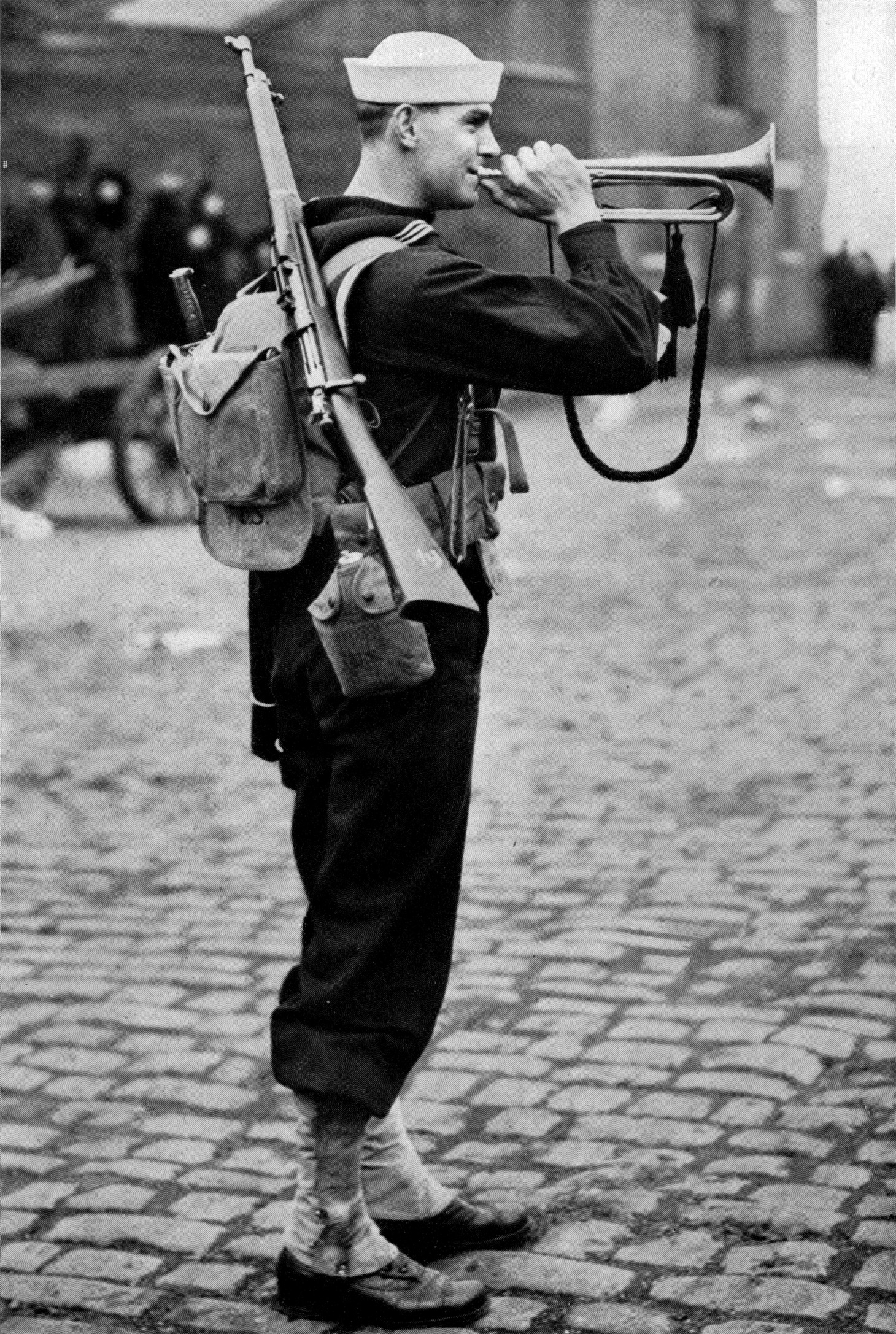
A naval militia bugler in 1917, deploying during World War I.

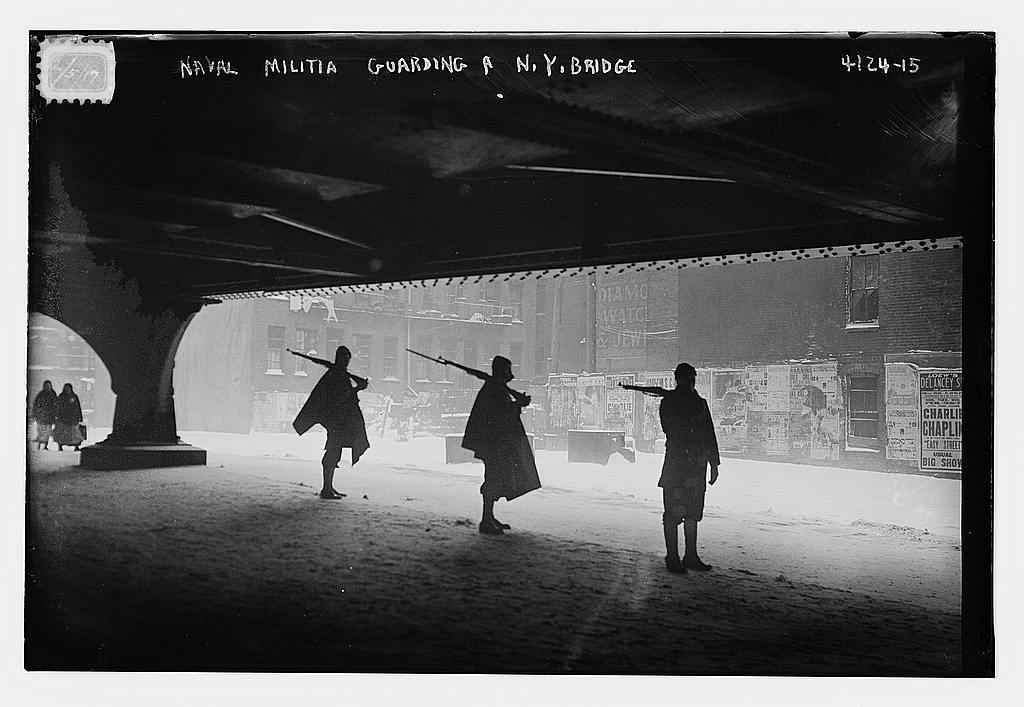
Naval Militia guarding a bridge during World War I.

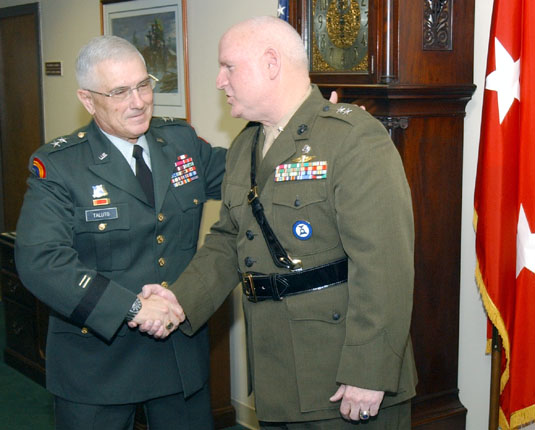
New York Naval Militia Major General Robert Wolf (right), is congratulated by Major General Joseph Taluto (left).

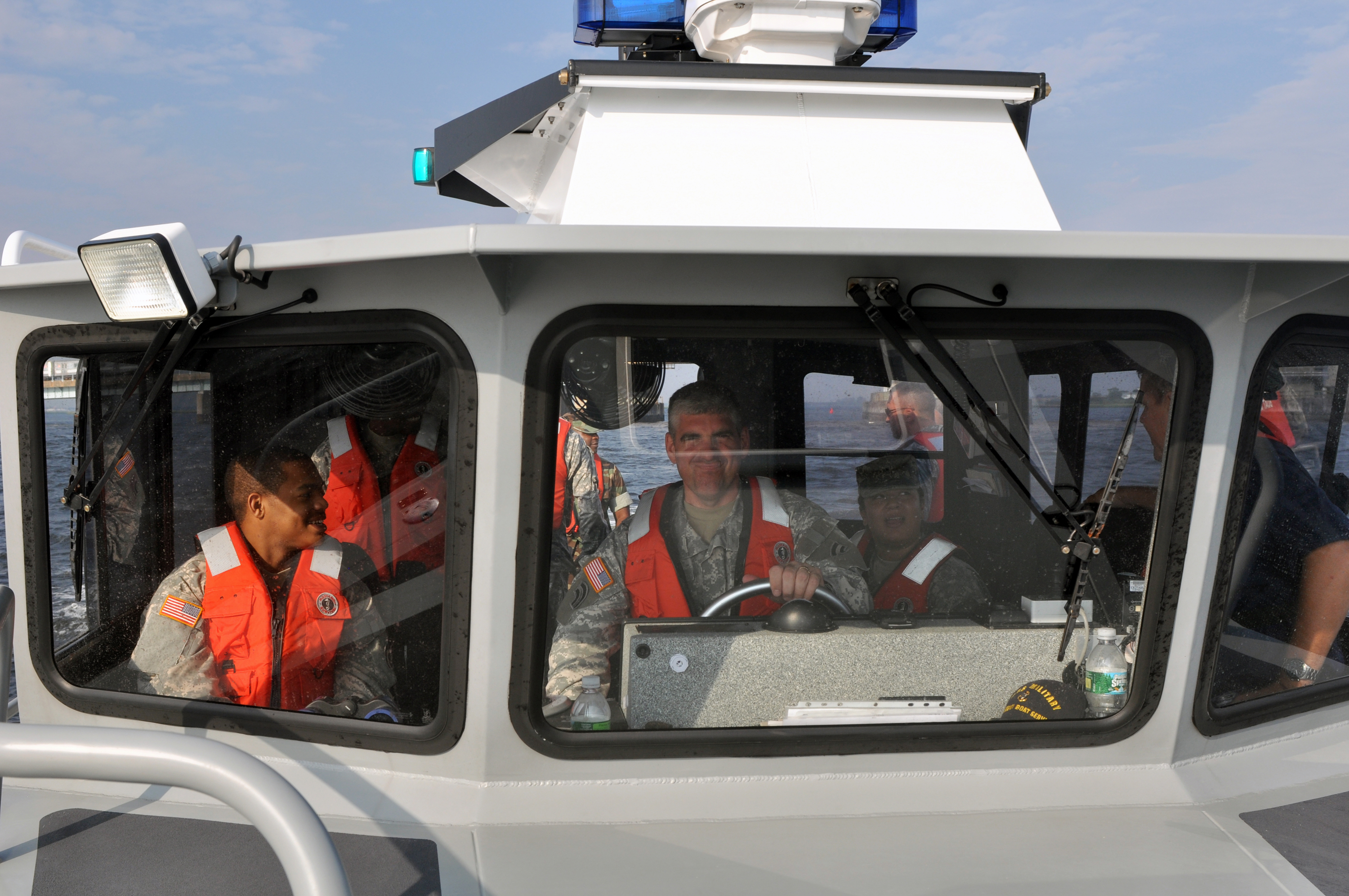
Members of the New York National Guard take the helm of a New York State Naval Militia patrol boat.

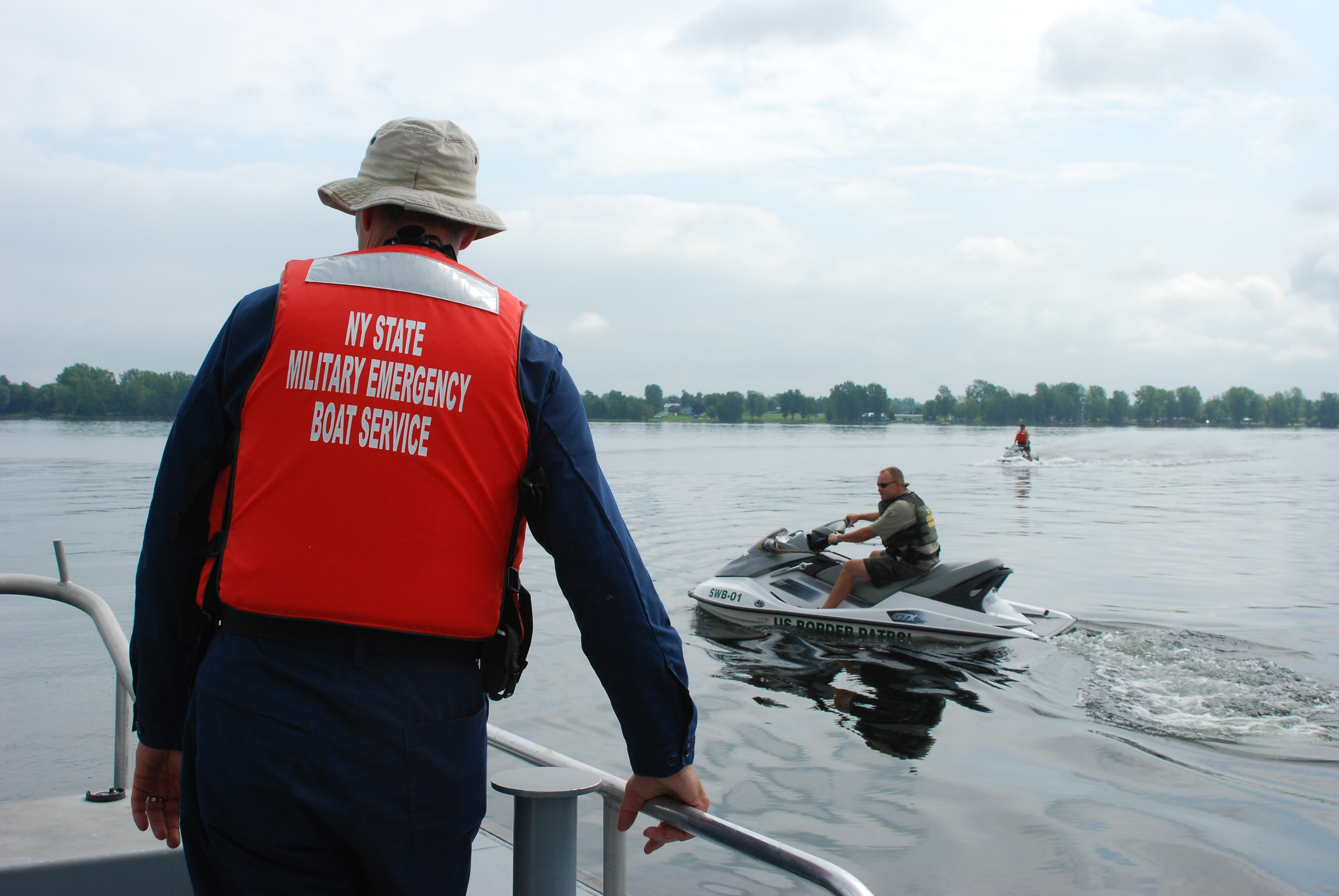
A New York Naval Militia officer works alongside a United States Border Patrol agent.

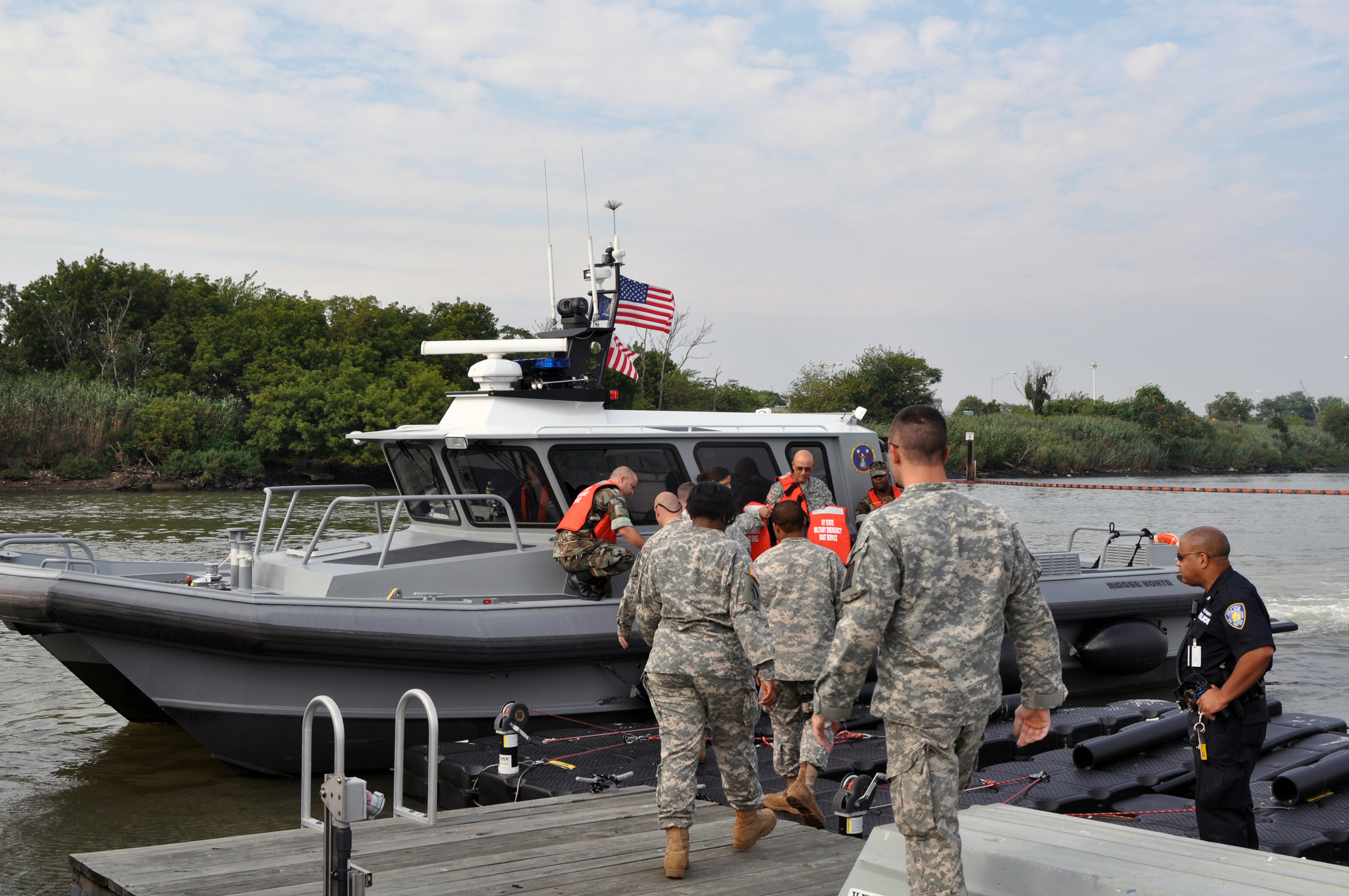
Members of the New York National Guard join members of the New York State Naval Militia, the Port Authority Police Department and the Coast Guard Reserve.

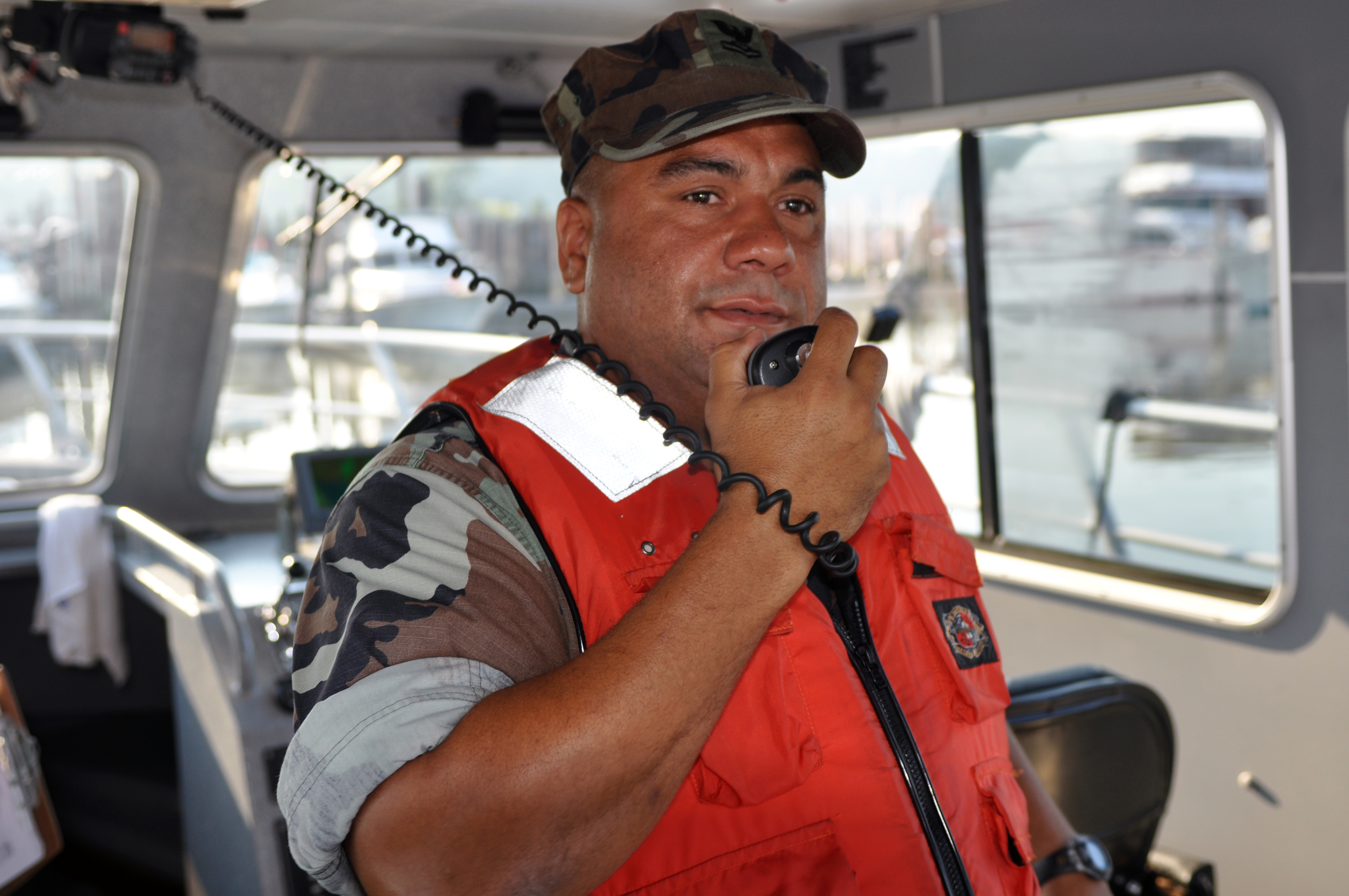
Boatswain Mate 2 Robert Quinones of the New York State Naval Militia prepares for a joint random anti-terrorism measures program patrol.

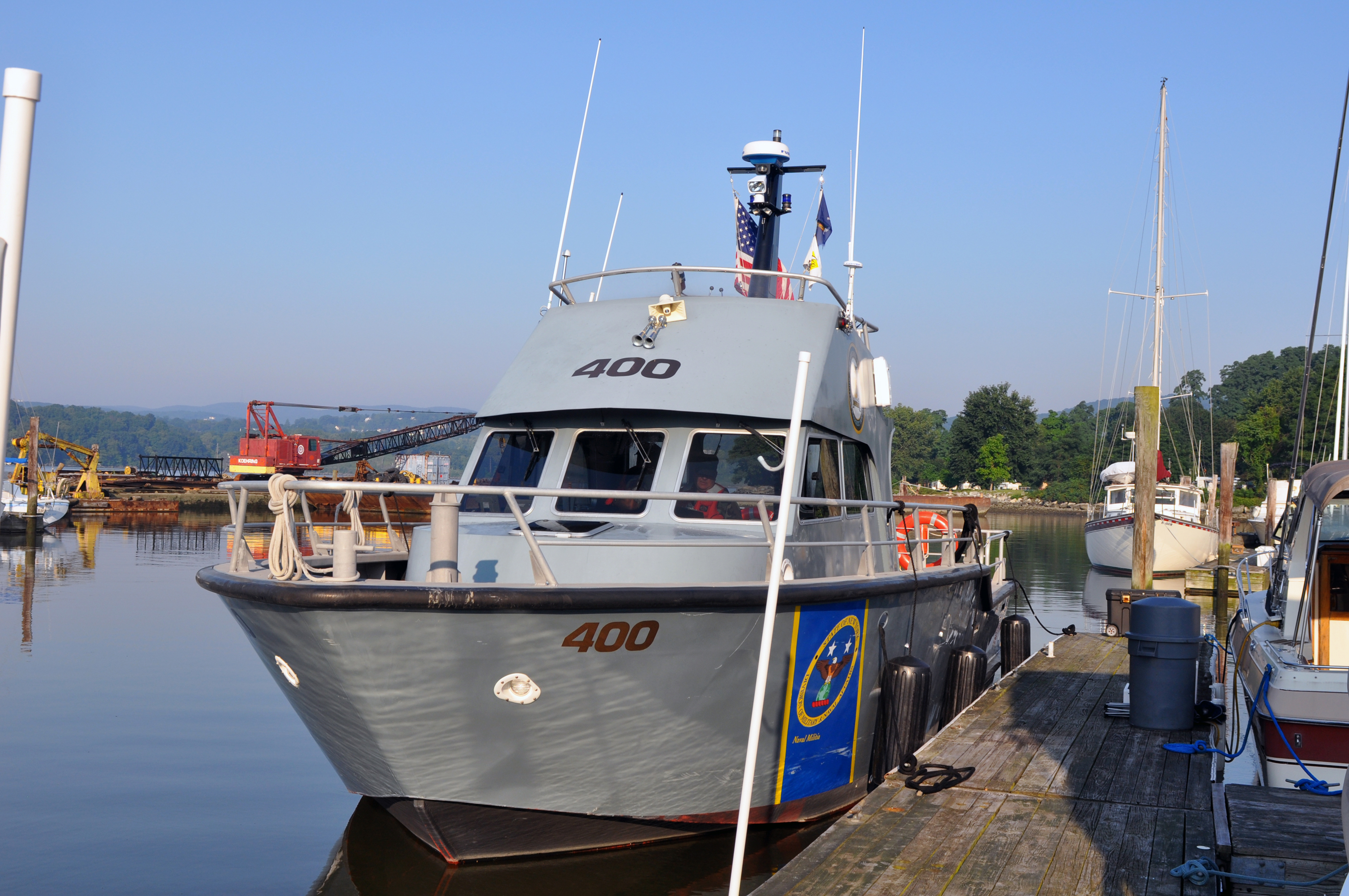
The New York State Naval Militia's Patrol Boat 400 is docked on the Hudson River prior to a random anti-terrorism measures program patrol.

== See also ==
- Naval militia – overseas counterparts
- United States Coast Guard Auxiliary
- Civil Air Patrol
- State Defense Forces
- United States Naval Sea Cadet Corps
- United States Power Squadrons
