= South Carolina Naval Militia =

- South Carolina Naval Militia insignia
- Founded: 2003
- Country: United States
- Allegiance: South Carolina
- Type: Naval militia
- Role: Military reserve force
- Part of: South Carolina Law Enforcement Division

Commanders
- Governor: Governor Henry McMaster

The South Carolina Naval Militia (SCNM) is the naval militia of the state of South Carolina. The SCNM is a naval unit organized at state level and primarily composed of Navy and Marine Corps reservists who serve simultaneously as federal and state level reservists. The SCNM can be deployed by the Governor of South Carolina to assist in emergency response or in homeland security operations.

== History ==
South Carolina navy ensign

Prior to the creation of the federal military reserves, the United States maintained a small professional military which was augmented by state militias in times of war. The South Carolina Naval Militia saw service in the Spanish–American War when SCNM sailors manned artillery batteries in Port Royal and served aboard multiple ships, including USS Celtic, USS Chickasaw, USS Cheyenne and USS Waban. With the creation of the United States Naval Reserve, the United States Navy was reorganized to draw reserves from a federal reserve force rather than state militias, leading to many states disbanding their naval militias.

Prior to the reestablishment of the SCNM, the United States Coast Guard commander in Charleston, South Carolina maintained a unit of volunteers organized as a para-naval militia called the Volunteer Port Security Force, which consisted of 40-50 nonmilitary boats and their owners who agreed to report suspicious behavior to the Coast Guard.

In 2003, the South Carolina General Assembly passed the South Carolina Maritime Security Act which officially reestablished the South Carolina Naval Militia and requires the Maritime Security Commission, a committee created by the act, to actively maintain and facilitate the activities of the naval militia in order to further homeland security operations.

== Legal status ==
Naval militias of individual U.S. states are recognized by the federal government of the United States under 10 U.S. Code §246. The South Carolina Maritime Security Act reestablished the South Carolina Naval Militia as a component of the South Carolina Law Enforcement Division effective 21 July 2003.

== Membership ==
As a federally recognized naval militia, the SCNM must set membership requirements according to federal standards in order to be granted access to federal equipment. Under 10 U.S. Code § 8904, in order to be eligible to use vessels, material, armament, equipment, and other facilities available to the United States Navy Reserve and the United States Marine Corps Reserve, at least 95% of members of the naval militia must also be members of the United States Navy Reserve or the United States Marine Corps Reserve.

South Carolina law also commissions a Merchant Marine division within the SCNM composed of Coast Guard-licensed or certificated merchant mariners who maintain active membership in the Volunteer Port Security Force as well as other licensed merchant mariners.

== See also ==
- Civil Air Patrol
- South Carolina National Guard
- South Carolina State Guard
- State defense force
- United States Coast Guard Auxiliary
