= Indiana Militia =

Indiana Militia may refer to:

- Indiana National Guard, which is Indiana's organized-militia component of the US Army National Guard and Air National Guard
- Indiana Guard Reserve, which is the official organized militia of the State of Indiana, also known as the State Defense Force
- Indiana Naval Militia, which is Indiana's currently inactive naval militia
- Indiana Legion, a historic militia operating during the mid and late 19th century
- Indiana Rangers, an organized militia operating during the early 19th century

== See also ==
- Militia (United States), organized and unorganized
