= COVID-19 pandemic in Alaska =

Ongoing COVID-19 viral pandemic in Alaska, United States

- Disease: COVID-19
- Pathogen: SARS-CoV-2
- Location: Alaska, U.S.
- Index case: Anchorage
- Arrival date: March 7, 2020
- Confirmed cases: 290,515
- Hospitalized cases: 80 (Current)
- Ventilator cases: 40 (current)
- Recovered: 3,042
- Deaths: 1,270

Government website
- coronavirus.alaska.gov (archived)

The COVID-19 pandemic was confirmed to have reached the U.S. state of Alaska on March 12, 2020.

On March 11, Governor Mike Dunleavy's office declared a state of emergency to ensure all entities have the necessary response resources. The next day, the first case, a foreign national in Anchorage, was announced to the public.

As of July 2022, 71.9% of the state has received at least one vaccine dose and 52.7% has received a booster shot.

== Impact ==
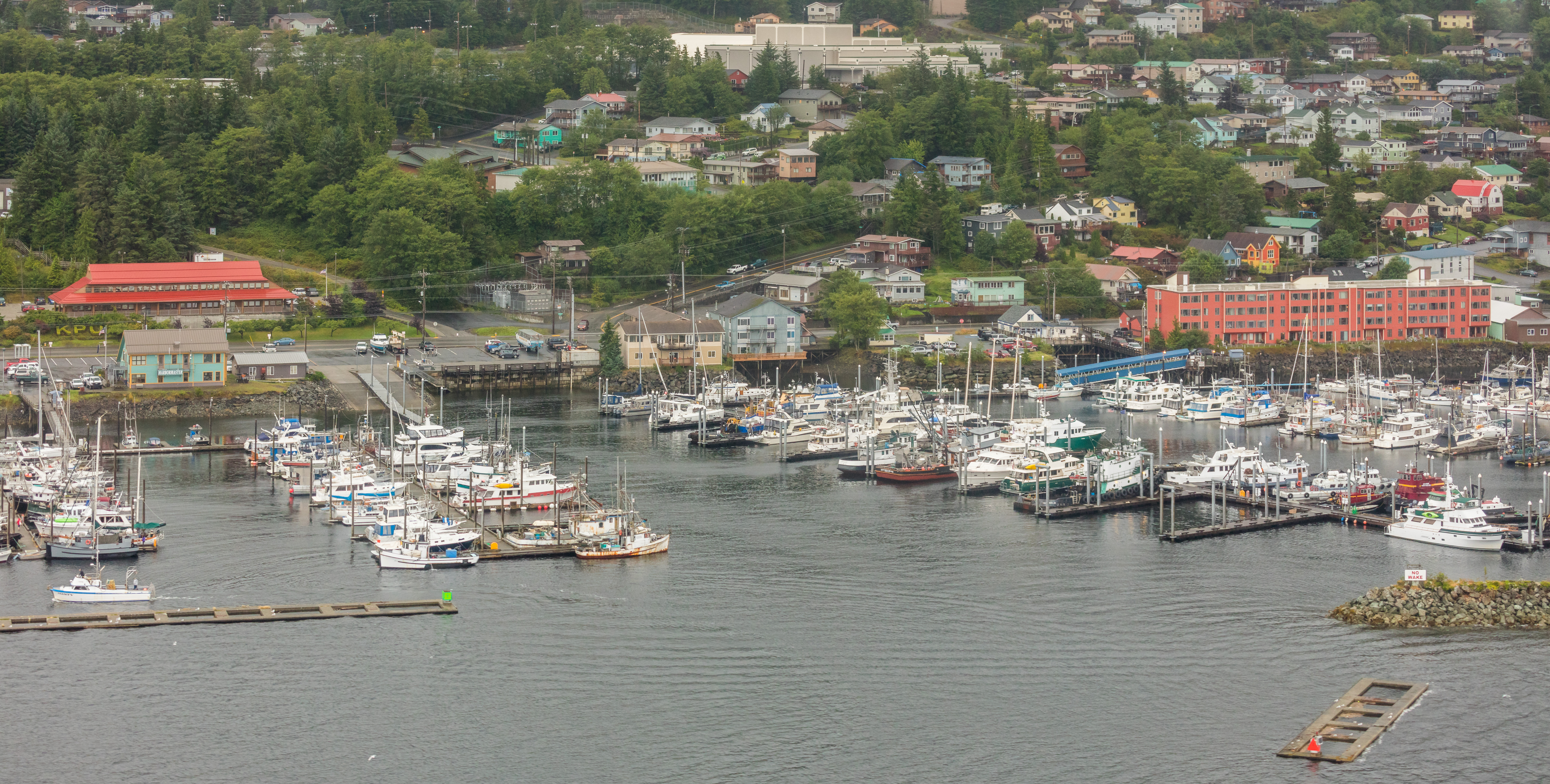
Ketchikan, one of the places affected by COVID-19 during the 2020 outbreak in Alaska

On March 21, 2020, Ketchikan, a small, coastal town of approximately 8,000 residents located in Southeast Alaska was determined to have a cluster of six COVID-19 cases. The town sheltered in place for the following 14 days. On March 24, 2020, three more cases of COVID-19 were found in Ketchikan, bringing the total there to nine. The next day, the total cases there reached 11. On April 1, 2020, the number of positive cases of COVID-19 in Ketchikan rose to 14.

== Measures ==
In early March, Governor Mike Dunleavy activated the State Emergency Operations Center under Alaska's Department of Military and Veterans Affairs. Joint Task Force-Alaska was stood up to provide a coordinated effort for the Alaska Army and Air National Guard, the Alaska State Defense Force, and the Alaska Naval Militia to support the state.

On March 13, Governor Dunleavy ordered public schools to close from March 16 to 30, which was later extended to May 1. School districts were advised to find ways to use remote learning, but there was concern about the impact on the youngest students, special ed students, and small and remote areas where online learning is more difficult.

On March 17, Governor Dunleavy announced the creation of the Alaska Economic Stabilization Team (AEST).

Effective March 18, restaurants were restricted to take-out and delivery, and entertainment venues such as movie theaters and gyms were closed.

Then Mayor of Anchorage Ethan Berkowitz issued an "emergency hunker down order" effective March 22. Some businesses were closed in Fairbanks North Star Borough and Ketchikan Gateway Borough. Some villages restricted air travel. Mike Dunleavy ordered everyone arriving in Alaska to self-quarantine for 14 days upon arrival, effective March 25, with limited exceptions.

On May 19, Governor Dunleavy announced the lifting of all state mandates for businesses and public gatherings, keeping only a mandatory (but unenforced) quarantine period for persons coming from out of state.

In June 2020, Dunleavy announced a new extension of the two week quarantine measure that would require travelers visiting the state to present a negative test of the virus if they are not willing to self-quarantine for two weeks.

As part of the United States' vaccination campaign, Dunleavy announced in April 2021 that the state would offer free vaccinations to tourists at major Alaskan airports starting June 1.

== Remote communities ==
By March 22, some remote villages were attempting to isolate themselves.

In the event of a COVID-19 case being identified in a remote community, the state plan is to transport the patient to a hub city for treatment rather than dispatching medical workers to the remote area.

== See also ==
- Timeline of the COVID-19 pandemic in the United States
- COVID-19 pandemic in the United States – for impact on the country
- COVID-19 pandemic – for impact on other countries
