= Indiana Guard =

Indiana Guard may refer to:

- Indiana National Guard, which is Indiana's organized-militia component of the US Army National Guard and Air National Guard
- Indiana Guard Reserve, which is the official organized militia of the state of Indiana, also known as the State Defense Force

== See also ==
- Militia (United States), organized and unorganized
