= Elfrida (disambiguation) =

Elfrida is a feminine given name - see Elfriede. Elfrida may also refer to:

- Elfrida, Arizona, an unincorporated community in the United States
- 618 Elfriede, an asteroid
- SS Elfrida, a Norwegian cargo ship in service from 1947 to 1959
- USS Elfrida (SP-988), a United States Navy patrol vessel in commission in 1898, from 1899 to 1908, and from 1909 to 1918
- Elfrida, a 1752 tragedy by William Mason
- Elfrida, a 1985 opera by Hungarian composer Erzsébet Szőnyi (1924–2019)
