= USS Elfrida =

Patrol vessel of the United States Navy

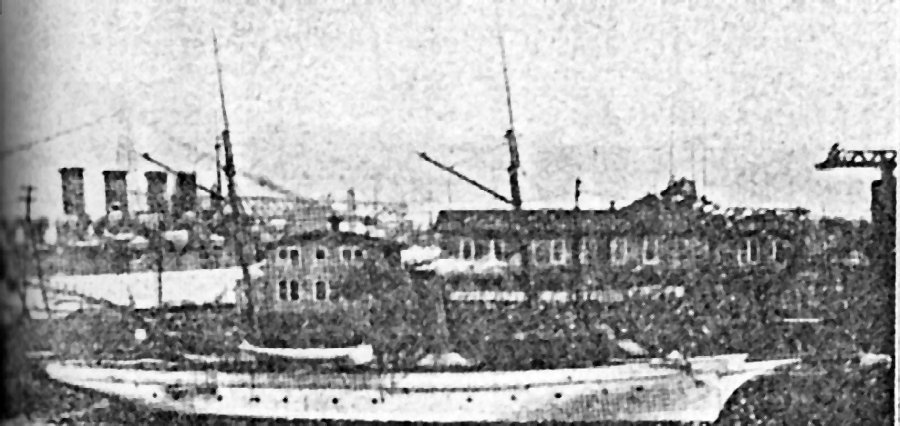
- USS Elfrida in a photograph from the 1914 edition of Jane's Fighting Ships

History

United States
- Name: USS Elfrida
- Namesake: Previous name retained
- Builder: Harlan and Hollingsworth, Wilmington, Delaware
- Completed: 1889
- Acquired: 15 June 1898
- Commissioned: 30 June 1898
- Decommissioned: 14 September 1898
- Recommissioned: 29 April 1899
- Decommissioned: 27 June 1908
- Recommissioned: 20 August 1909
- Decommissioned: 31 March 1918
- Reclassified: Section patrol boat (SP-988) in 1917
- Fate: Sold 11 May 1918
- Notes: Operated as private yacht Elfrida 1889–1898

General characteristics
- Type: Patrol vessel
- Displacement: 164 tons
- Length: 101 ft 6 in (30.94 m)
- Beam: 18 ft (5.5 m)
- Draft: 7 ft 9 in (2.36 m)
- Propulsion: Sails plus engine
- Sail plan: Schooner-rigged
- Speed: 10 knots
- Armament: 1 × 3-pounder rapid-firing gun; 2 × 1-pounder rapid-firing guns

USS Elfrida, later USS Elfrida (SP-988), was a United States Navy patrol vessel in commission from 1898 to 1918. She served in the Spanish–American War and World War I.

== Construction, acquisition, and commissioning ==
Elfrida was built as a steel schooner of the same name in 1889 by Harlan and Hollingsworth at Wilmington, Delaware, for use as a private yacht. The U.S. Navy purchased her on 15 June 1898 for use as a patrol yacht in the Spanish–American War. After fitting out at the New York Navy Yard in Brooklyn, New York, she was commissioned on 30 June 1898 as USS Elfrida.

== United States Navy service ==
Based in New York City, Elfrida patrolled along the Connecticut coast and in the New York City area for the rest of the Spanish–American War, which ended on 12 August 1898. With the war over, she was decommissioned on 14 September 1898.

Elfrida was recommissioned on 29 April 1899 and loaned to the Connecticut Naval Militia to train United States Naval Reserve personnel. She was transferred to the New Jersey Militia in 1900, but in 1902 returned to her duties with the Connecticut Naval Militia. She was returned to the Navy and decommissioned on 27 June 1908.

In 1909, the Navy loaned Elfrida to the North Carolina Naval Militia. She arrived at New Bern, North Carolina, on 26 July 1909 and was recommissioned on 20 August 1909.

After the United States entered World War I on 6 April 1917, Elfrida was returned to the Navy, which gave her the section patrol number 988 and put her into service as the section patrol boat USS Elfrida (SP-988). Assigned to the 5th Naval District, she was placed in charge of a fleet of Navy motorboats tending the submarine nets at the York River Upper Barrier in Virginia. During a voyage from Norfolk, Virginia, to Yorktown, Virginia, an accidental explosion on board Elfrida killed one man and seriously injured two others on 25 August 1917. Elfrida‘s plans and those of 207 other Holling & Hollingsworth built vessels, are in the collection of the Mariners’ Museum Library in Newport News.

== Disposal ==
The Navy ordered Elfrida to be demobilized at the end of 1917. She was decommissioned for the last time on 31 March 1918 and sold on 11 May 1918.
