= Alaska Wing Civil Air Patrol =

Highest echelon of Alaska Civil Air Patrol

- Alaska Wing of Civil Air Patrol

Associated branches
- United States Air Force

Command staff
- Commander: Col Derk A. MacPherson
- Deputy Commander: Maj John Nealon
- Chief of Staff: Lt Col Stephen Sammons

Current statistics
- Cadets: 359
- Seniors: 502
- Total Membership: 861
- Website: akwg.cap.gov
- Statistics as of 2026

Alaska Wing of Civil Air Patrol (CAP) is the highest echelon of Civil Air Patrol in the state of Alaska. Alaska Wing headquarters are located in Joint Base Elmendorf–Richardson. Alaska Wing consists of over 700 cadet and adult members at 16 locations across the state of Alaska.

== Mission ==
Civil Air Patrol has three primary missions: providing emergency services; providing cadet programs for youth; and providing aerospace education.

=== Emergency services ===
Civil Air Patrol provides emergency services, including: search and rescue missions; disaster relief, including providing air and ground transportation of emergency supplies and disaster relief officials to disaster areas; humanitarian services, including the transport of blood and human tissue; Air Force support; and counter-drug operations.

=== Cadet programs ===
Cadets aged 12 to 21 may participate in a 16-step cadet program which includes aerospace education, leadership training, physical fitness and moral leadership.

=== Aerospace education ===
CAP provides education for both CAP members and the general public; internal training is provided to cadets and senior members through the CAP program, while education is provided to the general public through workshops conducted through the education system.

== Organization ==
Alaska Wing is divided into sixteen squadrons, which report to the headquarters located at Joint Base Elmendorf–Richardson.

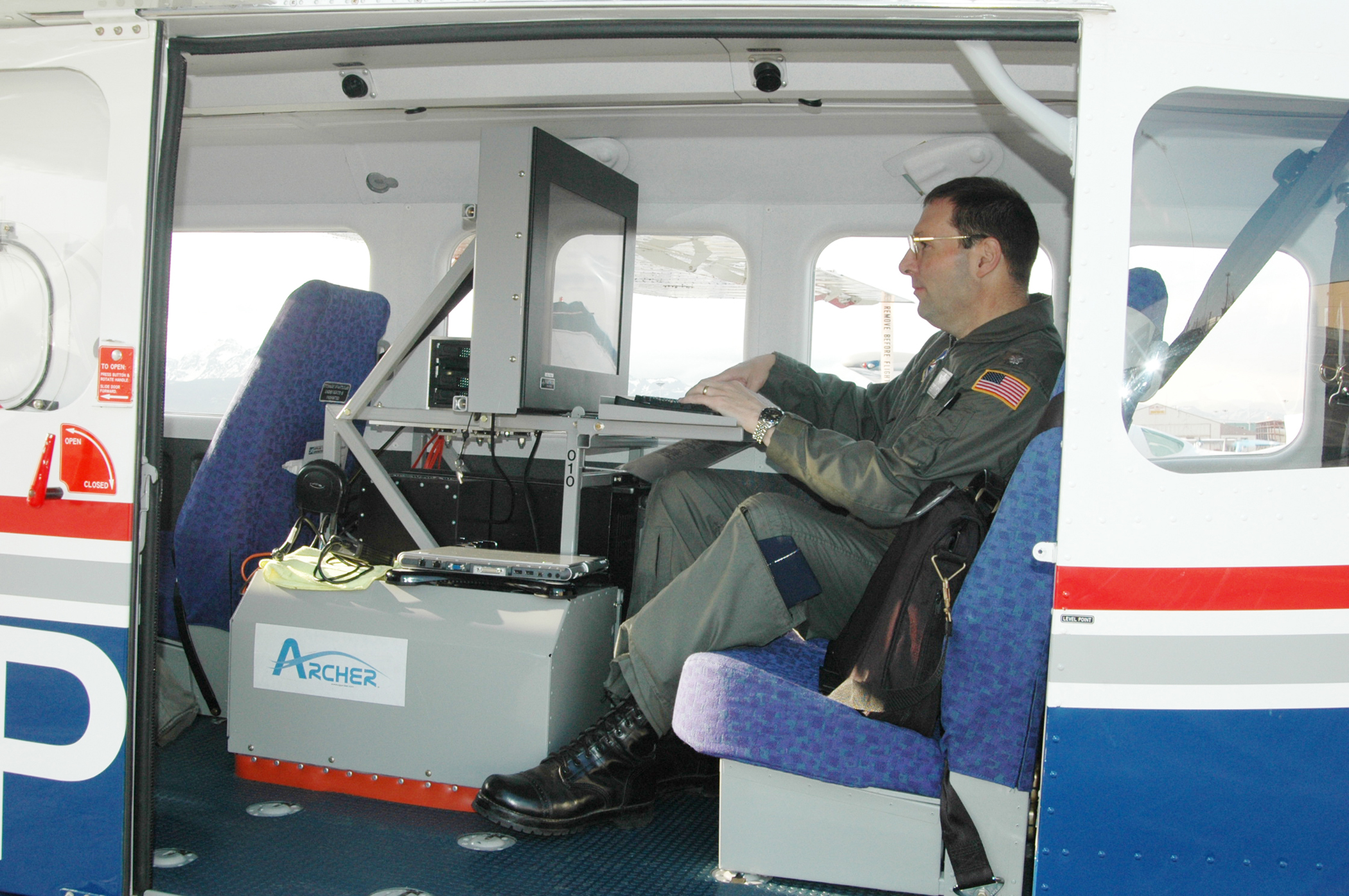
Lt. Col. Stuart Goering, Alaska Civil Air Patrol Wing, prepares an external hard drive for the ARCHER system before a May 15 Alaska Shield/Northern Edge mission mapping the Alaskan Pipeline.

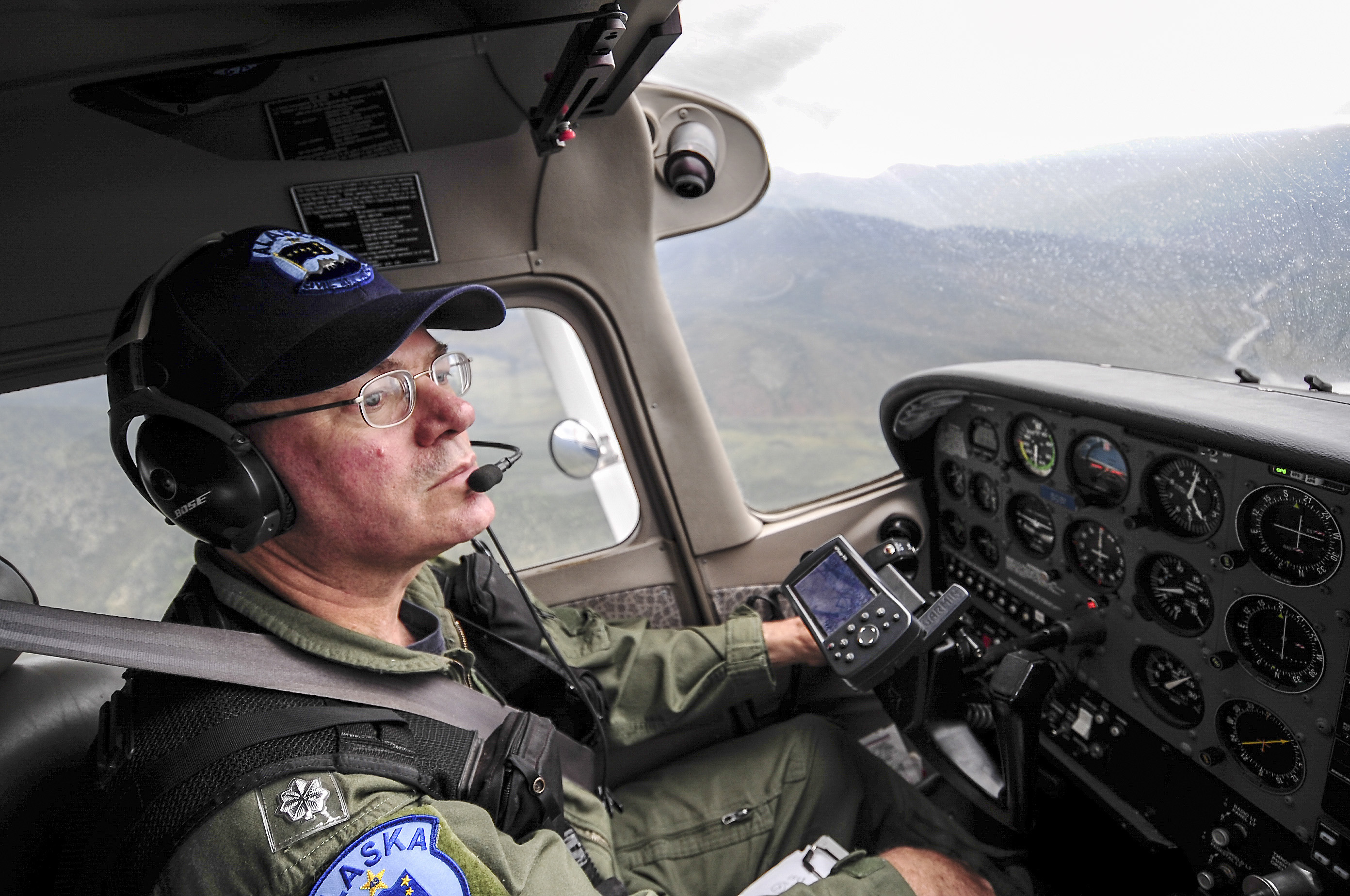
Mark Biron, Civil Air Patrol 71st Composite Squadron member, pilots a CAP Cessna 172 over the Joint Pacific Alaska Range Complex.

Squadrons of the Alaska Wing
Designation	Squadron Name	Location	Notes
AK001	Alaska Wing Headquarters Squadron	Joint Base Elmendorf–Richardson	
AK009	Ninth Composite Squadron	Fairbanks	
AK010	Homer Cadet Squadron	Homer	
AK011	Kenai Composite Squadron	Kenai	
AK015	Anchorage Polaris Composite Squadron	Anchorage	
AK017	17th Composite Squadron	Joint Base Elmendorf–Richardson	
AK022	Juneau Southeast Composite Squadron	Juneau	
AK025	Seward Cadet Flight	Seward	Closed
AK027	Delta Composite Squadron	Delta Junction	
AK065	Baranof Composite Squadron	Sitka	Closed
AK066	Bethel Composite Squadron	Bethel	Closed
AK068	Bristol Bay Flight	King Salmon	
AK071	Eielson 71st Composite Squadron	Eielson Air Force Base	
AK072	Valdez Composite Squadron	Valdez	
AK073	Wasilla Cadet Squadron	Wasilla	
AK076	Birchwood Composite Squadron	Chugiak	
AK085	Tok Composite Squadron	Tok	
AK087	Kodiak Island Composite Squadron	Kodiak	
AK091	Gateway Composite Squadron	Ketchikan	Closed
AK092	Yukon Composite Squadron	Galena	Closed
AK093	Lake Hood Cadet Squadron	Anchorage	
AK999	Alaska State Legislative Squadron	Joint Base Elmendorf–Richardson	

== See also ==
- Alaska Air National Guard
- Alaska Naval Militia
- Alaska State Defense Force
