= Alaska Naval Militia =

State-provided naval militia for Alaska

- The Alaska Naval Militia insignia
- Active: 1984 – Present
- Country: United States
- Allegiance: Alaska
- Type: Naval militia
- Role: Military reserve force
- Part of: Alaska Department of Military and Veterans Affairs
- Website: Alaska Naval Militia Official Website

The Alaska Naval Militia (AKNM) is the official naval militia of the state of Alaska. The Alaska Naval Militia falls under control of the State of Alaska. The legal basis for the naval militia comes from both federal and state law.

== History ==
The Alaska Naval Militia was originally established in 1970, but was retracted in 1972 for nearly a decade until it was reestablished in 1984. In 1989, the AKNM was deployed to assist in recovery operations after the Exxon Valdez oil spill. In 2019, members of the Alaska Naval Militia were deployed to help fight the Swan Lake Fire in southern Alaska. In March 2020, the Alaska Naval Militia was called to action in response to the COVID-19 epidemic.

In 1968, the US Navy was to stand down from Alaska and Arctic Operations. The 13th Naval District and Kodiak Naval Station were slated for closure. NAS Adak will be moved to caretaker status.

The US was enacting a 200-mile Offshore Zone; continued foreign fishery incursions into Alaska fishing waters occurred.

To address these challenges, Governor Hickel tasked Major General C.F Necrason, The Adjutant General, to provide a feasibility assessment of commissioning an Alaska Naval Militia.

Several other States operated active naval militias at the time. The oldest continuous operating state naval militia was in New York. New York Naval Militia leadership suggested contacting the US Navy to secure Title 10 recognition for an Alaska Naval Militia.

Inquiries to the 17th Naval District, then responsible for Navy Reserve operations in the northwest, determined that to receive Title 10 recognition, the militia would be required to be 95% Navy or Marine Corps reservists. As Alaska had no organized Navy Reserve program at the time, Title 10 recognition would not be forthcoming.

The Alaska legislature considered CSSB 248 and enacted AS 26.05.010 establishing the Alaska Naval Militia as part of the Alaska Militia.

In February 1968, there was correspondence from Alaska US Senator Ernst Gruening contacting the Secretary of Navy Paul H. Ignatius. The inquiry asked about establishing a Naval Reserve Program in Alaska.

On September 5, 1969, The CNO directed 17th Naval District to establish Naval Reserve Facility Anchorage.

On March 20, 1970, the Alaska Naval Militia was established. LT W. Shoemaker was appointed commanding officer.

The New Naval Reserve Facility OIC replied to the adjutant general declining to man the Alaska Naval Militia.

In March 1972, the Alaska Department of Military Affairs disestablished the Alaska Naval Militia.

In September 1984, Governor Bill Sheffield directed adjutant general Major General Edward Pagano to establish the Alaska Naval Militia. September 05, 1984, was proclaimed Naval Militia Day. Commissioning ceremonies were held at Kulis ANG Base. Captain Dan Ketchum was appointed commander. ANM members included US Naval Reserve and US Marine Corps Reserve personnel.

The sources for the above are ANM vertical files and correspondence.

== Alaska Naval Militia Commanders ==
CAPT Daniel Ketchum, USN	1984-1986
RDML AK Thomas Straugh, ANM	1987-1998
CAPT Michele Stickney, USN	1998-2006
CDR Dale Hartman, USN	2006-2009
CAPT Roger Motzko, USN	2009-2015
CDR Jennifer Avery, USN	2015-2021
RDML AK Jason Woodward, ANM	2022-2025
RDML AK James Nigh, ANM	2025-

== Duties ==
The AKNM has focused on four mission areas:

- Medical: Comprehensive medical support, provided by medical, nursing, and paramedical personnel.
- Explosive outload team: Specialized cargo handling, with an emphasis on ordnance, provided by trained stevedores, cargo handlers, and safety officers.
- Reconnaissance: Route reconnaissance and port security, provided by Marines trained in SOF skills and associated field corpsmen.
- Naval construction: Tactical construction, security support, and basic services operations, provided by construction personnel and engineers.

== Membership ==
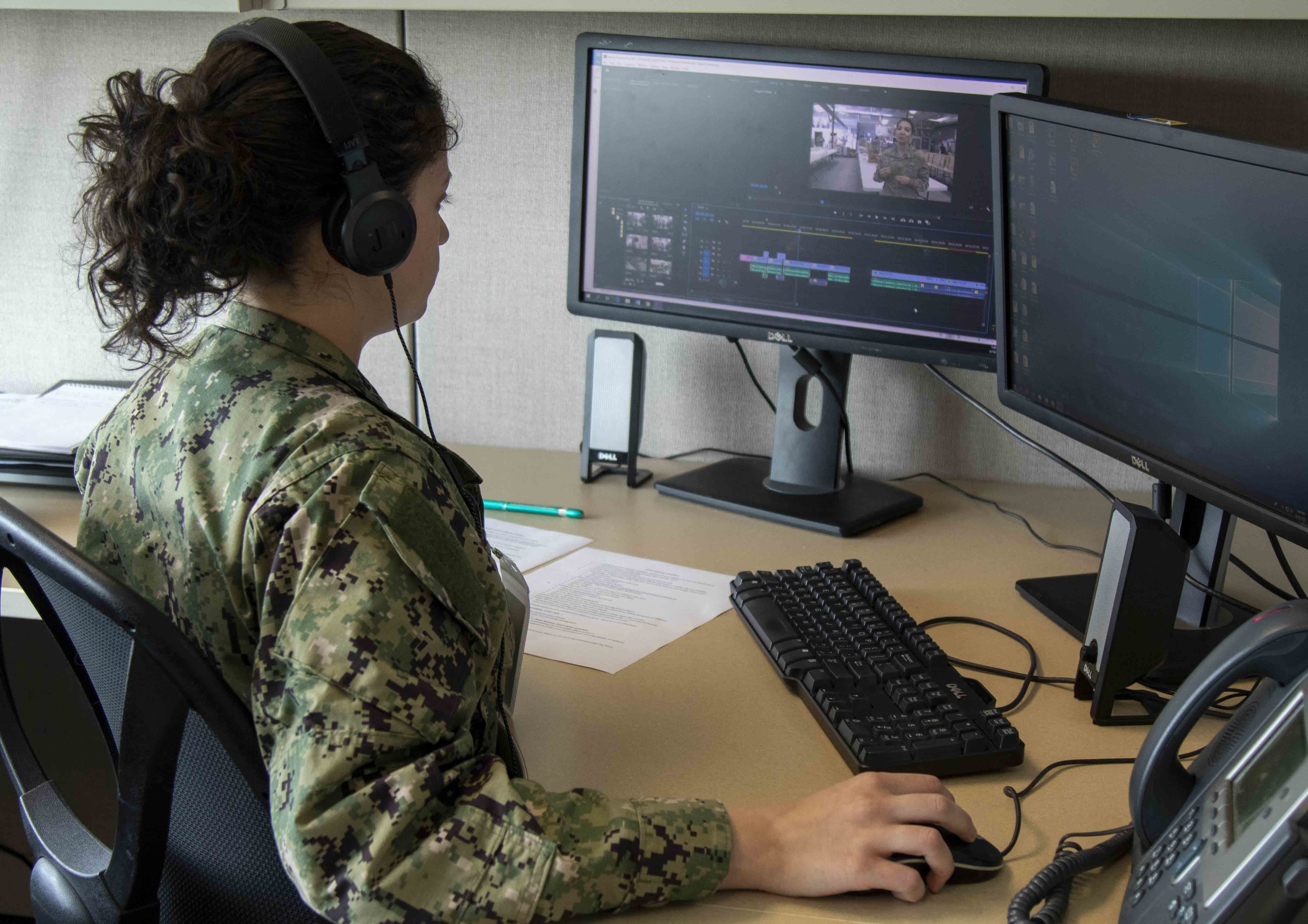
A member of the Alaska Naval Militia edits video footage she took as public affairs coverage of COVID-19 response efforts from the Alaska National Guard, Alaska State Defense Force and the Alaska Naval Militia.

Unlike state defense forces, naval militias are partially regulated and equipped by the federal government, and as such, membership requirements are in part dictated by federal rules. Under 10 U.S. Code § 8904, in order to be eligible for federal aid, at least 95% of members of the naval militia must also be members of the United States Navy Reserve or the United States Marine Corps Reserve. As such, Alaska law requires that membership be limited to members of the United States Naval Reserve or the United States Marine Corps Reserve.

== Equipment ==
Under federal law, the naval militias of each state may be loaned or given vessels, arms, and equipment from the United States Navy and Marine Corps, and have use of facilities made available to the Navy Reserve and Marine Corps Reserve under regulations prescribed by the Secretary of the Navy.

== Legal protection ==
Employers in Alaska are required by law to grant an unpaid leave of absence to any employee who is a member of the Alaska Naval Militia, and who is activated to perform active state service. The employer must also guarantee the employee's right to return to his or her employment position upon that employee's return from deployment.

== See also ==
- Alaska National Guard
- Alaska State Defense Force
- Alaska Wing Civil Air Patrol
- United States Coast Guard Auxiliary
