= Alaska Department of Military and Veterans Affairs =

State department of Alaska managing National Guard, state militia, and related affairs

The Alaska Department of Military and Veterans Affairs manages military and veterans affairs for the government of Alaska. It comprises a number of subdepartments, including the Alaska National Guard, Veterans Affairs, the Division of Homeland Security and Emergency Management, Alaska Naval Militia, and others.

== Alaska National Guard ==
The Alaska National Guard is Alaska's component of the National Guard of the United States and comprises the Alaska Army National Guard and the Alaska Air National Guard. As of 2025, the strength of the Alaska National Guard is 1,190 army guardsmen and 1,676 air guardsmen.

The Governor may call individuals or units of the Alaska National Guard into state service during emergencies or to assist in special situations which lend themselves to use of the National Guard. The state mission assigned to the National Guard is "To provide trained and disciplined forces for domestic emergencies or as otherwise provided by state law." The Alaska Army National Guard also operates a launch site for a U.S. anti-missile system at Fort Greely, about 100 miles south of Fairbanks.

The military department's Alaska Military Youth Academy is run by the National Guard.

== Alaska State Defense Force ==
The Alaska State Defense Force (ASDF) is a military entity authorized by both the State Code of Alaska and Executive Order. The State Defense Force (SDF) is the state's authorized militia and assumes the state mission of the Alaska National Guard in the event the Guard is mobilized. It is separate from the National Guard and reports to the Governor of Alaska as ex officio commander. The SDF is composed of retired active and reserve military personnel and selected professional persons who volunteer their time and talents in further service to their state.

== Alaska Naval Militia ==
The Alaska Naval Militia is Alaska's naval equivalent of the Army and Air National Guard. It is composed of members of the Navy Reserve and Marine Corps Reserve members who, like the National Guard, have a dual federal and state obligation; they serve as state military forces unless called into federal service.

== Department heads ==
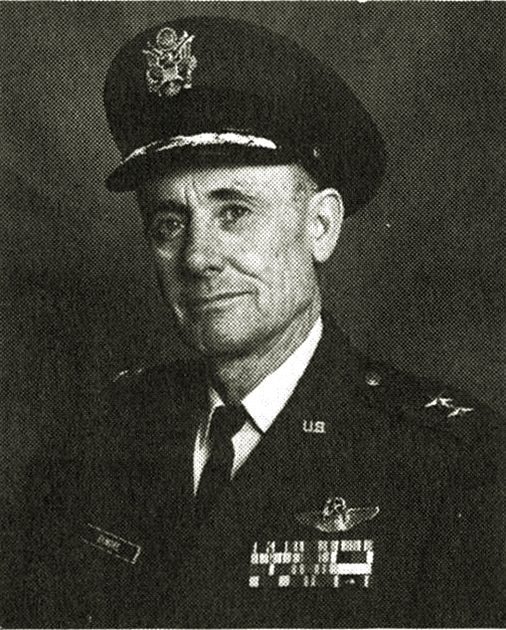
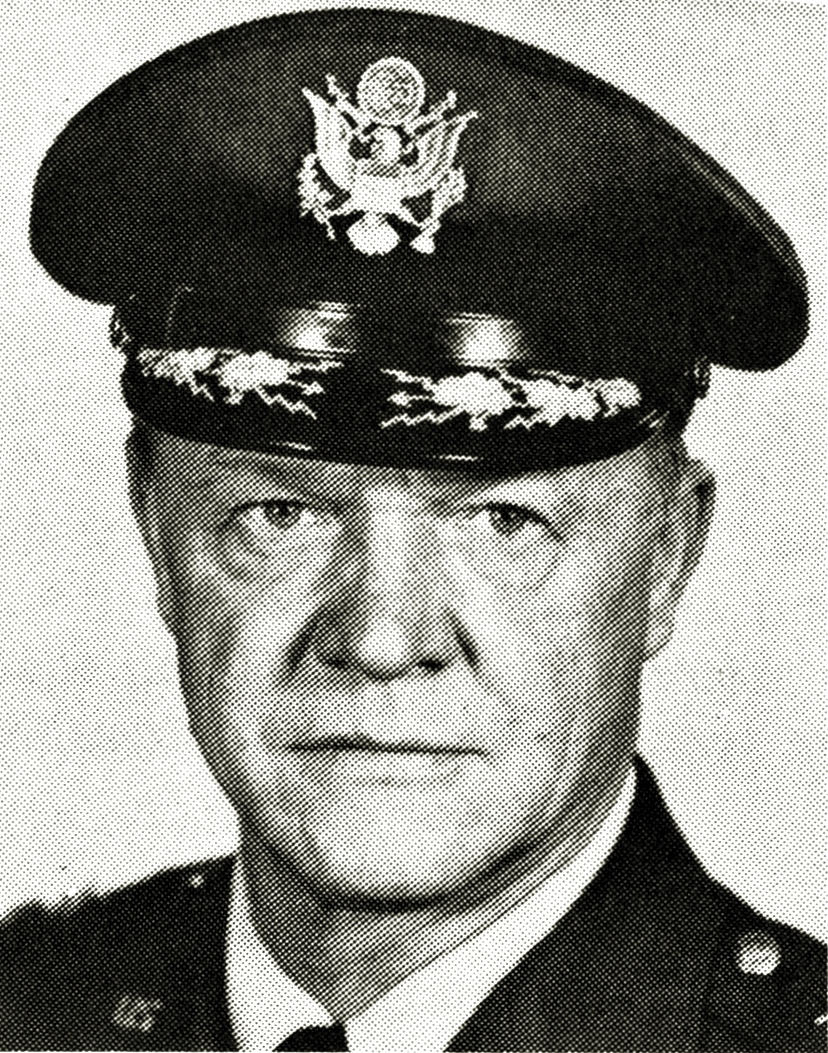
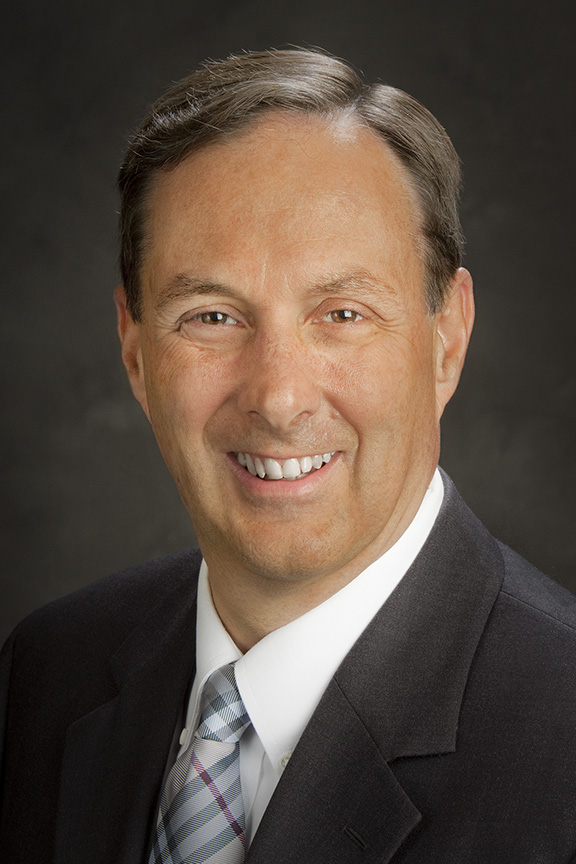
The department's head is known as the adjutant general of Alaska. Past adjutants general include (from left): William Elmore (1964–1967 and 1971–1973), C. F. Necrason (1967–1971 and 1974–1982) and Craig Campbell (2002–2009).
