= Indiana Naval Militia =

Naval militia of Indiana

The Indiana Naval Militia (INM) is the currently inactive naval militia of Indiana. Along with the Indiana National Guard and the Indiana Guard Reserve, the Indiana Naval Militia is a component of the military forces of Indiana. Like the members of the National Guard, the Navy Reserve and Marine Corps Reserve personnel who make up the membership of the various naval militias have a dual federal and state status, operating as a part of their state's military forces unless called into federal service, at which time they are relieved from their state obligations and placed under federal control until they are released from active service. However, unlike the National Guard, which is activated and deployed as an entire unit, naval militia personnel are activated as individuals and deployed within the ranks of their respective reserve components. Therefore, only members of the naval militia are activated under federal service, while the naval militia itself is never federalized as a unit.

== History ==
The Indiana Naval Militia was first organized on 7 August 1909. The members of the First Battalion, Indiana Naval Militia were students at the Culver Military Academy who were nonetheless given full military status and participated in drills with naval militia from other states, serving aboard the USS Alabama during a drill in 1914. However, after the passage of a Naval Militia bill on 16 February 1916, the unit was mustered out of service due to the young ages of its members. The Indiana Naval Militia was re-established in 1927, and by 1929 had established units in Indianapolis and Michigan City.

== Personnel ==
Naval militias are partially regulated and equipped by the federal government, and therefore membership requirements are partially set according to federal standards. Under 10 U.S. Code § 7854, in order to be eligible for access to "vessels, material, armament, equipment, and other facilities of the Navy and the Marine Corps available to the Navy Reserve and the Marine Corps Reserve", at least 95% of members of the naval militia must also be members of the United States Navy Reserve or the United States Marine Corps Reserve.

== Legal status ==
Naval militias of U.S. states are recognized by the federal government of the United States under 10 U.S. Code §7851. Indiana law also recognizes the Indiana Naval Militia as a component of the military forces of Indiana. Therefore, an act of legislature by the Indiana General Assembly or an executive order from the governor of Indiana could return the Indiana Naval Militia to active service.
