= Alaska State Defense Force =

The Alaska State Defense Force
- The Alaska State Defense Force Insignia
- Active: 1984–2008, 2016–present
- Country: United States
- Allegiance: Alaska
- Type: State defense force
- Role: Military reserve force
- Part of: Alaska Department of Military and Veterans Affairs
- Garrison/HQ: Joint Base Elmendorf–Richardson, Alaska
- Website: dmva.alaska.gov/asdf

Commanders
- Civilian leadership: Governor Mike Dunleavy
- State military leadership: Brigadier General Simon Brown

The Alaska State Defense Force (ASDF) is the state defense force of Alaska. It is one of 18 such forces in the United States. The Alaska State Defense Force is administered under the Alaska Department of Military and Veterans Affairs, but is headed by a commander who reports directly to the governor of Alaska, who acts as commander-in-chief of the state defense force.

== History ==
The Alaska State Defense Force is the successor of the Alaska Territorial Guard founded during World War II. With the conclusion of the war and Alaska's inauguration as a state in 1959, the Territorial Guard was disbanded but soon replaced by a state militia established by state statute. In 1984, the Alaska State Guard was formed; it was renamed in 1987 as the Alaska State Defense Force. In 2004, the name 49th Military Police Brigade (49th MP BDE) was also adopted for it. A later realignment of the command's structure has utilized the new designation of 49th Readiness Brigade (Separate), but the unit is still mainly known as the Alaska State Defense Force.

The ASDF structure was primarily composed of military police units. The units operated with mostly state certified constables under the Alaska Police Standards Council. By statute, the Alaska State Defense Force must be made up of no less than 75 percent former military personnel.

Following the September 11 attacks, the ASDF was tasked with guarding critical oil infrastructure against attack.

Unlike most of the state defense forces in the United States, Alaska State Guardsmen trained and certified with firearms in order to achieve proficiency to carry firearms when activated. However, in 2008, following an investigation of the leadership of Brigadier General Thomas Westall, then serving as the head of the ASDF, Governor Sarah Palin ordered the ASDF to disarm. The current structure of the ASDF is as a Readiness Brigade composed of readiness battalions. The military police (MP) function is in abeyance until needed by the Adjutant General for Alaska.

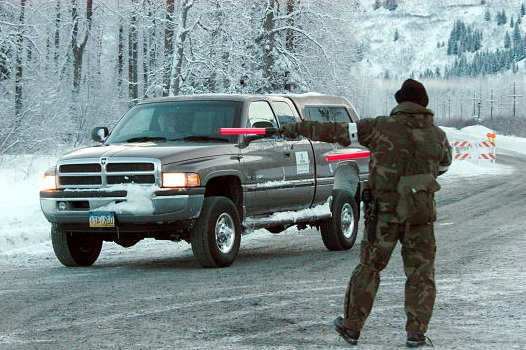
An Alaska State Guardsman directing traffic.

In 2016, Governor Bill Walker announced his intention to reform the Alaska State Defense Force by expanding it further into rural Alaska, bringing the level of training closer to that of the National Guard, and creating a signal detachment. On 14 January 2016, the Alaska State Defense Force activated the 2nd Signal Detachment, a component of the 49th Brigade. On 15 September, 2017, the Alaska State Defense Force activated a Scout Detachment in the Native Village of Kwethluk. In 2017, Alaska State Defense Force members, in their first ever deployment outside of the state, provided support to relief efforts in Puerto Rico alongside Alaska National Guardsmen after Hurricane Maria and Irma caused extensive damage to the island. State and National Guardsmen provided communications support at a Joint Incident Site Communications Capability system.

In March 2018, the Alaska State Defense Force took part in an international training exercise, working directly with their Canadian counterparts, the Canadian Rangers, in a combined domain awareness capacity drill.

In April 2020, members of the Alaska State Defense Force were activated to assist in Alaska's response to the COVID-19 pandemic. Members worked at an Anchorage warehouse to help organize personal protective equipment and other supplies from the national stockpile and putting them into loads for shipment. Members also helped distribute declaration forms for people entering the state who must quarantine themselves.

== Duties ==
The mission of the Alaska State Defense Force (ASDF) is to maintain an organized, trained military force capable of timely and effective response to state emergencies, or, on other occasions deemed appropriate by the Governor, to provide military assistance to civil and military authorities in the preservation of life, property, and public safety. Previous missions assigned to the ASDF have included manning a security checkpoint on the Dalton Highway, traffic control after a Valdez-area landslide, and safeguarding flooded homes in Houston against looters. ASDF has conducted joint operations with local city and state agencies as well as federal entities, including the U.S. military as well as government agencies such as the Federal Bureau of Investigation, United States Department of Homeland Security, and the Bureau of Alcohol, Tobacco, Firearms and Explosives.

The unit missions to date have included Operation Winter Talon, avalanche rescue, Kenai Peninsula floods and the Big Lake fire. ASDF members have worked at the Iditarod Trail Sled Dog Race restarts. Some members have been detailed to work with the Alaska Railroad police as well as local police departments.

== Membership ==
Alaska state statute AS 26.05.010 established the Alaska Militia. It declares: "The militia of the state [of Alaska] consists of all able-bodied citizens of the United States and all other able-bodied persons who have declared their intention to become citizens of the United States, who reside in the state [of Alaska], who are at least 17 years of age, and who are eligible for military service under the laws of the United States or this state [of Alaska]." The ASDF is constituted as a cadre of experienced officers and enlisted personnel which is ready to organize the entire population, if need be. The ASDF benefits from the experience of its personnel. Many of them have technical skills in such areas as medicine, communications and logistics. It is a volunteer force which contains the skills necessary for operations in time of disaster.

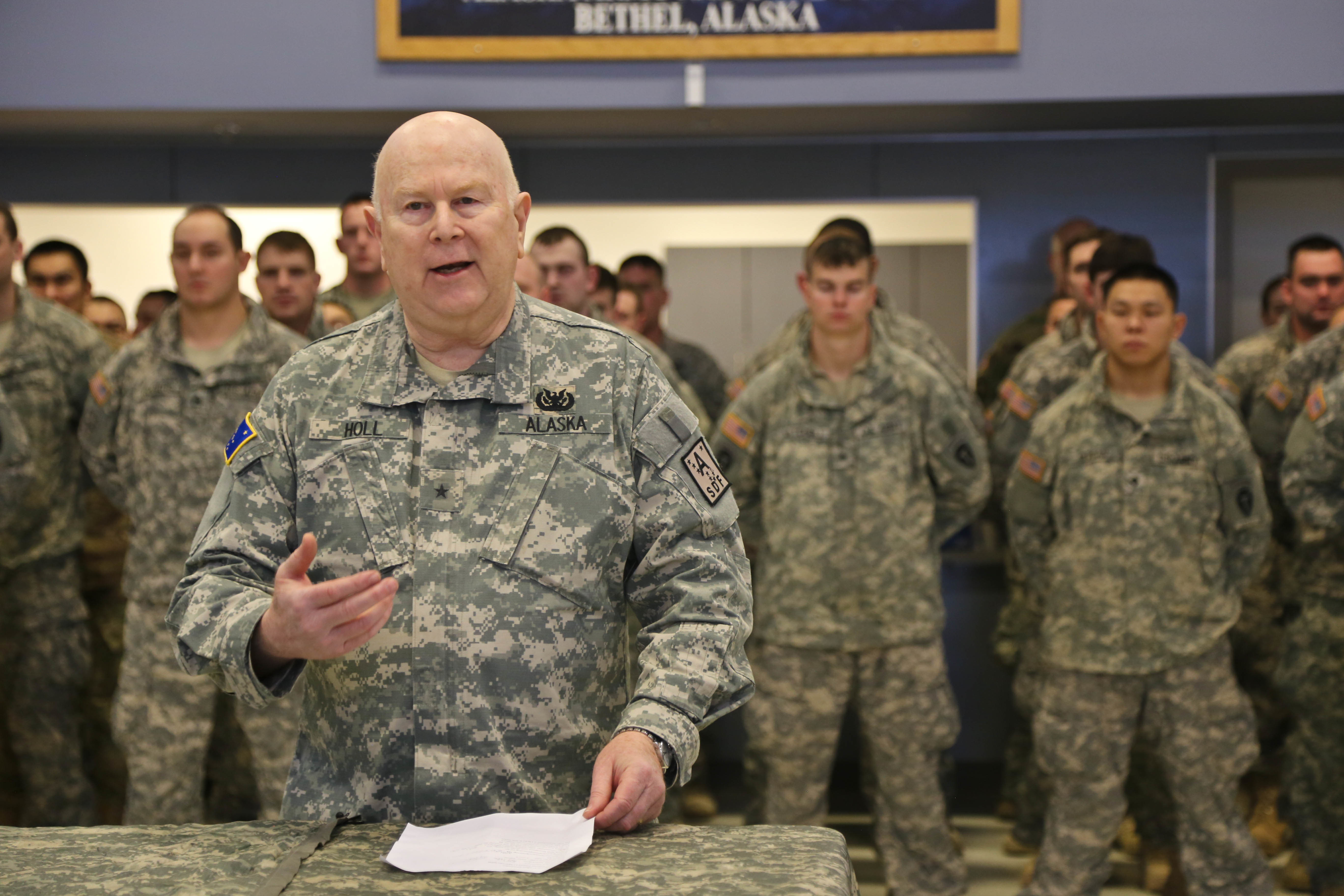
Brig. Gen. (Alaska) Roger Holl, commander of the Alaska State Defense Force, speaks at a stand-up ceremony establishing the Bethel-based ASDF unit.

== Uniform ==
The unit wears United States Army uniforms in accordance with the AR 670-1.

== Organization ==
The 49th Readiness Brigade Alaska State Defense Force consists of a Brigade Headquarters, and two regional Battalions (2nd Scout Battalion - headquartered in Bethel (with detachments throughout western Alaska), and the 2nd Special Troops Battalion - headquartered in Wasilla). The 2nd Special Troops Battalion consists of four companies (a military police company, a signal company, an engineer company, and a forward support company), with each company having detachments throughout the central and eastern portions of the state.

In the past... The battalions below the Headquarters Element include a medical detachment, waterborne operators, and an aviation detachment. The AK SDF has its own academy in which individuals are brought up to State training standards to be Constables. The headgear worn varies on mission requirements.

== Government support ==
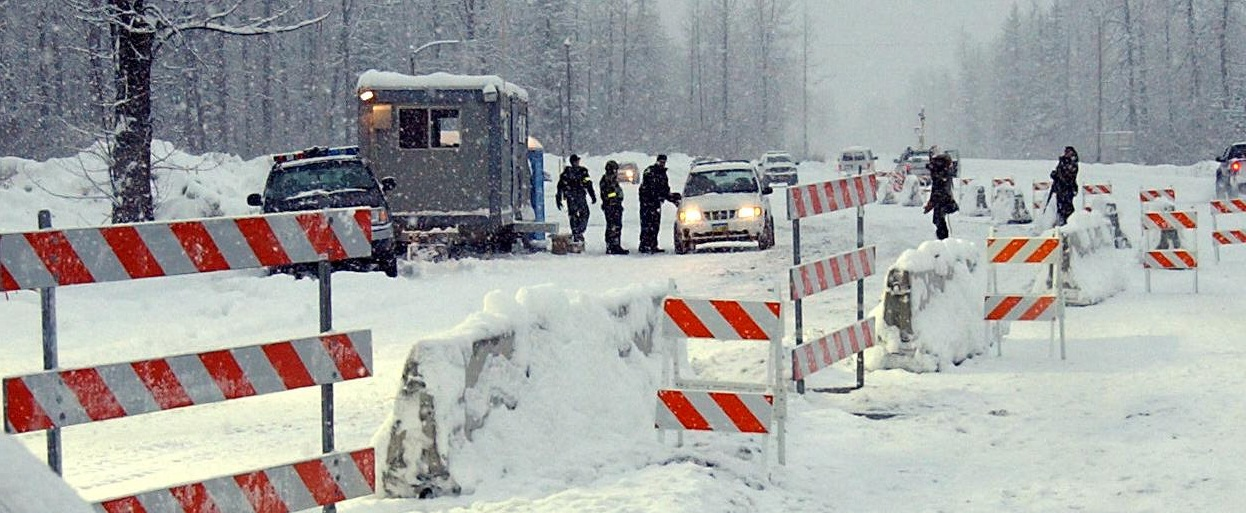
Alaska State Defense Force, Alaska National Guard, and Alaska Troopers man a checkpoint.

Issues of funding, mission and the bearing of arms are listed among common complaints and stumbling blocks associated with unit effectiveness. ASDF, when colocated with the Alaska National Guard, was careful to never utilize federal resources to accomplish its mission. In 2009, the Brigade Headquarters and 2 of its battalion headquarters were relocated from the National Guard Headquarters on Joint Base Elmendorf-Richardson to the National Guard Alcantra Armory in Wasilla. Since then, the Alaska State Defense Force has been pressed more with less limitations as well as capabilities, equipment, and activations. With the recent reliefs of command, starting in 2016, of the high-ranking officers of the Alaska National Guard including the Adjutant General (MG Thomas Katkus) who was against the expansion of the State Defense Force, there is a possibility that the ASDF will be able to re-obtain previous capabilities and more as the new Command is supportive of them.

== Legal protection ==
Employers in Alaska are required by law to grant an unpaid leave of absence to any employee who is a member of the Alaska State Defense Force, and who is activated to perform active state service. The employer must also guarantee the employee's right to return to their employment position upon that employee's return from deployment.

== See also ==
- Alaska Naval Militia
- Alaska Wing Civil Air Patrol
