= North Carolina Naval Militia =

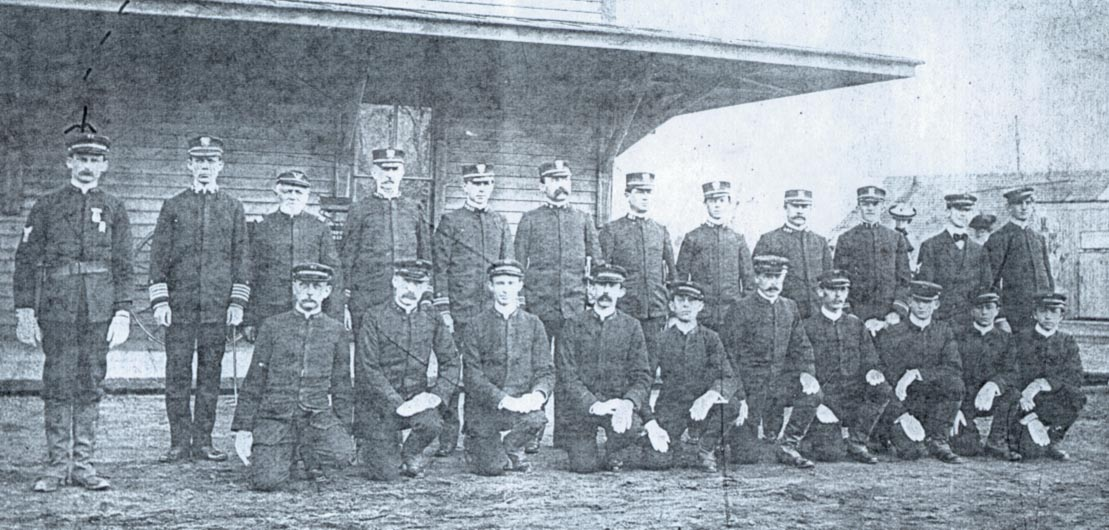
North Carolina Naval Militia, Elizabeth City Detachment.

The North Carolina Naval Militia is the inactive naval militia of North Carolina. The naval militia, along with the North Carolina National Guard, the North Carolina State Defense Militia, and the historic military commands, is a component of the organized militia of North Carolina.

== History ==
The naval forces of North Carolina were originally organized as the North Carolina State Navy during the American Revolutionary War The state of North Carolina commissioned three ships: the Washington, the Pennsylvania Farmer, and the King Tammany.

The USS Nantucket was transferred to the North Carolina Naval Militia in 1895. During the Spanish–American War, the Nantucket and its crew were sent to guard the city of Port Royal, South Carolina. By 1910, the naval militia consisted of two battalions. In 1915, the naval militia first drilled aboard a battleship, and practiced using 3-inch guns.

== Personnel ==
Naval militias are recognized under federal law and are equipped by the federal government, and therefore, membership requirements are partially set according to federal standards. Under 10 U.S. Code § 7854, in order to be eligible for access to "vessels, material, armament, equipment, and other facilities of the Navy and the Marine Corps available to the Navy Reserve and the Marine Corps Reserve", at least 95% of members of the naval militia must also be members of the United States Navy Reserve or the United States Marine Corps Reserve. Officers of the United States Navy and Marine Corps may be appointed by the governor as officers of the naval militia.

== Legal status ==
Naval militias of U.S. states are legally defined as part of the organized militia of the United States under 10 U.S. Code §7851. North Carolina law recognizes the North Carolina Naval Militia as a component of the organized militia of North Carolina. Therefore, although inactive, an act of legislature by the North Carolina General Assembly would return the North Carolina Naval Militia to active service. The Governor of North Carolina has the authority to appoint officers of the United States Navy and Marine Corps as officers of the naval militia, so the governor maintains authority to reactivate the naval militia through executive order.
