= USS Nantucket (1862) =

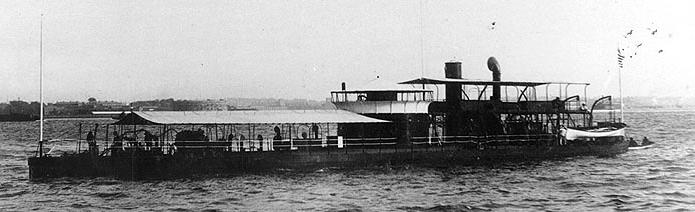

History

United States
- Builder: Atlantic Iron Works
- Launched: 6 December 1862
- Commissioned: 26 February 1863
- Decommissioned: 24 June 1865
- Renamed: USS Medusa, 15 June 1869; USS Nantucket, 10 August 1869
- Fate: Sold, 14 November 1900

General characteristics
- Class & type: Passaic-class monitor
- Displacement: 1,875 tons
- Length: 200 ft (61 m) overall
- Beam: 46 ft (14 m)
- Draft: 10 ft 6 in (3.20 m)
- Propulsion: 2 Martin boilers, 1-shaft Ericsson vibrating lever engine, 320 ihp (235 kW)
- Speed: 7 knots
- Complement: 75 officers and enlisted
- Armament: 1 × 15 in (381 mm) smoothbore; 1 × 11 in (279 mm) Dahlgren smoothbore
- Armor: Iron; Side: 5 – 3 in (12.7 – 7.6 cm); Turret: 11 in (27.9 cm); Deck: 1 in (2.5 cm)

The first USS Nantucket was a Passaic-class coastal monitor in the United States Navy.

Nantucket was launched 6 December 1862 by Atlantic Iron Works, Boston, Massachusetts; and commissioned 26 February 1863, Commander Donald McNeil Fairfax in command.

Assigned to the South Atlantic Blockading Squadron, Nantucket participated in the attack on Confederate forts in Charleston Harbor 7 April 1863. Struck 51 times during the valiant but unsuccessful assault on the vital Southern port, the single-turreted monitor was repaired at Port Royal but returned to Charleston to support Army operations on Morris Island, engaging Fort Wagner 16, 17, 18, and 24 July. She captured British steamer Jupiter at sea 15 September. She again challenged the Charleston Harbor forts 14 May 1864 and thereafter remained on blockade duty through the end of the American Civil War.

Decommissioned at Philadelphia Navy Yard 24 June 1865, she remained in ordinary there for a decade. Renamed Medusa 15 June 1869, she resumed the name Nantucket 10 August 1869. Transferred to Portsmouth Navy Yard in Kittery, Maine, in 1875, Nantucket twice briefly recommissioned 29 July to 12 December 1882 and 16 June to 6 October 1884, and operated along the northern east coast. She lay in ordinary at New York until turned over to the North Carolina Naval Militia in 1895. During the Spanish–American War, Nantucket was stationed at Port Royal, South Carolina.

After being condemned as unfit for further service, Nantucket was sold at auction in Washington, D.C., on 14 November 1900. A total of five bids were received for the vessel, with the winning bid of $13,111 lodged by Thomas Butler & Co. of Boston. The auction is said to have attracted considerable public interest, due to the vessel's historic nature.
