= Indiana Guard Reserve =

State defense force of Indiana

- Emblem of the Indiana Guard Reserve
- Active: 1861–present
- Country: United States
- Allegiance: Indiana
- Type: State Defense Force
- Role: Military reserve force
- Part of: Military Department of Indiana
- Garrison/HQ: Indianapolis, Indiana
- Nickname: Griffins
- Website: Indiana Guard Reserve

Commanders
- Commander-In-Chief: Governor Mike Braun
- Adjutant General: Brigadier General (Note: BG Muennich holds the rank of BG with the ARNG, but holds a state level commission as a Major General (IN). His MG rank is not federally recognized as he has not been confirmed by Congress under Title 32.), ARNG Lawrence M. Muennich
- Commander, Indiana Guards Reserve: Colonel (IN) Douglas Johnson
- Command Sergeant Major, Indiana Guard Reserve: Command Sergeant Major (IN) Charles Brown

The Indiana Guard Reserve (IGR), formerly the Liberty Guard and the Indiana Legion, is the state defense force of the state of Indiana. The Indiana Guard Reserve serves under the exclusive authority of the governor of the State of Indiana through his executive agent for military matters, The Adjutant General of Indiana. The Guard Reserve is a unique military organization designed to supplement the Indiana National Guard and to defend Indiana if any part of the Indiana National Guard is in active federal service. The Indiana Guard Reserve also provides MEMS qualified soldiers who can augment Indiana Homeland Security missions and County Emergency Operations activities.

== Organization ==
The Indiana Guard Reserve is organized pursuant to Indiana Code IC 10-16-8. As of April 10, 2022 the Indiana Guard Reserve was reorganized into a brigade command structure by order of The Indiana Adjutant General. The Indiana National Guard 81st Troop Command will serve as the higher headquarters element for the Indiana Guard Reserve.

- Headquarters and Headquarters Detachment consists of the following:
  - The Command Group - Consists of the Commanding Officer as a colonel (O-6), the Executive Officer (O-5), and Senior Enlisted Advisor (E-9).
  - The Commander's Personal Staff, Special Staff, and Coordinating Staff.
  - Additional subordinate units will be announced through orders over a period of approximately one year.

== Purpose and missions ==
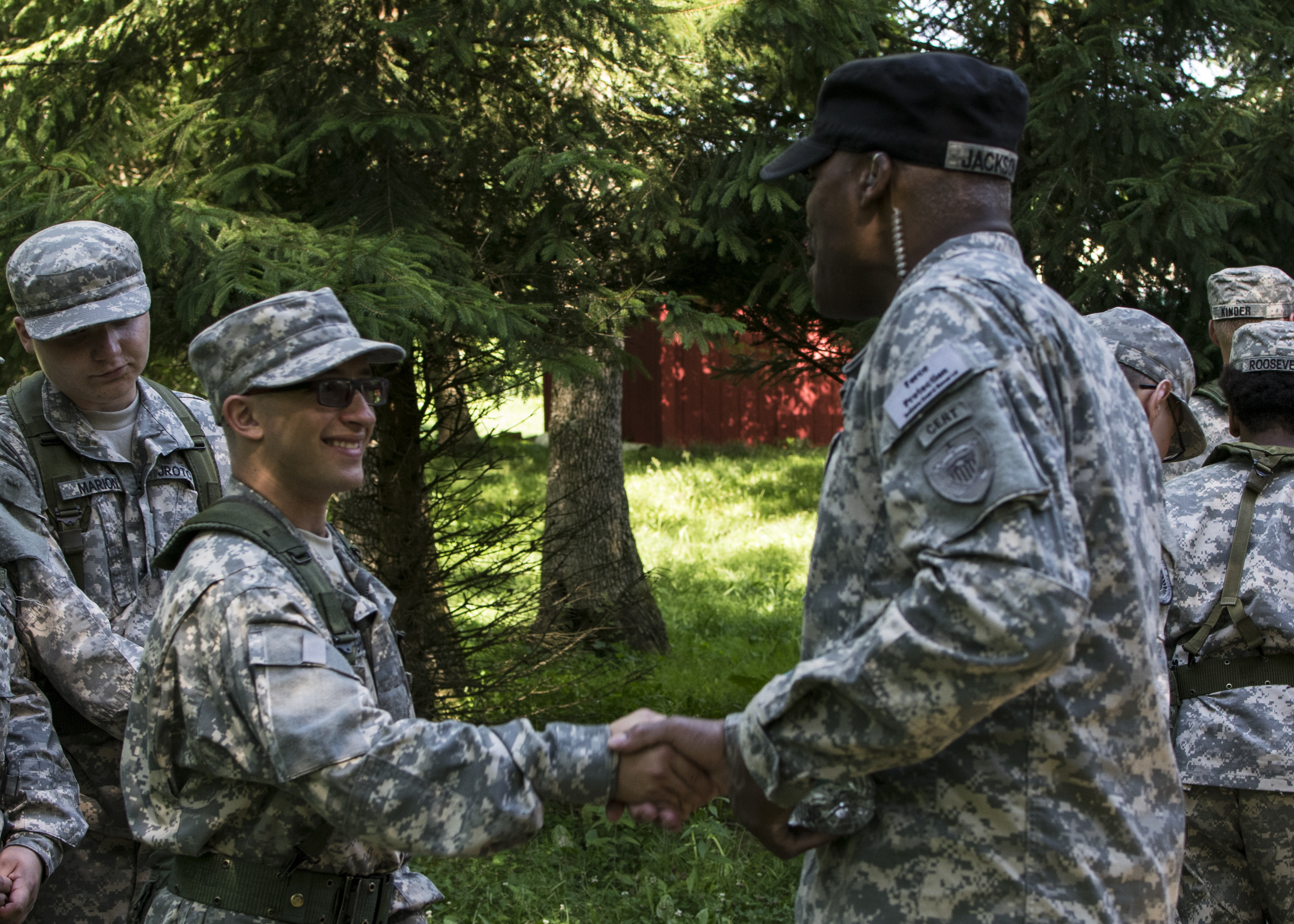
A member of the Indiana Guard Reserve shakes hands with a JROTC cadet during the JROTC Cadet Leaders Course at Camp Atterbury.

The purpose of any state defense force is to provide the governor of a state with a viable military force in case National Guard forces for that state have been mobilized into federal active service. The Indiana Guard Reserve has prepared for several missions if the Indiana National Guard is federalized.

Some of the missions performed by the IGR include:

- Soldier Support – Provides support to deploying or returning military personnel and civilian contractors during the deployment mobilization/demobilization process at Camp Atterbury, and hosting an annual, week-long Army JROTC leadership course;
- Incident Management – Provides emergency management training for state defense force members and civilian authority personnel, as well as internal qualification for INGR members;
- Community Emergency Response Teams – Provides education in disaster preparedness and basic response for members and civilians;
- Community Support – Provides support for community events, such as security and traffic control; and
- Armory Support – Provides security to Indiana National Guard armories during times when the INNG is deployed under federal orders.

== Training ==
The Indiana Guard Reserve offers specialized and general training to its members. Some examples of training offered either at state or local levels include:

- Military Emergency Management Specialist certification
- Cardiopulmonary Resuscitation (CPR) certification
- Basic First Aid certification
- Basic Military Training
- Basic and Advanced Non Commissioned Officer Training
- Basic and Advanced Officer Training

== Historic missions ==
The Indiana Guard Reserve has undertaken several missions in the past, including the following:

- Decontaminated and distributed medical equipment and supplies as a part of the COVID-19 pandemic response.
- Assisted Columbus Regional Hospital, Columbus, Indiana, with security after the flooding in June 2008.
- Assisted in providing security for Vice President Dick Cheney's visit to Camp Atterbury in Edinburgh, Indiana, in 2006
- Supplied trainers for Junior Reserve Officer's Training Corps (JROTC) Camp
- Assisted in mobilizing and demobilizing activated National Guard and Reserve troops for missions overseas at Camp Atterbury
- Assisted as guides for the American Veterans Traveling Tribute (The traveling Vietnam Wall) in Noblesville, Indiana
- Took part in Operation Allies Welcome

== History ==
Indiana's militia dates back to 1861 when it was first formed organized by Governor William Henry Harrison. During the American Civil War the Indiana Legion was created, giving the militia an official role in the state and distinguishing them from the regiments called to federal duty who would later become the Indiana National Guard. During the Civil War the Legion played a prominent role in the Newburgh Raid, fought in the Battle of Corydon, was active throughout Morgan's Raid into Indiana, and patrolled the state's southern border and protected areas of importance. The Legion was renamed the Liberty Guard in 1903 and served in various functions in the state. The Liberty Guard was renamed the Indiana Guard Reserve in 1916 and given a more formal role in the state.

== Air Wing ==
There was formerly an Air Wing of the IGR, which wore a slightly modified Air Force uniform. It was disbanded in the mid-1990s.

== Uniform ==
Personnel of the Guard Reserve are authorized to wear the US Army service uniform and the Army Combat Uniform, OCP pattern, when modifications that are distinctive to State Defense Forces are utilized.

== Decorations ==
The following ribbons are awarded to members of the Indiana Guard Reserve.

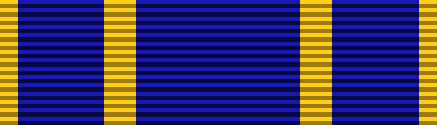
- Indiana Distinguished Service Cross (also National Guard)
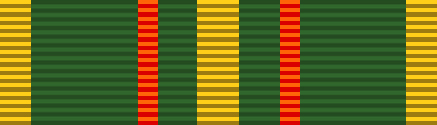
- Indiana Distinguished Service Medal (also National Guard)
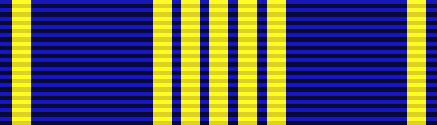
- Indiana Commendation Medal (National Guard & Guard Reserve)
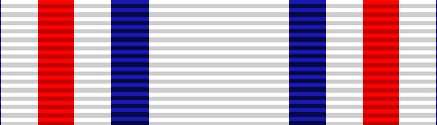
- Indiana Homeland Defense Ribbon
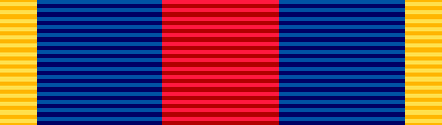
- Indiana Emergency Service Ribbon
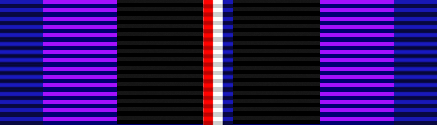
- Indiana Funeral Honors Ribbon
- IGR Merit Medal
- IGR Distinguished Service Ribbon
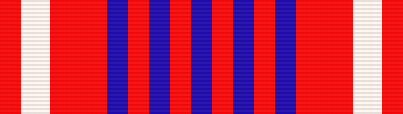
- IGR Commendation Ribbon
- IGR Achievement Ribbon
- IGR JROTC Commendation Ribbon
- IGR Outstanding Recruiter Ribbon
- IGR JROTC Support Ribbon
- IGR Community Service Ribbon
- IGR Search and Rescue Ribbon (Being Phased Out)
- IGR C.E.R.T. Ribbon
- IGR Emergency Management Specialist Ribbon (Being Phased Out)
- IGR Officer Professional Development Ribbon
- IGR NCO Professional Development Ribbon
- IGR Physical Fitness Ribbon
- IGR 25 Year Service Ribbon (Being Phased Out)
- IGR Long Service Ribbon
- IGR Service Ribbon
- IGR Defense Service Ribbon
- IGR The Indiana Guard Reserve Association Ribbon (No longer issued)
- IGR Superior Unit Citation

The Indiana Guard Reserve also awards the IGR Medallion and expert, sharpshooter, and marksman badges for both rifle and pistol. Members who have previously served in the federal military may wear decorations awarded for prior service may also be worn on the uniform.

== See also ==
- Indiana Naval Militia
- Indiana Wing Civil Air Patrol
- United States Coast Guard Auxiliary
