= Naval militia =

A naval militia or maritime militia is a volunteer organization comprising civilian sailors who train periodically to support naval operations during emergencies or times of war.

== List of naval militias ==
- Naval militias in the United States
- Bolivarian Militia of Venezuela (People's Navy Branch)
- Chinese Maritime Militia
- Vietnamese Maritime Militia
- Naval Brigade of Portugal (branch of the former Portuguese Legion)
