= USS Cheyenne (1898) =

Tugboat of the United States Navy

History

United States
- Name: USS Cheyenne
- Launched: 1885
- Acquired: 8 July 1898
- Commissioned: 30 July 1898
- Decommissioned: 29 August 1898
- Fate: Sold, 14 November 1900

General characteristics
- Type: Tug
- Tonnage: 76 long tons (77 t)
- Length: 96 ft 10 in (29.51 m)
- Beam: 23 ft 3 in (7.09 m)
- Draft: 13 ft 6 in (4.11 m)
- Speed: 11 knots (20 km/h; 13 mph)

USS Cheyenne, a converted tug, was launched in 1885 by Sam Paegnall, Charleston, South Carolina; acquired by the United States Navy on 8 July 1898 as SS Bristol and renamed Cheyenne. Outfitted at Charleston Navy Yard, she was commissioned on 30 July 1898 and reported to the Auxiliary Naval Force.

Cheyenne sailed from the Charleston Navy Yard on 30 July 1898 and proceeded to Key West, for duty off the Florida coast blockade until 18 August, when she cleared for Port Royal, South Carolina, arriving on 21 August. The tug was decommissioned there on 29 August 1898, and sold on 14 November 1900. Renamed "Jacob Kuper" and put in commercial service in 1901. She was sunk on 13 August 1902 when her boiler exploded off Tompkinsville, New York, Staten Island. Three of her crew and one crewman of the barge she was pulling were killed.
