= USS Chickasaw (1882) =

Tugboat of the United States Navy

History

United States
- Name: USS Chickasaw
- Namesake: The Chickasaw, a Native American people
- Builder: John H. Dialogue and Sons, Camden, New Jersey
- Completed: 1882
- Acquired: 25 June 1898
- Commissioned: 1898
- Decommissioned: 26 August 1898
- Recommissioned: April 1900
- Fate: Sold 1913

General characteristics
- Type: Tug
- Displacement: 100 tons
- Length: 77 ft 2 in (23.52 m)
- Beam: 18 ft (5.5 m)
- Draft: 8 ft (2.4 m)
- Speed: 10 knots

The second USS Chickasaw was a United States Navy tug in commission in 1898 and from 1900 to 1913.

Chickasaw was built in 1882 by John H. Dialogue and Sons at Camden, New Jersey, as the commercial tug Hercules. The U.S. Navy purchased Hercules on 25 June 1898 for use in the Spanish–American War and commissioned her as USS Chickasaw. She was in service briefly at Port Royal, South Carolina, and Charleston, South Carolina, before being decommissioned on 26 August 1898, two weeks after the end of the war. She was placed in ordinary for repairs.

In April 1900, Chickasaw was ordered to the New York Navy Yard in Brooklyn, New York, for use as a harbor tug and as a tender for the receiving ship USS Vermont.

In 1908, Chickasaw moved to Newport, Rhode Island, where she served as a harbor tug until 1913, when she returned to New York City and was sold.
