= Varsity Victory Volunteers =

- Active: February 1942-January 1943
- Country: United States
- Allegiance: United States
- Branch: Hawaii Department Army Engineers
- Type: Paramilitary
- Role: Auxiliary Engineers
- Size: 169
- Garrison/HQ: Schofield Barracks
- Nickname: VVV

The Varsity Victory Volunteers (Japanese: 大学勝利奉仕団, Daigaku Shōri Hōshidan) was a civilian sapper unit composed of Japanese-Americans from Hawaii. The VVV was a major stepping stone in the creation of the 442nd Regimental Combat Team, which would end up becoming the most decorated regiment in United States armed forces history.

== History ==
On the day of the attack on Pearl Harbor, the United States announced that all Reserve Officers' Training Corps (ROTC) students were to report for military duty, forming the Hawaii Territorial Guard (HTG). These ROTC students were given a rifle with only five bullets and ordered to guard vital installations such as bridges, wells, reservoirs, pumping stations, water tanks, and high schools. Roughly a month later, it came to the attention of officials in Washington DC that there were Japanese Americans within the HTG. They were ordered back to headquarters where those of Japanese ancestry were dismissed from duty because 4C-"enemy aliens" were ineligible to serve in the military. After their dismissal, the students that were with the HTG returned to campus to talk amongst themselves. They met Hung Wai Ching who suggested the students volunteer in a labor battalion. Soon after a petition was written and signed by the ROTC students then sent to the military governor at the time, Delos C. Emmons, which reads,

We, the undersigned, were members of the Hawaii Territorial Guard until its recent inactivation. We joined the Guard voluntarily with the hope that this was one way to serve our country in her time of need. Needless to say, we were deeply disappointed when we were told that our services in the Guard were no longer needed. Hawaii is our home; the United States, our country. We know but one loyalty and that is to the Stars and Stripes. We wish to do our part as loyal Americans in every way possible and we hereby offer ourselves for whatever service you may see fit to use us.

In February 1942, the 169 students became a labor battalion to be known as the Varsity Victory Volunteers.

== Organization ==
The VVV was assigned to Schofield Barracks and were under the U.S. Army Corps of Engineers, attached to the 34th Combat Engineers Regiment. The VVV was broken down into 12 gangs and each one given a specific task. They did various labor tasks such as: build roads, military installations, fences, string barbed wire, and work in the quarry. They were placed into 3 separate barracks, Varsity, Victory and Volunteers, given a cot, a mattress, food and little to no pay. As time progressed the VVV began to warm up to and gain trust with other units at Schofield that were not of Japanese ancestry. Picnics and parties were held among all races at Schofield including friendly competition. The VVV adopted a football team, boxing team, basketball team, and golf team as well.

== Afterwards ==
In December 1942, the VVV would get a visit from Assistant Secretary of War John J. McCloy who would so happened to be escorted by Hung Wai Ching. Ching made certain McCloy noticed the VVV. In January 1943, the War Department would make an announcement that an all Nisei Regiment was being formed and there was a call for volunteers. The VVV asked to be disbanded to join the newly formed 442nd Regimental Combat Team. Their request was granted and, on January 31, 1943, the VVV had disbanded after 11 months. It was expected a majority of volunteers would come from the mainland instead of the islands, but 10,000 men from Hawaii had volunteered since members of the VVV spread the word about the 442nd.

== Legacy ==
The VVV not only led to the 442nd Regimental Combat Team but it also improved racial stability in the Hawaiian community since many Japanese communities in Hawaii were upset at the way they had been treated. Men such as John Young, Bob Shivers, Kendall J. Fielder, Charles Hemenway, Charles Loomis, Miles Cary, Stephen Mark, Leslie Hicks, and Riley Allen all saw that to not create a racial uproar was of extreme importance.

It was the VVV which marked the turning point in the treatment of the people of Japanese ancestry in this Territory and their acceptance by the rest of the community. What followed afterward-the record of the 100th, the formation of the 442nd and its history of hard-won battles, the less publicized but equally important and impressive record of the interpreter groups, and the work of the civilians on the home front-was the natural result of the trend which was started in the early months of the war when a group of young men, who numbered at no time more than 170, demonstrated to a suspicious and skeptical community that the Americans of Japanese ancestry were every bit as American and every bit as loyal to this country and to her ideals as any other group of Americans, whether they were white, yellow, black, or brown.

== See also ==
- Businessmen's Military Training Corps
- Hawaii Air Depot Volunteer Corp
- Hawaii Defense Volunteers
- Hawaii Territorial Guard
- Women’s Army Volunteer Corp
