= Volunteer Corps =

Volunteer Corps may refer to:

- British Volunteer Corps – a British military reserve force raised in 1794 during the French Revolutionary and Napoleonic Wars and disbanded in 1814
- SAF Volunteer Corps – Established in October 2014 as part of the Singapore Armed Forces to allow women, first generation permanent residents and new immigrants to join.
- Hawaii Air Depot Volunteer Corp – a civilian paramilitary unit at Hickam Air Force Base, Hawaii during the World War II.
- Jesuit Volunteer Corps – an organization of lay volunteers who dedicate one year or more to voluntary community service working with people in need.
- Korean Women's Volunteer Labour Corps – an organization during the Pacific War
- Macedonian-Adrianopolitan Volunteer Corps – a volunteer corps of the Bulgarian Army during the Balkan Wars.
- Puerto Rican Volunteers Corps – a militia composed of private citizens, principally instituted for the defense of Puerto Rico's periphery from pirate incursions and foreign invasion.
- Women's Army Volunteer Corp – an organization within the Women's Army Corps in which women could serve as office assistants or military bus drivers.
- Right Sector Ukrainian Volunteer Corps - former paramilitary wing of the now defunct-Ukrainian nationalist organisation Right Sector
- Volunteer Training Corps - a British military reserve force of the First World War
