= Hung Wai Ching =

Chinese-American businessman (1905–2002)

Hung Wai Ching (August 1, 1905 – February 9, 2002) was a Chinese-American businessman. He founded the Varsity Victory Volunteers, and was one of the founders of Aloha Airlines.

== Early life and education ==
Ching was born in Honolulu on August 1, 1905. His parents were immigrants from China. He attended McKinley High School and graduated in 1924. He graduated from the University of Hawaii in 1928 with a degree in civil engineering, then attended Union Theological Seminary. In 1932, he earned a master's degree from Yale Divinity School. He also worked at the Nuʻuanu YMCA from 1928 to 1938, then as served as secretary at the Atherton YMCA near the University of Hawaii.

== Career ==
During World War II Ching was invited to be part of the Council for Interracial Unity's Morale Division with Shigeo Yoshida and Charles Loomis. This organization was meant to serve as a bridge between the civilian community and the military. They spoke out about the loyalty of Japanese Americans and prevented the wholesale incarceration of Japanese people in Hawaii. In 1943, Ching met with Eleanor and Franklin Roosevelt to report on race conditions in Hawaii and praise the decision not to incarcerate every Japanese person in Hawaii.

When all Japanese soldiers were removed from the Hawaii Territorial Guard in 1942, Ching advocated for a labor battalion to be founded so that these men could still assist the war effort. This organization was called the Varsity Victory Volunteers. Ching continued to support and advocate for these men after the 442nd Regimental Combat Team was founded. When the war ended, Ching helped veterans get jobs and get scholarships to finish their educations. Ching also supported the Hawaii Defense Volunteers, an organization that was similar to the Varsity Victory Volunteers, but with volunteers from the Filipino, Chinese, Korean, and Puerto Rican communities.

After the war, Ching became a real estate broker. He was also one of the founders of Aloha Airlines alongside his brother Hung Wo, and served as a director for 25 years. Ching was a University of Hawaii regent and served as director or trustee of several local businesses and organizations. He died of cancer on February 9, 2002.
