= Kendall J. Fielder =

U.S. Army Brigadier General

Kendall Jordan Fielder
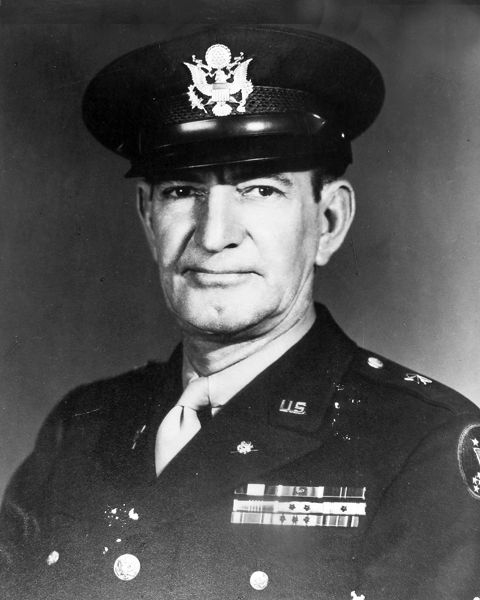
- Brigadier General Kendall J. Fielder
- Born: August 1, 1893; Cedartown, Georgia, US
- Died: April 13, 1981 (aged 87); Honolulu, Hawaii, US
- Burial place: Punchbowl Cemetery
- Military career
- Allegiance: United States of America
- Branch: United States Army
- Service years: 1917–1953
- Rank: Brigadier General
- Nickname: "Wooch"
- Unit: Infantry Branch
- Commands: Military Intelligence & Security, Hawaiian Department
- Conflicts: World War I: Battle of Saint-Mihiel; Battle of Argonne; World War II: Attack on Pearl Harbor
- Awards: Distinguished Service Medal, Legion of Merit, Bronze Star Medal

Brigadier General Kendall "Wooch" Jordan Fielder (August 1, 1893 – April 13, 1981) was an influential World War II officer in the United States Army, who served in Hawaii at the time United States' entry into World War II, and testified before Congress in favor of statehood.

At the time of the attack on Pearl Harbor, then Lieutenant Colonel Fielder was the U.S. Army G-2 Chief of Intelligence and Security. Fielder later helped to form several Japanese Americans formations such as Varsity Victory Volunteers, 100th Infantry Battalion and 442nd Regimental Combat Team.

== Early career and World War I ==
Kendall J. Fielder was born on August 1, 1893, in Cedartown, Georgia, as the son of William and May Fielder. Following a high school, he entered the Georgia Tech, where he played football under coach John Heisman and captained the team between 1915 and 1916. Fielder graduated in summer 1916 with Bachelor of Science degree in textile engineering and accepted job as Real estate loan agent in Atlanta, Georgia.

Following the United States' entry into World War I, Fielder was commissioned second lieutenant in the Infantry branch on May 31, 1917, and ordered for basic training at Fort McPherson. He was subsequently attached to the 56th Infantry Regiment at Camp MacArthur near Waco, Texas. Fielder participated in the intensive training for combat deployment and embarked with his regiment for France in June 1918 as the part of 7th Division.

He rose to the rank of captain and assumed command of Divisional Machine Gun Company. Fielder led this unit during the Battle of Saint-Mihiel in September 1918 and during the fighting in the Argonne Forest in October–November that year. Following the Armistice in November 1918, he was ordered back to the United States.

== Interwar period ==
Fielder remained in the Army and was ordered to Camp Funston, Kansas, and was attached to the 13th Infantry Brigade under Brigadier general Harry H. Bandholtz as Brigade Adjutant. He later moved with the brigade to Camp Meade, Maryland and following the deactivation of the brigade in September 1921, he followed general Bandholtz to the headquarters, Military District of Washington as his assistant adjutant. Fielder remained in this capacity under generals Hamilton S. Hawkins III and Samuel D. Rockenbach until July 1927, when he was ordered to the Philippines.

He was stationed on Luzon and served as Commander of I Company, 57th Infantry Regiment until May 1930. Fielder was subsequently ordered stateside and graduated from the advanced course at the Army Infantry School at Fort Benning, Georgia, in June 1931. He then served as Commanding officer of the Troops at Army War College in Washington, D.C., until mid-1935, when he was promoted to major and appointed battalion commander with 34th Infantry Regiment at Fort Meade, Maryland.

In June 1937, Fielder was sent to the Army Command and General Staff College at Fort Leavenworth, Kansas, and following the graduation one year later, he rejoined his battalion at Fort Meade.

Fielder was ordered to Hawaii in November 1938 and assumed duty as Executive officer, 22nd Infantry Brigade under Brigadier general Clement A. Trott. He served with this command at Schofield Barracks and participated in the training of Japanese Americans soldiers in the 298th Infantry Regiment, the part of Hawaii National Guard. He meanwhile reached the rank of lieutenant colonel.

== World War II ==
In February 1941, Fielder was promoted to Colonel and transferred to Fort Shafter in Honolulu, where he assumed duty as Assistant Chief of Staff, G-2 (Intelligence), Hawaiian Department under lieutenant general Walter C. Short. He also assumed additional duty as Commanding Officer of Military Intelligence & Counterintelligence Hawaii & Pacific Ocean Areas.

Fielder became an active member of the Committee of Inter-Racial Unity, one of many advisory groups to Hawaii FBI Chief Robert Shivers to study and encourage racial harmony among the various ethnic groups on the islands. Following the devastating Japanese Attack on Pearl Harbor, Fielder task was to dispel the rumors and encourage calm among the residents. He investigated allegations of espionage and sabotage, worked with the press to ensure accurate reporting, and gave two radio addresses to calm the fears of the population.

During the events following Pearl Harbor, general Short was relieved of command on December 18, 1941, and replaced by lieutenant general Delos C. Emmons, who had orders from the president Roosevelt which included mass internment of Hawaii's Japanese population on Molokai Island or stateside. Emmons also formed a Public Morale Division in the Territorial Office of Civilian Defense, whose responsibilities included race relation recommendations to Fielder.

Fielder tried to convince Emmons to resist the pressure up the military chain of command to the president. Several members of the Public Morale Division confirmed the arguments between Fielder and Emmons and Hung Wai Ching, who was also member of the Public Morale Division, stated he thought Fielder would be relieved and court martialed during this period. John Burns, head of the Honolulu Police Contact Group, described Fielder as "a man of exemplary courage and an outstanding American" for his actions countering the general.

Unfortunately shortly thereafter, Japanese Americans were released from the Hawaii Territorial Guard, including ROTC students at the University of Hawaii, who signed a petition to form a non-combat labor battalion. This petition was submitted to Fielder, who in turn convinced Emmons to form the Varsity Victory Volunteers, a civilian Japanese Americans sapper unit. Fielder then urged general Emmons that a Nisei combat unit should be formed from the Japanese Americans in the Hawaii Territorial Guard.

Emmons agreed and ordered Fielder to the War Department General Staff in Washington, D.C., to convince Army Chief of Staff, General George C. Marshall to form the unit. Marshall enthusiastically agreed and a provisional infantry battalion of Japanese Americans was formed and sent to the mainland for training on June 6, 1942. This unit was later designated the 100th Infantry Battalion. Fielder also helped to arrange a meeting of Assistant Secretary of War, John J. McCloy with the representatives of Varsity Victory Volunteers and later meeting with first lady Eleanor Roosevelt to discuss Japanese American issues. She promised to inform the president of the issues, which lead to a meeting between the president and representatives of Varsity Victory Volunteers in Washington.

The successes of the Varsity Victory Volunteers, the 100th Battalion, and the meetings with policy makers helped influence the creation of the 442nd Regimental Combat Team (the 100th Battalion became the regiment's first battalion). Fielder and Emmons fully endorsed efforts on the mainland to form the unit. On January 1, 1943, Marshall ordered the formation of the unit. Fielder became known as a "Father of the 442nd".

Fielder continued in the capacity of Assistant Chief of Staff, G-2 (Intelligence), Hawaiian Department under new commanding general, Robert C. Richardson Jr. and toured military installations in the Pacific area during the rest of the war. He was promoted to Brigadier general in early 1944 and received Army Distinguished Service Medal, two awards of Legion of Merit and Bronze Star Medal for his service during World War II.

During the Battle of Okinawa in May–June 1945, General Fielder asked Thomas Taro Higa to go to Okinawa, to help convince the people of Okinawa to come out of the caves and surrender, since Higa was able to make a personal connection with them.

== Later service ==
Following the War, Fielder was reverted to the rank of colonel and ordered to Washington, D.C., where he assumed duty as deputy chief of the Public Information Division for the Army under Major General Floyd L. Parks.

In mid-1948, Fielder returned to Hawaii and joined the headquarters, United States Army Pacific under Lieutenant General John E. Hull. He served consecutively as public information officer; deputy commander for civilian components and chief of staff and following the appointment of new commanding general, John W. O'Daniel in September 1952, Fielder assumed duty as assistant deputy commander of U.S. Army Pacific.

Fielder retired from active duty on July 31, 1953, and was promoted again to the rank of brigadier general according to law, which allowed the Army officers to be retired at the highest rank which they held during their active service. During the parade and review in his honor at Fort Shafter, General O'Daniel presented him with the Certificate of Achievement for Outstanding meritorious service.

== Civil career ==
Upon his retirement from the Army, Fielder settled in Honolulu, Hawaii, and accepted a job on the Honolulu Police Commission. He remained in this capacity until August 1954 and later served as a member of the Board of Director, Crown Corporation, a Hawaii-based diversified growth company engaged in insurance, real estate, property management and development, printing, publishing, garment manufacturing and automotive sales.

Fielder was also a member of Rotary International organization and served as assistant treasurer. Since December 1946, General Fielder was elected as an honorary member of Club 100 (the 100th Infantry Battalion Veterans group). The Japanese-American 100th was the first active battalion of the 442nd Regiment.

According to Edgar Rice Burroughs (writing in Honolulu circa 1944) they played bridge occasionally, and Fielder was an accomplished parlor magician, and a member in good standing of the Society of American Magicians.

Brigadier general Kendall J. Fielder died on April 13, 1981, aged 87, at his home in Honolulu, Hawaii. He is buried at National Memorial Cemetery of the Pacific together with his wife May Crichton Fielder (1897–1994).

== In popular culture ==
Fielder served as a technical adviser for the 1953 film From Here to Eternity. In 1970, Bill Edwards played Colonel Fielder in the film Tora! Tora! Tora!.

== Decorations ==
Here is Brigadier General Fielder's ribbon bar:

1st Row	Army Distinguished Service Medal		
2nd Row	Legion of Merit with Oak Leaf Cluster	Bronze Star Medal	Army Commendation Medal
3rd Row	World War I Victory Medal with two battle clasps	American Defense Service Medal with Base Clasp	Asiatic–Pacific Campaign Medal with three 3/16 inch service stars
4th Row	American Campaign Medal	World War II Victory Medal	National Defense Service Medal
