= Militia (United States) =

U.S. paramilitary force

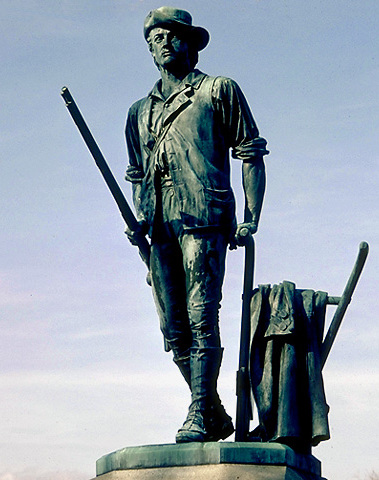
The U.S. ideal of the citizen soldier, in the militia, depicted by The Concord Minute Man of 1775, a monument created by Daniel Chester French and erected in 1875, in Concord, Massachusetts.

The Militia of the several states, as defined by the U.S. Congress, has changed over time. During the colonial era, all able-bodied men of a certain age range were members of the militia, depending on each colony's rule. Individual towns formed local independent militias for their own defense. The year before the U.S. Constitution was ratified, The Federalist Papers detailed the Founding Fathers' paramount vision of the militia in 1787. The new Constitution empowered Congress to "organize, arm, and discipline" this national military force, leaving significant control in the hands of each state government.

Today, as defined by the Militia Act of 1903, the term "militia" is used to describe two classes within the United States:

- Organized militia – consisting of the National Guard and Naval Militia.
- Unorganized militia – comprising the reserve militia: every able-bodied man of at least 17 and under 45 years of age, who are not members of the National Guard or the Naval Militia. These are militia that are under control of the state governors.

Congress chose to organize militias for the interests of organizing reserve military units which were not limited in deployment by the strictures of its power over the constitutional militia, which can be called forth only "to execute the laws of the Union, suppress insurrections and repel invasions."

== Etymology ==
The term "militia" derives from Old English milite meaning soldiers (plural), militisc meaning military and also classical Latin milit-, miles meaning soldier.

The Modern English term militia dates to the year 1590, with the original meaning now obsolete: "the body of soldiers in the service of a sovereign or a state". Subsequently, since approximately 1665, militia has taken the meaning "a military force raised from the civilian population of a country or region, especially to supplement a regular army in an emergency, frequently as distinguished from mercenaries or professional soldiers". The U.S. Supreme Court adopted the following definition for "active militia" from an Illinois Supreme Court case of 1879: " 'a body of citizens trained to military duty, who may be called out in certain cases, but may not be kept on service like standing armies, in times of peace'. . . when not engaged at stated periods . . . they return to their usual avocations . . . and are subject to call when public exigencies demand it."

The spelling millitia is often observed in written and printed materials from the 17th century through the 19th century.

== History ==
=== Historical background ===
Historically, there have been three methods used to raise military forces: a militia, a professional military, or conscription. Conscription, or involuntary service and the enforcement mechanisms required, was incompatible with colonial society. A professional or mercenary army carries with it the tremendous expense required to pay and equip personnel and not used. The militia concept, that of a decentralized military body dependent upon an armed population and residing among the people, was suited to the colonial period.

=== Early Colonial era (1565–1754) ===
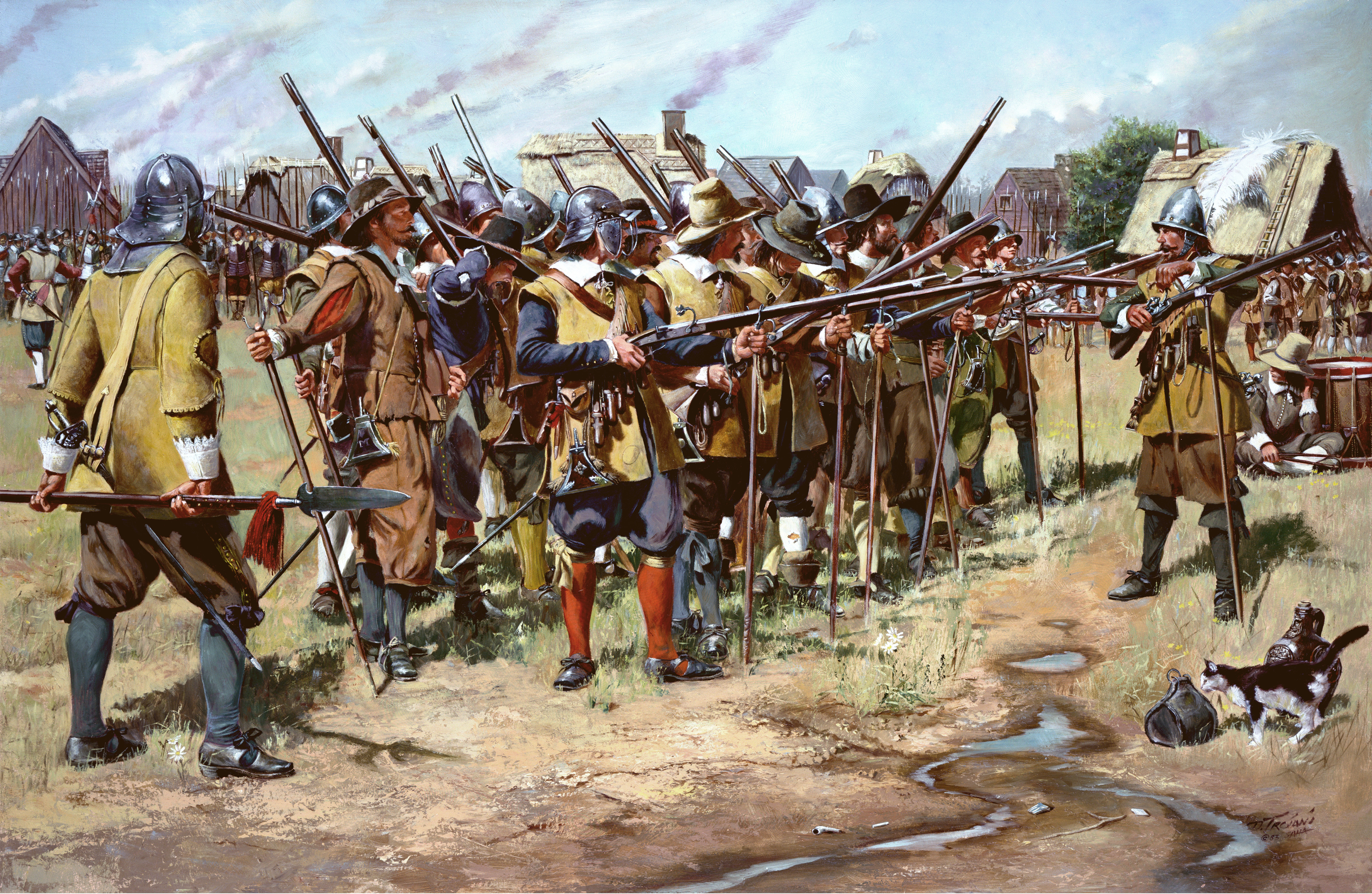
The Massachusetts Militia's first muster in Spring 1637

The early colonists of British America considered the militia an important social institution, necessary to provide defense and public safety.

The first muster took place on September 16, 1565, in St. Augustine, Florida, when Spanish governor Pedro Menendez de Aviles assembled approximately 50 citizen-soldiers, thereby establishing the European militia concept on the North American mainland.

In 1643, the Plymouth Colony Court allowed and established a military discipline to be erected and maintained.

=== French and Indian War (1754–1763) ===
Lieutenant colonel's commission in the New Kent County militia issued to Daniel Parke Custis by Governor Sir William Gooch on August 8, 1740

During the French and Indian Wars, town militia formed a recruiting pool for the Provincial Forces. The legislature of the colony would authorize a certain force level for the season's campaign and set recruitment quotas for each local militia. In theory, militia members could be drafted by lot if there were inadequate forces for the Provincial Regulars; however, the draft was rarely resorted to because provincial regulars were highly paid (more highly paid than their regular British Army counterparts) and rarely engaged in combat.

In September 1755, George Washington, then adjutant-general of the Virginia militia, upon a frustrating and futile attempt to call up the militia to respond to a frontier Indian attack:

... he experienced all the evils of insubordination among the troops, perverseness in the militia, inactivity in the officers, disregard of orders, and reluctance in the civil authorities to render a proper support. And what added to his mortification was, that the laws gave him no power to correct these evils, either by enforcing discipline, or compelling the indolent and refractory to their duty ... The militia system was suited for only to times of peace. It provided for calling out men to repel invasion; but the powers granted for effecting it were so limited, as to be almost inoperative.

For the 1758 campaign again two battalions were raised. The 1st under Col. John Hart would join General Jeffrey Amherst in the capture of Fortress Louisbourg and the 2nd under Lt Col. Goffe was sent to join Gen. James Abercrombie in the defeat at the Battle of Carillon. The regiment and the attached rangers stayed on the flanks during the main assault and covered the retreat of the British Army preventing a complete disaster.

=== Pre-American Revolutionary War era (1763–1775) ===
Just prior to the American Revolutionary War, on October 26, 1774, the Massachusetts Provincial Congress, observing the British military buildup, deemed their militia resources to be insufficient: the troop strength, "including the sick and absent, amounted to about seventeen thousand men ... this was far short of the number wanted, that the council recommended an immediate application to the New England governments to make up the deficiency":

... they recommended to the militia to form themselves into companies of minute-men, who should be equipped and prepared to march at the shortest notice. These minute-men were to consist of one quarter of the whole militia, to be enlisted under the direction of the field-officers, and divide into companies, consisting of at least fifty men each. The privates were to choose their captains and subalterns, and these officers were to form the companies into battalions, and chose the field-officers to command the same. Hence the minute-men became a body distinct from the rest of the militia, and, by being more devoted to military exercises, they acquired skill in the use of arms. More attention than formerly was likewise bestowed on the training and drilling of militia.

=== American Revolutionary War (1775–1783) ===
Minutemen (foreground) at the Battle of Lexington on April 19, 1775

American militiamen from different units in 1774–1775

The American Revolutionary War began near Boston, Massachusetts with the Battles of Lexington and Concord, in which a group of local militias constituted the American side (the "Patriots"). On April 19, 1775, a British force 800 strong marched out of Boston to Concord intending to destroy patriot arms and ammunition. At 5:00 in the morning at Lexington, they met about 70 armed militiamen whom they ordered to disperse, but the militiamen refused. Firing ensued; it is not clear which side opened fire. This became known as "the shot heard round the world". Eight militiamen were killed and ten wounded, whereupon the remainder took flight. The British continued on to Concord and were unable to find most of the arms and ammunition of the patriots. As the British marched back toward Boston, patriot militiamen assembled along the route, taking cover behind stone walls, and sniped at the British. At Meriam's Corner in Concord, the British columns had to close in to cross a narrow bridge, exposing themselves to concentrated, deadly fire. The British retreat became a rout. It was only with the help of an additional detachment of 900 troops that the British force managed to return to Boston. This marked the beginning of the war. It was "three days after the affair of Lexington and Concord that any movement was made towards embodying a regular army".

In 1777, the Second Continental Congress adopted the Articles of Confederation, which contained a provision for raising a confederal militia that consent would be required from nine of the 13 States. Article VI of the Articles of Confederation states,

... every State shall always keep up a well-regulated and disciplined militia, sufficiently armed and accoutered, and shall provide and constantly have ready for use, in public stores, a due number of field pieces and tents, and a proper quantity of arms, ammunition and camp equipage.

Some militia units appeared without adequate arms, as evidenced in this letter from John Adams to his wife, dated August 26, 1777:

The militia are turning out with great alacrity both in Maryland and Pennsylvania. They are distressed for want of arms. Many have none, we shall rake and scrape enough to do Howe's business, by favor of the Heaven.

The initial enthusiasm of Patriot militiamen in the beginning days of the war soon waned. The historian Garry Wills explains,

The fervor of the early days in the reorganized militias wore off in the long grind of an eight-year war. Now the right to elect their own officers was used to demand that the men not serve away from their state. Men evaded service, bought substitutes to go for them as in the old days, and had to be bribed with higher and higher bounties to join the effort – which is why Jefferson and Samuel Adams called them so expensive. As wartime inflation devalued the currency, other pledges had to be offered, including land grants and the promise of "a healthy slave" at the end of the war. Some men would take a bounty and not show up. Or they would show up for a while, desert, and then, when they felt the need for another bounty, sign up again in a different place. ... This practice was common enough to have its own technical term – "bounty jumping".

The burden of waging war passed to a large extent to the standing army, the Continental Army. The stay-at-home militia tended then to perform the role of the internal police to keep order. British forces sought to disrupt American communities by instigating slave rebellions and Indian raids. The militia fended off these threats. Militias also spied on Loyalists in the American communities. In Albany County, New York, the militia established a Committee for Detecting and Defeating Conspiracies to look out for and investigate people with suspicious allegiances.

=== Confederation period (1783–1787) ===
Politically, the militia was highly popular during the postwar period, though to some extent, based more on pride of victory in the recent war than on the realities. This skepticism of the actual value of relying upon the militia for national defense, versus a trained regular army was expressed by Gouverneur Morris:

An overweening vanity leads the fond many, each man against the conviction of his own heart, to believe or affect to believe, that militia can beat veteran troops in the open field and even play of battle. This idle notion, fed by vaunting demagogues, alarmed us for our country, when in the course of that time and chance, which happen to all, she should be at war with a great power.

Robert Spitzer, citing Daniel Boorstin, describes this political dichotomy of the public popularity of the militia versus the military value:

While the reliance upon militias was politically satisfying, it proved to be an administrative and military nightmare. State detachments could not be easily combined into larger fighting units; soldiers could not be relied on to serve for extended periods, and desertions were common; officers were elected, based on popularity rather than experience or training; discipline and uniformity were almost nonexistent.

General George Washington defended the militia in public, but in correspondence with Congress expressed his opinion of the militia quite to the contrary:

To place any dependence on the Militia, is, assuredly, resting upon a broken staff. Men just dragged from the tender Scenes of domestic life; unaccustomed to the din of Arms; totally unacquainted with every kind of military skill, which being followed by a want of confidence in themselves, when opposed to Troops regularly trained, disciplined, and appointed, superior in knowledge and superior in Arms, makes them timid, and ready to fly from their own shadows ... if I was called upon to declare upon Oath, whether the Militia have been most serviceable or hurtful upon the whole, I should subscribe to the latter.

At the end of the Revolutionary War, a political atmosphere developed at the local level where the militia was seen with fondness, despite their spotty record on the battlefield. Typically, when the militia did act well was when the battle came into the locale of the militia, and local inhabitants tended to exaggerate the performance of the local militia versus the performance of the Continental Army. The Continental Army was seen as the protector of the States, though it also was viewed as a dominating force over the local communities. Joseph Reed, president of Pennsylvania viewed this jealousy between the militia forces and the standing army as similar to the prior frictions between the militia and the British Regular Army a generation before during the French and Indian War. Tensions came to a head at the end of the war when the Continental Army officers demanded pensions and set up the Society of the Cincinnati to honor their own wartime deeds. The local communities did not want to pay national taxes to cover the Army pensions, when the local militiamen received none.

=== Constitution and Bill of Rights (1787–1789) ===
The delegates of the Constitutional Convention (the Founding Fathers/Framers of the U.S. Constitution) under Article 1; section 8, clauses 15 and 16 of the federal constitution, granted Congress the power to "provide for organizing, arming, and disciplining the Militia", as well as, and in distinction to, the power to raise an army and a navy. The U.S. Congress is granted the power to use the militia of the U.S. for three specific missions, as described in Article 1, section 8, clause 15: "To provide for the calling of the militia to execute the laws of the Union, suppress insurrections, and repel invasions." The Militia Act of 1792 clarified whom the militia consists of:

Be it enacted by the Senate and House of Representatives of the United States of America, in Congress assembled, That each and every free able-bodied white male citizen of the respective States, resident therein, who is or shall be of age of eighteen years, and under the age of forty-five years (except as is herein after excepted) shall severally and respectively be enrolled in the militia, by the Captain or Commanding Officer of the company, within whose bounds such citizen shall reside, and that within twelve months after the passing of this Act.

==== Civilian control of a peacetime army ====
At the time of the drafting of the Constitution, and the Bill of Rights, a political sentiment existed in the newly formed United States involving suspicion of peacetime armies not under civilian control. This political belief has been identified as stemming from the memory of the abuses of the standing army of Oliver Cromwell and King James II, in Great Britain in the prior century, which led to the Glorious Revolution and resulted in placing the standing army under the control of Parliament. During the Congressional debates, James Madison discussed how a militia could help defend liberty against tyranny and oppression. (Source I Annals of Congress 434, June 8, 1789) However, during his presidency, after enduring the failures of the militia in the War of 1812, Madison came to favor the maintenance of a strong standing army.

==== Shift from states' power to federal power ====
A major concern of the various delegates during the constitutional debates over the U.S. Constitution and the Second Amendment to the Constitution revolved around the issue of transferring militia power held by the states (under the existing Articles of Confederation) to federal control.

Congress shall have the power ... to provide for organizing, arming, and disciplining, the Militia, and for governing such Part of them as may be employed in the Service of the United States, reserving to the States respectively, the Appointment of the Officers, and the Authority of training the Militia according to the discipline prescribed by Congress

— US Constitution, article 1, section 8, clause 16

The President shall be Commander in Chief of the Army and Navy of the United States, and of the Militia of the several States, when called into the actual Service of the United States; he may require the Opinion, in writing, of the principal Officer in each of the executive Departments, upon any Subject relating to the Duties of their respective Offices, and he shall have Power to grant Reprieves and Pardons for Offences against the United States, except in Cases of Impeachment.

— US Constitution, article II, section 2, clause 1

==== Political debate regarding compulsory militia service for pacifists ====
Records of the constitutional debate over the early drafts of the language of the Second Amendment included significant discussion of whether service in the militia should be compulsory for all able bodied men, or should there be an exemption for the "religiously scrupulous" conscientious objector.

The concern about risks of a "religiously scrupulous" exemption clause within the second amendment to the Federal Constitution was expressed by Elbridge Gerry of Massachusetts (from 1 Annals of Congress at 750, 17 August 1789):

Now, I am apprehensive, sir, that this clause would give an opportunity to the people in power to destroy the constitution itself. They can declare who are those religiously scrupulous, and prevent them from bearing arms. What, sir, is the use of a militia? It is to prevent the establishment of a standing army, the bane of liberty. Now it must be evident, that under this provision, together with their other powers, congress could take such measures with respect to a militia, as make a standing army necessary. Whenever Governments mean to invade the rights and liberties of the people, they always attempt to destroy the militia, in order to raise an army upon their ruins.

The "religiously scrupulous" clause was ultimately stricken from the final draft of second amendment to the Federal Constitution though the militia clause was retained. The Supreme Court of the United States has upheld a right to conscientious objection to military service.

==== Concern over select militias ====
William S. Fields and David T. Hardy write:

While in The Federalist No. 46, Madison argued that a standing army of 25,000 to 30,000 men would be offset by "a militia amounting to near a half million of citizens with arms in their hands, officered by men chosen from among themselves ..." [119] The Antifederalists were not persuaded by these arguments, in part because of the degree of control over the militia given to the national government by the proposed constitution. The fears of the more conservative opponents centered upon the possible phasing out of the general militia in favor of a smaller, more readily corrupted, select militia. Proposals for such a select militia already had been advanced by individuals such as Baron Von Steuben, Washington's Inspector General, who proposed supplementing the general militia with a force of 21,000 men given government- issued arms and special training. [120] An article in the Connecticut Journal expressed the fear that the proposed constitution might allow Congress to create such select militias: "[T]his looks too much like Baron Steuben's militia, by which a standing army was meant and intended." [121] In Pennsylvania, John Smiley told the ratifying convention that "Congress may give us a select militia which will in fact be a standing army", and worried that, [p.34] with this force in hand, "the people in general may be disarmed". [122] Similar concerns were raised by Richard Henry Lee in Virginia. In his widely-read pamphlet, Letters from the Federal Farmer to the Republican, Lee warned that liberties might be undermined by the creation of a select militia that "[would] answer to all the purposes of an army", and concluded that "the Constitution ought to secure a genuine and guard against a select militia by providing that the militia shall always be kept well organized, armed, and disciplined, and include, according to the past and general usage of the states, all men capable of bearing arms."

Note: In Federalist Paper 29 Hamilton argued the inability to train the whole Militia made select corps inevitable and, like Madison, paid it no concern.

=== Federalist period (1789–1801) ===
In 1794, a militia numbering approximately 13,000 was raised and personally led by President George Washington to quell the Whiskey Rebellion in Pennsylvania. From this experience, a major weakness of a States-based citizen militia system was found to be the lack of systematic army organization, and a lack of training for engineers and officers. George Washington repeatedly warned of these shortcomings up until his death in 1799. Two days before his death, in a letter to General Alexander Hamilton, George Washington wrote: "The establishment of a Military Academy upon a respectable and extensive basis has ever been considered by me as an object of primary importance to this country; and while I was in the chair of government, I omitted no proper opportunity of recommending it in my public speeches, and otherwise to the attention of the legislature."

=== Early republic (1801–1812) ===
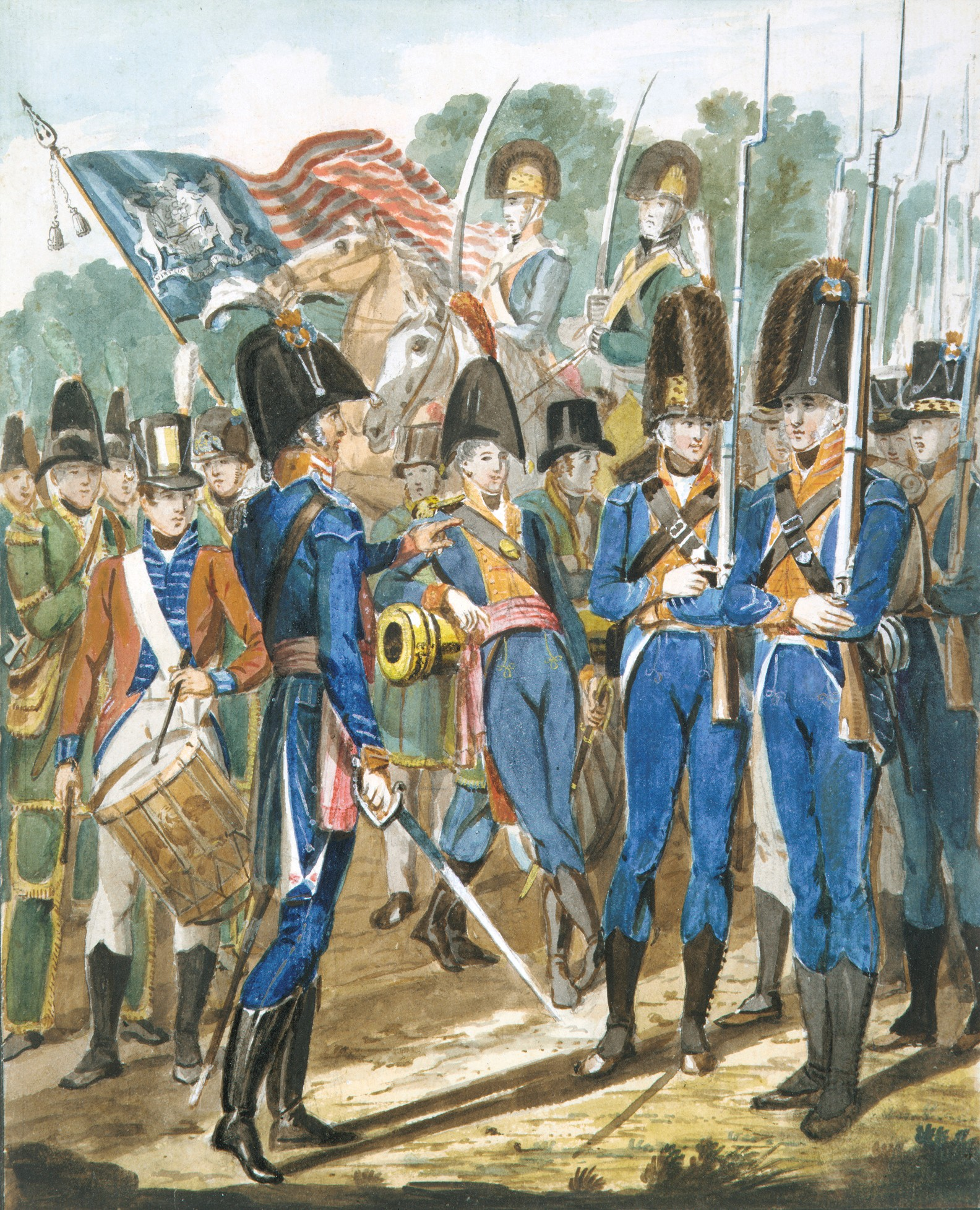
1811–1813 illustration of several Philadelphia militia units

In 1802, the federal military academy at West Point was established, in part to rectify the failings of irregular training inherent in a States-based militia system.

=== War of 1812 (1812–1815) ===
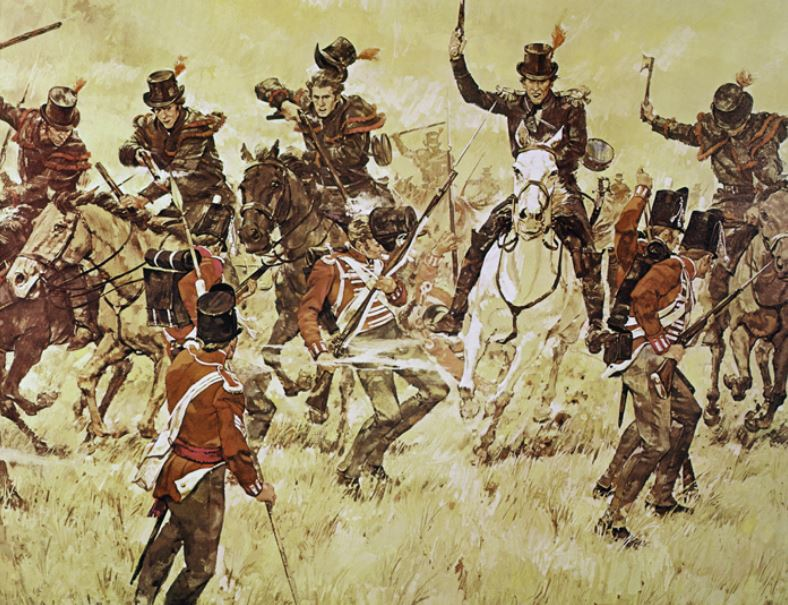
Kentucky militia at the Battle of the Thames in 1813

American militia units saw extensive service during the War of 1812, though with mixed results. Though the US was unprepared for a war with Britain in 1812 (with the United States Army being in a poor state), many Americans believed that the militia alone was sufficient to repel British attacks and conquer the Canadas. Though Democratic-Republican politicians repeatedly praised the militia during the war, most senior American commanders and politicians intended for US forces to consist of regular soldiers augmented by volunteers rather than militiamen, as the latter were considered unreliable and unwilling to serve beyond their terms of service or be sent out of their state. However, only six volunteer regiments were raised during the war. Quarreling among federal and state officials further hampered the effectiveness of the militia, with several state governors opposing the nationalization of their militias as this prevented them from being used to defend the state itself. Despite this, of the 528,000 American troops who served in the war, 458,000 were militiamen.

During the war, American militia units participated in the numerous conflicts fought on the Canada–United States border, including several failed US invasions of Canada. Contemporaries noted the "lack of discipline, poor training, and unreliability under combat conditions" of American militiamen, which was exacerbated by state governments, which often neglected to sufficiently equip and train their own militia units. State militias from the American frontier and New England performed better than those from other states due to a variety of reasons, including the constant threat of warfare with Native Americans. American commanders repeatedly faced difficulties organizing and moving militia, which sometimes resulted in a lack of supplies and the spread of disease among US troops, weakening morale. There were several instances of American militiamen refusing to cross the border into Canada, demonstrating "problems inherent in using militia forces... militiamen were best at defending their home regions rather than conducting offensive operations, or in this case, invading the territory of another sovereign state."

One of the worst performances by American militiamen during the war was the 1814 Battle of Bladensburg. Prior to the battle, 500 US regulars under General William H. Winder were reinforced around 6,500 Southern militiamen. However, when British forces under Major General Robert Ross attacked Winder's army, the American militia units quickly fled, forcing the entire US army to retreat and leading the battle to be nicknamed the "Bladensburg Races". Ross's troops proceeded to capture and burn Washington. However, the militia performed well in other battles, including the battles of the Thames, North Point, Plattsburgh and New Orleans. Ultimately, despite the poor quality of most American militia units they were relied upon by US commanders as the country's regular forces were also in a poor state. Despite their relatively unimpressive performance, the militia "performed well enough to defend America from military conquests and preserve the nation's independence."

=== Antebellum era (1815–1861) ===
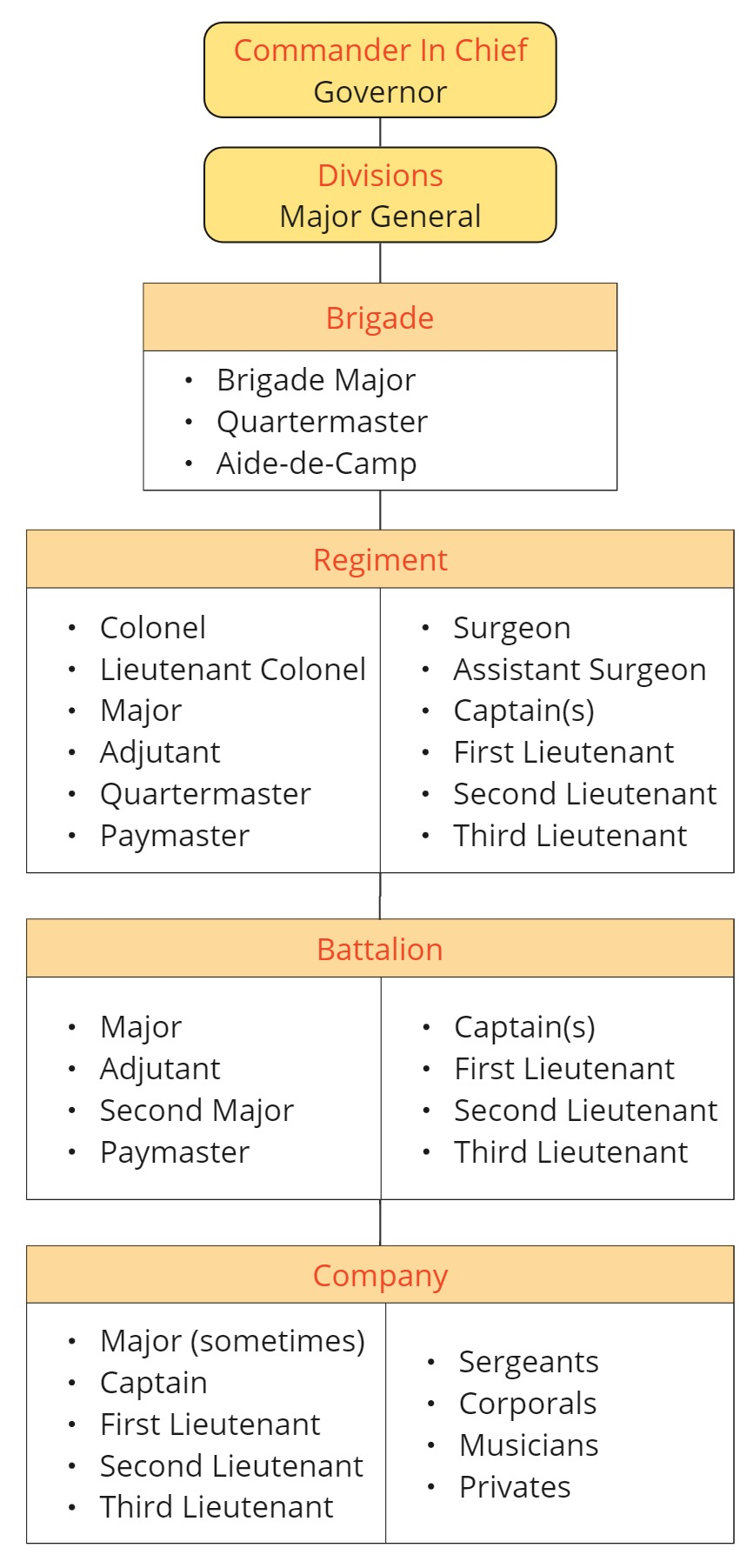
Typical organization of a state militia prior to the Civil War.

By the 1830s, the American frontier expanded westwards, with the Indian Wars in the eastern U.S. ending. Many states let their unorganized militia lapse in favor of volunteer militia units such as city guards who carried on in functions such as assisting local law enforcement, providing troops for ceremonies and parades or as a social club. The groups of company size were usually uniformed and armed through their own contributions. Volunteer units of sufficient size could elect their own officers and apply for a state charter under names that they themselves chose.

1826 North Carolina militia roster of 86 men, standard wage of 46 1/2 cents per day. Text reads: "A List of that Part of the Millitia Commanded by Elisha Burk an went after the Runaway Negroes. ... The within is a True Return of that part of the Millitia Commanded by Elisha Burk While out after the Runaway Negroes: Given under my hand this 15th day of August 1826". (signed) Elisha Burk Captain.

The states' militia continued service, notably, in the slave-holding states, to maintain public order by performing slave patrols to round up fugitive slaves. A Mississippi town history described their militia of the 1840s: "The company musters of the citizen soldiers were held four times a year...After a brief parade, which consisted in a blundering execution of unwarlike antics, these men would start drinking and usually several fights occurred."

Responding to criticisms of failures of the militia, Adjutant General William Sumner wrote an analysis and rebuttal in a letter to John Adams, May 3, 1823:

The disasters of the militia may be ascribed chiefly, to two causes, of which the failure to train the men is a principle one; but, the omission to train the officers is as so much greater, that I think the history of its conduct, where it has been unfortunate, will prove that its defects are attributable, more to their want of knowledge or the best mode of applying the force under their authority to their attainment of their object than to all others. It may almost be stated, as an axiom, that the larger the body of undisciplined men is, the less is its chance of success; ...

During this inter-war period of the nineteenth century, the states' militia tended towards being disorderly and unprepared.

The demoralizing influences even of our own militia drills has long been notorious to a proverb. It has been a source of general corruptions to the community, and formed habits of idleness, dissipation and profligacy ... musterfields have generally been scenes or occasions of gambling, licentiousness, and almost every vice. ... An eye-witness of a New England training, so late as 1845, says, "beastly drunkenness, and other immoralities, were enough to make good men shudder at the very name of a muster".

Joseph Story lamented in 1842 how the militia had fallen into serious decline:

And yet, though this truth would seem so clear, and the importance of a well regulated militia would seem so undeniable, it cannot be disguised, that among the American people there is a growing indifference to any system of militia discipline, and a strong disposition, from a sense of its burdens, to be rid of all regulations. How it is practicable to keep the people duly armed without some organization, it is difficult to see. There is certainly no small danger, that indifference may lead to disgust, and disgust to contempt; and thus gradually undermine all the protection intended by this clause of our National Bill of Rights.

Due to rising tensions between Latter-day Saints and their Missourian neighbors, in 1838, General David R. Atchison, the commander of the state militia of Northwestern Missouri, ordered Samuel Bogart to "prevent, if possible, any invasion of Ray County by persons in arms whatever". Bogart, who had participated in former anti-Mormon vigilante groups, proceeded to disarm resident Latter-day Saints and forced them to leave the county. In response David W. Patten led the Caldwell County militia to rescue Latter-day Saint residents from what they believed was a "mob". The confrontation between these two county militias (Ray and Caldwell) became known as the Battle of Crooked River and is a primary cause for Governor Lilburn Boggs issuing Missouri Executive Order 44. This order, often called the "Extermination Order", told the commander of the Missouri State Militia, General John Bullock Clark, that, "The Mormons must be treated as enemies, and must be exterminated or driven from the state if necessary for the public pease—their outrages are beyond description." In the following days, Missouri militia killed 17 Latter-day Saints at Haun's Mill, laid siege to Far West, Missouri and jailed Latter-day Saint church leaders, including Joseph Smith. The Latter-day Saints would later relocate to Illinois and form their own state-authorized militia, the Nauvoo Legion. After conflicts again rose between the Latter-day Saints and the other residents of Illinois, resulting in the murders of Joseph and Hyrum Smith, Latter-day Saints migrated west to Utah in an attempt to flee the United States. The Utah Territorial Militia, the successor of the Nauvoo Legion, prevented U.S. federal troops from entering the Salt Lake Valley during the Utah War. This war was largely a stand-off between the two forces during 1857 and 1858 as both sides resolved disagreements over governance and calmed Latter-day Saint fears of extermination. The Utah militia mostly engaged in sabotage of U.S. Army supply shipments, and other stratagem to "annoy them in every possible way."

During the violent political confrontations in the Kansas Territory involving anti-slavery Free-Staters and pro-slavery "Border Ruffians" elements, the militia was called out to enforce order on several occasions, notably during the incidents referred to as the Wakarusa War.

During John Brown's raid on Harpers Ferry, local militia companies from villages within a 30-mile radius of Harpers Ferry cut off Brown's escape routes and trapped Brown's men in the armory.

=== American Civil War ===
At the beginning of the American Civil War, neither the North or the South was nearly well enough prepared for war, and few people imagined the demands and hardships the war would bring. Just prior to the war the total peacetime army consisted of a paltry 16,000 men. Both sides issued an immediate call to forces from the militia, followed by the immediate awareness of an acute shortage of weapons, uniforms, and trained officers. State militia regiments were of uneven quality, and none had anything resembling combat training. The typical militia drilling at the time amounted to, at best, parade-ground marching. The militia units, from local communities, had never drilled together as a larger regiment, and thus lacked the extremely important skill, critically necessary for the war style of the time, of maneuvering from a marching line into a fighting line. Yet both sides were equally unready, and rushed to prepare.

==== Confederate militia ====
The units of the Arkansas Militia in the Civil War to which the current Arkansas National Guard has a connection include the Arkansas State Militia, Home Guard, and State Troop regiments raised by the State of Arkansas. Like most of the United States, Arkansas had an organized militia system before the American Civil War. State law required military service of most male inhabitants of a certain age. Following the War with Mexico, the Arkansas militia experienced a decline, but as sectional frictions between the north and south began to build in the late 1850s the militia experienced a revival. By 1860 the state's militia consisted of 62 regiments divided into eight brigades, which comprised an eastern division and a western division. New regiments were added as the militia organization developed. Additionally, many counties and cities raised uniformed volunteer companies, which drilled more often and were better equipped than the un-uniformed militia. These volunteer companies were instrumental in the seizure of federal installations at Little Rock and Fort Smith, beginning in February 1861.

Once Arkansas left the Union in May 1861, the existing volunteer militia companies were among the first mustered into state service and be formed into new volunteer infantry regiments, also referred to as "State Troops". These new regiments comprised the Provisional Army of Arkansas. In July 1861 and agreement was reached to transfer the existing state forces into the Confederate army. The Second Division of the Army of Arkansas was transferred to the Confederate Army under the command of General William E. Hardee, but before the First Division of the Army of Arkansas could be transferred, it participated in the Battle of Wilson's Creek near Springfield, Missouri, in August 1861. Following the battle of Wilson's Creek, the First Division voted to disband rather than enter Confederate Service.

In November 1861, Colonel Solon S. Borland, commanding Confederate forces at Pittman's Ferry received information regarding an imminent invasion of Northeast Arkansas and issued an immediate call for Militia forces to re-enforce his position. The State Military Board authorized the activation of Eighth Brigade of Militia, and one company from the militia regiments of Prairie, Monroe, Poinsett, Saint Francis, and Craighead counties. The units that responded to this call were formed into three regiments of 30 Day Volunteers. Some of these companies later enrolled in regular Confederate service.

In the spring of 1862 a Union invasion of Northwest Arkansas necessitated an activation of parts of the state militia. In February 1862, General McCulloch issued a proclamation from Fayetteville requesting that "every man turn out and form companies, and rally to meet the advancing enemy". Brigadier General N. B. Burrow, commander of the 3rd Brigade, 1st Division, Arkansas State Militia reacted by activating his entire brigade consisting of six regiments for approximately three weeks. Later in the Summer of 1862, when Major General Hindman assumed command of the Department of the Trans-Mississippi, the militia regiments were required to provide volunteers for new Confederate regiments or face conscription.

After the fall of Little Rock to Union forces in September 1863, Governor Harris Flanagin ordered out the militia regiments of Clark, Hempstead, Sevier, Pike, Polk, Montgomery, La Fayette, Ouachita, Union, and Columbia counties and directed them to supply mounted companies for new regiments of State Troops. This recruiting method succeeded in supplying several new mounted companies which participated in resisting Union General Steele's Camden Expedition in the spring of 1864. Sporadic recruiting of new volunteer companies from the Militia continued until March 1865.

The Arkansas Secession Convention directed each county to organize a Home Guard organization, which was intended to include old men and boys who were otherwise disqualified from active service. The Home Guard were later commissioned to begin guerrilla operations against occupying Union forces. Once Union forces secured the state capitol in 1863, the new loyal state government immediately began raising new loyal militia forces in an attempt to combat bands of guerrillas and bushwhackers operating behind Union lines.

The Missouri State Guard (MSG) was a military force established by the Missouri General Assembly on May 11, 1861. While not a formation of the Confederate States Army, the Missouri State Guard fought alongside Confederate troops and, at various times, served under Confederate officers.

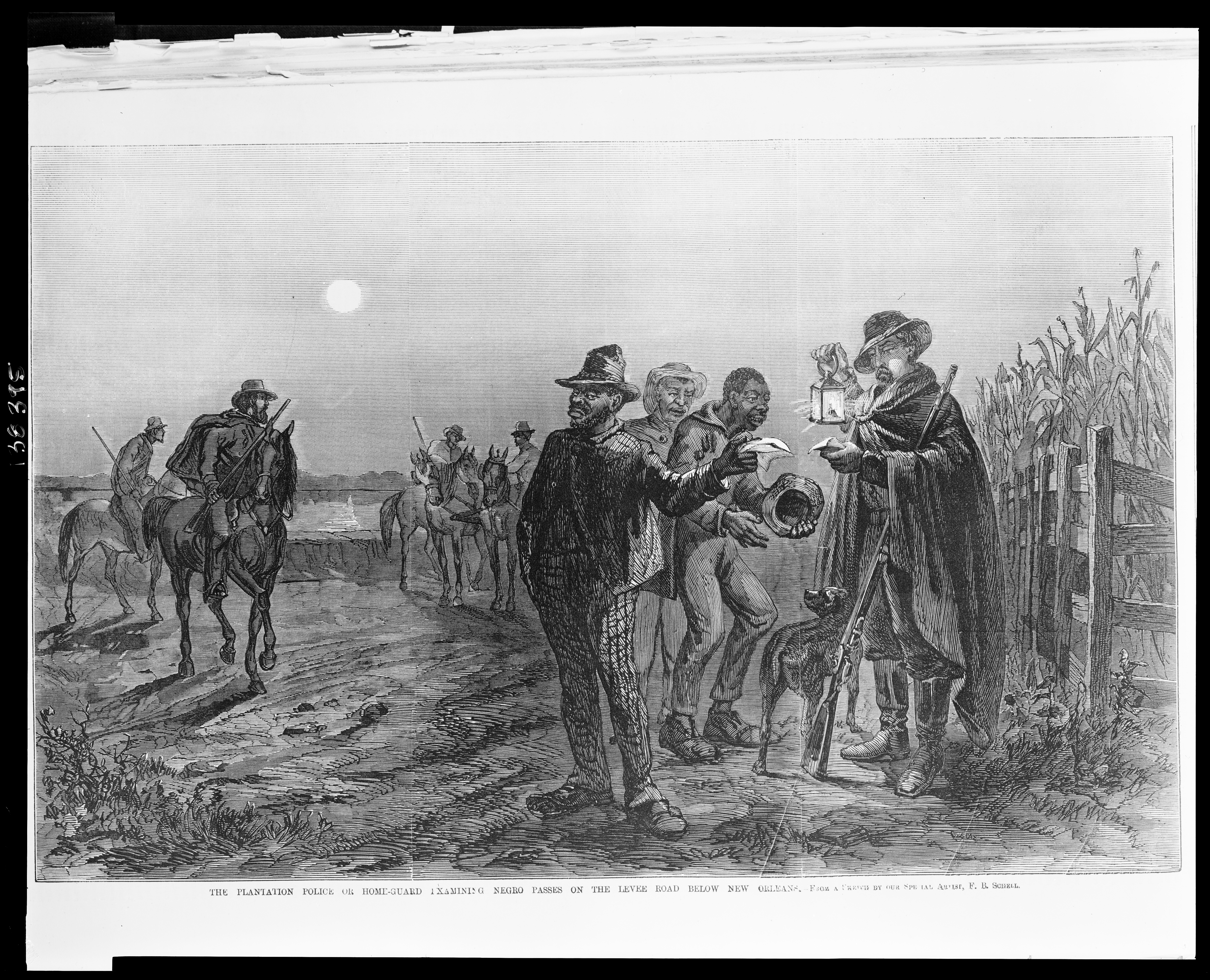
Sketch from Frank Leslie's Illustrated Newspaper, 1863: a Home Guardsman examines "Negro passes" on the levee road below New Orleans.

The Home Guard of the several states of the Confederacy during the American Civil War included all able-bodied white males between the ages of 18 and 50 who were exempt from Confederate service, excepting only the governor and other officials. The Home Guard replaced the militia whose members had volunteered or been conscripted into service in the Confederate Army.

Citizens of some states also formed Unionist Home Guard units. For example, in Kentucky, the Home Guard consisted of Unionist men; Confederate sympathizers in the state, led by Simon Bolivar Buckner, formed militia groups known as the State Guard.

==== Union militia ====
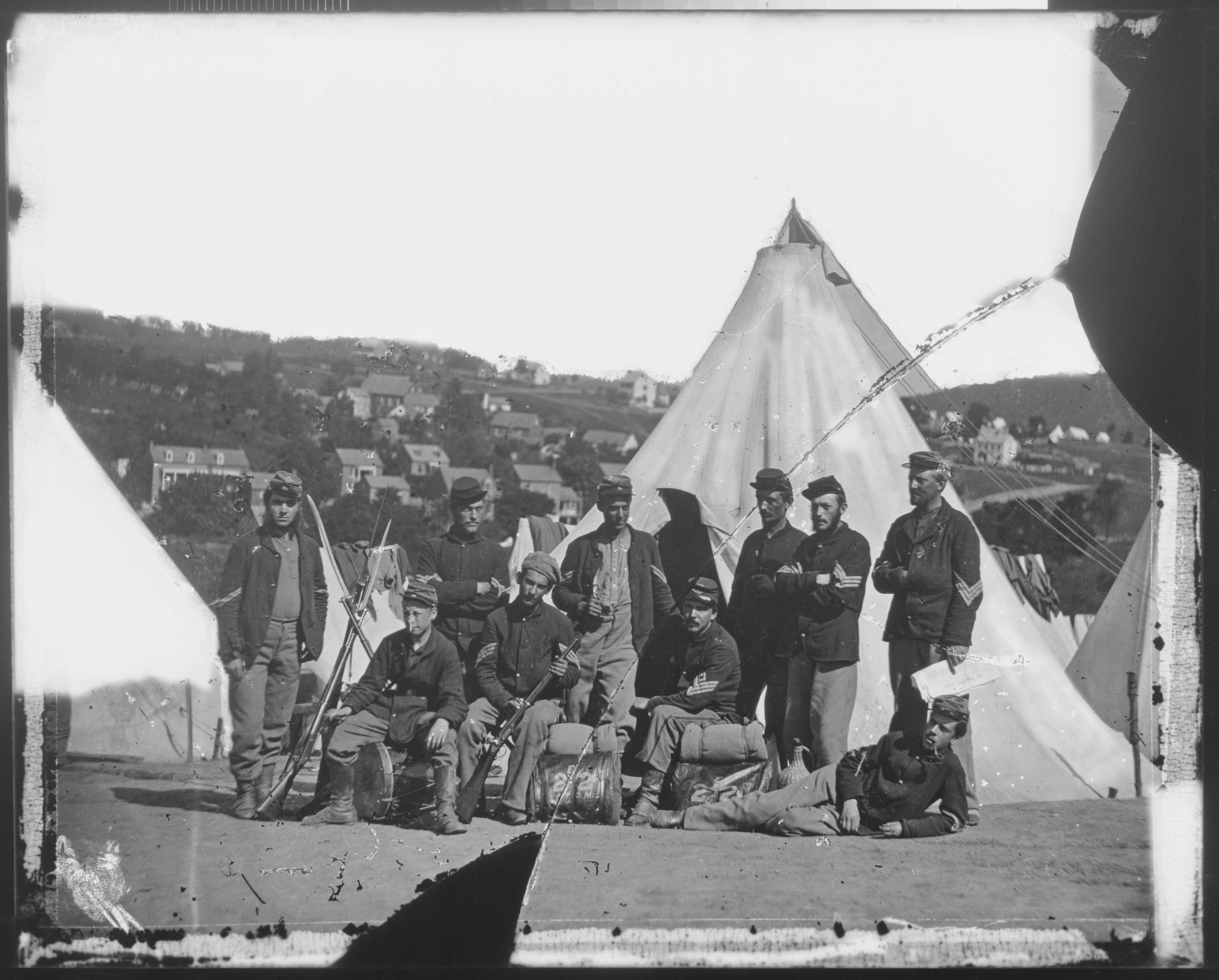
New York state militia, Civil War Company "E", 22nd N.Y. State Militia, near Harpers Ferry.

Following South Carolina's declaration of secession, the Battle of Fort Sumter, and the beginning of the Civil War, President Abraham Lincoln called up 75,000 state militiamen to retake the former U.S. federal fort and found that the militia "strength was far short of what the Congressional statute provided and required".

In the summer of 1861, military camps circled around Washington, D.C. composed of new three-year army volunteers and 90-day militia units. The generals in charge of this gathering had never handled large bodies of men before, and the men were simply inexperienced civilians with arms having little discipline and less understanding of the importance of discipline.

In the West, Union state and territorial militias existed as active forces in defense of settlers there. California especially had many active militia companies at the beginning of the war that rose in number until the end of the war. It provided the most volunteers from west of the Rocky Mountains: eight regiments and two battalions of infantry, two regiments and a battalion of cavalry. It also provided most of the men for the infantry regiment from Washington Territory. Oregon raised an infantry and a cavalry regiment. Colorado Territory militias were organized to resist both the Confederacy and any civil disorder caused by secessionists, Copperheads, Mormons, or most particularly the native tribes.

The Colorado Volunteers participated in the Battle of Glorieta Pass, turning back a Confederate invasion of New Mexico Territory. Later they initiated the Colorado War with the Plains Indians and committed the Sand Creek massacre. The California Volunteers of the California Column were sent east across the southern deserts to drive the Confederates out of southern Arizona, New Mexico, and west Texas around El Paso, then fought the Navajo and Apache until 1866. They also were sent to guard the Overland Trail, keep the Mormons under observation by the establishment of Fort Douglas in Salt Lake City, and fought a campaign against the Shoshone culminating in the Battle of Bear River.

In Nevada, Oregon and Idaho Territory, California, Oregon and Washington Territorial Volunteers tried to protect the settlers and pacified tribes, fighting the Goshute, Paiute, Ute and hostile Snake Indians in the Snake War from 1864 until 1866. In California, volunteer forces fought the Bald Hills War in the northwestern forests until 1864 and also the Owens Valley Indian War in 1862–1863.

The Home Guard were volunteer militia forces of the United States raised by the several States for local defense during wartime.

=== Reconstruction era ===
With passage of federal reconstruction laws between 1866 and 1870 the U.S. Army took control of the former rebel states and ordered elections to be held. These elections were the first in which African Americans could vote. Each state (except Virginia) elected Republican governments, which organized militia units. The majority of militiamen were black. Racial tension and conflict, sometimes intense, existed between the Negro freedmen and the ex-Confederate whites.

In parts of the South, white paramilitary groups and rifle clubs formed to counter this black militia, despite the laws prohibiting drilling, organizing, or parading except for duly authorized militia. In Reconstruction Louisiana, the Knights of the White Camelia, the Ku Klux Klan, Swamp Fox Rangers, and a couple other paramilitary groups sought to counter official governments. These groups engaged in a prolonged series of retaliatory, vengeful, and hostile acts against this black militia.

... the militia companies were composed almost entirely of Negroes and their marching and counter-marching through the country drove the white people to frenzy. Even a cool-headed man like General George advised the Democrats to form military organizations that should be able to maintain a front against the negro militia. Many indications pointed to trouble. A hardware merchant of Vicksburg reported that with the exceptions of the first year of the war his trade had never been so brisk. It was said that 10,000 Spencer rifles had been brought into the State.

The activity of the official black militia, and the unofficial illegal white rifle clubs, typically peaked in the autumn surrounding elections. This was the case in the race riot of Clinton, Mississippi in September 1875, and the following month in Jackson, Mississippi. An eyewitness account:

I found the town in great excitement; un-uniformed militia were parading the streets, both white and colored. I found that the white people—democrats—were very much excited in consequence of the governor organizing the militia force of the state. ... I found that these people were determined to resist his marching the militia (to Clinton) with arms, and they threatened to kill his militiamen.

Outright war between the state militia and the white rifle clubs was avoided only by the complete surrender of one of the belligerents, though tensions escalated in the following months leading to a December riot in Vicksburg, Mississippi resulting in the deaths of two whites and thirty-five black people. Reaction to this riot was mixed, with the local Democrats upset at the influx of federal troops that followed, and the Northern press expressing outrage: "Once more, as always, it is the Negroes that are slaughtered while the whites escape."

=== Great Railroad Strike of 1877 ===
The Great Railroad Strike of 1877, beginning in July 1877 in Martinsburg, West Virginia and spreading to 15 other states across the Midwest, was the first national labor strike in United States history. West Virginia Governor Henry M. Mathews was the first state commander-in-chief to call up militia units to suppress the strike, and this action has been viewed in retrospect as an action that would transform the National Guard by revealing the shortcomings of the state militias. In all, approximately 45,000 militiamen were called out nationwide.

=== Posse Comitatus Act ===
In 1878, Congress passed the Posse Comitatus Act intended to prohibit federal troops and federal-controlled militia from supervising elections. This act substantially limits the powers of the Federal government to use the military serving on active duty under Title 10 for law enforcement, but does not preclude governors from using their National Guard in a law enforcement role as long as the guardsmen are serving under Title 32 or on state active duty.

=== Spanish–American War ===
Despite a lack of initial readiness, training, and supplies, the militias of the United States fought and achieved victory in the Spanish–American War.

=== Ludlow massacre ===
Militia at Ludlow, 1914

In 1914, in Ludlow, Colorado, the militia was called out to calm the situation during a coal mine strike, but the sympathies of the militia leaders allied with company management and resulted in the deaths of roughly 19 to 25 people.

The state National Guard was originally called out, but the company was allowed to organize an additional private militia consisting of Colorado Fuel & Iron Company (CF&I) guards in National Guard uniforms augmented by non-uniformed mine guards.

The Ludlow massacre was an attack by the Colorado National Guard and Colorado Fuel & Iron Company camp guards on a tent colony of 1,200 striking coal miners and their families at Ludlow, Colorado on April 20, 1914.

In retaliation for Ludlow, the miners armed themselves and attacked dozens of mines over the next ten days, destroying property and engaging in several skirmishes with the Colorado National Guard along a 40-mile front from Trinidad to Walsenburg. The entire strike cost between 69 and 199 lives. Thomas Franklin Andrews described it as the "deadliest strike in the history of the United States".

=== Mexican Revolution ===
American organized and unorganized militias fought in the Mexican Revolution. Some campaigned in Mexico as insurgent forces and others fought in battles such as Ambos Nogales and Columbus in defense of the interests of United States.

=== World War I ===
1. The Plattsburg Movement Preparedness Movement. The Hays Law.

== Twentieth century and current ==
=== Organized militia ===
Each state and most territories have two mandatory forces, namely the Army National Guard and the Air National Guard. Many states also have state defense forces and a naval militia, which assist, support and augment National Guard forces.

==== National Guard ====
The National Guard (or National Guard of a State) differs from the National Guard of the United States; however, the two do go hand-in-hand.

The National Guard is a militia force organized by each of the 50 states, the U.S. federal capital district, and three of the five populated U.S. territories. Established under Title 10 and Title 32 of the U.S. Code, the state National Guard serves as part of the first-line defense for the United States. A state or territorial National Guard is divided up into units stationed within their borders and operates under their respective state governor or territorial government. The National Guard may be called up for active duty by the state governors or territorial commanding generals to help respond to domestic emergencies and disasters, such as those caused by hurricanes, floods, and earthquakes.

The National Guard of the United States is a military reserve force composed of state National Guard members or units under federally recognized active or inactive armed force service for the United States. Created by the 1933 amendments to the National Defense Act of 1916, the National Guard of the United States is a joint reserve component of the United States Army and the United States Air Force. The National Guard of the United States maintains two subcomponents: the Army National Guard of the United States for the Army and the Air Force's Air National Guard of the United States.

The current United States Code, Title 10 (Armed forces), section 246 (Militia: Composition and Classes), paragraph (a) states: "The militia of the United States consists of all able-bodied males at least 17 years of age and, except as provided in section 313 of title 32, under 45 years of age who are, or who have made a declaration of intention to become, citizens of the United States and of female citizens of the United States who are members of the National Guard." Section 313 of Title 32 refers to persons with prior military experience. ("Sec. 313. Appointments and enlistments: age limitation (a) To be eligible for original enlistment in the National Guard, a person must be at least 17 years of age and under 45, or under 64 years of age and a former member of the Regular Army, Regular Navy, Regular Air Force, or Regular Marine Corps. To be eligible for reenlistment, a person must be under 64 years of age. (b) To be eligible for appointment as an officer of the National Guard, a person must – (1) be a citizen of the United States; and (2) be at least 18 years of age and under 64.")

These persons remain members of the militia until age 64. Paragraph (b) further states, "The classes of the militia are: (1) the organized militia, which consists of the National Guard and the Naval Militia; and (2) the unorganized militia, which consists of the members of the militia who are not members of the National Guard or the Naval Militia."

The National Guard of the United States is the largest of the organized federal reserve military forces in the United States. The National Guard of the United States is classified (under title 10, United States Code (see above)) as the organized federal reserve military force. Under federal control, the National Guard of the United States can be called up for active duty by the President of the United States. Since the 2003 invasion of Iraq, many National Guard units have served overseas – under the Total Force Policy of 1973 which effectively combined the National Guard with the federal Reserve Components of the armed forces, making them regular troops. This can lead to problems for states that also face internal emergencies while the Guard is deployed overseas. To address such issues, many of the states, such as New York and Maryland also have organized state "militia" forces or state guards which are under the control of the governor of a state; however, many of these "militia" also act as a reserve for the National Guard and are thus a part of it (this varies from state to state depending on individual state statutory laws). New York and Ohio also have active naval militias, and a few other states have on-call or proposed ones. In 1990, the United States Supreme Court ruled in the case of Perpich v. Department of Defense that the federal government has plenary power over the National Guard, greatly reducing (to the point of nonexistence) the state government's ability to withhold consent to federal deployments and training missions of the National Guard.

==== State defense forces ====
Since the Militia Act of 1903, many states have created and maintained a reserve military force known as state defense forces; some states refer to them as state military reserves or state guards. They were created to assist, support, and augment National Guard forces during peacetime conditions. During the call-up of National Guard forces for wartime deployments, state defense forces can be used to assume the full military responsibilities of the state. Their mission includes the defense of the state and the enforcement of military orders when ordered by their Governor.

Throughout the 20th century, state defense forces were used in every major war. New York Guard soldiers patrolled and secured the water aqueduct of New York and mass transit areas, and were even deployed to France to assist in logistical operations in World War I. The Texas State Guard's soldiers suppressed a riot and maintained peace and order in Texas throughout World War II.

Today state defense forces continue to assist, support, and augment the National Guard of the state. They provide logistical, administrative, medical, transportation, security, and ceremonial assistance. Some states have provided additional support, such as the New York State Defense Force (New York Guard) providing its soldiers to support and augment the National Guard CERFP Team. The California State Military Reserve provides the National Guard with soldiers to assist with military police training, and the Alaska State Defense Force constantly provides armed military police troops to assist with the security of that state. One of the major roles of the Mississippi State Guard is providing operational support during natural disasters such as hurricane relief operations.

=== Unorganized militia ===
All able-bodied men 17 to 45 of age who are not part of the organized militia are known as the unorganized militia (10 USC). Able-bodied men who are not eligible for inclusion in the reserve militia pool are those aliens not having declared their intent to become citizens of the United States (10 USC 246).

All female citizens who are members of National Guard units are also included in the reserve militia pool (10 U.S.C. § 246).

Other persons who are exempt from call to duty (10 U.S.C. § 247) and are therefore not required to be in the reserve militia pool include:

- Former regular component veterans of the armed forces who have reached the age of 64 (32 USC 313). See Standby Reserve, and Individual Ready Reserve regarding status of veterans younger than 64 years.
- The Vice President (also constitutionally the President of the Senate, that body which confirms the appointment of senior armed forces officers made by the Commander in Chief).
- The judicial and executive officers of the United States, the several States and Territories, and Puerto Rico.
- Members of the armed forces, except members who are not on active duty.
- Customhouse clerks.
- Persons employed by the United States in the transmission of mail.
- Workmen employed in armories, arsenals, and naval shipyards of the United States.
- Pilots on navigable waters.
- Mariners in the sea service of a citizen of, or a merchant in, the United States.

At the time of formation of the Republic, each state was the authority commanding unorganized militias of their residents, as contrasted with organized military units subject to inclusion to the Continental Army.

Many individual states have additional statutes describing their residents as part of the state militia. For example, the state of Washington's law specifies all able-bodied citizens or intended citizens over the age of eighteen as members of the state militia, as explicitly distinct from the National Guard and Washington State Guard. In states such as Texas, the state constitution classifies male citizens between the ages of 17 and 45 as belonging to the "Unorganized Reserve Militia". The Texas constitution also grants county sheriffs and the state governor the authority to call upon the unorganized reserve militia to uphold the peace, repel invasion, and suppress rebellion, similar to the early "Texas Rangers".

=== Private militias and the modern citizen-militia movement ===
Laws authorizing the state governments to officially make privately organized militias part of the state's official military force vary; Nevada, for example, allows the governor to "issue licenses to bodies of persons to organize, drill and bear arms as volunteer military companies or volunteer military organizations," whereas South Carolina prohibits any group from being enlisted into its state guard. States with military histories that date back to the American Revolution may officially recognize militias from that era that continue to exist and operate independently; Massachusetts law explicitly makes the National Lancers part of its organized militia and protects the right of the Ancient and Honorable Artillery Company of Massachusetts to exist and operate as a private organization, while Rhode Island recognizes a number of independent chartered militias as a separate part of its overall military force. During World War II, Hawaii authorized several private paramilitary militias to operate, including the Businessmen's Military Training Corps and the Hawaii Air Depot Volunteer Corps.

Since approximately 1992, there have been a number of state- and regional-level private organizations in the United States that call themselves militia or unorganized militia, some of which have been tied to domestic terrorism and extremist views, which operate without any official sanctioning or licensing by their state governments. Barbara MacQuade argues these paramilitary groups calling themselves militia are unconstitutional as is the "insurrection theory" that many of these paramilitaries claim justifies their existence. The 2000s and 2010s also saw the formation of several national-level private militia organizations, the largest of which were the Oath Keepers and Three Percenters.

== List of legislated militia in the United States ==
=== U.S. federal militia forces ===
- National Guard of the United States

=== U.S. states' militia forces ===
- State defense forces
  - Naval militia

== See also ==
- Colonial American military history
- Irregular military
- List of United States militia units in the American Revolutionary War
- Nauvoo Legion
- State Guard Association of the United States

== Sources ==
Historic documents

- Anti-Federalist Papers
- Federalist Papers
- Militia Act of 1792
- Militia Act of 1903
- National Defense Act of 1916
- National Guard Mobilization Act of 1933
- Total Force Policy of 1973
