= Okinawan wrestling =

Okinawan sumo, also known as Tegumi, is a traditional Ryukyuan wrestling. Unlike Japanese sumo, it allows grappling, joint locks and submission. It is the native ground-fighting art of Okinawa. and an important root of karate. It survives now as a local folk sport.
