= Thomas Taro Higa =

United States Army soldier

Thomas Taro Higa (September 22, 1916 – February 11, 1985) was a wartime hero both in the United States and Okinawa. He earned a Purple Heart and Silver Star. In 2015, NHK produced the docudrama Nikkeijin Who Saved Okinawa (沖縄を救った日系人, okinawa wo sukutta nikkeijin) in Higa's memory.

== Early life ==
Thomas Taro Higa was born on September 22, 1916, in Honolulu, Hawaii, to immigrant parents Kana and Kamezo Higa. He was the third child of twelve children. During the early 1900s, many Ryukyuan would immigrate to Hawaii in hopes of creating a lifestyle as "immigrant laborers." Their goal was to work hard and return to home with honor. Higa's parents did not have time to rear their children, so they sent the children that were born in Hawaii back to Okinawa entrusted by close relatives. Higa was sent with his older brother and older sister to their ancestral home in Shimabukuro, Kitanakagusuku, Nakagami-gun, Okinawa-Ken and was raised by his grandparents until he was 9 years old.

== Career ==
After childhood, Thomas Higa went with his cousin and his cousin's wife and children to Osaka to fulfill his cousin's dream of living in a new land. Higa's first job was at a store called the Daimaru Shoten in Nomura-cho, which was owned by someone from Wakayama Prefecture. Higa then left to work as a "live-in" apprentice at a wholesale cosmetics store called Horikoshi Kotetsu Sha which was owned by an Imperial University graduate from Toyama Prefecture. He was also employed at Fuji Denro Kogyo Ltd. under Yasutaro Goto, which manufactured iron hardening kilns for military use. Back in Hawaii, Higa's father had a large farm and needed more help. Higa returned to Hawaii when he was old enough to help.

=== Invention ===
Thomas Higa first became interested in electricity when he first read about it at the Horikoshi Kotetsu Sha. When he came back to Hawaii, he wanted to replace the kerosene lamps with an electric generator. He created this generator by utilizing the water from the stream by his house to power it. He used waste materials and an abandoned car to create a generator for his house. Word spread and Professor Tadaoki Yamamoto, the Department Chairman of the Faculty of Science & Engineering at the Waseda University, came to meet Higa and asked him to come to Japan and study. Since then, he completed 15 other inventions and applied for several patents at the Patent Bureau in Tokyo. He often had to go to the American Embassy to prove his American citizenship.

== World War II ==
During World War II he served in the 100th Infantry Battalion for the United States Army, where he received a Purple Heart after being shot while serving in Italy. From June 1944 to January 1945 he was sponsored by the United States Army Relocation Authorities and Japanese American Citizens League to go on a seven-month lecture tour to 75 relocation camps throughout the United States. The purpose of the speaking tour was to raise awareness and gain support for Japanese American troops.

Since Higa was able to speak English, Japanese and Okinawan, he was a valuable asset to the United States military. General Kendall J. Fielder asked Higa to go to Okinawa during World War II to help convince the people of Okinawa to come out of the caves and surrender because Higa would be able to make a personal connection with them. Higa risked his own life entering these caves unarmed and saved several villages. After the war, Higa helped with efforts to rebuild Okinawa, sending pigs donated from Hawaii to replenish their depleted stock. In May 1983, Higa was honored by the Okinawan government for his contributions to the Okinawan people during and after the war in the Pacific.

=== Marriage ===
Higa married Toshiko Chinen on November 22, 1945, in Kauai where his wife was born. Higa was first introduced to Chinen after she wrote a letter of encouragement to him. She frequently wrote him letters and he had hoped to meet her in person. She would write about her family and friends in Okinawa and soon they wrote about their health and more personal stories. They developed a relationship and decided to wed as soon as Higa would return home from the war. This was a large gamble because they had never even seen each other before. Higa was doubting the marriage until he received a letter from his previous teacher who wrote, "An evil may sometimes turn out to be a blessing in disguise. Do not feel downhearted. One's mental power controls his bodily condition. Let your mental strength heal your wounds. I have no doubt that you can do this." This letter was dated on December 18, 1943, and two years later he married Toshiko Chinen.

Thomas Taro Higa died on February 11, 1985, in Honolulu, Hawaii.

== Post-World War II effort ==
=== Contributions ===
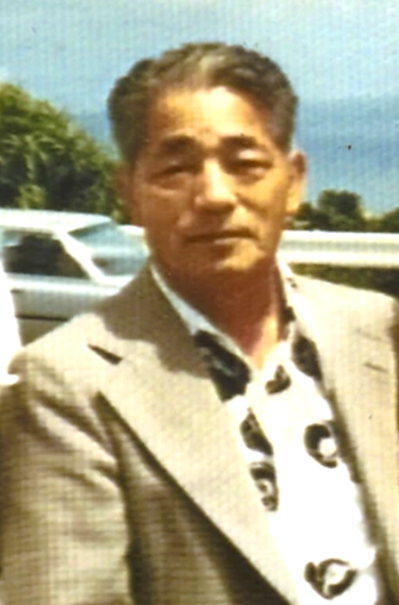
- Higa in Okinawa in 1983.
  1968—Produced a documentary film, "Hawaii ni Ikiru" ("Life in Hawaii", created to commemorate the 65th anniversary of the Okinawan immigration to Hawaii.
- 1974—Published Imin Wa Ikiru (Immigrants Live On), this book was an account of several Okinawan immigrants to Hawaii and North and South America.
- 1982—Published Aru Nisei No Wadachi (Memoirs of a Certain Nisei)

=== Awards ===
- May 1983—Higa was honored by the Okinawan government and the Ryukyu University for his many contributions to the Okinawan people during and after the war.
- July 1983—Recipient of the Okinawa Times Award,
- August 1984—Recipient of the certificate of appreciation from Japanese American Citizens League at national convention in Honolulu, Hawaii.

Thomas Higa was also the recipient of the Silver Star for his great and brave service to the United States Army during World War II. The honor was awarded for his action during heavy fire in Italy on November 5, 1943. Higa was wounded from the back but continued to aid his fellow soldiers by carrying two men to a sheltered area. He then went back into the war zone to offer more aid. The heroic acts of Thomas Higa exemplifies the significance behind the honor of the Silver Star.
