= Lewchewan =

Lewchewan may refer to:

- Ryukyuan languages (Lewchewan languages)
- Ryukyuan people (Lewchewan people)

== See also ==
- Ryukyuan (disambiguation)
