= Tegumi =

Traditional form of wrestling from Okinawa

- Also known as: Grappling Hand, Okinawan Sumo, Okinawan wrestling
- Focus: Grappling
- Country of origin: Ryūkyū Kingdom
- Creator: Various
- Olympic sport: No

Tegumi (手組) or Mutō (無刀) is a traditional form of wrestling from Okinawa.

According to Shōshin Nagamine, in his "Tales of Okinawa's Great Masters", there are no accurate historical documents surrounding the origins of grappling in Okinawa. It seems that tegumi evolved from an indigenous form of grappling self-defense, which was constantly being adapted and enhanced as it was exposed to outside influences.

It is believed by some, Nagamine included, that tegumi was probably the original form of fighting in Okinawa and, after incorporating striking and kicking techniques imported from China, became the progenitor of Te, which is the foundation of modern karate.

According to Gichin Funakoshi's autobiography, early students of karate benefitted from experience in tegumi growing up, which gave them the fundamentals of fighting. He speculated that it was part of growing up in the Ryukyu kingdom, essentially what academics later in the 20th century would call the childlore of Okinawa, though he never used the term himself.

Known as tegumi in Naha, and mutō in Tomari and Shuri, Okinawan wrestling remained a popular cultural recreation until the Taishō period (1912 – 1925). There is little evidence of how tegumi evolved but the result was a rough and tumble bout where the winner was decided by submission, through joint locks, strangles or pinning. Today, tegumi has a strict set of rules and is still practiced widely.

Okinawan folklore is full of references to tegumi and it is believed that the island's version of sumo can find its roots in the rural wrestling of the past.
