= Hawaii Naval Militia =

Inactive naval militia of Hawaii

The Hawaii Naval Militia (Hawaiian: Hawaii Milana Militia) is the inactive naval militia of Hawaii. As a naval militia, it was organized as a naval parallel to the Hawaii National Guard. Along with the National Guard, the Hawaii Naval Militia is recognized as part of the organized militia of Hawaii.

== History ==
Steps were first taken to organize the Hawaii Naval Militia in 1899 when the former Hawaii secretary of ligation, J. B. Castle, wrote a letter to the Secretary of the Navy, John Davis Long, asking about the naval regulations that would need to be followed in order to establish the naval militia.

By 1910, the Hawaii Naval Militia was organized into two divisions.

In 1915, the Act to provide a Naval Militia for the Territory of Hawaii was officially approved by its Governor.

By 1916, the Hawaii Naval Militia had added marine and aeronautical sections. On Memorial Day, May 30, 1916, the Hawaii Naval Militia made its first public appearance. In the summer of 1916, the Hawaii Naval Militia drilled aboard the USS St. Louis. Around this time, it numbered 100 enlisted and eight officers.

== Personnel ==
Naval militias are partially regulated and equipped by the federal government, and therefore membership requirements are partially set according to federal standards. Under 10 U.S. Code § 7854, in order to be eligible for access to "vessels, material, armament, equipment, and other facilities of the Navy and the Marine Corps available to the Navy Reserve and the Marine Corps Reserve", at least 95% of members of the naval militia must also be members of the United States Navy Reserve or the United States Marine Corps Reserve.

== Legal status ==
Naval militias of U.S. states are recognized by the federal government of the United States under 10 U.S. Code §7851. Hawaii law also recognizes the Hawaii Naval Militia as a component of the organized militia of Hawaii. Therefore, an act of legislature by the Hawaii State Legislature or an executive order from the Governor of Hawaii could return the Hawaii Naval Militia to active service.

== See also ==
- Hawaii Territorial Guard
