= Okinawan =

Okinawan may refer to:

- Something or someone related to:
  - Okinawa Island
  - Okinawa Islands
  - Okinawa Prefecture
- Okinawan language, an endangered language spoken by the people of Okinawa Island

== See also ==
- Okinawa (disambiguation)
- Ryukyuan (disambiguation)
