= Hawaii Territorial Guard =

- Active: 1941–1947
- Country: United States
- Allegiance: Hawaii
- Branch: Army
- Type: State defense force
- Role: Military reserve force
- Equipment: Springfield 1903 rifle

Commanders
- Civilian Leadership: Governor Joseph Poindexter

The Hawaii Territorial Guard (Hawaiian: O na La kiai) was the state defense force of Hawaii during World War II. As a result of the National Guard of Hawaii being federalized for the duration of the war, the Hawaii Territorial Guard was created to serve as the stateside replacement for the National Guard. During the war, it was the sole military force available to the Governor of Hawaii as its captain general to use in defense of the state. Unlike the National Guard, as a state defense force, the Hawaii Territorial Guard was not subject to federalization or deployment outside of the borders of Hawaii, but rather answered only to the governor.

== History of predecessor units ==
The National Guard and the state defense forces both trace their roots to the state militias which made up the majority of the United States Armed Forces prior to the implementation of the Militia Act of 1903 and the subsequent creation of the modern National Guard of the United States as a federal reserve force. The first militia in Hawaii was the Honolulu Rifles, composed of non-native Hawaiians, which was created in 1884. After state militias were reorganized into the National Guard, the remaining Hawaiian militia units were reorganized into the National Guard.

== Creation ==
The Hawaii Territorial Guard was created by Governor Joseph B. Poindexter, who ordered the mobilization of a Territorial Guard around 10:00 a.m. on December 7, 1941, during the attack on Pearl Harbor.

== Membership ==
Immediately after ordering the activation of the Territorial Guard, Governor Poindexter began the task of creating it. The University of Hawaii Reserve Officer's Training Corps was activated and assembled at the University of Hawaii campus and immediately drafted into the Territorial Guard, alongside various high school JROTC students.

At 11:00 a.m. on the same day, all members of the American Legion were also called to duty via radio, thus adding between three hundred and four hundred members to the Territorial Guard ranks, whose membership would reach a strength of 89 officers and 1,254 enlisted men by December 31, 1941.

In January 1942, due to suspicions of their loyalty, all ethnic Japanese members were dismissed from the Hawaii Territorial Guard. Hawaii Territorial Guardsmen who had been discharged petitioned General Delos Carleton Emmons, the Military Governor of Hawaii, to be allowed contribute to the war effort in another way, and in February they were assigned to a regiment of engineers as a 160-man auxiliary unit called the Varsity Victory Volunteers. After the temporary shutdown of the unit, the Hawaii Territorial Guard was immediately reactivated without its ethnic Japanese members and began recruiting replacements.

== Duties ==
The Hawaii Territorial Guard was tasked with guarding against a potential paratrooper assault by the Japanese in the immediate aftermath of the Pearl Harbor attack. After the immediate threat had passed, they were assigned to guard key buildings and infrastructure against sabotage.

== Equipment ==
Members of the Hawaii Territorial Guard were issued M1903 Springfield rifles.

== Disbandment ==
The Hawaii Territorial Guard was disbanded in 1947.

== Other militias ==
There were several other militias composed of civilians, but these were given limited recognition and training by the United States government. These included the following private militia units:

- Businessmen's Military Training Corps
- Hawaii Defense Volunteers
- Hawaii Air Depot Volunteer Corp
- Kauai Volunteers
- Maui Volunteers
- Molokai-Lanai Volunteers
- Organized Defense Volunteers
- Varsity Victory Volunteers
- Women's Army Volunteer Corp

== Legal status ==
State defense forces are permitted by the federal government under Title 32, Section 109 of the United States Code. Currently, 23 states and the territory of Puerto Rico maintain active state defense forces. Hawaii state law also recognizes the Hawaii state defense force as a component of the militia of the state. Therefore, the existing legal framework makes it possible for the Governor of Hawaii or the state legislative to order the reactivation of a Hawaii state defense force in the future, inheriting the lineage and traditions of not just the old HTG but of the volunteer Hawaiian-American militia organizations of the Second World War.

== See also ==
- Hawaii Naval Militia
- Hawaii Wing Civil Air Patrol
