= Okinawa =

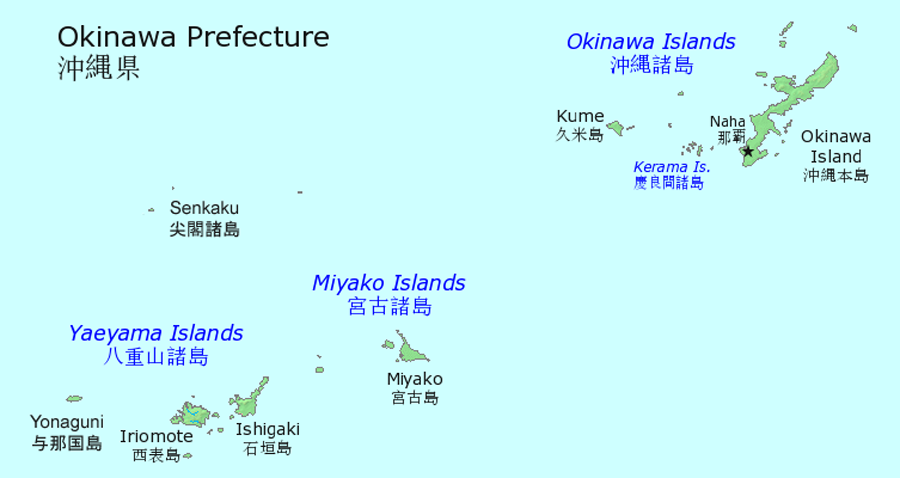
Okinawa Prefecture, including the Okinawa Islands, of which Okinawa Island is the main island

Okinawa (Japanese: 沖縄, Hepburn: Okinawa; Okinawan: 沖縄 / うちなー, romanized: Uchinā) most commonly refers to:

- Okinawa Prefecture, Japan's southernmost prefecture
- Okinawa Island, the largest island of Okinawa Prefecture
- Okinawa Islands, an island group within Okinawa Prefecture that includes Okinawa Island
- Okinawa (city), the second largest city in the prefecture

It may also refer to:

- Battle of Okinawa, a major battle in the Pacific Theater of World War II, fought between the US and Japan
- Naval Base Okinawa, US facilities on Okinawa Island, Japan
- Okinawa Autotech, an Indian electric scooter manufacturer
- Okinawa Trough, a geologic basin in the West Pacific
- Okinawa Uno, a city and municipality in Bolivia
- Okinawa (film), a 1952 American war film by Leigh Jason

== See also ==
- Okinawan (disambiguation)
- Ryukyu (disambiguation)
- Names of Okinawa
- USS Okinawa
