= Hawaii Air Depot Volunteer Corps =

- Active: October 1942 – 4 July 1945
- Country: United States
- Type: Paramilitary
- Role: Anti-aircraft; Firefighter; Security; EMS; Mechanics
- Size: 1,500
- Garrison/HQ: Hickam Air Force Base

Commanders
- Commanding Officer: Lt. Col Cecil J. Murphy

The Hawaii Air Depot Volunteer Corps (HADVC) was a civilian Paramilitary unit at Hickam Air Force Base, Hawaii during World War II. The HADVC took on a wide variety of roles helping in the routine operations of the airfield. Along with the Businessmen's Military Training Corps (BMTC), Hawaii Defense Volunteers, Women's Army Volunteer Corps (WAVC), 1st Oahu Volunteer Infantry, and 2nd Oahu Volunteer Infantry, they formed the Organized Defense Volunteer Regiments. Even as a civilian militia, they had anti-aircraft guns in their arsenal.

== History ==
The commanding officer of the HADVC was Lieutenant Colonel Cecil J Murphy. The unit was formed in October 1942 with a total of 1,500 personnel.

== Tasks ==
Tasks and duties that the HADVC conducted included:

- Anti-aircraft operations
- firefighting
- Conducting base security
- Chemical decontamination
- Providing EMS
- Working as aircraft mechanics
- Anti-sabotage work
- Evacuation duties of non-combatants.

== See also ==
- Hawaii Territorial Guard
