= Ryukyu (disambiguation) =

The Ryukyu Islands are a volcanic arc archipelago.

Ryukyu may also refer to:

- Ryukyuan languages
- Ryukyuans
- Ryukyu Kingdom (1429–1879)
- Ryukyu Broadcasting Corporation, a radio and television broadcaster in Okinawa Prefecture, Japan
- Ryukyu Asahi Broadcasting, a television station in Okinawa Prefecture, Japan
- University of the Ryukyus, a university in Okinawa Prefecture, Japan
- Ryuko (My Hero Academia), a fictional character
- Ryukyu (video game), a 1989 puzzle video game developed by ASCII Corporation

== See also ==
- Okinawa (disambiguation)
- Okinawan (disambiguation)
- Liuqiu
- Lewchewan (disambiguation)
