= Businessmen's Military Training Corps =

- Active: January 1942 – 4 July 1945
- Country: United States
- Role: Patrol
- Size: 1,500
- Garrison/HQ: Honolulu, Hawaii

Commanders
- Commanding Officer: Col Willart L. Doering

The Businessmen's Military Training Corps was a white and part-Hawaiian militia unit to prevent collaboration of Japanese-Americans as a result of a Japanese invasion of Hawaii. The militia was made up of 17 companies, two thirds of which were World War I veterans. Their main activates were patrolling, security, and battle planning. In response to their bias toward whites the Hawaii Defense Volunteers a predominantly Chinese-American militia formed.

== See also ==
- Business Men's Training Corps
- Hawaii Territorial Guard
