= Delos Carleton Emmons =

United States Army general (1889–1965)

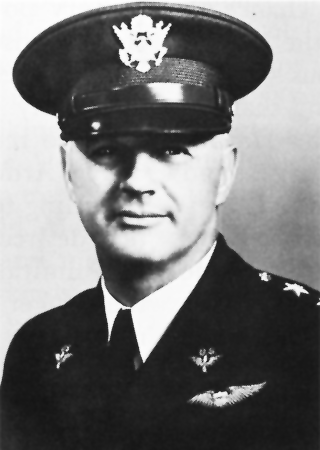
- Lieutenant General Delos C. Emmons
- Born: January 17, 1889; Huntington, West Virginia, U.S.
- Died: October 3, 1965 (aged 76); United States
- Military career
- Allegiance: United States
- Branch: United States Air Force
- Service years: 1909–1948
- Rank: Lieutenant General
- Commands: 1st Wing; Hawaiian Department; Western Defense Command
- Conflicts: World War I World War II
- Awards: Legion of Merit (2); Distinguished Flying Cross; Air Medal

Delos Carleton Emmons (January 17, 1889 – October 3, 1965) was a lieutenant general in the United States Army. He was the military governor of Hawaii in the aftermath of the Attack on Pearl Harbor and administered the replacement of normal U.S. banknotes with special war-emergency US banknotes in case the islands were invaded.

== Biography ==
He was born on January 17, 1889, in Huntington, West Virginia. He graduated from the United States Military Academy in June 1909 and was commissioned an infantry second lieutenant. Emmons was assigned as commanding officer of Company B, 30th Infantry Regiment at the Presidio of San Francisco and in May 1912 went to Fort Gibbon, Alaska with the 30th. He returned to Plattsburg Barracks, New York.

He became a first lieutenant in July 1916 and was detailed to the Signal Corps' Aviation Section for pilot training in August 1916. He was rated a junior military aviator in May 1917 and became a captain in July. Emmons next served as aeronautical officer of the Western Department at San Francisco and in December went to Washington as assistant executive in the Office of the Chief Signal Officer. The following June, Emmons was promoted to major and went to Mather Field, California. He became a lieutenant colonel in August and in December was transferred to McCook Field in Dayton, Ohio as assistant chief of the Engineering Division.

Emmons transferred to the U.S. Army Air Service in July 1920 and a year later completed the Air Service Course at Harvard University. He returned to McCook Field for three years as chief of Production Engineering. Emmons went to Crissy Field, California in August 1924, where he served as commanding officer, and then to Rockwell Field as commanding officer of the 91st Observation Squadron. He went to Washington, D.C., in August 1927 as executive officer for the chief of the Air Corps. He held the same assignment for the Assistant Secretary of War for Air, F. Trubee Davison, in October 1928. Emmons graduated from the Air Corps Tactical School at Maxwell Air Force Base, Alabama, and the Command and General Staff School at Fort Leavenworth, Kansas.

Emmons was concurrently commanding officer of the 18th Composite Wing and Air Officer of the Hawaiian Department at Fort Shafter in the Hawaiian Islands from March 1934 to July 1936. He became a colonel in March 1935. Emmons returned to the United States in July 1936 as commander of the 1st Wing, General Headquarters Air Force, at March Field, California, with promotion to brigadier general. Emmons received his second star in March 1939 as part of his appointment as commander of the GHQ Air Force at Langley Field, Virginia, succeeding Col. Frank Andrews, who was not reappointed after four years in the position and was returned to his permanent rank.

After the fall of France, the Americans and British increased their military cooperation; Emmons was one of three American military observers sent to London on August 6, 1940. He was promoted to lieutenant general in November 1940 when Army General Headquarters was activated, to make him equal in grade to the field army commanders of GHQ. He retained his command when GHQ Air Force was renamed Air Force Combat Command in June 1941 and made a part of the new United States Army Air Forces. This however caused command difficulties since he was now superior in rank to his boss, Major General Henry Arnold, the new Chief of the Army Air Forces.

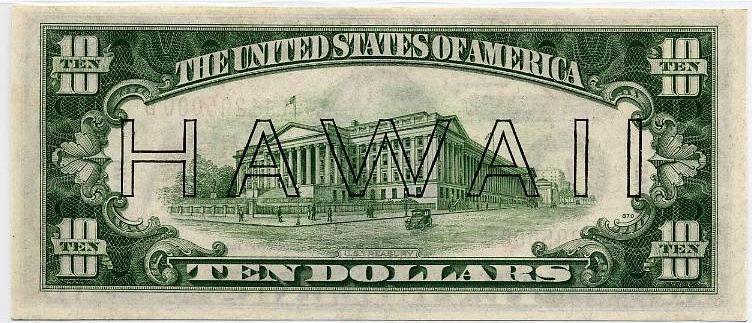
Emergency invasion-resistance U.S. banknote overprinted HAWAII; with such distinctive markings, these easily recognized Hawaii bills could be declared void if the island were occupied by the enemy.

Emmons was returned by Arnold to Hawaii as commanding general of the Hawaiian Department on December 17, ten days after the attack on Pearl Harbor. He encouraged the creation of volunteer defense units. He organized the replacement of the island's U.S. banknotes with new dollars overprinted with the word HAWAII; if the area were occupied, U.S. authorities could declare all marked dollars void and thereby render worthless all money which fell into enemy hands (by their capture of banks, businesses, etc.). He also requested Army Air Force Headquarters to send additional planes and received them as rapidly as possible. Emmons built up the forces in Hawaii, anticipating the Battle of Midway. This was the only combat command he held during the war. Emmons promised the local Japanese American community in Hawaii that they would be treated fairly so long as they remained loyal to the United States, and he succeeded in blocking efforts to relocate them to the outer islands or mainland in internment camps by pointing out the logistical difficulties.

Returning to the United States in June 1943, Emmons was assigned three months later as commanding general of the Western Defense Command at the Presidio of San Francisco. Emmons headed the Alaskan Department at Fort Richardson from June 1944 until June 1946. He became commandant of the Armed Forces Staff College at Norfolk, Virginia, in August 1946 and remained in that position until he retired June 30, 1948.

== Awards and decorations ==
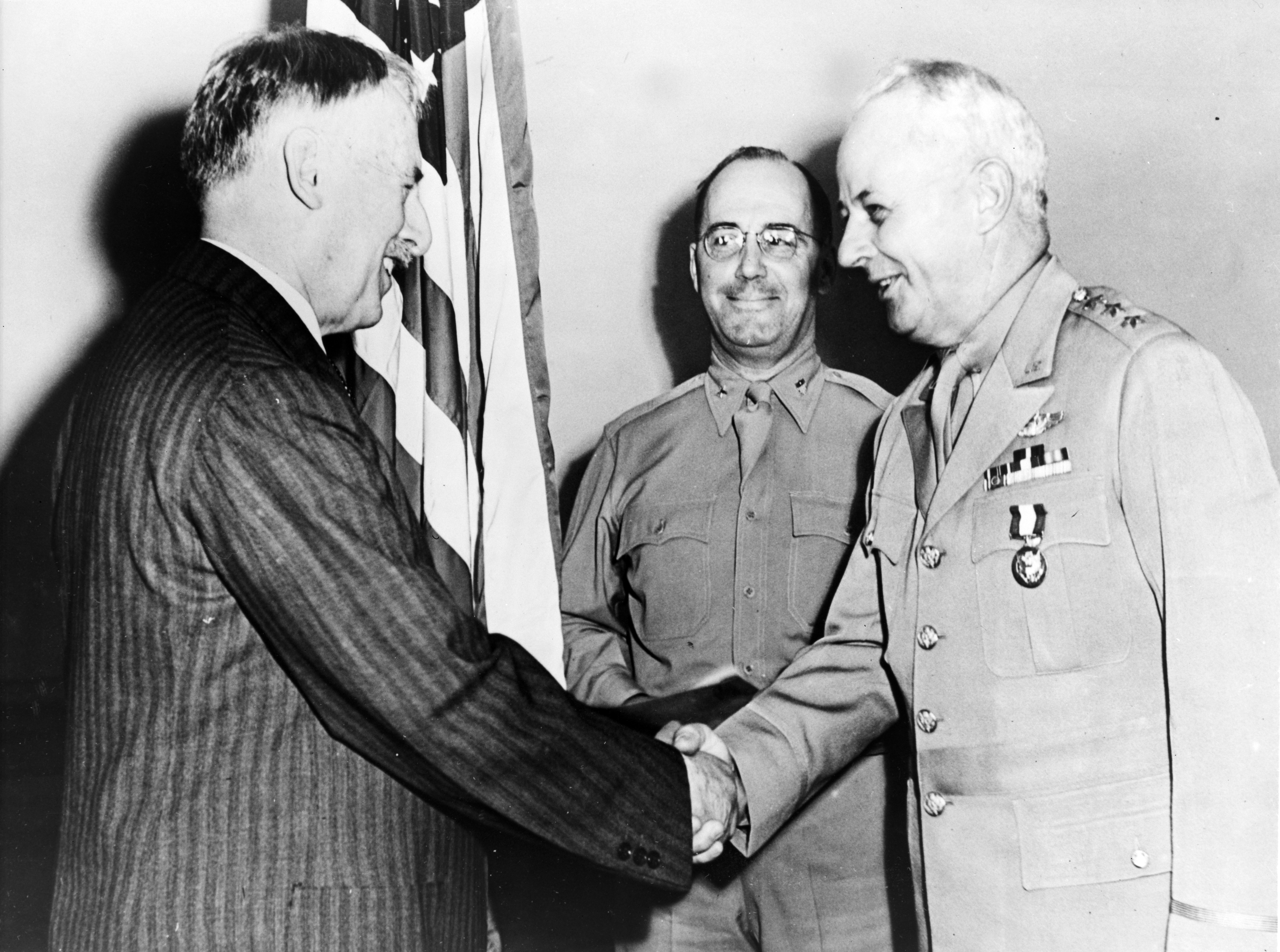
Emmons being awarded the Army Distinguished Service Medal by Secretary of War Henry L. Stimson. BG Henry B. Lewis is in the background.

General Emmons' awards and decorations include the Army Distinguished Service Medal with two Oak Leaf Clusters; the Navy Distinguished Service Medal, Legion of Merit with Oak Leaf Cluster; Distinguished Flying Cross; Air Medal with Oak Leaf Cluster; American Defense Service Medal with Foreign Service Clasp; American Campaign Medal; Asiatic-Pacific Campaign Medal with Bronze Star; World War I Victory Medal; World War II Victory Medal; Mexican Border Service Medal.

1st Row	Army Distinguished Service Medal with two clusters	Navy Distinguished Service Medal	Legion of Merit with cluster	
2nd Row	Distinguished Flying Cross	Air Medal with cluster	Mexican Border Service Medal	World War I Victory Medal
3rd Row	American Defense Service Medal with Foreign Service Clasp	American Campaign Medal	Asiatic-Pacific Campaign Medal with one star	World War II Victory Medal

== Dates of rank ==
Insignia	Rank	Component	Date
No pin insignia in 1909	Second Lieutenant	Regular Army	11 June 1909
	First Lieutenant	Regular Army	1 July 1916
	Captain	Regular Army	17 May 1917
	Major	National Army	7 June 1918
	Lieutenant Colonel	National Army	20 August 1918
	Reverted to permanent rank of Captain	Regular Army	1 March 1920
	Major	Regular Army	1 July 1920
	Lieutenant Colonel	Regular Army	26 May 1934
	Colonel	Temporary	2 March 1935
	Brigadier General	Temporary	16 June 1936
	Colonel	Regular Army	1 July 1938
	Major General	Temporary	1 March 1939
	Lieutenant General	Army of the United States	25 October 1940
	Brigadier General	Regular Army	31 May 1941
	Major General	Regular Army	23 August 1941
	Lieutenant General	Retired List	30 June 1948

== Personal life ==
Emmons is the grandson of the co-founder of Huntington, West Virginia, Delos W. Emmons. Which makes Emmons a great-nephew of Collis P. Huntington.
