= Women's Army Volunteer Corps =

Women’s Army Volunteer Corp
- Active: August 1942 – 1945
- Country: United States
- Branch: U.S. Army
- Type: Paramilitary
- Role: Secretary; Vehicle operator
- Size: 400
- Part of: Women's Army Corps

Commanders
- Field Director: Mrs. Marjorie S. Breffeilh

The Women's Army Volunteer Corps (WAVC) was an organization within the Women's Army Auxiliary Corps (WAAC) which later became the Women's Army Corps (WAC) in which women could serve as office assistants or military bus drivers.

During World War II, women’s branches were created by the Naval Reserves who had the Women Accepted for Volunteer Emergency Service (WAVES) and the Marine's had the Marine Corps Women’s Reserves (USMCWR).

== History ==
The WAVC was a civilian militia unit in Hawaii along with the Hawaii Air Depot Volunteer Corps. It was formed in 1942 by women employees of the Office of the Military Governor, and numbered 400 personnel. The group of female employees of Honolulu Engineer District and Hawaii Constructors were put through six weeks of special training in order to be able to assist the District with first aid, evacuation drills, and other duties normally performed by men.

After the WAC was organized, the WAVC became federally recognized as a part of the Organized Defense Reserves.
