= Hawaii Defense Volunteers =

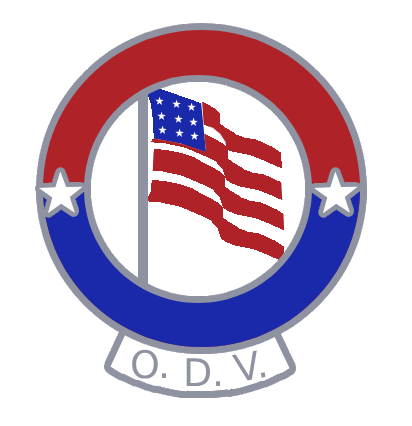
Hawaiian Organized Defense Volunteers Pin

The Hawaii Organized Defense Volunteers were a number of militia groups that were organized after the December 7, 1941 attack on Pearl Harbor. In January 1942, Lt. Gen. Delos Emmons issued orders encouraging the creation of volunteer defense groups. Volunteers served without pay and provided their own uniforms. Many of the officers and NCOs had previous training in the regular Army, National Guard, ROTC or state militia. Volunteer units were encouraged to participate in training at the Pacific Combat Training Center. The volunteer units were released from federal control on July 4, 1945.

== Individual Volunteer Units ==
First Regiment Oahu Volunteer Infantry (Hawaii Scouts)

Organized in June 1942 in Waialua, Kahuku and Wahiawa, they were renamed the First Regiment Hawaii Scouts. They were assigned to assist regular military forces against attack. In 1945, their commanding officer was Col. Leo B. Rodby.

First Regiment Oahu Volunteer Infantry (Hawaii Scouts)

Organized immediately after the attack, they were divided into the Ewa, Aiea and Waimanalo-Kaneohe sectors. They were assigned to the Hawaii Provost Marshal. In 1945, their commanding officer was Col. Richard Penhallow.

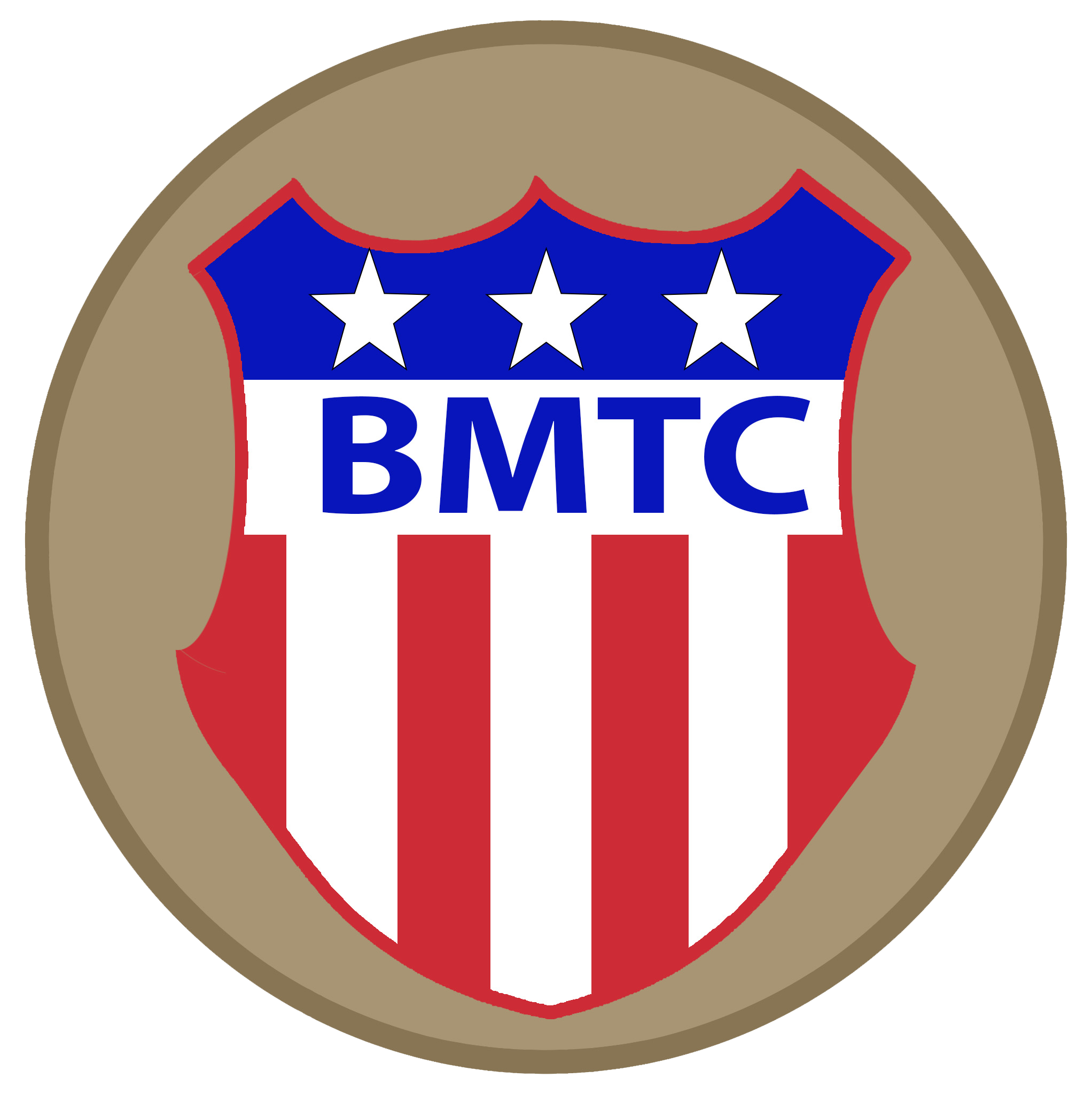
Businessmen's Military Training Corps

Businessmen's Military Training Corps (BMTC)

Organized in January 1942 by a group of Honolulu business leaders. The training of the BMTC was under officers of several US Army Infantry Divisions as well as a boot camp run by Edgar Rice Burroughs. The BMTC was assigned to night guard duty of important military installations. In 1945, their commanding officer was Col. Willard L. Doering.

Hawaii Defense Volunteers (HDV)

Around April 1942 the Hawaii Defense Volunteers were organized by business leaders in Hawaii's non-White populations on the island of Oahu. They argued that only they could root out the non-loyal or spies in the various ethnic communities. They included residents of Chinese, Filipino, Hawaiian, Puerto Rican and Haole communities. They were assigned to duty as guards for utilities, quartermaster areas, and military government offices. In 1945, their commanding officer was Col. Richard Tongg.

First Regiment Hawaii Rifles

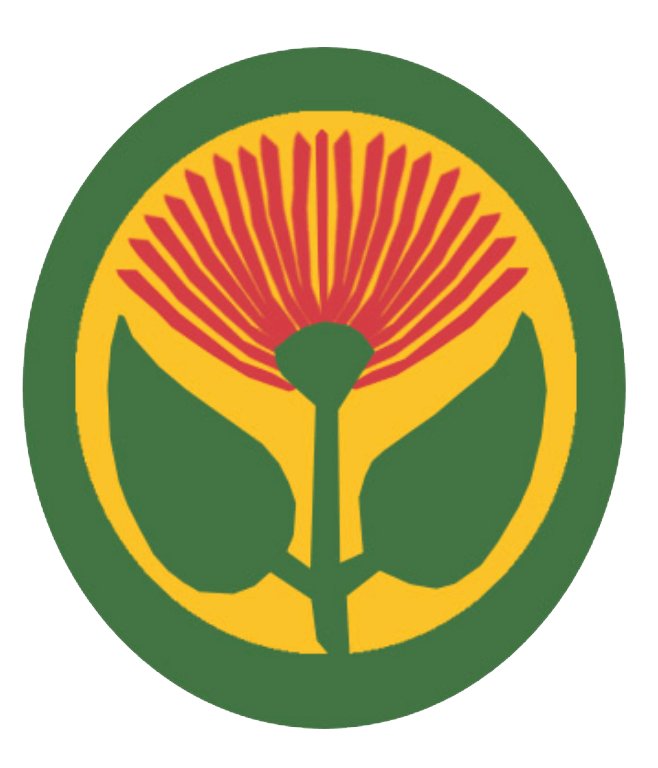
Hawaii Rifles Shoulder Sleeve Insignia

In February 1942, a group of citizens in the Hilo and Puna areas organized a company of volunteers to assist in anti-sabotage and other actions against the enemy under Col. Andrew T. Spalding (a former commander of the 299th Infantry). By May of 1942, the unit was headquartered at the National Park Service headquarters building. The park service was also providing the Rifles with training sites. The unit was assigned to patrol 22 miles of coastline.

Second Regiment Hawaii Rifles (Kohala Battalion)

J. Scott Pratt submitted a plan for volunteers to defend Kohala to the Army. It was approved and they began in February 1942. The second's mission was similar to the first regiment's and Pratt became its Colonel.

Hawaii Rifles Enlisted Insignia
Master Sergeant	Tech Sergeant	Staff Sergeant	First Sergeant	Tech 5	Sergeant	Tech 4	Corporal	Private First Class	Private

Hawaii Rifles Officer Insignia
Colonel	Lieutenant Colonel	Major	Captain	1st Lieutenant	2nd Lieutenant	Warrant Officer

First Regiment Maui Volunteers

In February 1942, Col. Charles Lyman organized a meeting of sugar and pineapple plantation managers to discuss forming a volunteer defense group. This included a cavalry unit called "The Mounties." In 1945, their commanding officer was Col. Elmore P. Lydgate.

Molokai-Lanai Volunteers

In April 1942, L. Thornton Lyman helped organize four companies of infantry and a platoon of cavalry on the island of Molokai. They assisted the Army with defense of the small island.

First Regiment Kauai Volunteers

In March 1942, a group of volunteers were raised consisting of mainly Filipino about the size of a regiment. In July 1945, their commanding officer was Paul H. Townsley.

== See also ==
- Hawaii Territorial Guard
