= Avery (given name) =

- Pronunciation: /ˈeɪvəri/ AY-vər-ee or /ˈeɪvri/ AYV-ree
- Gender: Unisex
- Language: English, Old English, Norman French

Origin
- Derivation: Ælfred
- Meaning: "Elf-counsel"

Other names
- Alternative spelling: Averie, Averi, Avry
- See also: Alfred, Alf, Alberich, Aubrey

Avery is traditionally a male given name ultimately derived from the Old English name Ælfred (Old English form of Alfred), which is formed from the elements ælf 'elf' and ræd 'counsel', and literally translates to 'elf-counsel'.

Beginning in the late 20th century, Avery began to also be used as a female given name and sometimes appears with the feminine alternative spellings Averie or Averi.

== Regional popularity ==
=== North America ===
The name is now a much more popular given name for girls than for boys in the United States and Canada. In the U.S. in 2021, it ranked 19th in popularity for girls, and 221st for boys. The same year in Canada, it ranked 33rd for girls and 159th for boys. In 2022, it had dropped to 40th and 181st respectively in Canada.

In one study of babies born in the State of Pennsylvania between 1990 and 2010, more girls were named Avery than boys in each year studied.

=== Great Britain ===
In England and Wales, Avery is less popular over all and is used as both a masculine and feminine name with similar frequency, though still slightly more for girls. In 2021, it ranked 355th for girls and 433rd for boys.

== Alternative etymology ==
It has also been suggested that it could possibly be a derivation of the Germanic name Alberich which, if true, would make it a doublet of Aubrey.

== Notable people with the name ==
=== As a male name ===
- Avery Caesar Alexander (1910–1999), American civil rights leader and Louisiana politician
- Avery Anderson (born 1997), American politician
- Avery Anderson III (born 2000), American basketball player
- Avery Atkins (1987–2007), American football player
- Avery August (born 1964), American scientist, vice provost at Cornell University
- Avery Aylsworth (born 1996), American volleyball player
- Avery Blake, American college lacrosse player and coach
- Avery Bradley (born 1990), American professional basketball player
- Avery Brooks (born 1948), American actor, director, singer, and educator best known for his role as Benjamin Sisko in Star Trek: Deep Space Nine
- Avery Brundage (1887–1975), American sports administrator, President of the International Olympic Committee, 1952–1972
- Alfred Avery Burnham (1819–1879), U.S. Representative from Connecticut
- Avery Cardoza, American author, professional gambler and publisher
- Avery Claflin (1898–1979), American composer who studied law and business and pursued a career in banking
- Avery Clayton (1947–2009), American nonprofit executive, established a library and museum to house African American artefacts
- Avery Corman (born 1935), American novelist
- Elisha Avery Crary (1905–1978), United States District Judge of the United States District Court
- Avery Craven (1885–1980), American historian who wrote about the nineteenth-century United States
- Avery Dulles (1918–2008), American Jesuit priest, theologian, and Cardinal of the Catholic Church
- Avery E. Field (1883–1955), photographer in Riverside, California
- Avery Fisher (1906–1994), American businessman, founder of Fisher Electronics
- Avery Garrett (1916–1988), American politician in the state of Washington
- Avery Gilbert, American geneticist, self-described "smell scientist" and "sensory psychologist"
- Avery Hopwood (1882–1928), American playwright of the Jazz Age
- Richard Avery Hornsby, English military figure from the 18th century
- Alan Avery Allen Horsley, British Anglican priest and author in the 20th century
- Frank Avery Hutchins (1851–1914), American educator and librarian
- Avery "Kid" Howard (1908–1966), American jazz trumpeter associated with the New Orleans jazz scene
- Avery Jenkins (born 1978), American professional disc golfer
- Avery John (born 1975), Trinidadian soccer player
- Avery Johnson (born 1965), American basketball coach
- Frederick Avery Johnson (1833–1893), American politician and banker
- Francis Avery Jones (1910–1998), Welsh physician and gastroenterologist
- Isaiah Avery "Zay" Jones (born 1995), American football wide receiver
- Avery Kay, United States Air Force colonel, designer of the A-10 Warthog
- Avery Kier (1905–1987), United States Marine Corps aviator and general officer
- G. Avery Lee (1916–2008), Southern Baptist and American Baptist preacher
- Max Avery Lichtenstein, American record producer, composer and songwriter
- Avery Lipman, American music industry executive
- John Avery Lomax (1867–1948), American teacher, a pioneering musicologist and folklorist
- Elias Avery Lowe (1879–1969), Lithuanian–American palaeographer
- C. Avery Mason (1904–1970), bishop of the Episcopal Diocese of Dallas
- Gerald Avery Mays (1939–1994), American football player and defensive lineman
- Edward Avery McIlhenny (1872–1949), American businessman, explorer, bird bander and conservationist
- John Avery McIlhenny (1867–1942), American businessman, soldier, politician and public servant
- Avery Bryan Morris (born 1987), American professional baseball pitcher
- Avery Moss (born 1994), American football outside linebacker
- Avery Ng (born 1976), Hong Kong politician and social activist
- Avery Paraiso (born 1994), Filipino-Irish commercial model and actor
- Avery Parrish (1917–1959), American jazz pianist, composer and arranger
- Avery Patterson, American football safety
- Harry Avery Reid (1877–1947), British veterinarian, bacteriologist and pathologist
- Avery Robinson (1878–1965), American classical composer
- Avery Rockefeller (1903–1986), American investment banker and conservationist
- Percy Avery Rockefeller (1878–1934), American board director, founder of Owenoke Corporation
- William Avery Rockefeller (1810–1906), American businessman, lumberman and salesman
- Michael Avery Ross (born 1961), American businessman and politician
- Avery Saltzman, Canadian actor and theater director
- Avery Scharer (born 1986), Filipino-American professional basketball player
- Avery Schreiber (1935–2002), American comedian and actor
- Avery W. Severance (1819–1874), American farmer and politician from New York
- Avery Sharpe (born 1954), American jazz double-bassist
- Avery Judd Skilton (1802–1858), American physician and naturalist
- Avery Skinner (1796–1876), American politician from New York
- Avery Stafford (born 1965), gospel and R&B vocalist from the United States
- Avery Storm (born 1981), American R&B singer
- Earl Avery Thompson (1891–1967), American engineer and inventor
- Avery Trufelman, American podcaster and radio producer
- Avery C. Upchurch (1928–1994), American politician
- Avery Warley (born 1987), American professional basketball player
- Avery Weems (born 1997), American baseball player
- Avery Williams (disambiguation), multiple people
- Avery Williamson (born 1992), American football linebacker
- Avery Wilson (born 1995), American singer-songwriter and dancer
- Avery Young (born 1992), American football player

=== As a female name ===
- Avery Anna (born 2004), American singer-songwriter
- Averie Bishop, American businessperson, social media personality, and beauty pageant titleholder
- Avery Bourne, Republican member, Illinois House of Representatives
- Avery Jae Clemens, American model, transgender activist, social media influencer, and writer
- Nicole Avery Cox, American actress and comedy writer
- Avery Haines, Canadian television journalist
- Avery Howell (born 2006), Canadian basketball player
- Avery Yale Kamila, American journalist and community organizer
- Avery Krumme (born 2008), American freestyle skier
- Avery Patterson (born 2002), American soccer player
- Avery Singer, American artist known for creating digitally assisted paintings
- Avery Skinner, American volleyball player

== Fictional characters ==
- Avery Bullock, in the animated TV series American Dad!, voiced by Patrick Stewart
- Avery Carrington, a real estate tycoon in the video game Grand Theft Auto: Vice City
- Avery Bailey Clark, from the American television series The Young and the Restless
- Avery Jessup, a romantic interest of Jack Donaghy in the sitcom TV series 30 Rock
- Avery Johnson, a character from the Halo video game series
- Avery Ryan, FBI Deputy Director in the drama TV series CSI: Crime Scene Investigation
- Laura Avery Sumner, from the CBS soap opera TV series Knots Landing
