= Hultstrand =

Hultstrand is a surname. Notable people with the surname include:

- Donald M. Hultstrand (1927–2018), American Episcopal bishop
- Fred Hultstrand (1888–1968), American photographer
