= Mayme Agnew Clayton =

American librarian (1923–2006)

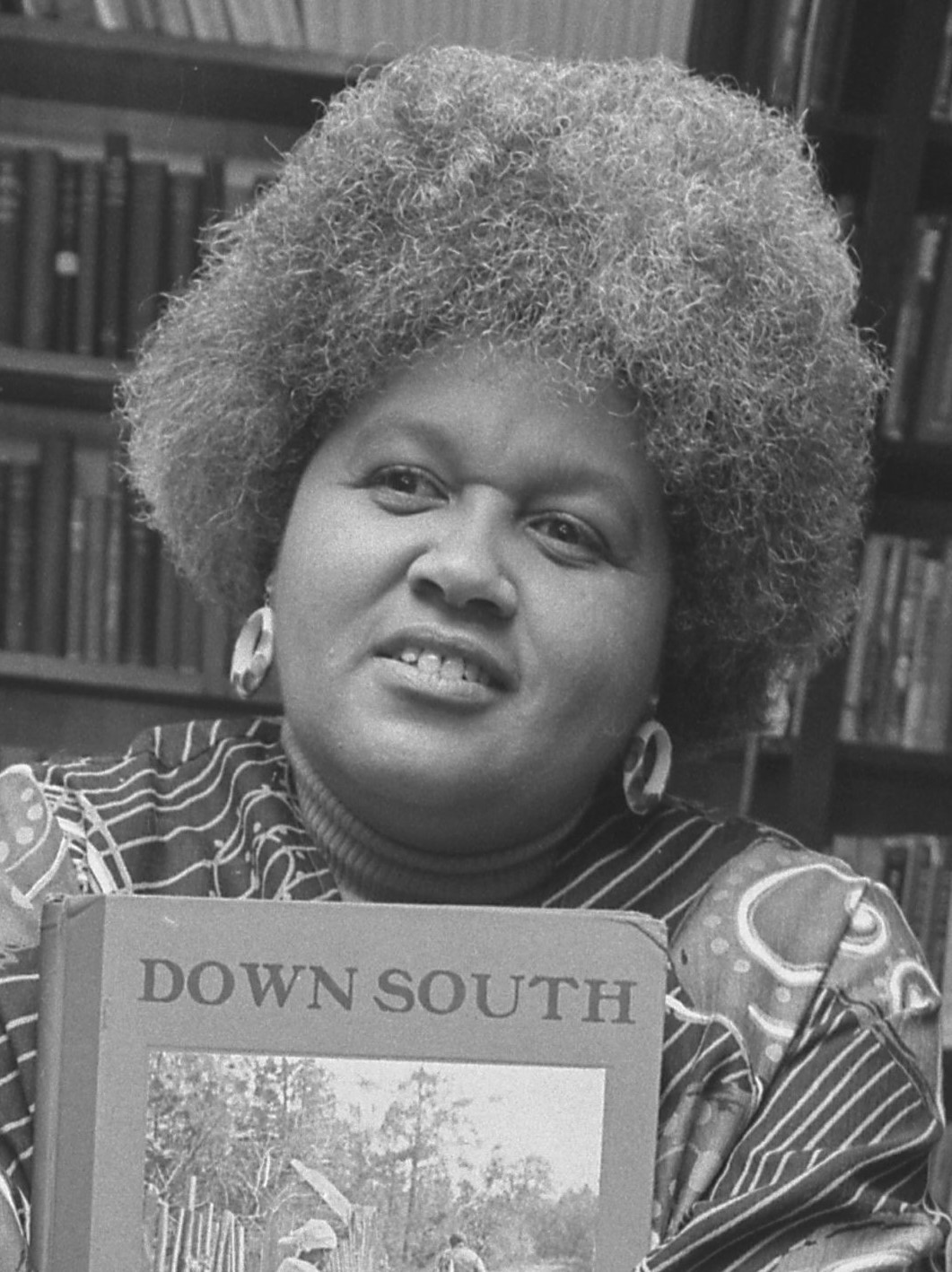
- Clayton in 1973
- Born: August 4, 1923; Van Buren, Arkansas, U.S.
- Died: October 13, 2006 (aged 83); U.S.
- Occupation: Librarian

Mayme Agnew Clayton (August 4, 1923 – October 13, 2006) was a librarian, and the founder, president, and leader of the Western States Black Research and Education Center (WSBREC), the largest privately held collection of African-American historical materials in the world. The collection represents the core holdings of the Mayme A. Clayton Library and Museum (MCLM), formerly located in Culver City, California. This collection was curated and managed by her son, Avery Clayton. The museum is the largest and most academically substantial independently held collection of objects, documents, and memorabilia on African American history and culture. On July 31, 2019, the Mayme A. Clayton Library and Museum closed permanently. The bulk of its collections went to the West Los Angeles College in unincorporated Los Angeles County on a temporary basis.

Over the course of 45 years, Clayton single-handedly, and with her own resources, collected more than 30,000 rare and out-of-print books. The collection is considered one of the most important for African-American materials and consists of 3.5 million items, according to UCLA Magazine. Her collecting grew from her work as a librarian, first at the University of Southern California and later at the University of California, Los Angeles, where she began to build an African-American collection. "Ms. Clayton, an avid golfer, traveled for her sport, trolling for rare finds wherever she went. The centerpiece of the collection that grew this way is a signed copy of Phillis Wheatley’s Poems on Various Subjects, Religious and Moral, from 1773. First published by an American of African descent, the book was acquired for $600 from a New York dealer in 1973. In 2002 it was appraised at $30,000," according to the New York Times.

Other items in her collection include movie posters (one featuring Stepin Fetchit), newspaper clippings regarding actress Dorothy Dandridge, and a letter handwritten by educator Booker T. Washington.

== Biography ==
Mayme Agnew was born in Van Buren, Arkansas, on August 4, 1923. Her father, Jerry Agnew, Sr., owned and operated a general store, the only black-owned business in Van Buren. Clayton’s mother, Mary Knight Agnew, was a homemaker and renowned Southern cook, whose dinner gatherings drew friends from far and near. She had two siblings, Jerry, Jr. and Sarah Elizabeth (a well-known Southern California educator). Jerry and Mary consciously chose to expose their children to African Americans of accomplishment. During a 1936 visit to Arkansas by Mary McLeod Bethune, Clayton’s parents drove a significant distance to be sure that their children could hear her speak. Dr. Bethune remained a "lifelong inspiration for Dr. Clayton," according to the MCLM website.

She first attended Lincoln University of Missouri before transferring to University of California, Berkeley, where she received a B.A.

She moved to New York City in her 20s, met Andrew Lee Clayton, and they married in 1946, then moved to a bungalow in the West Adams neighborhood of Los Angeles.

She began her career at USC in 1952, until she became a law librarian for UCLA in 1957. In 1969 she helped establish the university’s African-American Studies Center Library, and began to buy out-of-print works by authors from the Harlem Renaissance. However, she was often denied the funds to purchase African-American books. Believing that it was important for this literature to be collected, she began collecting her own books, taking an early retirement from UCLA. This collection included Chicano and Native American works as well as African-American works.

She earned an MLS from Goddard College in Vermont, and was awarded a PhD in Humanities from La Sierra University in 1985.

In addition to her work with Western States Black Research Center, she also sold books through her company, Third World Ethnic Books, and supported black filmmakers through the Black American Cinema Society. Throughout the 1980s and early 1990s, Clayton raised money for these organizations by hosting golf tournaments, awards ceremonies, and film screenings, often called "Black Talkies on Parade".
