= Otto Hillig =

American photographer (1874–1954)

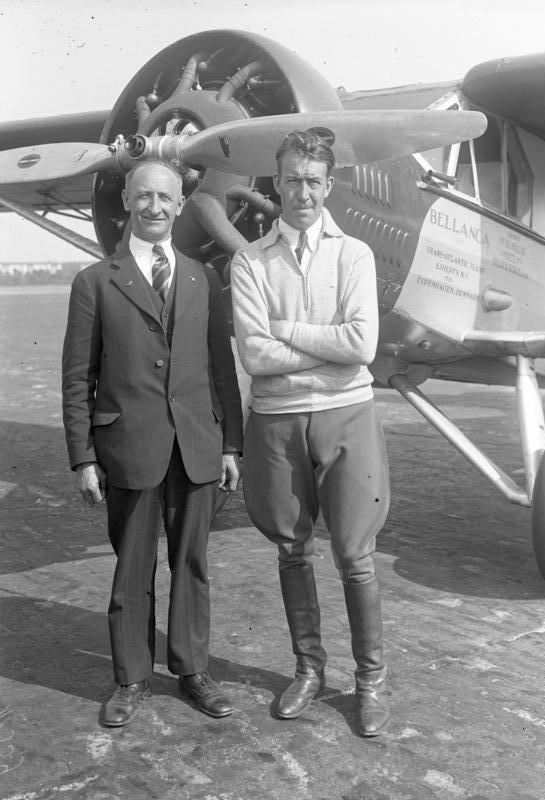
Hillig (left) and Hoiriis after their transatlantic flight in 1931

Otto Hillig (1874–1954) lived most of his life in Liberty, New York, and gained fame as a photographer and transatlantic flier. He also had a German-style castle constructed for him near Parksville, New York, and served one term in the New York State Assembly.

== Early years ==
Hillig arrived in America by ship, at the age of 17, in 1891. From a farming family in Germany, he listed his calling as "farmer" in his arrival documents.

Although he arrived unaccompanied, Hillig had a step-brother who was already in the country: Ernest Schubert, son of Hillig's mother's second husband. Schubert was a couple of years older than Hillig and he arrived in the U.S. a year before him. According to Schubert, he helped Hillig out, financially, a couple of times. First, he helped to finance Otto's voyage to America; then, some years later, he helped Hillig set up his own photography studio.

Early on, Hillig obtained a cheap camera, which he enjoyed using. Supporting himself by various jobs, he eventually made his way to a tourist region, the Catskills in New York State, where tourists would pay for him to take their pictures. Within a few years, he became prosperous by his photography. Besides his portraiture, he produced popular sets of picture postcards and tourist booklets, whose quality remains highly regarded. His "up-to-date" studio in Liberty, New York, was established and regularly advertised by 1898.

Around that same time, Hillig saved to study formally at the Illinois College of Photography in Effingham, Illinois. He entered a first term in residence in 1900, and returned there for some additional course work in 1904. He was always eager to learn, and try new techniques in his field by, for example, experimenting with aerial photography and taking moving pictures.

At Effingham College he met a fellow student, June H. Carr, who eventually became a respected photographer, in his own right. Carr briefly became a partner in Hillig's business in Liberty in 1900, before leaving to get married and establish his own business.

Hillig also added to his wealth, at times, by diversifying his business activities. This included, some real estate investments and taking orders in his studio for musical supplies and instruments.

== Travel ==
Once he could afford it, he began to buy—and run through—'motorcars', owning one of the first such vehicles in Sullivan County. His experiments with their speed and maneuverability contributed to his various run-ins with a truck, one or more telephone poles, and a horse-drawn carriage. He once earned the nickname "The Flying Dutchman", years before any involvement with airplanes: It happened when he totalled a car in a burst of flames, after rendering it airborne, and he survived in one piece.

In 1916, Hillig toured North America by car, driving 9500 miles with a friend. He also acquired a taste for publicity, submitting humorous updates of his tour progress to local newspapers. When he returned, he entertained audiences with humorous talks about his exploits, and lobbied for Liberty to install modern, electrical street lighting, as adopted in other cities.

In 1929, Hillig paid $9,000 for a seat on the flight of the Graf Zeppelin around the globe, and drew the public's interest for his signing up. That venture fell through because, by most accounts, the flight organizers double-sold Hillig's seat. But Hillig sued for damages. Settling out of court, he received $25,000, plus a refund for his ticket cost.

Those funds enabled Hillig to buy his own, new plane in 1931. With his plane, he planned a transatlantic flight to Denmark (the homeland of his intended pilot, Holger Hoiriis), and then on to Germany. He named his plane "Liberty", as part of "repaying Liberty for its part in his good fortune." A local editor lauded this project for bringing great publicity to his adopted city.

Hillig claimed he was making that expensive and risky flight "just for the fun of it" or "for the thrill". He was not driven, like other fliers of the era, to be 'the first' to fly the furthest. For example, on June 24, 1931, Hillig and his pilot were on pace to be the first team of that flying season to leave Harbor Grace, Newfoundland. That was considered the jumping-off point for flying to Europe. But when another flight team, Wiley Post and Harold Gatty, caught up to them, and scrambled to be the first ones to set off to Europe, Hillig and Hoiriis actually helped the other team get ready to take off. Hillig's modest goal was just "to be remembered pleasantly when I am remembered at all, as the man who flew the Atlantic and then came on back home and went to work."

Some highlights of Hillig's plane trip included getting an audience with the King of Denmark, and getting knighted. (King Christian was a "Brother Mason" to Hillig.) Despite the risks of flying there, he refused to load a radio or lifeboat on the plane, saving the room for gas. They ran out of gas on the flight over Germany, anyway, from having strayed off course in bad weather so, they had to land initially short of their objective, Denmark.

== Hillig's Castle ==
About three years after that flight, and after invitations to give talks about it had become less frequent, Hillig began to have a castle built, with a turret. Inspired by castles he'd seen in Germany, he had it "made entirely of (local) Neversink River stone, (and) nestled prominently on the top of Mount Washington", near Liberty. (That "mount" is now simply called "Castle Hill".)

As castles go, it was rather small, and he never lived in it full time. Some students who saw it on a field trip once described it as "a one-room cabin that was furnished like a hunting cabin…. On one side … is a tower with a large bell on top of it." It was mostly a place where Otto could store his souvenirs, and host picnics and meetings of groups he belonged to, such as a Masonic Lodge and a Lutheran Church brotherhood, and invite school groups for field trips on the grounds. When Otto Hillig died, he bequeathed the whole property and the castle to the Masons, and left considerable funds to other local churches, as well.

== Family ==
In November 1901, Hillig married Irish-born Margaret Withers in Welland, Ontario, Canada, a town not far from Niagara Falls. (There is no evidence she lived in Canada.) They separated after a few years, and Hillig eventually went to Reno, Nevada, to sue for divorce.

Hillig's mother, Pauline Fischer Hillig Schubert, and her second husband, Karl Schubert (father of Otto's step-brother), lived roughly a mile from Otto's home in Liberty, after they had arrived from Germany in 1905. Mrs. Schubert, widowed in 1913, was killed in a kitchen fire in 1915.

Before that tragic event, in 1914, Otto's German niece, Elsa Hillig, arrived in New York alone by ship, at age 16. Otto, her uncle, was named in the ship's passenger list as Elsa's "person in U.S," (sponsor). She lived in Hillig's apartment block for years until, at age 23, she married Herman Bressler. Occasionally, members of Elsa's family, which grew to include ten children, picnicked at Hillig's castle.

Hillig stayed, when ill in his final days, at the home of Herman Bressler, who was then a widower. In Hillig's will, he left $1000 each (roughly equivalent to $10,000 today) to each of Elsa's ten children, and another $1000 to Herman Bressler.

Some time after he and wife separated, Hillig took on a photography apprentice, Thomas Dewhurst. Thomas moved into Hillig's household, near Hillig's studio. Thomas's mother was Minnie Withers Dewhurst, who appears to have been the oldest sister of Margaret Withers, Otto's ex-wife. The Dewhursts were Otto's in-laws. Minnie and her husband ran a boarding house, and lived not far from Liberty in the early 1900's, when Otto and Margaret were still together.

When Minnie's husband died in 1908, she was left alone her three children, the youngest aged just 7. She also cared for a 7-year-old nephew, Charles Withers, who lived with them. By 1915, Minnie moved with all her children into Hillig's apartment block, though various members moved out over the years. Thomas Dewhurst remained single, and he and Minnie remained in Hillig's apartments most years up until Minnie's passing in 1944. In his will, Hillig provided for all of Minnie Dewhurst's children, and to her grandchild—giving $1000 to each.

== Legacy ==
Hillig put Liberty on the map, at least briefly. For a tourist region like Liberty, Otto Hillig's acclaim was a boon for the whole region, drawing attention to that tourist destination.

He kept enough name-awareness to be elected for one term (1937) as a New York State Assemblyman. He advocated there for better support of aviation in New York State, and for getting an airport for Sullivan County. He moved four bills (not just the aviation bills) that got passed by the legislative houses, which was an above-average accomplishment.

After those active years, he did exactly what he promised in his various talks and articles in the 1930's about his flight: He returned to private life, doing his good work, helping out family, and contributing to community organizations.
