= Ellery Valdimir Wilcox =

American photographer

Ellery Valdimir Wilcox (1882–1960) was an American photographer. After studying at the Illinois College of Photography at Effingham, Illinois, and working across a large portion of the central United States roughly bounded by South Dakota, Missouri, and Ohio, he settled in 1912 in Scotland, South Dakota, where he maintained a studio until 1947.

22 of his photographs of Native Americans are in the National Anthropological Archives of the Smithsonian Institution.
