= Delaware Wing Civil Air Patrol =

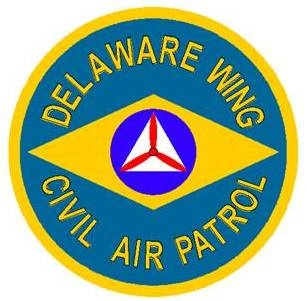
- Delaware Wing of Civil Air Patrol

Associated branches
- United States Air Force

Command staff
- Commander: Col Kay Rudo
- Deputy Commander: Lt Col John Lierenz
- Chief of Staff: Lt Col Victor Kyler

Current statistics
- Cadets: 137
- Seniors: 247
- Total Membership: 384
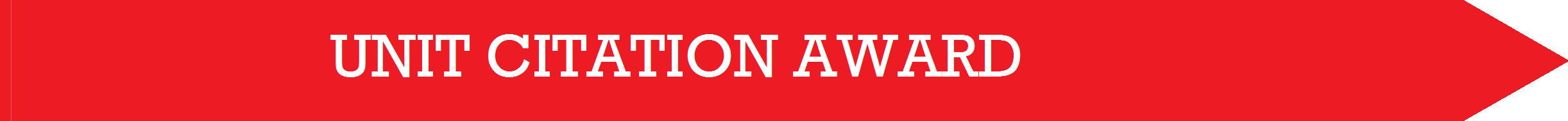
- Awards: Unit Citation Award
- Website: dewg.cap.gov
- Statistics as of 29 April 2024

Delaware Wing Civil Air Patrol is the highest echelon of Civil Air Patrol (CAP) in the state of Delaware. Delaware Wing headquarters is located at Dover Air Force Base. It comprises seven squadrons from Claymont to Georgetown, and a unit just over the border in Elkton, Maryland. Delaware Wing is abbreviated as DEWG. As a federally chartered organization, CAP has 3 primary missions as instructed by Congress. The missions include providing aerospace education and training for all of its members, teaching leadership skills to Delaware youth, and performing various domestic emergency services for the United States of America in a noncombatant capacity.

== History ==
Delaware Wing has a long CAP history since CAP's inception in 1941. Delaware is home to one of the original "Coastal Patrol" units, based in Rehoboth Beach. Using private aircraft, the "Flying Minute Men" patrolled the Atlantic Ocean for German submarines. They operated off of a small, unpaved airport near Airport Road in Delaware. Civil Air Patrol planes that crashed in the line of duty while patrolling the United States East Coast during World War II were hauled to the historical Dover Post building, which was an aircraft hangar at the time.

== Missions ==
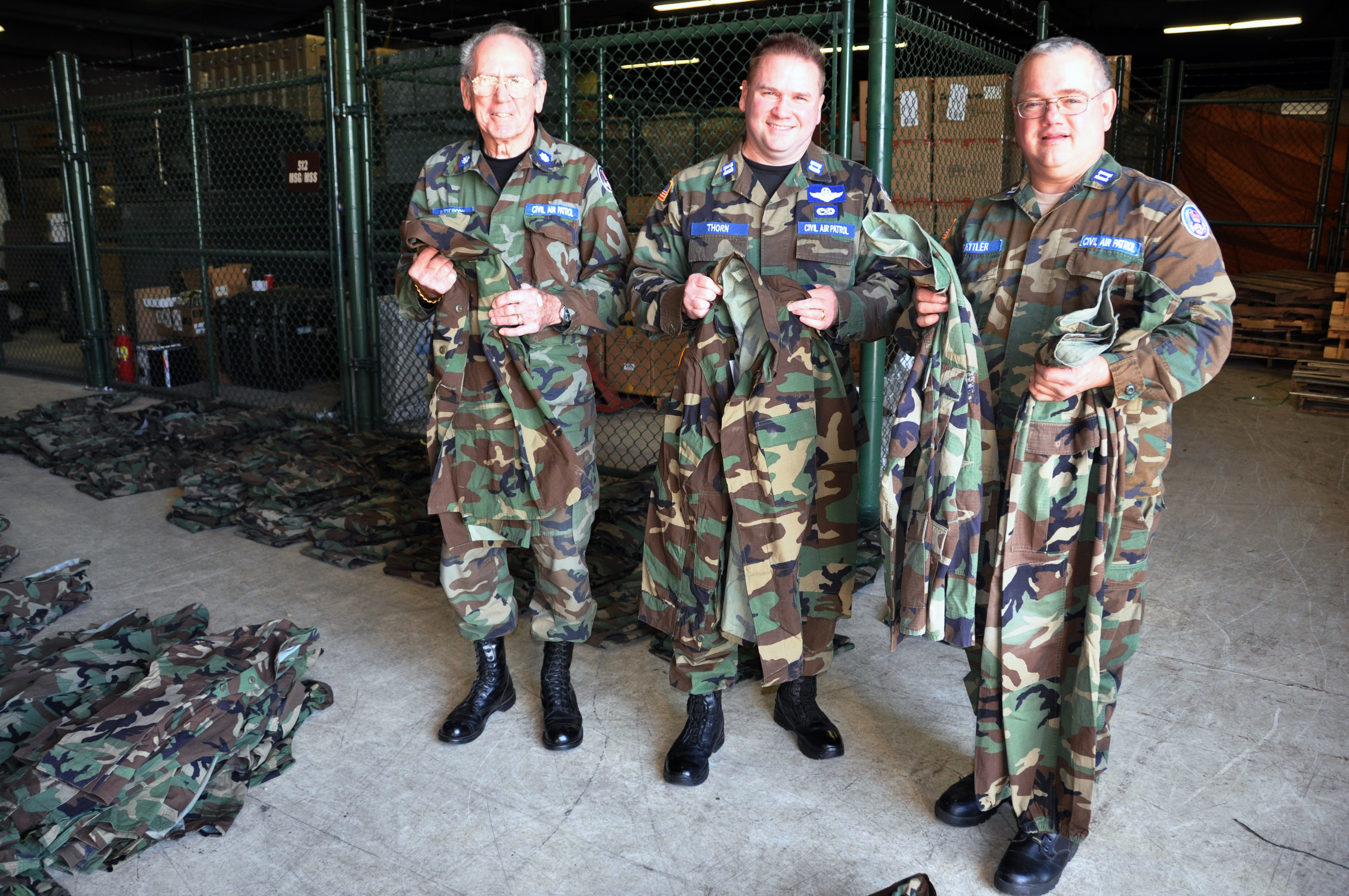
CAP officers collect uniforms donated to Delaware and Pennsylvania CAP units by the Delaware National Guard.

Delaware Wing works in all three CAP missions: Cadet Programs, Aerospace Education, and Emergency Services. Most notably, Delaware Wing regularly assists DelDOT through the use of CAP planes, including Cessna 172 Skyhawks and Cessna 182 Skylanes. Delaware Wing has 5 corporate aircraft. For example, CAP aircraft monitor traffic during the Sprint Cup Series at Dover International Speedway in Dover, DE. In addition, CAP aircraft monitors daily traffic volume and reports to DelDOT road blockages from downed trees or a major accident, street and highway flooding, collapsed or washed-out bridges, and weekend beach traffic. By working closely with DelDOT, responders can be dispatched promptly and road crews can be summoned to block off accident sites while rerouting traffic if necessary.

== Delaware Wing Cadet Advisory Council ==
Delaware Wing Cadet Advisory Council (CAC) consists of 12 cadets from across Delaware Wing to promote and further cadet activities in Delaware. Each of the 6 cadet and composite squadrons in Delaware Wing elects one primary representative and one alternate representative to attend the monthly CAC meetings. In addition, the CAC representatives elect the Chair, Vice Chair, and Recorder, who heads the monthly meetings and writes the agenda and minutes. Also, the Delaware Wing CAC elects members to the Middle East Region Cadet Advisory Council. The CAC organizes the extremely popular Cadet Ball, held annually at Dover Air Force Base.

== Encampment and National Cadet Special Activities ==
Delaware Wing coordinates with Maryland Wing and the National Capital Wing to hold Tri-Wing Encampment every year. Delaware Wing is one of the few wings who does not have its own encampment due to its small population and area.

In addition, Delaware Wing cadets frequently attend National Cadet Special Activities, which gives cadets a diverse experience of military installations across America. Activities focus on career exploration, leadership development, search and rescue skills, aeronautical training, Air Force familiarization, government, and a variety of other topics.

== Squadrons in Delaware Wing ==
Delaware Wing has eight typical squadrons registered to the state. Four are located in New Castle County, two in Kent County, one in Sussex County, and one in Cecil County, Maryland. There is two composite squadrons, four cadet squadrons, and one senior squadron. There are also three non-standard squadrons (000, 001, and 999) under Delaware Wing Headquarters.

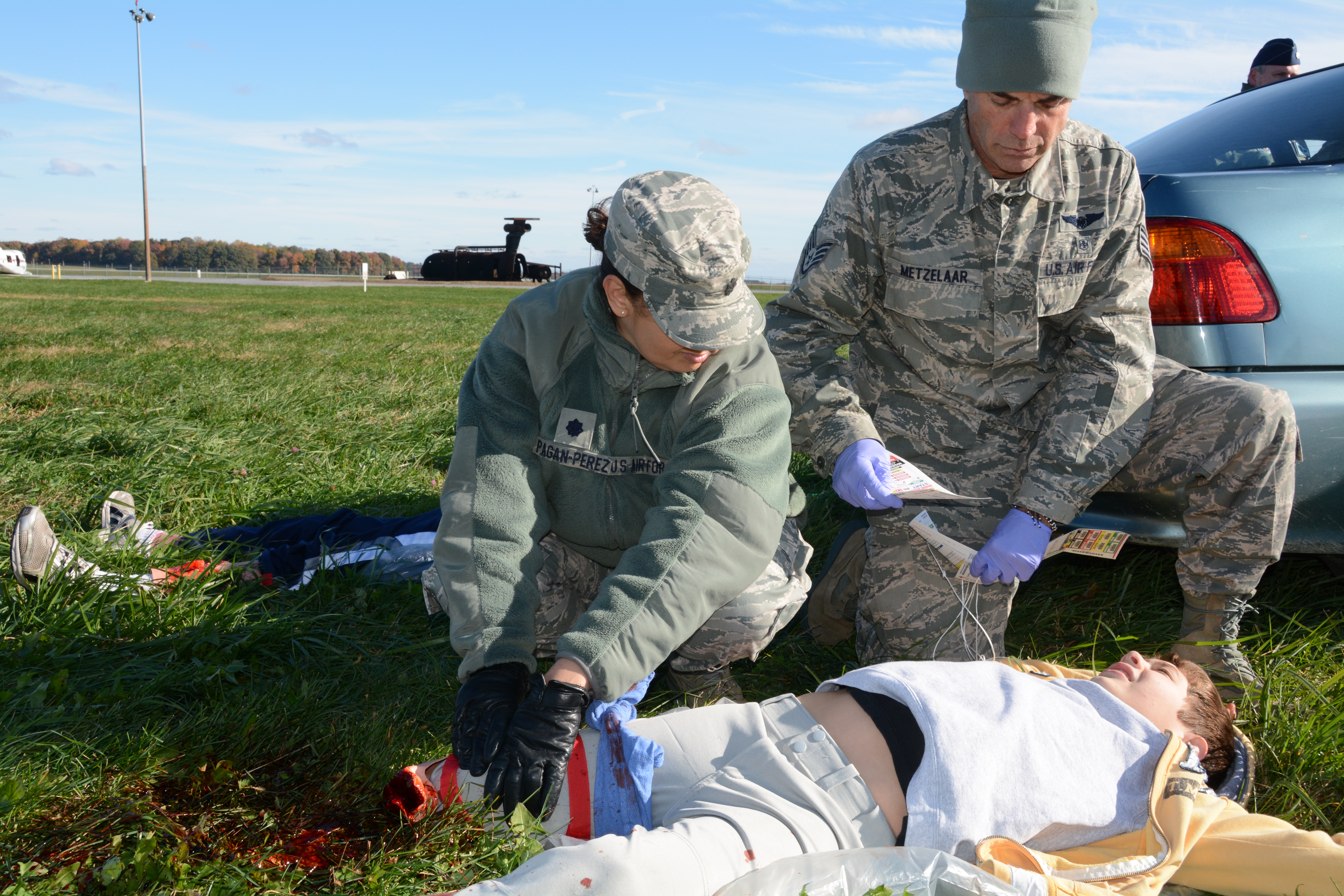
Lt. Col. Mildred Pagan-Perez (left) and Staff Sgt. Mark Metzelaar, 512th Aerospace Medicine Squadron, simulate first response treatment of a Delaware Civil Air Patrol cadet Sam Rundle during a training exercise.

=== Active Chartered Units ===
Squadron Name	Designation	Location	Website	Previous Names
Inactive	DE-000	No specific location		
Wing Headquarters	DE-001	Dover AFB, DE	Website	
Brandywine Cadet Squadron	DE-004	Wilmington, DE		
Dover Composite Squadron	DE-006	Dover, DE		Dover Senior Squadron
Delaware Air National Guard (DANG) Cadet Squadron	DE-008	Newark, DE		Bear-Glasgow Cadet Squadron, Newark Cadet Squadron
Coastal Patrol Base 2 Memorial Composite Squadron	DE-019	Georgetown, DE		Sussex Cadet Squadron
North Chesapeake Cadet Squadron	DE-020	Elkton, MD		
New Castle Senior Squadron	DE-022	New Castle, DE		
Middletown Cadet Squadron	DE-025	Middletown, DE		
Legislative Senior Squadron	DE-999	Dover, DE		

Inactive Chartered Units

Squadron Name	Designation	Remarks
New Castle Cadet Squadron	DE-011	Disbanded 2011 - Personnel merged with DE-008 in 2011
Eagle Cadet Squadron	DE-007	Located Dover AFB - Merged with DE-006 in 2021
Fred T Johnson Memorial Cadet Flight	DE-015	Located PAL Center 3707 N Mkt St, Wilmington - as of 2019
Milford Cadet Squadron	DE-017	Unknown.

== Past Wing commanders ==
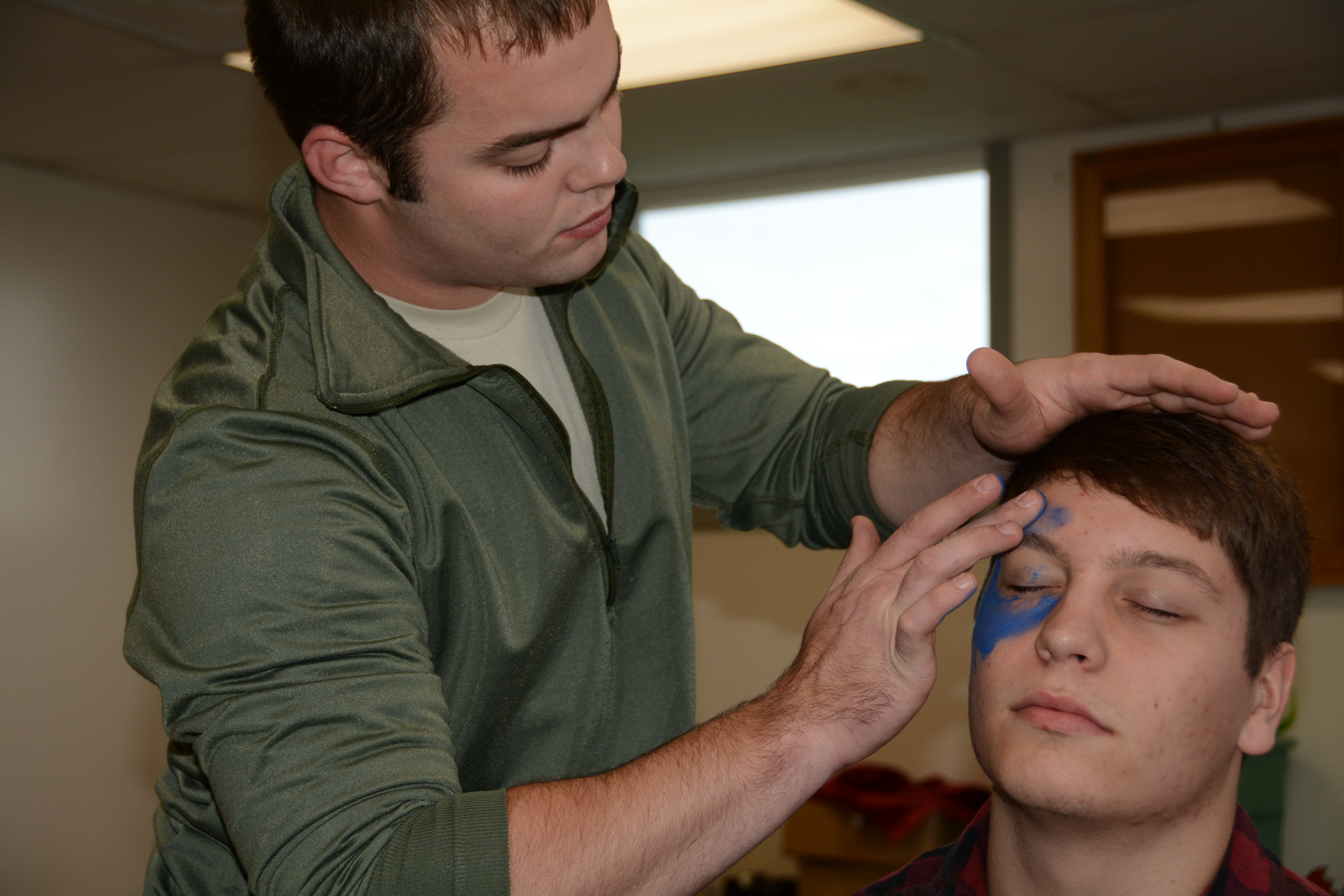
Senior Airman Greg Meyer applies makeup to a Delaware cadet in preparation for a mass casualty exercise.

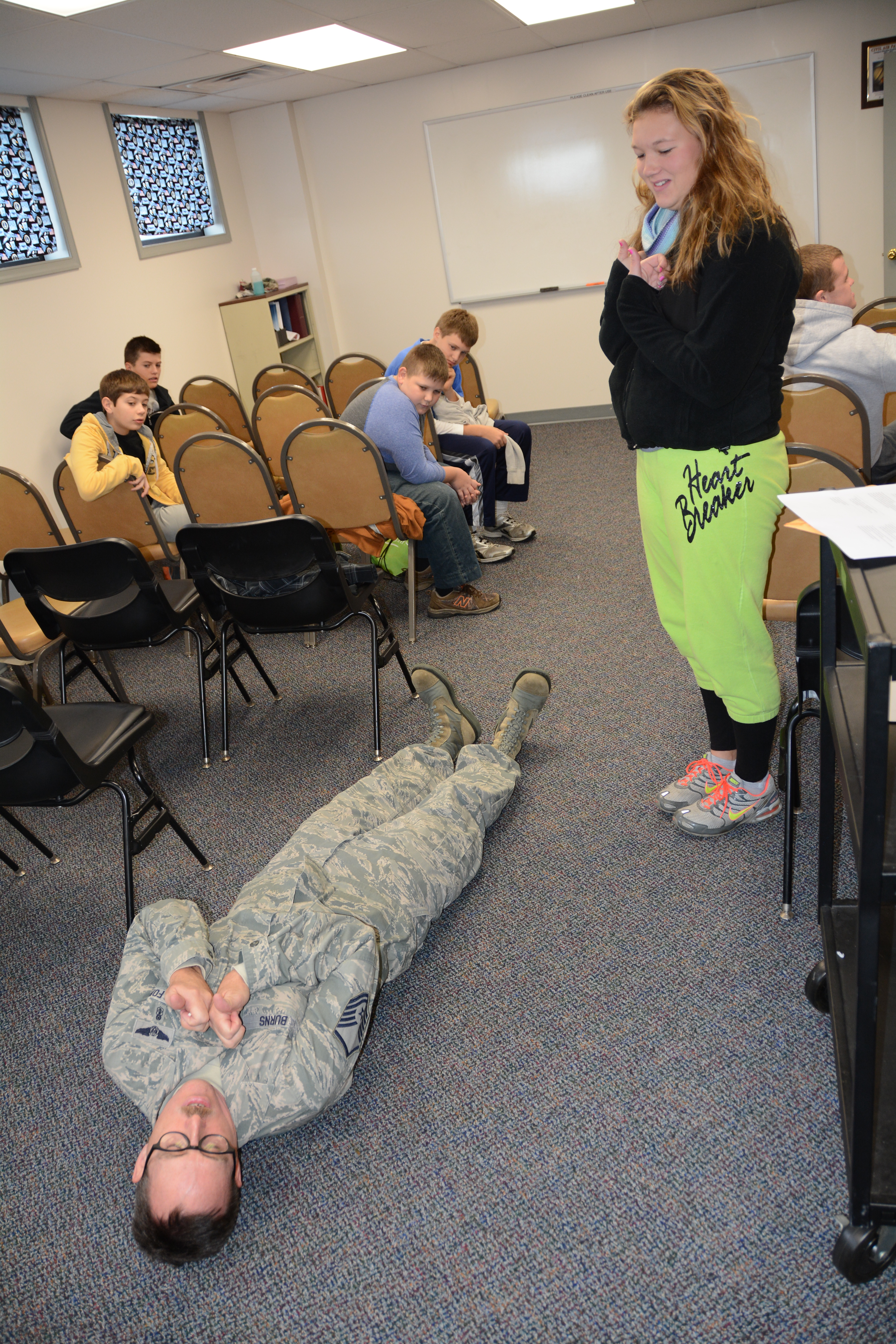
Master Sgt. Robert Burns demonstrates to a Delaware Wing CAP cadet how to play a victim during a mass casualty exercise.

Delaware Wing has had 22 Wing Commanders since the inception of Civil Air Patrol. A list of each commander and their years of service are listed below.

Commanders of the Delaware Wing
Commander's Name	Period of Service
Maj Holger Hoiriis	Dec 1941 - Aug 1942
Maj Herman S. Miller	Aug 1942 - Jun 1943
Maj Don Seevers	Jun 1943 - Oct 1944
Maj James P. Hanley	Oct 1944 - Dec 1944
Col William J. Simpson	Dec 1944 - Dec 1946
Col Walter A. Caskie	Dec 1946 - Mar 1951
Col Frank J. Lynch	Mar 1951 - Sep 1953
Col Louisa S. Morse	Sep 1953 - Jul 1976
Col William H. Everett	Jul 1976 - May 1977
Col Howard N. Pratt	May 1977 - Dec 1980
Col James W. Keener	Dec 1980 - Dec 1982
Col Herbert M. Wood	Dec 1982 - Dec 1984
Col Larry D. Tasker	Dec 1984 - Oct 1986
Col Herbert M. Wood	Oct 1986 - July 1989
Col David C. Driscall	July 1989 - Jan 1993
Col James H. Tazelaar	Jan 1993 - Jan 1997
Col Robert L. Vawter	Jan 1997 - Jan 2002
Col Raymond E. Harris	Jan 2002 - Aug 2003
Col Russell M. Opland	Aug 2003 - Sept 2007
Col Eugene L. Egry	Sept 2007 - Sept 2011
Col William S. Bernfeld	Sep 2011 - Jun 2014
Col Michael R. Moyer	Jun 2014 - June-2018
Col Robert Mooney	June 2018-June 2022
Col Robert A Hotchkiss Jr.	June 2022-June 2025

== Recognition and accomplishments ==
Overall, Delaware Wing has had 37 Spaatz cadets.

In 2006, Delaware Wing received a Unit Citation. In the fiscal year 2005, they had the highest number of hours flown per aircraft than any other wing in Civil Air Patrol by over 60%, a wide margin. In addition, they have earned one of the best compliance Inspection grades in the country over the past 5 years.

Delaware Wing's Lt Col John McGaha was featured in the Nov/Dec 2008 edition of CAP's Volunteer Magazine. He was named National Senior Member of the Year this past August. The story speaks of his lifelong dedication to the cadet program.

== See also ==
- Delaware Air National Guard
- Delaware State Guard
