= Maryland Wing Civil Air Patrol =

Echelon of the Civil Air Patrol in Maryland

- Maryland Wing of Civil Air Patrol

Associated branches
- United States Air Force

Command staff
- Commander: Col Brenda A. Reed
- Deputy Commander: Lt Col Robert F. Thompson
- Chief of Staff: Lt Col Eric W. Tiso

Current statistics
- Cadets: 1118
- Seniors: 754
- Total Membership: 1872
- Website: mdwg.cap.gov
- Statistics as of June 15, 2026

Maryland Wing, Civil Air Patrol (abbreviated MDWG) is the highest echelon of Civil Air Patrol in the U.S. state of Maryland. Its headquarters (HQ) is located in Granite, Maryland on the site of a former Nike Missile Base (BA-79). Granite is a tiny unincorporated community just northwest of Woodstock; the missile base and HQ have a listed mailing address of 3085 Hernwood Road Woodstock, MD. The Maryland Wing oversees 26 primary subordinate squadrons located throughout the state, including four school enrichment programs. The wing currently has a fleet of 11 aircraft made up of Cessna 172s and 182s. More than 1,800 members serve in Civil Air Patrol’s Maryland Wing.

== Mission ==
The Maryland Wing performs the three missions of Civil Air Patrol: providing emergency services; offering cadet programs for youth; and providing aerospace education for both CAP members and the general public.

=== Emergency services ===
Civil Air Patrol provides emergency services, which includes performing search and rescue and disaster relief missions; as well as assisting in humanitarian aid assignments. CAP also provides Air Force support through conducting light transport, communications support, and low-altitude route surveys. Civil Air Patrol can also offer support to counter-drug missions.

=== Cadet programs ===
Civil Air Patrol offers a cadet program for youth aged 12 to 20, which includes aerospace education, leadership training, physical fitness and moral leadership.

=== Aerospace education ===
Civil Air Patrol offers aerospace education for CAP members and the general public, including providing training to the members of CAP, and offering workshops for youth throughout the nation through schools and public aviation events.

== History ==
=== Two Maryland Wing aircrew members die in search of military jet ===
On 6 April 1954, at 1:05 p.m., Capt. Anthony J. Synodinos, CAP, and Chaplain (1st Lt.) Edward G. Conrad, CAP, died when their open-cockpit Ryan PT-22 airplane crashed into the water near Havre de Grace, MD. The two men, both members of the East Baltimore Squadron, were conducting a search and rescue mission for a missing T-33 military jet that was reported as missing and was never found. The search area was long, stretching from Long Island, N.Y., to Langley Field (now Joint Base Langley-Eustis), VA. Synodinos, serving as mission pilot, and Conrad, mission observer, had been searching the upper Chesapeake Bay in heavy fog.

In 1960, Maryland Wing dedicated a plaque in Havre de Grace, MD; to memorialize these two Civil Air Patrol members who died in service to their country.

On 3 April 2004, the Harford Composite Squadron relocated the marker and established a new plaque which commemorated the 50th anniversary of their deaths. Commanded by Lt. Col. Gerard W. Weiss, the Harford squadron held a ceremony installing the new plaque at the War Memorial in Millard Tydings Memorial Park near Commerce Street at S. Washington Street in Havre de Grace, MD. (39° 32.308′ N, 76° 5.372′ W).

The plaque reads:

In memory of Capt. Anthony J. Synodinos, CAP Chaplain (1 Lt.) Edward G. Conrad, CAP

They died April 6, 1954, in an airplane crash off this point while performing a search and rescue mission. Service like theirs with thoughts more for others than themselves will lead to a far better world to live in.

Original plaque dedicated by the Maryland Wing, Civil Air Patrol, 1960

New plaque dedicated by Harford Composite Squadron, Civil Air Patrol, United States Air Force Auxiliary.

=== Buzz One Four – B-52 Bomber Crash – 13 January 1964 ===
A B-52D Stratofortress, from the 484th Bomb Wing, carrying nuclear weapons with its five-man crew crashed near Lonaconing, Md., near the Appalachian Mountains of Western Maryland. The aircraft left Westover Air Force Base, Massachusetts on its way to Turner Air Force base in Albany, Georgia, but disappeared from contact. It was determined the B-52 crashed due to a blizzard resulting from two storm fronts converging while flying over Maryland. During the turbulence created by the fronts, the aircraft’s vertical tail fin snapped off the plane, hitting the left horizontal stabilizer and tail gunner’s pod. This resulted in the aircraft rolling onto its back and descending into a spin.

Civil Air Patrol was alerted and Maryland Wing aircrews spotted the B-52's co-pilot, who had ejected, Capt. Parker Peedin, about two miles from Grantsville, MD; and directed ground teams to rescue. The pilot, Maj. Tom McCormick, also ejected and, after walking nearly two miles, was located and transported to Cumberland for medical treatment. Sgt. Mel Wooten, tail gunner, who was riding up front; not in the tail, ejected, but was injured by parts of the aircraft and landed near the Casselman River near Salisbury, Pennsylvania. Unfortunately he did not survive. Maj. Robert Payne, navigator, parachuted from the aircraft but fell into a partially frozen stream where his body was found by rescuers. The fifth crew member, Bombardier Robert Townley, died in the plane.

Maryland State Police took command of the area due to the two, 24-megaton nuclear bombs the aircraft was carrying. The bombs were recovered and taken to Cumberland Municipal Airport for transport.

Memorials have been erected in memory of the crew members. A large memorial can be seen along U.S. Route 40, about a mile east of Grantsville, MD. The Grantsville Community Museum has artifacts on display from the crash.

== Squadrons ==
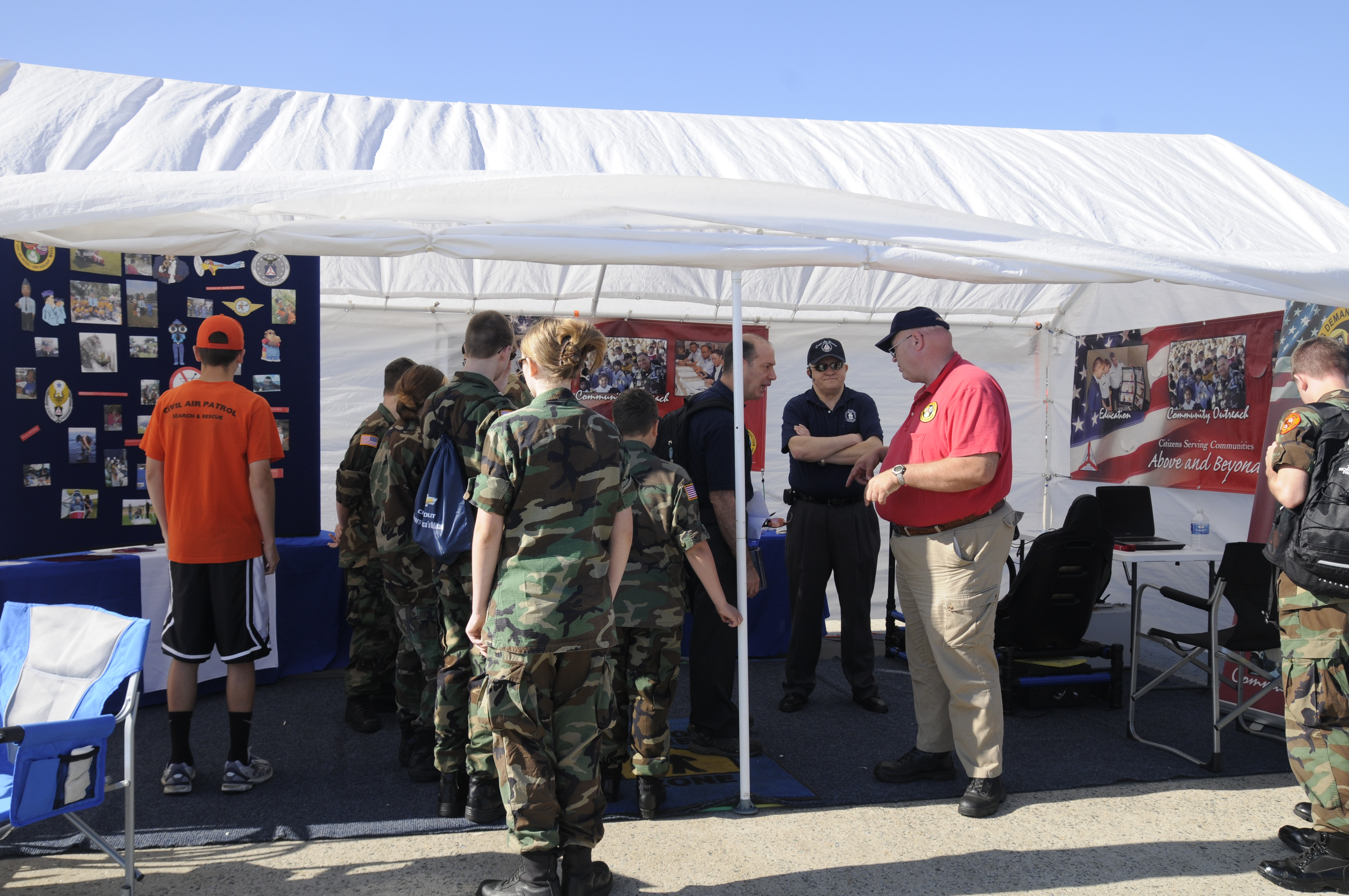
Retired Air Force Lt Col John Mariakis and Maj Walter Murphy speak with Civil Air Patrol cadets at the Joint Service Open House, Andrews Air Force Base.

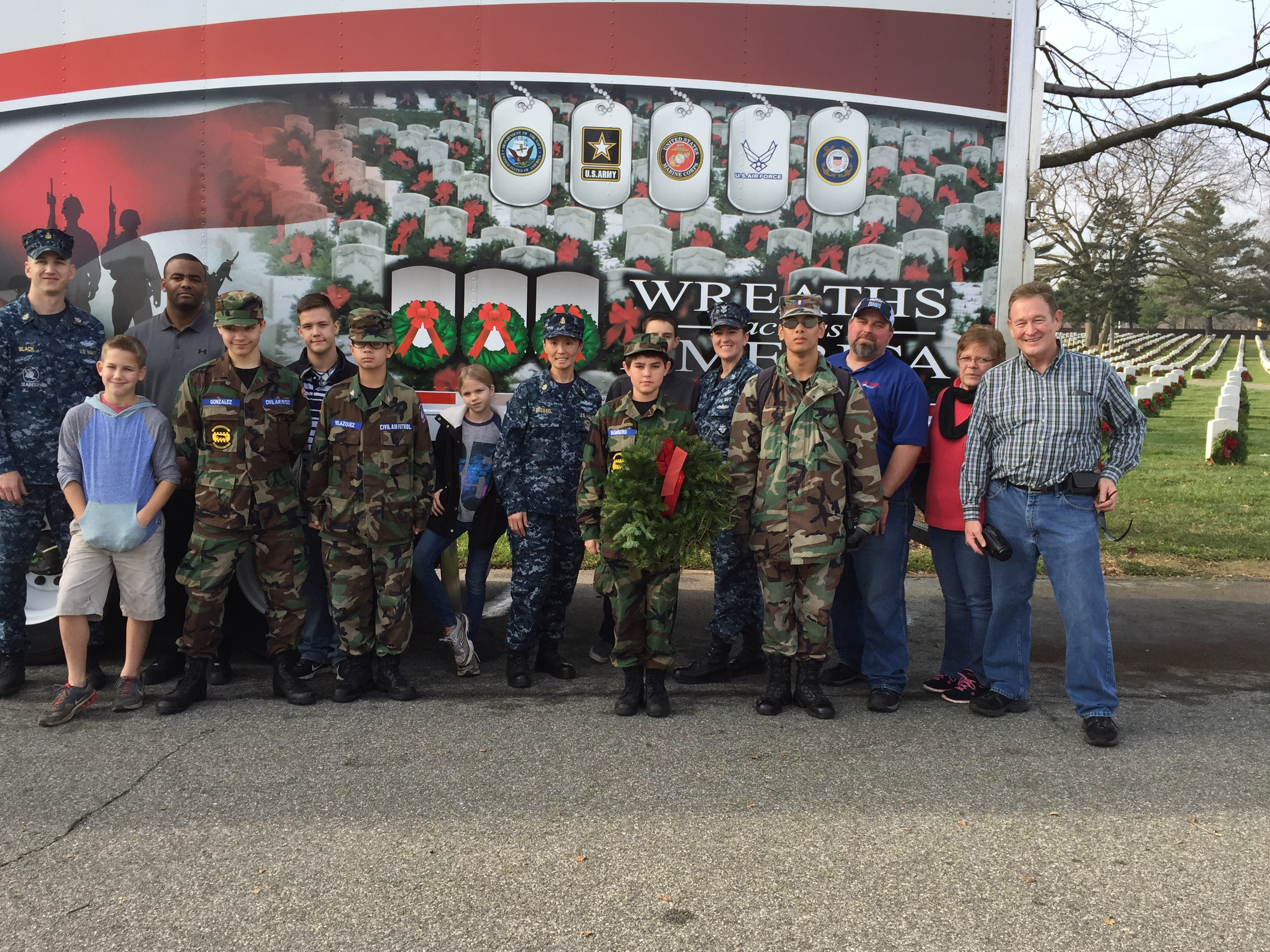
CAP members assist Wreaths Across America and the public to decorate National Cemeteries during the holidays.

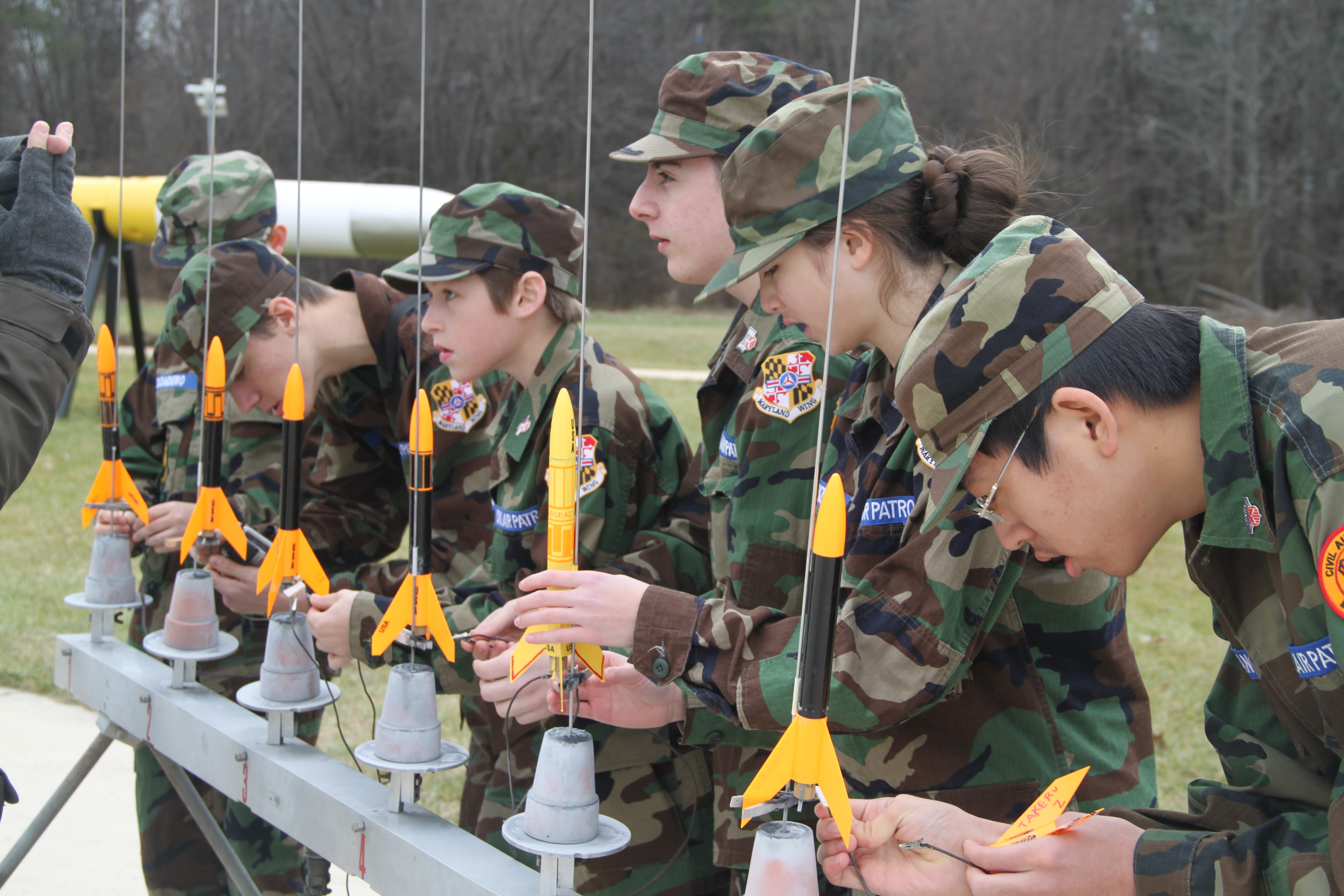
Upper Montgomery County Composite Squadron Cadets from Germantown launch their model rockets at NASA Goddard in Greenbelt – February 2016

Squadrons of the Maryland Wing
| Group | Designation | Squadron name | Location | Awards |
|---|---|---|---|---|
| — | MD-001 | Maryland Wing Headquarters Squadron | Granite, Maryland Granite | |
| — | MD-308 | Maryland Wing Howard County Squadron | Howard County, Maryland | |
| — | MD-999 | Maryland Legislative Squadron | Annapolis | |
| 1 | MD-038 | Howard Composite Squadron | Laurel | |
| 1 | MD-071 | Bethesda–Chevy Chase Composite Squadron | Gaithersburg | 2012 CAP Squadron of Distinction Award; Group 1 Squadron of the Year 2015, 2011, 2009, 2008, 2007, 2006; MDWG Squadron of the Year 2015, 2011, 2008, 2007, 2006, 2000; MDWG Squadron of Merit 2010, 2007; MER Squadron of Distinction 2007, 2012 |
| 1 | MD-073 | Montgomery Senior Squadron | Gaithersburg | Unit Citation Award |
| 1 | MD-332 | Upper Montgomery Composite Squadron | Germantown | |
| 1 | MD-801 | Parkland Middle School Cadet Squadron | Rockville | |
| 2 | MD-008 | Harford Composite Squadron | Bel Air | Group 2 Squadron of the Year 2019, 2016, 2007; MDWG Squadron of the Year 2019 |
| 2 | MD-013 | Towson Composite Squadron | Towson | |
| 2 | MD-023 | Arundel Composite Squadron | Glen Burnie | 1994 CAP Squadron of Distinction Award; Group 3 Squadron of the Year 2018, 2017; MDWG Squadron of Merit 2019 |
| 2 | MD-031 | Glenn L. Martin Composite Squadron | Middle River | Unit Citation Award Group 2 Squadron of the Year 2018, 2015, 2011 |
| 2 | MD-879 | Granite Cadet Squadron | Granite | 2024 CAP Squadron of Distinction Award; MAR Squadron of Distinction 2024; MDWG Squadron of Merit 2023; MDWG Squadron of the Year 2023; Group 1 Squadron of the Year 2023 |
| 3 | MD-007 | Calvert Cadet Squadron | Prince Frederick | Group 3 Squadron of the Year 2022, 2014, 2010; MDWG Squadron of the Year 2014, 2022; MDWG Squadron of Merit 2015 |
| 3 | MD-019 | Charles Composite Squadron | Indian Head | |
| 3 | MD-011 | College Park Composite Squadron | College Park | Unit Citation Award Group 3 Squadron of the Year 2007 |
| 3 | MD-089 | St. Mary's Composite Squadron | California | Unit Citation Award Group 3 Squadron of the Year 2020, 2019, 2013, 2011, 2006; MDWG Squadron of the Year 1982, 1984, 1989, 1995, 1996, 2006, 2012, 2013, 2020; MDWG Squadron of Merit 2001, 2003, 2005 |
| 3 | MD-890 | Esperanza Middle School Flight | Lexington Park | |
| 4 | MD-003 | Frederick Composite Squadron | Frederick | Unit Citation Award Group 1 Squadron of the Year 2016, 2014, 2013 |
| 4 | MD-004 | Hagerstown Composite Squadron | Hagerstown | MDWG Squadron of Merit 2004, 2002 |
| 4 | MD-039 | Carroll Composite Squadron | Westminster | Unit Citation Award Group 2 Squadron of the Year 2013, 2010, 2008, 2004; MDWG Squadron of the Year 2010, 2004; MDWG Squadron of Merit 2006; MER Squadron of Distinction 2006 |
| 4 | MD-065 | Cumberland Composite Squadron | Wiley Ford, WV | Unit Citation Award Group 1 Squadron of the Year 2019, 2017, 2018; MDWG Squadron of the Year 2017, 2018; MDWG Squadron of Merit 2018; MER Squadron of Distinction 2018 |
| 4 | MD-091 | Mount Airy Composite Squadron | Mount Airy | Unit Citation Award MDWG Squadron of Merit 2008, 1998 Group 1 Squadron of the Year 2020, 2021, 2022; Group 4 Squadron of the Year 2024; MDWG Squadron of the Year 2024 |
| 5 | MD-028 | Col. Mary S. Feik Composite Squadron (formerly Annapolis Composite Squadron) | Edgewater | Group 3 Squadron of the Year 2016, 2015; MDWG Squadron of the Year 2016, 2015; MDWG Squadron of Merit 2016; MER Squadron of Distinction 2016 |
| 5 | MD-052 | Bowie Composite Squadron | Bowie | Group 3 Squadron of the Year 2009, 2008; MDWG Squadron of the Year 2009; MDWG Squadron of Merit 2009 |
| 5 | MD-079 | Easton Composite Squadron | Easton | MDWG Squadron of Merit 2017 |
| 5 | MD-085 | Apollo 1 Senior Squadron | Fort Meade | |
| 5 | MD-086 | Wicomico Composite Squadron | Salisbury | Group 2 Squadron of the Year 2014; MDWG Squadron of the Year 2005; MDWG Squadron of Merit 2013, 2006; MER Squadron of Distinction 2013 |

== Disbanded squadrons ==
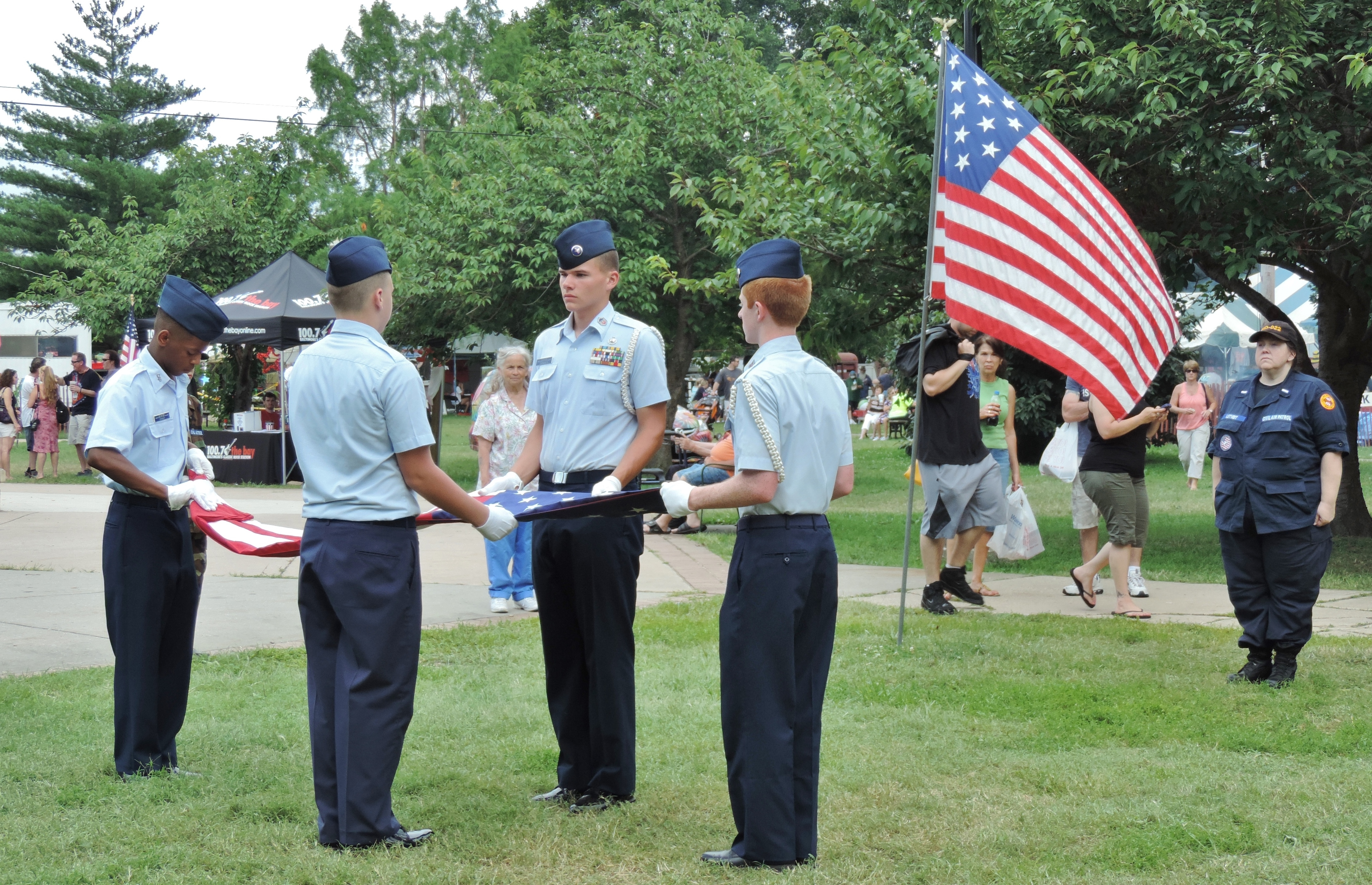
Cadets of the Maryland Wing, Civil Air Patrol fold the American flag.

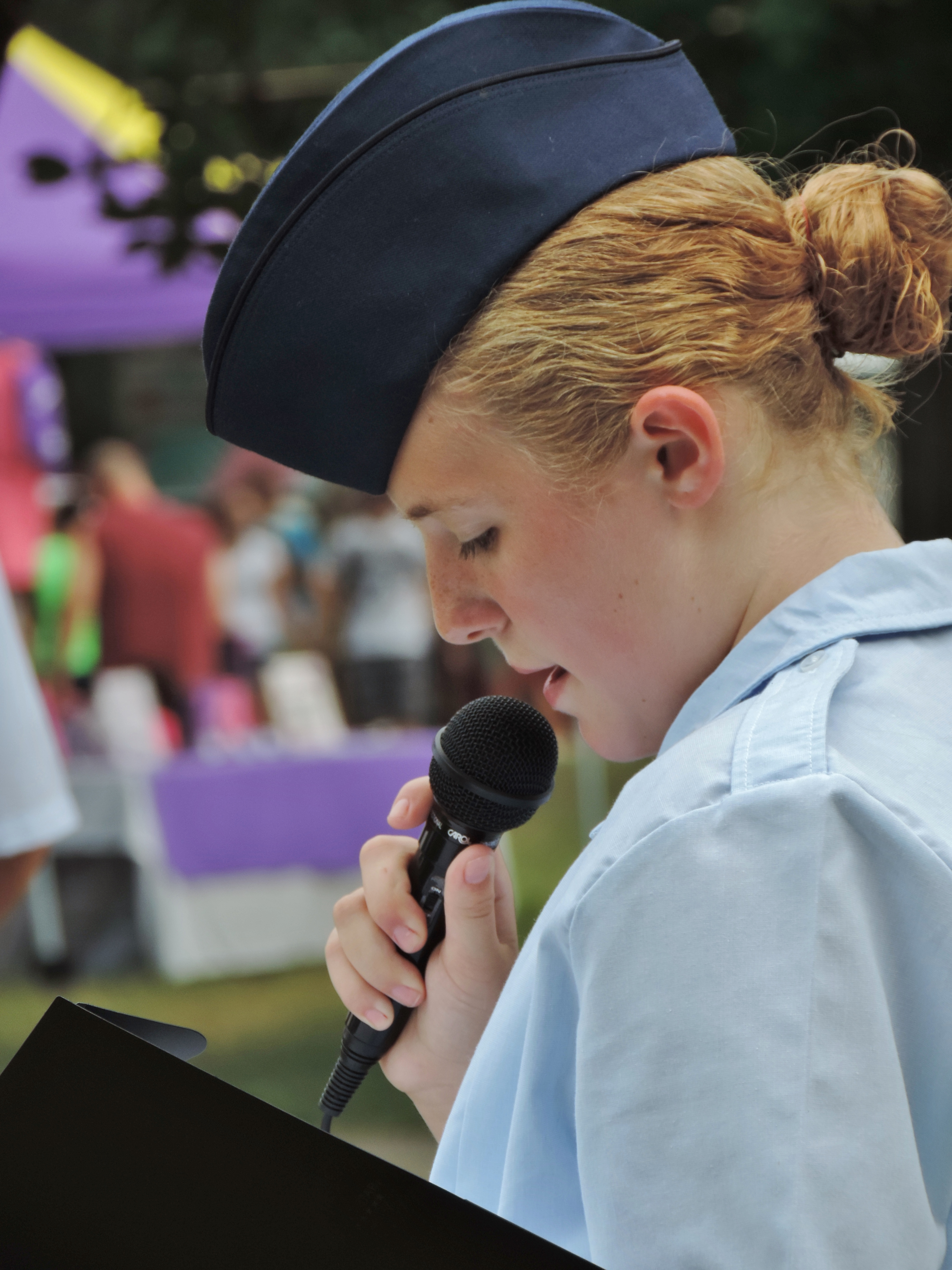
A CAP cadet speaking at the 2013 Dundak Heritage Fair

Former squadrons of the Maryland Wing
| Charter number | Squadron name | Location |
|---|---|---|
| 18002 | Naval Academy Senior Squadron | Annapolis |
| 18002 | Hyde Field Senior Squadron | Clinton |
| 18006 | Chesapeake Bay Cadet Squadron | |
| 18007 | Foxwell Composite Squadron | Pikesville |
| 18010 | Fred V. Cherry Composite Squadron | Baltimore |
| 18012 | Great Falls Cadet Sq | Tysons Corner, VA |
| 18014 | Harford | |
| 18014 | White Marsh Composite Squadron | Perry Hall |
| 18018 | Catonsville Composite Squadron | Catonsville |
| 18021 | Middle River Composite Squadron | Essex |
| 18021 | Chesapeake | |
| 18023 | Phoenix Composite Squadron | Jacksonville |
| 18023 | Glen Burnie Composite Squadron | Glen Burnie |
| 18025 | Eastern Baltimore Squadron | |
| 18026 | Gunpowder Composite Squadron | Fork |
| 18030 | Gray Manor Composite Sq | Dundalk |
| 18031 | Group I | |
| 18044 | Gwynn Oak | |
| 18044 | Northwest Composite Squadron | Randallstown |
| 18045 | Odenton Cadet Squadron | Odenton |
| 18049 | Lanham Composite Squadron | Lanham |
| 18053 | Deale Senior Squadron | Deale |
| 18054 | Suburban | |
| 18066 | Westside | |
| 18069 | Linthicum Cadet Squadron | Linthicum |
| 18072 | Rosedale Composite Squadron | Rosedale |
| 18075 | Peninsular Composite Squadron | Severna Park |
| 18077 | Reisterstown Composite Squadron | Reisterstown |
| 18078 | Queen Anne's County Squadron | Centreville |
| 18084 | Calvert County | |
| 18086 | General Foulois | |
| 18087 | 223rd Cadet Sq | |
| 18088 | Salisbury Composite Squadron | Salisbury |
| 18088 | Wicomico County | |
| 18090 | Star-Trac | |
| 18090 | Indian Head Composite Squadron | Indian Head |
| 18091 | Tolchester Composite Squadron | Chestertown |
| 18092 | Blackhawk | |
| 18092 | Francis M. Wood Cadet Squadron | Baltimore |
| 18092 | Southwestern | |
| 18093 | Patterson Park | |
| 18094 | Group 5 | |
| 18095 | Emmitsburg-Liberty Composite Sq | Emmitsburg |
| 18105 | Group V | |
| 18141 | Chesapeake Bay Senior Squadron | |
| MD-022 | Osprey | |
| MD-092 | Southwestern | |
| MD-096 | Chesapeake Bay Senior Squadron | Bethesda |
| MD-140 | Fort McHenry Composite Squadron | Catonsville |
| MD-800 | Southwestern | |
| MD-802 | Spring Ridge | Lexington Park |
| MD-808 | The SEED School of Maryland Cadet Squadron | Baltimore |
| | Chesapeake Composite Squadron | Baltimore |
| | Peoria Cadet Squadron | |
| | Waldorf | Waldorf |

== Past Wing commanders ==
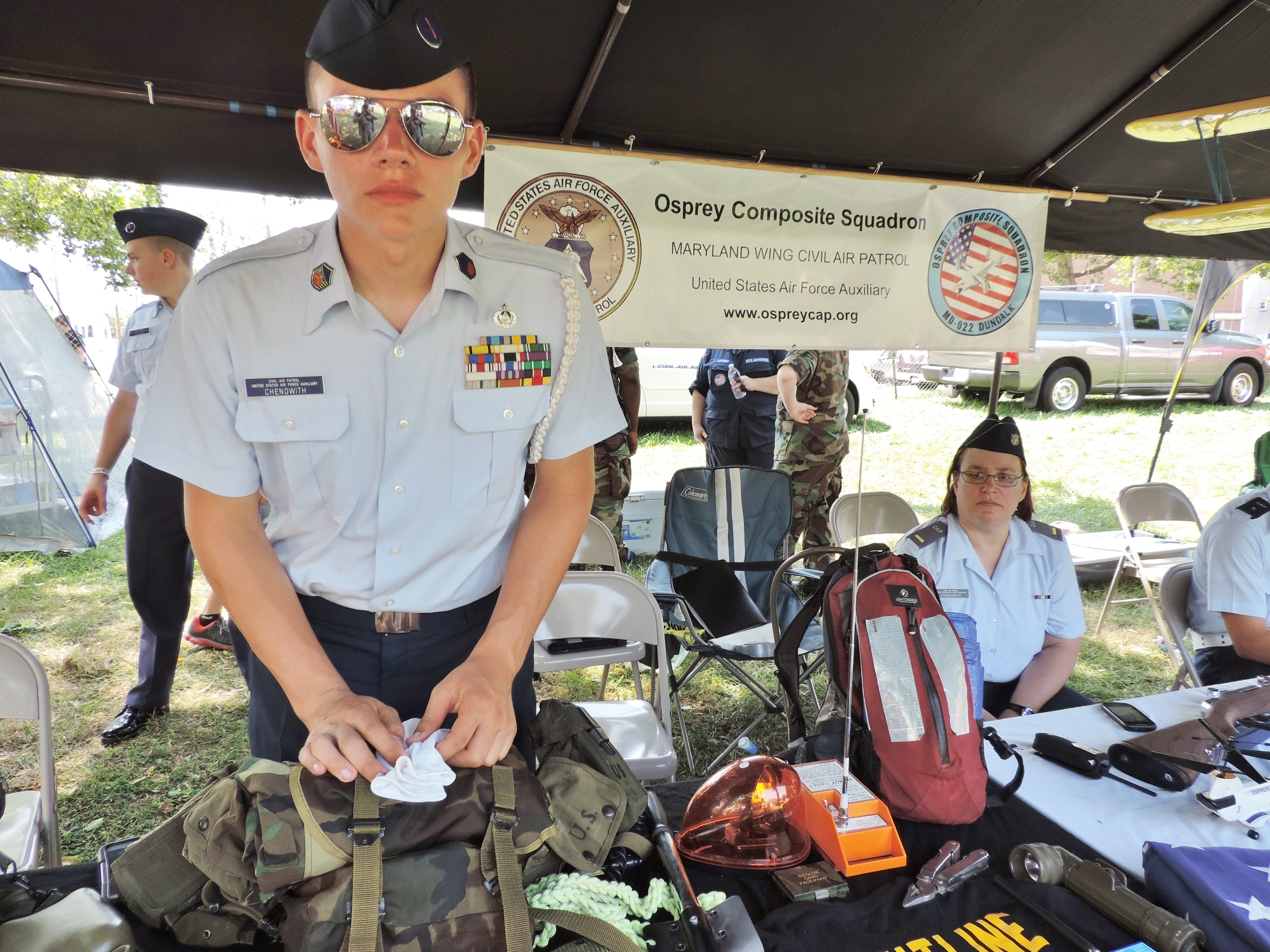
Cadets from the Osprey Composite Squadron work a recruiting booth.

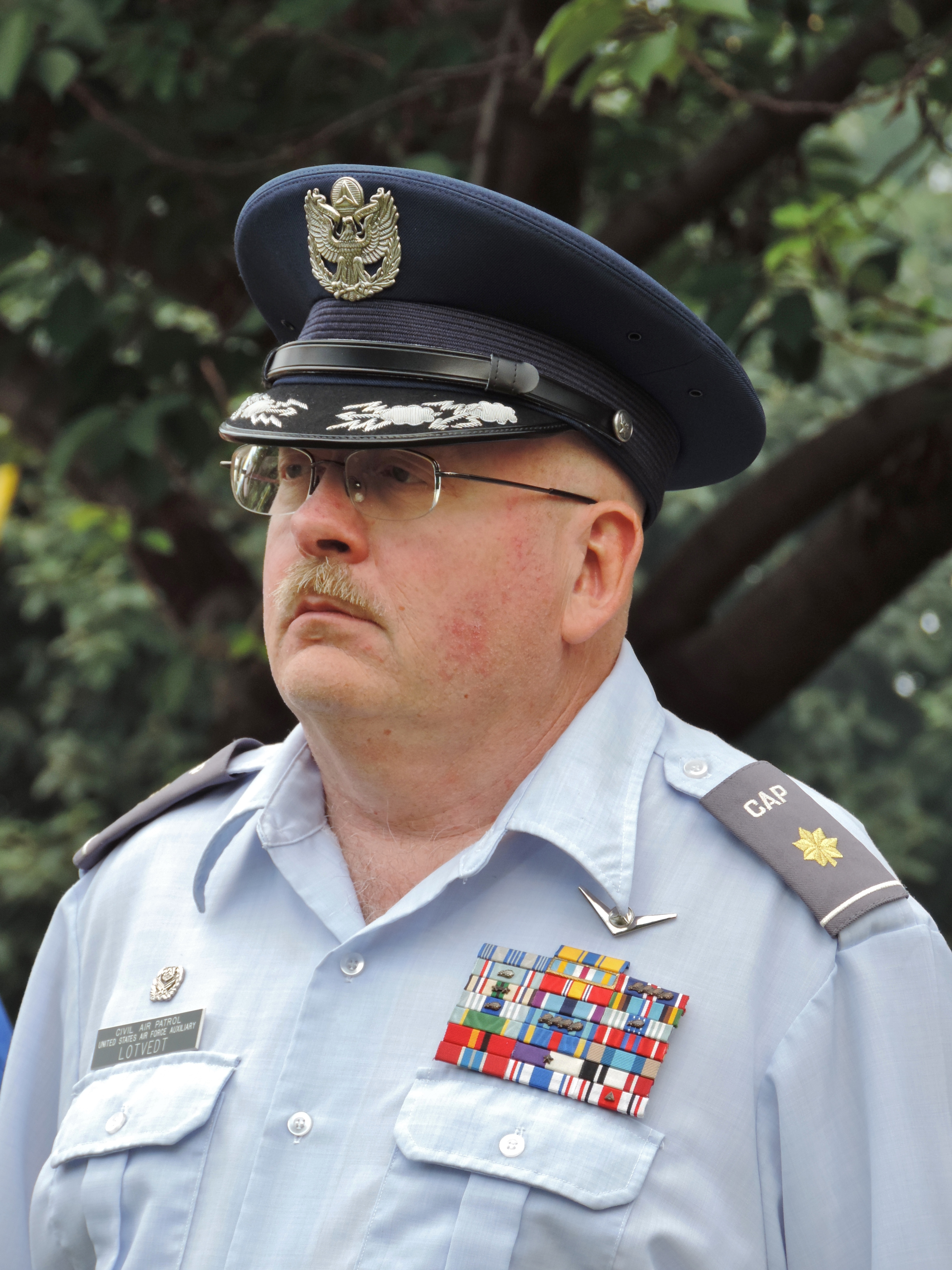
An officer from Civil Air Patrol's Maryland Wing

Commanders of the Maryland Wing
| Commander's name | Period of service |
|---|---|
| Lt Col Arthur C. Hyde | 1941–1945 |
| Lt Col Edward R. Fenimore | 1945–1948 |
| Col Allan U. Bevier | 1948–1951 |
| Col Bennett Crain | 1951–1954 |
| Col A. Paul Fonda | 1954–1958 |
| Col William D. Turner | 1958–1959 |
| Col Willard D. Gilbert | 1959 (Acting) 1968–1971 (Official) |
| Col Eugene S. Bibb | 1959–1960 (Acting) |
| Col William M. Patterson* | 1960–1969 |
| Col Stanley F. Moyer | 1971–1976 |
| Col Frank A. Kunkowski | 1976–1980 |
| Col Daniel J. Hill | 1980–1984 |
| Col Kenneth R. Welk | 1984–1988 |
| Col Clifford A. Parks | 1988–1992 |
| Col Eugene L. Przybylowicz | 1992–1996 |
| Col Ralph A. Vogt | 1996–2000 |
| Col Lawrence L. Trick | 2000–2004 |
| Col Kay Joslin Walling | 2004–2006 |
| Lt Col John C. Kilgallon | 2006 (Acting) |
| Col Gerard W. Weiss | 2006–2010 |
| Col John M. Knowles | 2010–2014 |
| Col William Parris (deceased) | 2014–2016 |
| Col Joe Winter | 2016–2020 |
| Col Wes LaPre | 2020–2024 |
*Patterson was later promoted to Brigadier General when he became chairman of the National Board in 1973. In 1975, Patterson became the first CAP member to hold the title of "National Commander".

== Mary Feik Achievement ==
Mary Feik ribbon

The Mary Feik Achievement is awarded for successfully completing the requirements associated with Achievement 3 in Phase I of the Civil Air Patrol cadet program; it includes promotion to the grade of Cadet Senior Airman. Mary Feik, who was an active member of the Annapolis Composite Squadron, resided in Annapolis, Maryland, until her death in June 2016. Col. Feik was known for giving an aerospace education related presentation at the annual Tri-Wing Encampment sponsored by Maryland Wing, Delaware Wing, and the National Capital Wing.

== Spaatz Award Achievement ==
Carl A. Spaatz ribbon

The General Carl A. Spaatz Award is the highest award in the Civil Air Patrol cadet program. The award honors General Carl A. Spaatz, who was the first Chief of Staff of the United States Air Force and the second National Commander of Civil Air Patrol.

First awarded in 1964, only 0.5% of CAP cadets ever earn the Spaatz award. Maryland ranks 9th among the 50 U.S. states in the number of Spaatz awards earned (1st – Florida; 2nd – California; 3rd – New York; 4th – Texas; 5th – Illinois; 6th – Pennsylvania; 7th – North Carolina; 8th – Virginia). Award recipients from Maryland include:

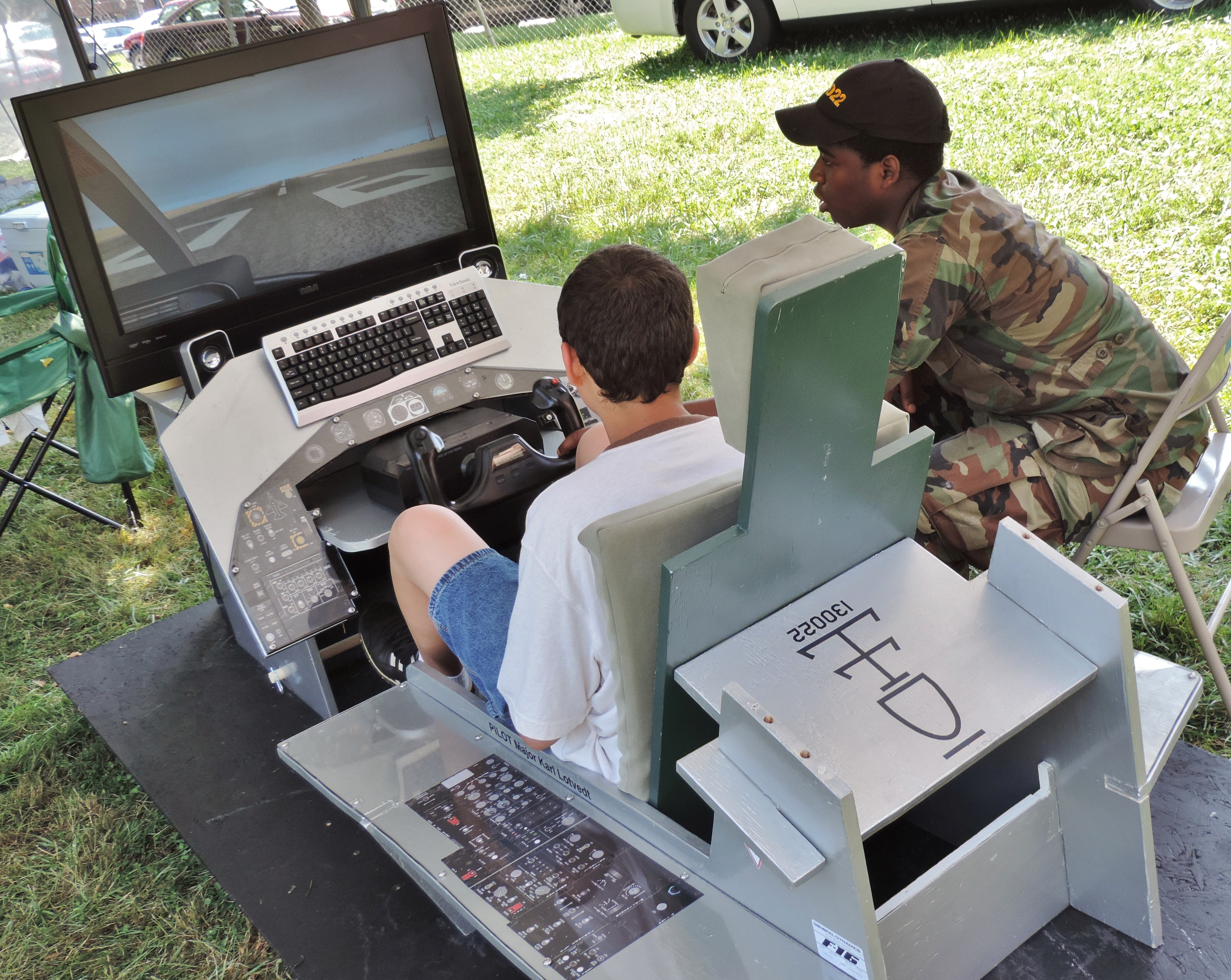
A member of the public uses a flight simulator while supervised by a CAP cadet.

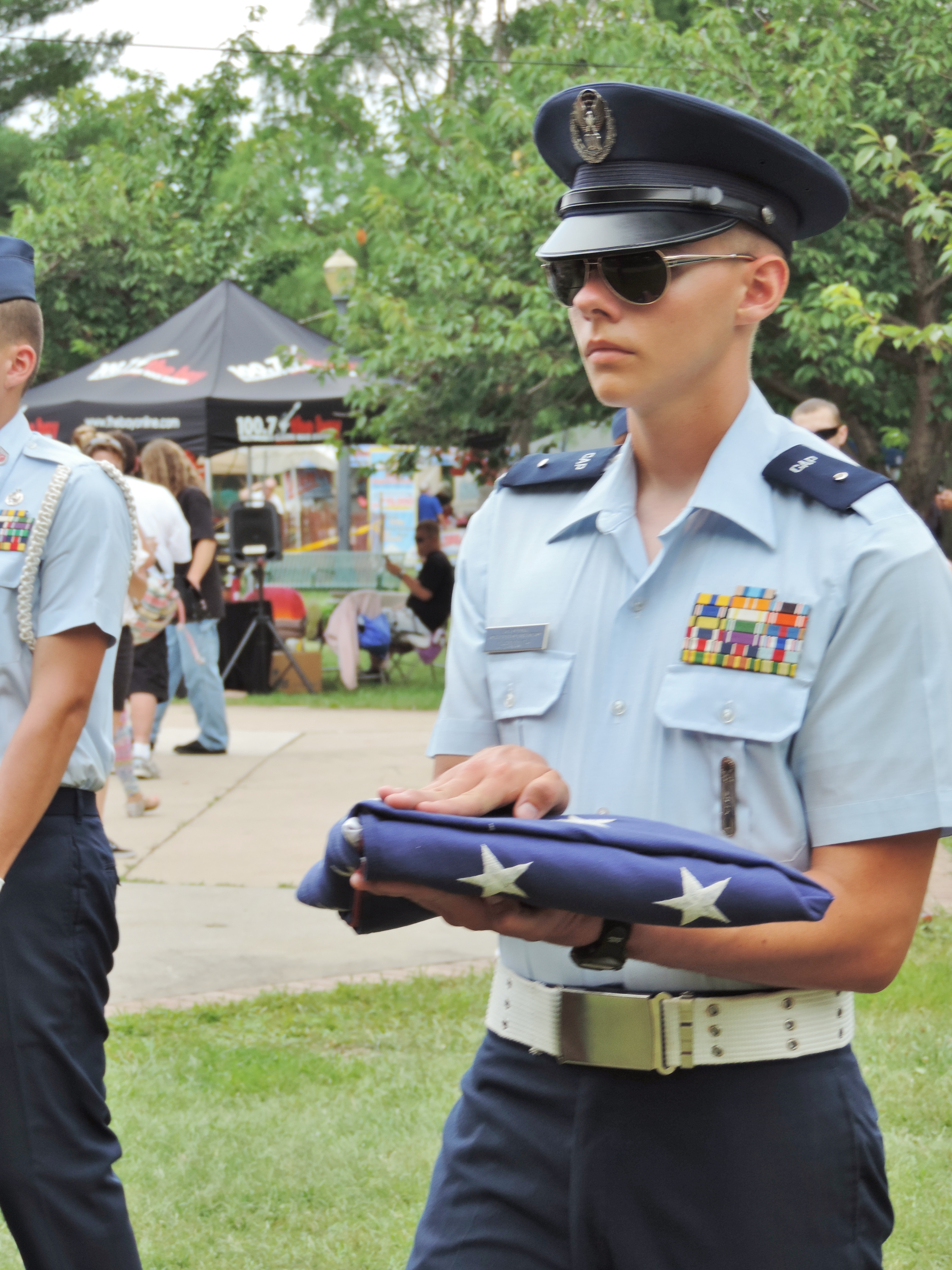
A Maryland Wing cadet holds the American flag during a ceremony.

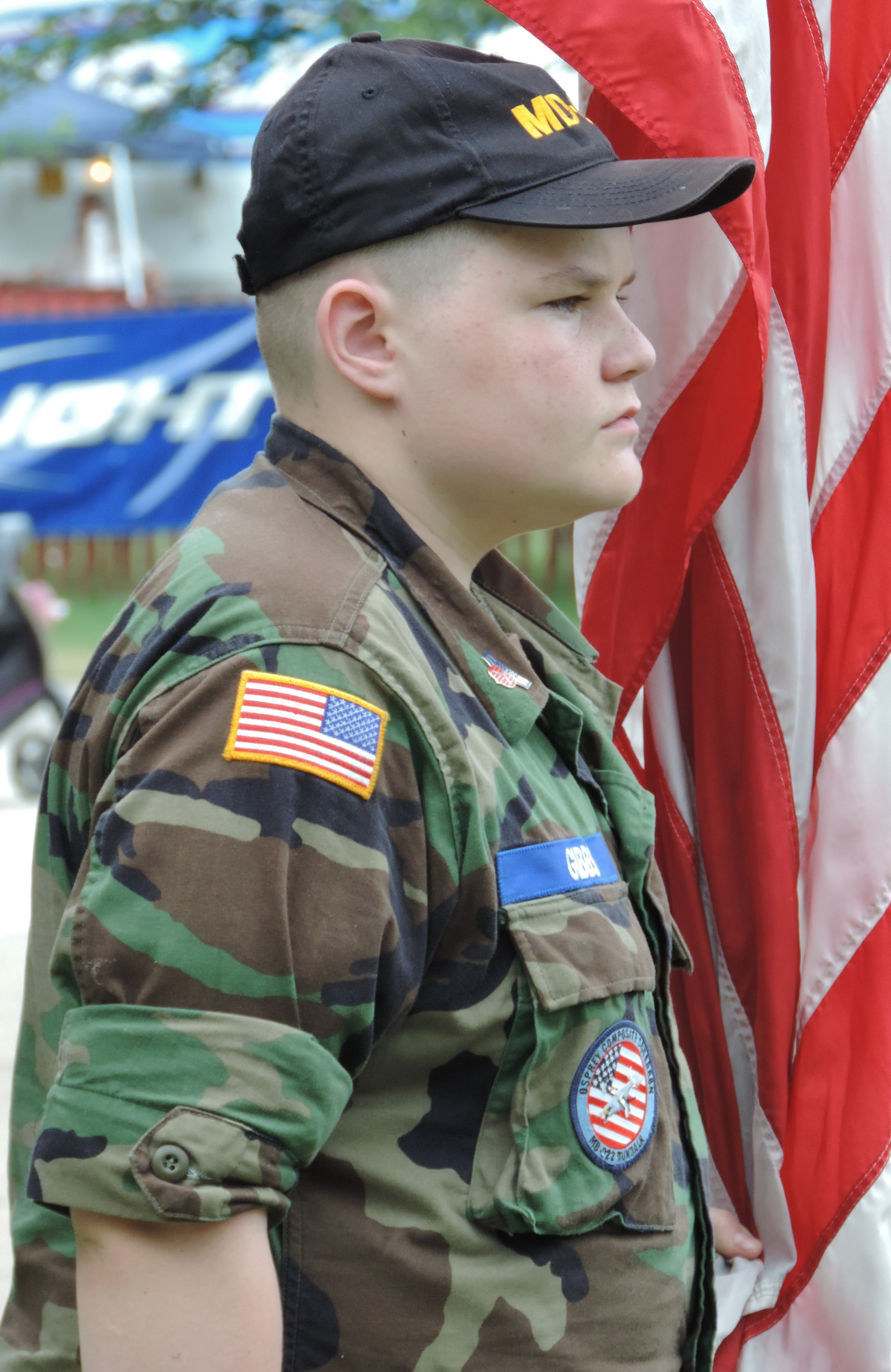
A Maryland Wing cadet at the 2013 Dundalk Heritage Fair

Spaatz Awardees of the Maryland Wing
| Award # | Recipient | Award date | Unit |
|---|---|---|---|
| 85 | Linda L. Osterhoudt | 18-Feb-69 | Lanham Composite Squadron (18049) |
| 95 | Lloyd Moroughan | 21-Oct-69 | Lanham Composite Squadron (18049) |
| 172 | Raymond T. Hawkins | 11-Jul-72 | Frederick Composite Squadron (18003) |
| 206 | James F. Babbitt | 15-Mar-73 | Prince George's Comp. Sq. (18011) |
| 207 | Anne M. Skebirdis | 21-Mar-73 | Catonsville Composite Sq. (18018) |
| 209 | Ronald P. Ward | 3-Mar-73 | Catonsville Composite Sq. (18018) |
| 231 | Howard F. Eisingor | 2-Aug-73 | Bethesda-Chevy Chase Cadet Sq. (18071) |
| 281 | Kevin A. Parks | 29-Jul-74 | Towson Composite Sq. (18013) |
| 337 | Randy W. Hosselrode | 22-Aug-75 | Cumberland Composite Sq. (18065) |
| 352 | Michael L. Smith | 17-Sep-75 | Middle River Composite Sq. (18021) |
| 355 | Mark P. Hetterly | 2-Oct-75 | Bethesda-Chevy Chase Cadet Sq. (18071) |
| 411 | William Trail | 16-Nov-76 | Apollo I Composite Sq. (18085) |
| 569 | Mark A. Kukucka | 6-Apr-81 | Gunpowder Composite Squadron (18026) |
| 646 | Cindy T. Shanabrook | 3-Jun-83 | Linthcum Composite Sq. (18069) |
| 721 | John C. Kilgallon | 2-Nov-84 | Howard Composite Sq. (18038) |
| 722 | Kevin Redman | 2-Nov-84 | Howard Composite Sq. (18038) |
| 730 | Martin Strittmatter | 11-Jan-85 | Linthcum Composite Sq. (18069) |
| 739 | Francis W. Moran | 13-Mar-85 | Prince Georges Composite Sq. (18011) |
| 858 | Todd Shelton | 3-Sep-87 | Glenn L. Martin Composite Sq. (18031) |
| 861 | Curt A. Klun | 3-Oct-87 | Bethesda-Chevy Chase Comp. Sq. (18071) |
| 968 | Kevin B. Cooley | 8-Dec-89 | St. Mary's Composite Sq. (18089) |
| 1021 | Tina Lumley | 16-Aug-90 | Whitemarsh Composite Sq. (18014) |
| 1023 | Michael Britten | 21-Aug-90 | Apollo I Composite Sq. (18085) |
| 1025 | Wesley Comerer | 27-Aug-90 | Howard Composite Sq. (18038) |
| 1031 | Richard Benet | 2-Sep-90 | Frederick Composite Sq. (18003) |
| 1040 | Thomas Single | 1-Jan-91 | Harford Composite Squadron (18008) |
| 1155 | Charles R. Midkiff III | 26-Feb-93 | Prince George Composite Squadron (18011) |
| 1204 | Shawn Fry | 18-Mar-94 | Wicomico Composite Sq. (18086) |
| 1221 | Roxanne N. Landesman | 3-Aug-94 | Prince George Composite Squadron (18011) |
| 1271 | Tori K. Steinmeier | 5-Sep-95 | Towson Composite Sq. (18013) |
| 1291 | James A. Iacarino | 5-Mar-96 | White Marsh Composite Sq. (18014) |
| 1292 | Brian S. Coats | 23-Mar-96 | Glenn L. Martin Composite Sq. (18031) |
| 1293 | Matthew R. Heusser | 23-Mar-96 | Wicomico Composite Sq. (18086) |
| 1298 | Gabrielle E. Lutz | 28-Jun-96 | St. Mary's Composite Sq. (18089) |
| 1301 | Tammy J. Blevins | 1-Aug-96 | St. Mary's Composite Sq. (18089) |
| 1304 | Alisha M. Cope | 7-Aug-96 | Howard Composite Sq. (18038) |
| 1330 | James R. Logan | 7-Jul-97 | Indian Head Composite Sq. (18090) |
| 1460 | Aaron J. Kleiman | 22-May-02 | Wicomico Composite Sq. (MD-086) |
| 1463 | John F. Reutemann III | 10-Jul-02 | Bethesda-Chevy Chase Comp. Sq. (MD-071) |
| 1505 | Abraham H. Phares | 2-Jun-03 | Hagerstown Composite Sq. (MD-004) |
| 1562 | Emily K. Hudson | 18-Jun-05 | Arundel Composite Sq. (MD-023) |
| 1563 | Rachel L. Gibbs | 18-Jun-05 | Carroll Composite Sq. (MD-039) |
| 1586 | David Wainland | 31-Jan-06 | Howard Composite Sq. (MD-038) |
| 1598 | Jacob A. Reed | 8-Apr-06 | Carroll Composite Sq. (MD-039) |
| 1617 | Carl D. Bevard Jr. | 24-Oct-06 | Prince Frederick Composite Sq. (MD-007) |
| 1621 | Grace M. Stapf | 18-Dec-06 | Mount Airy Composite Sq. (MD-091) |
| 1653 | Joanna S. Weiss | 9-Jul-07 | Harford Composite Sq. (MD-008) |
| 1655 | Syed M. Karim | 13-Jul-07 | Bethesda-Chevy Chase Comp. Sq. (MD-071) |
| 1666 | Elizabeth J. Peters | 15-Oct-07 | Harford Composite Sq. (MD-008) |
| 1667 | Janice A. Watson | 15-Oct-07 | Easton Composite Sq. (MD-079) |
| 1711 | Zachary T. Bowen | 31-Oct-08 | Mt. Airy Composite Sq. (MD-091) |
| 1721 | Wayne S. Mowery Jr. | 15-Jan-09 | Osprey Composite Sq. (MD-022) |
| 1737 | Victor R. Traven | 25-Jun-09 | St. Mary's Composite Sq. (MD-089) |
| 1751 | Anna B. Bladey | 2-Feb-10 | Frederick Composite Sq. (MD-003) |
| 1763 | Alice W. Chan | 12-Jul-10 | Howard Composite Sq. (MD-038) |
| 1765 | John Brennan | 30-Jul-10 | Bowie Composite Sq. (MD-052) |
| 1779 | Shaharazad Purvis | 13-Jan-11 | Osprey Composite Sq. (MD-022) |
| 1789 | Todd P. O'Brien | 25-Mar-11 | Bethesda-Chevy Chase Comp. Sq. (MD-071) |
| 1792 | Sascha R. Maraj | 20-Apr-11 | Bethesda-Chevy Chase Comp. Sq. (MD-071) |
| 1806 | Robbert J. Olson | 11-Aug-11 | Calvert Composite Sq. (MD-007) |
| 1807 | Elizabeth R. Roberts | 11-Aug-11 | Harford Composite Sq. (MD-008) |
| 1808 | Jason O. LaPre | 11-Aug-11 | Calvert Composite Sq. (MD-007) |
| 1885 | Kathleen P. Crockett | 7-May-13 | Frederick Composite Sq. (MD-003) |
| 1905 | Christopher J. La Pointe | 27-Aug-13 | Mount Airy Composite Sq. (MD-091) |
| 1915 | Eashan Samak | 27-Dec-13 | St. Mary's Composite Sq. (MD-089) |
| 1923 | Robert J. Lewis | 23-Jan-14 | St. Mary's Composite Sq. (MD-089) |
| 1960 | John S. Rowan | 8-Jun-14 | Bowie Composite Sq. (MD-052) |
| 2052 | Emmy N. Hoyt | 1-Jul-16 | Col Mary S. Feik Composite Sq. (MD-028) |
| 2121 | Natalie A. Brace | 7-Aug-17 | College Park Composite Sq. (MD-011) |
| 2126 | Jessica G. Strauss | 25-Aug-17 | Col Mary S. Feik Composite Sq. (MD-028) |
| 2141 | Alexei L. Severnyak | 20-Dec-17 | Frederick Composite Sq. (MD-003) |
| 2232 | Matthew R. Fangio | 19-Jun-19 | Arundel Composite Sq. (MD-023) |
| 2243 | Wyatt J. Hartman | 17-Jul-19 | Glenn L. Martin Composite Sq. (MD-031) |
| 2301 | Rachel Rosenzweig | 7-Sep-20 | Bethesda-Chevy Chase Comp. Sq. (MD-071) |
| 2302 | Robert W. Miner | 19-Sep-20 | Glenn L. Martin Comp. Sq. (MD-031) |
| 2307 | Aurora Zoe Albertson | 26-Oct-20 | Mount Airy Composite Sq. (MD-091) |
| 2321 | Daniel M. Flanick | 20-Nov-20 | Mount Airy Composite Sq. (MD-091) |
| 2328 | Xander D. Shoemake | 6-Mar-21 | Cumberland Composite Sq. (MD-065) |
| 2352 | Greggor M. Hines | 17-Jun-21 | Glenn L. Martin Comp. Sq. (MD-031) |
| 2389 | Jordan C. Regalado | 28-Mar-22 | Col Mary S. Feik Composite Sq. (MD-028) |
| 2442 | Matthew M. Gray | 5-Feb-23 | Glenn L. Martin Composite Sq. (MD-031) |
| 2449 | Moriah Dawn Hersch | 12-Mar-23 | Cumberland Composite Squadron (MD-065) |
| 2451 | Benjamin E. Mullen | 17-Mar-23 | Towson Composite Squadron (MD-013) |
| 2458 | Vincent A. Martucci Bond | 7-May-23 | Granite Cadet Squadron (MD-879) |
| 2478 | Akiva Rosenzweig | 27-Aug-23 | Bethesda-Chevy Chase Comp Sq (MD-071) |
| 2485 | Andrew A. Emert-Higgins | 1-Oct-23 | Harford Composite Sq. (MD-008) |
| 2491 | Estelle A. Roche | 4-Oct-23 | College Park Composite Squadron (MD-011) |
| 2515 | Timothy J. Gann | 24-Feb-24 | Bethesda-Chevy Chase Comp Sq (MD-071) |
| 2559 | Cory N. Matejovich | 7-Nov-24 | Granite Cadet Sq (MD-879) |
| 2585 | Evelyn Rouland | 12-May-25 | St. Mary's Composite Sq (MD-089) |
| 2588 | Christopher Nolte | 3-Jun-25 | Bowie Composite Sq (MD-052) |
| 2591 | Blaidd R. Wilt | 23-Jun-25 | Glenn L. Martin Composite Sq (MD-031) |

== Legal protection ==
=== Civil Air Patrol Leave Act of 2010 ===
Employers within the borders of Maryland are required by law to provide at minimum 15 days per calendar year of leave for Civil Air Patrol volunteer members to respond to emergency missions as authorized by the U.S. Air Force, Governor or political subdivision as a part of Civil Air Patrol. The member must provide documentation to the employer if requested. This law was signed by Gov. Martin O'Malley on May 20, 2010.

== See also ==
- Maryland Air National Guard
- Maryland Defense Force
