= Illinois College of Photography =

The Illinois College of Photography and Bissell College of Photo Engraving was a college in Effingham, Illinois opened in 1893 and closed in 1931, with a focus on practical, vocational photographic training.

The college was founded by photographer Lewis H. Bissell, and was located initially on the Austin College campus in Effingham County, Illinois. It later moved to its separate studio and buildings in 1900 at 910–945 Wabash Ave in Effingham. At one time the school had several hundred students from the U.S., Canada and 52 countries.

The college closed in 1931, due to poor enrollment during the Great Depression.

Graduates were expected to "go out fully equipped and the fact that they are alumni of the Illinois College of Photography is a guarantee that they are artists in their lines. A diploma from this institution assures them the most remunerative positions in the best studios in the country."

== Notable graduates ==
- Fred Hultstrand (1888–1968), graduate 1911
- Edward Weston (1886–1958), attended 1908–1911
- Ellery Valdimir Wilcox (1882–1960)
- Tomar J. Hileman (1882–1945), Glacier National Park photographer
- Avery E. Field (1883-1955), graduated 1906
- Otto Hillig (1874-1954), who gained wealth and respect as a photographer in the Catskills, in New York State, eventually buying a plane and becoming famous for his transatlantic flight in 1931. He enrolled in the Illinois College of Photography in 1900.
- Nell Oakes (1881-1969), founder of Oakes Vegas Studio (1922-1941) in Las Vegas, NV.
- Glenn A. Davis (1894-1980), partner of Oakes Vegas Studio, photographer of Hoover Dam construction.
- June H. Carr (1878-1960). In the same class at the College as Otto Hillig, and briefly partnered with Hillig. Moved to Gaffney, South Carolina in 1903 and became a professional photographer there.
