= Mary Feik =

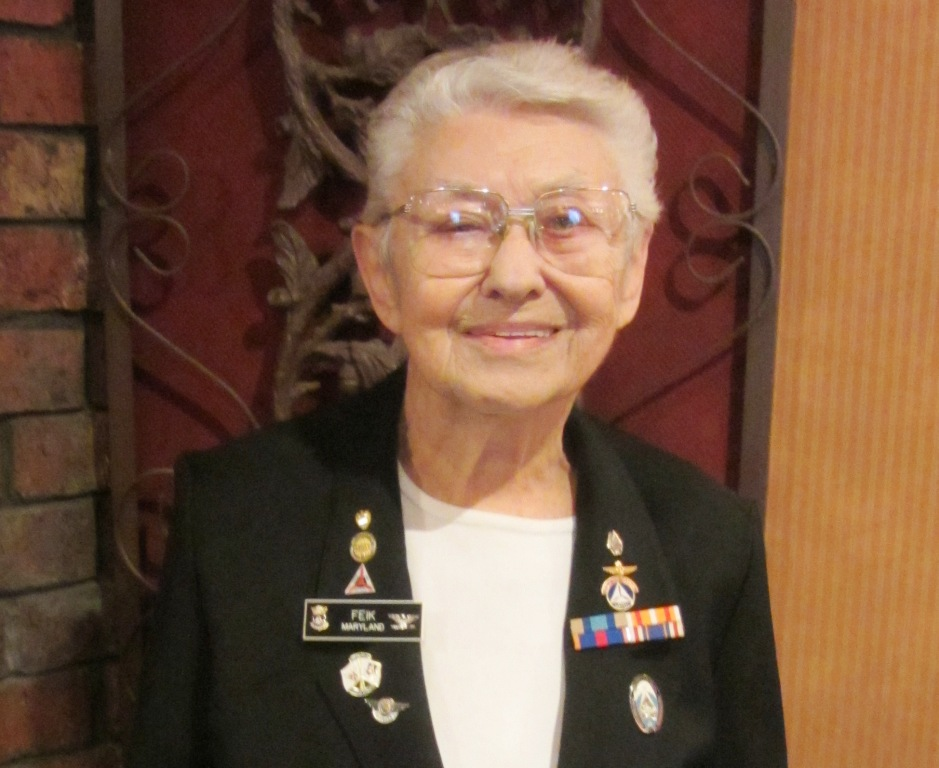
- Born: March 9, 1924; Cleveland, Ohio, United States
- Died: June 10, 2016 (aged 92); Annapolis, Maryland, U.S.
- Occupations: Aircraft Mechanic, Pilot, Restorer
- Spouse: Robert Lewis Feik
- Children: Robin
- Awards: Charles Taylor Master Mechanic Award; The Mary Feik Achievement Ribbon

Mary Feik (/faɪk/ FYKE; March 9, 1924 – June 10, 2016) was an American aviation engineer, mechanic, pilot, instructor and aircraft restorer. She received many awards and honors in her storied career and was a colonel in the Civil Air Patrol.

== Early years ==
She first became interested in aviation at the age of seven when a barnstormer came through her hometown area in a Curtiss JN-4 biplane. She rode in the aircraft and was enthralled.

Feik learned welding by age 11, and overhauled her first automobile engine in her father's repair shop when she was 13, then turned to aircraft engines and military aircraft at the age of 18. However, when she tried to enroll in engineering in college, the registrar told her, "We don't take women." She then took a job teaching aircraft maintenance at Seymour Field in Goldsboro, North Carolina. The base was not ready to operate, so she wrote to Wright Field for a position, which was accepted.

== Aviation engineer ==
During World War II, Feik became an expert on many military aircraft, and taught aircraft maintenance for the United States Army Air Corps in 1942. She is credited with becoming the first woman engineer in research and development in the Air Technical Service Command's Engineering Division at Wright Field, Ohio.

At a time when men dominated the cockpits of military aircraft, Feik logged more than 6,000 hours as a B-29 flight engineer, engineering observer, and pilot of P-51, P-47, P-63 aircraft. She rapidly transitioned from primary trainers to the P-51 in two and a half weeks. When the Lockheed P-80 entered service, she was issued a brand-new model nicknamed "Mary's Little Lamb" in her honor.

While flying a P-59 jet fighter during gunnery training, she witnessed tracer rounds coming within feet of the aircraft's nose. "I was the only person to fly open cockpit in a jet airplane ... the airflow over this little windscreen was so great that I think I was off the seat no matter how tightly I was strapped down," she said. The job of a test engineer was a dangerous one.

Feik also used her expertise to design high-performance and jet fighter pilot transition trainers and aircraft maintenance trainers. The pilot training manuals and technical engineering reports she authored were distributed throughout the Armed Forces. Her deployable rigs allowed aircraft procedures and limits to be tested with running engines on the ground.

== Restorations ==
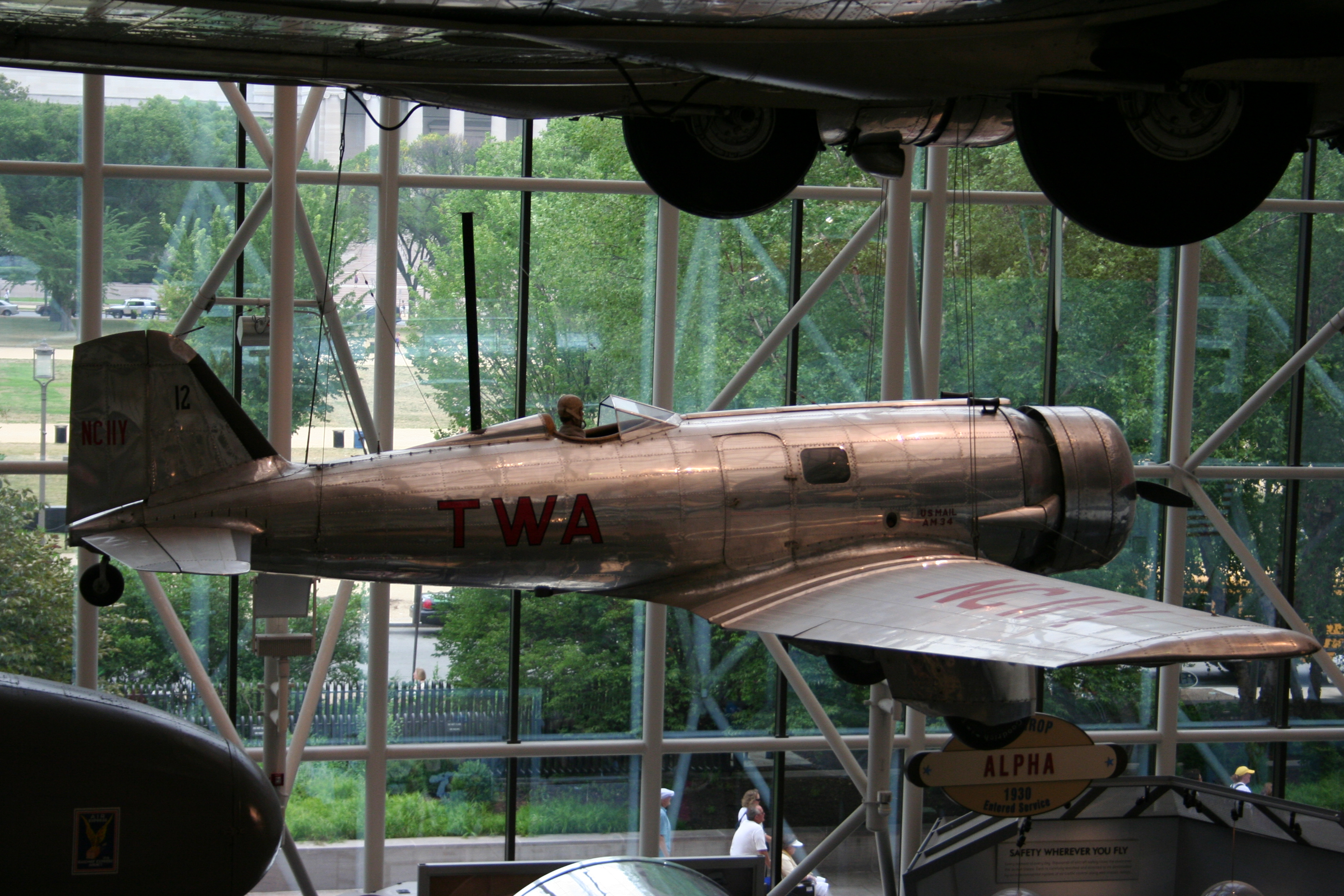
The Northrop Alpha project on display

Mary Feik retired from the National Air and Space Museum's (NASM) Paul E. Garber Restoration Facility as a Restoration Specialist. She restored antique and classic aircraft and has participated in the construction of reproduction World War I aircraft, helping restore the National Air and Space Museum's 1910 Wiseman-Cooke aircraft, a WWI Spad XIII fighter, Betty Skelton's Little Stinker and a 1930 Northrop "Alpha" mail plane. Feik's personal Short Winged Piper is undergoing restoration for donation to an air museum.

== Civil Air Patrol ==
Feik was the recipient of a distinguished service award from the CAP for her involvement between 1982 and 2016. Weeks prior to her death, Feik's home CAP squadron was officially chartered as the "Colonel Mary S. Feik Composite Squadron". Members of her squadron presented the official charter and new squadron patch design to Feik at her bedside in Annapolis. She said her "ultimate Honor" was the ribbon named after her. The achievement that was given her name is the Senior Airman cadet grade. It is the third of the cadet grades.

== Honors ==
CAP Mary Feik Achievement ribbon

A recipient of many aerospace honors, in 1994 Feik was inducted into the Women in Aviation International Pioneer Hall of Fame. On February 24, 1996, she received the Federal Aviation Administration's Charles Taylor Master Mechanic Award in recognition of her many outstanding contributions to aviation safety. The award requires the recipient to have actively worked as an aircraft mechanic for at least 50 years. Feik was the first woman to ever receive the award, named for the Wright brothers' mechanic and engineer.

Mary Feik's proudest professional honor was bestowed in 2003. "My ultimate honor is the Civil Air Patrol cadet achievement created in my name."

== Personal ==
She married Robert Feik June 17, 1950; they remained married for 54 years, until his death in 2004 at the age of 85. She had a daughter named Robin Feik resided in Annapolis, Maryland. Robin served as Civil Air Patrol's Idaho Wing commander from 2021-2024. Every year, she gave a speech to cadets from throughout Civil Air Patrol at the National Honor Guard Academy and also to a gathered assembly of basic cadets and staff at the Civil Air Patrol's Tri-Wing Encampment, held by Maryland Wing.

Mary Feik died from cancer on June 10, 2016, at her home in Annapolis.

The PA-20 Piper Pacer she once owned is being restored through the Build a Plane foundation. Which is being rebuilt in a high school program in the Metropolitan Washington DC area.
