= Holger Hoiriis =

American Danish-born pilot (1901–1942)

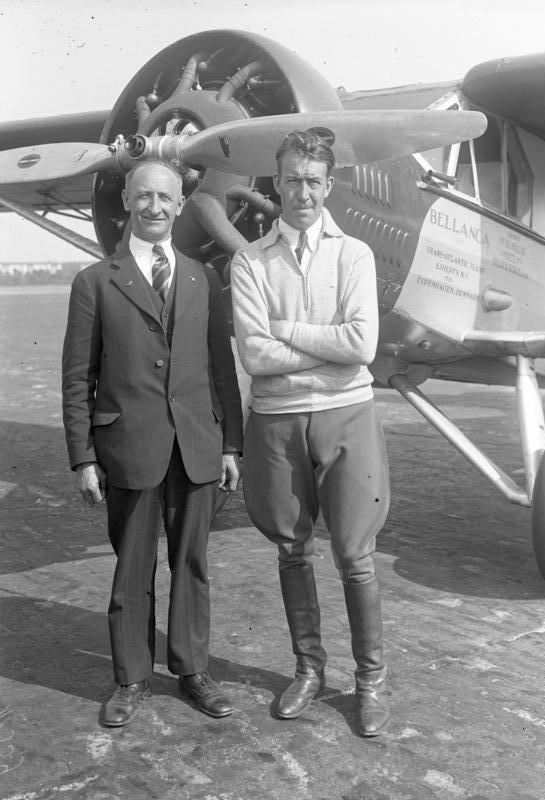
Hoiriis (right) and Hillig after their transatlantic flight in 1931

Holger Hoiriis or Højriis in Danish (1901–1942), was born in the Brabrand area, Denmark, but emigrated to the United States, where he became a recognized pilot in the 1930-1940s. He was the first Dane who made a transatlantic flight, which made him famous in Denmark.

Holger Hoiriis gave up his work in agriculture and went to the U.S. in 1924, at the age of 23. He took flying lessons on Long Island, then bought a plane. It didn't take long before he earned money by performing various acrobatic tricks or barnstorming. It gave him the nickname, hold your horses Hoiriis. People could also get a trip in his plane for a fee. A trip cost $1.50, and after some time, he owned several planes. Some years later he worked as a flight instructor at the Air Services of Bellanca Airfield and by Bellanca Company as a test pilot. He was one of the pioneer pilots of All American Aviation mail pickup service, and in 1939 he demonstrated the world's first night pickup service at Bellanca Airfield. With the approach of World War II, Hoiriis became the first wing commander of the Delaware Wing Civil Air Patrol, whose core mission, was to patrol the east coast of the United States, trying to find German submarines. He did that very effectively and was the first to introduce defined search patterns, so that all of the Delaware coast was patrolled. This led to the ironic nickname willy nilly. Holger Hoiriis married Miss Boynton; they had three daughters together. He died in 1942 of complications from typhoid and was interred at Laurel Hill Cemetery in Philadelphia.

== Transatlantic flight ==
Through this work with barnstorming, he met Otto Hillig, who was a noted photographer and pioneer of aerial photography. They got the idea to fly across the Atlantic from the U.S. to Denmark. The first transatlantic flight was made only 12 years earlier. Hillig financed the majority of the project. Hoiriis was the pilot on the entire trip because Hillig was not a very experienced pilot, but he could, however, replace Hoiriis for short periods. On 24 June 1931, the couple took off from Newfoundland in their red and silver / white Bellanca Pacemaker, with the name Liberty painted on the side of the plane. Liberty was the name of the small town in New York state where Hillig lived and had earned his money. They included 600 gallons of gasoline to the 3,150-mile (5,070 km) long trip. But the weather was not too good. They flew into the rain, fog, strong northerly winds, wind, and ice. The Liberty's first destination was Copenhagen, and then Hilligs birthplace, Steinbrucken, Germany. The fog was so strong that they could not see the Atlantic Ocean for 17 hours. Early in the morning, Hoiriis dived the plane down through a hole in the clouds, and there was the earth. It could only be England, on the road to Copenhagen. They expected to see the English Channel, every minute, but it did not happen. As far as the eye stretched, there was only land to see, and therefore they believed that it was France. Soon the realized it was Spain. The fog had got them off course, and Hoiriis then headed north.

It was late in the afternoon when they spotted an airport. Hoiriis, who had flown for 32 hours, was exhausted and decided to land. The airport was Krefeld Airfield in Germany near the Dutch border. He tumbled out of the plane and dozed off under the aircraft's wing. Hillig found a phone and called Copenhagen. He found out that thousands of people were waiting to pay tribute to them. Hoiriis then pulled himself together and tried to fly the rest of the way, but he only managed to fly, to Bremen before he totally exhausted had to give up. Right after the landing Hoiriis fell asleep and had to be carried over to the hangar. Next day came their triumph. About 50,000 people were in Kastrup Airport, including Hoiriis's mother, and two of Hilligs friends from Liberty. There were parades; medals were handed over, as well as a large banquet at the City Hall. Christian X of Denmark gave Hoiriis a medal. When they returned to the U.S., they were also greeted by crowds of people.
