= Richard Avery Hornsby =

18th century British naval captain

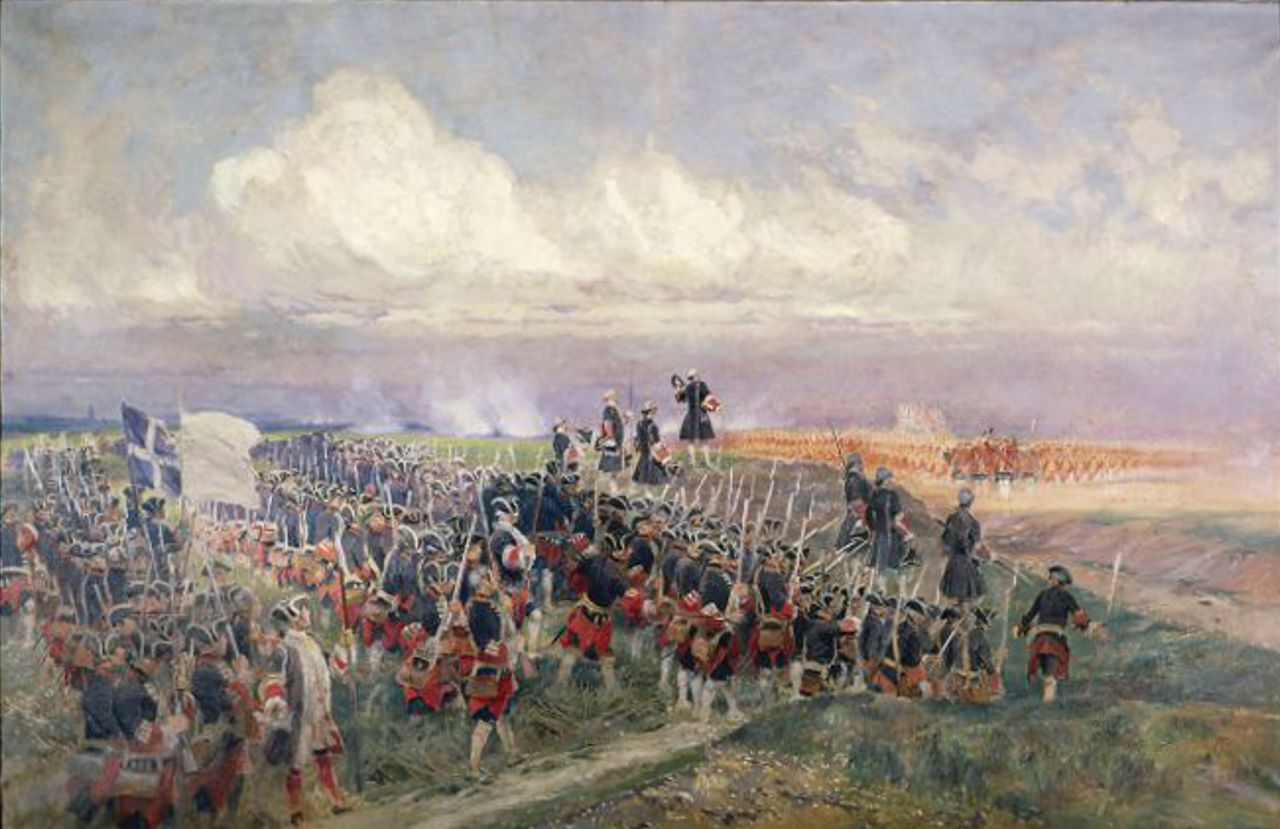
The Battle of Fontenoy by Édouard Detaille. Oil on canvas.

Captain Richard Avery Hornsby (died 1818) was an 18th-century British military figure, famous for successfully taking on a boat full of French pirates in 1744.

== Biography ==
Hornsby lived on Vine Street in Sunderland, Tyne and Wear, at the time of the War of the Austrian Succession. He was set to take his brig, the Wrightson and Isabella, to The Hague. The ship was designed for a routine voyage, boasting only a crew of seven, with four small guns, two swivel cannons, and a few blunderbusses.

The Marquis of Brancas, with a crew of 75 French pirates, as well as ten guns, eight swivel cannons, and 300 small arms, spotted the Wrightson and Isabella off of the Dutch coast, and engaged the ship in combat on 13 June 1744. The two ships battled for an hour, including two failed attempts by the French to board the Isabella.

When a shot from the British side caused the Brancas to sheer off, Hornsby put the Union Jack back up and led his crew in giving the pirates three rousing cheers. The Brancas returned, however, with a volley of shots that wounded Hornsby in the temple. When the French ship once again drew alongside the British brig, the pirates on the Brancas refused their captain's demands to go aboard and face Hornsby. Admitting defeat, the French captain cut the lashings and started to sail away, only for his vessel to explode a few moments later. Of the 75 sailors on board, 36 were killed or wounded in battle, and all but three drowned upon its sinking.

At a ceremony held at Kensington Palace in September 1744, Hornsby was awarded a gold medal and a chain worth £100 by King George II for his bravery. Each of his men was given a bounty of £5, while the two boys in his crew were awarded 40 shillings each.

It was believed that Captain Hornsby was buried in St. Michael & All Angels Churchyard, Houghton-le-Spring, near Sunderland. However, a search of the burial registers by local historian Paul Lanagan revealed that the Richard Hornsby who was buried in the churchyard had died in 1818 at the age of 67, meaning that he would have been seven years old at the time of the pirate incident.

== Legacy ==
At least two British naval songs and ballads have been written about Hornsby, one titled "Brave Captain Hornsby," and the other titled "A New Song in Praise of Brave Captain Hornsby."
