= Avery E. Field =

American photographer (1883-1955)

Avery Edwin Field
- Born: 1883; Sparta, Michigan, US
- Died: October 31, 1955 (aged 71–72); Riverside, California, US
- Occupation: Photographer

Avery Edwin Field (1883 – October 31, 1955) was a photographer known for his work in commercial photography and portraiture in Riverside, California, including extensive work in association with the Mission Inn.

== Early life ==
Field was born in Sparta, Michigan, where he began pursuing photography as a hobby as a teenager. He graduated from the Illinois College of Photography in 1906, and worked as a photographer in Michigan and Chicago. He married artist Charlotte Shepard in 1909, and the couple relocated to Riverside, California in 1909–1910. The move to Riverside was encouraged by Field's cousin Gaylor Rouse, who owned Rouse's Department Store in Riverside and introduced Field to Frank Augustus Miller, owner of the Mission Inn.

== Career ==
In 1911, Avery and Charlotte Field opened the Photocraft Shop, a commercial photography studio in downtown Riverside's Loring Building. The studio specialized in portraiture, as well as use of the Cirkut camera for panoramic photography. Field performed photographic work for the University of California Citrus Experiment Station during this time.

In 1931, Frank Augustus Miller provided Field with studio space in the Mission Inn, on the third floor of the hotel's rotunda. Field worked there until his retirement in 1952, photographing the Mission Inn extensively. Field's son Gaylor took over the business upon his father's retirement. Field died in Riverside on October 31, 1955.
