= AJ Clementine =

Australian model, internet celebrity, and writer (born 1996)

- Born: March 14, 1996 (age 30); Melbourne, Australia
- Occupations: Model; Social media influencer Author
- Spouse: Jacob Lucas (m. 2025)
- Modeling information
- Hair color: Brown
- Eye color: Brown
- Agency: Precision MGMT
AJ Clementine
Instagram information
- Page: avery jae lucas
- Followers: 462 K
TikTok information
- Page: ajclementine
- Followers: 2.1M
- Last updated: 28 September 2026

Avery Jae "AJ" Clementine Lucas (born 14 March 1996) is a Filipino-Australian model, actress, social media content creator, transgender rights activist, and writer. She is the first transgender person to model for the Australian clothing manufacturer Bonds, and made her runway debut in 2021 at Melbourne Fashion Week. In 2022, she authored the memoir Girl, Transcending: Becoming the woman I was born to be.

== Early life and transition ==
Clementine grew up with her mother and stepfather and her brother, Dane, and half-siblings Kiana and Sean. She also has a half-sister, Kali, from her biological father's second marriage. She is of Filipina descent through her mother, who immigrated to Australia from the Philippines.

Clementine, who was assigned male at birth but found out later in life that she has the intersex variation androgen insensitivity syndrome, began socially transitioning into a woman at the age of sixteen. She underwent gender affirmation surgery at the age of 22.

== Career ==
Clementine uses the stage name AJ Clementine on her social media platforms, including YouTube, TikTok, and Instagram. She is represented by the talent agency Precision MGMT.

In 2020, she was a featured model as part of a partnership between Instagram and Sydney Gay and Lesbian Mardi Gras. Later that year, Clementine walked the runway at the Priceline Pharmacy for Virgin Australia Melbourne Fashion Festival and became the first transgender model for the Australian clothing manufacturer Bonds. Also in 2020, Clementine became an ambassador for the Australian youth organisation Minus18 and released her own eyeshadow palette as part of a collaboration with Australis Cosmentics.

In 2021, she had brand partnerships with MECCA Australia, L'Oréal, Pandora, and The Walt Disney Company. In that year, she amassed 1.5 million followers on TikTok. She partnered with the French social media networking app Yubo for World Mental Health Day in 2021, the theme of which was Mental Health in an Unequal World.

In 2022, she authored the memoir Girl, Transcending: Becoming the woman I was born to be.

== Personal life ==
Clementine married Jacob Lucas, a dating and relationship coach, on 4 September 2025.
