= G. Avery Lee =

- Born: 1916
- Died: December 23, 2008 (aged 91–92); Lake Charles, Louisiana
- Education: Hardin-Simmons University; Yale Divinity School
- Occupation: Baptist Preacher
- Years active: 1958–2005
- Known for: Civil rights support
- Spouse(s): Ann Rader (d. 1973); Gladys Salassi (d. 2002)
- Children: 3

George Avery Lee Sr. (1916 – 2008 December 23 in Lake Charles, Louisiana) was a Southern Baptist and from 2001 onward, an American Baptist preacher.

A graduate of Hardin-Simmons University (baccalaureate degree, 1958) and Yale Divinity School (Master of Divinity), he served ministries in Baton Rouge, Louisiana and Hattiesburg, Mississippi, but for most of his ministerial career, he was associated with New Orleans' Saint Charles Avenue Baptist Church. He was known for supporting the expansion of civil rights and his active involvement in the New Orleans Federation of Churches. Lee was married twice, his first wife, Ann Rader Lee, dying in 1973; his second wife, Gladys Salassi Lee, died in 2002. He had three children: sons George Avery Lee Jr. and Gregory Lee and daughter Jeni-Su Lee Lacoste. Lee Sr. wrote 16 books in addition to numerous articles, Bible lessons, and devotionals. He retired from the ministry in 2005 at age 89.

When Newt Gingrich was attending graduate school at Tulane University of Louisiana in New Orleans, he attended St. Charles Avenue Baptist Church, and was baptized by immersion by G. Avery Lee. Later, after Gingrich began his political career, Lee joked that some had suggested he "didn't hold him under long enough."

== Bibliography ==
- Lee, G. Avery (1991). Affirmations of a Skeptical Believer (Google eBook). Macon, GA: Mercer University Press. p. 163. ISBN 0-86554-395-X.
