= Fred Hultstrand =

American photographer (1888–1968)

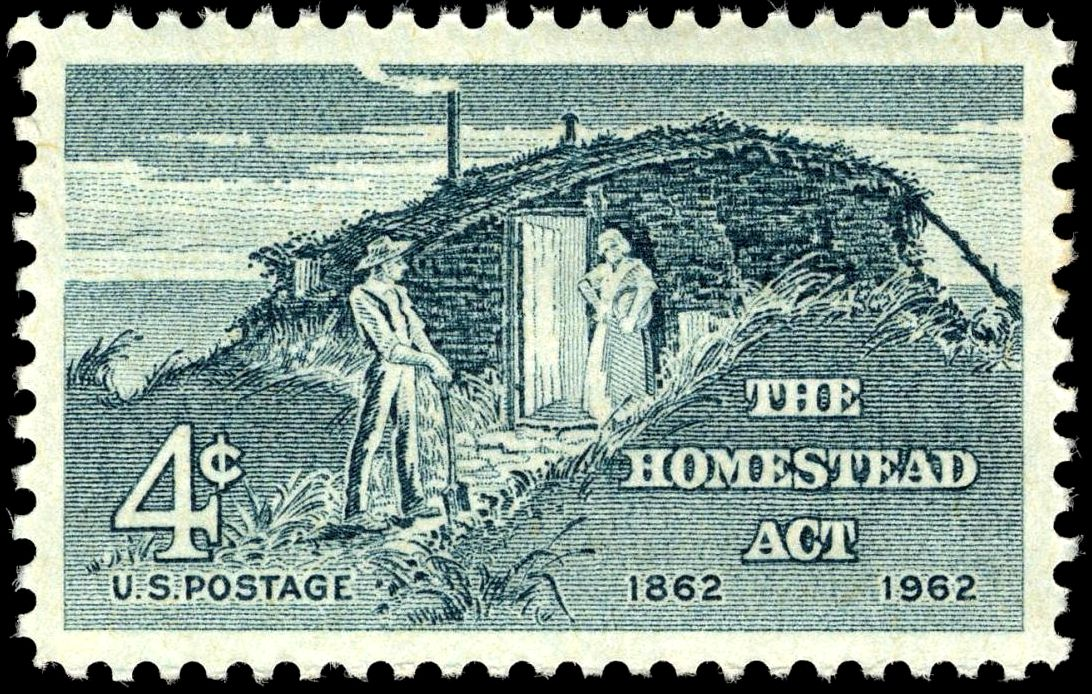
A 1962 stamp commemorating the centennial of the Homestead Act. It used a photograph collected by Fred Hultstrand as the basis for the art.

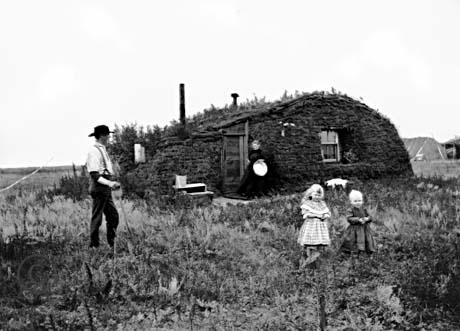
The photograph originally taken by John McCarthy, used as the basis for the stamp

Fred Hultstrand (September 13, 1888 – June 28, 1968) was a professional photographer whose work helped document life in the U.S. state of North Dakota in the early 20th century.

== Background ==
Hultstrand was born on a farm in Fairdale, North Dakota. He was the third of six children born to Swedish immigrants. He attended school in Osnabrock, North Dakota. In 1905, Hultstrand witnessed his neighbor developing negatives in the basement of his home and was fascinated. In 1909, he paid to be an apprentice with John McCarthy, a photographer in Milton, North Dakota. He went to Wallace, Idaho, to photograph lead and zinc mines. The next year, he went to study his art at the Illinois College of Photography in Effingham. After studying there for two years, he continued his studies at the Art Institute of Chicago. He made his way back to North Dakota, where he spent the rest of his life.

== Career ==
On November 14, 1917, Hultstrand married Eva Baker, an immigrant from Canada with whom he had two children. He purchased the photography studio in which he worked for the rest of his days in Park River, North Dakota. There, he offered portrait photographs, as well as film development and framing services. He also worked on photographs that documented rural farm life in North Dakota in that era. In 1937 Hultstrand served as president of the North Dakota Photographers' Association.

In 1962, the United States Department of the Treasury used one of the photographs that Hultstrand had collected as a basis for a stamp that commemorated the 100th anniversary of the Homestead Act. It featured the John and Margret Bakken family standing outside of their sod house near the town of Milton. The government of Norway issued a stamp (Utvandringen til Amerika: Norge) celebrating the 150th anniversary of Norwegian emigration to the United States, using the same photograph. Hultstrand died at age seventy-nine in 1968.

== Other sources ==
- The Library of Congress. The Northern Great Plains: Fred Hultstrand, Biography. Accessed on June 18, 2005.
- North Dakota State University. Pioneer Camera. Accessed on June 18, 2005.
