= Harry Avery Reid =

Director of Veterinary Services in New Zealand

Lt Col Harry Avery Reid OBE FRSE FRCVS (1877 – 14 September 1947) was a 20th-century British military then government veterinarian, bacteriologist and pathologist who came to note as Director of Veterinary Services for New Zealand.

== Life ==
He was born in London the son of A Reid of Walberton in Sussex. He was educated at Oakfield Preparatory School in London then took Veterinarian Studies at Liverpool University and the Royal Veterinary College, London.

In 1901 he emigrated to New Zealand to work in the Government's Veterinary Services within the Department of Agriculture.

In 1913 he was elected a Fellow of the Royal Society of Edinburgh. His proposers were Sir John McFadyean, Sir Frederick Hobday, Sir German Sims Woodhead, John William Henry Eyre and Orlando Charnock Bradley.

In the First World War he served with the New Zealand Expeditionary Force in Suez and Egypt. His address in his service record is given as Heretaunga in Wellington.

He died in Wellington, New Zealand on 14 September 1947.

== Family ==
He was married to Frieda Martin.

== Publications ==
- Vaccine Treatment of Mastitis in Cattle (1914)
- Poisoning of Sheep by Soda (1921)
- The Use of Iodine and its Compounds in Veterinary Practice (1929)
