= Avery Williams =

Avery Williams may refer to:

- Avery Williams (linebacker) (born 1994), American football player
- Avery Williams (running back) (born 1998), American football player

== See also ==
- Avery Williamson (born 1992), American football linebacker
- William Avery (disambiguation)
