= Avery Clayton =

- Born: March 17, 1947; Los Angeles, California
- Died: November 26, 2009 (aged 62)
- Education: Los Angeles City College; UCLA
- Occupation: Executive Director
- Employer(s): Mayme A. Clayton Library and Cultural Center
- Known for: Established a library and museum of African American artifacts
- Parent(s): Andrew Clayton and Mayme Agnew
- Website: http://www.claytonmuseum.org/

Avery Clayton (March 17, 1947–November 26, 2009) was an artist, educator, entrepreneur, and historian. He is known for having established a library and museum to house African American artifacts collected by his mother, the late Mayme Agnew Clayton.

== Biography ==
Clayton was born in Los Angeles, the eldest of three sons born to Andrew Clayton, a barbershop owner and Mayme Agnew, a librarian, who over forty years would assemble an impressive collection of African-American artifacts.

After serving in the Army during the Vietnam War, Clayton studied at Los Angeles City College and graduated with a bachelor's degree in art from UCLA. In the mid-1980's, Clayton began teaching art in public schools and working as a guidance counselor in Pasadena. He was known locally for his lithographs of African-American figures, and owned two art galleries.

In 2006, just days before his mother's death at age 83, Clayton signed a $1-a-year lease on a former courthouse in Culver City, California to house his mother's extensive collection.

"Her part was to assemble the collection," Clayton has stated on several occasions. "I really believe my part is to bring it to the world."

For the next three years, Clayton, a kidney transplant recipient, dedicated himself to raising the funds needed to open the Mayme A. Clayton Library and Cultural Center to the general public. The facility was scheduled to open possibly in 2010 or 2011 at the time of his sudden death from a heart attack on Thanksgiving, 2009.

Cynthia Hudley, a UC Santa Barbara professor and vice president of the facility's board of directors, was named interim director in the wake of Clayton's death. She stepped down from that position in 2010.

A public memorial service was scheduled for Saturday, December 19, 2009 at the Agape International Spiritual Center in Culver City.
