= Francis D. Vavala =

U.S. Army National Guard officer

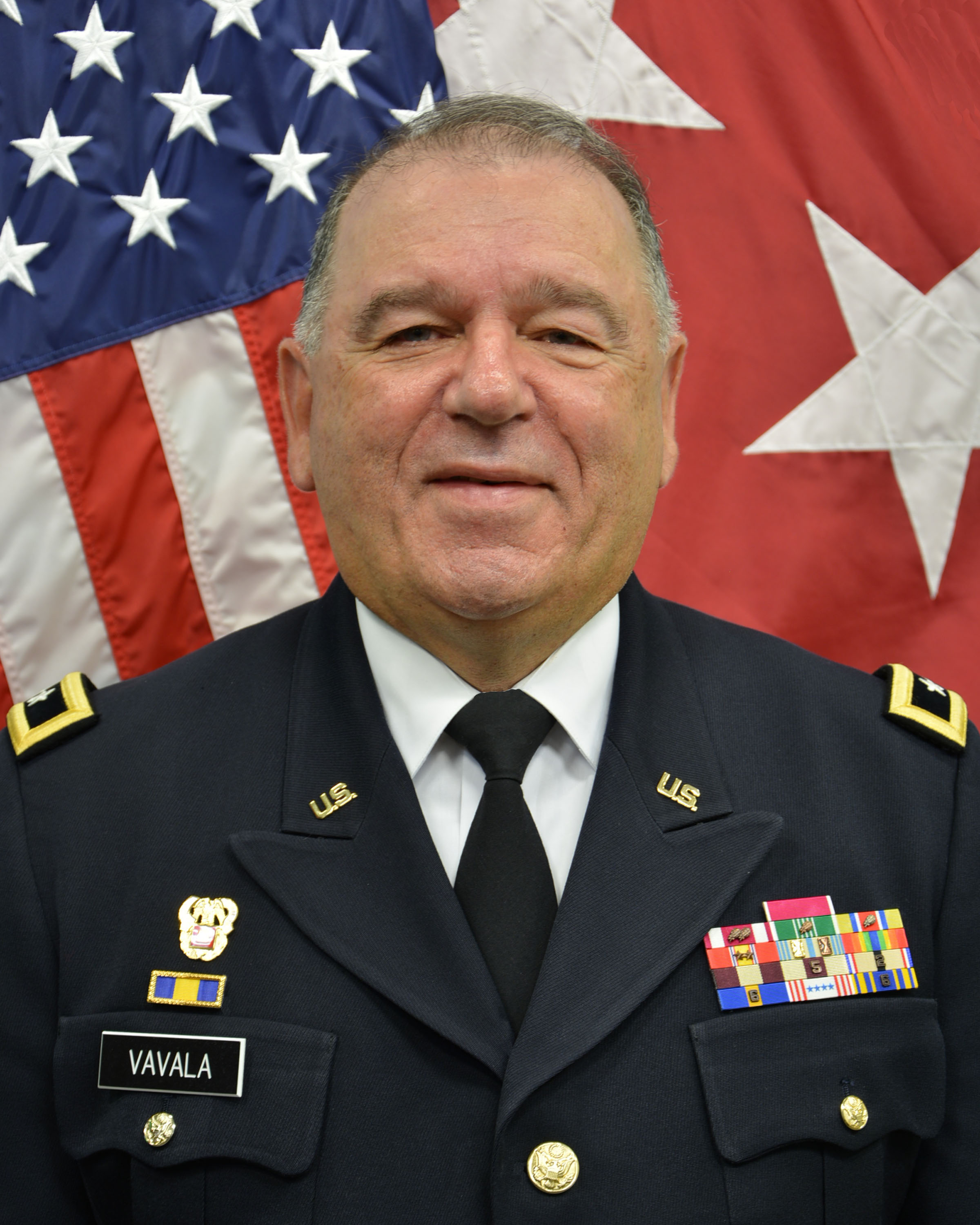
- Major General Francis D. Vavala
- Born: June 28, 1947 (age 79); Delaware
- Military career
- Allegiance: United States
- Branch: United States Army; Delaware Army National Guard
- Service years: 1967–2017
- Rank: General (Delaware); Major General (federal)
- Commands: Delaware National Guard
- Awards: Legion of Merit; Meritorious Service Medal (3); Army Commendation Medal (2)

General Francis D. Vavala (born June 28, 1947) is a retired Army National Guard officer who served as the Adjutant General of the State of Delaware. He received the promotion in February 1999 after the retirement of Major General George Hastings. In April 2017, Vavala was promoted to general in the Delaware Militia in honor of 50 years of service. He is the first Delaware National Guardsman to achieve four-star rank and one of the very few American service members to have risen from private to four-star general.

As the Adjutant General, Vavala was the highest-ranking member of the Delaware National Guard. He was responsible for managing the affairs of the Army and Air National Guard and for advising Governor of the State of Delaware, who is the Commander-in-Chief of the Guard.

== Early life and family ==
Vavala was born on June 28, 1947, in Elsmere, Delaware, the son of Frank and Nell Vavala. Vavala was raised with two other siblings, brother Gerard P. Vavala and sister Cissy E. Vavala-Gouert. He graduated from Salesianum School in 1965.

Vavala and his wife Jane reside in New Castle County, Delaware. They have a son, two daughters and three grandchildren. Before he was appointed as Adjutant General he was employed by DuPont as a Marketing Services Supervisor.

== Military career ==
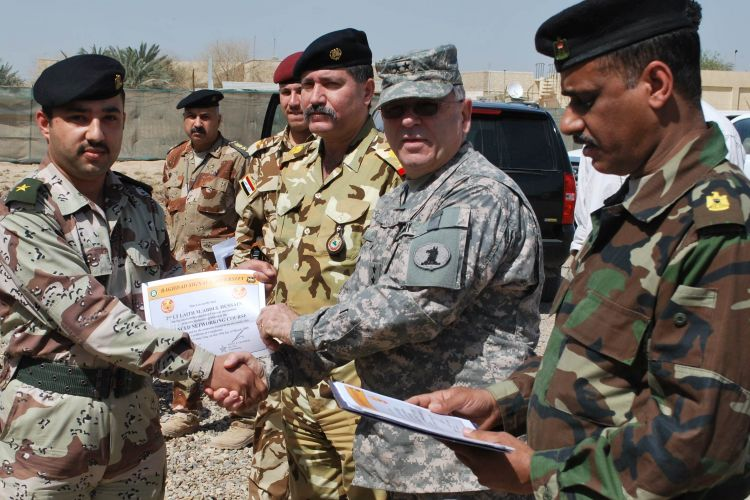
Major General Vavala presents an Iraqi army graduate of the Baghdad Signal University his diploma upon graduation at Camp Victory, Baghdad, Iraq, in 2009.

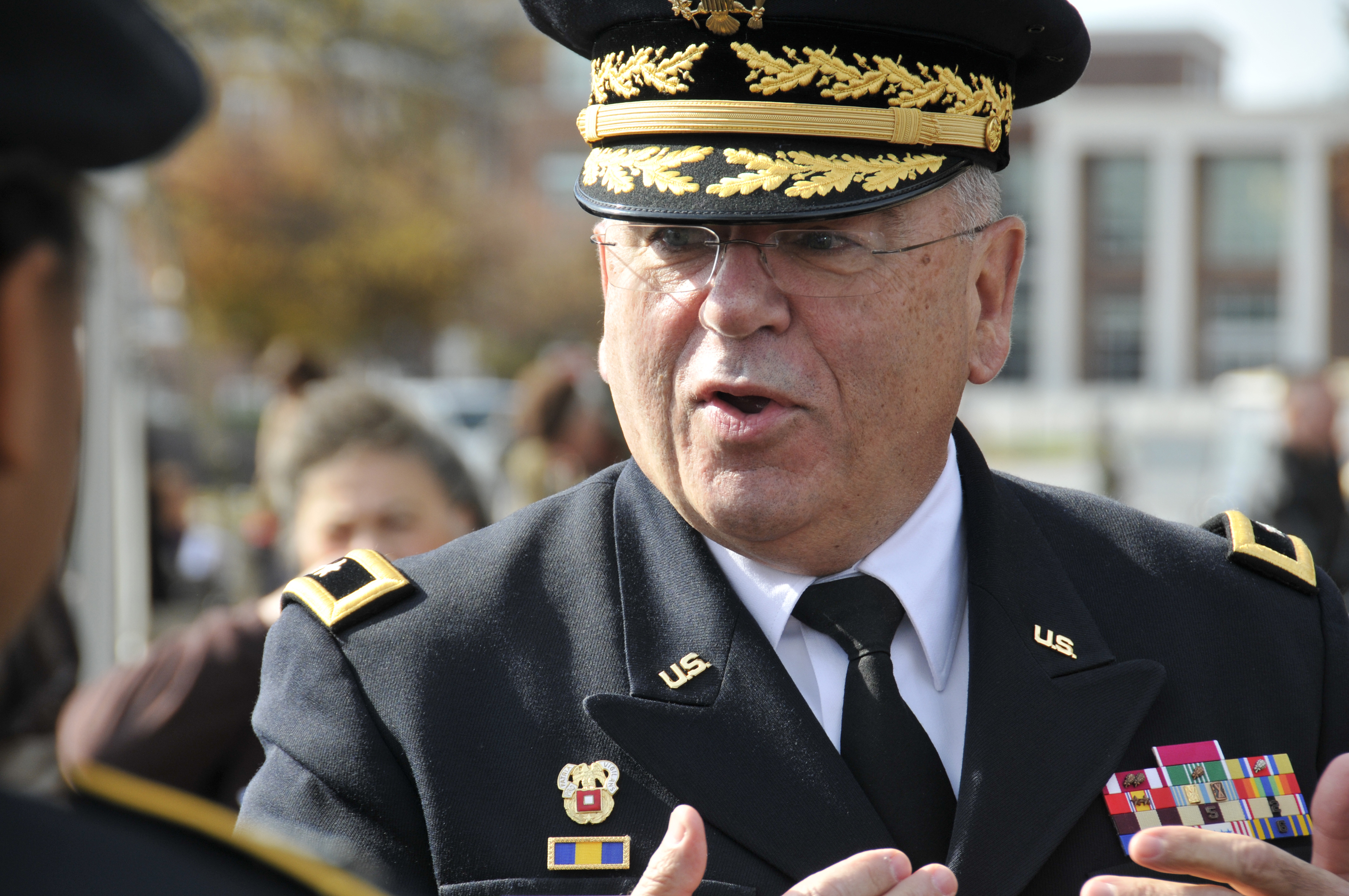
Vavala speaks with service members before the dedication of a World War II memorial at Legislative Hall in Dover, Delaware, November 9, 2013.

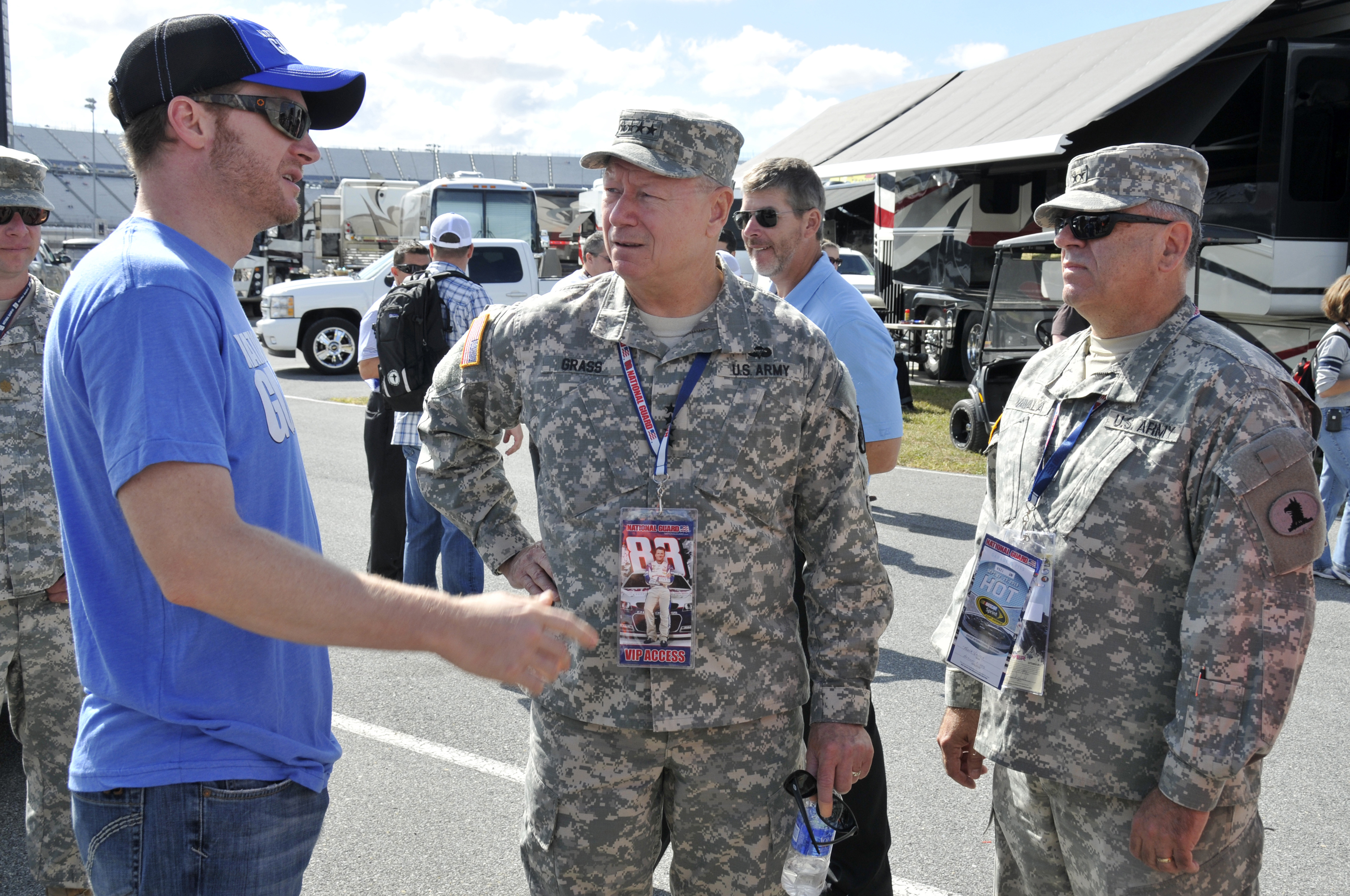
General Frank Grass and Vavala meet with Dale Earnhardt Jr. prior to the start of NASCAR's AAA 400 race at the Dover International Speedway in Dover, Delaware, September 29, 2013.

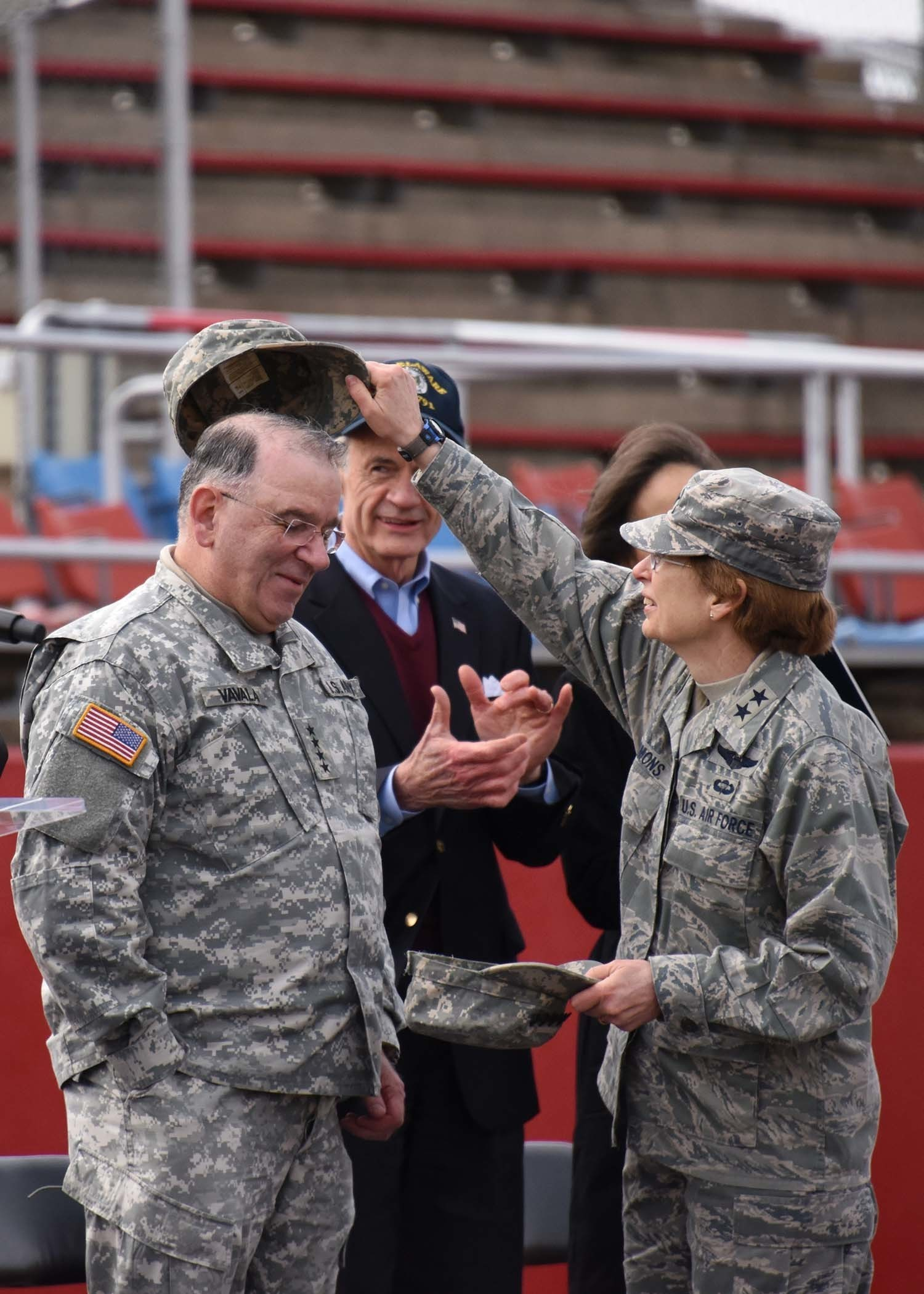
Major General Carol A. Timmons places the new cap on the newly promoted General Francis Vavala, April 1, 2017.

Vavala enlisted as a private in the Delaware Army National Guard in March 1967. He was commissioned in June 1970 after completing the Delaware Military Academy Officer Candidate School. Vavala has held a series of key command and staff positions. Prior to his assignment as the Adjutant General, he served in the following key assignments: corps tactical operations center platoon leader, Company A 198th Signal Battalion (United States); company commander, Company C 198th Signal Battalion; executive officer (XO) and battalion commander, 198th Signal Battalion; Operations Officer, Headquarters and Headquarters Detachment, Delaware Army National Guard; Communications Systems Engineer, Wire Communications Technical Engineer, Traffic Officer, Chief of Staff and Deputy Commander, 261st Theater Tactical Signal Brigade; Commander, Troop Command; Director of Plans, Operations, Training, and Military Support, Deputy Commander, and Assistant Adjutant General, State Area Command Headquarters, Delaware Army National Guard. From February 1999 to February 2017 the Adjutant General, Delaware National Guard.

== 2005 Base Realignment and Closure ==
Vavala lobbied against the 2005 Base Realignment and Closure Commission's recommendation to remove all the C-130 Hercules aircraft from the New Castle Air National Guard Base to bases in North Carolina and Georgia. Vavala worked with local elected officials and military leaders to stop the removal of these aircraft which would have effectively shut down the 166th Airlift Wing.

== National Guard Defense Enhancement and National Guard Empowerment Act (H.R. 5200 and S. 2658) ==
As the Vice President and then President of the Adjutants General Association of the United States (AGAUS) and the Chairman of the National Guard Association of the United States (NGAUS) Vavala worked for the passage of what is known as the National Guard Empowerment Act. This act allows the National Guard chief, a four-star general, to be designated as member of the Joint Chiefs of Staff. The bill was introduced by Sen. Christopher S. Bond, R-Missouri, and Sen. Patrick Leahy, D-Vermont. On June 13, 2006, Vavala spoke before the House Armed Services Committee. He said in part:

We do not accept the premise that all good ideas relating to the National Guard are reserved for the Department of Defense. We don't want to confront the DoD-we want to work with them. We also want our Chief, Lieutenant General H Steven Blum, to be permitted to fulfill the role of Chief, National Guard Bureau, which is to serve as the link of communication between the states and DoD. Just as Air Force commanders and Army division commanders, the Adjutants General are the best source for information about organizational health and readiness. Lieutenant General Blum is the most competent senior official in the nation to deal with the health and future of the entire National Guard institution.

On January 26, 2012, the Delaware House of Representatives 146th General Assembly passed House Joint Resolution No. 10 recognizing Vavala for his leading role in reshaping the Military of the United States of America.

== War on Terror ==
After the attacks of September 11, 2001, the role of the National Guard in American defense policy changed as National Guard units were regularly deployed overseas.

Prior to that, we were almost pigeonholed as a strategic reserve of the Army and Air Force. We've shifted to an operational force, a really indispensable force; this force that the Army and the Air Force need to be able to do their missions.

— Francis D. Vavala

Vavala was in command when units of the Delaware Army and Air National Guard were integrated with active duty forces in support of Operation Enduring Freedom and Operation Iraqi Freedom in Iraq, Afghanistan, Kuwait, Saudi Arabia, and Kyrgyzstan.

== Domestic operations ==
=== Hurricane Katrina ===
On August 31, 2005, "Task Force Delaware" composed of the 166th Security Forces of the Delaware Air National and the 153rd Military Police Company (United States) of the Delaware Army Guard deployed to Gulfport, Mississippi, in response to Hurricane Katrina. These were the first of over four hundred members of the Delaware Guard who, under the direction of the Delaware Guard leadership and local authorities, participated in relief efforts on the Gulf Coast.

=== Hurricane Gustav ===
When Hurricane Gustav hit Louisiana on September 1, 2008, the Delaware Air National Guard evacuated 285 hospital patients from potentially dangerous areas in Louisiana and Texas. The Delaware Air and Army National Guard sent two Black Hawk helicopters, communications and search and rescue specialists, as well as a Joint Enabling Team (JET).

=== War on Hunger ===
Vavala initiated a program entitled the "War on Hunger" in December 2008 which placed food donation sites in all Delaware Army and Air National Guard facilities as well as National Guard supported events. Food collected through this program is delivered to the Food Bank of Delaware to help feed families at risk in Delaware. Funds were also raised through the War On Hunger program to support the Food Bank's Backpack Program for children who experience hunger on weekends and when school is not in session.

== Honors ==
1985
St. Anthony Of Padua Youth Activities Council Man of the Year Award.
1992
E.I. DuPont de Nemours and Company, Chestnut Run Plaza Work/Life Award.
2003
Salesianum School Hall of Fame.
2005
Columbus Day Communion Breakfast Committee, Italian American of the Year.

== Civic affiliations ==
National Guard Association of Delaware, Association of the United States Army (AUSA), Knights of Columbus, Enlisted Association of the National Guard of the United States, Warrant Officer Association of the United States, Air Force Association (AFA), Signal Corps Regimental Association, Delaware Medal of Honor Historical Association, Military Officers Association of America (MOAA), the American Legion and the Sons of the American Revolution (SAR).

== Education ==
In 1984 Vavala received a Bachelor of Science degree in Business Management from Wilmington University. His military education includes the signal officer basic and advanced courses and the Command and General Staff College at Fort Leavenworth, Kansas.

== Dates of rank ==
| Insignia | Rank | Component | Dates |
|---|---|---|---|
| | Second Lieutenant | USAR | 20 Jun 1970 |
| | First Lieutenant | ARNG | 19 Jun 1973 |
| | Captain | ARNG | 19 Jul 1975 |
| | Major | ARNG | 19 Jul 1979 |
| | Lieutenant Colonel | ARNG | 29 Sep 1983 |
| | Colonel | ARNG | 15 Dec 1987 |
| | Brigadier General | ARNG | 20 Jun 1995 |
| | Major General | ARNG | 31 Mar 2000 |
| | Lieutenant General | DE | 7 Jan 2017 |
| | General | DE | 1 Apr 2017 |

== Awards and decorations ==
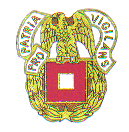
| Army Signal Corps Distinctive Unit Insignia |

| Legion of Merit |
| Meritorious Service Medal with two oak leaf clusters |
| Army Commendation Medal with oak leaf cluster |
| Army Reserve Components Achievement Medal with one silver and two bronze oak leaf clusters |
| National Defense Service Medal with two service stars |
| Armed Forces Reserve Medal with gold and bronze hourglass devices |
| Army Service Ribbon |

Delaware National Guard

| Delaware Conspicuous Service Cross |
| Delaware Medal for Military Merit with bronze award numeral 5 |
| Delaware National Defense Service Ribbon with award numeral 2 |
| Delaware Medal for Service in Aid to Civil Authority with award numeral 6 |
| Delaware Recruiting Ribbon |
| Delaware Physical Fitness Ribbon with award numeral 6 |
| Delaware National Guard Unit Strength Award |

== See also ==
- List of United States Army four-star generals

== Notes ==
Military offices
| Preceded by George Hastings | Adjutant General of the State of Delaware; 1999–2017 | Succeeded by Carol Timmons |
