= Delaware National Guard =

Component of the US National Guard of the state of Delaware

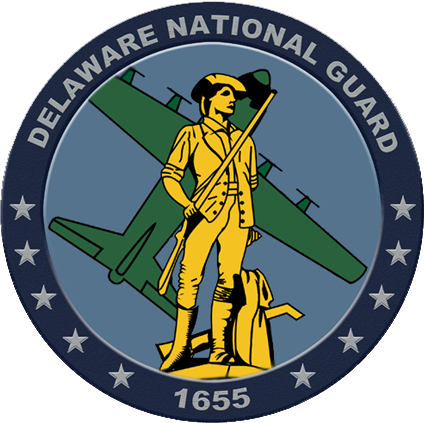
Delaware National Guard logo

Soldiers and airmen from the Delaware National Guard during the opening ceremony for the 2013 FedEx 400 NASCAR race

The Delaware National Guard consists of the Delaware Army National Guard, and the Delaware Air National Guard. It is a state agency of the government of Delaware. From February 2017 its commander, the state adjutant general, has been Major General Carol A. Timmons (1958-2020).

The Delaware National Guard comprises both Army and Air National Guard components. The Constitution of the United States specifically charges the National Guard with dual federal and state missions. In fact, the National Guard is the only United States military force empowered to function in a state status. Those functions range from limited actions during non-emergency situations to full scale law enforcement of martial law when local law enforcement officials can no longer maintain civil control. The National Guard may be called into federal service in response to a call by the president or Congress.

The Delaware State Guard served as the state defense force of Delaware during World War I and World War II to execute the stateside duties of the Delaware National Guard while the National Guard was deployed abroad. A Delaware state defense force is authorized by both the State Code of Delaware and Executive Order. It would be the state's authorized militia and assume the state mission of the Delaware National Guard in the event the Guard is mobilized. It would comprise retired active and reserve military personnel and selected other persons who would volunteer their time and talents for Delaware.

== Delaware National Guard State Awards ==
- Delaware Conspicuous Service Cross
- Delaware Distinguished Service Medal
- Delaware Medal for Military Merit
- Delaware National Guard Medal
- Delaware National Defense Service Ribbon
- Delaware Medal for Service in Aid to Civil Authority
- Delaware Recruiting Ribbon
- Delaware Physical Fitness Ribbon
- Delaware National Guard Governor's Meritorious Unit Award
- Delaware National Guard Unit Strength Award

== Notable people ==
- Major Beau Biden, former JAG officer and 44th attorney general of Delaware
- Major General Hugh T. Broomall, former assistant adjutant general
- Captain Althea Donawa, 8-time marathon finisher, serves on the National Guard Bureau's national marathon team
- Major General Caesar Rodney, officer of the Delaware militia during the French and Indian War
- Major General Carol A. Timmons, first female adjutant general
- Major General Francis D. Vavala, former adjutant general

== See also ==
- 198th Signal Battalion (United States)
- 261st Theater Tactical Signal Brigade (United States)
