= 261st Brigade =

261st Brigade may refer to:

- 261st Brigade, Royal Field Artillery, United Kingdom
- 261st Theater Tactical Signal Brigade, United States
