= RSP =

RSP may refer to:

== Business ==
- Recognised Safety Professional, a designation awarded by the International Institute of Risk & Safety Management
- Rising Sun Pictures, an Australian visual effects service provider
- Rogers Sportsnet Pacific, Canadian sports channel
- Rourkela Steel Plant, one of the largest steel plants in India
- RSP Architects Planners & Engineers, Singapore architecture firm

== Music ==
- RSP (band), a Japanese hip-hop and R&B group
- Rubber Soul Project, a Serbian rock music band

== Politics ==
- Progressive Social Networks (Spanish: Redes Sociales Progresistas), a political party in Mexico
- Rastriya Swatantra Party, a political party in Nepal
- Reformist Socialist Party, a socialist party in Italy
- Revolutionary Socialist Party (disambiguation)

== Technology ==
- Retail Service Provider, an end-user supplier for the Australian National Broadband Network
- Radio Spectrum Processor, an electronic device used in software-defined radio
- Role Swap Protocol, a communication protocol used internally by the USB On-The-Go standard
- Remote SIM provisioning, in mobile phone technology

== Transportation ==
- Rail Settlement Plan, provider of revenue allocation and support services to Britain's Train Operating Companies
- Recruit Sustainment Program, program of the United States National Guard

== Other uses ==
- Perennial sources list (WP:RSP), a list on the English Wikipedia that assesses commonly-discussed sources for reliability
- Rana Sura Padakkama, a military decoration of Sri Lanka
- Receiving stolen property, a crime in which an individual has possession of stolen goods
- Repositories Support Project, a project that supports development of UK-based repositories
- Reservestridsproviant, a canned food made for the Norwegian Army
- Resource Specialist Program, a category of special education program in some US schools
- Respirable suspended particle, particles of 10 micrometres or less
- Respiratory syncytial virus, a human pathogen causing cold- or flu-like disease
- Retirement Savings Plan, Canadian account for holding savings and retirement assets
- Riverfront State Prison in Camden, New Jersey
- Rickey Shane Page, professional wrestler
