= 31st Civil Support Team (WMD) =

31st Civil Support Team (CST-WMD)
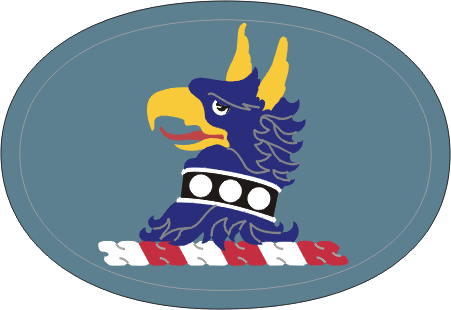
- Delaware Army National Guard shoulder sleeve insignia
- Active: 2005 - Present
- Country: United States
- Branch: Army National Guard, Air National Guard
- Type: Civil support team
- Garrison/HQ: Smyrna, Delaware

The 31st Civil Support Team is a civil support team organized as a unit of the Delaware Army National Guard. The unit is headquartered at Smyrna, Delaware.

== WMD-CST capabilities ==
The CST provides assessments and a presumptive identification to analyze most chemical, biological, radiological, nuclear, and high-yield explosive (CBRNE) agents and substances.

The 31st Civil Support Team, Weapons of Mass Destruction (WMD) maintains the capability to mitigate the consequences of any WMD/NBC event, whether natural or man-made. They are experts in WMD effects and NBC defense operations. The CST supports local and state authorities at domestic WMD/NBC incident sites by identifying agents and substances, assessing current and projected consequences, advising on response measures, and assisting with requests for additional military support.

The mission of the CST is to assess a suspected WMD attack, advise civilian responders on appropriate actions through on-site testing and expert consultation, and facilitate the arrival of additional state and federal military forces.

As the CST is on standby 24/7, the advanced echelon will deploy within 90 minutes of notification and the rest of the team within three hours. This quick response gives the CST the ability to support the incident commander with critical information rapidly. The CST commander can advise the incident commander as to the type and level of hazard present, possible courses of action, and additional National Guard assets that are available.
