= 126th Aviation Regiment =

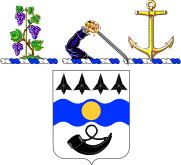
- Active: 1987–present
- Country: USA
- Branch: Aviation
- Type: Aviation
- Motto: Faith Flight Fidelity

Insignia
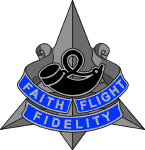
- Distinctive Unit Insignia

Aircraft flown
- Cargo helicopter: CH-47F Chinook
- Utility helicopter: UH-60L Black Hawk

The 126th Aviation Regiment is a unit of the U.S. Army National Guard.

== History ==
From 1963 the 26th Aviation Battalion had been associated with the 26th Infantry Division. A company of the battalion was established in Florida as part of the Florida Army National Guard. Changes to the regimental system in the late 1980s led to the superseding of the battalion by a regiment, itself part of the Aviation Brigade, 26th Infantry Division.

The 126th's lineage includes that of the 122d Aviation Battalion due to consolidation. The battalion was originally organized and Federally recognized on 18 November 1946 in the Rhode Island National Guard at Providence as the Medical Detachment, 43d Division Artillery. It was ordered into active Federal service on 5 September 1950 at Providence during the Korean War. With the division, the detachment was deployed to Germany to defend against a possible Soviet attack. To replace the detachment at home stations, a National Guard of the United States (NGUS) unit with the same designation was organized and Federally recognized on 2 December 1952. On 15 June 1954, the Medical Detachment was released from active Federal service and reverted to state control, and Federal recognition was withdrawn from the NGUS unit.

On 1 April 1959, it was converted and redesignated as the 43d Aviation Company, still part of the 43d Division, and relocated to Warwick. It was relieved from its assignment to the 43d Division on 18 March 1963, just before the division was inactivated on 1 May. On 1 January 1965, the company became Battery F of the 103d Artillery, and was further redesignated as the 43d Medical Company on 1 March 1966. On 22 December 1967, the 43d Cavalry, a parent regiment under the Combat Arms Regimental System, was constituted in the Rhode Island Army National Guard. Troop E was organized at Warwick from the 43d Medical Company and Federally recognized on 1 January 1968. Troop E became Troop D of the 26th Cavalry's 1st Squadron in the 26th Infantry Division on 1 May 1971. It was relocated to North Kingstown on 1 June 1974. On 1 October 1986, it was expanded into the 122d Aviation Battalion and relieved from its assignment to the 26th Division.

The 126th Aviation was constituted 1 October 1987 in the Connecticut, Massachusetts, and Rhode Island Army National Guard as a parent regiment under the United States Army Regimental System; concurrently organized from the 164th and 963rd Aviation Companies, the 1220th Transportation Company, and the 122d Aviation Battalion to consist of the 1st Battalion and Companies D, E, and F, elements of the 26th Infantry Division, and Company G.

In the mid-late 1980s the Aviation Brigade, 26th Infantry Division was reported to consist of:

- 1st Squadron, 110th Cavalry - MA NG
- 1st Battalion (Attack Helicopter), 126th Aviation - RI NG
- 3d Battalion, 126th Aviation - MA NG

The 126th Aviation Regiment was reorganized 1 September 1990 in the Connecticut, Massachusetts, Rhode Island, and Vermont Army National Guard to consist of the 1st and 2d Battalions and Company F, elements of the 26th Infantry Division, and Company G. Reorganized 1 September 1993 to consist of the 1st Battalion, Company F, and the 2d Battalion, an element of the 42d Infantry Division.

The 1st Battalion, 126th Aviation, is now part of the 56th Troop Command, Rhode Island Army National Guard.

The 3d Battalion is part of the Massachusetts Army National Guard. Its Headquarters and Headquarters Company is located on Camp Edwards, which is part of Joint Base Cape Cod in Bourne, Massachusetts.

== Current structure ==
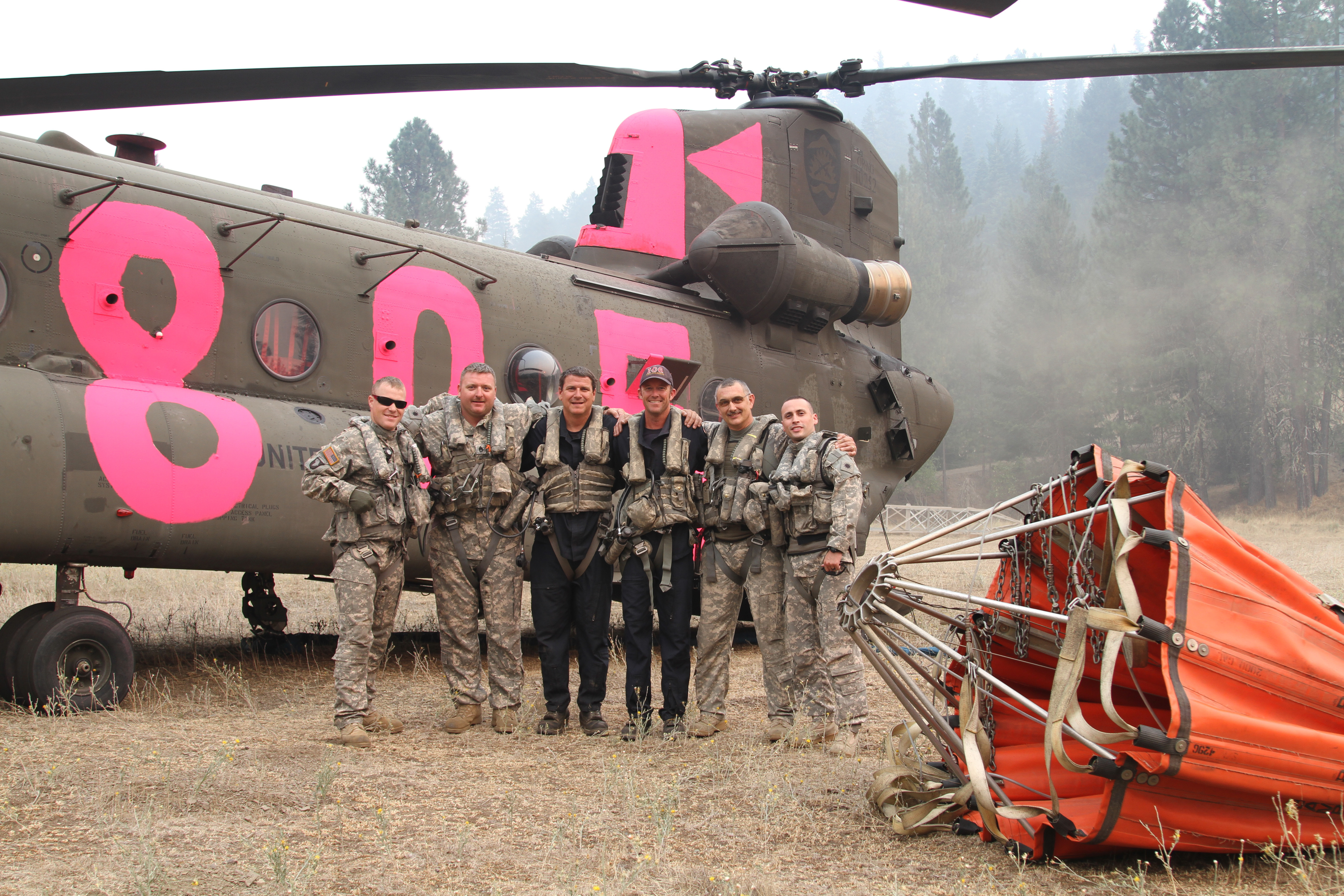
California Army National Guard aviators from 1st Battalion, 126th Aviation Regiment out of Stockton, Calif

- 1st Battalion (General Support)
  - Headquarters and Headquarters Company (HHC)
    - Detachment 1 (RI ARNG)
  - Company A (UH-60V) (RI ARNG)
  - Company B (CH-47F) Delta Schooners at Stockton, California (CA ARNG)
    - Deployed: Afghanistan May - Dec 2008
  - Company C (MEDEVAC)
    - HQ (RI ARNG)
    - Detachment 1 (DE ARNG)
    - Detachment 2 (NC ARNG)
  - Company D (AVUM)
    - HQ (RI ARNG)
    - Detachment 1 (CA ARNG)
    - Detachment 3 (DE ARNG)
  - Company E (Forward Support)
    - HQ (RI ARNG)
    - Detachment 1 (CA ARNG)
    - Detachment 3 (DE ARNG)
  - Company F (ATS) (CA ARNG)
- 3rd Battalion (General Support)
  - Headquarters and Headquarters Company
    - Detachment 1 at Camp Edwards, MA
    - Detachment 2 at Rochester, NY (NY ARNG)
  - Company A "BoSox" (UH-60L) at Camp Edwards, Ma (MA ARNG)
  - Company B (CH-47F)
    - Company HQ at Weide Army Airfield, Edgewood Arsenal, (MD ARNG)
    - Detachment 1 at Rochester, NY (NY ARNG)
  - Company C (HH-60M) (Air Ambulance)
    - Headquartered at Army Air Support Facility at South Burlington, Vermont (VT ARNG)
    - Detachment 1 (MA ARNG)
    - Detachment 2 (CT ARNG)
  - Company D (Camp Edwards, Ma)
    - Detachment 1 at Camp Edwards, Ma
    - Detachment 2 at Rochester, NY (NY ARNG)
  - Company E
    - Detachment 1 Camp Edwards, Ma
    - Detachment 2 at Rochester,(NY ARNG)
  - Company F (MA ARNG)
  - Company G (MEDEVAC)
    - HQ (ME ARNG)
    - Detachment 1 (HI ARNG)
