= Peter Jaquett =

Officer in the American Revolution

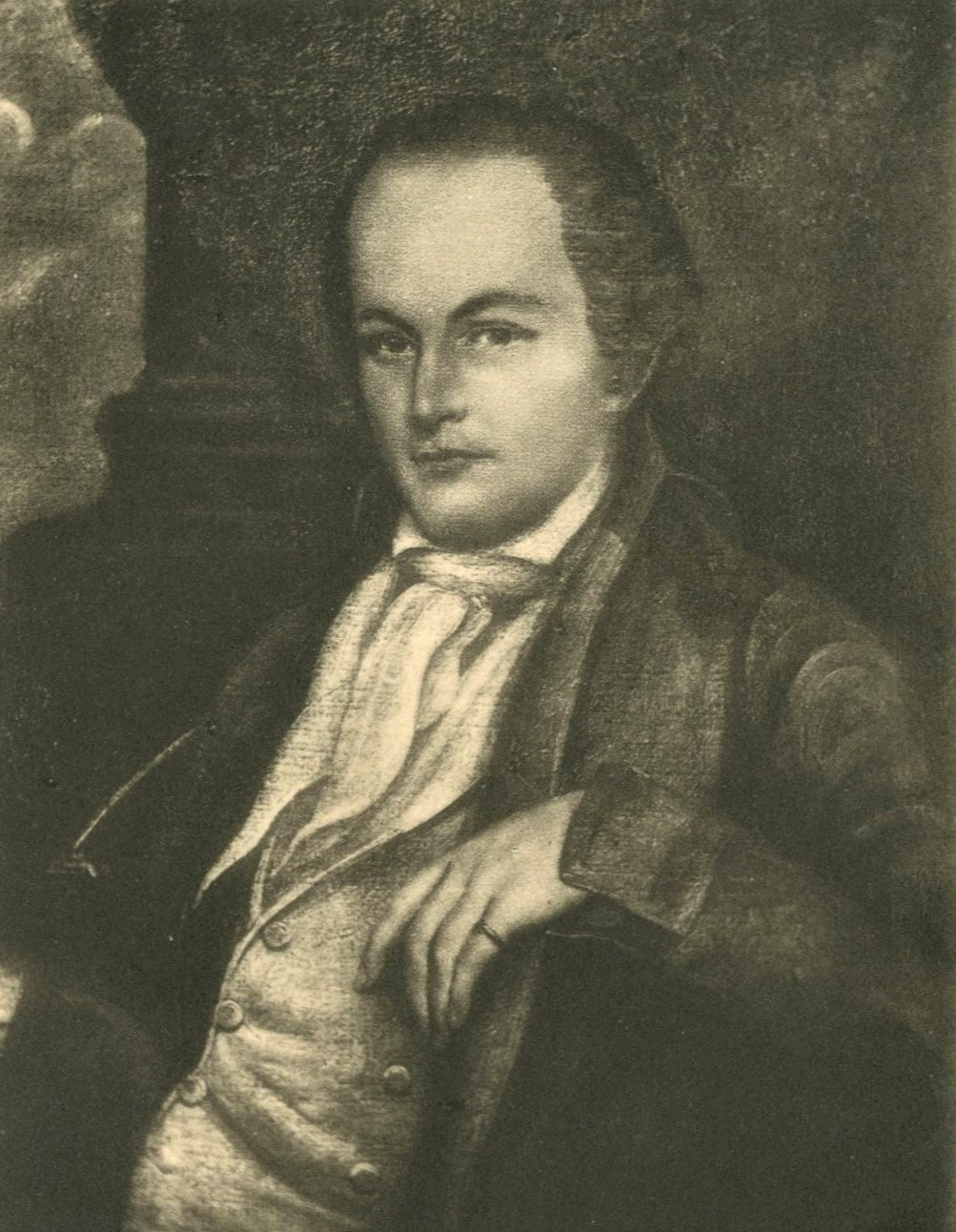
- Major Peter Jaquett
- Born: 1755; Wilmington, Delaware Colony, British America
- Died: 13 September 1834 (aged 79); Wilmington, Delaware, U.S.
- Burial place: Old Swedes Churchyard
- Spouse: Eliza Price Jaquett (1769–1834)
- Military career
- Allegiance: United States
- Branch: United States Army
- Service years: 1776-1780
- Rank: Major
- Unit: Continental Army
- Conflicts: American Revolutionary War; Battle of Camden; Battle of Cowpens; Battle of Guilford Court House; Battle of Eutaw Springs; Siege of Ninety-Six

Peter Jaquett (1755 – 1834) was a United States officer who fought in the American Revolutionary War.

== Revolutionary War ==
Peter Jaquett joined the 1st Delaware Regiment of the Continental Army on January 4, 1776, and served until April, 1780. He fought in every military engagement under Washington which took place in Delaware, Pennsylvania, New Jersey, New York, and the Eastern States. Jaquett was then ordered to join the Southern Army under General Horatio Gates; and he was in the Battle of Camden (August 16, 1780), in which the Delaware Regiment, consisting of eight companies, was reduced to two companies of ninety-six men each. The two surviving commands were led by Captain Robert Kirkwood and himself, as the oldest surviving officers. He also served in the Battle of Guilford Court House, the Second Battle of Camden and the Battle of Eutaw Springs. He assisted in the Siege of Ninety-Six and capture of the village of that name, and was also in every action and skirmish under General Nathanael Greene, in whose army he remained until the capture of Lord Cornwallis at Yorktown.

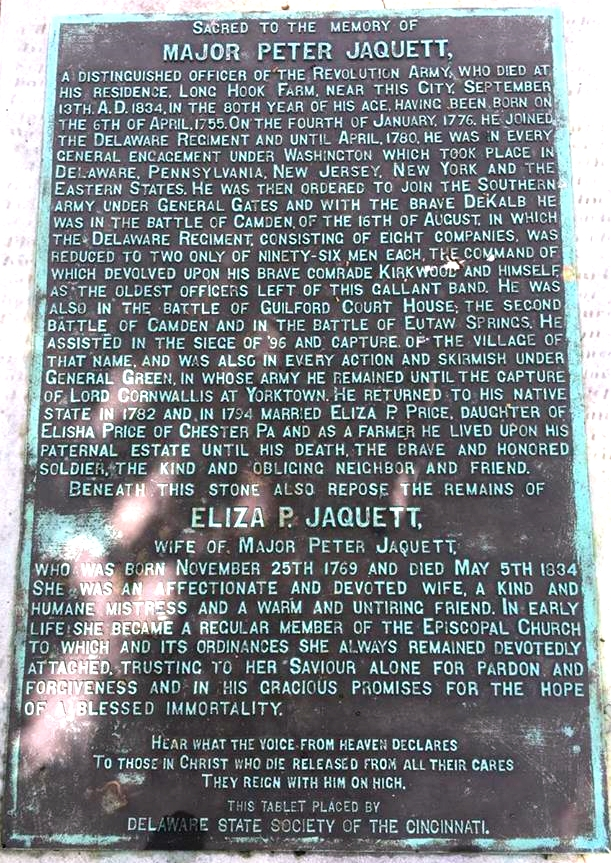
Major Peter Jaquett grave marker

== Personal life ==
Jaquett was born April 6, 1755, to Peter Jaquett (1718-1772) and his wife Elizabeth (1729-1801). After his career as a soldier, Jaquett returned to Delaware in 1782 and married Elizabeth (Eliza) Price of Chester, Pennsylvania in 1794. He spent his remaining years as a farmer on his parental estate, Long Hook Farm, just south of Wilmington, Delaware. Jaquett died September 13, 1834, and is buried at Old Swedes Episcopal Church Cemetery.

== Legacy ==
The Major Peter Jaquett Chapter of the Delaware Society of the Sons of the American Revolution is named for Jaquett.

== See also ==
- Major Robert Kirkwood
