= Carol A. Timmons =

United States Air Force general (1958–2020)

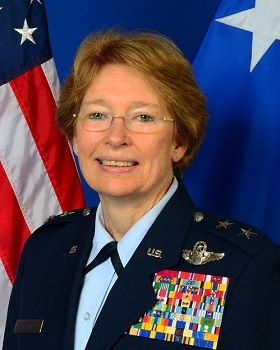
- Born: January 2, 1958
- Died: August 2, 2020 (aged 62)
- Burial place: Delaware Veterans Memorial Cemetery
- Military career
- Allegiance: United States
- Branch: United States Air Force; Delaware Air National Guard; Delaware Army National Guard
- Service years: 1980–2019
- Rank: Major General
- Commands: Delaware National Guard; Delaware Air National Guard; 166th Operations Group; 774th Expeditionary Airlift Squadron; 142d Airlift Squadron
- Conflicts: Gulf War; Iraq War; War in Afghanistan
- Awards: Air Force Distinguished Service Medal; Legion of Merit; Bronze Star Medal

Major General Carol A. Timmons (January 2, 1958 – August 2, 2020) was an American military officer who served as Adjutant General of Delaware from February 1, 2017, until her retirement on March 2, 2019. She was also the first female general in Delaware National Guard history.

== Biography ==
A native of New Castle, Delaware she graduated from William Penn High School in 1977 then enlisted in the Delaware Air National Guard becoming the first female member of the Security Police Squadron; in 1980 she graduated from the Officer Candidate School, Fort Benning, Georgia. The following year, she received Army Aviator Wings after completing Rotary Wing Flight Training at Fort Rucker, Alabama and served as a UH-1 pilot with the Delaware Army National Guard. In 1985, Timmons received her Air Force pilot wings from Vance Air Force Base, Oklahoma then served in the U.S. Air Force Reserve as a C-141B pilot with the 514th Military Airlift Wing (Associate) at McGuire Air Force Base, New Jersey. In 1993 then Captain Timmons returned to the Delaware Air Guard as a C-130H “Hercules” pilot with the 166th Airlift Wing serving progressively as an aircraft commander, current operations officer, assistant chief pilot and assistant operations officer; in 2005 she assumed command of the 142d Airlift Squadron then in 2007 was elevated to commander of the 166th Operations Group. As a colonel she was deputy commander for operations of the 166th Airlift Wing and Director of the Joint Staff for Headquarters, Delaware National Guard; promoted to brigadier general in April 2011, she became the first female general officer in Delaware National Guard history and subsequently served as assistant adjutant general for air while also serving as assistant to the commander of the Air National Guard. Promoted to major general in 2017, she was selected by Delaware Governor Jack Markell to serve as the state's adjutant general.

She served in Operations Desert Shield, Desert Storm, Southern Watch, Joint Guard, Iraqi Freedom, Enduring Freedom and Inherent Resolve. While deployed, Timmons was commander of the 774th Expeditionary Airlift Squadron, deputy commander of the 455th Operations Group and director of mobility forces, United States Air Forces Central Command. She was a member of the Air Reserve Forces Policy Committee and chair of the Joint Diversity Executive Council as well as serving as the Office of the Secretary of Defense for Reserve Affairs representative to the Defense Advisory Committee on Women in the Services. Timmons was a command pilot with more than 5,200 flying hours, including 400 combat hours, and was awarded more than 30 decorations, including the Legion of Merit, Bronze Star Medal and Air Medal. In civilian life she served as a captain with United Airlines flying the 757 and 767 aircraft; from 1987 to 1991 she was a flight engineer with Pan American World Airways; she amassed more than 10,000 commercial flying hours.

General Timmons attended Delaware Technical Community College and received both bachelor's and master's degrees from Wilmington University; she was a graduate of the Air War College and CAPSTONE program at the National Defense University. She has been inducted into the Delaware Aviation Hall of Fame and Hall of Fame of Delaware Women. Timmons was later revealed on a UK TV documentary to have been the co-pilot on UA23 on the day of 9/11 and whose plane was grounded after the initial attacks but was later suggested that it was possibly the 5th plane in the attacks as it might have had terrorists on board as well.
