= Civil Support Team =

United States federal organization

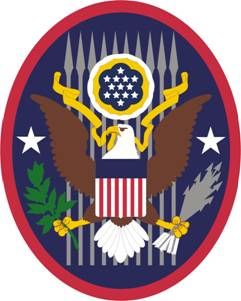
NATIONAL GUARD CIVIL SUPPORT TEAMS (WEAPONS OF MASS DESTRUCTION)

A weapon of mass destruction Civil Support Team (WMD-CST or CST) supports civil authorities in the event of the use, or threatened use, of a weapon of mass destruction. CSTs are federally funded units established under Presidential Decision Directive 39. There are 56 National Guard Teams, all full time, one in every U.S. state, Washington, D.C., Puerto Rico, Guam, and the US Virgin Islands with an additional team each in California, Florida, and New York.

== Units ==
- 1st CST MA
- 2nd CST NY
- 3rd CST PA
- 4th CST GA
- 5th CST IL
- 6th CST TX
- 7th CST MO
- 8th CST CO
- 9th CST CA
- 10th CST WA
- 11th CST ME
- 12th CST NH
- 13th CST RI
- 14th CST CT
- 15th CST VT

- 21st CST NJ
- 22nd CST PR
- 23rd CST VI
- 24th CST NY
- 31st CST DE
- 32nd CST MD
- 33rd CST DC
- 34th CST VA
- 35th CST WV

- 41st CST KY
- 42nd CST NC
- 43rd CST SC
- 44th CST FL
- 45th CST TN
- 46th CST AL
- 47th CST MS
- 48th CST FL
- 51st CST MI
- 52nd CST OH
- 53rd CST IN
- 54th CST WI
- 55th CST MN

- 61st CST AR
- 62nd CST LA
- 63rd CST OK
- 64th CST NM
- 71st CST IA
- 72nd CST NE
- 73rd CST KS

- 81st CST ND
- 82nd CST SD
- 83rd CST MT
- 84th CST WY
- 85th CST UT
- 91st CST AZ
- 92nd CST NV
- 93rd CST HI
- 94th CST GU
- 95th CST CA
- 101st CST ID
- 102nd CST OR
- 103rd CST AK

== Mission ==
The mission of the WMD-CST is to support civil authorities at the direction of the Governor, at domestic CBRN incident sites by identifying CBRN agents/substances, assessing current and projected consequences, advising on response measures, and assisting with requests for additional support. In the National Defense Authorization Act (NDAA), Fiscal Year (FY) 2007, Congress expanded the operational incidents a WMD-CST could be used to include the intentional or unintentional release of CBRN and natural or man-made disasters in the United States that result, or could result, in the catastrophic loss of life or property.

== Overview ==
The WMD-CSTs are National Guard units designed to provide a specialized capability to respond to a chemical, biological, radiological or nuclear (CBRN) incident primarily in a Title 32 operational status within the United States, the District of Columbia, its territories and possessions, as established by 10 USC §12310. Congress, the President, and DoD recognized that the WMD-CSTs, {responding under the authority of the Governor (Only for the National Guard)}, provide significant capabilities to assist local and state agencies that may be overwhelmed by a large-scale terrorist attack or where specific technical capabilities to identify CBRN materials are required. In October 1998, Congress authorized and funded the fielding of the first 10 WMD-CSTs. With this fielding began the development and evolution of new capabilities and concepts to ensure that DoD could support evolving interagency response plans. Since 1998, Congress has authorized and funded the fielding of WMD-CSTs in the remaining States and territories.

The WMD-CST consists of 22 National Guard Soldiers and Airmen, in Full-Time duty status; also known as Active Guard/Reserve (AGR) status. The unit consists of six (6) sections: command, operations, administration/logistics, medical/analytical, communications, and survey. The WMD-CST is required to maintain a level of readiness that will allow for a rapid response within established timelines. The unit is specially trained and equipped to assist local, tribal, state, and Federal emergency response organizations with state of the art equipment. They also have a technical and analytical reachback capability to other experts who may assist the local response.

The certified WMD-CSTs provide unique capabilities, expertise, and technologies to assist the governors in preparing for and responding to a CBRN situation. These WMD-CSTs are available 24 hours a day, 7 days a week for rapid deployment for response operations. The WMD-CST complements and enhances local and State capabilities. In order to ensure that the WMD-CSTs are capable of a sustainable, rapid response in support of a validated request for assistance, the following response management plan outlines a standardized approach to provide WMD-CST support anywhere in the United States:

- The WMD-CST is staffed, trained, and equipped to conduct continuous operations for a minimum of 72 hours using organic table of distribution and allowances (TDA) assets.
- If extended operations past 72 hours are required, additional WMD-CSTs will be alerted to provide augmentation or relief.

Codified as the Response Management Plan (RMP), this document ensures that a designated number of WMD-CSTs are always ready to respond to a national need, or to fill a request of a State without an available WMD-CST. A primary planning assumption is that each JFHQ-State is best informed to create contingency plans for WMD-CST coverage within its jurisdiction. Therefore, this plan is intended to be activated only when a specific support request is received at the National Guard Bureau (NGB) Joint Coordination Center (JoCC). NGB-initiated operational support requests will be the exception. WMD-CSTs support over 2500 events annually conducting counter-WMD activities.
