= Robert Kirkwood =

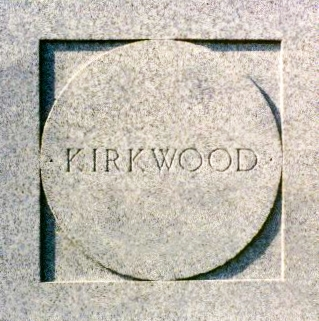
- Kirkwood inscription from the monument at Fort Recovery, Ohio
- Born: 1756; Delaware Colony, British America
- Died: 1791 (aged 34–35); Fort Recovery, Ohio, U.S.
- Burial place: unknown
- Spouse: Sarah England (1761–1788)
- Children: Robert Kirkwood, Joseph Kirkwood, Mary Kirkwood
- Military career
- Allegiance: United States
- Branch: United States Army
- Service years: 1775-1783, 1791
- Rank: Captain
- Units: Continental Army, Second Infantry Regiment
- Conflicts: American Revolutionary War; Battle of Camden; Battle of Cowpens; Battle of Guilford Court House; Siege of Ninety-Six; Northwest Indian War; St. Clair's Defeat †

Robert Henry Kirkwood (1756 – November 4, 1791) was a United States officer who fought in the American Revolutionary War and the Northwest Indian War. He died in 1791 during the battle of St. Clair's Defeat.

== Early life ==
Kirkwood was born in 1756 in Newark, Delaware, in what was then the Delaware Colony. He was the only son of nine children born to Robert Kirkwood, who was born in Ireland, and Sarah (née McDowell) Kirkwood.

Kirkwood studied religion at the Newark Academy (later renamed the University of Delaware).

== Revolutionary War ==
He was named a lieutenant of the 1st Delaware Regiment in the Continental Army on 9 December 1775. In 1776, the Delaware Battalion, under the command of Colonel John Haslet, was assigned to Mifflin's Brigade under Gen. Thomas Mifflin of Pennsylvania. He was commissioned as a Captain in a Delaware Regiment in December 1776, and tasked with recruiting a new company. His new company was received their first movement orders in February 1777. He participated in every battle in which George Washington fought in 1777.

In the 16 August 1780 Battle of Camden, Kirkwood's troops won praise from General Nathanael Greene, and were called "The Blue Hen's Chickens" after that. Due to the high number of soldiers killed, wounded, or captured, this battle reduced the Delaware regiment from eight companies to two. Kirkwood took command of one company, which was designated as a light infantry unit.

At the Battle of Cowpens on 17 January 1781, Captain Kirkwood repulsed the British cavalry, and made a famous bayonet charge ordered by Colonel John Eager Howard. Kirkwood also fought at the March 1781 Battle of Guilford Court House, where he recorded "many were Killed & wounded on both sides." After the June 1781 Siege of Ninety-Six, General Greene credited Kirkwood by name for his unit's "judicious and alert behavior." Kirkwood was with General Washington in his pursuit and defeat of Cornwallis.

Kirkwood held a certificate of membership in the Society of the Cincinnati.

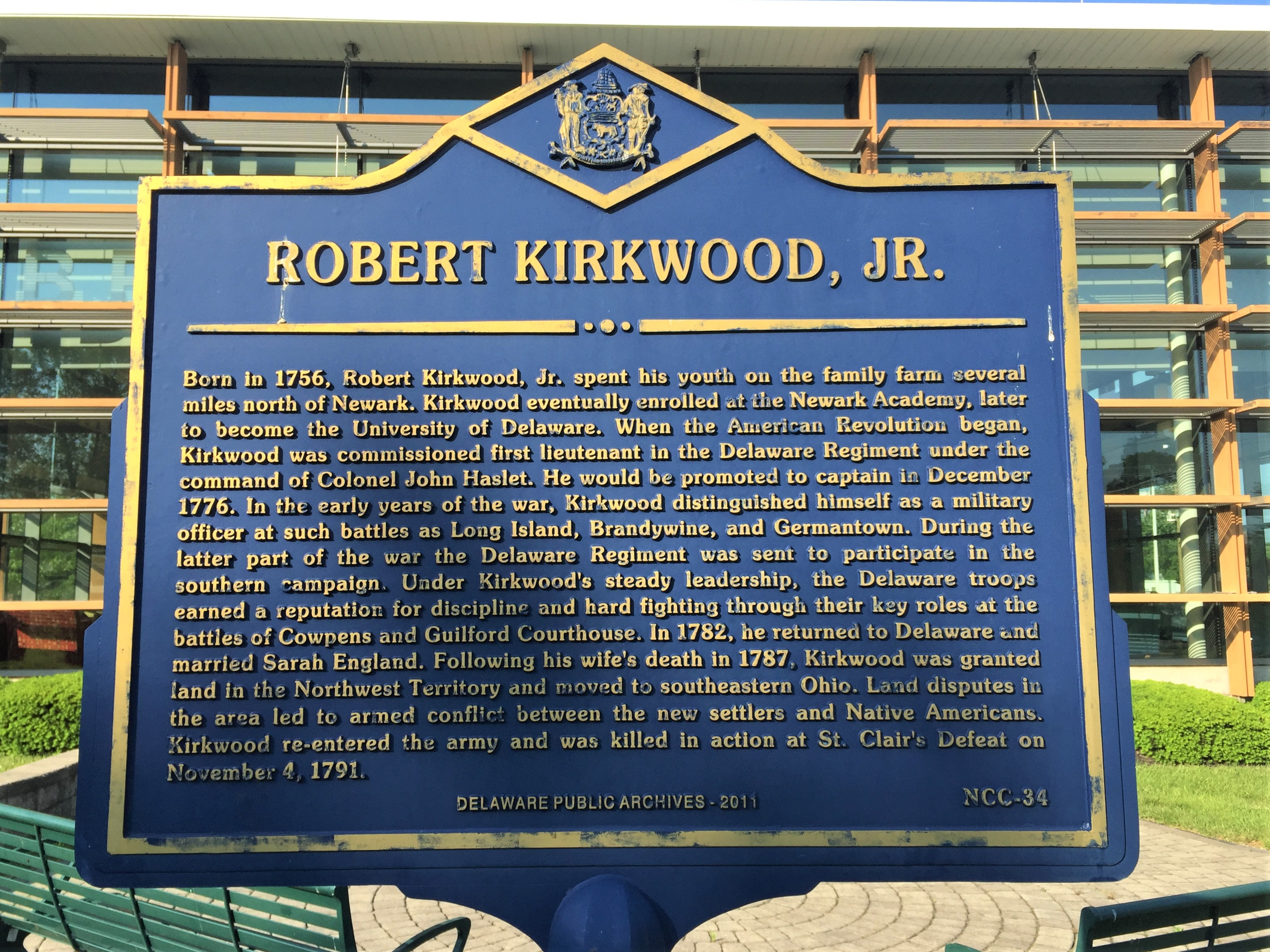
Historical marker at the Robert Kirkwood Library

== Personal life ==
After his return to Delaware, Kirkwood was married to Sarah England (1761–1788). Together, they were the parents of three children, only two of whom survived to adulthood, including:

- Robert Kirkwood, who died young.
- Joseph Kirkwood, who married Margaret Gillespie (1785–1866).
- Mary Kirkwood, who was married to Arthur James Whiteley (1770–1809).

Kirkwood's wife, Sarah, died in 1787. Later that year, Kirkwood purchased 260 acres in present-day Jefferson County, Ohio, and moved west, leaving his two remaining children in Delaware with relatives. In 1788, Ohio granted him additional land in present-day Belmont County, about 20 miles south of his property. He was appointed as a Justice of the peace for Washington County, Ohio Country in 1789.

=== Descendants ===
Through his son Joseph, he was the grandfather of Elizabeth Kirkwood (1818–1899), who married William Kennon Jr. (1802–1867), an Irish immigrant who became a U.S. Representative from Ohio.

His only daughter was the mother of Brigadier General Robert Henry Kirkwood Whiteley of Baltimore, himself the father of Robert Kirkwood Martin, constructor of the Gunpowder Water works which supply the city of Baltimore.

== Northwest Indian War ==
On 4 March 1791, Kirkwood was commissioned as a Captain in the Second Infantry Regiment, raised in response to the losses during the 1790 Harmar Campaign. Kirkwood's home in Wheeling was attacked that May.

Although ill, Kirkwood accompanied his company when his regiment departed Fort Washington in September 1791. On the morning of 4 November, a coalition of Native American tribes attacked the combined forces under General Arthur St. Clair, encamped on the banks of the Wabash River near the present-day border of Ohio and Indiana. Kirkwood was seen rallying his troops, but was soon shot in the abdomen. According to the journal of Ebenezer Denny, another wounded officer, Captain Jacob Slough, found Kirkwood leaning against a tree and offered to help him move. Kirkwood responded “No, I am dying, save yourself if you can, and leave me to my fate.” Captain Slough later recorded that Kirkwood feared capture by the Native American, and asked Slough to kill him, stating “God knows how they will treat me.” Slough “shook him by the hand, and left him to his fate.”

The United States retreated in disarray. Kirkwood's fate was uncertain, but he is listed among the 39 officers and 630 people killed at St. Clair's defeat. Virginia governor Henry Lee wrote, “It was the thirty-third time he had risked his life for his country; and he died as he had lived, the brave, meritorious, unrewarded, Kirkwood.” Nathanel Greene wrote, “No Man deserves better of his Country than Capt Kirkwood.”

== Legacy ==
- Kirkwood is the namesake of Kirkwood Township, Belmont County, Ohio.
- A monument was erected near Fort Recovery in Ohio to honor Kirkwood and others who died there. On May 9, 1941, a highway was named in honor of Major Kirkwood. The Robert Kirkwood Highway comprises a part of Delaware Route 2 in New Castle County. Kirkwood, Delaware, a small village at a crossroads on Delaware Route 71, also bears his name. The Major Robert Kirkwood Reserve Center is the headquarters of Detachment 2, 11th Battalion, 98th Regiment (formerly 9th Battalion / 80th Regiment Health Services) of the United States Army. One of the New Castle County public libraries is called the Kirkwood Library. It is located on Delaware Route 2 (Kirkwood Highway) and there is an historical marker for Robert Kirkwood adjacent to the library's parking lot.
- The Major Robert Kirkwood Chapter of the Delaware Society of the Sons of the American Revolution is named for Kirkwood. It has a Color Guard whose members wear the frontiersman uniform used when the Delaware Continentals fought in remote regions of the Carolinas, far from good cloth and family seamstresses.
- A North Carolina unit of the Brigade of the American Revolution (BAR) portrays Kirkwood's Company—the remnant of the Delaware Regiment which fought with the Maryland Brigade after the Delaware Regiment was devastated in the first Battle of Camden.
- His alma mater (later renamed the University of Delaware), chose the Blue Hen as its mascot to honor Captain Kirkwood.

== See also ==
- Peter Jaquett
