= 153rd Military Police Company =

Company of the Delaware Army National Guard

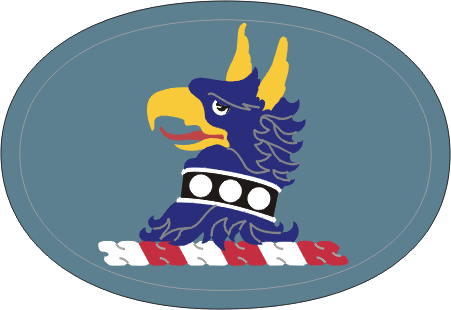
- Delaware Army National Guard shoulder sleeve insignia
- Active: 1996 – present
- Country: United States
- Branch: Army National Guard
- Type: Military police
- Size: Company
- Part of: Delaware National Guard
- Garrison/HQ: Fort DuPont
- Nickname: "Wolf Clan"
- Mottos: "One Team, One Mission"
- Colors: Green and Gold
- Engagements: Afghanistan; Iraq

Commanders
- Commander: CPT Mike Schiavone
- First Sergeant: 1SG John Brooks

Insignia
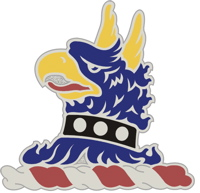
- Delaware ARNG distinctive unit insignia

The 153rd Military Police Company (Combat Support) is a unit in the Delaware Army National Guard. The 153rd MP Company, founded in 1996, is home stationed at Fort DuPont in Delaware City, Delaware. Since 1996, the 153rd has conducted missions in Panama, Saudi Arabia, Italy, Germany, Iraq, Kuwait, Afghanistan, and other locations across the United States.

== History ==
Since 1996, the 153rd Military Police Company has conducted operations in support of Operation Roving Sands, Operation Blue Crab, Operation Enduring Freedom, Hurricane Katrina Relief, Operation Jump Start, Iraq War, and the 2009 Presidential Inauguration.

Soldiers with the 153rd MP Company discuss a route recon mission during Hurricane Katrina relief operations at the Trent Lott National Guard Training Center, Gulfport, Miss., August 2005.

== Saudi Arabia ==
In September 2002, the 153rd Military Police Company was deployed to Eskan Village, Saudi Arabia, conducting force protection operations. The Delaware military police unit was augmented with one platoon from the 28th Military Police Company from the Pennsylvania National Guard's 28th Infantry Division. The two MP units were under the command and control of the Third United States Army during the nine-month deployment.

== Hurricane Katrina Relief ==
On 31 August 2005, "Task Force Delaware" composed of 153rd MPs and the Delaware Air National Guard's 166th Security Forces deployed to Gulfport, Mississippi in response to Hurricane Katrina. The joint task force operated 24-hour traffic control points, roving patrols, presence patrols, as well as conducting humanitarian operations in the Gulfport, Long Beach, Biloxi, and Pass Christian areas.

== Operation Iraqi Freedom ==
From 6 June 2007– 28 May 2008, the 153rd MP Company was deployed to Iraq. During the deployment the 153rd was attached to the HHC of the 18th Military Police Brigade, as well as administratively attached to the 720th Military Police Battalion. The company's main body was based out of Camp Liberty, and its 3rd Platoon element based out of FOB Kalsu, south of Baghdad. 3rd Platoon "Punishers" were under the tactical control of the 2nd Brigade, 3rd Infantry Division.

The 1st Platoon "Smokin' Aces" provided police training and health and welfare inspections at the Criminal Investigative Division Academy, and training the Protective Services Detail (PSD) of the CID Iraqi Commanding General. They conducted training classes on weapons safety, combat life saving techniques, vehicle searches, handcuffing, armed/unarmed self-defense, as well as personal search techniques. First Platoon also conducted the national level PTT mission at the CID Headquarters, and conducted combat patrols and PSD for the 89th and 18th Military Police Brigades.

Second Platoon "War Pigs" conducted force protection at the Iraqi Police academies at Fiji and Furat, and conducted one of the largest daylight logistics mission delivering donated Japanese motorcycles to the Iraqi Traffic Police. Second Platoon elements also conducted several humanitarian operations to local schools and medical centers.

The Operations Platoon "Blacksheep" operated a 24-hour tactical operations center (TOC), conducted combat patrols, and PTT missions to the prison at CID Headquarters. Operations Platoon elements were also detached to provide protective services for General Raymond T. Odierno, Commanding General, III Corps.

The 3rd Platoon element was fundamental in opening an IP station in Arab Jabour area, south of Baghdad. Third Platoon also conducted Sons of Iraq (SOI) training, recruitment, and provided medical assistance to local civilians.

== Afghanistan ==
In February 2013, the 153rd Military Police company deployed in support of Operation Enduring Freedom Afghanistan as a part of Combined Task Force Chesapeake headed by the 115th Military Police Battalion. The combined task force operated in Afghanistan's Kandahar Province. The unit headquartered at a small post called BP3, with a squad element as a protective security detail (PSD) at Camp Nathan Smith. Due to downgrade of Camp Nathan Smith the PSD element relocated to Forward Operating Base (FOB) Walton. The unit returned to the United States on 18 Sept. 2013.

== Unit decorations ==
Ribbon	Award	Year	Notes
	Delaware Governor's Meritorious Unit Award	2002–2003	For service in Saudi Arabia
	Delaware National Guard Unit Strength Award	2007–2008	For maintaining unit strength
	Meritorious Unit Commendation	2007–2008	Operation: Iraqi Freedom
	Superior Unit Award	2009	56th Presidential Inauguration

== Missions ==
Mission	Location	Year(s)
Panama	Panama Canal	1997–1998
Operation Roving Sands	Fort Bliss, Texas	1999
Operation Blue Crab	Aberdeen Proving Ground, MD	2000
Operation Enduring Freedom	Eskan Village, Saudi Arabia	2002–2003
Hurricane Katrina Relief	Gulfport, Mississippi	2005
Operation Jump Start	Ajo, Arizona	2007
Operation Iraqi Freedom	Baghdad, Iraq	2007–2008
56th Presidential Inauguration	Washington, D.C.	2009
Operation Enduring Freedom	Kandahar, Afghanistan	2013
58th Presidential Inauguration	Washington DC	2017
