= Delaware Army National Guard =

Component of the US Army and military of the state of Delaware

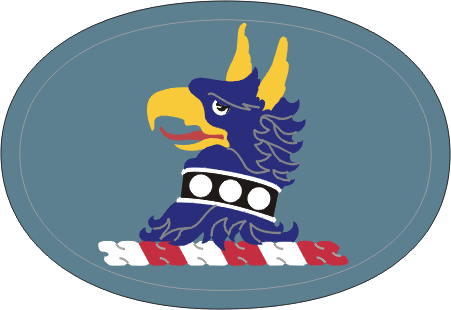
- Delaware ARNG Headquarters SSI
- Active: 1903-present
- Country: United States
- Allegiance: Delaware
- Branch: United States Army National Guard
- Type: ARNG Headquarters Command
- Part of: Delaware National Guard
- Garrison/HQ: Wilmington, Delaware

Commanders
- Current commander: Major General James A. Benson
- State Command Sergeant Major: Command Sergeant Major Michael Fields

Insignia
- Delaware National Guard Crest

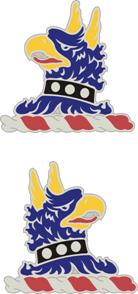
- Delaware ARNG Headquarters DUI

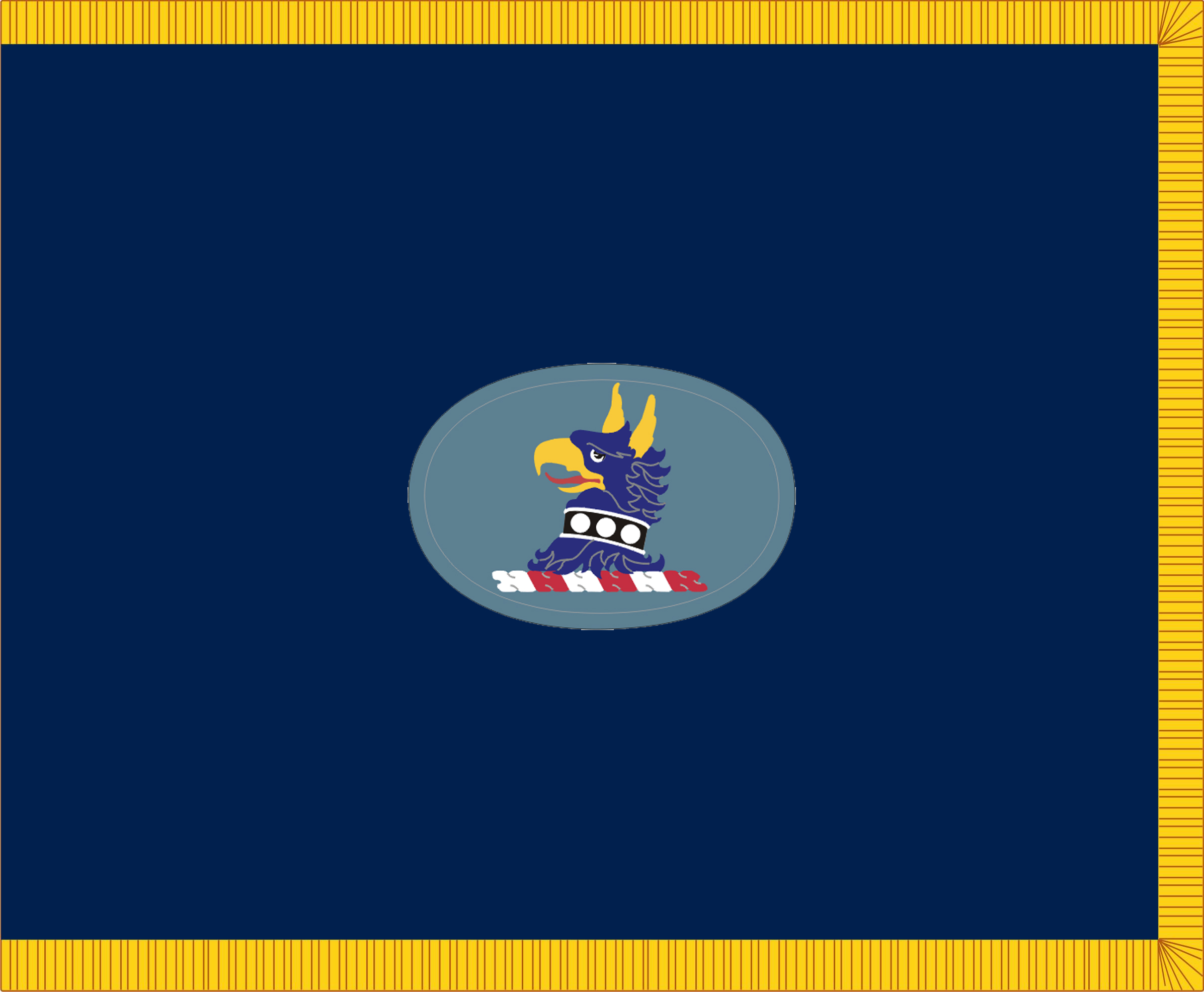
- Delaware ARNG Headquarters Flag

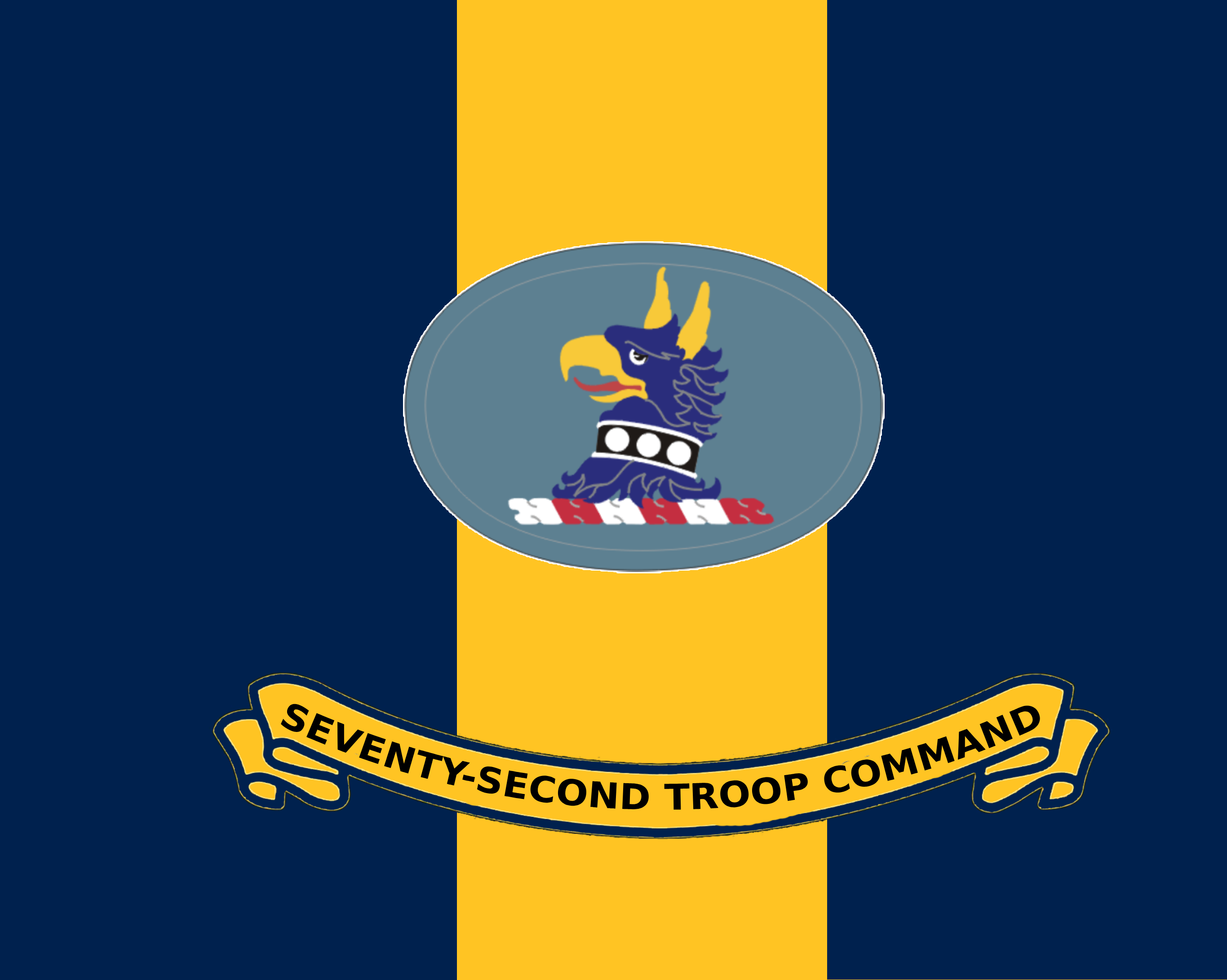
- Delaware ARNG 72nd Troop Command Flag

The Delaware Army National Guard is a component of the United States Army and the United States National Guard. National coordination of various state National Guard units are maintained through the National Guard Bureau.

Currently, the Delaware Army National Guard is composed of 1,654 guardsmen.

Delaware Army National Guard units are trained and equipped as part of the United States Army. The same ranks and insignia are used and National Guardsmen are eligible to receive all United States military awards. The Delaware Guard also bestows a number of state awards for local services rendered in or to the state of Delaware.

== History ==
The Delaware Army National Guard traces its origins back to August 31, 1655, when Swedish settlers were asked to take up arms to defend the colony against a Dutch attack on Fort Christina.

During the American Revolution, Delaware's First Regiment fought with General George Washington at the Battle of Long Island.

In the War of 1812 all Delaware volunteer units saw service at Lewes, where they comprised the bulk of force that drove off a British naval squadron seeking control of the Delaware River. The 198th Signal Battalion (DE ARNG), which traces its lineage to three militia units that were federalized during the War of 1812, is one of only nineteen Army National Guard units with campaign credit for the War of 1812.

In the Mexican War (1846–1847), the Federal Government would not accept volunteer companies but the Delaware volunteers were not content to stay home. After much red tape, a statewide composite unit was formed. They fought with distinction in the battles of Contreras, Cherubusco, Molino del Ray and Chapultepec where there were almost twice as many Delaware volunteers present as marines. The unit lost so many men in these actions it became known as "The Bloody 11th."

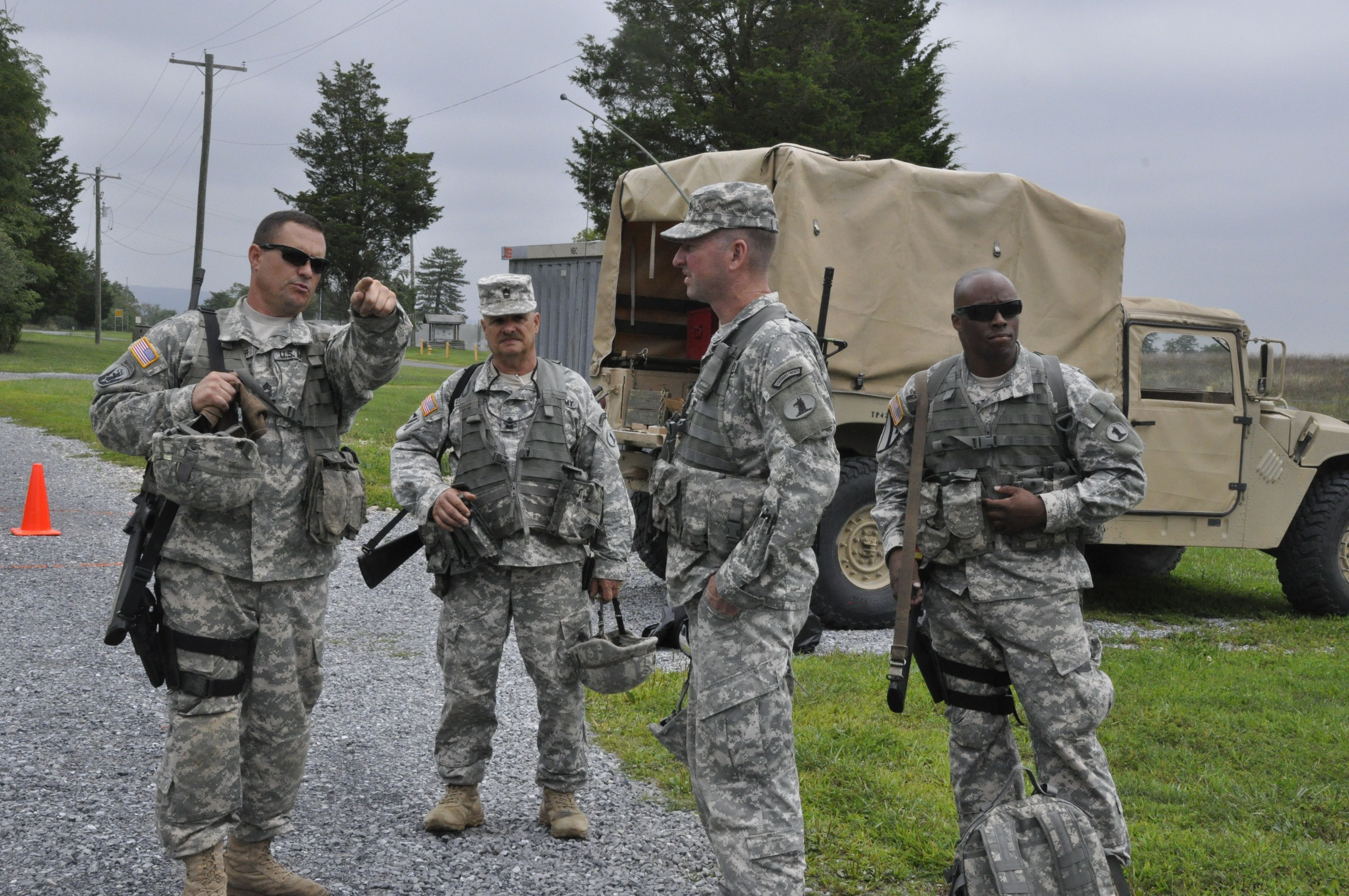
Delaware Army National Guardsmen planning their strategy during a marksmanship exercise

The Militia Act of 1903 organized the various state militias into the present National Guard system. One of the units formed since was the 198th Coast Artillery (AA), which traces its history to the three militia units referred to above. During this time, the Distinctive Insignia was designed and introduced. Designed by PVT T.S. Passwaters in 1905, the Distinctive Insignia depicts a crudely drawn Griffin, a nod to the rich history and tradition of the state of Delaware.

In response to the Wilmington riot of 1968, following the April 4 assassination of Martin Luther King Jr., Wilmington Mayor John Babiarz asked Governor Charles L. Terry Jr. for support from the National Guard. One week later, Mayor Babiarz requested the National Guard troops be withdrawn, but Governor Terry refused, and kept them in the city until his term ended in January, 1969. This is reportedly the longest occupation of an American city by state forces in the nation's history. In the aftermath of the occupation, recruiting offices of all military branches were removed from locations within the city limits until the early 2000s.

In the 1980s, aviation regiments began forming in both the regular Army and the National Guard. On 1 October 1986, the 44th Aviation Battalion was constituted in the Delaware and Illinois Army National Guard. It was concurrently organized from new and existing units with Headquarters at Peoria, Illinois. The 150th Aviation Regiment was created in Delaware from the 150th Aviation Battalion of the 50th Armored Division.

Following the terror attacks of September 11, 2001, numerous units of the Delaware Army National Guard have deployed to Saudi Arabia, Kuwait and Iraq in support of Operation Iraqi Freedom and Operation Enduring Freedom.

Troops from both the Delaware Army and Air National Guard volunteered to support disaster relief operations in Louisiana and Mississippi in the aftermath of Hurricane Katrina in 2005.

"Operation Arctic Vengeance I and II" saw over 300 DEARNG Soldiers volunteer to support the State of Emergency declared by Gov. Jack Markell following a pair of debilitating snowstorms from Feb. 7 through Feb. 12, 2010. DEARNG troops completed over 250 missions assisting local and state agencies with including Emergency Medical Services, fire calls, law enforcement, dialysis patient transport and civilian transport to warming stations.

National Guard units can be mobilized at any time by presidential order to supplement regular armed forces, and upon declaration of a state of emergency by the governor of the state in which they serve.

== Units c.2012 ==
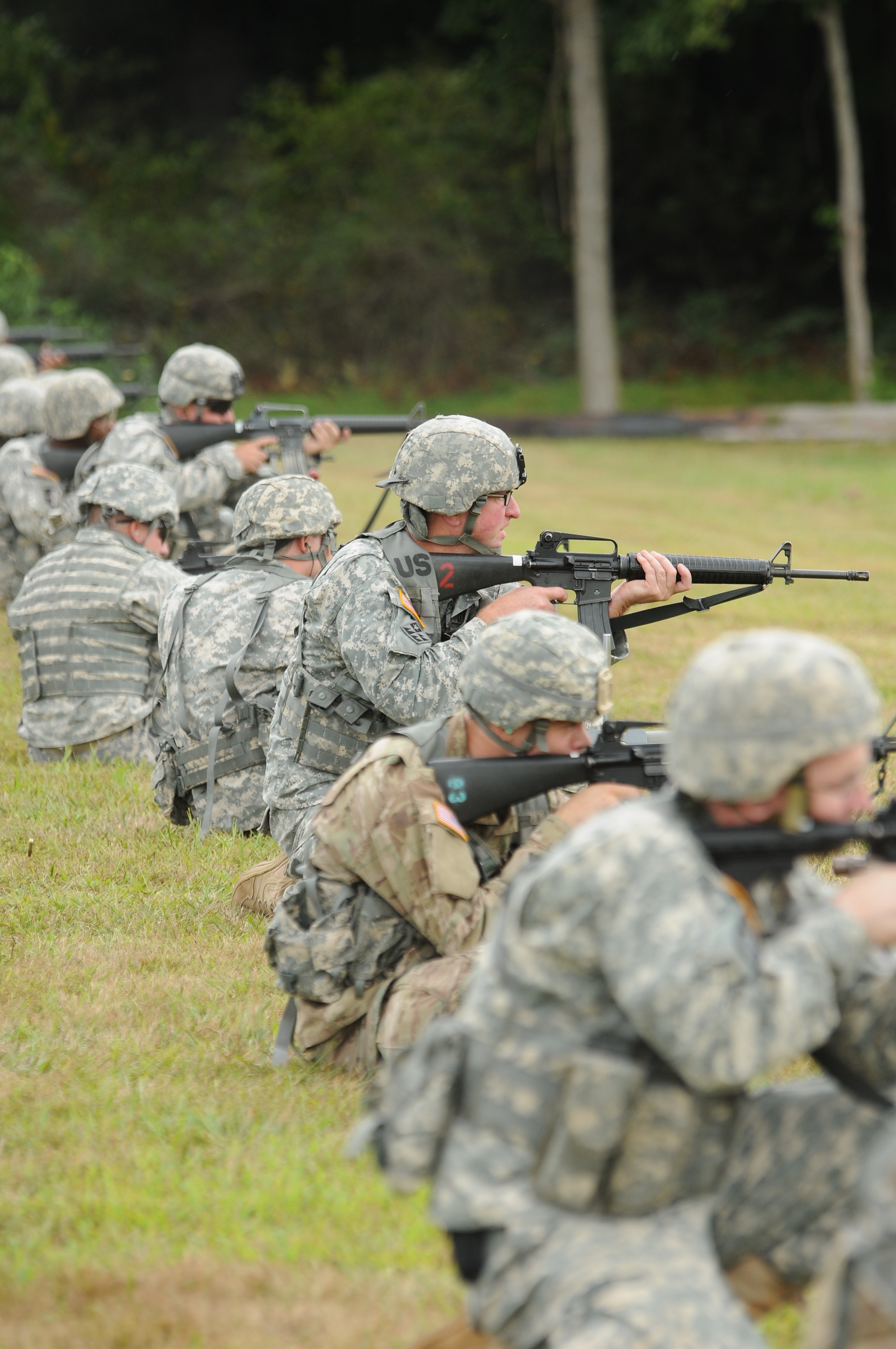
Delaware Army National Guardsmen competing in the Governor's Twenty marksmanship competition

- Joint Forces Headquarters - a Detachment-sized unit which comprises the Headquarters elements of both Army and Air National Guards for the state.
- 261st Theater Tactical Signal Brigade
  - Headquarters and Headquarters Company (HHC) - Deployed in support of Operation Iraqi Freedom at Camp Victory, Iraq from October 2008 through September 2009.
  - 198th Signal Battalion - deployed to Iraq in October 2006; scheduled 12-month deployment. Returned successfully and safely with numerous awards.
- 72nd Troop Command (Brigade)
  - Headquarters and Headquarters Detachment (HHD)
  - 721st Troop Command (Battalion)
    - Headquarters and Headquarters Detachment (HHD)
    - 262d Maintenance Company - Deployed to Iraq Summer of 2009 with a Convoy Security mission. Returned to Delaware and released from active duty April 18, 2010.
    - 160th Engineer Company - a platoon-sized element returned from a 14-month deployment in Iraq in November 2006.
    - 150th Engineer Detachment (formerly 249th Engineer Detachment) - 249th deployed to Iraq at the onset of Operation Iraqi Freedom, providing some of the first reconstruction efforts following the fall of the Hussein regime.
    - 1049th Transportation Company (formerly 945th Quartermaster Company) - 945th deployed in the early years of Operation Iraqi freedom. The unit trained in anticipation of deployment late in 2010.
  - 722d Troop Command (Battalion)
    - Headquarters and Headquarters Detachment (HHD)
    - 153d Military Police Company - Deployed to Saudi Arabia in 2002–2003 in support of Operation Enduring Freedom. Deployed to Iraq in support of OIF from June 2007 through May 2008. Deployed in support of Operation Enduring Freedom in 2013.
    - 287th Army Band
    - 3d Battalion (General Support), 238th Aviation Regiment
      - Company A (Command Aviation), 3d Battalion, 238th Aviation Regiment (formerly the 1st Battalion, 150th Aviation Regiment - Mobilized May 2004 Operation Iraq Freedom) - Mobilized November 2010 Afghanistan Operation Enduring Freedom XI, 2013 Kuwait Operation Enduring Freedom Kuwait.
      - Det 1, Headquarters Headquarters Company, 3d Battalion, 238th Aviation Regiment
      - Det 1, Company D, 3d Battalion, 238th Aviation Regiment
      - Det 1, Company E, 3d Battalion, 238th Aviation Regiment
    - 1st Battalion (General Support), 126th Aviation Regiment
      - Det 1 Company C, 1st Battalion (Medical Evacuation), 126th Aviation Regiment - Formerly the 121st Medical Company (Air Ambulance) - Mobilized for two years at Fort Lewis, WA. The 121st was one of the last Army Aviation units to fly the UH-1 Iroquois "Huey" helicopter.
      - Det 3, Company D, 1st Battalion (General Support), 126th Aviation Regiment
      - Det 3, Company E, 1st Battalion (General Support), 126th Aviation Regiment
    - 101st Public Affairs Detachment (formerly 444th Mobile Public Affairs Detachment) - Deployed to Germany for 6 months 1996; mobilized at Fort Dix, NJ February 2002 through September 2004.
  - 31st Civil Support Team (WMD)
  - 193d Regiment (Regional Training Institute) located at Bethany Beach Training Site, 193d RTI is the host of the state Officer Candidate School and Recruit Sustainment Program and has facilities to support a variety of training for both Army and Air National Guard units.
  - Embedded Training Team (ETT) - In addition to the above permanent units, an Embedded Training Team (ETT) consisting of eleven Delaware Army National Guard Soldiers from units all over the state mobilized for pre-deployment training in January 2010. The Delaware troops were joined by nine soldiers from the Vermont, Alabama, New Jersey and Puerto Rico National Guards and deployed to Afghanistan in the spring of 2010. The ETT's mission is to assist in training and mentoring Afghan National Army units and soldiers.

== See also ==
- Delaware State Guard
- Militia
- State Defense Forces
