= Delaware State Guard =

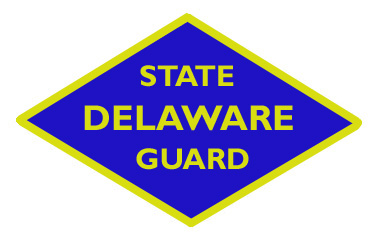
- Delaware State Guard insignia.
- Active: 1917–1919; 1941–1947
- Country: United States
- Allegiance: Delaware
- Branch: Army
- Type: State defense force
- Role: Military reserve force
- Size: 500
- Part of: Delaware Department of Military Affairs
- Garrison/HQ: Wilmington, Delaware

Commanders
- Governor of Delaware during World War I: Governor John G. Townsend, Jr.
- Governor of Delaware during World War II: Governor Walter W. Bacon
- Commanding Officer: Colonel J. Paul Heinel
- Executive Officer: Lt. Colonel Victor Clark

The Delaware State Guard is the currently inactive state defense force of the state of Delaware, which was active during both World War I and World War II. As the official militia of the state, the Delaware State Guard was created with the intent of acting as a stateside replacement for the Delaware National Guard while the National Guard units were deployed abroad.

== History of predecessor units ==
Prior to the Militia Act of 1903 and the subsequent creation of the National Guard of the United States, the United States maintained a small full-time, professional military and largely relied on state militias to provide for the nation's defense. These state militias would eventually evolve into the National Guard and their stateside parallels, the state defense forces, and both organizations trace their lineage directly to the state militias which operated prior to the creation of the modern-day National Guard.

The first militia in Delaware was formed when Swedish settlers took up arms to defend Fort Christina (which was at the time a Swedish settlement) against Dutch invaders. During the American Revolutionary War, Delaware raised several units of militia in support of the Patriot side of the war. In the War of 1812, all of the Delaware volunteer units saw combat at Lewes, where they comprised the majority of force that drove off a British naval squadron seeking control of the Delaware River. Despite the federal government initially prohibiting volunteer units the Mexican–American War, a volunteer unit raised in Delaware served in the battles of Contreras, Cherubusco, Molino del Rey, and Chapultepec, sustaining so many casualties that the unit was nicknamed "The Bloody 11th." During the American Civil War, Delaware would raise multiple units in support of the Union cause. These units would earn distinction in the battles of Fredericksburg, Chancellorsville, and Gettysburg. During the Spanish–American War, the 1st Delaware Volunteer Infantry was mustered into federal service but not deployed abroad. With the passage of the Militia Act of 1903, all state militia units were folded into the National Guard of the United States, largely turning the state militias from a state-funded and controlled force to a reserve component of the federal military.

== World War I ==
In response to the possibility that the states would prove vulnerable to invasion, insurrection, natural disasters, rioting, and other threats if the National Guard were to be federalized upon entry of the United States into World War I, Congress passed the Home Defense Act in June 1917 to allow the creation of state defense forces, or Home Guards. These units were solely funded and trained by the state, and could not be federalized or be deployed outside the state's borders. The Delaware Home Guard was created in February 1917 in order to assume the stateside duties of the Delaware National Guard during their deployment abroad. Under General Order #10, issued by Delaware's adjutant general, one infantry company and a supply detachment were created, consisting of four officers and seventy-one enlisted men. Prior to the passage of the National Security Act of 1920, whenever National Guard units were federalized, these National Guardsmen would be automatically discharged from the National Guard and reenlisted into federal service, and rather than being returned to the state's National Guard upon completion of enlistment they were instead discharged from the military altogether; therefore, in the aftermath of the war, the Home Guard was the only military force under Delaware's control until the reformation of the Delaware National Guard and dismissal of the Home Guard.

== World War II ==
In 1940, Section 61 of the National Defense Act of 1916 was modified to again allow the establishment of state defense forces. At the state level, the Delaware General Assembly passed legislation on April 14, 1941 "to provide for the Creation, Maintenance, Discipline, Legislation and Use of the Delaware State Guard" The Delaware State Guard was formed in May 1941 under control of Colonel J. Paul Heinel, a World War I veteran.

=== Training ===
Training and drills were conducted on a weekly basis, and during summer encampments where units would train together as a cohesive organization. The first field encampment was held at Fort DuPont from July 31 until August 8, 1943. Before organizing annual summer encampments, the commissioned officers and NCOs conducted training at St. Andrews School in Middletown, in August 1942, consisting of target practice, military tactics, and army regulations. Training for state guardsmen included practicing night patrols, firing Tommy guns, proper wear of gas masks, field exercises, learning the basics of modern warfare. They attended classes, watched training films on first aid, and practiced battle formations.

=== Membership ===
The Delaware State Guard began as one battalion, but through the war it grew to a regiment with two battalions numbering some 450–500 men with seven line companies of soldiers. Members were drawn from youth in high school who were too young to be inducted into the military, men who were too old to serve in the military, those of the draft age who were for any reason found unfit for federal duty, and men of the draft age who were waiting to be drafted.

=== Equipment ===
Initially, the Delaware State Guard received 300 1903 Model Springfield rifles from the War Department, though in May 1942 the War Department took back about 100 rifles and replaced them with repeater guard shotguns.

The personal equipment issued to every enlisted guardsmen and expected to be brought to training included: a coverall, issue shoes, a helmet liner, a gas mask, a water canteen, a web belt, a bayonet, a denim coat, trousers and a hat: a raincoat, a rifle, a waist belt, and a revolver. For non-commissioned officers, gear included a khaki cotton shirt, trousers, a tie, a cap, dress shoes, towels, a wash cloth, underwear, socks, a tooth brush and paste, a bathing suit, a shaving outfit, soap, shoe polish and a rag, a comb and brush, and a small mirror.

After the war, the Delaware State Guard received surplus equipment from the federal armed forces, including eight jeeps and an ambulance from Fort Dix, New Jersey in August 1945. Additionally, in June 1946, the State Guard received its own waveband from the FCC in order to provide radio communication among all the units in the state. Previously the State Guard had been forced to rely upon borrowed State Police radios for maneuvers and for radio cars.

=== Duties ===
As a state defense force, the Delaware State Guard served as internal troops who could be responsible for the stateside duties of the National Guard, including disaster relief, riot control, repelling an invasion, halting insurrection, and protecting infrastructure against sabotage. Guardsmen were expected to attend weekly training sessions as well as summer encampments for further training. Although the Guard never had to repel an invasion or quell a riot, units from the Guard were called up on June 10, 1945, when an Army Air Force plane crashed near Newark. The Guard was assigned to guard the wreckage until it was removed to New Castle Army Air Base.

== Disbandment ==
The Delaware State Guard was disbanded on January 3, 1947, at a public ceremony at the Wilmington Armory.

== Legal Status ==
State defense forces are permitted by the federal government under Title 32, Section 109 of the United States Code. Currently, 23 states and the territory of Puerto Rico take advantage of this legislation by maintaining active state defense forces. Delaware law also allows for the creation and maintenance of state defense forces by the governor of Delaware under Title 20, Chapter 3 of the Delaware Code. Given the legal framework at both state and federal level, it is possible for the Governor of Delaware to reactivate the Delaware State Guard.

== See also ==
- Naval militia
- Delaware Wing Civil Air Patrol
- United States Coast Guard Auxiliary
- List of United States militia units in the American Revolutionary War
