= 198th Signal Battalion =

198th Expeditionary Signal Battalion
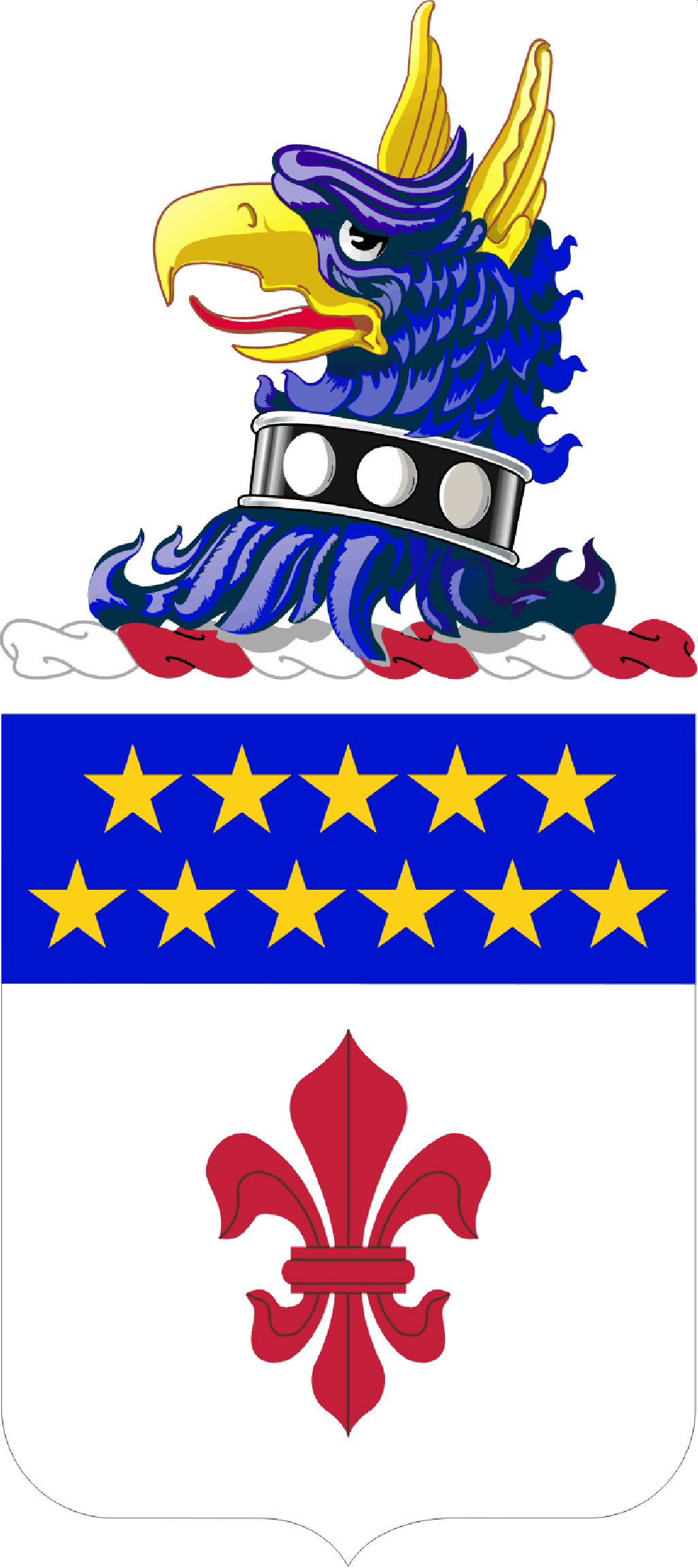
- Coat of arms
- Founded: 1775; 251 years ago
- Country: United States
- Branch: Delaware Army National Guard
- Type: Expeditionary Signal Battalion
- Role: Signal Corps
- Size: Battalion
- Garrison/HQ: Wilmington, Delaware
- Nickname: First Delaware
- Motto: "First Regiment of First State"
- Engagements: 36

Commanders
- Current commander: LTC Michael J. Jochen
- Notable commanders: Colonel John Haslet; Colonel David Hall

The 198th Signal Battalion is an Expeditionary Signal Battalion in the Delaware Army National Guard. Delaware is known as the "First State," as referenced in their motto "First Regiment of First State." The unit specializes in command post node communications, providing broadband satellite voice and data connections for brigade sized battlefield elements. The unit includes Headquarters, Headquarters Company located in Wilmington, DE; A Company in Georgetown, DE; B Company in Hodges, SC; and C Company in Wilmington, DE. It is one of several National Guard units with colonial roots and campaign credit for the War of 1812.

== History ==
The 1st Delaware Regiment was raised on 9 December 1775 for service with the continental army under the command of Colonel John Haslet. Over the next 240 years, the regiment would see action during the Revolutionary War, War of 1812, Civil War, World War I, World War II, and the Global War on Terrorism. Since its inception, the 198th has served as Infantry, Coast Artillery, Anti-Aircraft Artillery and Signal. The unit's lineage and honors include 36 battle streamers from nearly every major war in US history. Although many 198th Soldiers volunteered for service in Korea and Vietnam, the unit was activated in August 1950 for service during the Korean War. The unit was assigned in 1951 through 1952 to defend the Washington and Baltimore Air Defense sectors. During this assignment many of these men were "pipelined" to the Korean War. The unit also saw extensive deployments during World War I and World War II, and again in support of the Global War on Terrorism, most recently in 2013–2014 to Kandahar, Afghanistan. This marked the first time since the Civil War that the 198th deployed as a full Battalion with its South Carolina based B Company. To honor this event, the 198th's Headquarters facility on Kandahar Air Field was named "Camp Cowpens," after the Battle of Cowpens in South Carolina during the Revolutionary War.

== Lineage ==
Authorized 9 September 1775 in the Continental Army as the Delaware Regiment (also known as Haslet's Regiment)

Organized 13 January 1776 to consist of the following companies under the command of Colonel John Haslet:

Captain Joseph Stidham's Company – New Castle County
Captain Jonathan Caldwell's Company – Kent County
Captain David Hall's Company– Sussex County
Captain Henry Darby's Company – New Castle County
Captain Charles Pope's Company – Kent County
Captain Nathan Adams' Company – Kent County
Captain Samuel Smith's Company – New Castle County
Captain Joseph Vaughan's Company – Sussex County

Mustered into Continental Service 11 – 12 April 1776 at Dover and Lewistown

Reorganized 1 January 1777 as Colonel David Hall's Regiment as follows:

Captain John Patton's Company
Captain Robert Kirkwood's Company
Captain James Moore's Company
Captain Enoch Anderson's Company
Captain Thomas Holland's Company
Captain John Learmonth's Company
Captain Gord Hazzard's Company
Captain Peter Jaquett's Company

Reorganized September 1780 – August 1781 from new and existing companies as follows:

Captain Robert Kirkwood's Company
Captain Peter Jaquett's Company
Captain William McKennan's Company (mustered in August 1781 at Christiana Bridge)
Captain Paul Quenoualt's Company (mustered in August 1781 at Christiana Bridge)

Mustered out of Continental service 3 November 1783 at Christiana Bridge

Reorganized in Delaware as follows:
Light Infantry, 1st Regiment organized by 10 October 1793 at Wilmington, under the command of Captain David Bush

Mustered into federal service 23 May 1813 at Wilmington; mustered out of federal service 31 July 1813; mustered into federal service 28 August 1814; mustered out of federal service 3 January – 13 March 1815

Artillery Company, 2d Brigade – prior to 9 April 1793 at Dover, under the command of Captain Furbee
Mustered into federal service 23 May 1813 at Dover; mustered out of federal service 2 September 1814

1st Company, Light Infantry, 8th Regiment – prior to 22 February 1799 at Georgetown, under the command of Captain Benton Harris
Mustered into federal service 2 March 1813; mustered out of federal service 4 May 1813 at Lewes; mustered into federal service 6 May 1813; mustered out of federal service 31 July 1813; mustered into federal service 6 August 1814; mustered out of federal service 11 January 1815
Reorganized 6 March 1827 as the 1st Company of Light Infantry, 1st Battalion

Reorganized in 1831 as the Light Infantry Battalion, attached to the 8th Regiment of Delaware Militia, with companies as follows:

Georgetown Minute Men – organized 19 July 1831, Captain Edward L. Wells commanding
Volunteer Company, Light Infantry – organized 14 September 1831, Captain Coulter commanding
Volunteer Company, Light Infantry – organized 14 November 1831, Captain Thomas McIlwain Commanding
Volunteer Company, Light Infantry – organized 17 November 1831, Captain Gilley G. Short, commanding

Reorganized from 1849 to 1861 as separate companies as follows:

Kirkwood Rifle Corps – organized 30 June 1846 at Georgetown, Captain Caleb R. Layton, commanding; attached to the 13th Regiment of Militia
Company B, Artillery – organized 2 February 1849 at Wilmington; redesignated 29 February 1858 as the National Guards
Columbia Rifle Corps – organized prior to July 1858 at Wilmington

Companies A and B, Delaware Blues – organized prior to September 1860 as Bell and Everett Political Clubs
Union Volunteers – organized in 1861 at Camden
McLane Rifles – organized prior to 1861 at Wilmington

Reorganized 2–22 May 1861 as the 1st Delaware Volunteer Infantry Regiment and mustered into federal service at Wilmington; mustered out of federal service 2–26 August 1861

Reorganized 10 September-19 October 1861 and mustered into federal service for three years at Wilmington; mustered out of federal service 12 July 1865 near Munson's Hill, Virginia

Reorganized 4 April 1869 in the Delaware Volunteers as the 1st Zouave Regiment, with the organization of Company A (Smyth Zouaves)

Reorganized in 1880 in the Organized Militia of Delaware as the Regiment of Infantry

(Organized Militia of Delaware redesignated 17 April 1885 as the Delaware National Guard)

Mustered into federal service 9–19 May 1898 as the 1st Delaware Volunteer Infantry at Middletown; mustered out of federal service (less Companies A, B, G, and M) 16 November 1898 at Wilmington (Companies A, B, G, and M mustered out of federal service 19 December 1898 at Wilmington)

Reorganized during 1899–1900 in the Delaware National Guard as the 1st Infantry Regiment

Mustered into federal service 8–9 July 1916 at New Castle; mustered out of federal service 15–16 February 1917

Called into federal service 25 July 1917; drafted into federal service 5 August 1917

Regiment (less Headquarters elements and Companies A, D, and K) reorganized and redesignated 9–14 October 1917 as the 3d Battalion, 114th Infantry and assigned to the 29th Division

Reorganized and redesignated 27 February 1918 as the 59th Pioneer Infantry and relieved from assignment to the 29th Division

Demobilized (less Companies B, C, and D) 8 July 1919 at Camp Dix, New Jersey (Companies B, C, and D demobilized 7 August 1919 at Camp Upton, New York)

Reorganized and federally recognized 15 September 1921 in the Delaware National Guard as the 198th Artillery Regiment (Coast Artillery Corps), with headquarters at Wilmington, and the Separate Battalion, Coast Artillery, Delaware National Guard (see ANNEX 1)

198th Artillery (Coast Artillery Corps), redesignated 16 August 1924 as the 198th Coast Artillery

Inducted into federal service 16 September 1940 at Wilmington

(3d Battalion organized 1 January 1943 while in federal service)

Regiment broken up 1 March 1944 and its elements reorganized and redesignated as follows:

Headquarters and Headquarters Battery as Headquarters and Headquarters Battery, 198th Antiaircraft Artillery Group
Inactivated 24 December 1945 at Camp Anza, California
Reorganized and federally recognized 27 August 1946 at Wilmington
Location changed 13 January 1958 to New Castle

1st Battalion as the 736th Antiaircraft Artillery Gun Battalion
Inactivated 2 January 1946 at Camp Stoneman, California
Reorganized and federally recognized 16 October 1946 at Wilmington
Expanded 10 October 1949 to form the 736th Antiaircraft Artillery Gun Battalion and the 156th Antiaircraft Artillery Automatic Weapons Battalion

156th Antiaircraft Artillery Automatic Weapons Battalion redesignated 20 July 1951 as the 156th Antiaircraft Artillery Gun Battalion; on 1 October 1953 as the 156th Antiaircraft Artillery Battalion

736th Antiaircraft Artillery Gun Battalion ordered into active federal service 29 August 1950 at Wilmington; released from active federal service 2 August 1952 and reverted to state control Reorganized and redesignated 1 October 1953 as the 736th Antiaircraft Artillery Gun Battalion

2d Battalion as the 945th Antiaircraft Artillery Automatic Weapons Battalion
Inactivated 15 February 1946 at Hokkaido, Japan
Reorganized and federally recognized 17 October 1946 with headquarters at Dover
Redesignated 24 October 1949 as the 193d Antiaircraft Artillery Gun Battalion
Reorganized and redesignated 20 July 1951 as the 193d Antiaircraft Artillery Automatic Weapons Battalion
Redesignated 1 October 1953 as the 193d Antiaircraft Artillery Battalion

3d Battalion as the 373d Antiaircraft Artillery Battalion
Inactivated 29 December 1945 at Camp Stoneman, California
Consolidated 16 May 1946 with Headquarters and Headquarters Battery, 198th Antiaircraft Artillery Group

Headquarters and Headquarters Battery, 198th Antiaircraft Artillery Group, 736th, 156th, 193d, 280th (see ANNEX 1), and 945th (organized 20 November 1956) Antiaircraft Artillery Battalions consolidated 1 April 1959 to form the 198th Artillery, a parent regiment under the Combat Arms Regimental System, to consist of the 1st, 2d, 4th, and 5th Gun Battalions, the 3d Automatic Weapons Battalion, and the 6th Detachment

Reorganized 1 April 1962 to consists of the 1st, 2d, 3d, 4th, and 5th Automatic Weapons Battalions and the 6th Detachment

Reorganized 1 May 1963 to consist of the 1st, 2d, 3d, and 4th Automatic Weapons Battalions and the 6th Detachment

Reorganized 31 January 1968 to consist of the 1st, 2d, and 3d Battalions

Regiment broken up 1 January 1970 and its elements reorganized and redesignated as follows:

1st and 2d Battalions consolidated to form the 198th Signal Battalion
Headquarters and Headquarters Battery, 3d Battalion as Headquarters and Headquarters Detachment, 198th Transportation Battalion (see ANNEX 2)
(remainder of 3d Battalion – hereafter separate lineage)

Reorganized and redesignated 1 April 1979 as the 198th Signal Battalion

(Federal recognition withdrawn 15 April 1989 from Company B, 198th Signal Battalion)

Reorganized and redesignated 1 September 1990 as Headquarters and Headquarters Detachment, 198th Signal Battalion (Companies A and C concurrently reorganized as Companies C and B, 242d Signal Battalion - hereafter separate lineages)

Ordered into active federal service 28 July 2006 at Wilmington; released from active federal service 23 January 2008 and reverted to state control

Consolidated 1 September 2007 with the 280th Signal Battalion (see ANNEX 2), and consolidated unit reorganized in the Delaware and South Carolina Army National Guard as the 198th Signal Battalion

Ordered into active federal service 9 April 2013 at home stations; released from active federal service 13 May 2014 and reverted to state control

ANNEX 1

Organized 16 November 1920 in the Delaware National Guard from former elements of the 1st Infantry as the 1st Separate Battalion, Coast Artillery

Reorganized and redesignated 10 July 1925 as the 261st Coast Artillery Battalion

Expanded and reorganized 15 April 1940 to form the 261st Coast Artillery Regiment (2nd Battalion allotted to the New Jersey National Guard)

Inducted into federal service 27 January 1941 at home stations; concurrently, regiment broken up and its elements reorganized and redesignated as follows:

Headquarters and Headquarters Battery, and 1st Battalion as the 261st Coast Artillery Battalion at Georgetown, Delaware. Moved to Fort DuPont, Delaware January 1941. Elements deployed to Fort Miles, Delaware 5 June 1941. This unit served as the National Guard component of the Harbor Defenses of the Delaware, principally at Fort Miles, Delaware.

2nd Battalion as the 122nd Coast Artillery Battalion (AA) (hereafter separate lineage)

261st Coast Artillery Battalion disbanded 1 October 1944 and remaining personnel transferred to the 21st Coast Artillery Battalion

21st Coast Artillery Battalion inactivated 1 April 1945 at Fort Miles, Delaware

Reconstituted 25 August 1945 and allotted to the Delaware National Guard

Reorganized, redesignated federally recognized 24 October 1949 as the 945th Antiaircraft Artillery Automatic Weapons Battalion with headquarters at Georgetown

Redesignated 1 October 1953 as the 945th Antiaircraft Artillery Battalion

Reorganized and redesignated 20 November 1956 as the 280th Antiaircraft Artillery Automatic Weapons Battalion

ANNEX 2

Organized 1 January 1970 in the Delaware Army National Guard at Milford as Headquarters and Headquarters Detachment, 198th Transportation Battalion

Converted and redesignated 1 November 1971 as Headquarters and Headquarters Detachment, 280th Signal Battalion

Location changed 1 June 1974 to Georgetown

Reorganized 1 April 1979 as the 280th Signal Battalion, with headquarters at Georgetown

Reorganized 1 September 1993 in the Delaware and Connecticut Army National Guard with headquarters at Georgetown

HOME AREA: Delaware (less Company B at Abbeville, South Carolina)

== Distinctive unit insignia ==
- Description

A gold color metal and enamel insignia 1 1/16 inches (2.7 cm) in height overall consisting of the shield and motto of the coat of arms.

- Symbolism

The shield is white, the old color of Infantry. The eleven mullets represent the eleven battles and campaigns in which the organization served during the Civil War, and the red fleur-de-lis is for World War I service. The red is also the color of the Coast Artillery.

- Background

The distinctive unit insignia was originally approved for the 198th Coast Artillery on 13 Jun 1934. It was redesignated for the 736th Antiaircraft Artillery Gun Battalion on 26 Jan 1951. On 6 Apr 1961, the insignia was redesignated for 198th Artillery. The distinctive unit insignia was redesignated for the 198th Signal Battalion on 19 Oct 1978.

== Coat of arms ==
=== Blazon ===
- Shield

Argent, a fleur-de-lis Gules; on a chief Azure eleven mullets, a row of five above a row of six.

- Crest

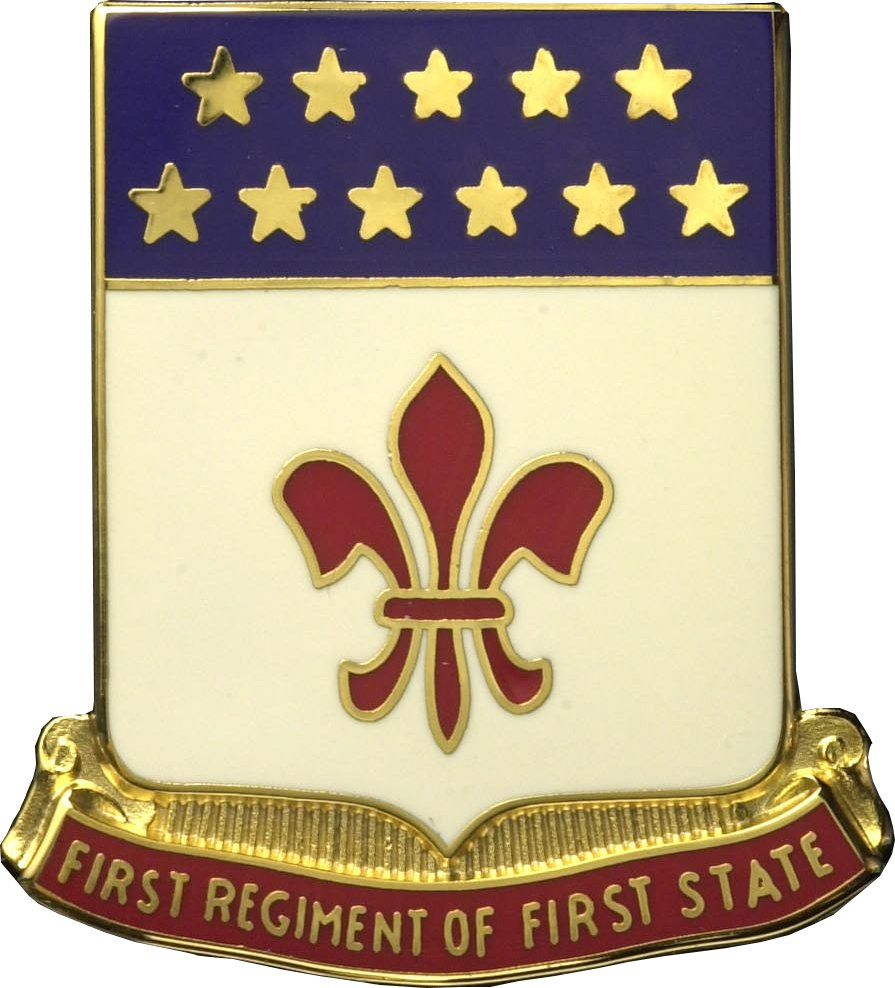
198th ESB Coat of Arms

That for the regiments and separate battalion of the Delaware National Guard: On a wreath of the colors, Argent and Gules, a griffin's head erased Azure eared and beaked Or, langued Gules, collared Sable, fimbriated Argent and thereon three plates. Motto FIRST REGIMENT OF FIRST STATE

=== Symbolism ===
The shield is white, the old color of Infantry. The eleven mullets represent the eleven battles and campaigns in which the organization served during the Civil War, and the red fleur-de-lis is for World War I service. The red is also the color of the Coast Artillery.

=== Background ===
The coat of arms was originally approved for the 198th Coast Artillery on 19 Jun 1933. It was redesignated for the 736th Antiaircraft Artillery Gun Battalion on 26 Jan 1951. On 6 Apr 1961, the insignia was redesignated for 198th Artillery. The coat of arms was redesignated for the 198th Signal Battalion on 19 Oct 1978.

== Campaign streamers ==
Revolutionary War

- Long Island
- Trenton
- Princeton
- Brandywine
- Germantown
- Monmouth
- Yorktown
- Cowpens
- Guilford Court House
- New York 1776
- New York 1777
- South Carolina 1780
- South Carolina 1781
- North Carolina 1781
- South Carolina 1782

War of 1812

- Delaware 1813
- Delaware 1814
- Delaware 1815

Civil War

- Peninsula
- Antietam
- Fredericksburg
- Chancellorsville
- Gettysburg
- Wilderness
- Spotsylvania
- Cold Harbor
- Petersburg
- Appomattox
- Virginia 1863

World War I

- Meuse-Argonne

World War II

- Northern Solomons (w/ Arrowhead)
- Leyte
- Luzon

Operation Enduring Freedom

Iraq
- National Resolution
- Iraqi Surge
Afghanistan:
- Transition 1 (pending HRC/CMH approval)

== Decorations ==
- Philippine Presidential Unit Citation, Streamer embroidered 17 OCTOBER 1944 to 4 JULY 1945
- Meritorious Unit Commendation (Army), Streamer embroidered IRAQ 2006-2007
- Meritorious Unit Commendation (Army), Streamer embroidered AFGHANISTAN 2013-2014

== See also ==
- Fort Miles
- 261st Theater Tactical Signal Brigade (United States)
- Francis D. Vavala
- Battle of Cowpens
- 1st Delaware Infantry Regiment – American Civil War unit
