= Recruit Sustainment Program =

Recruit Sustainment Program (RSP) is a program of the United States Army National Guard designed to introduce new recruits to the fundamentals of the U.S. Army before they leave to basic combat training (BCT) and advanced individual training (AIT). The motto is "Paratus Preliator" (prepared warrior).

The program is based on the three traits of combat which include being mentally prepared, administratively correct and physically fit, along with the seven Army Values signified by the acronym LDRSHIP (loyalty, duty, respect, selfless service, honor, integrity and personal courage).

RSP includes five phases. These include:

- Red phase, which covers the recruit's first drill
- White phase, from their second drill to the drill one month before shipping to BCT
- Blue phase, the last drill before BCT
- Green phase, for recruits that have completed BCT and are awaiting AIT or who have enlisted under high school programs that require them to finish their senior year
- Gold phase, soldiers who have completed both BCT and AIT and covers their last drill before reporting to their home unit.

While at RSP, recruits do physical training to prepare for the rigors of BCT. Initially this includes the OPAT test, which consists of a standing long jump, seated power throw, deadlift, and shuttle run. After completion of BCT (green phase), recruits complete a standard Army Combat Fitness Test (ACFT). Generally, RSP recruits undergo an ACFT at every drill except for those in gold phase.

All new recruits receive the "Soldier's Blue Book". This book includes information required to be successful while attending RSP. This includes the Army Core Values, military time, rank structure, the history of the hand salute, General Orders for Sentries, and other relevant information.

The Red Phase consists of weekends being spent in a classroom covering the most important basic subjects that new recruits need to know such as rank and insignia recognition, reporting procedures, and Army structure.

Stripes for Skills often takes place during the second drill allows especially knowledgeable recruits to receive early promotions in rank (stripes) based on the demonstration of the skills that they already have. These classes are often more hands on, and typically include topics such as first aid, map reading, and drill and ceremony (D&C).

Following the second drill (the remainder of white phase) hands on training may occur. This involves more in-depth training in D&C, and weapon-handling. Recruits may learn drills like combat formations and operations using "rubber ducks" (fake rubber weapons meant to feel like their real counterpart).

Blue phase is the last drill before a recruit leaves for BCT, and typically includes inspirational Q&A with green and gold phase recruits about what to expect. Blue phase is the "crash course" of everything about basic training that might have been missed or neglected in earlier phases.

In September 2025, the recruiting goal for the 2025 fiscal year was exceed with record numbers of military recruiting. The Air National Guard and the Army National Guard enlisted 50,000 new members.
