= 261st Theater Tactical Signal Brigade =

- Shoulder sleeve insignia
- Country: United States
- Branch: United States Army National Guard
- Type: Communications
- Role: Command and control communications
- Size: Brigade
- Part of: Delaware Army National Guard
- Garrison/HQ: Smyrna, Delaware
- Nickname: The Diamond Brigade
- Motto: "Make it Happen!"
- Colors: Orange, White, Blue and Buff
- Engagements: Operation Iraqi Freedom

Insignia
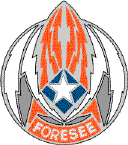
- Distinctive unit insignia

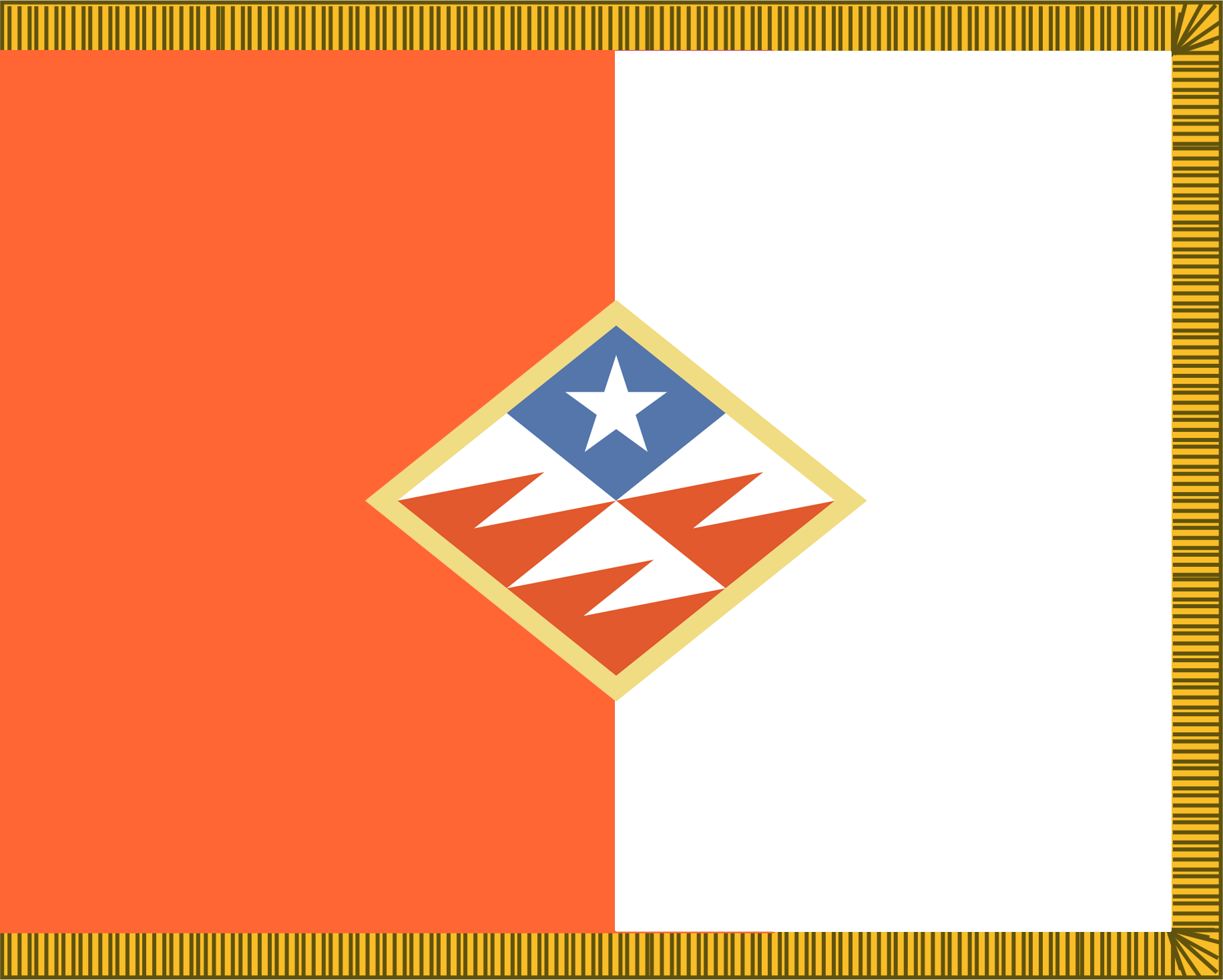
- 261st Signal Brigade Flag

The 261st Theater Tactical Signal Brigade (261st TTSB) is a unit in the Delaware Army National Guard, with a home station in Smyrna, Delaware. The 261st Theater Tactical Signal Brigade (261st TTSB) provides command and control to assigned and attached units. The 261st Signal Brigade supervises the installation, operation, and maintenance of up to 16 NODES in the theater communications system excluding the division and corps systems. The brigade also hosts a Joint Command, Control, Computer and Communications (C4) Center, or JCCC, at its headquarters in Smyrna, Delaware.

== Mission ==
The 261st Theater Tactical Signal Brigade (261st TTSB) provides command and control to assigned and attached units. The 261st Signal Brigade supervises the installation, operation, and maintenance of up to 16 NODES in the theater communications system excluding the division and corps systems. The HHC, 261st Theater Tactical Signal Brigade is employed to command and control echelons above corps (EAC) tactical signal battalions, theater strategic organizations, and separate companies as required to support theater communications networks.

== Subordinate units ==
One battalion currently falls under command of 261st Signal Brigade:

- 198th Signal Battalion (198th SB)
  - Headquarters Company
  - Alpha Company
  - Bravo Company
  - Charlie Company

The 198th Signal Battalion provides command, control, and supervision of organic and assigned units, and provides nodal and extension communications support for the Combatant Commanders of unified or specified commands, Army Service Component Commanders (ASCC), or Joint Task Force/Joint Forces Land Component Commands (JTF/JFLCC). 198th Deployed to Camp Cropper, Iraq.

The 198th traces its lineage all the way back to the Revolution, to Colonel John Haslet's 1st Delaware Regiment which was formed 21 January 1776. The regiment was a significant contributor at the Battle of Cowpens on 17 January 1781. The battalion also served at Fort Miles as the 198th Coastal Artillery Battalion during World War 2.

Former subordinate Units:

- 280th Signal Battalion, The 280th mobilized at Dover Air Force Base to supplement the base security squadron from January 2003 through December 2004. The battalion was inactivated and its assets were incorporated into the 198th.

== History ==
The 261st Signal Brigade began its lineage in 1943 in the Army of the United States as the Headquarters and Headquarters Battery, 68th Antiaircraft Artillery Brigade, activated in New Caledonia. After the war, the unit was allotted to the National Guard as the 261st Antiaircraft Artillery Brigade.

The modern 261st TTSB is a mobile force able to rapidly deploy, supporting both state and federal missions. The 261st served a 10-month tour at Camp Victory, Iraq managing communications in support of Operation Iraqi Freedom and returned to Delaware 2 October 2009.

The 261st returned to drill status in March 2010. Col. David A. Passwaters III took command of the unit in a ceremony 6 March at Smyrna Readiness Center. The next day, outgoing commander Brig. Gen. Scott E. Chambers was installed as Deputy Adjutant General for the entire Delaware Army National Guard.

== Lineage and honors ==
- Constituted 25 February 1943 in the Army of the United States as Headquarters and Headquarters Battery, 68th Antiaircraft Artillery Brigade (Activated 10 August 1943 at New Caledonia)
- Inactivated 28 February 1946 in Japan
- Redesignated 16 May 1946 as Headquarters and Headquarters Battery, 261st Antiaircraft Artillery Brigade and allotted to the Delaware National Guard
- Organized and federally recognized 5 December 1949 at Wilmington
- Redesignated 1 April 1959 as Headquarters and Headquarters Battery, 261st Artillery Brigade
- (Location change 31 January 1968 to Dover, Delaware)
- Converted and redesignated 1 January 1970 as Headquarters and Headquarters Company, 261st Signal Command
- Reorganized and redesignated 1 June 1971 as Headquarters and Headquarters Company, 261st United States Army Strategic Communications Command
- Reorganized and redesignated 1 July 1974 as Headquarters and Headquarters Company 261st Signal Command
- Redesignated 1 September 1996 as Headquarters and Headquarters Company 261st Signal Brigade
- (Location change 2003 to Smyrna, Delaware)
- Adopted the Joint C4 Coordination Center (JCCC) in 2006

== Insignia ==
=== Shoulder sleeve insignia ===
Description: A lozenge with horizontal axis 3 3/8 inches (8.6 cm) overall and vertical axis 2 3/4 inches (7.0 cm) overall consisting of four lozenges conjoined, the upper of colonial blue and bearing a white five pointed star and each of the remaining three divided into white and orange areas by a zig-zag partition line, all within a 1/8 inch (0.32 cm) buff border. It has Velcro on the back so it sticks to a uniform.

Symbolism: Orange and white are the colors used by Signal units. Colonial blue and buff were suggested by the flag of the state of Delaware. The single star alludes to Delaware as the "first state" to sign the Constitution; it is also used to indicate the capital city of Dover, the unit's home area. The pattern formed by the conjoined lozenges is indicative of precise planning and represents the unit's capabilities. The white and orange zig-zag simulates electric flashes and refers to the technology of a communications system and the unit's mission.

Background: The shoulder sleeve insignia was originally approved for 261st Signal Command on 7 January 1971. It was amended on 27 January 1971 to correct the description of the insignia. On 19 January 1972 the insignia was redesignated for the 261st U.S. Army Strategic Communications Command. It was redesignated on 4 December 1974 for the 261st Signal Command. The shoulder sleeve insignia was redesignated for the 261st Signal Brigade on 1 September 1996.

=== Distinctive unit insignia ===
Description: A silver color metal and enamel device 1 3/16 inches (3.0 cm) in height overall consisting of four orange lightning flashes issuing vertically from a blue lozenge charged with a white star between four white vertical arcing lightning bolts, all above an orange scroll inscribed "FORESEE" in silver letters.

Symbolism: Orange and white are the traditional colors of the Signal Corps. The four white electronic flashes represent command and control, communications and computers, the four "C's" of a modern military Signal organization. The diamond shape and blue color refer to the Delaware State flag, and the star refers to Dover, the state capital and the unit's home area. The orange flashes represent the unit's mission to disseminate and direct communication efforts over a wide area.

Background: The distinctive unit insignia was originally approved for the 261st Signal Command on 31 August 1979. It was redesignated for the 261st Signal Brigade on 1 September 1996.

== Operation Iraqi Freedom ==
Headquarters and Headquarters Company (HHC), 261st TTSB was activated for federal service in support of Operation Iraqi Freedom on 1 October 2008. The unit conducted pre-mobilization training at Fort Bliss, Texas and formally accepted the tactical signal mission for the Iraqi Theater of Operations from 11th Signal Brigade on 20 December. During the deployment, 261st was the headquarters element of "Task Force Diamond", with command and control over the 146th Expeditionary Signal Battalion of the Florida Army National Guard, and the 51st Expeditionary Signal Battalion from Fort Lewis, WA. The Task Force had personnel and equipment assets at over 50 locations throughout the Iraqi Theater of Operations. 261st transferred authority for the Theater signal mission to the 35th Signal Brigade in mid-September and returned home to Delaware on 1 October 2009. On 11 July 2010, the unit received the Meritorious Unit Commendation for its outstanding service during the deployment.

== See also ==
- Francis D. Vavala
- 198th Signal Battalion (United States)
