= 166th Airlift Wing =

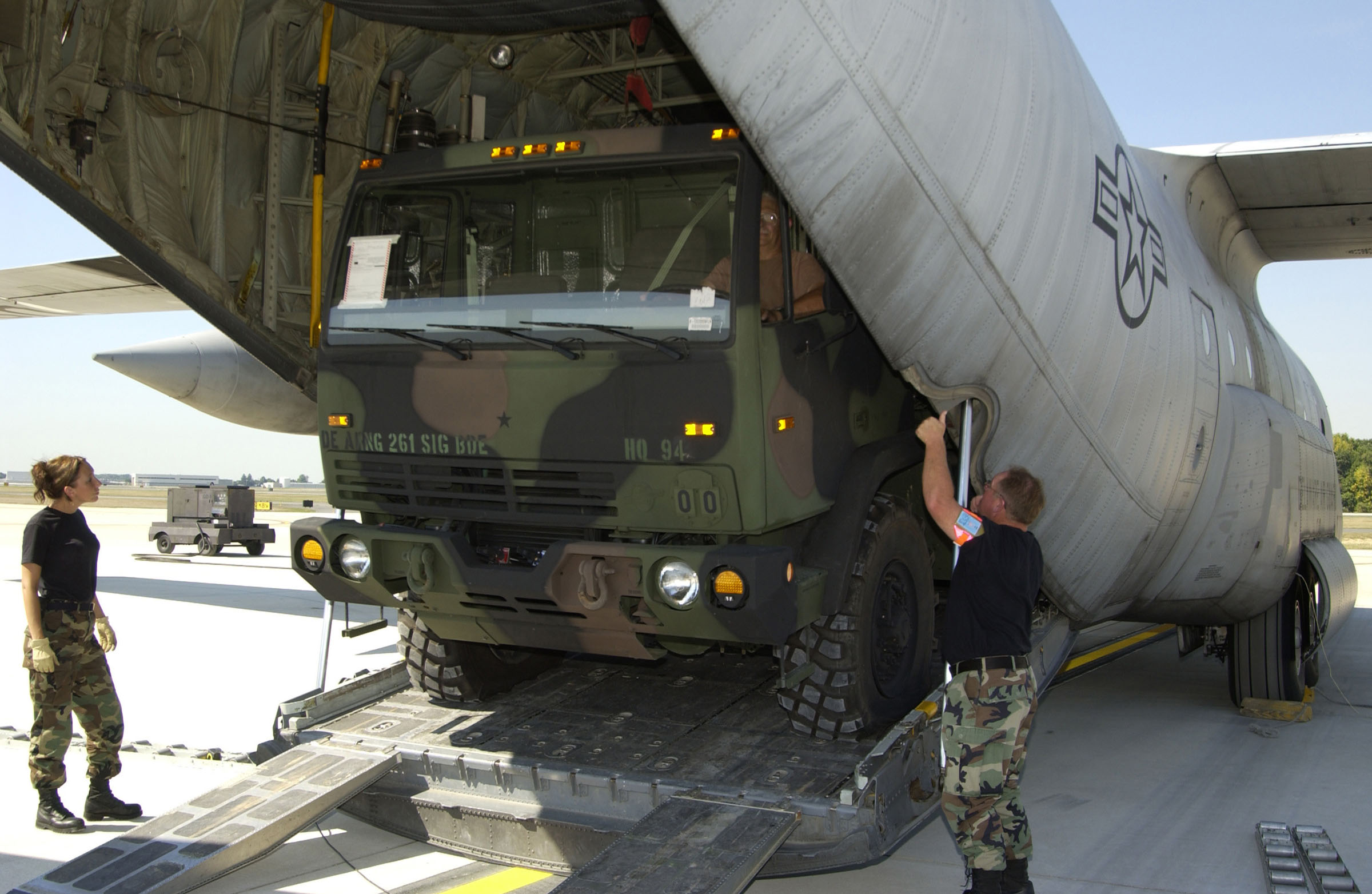
- Delaware Guardsmen load an M-1083 Tactical Vehicle onto a C-130 Hercules for deployment to New Orleans in support of Hurricane Katrina relief efforts.
- Active: 7 April 1962-Present
- Country: United States
- Allegiance: Delaware
- Branch: Air National Guard
- Type: Wing
- Role: Airlift
- Part of: Delaware Air National Guard
- Garrison/HQ: New Castle County Airport, Delaware

Insignia
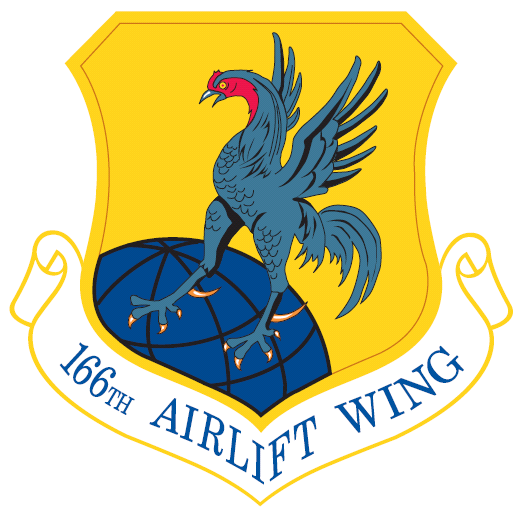
- 166th Airlift Wing emblem

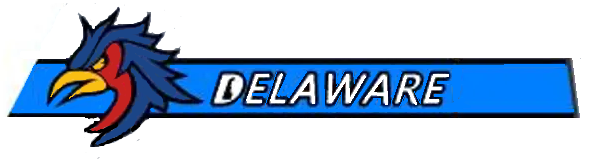
- Tail stripe: The First State

The 166th Airlift Wing of the Delaware Air National Guard is stationed at New Castle Air National Guard Base, Delaware. If activated to federal service, the Wing is gained by the United States Air Force Air Mobility Command.

== Mission ==
The 166th Airlift Wingthe wing provides the U.S. Air Force with airlift, airdrop capability of paratroops and cargo, and aeromedical evacuation of patients anywhere in the world. Additionally, the wing has a civil engineer function and a network warfare unit (the 166th Network Warfare Squadron). Under command of the Governor of Delaware, the wing is prepared to support the State of Delaware with trained personnel and equipment for various humanitarian missions to protect life and property and to preserve peace, order and public safety. The wing's gaining command is the Air Mobility Command, U.S. Air Force.

== Units ==
The 166th Airlift Wing consists of the following units:

- 166th Operations Group

142d Airlift Squadron
142d Aeromedical Evacuation Squadron
166th Operations Support Squadron
166th Cyberspace Operations Squadron

- 166th Maintenance Group

166th Aircraft Maintenance Squadron
166th Maintenance Squadron
166th Maintenance Operations Flight

- 166th Mission Support Group

166th Civil Engineer Squadron
166th Communications Flight
166th Force Support Squadron
166th Logistics Readiness Squadron
166th Security Forces Squadron

- 166th Medical Group

== History ==
On 7 April 1962 the Delaware Air National Guard, with the 142nd Tactical Fighter Squadron, enlarged to group status as the 166th Air Transport Group and then was reassigned from the Tactical Air Command to the Military Air Transport Service. The Delaware Air National Guard gave up its North American F-86 Sabres for the four engine Boeing C-97 Stratofreighter cargo planes.

Dr. Harold Brown, Secretary of the Air Force, announced that effective 1 January 1966, the Military Air Transport Service would be redesignated as the Military Airlift Command. In addition to the name change certain Air National Guard units were also redesignated, including Delaware's. The unit was named the 166th Military Airlift Group.

During the period from 1969 to 1971 the Delaware Air National Guard flew missions to Vietnam.

On 9 April 1968, the Delaware Air National Guard was called to state duty to quell civil disturbance and violence in the city of Wilmington, Delaware. The unit was released from state duty after several weeks. However, many individuals remained on state duty through 20 January 1969.

On 12 May 1971 the Delaware ANG changed its name to the 166th Tactical Airlift Group and replaced its C-97s with Lockheed C-130A Hercules turboprop cargo planes, and began transition from the Military Airlift Command to the Tactical Air Command.

On 16 October 1985, the Delaware Air National Guard began replacing its aging C-130As with the delivery of a brand new factory fresh C-130H. The last new C-130H aircraft arrived in January 1986.

On 25 January 1991 selected units of the Delaware Air National Guard were activated for the Persian Gulf War known as Operation Desert Storm. A majority of the unit was stationed at Al Kharj Air Base, Saudi Arabia. Over 150 personnel deployed to six other locations in Europe and two stateside bases. The 166th Civil Engineer Squadron voluntarily deployed to Dover Air Force Base, Delaware and performed the monumental accomplishment of enlarging Dover's Mortuary capacity - the assignment was completed in a record 23 days. On 30 June 1991 the units/personnel were released from active duty performed in support of the Persian Gulf War.

Another name change occurred on 16 March 1992, with the group being redesignated the 166th Airlift Group. In 1993 an Air Force reorganization placed the 166th under Air Combat Command if called to active duty.

On 1 October 1995, the group was renamed the 166th Airlift Wing and was gained by the Air Mobility Command.

In 2021, the unit's 1984 C-130H2 aircraft departed and the wing received newer 1991 C-130H2.5 aircraft.

=== Lineage ===
- Established as the 166th Air Transport Group, Heavy on 13 March 1961

Activated on 7 April 1962
Redesignated 166th Military Airlift Group on 8 January 1966
Redesignated 166th Tactical Airlift Group on 12 May 1971
Redesignated 166th Airlift Group on 1 June 1992
Redesignated 166th Airlift Wing on 10 January 1995

=== Assignments ===
- Delaware Air National Guard, 7 April 1962

Gained by: Military Air Transport Service
Gained by: Military Airlift Command, 8 January 1966

- 118th Tactical Airlift Wing, 12 May 1971 – 10 January 1995
- Delaware Air National Guard, 10 January 1995

Gained by: Air Mobility Command

=== Stations ===
- New Castle County Airport, Delaware, 7 April 1962

=== Aircraft ===
- C-97 Stratocruiser, 1962-1971
- C-130 Hercules, 1971–Present

== See also ==
- Delaware Air National Guard
- Hugh T. Broomall
- Francis D. Vavala
