= 142nd Airlift Squadron =

142d Airlift Squadron
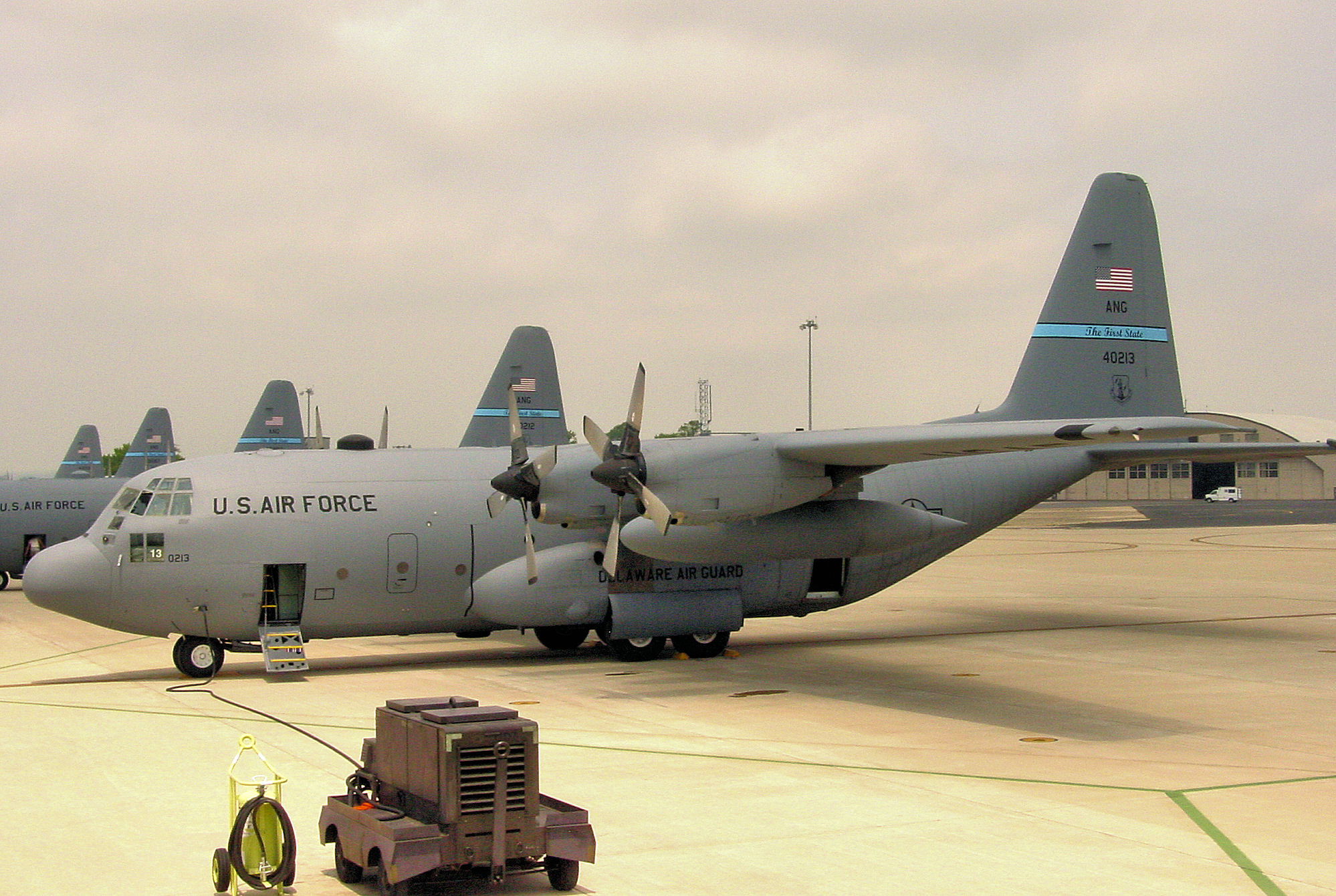
- 142d Airlift Squadron C-130s at New Castle ANG Base (Note: Aircraft 40213 passed the 10,000 flying hour milestone on 5 June 2008, becoming the first C-130 aircraft in the unit to pass this mark.)
- Active: 1942–1946; 1946–1952; 1952–present
- Country: United States
- Allegiance: Delaware
- Branch: Air National Guard
- Type: Squadron
- Role: Airlift
- Part of: Delaware Air National Guard
- Garrison/HQ: New Castle Air National Guard Base, Delaware
- Engagements: Southwest Pacific Theater
- Decorations: Distinguished Unit Citation; Air Force Outstanding Unit Award; Philippine Presidential Unit Citation

Insignia
- 142d Airlift Squadron emblem

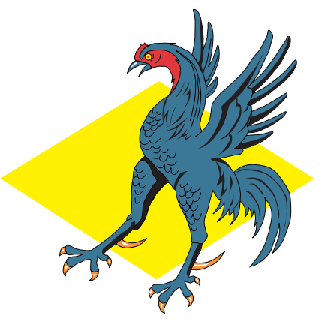
- 142d Tactical Fighter Squadron emblem

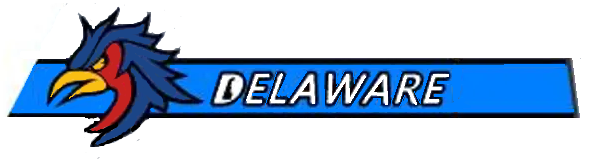
- Tail stripe

The 142nd Airlift Squadron) is a unit of the Delaware Air National Guard 166th Airlift Wing located at New Castle Air National Guard Base, Delaware. It is equipped with the C-130H Hercules.

== Mission ==
The mission of the 142nd Airlift Squadron is to provide combat ready aircrew for state, national and worldwide deployment in support of any assigned mission. The squadron's mission capability includes all weather, day and night, airland, airdrop and aeromedical evacuation capability. The C-130 aircraft is capable to perform both inter-theatre and intra-theatre missions. The squadron is can also supply specially trained aircrews for intelligence, surveillance and reconnaissance operations when called upon. The squadron has pilots, navigators, flight engineers and loadmasters, life support, and administrative personnel assigned.

== History ==
=== World War II ===
The squadron was activated on 30 September 1942 at Mitchel Field, New York as the 342d Fighter Squadron and equipped with Republic P-47 Thunderbolts. It deployed to the Southwest Pacific Area, where the unit became part of Fifth Air Force in New Guinea. It engaged in combat operations until August 1945, then became part of the occupation forces in Japan. The unit returned to the United States during May 1946 and was inactivated.

=== Delaware Air National Guard ===
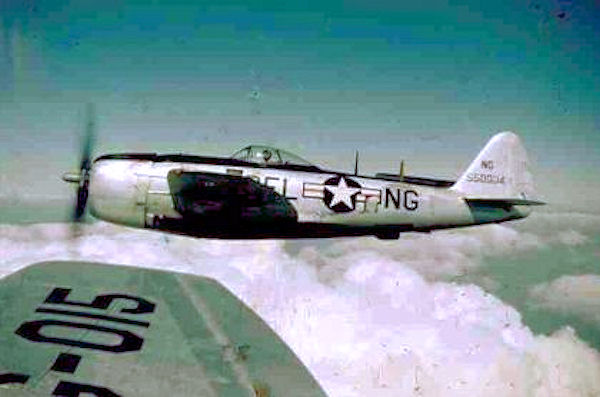
142d Fighter Squadron P-47N, 1947

The squadron was redesignated as the 142d Fighter Squadron and allotted to the National Guard on 24 May 1946. It was activated on 6 September 1946, and its formal federal recognition was recognized at a ceremony in the Wilmington Armory. The ceremony was conducted by Brigadier General Paul R. Rinard, the Adjutant General and Colonel John B. Grier, U.S. Property and Disbursing Officer for Delaware. Shortly afterwards the squadron received its first fighter planes, P-47N Thunderbolts.

Prior to being federalized during the Korean War on 1 February 1951, the unit received Republic F-84C Thunderjets. On 17 May 1951, the unit was redesignated the 142d Fighter-Interceptor Squadron and in September 1951 the unit exchanged its F-84s for the Lockheed F-94 Starfire interceptor aircraft to fit the unit's new air defense mission.

On 1 November 1952 the 142d Fighter-Interceptor Squadron was released from active duty and reorganized in the Delaware Air National Guard. On 1 December 1952 the unit was redesignated the 142d Fighter-Bomber Squadron and reverted to a propeller-driven aircraft, the North American F-51H Mustang.

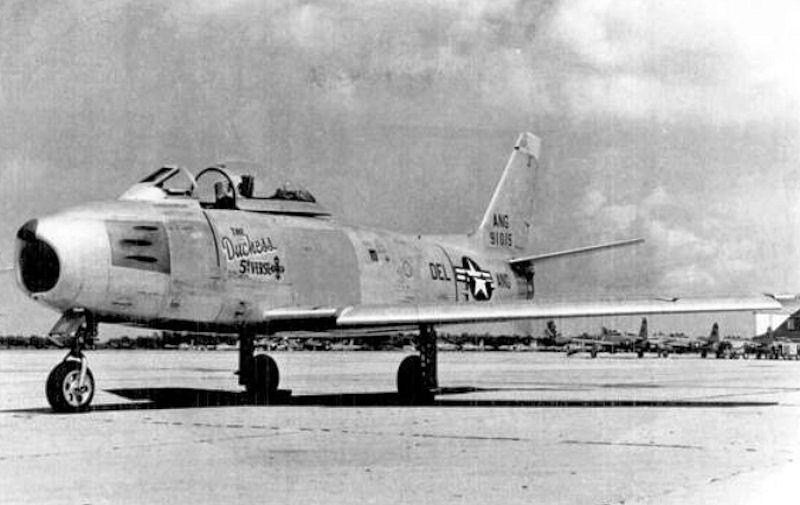
F-86A of the 142d Fighter-Bomber Squadron, New Castle County Airport, 1954

In 1954 the unit received North American F-86A Sabre day interceptor fighters to replace the F-51Hs. In July 1956 Major David F. McCallister (142d Fighter-Bomber Squadron Commander) set a fighter record by flying his F-86 Sabre 1,922 miles in three hours, 30 minutes, to win the Earl T. Ricks Memorial Trophy. On 10 November 1958 the unit was redesignated the 142d Tactical Fighter Squadron and its mobilization gaining command changed from the Air Force's Air Defense Command to the Tactical Air Command (TAC).

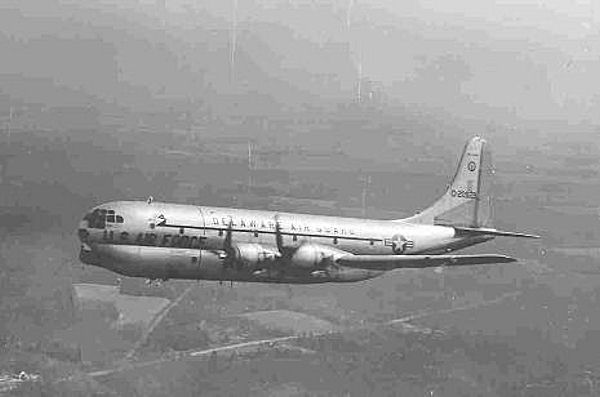
142d Air Transport Squadron, C-97 Stratofreighter, 1965

On 7 April 1962 the Delaware Air National Guard expanded the unit and established the 166th Air Transport Group. The group and squadron's gaining command changed from TAC to Military Air Transport Service. The 142d squadron was assigned to the 166th and redesignated as the 142d Air Transport Squadron. The squadron was re-equipped with the four engine Boeing C-97 Stratofreighter cargo aircraft. During the period from 1964 to 1974 the Delaware Air National Guard flew missions to South Vietnam. In September 1965, only three years after receiving the C-97, the Delaware Air National Guard received the McCallister Trophy as the Air National Guard Outstanding Transport Unit.

On 1 January 1966, the Military Air Transport Service was replaced by Military Airlift Command (MAC). In addition to that name change MAC-gained Air National Guard units were also redesignated. The 142d became the 142d Military Airlift Squadron on 1 January 1966. In April 1966, the unit was awarded the Outstanding Unit Trophy by the Air Force Association based on its impressive collection of achievements and safety record.

On 12 May 1971 the Group became the 142d Tactical Airlift Squadron and replaced its C-97s with Lockheed C-130A Hercules prop-jet cargo plane, and its gaining command transferred from MAC back to TAC. Its antiquated C-130Bs were upgraded in October 1985 with the delivery of a brand new factory fresh C-130H models.

On 25 January 1991 selected personnel were activated for the Persian Gulf War known as Operation Desert Storm (8 planes with crews and maintenance and support personnel.) A majority of the unit became part of the 1670th Tactical Airlift Group (Provisional) at Al Kharj Air Base, Saudi Arabia. On 30 June 1991 the aircraft and personnel were released from active duty.

Another name change occurred on 16 March 1992. The 142d dropped the "Tactical" and was redesignated the 142d Airlift Squadron. In conjunction with the redesignation, the unit's gaining command, MAC, was replaced by Air Mobility Command (AMC).

In September 1992, a group of personnel from the squadron participated in the Hurricane Andrew relief effort. On 26 October 1993 the gaining command for the squadron changed from AMC to Air Combat Command (ACC). On 20 November 1995 the squadron was awarded the Air Force Outstanding Unit Award for the period 15 August 1993 through 14 August 1995. On 1 April 1997 the gaining command for the squadron changed from ACC back to AMC.

== Lineage ==
- Constituted as the 342d Fighter Squadron (Single Engine) on 24 September 1942

Activated on 30 September 1942
Inactivated on 10 May 1946

- Redesignated 142d Fighter Squadron, Single Engine and allotted to the National Guard on 24 May 1946

Received federal recognition and activated on 6 September 1946
Redesignated: 142d Fighter Squadron, Jet in 1951
Federalized and called to active duty on 10 February 1951
Redesignated 142d Fighter-Interceptor Squadron on 17 May 1951
Inactivated, released from active duty and returned to Delaware state control on 1 November 1952
Redesignated 142d Fighter-Bomber Squadron and activated on 1 December 1952
Redesignated 142d Fighter-Interceptor Squadron c. January 1957
Redesignated 142d Tactical Fighter Squadron (Day) on 10 November 1958
Redesignated 142d Air Transport Squadron, Heavy on 7 April 1962
Redesignated 142d Military Airlift Squadron on 1 January 1966
Redesignated: 142d Tactical Airlift Squadron on 12 May 1971
Redesignated: 142d Airlift Squadron on 16 March 1992

=== Assignments ===
- 348th Fighter Group, 30 September 1942 – 10 May 1946 (attached to XIII Bomber Command c. 25 Aug-22 September 1944)
- 108th Fighter Group, 6 September 1946
- 111th Composite Group, 1 November 1950
- 113th Fighter-Interceptor Group, 10 February 1951
- 4710th Air Defense Wing, 6 February 1952 – 1 November 1952
- 113th Fighter-Bomber Group (later 113th Fighter-Interceptor Group, 113th Tactical Fighter Group), 1 December 1952
- 166th Air Transport Group (later 166th Military Airlift Group, 166th Tactical Airlift Group, 166th Airlift Group),7 April 1962
- 166th Operations Group, 10 January 1995 – Present

=== Stations ===
- Mitchel Field, New York, 30 September 1942
- Bradley Field, Connecticut, 4 October 1942
- Westover Field, Massachusetts, 29 October 1942
- Providence Airport, Rhode Island, c. 3 January 1943
- Westover Field, Massachusetts, 28 April 1943 – 9 May 1943
- Jackson Airfield (7 Mile Drome), Port Moresby, New Guinea, 23 June 1943
- Finschhafen Airfield, New Guinea, 16 December 1943
- Saidor Airfield, New Guinea, 29 March 1944
- Wakde Airfield, Wakde, Netherlands East Indies, 22 May 1944
- Kornasoren Airfield Noemfoor, Schouten Islands, New Guinea, 26 August 1944
- Tacloban Airfield, Leyte, Philippines, 16 November 1944
- Tanauan Airfield, Leyte, Philippines, 4 February 1945
- Floridablanca Airfield, Luzon, Philippines, 15 May 1945
- Ie Shima Airfield, Okinawa, 9 July 1945
- Itami Airfield, Japan, October 1945 – 10 May 1946
- New Castle County Airport, Delaware, 6 September 1946
- Greater Wilmington Airport, Delaware, May 1951 – 1 November 1952
- New Castle County Airport (later New Castle Air National Guard Base), Delaware, 1 December 1952 – present

=== Aircraft ===
- P-47 Thunderbolt, 1942–1945
- P-51 Mustang, 1945
- F-47N Thunderbolt, 1946–1951
- F-84 Thunderjet, 1951
- F-94 Starfire, 1951–1952
- F-51H Mustang, 1952–1954
- F-86A Sabre, 1954–1962
- C-97 Stratocruiser, 1962–1971
- C-130 Hercules, 1971–Present
