= Delaware World War II Army Airfields =

Delaware World War II Army Airfields
- Part of United States Army
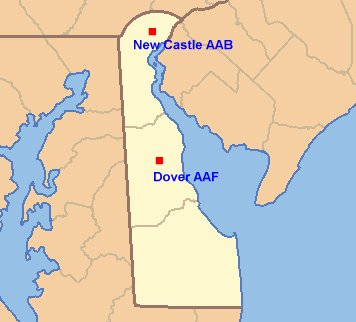
- Locations of major World War II USAAF Airfields in Delaware

Site information
- Type: Army Airfields
- Controlled by: United States Army Air Forces

Site history
- Built: 1940-1944
- In use: 1940-present

Garrison information
- Garrison: First Air Force; Army Air Force Training Command

During World War II, the United States Army Air Forces had two major airfields in Delaware. They were Dover Army Air Field and New Castle Army Air Base.

Dover Army Air Field was located 4 miles southeast of Dover, Delaware. It was assigned to First Air Force.

- 18th Observation Squadron (65th Observation Group), 2 March 1942 – 23 March 1942
- 80th Bombardment Squadron (Medium)(45th Bomb Gp), 29 April 1942 – 15 July 1942
- Hq and Hq Sq, 45th Bombardment Group (Medium), 16 May 1942 – 27 July 1942
- 39th Bombardment Squadron (Medium)/ 3rd Antisubmarine Squadron (Heavy), 19 July 1942 – 28 February 1943
- 312th Base Headquarters and Air Base Squadron, 16 September 1942 – 10 April 1944
- 365th Fighter Group (Single Engine), 11 August 1943 – 18 November 1943
- 83rd Fighter Group (Single Engine), 22 November 1943 – 10 April 1944
- 125th Army Air Force Base Unit, 10 April 1944 – 31 March 1946

The base is now Dover Air Force Base.

New Castle Army Air Base, was located 1 mile west of New Castle, Delaware. It was assigned to First Air Force.

- 62d Pursuit Squadron (Interceptor) (56th Pursuit Group), 10 December 1941 – 17 January 1942
- 4th Pursuit Squadron (Interceptor)/ 4th Fighter Squadron (52nd Ftr Gp), 27 April 1942 – 12 June 1942
- Assigned to Ferrying Division, Air Transport Command
  - 344th Air Base Squadron / 344th Base Headquarters and Air Base Squadron, 29 May 1942 – 31 March 1944
  - 2nd Ferrying Group, 29 May 1942 – 4 December 1945
  - 552nd Army Air Force Base Unit, 31 March 1944 – 31 December 1945
  - 1596th Army Air Force Base Unit, 1 December 1944-November 1945

Was: New Castle Air National Guard Base
Now: New Castle Airport (ILG)
