= Airport Villa, Delaware =

- Unincorporated community
- Location within Delaware Location within the United States
- Coordinates: 39.6883°N 75.6139°W
- Country: United States
- State: Delaware
- County: New Castle
- Time zone: UTC-5 (Eastern (EST))
  - Summer (DST): UTC-4 (EDT)
- Area code: 302

Airport Villa was a housing project that was once part of New Castle Air Force Base (now New Castle County Airport), in New Castle County, Delaware. It was built to house military personnel during the Korean War (1950–1953). In 1956, New Castle County purchased it from the U.S. Air Force and reopened it for civilian housing. Rentals of the houses were managed by the Harris-Hanby Real Estate Agency, New Castle, Delaware.

== History ==
There were two parts to Airport Villa, one on either side of Airport Road. The two villas contained 100 houses. Total population during the mid-1960s was about 500 people on the entire 40-acre (160,000 m^{2}) project; there were several yellow barracks close to the houses.

Airport Villa was demolished about 1982. The area that was formerly Airport Villa, however, can be located; 290 Airport Rd. is on the western boundary, and Reads Way is on the eastern. Paved asphalt roads are still visible, though the houses are gone. The New Castle County Government office park is now in the area, on Reads Way.

== Housing at Airport Villa ==
The houses at Airport Villa were constructed of cinder blocks and had roofs of tar and gravel. Each home had a carport, patio, substantial sized yard and high windows on the front. The houses were in the style of a duplex, connected at the back, with the fronts of each facing onto different streets.

Inside, the homes were very spacious, each containing two or three bedrooms. The kitchens had a bar-counter that was connected to the dining area. The floors were tiled-over concrete slabs.

Airport Villa's street names were alphabetical, e.g. A, B, C. The East Villa had 24 houses and four streets, A, B, C & D, running east and west, with long connection roads running north and south. The West Villa was much larger, with 76 houses and had street names E, F, G & H.

Students at Airport Villa attended Manor Park Elementary School, George Read Jr. High, and William Penn High School. Later, Carrie Downey was the elementary school. Some of the neighboring projects were Chelsea Estates, Wilmington Manor, Delaware and Penn Acres.

== Location ==
Airport Villa can be reached by leaving Route 13 onto Route 141 North towards Newport, then following 141 North to the 3rd traffic light, then turning left onto Commons Blvd into the New Castle Corporate Commons, before continuing past the next traffic light, and turning right near 290 Airport Road, on the right-hand side.
