= Palaung =

Palaung or De'ang or Taang may refer to:

- Palaung people, a people of Shan State, Myanmar
  - Palaung language, their Mon-Khmer language
- Delaware Air National Guard
