= Boeing C-97 Stratofreighter =

Long-range heavy military cargo aircraft built 1944–1952

C-97 Stratofreighter
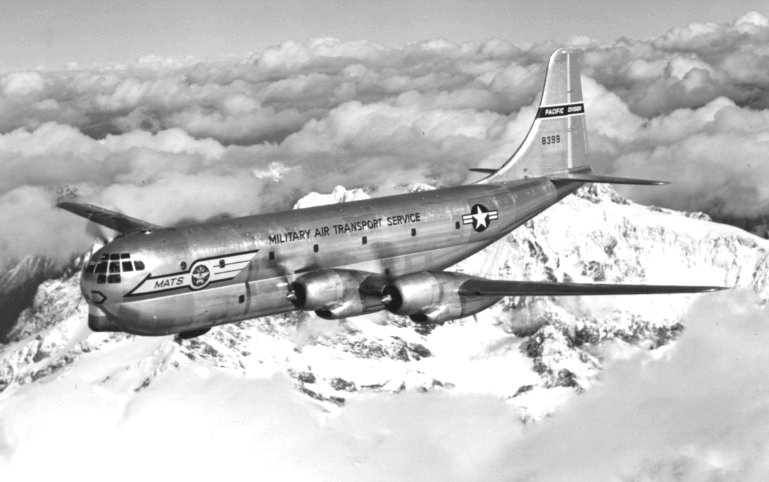

General information
- Type: Military transport aircraft
- Manufacturer: Boeing
- Primary users: United States Air Force Israeli Air Force; Spanish Air Force
- Number built: 77 (plus 811 tankers)

History
- Manufactured: 1947–1958
- Introduction date: 1947
- First flight: 9 November 1944
- Retired: 1978
- Developed from: Boeing B-29 Superfortress; Boeing B-50 Superfortress
- Variant: Boeing KC-97 Stratofreighter
- Developed into: Boeing 377 Stratocruiser; Aero Spacelines Pregnant Guppy; Aero Spacelines Super Guppy; Aero Spacelines Mini Guppy

The Boeing C-97 Stratofreighter is a long-range heavy military cargo aircraft developed from the B-29 and B-50 bombers.

C-97s served in the Berlin Airlift, the Korean War, and the Vietnam War. Some aircraft served as flying command posts for the Strategic Air Command, while others were modified for use in Aerospace Rescue and Recovery Squadrons (ARRS).

== Design and development ==
Design began in 1942. The C-97 Stratofreighter was developed towards the end of World War II by fitting a second lobe on top of the fuselage and wings of the B-29 Superfortress with the tail, wing, and engine layout being nearly identical.

The XC-97 and YC-97 can be distinguished from the Boeing 377 Stratocruiser and later C-97s by the shorter fin, and later ones by the flying boom and jet engines on the tanker models.

The prototype XC-97 was powered by the same 2,200 hp (1,600 kW) Wright R-3350 engines as used in the B-29. The XC-97 took off for its first flight on 9 November 1944, just after the death of Boeing president Philip G. Johnson.

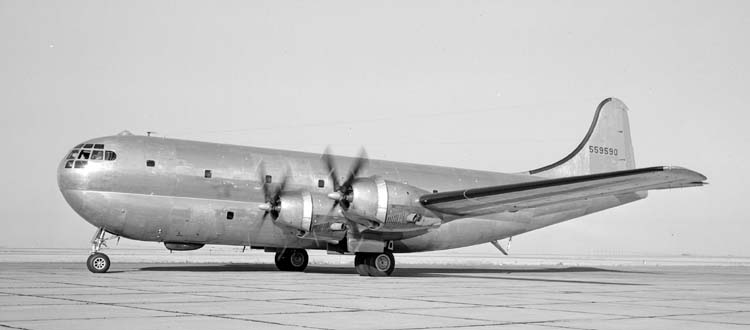
A YC-97 Stratofreighter with the shorter fin and smaller engines of the B-29 in 1947

On 9 January 1945, the first prototype, piloted by Major Curtin L. Reinhardt, flew from Seattle to Washington, D.C. in 6 hours 4 minutes, an average speed of 383 mph (616 km/h) with 20,000 lb (9,100 kg) of cargo. The tenth and all subsequent aircraft were fitted with the 3,500 hp (2,600 kW) Pratt & Whitney Wasp Major engines and taller fin and rudder of the B-50 Superfortress.

The C-97 had clamshell doors under its tail so that two retractable ramps could be used to drive in cargo, but it was not a tactical airlifter able to deliver to primitive forward bases. The doors could not be opened in flight, but could be removed to carry out air drops. The C-97 had a useful payload of 35,000 lb (16,000 kg), which could include two 2½-ton trucks, towed artillery, or light tracked vehicles such as the M56 Scorpion. The C-97 featured cabin pressurization, which made long flights more comfortable.

The C-97 was developed into the civilian Boeing 377 Stratocruiser, a transoceanic airliner that could be fitted with sleeper cabins and featured a lower deck lounge. The first Stratocruiser flew on 8 July 1947. Only 56 were built.

== Operational history ==
The C-97 entered service in 1947, during a period of rapid development of heavy transport aircraft. Only 77 were built before the Douglas C-124 Globemaster II was delivered in 1950, with nearly twice the payload capacity of the C-97. The USAF Strategic Air Command operated C-97 Stratofreighters from 1949 to 1978.

Early in its service life, it served as an airborne alternative SAC command post. 77 C-97 transports were built. 811 were built as KC-97 Stratofreighters for inflight refueling. The KC-97 began to be phased out with the introduction of the Boeing KC-135 Stratotanker in 1957. Many KC-97s were later refitted as C-97G transports and equipped several squadrons of the U.S. Air National Guard.

One YC-97A (45–59595) was used in the Berlin Airlift during April 1949, operating for the 1st Strategic Support Squadron. It suffered a landing gear accident at Gatow and by the time it was repaired, the Soviet Blockade was lifted.

C-97s evacuated casualties during the Korean War. In the late 1960s, C-97s participated in the Biafran airlift, delivering relief materials to Uli airstrip in Biafra during the Nigerian Civil War. Flying under the cover of darkness and at treetop level to evade radar, at least two C-97s were lost.

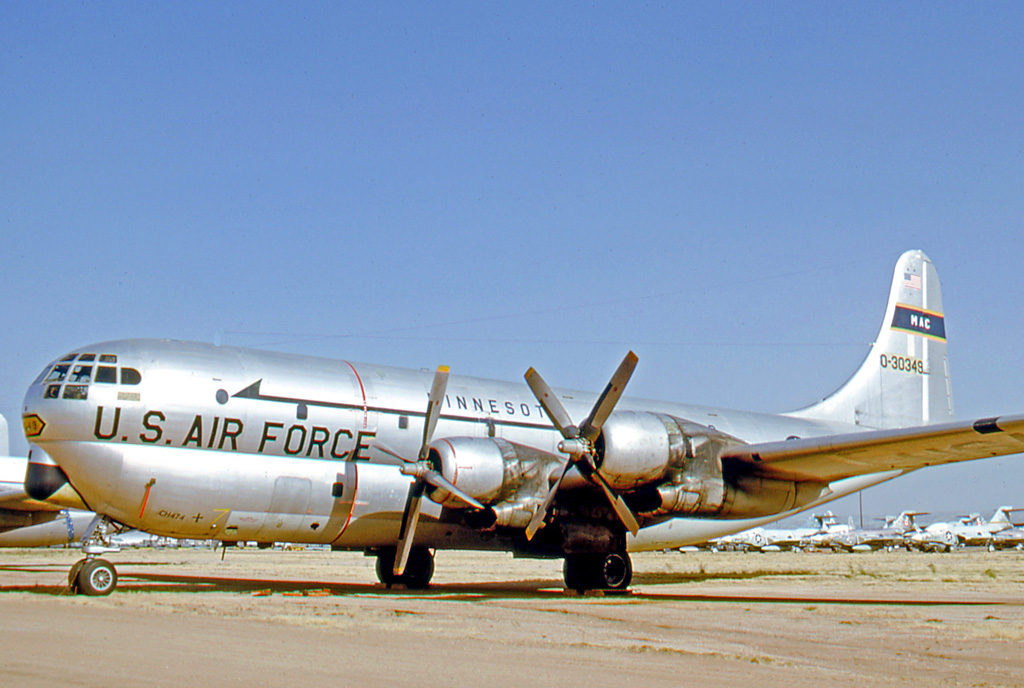
A Boeing KC-97G Stratofreighter of the Minnesota Air National Guard in 1971 after service as part of Military Airlift Command

One C-97 is airworthy at the present day, (S/N 52-2718, named "Angel of Deliverance") operated by the Berlin Airlift Historical Foundation. It is painted as YC-97A 45–59595, the only C-97 to participate in the Berlin Airlift.

The Israelis turned to Stratocruisers and KC-97s when they could not buy the preferred C-130. They adapted Boeing 377 Stratocruiser airliners into transports, including many using C-97 tail sections including the loading ramps. Others were adapted with swiveling tails and refueling pods. One Israeli C-97 was downed by an Egyptian SA-2 Guideline missile on 17 September 1971, while flying as an electronic counter-measures platform some 12 miles from the Suez Canal.

== Variants ==
XC-97
Military designation of the prototype Boeing 367, three built. First prototype was designated Model 367-1-1 by Boeing, while the second and third were designated Model 367-1-2.
YC-97
Company designation Model 367-5-5. Cargo transport, six built.

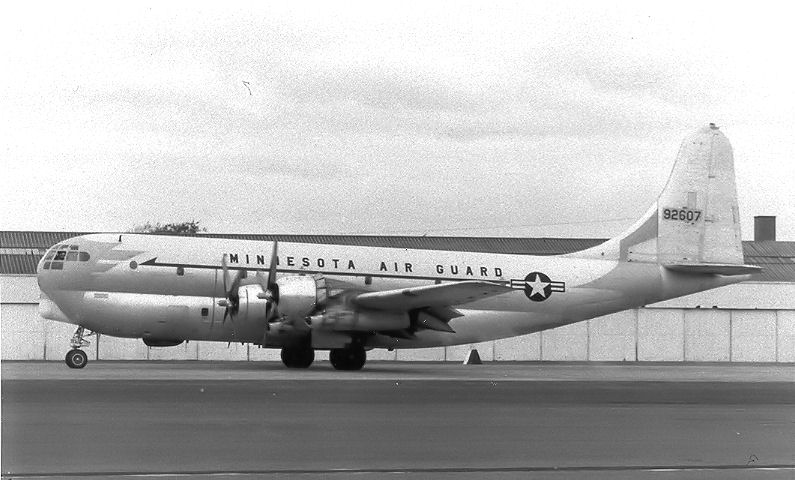
C-97A Stratofreighter 49-2607 of the Minnesota Air National Guard, 1960

YC-97A
Company designation Model 367-4-6. Troop carrier, three built.
C-97A
Company designation Model 367-4-19. Transport, 50 built.
KC-97A
Three C-97As were converted into aerial refueling tankers with rear loading door removed and a flight refueling boom added. After the design was proven, they were converted back into the standard C-97A.
YC-97B
Company designation Model 367-4-7. Fitted with 80 airliner-style seats, later redesignated C-97B, in 1954 became C-97D, retired to MASDC 15 December 1969.
C-97C
Company designation Model 367-4-29. Second production version, 14 built; those used as medical evacuation transports during the Korean War were designated MC-97C.
VC-97D
Staff transport and flying command post conversions, three C-97As converted.
KC-97E
Company designation Model 367-4-29. Aerial refueling tankers with rear loading doors permanently closed; 60 built.
C-97E
KC-97Es converted to transports.
KC-97F
Company designation Model 367-76-29. 3800 hp R-4360-59B engines and minor changes; 159 built.
C-97F
KC-97Fs converted to transports.
KC-97G
Company designation Model 367-76-66. Dual-role aerial refueling tankers/cargo transportation aircraft. KC-97G models carried underwing fuel tanks; 592 built.
GKC-97G
Five KC-97Gs were used as ground instruction airframes.
JKC-97G
One aircraft was modified to test the underwing General Electric J47-GE-23 jet engines, and was later designated KC-97L.
C-97G
135 KC-97Gs converted to transports.
EC-97G
ELINT conversion of three KC-97Gs. 53–106 was operated by the CIA for covert ELINT operations in the West Berlin Air Corridor.
HC-97G
KC-97Gs converted for search and rescue operations; 22 converted.
KC-97H
One KC-97F was experimentally converted into a probe-and-drogue refueling aircraft.

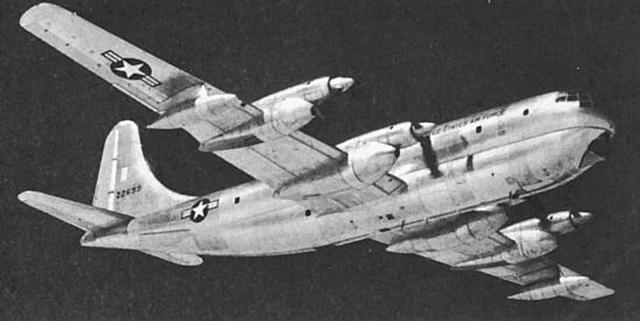
A YC-97J, an experimental turboprop-powered variant, in flight

YC-97J
Company designation Model 367-86-542. KC-97G conversion with four 5,700 hp (4,250 kW) Pratt & Whitney YT34-P-5 turboprops, two converted. Originally designated YC-137.
C-97K
27 KC-97Gs converted to troop transports.
KC-97L
81 KC-97Gs modified with two J47 turbojet engines on underwing pylons.

== Operators ==
=== Military operators ===
Israel

- Israeli Air Force

Spain

- Spanish Air Force

United States

- United States Air Force

=== U.S. Air Force units ===
The following Air Force wing organizations flew the various C-97 models at some time during their existence:

==== Air National Guard ====
- 105th Aeromedical Transport Group – Westchester County Airport, New York (1962–1969)
  - 137th Air Transport Squadron
- 106th Air Transport Group – Suffolk County Airport, New York
  - 102d Air Transport Squadron
- 109th Air Transport Group – Schenectady Airport, New York
  - 139th Air Transport Squadron
- 111th Air Transport Group – NAS Willow Grove, Pennsylvania
  - 103d Air Transport Squadron
- 116th Air Transport Group – Dobbins ARB, Georgia
  - 128th Air Transport Squadron (Heavy)
- 118th Air Transport Group – Berry Field Air National Guard Base / Nashville International Airport, Tennessee
  - 105th Air Transport Squadron
- 126th Air Refueling Wing – O'Hare Airport, Illinois
  - 108th Air Refueling Squadron
- 128th Air Refueling Wing – Gen. Mitchell Airport, Wisconsin
  - 126th Air Refueling Squadron
- 133d Air Transport Wing – Minneapolis-St Paul International Airport, Minnesota
  - 109th Air Transport Squadron (Heavy)
- 137th Air Transport Group – Will Rogers World Airport, Oklahoma
  - 185th Air Transport Squadron
- 138th Air Transport Group – Tulsa Air National Guard Base / Tulsa International Airport, Oklahoma
  - 125th Air Transport Squadron
- 139th Air Transport Group – Rosecrans Air National Guard Base, Missouri
  - 180th Air Transport Squadron (Heavy)
- 146th Air Transport Wing – Van Nuys Air National Guard Base / Van Nuys Airport, California
  - 115th Air Transport Squadron (Heavy)
  - 195th Air Transport Squadron (Heavy)
- 151st Air Transport Wing – Salt Lake City Air National Guard Base / Salt Lake City International Airport, Utah
  - 191st Air Transport Squadron (Heavy)
- 157th Air Transport Group – Grenier AFB, New Hampshire(1960–1964)/ Pease AFB, New Hampshire (1964–1968)
  - 133d Air Transport Squadron (Heavy)
- 161st Air Transport Group – Sky Harbor International Airport, Arizona (1966–1972)
  - 197th Air Transport Squadron
- 162d Air Transport Wing -, Arizona
- 164th Air Transport Group – Memphis Air National Guard Base / Memphis International Airport, Tennessee
  - 155th Air Transport Squadron (Heavy)
- 165th Air Transport Group – Savannah Air National Guard Base / Savannah International Airport, Georgia
  - 158th Air Transport Squadron (Heavy)
- 166th Air Transport Group – New Castle Air National Guard Base / Greater Wilmington Airport, Delaware
  - 142d Air Transport Squadron

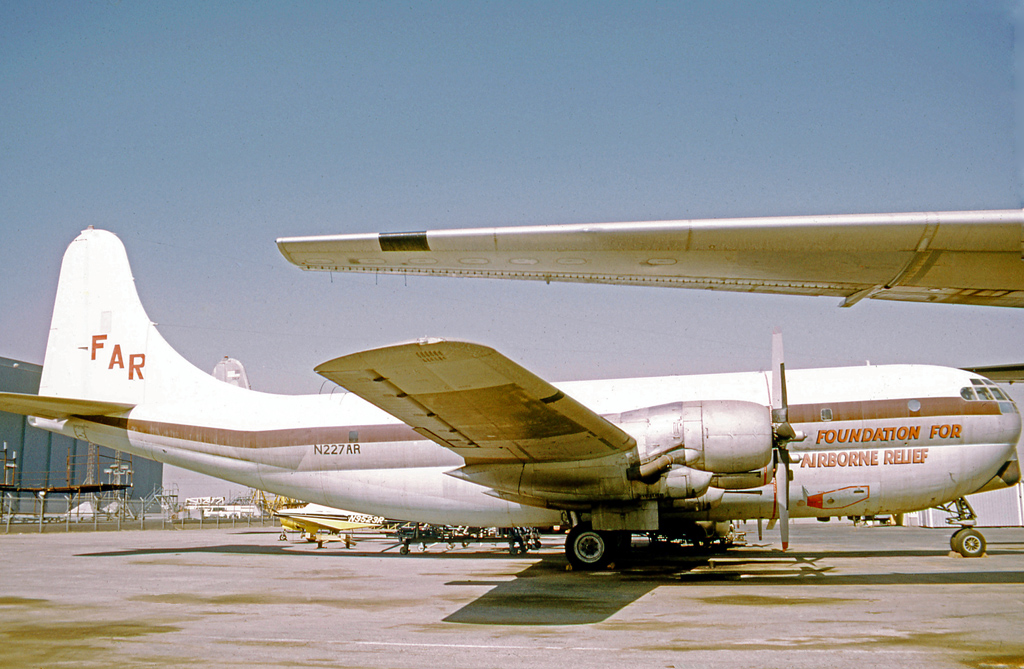
A Boeing C-97G of the Foundation for Airborne Relief at Long Beach Airport, California, 1973

=== Civil operators ===
- Balair
- Berlin Airlift Historical Foundation
- Foundation for Airborne Relief (USA)
- Hawkins & Powers Aviation
- Zantop Air Transport

== Accidents and incidents ==
22 May 1947
USAAF XC-97 43-27472 crashed in a wheat field near Wright-Patterson Air Force Base and caught fire, killing five of seven crew on board.
6 June 1951
USAF C-97A 48-0398 crashed near Kelly Air Force Base due to a possible asymmetric flap extension on takeoff, killing all nine crew on board.
15 October 1951
After taking off from Lajes Field, Azores, USAF C-97A 49-2602 of the Military Air Transport Service went missing on a flight from Lajes AFB (LFB), Azores to Westover Air Force Base, Massachusetts. The aircraft was piloted by Captain John Francis Dailey Jr. and had a crew of 11. A total of 50 aircraft and ships searched the intended route but no trace of the aircraft or crew was ever found.
22 October 1951
USAF C-97A 48-0413 crashed and burned next to a runway at Kelly AFB, killing four of six on board.
22 March 1957
USAF C-97C 50-0702 en route to Tokyo went missing over the Pacific Ocean, with 10 crew and 57 passengers on board. It is the deadliest incident ever involving the C-97.
8 August 1957
USAF C-97 en route to Hawaii from US. No.1 engine lost its propeller and damaged No.2 engine. Aircraft flew for 5 hours at 150 ft altitude to land at Hilo.
19 January 1958
USAF C-97A 49-2597 en route to Kwajalein from Honolulu went missing over the Pacific Ocean with seven crew on board. The U.S. Navy confirmed that debris found 277 miles to the southwest of Honolulu, was wreckage of the plane.
29 June 1964
USAF HC-97G 52-2773, along with USAF HC-54D 42-72590, were performing pararescue training and photography missions for the NASA Gemini program when the HC-54 banked to the right, colliding with the HC-97 and shearing off the wing and tail section. Both aircraft crashed in the water off Bermuda, killing 17 on board both aircraft. Seven survived after they jumped before the aircraft collided. The cause was probably incapacitation of the HC-54 pilot.
26 September 1969
A Nordchurchaid C-97G, (N52676), struck trees and crashed while on final approach to Uli Airstrip, killing all five on board.
30 July 1987
After taking off, a C-97G (HI-481) operated by Belize Air International, a cargo airline, crashed onto the Mexico City-Toluca highway after the cargo shifted, killing 5 of 12 on board and 44 on the ground.

== Surviving aircraft ==
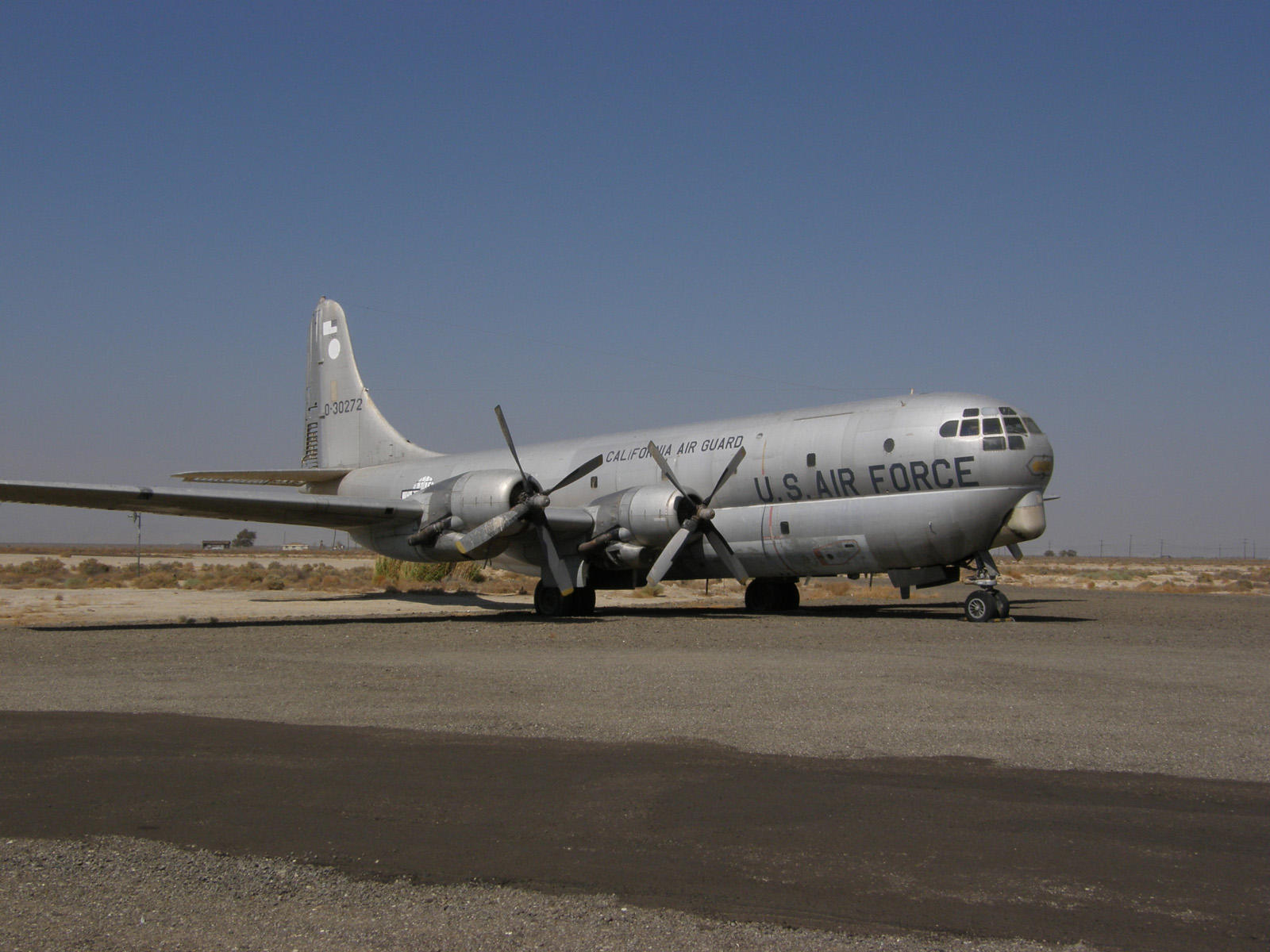
Former California Air National Guard C-97G 53-0272 at the Milestones of Flight Museum, Fox Field, Lancaster, California, 2007.

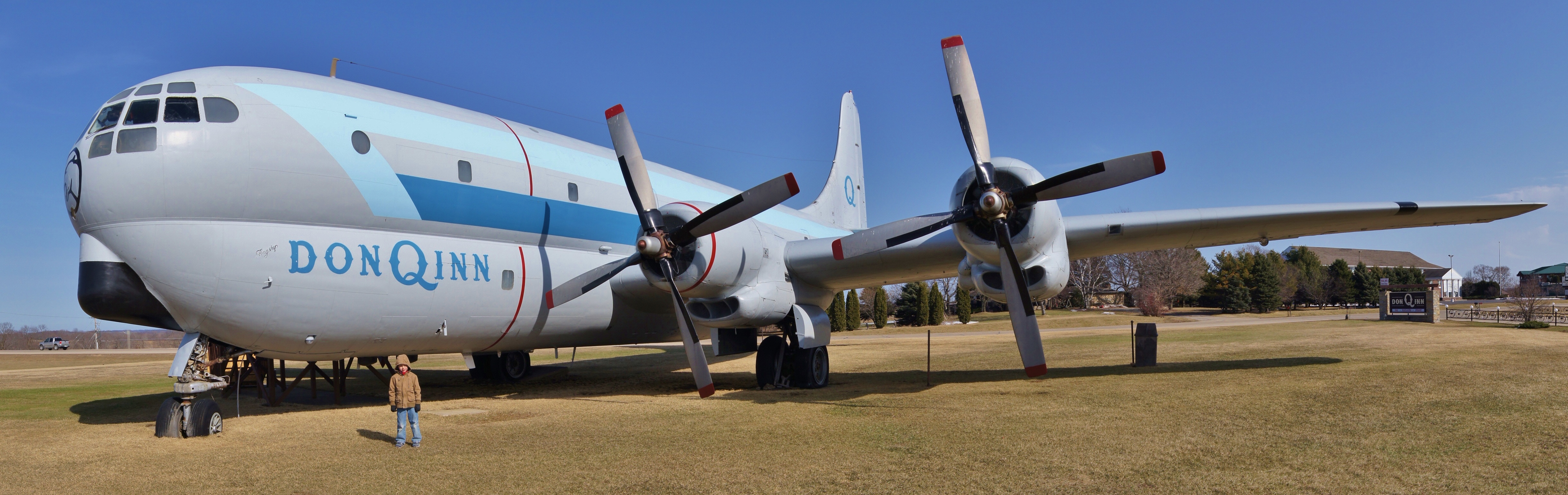
C-97G 52-2764 parked in front of the Don Q Inn just north of Dodgeville, Wisconsin on Highway 23.

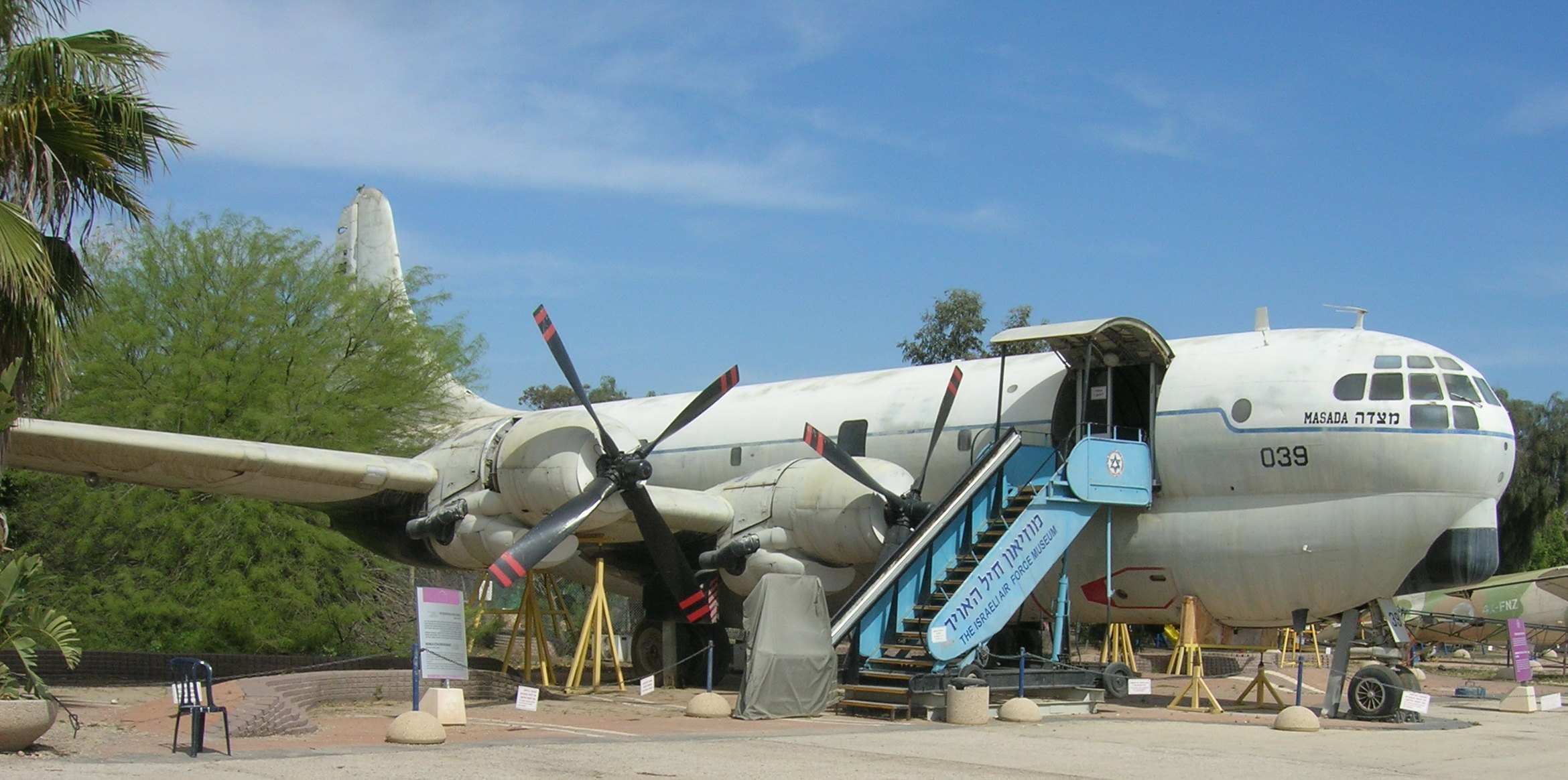
C-97 painted to represent a 377M Anak, Israeli Air Force Museum (2007)

=== Israel ===
On display

- C-97K 035/4X-FPO – Israeli Air Force Museum, Hatzerim Airbase, Beersheba, Israel.

=== United States ===
Airworthy

C-97G (converted from KC-97G)

- 52-2718 "Angel of Deliverance" – Berlin Airlift Historical Foundation of Farmingdale, New Jersey. It is painted as YC-97A 45-59595.

On display

C-97G (all converted from KC-97G)

- 52-2626 – Pima Air & Space Museum, adjacent to Davis–Monthan Air Force Base in Tucson, Arizona.
- 52-2764 – Don Q Inn, next to the (now closed) Dodgeville Municipal Airport outside Dodgeville, Wisconsin. It was used for filming commercials.
- 53-218 – Minnesota Air Guard Museum on the north side of the Minneapolis–Saint Paul International Airport in Minneapolis, Minnesota. It has been there since November 2003.

A KC-97 formerly operated by Hawkins & Powers Aviation that was converted as an aerial firefighting air tanker is also on display at the Museum of Flight & Aerial Firefighting at the South Big Horn County Airport in Greybull, Wyoming.

== Specifications (C-97) ==
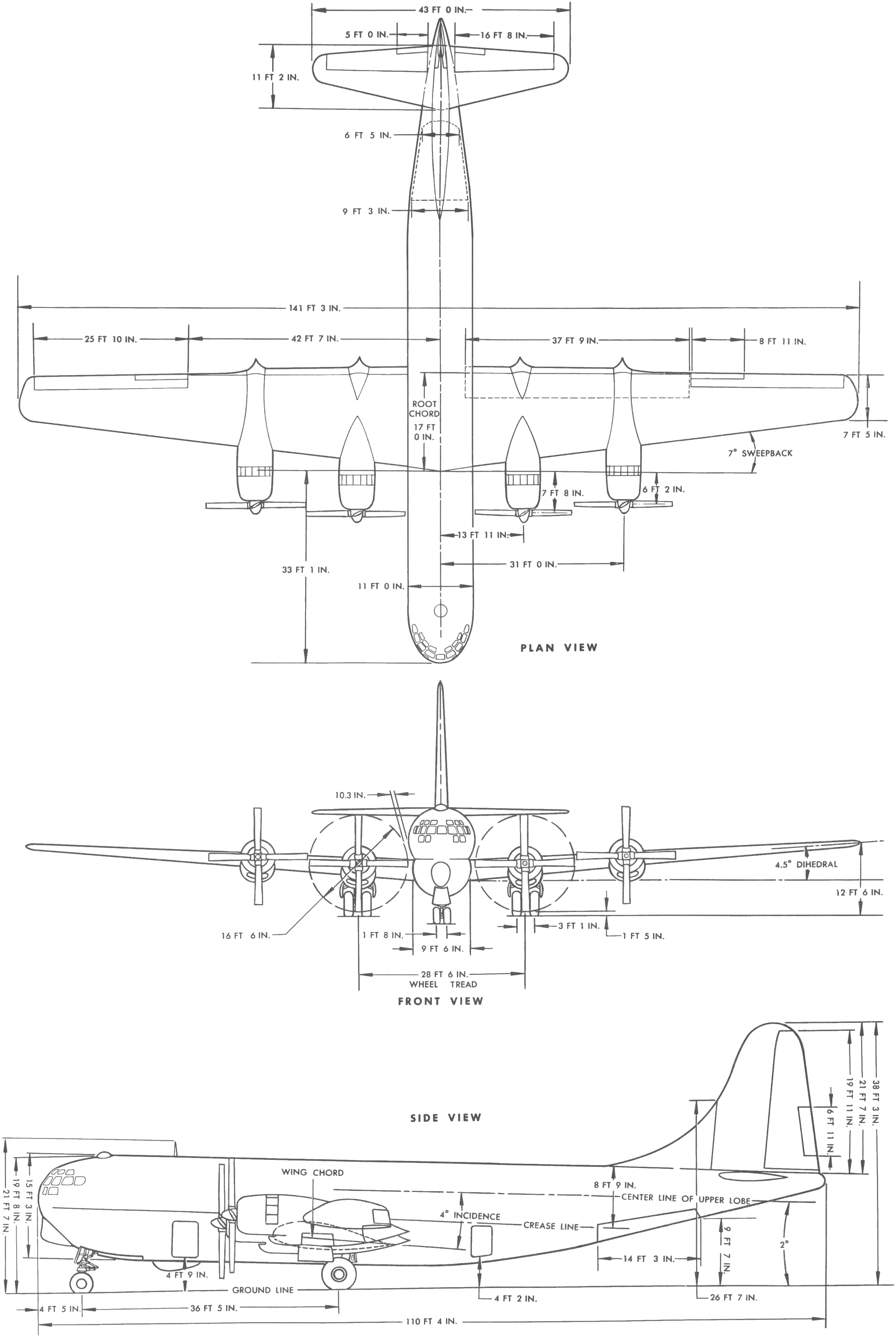
3-view line drawing of the Boeing C-97 Stratofreighter

Data from Boeing C-97 Stratofreighter

General characteristics

- Crew: 5–6 (Pilot, Copilot, Navigator, Flight engineer, 1–2 Loadmasters)
- Capacity:
  - 134 troops or
  - 69 stretchers or
  - refuelling boom (three KC-97A aircraft only)
- Length: 110 ft 4 in (33.63 m)
- Wingspan: 141 ft 3 in (43.05 m)
- Height: 38 ft 3 in (11.66 m)
- Wing area: 1,734 sq ft (161.1 m^{2})
- Airfoil: root: Boeing 117 (22%); tip: Boeing 117 (9%)
- Empty weight: 82,500 lb (37,421 kg)
- Gross weight: 120,000 lb (54,431 kg)
- Max takeoff weight: 175,000 lb (79,379 kg)
- Powerplant: 4 × Pratt & Whitney R-4360B Wasp Major 28-cylinder air-cooled radial piston engines, 3,500 hp (2,600 kW) each
- Propellers: 4-bladed Hamilton Standard constant-speed fully-feathering propellers

Performance

- Maximum speed: 375 mph (604 km/h, 326 kn)
- Cruise speed: 300 mph (480 km/h, 260 kn)
- Range: 4,300 mi (6,900 km, 3,700 nmi)
- Ferry range: 5,760 mi (9,270 km, 5,010 nmi)
- Service ceiling: 35,000 ft (11,000 m)
- Wing loading: 69.2 lb/sq ft (338 kg/m^{2})
- Power/mass: 0.117 hp/lb (0.192 kW/kg)

== See also ==
Related development

- Aero Spacelines Mini Guppy
- Aero Spacelines Pregnant Guppy
- Aero Spacelines Super Guppy
- Boeing 377 Stratocruiser
- Boeing B-50 Superfortress
- Boeing KC-97 Stratofreighter

Aircraft of comparable role, configuration, and era

- Convair XC-99
- Douglas C-54 Skymaster
- Douglas C-118 Liftmaster
- Douglas C-124 Globemaster II
- Lockheed C-69 Constellation
- Lockheed C-121 Constellation
- Lockheed C-130 Hercules
- Lockheed R7V-2/YC-121F Constellation

Related lists

- List of military aircraft of the United States
