= New Castle Air National Guard Base =

United States Air Force installation

- Near New Castle, Delaware in the United States of America
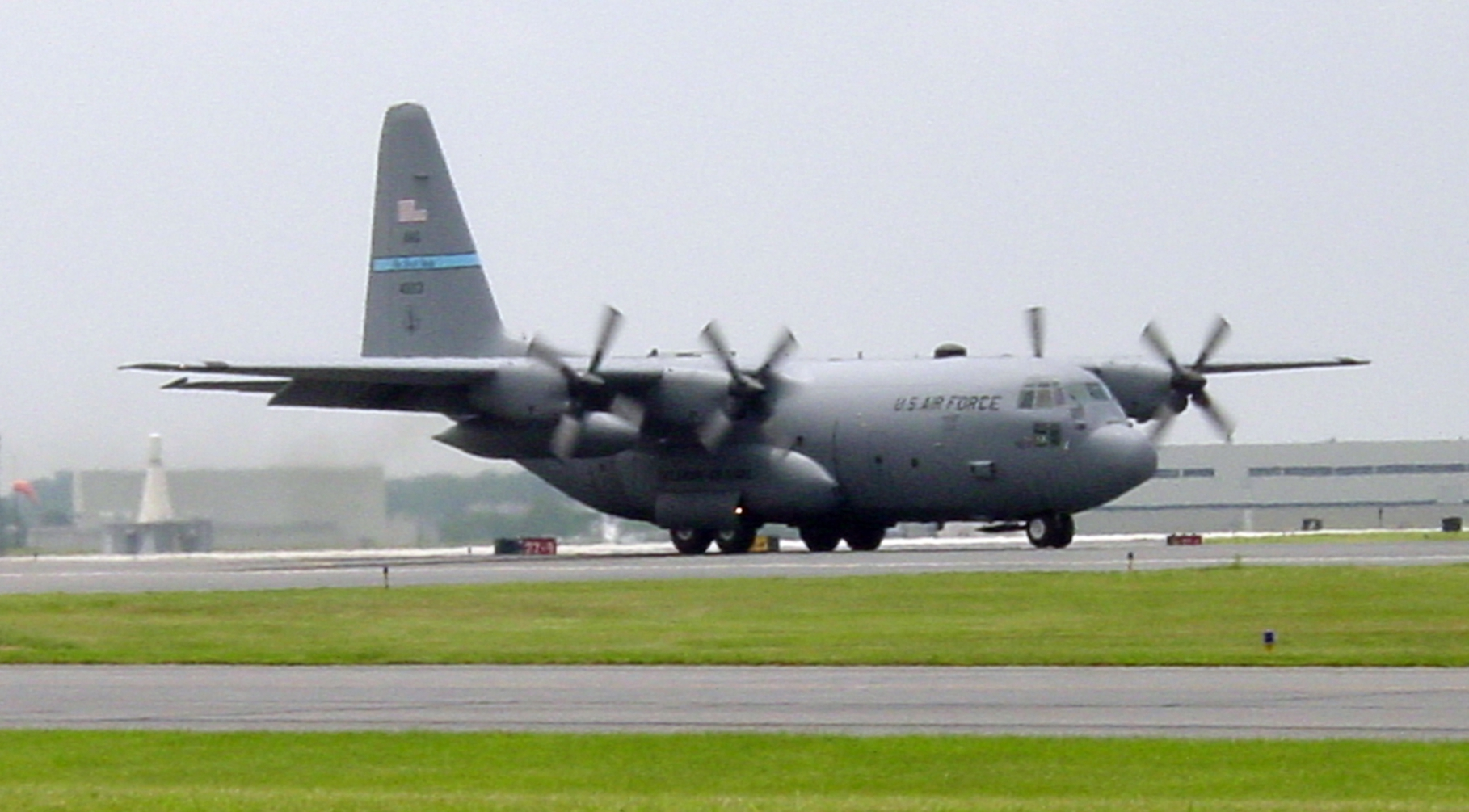
- A C-130H-LM Hercules from the 142nd Airlift Squadron, 166th Airlift Wing, Delaware Air National Guard moments after landing at New Castle ANGB in June 2018.

Site information
- Type: Air National Guard Base
- Owner: Department of Defense
- Operator: US Air Force (USAF)
- Controlled by: Delaware Air National Guard (ANG)
- Condition: Operational
- Website: www.166aw.ang.af.mil

Location
- Location in the United States
- Coordinates: 39°41′07″N 075°35′57″W

Site history
- Built: 1943 (as New Castle Army Air Base)
- In use: 1943 – present

Garrison information
- Garrison: 166th Airlift Wing

Airfield information
- Identifiers: IATA: ILG, ICAO: KILG, FAA LID: ILG, WMO: 724089
- Elevation: 24.3 metres (80 ft) AMSL
Runways
Direction	Length and surface
9/27	2,217.4 metres (7,275 ft) Asphalt
1/19	2,137.2 metres (7,012 ft) Asphalt
14/32	1,402.6 metres (4,602 ft) Asphalt
- Airfield shared with Wilmington Airport. Source: Federal Aviation Administration

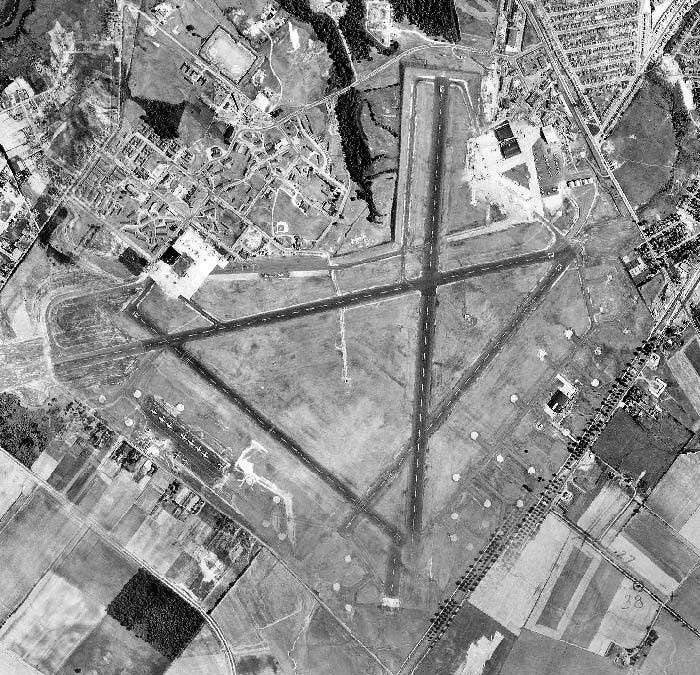
New Castle Air Force Base, 1954

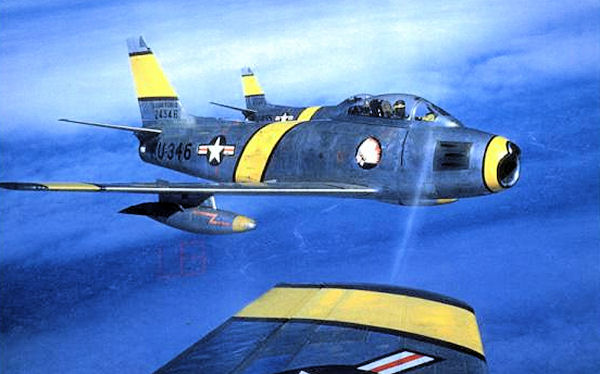
North American F-86F-25-NH Sabres of the 4th FIW/335th FIS "Chiefs" over Korea. Serial 52-5346 identifiable.

New Castle National Guard Base is a United States Air Force installation under the control of the Delaware Air National Guard, located at Wilmington Airport in New Castle County, Delaware.

== Overview ==
The base is the home of the 166th Airlift Wing (166 AW) of the Delaware Air National Guard. The wing is operationally-gained by the Air Mobility Command (AMC). Operating eight permanently assigned, Lockheed C-130 H2 Hercules transport aircraft, the wing provides the U.S. Air Force with tactical airlift and air and land drop of troops, cargo and passengers and aeromedical evacuation of patients anywhere in the world.

The installation is located on 79.6 acres and includes 44 buildings totaling 256,534 square feet. The normal population of the installation is 294 full-time Active Guard Reserve (AGR) and Air Reserve Technician Program (ART) personnel, but surges to 1150 personnel one weekend per month. The aircraft of the 166th have seen duty in Saudi Arabia during Operations Desert Shield and Desert Storm (1990/1991), Operation Just Cause in Panama (1989), Operation Joint Endeavor in Bosnia (1995), and as part of the Global War on Terrorism.

Additionally, the wing has a civil engineer / Base Engineer Emergency Force (Prime BEEF) function, the 166th Civil Engineer Squadron (166 CES) and a network warfare unit (the 166th Network Warfare Squadron) (166 NWS).

== History ==
=== World War II ===
Previously called the Wilmington Airport and the Greater Wilmington Airport, the property was taken over by the United States Army Air Forces during World War II. Under USAAF control, the airport was renamed New Castle Army Air Base.

Opened in May 1943, New Castle AAB was assigned to the Air Corps Ferrying Command 2d Ferrying Group with the 552d Army Air Forces Base Unit being the host unit in charge of the base and its facilities. The primary mission of the airfield was to facilitate the movement of aircraft overseas for delivery to the British and other Allies.

Members of the historic Women Airforce Service Pilots (WASP). WASPs served as test and ferry pilots and towed targets for student gunners. There is a statue today at the airport that honors the women of WASP that served their country in the time of need. On 30 June 1945, the 1596th AAF Base Unit replaced the 552d AAFBU and the 2d Ferrying group was replaced by the 2d Foreign Transport Group. The mission of the base was changed to being responsible for overseas air transport of passengers and air cargo.

=== Continental Air Command ===
With the general drawdown of the Air Force after the war, New Castle Airport became a joint-use base, with civilian aircraft operating from the airfield as an airport. The 328th Troop Carrier squadron was activated at the base on 1 July 1946. It operated C-47 transports from the airfield.

On 1 September 1949, the military facilities at the airport were assigned to Continental Air Command (ConAC) and the Air Force Reserve's 512th Air Base Group became the host unit, remaining so until 31 January 1951 when it was reassigned to Reading Municipal Airport, Pennsylvania. During its tenure as host unit, the Air Force Reserve and the 512th Troop Carrier Group operated C-46 Commandos (325th, 326th, 327th and 328th Troop Carrier Squadrons) returned from Reading after it closed as a reserve facility. The 512th was activated to Federal Service on 1 April 1951 due to the Korean War. Its personnel and aircraft were reassigned as fillers to active duty units and the group was inactivated two weeks later.

The 512th ABG was replaced by the Federalized Delaware Air National Guard's 113th Air Base Group, becoming the host unit on 1 February 1951. The mission of the 113th was to organize, administer, equip, train and prepare assigned ANG personnel for combat and to maintain a level of operational effectiveness. With its activation ended in 1952, the 113th was replaced by the 82d Air Base squadron on 2 January 1952.

The 512th TCG was re-formed in the Air Force Reserve on 14 June 1952, being at New Castle Airport as a reserve unit until 20 Jul 1958 when it was reassigned to Willow Grove Air Reserve Station, Pennsylvania.

=== Air Defense Command ===
In 1950 the facility was renamed New Castle Air Force Base, with the Eastern Air Defense Force (EADF), Air Defense Command (ADC), assuming jurisdiction of New Castle AFB on 1 September 1950.

On 8 September 1950, the 4th Fighter-Interceptor Wing, equipped with the F-86A Sabre was reassigned to New Castle AFB, giving the airfield an air-superiority mission. The 4th FIW was deployed to Japan on 10 November 1950, with a mission to counter the MiG threat in the skies of Korea. The 4th FIW became the top MiG-killing organization during the Korean War. In addition to the 4th FIW, the 334th Fighter-Interceptor Squadron was activated on the base in 1950, initially flying F-80 Shooting Stars, and in 1952, being replaced by F-94 Starfires. In 1952, the 334th was involved in a UFO incident when its interceptors were scrambled to intercept unknown objects detected flying over Washington, D.C.

On 10 February 1951, the Federalized District of Columbia Air National Guard's 113th Fighter-Interceptor Wing was moved to the base from Andrews AFB, Maryland, and the 113th Air Base Group was designated as the host unit at New Castle AFB. The 113th FIG controlled the Delaware ANG's 142d Fighter-Interceptor Squadron, which operated F-84C Thunderjet interceptors. The 142d was upgraded to the F-94B Starfire on 1 October 1951 and the Air National Guard unit was returned to State of Delaware control on 1 November 1952.

With the departure of the Federalized ANG, ADC activated the 4710th Air Defense Wing on 1 February 1952. With its activation, the base was assigned to the Eastern Air Defense Force's 26th Air Division. In addition, plans were made to elevate the base to a full USAF installation. The 96th Fighter-Interceptor Squadron replaced the 142 FIS on 1 November, inheriting the Starfires used by the Air Guardsmen, and the 525th Air Defense Group became the operational component of the 4710 ADW on 16 February 1953. A second F-94C squadron, the 97th Fighter-Interceptor Squadron, joined the group on 27 March 1953.

In 1955, under "Project Arrow", the 525 ADG was re-designated the 82d Fighter-Interceptor Group. Project Arrow was an ADC program to reactivate notable World War II combat units and the squadrons were redesignated as the 95th and 96th Fighter-Interceptor squadrons, concurrently upgrading to the F-94Cs.

=== Base Housing ===
The base housing which was home to military personnel during the Korean War (1950-1953) was purchased in 1956 by New Castle County, Delaware and reopened for civilian housing. It was designated as Airport Villa, Delaware, and remained a viable neighborhood from 1956 to about 1982 when it was demolished to make room for government buildings.

=== Delaware Air National Guard ===
In 1957, it was announced that Air Defense Command would be reducing its forces at New Castle AFB, with the air defense mission at the base being turned over to the Delaware Air National Guard. The 96th and 97th FIS were inactivated on 30 November, with the 82d FIG being inactivated on 8 January 1958.

The base was redesignated an Air National Guard facility and renamed New Castle Air National Guard Base, with the facility being turned over to Delaware state control. New Castle ANGB came under the control of the 142nd Fighter-Bomber Squadron, which flew F-86F Sabres. On 10 November 1958 the unit was redesignated the 142nd Tactical Fighter Squadron and was reassigned from Air Defense Command to Tactical Air Command (TAC).

On 7 April 1962, the Delaware Air National Guard enlarged to "group status" as the 166th Air Transport Group and was reassigned from the Tactical Air Command to the Military Air Transport Service (MATS). The Delaware Air National Guard gave up its F-86 jets for the four engine C-97 Stratocruiser +. On 22 October 1962 a new unit "142nd Aeromedical Evacuation Flight," was added to the Delaware Air National Guard.

During the period from 1964 to 1974, the Delaware Air National Guard flew missions to Vietnam. In September 1965, only three years after receiving the C-97, the Delaware Air National Guard received the McCallister Trophy as the Air National Guard Outstanding Transport Unit. In 1966, operational claimancy shifted to Military Airlift Command (MAC) following MATS redesignation as MAC.

On 9 April 1968, the Delaware Air National Guard was called to state duty to quell civil disturbance and violence in the city of Wilmington, Delaware. The unit was released from state duty after several weeks. However, many individuals remained on state duty through 20 January 1969.

On 12 May 1971 the Delaware ANG changed its name from the 166th Military Airlift Group to the 166th Tactical Airlift Group and replaced its C-97s with C-130A "Hercules" prop-jet cargo plane, and began transition from the Military Airlift Command back to the Tactical Airlift Command. This would change again in 1975, from TAC back to the MAC, when TAC transferred all of its C-130 units to MAC.

During the period 16 August 1990 through October 1990, three aircraft, with supporting crews and many volunteers of the Delaware Air National Guard, participated in Operation Desert Shield. On 25 January 1991 selected units of the Delaware Air National Guard were activated to Federal status for the Persian Gulf War known as "Operation Desert Storm," (8 planes with crews and maintenance and support personnel.) A majority of the unit was stationed at Al Kharj Air Base, Saudi Arabia. Over 150 personnel deployed to six other locations in Europe and two stateside bases. On 30 June 1991, the units/personnel were released from active duty performed in support of the Persian Gulf War.

Another name change occurred on 16 March 1992 when the 166th Tactical Airlift Group (166 TAG) was redesignated the 166th Airlift Group (166 AG) and the 142nd Tactical Airlift Squadron (142 TAS) was redesignated the 142nd Airlift Squadron (142 AS). In conjunction, the unit's gaining command, Military Airlift Command (MAC) was redesignated the Air Mobility Command (AMC).

In the mid-1990s, claimancy of the 166 AG shifted from AMC to Air Combat Command (ACC). Shortly thereafter, New Castle ANGB appeared on the Base Realignment and Closure (BRAC) Commission list in a context which would have effectively grounded the 166th Airlift Wing. Further, New Castle ANGB was among those targeted for closure by the Pentagon effective in May 2005. However, by the late 1990s, a reversal in the fate of the base had been realized and in excess of $130 million in Federal funds had been allocated for capital projects for base improvement.

On 1 April 1997 the operational gaining command of the Delaware Air National Guard changed again from Air Combat Command and back to the Air Mobility Command (AMC).

=== Major units assigned ===
- Delaware Air National Guard, 1946 – present
- 328th Troop Carrier Squadron, 1946-1949
- 512th Troop Carrier Group, 1949–1951; 1952-1958
- 4th Fighter-Interceptor Wing, 1950
- 113th Fighter-Interceptor 1951-1952
- 4710th Air Defense Wing, 1952-1957
- 525th Air Defense Group, 1952-1955
- 82d Fighter-Interceptor Group, 1955-1957

== See also ==
- Aerospace Defense Command Fighter Squadrons
- Delaware World War II Army Airfields
- Air Transport Command
