= Hugh T. Broomall =

United States Air Force general

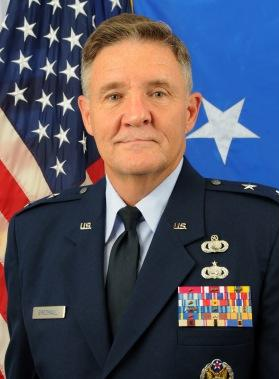
- Major General Hugh T. Broomall
- Born: August 18, 1948 (age 78); Wilmington, Delaware
- Military career
- Allegiance: United States
- Branch: United States Air Force; Delaware Air National Guard
- Service years: 1967–2012
- Rank: Major general
- Commands: Delaware Air National Guard; 166 Th Support Group
- Awards: Air Force Distinguished Service Medal; Legion of Merit (2)

Major General Hugh T. Broomall (born August 18, 1948) is a retired senior officer of the United States Air Force and Delaware Air National Guard who served as the Special Assistant to the Director, Air National Guard. He was responsible for strategy development, state and federal liaison, inter-agency coordination and special studies supporting the one hundred and six thousand Air National Guard members nationwide.

== Early life and education ==
Broomall was born in Wilmington, Delaware, on 18 August 1948. He graduated from Salesianum School in 1966. He attended Delaware Technical and Community College and received a Bachelor of Science degree in business management from Wilmington University in 1985. He went on to earn a master's degree in both human resources and public administration from Wilmington University in 1996. Broomall attended the United States Army War College in 1999. He then went on to earn his doctorate in 2015 from Wilmington University.

== Military career ==
In March 1967, Broomall completed basic training at Lackland Air Force Base, Texas. Broomall received Air Force Administrative Specialist training in Amarillo Air Force Base, Texas, and then returned to the Delaware Air National Guard performing administrative duties for the 166th Maintenance Squadron as a technician. In 1971 he attended the Air Force Communications Operations Course, Sheppard Air Force Base, Texas, and accepted the position of Non-Commissioned Officer in Charge of the 166th Communications Flight.

In November 1974, Broomall was commissioned as a second lieutenant through the Academy of Military Science at McGhee Tyson Air National Guard Base, Tennessee. In April 1975 he completed the Air Force Basic Survival Course, Fairchild Air Force Base, Washington. In July 1975 he completed the Department of Defense Armed Forces Air Intelligence Officer Course at Lowry AFB, Colorado and returned as the Air Intelligence Officer. During this tour he completed education in Air Force Intelligence Service, Soviet Military Power Training, Washington, D.C.; United States Air Force Tactical Air Warfare Training, Battle Staff Management, United States Air Force Special Operations School and Latin American Orientation at Hurlburt Field, Florida. Broomall completed Squadron Officer School in 1977, Air Command and Staff College in 1982, National Security Management Course, National Defense University, Washington, D.C. in 1985. From May 1990 to October 1992 he was the Deputy Commander for Support, 166th Tactical Airlift Group. Between assignments he was the Commander 166th Support Group from October 1992 to October 2000. During his tenure he completed courses in administration at the Office of Personnel Management.

From January to November 1997, Broomall served in the Congressional Fellowship Program to the U.S. Senator William V. Roth, Jr. As a congressional fellow he served as a primary military staff officer supporting the United States Senate North Atlantic Treaty Organization (NATO) Observer Group. He graduated from the U.S. Army War College, Resident Course, Carlisle Barracks, Pennsylvania in 1999. In October 2000, he was appointed the United States Property and Fiscal Officer for the Delaware National Guard.

From May 2004 to August 2010, Broomall served as Assistant Adjutant General-Air, Delaware National Guard. In 2009 he attended the Senior Executive Seminar, George C. Marshall European Center for Security Studies, Garmisch-Partenkirchen, Germany and the Senior Executives in National and International Security program at the Harvard Kennedy School. General Broomall was appointed as the Air National Guard of the U.S. Deputy Chief of Staff for Logistics in 2009. In this role he was responsible for logistics for the ANG 90 flying units with 1100 aircraft, and 106000 personnel.

Broomall was promoted to Major General on September 18, 2010, and was appointed as Special Assistant to the Director, Air National Guard, Assistant to the Director, Air National Guard, and Assistant to the Secretary of the Air Force. He was the first general officer in the Delaware Air National Guard who had non-prior active duty military service and one of the few to emerge from the enlisted ranks.

== Personal ==
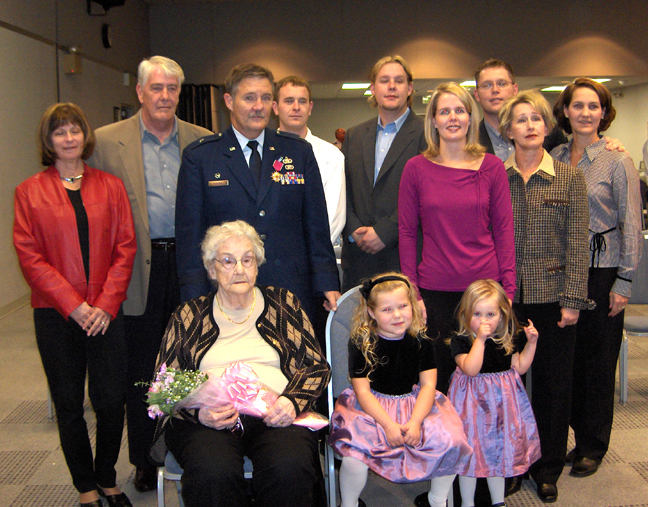
Broomall's family, taken during his promotion to brigadier general on 7 November 2004

Broomall and his wife Christy are residents of Newark, Delaware.

== Honors ==
In 2011, Broomall was inducted into the Salesianum School Alumni Hall of Fame. Inducted into the Delaware Aviation Hall of Fame in October 2022. Named the Wilmington University’s 1st Distinguished Alumnae in 2022.

== Dates of rank ==
Insignia	Rank	Dates
	Second Lieutenant	21 Nov 1974
	First Lieutenant	13 Mar 1977
	Captain	20 May 1979
	Major	7 Jun 1983
	Lieutenant Colonel	20 Jun 1990
	Colonel	30 Jul 1999
	Brigadier General	8 Oct 2004
	Major General	15 Aug 2010

== Awards and decorations ==
Air Force Distinguished Service Medal
Legion of Merit with oak leaf cluster
Meritorious Service Medal with two oak leaf clusters
Air Force Commendation Medal with two oak leaf clusters
Air Force Achievement Medal
Air Force Outstanding Unit Award
Air Force Organizational Excellence Award
Air Reserve Forces Meritorious Service Medal with oak leaf cluster
National Defense Service Medal with bronze service star
Global War on Terrorism Service Medal
Air Force Longevity Service Award with one silver and four bronze oak leaf clusters
Armed Forces Reserve Medal with gold and bronze hourglass devices
Air Force Training Ribbon with oak leaf cluster

Delaware National Guard

Conspicuous Service Cross with three award stars
Distinguished Service Medal
Medal for Military Merit with award numeral 5
National Defense Service Ribbon with award numeral 2
Medal for Service in Aid to Civil Authority with award numeral 5
