= Delaware Air National Guard =

- Active: 1 July 1946 - present
- Country: United States
- Allegiance: Delaware
- Branch: Air National Guard
- Type: State militia, military reserve force
- Role: "To meet state and federal mission responsibilities."
- Part of: Delaware National Guard; United States National Guard Bureau; National Guard
- Garrison/HQ: Delaware Air National Guard, 2600 Spruance Drive, New Castle, Delaware, 19720

Commanders
- Civilian leadership: President Donald Trump (Commander-in-Chief); Gary A. Ashworth (Secretary of the Air Force); Governor Matt Meyer (Governor of the State of Delaware)
- State military leadership: Brigadier General Michael R. Berry Adjutant General, Brigadier General Jason S. Christman Assistant Adjutant General - Air

Aircraft flown
- Transport: Lockheed C-130 Hercules

The Delaware Air National Guard (DE ANG) is the aerial militia of the State of Delaware, United States of America. It is, along with the Delaware Army National Guard, an element of the Delaware National Guard as well as a reserve of the United States Air Force.

As state militia units, the units in the Delaware Air National Guard are not in the normal United States Air Force chain of command. They are under the jurisdiction of the governor of Delaware through the office of the Delaware Adjutant General unless they are federalized by order of the president of the United States. The Delaware Air National Guard is headquartered at New Castle Air National Guard Base, and its commander was Brigadier General Carol A. Timmons.

The Delaware Air National Guard is an Air Reserve Component of the United States Air Force. Delaware ANG units are trained and equipped by the Air Force and are operationally gained by a major command of the USAF if federalized. In addition, the Delaware Air National Guard forces are assigned to Air Expeditionary Forces and are subject to deployment tasking orders along with their active duty and Air Force Reserve counterparts in their assigned cycle deployment window.

Along with their federal obligations, as state militia units, the Delaware ANG is subject to activation by order of the governor to provide protection of life and property, and preserve peace, order and public safety. State missions include disaster relief in times of earthquakes, hurricanes, floods and forest fires, search and rescue, protection of vital public services, and support to civil defense.

The Delaware Air National Guard consists of the 166th Airlift Wing. It traces its history to the establishment of the 142d Fighter Squadron on 1 July 1946. It operates the Lockheed C-130H Hercules. It is stationed at New Castle Air National Guard Base, and when mobilized is commanded by Air Mobility Command. Currently, the Delaware Air National Guard is composed of 1,162 airmen.

== History ==
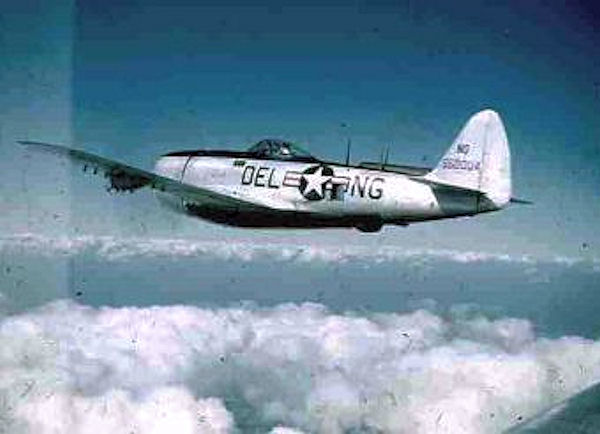
A P-47N of the 142d Fighter Squadron, 1947

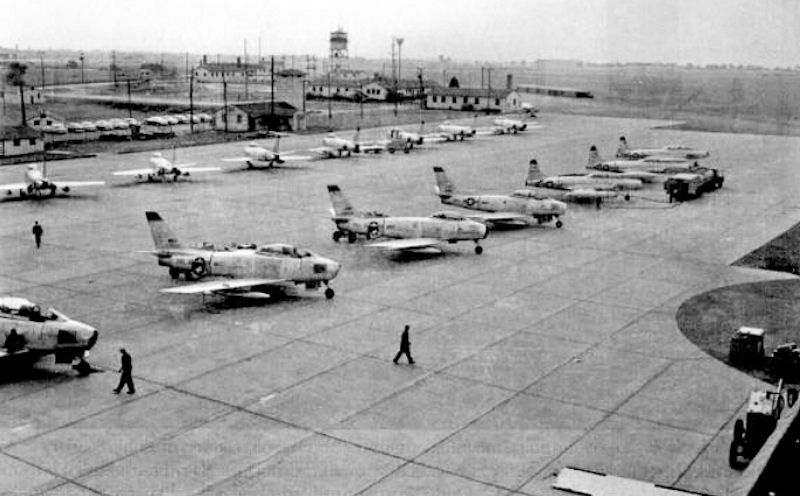
F-86A Sabres of the 142d Fighter-Bomber Squadron at New Castle County Airport, 1954

On 6 Sept 1946 the 142d Fighter Squadron, Delaware Air National Guard stood up with an authorized strength of 49 officers and 263 enlisted men. The actual strength on founding day was 15 officers, one warrant officer and 36 enlisted men.

=== Korea ===
During the Korean War, the entire Delaware Air National Guard was ordered to active duty, and though the 142nd Fighter Squadron remained at New Castle County Airport, its pilots were all rotated to the Far East and most saw combat against Russian-built jets in what came to be known as MiG Alley over Korea.

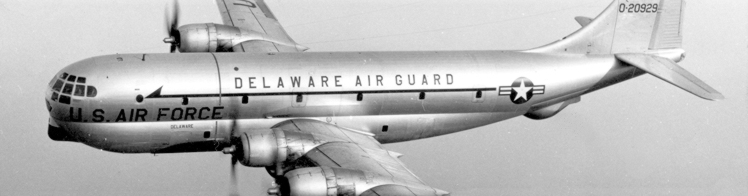
A C-97G of the 166th Military Airlift Group, 1960s

=== Vietnam ===
In the Vietnam War, the Delaware Air National Guard began a regular schedule of cargo flights to Vietnam in late 1965 and operated several each month, in addition to its regular flights to Europe and the Caribbean. The Air Guard carried 60% of the cargo it would be expected to carry if it were an active unit in Federal service.

Brig. Gen. William "Bill" Spruance (1916–2011), a founding member of the Delaware Air Guard, received the first Air Force Distinguished Service Medal given to a reserve officer for his work Vietnam. In 1961, after a near fatal plane crash as passenger in a T-33, Brig. Gen. Spruance selflessly devoted his time, knowledge and experience in an effort to improve flying and crash survival techniques. In 1968 during one of his three trips to Vietnam he gave over 100 presentations to over 10,000 people, at 58 bases, in 60 days.

=== Persian Gulf ===
During the 1991 Gulf War, the Headquarters 166th Tactical Airlift Group, 166th Consolidated Aircraft Maintenance Squadron, and the 142nd Tactical Airlift Squadron were activated in January 1991 involving over 275 Air Guard members. Shortly thereafter, members of the 166th Tactical Clinic were also called upon, bringing the total Air Guard involvement to over 350. All eight C-130 Hercules aircraft were deployed with the Air Guard to the Persian Gulf. The Air Guard merged with the 1670th Tactical Airlift Group (Provisional) at Prince Sultan Air Base (Al Kharj), part of the largest composite U.S. Air Force wing in the entire Persian Gulf area. The unit flew missions carrying personnel and fuel bladders critical to destroying the Iraqi Republican Guard. They were also one of the first crews that flew into Kuwait International Airport to begin rebuilding. In May, they moved a significant portion of the Shiite Muslim refugees to a camp in Saudi Arabia. In January and February personnel from the 166th Civil Engineering Squadron were also tasked with the 100% enlargement of the mortuary facility at Dover Air Force Base.

Brig. Gen. (then Lieutenant Colonel) Ernest Talbert served in combat zones in Southwest Asia as a C-130 pilot in support of Operation Desert Storm. On 11 Nov 2005 he became the first African-American general in the history of the Delaware National Guard. Upon his retirement as Chief of Staff, Headquarters, Delaware Air National Guard on 11 Jan 2009, Brig. Gen. Talbert received the honorary rank of major general. Maj. Gen. Hugh T. Broomall, Special Assistant to the Director, Air National Guard, spoke of General Talbert's military career of 36 years, 30 of which were in the Delaware Guard:

Ernie Talbert's career is the clearest proof we have in the Delaware National Guard that outstanding performance merits ever higher positions of leadership. Delaware and the nation should be proud of General Talbert's career contributions, including his mentoring of dozens of Airmen, his wartime combat service and leadership, and his steadfast devotion to those who serve in the Delaware National Guard and wear the uniform of the U.S. Military. General Talbert has upheld his oath to support and defend the Constitution of the United States and the Constitution of the State of Delaware against all enemies, foreign and domestic.

The Delaware Air National Guard units returned on 31 May 1991.

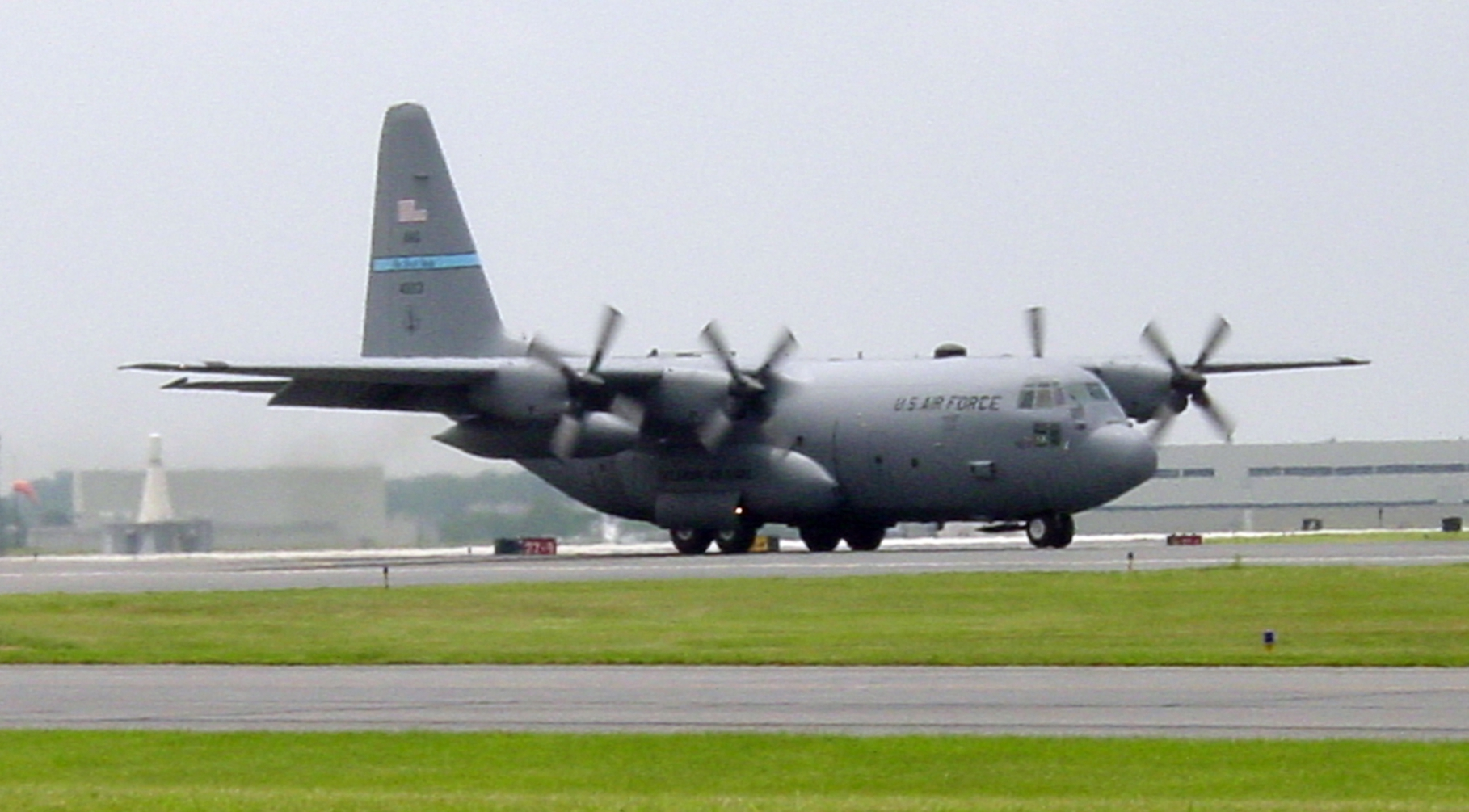
A C-130H of the 142nd Airlift Squadron, 166th Airlift Wing at New Castle ANGB, 2008

=== Afghanistan ===
The Delaware Air National Guard was called upon again during the Afghanistan War. Its units have deployed to the Afghan region several times since 2001. In November 2004 Lieut. Col. (then Major) Patrick Houtman received the Distinguished Flying Cross for taking evasive action at low altitude after a surface-to-air missile (SAM) was launched against his C-130 aircraft. Lieut. Col. Houtman was the first Delaware Air National Guard member to receive this decoration. Lieut. Col. Gregory Carr and Master Sgt. Thomas Michaels of the 142nd Airlift Squadron were awarded the Air Force Combat Action Medal for active participation in combat action, having been personally present and under direct enemy fire on 26 Sept 2004. On that date they were carrying Afghan and US VIP's on a classified mission when they were engaged by multiple sources of ground fire. In April 2008, Staff Sgt. Aaron Weber, Staff Sgt. Aaron Sweeney and Staff Sgt. David Gazzara received the Air Force Combat Action Medal for being engaged by enemy forces while supporting Operation Enduring Freedom. These three Airmen are the first Delaware Air National Guard ground personnel to receive the newly created Air Force Combat Action Medal.

As the deputy commander of the 455th Expeditionary Operations Group, 455th Air Expeditionary Wing, Bagram Air Base, Afghanistan, Brig. Gen. (then Colonel) Carol Timmons received the Bronze Star for meritorious achievement during period of 3 May 2008 to 3 Sept 2008. On 14 May 2011 she was promoted to brigadier general and became the first federally recognized female general officer in the history of the Delaware Air National Guard. Effective 1 Jan 2012 Brig. Gen. Timmons was assigned as the Assistant Adjutant General, Delaware Air National Guard, succeeding Brig. Gen. John Merritt who retired after 43 years of service. The change of command ceremony on 8 Jan 2012 was attended by U.S. Sen. (former Governor) Tom Carper and U.S. Sen. Chris Coons. Sen. Coons, an honorary commander of the 166th Air Wing of the Delaware Air National Guard, thanked both Brig. Gen. Merritt and Brig. Gen. Timmons for their service.

=== Iraq ===
While deployed to Ali Air Base, Iraq with the Delaware Air National Guard's 166th Airlift Wing in 2010, Col. Dennis Hunsicker, the deputy commander of the 407th Air Expeditionary Group, following a presidential directive to reduce the American military presence in that country, helped facilitate the drawdown designed to responsibly shift the Air Force mission from a combat posture to one of advice and assistance.

=== Kuwait ===
The 166th Civil Engineer Squadron (CES) of the Delaware Air National Guard served in several bases in Southwest Asia including Ali Al Salem Air Base, Kuwait دولة الكويت with the 386th Expeditionary Civil Engineer Squadron, 386th Air Expeditionary Wing. Led by Maj Elias Danucalov, Maj Kevin Canning, and CMSgt Ron Marandola, they performed base maintenance, engineering operations, major repairs, maintenance, construction management, explosive ordnance disposal, and emergency management planning. Base engineering work was performed by skilled craftsman such as electricians, plumbers, HVAC specialists, heavy equipment operators, engineering assistants, liquid fuels management, utilities, pest management, and specialists in structures, emergency management, fire protection, explosive ordnance disposal (EOD) and force protection. For their superb work and performance, the deployed members of the 166 CES earned the Meritorious Unit Award. In addition, several members individually received the Air Force Achievement Medal and the Air Force Commendation Medal.

=== Kyrgyzstan ===
Col. Karl Kromer, in support of Operation Enduring Freedom received the Bronze Star for his service in the Republic of Kyrgyzstan Кыргызстан. As the commander of the 376th Expeditionary Maintenance Group, 376th Air Expeditionary Wing from November 2003 to March 2004 he led a team of 170 aircraft maintainers in the upkeep of six C-130 and seven KC-135 aircraft. Those aircraft generated more than 1,600 combat sorties and more than 4,700 hours flying time. The group was responsible for transporting 4,300 tons of critical combat supplies supporting Operation Mountain Resolve, Mountain Blizzard and Mountain Avalanche. His aircraft achieved a 99% departure reliability rate. Only three flights out of 450 were cancelled due to maintenance issues. On Veteran's Day 11 Nov 2004 he was presented the medal by Lt. Governor John Carney and Maj. Gen. Francis D. Vavala, Adjutant General, Delaware National Guard. Maj. Gen. Vavala said at the event, "Colonel Kromer's unswerving devotion to duty proved vital to sustaining the momentum of decisive combat operations and resulted in the swift defeat of enemy forces. All of Delaware should be proud of him."

=== Hurricane Katrina ===
On 31 Aug 2005 "Task Force Delaware" composed of the 166th Security Forces of the Delaware Air National Guard and the 153rd Military Police Company (United States) of the Delaware Army National Guard deployed to Gulfport, Mississippi in response to Hurricane Katrina. Two C-130 Aircraft carried around 75 troops, the first of about 400 troops from Delaware. The Delaware Guard under the direction of Joint Task Force Katrina and the Mississippi National Guard, operated 24-hour traffic control points, roving patrols, presence patrols as well as performing humanitarian operations in the Gulfport, Long Beach, Biloxi and Pass Christian areas. Humanitarian aid was distributed such as potable water, ice and MRE's (Meal, Ready-to-Eat). Over a dozen C-130 transport missions brought Civil Engineers from the 166 Civil Engineer Squadron (CES), communications specialists, ground and air medical personnel, fire fighters (166CES) and other skilled personnel who contributed to relief efforts in almost a dozen cities in Mississippi as well as Louisiana in the city of New Orleans, in areas north of Lake Pontchartrain such as the towns of Slidell and Hammond. Participants of these relief efforts received the Humanitarian Service Medal.

=== Hurricane Gustav ===
When Hurricane Gustav hit Louisiana on 1 Sept 2008 Delaware was one of the first four states to respond. The Delaware Air National Guard evacuated 285 hospital patients from potentially dangerous areas in Louisiana and Texas. The Delaware Air and Army National Guard sent two Black Hawk helicopters, communications and search and rescue specialists, as well as a Joint Enabling Team (JET).

=== Operation Jump Start ===
On 18 Aug 2007 46 members of the 166th Civil Engineer Squadron returned from a two-week deployment to areas south of Yuma, Arizona in support of Operation Jump Start. Working in two teams directly across from the border of Mexico the 166th Civil Engineer Squadron installed metal fence panels eight feet wide and 15 feet tall which needed to be welded together. On the first day the teams installed 91 panels, breaking the previous daily record of 35 set by other National Guard troops. Over two work weeks the teams installed 1,100 panels along a 9,000 foot border. The unit installed four 50 foot tall light poles in one day, exceeding the normal installation rate of two light poles per day. Other important support tasks were performed such as road maintenance. Major Elias Danucalov summed up the efforts of the 166th Civil Engineer Squadron, "Our people were satisfied that they could contribute something to national security."

== Notable members ==
- Jamie Wyeth, contemporary realist painter.

== See also ==
- Delaware State Guard
- Delaware Wing Civil Air Patrol
