= Wilmington Airport (Delaware) =

Public airport in Delaware, United States

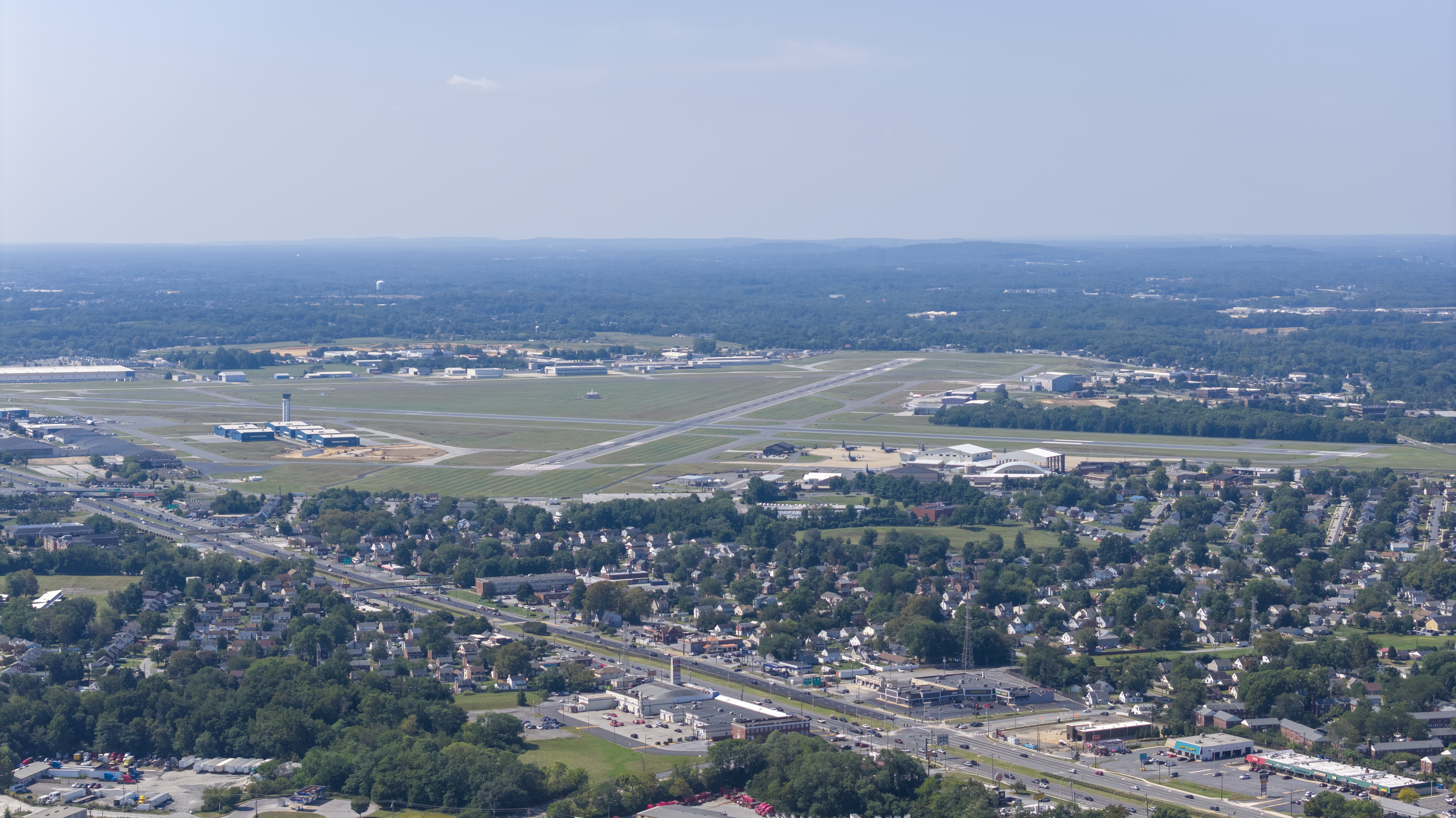
- Wilmington Airport from the northeast in September 2025
- IATA: ILG; ICAO: KILG; FAA LID: ILG; WMO: 72418

Summary
- Airport type: Public
- Owner: New Castle County, Delaware
- Operator: Delaware River and Bay Authority
- Serves: Wilmington, Delaware
- Location: unincorporated New Castle County
- Operating base for: Avelo Airlines
- Time zone: UTC−05:00 (-5)
  - Summer (DST): UTC−04:00 (-4)
- Elevation AMSL: 80 ft (24 m)
- Coordinates: 39°40′43″N 075°36′24″W
- Website: www.flyilg.com

Maps
- FAA airport diagram
- Interactive map of Wilmington Airport

Runways
Direction	Length		Surface
Direction	ft	m	Surface
09/27	7,275	2,217	Asphalt
01/19	7,012	2,137	Asphalt
14/32	4,602	1,403	Asphalt

Statistics (2022)
- Passenger enplanements (2023): 133,377
- Aircraft operations (year ending 12/22/2022): 46,057
- Based aircraft: 219
- Source: Federal Aviation Administration

Wilmington Airport (IATA: ILG, ICAO: KILG, FAA LID: ILG), formerly known as New Castle Airport is an airport located in unincorporated New Castle County, Delaware, near Wilmington, Delaware. Owned by New Castle County and operated under a lease agreement with the Delaware River and Bay Authority, it is five miles (8 km) south of Wilmington and about 30 miles (50 km) from Philadelphia, Pennsylvania. It is included in the Federal Aviation Administration (FAA) National Plan of Integrated Airport Systems for 2017–2021, in which it is categorized as a non-hub primary commercial service facility. Currently, it is the only airport in Delaware that serves regular scheduled commercial flights.

Federal Aviation Administration records say the airport had 642 passenger boardings (enplanements) in calendar year 2011 and 1,064 passenger boardings in 2012. Thanks to the inauguration of service by Frontier Airlines, 2013 enplanements increased to 52,456, though Frontier ceased its Delaware service in 2015. Frontier resumed service to Wilmington in February 2021 but discontinued service again in June 2022. Avelo Airlines has since started service to Wilmington in February 2023 with enplanements increasing to 133,377 in 2023.

== History ==
The airport opened during World War II, when it was named the Wilmington Airport and the Greater Wilmington Airport. While under construction, the facility was taken over by the United States Army Air Forces during the war and became New Castle Army Air Base. Its mission was to facilitate the movement of aircraft to the British and other Allies. Members of the historic Women Air Service Pilots (WASP) served as test and ferry pilots and towed targets for student gunners. There is a statue today at the airport that honors the women of the WASP that served their country in the time of need.

After the war ended, control of the airport was returned to civil authorities. A joint-use agreement was made between the United States Air Force and New Castle County authorities for a portion of the airport being retained for an Air National Guard Base. Trans World Airlines (TWA) operated a large overhaul base for its overseas planes at the airport until 1957, when the airline moved the base to the Kansas City Overhaul Base, which itself became the basis for today's Kansas City International Airport.

Wilmington hosted the state of Delaware's first airline flights when TWA and American Airlines arrived in late 1947.

From 1959 to 1971, the airport hosted the main operational base of Capitol International Airways, a supplemental air carrier, which had a fleet of DC-8 aircraft engaged in charter flights.

By 1967, Eastern Airlines was operating Douglas DC-9 jet service into the airport with nonstop flights to Newark Airport, Philadelphia Airport, and Washington, D.C.'s National Airport as well as direct flights to Atlanta and Charlotte.

Allegheny Airlines also served Wilmington. In 1968, AL had four daily departures using their F-27s nonstop to Philadelphia, Washington's National Airport, Atlantic City, and Trenton. In 1969, Allegheny no longer flew F-27s and changed the four departures to Convair 580 prop-jets with two to DCA, one to PHL, and one to ACY.

United Airlines, while on a campaign to serve all 50 states, began service to Wilmington in 1984 with one-stop jet flights to Chicago. Service continued through 1987.

Famed aviator Charles Lindbergh made a trip from Atlantic City, New Jersey, to Wilmington, Delaware, on October 21, 1927, as part of his triumphant tour of America after his solo trip across the Atlantic Ocean.

=== 1990s to present ===
During five periods since 1990, Delaware has been the only U.S. state without any scheduled commercial airline flights: from 1993 through 1998, again from 2000 to 2006, from April 2008 until June 30, 2013, between April 2015 and February 2021, and from June 2022 to January 2023.

USAir Express carrier Crown Airways provided scheduled service to Parkersburg, West Virginia, briefly beginning in 1992 before its sale to Mesa Airlines in 1994..

In the late 1990s, the county leased the debt-stricken airport to the bi-state Delaware River and Bay Authority (DRBA), operators of the Delaware Memorial Bridge, and Cape May-Lewes Ferry, on a thirty-year lease with the provision that the DRBA may seek up to two additional thirty-year leases. Since taking over operations, the DRBA invested heavily in the airport's infrastructure - upgrading many aging buildings, rehabilitating taxiways and runways, and building numerous new hangars and commercial buildings on the property.

Shuttle America offered scheduled flights out of Wilmington from the airline's founding in November 1998 until February 2000. They flew to Hartford, Buffalo, and Norfolk with 50-seat de Havilland Canada DHC-8 Dash 8-300 turboprops. Shuttle America would eventually discontinue its independent operations and become a commuter affiliate of United Express and Delta Connection.

On June 29, 2006, a Delta Air Lines regional airline affiliate began flights from Atlanta's Hartsfield-Jackson Atlanta International Airport to Wilmington Airport in New Castle County, the first airline service in six years. Delta Connection carrier Atlantic Southeast Airlines flew 50-seat Canadair CRJ regional jets on two daily roundtrip flights. Delta Air Lines ended the Wilmington flights on September 6, 2007, leaving Delaware without any airline service.

On March 8, 2008, Skybus Airlines began Airbus A319 jet flights from Columbus, Ohio, and Greensboro, North Carolina, to Wilmington. Skybus ceased all operations effective April 4, 2008, once again leaving Wilmington Airport without any airline service. As of August 4, 2010, Avis Rent a Car System, LLC, Budget Rent A Car System, Inc., and Cafe Bama were the only tenants in the Main Terminal.

On July 1, 2013, Frontier began Airbus A320 jet service at Wilmington, initially with flights to Denver, Chicago-Midway, Houston-Hobby, Orlando, and Tampa. On June 26, 2013, Frontier announced nonstop jet service to Fort Myers would begin November 16. In June 2015, Frontier Airlines announced that it was ending all service from Wilmington because it was not a profitable operation. Service had actually stopped in April 2015, but at that time, Frontier claimed it was just a seasonal suspension of service.

On January 24, 2020, it was announced that Frontier Airlines has decided to restart service out of Wilmington. The start date was delayed due to the COVID-19 pandemic. Frontier Airlines service between Wilmington and Orlando restarted on February 11, 2021, but ended on June 6, 2022.

On October 20, 2022, Avelo Airlines announced it would be opening a new base at Wilmington-New Castle Airport with the addition of five new nonstop destinations in Florida, which include Orlando, Fort Lauderdale, Fort Myers, Tampa and West Palm Beach. It was reported the agreement with Avelo and DRBA was for five years. All flights began operating out of ILG in February 2023.

In April 2023, the airline announced nine additional routes from Wilmington. Flights were planned to begin that June.

The Delaware Air National Guard Base, located at the Wilmington Airport, was used by former President Joe Biden when he traveled home from Washington, D.C.

On May 29, 2026, Wilmington Airport (ILG) welcomed its one‑millionth passenger since the launch of commercial service by Avelo Airlines in February 2023. The milestone was celebrated by the Delaware River and Bay Authority (DRBA) and Avelo Airlines when inbound Flight 560 from Orlando (MCO) arrived at 12:33 PM. The one‑millionth customer was recognized as John and Cindy Sparco of Newark, Delaware, who were surprised as they deplaned. This achievement came a little over three years after Avelo began operations at ILG and followed a passenger record in the first half of 2025, when the airport served 155,881 travelers.

== Facilities ==
The airport covers 1,250 acres (506 ha) at an elevation of 80 feet (24 m). It has three asphalt runways: 9/27 is 7,275 by 150 feet (2,217 x 46 m); 1/19 is 7,012 by 150 feet (2,137 x 46 m); 14/32 is 4,602 by 150 feet (1,403 x 46 m).

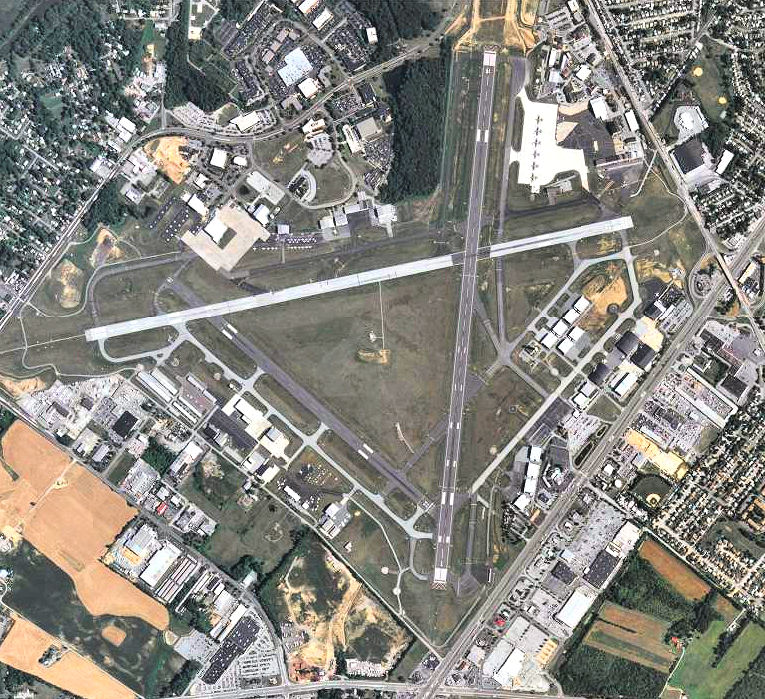
2006 USGS aerial photograph of the airport and its three runways

The airport terminal building has no jet bridges, thus requiring air stairs in order to board and disembark aircraft.

In the year ending December 22, 2022, the airport had 46,057 aircraft operations, average 126 per day: 80% general aviation, 12% military, 8% air taxi, and <1% airline. 219 aircraft were then based at the airport: 94 single-engine, 74 jet, 26 multi-engine, 20 military, and 5 helicopter.

ARFF is supported via Delaware Air National Guard Fire Department Station 33.

flyADVANCED runs an FBO (Fixed Base Operator), Charter flight operation, hangar storage and aircraft management on the field.

== Airline and destinations ==
=== Passenger ===
Airlines	Destinations
Avelo Airlines	Fort Lauderdale, Fort Myers, Lakeland, Orlando, San Juan, Tampa; Seasonal: Daytona Beach, Myrtle Beach, Sarasota, West Palm Beach, Wilmington (NC)

== Ground transportation ==
=== Bus transportation ===
Public transit
System	Route(s)	Refs
DART First State	13, 25	

Tarmac-to-tarmac shuttle
Operator	Destination	Notes	Refs
American Airlines (operated by Landline)	Philadelphia	Passengers check bags & clear security at ILG, and go directly to PHL via motorcoach	

American Airlines announced in July 2024 that it will establish a connecting bus to Philadelphia International Airport from Wilmington Airport. The service is ticketed & operated as an airline flight but will utilize buses, given Philadelphia's close proximity to Wilmington and available connections as a major hub for American Airlines. This airside-to-airside service, which is solely for screened passengers who booked a seat on the route, is operated by American's bus service partner, Landline, on the airline's behalf.

== Statistics ==
=== Passenger numbers ===
Annual passenger traffic statistics, 2014–present
Year	Passengers	Year	Passengers	Year	Passengers	Year	Passengers
2014	103,000	2020	0	2026		2032	
2015	207,000	2021	24,000	2027		2033	
2016	21,000	2022	9,000	2028		2034	
2017	0	2023	262,000	2029		2035	
2018	0	2024	247,000	2030		2036	
2019	0	2025	331,000	2031		2037	

=== Carrier shares ===
Airline Market Shares (August 2025 – July 2026)
Rank	Airline	Passengers	Market Share
1	Avelo	365,000	100%

=== Top destinations ===
Busiest domestic routes from ILG (August 2025 – July 2026)
Rank'	City	Passengers	Airline
1	Orlando, Florida	29,400	Avelo
2	Fort Myers, Florida	25,470	Avelo
3	Tampa, Florida	22,570	Avelo
4	San Juan, Puerto Rico	21,230	Avelo
5	Fort Lauderdale, Florida	20,830	Avelo
6	Lakeland, Florida	15,440	Avelo
7	Daytona Beach, Florida	10,890	Avelo
8	Myrtle Beach, South Carolina	9,110	Avelo
9	West Palm Beach, Florida	6,700	Avelo
10	Wilmington, North Carolina	5,570	Avelo

== Accidents and incidents ==
- On July 20, 1945, a USAF Douglas C-54 on a transition flight crashed crossing the airfield and impacting the ground from a low altitude. All 4 occupants were killed. Cause unknown.
- On November 18, 1947, a Trans World Airlines Lockheed L-049 Constellation on a training flight crashed on final approach to Wilmington short of the runway and burst into flames. All 5 crew were killed.
- On June 16, 1992, a Beechcraft 200 Super King Air operated by Omega Air Inc stalled and crashed into trees on final approach to Wilmington because of engine and compressor turbine blade failure. All 4 occupants (2 crew, 2 passengers) were killed.
- On October 30, 2001, an Aero Vodochody L-39C Albatros caught fire while taxiing in Wilmington. The fire was caused by a ruptured oil line, which resulted in oil spraying onto the APU exhaust and a subsequent fire. The private pilot aboard was not injured.
- On February 25, 2002, a Beechcraft C23 Musketeer experienced a total loss of engine power while on approach to Wilmington. A student and instructor aboard were circling to land on runway 19 after shooting the ILS to runway 1. The engine failed during the circle, and the instructor was unable to finish the engine failure checklist before impact due to the low altitude. The probable cause of the accident was found to be the flight instructor's improper fuel management which resulted in fuel starvation. Both occupants survived.
- On September 3, 2007, a Piper PA-34 Seneca was damaged while landing in Wilmington. After touchdown, the aircraft ballooned and settled back to the runway. Upon settling the windshield broke, and the aircraft bounced again before touching down again. Investigation found that the nose landing gear A frame had impacted the base of the windshield after tearing through the fuselage structure located above the nose landing gear wheel well. The right propeller was also damaged. The cause of the accident was found to be the pilot's improper flare, which resulted in a hard landing.

== See also ==
- List of airports in Delaware
