= 157th Air Refueling Wing =

Unit of the New Hampshire Air National Guard

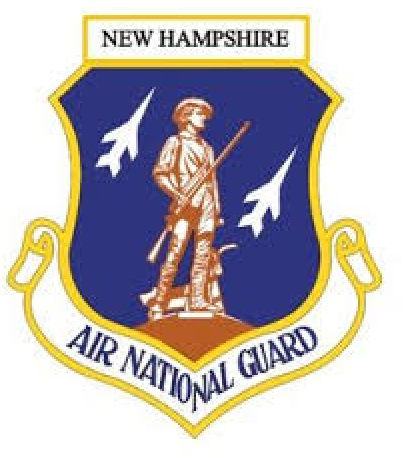
157th Air Refueling Wing

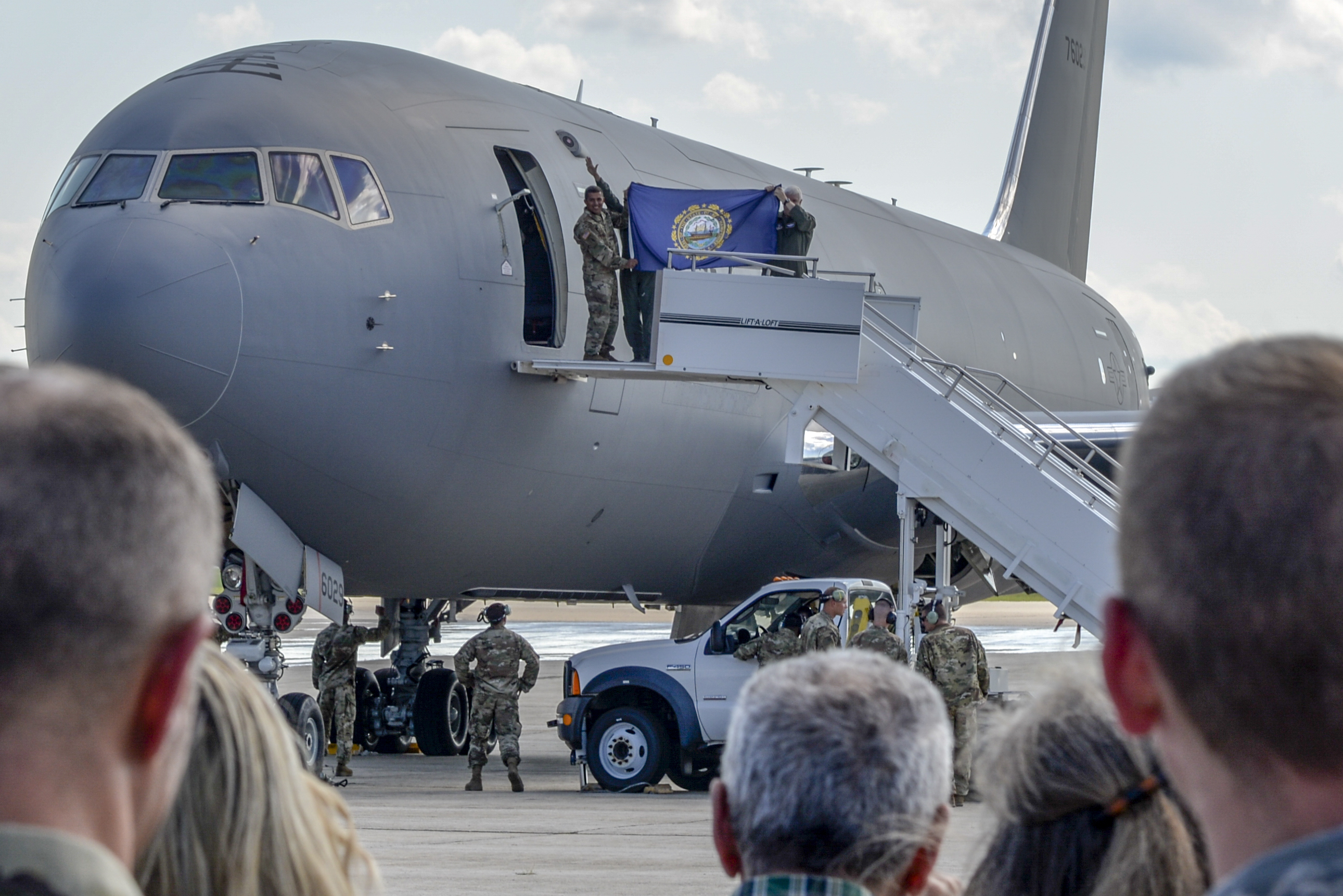
- The first Boeing KC-46A Pegasus to be stationed at Pease arriving on 8 August 2019
- Active: 1942–1946; 1947–1952; 1952–1954; 1954–1956; 1956–present
- Country: United States
- Allegiance: New Hampshire
- Branch: Air National Guard
- Type: Wing
- Role: Aerial refueling
- Part of: New Hampshire Air National Guard
- Garrison/HQ: Pease Air National Guard Base, New Hampshire
- Motto: Live Free or Die

Commanders
- Wing Commander: Colonel Brian Carloni
- Wing Command Chief: CMSgt Kevin Reiter

Insignia
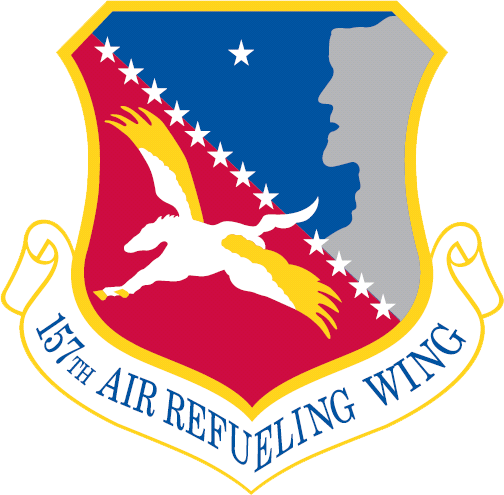
- 157th Air Refueling Wing emblem

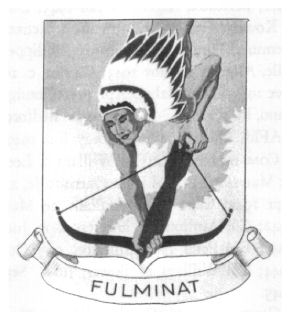
- 311th Bombardment Group emblem (Note: Approved 12 November 1942).

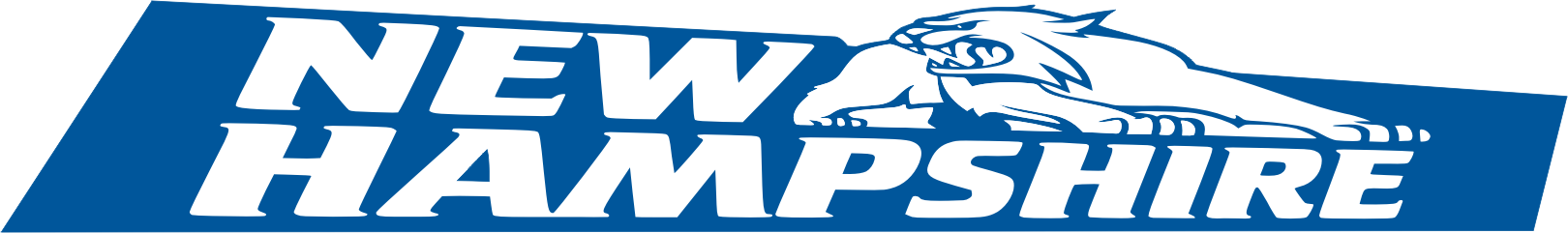
- Tail Stripe

Aircraft flown
- Tanker: KC-46 Pegasus

The 157th Air Refueling Wing is a unit of the New Hampshire Air National Guard, stationed at Pease Air National Guard Base, New Hampshire, United States. If activated to federal service, the Wing is gained by the United States Air Force Air Mobility Command.

== Mission ==
Mission is as follows:

- Federal: "maintain well-trained, well-equipped units available for prompt mobilization during war and provide assistance during national emergencies"
- State: "provides protection of life, property and preserves peace, order and public safety"

== Units ==
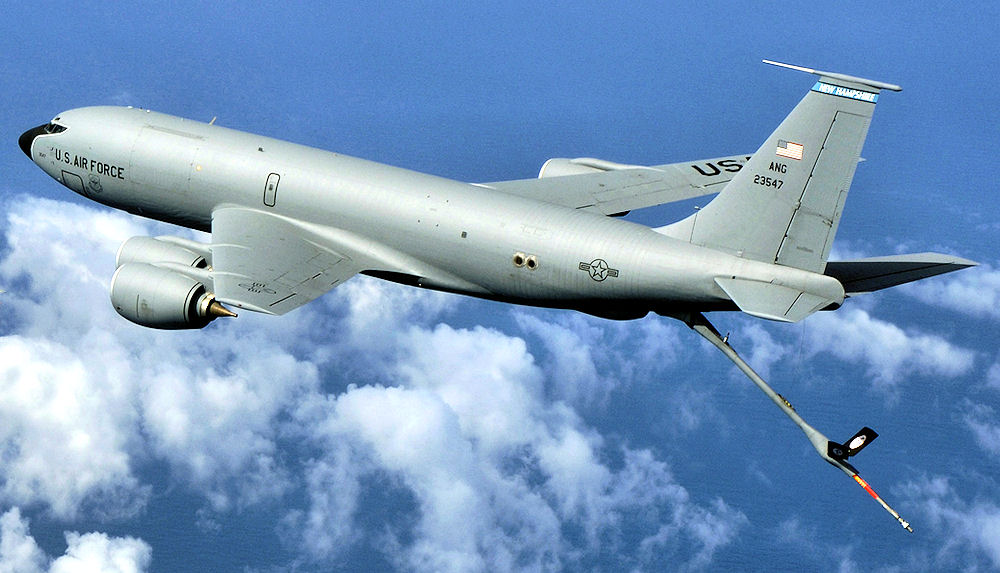
Boeing KC-135R Stratotanker 62-3547 of the 133d Air Refueling Squadron in 2005

The 157th Air Refueling Wing consists of the following units:

- 157th Operations Group
  - 133d Air Refueling Squadron
  - 260th Air Traffic Control Squadron
- 157th Maintenance Group
- 157th Mission Support Group
  - 157th Civil Engineer Squadron
  - 157th Force Support Squadron
  - 157th Security Forces Squadron
  - 157th Logistics Readiness Squadron
  - 157th Communications Flight
- 157th Medical Group
- Wing Staff
  - Command Post, Public Affairs, Airman and Family Readiness Program, Finance, Safety, Environmental Management, Legal Office, Chaplain, Inspector General, Equal Opportunity, Human Resource Advisor

== History ==
The direct predecessor to the 101st Air Refueling Wing is the World War II 311th Fighter Group. The 311th was one of only three groups to use the A-36 Apache dive bomber version of the North American P-51 Mustang. It was created in 1942 as a light bombardment group, training with the Vultee Vengeance, before moving on to the A-36 (and the P-51) when it entered combat in India as part of the Tenth Air Force.

=== World War II ===
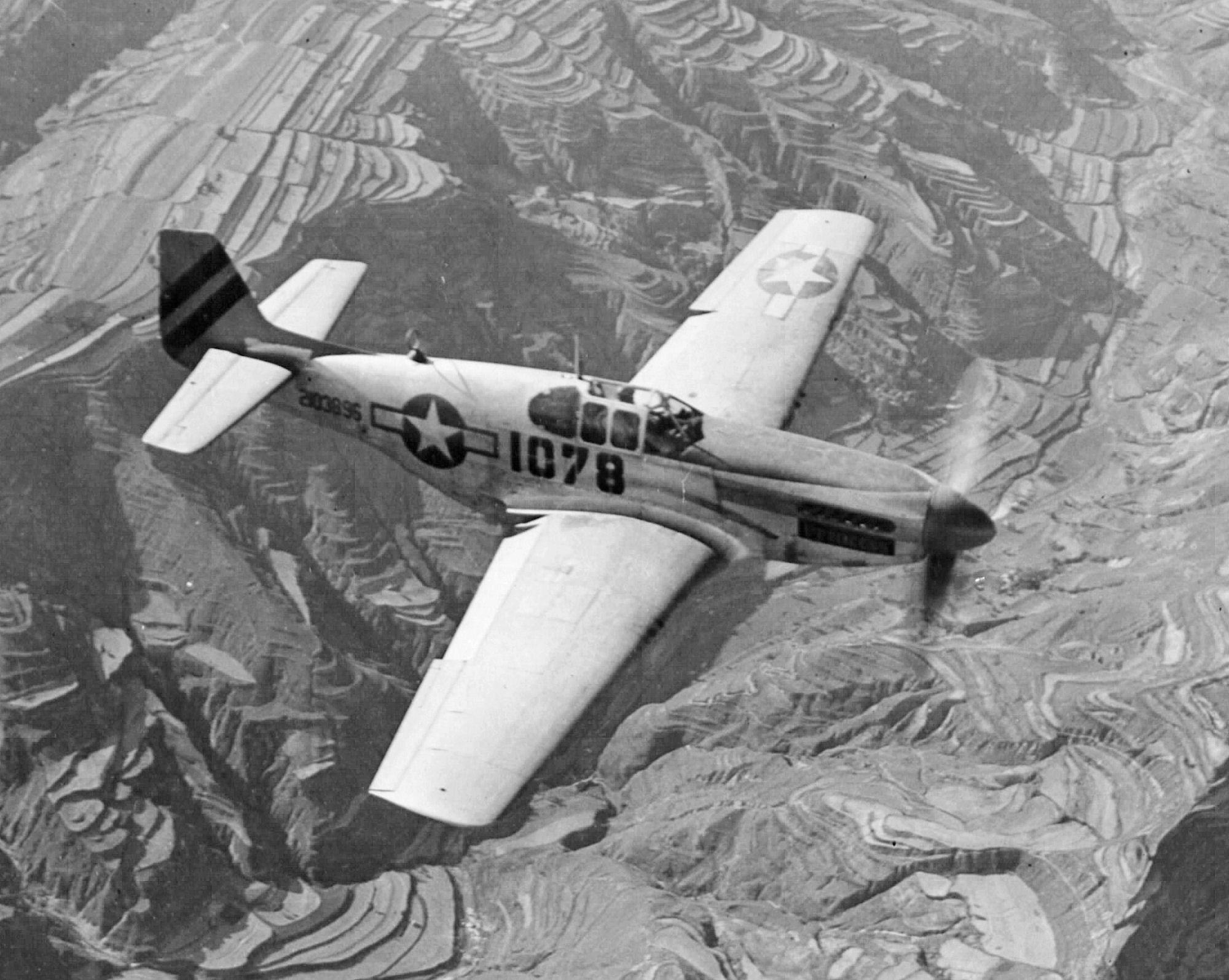
P-51C-10-NT Mustang 42-103896 311th Fighter Group, 14th Air Force Mustang escorting C-47's over China on 24 July 1945

Trained with Vultee V-72 Vengeance aircraft. Moved to India, via Australia, July–September 1943. Assigned to Tenth Air Force. Operating from India and using A-36A Apaches. The unit's aircraft had yellow tails with two black bands, the 530th Fighter Squadron having its diagonal bands sloping from top right to bottom left, while the other two squadrons had theirs either vertical or sloping the opposite way. The red nose was also a squadron marking. Many planes of this group had a girl's name on the nose, but very few had any artwork.

The squadron supported Allied ground forces in northern Burma; covered bombers that attacked Rangoon, Insein, and other targets; bombed enemy airfields at Myitkyina and Bhamo; and conducted patrol and reconnaissance missions to help protect transport planes that flew The Hump route between India and China.

Converted to North American P-51C Mustangs in May 1944. Moved to Burma in July and continued to support ground forces, including Merrill's Marauders; also flew numerous sweeps over enemy airfields in central and southern Burma.

Moved to China in August 1944 and assigned to Fourteenth Air Force. Escorted bombers, flew interception missions, struck the enemy's communications, and supported ground operations, serving in combat until the end of the war. Ferried P-51's from India for the Chinese Air Force in November 1945. Returned to the US in December 1945.

Inactivated in early 1946.

On 1 May 1956 the New Hampshire Air National Guard's 134th Fighter-Interceptor Squadron was authorized to expand to a group level, and the 101st Fighter-Interceptor Group from the Vermont Air National Guard was transferred to New Hampshire state control, being redesignated the 101st Fighter Group (Air Defense), and federally recognized by the National Guard Bureau. The 134th FIS becoming the group's flying squadron. Other squadrons assigned into the group were the 101st Material Squadron, 101st Air Base Squadron, and the 101st USAF Dispensary. The 101st Fighter Group (AD) was assigned to the Maine Air National Guard 101st Air Defense Wing.

=== Maine Air National Guard ===
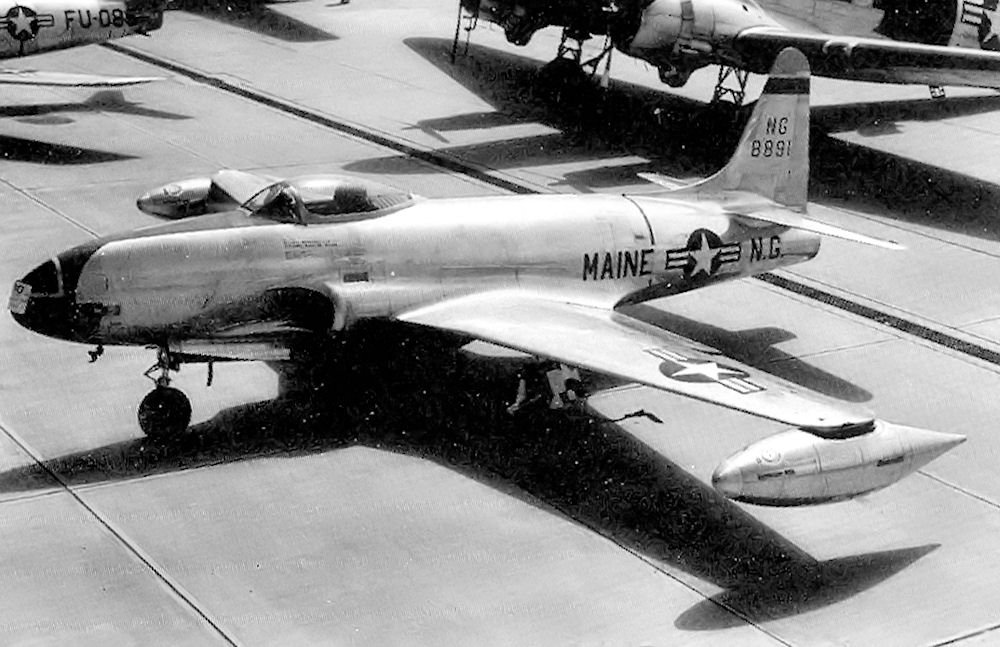
132d Fighter Squadron – Lockheed F-80C Shooting Star 48–891, 1950

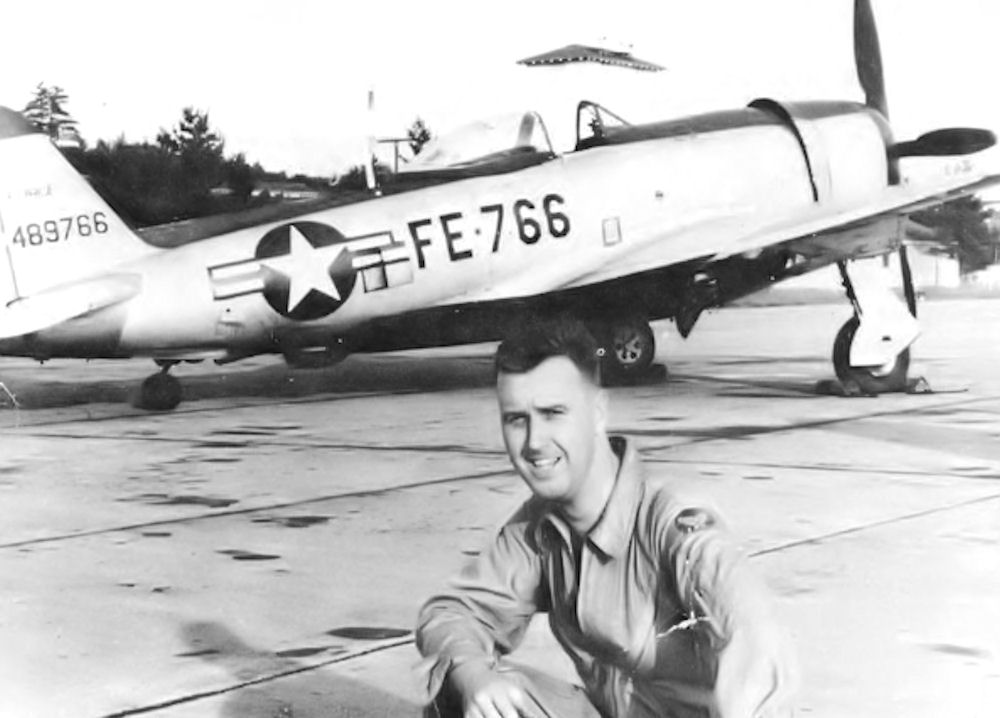
133d Fighter Squadron – Republic F-47D Thunderbolt 44-89766, the first aircraft assigned to the New Hampshire Air National Guard

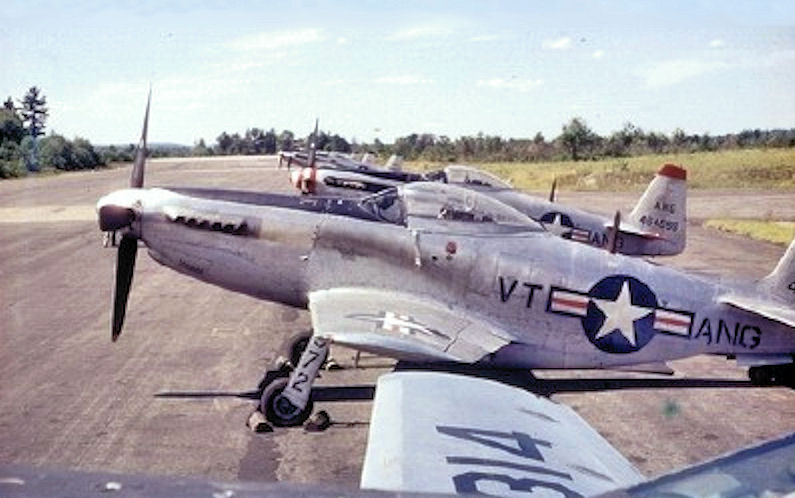
134th Fighter Squadron F-51H Mustangs at Grenier Field, 1950

The wartime 311th Fighter Group was re-designated as the '101st Fighter Group, and was allotted to the Maine Air National Guard, on 24 May 1946. It was organized at Camp Keyes, Augusta, Maine, and was extended federal recognition on 4 April 1947 by the National Guard Bureau. The 101st Fighter Group was bestowed the lineage, history, honors, and colors of the 311th Fighter Group, and all predecessor units. The group was assigned to the Massachusetts ANG 67th Fighter Wing, operationally gained by Continental Air Command.

Upon activation, operational squadrons of the 101st Fighter Group were:

- 132d Fighter Squadron, Maine ANG, Dow Army Airfield, Bangor, Maine
- 133d Fighter Squadron, New Hampshire ANG, Grenier Field, Manchester, New Hampshire
- 134th Fighter Squadron, Vermont ANG, Burlington Airport, Burlington, Vermont.

The three squadrons were all re-designations of the 311th Fighter Group's operational squadrons during World War II. All were initially equipped with F-47D Thunderbolts, with a mission of air defense of their respective states.

In the summer of 1948, the 132d Fighter Squadron replaced their F-47 Thunderbolts with jet F-80C Shooting Stars and were re-designated with the "Jet Propelled" suffix on 1 August. The 134th received Very Long-Range F-51H Mustangs in the summer of 1950.

=== Air Defense Command ===
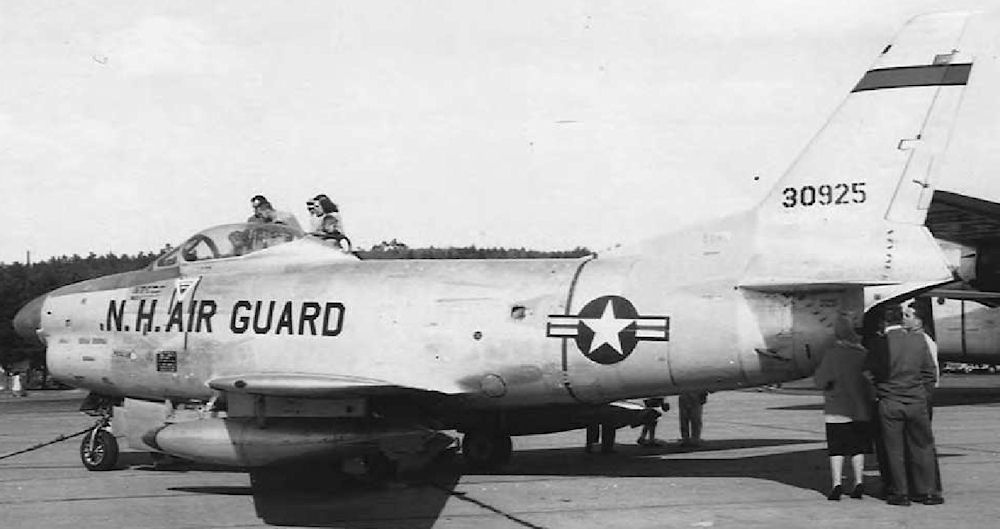
133d FIS North American F-86L, 53-0925, 1959

The unit assumed the F-94 Starfire aircraft of the 134th FIS and the air defense mission of New Hampshire. By April 1958, the 101st counted nearly 700 officers and airmen. It was now re-equipped with 24 F-86L Sabre Interceptor jets, a dedicated swept-wing interceptor which was capable of being directed to intercept targets by Ground Control Interceptor (GCI) radar stations. The rocket-firing aircraft boasted 650 miles per hour (1,050 km/h) speed, superb maneuverability, and a 1,000-mile (1,600 km) range. More than a dozen were in place by May. The old F-94s were shipped to other states for training purposes.

=== Airlift mission ===
On 1 September 1960 the unit was transferred from ADC to the Military Air Transport Service (MATS). The 134th exchanged its recently acquired Sabres for eight Boeing C-97 Stratofreighter aircraft. Organizationally, the 101st Fighter Group (AD) was transferred to the Maine Air National Guard, the 157th Air Transportation Group being established by the National Guard Bureau as a new unit, replacing the 101st. The lineage and history, however, of the 101st Fighter Group (AD) were transferred to the 157th ATS, with the 134th being redesignated as an Air Transport Squadron.

With the transfer of the 101st to Maine, the 157th ATG became one of three groups assigned to the 133d Air Transportation Wing, Minnesota Air National Guard. Completing the organization were the 157th Group Headquarters, the 133d Air Transport Squadron, 157th Air Base Squadron, 157th Consolidated Aircraft Maintenance Squadron, the 157th USAF Dispensary, and State Headquarters.

==== 1961 Berlin Airlift ====
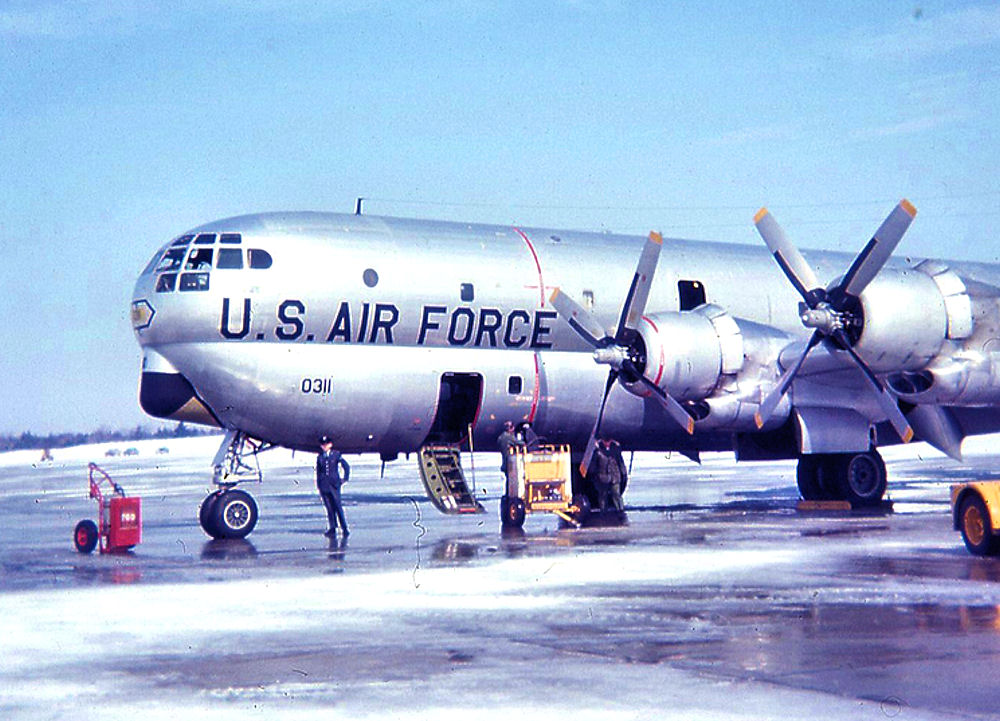
133d ATS C-97G 53-0311 about 1963

On the night of 13 August 1961, the East German government erected barbed wire barriers around the 104-mile (167 km) periphery of West Berlin. Without warning, East Berliners had been denied passage rights to the western part of the city by their own soldiers. In response, President John F. Kennedy federalized several Air National Guard units, including the New Hampshire Air National Guard, and the 133d ATS was placed on active duty. Equipped with eight C-97 aircraft and manned with 675 guardsmen, the unit would stay at Grenier Field during the crisis. But its aircraft and crews ranged throughout the world, touching down at bases in Europe, South America, Alaska, Japan, the Philippines, and Southeast Asia. These missions came in addition to the ongoing ferrying of life-sustaining supplies to West Berlin. The 157th also airlifted elements of the Turkish Army to South Korea and delivered essential communications equipment to South Vietnam.

Typical of the C-97 flights leaving Grenier AFB was one that departed in early November 1961. Its long itinerary started with a stop at Dover AFB, Delaware, then it was on to Lajes Field, Azores; Châteauroux-Déols AB, France; Rhein-Main AB, West Germany; RAF Mildenhall, England; Keflavik Airport, Iceland; Ernest Harmon AFB, Newfoundland, and back to Grenier AFB. This 9,000-plus-mile flight required in excess of 40 hours of flying time and was supported by a crew of eight.

In 11 months, the crisis cooled, and on 31 August 1962 the 900 officers and airmen of the 157th Air Transport Group were returned to State control.

In late 1965, at the behest of the Department of Defense and in concert with other Air National Guard and Reserve units, 157th personnel joined in "Operation Christmas Star", airlifting some 23,000 pounds of gifts to United States forces in South Vietnam. It was a presaging of the unit's active participation in the Vietnam War which would begin in 1966. With all-volunteer aircrews, the three 133d ATS C-97s delivered 23,000 pounds of cargo, completely collected in New Hampshire, then shipped to Saigon and Da Nang between 26 November and 1 December. After Operation Christmas Star, Air National Guard support missions to South Vietnam increased.

==== Move to Pease Air Force Base ====
On 1 January 1966, the Military Air Transport Service was discontinued, being replaced by Military Airlift Command (MAC). With the change of major command designations, the 157th was redesignated as the 157th Military Airlift Group, the 133d as a Military Airlift Squadron. The 157th became part of the 21st Air Force, McGuire Air Force Base, New Jersey. But more dramatic than any previous change, the closure of Grenier AFB meant that the 157th was told to pack up and move to a new home at Pease AFB in Newington, New Hampshire. The closure of Grenier AFB had been the result of Air Force-wide downsizing directed by Secretary of Defense Robert McNamara.

At Pease AFB, the 157th was assigned to buildings on the north side of the base. Like it or not, after 20 years on its own, the 157th was now side by side with Strategic Air Command 509th Bombardment Wing active-duty personnel. At the first drill in February 1966, in the confines of its hangar, the entire 700-man unit received a formal welcome by the 509th. During the ceremony—a reality check of sorts—base representatives explained the installation's regulations, proper wear of uniforms, and other military courtesies.

As the unit settled into a new home, the 133d Aeromedical Evacuation flight was formed. It was composed of 13 flight nurses and 29 airmen serving as medical aide technicians. Working aboard the C-97 Stratofreighter planes assigned to the 133d Military Airlift Squadron, New Hampshire medical crews were assigned to assist transporting patients from Europe and Southeast Asia.

==== Vietnam War ====
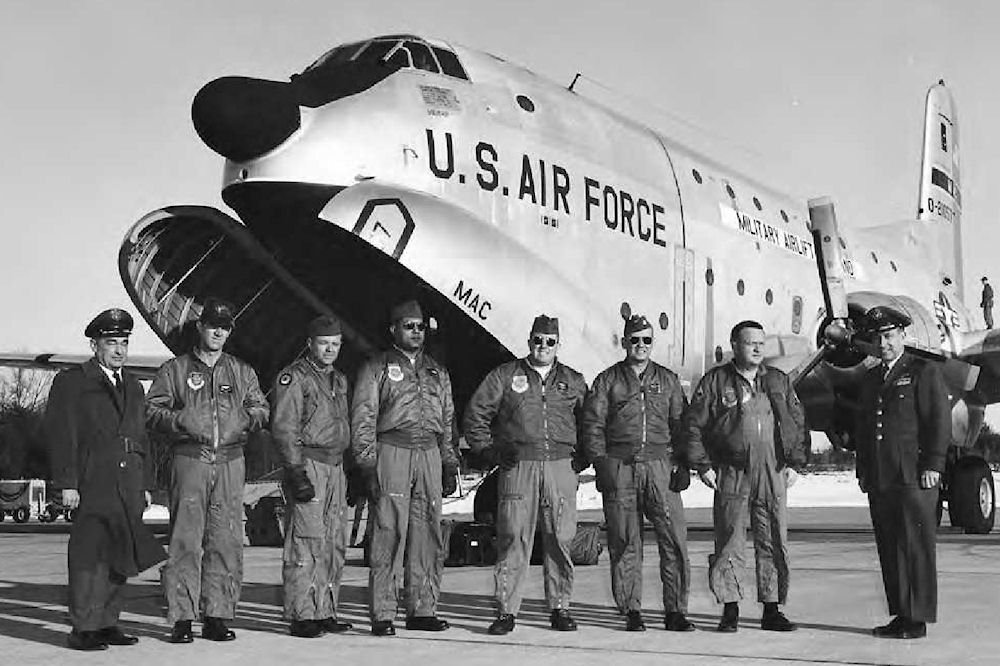
First 133d MAS C-124C Globemaster II, 9 February 1968

By March 1966, the 157th began regular logistical support for the burgeoning American forces in South Vietnam. During the next five years, 157th aircrews averaged two flights a month to Tan Son Nhut Air Base, Cam Ranh Air Base, and Da Nang Air Base in South Vietnam, as well as to other USAF-controlled bases in Southeast Asia, transporting air freight and military personnel on globe-circling trips which took Guardsmen away from their homes and jobs for 10- to 20-day periods. Each mission from New Hampshire to South Vietnam could become an air marathon of sorts. During one flight, the trip lasted almost 11 days, as the 133d flew from Pease AFB to Dover Air Force Base, Delaware, where cargo was loaded. Next it was on to the West Coast, then Hawaii, Wake Island, Guam, the Philippines, and finally, South Vietnam. To help exhausted combat troops get their R&R, the Air National Guard, including the 157th, flew more than 110,000 military personnel throughout the U.S. and overseas. In the 1,352 "Combat Leave" missions logged, approximately 38,300 military personnel were transported from Southeast Asia to the states and back again.

In December 1967, the 157th again changed aircraft, exchanging its C-97 Stratofreighters for the larger and slower C-124C Globemaster II. The C-124 had been the cargo workhorse of the Air Force since the Korean War. The first of the C-124s arrived on 9 February 1968. By late fall, the ninth and last Globemaster touched down and crew transitioning was well underway. By September 1969 the Group had retrained its pilots to the new aircraft and completed its first Operational Readiness Inspection as a C-124 unit, qualifying to resume global airlift support.

The 157th hauled much large "out-size" cargo such as trucks, military vehicles, and missile components. It also carried troops and cargo that didn't require the speedy capability of MAC's all-jet C-141 Starlifter and C-5A Galaxy airlift fleet. Although two- and three-day flights within the U.S. were common, the 157th's overseas commitment was growing. In 1969 the unit transported more than 1,000 tons of cargo and 2,000 passengers, its aircrews logging 5,236 hours on 44 overseas missions to Vietnam, England, France, West Germany, Greece, Japan, Portugal, Newfoundland, Puerto Rico, and Taiwan.

==== Tactical airlift mission ====
On 6 April 1971, the Secretary of the Air Force announced the redesignation of the unit to the 157th Tactical Airlift Group. After 10 years in the airlift business, the unit assumed a new role with its seventh type aircraft—the C-130A Hercules. The 157th was also transferred to Tactical Air Command (TAC), with a mission to provide mobility and logistical support for ground forces in all types of operations. It was all part of a nationwide program involving one-third of the Air National Guard's flying units and inspired by Secretary of Defense Melvin Laird. The C-130A was the backbone of TAC's theater airlift fleet, a medium assault transport with long range (beyond 2,000 miles), high speed (220 to 300 miles per hour), and capable of landing or taking off from a shorter runway than any comparable aircraft. The turbo-prop aircraft with its five-man crew could carry nearly 20 tons of cargo or 92 fully equipped troops, 64 paratroops or 74 litter patients and attendants.

On 8 July 1971 the first C-130A arrived from the 317th Tactical Airlift Wing, Lockbourne Air Force Base, Ohio. About a month later, on 9 August, the first C-130 flight with all-157th crew took place. By September heavy Phase I transition training was underway with both aircrew and support personnel at schools throughout the United States. By early 1972, the 133d Tactical Airlift Squadron began Phase II (combat readiness) training, and in April, low-level flying and navigational training missions were being flown day and night along air routes crossing Maine, New Hampshire, and Massachusetts. First drops of paratroopers and cargo began in early May, and in mid-month, the 157th passed a "no notice" Twelfth Air Force Management Effectiveness Inspection (MEI).

During the summer of 1973, the 157th participated in a joint Army, Air Force, and National Guard-Reserve training exercise. The U.S. Readiness Command training, code named Boldfire 1-74, was centered at Camp Joseph T. Robinson, Arkansas. During Boldfire, ground personnel were airlifted aboard the unit's C-130 aircraft to Fort Campbell, Kentucky. They remained there throughout the exercise, maintaining aircraft. 157th C-130s, in turn, dropped paratroops and equipment in support of ground forces. During this time frame, the unit also had a crew participating in Coronet Shamrock, an Air Force-wide air-drop competition. The 157th crew won the preliminary competition at Fort Campbell, earning the right to represent the ANG in further competition.

The operational honors were dampened somewhat on 12 October when the 133d Aeromedical Evacuation Flight was inactivated. The 133rd AME Flight had been organized and federally recognized on 10 June 1961. The unit's 18 officers and 27 enlisted medical personnel would fill vacancies and augment medical services in the 157th TAC Clinic.

The 1973 oil crisis caught up with the 157th at the end of 1973, and all flying activity was suspended from 22 December until 7 January 1974, due to fuel shortages throughout the country. In December 1974, the Group was transferred back to Military Airlift Command (MAC) when TAC's theater transport mission were transferred to MAC.

=== Air refueling ===
==== Strategic Air Command ====
On 1 October 1975 the 157th was relieved from Military Airlift Command and transferred to Strategic Air Command (SAC), becoming a KC-135A Stratotanker unit. By the end of March 1976, the New Hampshire ANG unit had largely taken over the support of the 509th Bombardment Wing from its active-duty 34th Air Refueling Squadron which was inactivated on 31 March 1976.

By October 1976, the 157th Air Refueling Group and the 509th Bombardment Wing shared the same mission and response times, giving them a link to the "Total Force Concept". The 133d deployed to RAF Mildenhall, England, as part of the European Tanker Task Force. Once in the UK, the unit engaged in friendly competition with active duty flyers in "Giant Voice". The 133d was also the first ANG unit to air refuel the then-experimental B-1A bomber. A January 1977 inspection rated the 157th SAC's first Air National Guard unit to be "fully operationally ready." It became the second ANG unit in SAC history to stand alert with the active force.

By the end of 1978, the 157th Air Refueling Group was fully established as one of the "Best" in SAC. During the latter months of 1979, aircraft from the 157th joined forces with 16 KC-135A's providing air refueling support for "Crested Cap". This airpower exercise tested the deployment capability of Air Force fighter aircraft moving from the U.S. to Europe in support of NATO war efforts there. The 157th AREFG finished 1979 by winning the "Navigation" Trophy at Giant Voice '79, a four-month competition among SAC, TAC, ADTAC, ANG, AFRES, and RAF-manned bomber and air refueling tankers. The 157th was the first Air National Guard or Air Force Reserve unit to win a trophy in the 31-year history of the SAC competition.

During the 1980s, the 157th continued to participate in Strategic Air Command exercises like Global Shield and Giant Voice. In 1984, the 133d converted from its aging KC-135A fleet with new fuel efficient KC-135Es and the receipt of its first Air Force Outstanding Unit Award. The wing engaged in routine worldwide deployments with its KC-135s, refueling a 12-aircraft tanker task force that refueled F-105s returning from a deployment in Denmark in August 1981's Operation "Coronet Rudder". Less than a year later, in February 1982, 160 personnel were deployed to Andersen AFB, Guam, as part of "Pacific Sentry". This was the first time 133d KC-135 tankers had flown 10,000 miles in support of a mission, a unit distance record. During its 15 days on Guam, the unit conducted missions to Kadena AB, Okinawa, Diego Garcia, Clark AB, Philippines, Japan, and Australia. Additionally, the 157th CES rebuilt the base fire station on Andersen AFB.

The first 157th female pilot, 1st Lt. Ellen G. Hard, began flying the KC-135E in August 1984. A resident of Arlington, Massachusetts, Hard was recommended by the NHANG for pilot school at Laughlin AFB, Texas. She had served four years of active duty as a personnel officer at Lackland AFB, Texas, and Hanscom AFB, Massachusetts. Lt. Hard trained on both the KC-135A and KC-135E models.

==== Pease AFB closure ====
In 1989, the first Base Realignment and Closure Commission (BRAC) recommended the closure of Pease Air Force Base. As part of the closure process, a Pease Redevelopment Commission (PRC) was established to plan the closure and redevelopment of the base. On 1 August 1999, it was resolved that the 157th Air Refueling Group, New Hampshire ANG, would remain at Pease, and the facility would be redeveloped as a civilian airport, among other planned uses by the community.

It took only two years for the active component to complete departure activities, including transferring personnel and assets to other military installations. The 509th's fleet of FB-111A bombers departed in phases from June to September 1990. The 13 KC-135A tankers assigned to the 509th transferred to Wurtsmith AFB, Michigan; Plattsburgh AFB, New York; Eaker AFB, Arkansas; Carswell AFB, Texas, and Fairchild AFB, Washington. in October 1990, the personnel of the 509th were reassigned throughout the Air Force.

Pease Airport opened for civilian use through an Airfield Joint Use Agreement with the USAF on 19 July 1991. Base Closure Law directed that the 157th ARG be consolidated into a cantonment area. 220 acres (89 ha) were identified and retained by the USAF for the Group's continued mission. Having shared resources with an active-duty air base since 1966, the 157th would learn to adapt to providing all necessary functions for itself.

Base closure-related projects would eventually include an alert facility, dining hall, base security systems, fuels facilities, communications facility, magazine, and a vehicle maintenance facility. Utility deficiencies were so severe that the program also included the complete replacement of the power and communications distribution system, and also eventually the construction of a heat plant.

On 1 April 1991, Strategic Air Command turned control of Pease Air Force Base over to the Department of Defense, and the active military base was closed. The remaining Air National Guard portion of the now civilian facility was renamed Pease Air National Guard Base.

==== 1990–1991 Gulf Crisis ====
Early on the morning of 7 August 1990, Operation Desert Shield, a build-up of friendly forces designed to contain the spread of Iraqi aggression, began. A telephone alert asked every crew member of the 133d Air Refueling Squadron to provide maximum availability so that an immediate response capability could be developed. All 125 Operations crew members stepped forward in voluntary support.

The unit began functioning on a 24-hour, seven-days-a-week basis. Forty-two Desert Shield missions would be flown in the month of August as the 133d helped refuel transport aircraft and fighters heading to United States Air Forces Central (CENTAF) bases in the Middle East. Forty volunteers were placed on full active duty status for as long as needed. Close to 100 guard members reported during the next few days as seven additional airplanes arrived TDY from Ohio, Pennsylvania, and New Jersey ANG units, together with the 157th's own KC-135E aircraft forming an Air National Guard tanker task force. By 1 October, the 157th's heavy support of MAC flights in transit from the West Coast to bases in Saudi Arabia began to slow. The 157th became one of 12 National Guard units tasked with providing refueling support to Air Force units deployed to Saudi Arabia.

On 12 October the 157th began deployment of its assets to Saudi Arabia to form the 1709th Air Refueling Wing (Provisional) at King Abdul Aziz Air Base, Jeddah. Personnel and aircraft, however, were dispersed at several locations in the Middle East, including Al Banteen Air Base, Abu Dhabi, United Arab Emirates; Morón Air Base, Spain; Cairo West Airport, Egypt; and other locations. By January 1991, the build-up of men and material in-theater was complete. Operation Desert Storm, the attack phase of the Allied plan to liberate Kuwait and destroy Iraq's army, was ready to begin. With its strategic location on the Atlantic shore, the 157th mission reverted to an "Air-Bridge" mode, refueling transiting aircraft heading across the Atlantic or inbound from RAF Mildenhall, England, which served on the other end of the transatlantic route to the Middle East.

After a short 100 hours of ground combat, Iraq's elite Republican Guard quickly collapsed, and Kuwait was easily recaptured by Coalition ground forces. Emotional returns punctuated by parades, bands, speeches, tears, and bear-hugs were commonplace in New Hampshire as they were throughout the country. Many deployed units returning from CENTAF bases stopped at Pease AGB on their way to their home bases. The 157th, its aircraft festooned with yellow ribbons painted above the boom, remained in "air-bridge" mode, supporting the returning traffic. By late April almost everyone had come home safely. There had been no casualties.

==== Air Mobility Command ====
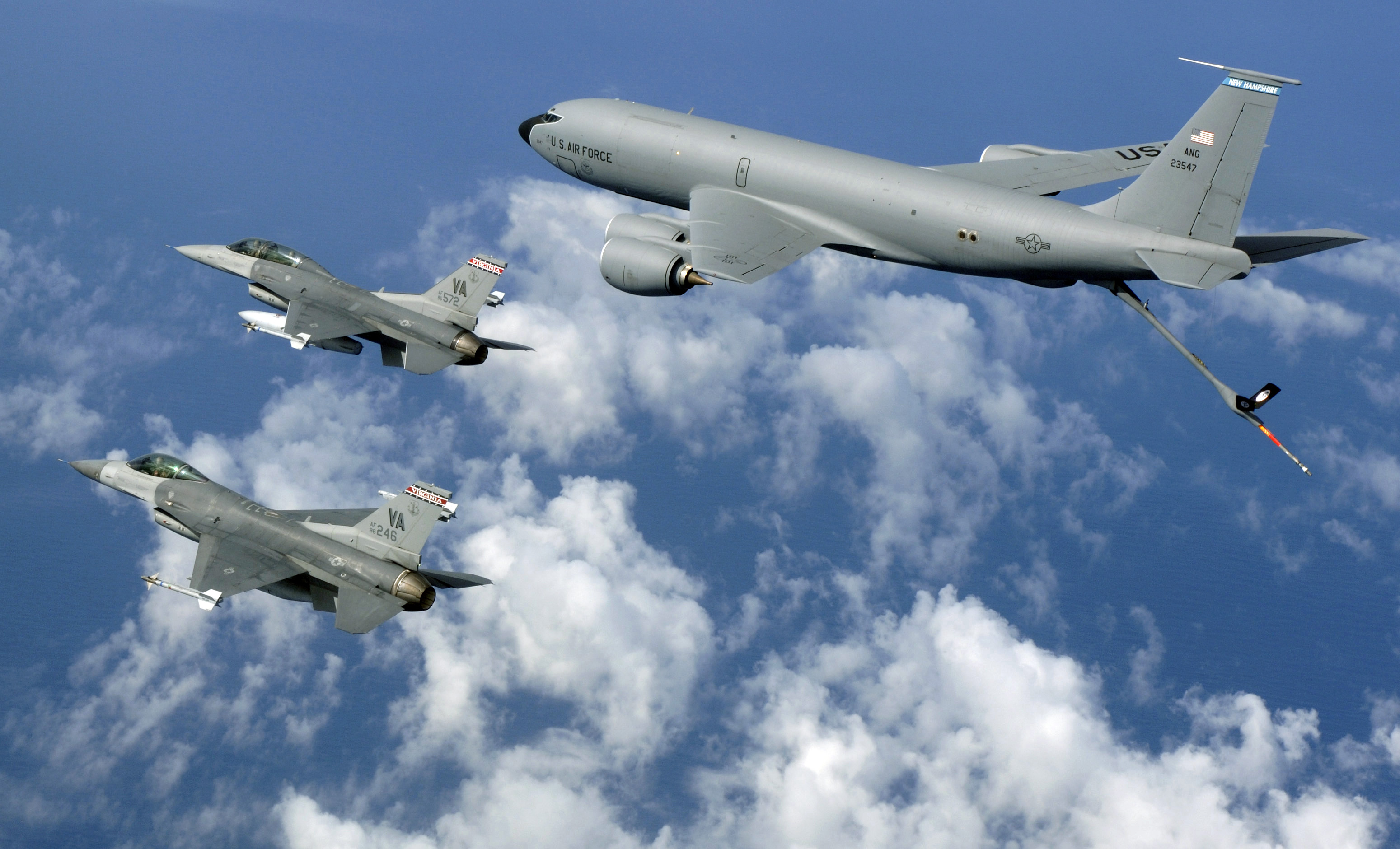
157th ARW KC-135 Stratotankers refueling Virginia ANG F-16 Fighting Falcons, 2005

In July 1991, 100 Russian children from the nuclear-contaminated Chernobyl area flew into Pease to begin attending summer camps. The Samantha Smith Foundation flight saw a Soviet Ilyushin Il-62, technically a military aircraft, land for the first time at a SAC base. Parked just a few hundred feet away, in an ironic twist, was Air Force One. Later that year, President George H. W. Bush ordered the end of Alert Missions on 1 October, ending a 15-year base ritual.

In May 1992, with the end of the Cold War, the 157th adopted the Air Force Objective Organization plan, and the unit was redesignated as the 157th Air Refueling Wing. The 133d was assigned to the new 157th Operations Group. A month later, on 1 June, Strategic Air Command was inactivated as part of the Air Force reorganization after the end of the Cold War. It was replaced by Air Combat Command (ACC). In 1993, ACC transferred its KC-135 tanker force to the new Air Mobility Command (AMC).

By mid-1993, the 157th was reorganizing, bringing the 157th in line with current Air Force restructuring guidelines. The 133d's 10 KC-135E-model aircraft were replaced throughout the summer with quieter, more efficient R-models. With their new CFM-56 engines, a 50 percent decrease in noise resulted, and emissions were reduced 90 percent, while range, fuel off-load capability, and reliability were all increased. By January 1994 all the unit's KC-135's had been converted to R-Models.

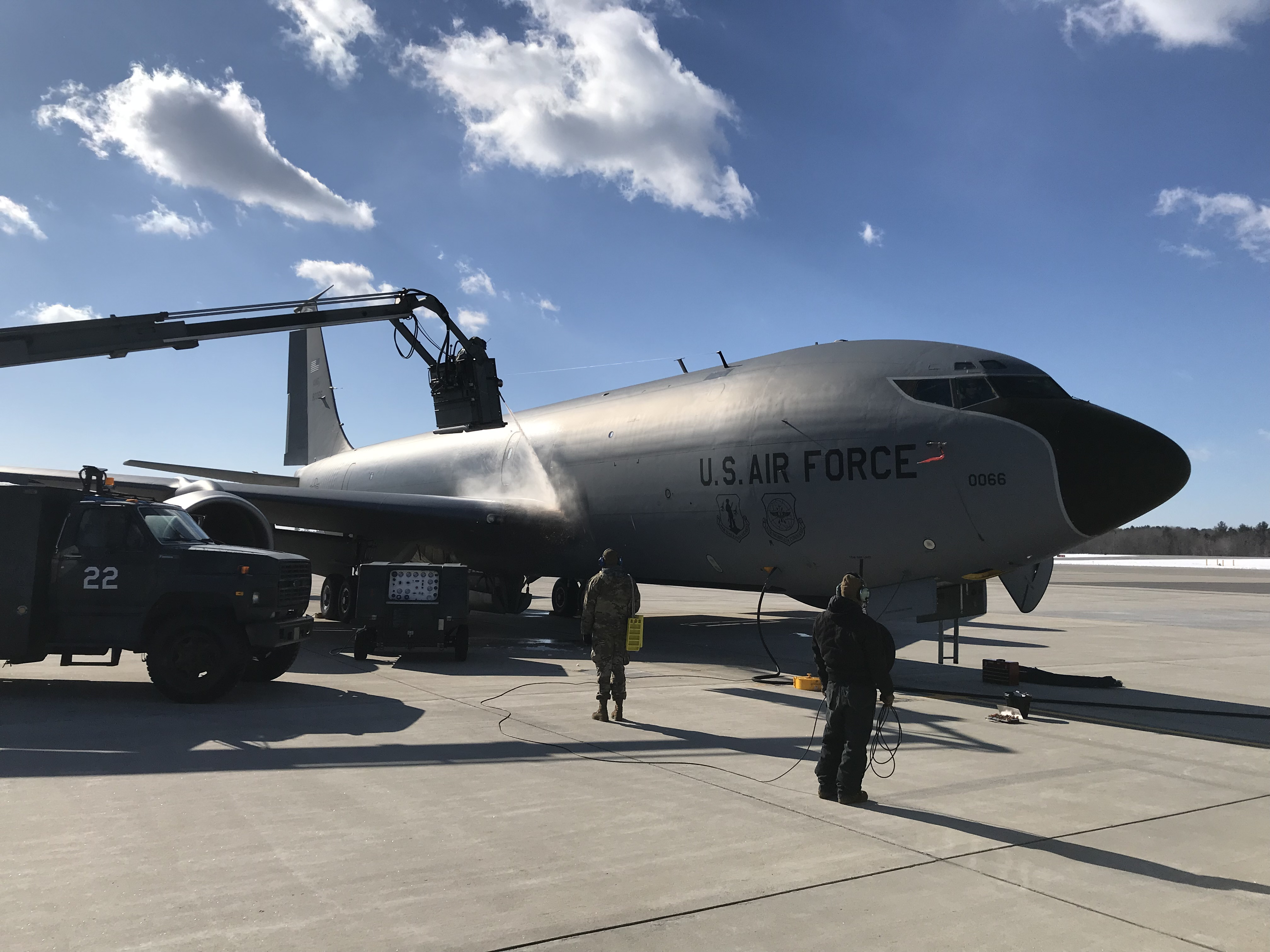
A KC-135 at Pease in March 2019

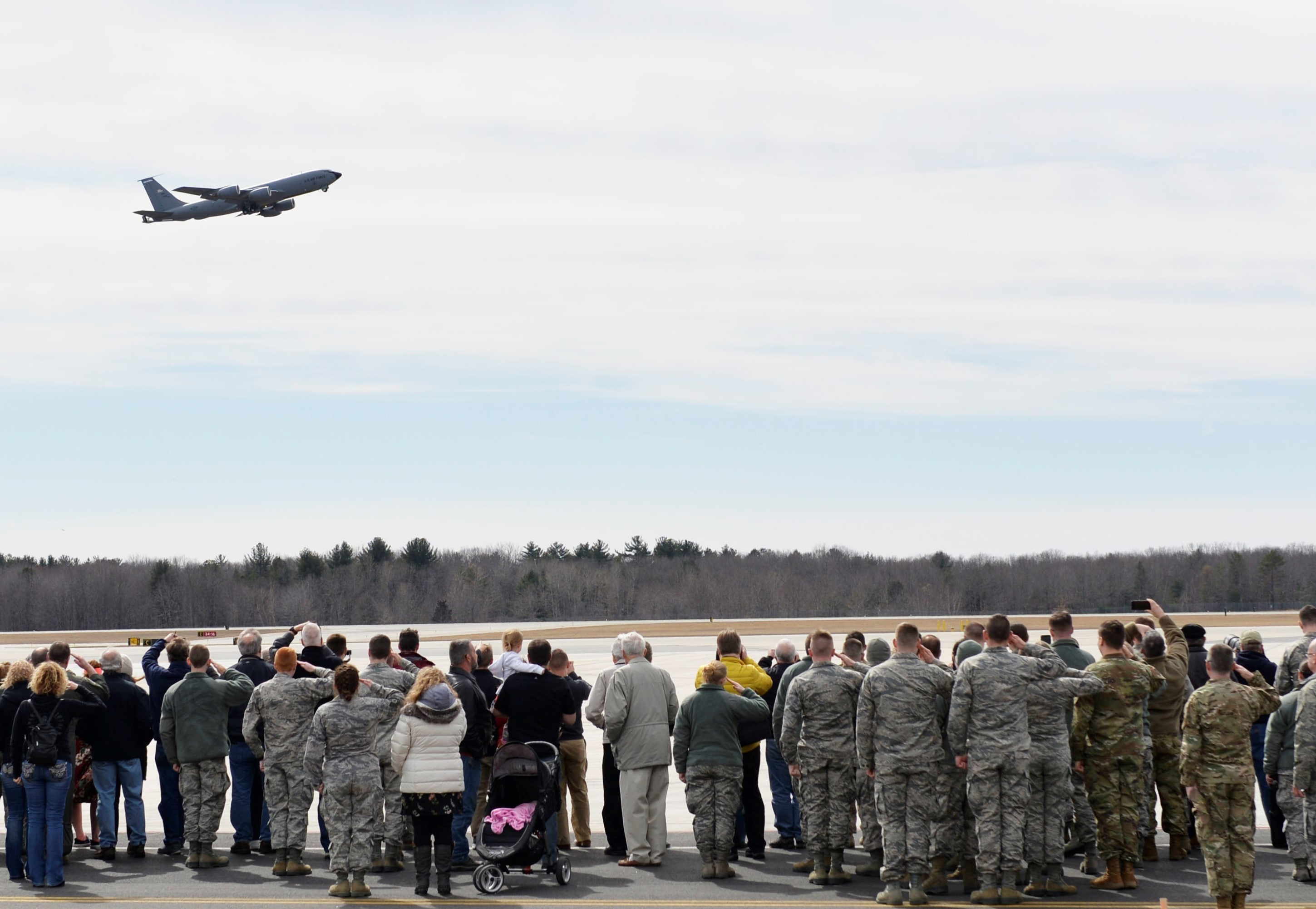
The last KC-135 at Pease departing on 24 March 2019

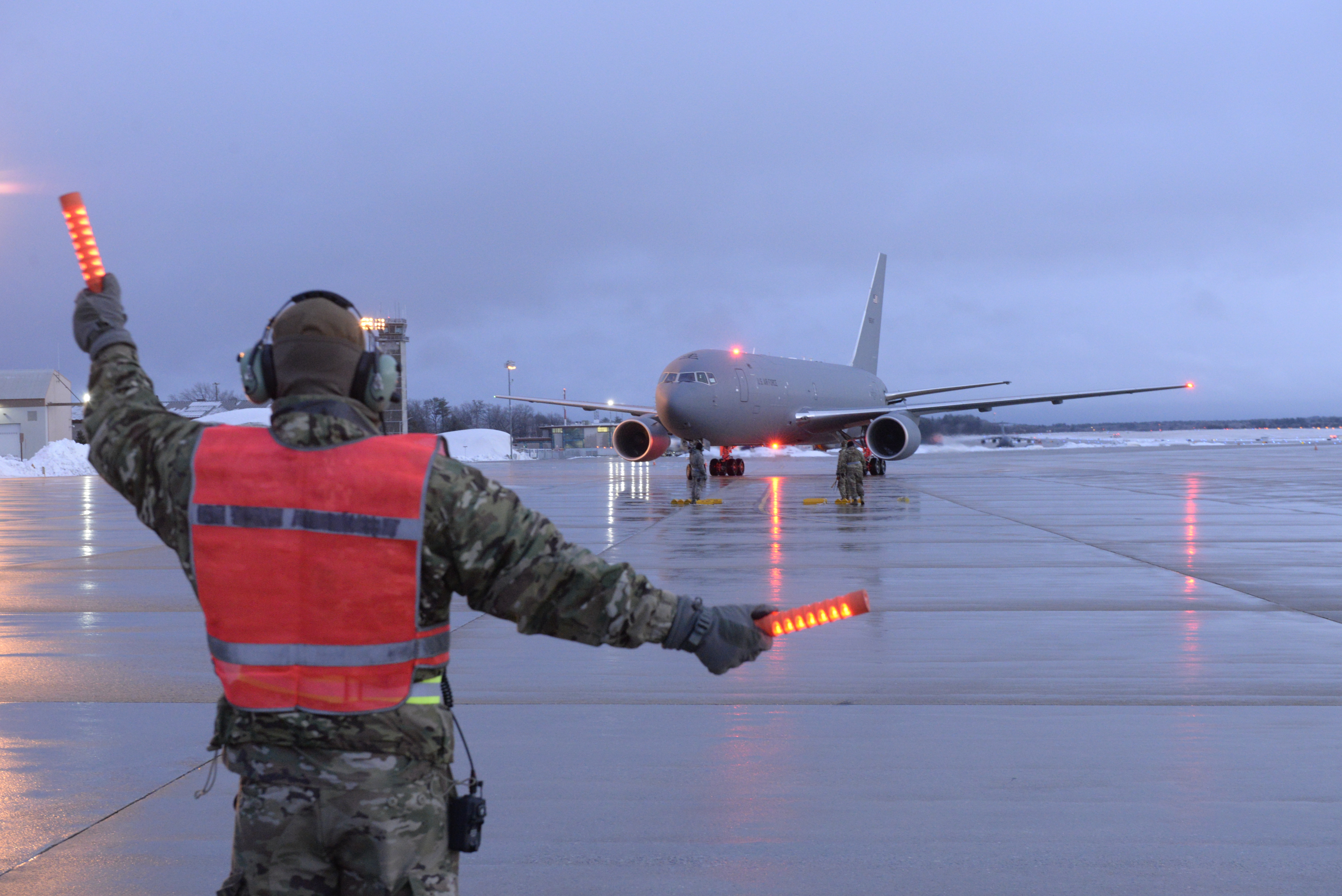
A KC-46A arriving a Pease in February 2020

The unit engaged in routine deployments and training until 1994, when the 157th began operating the Northeast Tanker Task Force together with the Maine Air National Guard. The situation in Bosnia-Herzegovina and "Operation Deny Flight" continued to involve 157th aircraft, crews, and support personnel. In December, 52 unit members deployed with the Niagara Falls 107th Air Refueling Wing to Pisa Airport, Italy. At Pease, "Operation Phoenix Moat" missions required 157th participation to help with the flow of personnel and materiel to the area. The mission in Bosnia was renamed "Joint Endeavor" and, finally, "Decisive Endeavor", as the crisis cooled. Consolidating assets, the Air Guard left Istres AB, France, and operated exclusively out of Pisa, rotating units through on a month-to-month basis. The 157th's turn came again in October 1996, as 207 unit members swapped in and out of the Italian air base for the month.

By 1997, the 157th had already been rotating 145 members through Incirlik Air Base, Turkey, as part of "Operation Northern Watch", enforcing the no-fly zone over northern Iraq. Three months later, in February 1998, the 157th, augmented by four transient aircraft, flew 28 sorties offloading gas to an air convoy carrying Army personnel and equipment from Georgia to the theater area. In the face of mounting U.S. military might, Saddam Hussein backed down.

The year 2000 saw the 157th provide support to Operation Joint Forge as well as other operational and training missions. During Operation Joint Forge, the 157th flew 55 sorties, off-loading over one and one half million pounds of fuel to operational fighters and surveillance aircraft off the coast of the former republic of Yugoslavia.

The 157th also provided support to the Clean Hunter 2000 NATO exercise, with a deployment to Karup Air Base, Denmark. The 157th also deployed to fill Expeditionary Combat Support shortfalls for Operation Southern Watch and Operation Northern Watch, NORAD alert in Iceland and Alaska, support of NATO AWCS in Germany and individual rotations to Joint Forge in Istres, France. One such deployment involved 50 personnel in Southwest Asia during the summer, as part of an Air Expeditionary Forces deployment.

In its 2005 BRAC Recommendations, DoD recommended to realign March Air Reserve Base, California. The 163d Air Refueling Wing (ANG) would distribute its nine KC-135R aircraft to the 157th Air Refueling Wing (ANG), Pease Air National Guard Station (three aircraft), and several other bases. Military judgment also placed additional force structure at Pease to support the Northeast Tanker Task Force and also robust the squadron to a more effective size of 12 aircraft.

Following the September 11 attacks in 2001, the 157th Air Refueling Wing operated 24 hours a day, seven days a week in support of the war on terror. In 2009, the Wing was selected as an Active Associate Wing, bringing approximately 150 active duty members to its base.

In August 2014, Air Force leaders announced that the 157th would become the first Air National Guard unit to equip with the Boeing KC-46 Pegasus tanker. The Pegasus was scheduled to enter the Air Force inventory during fiscal year 2019. On 31 January 2019, two KC-135Rs (58-0023 and 58-0104) permanently departed Pease in preparation for arrival of the KC-46A later in the year. The final KC-135 at Pease, 57-1419, departed on 24 March 2019, for Goldwater Air National Guard Base in Phoenix, Arizona. The first KC-46A arrived at Pease on 8 August 2019. The 12th and final KC-46A was delivered on 5 February 2021.

== Lineage ==
- Constituted as the 311th Bombardment Group (Light) on 28 January 1942

Activated on 2 March 1942
Redesignated 311th Bombardment Group (Dive) on 27 July 1942
Redesignated 311th Fighter-Bomber Group, Single Engine on 20 September 1943
Redesignated 311th Fighter Group, Single Engine on 30 May 1944
Inactivated on 6 January 1946

- Redesignated 101st Fighter Group, Single Engine and allotted to the National Guard on 24 May 1946.

Activated on 3 February 1947
Received federal on 4 April 1947
Federalized and ordered to active service on 10 February 1951
Inactivated on 6 February 1952

- Released from active duty and returned to Maine state control on 1 November 1952

Activated and received federal recognition on 1 November 1952

- Withdrawn from the Maine Air National Guard and inactivated 30 April 1954
- Allotted to the Vermont Air National Guard, activated and extended federal recognition on 1 June 1954
- Withdrawn from the Vermont Air National Guard and inactivated 31 March 1956
- Redesignated 101st Fighter Group (Air Defense) on 15 April 1956, allotted to the New Hampshire Air National Guard, activated and extended federal recognition on 15 April 1956
- Redesignated 157th Air Transport Group, Heavy on 1 September 1960

Redesignated 157th Military Airlift Group on 1 January 1966
Redesignated 157th Tactical Airlift Group on 11 September 1971
Redesignated 157th Air Refueling Group, Heavy on 1 October 1975
Redesignated 157th Air Refueling Group on 16 March 1972
Redesignated: 157th Air Refueling Wing on 16 October 1995

=== Assignments ===
- III Air Support Command, 2 March 1942 – 18 July 1943
- Tenth Air Force, 14 September 1943 – 28 August 1944
- 312th Fighter Wing, 18 August 1944 – 14 December 1945
- Army Service Forces, Port of Embarkation, 5 – 6 January 1946
- 67th Fighter Wing, 4 April 1947
- 101st Fighter Wing (later 101st Fighter-Interceptor Wing), 1 November 1950 – 6 February 1952
- 101st Fighter-Interceptor Wing, 1 November 1952 – 30 April 1954
- 101st Fighter-Interceptor Wing, 1 June 1954 – 31 March 1956
- 101st Air Defense Wing, 15 April 1956
- 133d Air Transport Wing, 1 September 1960
- New Hampshire Air National Guard, 8 January 1966

Gaining commands
Air Defense Command, 1 November 1952
Military Air Transport Service, 1 September 1960
Military Airlift Command, 1 January 1966
Tactical Air Command, 11 September 1971
Military Airlift Command, 1 December 1974
Strategic Air Command, 1 October 1975
Air Combat Command, 1 June 1992
Air Mobility Command, 1 June 1993 – present

=== Components ===
Groups

- 157th Operations Group, 31 May 1992 – present

Squadrons

- 132d Squadron (see 382d Bombardment Squadron)
- 133d Squadron (see 383d Bombardment Squadron)
- 134th Squadron (see 384th Bombardment Squadron)
- 382d Bombardment Squadron (later 528th Fighter-Bomber Squadron, 528th Fighter Squadron, 132d Fighter Squadron, 132d Fighter-Interceptor Squadron): 2 March 1942 – 6 January 1946, 4 April 1947 – 6 February 1952; 1 July 1954 – 1 September 1960
- 383d Bombardment Squadron (later 529th Fighter-Bomber Squadron 529th Fighter Squadron, 133d Fighter Squadron, 133d Fighter-Interceptor Squadron, 133d Air Transport Squadron, 133d Military Airlift Squadron, 133d Tactical Airlift Squadron, 133d Air Refueling Squadron)): 2 March 1942 – 6 January 1946, 4 April 1947 – 6 February 1952; 1 November 1952 – 30 June 1954; 1 July 1954 – 31 May 1992
- 384th Bombardment Squadron (later 530th Fighter-Bomber Squadron, 530th Fighter Squadron, 134th Fighter Squadron, 134th Fighter-Interceptor Squadron): 2 March 1942 – 6 January 1946, 4 April 1947 – 6 February 1952; 1 November 1952 – 30 June 1954; 1 July 1954 – 14 April 1956
- 385th Bombardment Squadron: 2 March 1942 – 30 September 1943
- 528th Fighter-Bomber Squadron (see 382d Bombardment Squadron)
- 529th Fighter-Bomber Squadron (see 383d Bombardment Squadron)
- 530th Fighter-Bomber Squadron (see 384th Bombardment Squadron)

=== Stations ===
- Will Rogers Field, Oklahoma, 2 March 1942
- Hunter Field, Georgia, 4 July 1942
- Waycross Army Air Field, Georgia, 22 October 1942 – 18 July 1943
- Nawadih Airfield, India, 14 September 1943
- Dinjan Airfield, India, 11 October 1943
- Tingkawk Sakan Airfield, Burma, 6 July 1944
- Pungchacheng Airfield, China, 28 August 1944 – 14 December 1945
- Fort Lawton, Washington, 5 – 6 January 1946
- Camp Keyes, Maine, 4 February 1947
- Dow Air Force Base, Maine, January 1951
- Grenier Air Force Base, New Hampshire, 23 April 1951
- Larson Air Force Base, Washington, 2 August 1951 – 6 February 1952
- Dow Air Force Base, Maine, 1 November 1952 – 30 April 1954
- Ethan Allen Air Force Base, Vermont, 1 July 1954 – 31 March 1956
- Grenier Air Force Base (later Grenier Field), New Hampshire, 15 April 1956
- Pease Air Force Base (later Pease Air National Guard Base), New Hampshire, 11 September 1971 – present

=== Aircraft ===
- V-72 Vengeance 1942
- A-36 Apache 1943–1944
- P-51 Mustang, 1944–1945
- F-47D Thunderbolt, 1947–1948
- F-51D Mustang, 1949
- F-80C Shooting Star, 1949–1952
- F-86F Sabre 1952–1955
- Lockheed F-94A/B Starfire, 1956–1958
- North American F-86L Sabre, 1958–1960
- Boeing C-97A Stratofreighter, 1960–1967
- Douglas C-124C Globemaster II, 1967–1971
- Lockheed C-130A Hercules, 1971–1975
- Boeing KC-135 Stratotanker, 1975–2019
  - KC-135A, 1975–1984
  - KC-135E, 1984–1993
  - KC-135R, 1993–24 March 2019
- Boeing KC-46A Pegasus, 8 August 2019–present
