= 133rd Air Refueling Squadron =

New Hampshire Air National Guard unit

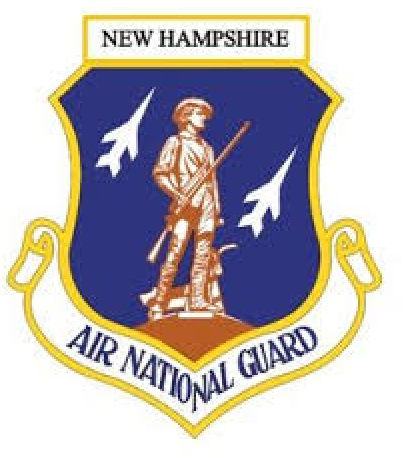
133rd Air Refueling Squadron

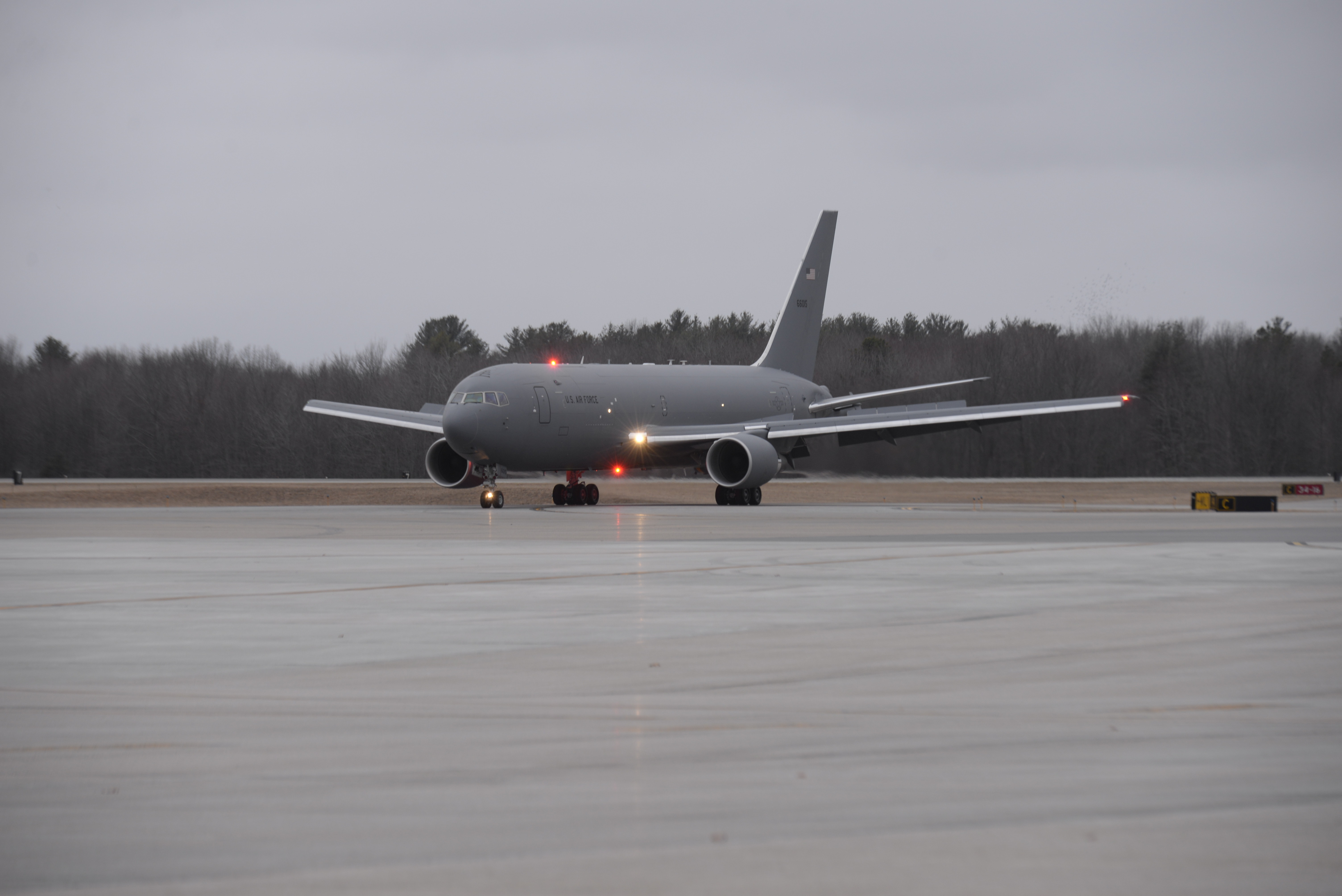
- 133rd Air Refueling Squadron KC-46A Pegasus taxiing at Pease ANGB, 2020
- Active: 1942–1946; 1947–1952; 1952–1971; 1971–present
- Country: United States
- Allegiance: New Hampshire
- Branch: Air National Guard
- Type: Squadron
- Role: Aerial refueling
- Part of: New Hampshire Air National Guard
- Garrison/HQ: Pease Air National Guard Base, New Hampshire
- Motto: Live Free Or Die
- Engagements: China-Burma-India Theater
- Decorations: Air Force Outstanding Unit Award

Insignia
- 133rd Air Refueling Squadron emblem (Note: Approved for the 383rd Bombardment Squadron, but date unknown. Hubbard, p. 717.)

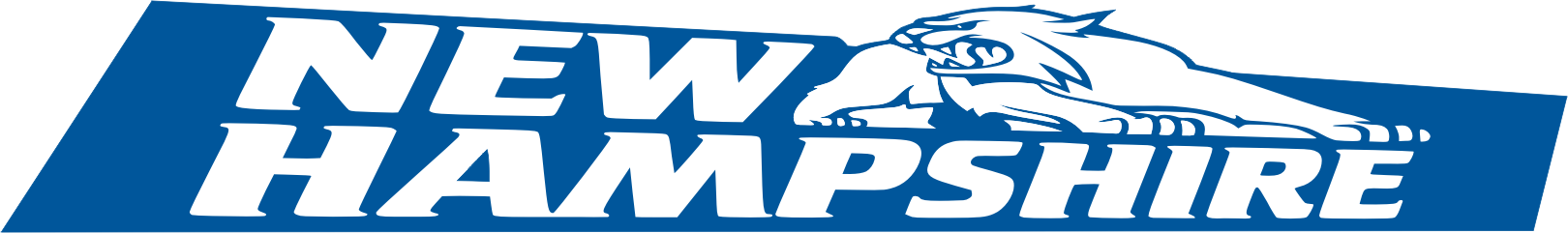
- Tail stripe

Aircraft flown
- Tanker: Boeing KC-46A Pegasus

The 133rd Air Refueling Squadron is a unit of the New Hampshire Air National Guard 157th Air Refueling Wing located at Pease Air National Guard Base, Portsmouth, New Hampshire. The 133rd, which previously operated the KC-135 Stratotanker, received its first Boeing KC-46A Pegasus tanker on 8 August 2019.

The squadron was first activated in March 1942 as the 383rd Bombardment Squadron. After training as a dive bomber unit in the United States, it deployed to the China-Burma-India Theater in the summer of 1943. It was redesignated the 529th Fighter Squadron and engaged in combat through V-J Day, remaining in the theater until December 1945, when it returned to the United States for inactivation.

The squadron was allotted to the National Guard in 1946 and organized as the 133rd Fighter Squadron the following April. In February 1951, it was called to active duty for the Korean War. As the 133rd Fighter-Interceptor Squadron it served in the air defense of the northeastern United States until returning to state control in December 1952. The squadron continued in the air defense mission until 1960, when it assumed an airlift mission as the 133rd Air Transport Squadron. In 1975, it became the 133rd Air Refueling Squadron, and has continued in the air refueling role since then.

== History ==
=== World War II ===
==== Training in the United States ====
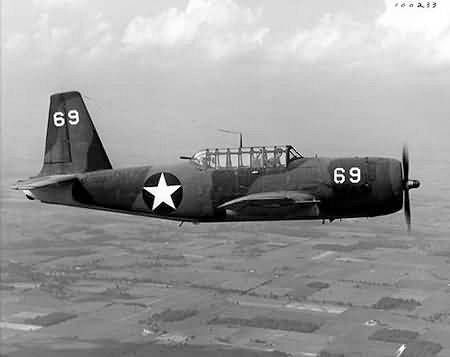
Vultee Vengeance of a training unit in the United States. (Note: Note the American national insigne, but Royal Air Force camouflage.)

The squadron was first activated at Will Rogers Field, Oklahoma in March 1942 as the 383rd Bombardment Squadron, one of the four original squadrons of the 311th Bombardment Group. The squadron moved to Georgia in July, where it trained at Hunter Field and Waycross Army Air Field for the following year. It primarily trained with Vultee V-72 Vengeance dive bombers, which had been ordered for the Royal Air Force, but which were impressed by the Army Air Forces after the United States entered World War II. Toward the end of its training, it also flew some North American A-36A Apaches. In July 1943, the squadron left the United States for the China-Burma-India Theater via Australia.

==== Combat in the China-Burma-India Theater ====
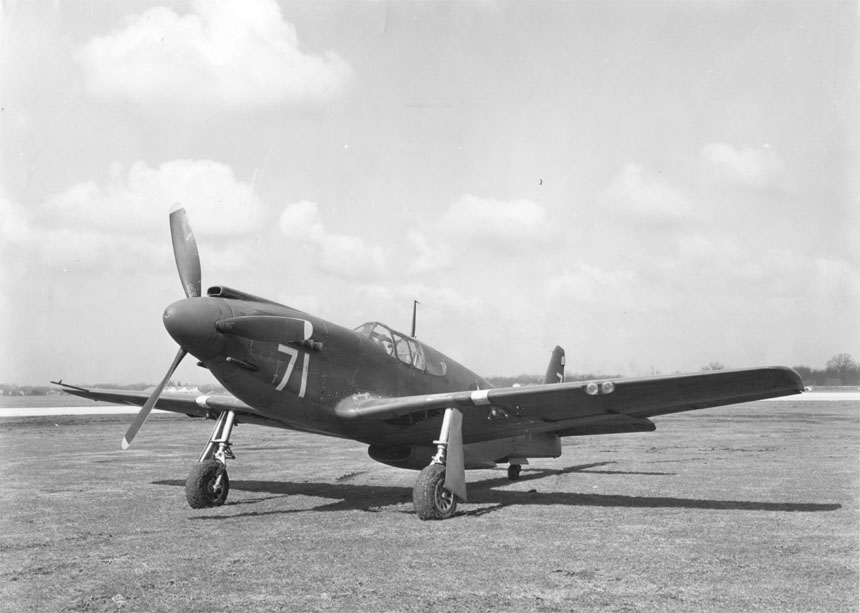
A-36 Apache as flown by the squadron

The squadron arrived at Nawadih Airfield, India in mid-September 1943 and began to equip with A-36 Apaches, converting to the fighter version, the North American P-51 Mustang by 1944. Shortly after its arrival, the AAF redesignated its single engine bomber units and the squadron became the 529th Fighter-Bomber Squadron. The squadron flew its first combat mission on 16 October. The group provided air support to Allied ground forces in Northern Burma. It provided escorts for Consolidated B-24 Liberator and North American B-25 Mitchell bombers attacking Rangoon, Insein and other targets in Burma. It bombed Japanese airfields in Myitkyina and Bhamo. It conducted patrol and reconnaissance missions to protect transport planes flying cargo over The Hump between India and China. The squadron continued to support ground forces, including Merrill's Marauders. It also flew fighter sweeps over enemy airfields in central and southern Burma.

In late August 1944 the 311th Group was assigned to Fourteenth Air Force and the squadron moved to Kwanghan Airfield, China. The squadron escorted bombers, flew interception missions against attacking Japanese aircraft, struck the enemy's lines of communications, and supported ground operations. It provided fighter cover for Boeing B-29 Superfortresses returning from raids on Japan from advanced bases in China. The squadron continued combat operations until V-J day. It was credited with the destruction of eight enemy aircraft, including three by Flight Officer Hoyt M. Hensley. (Note: The official total is 7.99 because three squadron pilots shared a victory on 26 October 1944, with each receiving cradit for .33 of a victory.) The squadron remained in China, moving to Shanghai in October. It ferried P-51s from India to equip the Chinese Air Force in November. The squadron departed China in December 1945. Upon its arrival at Fort Lawton, Washington, the Port of Embarkation, in January 1946, it was inactivated.

=== New Hampshire Air National Guard ===
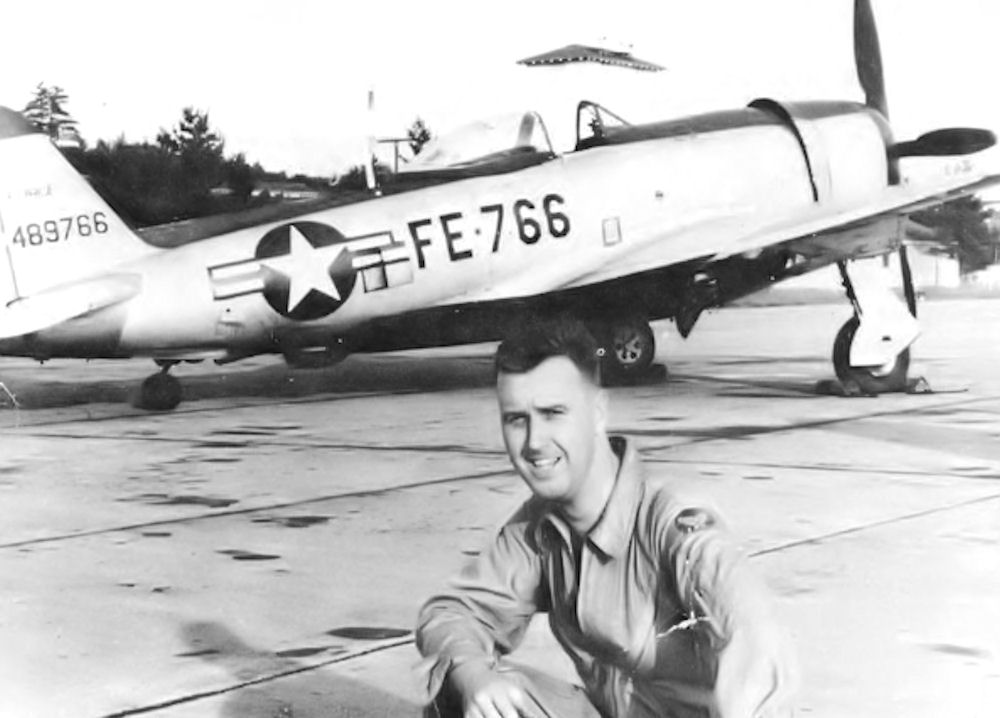
Squadron F-47D Thunderbolt (Note: Aircraft is Republic F-47D-30-RA Thunderbolt, serial 44-89766. It crashed on takeoff at Grenier AFB on 25 August 1952 while the squadron was on active duty. Dirkx, Marco (18 August 2025). "1944 USAF Serial Numbers". Joe Baugher’s Serial Number List. This was the first aircraft assigned to the New Hampshire National Guard.)

The squadron was redesignated the 133rd Fighter Squadron, and was allotted to the National Guard on 24 May 1946. It was organized at Grenier Field, New Hampshire, and was extended federal recognition on 4 April 1947. The 133rd was equipped with Republic F-47D Thunderbolts and was assigned to the 101st Fighter Group. Until 1 December 1948 the squadron's training was supervised by Air Defense Command (ADC), when it was transferred to Continental Air Command.

==== Air defense operations ====
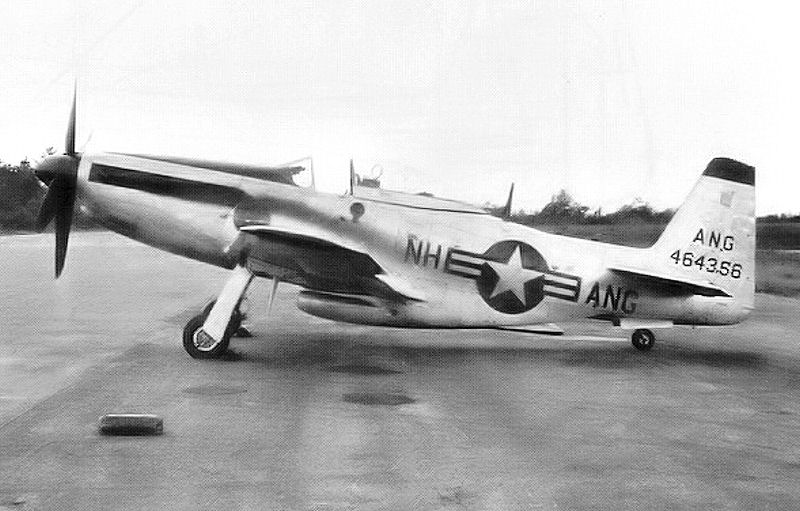
Squadron F-51H Mustang in 1953 (Note: Aircraft is North American F-51H-5-NA Mustang, serial 44-64356.)

The mission of the 133rd Squadron was the air defense of New Hampshire. The 133rd was federalized on 10 February 1951 and redesignated the 133rd Fighter-Interceptor Squadron and was attached to the 101st Fighter-Interceptor Wing. (Note: Cornett & Johnson state the squadron was assigned to the 101st Wing. Maurer states it was assigned to the 101st Group.) The squadron remained at Grenier, but was attached to the 33d Fighter-Interceptor Wing at Otis Air Force Base, Massachusetts, on 21 July 1951

ADC had difficulty under the existing wing base organizational structure in deploying its fighter squadrons to the best advantage. As it reorganized, The 33rd Wing was inactivated on 6 February 1952 and the squadron was transferred to the recently activated 4707th Defense Wing, a regional organization which replaced the 33rd Wing. On 1 November 1952, the 133rd was released from active duty and returned to the control of the State of New Hampshire. It transferred its mission, personnel, and aircraft to the active-duty 48th Fighter-Interceptor Squadron, which was activated on the same day.

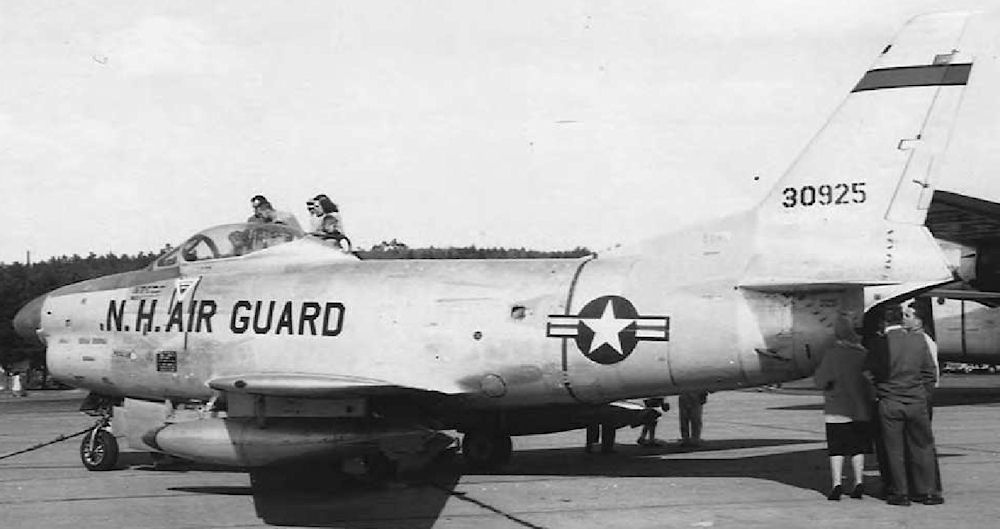
Squadron F-86L Sabre in 1959 (Note: Aircraft is North American F-86L Sabre, serial 53-925. This aircraft was built as an F-86D-60-NA, and modified to F-86L specification. It was transferred to the Military Aircraft Storage and Disposition Center (MASDC) on 9 May 1961 and reclaimed on 14 June 1961. Dirkx, Marco (7 June 2025). "1953 USAF Serial Numbers". Joe Baugher’s Serial Number List.)

On its return to state control, the squadron was assigned F-51H Mustangs. In June 1954, the squadron received Lockheed F-94 Starfiressand and began holding summer camp at Otis Air Force Base. The mission of the 133rd was to provide air defense for the United States and to intercept unidentified aircraft. From October 1954 until 30 June 1956 the 133rd maintained a dawn to dusk runway alert.

Since 1950, the Air National Guard had been organized into wings, self-sustaining organizations, made up of functional groups. Because it was not practical to put an entire wing on a single installation for day to day operations, squadrons like the 133rd were located on bases as “augmented squadrons” containing support elements needed to sustain operations. By the law at the time Guardsmen could only be activated as members of a mobilized unit. This meant that, even when only operational and maintenance elements were needed for mobilization, the entire “augmented squadron” had to be called to active duty, including unneeded administrative personnel. The response was to replace the “augmented squadron” with a group including functional squadrons that could be mobilized as a group, or individually. ADC began to implement this reorganization in 1956, and on 1 May 1956, the 101st Fighter-Interceptor Group was redesignated the 101st Fighter Group (Air Defense). The 133rd became the group's flying squadron. New organizations of the group were the 101st Material Squadron (maintenance and supply), 101st Air Base Squadron, and the 101st USAF Dispensary.

By April 1958, the 101st counted nearly 700 officers and airmen. It began to replace its Starfires with 24 North American F-86L Sabre, a dedicated swept-wing interceptor which was equipped with data link and armed with Folding-Fin Aerial Rockets. The Sabre had 650 miles per hour (1,050 km/h) speed, superb maneuverability, and a 1,000-mile (1,600 km) range.

==== Airlift operations ====
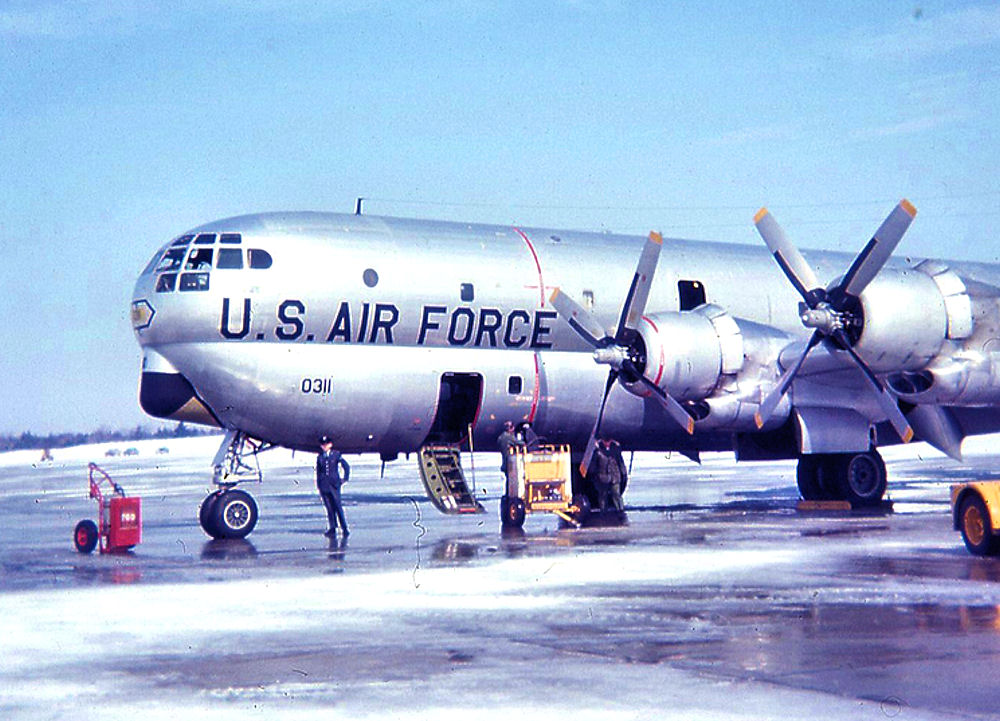
Squadron C-97G Stratofreighter about 1963 (Note: Aircraft is Boeing C-97G-145-BO Stratofreighter, serial 53-0311. It was transferred to MASDC on 25 April 1968 and declared excess on 19 May 1971. Dirkx, Marco (7 June 2025). "1953 USAF Serial Numbers". Joe Baugher’s Serial Number List.)

On 1 September 1960 the 133rd exchanged its Sabres for eight Boeing C-97 Stratofreighter aircraft, becoming the 133rd Air Transport Squadron. . Its parent 101st Fighter Group was redesignated the 157th Air Transport Group. With this change, Military Air Transport Command (MATS) became the squadron's wartime gaining command.

===== 1961 Berlin Crisis =====
On the night of 13 August 1961, the East German government erected barbed wire barriers around the 104-mile (167 km) periphery of West Berlin. In response, President John F. Kennedy federalized several Air National Guard units, including the 133rd. Although the squadron remained at Grenier during the crisis, its aircraft and crews ranged throughout the world The squadron also airlifted elements of the Turkish Army to South Korea and delivered essential communications equipment to South Vietnam. In 11 months, the crisis cooled and on 31 August 1962 the squadron's airmen were returned to State control.

In late 1965, 133rd personnel joined in Operation Christmas Star, airlifting some 23,000 pounds of gifts to United States forces in South Vietnam. Between 26 November and 1 December, with all-volunteer aircrews, three squadron C-97s delivered 23,000 pounds of cargo, collected in New Hampshire, to Saigon and Da Nang.

===== Move to Pease AFB =====
On 1 January 1966, MATS was replaced by Military Airlift Command (MAC), and the 133rd was redesignated the 133rd Military Airlift Squadron. The 133rd was gained by MAC upon mobilization. In addition, the closure of Grenier meant that the squadron moved to a new home at Pease Air Force Base, New Hampshire. The closure of Grenier was the result of Air Force-wide downsizing directed by Secretary of Defense Robert McNamara. At Pease, the squadron was assigned to buildings on the north side of the base, hosted by the active duty 509th Bombardment Wing. At the first drill in February 1966, the unit received a formal welcome by the 509th.

===== Vietnam War =====
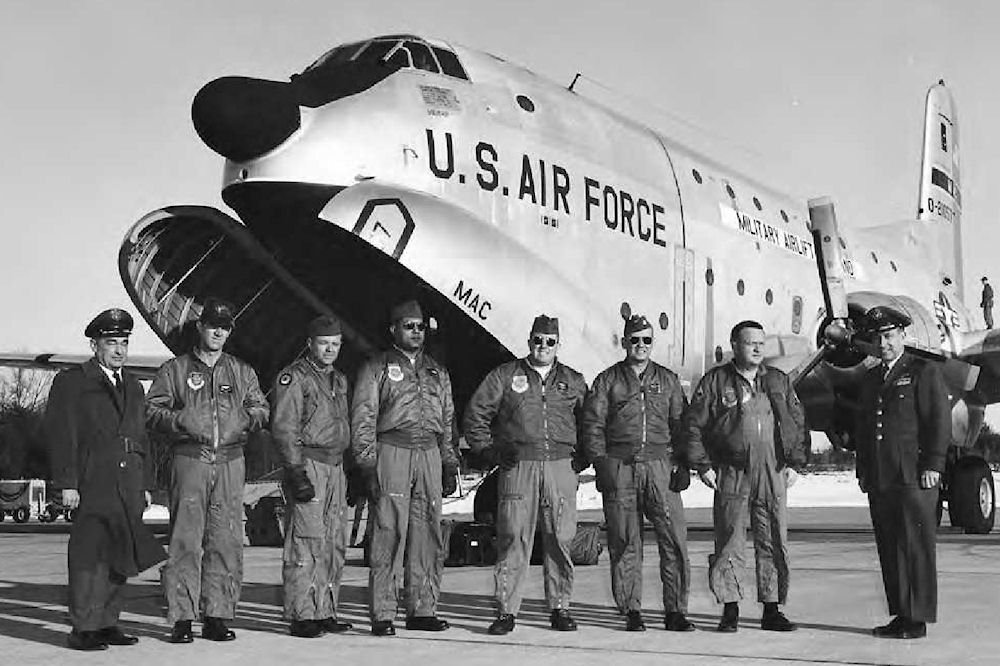
First Squadron C-124C Globemaster II on 9 February 1968

By March 1966, the 133rd began regular logistical support for American forces in South Vietnam. During the next five years, its aircrews averaged two flights a month to Tan Son Nhut Air Base, Cam Ranh Air Base, and Da Nang Air Base in South Vietnam as well as to other USAF-controlled bases in Southeast Asia, transporting air freight and military personnel on trips lasting 10 to 20 days. To help exhausted combat troops get their R&R, the Air National Guard, including the 133rd, flew more than 110,000 military personnel throughout the U.S. and overseas. In the 1,352 "Combat Leave" missions logged, approximately 38,300 military personnel were transported from Southeast Asia to the states and back again.

In December 1967, the 157th again changed aircraft, exchanging its C-97 Stratofreighters for the larger but slower C-124C Globemaster II. The C-124 had been the cargo workhorse of the Air Force since the Korean War. The first squadron C-124 arrived on 9 February 1968. By late fall, the ninth and last Globemaster touched down and crew transitioning was well underway. By September 1969 the group had retrained its pilots to the new aircraft and completed its first Operational Readiness Inspection as a C-124 unit, qualifying to resume global airlift support.

The 133rd hauled much large "out-size" cargo such as trucks, military vehicles, and missile components. It also carried troops and cargo that didn't require the speedy capability of MAC's all-jet Lockheed C-141 Starlifter and Lockheed C-5A Galaxy airlift fleet. Although two- and three-day flights within the U.S. were common, the squadron's overseas commitment was growing. In 1969 the unit transported more than 1,000 tons of cargo and 2,000 passengers, its aircrews logging 5,236 hours on 44 overseas missions to Vietnam, England, France, West Germany, Greece, Japan, Portugal, Newfoundland, Puerto Rico, and Taiwan.

==== Tactical airlift mission ====
On 6 April 1971, the Secretary of the Air Force announced the redesignation of the unit to the 133rd Tactical Airlift Squadron. After 10 years in the airlift business, the unit assumed a new role with its seventh type aircraft, the Lockheed C-130A Hercules. Tactical Air Command (TAC) became the squadron's mobilization gaining command, and its mission was to provide mobility and logistical support for ground forces in all types of operations. It was part of a nationwide program involving one-third of the Air National Guard's flying units and inspired by Secretary of Defense Melvin Laird. The C-130A was the backbone of TAC's theater airlift fleet, a medium assault transport with long range (beyond 2,000 miles), high speed (220 to 300 miles per hour), and capable of landing or taking off from a shorter runway than any comparable aircraft. The turbo-prop aircraft with its five-man crew could carry nearly 20 tons of cargo or 92 fully equipped troops, 64 paratroops or 74 litter patients and attendants.

On 8 July 1971 the first C-130A arrived from the 317th Tactical Airlift Wing. About a month later on 9 August, the first C-130 flight with an all Pease Air National Guard crew took place. By September Phase I transition training was underway with both aircrew and support personnel at schools throughout the United States. By early 1972, the 133rd began Phase II (combat readiness) training, and in April, low-level flying and navigational training missions were flown day and night. First drops of paratroopers and cargo began in early May, and in mid-month the squadron passed a "no notice" Twelfth Air Force Management Effectiveness Inspection.

During the summer of 1973, the squadron participated in a joint Army, Air Force, and National Guard-Reserve training exercise. United States Readiness Command training, Exercise Boldfire 1-74, was centered at Camp Joseph T. Robinson, Arkansas. During Exercise Boldfire, ground personnel were airlifted aboard the unit's C-130 aircraft to Fort Campbell, Kentucky. They remained there throughout the exercise, maintaining aircraft. Squadron C-130s dropped paratroops and equipment in support of ground forces. During this time frame, the unit also had a crew participating in Coronet Shamrock, an Air Force-wide airdrop competition,winning the preliminary competition and earning the right to represent the ANG in further competition.

The Energy Crisis caught up with the squadron at the end of 1973, and all flying activity was suspended from 22 December until 7 January 1974, due to fuel shortages throughout the country. In December 1974, the group gaining command once again became MAC when TAC's theater transport mission was transferred to MAC.

==== Air refueling operations ====
===== Strategic Air Command =====
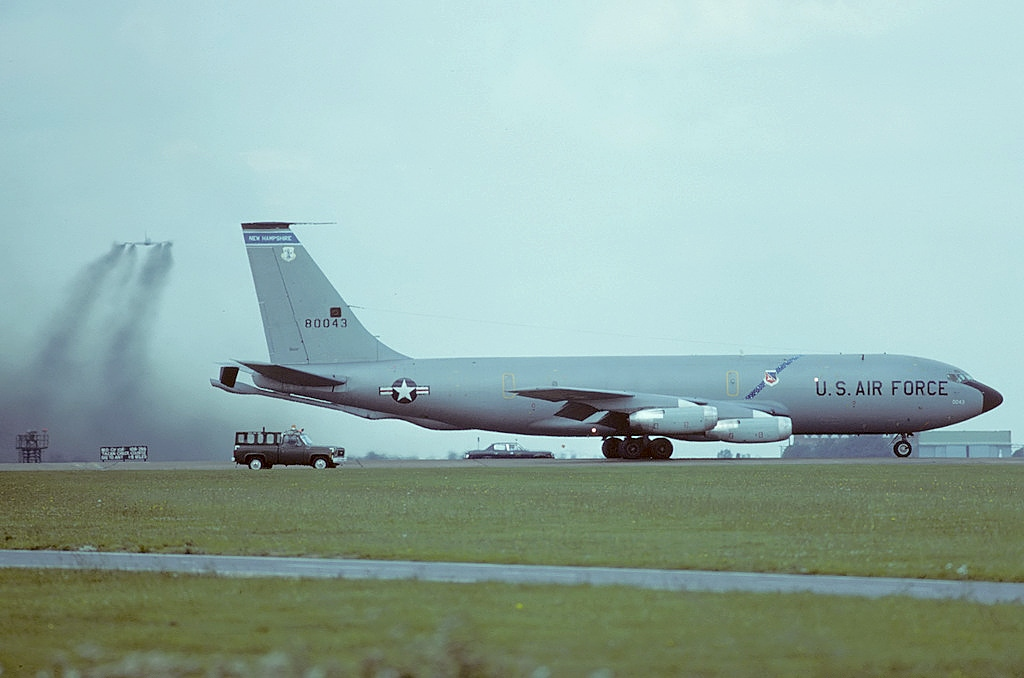
Squadron KC-135 Stratotanker at RAF Mildenhall in 1980 (Note: Aircraft was built as Boeing KC-135A-BN Stratotanker, serial 58-0043, The Finland Queen II. It was modified to KC-135E configuration and transferred to the Aerospace Maintenance and Regeneration Center (AMARC) on 28 April 2008. Dirkx, Marco (6 May 2025). "1958 USAF Serial Numbers". Joe Baugher’s Serial Number List.)

On 1 October 1975, the squadron's gaining command changed from MAC to Strategic Air Command (SAC), becoming a Boeing KC-135 Stratotanker unit. By the end of March 1976, the squadron had largely taken over air refueling support for the 509th Bombardment Wing from its active duty 34th Air Refueling Squadron which was inactivated on 31 March 1976.

By October 1976, the 157th Air Refueling Group and the 509th Bombardment Wing shared the same mission and response times, under the "Total Force Concept". The 133rd deployed to RAF Mildenhall, England, as part of the European Tanker Task Force . Once in England, the unit engaged in friendly competition with active duty flyers in Exercise Giant Voice. The 133rd was also the first Air National Guard unit to air refuel the then-experimental Rockwell B-1A Lancer. A January 1977 inspection rated the 157th Group SAC's first Air National Guard unit to be "fully operationally ready". It became the second ANG unit in SAC history to stand alert with the active force.

During the latter months of 1979, aircraft from the 157th joined forces with 16 KC-135A's providing air refueling support for Exercise Crested Cap. This airpower exercise tested the deployment capability of Air Force fighter aircraft moving from the U.S. to Europe in support of NATO war efforts there. The 157th AREFG finished 1979 by winning the Navigation Trophy at Exercise Giant Voice '79, a competition among SAC, ANG, AFRES, and RAF bomber and air refueling tankers. The 157th was the first Air National Guard or Air Force Reserve unit to win a trophy in the 31-year history of the SAC competition.

During the 1980s, the squadron continued to participate in SAC exercises like Global Shield and Giant Voice. In 1984, the 133rd converted to more fuel efficient KC-135Es and received its first Air Force Outstanding Unit Award. The squadron engaged in routine worldwide deployments with its KC-135s, refueling a 12-aircraft tanker task force that refueled Republic F-105 Thunderchiefs returning from a deployment in Denmark in August 1981's Operation Coronet Rudder. Less than a year later, in February 1982, 160 personnel were deployed to Andersen Air Force Base, Guam, as part of Exercise Pacific Sentry. 133rd KC-135 tankers flew 10,000 miles in support of a mission, a unit distance record. During its 15 days on Guam, the unit conducted missions to Kadena Air Base, Okinawa, Diego Garcia, Clark Air Base, Philippines, Japan, and Australia.

The first squadron female pilot, 1st Lt. Ellen G. Hard, began flying the KC-135E in August 1984. A resident of Arlington, Massachusetts, Hard was recommended attended pilot school at Laughlin Air Force Base, Texas. She had served four years of active duty as a personnel officer at Lackland Air Force Base, Texas, and Hanscom Air Force Base, Massachusetts. Lt. Hard trained on both the KC-135A and KC-135E models.

===== Pease AFB closure =====
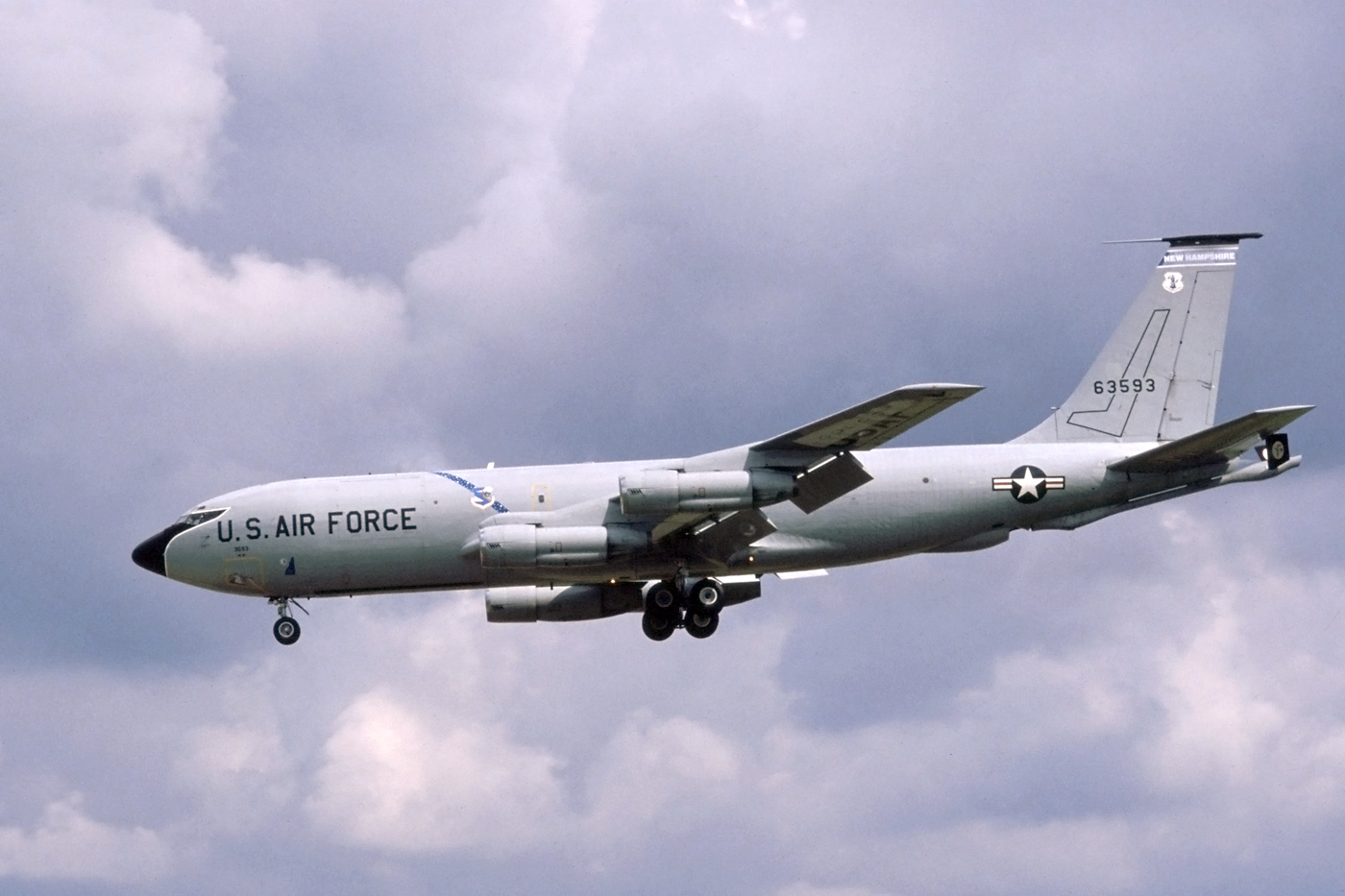
Squadron KC-135E Stratotanker arriving at RAF Mildenhall in 1989 (Note: Aircraft is Boeing KC-135E Stratotanker, serial 56-3593 Live Free or Die. Built as Boeing KC-135A-BN. It was transferred to AMARC on 13 June 2007. Dirkx, Marco (23 September 2025). "1956 USAF Serial Numbers". Joe Baugher’s Serial Number List.)

In 1989, the first Base Realignment and Closure Commission recommended the closure of Pease Air Force Base. As part of the closure process, a Pease Redevelopment Commission was established to plan the closure and redevelopment of the base. On 1 August 1999 it was determined that the 157th Air Refueling Group would remain at Pease, and the facility would be redeveloped as a civilian airport.

It took only two years for the active component to complete departure activities, including transferring personnel and assets to other military installations. Pease Airport opened for civilian use through an airfield joint use agreement with the USAF on 19 July 1991. Base closure Law directed that the 157th Group be consolidated into a cantonment area. 220 acres (89 ha)s were identified and retained by the USAF for the group's continued mission. On 1 April 1991, SAC turned control of Pease to the Department of Defense, and the active military base was closed. The remaining Air National Guard portion of the now-civilian facility was renamed Pease Air National Guard Base.

===== 1990/1991 Gulf Crisis =====
Early on the morning of 7 August 1990, Operation Desert Shield, a build-up of friendly forces designed to contain the spread of Iraqi aggression, began. A telephone alert asked every crew member of the 133rd Air Refueling Squadron to provide maximum availability so that an immediate response capability could be developed. All crew members stepped forward in voluntary support. The unit began functioning on a 24-hour, seven-days-a-week basis. Forty-two Desert Shield missions would be flown in the month of August as the 133rd helped refuel transport aircraft and fighters heading to United States Air Forces Central (CENTAF) bases in the Middle East. Forty volunteers were placed on full active duty status for as long as needed. Close to 100 guard members reported during the next few days as seven additional airplanes arrived from Ohio, Pennsylvania, and New Jersey ANG units, forming an Air National Guard tanker task force. By 1 October, the task force support of MAC flights in transit from the West Coast to bases in Saudi Arabia began to slow. The squadron was tasked with providing refueling support to Air Force units deployed to Saudi Arabia.

On 12 October, the squadron began deployment of its assets to Saudi Arabia to join the 1709th Air Refueling Wing (Provisional) at King Abdul Aziz Air Base, Jeddah. Personnel and aircraft were dispersed at several locations in the Middle East, including Al Banteen Air Base, Abu Dhabi, United Arab Emirates; Morón Air Base, Spain; Cairo West Air Base, Egypt; and other locations. By January 1991, the build-up of men and material in-theater was complete. Operation Desert Storm, the attack phase of the Allied plan to liberate Kuwait and destroy Iraq's army, was ready to begin. With its strategic location on the Atlantic shore, the squadron mission reverted to an air bridge mode, refueling transiting aircraft heading across the Atlantic or inbound from RAF Mildenhall, England, which served on the other end of the transatlantic route to the Middle East. After a short ground combat, Kuwait was liberated by Coalition ground forces. The 133rd, its aircraft festooned with yellow ribbons painted above the boom, remained in air-bridge mode, supporting the returning traffic.

===== Air Mobility Command =====
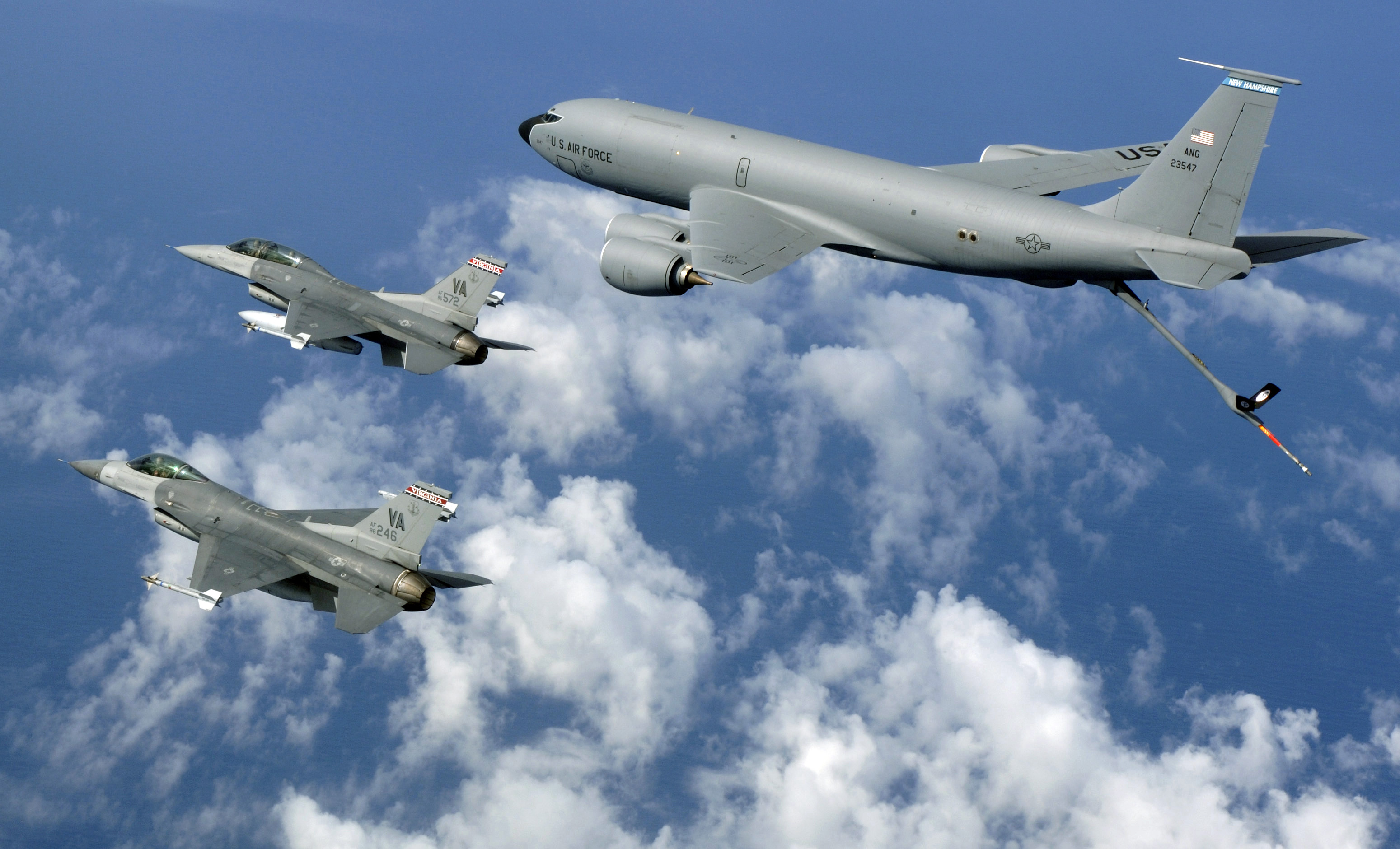
Squadron Stratotankers refueling Virginia ANG F-16 Fighting Falcons in 2005

In July 1991, 100 Russian children from the nuclear-contaminated Chernobyl area flew into Pease to attend summer camps. The Samantha Smith Foundation flight saw a Soviet Ilyushin Il-62 land for the first time at a SAC base. Parked just a few hundred feet away, in an ironic twist, was Air Force One. President George H. W. Bush ordered the end of ground alert on 1 October,

In May 1992, with the end of the Cold War, the 157th adopted the Air Force Objective Organization plan, and in 1994 the unit was redesignated as the 157th Air Refueling Wing. The 133rd was assigned to the new 157th Operations Group. A month later, on 1 June, SAC was inactivated as part of the Air Force reorganization after the end of the Cold War. It was replaced by Air Combat Command (ACC). In 1993, ACC transferred its KC-135 tanker force to the new Air Mobility Command (AMC).

By mid-1993, the 133rd's 10 KC-135E aircraft were replaced with quieter, more efficient KC-135Rs. With their new CFM International CFM56 engines, a 50 percent decrease in noise resulted, and emissions were reduced 90 percent, while range, fuel off-load capability, and reliability were all increased. By January 1994 all the unit's KC-135's had been converted to KC-135Rs.

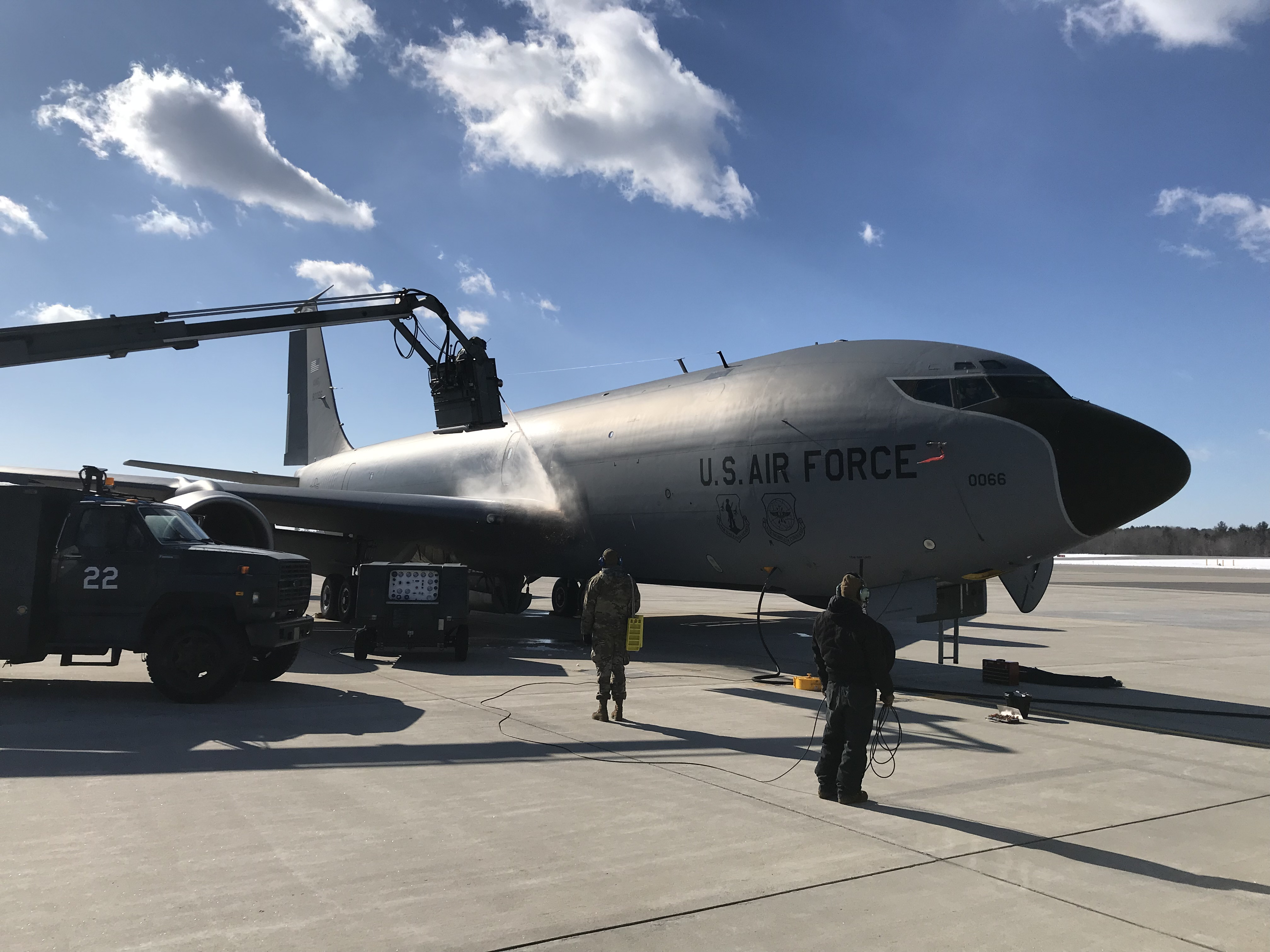
KC-135R Stratotanker at Pease in March 2019 (Note: Aircraft is KC-135R, serial 58-0066.)

The unit engaged in routine deployments and training until 1994 when the 157th began operating in the Northeast Tanker Task Force together with the Maine Air National Guard. The situation in Bosnia-Herzegovina and Operation Deny Flight continued to involve squadron aircraft and crews. In December, 52 unit members deployed with Niagara Falls' 107th Air Refueling Wing to Pisa Airport, Italy. At Pease, Operation Phoenix Moat missions required unit participation to help with the flow of personnel and materiel to the area. The mission in Bosnia was renamed Operation Joint Endeavor and, finally, Operation Decisive Endeavor, as the crisis cooled. Consolidating assets, the Air Guard left Istres Air Base, France, and operated exclusively out of Pisa, rotating units through on a month-to-month basis. The squadron's turn came again in October 1996.

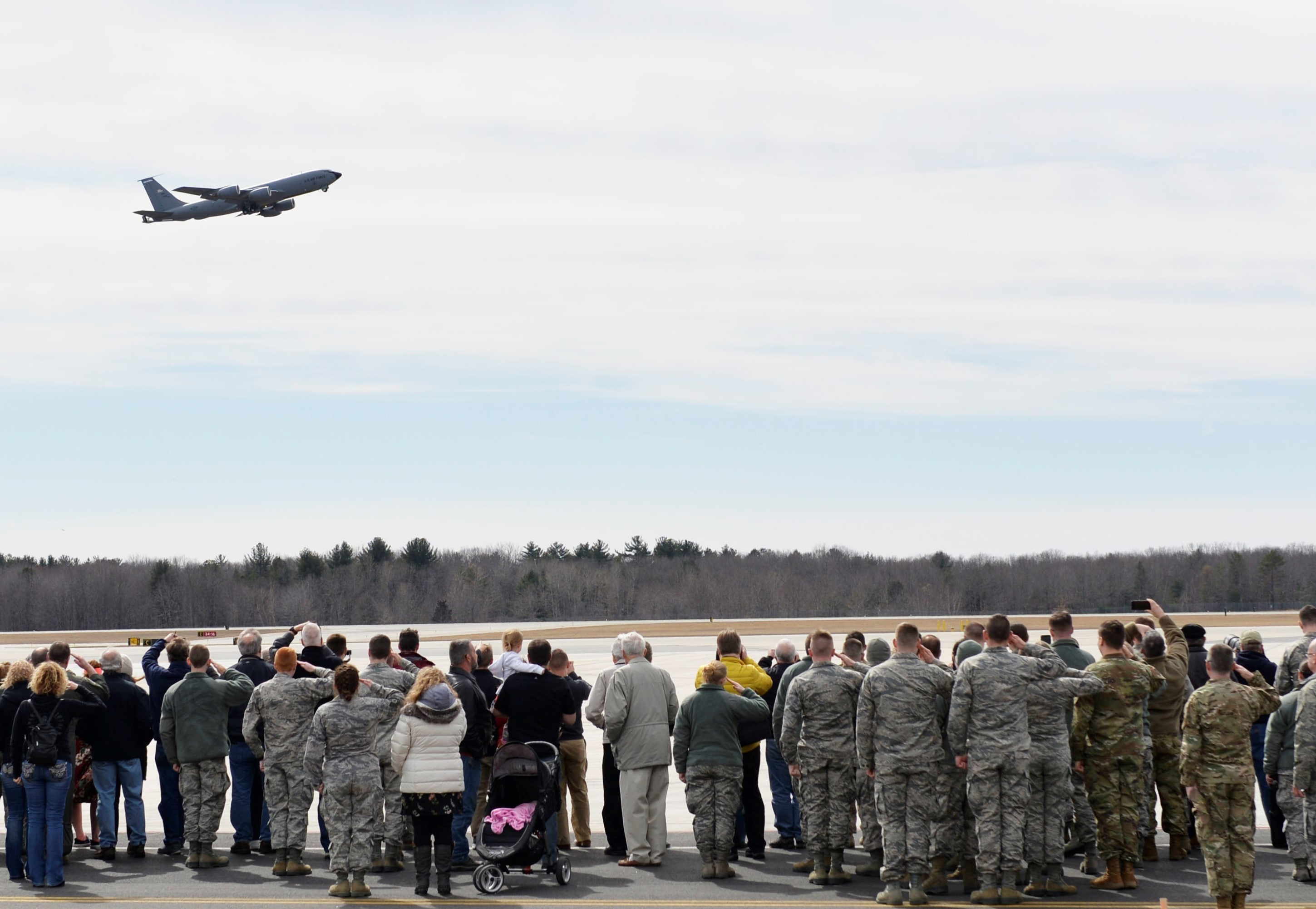
The last squadron KC-135R departing Pease on 24 March 2019. (Note: Aircraft is Boeing KC-135R Stratotanker, serial 57-1419. Built as Boeing KC-135A-BN. At the time of its departure, this was the oldest aircraft in the USAF inventory. Dirkx, Marco (23 September 2025). "1957 USAF Serial Numbers". Joe Baugher’s Serial Number List.)

By 1997, the squadron had already been rotating members through Incirlik Air Base, Turkey, as part of Operation Northern Watch, enforcing the no-fly zone over northern Iraq. Three months later, in February 1998, the squadron, augmented by four transient aircraft, flew 28 sorties offloading gas to an air convoy carrying Army personnel and equipment from Georgia to the theater area. In the face of mounting U.S. military might, Saddam Hussein backed down.

The year 2000 saw the squadron provide support to Operation Joint Forge as well as other operational and training missions. During Operation Joint Forge, it flew 55 sorties, offloading over one and one half million pounds of fuel to operational fighters and surveillance aircraft off the coast of the former republic of Yugoslavia.

It also provided support to the Clean Hunter 2000 NATO exercise, with a deployment to Karup Air Base, Denmark. It deployed to fill expeditionary combat support shortfalls for Operation Southern Watch and Operation Northern Watch, NORAD alert in Iceland and Alaska, support of NATO in Germany and individual rotations to Operation Joint Forge in Istres, France.

In its 2005 BRAC Recommendations, the Department of Defense recommended that the 163d Air Refueling Wing of the California Air National Guard would distribute three KC-135R aircraft to the squadron and place additional force structure at Pease to support the Northeast Tanker Task Force increasing the squadron to 12 aircraft.

===== KC-46 Pegasus =====
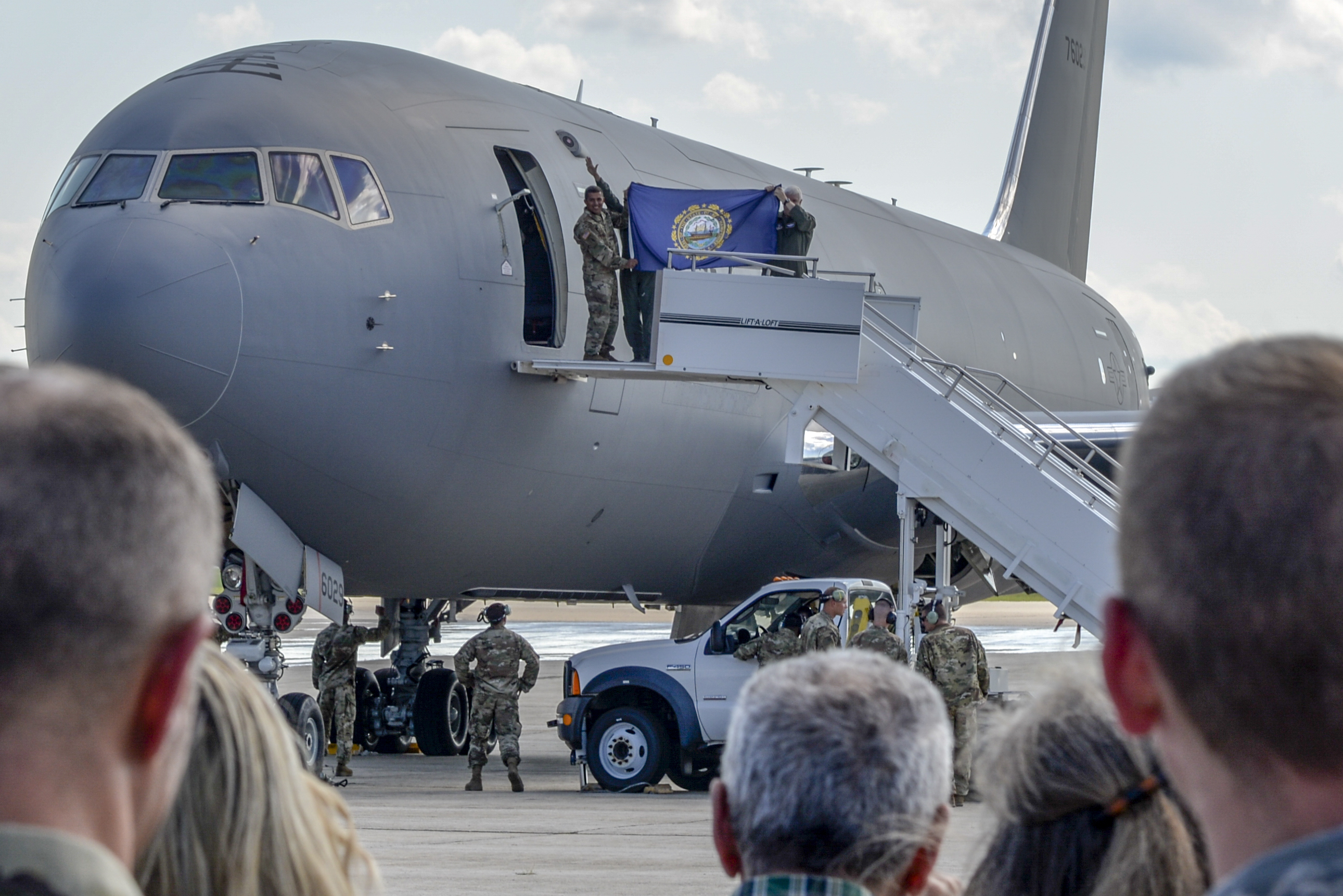
The first KC-46A Pegasus arriving at Pease on 8 August 2019. (Note: Aircraft is Boeing KC-46A, serial 17-46029 Spirit of Newington.)

On 22 May 2013, Air Force officials announced the preferred and reasonable alternatives for the first Boeing KC-46 Pegasus aircraft training and main operating bases. Pease was selected as the preferred alternative for the first Air National Guard KC-46A main operating base. In August 2014, Air Force leaders announced that the 133rd would become the first Air National Guard unit to equip with the KC-46A. The Pegasus was scheduled to enter the Air Force inventory during fiscal year 2019. On 31 January 2019, two KC-135Rs departed Pease in preparation for arrival of the KC-46A later in the year. The final KC-135 at Pease, 57-1419, departed on 24 March 2019, for Goldwater Air National Guard Base in Phoenix, Arizona. The first KC-46A arrived at Pease on 8 August 2019. The 12th and final KC-46A was delivered on 5 February 2021.

== Lineage ==
- Constituted as the 383rd Bombardment Squadron (Light) on 28 January 1942

Activated on 2 March 1942
Redesignated 383rd Bombardment Squadron (Dive) on 27 July 1942
Redesignated 529th Fighter-Bomber Squadron on 30 September 1943
Redesignated 529th Fighter Squadron on 30 May 1944
Inactivated on 6 January 1946
Redesignated 133rd Fighter Squadron, Single Engine and allotted to the National Guard on 24 May 1946
Organized on 17 February 1947
Extended federal recognition on 4 April 1947
Federalized and ordered to active service on 1 February 1951,
Redesignated 133rd Fighter-Interceptor Squadron on 10 February 1951,
Released from active duty and returned to New Hampshire state control on 1 November 1952,
Redesignated 133rd Air Transport Squadron on 1 September 1960
Federalized and ordered to active service on 1 October 1961
Released from active duty and returned to New Hampshire state control on 31 August 1962 (Note: On 20 June 1962, the Air Force directed the squadron be redesignated the 133rd Combat Airlift Squadron effective 1 July 1962. This action was revoked on 27 June 1962 before becoming effective.)
Redesignated 133rd Military Airlift Squadron on 1 January 1966
Inactivated on 10 September 1971
Consolidated with the 133rd Air Refueling Squadron on 18 August 1987

133rd Air Refueling Squadron

- Constituted as the 133rd Tactical Airlift Squadron

Activated on 11 September 1971
Redesignated 133rd Air Refueling Squadron, Heavy on 1 October 1975
Consolidated with the 133rd Military Airlift Squadron on 18 August 1987
Federalized and ordered to active service on 12 October 1990
Released from active duty and returned to New Hampshire state control, 31 March 1991
Redesignated 133rd Air Refueling Squadron on 16 March 1992

=== Assignments ===
- 311th Bombardment Group (later 311th Fighter-Bomber Group, 311th Fighter Group), 2 March 1942 – 6 January 1946
- 101st Fighter Group, 4 April 1947
- 101st Fighter-Interceptor Wing, 10 February 1951 (attached to 33d Fighter-Interceptor Wing after 21 July 1951),
- 4707th Defense Wing, 6 February 1952,
- 101st Fighter-Interceptor Group, 1 November 1952
- 101st Fighter-Interceptor Wing, 1 April 1954
- 101st Fighter-Interceptor Group (later 101st Fighter Group, 157th Air Transport Group, 157th Military Airlift Group), 1 July 1954 – 10 September 1971
- 157th Tactical Airlift Group (later 157th Air Refueling Group), 11 September 1971
- 157th Operations Group 31 May 1992 – present

=== Stations ===
- Will Rogers Field, Oklahoma, 2 March 1942
- Hunter Field, Georgia, 4 July 1942
- Waycross Army Air Field, Georgia, 22 October 1942 – 18 July 1943
- Nawadih Airfield, India, 14 September 1943
- Dinjan Airfield, India, 18 October 1943 (detachment operated from Kurmitola Airfield, India, 21 October–November 1943; 28 May – 11 June 1944)
- Kwanghan Airfield, China, 21 October 1944 (detachment operated from Hsian Airfield, China, 30 October 1944 – 21 February 1945)
- Pungchacheng Airfield, China, 5 May 1945
- Hsian Airfield, China, August 1945
- Shanghai, China, 22 October – 14 December 1945
- Fort Lawton, Washington, 4–6 Jan 1946
- Grenier Field, New Hampshire, 4 April 1947 – 1 November 1952,
- Grenier Field (later Grenier Air Force Base), New Hampshire, 1 November 1952
- Pease Air Force Base (later Pease Air National Guard Base), New Hampshire, January 1966 – present

=== Aircraft ===
- Vultee V-72 Vengeance, 1942
- North American A-36 Apache, 1942–1944
- North American P-51C Mustang, 1944–1945
- Republic F-47D Thunderbolt, 1947–1952
- North American F-51H Mustang, 1952–1954
- Lockheed F-94A/B Starfire, 1954–1958
- North American F-86L Sabre, 1958–1960
- Boeing C-97A Stratofreighter, 1960–1967
- Douglas C-124C Globemaster II, 1967–1971
- Lockheed C-130A Hercules, 1971–1975
- Boeing KC-135A Stratotanker, 1975–1984
- Boeing KC-135E Stratotanker, 1984–1993
- Boeing KC-135R Stratotanker, 1993 – 24 March 2019
- Boeing KC-46A Pegasus, 8 August 2019 – present

=== Awards and campaigns ===
Award streamer	Award	Dates	Notes
	Air Force Outstanding Unit Award	1 July 1977–30 June 1979	133rd Air Refueling Squadron
	Air Force Outstanding Unit Award	1 July 1979–30 June 1980	133rd Air Refueling Squadron
	Air Force Outstanding Unit Award	1 July 1980–30 June 1982	133rd Air Refueling Squadron
	Air Force Outstanding Unit Award	1 July 1983–30 June 1985	133rd Air Refueling Squadron
	Air Force Outstanding Unit Award	16 January 1991–15 January 1992	133rd Air Refueling Squadron
	Air Force Outstanding Unit Award	1 July 1999–30 June 2001	133rd Air Refueling Squadron
	Air Force Outstanding Unit Award	1 September 2006–31 August 2008	133rd Air Refueling Squadron

Campaign Streamer	Campaign	Dates	Notes
	India-Burma	14 September 1943–24 August 1944	383rd Bombardment Squadron (later 529th Fighter-Bomber Squadron, 529th Fighter Squadron)
	China Defensive	24 August 1944–4 May 1945	529th Fighter Squadron)
	China Offensive	5 May 1945–2 September 1945	529th Fighter Squadron)
