= 385th Bombardment Squadron =

US Air Force squadron

385th Bombardment Squadron (later 785th Tactical Air Support Training Squadron)
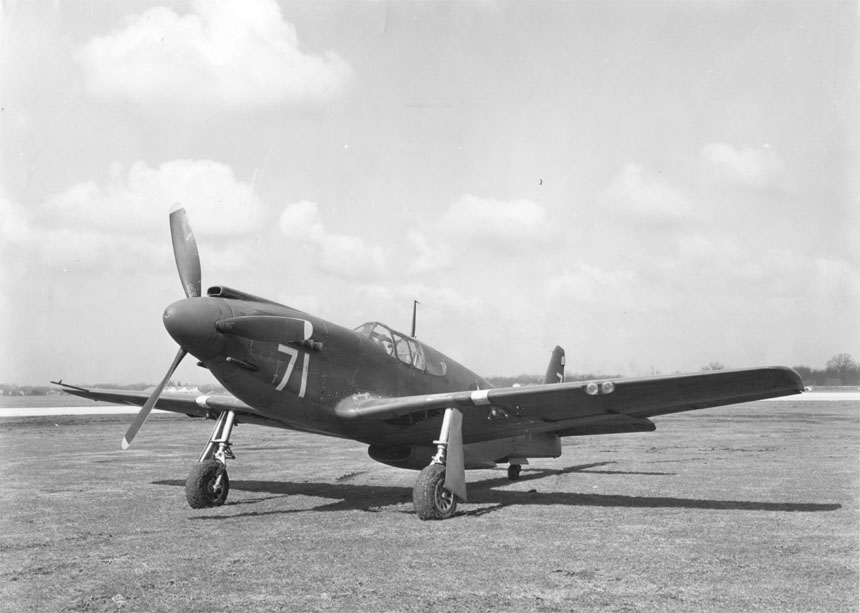
- A-36 Apache as flown by the squadron
- Active: 1942–1943; 1964
- Country: United States
- Branch: United States Air Force
- Role: fighter
- Engagements: China-Burma-India Theater

Insignia
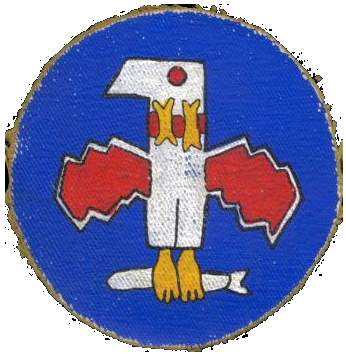
- 385th Bombardment Squadron emblem (Note: Approved 10 October 1942. Description: On a blue disc, a stylized "Bomberwocky" white, with Shawnee yellow color band around neck, eye red, red flash markings on wings, feet yellow , grasping a white aerial bomb fesswise.)

The 385th Bombardment Squadron was a United States Army Air Forces unit active during World War II. After training in the United States, it deployed to the China-Burma-India Theater, but was disbanded shortly after arriving in India. The 785th Tactical Fighter Squadron was activated along with the 32nd Tactical Fighter Wing at George Air Force Base, California in April 1964. However, in July 1964, the 8th Tactical Fighter Wing replaced the 32d Wing and the 785th transferred its personnel and equipment to another squadron. The two squadrons were consolidated in 1985 as the 785th Tactical Air Support Training Squadron, but the consolidated squadron has not been active.

== History ==
=== 385th Bombardment Squadron ===
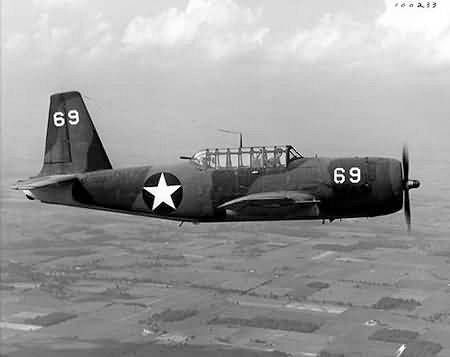
Vultee Vengeance of a training unit in the United States. (Note: Note the American national insigne, but Royal Air Force camouflage.)

The squadron was first activated at Will Rogers Field, Oklahoma in March 1942 as one of the four original squadrons of the 311th Bombardment Group. In July, the group moved to Waycross Army Air Field. It primarily trained with Vultee V-72 Vengeance dive bombers, which had been ordered for the Royal Air Force, but which were impressed by the Army Air Forces after the United States entered World War II. Shortly after its arrival, it was redesignated as a dive bomber squadron, along with other Army Air Forces (AAF) single engine bomber units. 1943 saw an upgrade to North American A-36 Apaches. The squadron completed its training and departed the United States for the China-Burma-India Theater in July 1943.

The squadron arrived Nawadih Airfield, India in mid-September 1943, after a brief pause in Australia. However, the AAF was again reorganizing its dive bomber groups as fighter bomber units. Fighter bomber groups, however, were made up of three, rather than four squadrons. As a result, the 385th was disbanded on 30 September 1943 before it could fly any combat missions.

=== 785th Tactical Fighter Squadro ===
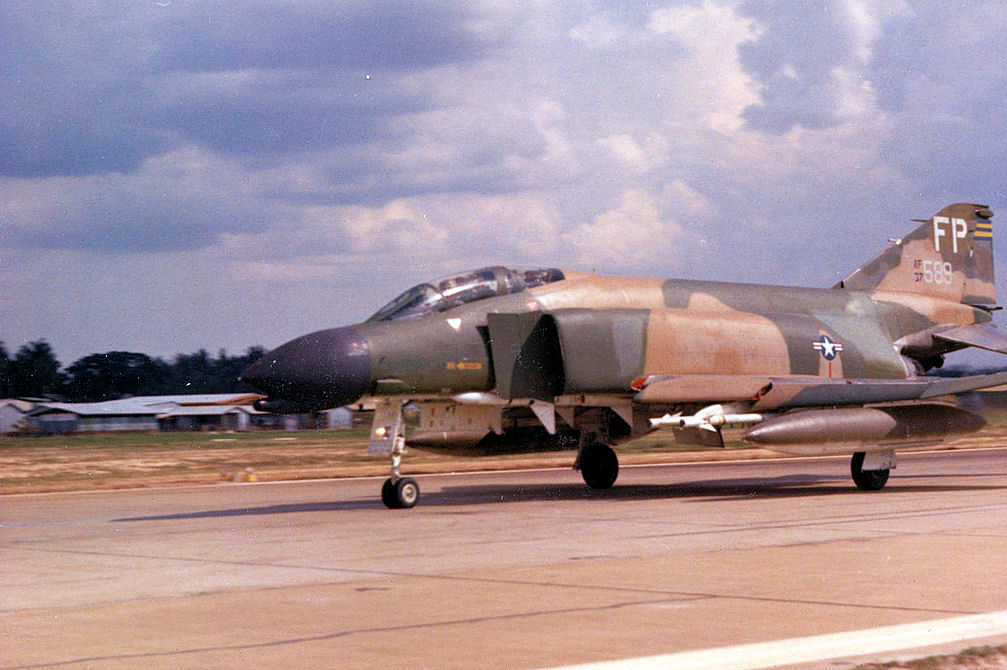
497th Tactical Fighter Squadron F-4C Phantom II (Note: Aircraft is McDonnell F-4C-19-MC Phantom, serial 63-7589. This airplane went to the Aerospace Maintenance and Regeneration Center on 21 January 1987.)

The 785th Tactical Fighter Squadron was activated with the 32nd Tactical Fighter Wing at George Air Force Base, California in April 1964. It soon began to train with the McDonnell F-4 Phantom II. However, the 8th Tactical Fighter Wing, which was drawing down in Japan moved on paper to George in July and replaced the 32nd Wing. As a result, the 785th was inactivated and its assets were transferred to the 497th Tactical Fighter Squadron.

The 385th Bombardment Squadron was consolidated with the 785th Tactical Fighter Squadron as the 785th Tactical Air Support Training Squadron on 19 September 1985.

== Lineage ==
385th Bombardment Squadron

- Constituted as the 385th Bombardment Squadron (Light) on 28 January 1942

Activated on 2 March 1942
Redesignated 385th Bombardment Squadron (Dive) on 27 July 1942
Disbanded on 30 September 1943

- Consolidated with the 785th Tactical Fighter Squadron as the 785th Tactical Air Support Training Squadron on 19 September 1985

785th Tactical Fighter Squadron

- Constituted as the 785th Tactical Fighter Squadron and activated on 6 April 1964

Organized on 1 April 1964
Discontinued and inactivated on 25 July 1964

- Consolidated with the 385th Bombardment Squadron as the 785th Tactical Air Support Training Squadron on 19 September 1985

=== Assignments ===
- 311th Bombardment Group, 2 March 1942 – 30 September 1943
- 32nd Tactical Fighter Wing, 1 April 1964 – 25 July 1964

=== Stations ===
- Will Rogers Field, Oklahoma, 2 March 1942
- Hunter Field, Georgia, 4 July 1942
- Waycross Army Air Field, Georgia, 22 October 1942 – 18 July 1943
- Nawadih Airfield, India, c. 17–30 September 1943
- George Air Force Base, California, 1 April 1964 – 25 July 1964

=== Aircraft ===
- Vultee V-72, 1942
- North American A-36 Apache, 1943
- McDonnell F-4 Phantom II, 1964

=== Campaigns ===
Campaign Streamer	Campaign	Dates	Notes
	American Theater without inscription	2 March 1942 – 18 July 1943	385th Bombardment Squadron
	China Burma India Theater without inscription	c. 17–30 September 1943	385th Bombardment Squadron

== See also ==
- List of F-4 Phantom II operators
