= Nawadih Airfield =

Wartime United States Army Air Forces airfield in India (1944–1945)

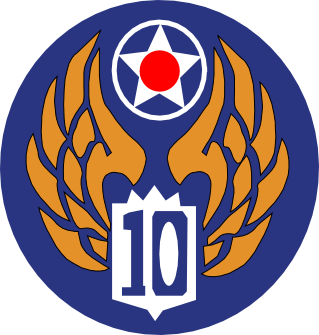
Nawadih Airfield
- Part of Tenth Air Force
- Nawadih, India

Site information
- Type: Military airfield
- Controlled by: United States Army Air Forces

Location
- Coordinates: 24°36′32″N 084°54′15″E (Approximate)

Site history
- Built: 1944
- In use: 1944-1945
- Battles/wars: Burma Campaign 1944-1945

Nawadih Airfield is a former wartime United States Army Air Forces airfield in India used during the Burma Campaign 1944-1945. It is now abandoned.

== History ==
The airfield was the temporary home of the 311th Fighter Group during September and October 1943 prior to its moving east into West Bengal and closer to the front lines in Burma. It remained open as a combat communications radio relay facility and C-46 Commando and C-47 Skytrain transport airfield until 15 September 1945 when it was closed.
