= New Hampshire Wing Civil Air Patrol =

- New Hampshire Wing of Civil Air Patrol

Associated branches
- United States Air Force

Command staff
- Commander: Col Dominic "Nic" Goupil, CAP
- Deputy Commander: Lt Col Darlene Cray
- Chief of Staff: Maj Dana Hylen

Current statistics
- Cadets: 251
- Seniors: 329
- Total Membership: 580
- Website: nhwg.cap.gov
- Statistics as of May 2024

The New Hampshire Wing of the Civil Air Patrol (NHWG) is the highest echelon of the Civil Air Patrol (CAP) in New Hampshire, in the United States. Its headquarters is located in Concord, New Hampshire, near the Concord Municipal Airport. The New Hampshire Wing is part of the Northeast Region of CAP.

It currently has 9 squadrons and 1 flight: the Concord Composite Squadron (Concord), the Greater Nashua Composite Squadron (Nashua), the Hawk Composite Squadron (Laconia), the Monadnock Composite Squadron (Keene), the Seacoast Composite Squadron (Portsmouth), the Lebanon Composite Squadron (Lebanon), the Highlanders Cadet Flight (Rochester), the Manchester Composite Squadron (Manchester), the Woodsville Cadet Squadron (Woodsville) and the Mount Washington Flight (Whitefield).

== Mission ==
The Civil Air Patrol has three missions: providing emergency services; offering cadet programs for youth; and providing aerospace education for CAP members and the general public.

Members of the New Hampshire Wing have flown missions searching aerially for forest fires. The New Hampshire Wing, alongside Civil Air Patrol wings from other states, provided aerial photography of the damage caused by Hurricane Sandy along the east coast of the United States at the request of FEMA.

== Membership ==
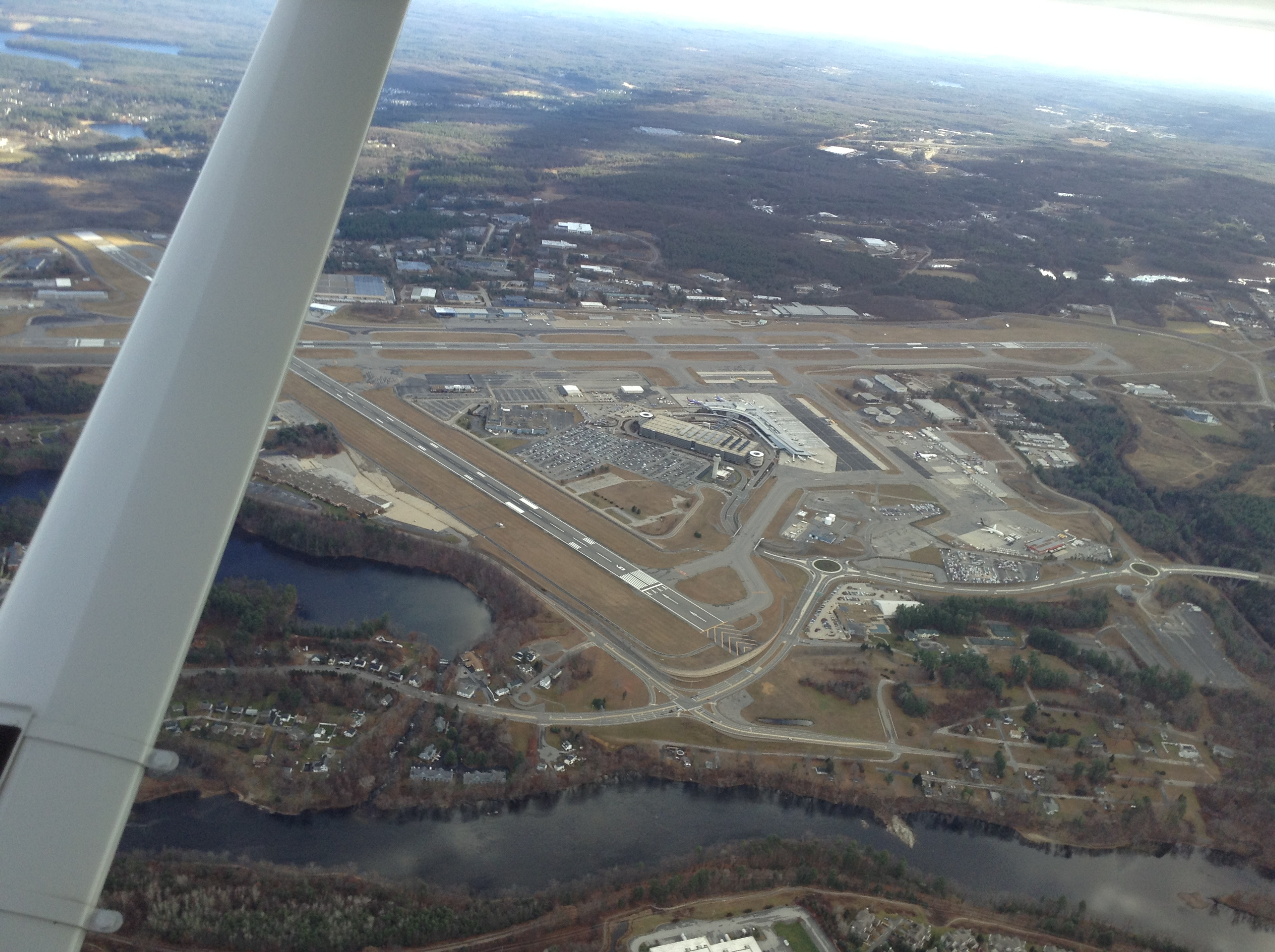
Manchester-Boston Regional Airport from CAP airplane

Youth aged 12-18 may join the Civil Air Patrol as cadets in a cadet squadron, and may continue to serve as a cadet until the age of 21. Adult members aged 18 and older may join a senior squadron, or be assigned to a cadet squadron in a management capacity. Composite squadrons may contain both cadet and senior programs.

== Organization ==
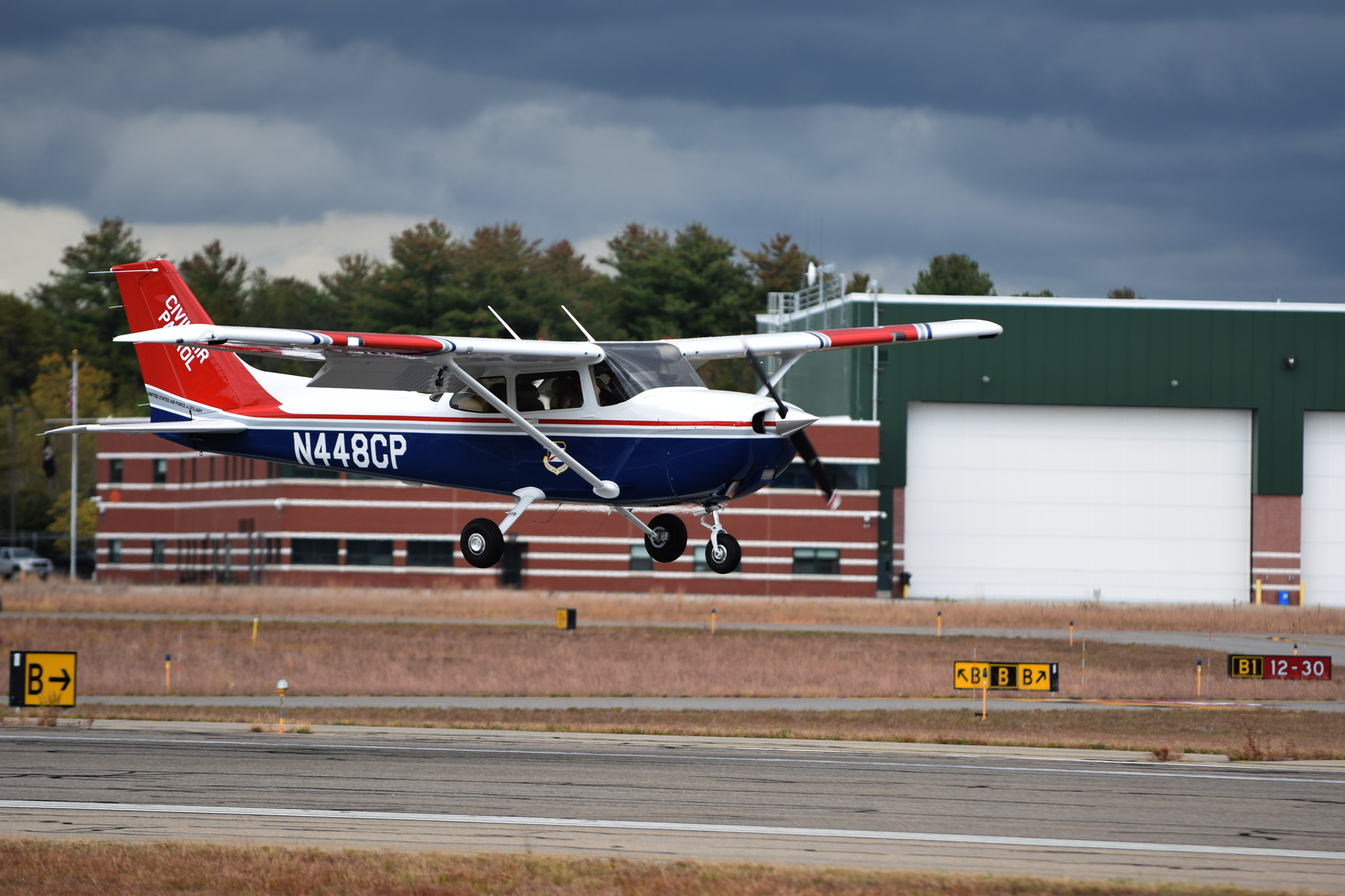
New Hampshire CAP's newest Cessna 172 arrives at Concord Municipal Airport on 06 Oct 2020.

Squadrons of the New Hampshire Wing
Designation	Squadron name	Location	Notes
NH014	Lebanon Composite Squadron	Lebanon	
NH016	Greater Nashua Composite Squadron	Nashua	
NH010	Seacoast Composite Squadron	Portsmouth	
NH023	Woodsville Cadet Squadron	Woodsville	
NH032	Concord Composite Squadron	Concord	
NH037	Highlanders Cadet Squadron	Rochester	
NH053	Monadnock Composite Squadron	Keene	
NH054	Manchester Composite Squadron	Manchester	
NH056	Hawk Composite Squadron	Laconia	
NH075	Mount Washington Composite Squadron	Whitefield	

== Resources ==
As of May 2020, New Hampshire Wing has 5 single-engine planes (1 Cessna 172 Skyhawk, 3 Cessna 182 Skylanes and a Cessna T206H Stationaire). The wing also has 15 vehicles, principally 10-15 passenger vans at each of the squadrons. There are also 5 fixed radio repeaters around the state, 2 airborne-capable portable repeaters, about 120 fixed and mobile VHF stations, and 22 HF radio stations.

== Congressional Gold Medal ==
In January 2015, thirteen original members of the New Hampshire Wing of the Civil Air Patrol were presented the Congressional Gold Medal in a ceremony at the Aviation Museum of New Hampshire. This medal and the Presidential Medal of Freedom are the highest civilian awards in the United States. It is awarded to persons "who have performed an achievement that has an impact on American history and culture that is likely to be recognized as a major achievement in the recipient's field long after the achievement." In May 2014, the medal was jointly awarded to over 200,000 wartime members of the Civil Air Patrol by Pub. L. 113–108 (text) (PDF) for their service during World War II.

On December 10, 2018, Air Force Secretary Heather Wilson was presented with the Civil Air Patrol Congressional Gold Medal in honor of her late grandfather, former New Hampshire Wing Commander Colonel George "Scotty" Wilson. Colonel Wilson served as a CAP pilot during World War II and later as the third New Hampshire Wing Commander, from November 1948 until September 1954.

The medal is on permanent display at the Smithsonian Institution, while three-inch bronze replicas have been presented to individuals and family members in New Hampshire and elsewhere.

== See also ==
- Awards and decorations of the Civil Air Patrol
- New Hampshire Air National Guard
- New Hampshire State Guard
