= New Hampshire Army National Guard =

Component of the US Army and military of the U.S. state of New Hampshire

- Emblem of the New Hampshire National Guard
- Active: 1679-present
- Country: United States
- Allegiance: New Hampshire
- Branch: United States Army
- Role: United States Army National Guard
- Part of: New Hampshire National Guard
- Garrison/HQ: Concord, New Hampshire

Commanders
- Civilian leadership: President of the United States; Secretary of the Air Force; Governor of New Hampshire
- Military leadership: Maj. Gen. David J. Mikolaities (Adjutant General of New Hampshire); Brig. Gen. John A. LeBlanc (Commander, NH ARNG)

Insignia
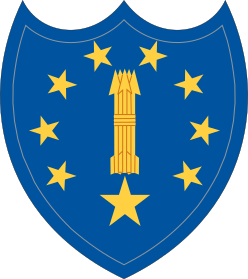
- New Hampshire Army National Guard SSI

- New Hampshire National Guard Crest

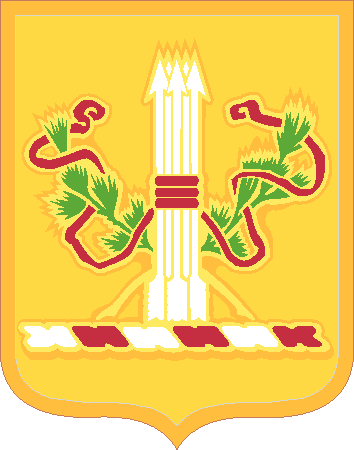
- New Hampshire Army National Guard 54th Troop Command DUI

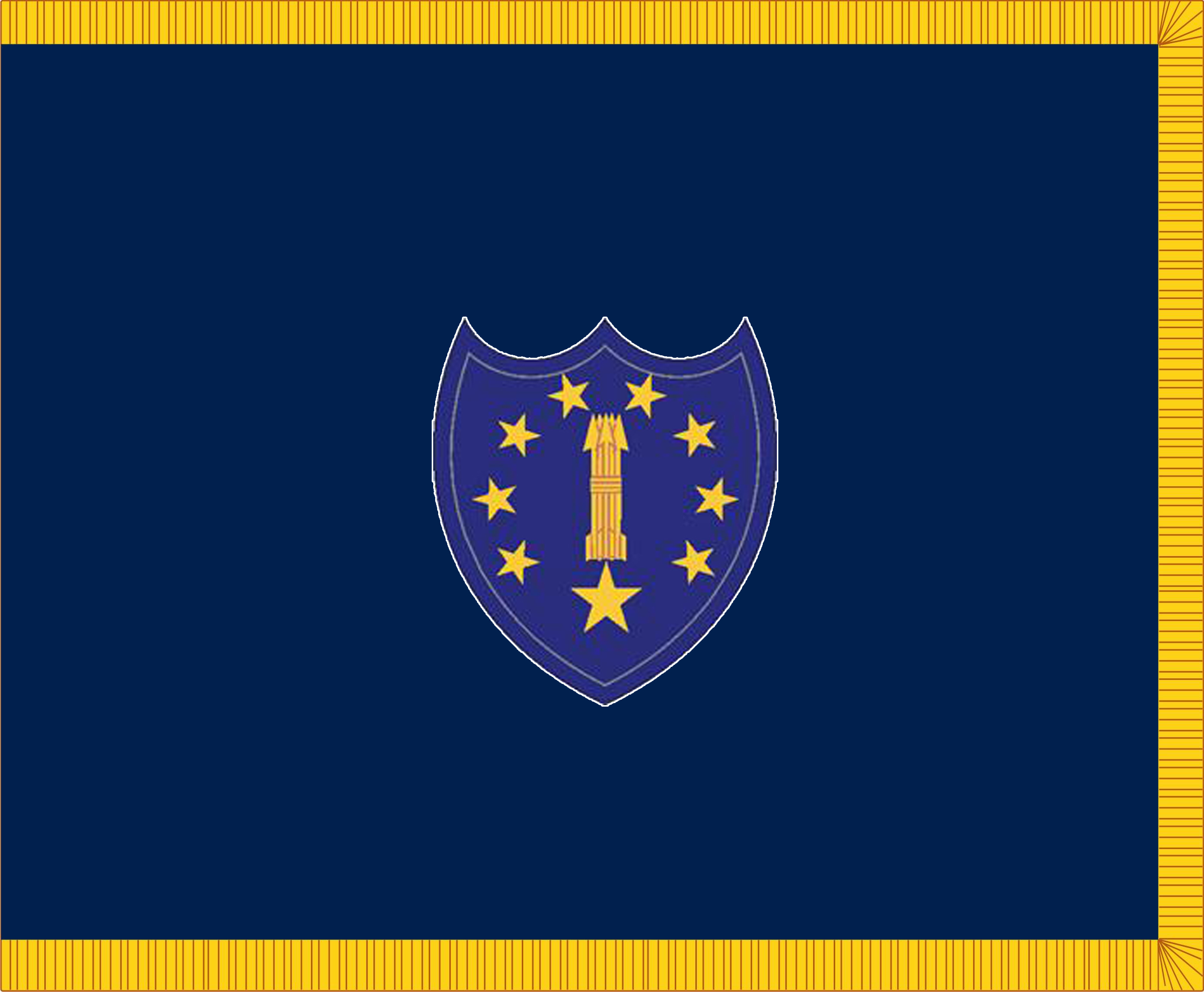
- New Hampshire Army National Guard Headquarters Flag

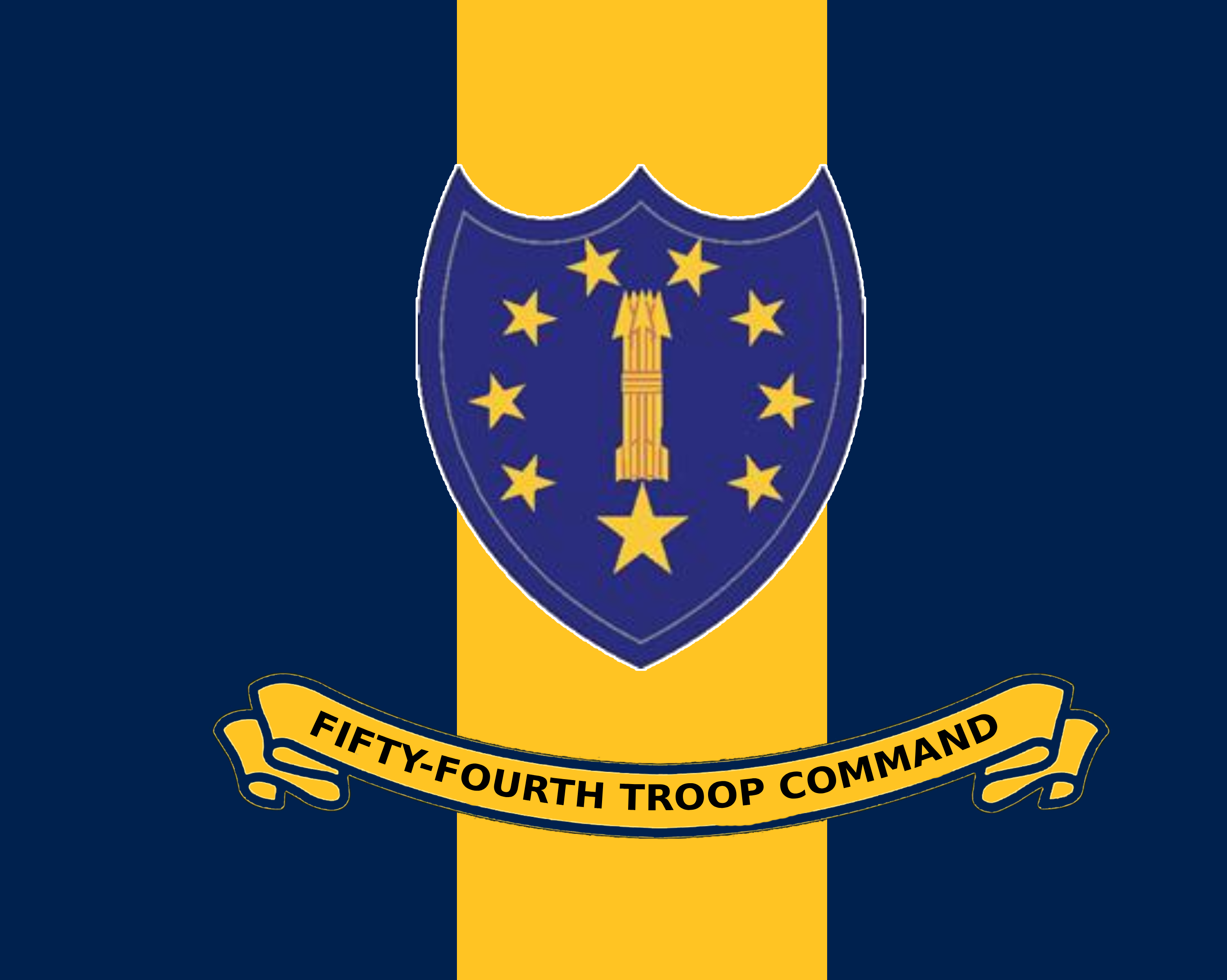
- New Hampshire Army National Guard 54th Troop Command Flag

The New Hampshire Army National Guard is a federal military reserve force of the Army National Guard of the U.S. state of New Hampshire. Along with the New Hampshire Air National Guard, it is an element of the New Hampshire National Guard.

As a state militia, units in the New Hampshire Army National Guard are not in the normal United States Army chain of command. They are under the jurisdiction of the governor of New Hampshire through the office of the Adjutant General of New Hampshire, unless they are federalized by order of the president of the United States.

== History ==
A New Hampshire militia dates to 1679 (as seen on the New Hampshire National Guard emblem) when the Province of New Hampshire was a colony of England and later a British province.

The lineal ancestor of the Headquarters and Headquarters Battery, the 197th Field Artillery Brigade, began life as the Concord Volunteers in 1861. They were mustered into federal service 3 June 1861 at Portsmouth as Company E, 2d New Hampshire Volunteer Infantry; mustered out of federal service 19 December 1865 at Cabin Point, Virginia. They were involved in the U.S. Civil War battles of Bull Run, the Peninsula, Manassas, Fredericksburg, Gettysburg, Cold Harbor, and Petersburg in Virginia from 1862 to 1864.

After the end of World War I, the New Hampshire National Guard was reorganized in 1921–1922 as a pure artillery force composed of the 172nd Field Artillery Regiment (155 mm howitzer) and the 197th Coast Artillery Regiment (Antiaircraft). Despite the Coast Artillery designation, the 197th was actually equipped with anti-aircraft guns.

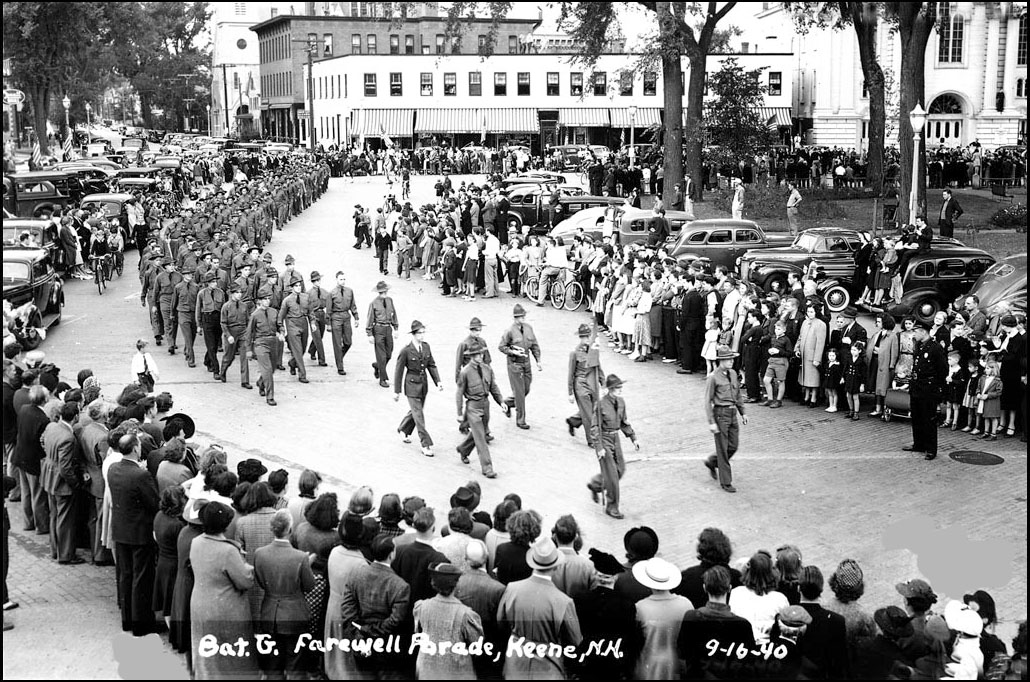
New Hampshire Army National Guardsmen in 1940

During World War II, the New Hampshire National Guard was mobilized into federal service on 16 September 1940. The 197th Coast Artillery was sent to Australia in 1942. When antiaircraft units were split from coast artillery in May 1943, the regiment was reorganized and became the 197th Antiaircraft Artillery Group, including the 744th (Gun) and 210th (Automatic Weapons) Antiaircraft Artillery Battalions and the 237th Antiaircraft Artillery (Searchlight) Battalion. These units provided air defense during the island-hopping campaigns in the South West Pacific theatre from 1942 to 1944 and the Philippines campaign in 1944 and 1945. The 172nd Field Artillery Regiment remained stateside until it was broken up in 1943 and eventually formed the XVI Corps Artillery headquarters, 172nd Field Artillery Battalion and 941st Field Artillery Battalion. The latter two battalions served with V Corps artillery with in France and Germany. Back in New Hampshire, the New Hampshire State Guard was reactivated in 1941 to fill the state responsibilities of the National Guard in 1941.

The 195th Infantry Regiment, as a Regimental Combat Team, was allocated to the New Hampshire National Guard after the war as its primary combat unit and organized throughout 1947 and 1948. Outside of the 195th RCT, the postwar NH ARNG also included the 210th and 744th Antiaircraft Artillery Gun Battalions under the 197th Antiaircraft Artillery Group. The 197th Antiaircraft Artillery Group headquarters was mobilized for federal service from 1950 to 1952 during the Korean War, fulfilling training responsibilities at Camp Stewart. The Guard was expanded with the addition of the 237th Military Police Battalion in 1950.

The NH ARNG restructured as a pure artillery force in 1954 with the breakup of the 195th Infantry Regiment, in which it and pre-existing military police and engineer company were converted into artillery units. The new force structure consisted of the 172nd Field Artillery Group with 105 mm self-propelled howitzers and the 148th Field Artillery Group with 8-inch self-propelled howitzers. The 172nd Field Artillery Group included the 172nd Field Artillery Battalion, the former artillery unit of the 195th RCT, and the 737th and 941st Armored Field Artillery Battalions. The 148th Field Artillery Group included the 421st and 574th Field Artillery Battalions.

By 1958, the New Hampshire Army National Guard had a total strength of 3,700 men, with 3,000 in the field artillery groups and 700 in the anti-aircraft group.

During the Vietnam War (1965-1973), the 3-197 Field Artillery (FA, "New Hampshire's Finest") served in Ap Phu Loi, South Vietnam, providing FA Forward Observer Teams and Artillery Liaison Teams in the II Field Force Area.

The 197th Field Artillery Group was reorganized as the 197th Field Artillery Brigade in 1978.

In 1991, the 744 Transportation Company (TC) was deployed to Saudi Arabia, Kuwait, and Iraq during the Gulf War. The 744 TC, 6th Transportation Battalion, 2nd Corps Support Command- 2nd COSCOM, VII Corps, US Army, was awarded the U.S. Army Meritorious Unit Commendation for their service in the Gulf War. Captain Timothy Ainsworth was the 744 T.C. Commander.

In 1995 the New Hampshire Army National Guard deployed to Bosnia to support Operation Joint Endeavor. In 1999 they deployed to the Central American republic of Honduras.

From 2004 to 2005, the 744 T.C. ran missions out of LSA Anaconda, Balad, Iraq, during the Iraq War. Sergeant Jeremiah Holmes was killed in action caused by a powerful enemy improvised explosive device (IED) on a bridge, south of LSA Anaconda in Habbiniyah, Anbar Province, Iraq on March 29, 2004. Captain Mary Bergner was the 744 T.C. Commander. The 2nd Battalion 197th Artillery deployed in 2004–2005 to Iraq, serving as an MP unit, in the cities of Tikrit, Mosul, and Baqubah. SPC Allan J. Burgess was killed in action by a large VBIED (Vehicle Born Improvised Explosive Device) in the city of Mosul on October 15, 2004. The newly formed 237th MP CO deployed roughly 40 soldiers from 2007 to 2008 where they augment the NC 1159th MP CO in mentoring the Iraqi Police. Sergeant David Stelmat was killed in action along with four members of the NC national guard (in separate incidents). The 197th Field Artillery (FA) Brigade was ordered again into active Federal service on September 11, 2010, at Manchester. This time, they were deployed in Kuwait for Operation New Dawn. They were released from active Federal service October 15, 2011 and reverted to state control. During the 2010-2011 Kuwait Deployment for the 197 Fires Brigade (FIB) Chain of command was Commander- Colonel (Col) Peter Corey, Deputy Commander- Lieutenant Colonel (LTC) Mark W. Leahey, Executive Officer (XO)- LTC Daniel T. Wilson, and 197 FIB Command Sergeant Major (CSM) was CSM Thomas Considine. The New Hampshire units involved were Headquarters and Headquarters Battery (HHB), 3-197th FA, 3643rd BSB, and 372nd Signal Company.

The 237th MP Co deployed to Afghanistan in 2013 in support of Operation Enduring Freedom. There they provided base security and customs support to multiple locations throughout the country.

The 744th T.C. was later renamed the 744th Forward Support Company (FSC), and its garrison is located in Hillsborough, New Hampshire.

== Organization ==
As of February 2026 the New Hampshire Army National Guard consists of the following units:

- Joint Force Headquarters-New Hampshire, Army Element, in Concord
  - Headquarters and Headquarters Company, Joint Force Headquarters-New Hampshire, Army Element, in Concord
  - New Hampshire Recruiting & Retention Battalion, in Concord
    - Detachment 1, New Hampshire Recruiting & Retention Battalion, in Center Strafford
  - New Hampshire Medical Detachment, in Concord
  - Garrison Training Center, in Center Strafford
  - 913th Judge Advocate General Trial Defense Team, in Concord
  - Army Aviation Support Facility #1, at Concord Airport
  - Combined Support Maintenance Shop #1, in Concord
  - Field Maintenance Shop #1, in Littleton
  - Field Maintenance Shop #2, in Hooksett
  - 54th Troop Command, in Pembroke
    - Headquarters and Headquarters Company, 54th Troop Command, in Pembroke
    - 12th Civil Support Team (WMD), in Concord
    - 39th Army Band, in Manchester
    - Detachment 1 (Critical Infrastructure Team), 136th Cyber Security Company, 126th Cyber Battalion, in Pembroke (part of 91st Cyber Brigade)
    - 114th Public Affairs Detachment, in Concord
    - 1986th Support Detachment (Contracting Team), in Pembroke
    - 941st Military Police Battalion, in Concord
      - Headquarters and Headquarters Detachment, 941st Military Police Battalion, in Concord
      - Detachment 1, 160th Engineer Company (Vertical Construction Company), in Center Strafford
      - Company C, 3rd Battalion, 172nd Infantry Regiment (Mountain), in Milford (part of 86th Infantry Brigade Combat Team (Mountain))
        - Detachment 2, Headquarters and Headquarters Company, 3rd Battalion, 172nd Infantry Regiment (Mountain), in Milford
        - Detachment 2, Company G (Forward Support), 186th Brigade Support Battalion, in Milford
      - 237th Military Police Company (Combat Support), in Pembroke
        - Detachment 1, 237th Military Police Company (Combat Support), in Lebanon
    - Army Aviation, at Concord Airport
      - Company A (CAC), 1st Battalion (General Support Aviation), 169th Aviation Regiment, at Concord Airport (UH-60L Black Hawk)
        - Detachment 4, Headquarters and Headquarters Company, 1st Battalion (General Support Aviation), 169th Aviation Regiment, at Concord Airport
        - Detachment 1, Company D (AVUM), 1st Battalion (General Support Aviation), 169th Aviation Regiment, at Concord Airport
        - Detachment 1, Company E (Forward Support), 1st Battalion (General Support Aviation), 169th Aviation Regiment, at Concord Airport
      - Company C (MEDEVAC), 3rd Battalion (General Support Aviation), 238th Aviation Regiment, at Concord Airport (HH-60M Black Hawk)
        - Detachment 3, Company D (AVUM), 3rd Battalion (General Support Aviation), 238th Aviation Regiment, at Concord Airport
        - Detachment 3, Company E (Forward Support), 3rd Battalion (General Support Aviation), 238th Aviation Regiment, at Concord Airport
      - Detachment 18, Operational Support Airlift Activity, at Concord Airport (C-12 Huron)
    - 195th Regiment, Regional Training Institute, in Pembroke
      - Multi-Function Training Company, in Pembroke
      - Officer Candidate School Company, in Pembroke
      - Regional Training Site-Maintenance & Ordnance Training Battalion
  - 197th Field Artillery Brigade, in Manchester
    - Headquarters and Headquarters Battery, 197th Field Artillery Brigade, in Manchester
    - 603rd Public Affairs Detachment, in Concord
    - 1st Battalion, 103rd Field Artillery Regiment, in Providence (RI) (M777A2) — (Rhode Island Army National Guard)
      - Battery C, 1st Battalion, 103rd Field Artillery Regiment, in Lebanon
      - Detachment 1, 1207th Forward Support Company, in Lebanon
    - 1st Battalion, 182nd Field Artillery Regiment, in Detroit (MI) (M142 HIMARS) — (Michigan Army National Guard)
    - 3rd Battalion, 197th Field Artillery Regiment, in Plymouth (M142 HIMARS)
      - Headquarters and Headquarters Battery, 3rd Battalion, 197th Field Artillery Regiment, in Plymouth
        - Detachment 1, Headquarters and Headquarters Battery, 3rd Battalion, 197th Field Artillery Regiment, in Franklin
      - Battery A, 3rd Battalion, 197th Field Artillery Regiment, in Littleton
      - Battery B, 3rd Battalion, 197th Field Artillery Regiment, in Nashua
      - 744th Forward Support Company, in Hillsborough
    - 1st Battalion, 201st Field Artillery Regiment, in Fairmont (WV) (M109A6 Paladin) — (West Virginia Army National Guard)
    - 3643rd Brigade Support Battalion, in Portsmouth
      - Headquarters Support Company, 3643rd Brigade Support Battalion, in Portsmouth
        - Detachment 1, Headquarters Support Company, 3643rd Brigade Support Battalion, in Manchester
      - 372nd Signal Company, in Manchester

Aviation unit abbreviations: CAC — Command Aviation Company; MEDEVAC — Medical evacuation; AVUM — Aviation Unit Maintenance

== Historic units ==
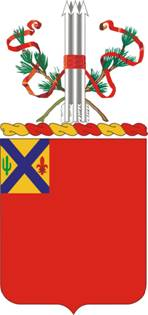
- 172nd Field Artillery Regiment
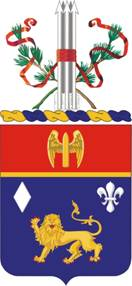
- 197th Coast Artillery Regiment (AA)
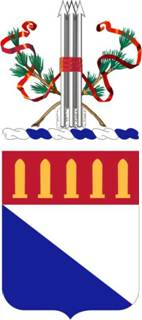
- 195th Infantry Regiment

== See also ==
- List of armored and cavalry regiments of the United States Army
- New Hampshire State Guard
- The War Tapes
