= New Hampshire Air National Guard =

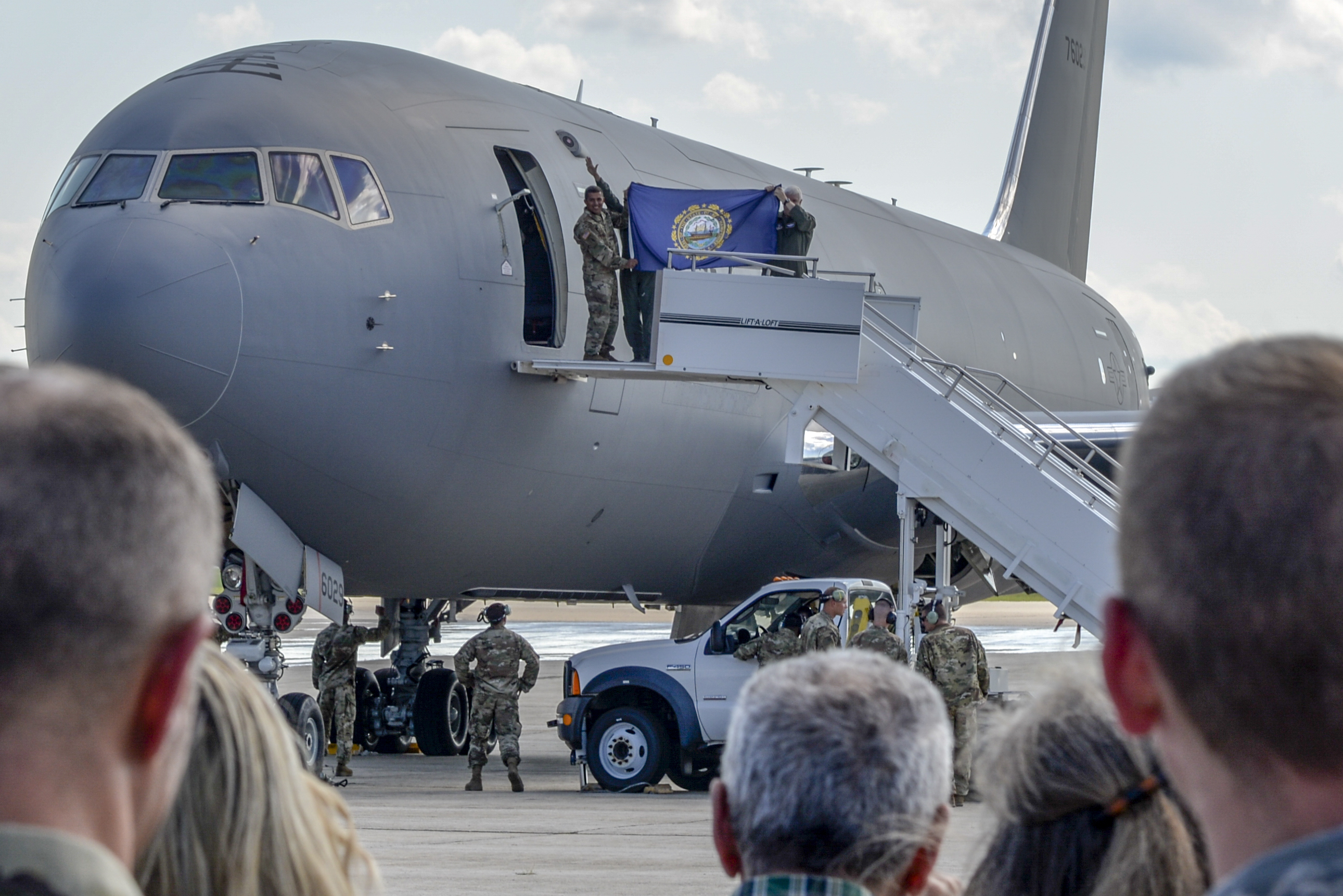
- A Boeing KC-46A Pegasus of the 133d Air Refueling Squadron at Pease ANGB. The 133d is the oldest unit in the NH ANG, having over 70 years of service to the state and nation.
- Active: 4 April 1947 – present
- Country: United States
- Allegiance: New Hampshire
- Branch: Air National Guard
- Type: State militia, military reserve force
- Role: "To meet state and federal mission responsibilities."
- Part of: New Hampshire National Guard; United States National Guard Bureau
- Garrison/HQ: Portsmouth, New Hampshire

Commanders
- Civilian leadership: President Donald Trump (Commander-in-Chief); Troy Meink (Secretary of the Air Force); Governor Kelly Ayotte (Governor of the State of New Hampshire)
- Military leadership: Major General David J. Mikolaities (NHNG Adjutant General) vacant (Commander, NH ANG); CMSgt Pranav Zaveri (State Command Chief Master Sergeant)

Insignia
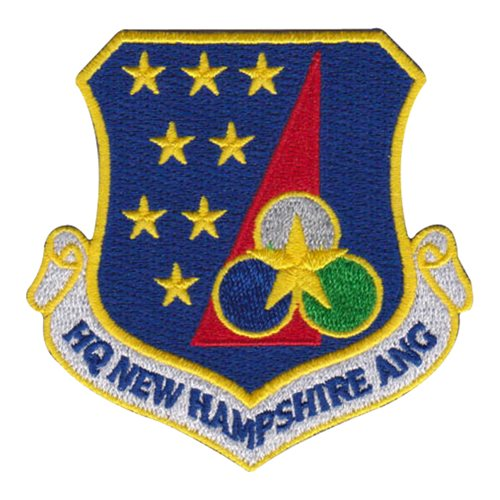
- Emblem of the New Hampshire Air National Guard

Aircraft flown
- Tanker: KC-46A Pegasus

The New Hampshire Air National Guard (NH ANG) is the aerial militia of the U.S. state of New Hampshire. It is a reserve of the United States Air Force and along with the New Hampshire Army National Guard, an element of the New Hampshire National Guard of the larger United States National Guard Bureau.

As state militia units, the units in the NH ANG are not in the normal United States Air Force chain of command. They are under the jurisdiction of the governor of New Hampshire through the office of the Adjutant General of New Hampshire, unless they are federalized by order of the president of the United States. The NH ANG is headquartered in Newington, with a postal address of Portsmouth.

== Overview ==
Under the "Total Force" concept, New Hampshire Air National Guard (NH ANG) units are considered to be Air Reserve Components (ARC) of the United States Air Force (USAF). NH ANG units are trained and equipped by the Air Force and are operationally gained by a major command of the USAF if federalized. In addition, the NH ANG forces are assigned to Air Expeditionary Forces and are subject to deployment tasking orders along with their active duty and Air Force Reserve counterparts in their assigned cycle deployment window.

Along with their federal reserve obligations, as state militia units the elements of the NH ANG are subject to being activated by order of the governor to provide protection of life and property, and preserve peace, order and public safety. State missions include disaster relief in times of earthquakes, hurricanes, floods and forest fires, search and rescue, protection of vital public services, and support to civil defense.

== Components ==
The NH ANG consists of the following major unit:

- 157th Air Refueling Wing

Established 4 April 1947 (as: 133d Fighter Squadron); operates: KC-46A Pegasus
Stationed at: Pease Air National Guard Base, Portsmouth
Gained by: Air Mobility Command
The 157th ARW provides worldwide air refueling support to major commands of the United States Air Force, as well as other U.S. military forces and the military forces of allied nations flying the KC-46A Pegasus.

- The 64th Air Refueling Squadron is a part of the 22nd Operations Group, McConnell Air Force Base, but is operationally assigned to the 157th Air Refueling Wing. The partnership was formed as part of the Active Associate concept where Active Duty Airmen are assigned to an ANG unit.

== History ==
On 24 May 1946, the United States Army Air Forces, in response to dramatic postwar military budget cuts imposed by President Harry S. Truman, allocated inactive unit designations to the National Guard Bureau for the formation of an Air Force National Guard. These unit designations were allotted and transferred to various State National Guard bureaus to provide them unit designations to re-establish them as Air National Guard units.

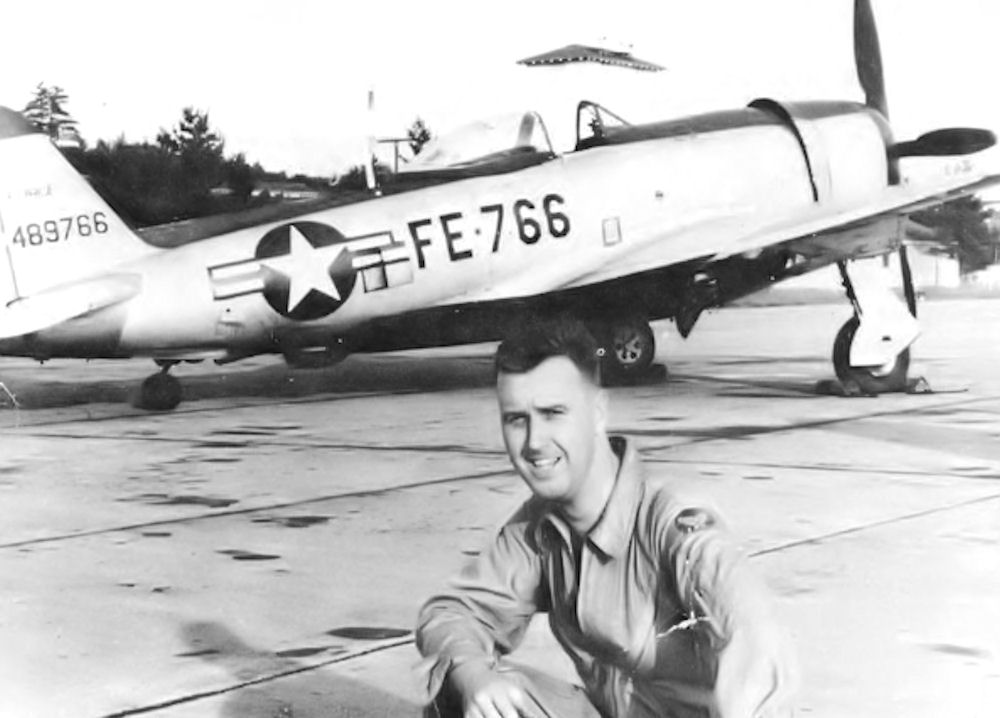
A Republic F-47D Thunderbolt of the 133d Fighter Squadron, the first aircraft assigned to the NH ANG

The NH ANG origins date to the formation of the 133d Fighter Squadron at Grenier Field, Manchester, receiving federal recognition on 4 April 1947. It was equipped with F-47D Thunderbolts and its mission was the air defense of the state. 18 September 1947, however, is considered the official birth of the NH ANG, concurrent with the establishment of the United States Air Force as a separate branch of the United States military under the National Security Act.

On 25 June 1950, the NH ANG was federalized and placed on active duty. The 133d was federalized on 10 February 1951 and assigned to the federalized Maine ANG 101st Fighter-Interceptor Wing, although it initially remained stationed at Grenier AFB, mostly flying gunnery practice missions. Its mission was expanded to include the air defense of New England, although a majority of officers and a substantial number of airmen saw duty overseas in different theaters of operations including Korean combat missions. The squadron was then attached to the Air Defense Command 23d Fighter-Interceptor Wing at Presque Isle AFB in Maine on 1 April 1951 with no change of mission. It was reassigned to the 4711th Defense Wing on 6 February 1952 at Presque Isle AFB. It was released from active duty and returned to the control of the State of New Hampshire on 1 November 1952.

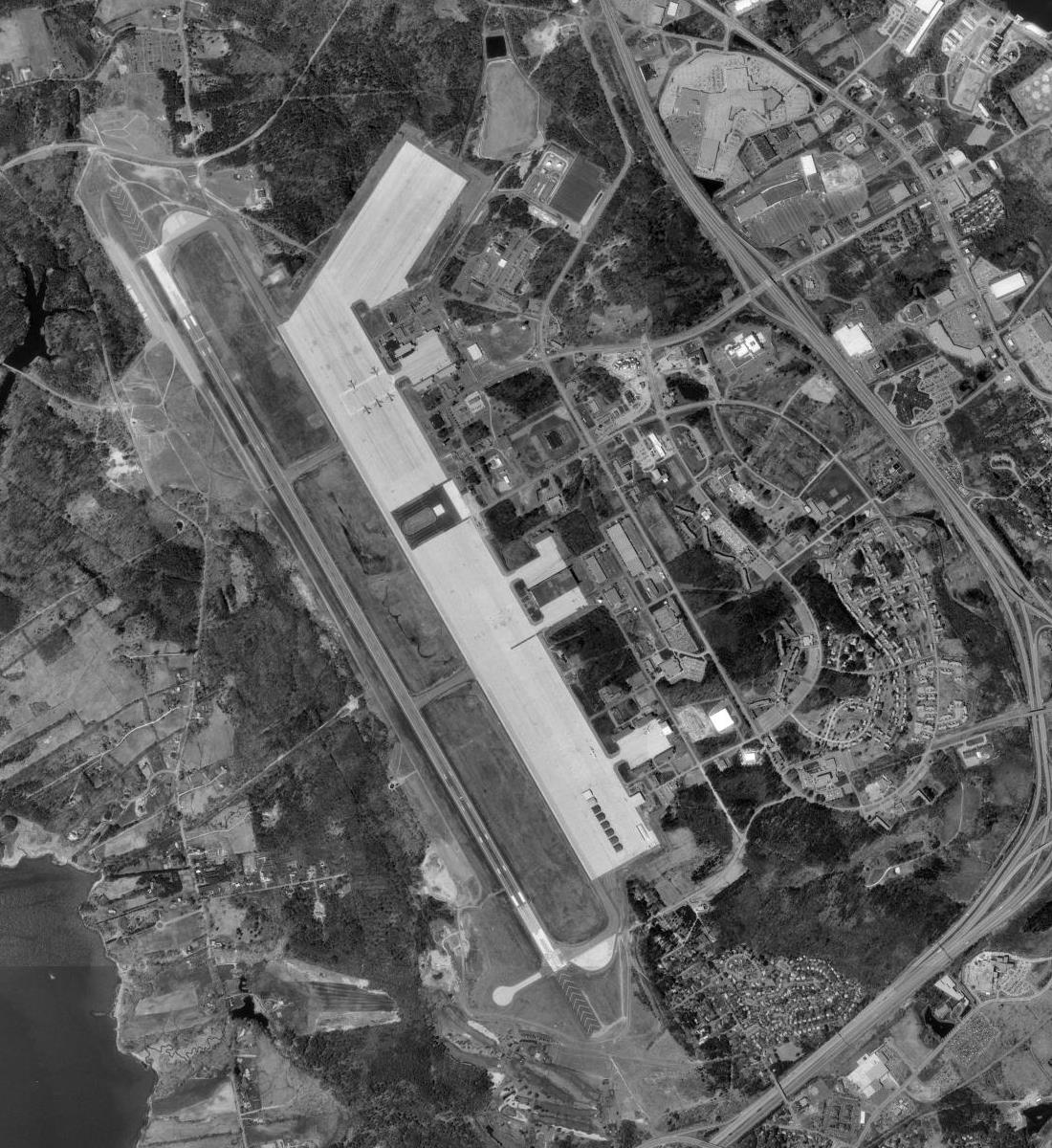
Pease and surrounding area in 1998

In 1960, the mission of the NH ANG changed to air transport in time for their participation in the Berlin Crisis of 1961. This is also when they received their present 157th designation. In the mid-1960s, the 157th moved to Pease Air Force Base, from which they also began flying logistical support to U.S. troops in Vietnam. In 1974, the NH ANG received its current mission as in-flight refuelers.

Within hours of the September 11 attacks in 2001, the NH ANG began refueling the fighter jets that patrolled the airspace over major U.S. cities. Flight crews, aircraft maintenance personnel, communications technicians, air controllers and air security personnel were engaged in Operation Noble Eagle air defense overflights of major United States cities. The 157th was later deployed overseas in support of the war on terror, and NH ANG units were deployed as part of Operation Enduring Freedom in Afghanistan and Operation Iraqi Freedom in Iraq, as well as other locations as directed. The New Hampshire National Guard responded to Operation Iraqi Freedom in what was the largest call up of New Hampshire troops since World War II. Over half of New Hampshire's soldiers and airmen served overseas, conducting various security and infantry missions, providing medical care, building schools, and fostering international relations. The 157th refueled planes further forward in the conflict than at any other time in their history.

On 8 July 2024, the commanding officer of the NH ANG, Brigadier General John Pogorek, was killed in a hit and run accident on Crown Point Road in Rochester, New Hampshire.

== See also ==
- New Hampshire State Guard
- New Hampshire Wing Civil Air Patrol
