= Pease Air National Guard Base =

New Hampshire Air National Guard base

- Portsmouth, New Hampshire in the United States
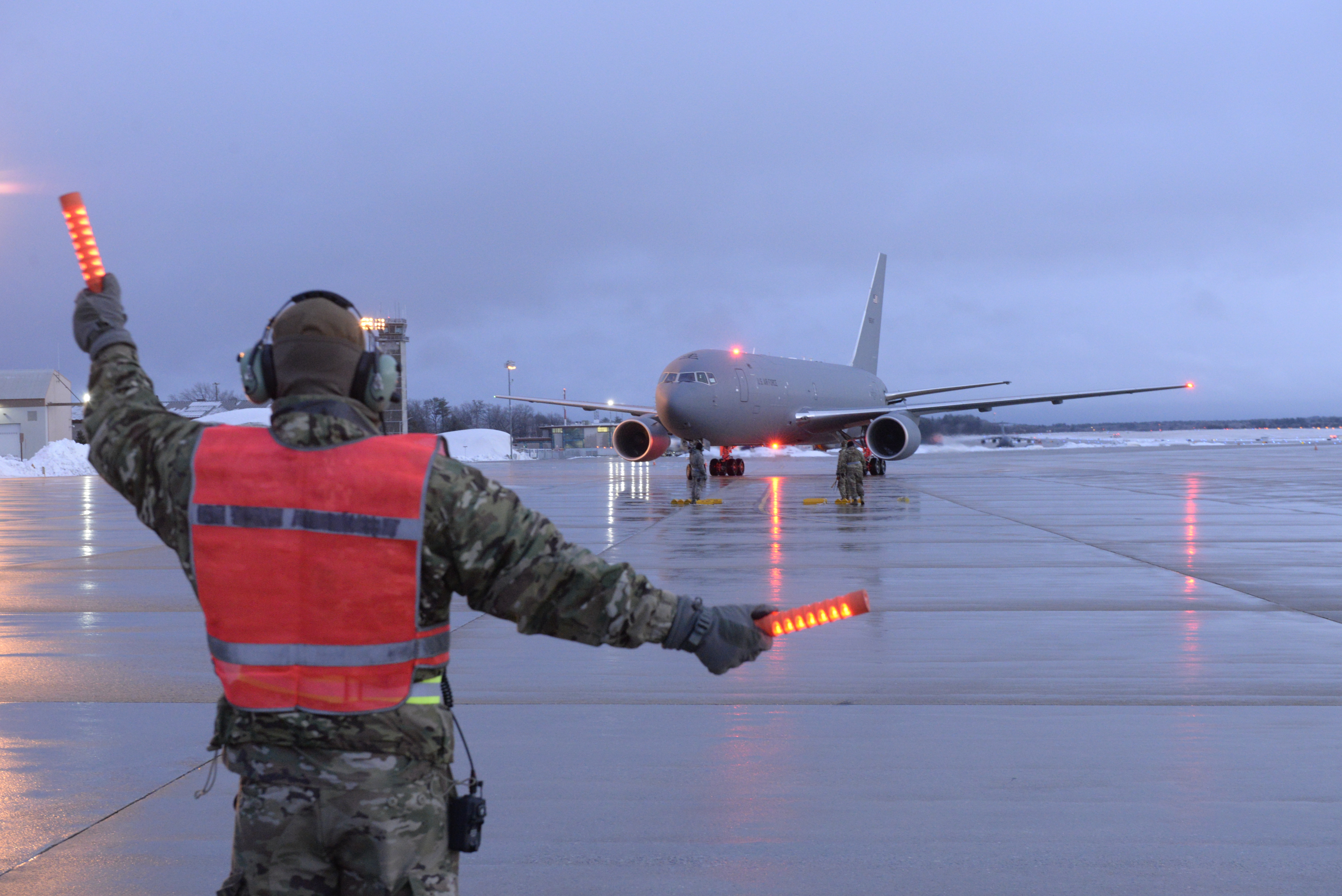
- An airman marshalling a 157th Air Refueling Wing KC-46A Pegasus at Pease ANGB in February 2020

Site information
- Type: Air National Guard base
- Owner: Department of Defense
- Operator: US Air Force (USAF)
- Controlled by: New Hampshire Air National Guard
- Condition: Operational
- Website: www.157arw.ang.af.mil

Location
- Location in the United States
- Coordinates: 43°04′41″N 070°49′24″W

Site history
- Built: 1930s (as Portsmouth Municipal Airport)
- In use: 1951 – present

Garrison information
- Garrison: 157th Air Refueling Wing

Airfield information
- Identifiers: IATA: PSM, ICAO: KPSM, FAA LID: PSM, WMO: 726055
- Elevation: 30.4 metres (100 ft) AMSL
Runways
Direction	Length and surface
16/34	3,450.9 metres (11,322 ft) Asphalt/Concrete
- Airfield shared with Portsmouth International Airport at Pease. Source: Federal Aviation Administration

Pease Air National Guard Base is a New Hampshire Air National Guard base located at Portsmouth International Airport at Pease in New Hampshire. It occupies a portion of what was once Pease Air Force Base, a former Strategic Air Command facility with a base-related population of 10,000 and which was home to the 509th Bomb Wing (509 BW) flying the General Dynamics FB-111A.

Pease AFB was closed pursuant to 1991 Base Realignment and Closure Commission action, with the 509 BW transferring to Whiteman AFB, Missouri. In 1983, investigations had shown soil and water contamination with degreasers and JP-4 jet fuel, and in 1990 the base was put on the National Priorities List of superfund sites. As of 2015, after 25 years of the Pease Development Authority's work, Pease International Tradeport has 275 businesses employing close to 10,000 civilian workers.

Pease continues to be home to the New Hampshire Air National Guard's 157th Air Refueling Wing (157 ARW), an Air Mobility Command gained Air National Guard unit, and since 2009 the 64th Air Refueling Squadron, an active duty United States Air Force "associate" unit to the 157th. The 157 ARW was a former tenant activity at Pease AFB and remained at the installation following the BRAC-directed closure of its regular Air Force activities. As of 2011, the base population is 380 full-time military personnel, with a monthly surge of up to 950 when part-time military personnel are included.

== Location ==
Pease Air Force Base occupied 4,100 acres (1,700 ha) of land in total, with roughly 40 percent in the city of Portsmouth and 60 percent in the town of Newington, plus a small amount of golf course acreage in Greenland, all within Rockingham County in the Seacoast Region of New Hampshire. Pease Air National Guard Base is approximately 220 acres (89 ha) in size, and as of September 2014 included 46 structures. It is located approximately 50 miles (80 km) from Manchester, Portland, and Boston — major cities of New Hampshire, Maine, and Massachusetts, respectively.

== History ==
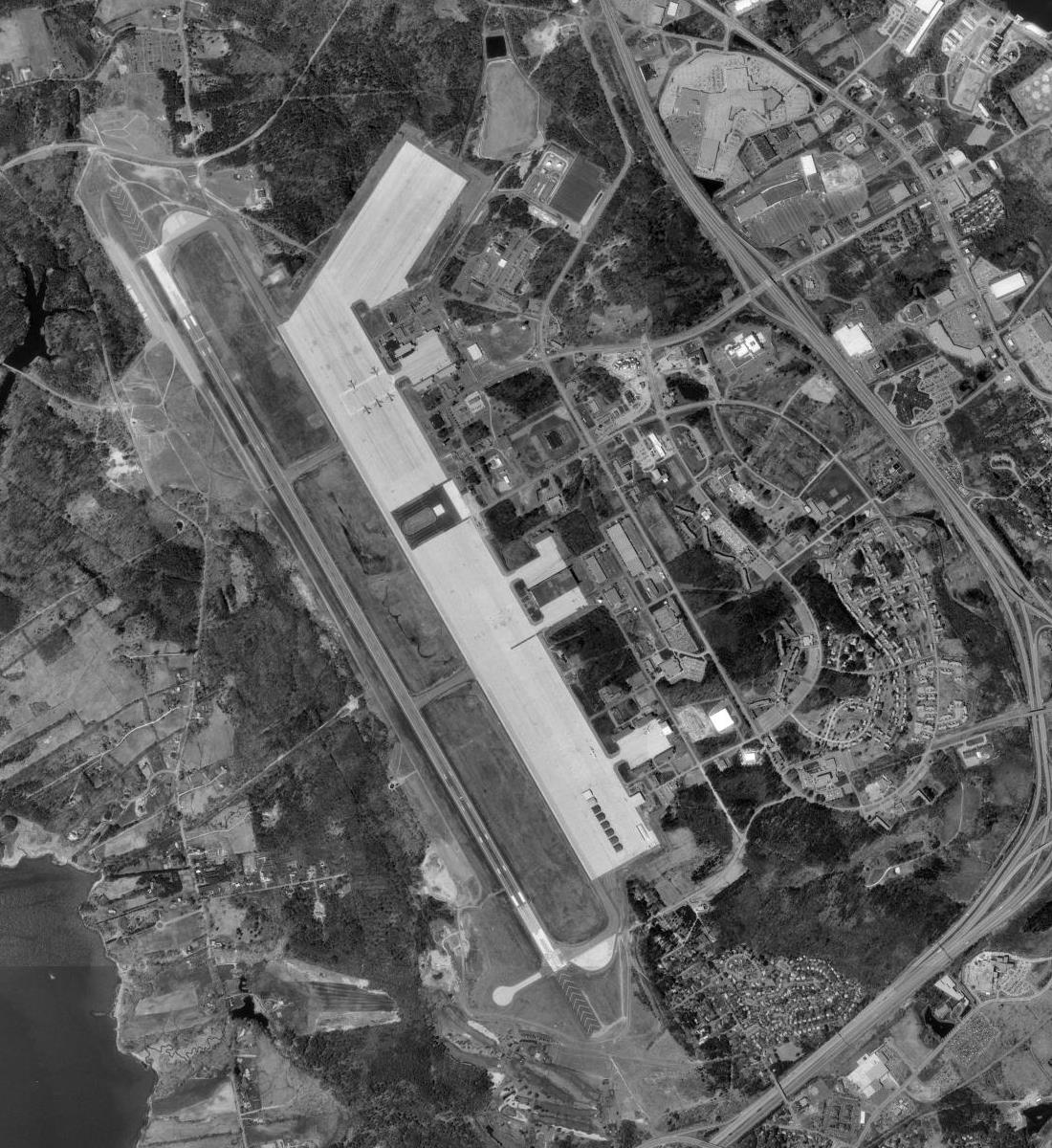
Pease and surrounding area in 1998

What would become Pease Air Force Base started as the 300-acre (120 ha) Portsmouth Municipal Airport in the 1930s. With the onset of World War II, improvements to the airport were announced in December 1941. The airport was closed to civilian traffic effective August 1942, as part of defense measures along the east coast. Civil Air Patrol usage started in February 1944, and in August the airport was leased to the U.S. Navy, who already had a nearby presence at Portsmouth Naval Shipyard.

The U.S. Air Force assumed control of the airport in 1951, when the installation was selected for development as a Strategic Air Command (SAC) base. Purchase of additional land for expansion of the base started in 1952 and was completed in 1956. Ground breaking for the new SAC facilities took place in 1954, and the first B-47 Stratojet bombers arrived in 1956. Renamed Portsmouth Air Force Base, the installation formally opened on 30 June 1956. On 7 September 1957, it was renamed Pease Air Force Base in honor of New Hampshire native Captain Harl Pease Jr., USAAC, who was posthumously awarded the Medal of Honor for heroism during World War II.

Pease AFB was the home of the 100th Bombardment Wing and from 1958 onward the 509th Bombardment Wing, the latter arriving from Walker AFB, New Mexico, as successor to the famed 509th Composite Group of World War II that had executed the atomic bombings of Hiroshima and Nagasaki and had transitioned to the B-47 and KC-97 in the mid-1950s. Their mission was strategic warfare in the event of war. From 1956 until its closure in 1991, Pease Air Force Base maintained a combat-ready force for long-range bombardment and nuclear strikes. B-47 Stratojet, B-52 Stratofortress, and FB-111 Aardvark bomber aircraft, as well as KC-97 Stratofreighter and KC-135 Stratotanker air refueling aircraft and C-97 Stratofreighter, C-124 Globemaster and C-130 Hercules cargo aircraft, were all based at Pease AFB at varying times. In 1961 and 1962, the base received consideration as a potential site for Minuteman missile deployments.

The 100th Bombardment Wing was converted in June 1966 to a strategic reconnaissance wing and transferred to Davis-Monthan AFB, Arizona. This left the 509th Bombardment Wing as the principal host wing for Pease AFB. The 509th was phased down for inactivation in 1965, but, cognizant of the historical significance of the 509th in SAC, the wing converted to the B-52D and KC-135A and was redesignated as the 509th Bombardment Wing, Heavy, in 1966. From 1 April to 1 October 1968 and from 26 March to 20 September 1969, more than one-half of the wing was deployed in Southeast Asia. The 509th supported SAC combat and contingency operations in Southeast Asia with KC–135A aircraft and crews from 1966 to 1975, and with B–52D aircraft and crews from 1966 to 1970. By 1 December 1969, the wing had transferred all its B-52D aircraft to other SAC units in preparation for transition to the General Dynamics FB-111A. Redesignated as the 509th Bombardment Wing, Medium, the 509th had no bomber aircraft from November 1969 until 1970, but continued KC-135 refueling and alert operations and performed FB-111 ground training. The wing resumed flying training with the FB-111 in December 1970 and assumed FB–111 alert commitments from 1 July 1971 until September 1990. During this time, the 509th won the SAC Bombing and Navigation Competition and the Fairchild Trophy in 1979, 1981, 1982, and 1983, and the Sanders Trophy for best air refueling unit in 1982.

In 1966, the New Hampshire Air National Guard relocated the 157th Military Airlift Group (157 MAG) from the deactivating Grenier AFB in nearby Manchester, New Hampshire, to Pease AFB. Operating the C-97 Stratofreighter, the group transitioned to the C-124 Globemaster in 1968 and to the C-130 Hercules in 1971. The mission of the group was changed in 1975 when it was designated as the 157th Air Refueling Group (157 ARG) and transitioned to the KC-135A in 1975. The 157th later transitioned to the KC-135E in 1984, the KC-135R in 1993, and to the KC-46A in 2019.

Pease AFB served as a base conducting summer field training for U.S. Air Force Reserve Officer Training Corps (AFROTC) cadets during the 1960s and '70s.

=== Air Force Base closure ===
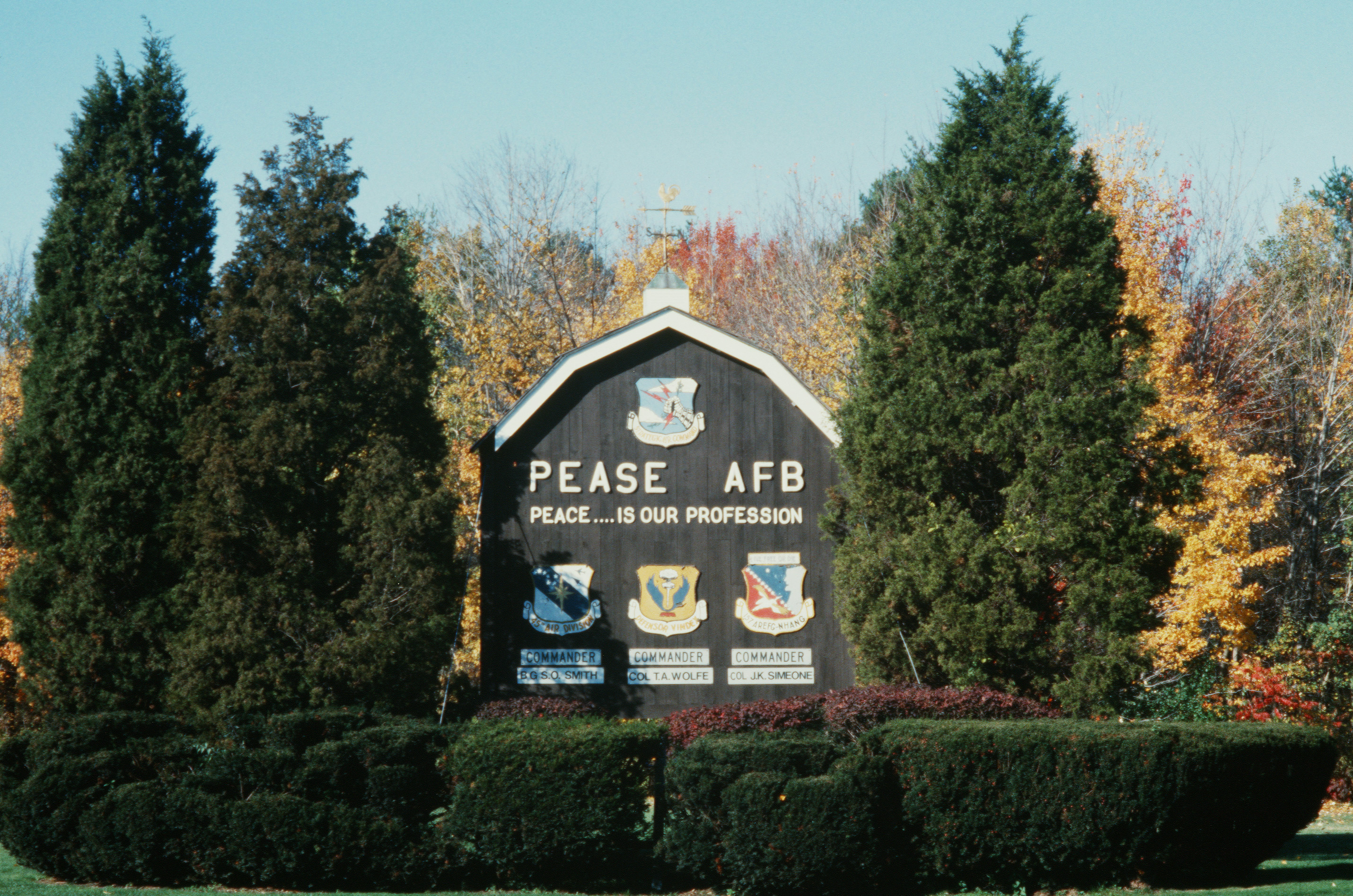
The base sign in 1987

In December 1988, Pease AFB was one of 86 military installations to be closed as part of the Secretary of Defense's Base Realignment and Closure process. In 1989, 3,461 active-duty military, 741 civil service workers and 347 non-appropriated fund employees were employed at Pease AFB. Of the total active duty personnel, 49 were assigned to the Air National Guard. It is estimated that the base created a total of 2,466 secondary jobs within the local communities. Military personnel began leaving the base in June 1990, and Pease AFB officially closed on 31 March 1991.

The 509th BW transferred its FB-111 aircraft to Tactical Air Command and its KC-135s to other SAC units. The wing was then administratively moved to Whiteman AFB Missouri in September 1990, but not manned until April 1993.

Four historical aircraft on static display near the main gate were disassembled and moved to other locations; Ellsworth AFB in South Dakota received a B-47, and Whiteman AFB received a B-29, KC-97, and B-52. The B-29, serial number 44-61671, is on display at Whiteman as a representation of The Great Artiste.

=== Air National Guard Base ===
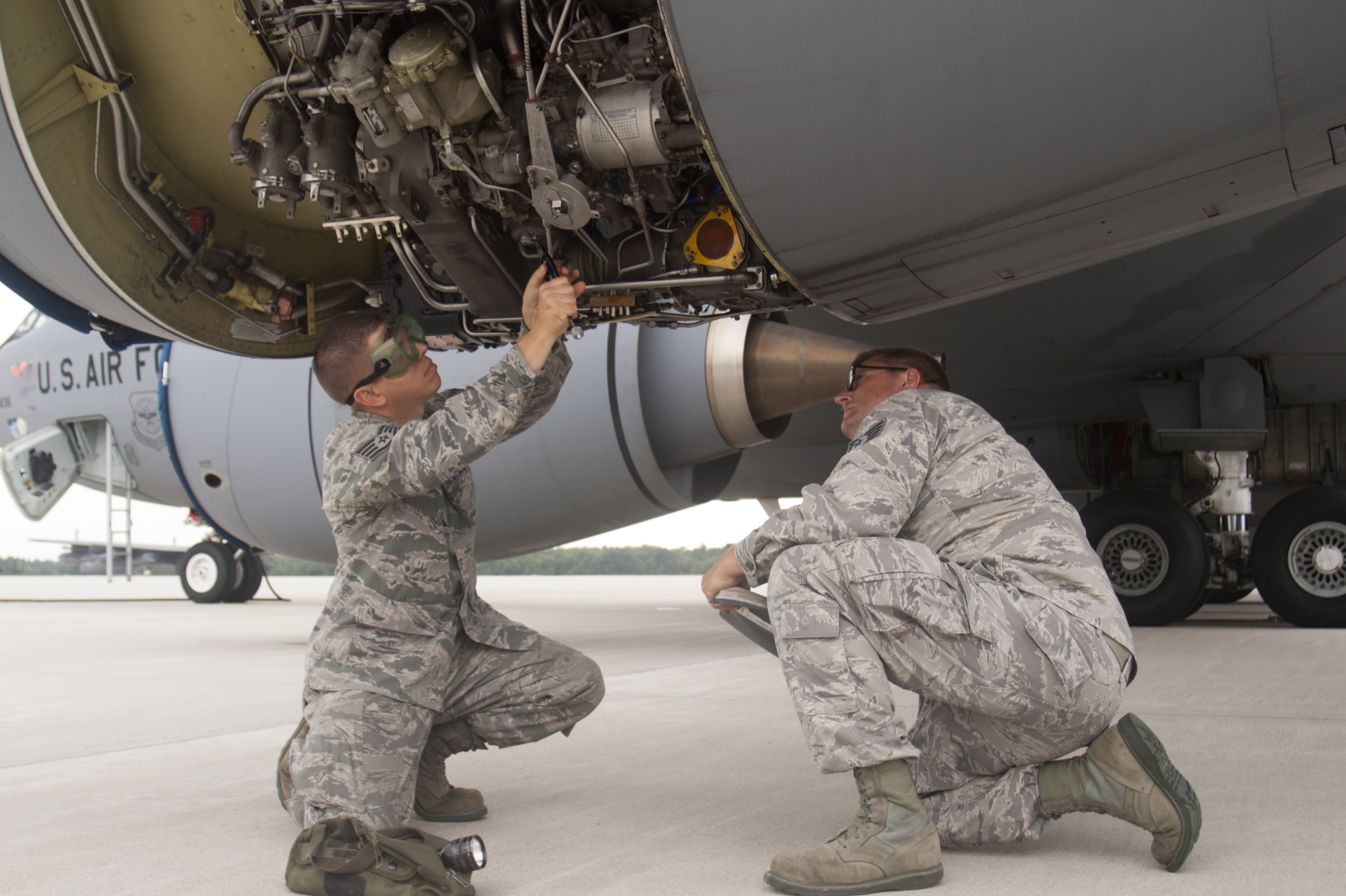
64 ARS and 157 ARW personnel working at Pease in September 2013

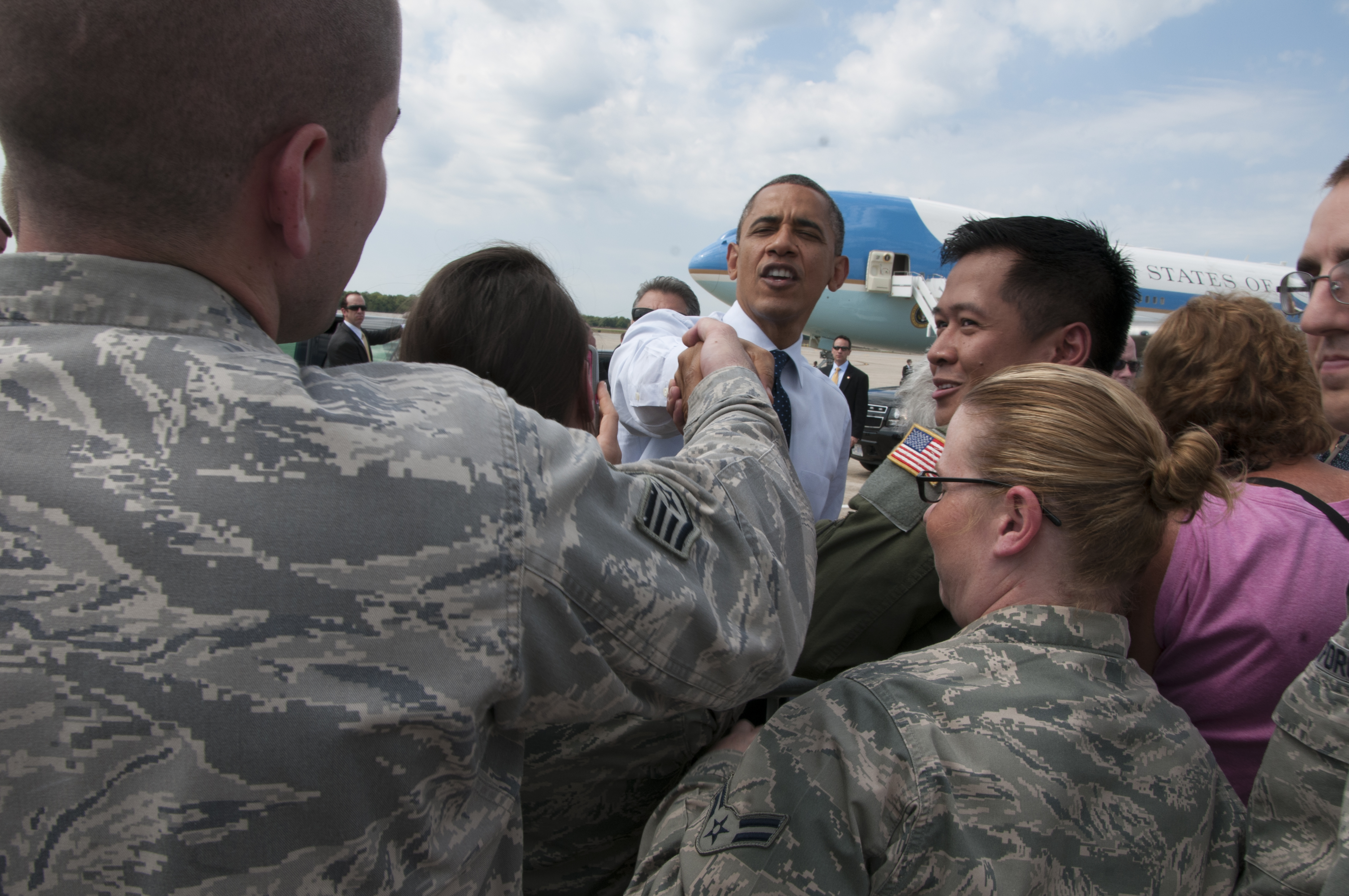
President Barack Obama greeting airmen at Pease in September 2012

The majority of Pease AFB was transferred to the Pease Development Authority, who now operate Pease International Tradeport including Portsmouth International Airport at Pease. The remaining part of the former Pease AFB that remained under military control was transferred to the New Hampshire Air National Guard and renamed Pease Air National Guard Base with the 157 ARG designated as the host unit.

With the introduction of the USAF "objective wing" concept into the Air National Guard in the early 1990s, the 157 ARG was redesignated to its current title as the 157th Air Refueling Wing (157 ARW) on October 16, 1995.

On October 2, 2009, the 64th Air Refueling Squadron (64 ARS) was activated at Pease as the 157th's active-guard associate. This was the first time that an active duty Air Force unit had returned to Pease since 1991.

In August 2014, the Air Force announced that the 157 ARW would become the first Air National Guard unit to equip with the new Boeing KC-46 Pegasus aerial refueling aircraft. The KC-46A was scheduled to enter the Air Force inventory during fiscal year 2016, with Pease ANGB to receive its first Pegasus after October 2017. By the end of 2018, a Weapons System Trainer, Boom Operator Trainer, and Fuselage Trainer for the KC-46A were installed at Pease. In early February 2019, it was announced that the 157 ARW would receive the new aircraft by the fall of 2019.

The final KC-135 at Pease, serial number 57-1419, departed on March 24, 2019, for Goldwater Air National Guard Base in Phoenix, Arizona. The first KC-46A arrived at Pease on August 8, 2019. The 12th and final KC-46A was delivered on February 5, 2021.

=== Incidents/accidents ===
All noted aircraft were based at Pease AFB, unless stated otherwise.

On November 20, 1957, a KC-97 from Dow Air Force Base in Maine made an emergency landing at Pease after its refueling boom could not be retracted; there were no injuries.

On April 15, 1958, a B-47 (serial number 52–0562) from Walker Air Force Base in New Mexico crashed on takeoff at Pease; all four crewmen were killed.

On July 22, 1959, a KC-97 (serial number 52-2703) crashed near Andover, New Hampshire, while on a nighttime training mission; all seven crewmen were killed.

On January 4, 1961, a B-47 (serial number 53-4244) crashed on takeoff at Pease; all four crewmen were killed.

On August 3, 1962, a B-47 (serial number 52-0526) crashed on takeoff at Pease; all three crewmen were killed.

On November 5, 1964, a KC-97 crashed on takeoff at Pease; all five crewmen were killed. Some of the wreckage was scattered across nearby New Hampshire Route 101, which is now New Hampshire Route 33.

On December 8, 1964, a B-47 (serial number 52-0339) crashed in Newington shortly after takeoff; all four crewmen were killed.

On February 26, 1965, a B-47 (serial number 52-0171) returning to Pease from Spain was involved in a mid-air collision while refueling over the Atlantic Ocean with a KC-135 from Dow Air Force Base; the four crewmen on each plane were killed.

On July 21, 1965, a B-47 (serial number 52-0160) was forced to make a belly landing at Pease due to inoperative landing gear; there were no injuries.

On January 30, 1981, an FB-111A (serial number 68-0263) crashed in Portsmouth. Both crewmen successfully ejected, and there were no fatalities on the ground; however, the resulting fires in a housing complex caused $385,000 ($1.36 million in 2025) in damages and left 13 families homeless. The accident was ultimately attributed to "incorrect" actions of the pilot during a stall spin.

On January 11, 1990, a KC-135 (serial number 59-1494) caught fire on the tarmac at Pease during maintenance work—there were no injuries; however, the aircraft was destroyed.

=== Events ===
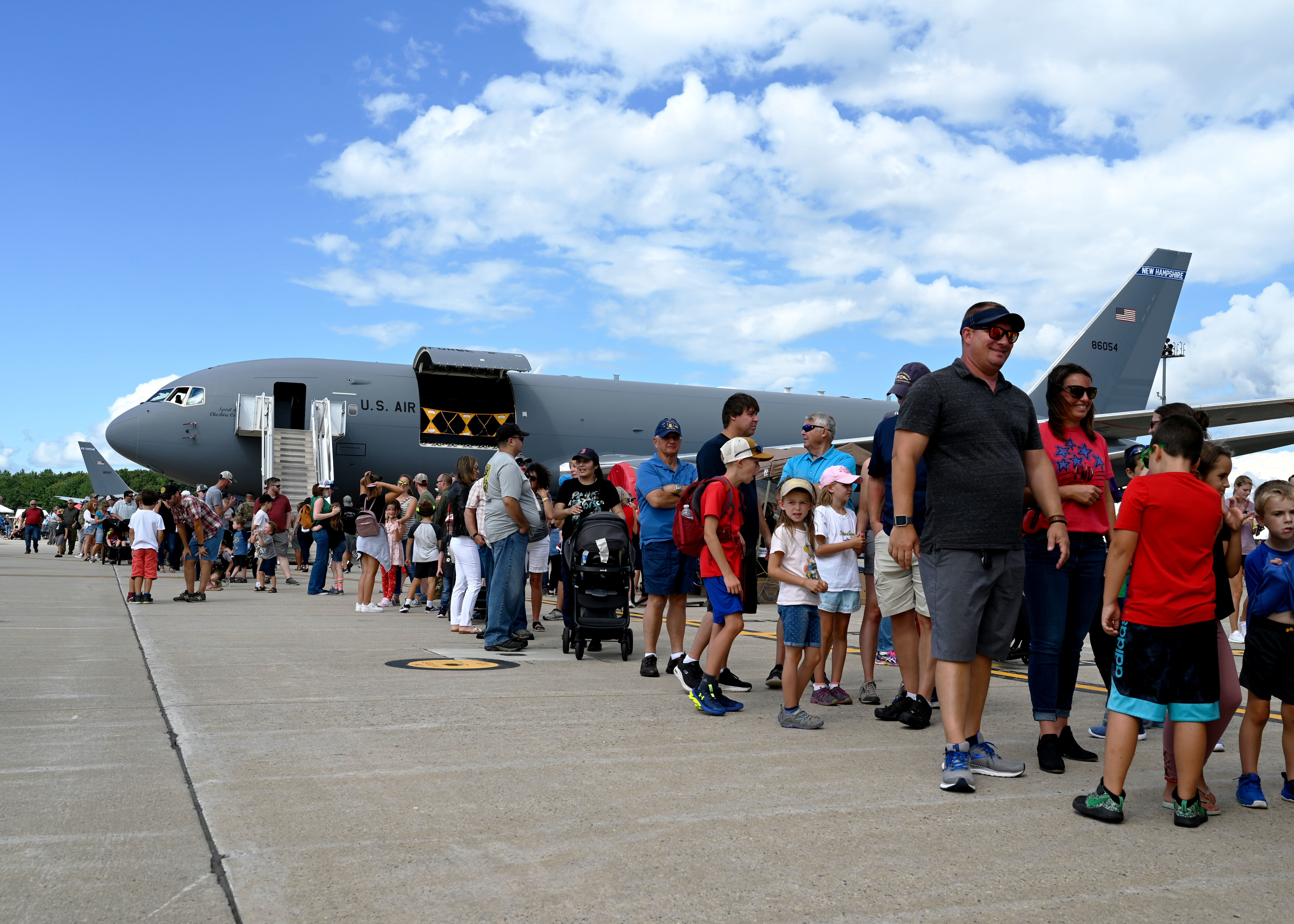
A KC-46A Pegasus during the 2021 air show at Pease ANGB

Prior to its closure as an active base in 1991, frequent air shows were held at Pease, typically featuring either the United States Air Force Thunderbirds or the Blue Angels of the United States Navy. The 1977 show was promoted as being the "21st annual Open House".

Air shows held at Pease AFB include those held in September 1960 with the Thunderbirds, August 1972 with the Thunderbirds, July 1977 with the Thunderbirds, July 1987 with the Thunderbirds, May 1988 with the Blue Angels, September 1989 with the Thunderbirds, and May 1990 with the Blue Angels.

Subsequent air shows have been held infrequently. These include August 2010 with the Blue Angels, August 2011 with the Thunderbirds, June 2012 with the Blue Angels, September 2021 with the Thunderbirds, and September 2023 with the Air Combat Command F-16 Viper Demonstration Team.

The Blue Angels performed in the "Thunder Over New Hampshire Air Show" at Pease on September 6, 2025.

== Environmental issues ==
Aircraft maintenance operations at Pease AFB generated hazardous waste, including spent degreasers, solvents, paint strippers, jet fuels, and others, which contaminated soils and groundwater. Environmental investigations began in 1983 under the Air Force "Restoration Installation Program". In 1990, Pease AFB was placed on the National Priorities List of Superfund sites. The site's contamination is addressed in twelve long-term remedial phases, mainly soil excavation and disposal, vertical containment walls installed in the subsurface and groundwater extraction wells, soil vapor extraction and air sparging to treat petroleum and solvent contamination, and where groundwater extraction and treatment efforts are uncertain (zone 3) improvement thereof and wellhead preparing treatment capability for the Haven water supply well. At two sites a permeable reactive barrier was installed to intercept and destroy the groundwater contamination (sites 49 and 73). The groundwater is monitored long term and its use is restricted.

In June 2014, Portsmouth shut down Haven Well, a water well serving Pease International Tradeport, after Air Force tests showed perfluorooctane sulfonic acid (PFOS) 12.5 times higher than the EPA's Provisional Health Advisory. Perfluorooctanoic acid (PFOA) was also found, but below the health advisory level. The Air Force had tested the well in advance of an EPA requirement beginning in 2015. In 2015, the CDC announced blood testing of 500 people exposed to this contaminant from the Haven Well, thought to stem from the Air Force using firefighting foam.

In July 2015, the preliminary average of the first 98 blood tests was higher than the national average. The EPA ordered the Air Force to "design, install and operate a groundwater treatment system for the Haven well" that will "at a minimum restore contaminated groundwater in the Pease aquifer to levels less than the PHA for PFOA and PFOS" within 420 days or about 14 months. The EPA predicted the contamination to continue to migrate toward the Harrison, Smith, Collins and Portsmouth No. 1 wells, which are known as the "southern well field" at the tradeport. The Air Force used the firefighting foam in 19 other areas, which have not been tested yet. In mid July, the New Hampshire State Department of Health and Human Services announced it was "exploring all measures to reopen testing for anyone exposed to contaminated water" at Haven Well.

Exposed firefighters began filing workers compensation claims with the city, and mothers whose children were exposed to contaminated water at a daycare center and who developed elevated PFOA levels have spoken out. The city of Portsmouth requested the two other wells be treated; in September, the Air Force announced they are “pursuing options” to treat all three city-owned wells. In early 2016, a Community Assistance Panel was formed to help address the contaminated water issues.

== Pease Development Authority ==
In 1990, a majority of the former Pease AFB, other than property retained by the Air National Guard, was transferred to the Pease Development Authority (PDA) for reuse as a civilian airport and commercial center. The PDA was created in response to local economic impact from the base closure; many area residents believe that the recession of the early 1990s affected the region more than the Great Recession of the late 2000s.

The airport opened for civilian use in July 1991, and became an FAA-certified airport for commercial air carrier operation under FAR Part 139 in October 1992.

Pease has a Foreign Trade Zone with access to the East Coast and international trade corridors by land (Interstate 95), by direct air cargo from Pease, or by sea via the Port of New Hampshire in Portsmouth. An international/domestic passenger terminal has Federal Inspection Services including U.S. Customs and Border Protection, agriculture and immigration.

As of 2015, just shy of its 25-year anniversary, nearly 300 economically diverse businesses employing just under 10,000 workers have settled in the Tradeport, and another 4,000 people outside the tradeport support those businesses.

The logo of the Pease Greeters

Wildlife refuge

In 1992, a former weapons storage area in Newington, approximately 1,100 acres (450 ha) with frontage on Great Bay, was turned into a wildlife refuge.

== Pease Greeters ==
The Pease Greeters are a 501(c)(3) tax-exempt, non-profit organization whose members greet troops landing at Pease en route to, or returning from, overseas deployment. Since meeting a flight in 2005, the group has met over 1,500 flights to mid-2018. Staffed primarily with retired veterans and local residents, the group was joined by former President George H. W. Bush in greeting a flight in October 2010.
