= New Hampshire National Guard =

Militia of the U.S. state of New Hampshire

Current emblem of the New Hampshire National Guard

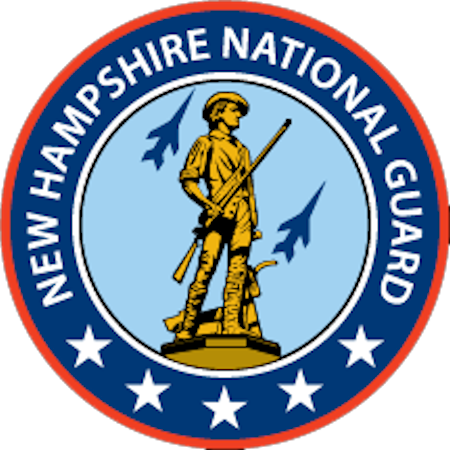
Historic emblem of the New Hampshire National Guard

The New Hampshire National Guard is the militia of the U.S. state of New Hampshire. As a state militia, units in the New Hampshire National Guard are under the jurisdiction of the governor of New Hampshire through the office of the Adjutant General of New Hampshire, unless they are federalized by order of the president of the United States.

As seen on the organization's emblem, a New Hampshire militia dates to 1679, when the Province of New Hampshire was a colony of England and later a British province. The other date on the emblem, 1947, corresponds to when the organization's aerial militia was formed.

The New Hampshire National Guard currently consists of:

- New Hampshire Army National Guard

- Headquartered in Concord

- New Hampshire Air National Guard

- Headquartered in Newington (postal address of Portsmouth)
- 157th Air Refueling Wing

== See also ==
- New Hampshire State Guard
