= 195th Infantry Regiment (United States) =

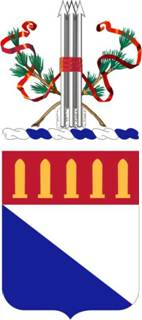
- Coat of Arms of the 195th Infantry Regiment
- Active: 1947–1954
- Country: United States of America
- Allegiance: New Hampshire
- Branch: Army National Guard
- Type: Infantry
- HQ: Manchester, New Hampshire
- Mottos: Take and Hold

Insignia
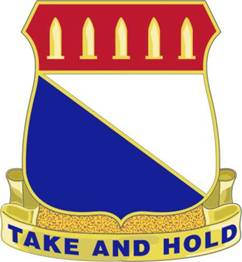
- Distinctive Unit Insignia

The 195th Infantry Regiment was a regiment of the United States Army, part of the New Hampshire Army National Guard.

== History ==
The 195th Infantry Regiment was organized in 1947 and 1948, with the regimental coat of arms being approved on 30 October 1953. The regiment perpetuated the lineage of the 941st Field Artillery Battalion and the 774th Tank Destroyer Battalion that served on the Western Front of World War II, and the previous 172nd Field Artillery Regiment of the New Hampshire National Guard. The 941st had been formed from a battalion of the federalized 172nd Field Artillery Regiment while the 774th incorporated Battery H of the 172nd.

The regiment was broken up on 1 December 1954 when the New Hampshire Army National Guard was restructured, eliminating its infantry units in favor of artillery. The regimental headquarters at Manchester became that of the 172nd Field Artillery Group, while the 2nd Battalion headquarters at Nashua became that of the 148th Field Artillery Group. Companies A, B, C, H, and Service Company at Manchester consolidated to form the 941st Armored Field Artillery Battalion there. The 3rd Battalion headquarters and Companies E (Nashua), F (Milford), G (Peterboro), and I (Keene) became the 574th Field Artillery Battalion headquartered at Keene. The 1st Battalion at Portsmouth and Company D (Somersworth) consolidated with artillery units to form the 737th Field Artillery Battalion. Companies K (Lebanon) and M (Newport), Heavy Mortar Company (Haverhill), and Tank Company (Hillsboro) reorganized with an engineer company into the 421st Field Artillery Battalion. Company L (Littleton) was redesignated Battery D, 210th Antiaircraft Artillery Battalion, and Medical Company (Manchester) was redesignated Battery C, 172nd Field Artillery Battalion.

The heraldry of the 195th was transferred to the New Hampshire National Guard Officer Candidate School on 20 June 1997, which was expanded into the New Hampshire National Guard's RTI as the 195th RTI at Center Strafford. In 2017 the unit moved to a new headquarters in Pembroke, New Hampshire (the Edward Cross Training Complex). The unit provides many courses, including the Consolidated Faculty Development Instructor Course (CFDIC), Officer Candidate School (OCS), and the Quartermaster (92Y) Senior Leader Course.
