= Adjutant General of New Hampshire =

Military official in the U.S. state of New Hampshire

Adjutant General of the State of New Hampshire
- Flag of the State of New Hampshire

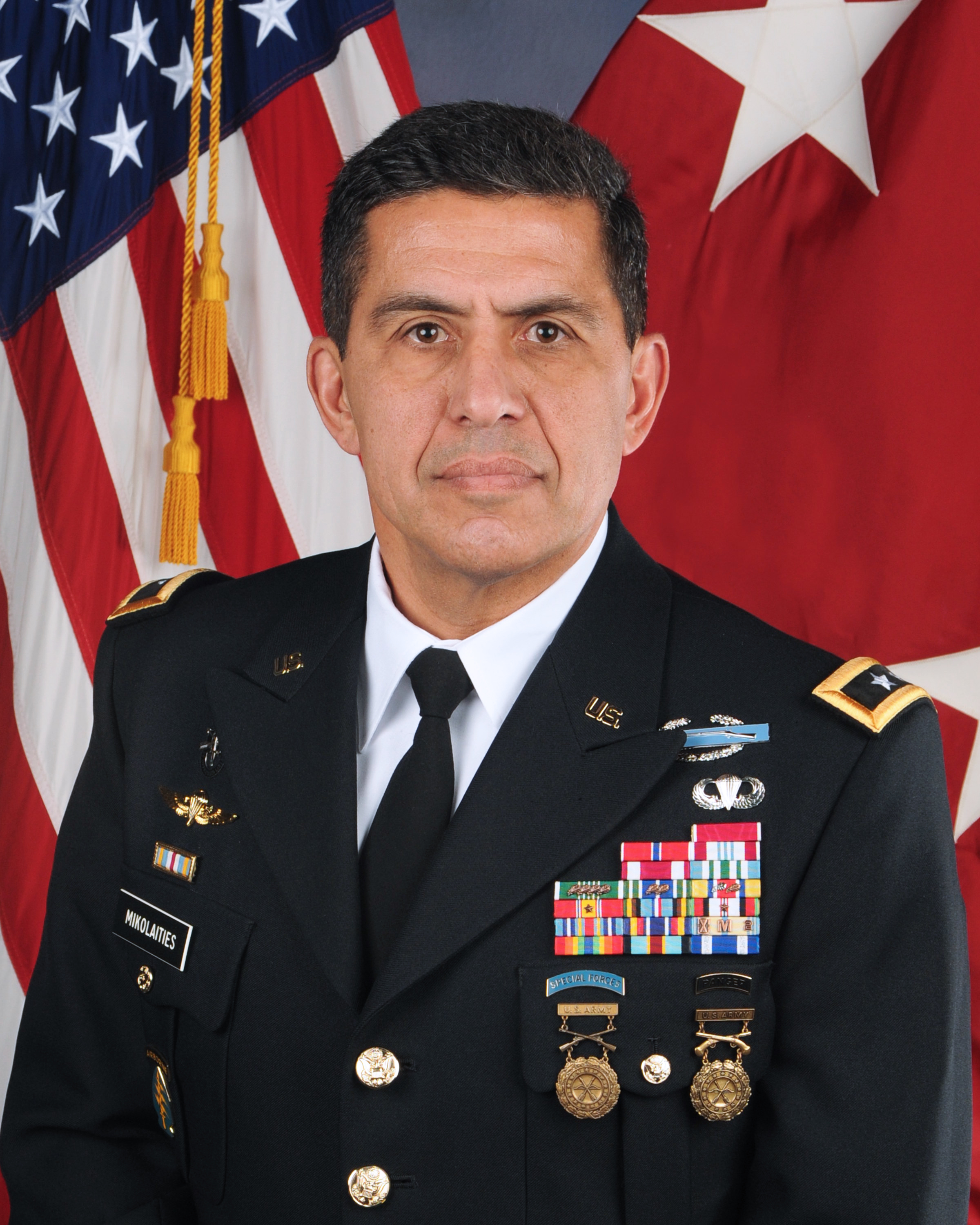
- Incumbent; Major General David J. Mikolaities since September 23, 2017
- Member of: New Hampshire National Guard
- Reports to: Governor of New Hampshire
- Nominator: Governor of New Hampshire
- Website: www.dmavs.nh.gov/about-us

The Adjutant General of New Hampshire is the highest-ranking military official in the U.S. state of New Hampshire and is subordinate to the Governor of New Hampshire.

== Description ==
The state adjutant general of New Hampshire "is responsible for the strategic direction of Army and Air National Guard operations and all aspects of Veterans Services, including the Division of Veterans Services, the Division of Community Based Military Programs as well as the State Veteran’s Cemetery." The state's adjutant general is nominated by the governor, subject to confirmation by the Executive Council of New Hampshire. The officeholder serves as a general-grade officer in the New Hampshire National Guard. Newspaper references to the position date to at least 1824.

New Hampshire also has a Deputy Adjutant General, who "serves as the principal liaison to senior military officials, various state and federal officials, the legislature, local governments, and community groups."

As of 2024, New Hampshire also has two persons holding the title of Assistant Adjutant General—the commander of the New Hampshire Army National Guard and the commander of the New Hampshire Air National Guard.

== Incumbent ==
The current Adjutant General is David J. Mikolaities, who was nominated by Governor Chris Sununu in August 2017, and assumed the position on September 23, 2017, becoming the 26th person to hold the office. Mikolaities was born in Manchester, New Hampshire, and graduated from the United States Military Academy. His military experiences include Operation Iraqi Freedom and Operation Enduring Freedom. At the time of his nomination, Mikolaities held the rank of colonel in the New Hampshire Army National Guard. He was promoted to the rank of brigadier general upon assuming the office, and was subsequently promoted to the rank of major general in June 2019.

The current Deputy Adjutant General is Warren M. Perry, a native of Bangor, Maine, who graduated from the University of Maine and served in the United States Army. Perry has held the position since November 13, 2015.

== Officeholders ==
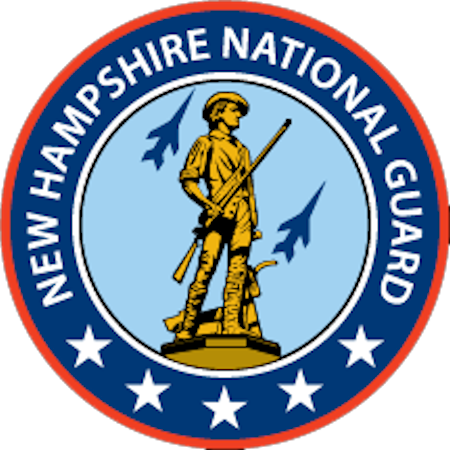
Historic emblem of the New Hampshire National Guard

Herbert E. Tutherly, who held the position in the early 20th century, was the first career military officer to do so. Kenneth R. Clark, who held the position 2004–2009, was the first to come from the Air Force; each of his predecessors who served in the United States Armed Forces came from the Army.

The total number of people who have held the position is unclear. Media reports have referred to William N. Reddel III as the 25th adjutant and David J. Mikolaities as the 26th.

Adjutants General of New Hampshire
Name	Years	Branch	Ref.
Nathaniel Peabody	1777–1779	Militia	
Jeremiah Fogg	1779–1???	Militia	
Michael McClary	1???–1813	Militia	
Benjamin Butler	1813–1820		
Charles H. Peaslee	1839–1847	Civilian	
Joseph Carter Abbott	1855–1861	Civilian	
Anthony Colby	1861–1863	Militia	
Daniel E. Colby	1863–1864		
Nathaniel Head	1864–1870	Militia	
John M. Hawes	187?–1874		
Andrew J. Edgerly	1874–1876	US Vol.	
Ira Cross	1876–187?		
Augustus D. Ayling	1879–1907	US Vol.	
Harry B. Cilley	1907–1911	DCNG	
Herbert E. Tutherly	1911–1915	Army	
Charles W. Howard	1915–1939	NHNG	
Charles F. Bowen	1939–1954	Army	
John Jacobson Jr.	1954–1956	Army	
Francis B. McSwiney	1956–1975	Army	
John Blatsos	1975–1984	Army	
Lloyd M. Price	1984–1994	Army	
John E. Blair	1994–2004	Army	
Kenneth R. Clark	2004–2009	Air Force	
William N. Reddel III	2009–2017	Air Force	
David J. Mikolaities	2017–present	Army	

== Gallery ==
Past officeholders
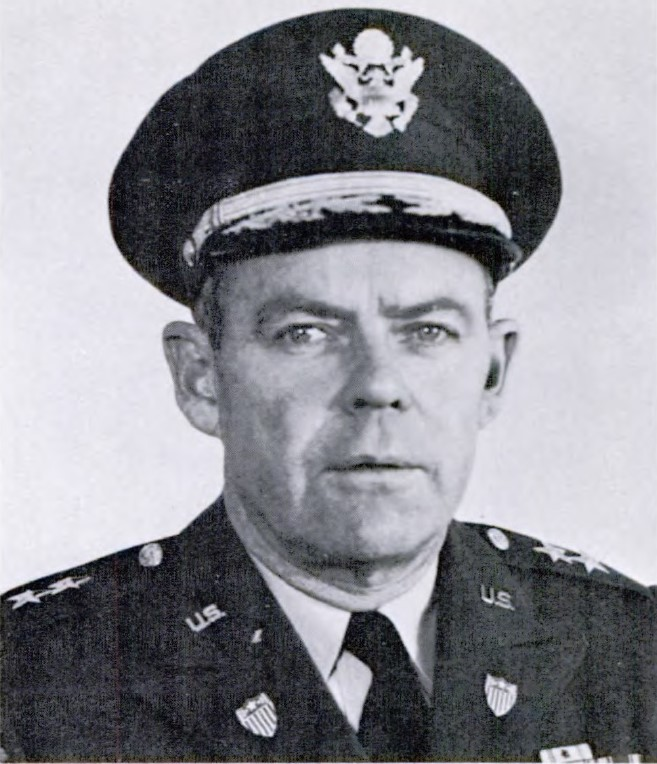
Francis B. McSwiney

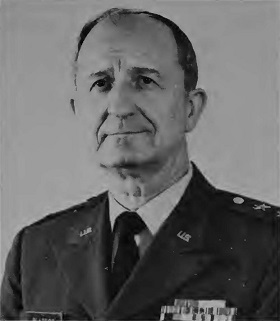
John Blatsos

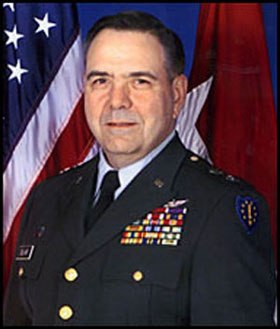
John E. Blair

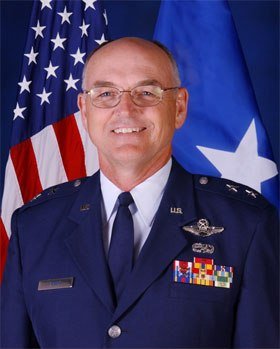
Kenneth R. Clark

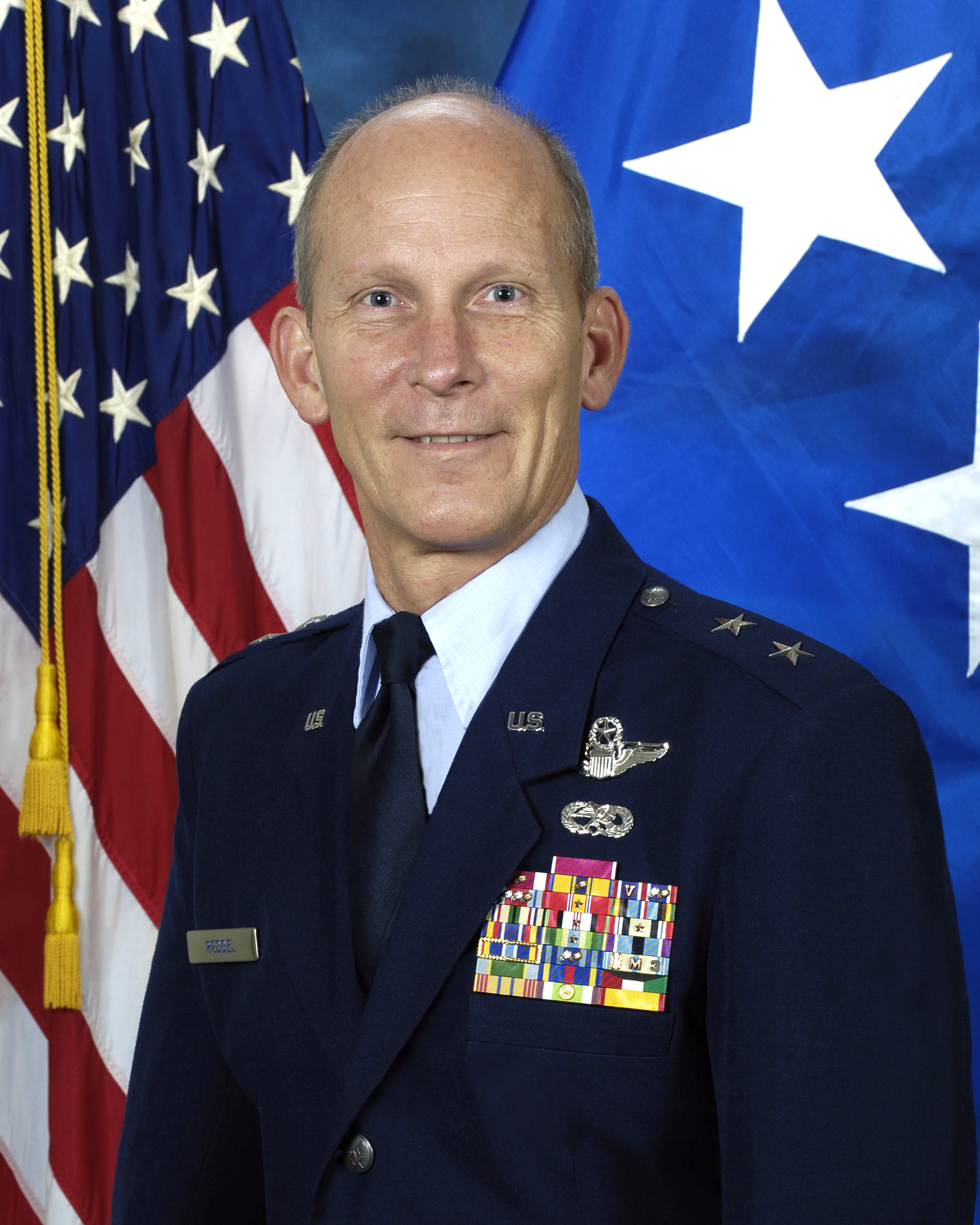
William N. Reddel III
