= Harl Pease =

Decorated American army officer (1917 - 1942)

Harl Pease Jr.
- Born: April 10, 1917; Plymouth, New Hampshire, U.S.
- Died: October 8, 1942 (aged 25); Rabaul, New Britain, Territory of New Guinea
- Burial place: Trinity Churchyard Cemetery, Holderness, New Hampshire, U.S. (Note: Pease's remains were not recovered. In addition to the noted cenotaph in New Hampshire, Pease is listed on a memorial in the Manila American Cemetery in the Philippines.)
- Education: University of New Hampshire
- Military career
- Allegiance: United States of America
- Branch: United States Army Air Corps
- Service years: 1939–1942
- Rank: Captain
- Service number: 0-395206
- Units: 93rd Bombardment Squadron, 19th Bombardment Group
- Conflicts: World War II
- Awards: Medal of Honor; Distinguished Flying Cross (2); Purple Heart; Air Medal

Harl Pease Jr. (April 10, 1917 – October 8, 1942) (Note: The Defense POW/MIA Accounting Agency lists August 7, 1942, as Pease's date of death. That was his missing-in-action date per the Missing Air Crew Report for his aircraft. He was officially declared dead on December 12, 1945.) was a United States Army Air Corps officer and a recipient of the United States military's highest award, the Medal of Honor, for his actions during World War II. Pease Air National Guard Base in New Hampshire is named for him.

== Biography ==
Pease was born and raised in Plymouth, New Hampshire; he graduated from high school there, then took college preparatory classes at Tilton School. He entered the University of New Hampshire in 1935, where he became a brother of Theta Chi fraternity. In 1939, he graduated with a degree in business administration and enlisted in the Army Air Corps.

Pease was commissioned as a second lieutenant in June 1940 and awarded pilot rating upon completion of flight training at Kelly Field, Texas. Pease was assigned to the 19th Bombardment Group (19th BG) as a B-17 pilot at Albuquerque Army Air Base, and in October 1941 flew with the group to Clark Field in the Philippines. As part of the Far East Air Force, Pease was present at Clark Field when it was bombed by Japanese aircraft on December 8, 1941, flew missions in defense of the Philippines, and evacuated with the group to Darwin, Northern Territory, on December 20, 1941. Pease continued to fly missions with the group in defense of Java until the end of February 1942.

As the Japanese advanced in the Philippines, Pease was ordered to lead three B-17s of the 19th BG to Del Monte Field on Mindanao to evacuate General Douglas MacArthur, along with the general's family and staff, to Australia. One of the battered planes was forced to abort early, while another developed engine trouble and crashed south of Del Monte. Pease landed his Fortress safely, despite its inoperative wheel brakes. MacArthur was shocked at the sight of Pease's aircraft, upon which the ground crews of the undersupplied 19th BG had used cut-up ration cans to patch bullet holes, as well as Pease himself, whom MacArthur described as a "child". MacArthur flatly refused to place his wife and son aboard Pease's B-17 and instead waited for another plane to arrive two days later.

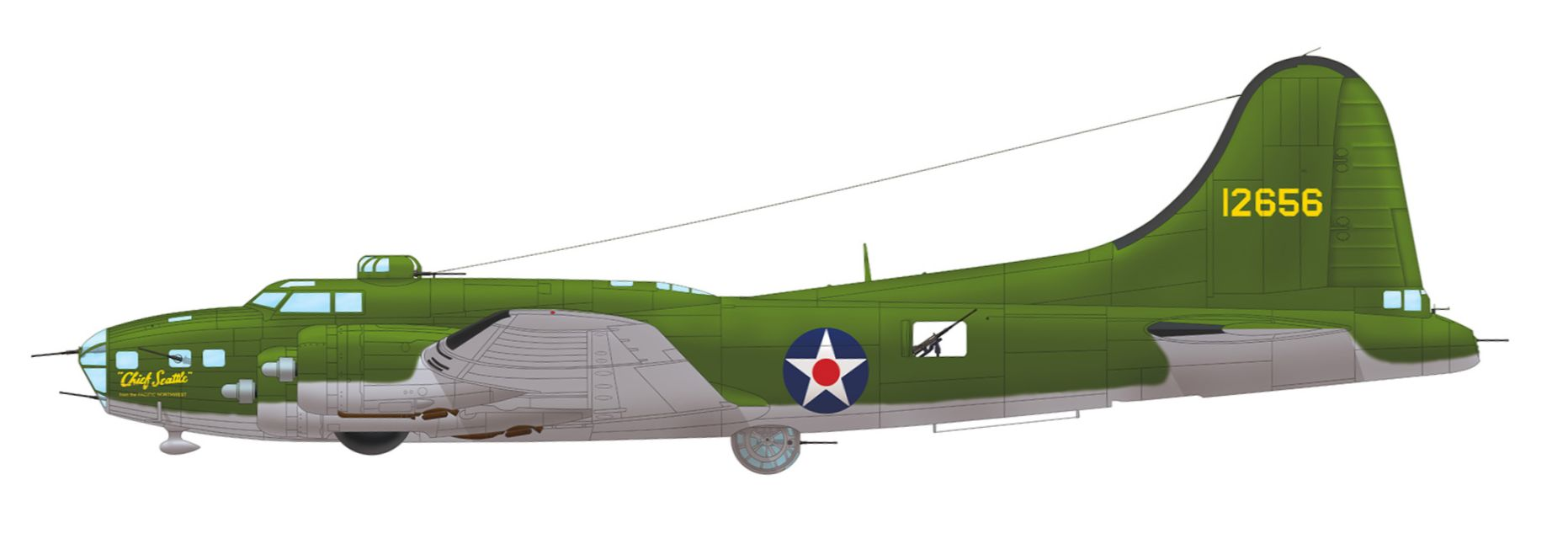
A B-17E of the 19th Bombardment Group, similar to the one Pease flew in his final mission (Note: B-17E serial number 41-2429, nicknamed Why Don’t We Do This More Often?)

Location of Rabaul in the Pacific Ocean

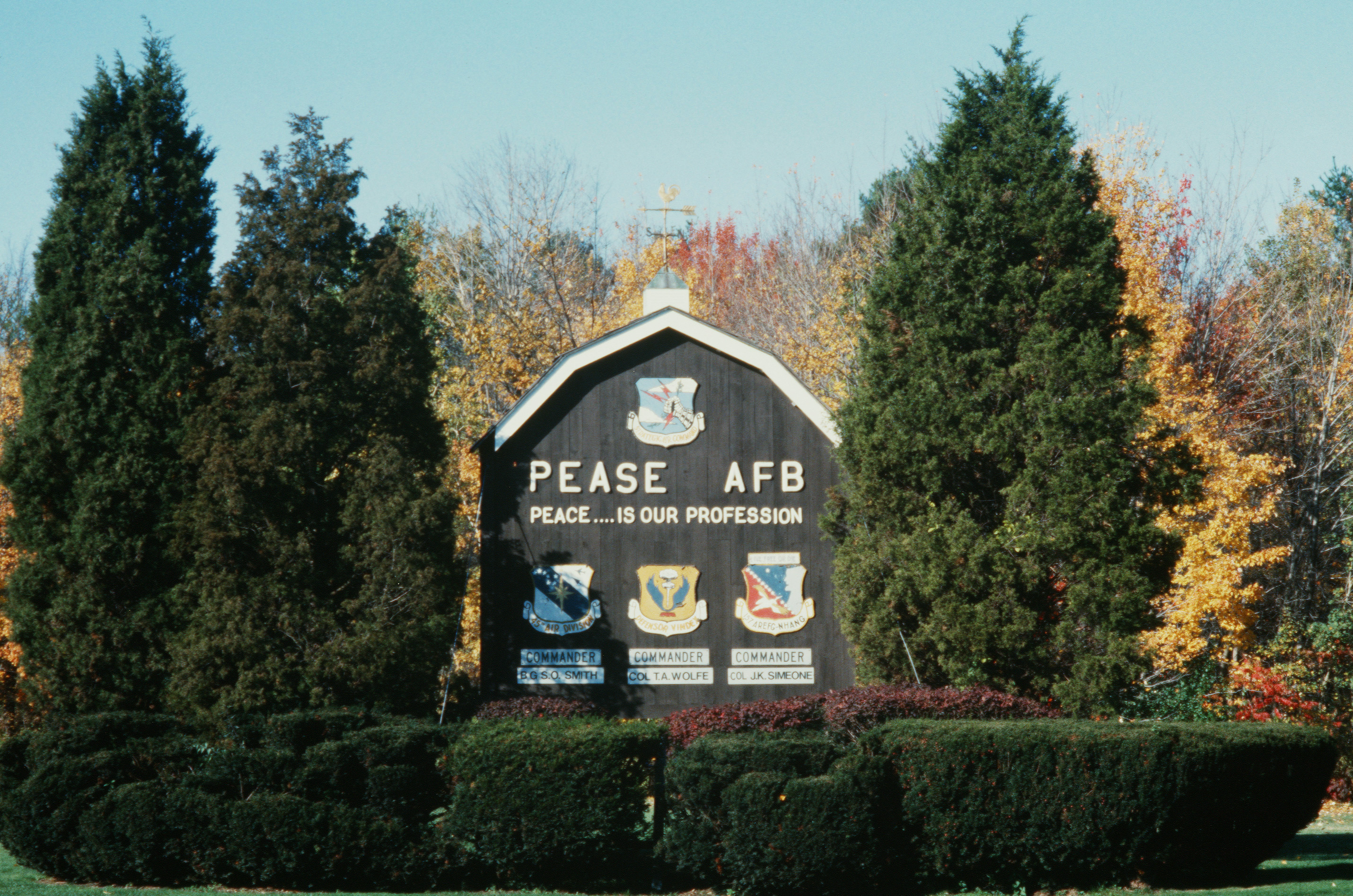
Entrance sign at Pease Air Force Base in 1987

In May, from a base near Townsville, Queensland, the 19th BG supported naval carrier aircraft in the Battle of the Coral Sea, and bombed targets on the north coast of New Guinea, 16–18 hour missions that necessitated staging through Port Moresby. During the first six months of the war, the 19th BG was awarded four Distinguished Unit Citations.

On August 6, 1942, one engine of Pease's B-17 failed during a mission, forcing a return to its base at Mareeba Airfield for repairs. The 19th BG had already scheduled a "maximum effort" mission against Rabaul, New Britain, on August 7 but Pease and his crew, with their aircraft out of commission, were not scheduled. Pease understood the importance of the mission and was determined to rejoin the group. Only one B-17 at Mareeba was able to fly, a "war-weary" bomber relegated to training. Its engines needed an overhaul, some armament had been dismounted, and the electric fuel-transfer pump had been used for replacement parts. Pease had a fuel tank installed in the bomb bay, with a handpump rigged to transfer fuel, and in less than three hours, was en route to Port Moresby with his crew, all of whom had also volunteered for the mission. They landed at 1:00 a.m. after working or flying almost continuously since 6:00 a.m. the previous day.

With only three hours' crew rest, Pease took off with the group to attack Rabaul's Vunakanau airdrome. While 40 to 50 miles (64 to 80 km) from the target, the group was attacked by more than 30 Japanese fighters. Pease and his crew claimed several of the fighters, fought their way to the target, and bombed successfully, but sustained heavy damage in the attacks.

After leaving the target area, Pease's crippled B-17 fell behind the rest of the formation. Once again attacked by fighters, he was seen to jettison the burning bomb bay fuel tank before falling back out of sight. Pease and his crew were presumed killed in action. Before the B-17 crashed, however, Pease and another crew member were able to bail out; both were captured and taken to a POW camp in Rabaul. Pease languished there until October 8, 1942. On that date, Pease, three other Americans, and two Australians were forced to dig their own grave, then were beheaded. Postwar, the remains of three of Pease's crew were found and identified; however, the remains of Pease and those killed with him were not recovered.

On December 2, 1942, the Medal of Honor, awarded posthumously to Pease, was presented by President Franklin D. Roosevelt to his parents. The recommendation for the award had been issued by Major General George Kenney, with an endorsement General MacArthur had personally written when Kenney notified him of Pease's death.

In June 1957, Portsmouth Air Force Base in New Hampshire was renamed Pease Air Force Base in his honor. It closed in March 1991; a portion continues to operate as Pease Air National Guard Base.

== Medal of Honor citation ==
- Pease, Harl Jr.

(Air Mission)

Rank and organization: captain, U.S. Army Air Corps, 93rd Bombardment Squadron. Place and date near Rabaul, New Britain, 6 – August 7, 1942. Entered service at: Plymouth, N.H. Birth: Plymouth, N.H. G.O. No.: 59, November 4, 1942.

Citation

For conspicuous gallantry and intrepidity above and beyond the call of duty in action with the enemy on 6–7 August 1942. When 1 engine of the bombardment airplane of which he was pilot failed during a bombing mission over New Guinea, Capt. Pease was forced to return to a base in Australia. Knowing that all available airplanes of his group were to participate the next day in an attack on an enemy-held airdrome near Rabaul, New Britain, although he was not scheduled to take part in this mission, Capt. Pease selected the most serviceable airplane at this base and prepared it for combat, knowing that it had been found and declared unserviceable for combat missions. With the members of his combat crew, who volunteered to accompany him, he rejoined his squadron at Port Moresby, New Guinea, at 1 a.m. on 7 August, after having flown almost continuously since early the preceding morning. With only 3 hours' rest, he took off with his squadron for the attack. Throughout the long flight to Rabaul, New Britain, he managed by skillful flying of his unserviceable airplane to maintain his position in the group. When the formation was intercepted by about 30 enemy fighter airplanes before reaching the target, Capt. Pease, on the wing which bore the brunt of the hostile attack, by gallant action and the accurate shooting by his crew, succeeded in destroying several Zeros before dropping his bombs on the hostile base as planned, this in spite of continuous enemy attacks. The fight with the enemy pursuit lasted 25 minutes until the group dived into cloud cover. After leaving the target, Capt. Pease's aircraft fell behind the balance of the group due to unknown difficulties as a result of the combat, and was unable to reach this cover before the enemy pursuit succeeded in igniting 1 of his bomb bay tanks. He was seen to drop the flaming tank. It is believed that Capt. Pease's airplane and crew were subsequently shot down in flames, as they did not return to their base. In voluntarily performing this mission Capt. Pease contributed materially to the success of the group, and displayed high devotion to duty, valor, and complete contempt for personal danger. His undaunted bravery has been a great inspiration to the officers and men of his unit.

== Awards and decorations ==

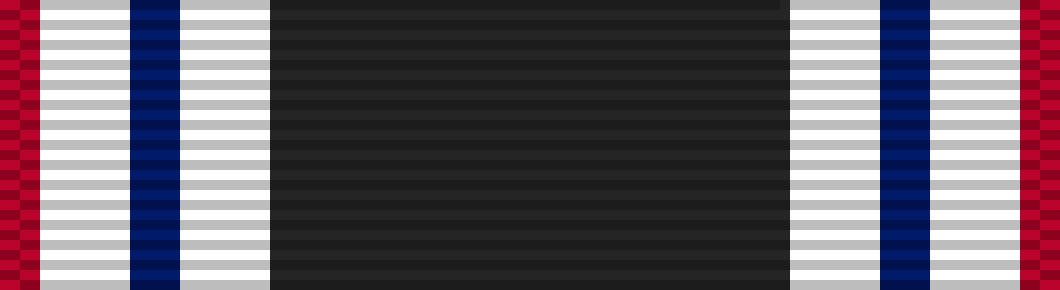

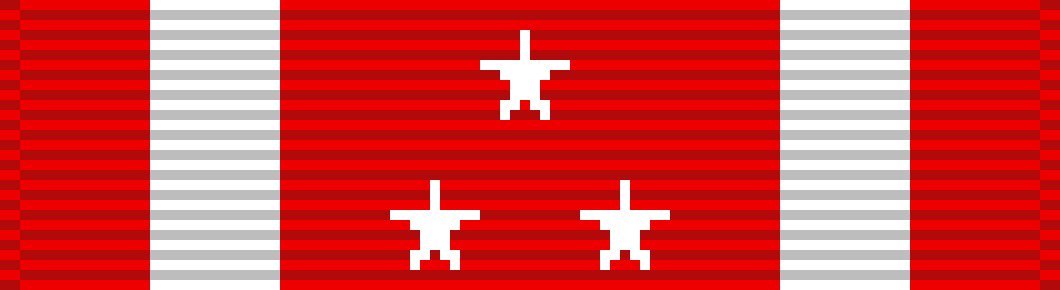

Badge	Army Air Forces Pilot Badge		
1st row	Medal of Honor		
2nd row	Distinguished Flying Cross with 1 Oak leaf cluster	Purple Heart	Air Medal
3rd row	Prisoner of War Medal	American Defense Service Medal with "Foreign Service" Clasp	American Campaign Medal
4th row	Asiatic-Pacific Campaign Medal with 3 Campaign stars	World War II Victory Medal	Philippine Defense Medal
Unit awards	Presidential Unit Citation		Philippine Presidential Unit Citation

== See also ==
- List of Medal of Honor recipients

== Sources ==
- Jablonski, Edward (1968). Flying Fortress—The Illustrated Biography of The B-17s and The Men Who Flew Them. Doubleday. ISBN 978-0385038553.
- Murphy, Edward F. (1990). Heroes of World War II. Presidio Press. ISBN 978-0891413677.
