= Concord Municipal Airport =

Airport in New Hampshire, United States

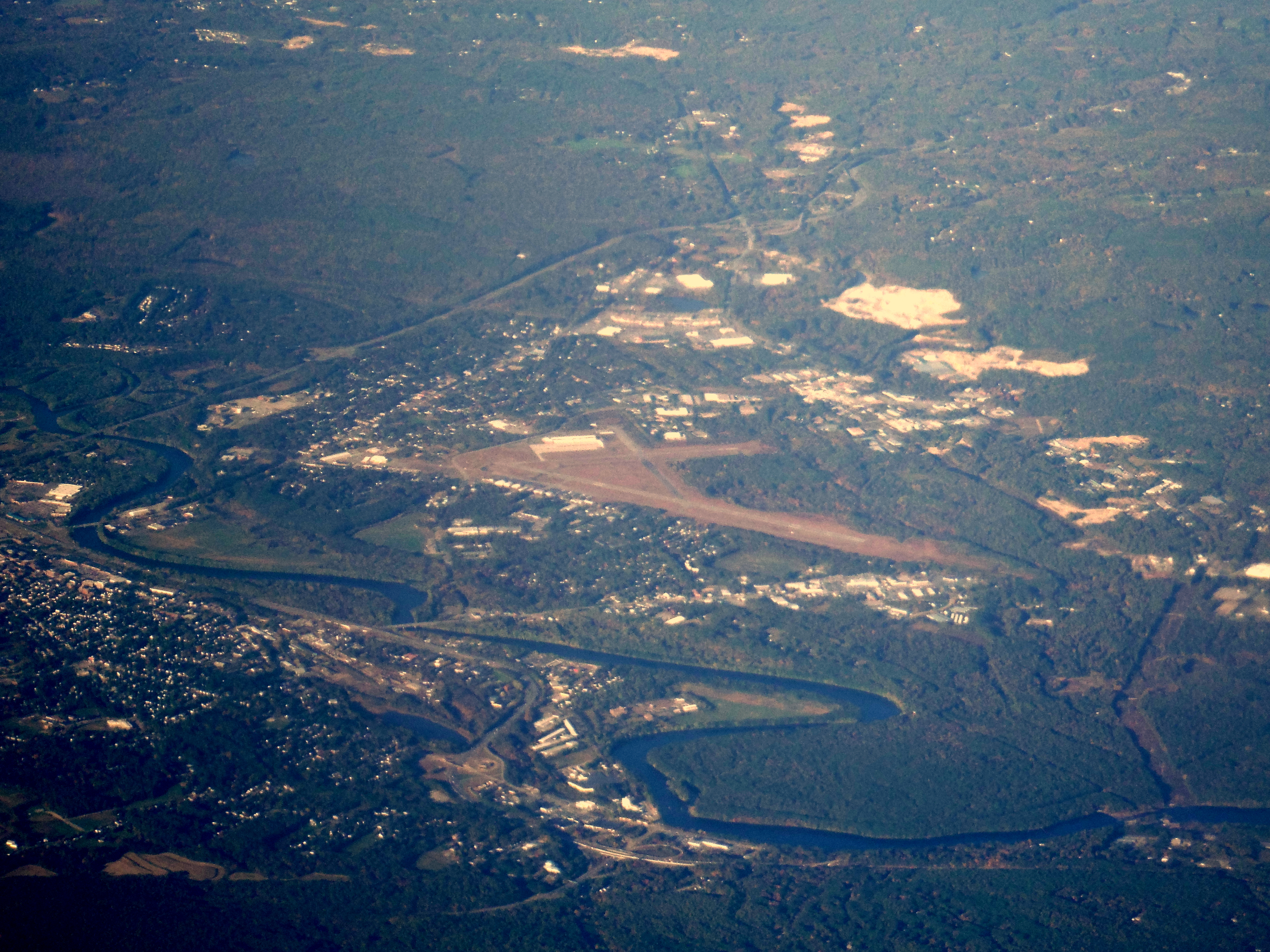
- Aerial view of airport (2014)
- IATA: CON; ICAO: KCON; FAA LID: CON

Summary
- Airport type: General aviation
- Owner: City of Concord
- Operator: Concord Aviation Services
- Serves: Concord, New Hampshire
- Elevation AMSL: 346 ft (105 m)
- Coordinates: 43°12′10″N 071°30′08″W
- Website: Official website

Maps
- Location of airport in New Hampshire/United States
- Interactive map of Concord Municipal Airport

Runways
Direction	Length		Surface
Direction	ft	m	Surface
12/30	3,200	975	Asphalt
17/35	6,005	1,830	Asphalt

Concord Municipal Airport (IATA: CON, ICAO: KCON, FAA LID: CON) is a public-use airport located 2 miles (3 km) east of the central business district of Concord, a city in Merrimack County, New Hampshire, United States.

It is included in the Federal Aviation Administration (FAA) National Plan of Integrated Airport Systems for 2017–2021, in which it is categorized as a local general aviation facility.

The airport is publicly owned by the City of Concord. There was once scheduled airline service at the airport on Northeast Airlines. Nearby Manchester-Boston Regional Airport in Manchester, 20 miles (32 km) south of Concord Airport (accessible by a 25-mile drive down the F.E. Everett Turnpike), has largely succeeded Concord for most commercial and even some general aviation flights.

== Facilities ==
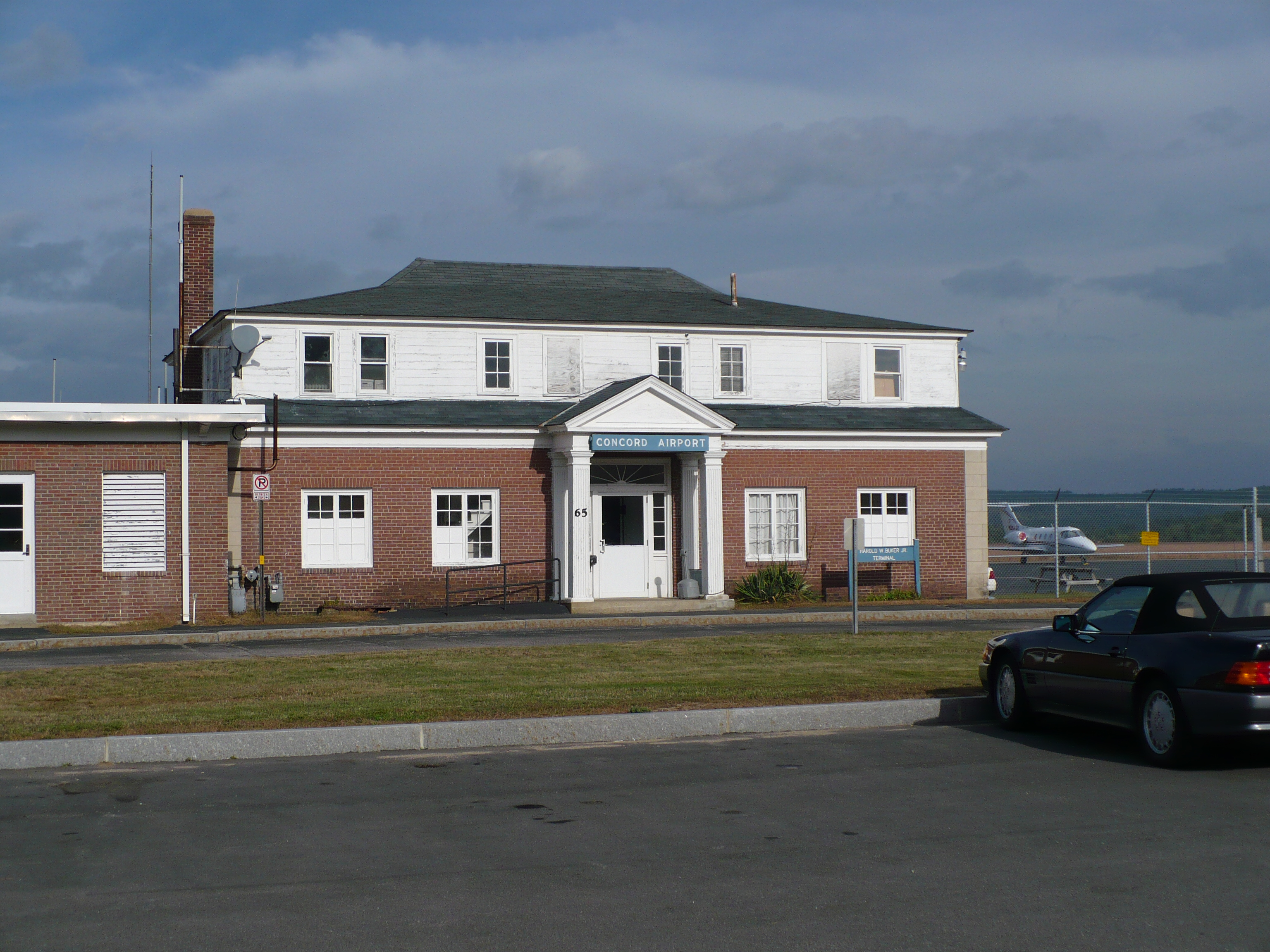
Terminal building

Concord Municipal Airport covers an area of 697 acres (282 ha) and has two runways:

- Runway 17/35: 6,005 x 100 ft (1,830 x 30 m), surface: asphalt
- Runway 12/30: 3,200 x 75 ft (975 x 23 m), surface: asphalt

Concord Aviation Services provides full and self-service 100LL fuel and full-service Jet A fuel. There are long-term tie-down spots for multiple small aircraft on the southern part of the ramp, and two hangars for year-round aircraft storage.

Concord Aviation Services does mechanical work in its main hangar, on both its own aircraft and those of customers.

== See also ==
- List of airports in New Hampshire
