= New Hampshire State Guard =

- The shoulder patch worn by New Hampshire State Guardsmen during World War II.
- Active: 1917–1919; 1941–1947
- Country: United States
- Allegiance: New Hampshire
- Branch: Army
- Type: State defense force
- Role: Military reserve force
- Size: 1 regiment (World War I); 1,000+ (World War II)
- Part of: New Hampshire Adjutant General's Department
- Garrison/HQ: Concord, New Hampshire

Commanders
- Civilian leadership: Governor of New Hampshire

The New Hampshire State Guard (NHSG) is the currently unorganized state defense force of New Hampshire. The purpose of the State Guard is to augment or replace the New Hampshire National Guard by assuming the National Guard's stateside duties when any part of the National Guard is federalized. However, unlike the National Guard, the State Guard is a purely state-level military force which cannot be federalized or deployed outside the state of New Hampshire. The NHSG is a component of the organized militia of New Hampshire.

== History ==
=== Predecessor units ===
The first militia unit responsible for the defense of New Hampshire was the colonial-era New Hampshire Militia. During the American Revolutionary War, New Hampshire raised multiple units of militia in support of the Patriot cause. Later, during the American Civil War, New Hampshire raised multiple units in support of the Union campaign. After the passage of the Militia Act of 1903, the state militia was reorganized as a federal reserve unit as a component of the National Guard of the United States.

=== World War I ===
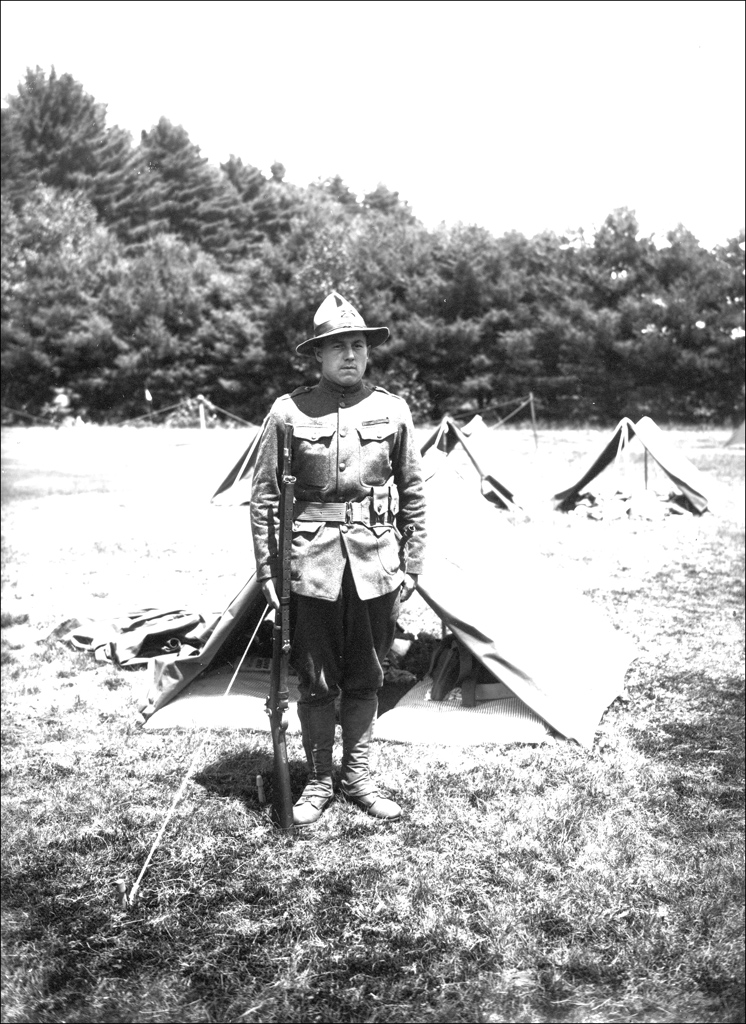
An early 20th century New Hampshire State Guard soldier stands at attention by a tent in Keene, New Hampshire.

The federalization of the National Guard during World War I left states with no means to protect their citizens against invasion, sabotage, insurrection, natural disasters, or other emergencies generally contained by the National Guard. To compensate for the loss of National Guard units, Congress passed in 1916 the National Defense Act, which permitted states to raise Home Guard units to serve as replacements for National Guard units in federal service for the duration of the war; these Home Guard units would remain under state control but could receive surplus rifles, ammunition, and other supplies from the federal government at the discretion of the Secretary of War. The New Hampshire State Guard was created in 1917, and by January 1919 consisted of one infantry regiment with a strength of 57 officers and 938 enlisted men.

=== World War II ===
In 1940, the entire National Guard of the United States was federalized in anticipation of American entry into World War II. On October 21, 1940, President Franklin D. Roosevelt signed the State Guard Act, which once again gave states the authority to maintain military forces outside of the federal chain of command. Initially, reactivation of the New Hampshire State Guard was met with some resistance. Some state lawmakers intended to pass the costs of the state's defense onto the federal government by relying on federal soldiers instead of raising a state force; the New Hampshire State Police preferred hiring more full-time state police officers. Nonetheless, the New Hampshire State Guard was reactivated in April 1941. In 1947, the last armory under State Guard control was turned over to the National Guard.

==== Equipment ====
The New Hampshire State Guard was initially issued rifles by the War Department. However, in 1942 the rifles were recollected by the War Department for use elsewhere and shotguns were issued to the State Guard as replacements. By February 1944, the War Department began reissuing rifles to the State Guard. The State Guard also possessed wireless radio equipment.

In 1943, the State Guard requested access to obsolete light tanks under control of the Army Service Forces, but the request was denied.

== Reactivation effort ==
In 2011, a bill was introduced in the New Hampshire General Court which, if passed, would permanently reestablish the New Hampshire State Guard. The bill did not pass.

== Legal status ==
State defense forces are recognized by the federal government under Title 32, Section 109 of the United States Code. Twenty-three states and the territory of Puerto Rico currently maintain active state defense forces. New Hampshire law also allows the Governor of New Hampshire to organize and maintain the New Hampshire State Guard, either as a full-sized force when any part of the National Guard is federally deployed, or as a reserve cadre of officers and enlisted personnel regardless of whether or not any National Guard members are in federal service.

== See also ==
- Civil Air Patrol
- Naval militia
- United States Coast Guard Auxiliary
