= 2nd Infantry Division (United States) =

Active US Army formation

- 2nd ID Shoulder Sleeve Insignia
- Active: 21 September 1917–present
- Country: United States of America; South Korea
- Branch: United States Army
- Type: Infantry
- Role: Headquarters
- Size: Division
- Part of: Eighth Army
- Garrison/HQ: Camp Humphreys, South Korea
- Nickname: "Indianhead"
- Motto: "Second to None"
- Colors: Red and blue
- March: "Warrior March"
- Engagements: World War I; Aisne; Aisne-Marne; St. Mihiel; Meuse-Argonne; Ile de France 1918; Lorraine 1918; World War II; Normandy; Northern France; Rhineland; Ardennes-Alsace; Central Europe; Korean War; UN Defensive; UN Offensive; CCF Intervention; First UN Counteroffensive; Third Battle of Seoul; War on terror; Afghanistan; Iraqi
- Website: Facebook page

Commanders
- Current commander: Brigadier General Robert (Todd) S. Brown
- Deputy Commanding General (Maneuver): Brigadier General Jason H. Rosenstrauch
- Deputy Commanding General (Support): Colonel G. Patrick Schuck
- Deputy Commanding General (ROKA): Brigadier General Han Ok Moon, ROK Army
- Command Sergeant Major: Command Sergeant Major Christopher Shaiko
- Notable commanders: Complete list of commanders

Insignia
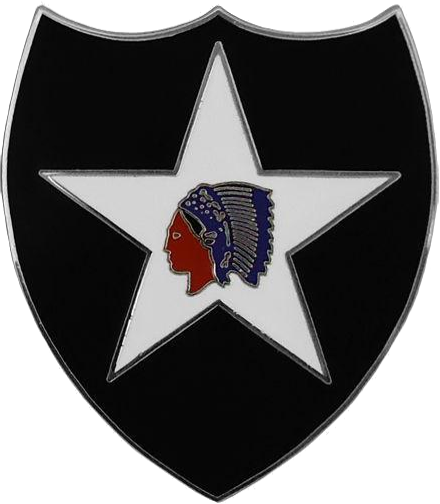
- Combat service identification badge

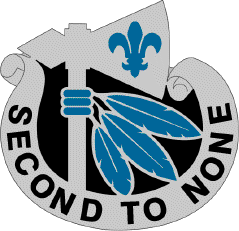
- Distinctive insignia

- Flag

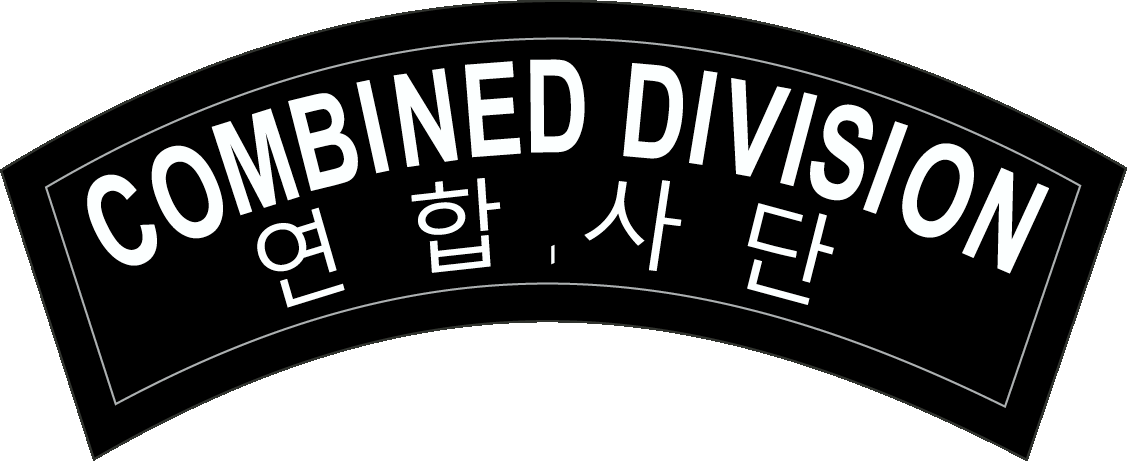
- 2nd ID and 16th MIB (ROKA) Combined Div HQ Tab

The 2nd Infantry Division (2ID, 2nd ID) ("Indianhead") is a formation of the United States Army. Since the 1960s, its primary mission has been the defense of South Korea in the event of an invasion from North Korea. Approximately 17,000 soldiers serve in the 2nd Infantry Division, with 10,000 stationed in South Korea, accounting for about 35% of the United States Forces Korea personnel. Known as the 2nd Infantry Division-ROK/U.S. Combined Division (2ID/RUCD), the division is bolstered by rotational Brigade Combat Teams (BCTs) from other U.S. Army divisions.

The 2nd Infantry Division is unique as the only U.S. Army division to incorporate South Korean soldiers through the Korean Augmentation to the United States Army (KATUSA) program, which began in 1950 with the agreement of South Korean President Syngman Rhee. By the end of the Korean War, around 27,000 KATUSAs had served with U.S. forces. As of May 2006, roughly 1,100 KATUSA soldiers are assigned to 2ID. Between 1950 and 1954, over 4,748 Dutch soldiers also served with the division.

== History ==
=== World War I ===
The 2nd Division was first constituted on 21 September 1917 in the Regular Army. It was organized on 26 October 1917 at Bourmont, Haute Marne, France.

==== Order of battle ====
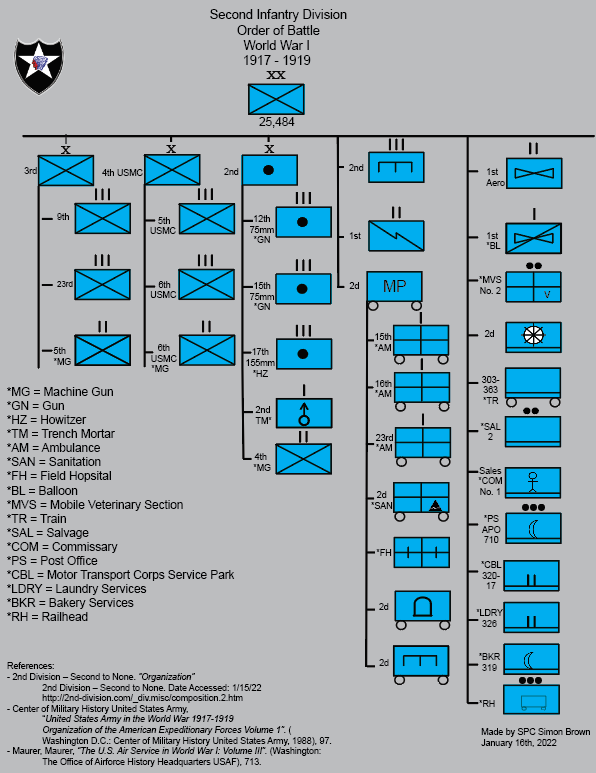
Order of Battle for the Second Infantry Division in the First World War

- Headquarters, 2nd Division
- 3rd Infantry Brigade
  - 9th Infantry Regiment
  - 23rd Infantry Regiment
  - 5th Machine Gun Battalion
- 4th Marine Brigade
  - 5th Marine Regiment
  - 6th Marine Regiment
  - 6th Machine Gun Battalion
- 2nd Field Artillery Brigade
  - 12th Field Artillery Regiment (75 mm)
  - 15th Field Artillery Regiment (75 mm)
  - 17th Field Artillery Regiment (155 mm)
  - 2nd Trench Mortar Battery
- 4th Machine Gun Battalion
- 2nd Engineer Regiment
- 1st Field Signal Battalion
- Headquarters Troop, 2nd Division
- 2nd Train Headquarters and Military Police
  - 2nd Ammunition Train
  - 2nd Supply Train
  - 2nd Engineer Train
  - 2nd Sanitary Train
    - 1st, 15th, 16th, and 23rd Ambulance Companies and Field Hospitals

Twice during World War I the division was commanded by US Marine Corps generals, Brigadier General Charles A. Doyen and Major General John A. Lejeune (after whom the Marine Corps Camp in North Carolina is named), the only time in U.S. military history when Marine Corps officers commanded an army division.

The division spent the winter of 1917–18 training with French and Scottish veterans. Though judged unprepared by French tacticians, the American Expeditionary Forces (AEF) was committed to combat in the spring of 1918 in a desperate attempt to halt a German advance toward Paris. Brigadier General Edward Mann Lewis commanded the 3rd Brigade as they deployed to reinforce the battered French along the Paris to Metz road. The division first fought at the Battle of Belleau Wood and contributed to shattering the four-year-old stalemate on the battlefield during the Château-Thierry campaign that followed.

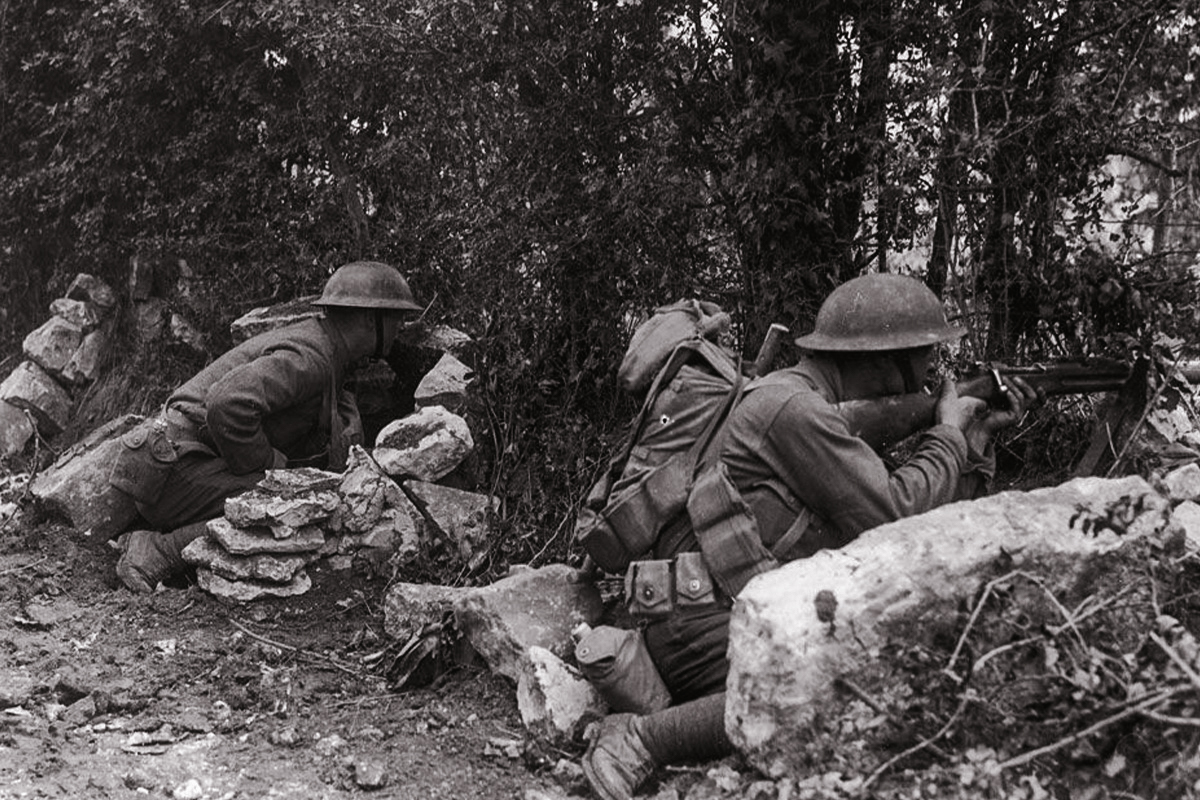
Doughboys of the 23rd Infantry Regiment, 2nd Division, holding a line behind a stone wall in Belleau Wood, near Château-Thierry, France, June 5, 1918.

On 28 July 1918, Marine Corps Major General Lejeune assumed command of the 2nd Division and remained in that capacity until August 1919, when the unit returned to the US. The division went on to win hard-fought victories at Soissons and Blanc Mont. Finally the Indianhead Division participated in the Meuse-Argonne Offensive which ended any German hope for victory. On 11 November 1918 the Armistice was declared, and the 2nd Division entered Germany, where it assumed occupation duties until April 1919.

The 2nd Division was three times awarded the French Croix de guerre for gallantry under fire at Belleau Wood, Soissons, and Blanc Mont. This entitles current members of the division and of those regiments that were part of the division at that time (including the 5th and 6th Marine Regiments) to wear a special lanyard, or fourragère, in commemoration. The Navy authorized a special uniform change that allows hospital corpsmen assigned to 5th and 6th Marine Regiments to wear a shoulder strap on the left shoulder of their dress uniform so that the fourragère can be worn.

The division lost 1,964 (plus USMC: 4,478) killed in action and 9,782 (plus USMC: 17,752) wounded in action.

==== Major operations ====
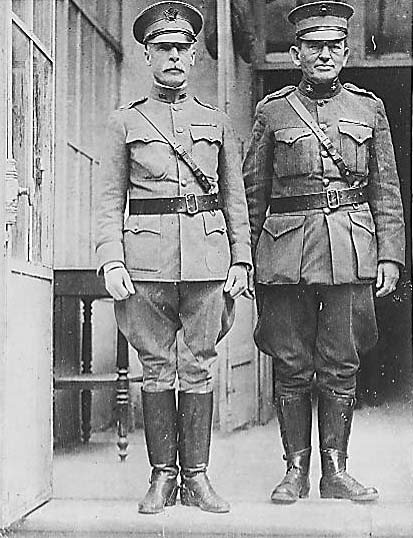
Omar Bundy & John A. Lejeune

- Third Battle of the Aisne
- Belleau Wood
- Château-Thierry campaign
- St. Mihiel
- Meuse-Argonne Offensive
- Aisne-Marne offensive
- Source for World War I data and information: United States Army Center of Military History, The Army Almanac: A Book of Facts Concerning the Army of the United States, U.S. Government Printing Office, 1950, pp. 510–592.

=== Interwar period ===
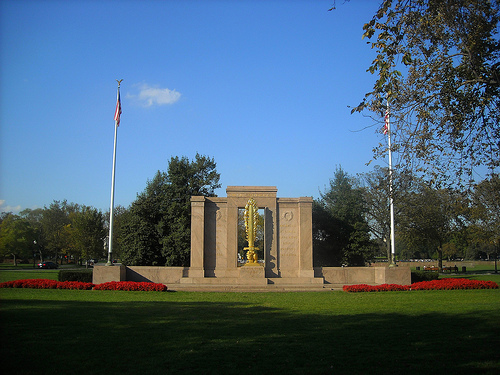
Second Division Memorial, dedicated in 1936, is located in President's Park, Washington, D.C.

The 2nd Division arrived at Hoboken, New Jersey, on 3 August 1919 after completing 8 months of occupation duty near Koblenz, Heddesdorf, and Dierdorf, Germany. It moved to Camp Mills, New York, where all emergency period personnel were discharged from the service, and the 4th Marine Brigade was relieved from assignment to the division. It proceeded to Camp Travis, in San Antonio, Texas, on 16 August 1919 where it remained until Camp Travis was absorbed into Fort Sam Houston in 1922. The 4th Infantry Brigade (consisting of the 1st and 20th Infantry Regiments) was assigned to replace the 4th Marine Brigade in the division structure, and was activated in October 1920 at Camp Travis. The division was allotted to the Eighth Corps Area and the VIII Corps in 1921. The 2nd Division was the most combat-ready division stationed in the continental United States during most of the interwar period, given that the majority of the unit was stationed at a single post and the division headquarters staff was not allowed to atrophy like those of the 1st or 3rd Divisions, the other two nominally active stateside Regular Army divisions.

During the early post-World War I period, the division's time was spent rebuilding and training on a limited scale. The slow pace left time for the division to assist Hollywood in making movies about the Army. Division units participated in Metro-Goldwyn-Mayer's movie The Big Parade in May and June 1925 and in Wings in April 1926. By 1926, however, maneuver training of divisional units was becoming more frequent, leaving little time for movies. The maneuvers generally took place in May, before the division's units assisted the training of Organized Reserve units, Citizens Military Training Camps (CMTC), and ROTC cadets during the summer. Typically, the division would deploy to Camp Bullis, Texas, or areas west of San Antonio, and perform field training, usually at company and battalion level. The division deployment would culminate in brigade-versus-brigade maneuvers near the end of the field training period.

After transfer of the 4th Infantry Brigade to Fort D.A. Russell, Wyoming (later renamed Fort Francis E. Warren), in 1927, the 1st Cavalry Division's 1st Cavalry Brigade began to road-march over from Fort Clark, Texas, to participate in combined arms maneuvers each May. Once the division maneuvers were complete, the division shifted to training the Reserve components. The 3d Infantry Brigade usually trained Reserve officers of the 90th Division, Infantry CMTC, and ROTC cadets. Units of the 2nd Field Artillery Brigade trained the artillery officers of the 90th Division, the XVIII Corps, and several General Headquarters Reserve (GHQR) artillery units in the Eighth Corps Area. After transferring to Fort Francis E. Warren, the 4th Infantry Brigade conducted their maneuver training at the Pole Mountain Military Reservation where they also trained their affiliate Reserve units of the 104th Division. In 1936, the division participated in the Third Army command post exercise (CPX) at Camp Bullis to prepare army, corps, and division staffs for future large-scale army maneuvers. The next major training event for the division came in September 1937 when it participated in the Provisional Infantry Division (PID) tests at Camp Bullis. The “Indianhead” Division was temporarily reorganized with three regiments to test the concept of the “triangular” division. The exercise was apparently very successful as further tests were called for after analysis of the results by Army planners. The following year, units of the Eighth Corps Area including the 2nd Division were assembled at Camp Bullis for the Third Army maneuvers. In January 1939, the division was reorganized for the second time as a triangular division, this time for the Provisional 2nd Division (P2D) tests. These tests finalized the decision to adopt the new triangular organization for Regular Army divisions. As a result, in October 1939, the division's 4th Infantry Brigade was disbanded, the 1st and 20th Infantry Regiments were relieved from assignment, and the 38th Infantry Regiment was assigned to the division to make its transition to the triangular concept complete.

In May 1940, the “Indianhead” Division deployed to the vicinity of Horton, Texas, to train under the new organization in preparation for the next Third Army maneuver. The 1940 Third Army maneuvers were held in west-central Louisiana in August 1940 and were primarily performed with the Regular Army and National Guard divisions stationed in the Fourth and Eighth Corps Areas. After the exercises in Louisiana, the “Indianhead” Division returned to Fort Sam Houston. The following June, the division moved to Brownwood, Texas, to participate in the VIII Corps maneuver held there that month. In August 1941, the division, now redesignated as the 2nd Infantry Division, returned to the Louisiana Maneuver Area for the GHQ maneuvers between the Second and Third Armies, after which it returned to its home station.

On 27 July 1942, the division was again transferred to the Louisiana Maneuver Area, remaining there until 22 September 1942, whereupon the formation again returned to Fort Sam Houston. It then moved to Camp McCoy at Sparta, Wisconsin, on 27 November 1942. Four months of intensive training for winter warfare followed. In September 1943 the division received its staging orders, and moved to the Camp Shanks staging area at Orangeburg, New York on 3 October 1943, where it received port call orders. On 8 October the division officially sailed from the New York Port of Embarkation, and started arriving in Belfast, Northern Ireland on 17 October. It then moved to England, where it trained and staged for forward movement to France.

=== World War II ===
==== Division organization ====
The 2nd Infantry Division consisted of the following units:

2nd Infantry Division organization (click to enlarge)

- 2nd Infantry Division
  - 2nd Infantry Division Headquarters
  - 2nd Cavalry Reconnaissance Troop (Mechanized) (M3 scout cars and then M8 Greyhound armored cars)
  - 9th Infantry Regiment
    - Headquarters and Headquarters Company
    - 3× Infantry battalions
      - each battalion consists of: 1× Headquarters and Headquarters Company, 3× Rifle companies, 1× Heavy Weapons Company
    - Cannon Company (T12 Gun Motor Carriages and T19 Howitzer Motor Carriages, later replaced by either M3 105mm towed howitzers or M7 Priest self propelled howitzers)
    - Anti-Tank Company (M3 37mm anti-tank guns, which were replaced by 1944 with M1 57mm anti-tank guns)
    - Service Company
  - 23rd Infantry Regiment
    - same organization as 9th Infantry Regiment
  - 38th Infantry Regiment
    - same organization as 9th Infantry Regiment
  - 2nd Infantry Division Artillery
    - Headquarters and Headquarters Battery
    - 12th Field Artillery Battalion
      - Headquarters and Headquarters Battery
      - 3× Batteries (M1 155mm towed howitzers)
      - Service Battery
    - 15th Field Artillery Battalion
      - Headquarters and Headquarters Battery
      - 3× Batteries (M2 105mm towed howitzers)
      - Service Battery
    - 37th Field Artillery Battalion
      - same organization as 15th Field Artillery Battalion
    - 38th Field Artillery Battalion
      - same organization as 15th Field Artillery Battalion
  - Headquarters Special Troops
    - Headquarters Company, 2nd Infantry Division
    - 2nd Signal Company
    - 2nd Quartermaster Company
    - 702nd Ordnance Light Maintenance Company
    - 2nd Military Police Platoon
    - 2nd Infantry Division Band (attached)
  - 12th Engineer Combat Battalion
    - Headquarters and Headquarters and Service Company
    - 3× Engineer combat companies
  - 2nd Medical Battalion
    - Headquarters and Headquarters Detachment
    - 3× Collecting companies
    - Clearing Company

==== Combat chronicle ====
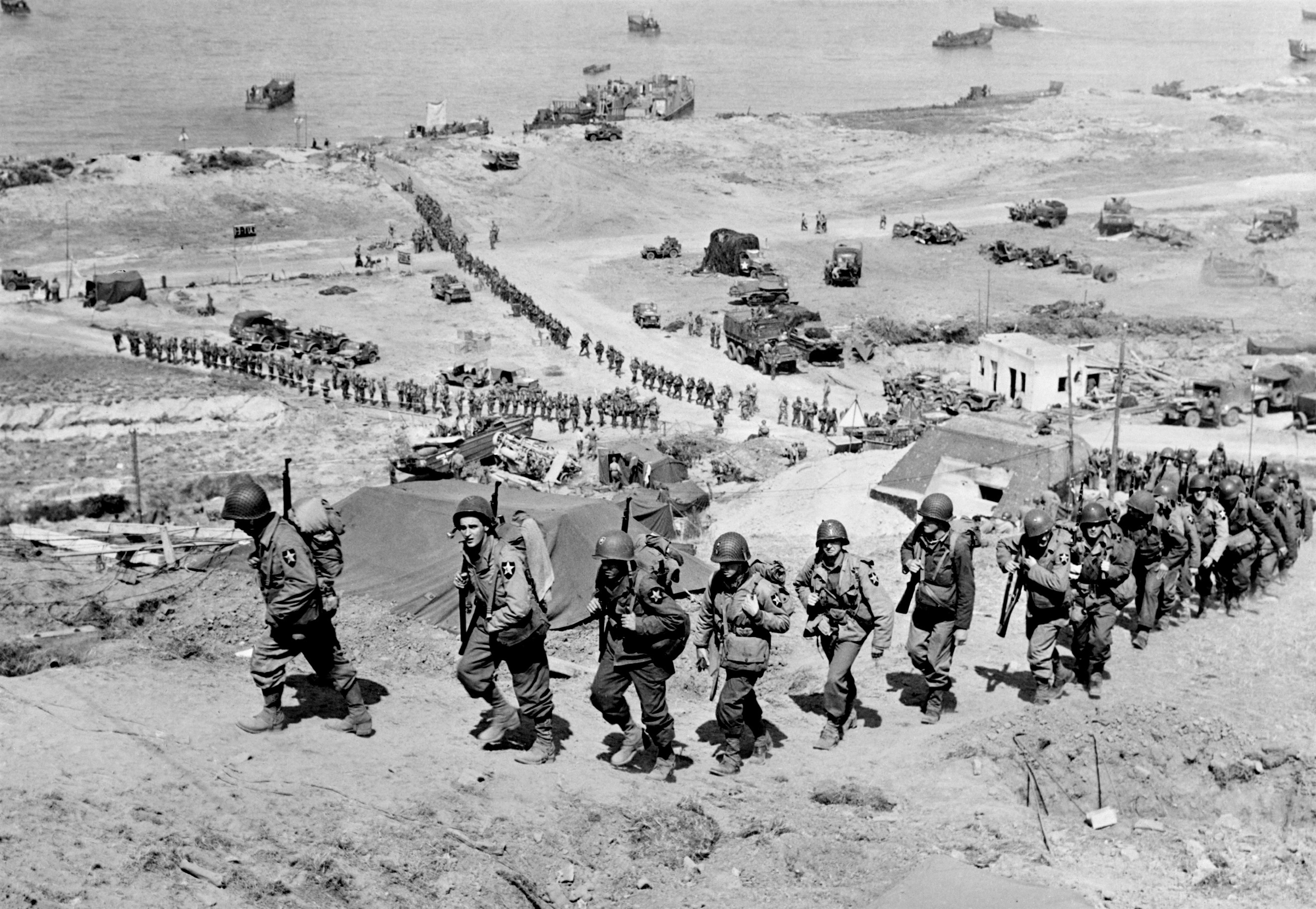
2nd Infantry Division troops marching up the bluff at the E-1 draw of Omaha Beach on 7 June 1944

2nd Infantry Division troops during the Battle for Brest in September 1944

After training in Northern Ireland and Wales from October 1943 to June 1944, the 2nd Infantry Division crossed the channel to land on Omaha Beach on D plus 1 (7 June 1944) near Saint-Laurent-sur-Mer. Around 150 men from the 9th & 23d Infantry Regiments and 2nd Combat Engineer Battalion volunteered to assist the operations of the Special Engineer Task Force on June 6th. These men were dispersed into the Assault Gap Teams of the 146th & 299th Combat Engineer Battalions and landed with them at H-Plus 3 at Omaha Beach. It's estimated that 13 of these volunteers were killed in action supporting SETF on 6 June 1944. These were the division's first casualties since World War I.

On 8 June 1944 23d Regimental Headquarters, Headquarters Company, A.T. Company, Cannon Company, Medical Detachment, 1st, 2nd, 3rd Bn. landed on Easy White beach. The regimental command post (C.P.) was set up in St. Laurent Sur-Mer. They were placed in division reserve until heavy weapons and vehicles arrived.

On 9 June the 1st, 2nd and 29th Divisions assembled for an attack on Trevieres. They were opposed by the German units of the 513th Schnelle Bn, 352nd Inf. Div., 17th SS Panzer Div., and 30th Schnelle Brigade. Enemy concentration was reported to be generally south and southeast of the town.

Attacking across the Aure River on 10 June, the division liberated Trévières and proceeded to assault and secure Hill 192, a key enemy strong point on the road to Saint-Lo. After three weeks of fortifying the position and by order of Commanding General Walter M. Robertson, the order was given to take Hill 192. On 11 July under the command of Col. Ralph Wise Zwicker the 38th Infantry Regiment and with the 9th and the 23d by his side the battle began at 5:45am. Using an artillery concept from World War I (rolling barrage) and with the support of 25,000 rounds of HE/WP that were fired by 8 artillery battalions, the hill was taken. Except for three days during the Battle of the Bulge, this was the heaviest expenditure of ammunition by the 38th Field Artillery Battalion, and it was the only time during the 11 months of combat that 2nd Division artillery used a rolling barrage. The division went on the defensive until 26 July. After exploiting the Saint-Lo breakout, the 2nd Division then advanced across the Vire to take Tinchebray on 15 August 1944. The division then raced toward Brest, the heavily defended port fortress that was a major port for German U-boats. After 39 days of fighting the Battle for Brest was won, and was the first place the Army Air Forces used bunker busting bombs.

2nd Infantry Division troops march back from the front at Elsenborn in Belgium on 20 December 1944

2nd Infantry Division and 2nd Armored Division troops rest along a street in Leipzig on 18 April 1945

The division took a brief rest 19–26 September before moving to defensive positions at St. Vith, Belgium on 29 September 1944. The division entered Germany on 3 October 1944, and was ordered, on 11 December 1944, to attack and seize the Roer River dams. The German Ardennes offensive in mid-December forced the division to withdraw to defensive positions near Elsenborn Ridge, where the German drive was halted. In February 1945 the division attacked, recapturing lost ground, and seized Gemund, 4 March. Reaching the Rhine on 9 March, the division advanced south to take Breisig, 10–11 March, and to guard the Remagen bridge, 12–20 March.

The division crossed the Rhine on 21 March and advanced to Hadamar and Limburg an der Lahn, relieving elements of the 9th Armored Division, 28 March. Advancing rapidly in the wake of the 9th Armored, the 2nd Infantry Division crossed the Weser at Veckerhagen, 6–7 April, captured Göttingen 8 April, established a bridgehead across the Saale, 14 April, seizing Merseburg on 15 April. On 18 April the division took Leipzig, mopped up in the area, and outposted the Mulde River; elements which had crossed the river were withdrawn 24 April. Relieved on the Mulde, the 2nd moved 200 miles, 1–3 May, to positions along the German-Czech border near Schönsee and Waldmünchen, where 2 ID relieved the 97th and 99th IDs. The division crossed over to Czechoslovakia on 4 May 1945, and attacked in the general direction of Pilsen, attacking that city on VE Day. The division lost 3,031 killed in action, 12,785 wounded in action, and 457 died of wounds.

The 2nd Infantry Division returned to the New York Port of Embarkation on 20 July 1945, and arrived at Camp Swift at Bastrop, Texas on 22 July 1945. They started a training schedule to prepare them to participate in the scheduled invasion of Japan, but they were still at Camp Swift on VJ Day. They then moved to the staging area at Camp Stoneman at Pittsburg, California on 28 March 1946, but the move eastward was canceled, and they received orders to move to Fort Lewis at Tacoma, Washington. They arrived at Fort Lewis on 15 April 1946, which became their home station. From their Fort Lewis base, they conducted Arctic, air transportability, amphibious, and maneuver training.

==== Casualties ====
- Total battle casualties: 16,795
- Killed in action: 3,031
- Wounded in action: 12,785
- Missing in action: 193
- Prisoner of war: 786

==== Assignments in ETO ====
1. 22 October 1943: Attached to First Army
2. 24 December 1943: XV Corps, but attached to First Army
3. 14 April 1944: V Corps, First Army
4. 1 August 1944: V Corps, First Army, 12th Army Group
5. 17 August 1944: XIX Corps
6. 18 August 1944: VIII Corps, Third Army, 12th Army Group
7. 5 September 1944: VIII Corps, Ninth Army, 12th Army Group
8. 22 October 1944: VIII Corps, First Army, 12th Army Group
9. 11 December 1944: V Corps
10. 20 December 1944: Attached, with the entire First Army, to the British 21st Army Group
11. 18 January 1945: V Corps, First Army, 12th Army Group
12. 28 April 1945: VII Corps
13. 1 May 1945: V Corps
14. 6 May 1945: Third Army, 12th Army Group

==== Campaigns ====
- Normandy
- Northern France
- Rhineland
- Ardennes-Alsace
- Central Europe
- Days of combat: 303

==== Awards and decorations ====
- Medals of Honor: 6
- Distinguished Service Crosses: 34
- Distinguished Service Medals: 1
- Silver Stars: 741
- Legions of Merit: 25
- Soldier's Medals: 14
- Bronze Stars: 5,530
- Air Medals: 89
- Distinguished Unit Citations: 16

=== Korean War ===
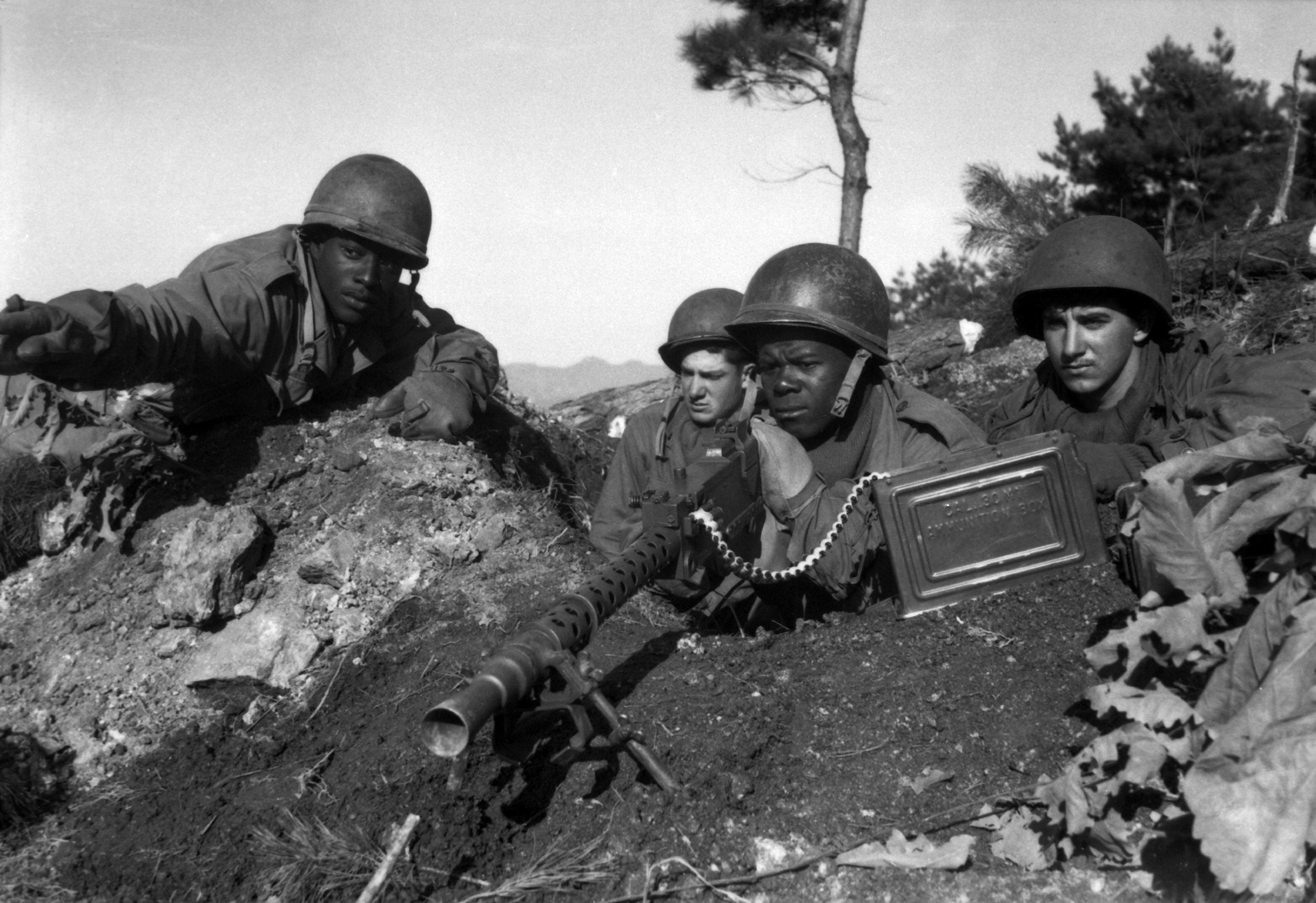
2nd Infantry Division soldiers in action during the Battle of the Ch'ongch'on River in late November 1950

With the outbreak of hostilities in Korea on 25 June 1950, the 2nd Infantry Division was quickly alerted for movement to the Far East Command and assignment to the Eighth United States Army. The division arrived in Korea, via Pusan on 23 July, becoming the first unit to reach Korea directly from the United States. Initially employed piecemeal, the entire division was committed as a unit on 24 August 1950, relieving the 24th Infantry Division at the Naktong River Line. The first big test came when the North Korean Korean People's Army (KPA) struck in a human wave attack on the night of 31 August. In the 16-day battle that followed, the division's clerks, bandsmen, technical and supply personnel joined in the fight to defend against the attackers.

Shortly thereafter, the division was the first unit to break out of the Pusan Perimeter starting on 16 September and Eighth Army then began a general offensive northward against crumbling KPA opposition to establish contact with forces of the 7th Infantry Division driving southward from the Inchon beachhead. Major elements of the KPA were destroyed and cut off in this aggressive penetration; the link-up was effected south of Suwon on 26 September. On 23 September the division was assigned to the newly activated US IX Corps. The UN offensive was continued northwards, past Seoul, and across the 38th Parallel into North Korea on 1 October. The momentum of the attack was maintained, and the race to the North Korean capital, Pyongyang, ended on 19 October when elements of the ROK 1st Infantry Division and US 1st Cavalry Division both captured the city. The advance continued, but against unexpectedly stiffening resistance. The Chinese People's Volunteer Army (PVA) entered the war on the side of North Korea, making their first attacks in late October. The division was within 50 miles (80 km) of the Manchurian border when the PVA launched their Second Phase Offensive on 25 November. During the Battle of the Ch'ongch'on River, soldiers of the 2nd Infantry Division were given the mission of protecting the rear and right flank of the Eighth Army as it retired to the south. After this battle, while surrounded and outgunned, the division had to fight its way south through what was to become known as "The Gauntlet" - a PVA roadblock 6 miles (9.7 km) long where the 23d Infantry Regiment fired off its stock of 3,206 artillery shells within 20 minutes, a massive barrage that prevented PVA troops from following the regiment. A large number of documents, including all records from the US 2nd Infantry Division and the US 24th Infantry Regiment, were lost during the battle, and this made it difficult for historians to either analyze the events in detail or to assess the exact battle damage and losses incurred. However, it was later approximated that the US 2nd Infantry Division had suffered 4,037 casualties, and most of its artillery pieces, 40 percent of its signal equipment, 45 percent of its crew-served weapons, 30 percent of its vehicles were lost during the battle. Thus, the US 2nd Infantry Division was deemed to be crippled, Major General Laurence B. Keiser commander of 2nd Infantry Division was relieved from command by the end of the battle.

The Eighth Army ordered a complete withdrawal to the Imjin River, south of the 38th Parallel. On 1 January 1951, PVA troops attacked the Eighth Army's defensive line at the Imjin River, forcing them back 50 miles (80 km) and allowing the PVA to capture Seoul. The PVA offensive was finally blunted by the 2nd Infantry Division on 20 January at Wonju. Following the establishment of defenses south of Seoul, General Matthew B. Ridgway ordered US I, IX and X Corps to conduct a general counteroffensive against the PVA/KPA, Operation Thunderbolt. Taking up the offensive in a two-prong attack in February 1951, the division repulsed a powerful PVA counter-offensive in the epic battles of Chipyong-ni and Wonju. The UN front was saved and the general offensive continued.

In August 1951, the division was on the offensive once again, ordered to attack a series of ridges that had been designated threats to the Eighth Army's line. These actions would devolve into the battles of Bloody Ridge and Heartbreak Ridge. The division would not receive relief until October, with its infantry regiments having suffered heavy losses. The 23d Infantry Regiment bore the brunt of the damage, having been severely mauled on Heartbreak Ridge. The 2nd Division was withdrawn after possessing both Bloody and Heartbreak Ridges, and the damage they inflicted upon the PVA/KPA that held the ridges was estimated at 25,000 casualties. Ridge warfare was not embarked upon again as a military strategy for the remainder of the war. In January 1953 the division was transferred from IX Corps to I Corps.

After the Korean Armistice Agreement was signed on 27 July 1953, the 2nd Infantry Division withdrew to positions south of the Korean Demilitarized Zone. Soon after the armistice, 8th United States Army commander, General Maxwell D. Taylor, appointed Brigadier General John F. R. Seitz as commander of the 2nd Infantry Division which remained on duty in Korea. Seitz commanded the division during a tense period following the armistice when both vigilance and intensive training of the Republic of Korea Army was required by the U.S. Army until the 2nd Infantry Division was redeployed to the United States in 1954.

==== Awards and decorations ====
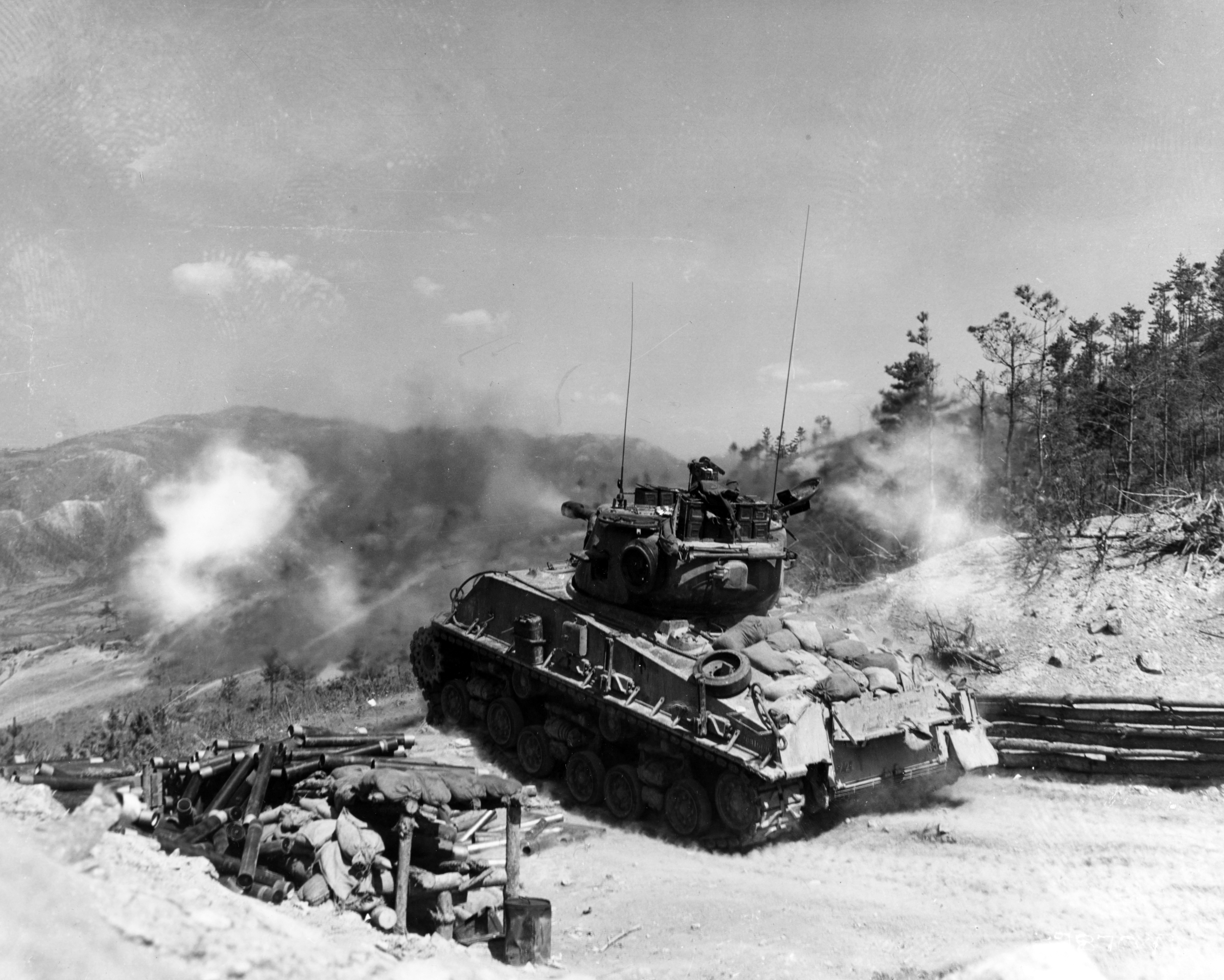
An M4 Sherman tank of the 2nd Infantry firing on enemy positions in 1952

- Medals of Honor: 18
  - 9th Infantry Regiment
    - Loren R. Kaufman (4 and 5 September 1950)
    - Edward C. Krzyzowski (31 August 1, 2 and 3 September 1951)
    - Joseph R. Ouellette (31 August 1, 2 and 3 September 1950)
    - David M. Smith (1 September 1950)
    - Luther H. Story (1 September 1950)
    - Travis E. Watkins (31 August 1, 2 and 3 September 1950)
  - 23rd Infantry Regiment
    - Junior D. Edwards (2 January 1951)
    - Hubert L. Lee (1 February 1951)
    - Herbert K. Pililaau (17 September 1951)
    - John A. Pittman (26 November 1950)
    - William S. Sitman (14 February 1951)
  - 38th Infantry Regiment
    - Tony K. Burris (8 and 9 October 1951)
    - Frederick F. Henry (1 September 1950)
    - Charles R. Long (12 February 1951)
    - Ronald E. Rosser (12 January 1952)
  - 15th Field Artillery Battalion
    - Lee R. Hartell (27 August 1951)
  - 2nd Reconnaissance Company
    - Charles W. Turner (1 September 1950)
  - A Company, 72nd Tank Bn
    - MSG Ernest R. Kouma (1 September 1950)

=== Reorganization ===
After the armistice, the division remained in Korea until 1954, when it was reduced to near zero strength, the colors were transferred to Fort Lewis, Washington, Georgia and, in October 1954, the 44th Infantry Division was reflagged as the Second.

In September 1956, the division deployed to Alaska, with the division headquarters at Fort Richardson, as part of an Operation Gyroscope deployment (soldiers and families, no equipment), switching places with the 71st Infantry Division (which was reflagged as the 4th Infantry Division upon its arrival at Fort Lewis).

On 8 November 1957, it was announced that the division was to be inactivated. However, in the spring of 1958, it was announced that the division would be reorganizing at Fort Benning. Two infantry battle groups remained in Alaska as separate units: the 1st Battle Group, 9th Infantry Regiment and the 1st Battle Group, 23rd Infantry Regiment). They were eventually reorganized in 1963 as infantry battalions, the 4-9 Infantry and the 4-23 Infantry assigned to the 171st and 172nd Infantry Brigades, respectively.

In June 1958, the division was reorganized at Fort Benning, Georgia, as a Pentomic Division, having reflagged the 10th Infantry Division upon the latter's return from Germany. The division's three infantry regiments (the 9th, 23rd and 38th) were inactivated, with their elements reorganized into five infantry battle groups (the 2nd Battle Group, 1st Infantry (2-1 INF); 2-9 INF; 1-11 INF; 2-23 INF; and the 1-87 INF). Initially serving as a training division, it was designated as a Strategic Army Corps formation in March 1962.

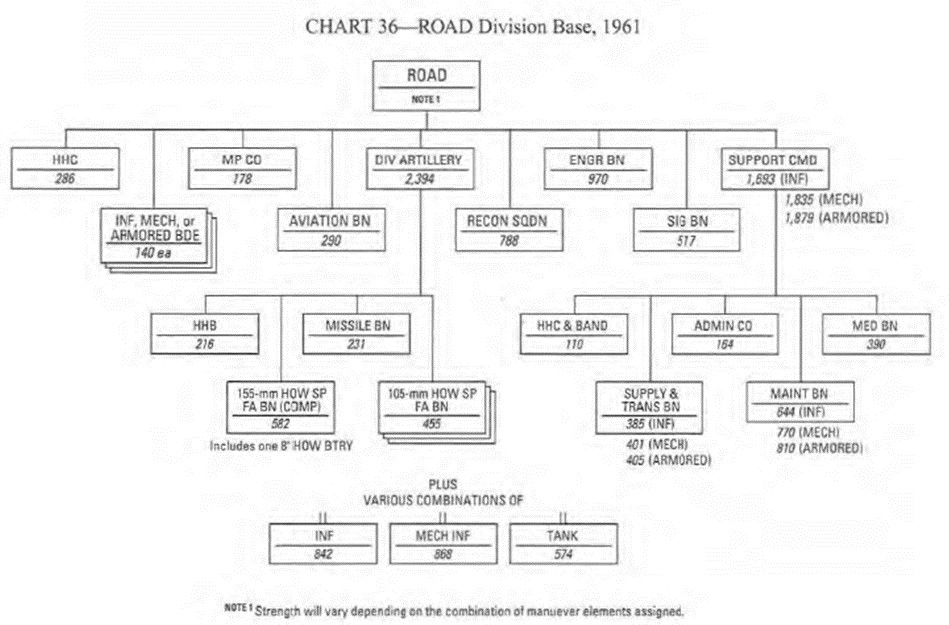
Standard organization chart for a ROAD division

In 1963, the division was reorganized as a Reorganization Objective Army Division (ROAD). Three Brigade Headquarters were activated and Infantry units were reorganized into battalions.

Like with other army units such as the 7th Infantry Division, the division did not see action in the Vietnam War.

=== Back to South Korea ===
In 1965 at Fort Benning, Georgia, the 2nd Infantry Division's stateside units, the 11th Air Assault Division's personnel and equipment, and the colors and unit designations of the 1st Cavalry Division, returned from South Korea, were used to form a new formation, the 1st Cavalry Division (Airmobile). The personnel of the existing 1st Cavalry Division in Korea took over the unit designations of the old 2nd Infantry Division. Thus, the 2nd Infantry Division formally returned to South Korea in July 1965. From 1966 onwards North Korean forces were engaging in increasing border incursions and infiltration attempts and the 2nd Infantry Division was called upon to help halt these attacks. On 2 November 1966, soldiers of the 1st Battalion, 23d Infantry Regiment were killed in an ambush by North Korean forces. In 1967 enemy attacks in the Korean Demilitarized Zone (DMZ) increased, as a result, 16 U.S. soldiers were killed that year.

In 1968 the 2nd Infantry Division was headquartered at Tonggu Ri and responsible for watching over a portion of the DMZ. In 1968 North Koreans continued to probe across the DMZ, and in 1969, while on patrol, four soldiers of 3d Battalion, 23d Infantry were killed. On 18 August 1976, during a routine tree-trimming operation within the DMZ, two American officers of the Joint Security Force (Joint Security Area) were axed to death in a melee with North Korean border guards called the Axe Murder Incident. On 21 August, following the deaths, the 2nd Infantry Division supported the United Nations Command in "Operation Paul Bunyan" to cut down the "Panmunjeom Tree". This effort was conducted by Task Force Brady (named after the 2nd ID Commander) in support of Task Force Vierra (named after the Joint Security Area Battalion commander).

Given the task of defending likely areas of enemy advance from the north, in 1982 the division occupied 17 camps, 27 sites, and 6 combat guard posts in strategic locations such as the Western (Kaesong-Munsan) Corridor; the Chorwon-Uijongbu Valley and other areas.

An aviation brigade, the Aviation Brigade, 2nd Infantry Division, was activated in September 1988.

==== Organization 1987–1993 ====
In 1987–1993 parts of the division were organized as follows:

  - Aviation Brigade, Camp Stanley
    - Headquarters & Headquarters Company
    - 5th Squadron, 17th Cavalry (Reconnaissance), Camp Garry Owen (M60A3 Patton main battle tanks & OH-58C Kiowa helicopters)
    - 1st Battalion, 2nd Aviation (Attack), Camp LaGuardia (AH-1F Cobra & OH-58C Kiowa helicopters)
    - 2nd Battalion, 2nd Aviation (General Support), Camp Stanley (UH-60A Black Hawk, UH-1H Iroquois & OH-58C Kiowa helicopters)
  - Division Artillery, Camp Stanley
    - Headquarters & Headquarters Battery
    - 1st Battalion, 4th Field Artillery, Camp Pelham (18 × M198 155 mm towed howitzers; up-gunning to 24 × M198)
    - 8th Battalion, 8th Field Artillery, Camp Stanley (18 × M198 155 mm towed howitzers; switching to 24 × M109A3 155 mm self-propelled howitzers)
    - 1st Battalion, 15th Field Artillery, Camp Stanley (18 × M109A3 155 mm self-propelled howitzers; up-gunning to 24 × M109A3)
    - 6th Battalion, 37th Field Artillery, Camp Essayons (12 × M110A2 203 mm self-propelled howitzers & 9 × M270 MLRS)
    - Battery F, 26th Field Artillery, Camp Stanley (Target Acquisition)
    - Battery B, 6th Battalion, 32nd Field Artillery, Camp Mercer (attached Eighth Army unit with 2x MGM-52 Lance with W70-3 nuclear warheads)
    - Battery C, 94th Field Artillery, Camp Stanley (9 × M270 MLRS)
  - Division Support Command, Camp Casey
    - Headquarters & Headquarters Company
    - 2nd Medical Battalion
    - 2nd Supply & Transportation Battalion, Camp Casey
    - 296th Support Battalion (Forward), Camp Edwards (activated 16 October 1989, first of the new support battalions (Forward), which were raised to replace the units of the Division Support Command)
    - 702nd Maintenance Battalion, Camp Casey
    - Company C, 2nd Aviation (Aviation Intermediate Maintenance), Camp Stanley
  - 5th Battalion, 5th Air Defense Artillery, Camp Pelham (MIM-72 Chaparral, M163 Vulcan & FIM-92 Stinger)
  - 2nd Engineer Battalion, Camp Castle
  - 122nd Signal Battalion, Camp Casey
  - 102nd Military Intelligence Battalion, Camp Hovey
  - 2nd Military Police Company, Camp Casey
  - 4th Chemical Company, Camp Casey
  - 2nd Infantry Division Band, Camp Casey
  - 44th Engineer Battalion, Camp Howze

=== Recent times in Korea ===
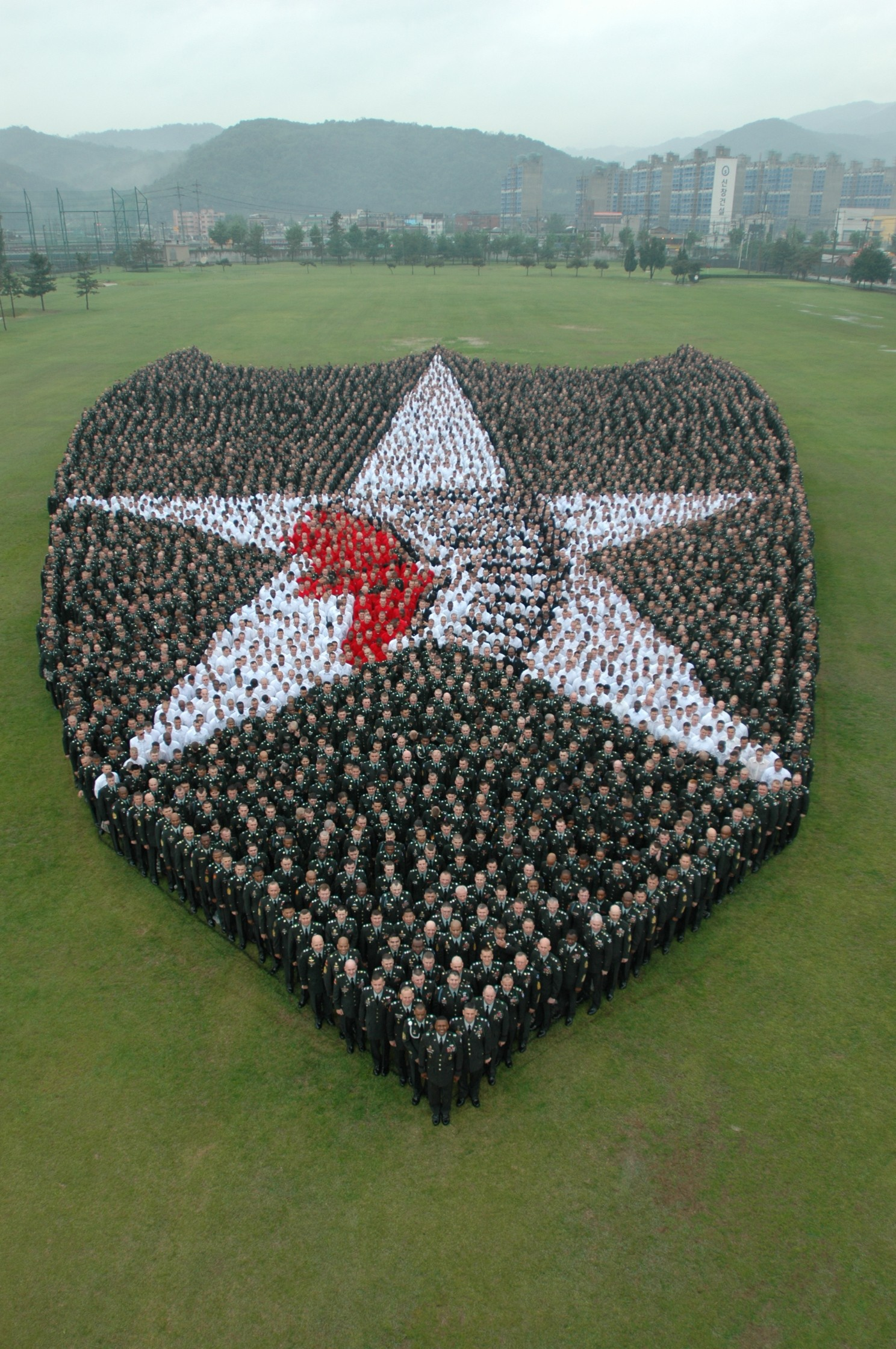
5,000 Warriors created a human version of the division's distinctive Indianhead patch at Indianhead Stage Field on Camp Casey, Korea on 22 May 2009

On 13 June 2002, a 2ID armored vehicle struck and killed two 14-year-old South Korean schoolgirls on the Yangju highway as the vehicle was returning to base in Uijeongbu after training maneuvers. Sergeants Mark Walker and Fernando Nino, the two soldiers involved, were found not guilty of negligent homicide in a subsequent General Court-martial. The deaths and court-martial were the subject of anti-American sentiment in South Korea; the two girls are annually memorialized near US military bases in South Korea to this day.

The 2nd Infantry Division is in South Korea, with a number of camps near the DMZ. Command headquarters are located at Camp Humphreys in Pyeongtaek-si, some 40 miles south of Seoul.

=== Iraq War ===
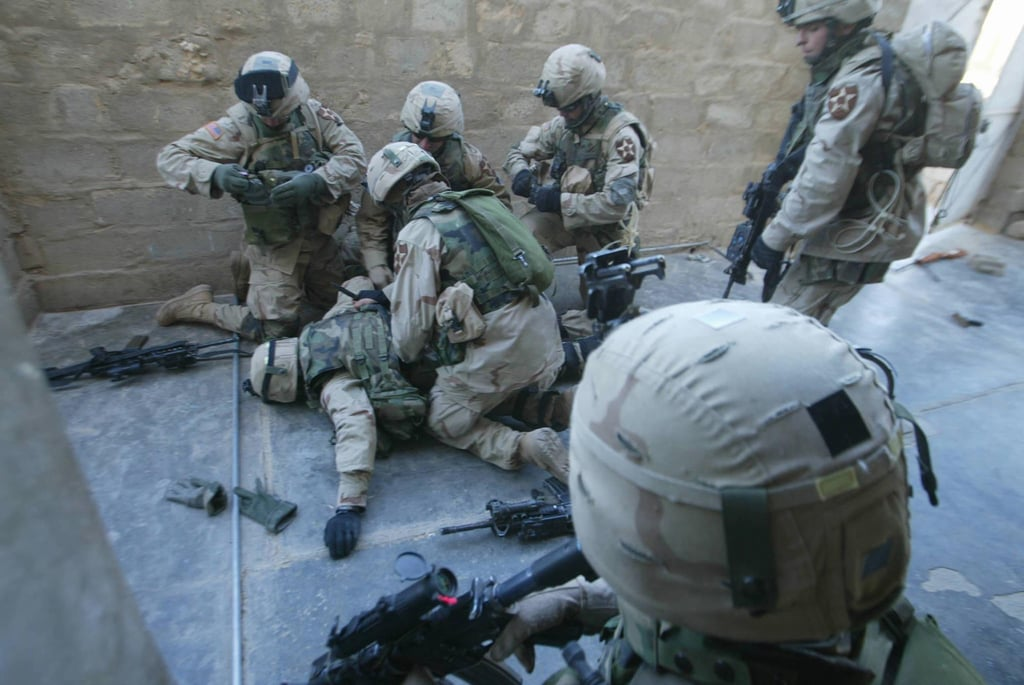
Injured 2ID soldier treated for injuries in Ramadi

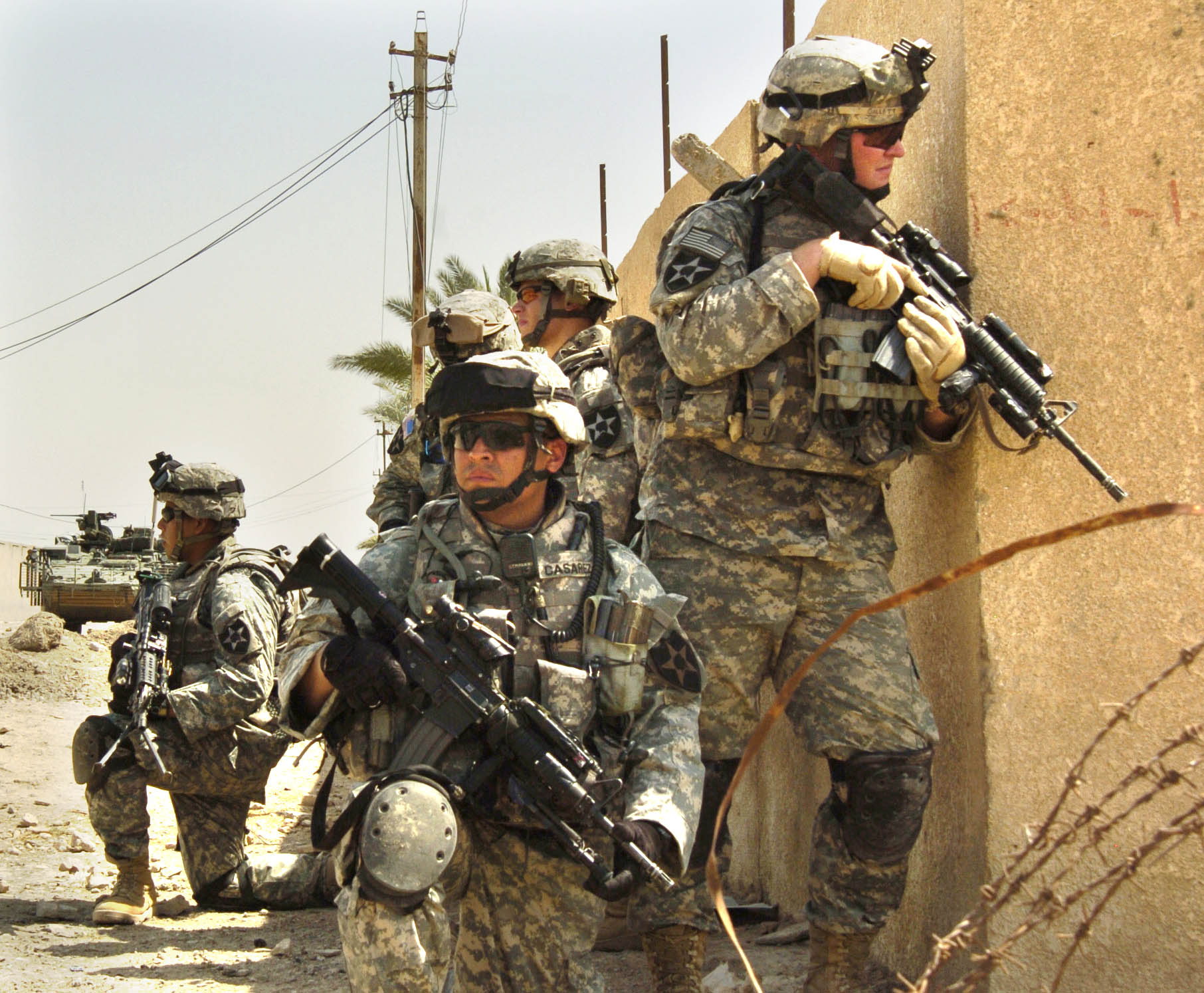
2ID soldiers reconnoitering Baghdad in 2006.

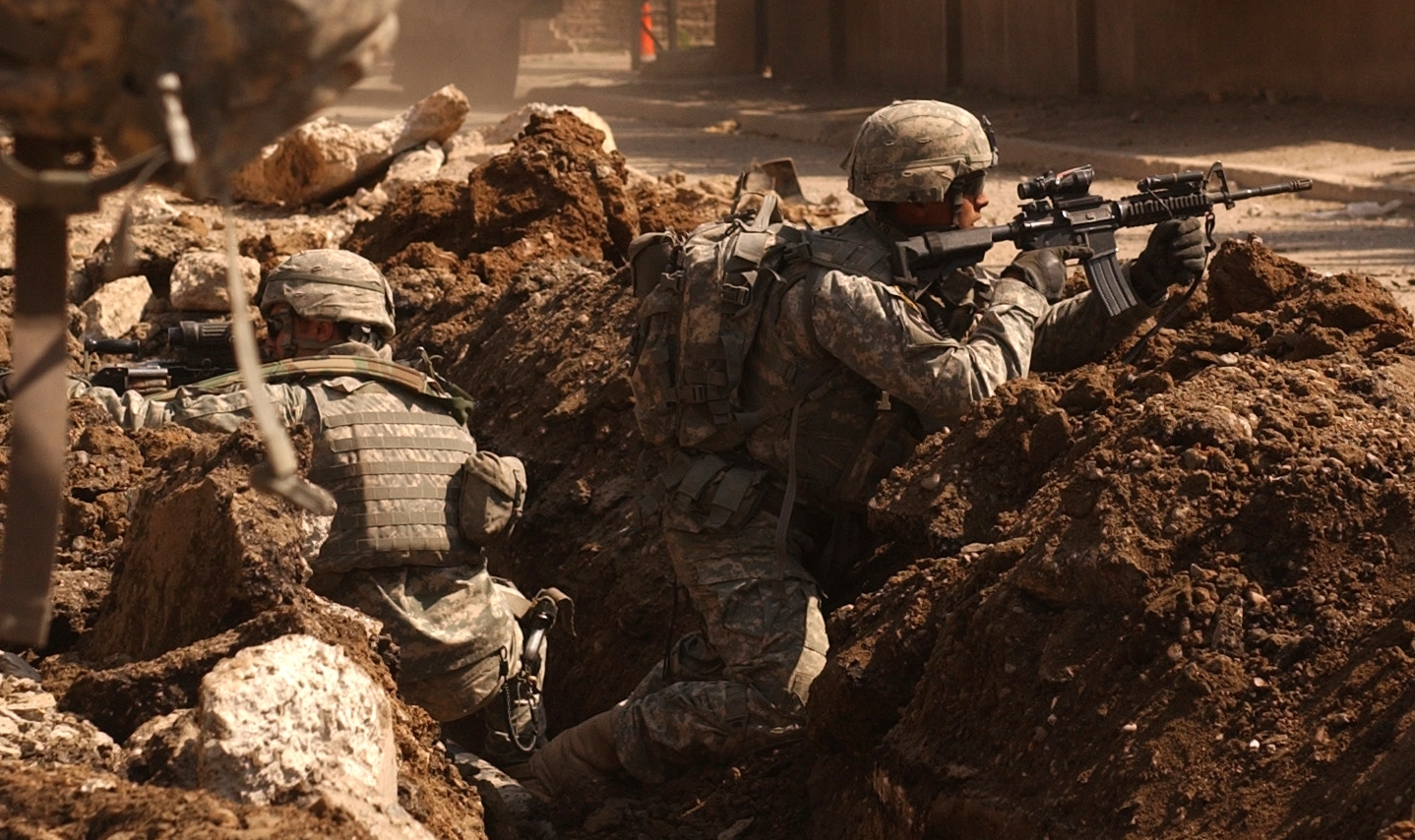
U.S. soldiers take cover during a firefight with insurgents in the neighborhood of Dora, Baghdad, Iraq in March 2007

From November 2003 to November 2004, the 3d Stryker Brigade Combat Team deployed from Fort Lewis, Washington in support of Operation Iraqi Freedom. In the sands of Iraq the 3d Brigade Stryker Brigade Combat Team proved the value of the Stryker brigade concept in combat and logistics operations.

During the late spring of 2004, many of the soldiers of the 2nd Infantry Division's 2nd Brigade Combat Team were given notice that they were about to be ordered to further deployment, with duty in Iraq. Units involved in this call-up included: 1st Battalion, 503rd Infantry Regiment; 1st Battalion, 506th Infantry Regiment (Air Assault); 2nd Battalion, 17th Field Artillery Regiment; 1st Battalion, 9th Infantry Regiment (Mechanized); 44th Engineer Battalion; 2nd Forward Support Battalion; Company A, 102nd Military Intelligence Battalion; Company B, 122nd Signal Battalion, elements of the 2nd Battalion, 72nd Armor Regiment, a team from the 509th Personnel Services Battalion, and B Battery, 5th Battalion 5th Air Defense Artillery Regiment (Deployed as a combination of mechanized infantry and light infantry with two platoons of Bradley Fighting Vehicles and 1 platoon of armored HMMWVs). As a result of the short notice, extensive training was conducted by the brigade as they switched from a focus of the foreign defense of South Korea to the offensive operations that were going to be needed in Iraq. Furthermore, time was given for the majority of the soldiers to enjoy ten days of leave. This was vital: many of the soldiers had been in South Korea for a year or more with only two weeks or less time in the United States during their stay of duty. More, they were about to depart on a deployment scheduled to last at least another year. Finally, in August 2004, the brigade deployed to Iraq.

Upon landing in country, the 2nd BCT was given strategic command to much of the sparsely populated area south and west of Fallujah. Their mission, however, changed when the major strategic actions began to take place within the city proper. At this time, the brigade combat team was refocused and given control of the eastern half of the volatile city of Ar-Ramadi. Within a few weeks of taking over operational control from the previous units, 2nd Brigade began suffering casualties from violent activity. Many of the units had to move to new camps in support of this new mission. The primary focus of the 2nd BCT for much of their deployment was the struggle to gain local support and to minimize casualties.

The brigade was spread out amongst many camps. To the west of the city of Ar-Ramadi sat the camp of Junction City. 2ID units stationed there included: HQ 2nd BCT, 2nd ID; 2–17th Field Artillery; 1–9th Infantry; 44th Engineer Battalion; Company A, 102nd Military Intelligence Battalion; Company B, 122nd Signal Battalion, and Company C (Medical), 2nd Forward Support Battalion. To the eastern end of the city sat a much more austere camp, known as the Combat Outpost. This was home to the 1-503d Infantry Regiment. East of them but outside of the city proper itself was the town of Habbiniya and the 1–506th Infantry Regiment. Adjacent to this camp was the logistically important camp of Al-Taqaddum, where the 2nd Forward Support Battalion was stationed.

For this mission, the brigade fell under the direct command not of the 2nd Infantry Division, but rather under a Marine division. For the first six months while in Ramadi, the BCT fell under the 1st Marine Division. For the second half of the deployment, they were attached to the 2nd Marine Division. While the Marines do not wear unit patches on their uniforms, the units of the 2nd BCT involved are authorized to now wear any of the following combat patches: the 2nd Infantry Division patch, the 1st Marine Division unit patch or the 2nd Marine Division unit patch.

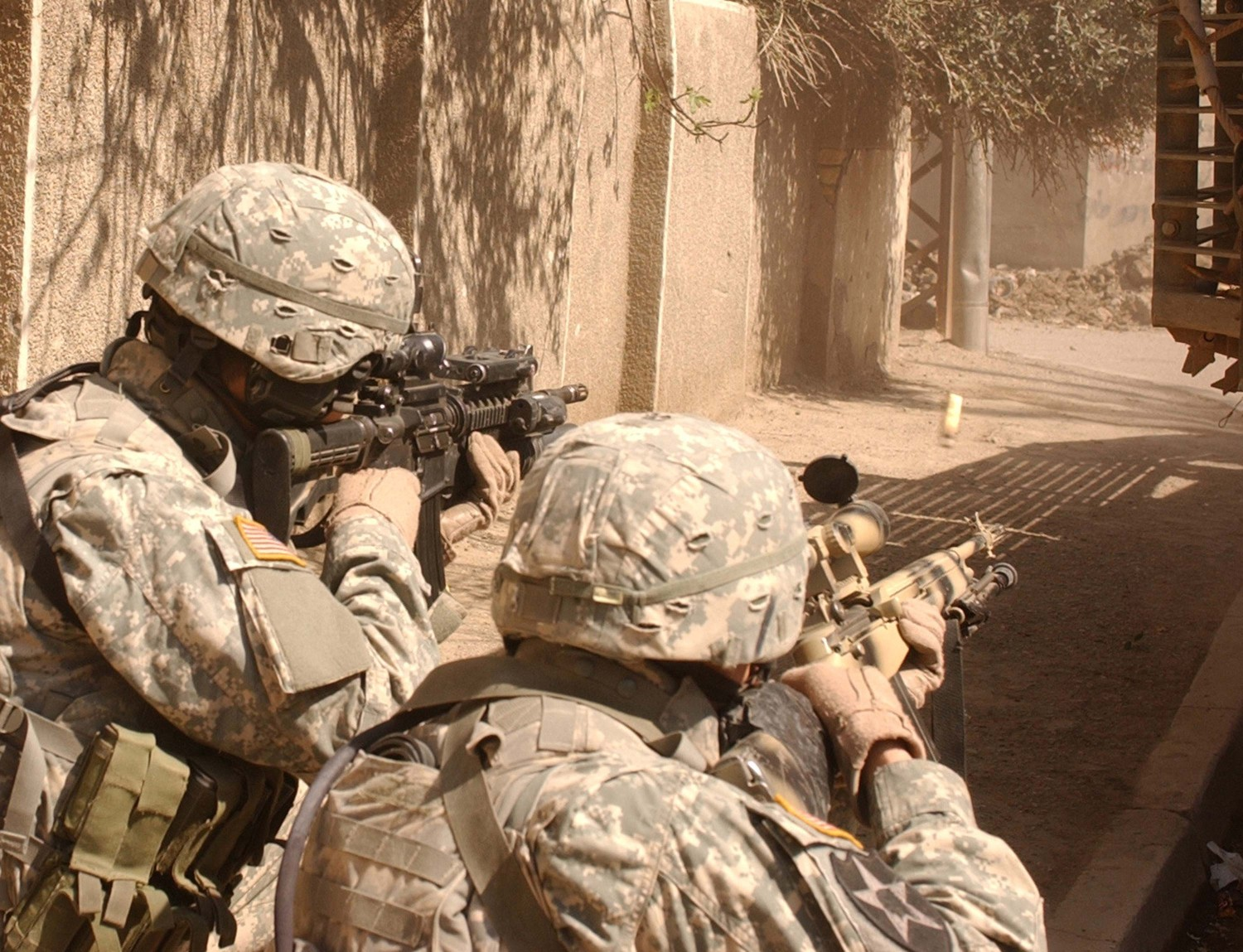
SGT Karl King and PFC David Valenzuela lay down cover fire behind the cover of a Stryker vehicle while their squad maneuvers down a street in Al Doura, Iraq, on 7 March 2007. The soldiers are from Company C, 5th Battalion, 20th Infantry Regiment, 3rd BCT, 2nd Infantry Division.

The 2nd Brigade Combat Team was in action in the city of Ramadi for many events, including the Iraqi national elections of January 2005. While the voting was accomplished and little to no violence was seen within the city, few voters participated (estimated to be in the 700 person range for the eastern half of the city, according to 2nd BCT officials).

The 2nd BCT also built several new camps within the city. For security reasons, many are left unverified, however ones that can be confirmed include Camps Trotter and Corregidor built to ease the burden on the accommodations at Combat Outpost.

In July 2005, the brigade began to get relieved by units of the Army National Guard, as well as the 3d Infantry Division of the Regular Army. Six months into the deployment, the units of the 2nd BCT were given word that they would not be returning to South Korea but, rather, to Fort Carson, Colorado in an effort to restructure the Army and house more soldiers on American soil.

From June 2006 to September 2007, the 3d Stryker Brigade Combat Team deployed from Fort Lewis, Washington in support of Operation Iraqi Freedom. During the 3d Stryker Brigade's second deployment to Operation Iraqi Freedom their mission was to assist the Iraqi security forces with counter-insurgency operations in the Ninewa Province. 46 soldiers from the brigade were killed during the deployment.

On 1 June 2006 at Fort Lewis, Washington the 4th Brigade, 2nd Infantry Division was formed. From April 2007 to July 2008 the 4th Stryker Brigade Combat Team was deployed in as part of the surge to regain control of the situation in Iraq. The brigade assumed responsibility for the area north of Baghdad and the Diyala province. 35 soldiers from the brigade were killed during the deployment.

From October 2006 to January 2008, the 2nd Infantry Brigade Combat Team deployed from Fort Carson, Colorado in support of the Multi-National Division – Baghdad (1st Cavalry Division) and was responsible for assisting the Iraqi forces to become self-reliant, bringing down the violence and insurgency levels and supporting the rebuilding of the Iraqi infrastructure. 43 soldiers from the brigade were killed during the deployment.

SSG Christopher B. Waiters of 5th Battalion, 20th Infantry Regiment, 3d Brigade Combat Team was awarded the Distinguished Service Cross on 23 October 2008 for his actions on 5 April 2007 when he was a specialist. Shortly after, SPC Erik Oropeza of the 4th Battalion, 9th Infantry Regiment, 4th Brigade Combat Team Thus the division will be credited with the 17th and 18th Distinguished Service Cross awardings since 1975.

The 2nd Infantry Division's 4th Brigade Combat Team deployed to Iraq in the fall of 2009.

3d Brigade deployed to Iraq 4 August 2009 for the brigade's third deployment to Iraq, the most of any Stryker Brigade Combat Team (SBCT).

=== War in Afghanistan ===
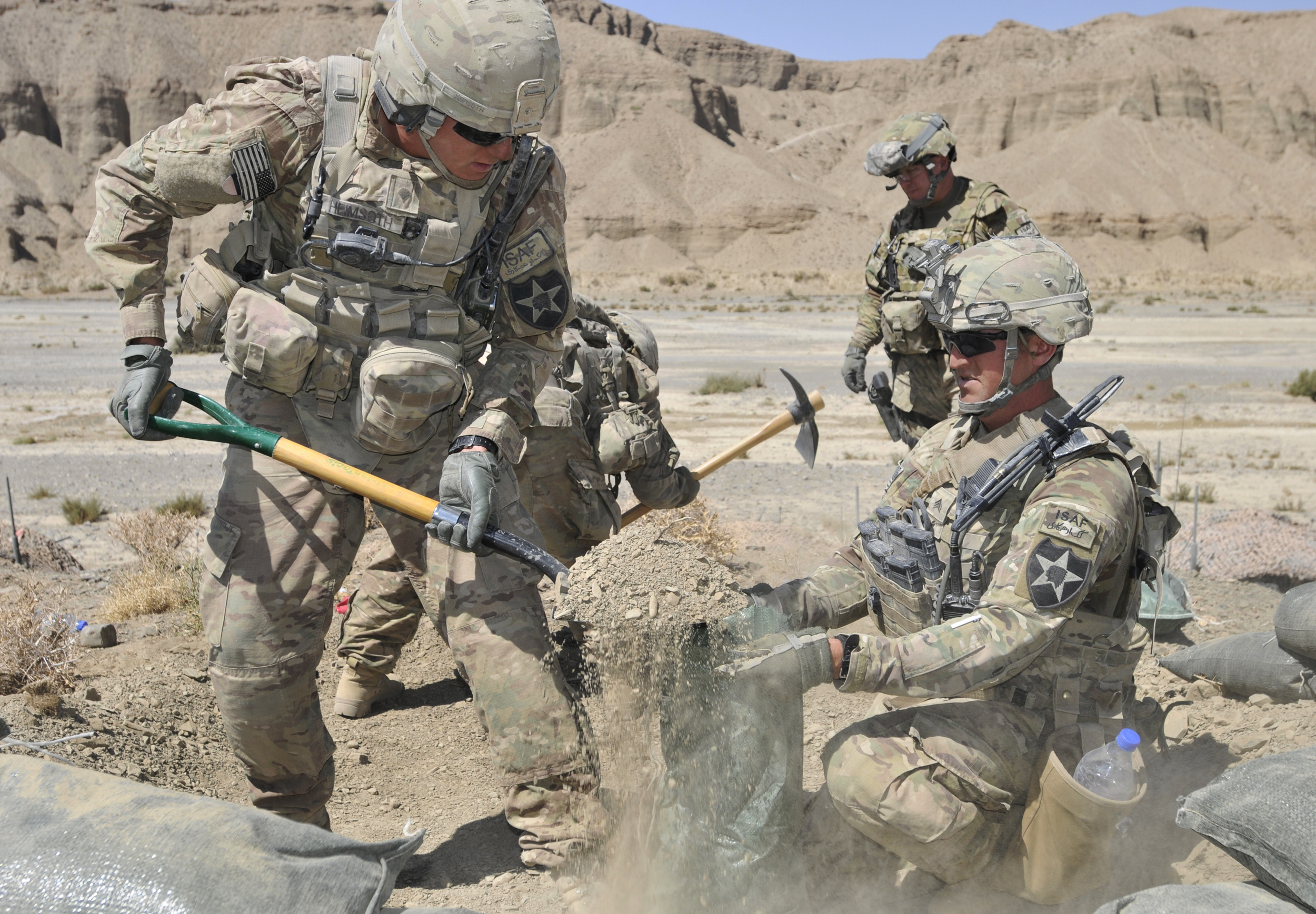
Spc. Justin Heimsoth (left) and Sgt. Chris Hagen fill sandbags for a machine gun position during Operation Southern Fist in Afghanistan's Spin Boldak district, 29 Sept. 2012. Both soldiers are infantrymen with the 2nd Infantry Division's 5th Battalion, 20th Infantry Regiment.

On 17 February 2009, President Barack Obama ordered 4,000 soldiers from the 5th Stryker Brigade Combat Team to Afghanistan, along with 8,000 Marines. Soldiers are being sent there because of the worsening situation in the Afghan War. These soldiers were deployed in the southeast, on the Afghanistan-Pakistan border. During deployment, 35 soldiers were killed in combat, two others were killed in accidents, and 239 were wounded. In July 2010, the 5th Stryker Brigade Combat Team was inactivated and reflagged as the 2nd Stryker Brigade Combat Team. The brigade's Special Troops Battalion was also inactivated and reflagged and the rest of the subordinate units were reassigned to the reactivated 2nd SBCT.

3d SBCT deployed in December 2011 and served in Afghanistan for one-year. 16 soldiers from the brigade died during the deployment. They were joined by their sister Stryker brigade, the 2nd SBCT, in the spring. 2nd Brigade returned around December 2012 and January 2013 having lost eight soldiers during deployment. The 4th Stryker BCT also deployed to its first deployment to the country in fall 2012 and returned in summer 2013 having lost four soldiers.

==== Rogue "kill team" criminal charges ====
During the summer of 2010, the U.S. military charged five members of the 3d Platoon, Bravo Company, 2nd Battalion, 1st Infantry Regiment with the formation of a "kill team", which staged three separate murders of Afghan civilians in Kandahar province. In addition, seven soldiers were also charged with crimes including hashish use, impeding an investigation and attacking a whistleblowing soldier who alerted MPs during an initially unrelated investigation into hashish use by members of the 3rd Platoon. The alleged ringleader was Staff Sergeant Calvin Gibbs.

- On 15 January 2010, Gul Mudin was killed "by means of throwing a fragmentary grenade at him and shooting him with a rifle," an action carried out by SPC Jeremy Morlock and PFC Andrew Holmes under the direction of Gibbs. Morlock allegedly told Holmes, age 19 and on his first tour of duty, that the killing was carried out for fun.
- On 22 February, Gibbs and SPC Michael S. Wagnon allegedly shot the second victim, Marach Agha, and placed a Kalashnikov next to the body to justify the killing.
- On 2 May, Mullah Adadhdad was killed after being shot and attacked with a grenade. SPC Adam C. Winfield and Gibbs were allegedly the perpetrators.

Christopher Winfield, the father of platoon member SPC Adam Winfield, attempted to alert the Army of the kill team's existence after his son explained the situation from Afghanistan via a Facebook chat. In response to the news from his son, Winfield called the Army inspector general's 24-hour hotline, the office of Sen. Bill Nelson (D-Fla.), and a sergeant at Joint Base Lewis-McChord who told him to call the Army Criminal Investigation Division. He then contacted the Fort Lewis command center and spoke to a sergeant on duty who agreed that SPC Winfield was in potential danger but that he had to report the crime to his superiors before the Army could take action.

=== Reorganization ===
Since the inactivation of the 1st Armored Brigade Combat Team, 2nd Infantry Division on 2 July 2015, the Brigade Combat Team requirement in Korea has been filled by rotational forces from the United States on nine-month deployments. From 2015 to 2022, but in the summer of 2022 the Army announced the Korea Rotational Force would switch from the armor to Stryker brigades. Rotational units were primarily stationed in Camp Casey until 2017 when the forces were split between Camp Casey and Camp Humphreys.

Rotational Armor Brigades under 2nd Infantry Division
Brigade	Home Station	Arrived	Departed
2nd Armored Brigade Combat Team, 1st Cavalry Division	Fort Hood, TX	June 2015	March 2016
1st Armored Brigade Combat Team, 1st Cavalry Division	Fort Hood, TX	March 2016	November 2016
1st Armored Brigade Combat Team, 1st Infantry Division	Fort Riley, KS	November 2016	July 2017
2nd Armored Brigade Combat Team, 1st Cavalry Division	Fort Hood, TX	July 2017	March 2018
1st Armored Brigade Combat Team, 3rd Infantry Division	Fort Stewart, GA	March 2018	November 2018
3rd Armored Brigade Combat Team, 1st Armored Division	Fort Bliss, TX	November 2018	July 2019
3rd Armored Brigade Combat Team, 1st Cavalry Division	Fort Hood, TX	July 2019	March 2020
2nd Armored Brigade Combat Team, 1st Infantry Division	Fort Riley, KS	March 2020	December 2020
1st Armored Brigade Combat Team, 3rd Infantry Division	Fort Stewart, GA	December 2020	August 2021
3rd Armored Brigade Combat Team, 1st Armored Division	Fort Bliss, TX	August 2021	February 2022
1st Armored Brigade Combat Team, 1st Armored Division	Fort Bliss, TX	February 2022	October 2022

Rotational Stryker Brigades under 2nd Infantry Division
Brigade	Home Station	Arrived	Departed
2nd Stryker Brigade Combat Team, 2nd Infantry Division (Attached to 7th Infantry Division)	Joint Base Lewis-McCord, WA	October 2022	July 2023
2nd Stryker Brigade Combat Team, 4th Infantry Division	Fort Carson, CO	June 2023	February 2024
3rd Cavalry Regiment	Fort Cavazos, TX	February 2024	October 2024
1st Stryker Brigade Combat Team, 7th Infantry Division	Joint Base Lewis-McCord, WA	October 2024	June 2025
1st Stryker Brigade Combat Team, 4th Infantry Division	Fort Carson, CO	June 2025	TBA

Previously, the 7th Infantry Division had peacetime supervision of two Stryker brigades of the 2nd Infantry Division while they were garrisoned at Joint Base Lewis-McChord in Washington State. But under the Army's restructuring in 2024, the two brigades were formally transferred to the 7th ID.

Their previous two brigades, 1st Stryker Brigade Combat Team "Ghost Brigade" and 2nd Stryker Brigade Combat Team "Lancer Brigade" were reflagged under 7th Infantry Division.

== Locations ==
- Camp Humphreys (Division Command) – near Pyeongtaek-si City, South of Seoul
  - Camp Casey – Dongducheon City, 45 miles north of Seoul; 17 miles south of DMZ
  - Camp Hovey – adjacent to Camp Casey
  - Camp Castle (former) – near Camp Casey
  - Camp Mobile – adjacent to Camp Casey
  - Camp Stanley (former) – East of Uijeongbu
  - Camp Carroll - Daegu
  - Fort Lewis – Tacoma, Washington
  - K-16 - South Korea near USAG Yongsan
  - Camp Red Cloud (former) - Uijeongbu

== Division organization ==
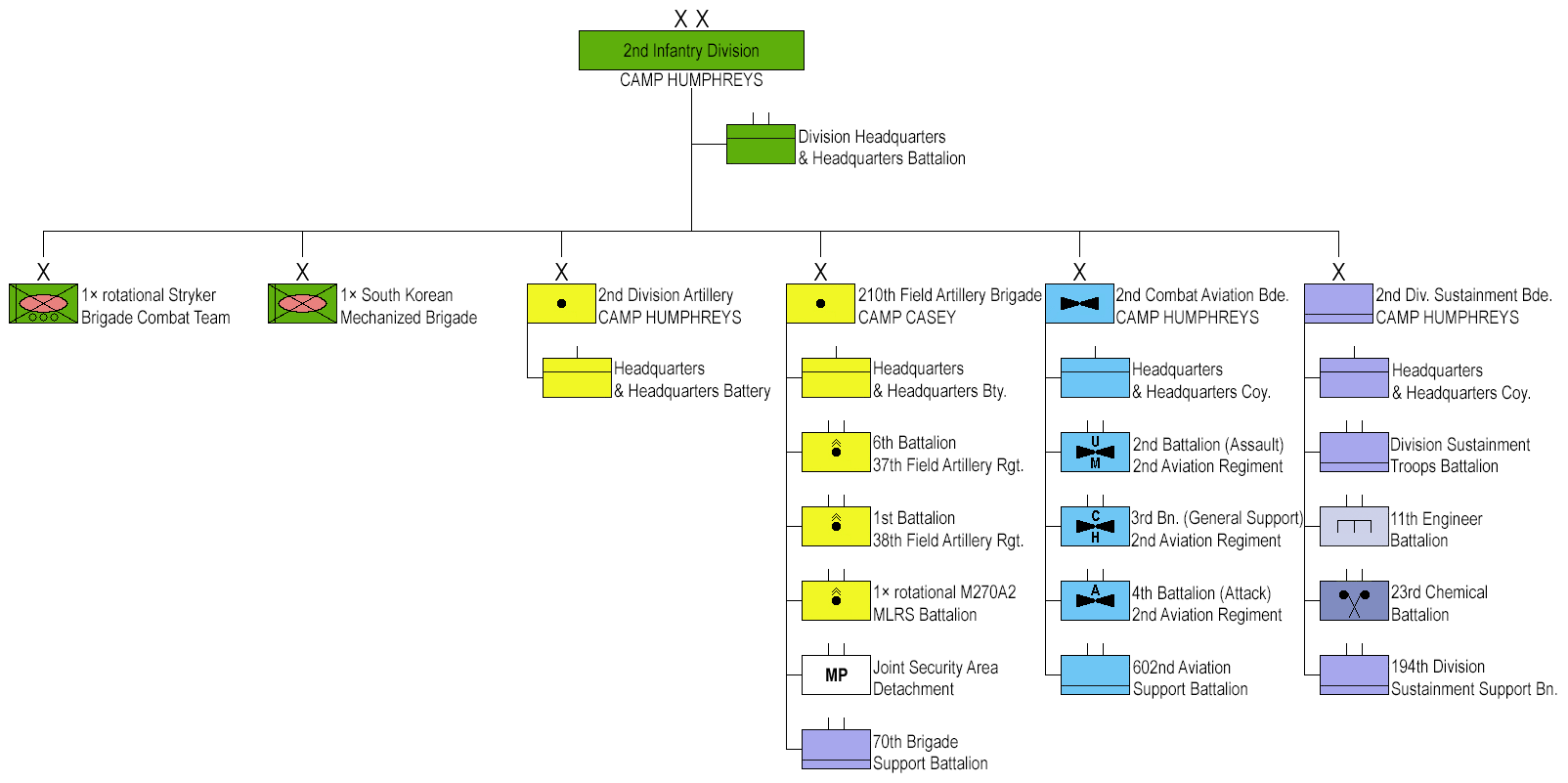
2nd Infantry Division organization in South Korea June 2026

Since 2024, the 2nd Infantry Division does no longer have any organic Brigade Combat Teams.

The 2nd Infantry Division retained the 2nd Combat Aviation Brigade, the 2nd Division Sustainment Brigade, 2nd Division Artillery, and the 210th Field Artillery Brigade as well as control over the Korean Rotational Force (KRF). The division also has an attached mechanized brigade from the Republic of Korea Army under the combined division concept.

- 2nd Infantry Division, at Camp Humphreys
  - Division Headquarters and Headquarters Battalion, at Camp Humphreys
  - Rotational Stryker Brigade Combat Team, at Camp Hovey
  - 2nd Infantry Division Artillery, at Camp Humphreys
    - Headquarters and Headquarters Battery
  - 210th Field Artillery Brigade, at Camp Casey
    - Headquarters and Headquarters Battery
    - 6th Battalion, 37th Field Artillery Regiment (M270A1 MLRS)
    - 1st Battalion, 38th Field Artillery Regiment (M270A1 MLRS)
    - 1 × rotational MLRS Battalion from 75th Field Artillery Brigade
    - 70th Brigade Support Battalion
    - Joint Security Area Detachment
  - Combat Aviation Brigade, 2nd Infantry Division "Talon Brigade", at Camp Humphreys
    - Headquarters and Headquarters Company, "Warrior Knights"
    - 2nd Battalion (Assault), 2nd Aviation Regiment "Wild Card" (UH-60 Black Hawk)
    - 3rd Battalion (General Support), 2nd Aviation Regiment "Nightmare" (UH-60 Black Hawk, CH-47F Chinook, UH-60A+)
    - 4th Battalion (Attack), 2nd Aviation Regiment "Death Dealer" (AH-64E Apache)
    - 602nd Aviation Support Battalion "Warhorse"
  - 2nd Infantry Division Sustainment Brigade, at Camp Humphreys
    - Headquarters and Headquarters Company
    - Division Sustainment Troops Battalion
    - 194th Division Sustainment Support Battalion
    - 11th Engineer Battalion
    - 23rd Chemical Battalion

== Lineage and honors ==
=== Division ===
- Constituted 21 September 1917 in the Regular Army as Headquarters, 2nd Division
- Organized 26 October 1917 in France
- Constituted 12 November 1917 in the Regular Army as Headquarters, 2nd Field Artillery Brigade, and assigned to the 2nd Division
- Partially organized in October 1917 at Governors Island, New York, and assigned to the 2nd Division (later redesignated as the 2nd Infantry Division); organization completed 1 January 1918 in France
- Disbanded 7 October 1939 at Fort Sam Houston, Texas
- Reconstituted 10 September 1940 in the Regular Army as Headquarters and Headquarters Battery, 2nd Division Artillery
- Activated 1 October 1940 at Fort Sam Houston, Texas
- Redesignated 1 August 1942 as Headquarters, 2nd Infantry Division
- Reflagged from 44th Infantry Division at Fort Lewis, Washington and 44th Infantry returned to Army National Guard.
- Reorganized and redesignated 14 June 1958 as Headquarters and Headquarters Battery, 2nd Infantry Division Artillery
- Reorganized and redesignated 2 May 1960 as Headquarters and Headquarters Company, 2nd Infantry Division
- Reorganized and redesignated 1 6 June 2005 as Headquarters and Tactical Command Posts, 2nd Infantry Division
- Reorganizedand redesignated 16 May 2010 as Headquarters and Headquarters Battalion, 2nd Infantry Division

==== Campaign participation credit ====
World War I

- Aisne
- Champagne-Marne
- Aisne-Marne
- Saint-Mihiel
- Meuse-Argonne
- Lorraine 1918

World War II

- Northern France
- Rhineland
- Ardennes-Alsace
- Central Europe

Korean War

- CCF Intervention
- First UN Counteroffensive
- CCF Spring Offensive
- UN Summer-Fall Offensive
- Second Korean Winter
- Korea, Summer-Fall 1952
- Third Korean Winter
- Korea, Summer 1953

==== Decorations ====
Ribbon	Award	Year	Notes
Dark blue ribbon with a gold border	Presidential Unit Citation (Army)	1950	Streamer embroidered HONGCHON
Red ribbon	French Croix de guerre with Palm	1918	Streamer embroidered AISNE-MARNE
Red ribbon with vertical green stripes in the center and a palm leaf in the middle	French Croix de guerre with Palm	1918	Streamer embroidered MEUSE-ARGONNE
Red and Green woven citation cord with brass tip	French Fourragère in the colors of the Croix de guerre	1918	Fourragère
	Belgian Fourragere	1940	Fourragère
	Cited in the Order of the Day of the Belgian Army	1945	For action at ARDENNES
	Cited in the Order of the Day of the Belgian Army	1945	For action at ELSENBORN CREST
White ribbon with vertical green and red stripes on its edges and a red and blue circle in the middle	Presidential Unit Citation (Korea)	1950	Streamer embroidered NAKTONG RIVER
White ribbon with vertical green and red stripes on its edges and a red and blue circle in the middle	Presidential Unit Citation (Korea)	1950–1953	Streamer embroidered KOREA 1950–1953

== See also ==
- Awards and decorations of the United States Armed Forces
- List of commanders of 2nd Infantry Division (United States)
- Rhino tank

== Sources ==
- "Maps Locating Army Active, Reserve and National Guard and Marine Field Artillery Units". Field Artillery (PB 6-87-6 (TEST)). US Field Artillery Association: 32–36. December 1987. ISSN 0191-975X.
- "Eighth Army in Korea-Continuing a Tradition". Soldier Support Journal. 9 (3). US Army Soldier Support Center: 12–16. May–June 1982. ISSN 0274-9513. Article contributed by the Public Affairs Office, Headquarters, US Forces, Korea.

== Bibliography ==
- Clark, George B. (2007). The Second Infantry Division in World War I: A History of the American Expeditionary Force Regulars, 1917-1919. McFarland & Company. ISBN 978-0786429608.
