= Combat Aviation Brigade, 2d Infantry Division =

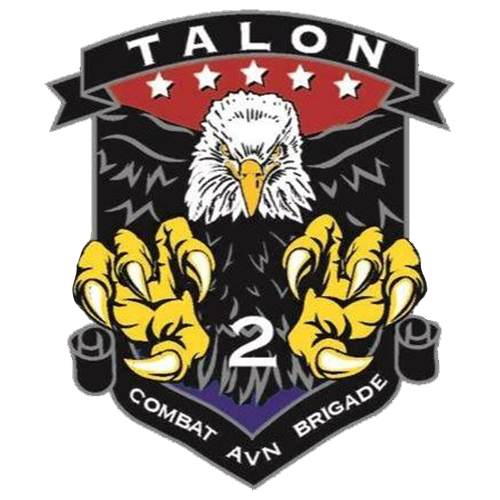
- Unit Insignia of the Combat Aviation Brigade, 2d Infantry Division
- Active: 1988 – present
- Country: United States
- Type: Aviation
- Size: Brigade
- Part of: 2d Infantry Division
- Garrison/HQ: Camp Humphreys
- Nickname: Talon

Commanders
- Current commander: Colonel Jason Raub
- Notable commanders: William D. Taylor

The Combat Aviation Brigade, 2d Infantry Division is a Combat Aviation Brigade of the United States Army based at Camp Humphreys in the Republic of Korea. Although informally referred to as the 2d Combat Aviation Brigade, its official designation is Combat Aviation Brigade, 2d Infantry Division.

The headquarters was constituted on 16 September 1988 in the Regular Army as Headquarters and Headquarters Company, Aviation Brigade, 2nd Infantry Division, and activated in Korea.

As of July/August 1993, the brigade included:

- Headquarters & Headquarters Company, Camp Stanley
- 5th Squadron, 17th Cavalry (Reconnaissance), Camp Garry Owen (M60A3 Patton main battle tanks & OH-58C Kiowa helicopters)
- 1st Battalion, 2nd Aviation (Attack), Camp LaGuardia (AH-1F Cobra & OH-58C Kiowa helicopters)
- 2nd Battalion, 2nd Aviation (General Support), Camp Stanley (UH-60A Black Hawk, UH-1H Iroquois & OH-58C Kiowa helicopters)

The brigade was awarded the Army Superior Unit Award for 2013.

The HHC was reorganized and redesignated 16 June 2005 as Headquarters and Headquarters Company, Combat Aviation Brigade, 2nd Infantry Division.

In 2022 5th Squadron, 17th Cavalry, was reactivated in Korea with the AH-64 Apache attack helicopter. The unit was deactivated on 12 December, 2025.

== Structure in 2026 ==
- 2d Battalion (Assault), 2d Aviation Regiment
- 3d Battalion (General Support), 2d Aviation Regiment
- 4th Battalion (Attack Reconnaissance), 2d Aviation Regiment
- 602nd Aviation Support Battalion
