= 210th Field Artillery Brigade =

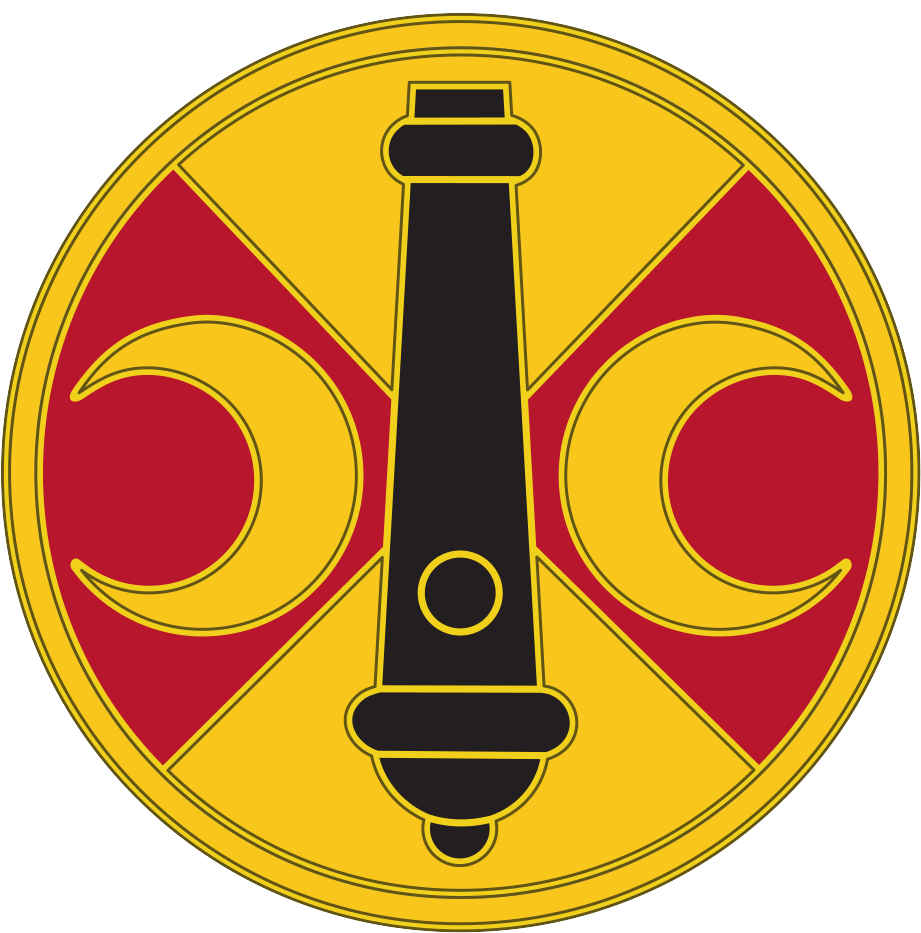
- Active: 4 January 1944 – 26 January 1946; 15 October 1958 – 15 April 1996; 30 November 2006 – present
- Country: United States
- Branch: United States Army
- Type: Field artillery
- Role: Force Fires Headquarters
- Size: Brigade
- Part of: 2nd Infantry Division
- Garrison/HQ: Camp Casey, Republic of Korea
- Nickname: Thunder
- Engagements: (1) World War II: Rhineland; Central Europe (2) Southwest Asia: Defense of Saudi Arabia; Liberation and Defense of Kuwait; Cease Fire

Commanders
- Current commander: Col. David O'Leary
- Notable commanders: LT. Gen. Jerome H. Granrud, 1982–1984

Insignia
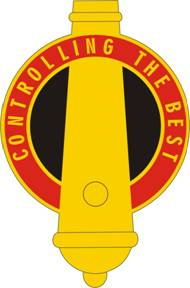
- Distinctive Unit Insignia

The 210th Field Artillery Brigade, also known as "the Thunder", is a U.S. Army field artillery brigade forward deployed in the Republic of Korea. Its mission is "On order, 210th Field Artillery Brigade provides fires in support of ACC Operations and Ground Component Commander's (GCC's) counter fire fight. On order, transitions to offensive operations." It provides fire support for Eighth United States Army. The brigade is based at Camp Casey, Republic of Korea and its assets include the M270A1 Multiple Launch Rocket System (MLRS).

== History ==
The 210th Field Artillery Brigade was constituted on 4 January 1944 in the Army of the United States as Headquarters and Headquarters Battery, 210th Field Artillery Group. It was activated on 24 January 1944 at Camp Maxey, Texas and following the end of World War II, it was inactivated on 26 January 1946 at Camp Kilmer, New Jersey.

The unit was redesignated on 17 September 1958 as Headquarters and Headquarters Battery, 210th Artillery Group, and allotted to the Regular Army. On 15 October 1958, it was activated in Germany as part of the VII Corps Artillery and stationed in Ansbach, Germany. In 1971, the unit headquarters moved to Herzo Base in Herzogenaurach, Germany. On 15 March 1972, the unit was redesignated as Headquarters and Headquarters Battery, 210th Field Artillery Group, then redesignated again on 16 September 1980 as Headquarters and Headquarters Battery, 210th Field Artillery Brigade.

At various times during its years in Germany, the 210th used 155mm and 8-in howitzers; 175mm and 280mm guns; Corporal, Sergeant, Honest John, and Lance missiles; and the M270 Multiple Launch Rocket System. At various times, the battalions assigned included the 3rd Battalion, 5th Field Artillery; 3rd and 5th Battalions, 17th Field Artillery; 2nd Battalion, 28th Field Artillery; 1st Battalion, 33rd Field Artillery; 1st Battalion, 36th Field Artillery; 3rd Battalion, 37th Field Artillery; 3rd Battalion, 39th Field Artillery; 1st Battalion, 68th Field Artillery; 1st Battalion, 75th Field Artillery; 1st Battalion, 80th Field Artillery, 2nd Battalion, 377th Field Artillery and 2nd Battalion, 12th Field Artillery Regiment.

In December 1990, the brigade deployed from Germany to Saudi Arabia as part of Operation Desert Shield. The brigade was direct support to the 2nd Armored Cavalry Regiment until 26 February 1991, when it began to provide fire support to the 1st Infantry Division. The brigade was redeployed to Germany in May 1991. After the war, the entire brigade, including the brigade headquarters and headquarters battery, received the Valorous Unit Award.

In January 1992, the brigade moved from Germany to Fort Lewis, Washington, assuming control of the 3rd Battalion, 11th Field Artillery. At that time, the unit maintained a 'string' relationship with the XVIII Airborne Corps as rapidly deployable artillery to the Pacific theatre. The 210th Field Artillery Brigade was then inactivated on 15 April 1996. For further information on the 210th in Germany, follow this link.

On 30 November 2006, the 210th was reactivated as Headquarters and Headquarters Battery, 210th Fires Brigade in Korea by reflagging the existing HHB, 2nd Infantry Division Artillery.

== Subordinate Units ==
- 210th Field Artillery Brigade (210th FAB)
  - Headquarters and Headquarters Battery (HHB), 210th Field Artillery Brigade (210th FAB)
  - 6th Battalion, 37th Field Artillery Regiment (6-37th FAR) (MLRS) Multiple Launch Rocket System
    - 579th Forward Support Company (579th FSC)
  - 1st Battalion, 38th Field Artillery Regiment (1-38th FAR) (MLRS) Multiple Launch Rocket System
    - 580th Forward Support Company (580th FSC)
  - 70th Brigade Support Battalion (70th BSB)
    - 579th Signal Company
  - Rotational MLRS Battalion from 75th Field Artillery Brigade
  - Joint Security Area Detachment

== Lineage and honors ==
=== Lineage ===
- Constituted 4 January 1944 in the Army of the United States as Headquarters and Headquarters Battery, 210th Field Artillery Group
- Activated 24 January 1944 at Camp Maxey, Texas
- Inactivated 26 January 1946 at Camp Kilmer, New Jersey
- Redesignated 17 September 1958 as Headquarters and Headquarters Battery, 210th Artillery Group, and allotted to the Regular Army
- Activated 15 October 1958 in Germany
- Redesignated 15 March 1972 as Headquarters and Headquarters Battery, 210th Field Artillery Group
- Redesignated 16 September 1980 as Headquarters and Headquarters Battery, 210th Field Artillery Brigade
- Inactivated 15 April 1996 at Fort Lewis, Washington
- Redesignated 30 November 2006 as Headquarters and Headquarters Battery, 210th Fires Brigade and activated in Korea

=== Campaign participation credit ===
- World War II: Rhineland; Central Europe
- Southwest Asia: Defense of Saudi Arabia; Liberation and Defense of Kuwait; Cease Fire

=== Decorations ===
- Valorous Unit Award for IRAQ 1991
- 2x superior unit awards
