= Camp Castle =

Camp Castle may refer to:

- Camp Castle (Cyprus)
- Camp Castle (South Korea)
