= 122nd Signal Battalion =

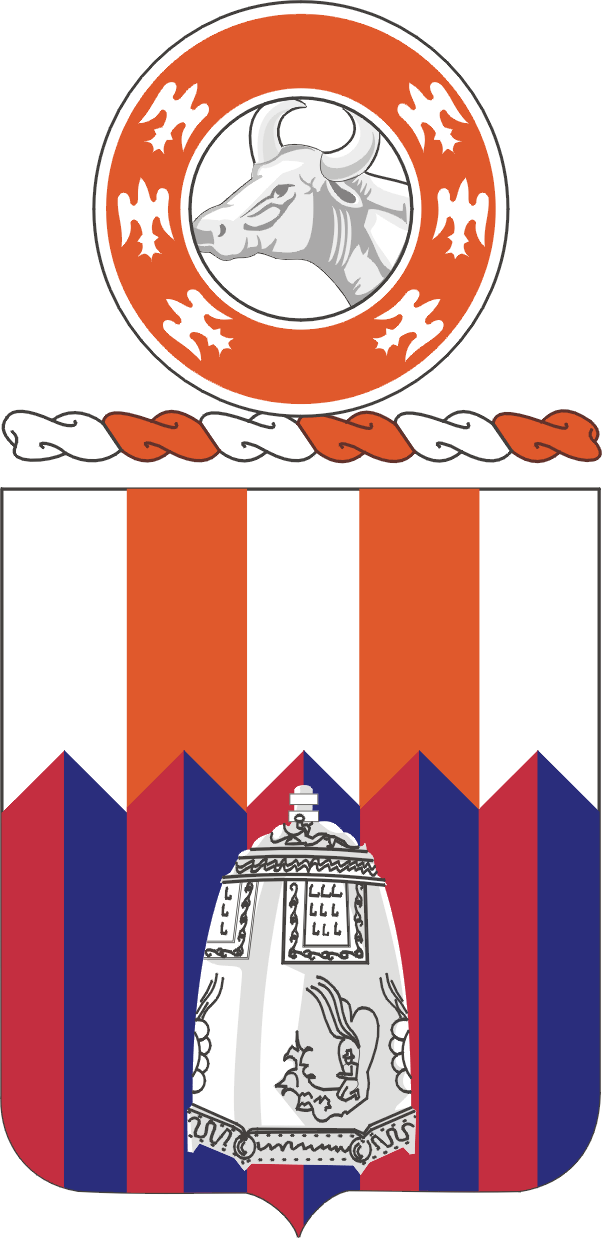
Coat of arms and/or unit crest for the 122nd Signal Battalion.

The 122nd Signal Battalion was constituted 1 July 1916 in the United States Regular Army, then organized to Fort Bliss in Texas on 10 October 1916. On 21 September 1917, the unit was assigned to the 2nd Infantry Division.

== Campaign participation credit ==
- Philippine Insurrection: San Isidro
- World War I: Aisne; Aisne-Marne; St. Mihiel; Meuse-Argonne; Lorraine 1918; Ile de France 1918
- World War II: Normandy; Northern France; Rhineland; Ardennes-Alsace; Central Europe
- Korean War: UN Defensive; UN Offensive; CCF Intervention; First UN Counteroffensive; CCF Spring Offensive; UN Summer-Fall Offensive; Second Korean Winter; Korea, Summer-Fall 1952; Third Korean Winter; Korea, Summer 1953

== Decorations ==
- Presidential Unit Citation (Army) for WIRTZFELD, BELGIUM
- Presidential Unit Citation (Army) for HONGCHON
- Meritorious Unit Commendation (Army) for EUROPEAN THEATER
- Meritorious Unit Commendation (Army) for KOREA 1950-1951
- French Croix de Guerre with Palm, World War I for AISNE-MARNE
- French Croix de Guerre with Palm, World War I for MEUSE-ARGONNE
- French Croix de Guerre, World War I, Fourragere
- Belgian Fourragere 1940
- Cited in the Order of the Day of the Belgian Army for action in the Ardennes
- Cited in the Order of the Day of the Belgian Army for action on Elsenborn Crest
- Republic of Korea Presidential Unit Citation for NAKTONG RIVER LINE
- Republic of Korea Presidential Unit Citation for KOREA 1950-1953
