= 2nd Aviation Regiment (United States) =

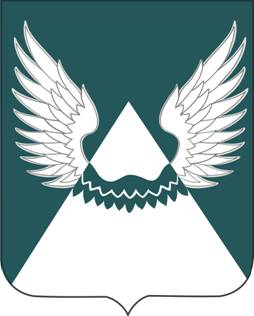
- Coat of Arms of the 2nd Aviation Regiment
- Active: 1957–present
- Country: United States
- Branch: Aviation
- Type: Aviation
- Part of: 2nd Infantry Division
- Motto: Excelsus (Lofty)
- Colors: Ultramarine Blue, Golden orange

Insignia
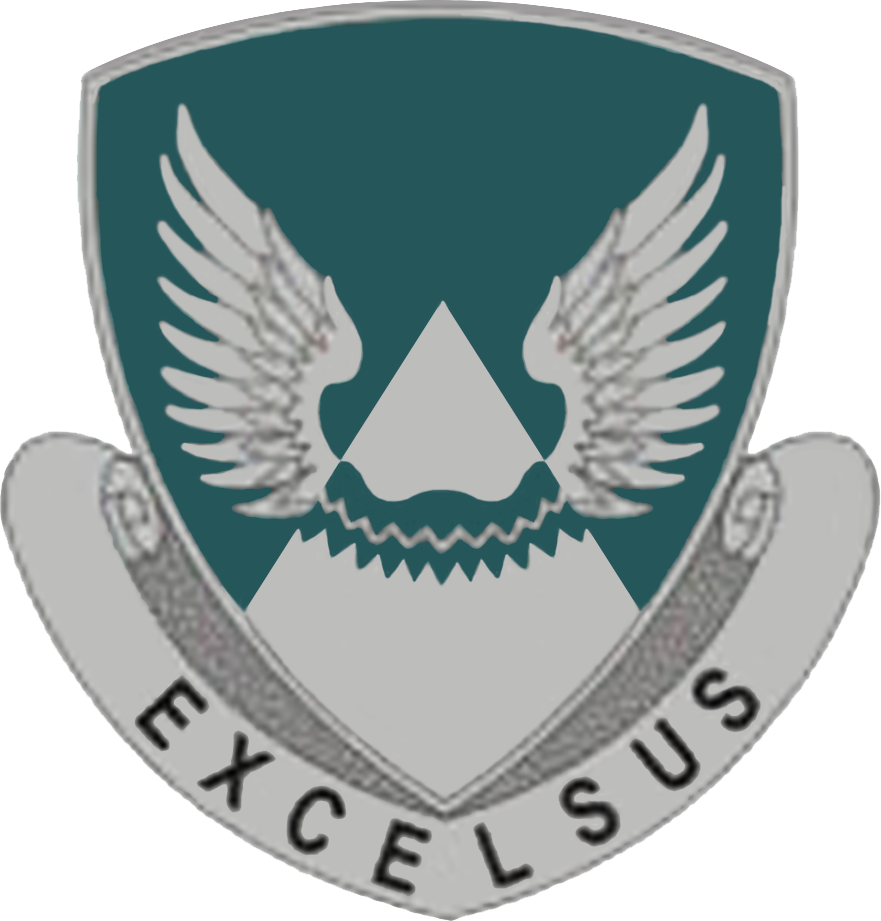
- Distinctive Unit Insignia

Aircraft flown
- Attack helicopter: AH-64D Apache
- Cargo helicopter: CH-47F Chinook
- Multirole helicopter: UH-60L Black Hawk

The 2nd Aviation Regiment is an aviation regiment of the U.S. Army.

== History ==
The regiment was originally constituted on 24 May 1957 in the Regular Army as the 2nd Aviation Company, part of the 2nd Infantry Division. It was activated on 20 June 1957 at Fort Richardson, Alaska. On 20 February 1963, it was reorganized and redesignated as the Headquarters and Headquarters Company (HHC) of the 2nd Aviation Battalion. The battalion's organic elements were constituted on 25 January 1963 and activated on 20 February of that year. On 16 September 1988, the battalion was redesignated as the HHC of the Combat Aviation Brigade, 2nd Infantry Division.

1st Battalion, 2nd Aviation Regiment (Attack) was stationed at Camp LaGuardia in Uijongbu, Korea from 1989 to 1993. The "Attack Deep" Battalion was composed of one headquarters company (HHC), three flight companies (A, B, C), and one Aviation Unit Maintenance (AVUM) company (D). The Battalion's aircraft consisted of three UH-60As, 21 AH-1Fs, and 12 OH-58A/Cs. 1-2 AVN REGT Then obtained 24 AH-64A Apaches in the early 1990s. Along with 6 Kiowa Warrior 0H-58A/C Kiowa Scouts. In the late 1990s, Early 2000s, The unit transferred their Apaches and Kiowas to the Army National Guard. Their motto was, "STRIKE DEEP." The unit then went to Ft. Hood Texas during the year 2000 to undergo Unit Training Program (UTP) under III Corp, 21st Cavalry Brigade. It obtained 24 AH-64D Longbow Apaches. After graduating UTP, 1-2 AVN REGT boat loaded all 24 aircraft at Galveston, TX. Deploying during the September 11th, 2001 attacks on the United States. Arriving in Pusan, South Korea Sept. 17th, 2001, The unit then reassembled their Apaches and were stationed at Camp Page, Chuncheon, South Korea. The unit was there until the year 2003, when they transferred to Camp Eagle, Wonju Enclave, South Korea. 1-2 AVN Regt Strike Deep, then was redesignated 4-2 AVN Death Dealers, and transferred to Camp Humphreys, Pyongtaek, South Korea.

2nd Battalion was constituted 25 January 1963 in the Regular Army as Company B, 2d Aviation Battalion, an element of the 2nd Infantry Division.

On 17 October 2006, the 3rd Battalion, 2nd Aviation Regiment (General Support) was activated at Camp Humphreys, using the personnel and equipment of the inactivated 2nd Battalion, 52nd Aviation Regiment.

== Heraldry ==
The distinctive unit insignia and coat of arms of the regiment were originally approved for the 2d Aviation Battalion on 5 August 1963. They were redesignated for the 2d Aviation Regiment and amended to update the blazon and symbolism on 8 December 1988. The white peak represents Denali, near where it was activated. Teal blue was used for aviation units of the United States Army, and the wings represent the unit's aviation function.

== Current configuration ==
The following units are currently part of the regiment:

- 1st Battalion (Attack) ("Gunfighters" / "Strike Deep")
- 2nd Battalion (Assault) (UH/UL −60) – "Wild Card"
- 3rd Battalion (General Support) (CH-47F, UH/UL-60) – "Nightmare"
- 4th Battalion (Attack Reconnaissance) (AH-64D) – "Death Dealer"

== See also ==
- Coats of arms of U.S. Army Aviation Regiments
- U.S. Army Regimental System
