= 2nd Infantry Division Sustainment Brigade =

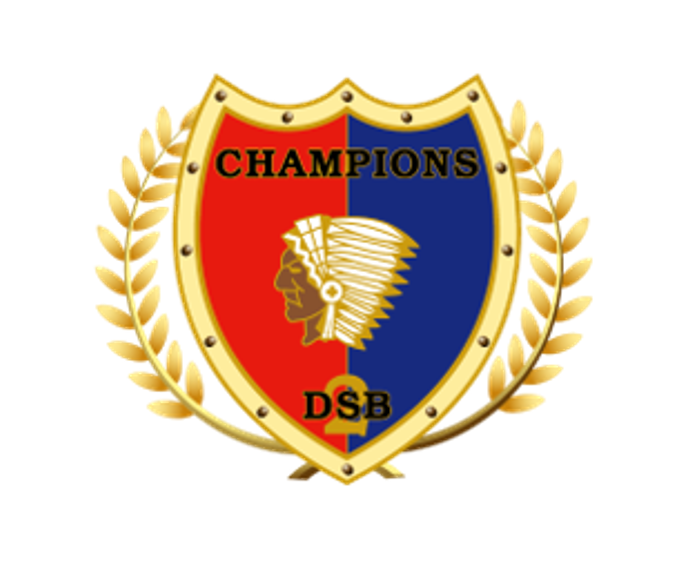
- Coat of Arms
- Active: 16 April 1986 – 7 July 2015 (as 501st); 7 July 2015 - present
- Country: United States
- Branch: United States Army
- Role: Sustainment
- Size: Brigade
- Part of: 2nd Infantry Division
- Garrison/HQ: Camp Humphreys, South Korea
- Engagements: World War II; Korean War; Vietnam

Commanders
- Commander: COL Harry Mars IV
- Command Sergeant Major: CSM Shan Willis

Insignia
- Shoulder sleeve insignia

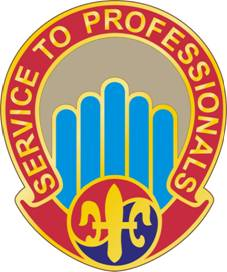
- 501st Sustainment Brigade DUI

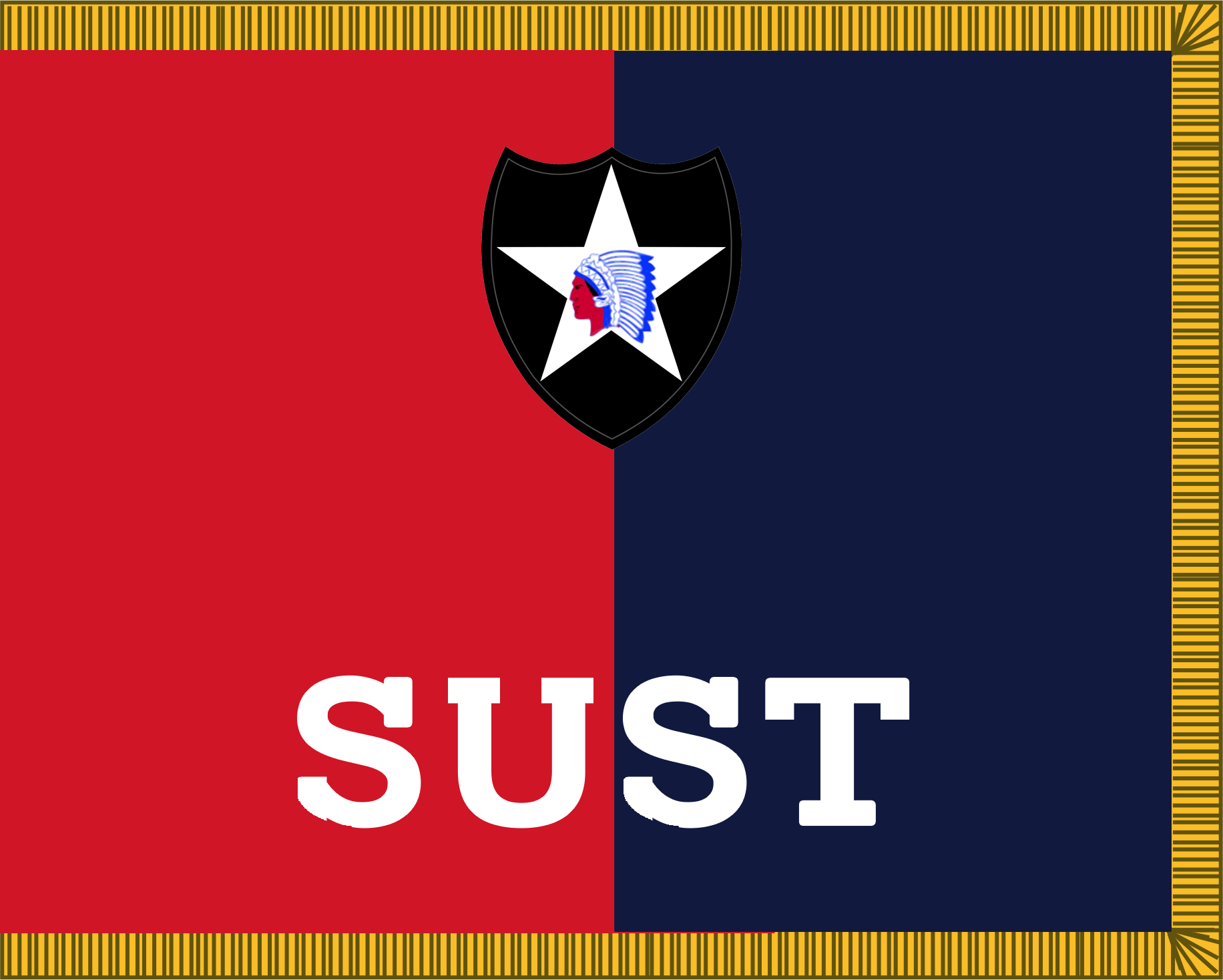
- 2nd Division Sustainment Brigade Flag

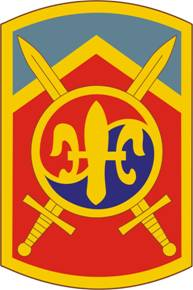
- 501st Sustainment Brigade former SSI

The 2nd Infantry Division Sustainment Brigade (2IDSB) ("Champion") is a sustainment brigade of the United States Army. It provides logistical support to the 2nd Infantry Division, the Republic of Korea Army's 8th Infantry Division, and all U.S. Army Units garrisoned on the Korean Peninsula. Formerly the 501st Sustainment Brigade, it was reflagged the 2ID SBDE on 7 July 2015 and became a direct reporting unit to the 2nd Infantry Division.

== History ==
The history of the 501st Support Group, Corps, began with the activation of the 501st Quartermaster Battalion. The battalion was activated on 29 July 1944 in England. On 28 October, the battalion was moved to France and later Germany where it earned campaign participation streamer with inscription for the European-African-Middle Eastern Theater. The 501st returned to the United States on 18 July 1945 where it was stationed at Camp Lee, Virginia.

On 20 February 1950, the 501st Quartermaster Battalion joined the Eighth United States Army in Korea. For its action in the Korean War the 501st earned a Meritorious Unit Commendation, a Republic of Korea Presidential Unit Citation, and campaign participation streamers for the second Korean Winter, Korean Summer-Fall 1952, Third Korean Winter, and Korean Summer 1953.

On 21 February 1958, the unit was inactivated in the Republic of Korea. It was redesigned on 7 April 1966 as the 501st Field Depot and activated 1 June 1966 at Granite City Army Depot, Illinois. The 501st Field Depot performed duty with the United States Army Pacific on 8 February 1967 when it was stationed in Thailand. The 501st Field Depot was inactivated in Thailand on 20 December 1968.

On 16 April 1986 the 501st Support Group was reactivated and designated the 501st Support Group (Corps) at Yongsan, Korea. On 28 February 1991 the 501st Support Group (Corps) moved to Camp Red Cloud, Korea. On 13 October 2006 it became the 501st Sustainment Brigade and moved south to Camp Carroll, near the city of Daegu. On 17 Dec 2013 501st Sustainment Brigade was recognized as the best Sustainment Brigade in the entire Korean peninsula.

In June 2024, Col. Dwight F. Towler took command of the brigade. In Oct. 2025, Command Sgt. Maj. Shan Willis took responsibility for the brigade.

== Organization ==
- Division Sustainment Troops Battalion
  - Headquarters and Headquarters Company
  - 19th Human Resources Company
  - 229th Signal Company
  - 581st Quartermaster Company (Field Feeding)
- 194th Division Sustainment Support Battalion
  - Headquarters and Headquarters Company, 194th Division Sustainment Support Battalion
  - Alpha Company (former 348th Quartermaster Company)
  - Bravo Company (former 520th Maintenance Company)
  - Charlie Company (former 46th Composite Truck Company)
  - 61st Maintenance Company
- 11th Engineer Battalion
  - Headquarters and Headquarters Company, 11th Engineer Battalion
  - Forward Support Company, 11th Engineer Battalion
  - 55th Engineer Company (Mobility Augmentation Company)
  - 630th Engineer Company (Clearance)
  - 643rd Engineer Company (Engineer Support Company)
  - 814th Engineer Company (Multirole Bridge)
- 23rd Chemical Battalion
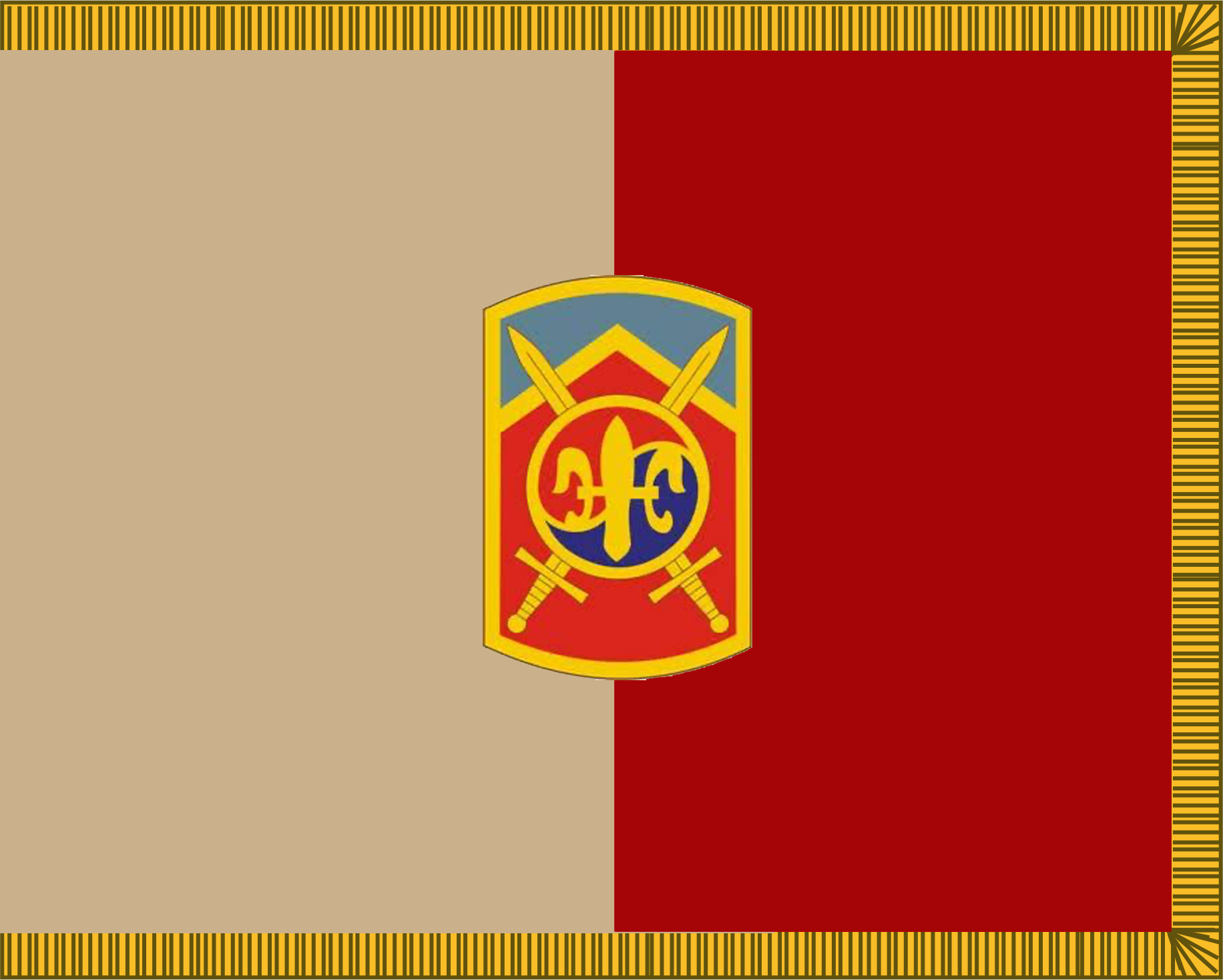
  - 501st Sustainment Brigade Flag
    Headquarters and Headquarters Company, 23rd Chemical Battalion
  - 4th CBRN Company
  - 61st CBRN Company
  - 62nd CBRN Company
  - 501st CBRN Company (Technical Escort)
  - 718th Ordnance Company (EOD)
