= 23rd Chemical Battalion =

23d CBRN Battalion
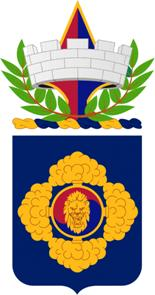
- Active: 1944–45; 1949–59; 1988 – present
- Country: United States
- Branch: United States Army
- Type: Chemical
- Size: Battalion
- Part of: 2nd Sustainment Brigade
- Engagements: World War II; Korea War; War on terror

Insignia
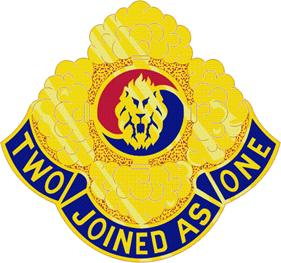
- Distinctive Unit Insignia

The 23d CBRN Battalion is a Chemical, biological, radiological, nuclear and high-yield explosives defense battalion of the United States Army, part of the 2ID Sustainment Brigade of the 2nd Infantry Division at Camp Humphreys, South Korea.

It traces its lineage back to the 1944 formation of the 23rd Chemical Smoke Generator Battalion in England during World War II. The 23rd was inactivated after the end of the war and reactivated in 1949 as the 4th Chemical Smoke Generator Battalion, serving in the Korean War before being inactivated in Germany at the end of the 1950s. The 23rd Chemical Battalion was reactivated in Korea in 1988.

== History ==
- Constituted 27 May 1944 in the Army of the United States as Headquarters and Headquarters Detachment, 23d Chemical Smoke Generator Battalion, and activated in England
- Inactivated 12 November 1945 in France
- Redesignated 18 January 1949 as Headquarters and Headquarters Detachment, 4th Chemical Smoke Generator Battalion, and allotted to the Regular Army
- Activated 1 February 1949 at the Army Chemical Center, Edgewood, Maryland
- Reorganized and redesignated 4 March 1954 as Headquarters and Headquarters Detachment, 4th Chemical Battalion
- Inactivated 15 June 1959 in Germany
- Redesignated 16 September 1988 as Headquarters and Headquarters Detachment, 23d Chemical Battalion, and activated in Korea

In a 4 April 2013 ceremony, the 23d Chemical Battalion was officially transferred back to Korea after spending eight years at Joint Base Lewis–McChord. On 16 October 2016, its headquarters and headquarters detachment was redesignated as a company.

== Composition ==
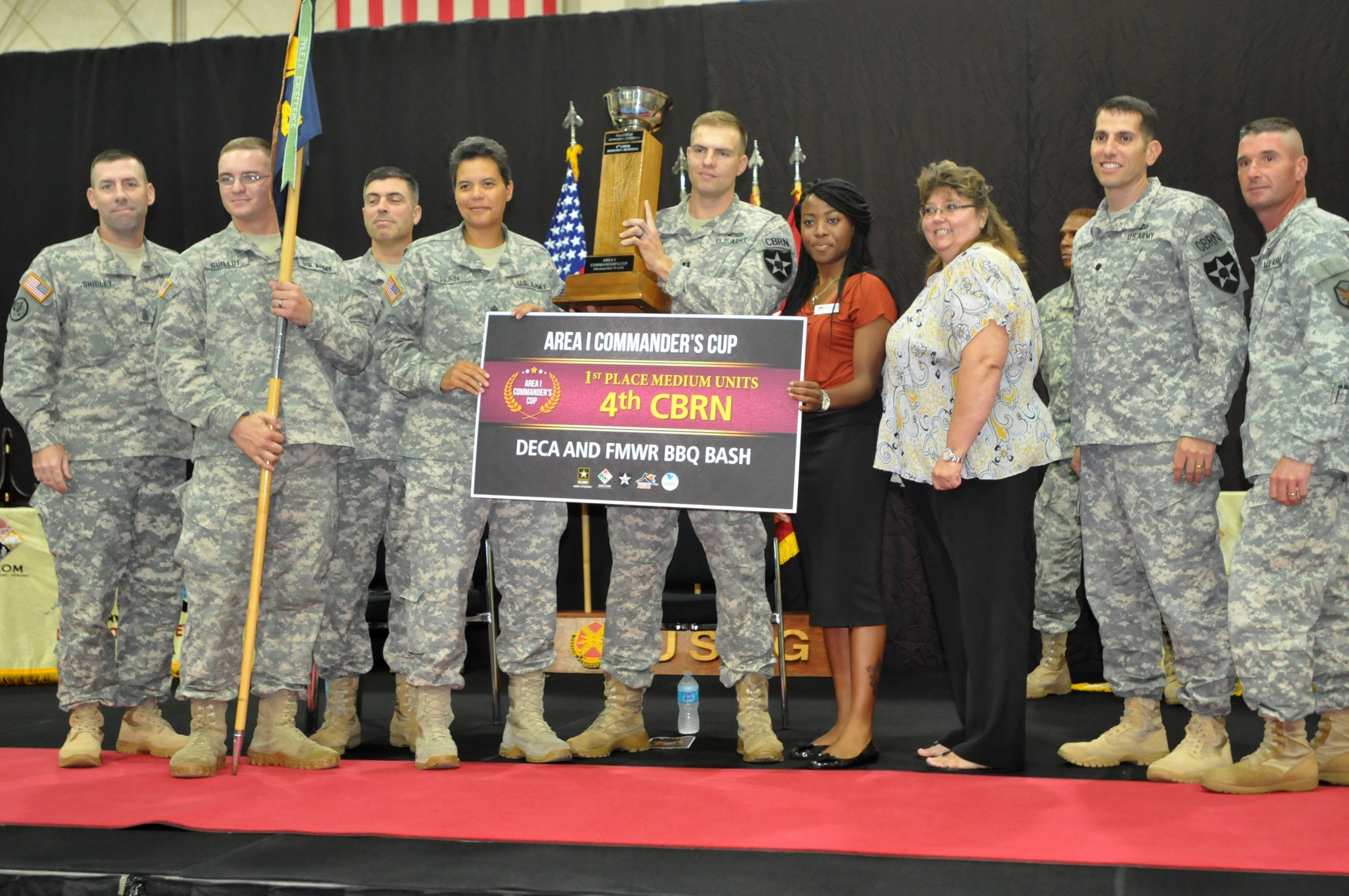
4th CBRN Company pose with a trophy 2014

The 23d CBRN Battalion is currently composed of:

- Headquarters and Headquarters Company, 23rd CBRN Battalion, Camp Humphreys
- 4th CBRN Company, Camp Humphreys
- 61st CBRN Company, Camp Humphreys
- 62nd CBRN Company, Camp Humphreys
- 501st CBRN Company (Technical Escort), Camp Humphreys
- 718th Ordnance Company (EOD), Camp Humphreys

As of 10 June 2013, the following companies were reassigned from the 23rd CBRNE BN.

- 63rd Chemical Company, Fort Campbell – To 2nd CM BN
- 92nd Chemical Company, Fort Stewart -To 83rd CM BN

== Campaign participation credit ==
- World War II
  - Normandy
  - Northern France
  - Rhineland
  - Ardennes-Alsace
  - Central Europe
- Korean War
  - UN Defensive
  - UN Offensive
  - CCF Intervention
  - First UN Counteroffensive
  - CCF Spring Offensive
  - UN Summer-Fall Offensive
  - Second Korean Winter
  - Korea, Summer-Fall 1952
  - Third Korean Winter
  - Korea, Summer 1953
- War on terrorism
  - Afghanistan: Consolidation II

== Decorations ==
- Meritorious Unit Commendation (Army), Streamer embroidered KOREA 1952
- Meritorious Unit Commendation (Army), Streamer embroidered KOREA 1952–1953
- Meritorious Unit Commendation (Army), Streamer embroidered AFGHANISTAN 2007–2008
- Army Superior Unit Award, Streamer embroidered 2013–2014
- Republic of Korea Presidential Unit Citation, Streamer embroidered KOREA 1950–1952
- Republic of Korea Presidential Unit Citation, Streamer embroidered KOREA 1952–1953
