= 37th Field Artillery Regiment =

US military unit

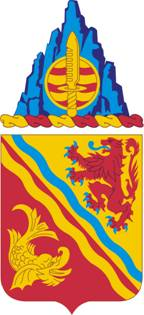
- Coat of arms
- Active: 1918
- Country: United States
- Branch: Army
- Type: Field artillery
- Motto: On the Minute
- Equipment: M777A2 M270A2

Commanders
- LTC Brian H Reynolds: LTC Gregory B Baker

Insignia
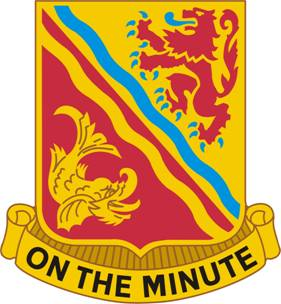
- Distinctive unit insignia

The 37th Field Artillery Regiment is a field artillery regiment of the United States Army, and parent regiment under the U.S. Army Regimental System. The regiment was first constituted 5 July 1918 in the National Army. The regiment served with the 10th Division during World War I, and the 2nd Infantry Division during World War II. Elements of the regiment have served with the 2nd Infantry Division, 6th Infantry Division, 79th Infantry Division, and 172nd Infantry Brigade, among other units. Two battalions of the regiment are currently active, the 1st Battalion, 37th Field Artillery is the 155mm towed cannon battalion assigned to the 1st Stryker Brigade Combat Team, 2nd Infantry Division and the 6th Battalion, 37th Field Artillery is a Multiple Launch Rocket System battalion in the 210th Field Artillery Brigade.

== Current configuration ==
- 1st Battalion 37th Field Artillery Regiment: Active, Regular Army, assigned to 1-2 Stryker Brigade Combat Team, 7th Infantry Division, Joint Base Lewis-McChord, WA
- 2nd Battalion 37th Field Artillery Regiment: Inactive, Regular Army, Inactivated 16 July 1988 at Fort Sill, OK
- 3rd Battalion 37th Field Artillery Regiment: Inactive, Regular Army, Inactivated 16 July 1988 in Germany
- 4th Battalion 37th Field Artillery Regiment: Inactive, Army Reserve, Inactivated 31 January 1968 at Clarksburg, WV
- 5th Battalion 37th Field Artillery Regiment: Inactive, Army Reserve, Inactivated 28 February 1963 at Philadelphia, PA
- 6th Battalion 37th Field Artillery Regiment: Active, Regular Army, assigned to 210th Field Artillery Brigade

== Lineage ==
- Constituted 5 July 1918 in the National Army (USA) as the 37th Field Artillery and assigned to the 13th Division.
- Organized 17 August 1918 at Camp Lewis, Washington.
- Demobilized 11 February 1919 at Camp Lewis, Washington.
- Reconstituted 1 October 1933 in the Regular Army as the 37th Field Artillery.
- Redesignated 1 October 1940 as the 37th Field Artillery Battalion, assigned to the 2d Division (later redesignated as the 2d Infantry Division), and activated at Fort Sam Houston, Texas.
- Reorganized and redesignated 20 February 1956 as the 37th Armored Field Artillery Battalion.
- Relieved 20 June 1957 from assignment to the 2d Infantry Division; concurrently reorganized and redesignated as the 37th Artillery, a parent regiment under the Combat Arms Regimental System.
- Redesignated 1 September 1971 as the 37th Field Artillery.
- Withdrawn 16 February 1987 from the Combat Arms Regimental System and reorganized under the United States Army Regimental System.

== Distinctive unit insignia ==
- Description

On a Gold color metal and enamel device 1 1/8 inches (2.9 cm) in height overall consisting of a shield blazoned: Per bend Or and Gules two bendlets wavy Azure (Celestial) and of the first between a lion rampant of the second and a dolphin counter-embowed of the first. Attached below the shield a Gold scroll inscribed "ON THE MINUTE" in Black letters.

- Symbolism

Scarlet is used for Artillery. The lion, taken from the arms of Belgium, refers to the unit's actions in the Ardennes campaign and at Elsenborn for which it was cited by the Belgian Army. The two wavy bands, representing the Rhine and Naktong rivers, stand for the unit's combat service in the Rhineland and in Korea. The five waves of the blue band refer to its participation in five World War II campaigns. The dolphin stands for Korea, which is bounded on three sides by the sea. It refers particularly to the unit's participation in breaking through the Pusan perimeter after retreating nearly to the sea.

- Background

The first design of the distinctive unit insignia was originally approved for the 37th Field Artillery Battalion on 14 October 1942 and was redesignated for the 37th Artillery Regiment on 10 February 1958. This design was rescinded and the current design approved for the 37th Artillery Regiment on 17 November 1964. The insignia was redesignated effective 1 September 1971, for the 37th Field Artillery Regiment.

== Coat of arms ==
- Blazon
- Shield

Per bend Or and Gules two bendlets wavy Azure (Celestial) and of the first between a lion rampant of the second and a dolphin counter-embowed of the first.

- Crest

On a wreath Or and Gules a mountain with five peaks Azure (Celestial) bearing a bezant charged with a roundel barry wavy of six of the first and second surmounted by a sword-breaker palewise of the first. Motto ON THE MINUTE.

- Symbolism
- Shield

Scarlet is used for Artillery. The lion, taken from the arms of Belgium, refers to the unit's actions in the Ardennes campaign and at Elsenborn for which it was cited by the Belgian Army. The two wavy bands, representing the Rhine and Naktong rivers, stand for the unit's combat service in the Rhineland and in Korea. The five waves of the blue band refer to its participation in five World War II campaigns. The dolphin stands for Korea, which is bounded on three sides by the sea. It refers particularly to the unit's participation in breaking through the Pusan perimeter after retreating nearly to the sea.

- Crest

The crest commemorates the action of the unit at the Battle of Inchon for which it was cited for extraordinary heroism in defeating the short attack of approximately 120,000 Chinese troops. The roundel with yellow and red wavy bands represents the "human sea" of those enemy troops. The sword-breaker, a medieval weapon, refers to the breaking of military power at Hongchon. The mountain represents Korea's mountainous terrain. The five peaks allude to the five unit decorations awarded the organization for service in the Korean War.

- Background

The first design of the coat of arms was originally approved for the 37th Field Artillery Battalion on 1 October 1942 and was redesignated for the 37th Artillery Regiment on 10 February 1958. This design was rescinded and the current design approved for the 37th Artillery Regiment on 17 November 1964. The insignia was redesignated effective 1 September 1971, for the 37th Field Artillery Regiment

== Campaign participation credit ==
- World War II: Normandy, Northern France, Rhineland, Ardennes-Alsace, Central Europe.
- Korean War: UN Defensive, UN Offensive, CCF Intervention, First UN Counteroffensive, CCF Spring Offensive, UN Summer-Fall Offensive, Second Korean Winter, Korea Summer-Fall 1952, Third Korean Winter, Korea Summer 1953.

== Decorations ==
- Presidential Unit Citation (Army) for: TAEGU.
- Presidential Unit Citation (Army) for: CHIPYONG-NI.
- Presidential Unit Citation (Army) for: HONGCHON.
- Belgian Fourragere: 1940.
- Cited in the "Order of the Day" of the Belgian Army for action in the Ardennes.
- Cited in the "Order of the Day" of the Belgian Army for action on Elsenborn Crest.
- Republic of Korea Presidential Unit Citation for: NAKTONG RIVER LINE.
- Republic of Korea Presidential Unit Citation for: KOREA 1950–1953.

== See also ==
- Field Artillery Branch (United States)
