= 38th Field Artillery Regiment =

US military unit

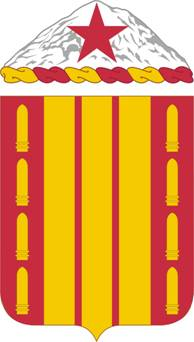
- Coat of arms
- Active: 1918
- Country: United States
- Branch: Army
- Type: Field artillery
- Motto(s): Steel Behind The Rock
- Equipment: M270A1 MLRS

Insignia
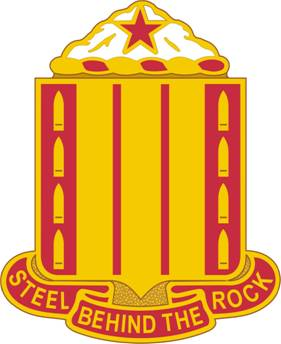
- Distinctive unit insignia

The 38th Field Artillery Regiment is a field artillery regiment of the United States Army.

== History ==
On 17 August 1918, the 38th Field Artillery was organized as a regiment at Camp Lewis, Washington. It trained at that station until 10 February 1919, when the regiment was demobilized. Subsequently, on 1 October 1933, the 38th Field Artillery Regiment was reconstituted as an inactive unit of the regular Army.

The 38th Field Artillery next appears as a part of the Second Infantry Division. On 10 October 1939, the Fifteenth Field Artillery Regiment at Fort Sam Houston, Texas, was re-organized and given a 3rd battalion. Now, however, began the Army's program of modernization, which involved triangularization of the infantry division. in accordance with this program, the Fifteenth's 3rd Battalion was reconstituted as the Thirty-eighth Field Artillery Battalion on 1 October 1940.

== Distinctive unit insignia ==
- Description

A gold color metal and enamel device 1 3/16 inches (3.0 cm) in height overall consisting of the shield, crest and motto of the coat of arms.

- Symbolism

The shield is red for Artillery. The three pallets and eight shells indicate the numerical designation and character of the organization, while the peak of Mt. Rainier and the lone star appearing on the crest refer respectively to the locations where the organization was organized and reactivated.

- Background

The distinctive unit insignia was originally approved for the 38th Field Artillery Battalion on 8 July 1941. It was redesignated for the 38th Artillery Regiment on 24 October 1958. The insignia was redesignated for the 38th Field Artillery Regiment effective 1 September 1971.

== Coat of arms ==
- Blazon
- Shield

Gules (red), three pallets accosted by eight artillery shells Or (gold).

- Crest

On a wreath of the colors Or and Gules the peak of Mt. Rainier Proper charged with a mullet Gules.

- Motto - STEEL BEHIND THE ROCK.
- Symbolism
- Shield

The shield is red for Artillery. The three pallets and eight shells indicate the numerical designation and character of the organization.

- Crest

The peak of Mt. Rainier and the lone star appearing on the crest refer respectively to the locations where the organization was organized and reactivated.

- Background

The coat of arms was originally approved for the 38th Field Artillery Battalion on 8 July 1941. It was redesignated for the 38th Artillery Regiment on 24 October 1958. The insignia was redesignated for the 38th Field Artillery Regiment effective 1 September 1971

== Current configuration ==
- 1st Battalion 38th Field Artillery Regiment (United States)
- 2nd Battalion 38th Field Artillery Regiment (United States)
- 3rd Battalion 38th Field Artillery Regiment (United States)
- 4th Battalion 38th Field Artillery Regiment (United States)
- 5th Battalion 38th Field Artillery Regiment (United States)
- 6th Battalion 38th Field Artillery Regiment (United States)

== See also ==
- Field Artillery Branch (United States)
