= 19th Expeditionary Sustainment Command =

19th Expeditionary Sustainment Command (19th General Support Command)
- Active: July 15, 1964 – present
- Country: United States
- Branch: United States Army
- Type: Command
- Part of: United States Forces Korea
- Garrison/HQ: United States Army Garrison Daegu, South Korea
- Motto: Mission Flexibility
- Website: https://www.army.mil/19thESC#org-about

Commanders
- Current commander: Brig. Gen. Jin H. Pak
- Command Sergeant Major: CSM Jason Towns

Insignia
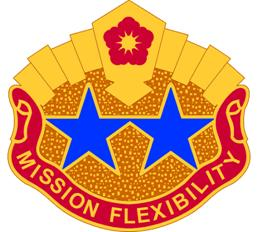
- Distinctive Unit Insignia

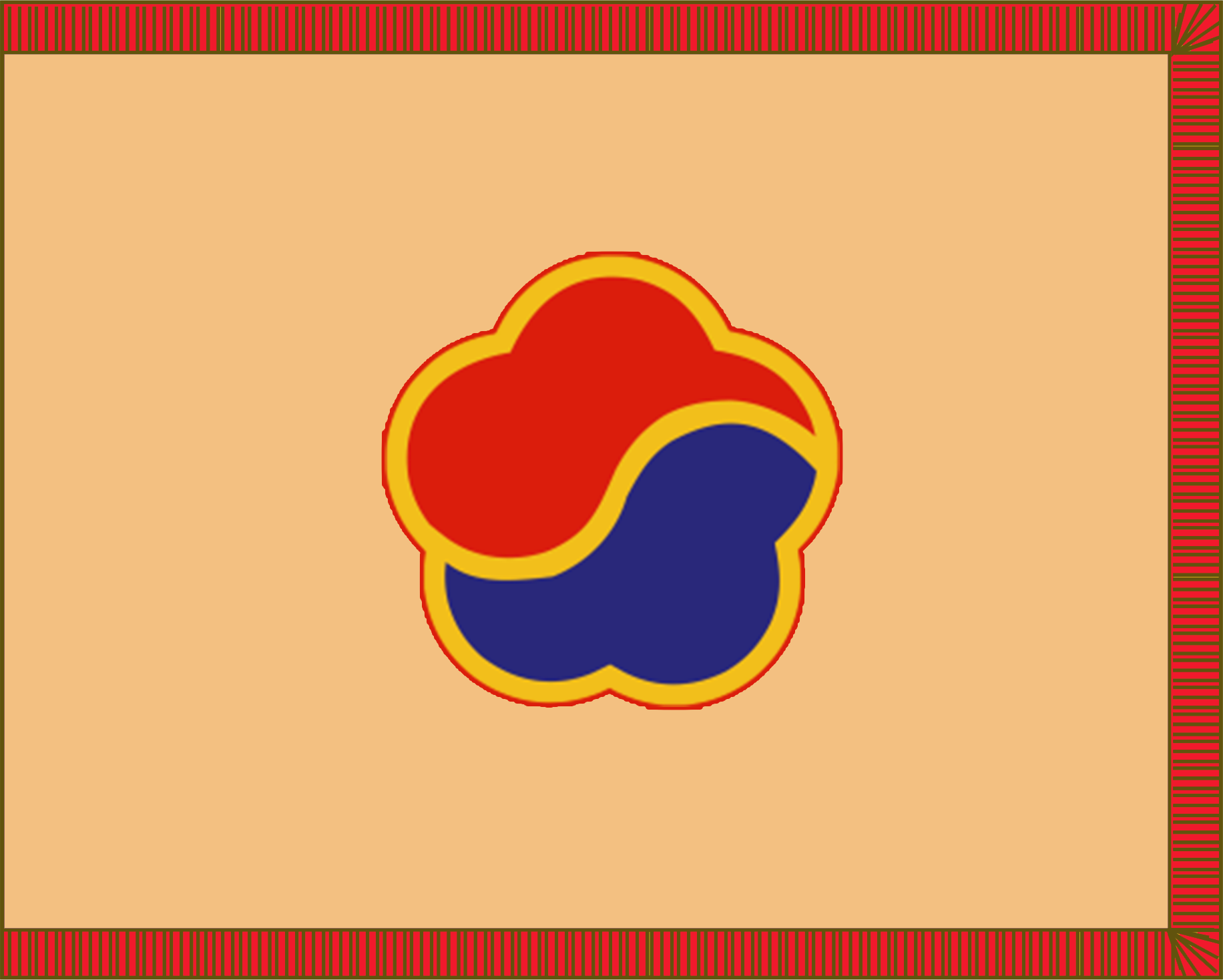
- 19th Sustainment Command Flag

19th Expeditionary Sustainment Command (19 ESC) is a Sustainment Command of the United States Army based within United States Army Garrison Daegu, South Korea. The command was activated on July 15, 1964 in Seoul, South Korea and was redesignated the 19th Support Command in March 1977.

== Organization ==
- 19th Expeditionary Sustainment Command, at Camp Henry
  - Headquarters and Headquarters Company, at Camp Henry
  - 94th Military Police Battalion, at Camp Humphreys
    - 55th Military Police Company, at Camp Casey
    - 142nd Military Police Company, at Yongsan Garrison
    - 188th Military Police Company, at Camp Carroll
    - 557th Military Police Company, at Camp Humphreys
    - 903rd Military Working Dog Detachment, at Camp Carroll
    - U.S. Army Correctional Activity Korea, at Camp Humphreys
  - Materiel Support Command Korea, at Camp Carroll
    - 6th Ordnance Battalion, at Camp Carroll
      - Headquarters and Headquarters Company, at Camp Carroll
      - 17th Ordnance Company, at Camp Casey
      - 52nd Ordnance Company, at Camp Humphreys
      - 84th Ordnance Company, at Camp Carroll
    - 25th Transportation Battalion (Movement Control), at Camp Carroll
      - Headquarters and Headquarters Company, 25th Transportation Battalion (Movement Control), at Camp Carroll
      - 138th Transportation Detachment (Movement Control Team), at Osan Air Base
      - 517th Transportation Detachment (Movement Control Team), at Camp Carroll
      - 662nd Transportation Detachment (Movement Control Team), at Camp Casey
      - 665th Transportation Detachment (Movement Control Team), at Camp Carroll
    - 498th Combat Sustainment Support Battalion, at Camp Carroll
      - Headquarters and Headquarters Company, 498th Combat Sustainment Support Battalion, at Camp Carroll
      - 95th Transportation Medium Truck Company (POL, 5K GAL), at Camp Carroll
      - 176th Financial Management Support Unit, at Camp Casey
      - 246th Quartermaster Detachment (Petroleum Liaison Team), at Camp Henry
      - 339th Quartermaster Company (Petroleum Support), at Camp Humphreys
      - 541st Quartermaster Company (Field Feeding), at Camp Carroll
      - 551st Transportation Company (Inland Cargo Transfer Company), at Camp Carroll
      - Korean Service Corps, at Camp Kim

== Partner Units ==
- US Army Garrison Daegu
- 403rd Army Field Support Brigade
- 2502 Digital Liaison Detachment
- 837th Transportation Battalion
- 411th Contracting Support Brigade
- 168th Multifunctional Medical Battalion
- 658th Regional Support Group
- AFN Daegu
- US Army Medical Materiel Command - Korea

== Insignia ==
The Shoulder Sleeve Insignia is a red and blue Rose of Sharon flower, the national flower of Korea divided in a yin-yang shape. It was originally approved for the 19th Support Brigade on 21 August 1975.

The Distinctive Unit Insignia is a gold metal device with two blue stars under a gold arch containing a red Rose of Sharon flower. Underneath is s red scroll with the words "Mission Flexibility."
