= Impact of the COVID-19 pandemic on the military =

Armed forces play a crucial role when responding to crises and emergencies. In response to the COVID-19 pandemic, militaries were readily deployed in many countries to assist the civilian medical personnel and overwhelmed hospitals by creating additional hospitals and providing other additional resources. Apart from the management of the health crises, the pandemic has had a significant impact on the military operations. The security and defence related aspects including the missions, operations and training were adversely affected with the Covid-19. The broad spread of Covid can limit the defence forces' ability to carry out a mission. Many military training and exercises have been postponed or cancelled.

== Impact of COVID-19 ==
=== Impact on recruit training ===
Recruit training that involves several hundred recruits increased the safety risk during the Covid pandemic. Limiting the spread of Covid was a top priority to ensure that the training can be conducted without interruption. The immediate measure to limit the spread of the pandemic was to limit the movement of trainees and trainers through lockdown, quarantine and so on.

The lockdowns and restrictions as a result of Covid-19 prevented the entry of trainers into institutes, reduced the number of new trainees and the final phase of induction training was left incomplete. The defences forces recruitment process including collective training activities and induction processing came to a halt as a result of Covid -19. The low recruitment rates and increased turnover rates in the military have led to the military strength falling below the minimum. The strength of the defence forces depends on competent staff. Military authorities have warned about the need for urgent measures to boost retention and increase recruitment to address the current shortage of defence force personnel as a result of Covid.

=== Physical and Mental Health ===
The Covid-19 pandemic adversely affected the physical and mental health of military veterans. Studies indicate that some military veterans without insomnia symptoms before the pandemic developed either subthreshold or clinical insomnia symptoms during the pandemic period.

== Responses ==
Military forces all over the world are adopting several measures to minimise the threats of the Covid pandemic on the military readiness to fulfil missions. The nature of responses of the defence forces during the Covid pandemic has significant impact on international safety missions.

=== Asia ===
On 27 February, South Korea and the United States (US) cancelled joint military exercises scheduled for March 2020. The Israeli defence force implemented social distancing through measures such as splitting personnel's into separate shifts, reducing the number of personnel in a single room and minimising exposure between military personnel and civilians. Putting units into quarantine, using masks and other personal protective equipment and use of disinfectants were other methods adopted to contain the Covid pandemic in the Israeli defence force.

=== Europe ===
On 11 March, the Norwegian Armed Forces cancelled the Cold Response 20 exercise planned to involve NATO and allied personnel.

During the first wave of the pandemic in Italy, the Italian armed forces worked with the national government to provide civilian healthcare and logistical support throughout the country, in addition to serve as lockdown enforcement alongside the police.

On 25 March, president of France Emmanuel Macron launched "Operation Resilience" to enable the French armed forces to provide civilian support during the pandemic in France and overseas French territories.

European forces have mainly been deployed to support health capacities, provide logistical support and carry out security tasks.

=== North America ===
==== United States ====
The military exercises scheduled in the first half of 2020 were cancelled. The cancelled exercises include a joint fire exercise on the dynamic front, saber strike, joint warfighting assessment and swift response. On 16 March, the National Defense Industrial Association in the United States cancelled the 2020 Special Operations Forces Industry Conference scheduled for May 2020. On 25 March, the Department of Defense prohibited the deployment of servicemembers for 60 days to mitigate spread of the virus. On 27 March, the United States cancelled large-scale exercises involving thousands of troops in the Philippines that had been scheduled for May 2020. In addition, the movement of personnel and equipment from the US to Europe also ceased due to concerns over Covid-19. All the cancelled exercises were crucial to enhance NATO's military capabilities and improve their ability to defend against Russian aggression. On 6 April, the United States Forces Japan declared a Public Health Emergency on the Kanto Plain installations. In May 2020, the Department of Defense issued a memo banning survivors of COVID-19 from joining the military. In June 2020, the United States Navy came up with guidance to combat COVID-19 and deploy safely using the smallest effort possible.

===== Withdrawal of U.S. troops from Iraq =====
On 20 March 2020, CJTF-OIR confirmed that certain troops would be withdrawing from Iraq due to the pandemic.

== Infection ==
=== Military bases ===
==== India ====
INS Angre

On 2020.04.18, it was announced that 21 sailors staying at INS Angre, a naval base in Mumbai, had tested positive. Most of the cases were asymptomatic, and all of the cases had been traced to a sailor who tested positive on 2020.04.07. The Navy emphasized that no sailors serving on a ship or submarine had been infected.

==== United Kingdom ====
Akrotiri and Dhekelia

On 15 March, the first two cases in Akrotiri and Dhekelia were confirmed.

==== United States ====
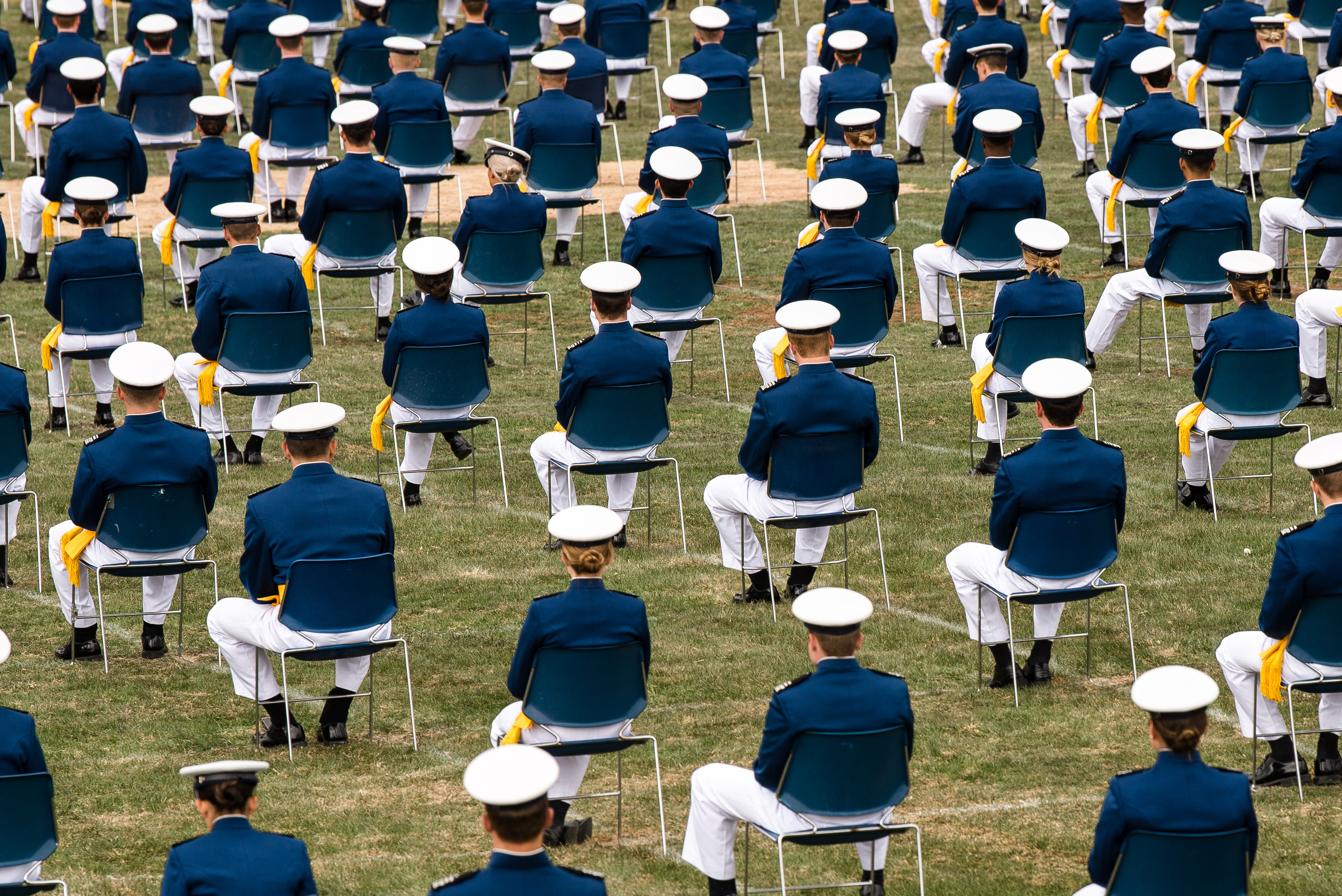
United States Air Force Academy cadets partake in social distancing during their graduation ceremony, April 18, 2020

Guantanamo Bay Naval Base

On 24 March, the first case in Guantanamo Bay Naval Base was confirmed.

United States Forces Korea

On 26 February, the first case was confirmed to have spread to the Camp Humphreys.

As of 22 April, a total of 22 SARS-CoV-2 cases were laboratory confirmed at United States Forces Korea bases: 10 at Camp Humpreys, 8 at Daegu and Gyeongsangbuk Province bases (Camp Carroll, Camp Henry and Camp Walker), 3 at the Osan Air Base, and 1 at the Camp Casey.

=== Naval ships ===
The COVID-19 pandemic spread to a number of naval ships, with the nature of such ships, including working with others in small enclosed areas and the lack of private quarters for the vast majority of crew, contributing to the rapid spread of the disease, even more so than on cruise ships. The important nature of naval personnel compared to cruise ship personnel and passengers make such COVID-19 outbreaks on naval ships more concerning.
