= United States Army Garrison Daegu =

Coordinates: 35°51′N 128°36′E

- USAG Daegu crest
- Active: 1950–present
- Country: United States of America
- Branch: United States Army
- Type: Army Garrison
- Part of: Department of Defense: Department of the Army; Installation Management Command
- Nickname: USAG Daegu
- Mottos: Sustain, Support, Defend
- Colors: Red, green, black & gold
- Website: www.home.army.mil/daegu/

Commanders
- Garrison Commander: Col. Jeffrey D. Noll
- Command Sergeant Major: Command Sgt. Maj. Daniel C. Hopkins

United States Army Garrison Daegu, also known as USAG Daegu, is a medium-sized United States Army Garrison headquartered in Nam Gu, Daegu, in South Korea. USAG Daegu provides base operations and support for Camps Henry, Walker and George in Daegu, Camp Carroll in Waegwan, Chilgok County, the Busan Storage facility and Pier 8 in Busan Metropolitan City, the DLA Disposition Services in Apo-eup Gimcheon and almost a dozen other remote mountaintop sites. USAG Daegu also provides support to the United States Navy at Commander Fleet Activities Chinhae in Jinhae-gu, to the United States Marine Corps at Camp Mujuk in Pohang, and to the United States Air Force at K-2 Airfield located at the Daegu International Airport. Nearly 10,000 Soldiers, Family members, Civilian employees, KATUSA Soldiers and Korean employees live and work at USAG Daegu installations.

USAG Daegu is a subordinate unit to the United States Army Installation Management Command, Pacific Region (IMCOM Pacific) in Hawaii. IMCOM Pacific reports directly to Installation Management Command, a single organization with five regional offices worldwide, which was activated on October 24, 2006. IMCOM is a major subordinate of the U.S. Army Materiel Command. USAG Daegu is responsible for safety and security, construction, family care, food management, environmental programs, well-being, logistics, public works and all facets of installation management on the installations. USAG Daegu supports 42 separate units and agencies within it camps.

== History ==
The U.S. Army Garrison Daegu was originally constituted on October 16, 2003, in the regular Army as the Area IV Support Activity. The Area IV Support Activity was re-designated as U.S. Army Garrison Daegu on March 28, 2007. The former Area IV Support Activity assumed the base operations mission from the 20th Area Support Group (subsequently relocated to Camp Carroll, South Korea in April 2005 and deactivated in June 2006), which held the mission since August 16, 1985. Activation of the Area IV Support Activity signaled the separation of the base operations mission from the 20th ASG, which had two missions including combat service support in the lower third of the Republic of Korea. USAG Daegu has earned numerous awards for excellence in installation support, underlined by recognition as a multiple winner of the Army Community of Excellence Awards.

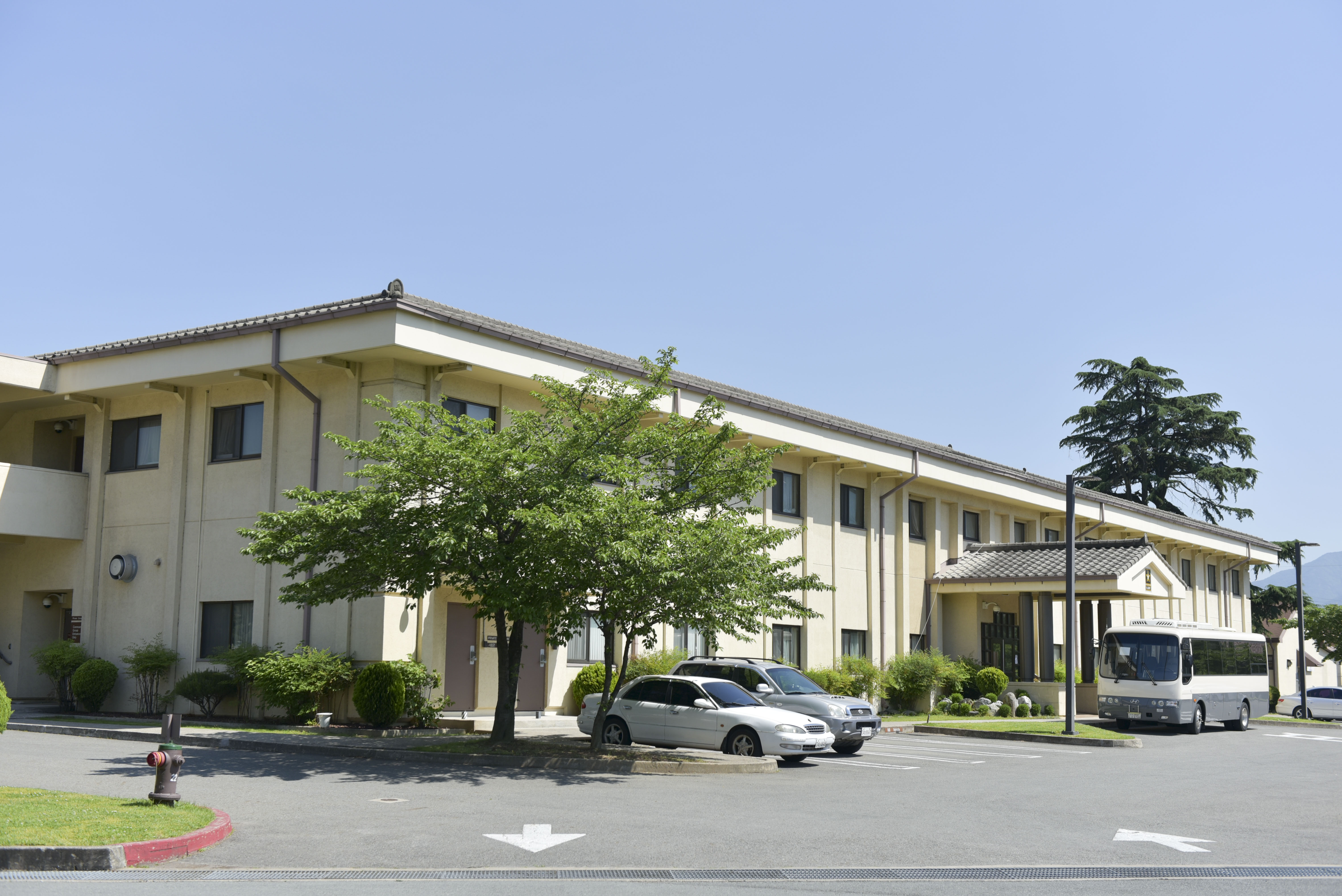
Headquarters of USAG Daegu, Camp Henry.

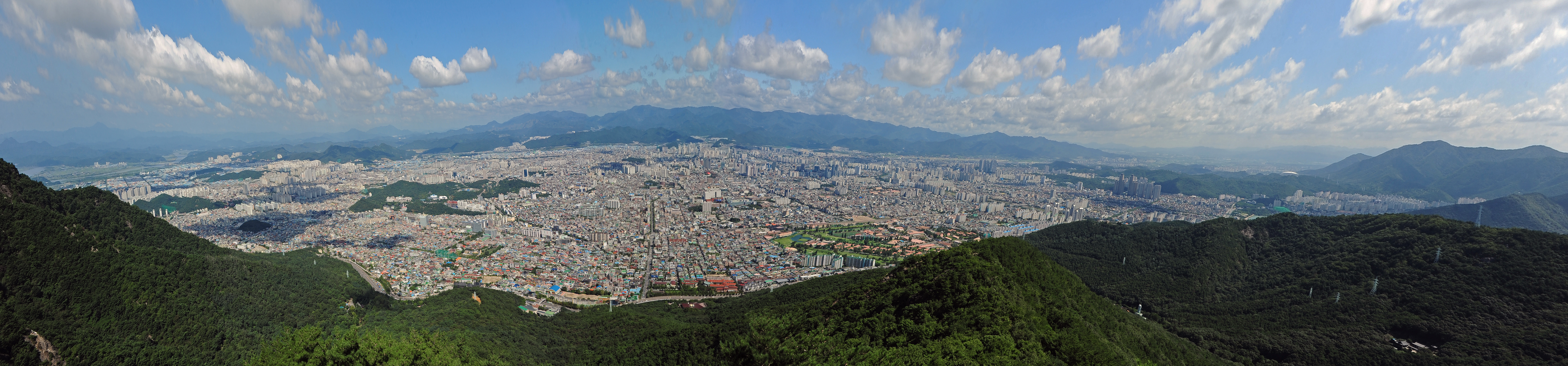
Landscape of Daegu Metropolitan City from Apsan Mountain.

== Geography ==
USAG Daegu is home to Camps Henry, Walker, George and Carroll (Waegwan). The city of Daegu, which is located in the Gyeongbuk Province, is the fourth largest city in South Korea with a population of about 2.5 million. It is located approximately 200 miles south of Seoul. Camp Carroll is located in the city of Waegwan which has a population of about 30,000

== Population ==
USAG Daegu supports 42 tenant units and agencies with about 10,000 U.S. military, KATUSA Soldiers, American and Korean civilian employees, contractors, and family members who work and or live on Area IV installations.

The Daegu enclave (Camps Henry, Walker and George) has a population of about 5,000. There are about 1,100 U.S. Army Soldiers, which compose the largest single segment of the population. Other members of the community include Department of the Army civilian employees, contractors, Korean national employees, Korean Augmentation to the U.S. Army, or KATUSA Soldiers, and family members. The total population of Camp Carroll is about 4,200.

== Occupants ==
The following units are stationed at USAG Daegu:

- 19th Expeditionary Sustainment Command
- 403rd Army Field Support Brigade
- 36th Signal Battalion
- 25th Transportation Battalion
- 6th Ordnance Battalion
- 2nd Battalion, 1st Air Defense Artillery Regiment
- 168th Multifunctional Medical Battalion
- 524th Military Intelligence Battalion
- 498th Combat Sustainment Support Battalion
- 188th Military Police Company “Original Warfighters”
- 629th Medical Company (Area Support)
- U.S. Army Cadet Command (ROTC)
- Daegu Middle High School
- AFN Daegu

They include Army, Navy, Marines (III Marine Expeditionary Force (III MEF), G4, Logistics Det), Air Force (607 SS, K2 AB), Family members, Retirees, invited U.S. Contractors and Department of Defense civilian employees.

== Installation ==
Camp Henry, the headquarters of US Army Garrison Daegu, consists primarily of administrative buildings and community support activities. Camp Walker contains the major life support activities for the U.S. Army enclave in Daegu. Camp George is home to Daegu Elementary School, Mountain View Village apartments, and the Cross-Cultural Training and Counseling Center, but is home to no military units. Camp Carroll is located in the city of Waegwan. The surrounding area is occupied mainly by service businesses (e.g. dry cleaners, restaurants), and caters to American Soldiers.

=== Camp Henry ===
Camp Henry (Korean: 캠프 헨리)

=== Camp Walker ===
Camp Walker (Korean: 캠프 워커)

=== Camp Carroll ===
Camp Carroll, South Korea (Korean: 캠프 캐롤)

=== Camp George ===
Camp George (Korean: 캠프 조지)

== See also ==
- List of United States Army installations in South Korea
