= List of United States Army installations in South Korea =

This is an incomplete list of current/former U.S. Army posts in South Korea, although a number have been closed or are in caretaker status:

== United States Army installations in South Korea ==
- Camp Ames
- Camp Bonifas - turned over to ROK in 2006
- Camp Carroll
- Camp Casey
- Camp Castle - closed
- Camp Coiner - northern portion turned over to US Embassy in Dec 2017, southern portion remains open
- Camp Colbern - closed
- USAG Daegu
- Camp Eagle - closed
- Camp Edwards - closed
- Camp Eiler - closed
- Camp Essayons - closed
- Camp Falling Water - closed
- Camp Garry Owen - closed
- Camp George
- Camp Giant - closed
- Camp Greaves - closed
- Hannam Village - closed
- Camp Henry
- Camp Hialeah - closed
- Camp Holiday - closed
- Camp Hovey
- Camp Howze - closed
- USAG Humphreys
- Camp Indian - closed
- Camp Jackson - closed
- Camp Kim - closed
- Camp Kyle - closed
- Camp Liberty Bell
- Camp LaGuardia (US Army Airfield) - closed
- Camp Long - closed
- Camp Long Jon
- Camp Market - closed
- Camp McNabb (Jeju Island) – closed
- Camp Mercer, Seoul - 44th Engineering Battalion
- Camp Mobile
- Camp Mosier (U.S. 43rd Mash Unit and 377th Air Ambulance) - closed
- Camp Nimble - closed
- Camp Page - closed
- Camp Red Cloud - turned over to ROK in 2018
- Camp Sarafi - closed
- Camp Sears - closed
- Camp St Barbara - turned over to ROK in 1971
- Camp Stanley - closed
- Camp Tobongsan - closed
- Camp Walker
- USAG Yongsan
- H220 Heliport - turned over to ROK in May 2022
- K-16 Air Base
- Kunsan Pol Terminal Site
- Madison Site
- Masan Ammunition Depot
- Seobingo Compound
- Pier #8
- Tango (U.S. Army)
- Yong Pyong

=== Installations in the Kaesong-Munsan Corridor ===
"Korea’s mountainous terrain channels traditional invasion routes along narrow north-south axes as well as broader plains in the Western (Kaesong-Munsan) Corridor and the Chorwon-Uijongbu Valley."

- AFKN Rec (Armed Forces Korean Network Recreation facility)
- Cp. Alamo
- Cp. Alex Williams
- Cp. Ames, Taejon
- Cp. Ashworth (Was * Cp. Semper Fidelis)
- Cp. Baker
- Cp. Beard
- Cp. Beaumont
- Cp. Beavers, ~ Fort Beavers, Munsan
- Blue Lancer Valley
- Cp. Bonifas (Was * Cp. Kitty Hawk)
- Cp. Bray
- Cp. Britannia
- Cp. Brown
- Cp. Carroll, Waegwan
- Cp. Casey
- Cp. Castle
- Cp. Clinch
- Cp. Coiner, Seoul
- Cp. Colbern, Seoul
- Cp. Coursen
- Cp. Crawford
- Cp. Custer
- Cp. Daughtry
- DESO Yard (Storage/Equipment yard)
- Cp. Dodge
- Cp. Eagle, Wonju
- Cp. Echo Hill
- Cp. Edwards
- Cp. Eiler
- Cp. El Paso, Chin-chon
- Cp. Essayons
- Cp. Ethan Allen
- Cp. Falling Water
- Cp. Garry Owen (Was * Cp. Rice)
- Cp. George, Taegu
- Cp. Giant
- Cp. Grant
- Cp. Gray
- Cp. Greaves
- Cp. Griffin
- Cp. Hamilton
- Cp. Handrich
- Cp. Hartell
- Cp. Henry, Taegu
- Cp. Hialeah
- Cp. Hill
- Cp. Holiday
- Cp. Houston
- Cp. Hovey
- Cp. Howard, Suhawhnee
- Cp. Howze
- Cp. Humphrey
- Cp. Huston
- Cp. Indian
- Cp. Irwin
- Cp. Jackson
- Cp. Jeb Stuart
- Cp. Jessup
- Cp. Jecelin, Uijongbu
- Cp. Johnson
- Cp. Jonathan Williams
- Cp. Kaiser
- Cp. Kim, Seoul
- Cp. Kitty Hawk (Renamed * Cp. Bonifas)
- Cp. Knox, Pobwoni
- Cp. Kwangsa-ri
- Cp. Kyle
- Cp. Laguardia, Uijongbu
- Cp. Lawton
- Cp. Lee
- Cp. Libby
- Cp. Liberty Bell
- Cp. Long
- Cp. Mackenzie
- Cp. Mcnabb, Cheju-do
- Cp. Market, Bup Yong
- Cp. Matta
- Cp. Matthews
- Mcdonald Barracks
- Cp. Mcgovern
- Cp. Mcintyre
- Lester Mcmahan Barracks
- Cp. Mcnair, Pobwonni
- Cp. Mercer
- Cp. Meyer
- Cp. Mobile
- Cp. Mosier
- Cp. Muchuck, Po'hang
- Cp. Nabors
- Cp. Nimble
- Cp. Paine
- Cp. Page
- Panmunjom (Jsa - Joint Security Area)
- Cp. Parris
- Cp. Pelham
- Cp. Peterson
- Rc #1, Crossroads Service Club
- Rc #2, Camelot Hall Service Club
- Rc #3, Frontline Service Club
- Rc #4, Chogie Inn Service Club
- Cp. Pope
- Cp. Red Cloud
- Cp. Reddick
- Cp. Rice (Renamed * Cp. Garry Owen)
- Cp. Richmond, O Sa Ri
- Cp. Ringgold
- Cp. Roberts, Yongdong Po
- Cp. Rodstrom
- Cp. Rose, Pan Ae
- Cp. Ross, Munsani
- Saa
- Cp. Sabre, Munsan
- Salamanca
- Cp. Sammi
- Cp. Santa Barbara
- Cp. Sarafi
- Cp. Sears
- Cp. Semper Fedelis (Renamed * Cp. Ashworth)
- Cp. Sill
- Cp. Sitman
- Cp. Snow
- Cp. Spade
- Cp. Stanley
- Cp. Stanton
- Cp. Story
- Cp. Summerall
- Suwon
- Cp. Sykes
- Cp. Thompson
- Cp. Woods
- Cp. Wagner
- Cp. Walker, Taegu
- Cp. Walley
- Cp. Warner, Pobwonni
- Warrior Base
- Cp. Wentzel
- Cp. Wilber
- Cp. Wilson
- Cp. Young
- Yongsan Garrison

Circa 1982 the 2nd Infantry Division occupied 17 camps, 27 sites, and 6 combat guard posts.

== See also ==
- List of United States military bases
- Camp Mujuk, Only US Marine Corps Base in South Korea

== Sources ==
- "Maps Locating Army Active, Reserve and National Guard and Marine Field Artillery Units". Field Artillery (PB 6-87-6 (TEST)). US Field Artillery Association: 32–36. December 1987. ISSN 0191-975X.
- "Eighth Army in Korea-Continuing a Tradition". Soldier Support Journal. 9 (3). US Army Soldier Support Center: 12–16. May–June 1982. ISSN 0274-9513. Article contributed by the Public Affairs Office, Headquarters, US Forces, Korea.
