= Eighth Army (United States) =

Only Field Army of the U.S. Army stationed in South Korea

- Eighth Army Shoulder Sleeve Insignia
- Active: 10 June 1944 – present (82 years, 4 months)
- Country: United States
- Branch: United States Army
- Type: Field army
- Role: Headquarters
- Part of: USARPAC
- Garrison/HQ: Camp Humphreys
- Motto: Pacific Victors
- Colors: White and red
- Decorations: Superior Unit Award; Philippine Republic Presidential Unit Citation; Presidential Unit Citation (South Korea) with Two Oak Leaf Clusters
- Campaigns: World War II; New Guinea; Leyte; Korean War; UN Defensive; UN Offensive; CCF Intervention; First UN Counteroffensive; CCF Spring Offensive; UN Summer-Fall Offensive; Second Korean Winter; Korea, Summer-Fall 1952; Third Korean Winter; Korea, Summer 1953
- Website: 8tharmy.korea.army.mil

Commanders
- Commanding General: LTG Joseph Hilbert
- Deputy Commanding General - Operations: BG Robert S. Brown
- Deputy Commanding General - Sustainment: BG William F. Wilkerson
- Deputy Commanding Officer - ROK: COL Sang Hun Lee, Republic of Korea Army
- Command Sergeant Major: CSM Jeffery D. Weaver
- Notable commanders: LTG Robert Eichelberger; LTG Walton H. Walker; LTG Matthew Ridgway; LTG James Van Fleet; LTG Maxwell D. Taylor

Insignia
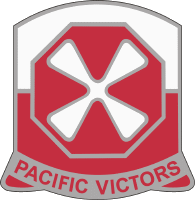
- Distinctive insignia

- Flag

- NATO Map Symbol (1997)

The Eighth Army (EUSA) is a U.S. field army which commands all United States Army forces in South Korea. It is headquartered at the Camp Humphreys in the Anjeong-ri of Pyeongtaek, South Korea. Eighth Army relocated its headquarters from Yongsan to Camp Humphreys in the summer of 2017. It is the only field army in the U.S. Army. It is responsible to United States Forces Korea and United States Army, Pacific.

== History ==
=== World War II ===
The unit first activated on 10 June 1944 in the United States, under the command of Lieutenant General Robert L. Eichelberger. The Eighth Army took part in many of the amphibious landings in the Southwest Pacific Theater of World War II, eventually participating in no less than sixty of them. The first mission of the Eighth Army, in September 1944, was to take over from the U.S. Sixth Army in New Guinea, New Britain, the Admiralty Islands and on Morotai, in order to free up the Sixth Army to engage in the Philippines campaign (1944–45).

The Eighth Army again followed in the wake of the Sixth Army in December 1944, when it took over control of operations on Leyte Island on 26 December. In January, the Eighth Army entered combat on Luzon, landing the XI Corps on 29 January near San Antonio and the 11th Airborne Division on the other side of Manila Bay two days later. Combining with I Corps and XIV Corps of Sixth Army, the forces of Eighth Army next enveloped Manila in a great double-pincer movement. Eighth Army's final operation of the Pacific War was that of clearing out the southern Philippines of the Japanese Army, including on the major island of Mindanao, an effort that occupied the soldiers of the Eighth Army for the rest of the war.

=== Occupation of Japan ===
Eighth Army was to have participated in Operation Downfall, the invasion of Japan. It would have taken part in Operation Coronet, the second phase of the invasion, which would have seen the invasion of the Kantō Plain on eastern Honshū. However, the Japanese surrender cancelled the invasion, and the Eighth Army found itself in charge of a peaceful occupation. Occupation forces landed on 30 August 1945, with its headquarters in Yokohama, then the HQ moved to the Dai-Ichi building in Tokyo.

At the beginning of 1946, Eighth Army assumed responsibility for occupying all of Japan. Between February 1946 and October 1949, the Eighth Army tried 996 suspected Japanese war criminals in the Yokohama War Crimes Trials, convicting 854. These trials constituted the majority of American war crimes trials in the Asia-Pacific region. Four quiet years then followed, during which the Eighth Army gradually transitioned from a combat-ready fighting force into a constabulary. Lieutenant General Walton H. Walker took command in September 1948, and he tried to re-invigorate the Army's training, with mixed success.

=== Korean War ===
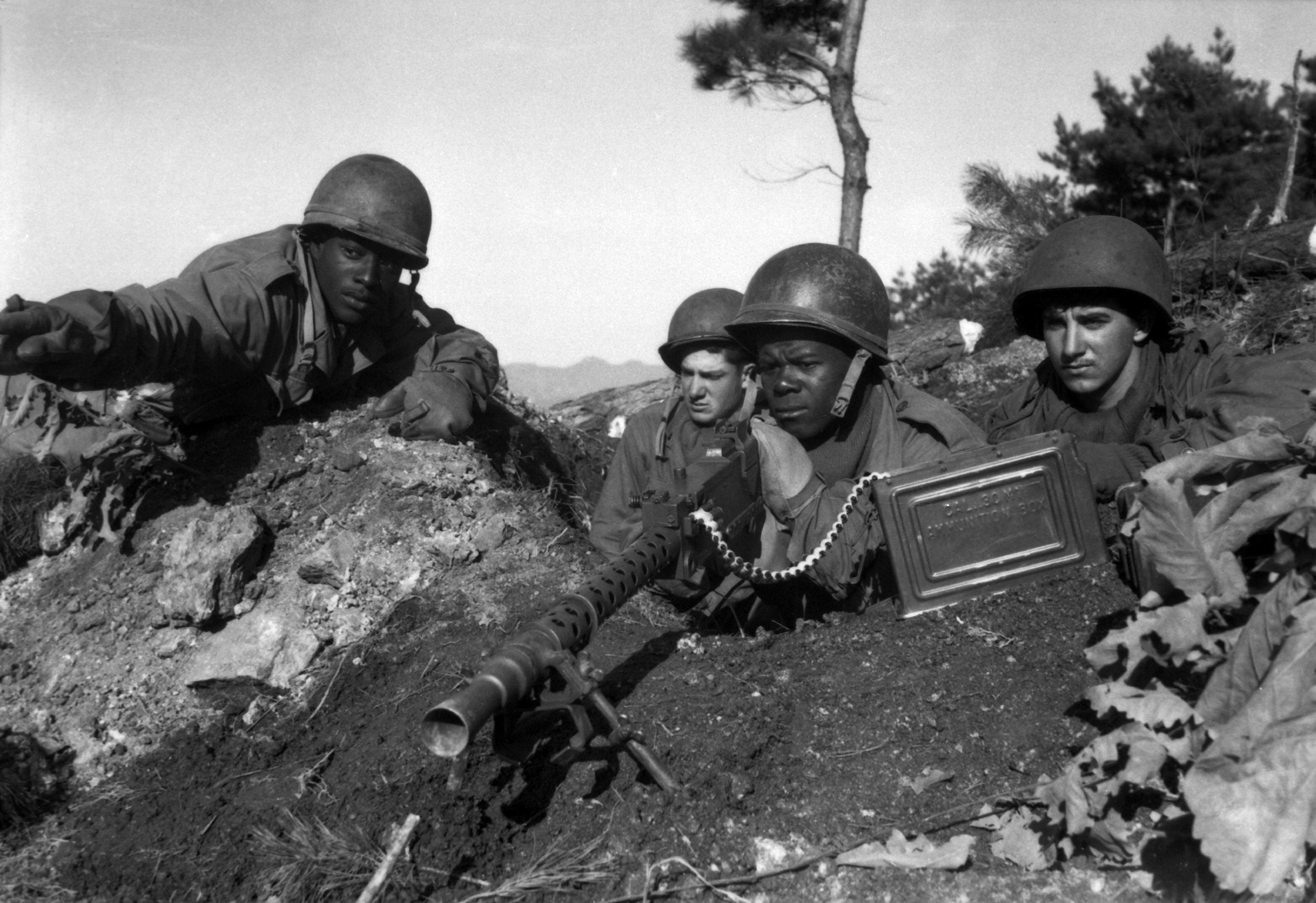
Fighting with the 2nd Inf. Div. north of the Chongchon River, SFC Major Cleveland, weapons squad leader, points out Communist-led North Korean position to his machine gun crew, 20 November 1950, PFC James Cox.

In June 1950 75,000 North Korean Korean People's Army (KPA) troops with Soviet made tanks invaded South Korea, igniting the Korean War. U.S. naval and air forces quickly became involved in combat operations, and it was soon clear that U.S. ground forces would have to be committed. To stem the North Korean advance, the occupation forces in Japan were thus shipped off to South Korea as quickly as possible, but their lack of training and equipment was telling, as some of the initial U.S. units were destroyed by the KPA. However, the stage was eventually reached as enough units of Eighth Army arrived in Korea to make a firm front. The KPA threw themselves against that front, the Pusan Perimeter, and failed to break it.

Eighth Army arrived in July 1950 and never left. —Lt. Gen. Thomas S. Vandal, CG, Eighth Army, 29 August 2017

In the meantime, Eighth Army had reorganized, since it had too many divisions under its command for it to exercise effective control directly. The I Corps and the IX Corps were reactivated in the United States and then shipped to Korea to assume command of Eighth Army's subordinate divisions.

The stalemate was broken by the Inchon landings of the X Corps (consisting of soldiers and Marines). The KPA, confronted with this threat to their rear areas, combined with a breakout operation at Pusan, broke away and hastily retired north.

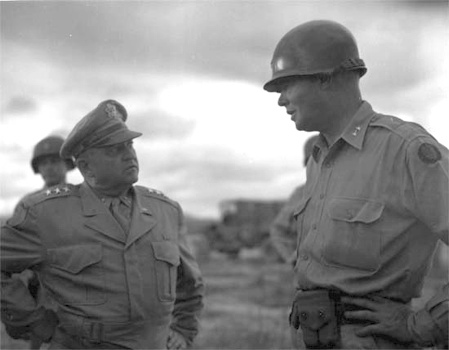
Lt. Gen. Walton Walker, Commander of 8th Army (left) confers with Maj. Gen. William F. Dean, Commander Ground Forces in Korea, on 7 July 1950

Both South and North Korea were almost entirely occupied by United Nations forces. However, once U.S. units neared the Yalu River and the frontier between North Korea and China, the Chinese People's Volunteer Army (PVA) intervened and drastically changed the character of the war. Eighth Army was decisively defeated at the Battle of the Chongchon River and forced to retreat back into South Korea, the longest retreat of any U.S. military unit in history. General Walker was killed in a jeep accident on 23 December 1950, and replaced by Lieutenant general Matthew Ridgway. The overstretched Eighth Army suffered heavily with the Chinese offensive, who were able to benefit from shorter lines of communication and with rather casually deployed enemy forces. The Chinese broke through the U.S. defenses despite U.S. air supremacy and the Eighth Army and U.N. forces retreated hastily to avoid encirclement. The Chinese offensive continued pressing U.S. forces, which lost Seoul, the South Korean capital. Eighth Army's morale and esprit de corps hit rock bottom, to where it was widely regarded as a broken, defeated rabble.

Ridgway forcefully restored Eighth Army to combat effectiveness over several months. Eighth Army slowed and ultimately halted the Chinese advance at the battles of Chipyong-ni and Wonju. It then counter-attacked the Chinese, re-took Seoul, and drove to the 38th parallel, where the front stabilized.

When Ridgway replaced General of the Army Douglas MacArthur as the overall U.N. commander, Lieutenant general James Van Fleet assumed command of Eighth Army. After the war of movement during the first stages, the fighting in Korea settled down to a war of attrition. Ceasefire negotiations were begun at the village of Panmunjom in the summer of 1951, and they dragged on for two years. During the final combat operation of the war, Lieutenant general Maxwell D. Taylor (promoted to general 23 June 1953) commanded the Eighth Army. When the Military Demarcation Line was finally agreed to by the Korean Armistice Agreement, South Korea and North Korea continued on as separate states.

=== Guarding Korea ===
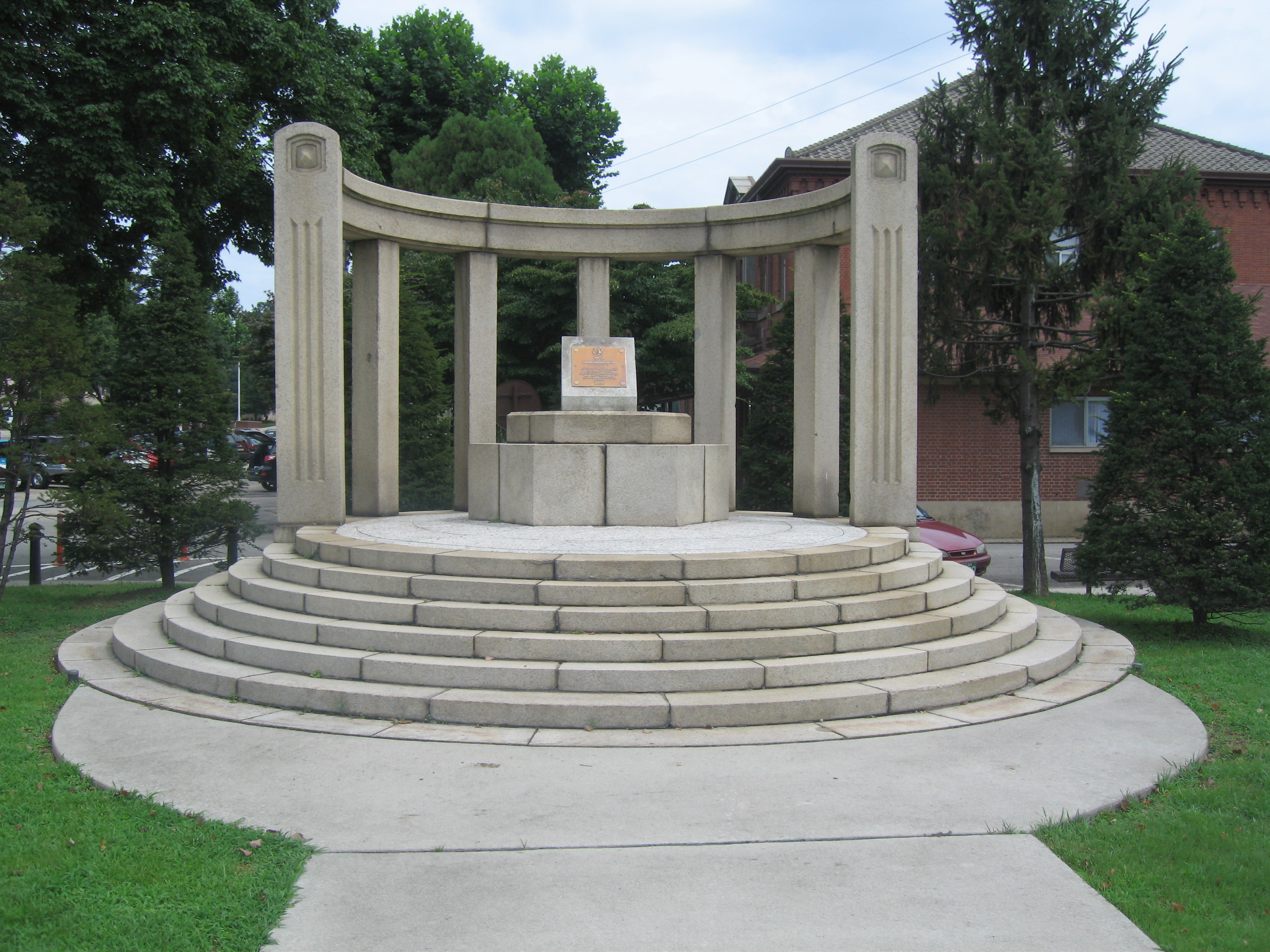
Eighth United States Army memorial at Yongsan

During the aftermath of the Korean War, the Eighth Army remained in South Korea. By the 1960s, I Corps, consisting of the 7th Infantry Division and the 2nd Infantry Division, remained as part of the Eighth Army. Then, in 1971, the 7th Infantry Division was withdrawn, along with the command units of I Corps, which were moved across the Pacific Ocean to Fort Lewis, Washington. Later, in March 1977, a memo from President Jimmy Carter said "...American forces will be withdrawn. Air cover will be continued." Bureaucratic resistance from the Executive Branch, with support in Congress, eventually saw the proposal watered down. Eventually one combat battalion and about 2,600 non-combat troops were withdrawn.

This left the 2nd Infantry Division at the Korean Demilitarized Zone to assist the South Korean Army. Besides forming a trip-wire against another North Korean invasion, the 2nd Infantry Division remained there as the only Army unit in South Korea armed with tactical nuclear weapons. (Otherwise, there is only the U.S. Air Force in South Korea and on Okinawa.) All nuclear weapons were taken from the Army to be under Air Force control. Later, in 1991, all U.S. nuclear weapons were removed from South Korea.

==== Structure 1989 ====
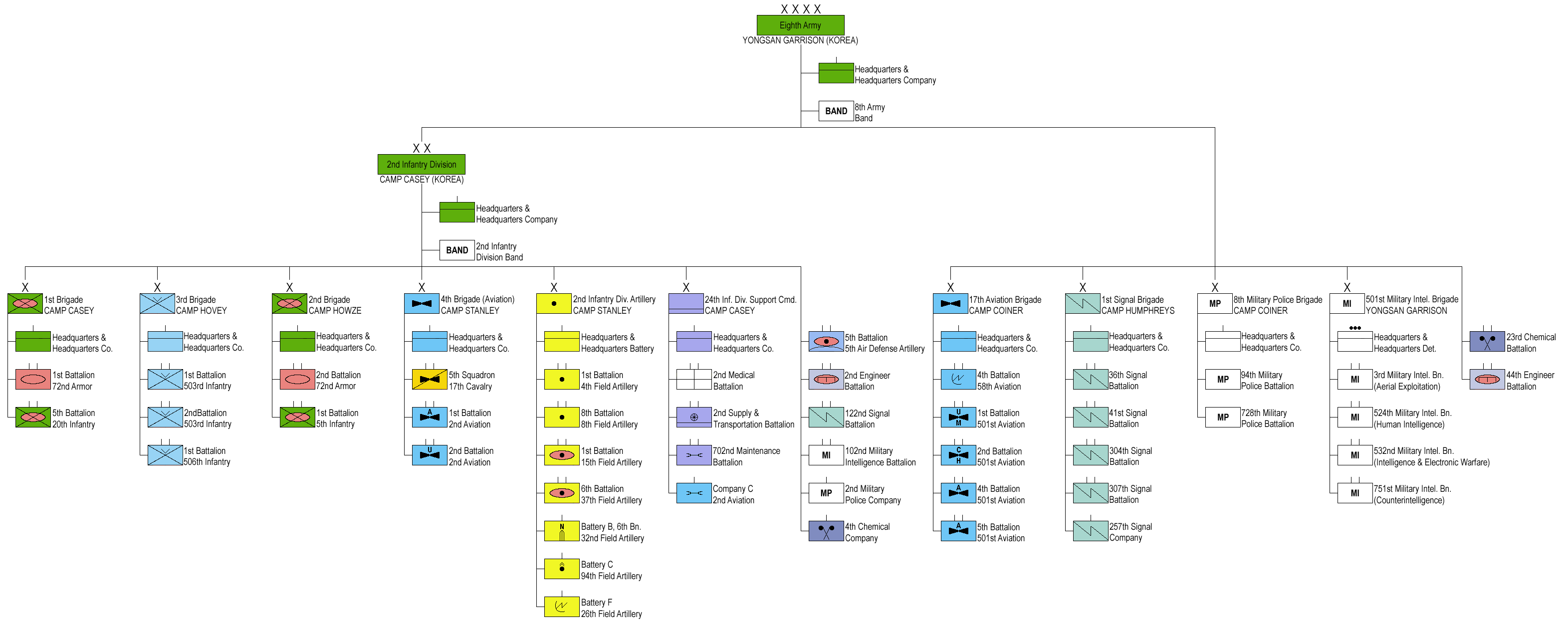
Organisation of Eighth Army in 1989 (click to enlarge)

At the end of the Cold War Eighth Army consisted of the following units:

- Eighth Army, Yongsan Garrison, South Korea
  - Headquarters & Headquarters Company
  - 2nd Infantry Division, Camp Casey
  - 17th Aviation Brigade, Camp Coiner
    - Headquarters & Headquarters Company
    - 4th Battalion, 58th Aviation (Air Traffic Control), Camp Coiner
    - 1st Battalion, 501st Aviation (Assault), Camp Coiner (UH-60A Black Hawk helicopters)
    - 2nd Battalion, 501st Aviation (Medium Lift), Camp Coiner (CH-47D Chinook helicopters)
    - 4th Battalion, 501st Aviation (Attack), Camp Page (AH-1F Cobra & OH-58C Kiowa helicopters)
    - 5th Battalion, 501st Aviation (Attack), Camp Coiner (AH-1F Cobra & OH-58C Kiowa helicopters)
  - 1st Signal Brigade, Camp Humphreys
    - Headquarters & Headquarters Company
    - 36th Signal Battalion
    - 41st Signal Battalion
    - 304th Signal Battalion, Camp Colbern
    - 307th Signal Battalion
    - 257th Signal Company, Camp Humphreys
  - 8th Military Police Brigade (Provisional), Camp Coiner
    - Headquarters & Headquarters Company
    - 94th Military Police Battalion
    - 728th Military Police Battalion
  - 501st Military Intelligence Brigade (Provisional), Yongsan Garrison
    - Headquarters & Headquarters Detachment
    - 3rd Military Intelligence Battalion (Aerial Exploitation), Camp Humphreys
    - 524th Military Intelligence Battalion (Human Intelligence)
    - 532nd Military Intelligence Battalion (Intelligence & Electronic Warfare)
    - 751st Military Intelligence Battalion (Counterintelligence), Camp Humphreys
  - 18th Medical Command, Seoul (the following peacetime listing is incomplete)
    - Headquarters and Headquarters Detachment
    - 52nd Medical Battalion
    - 121st Combat Support Hospital, Camp Humphreys
  - 19th Support Command, Daegu (the following peacetime listing is incomplete)
    - Headquarters and Headquarters Company
    - Special Troops Battalion
    - 20th Area Support Group, Camp Henry
      - Headquarters and Headquarters Company
    - 23rd Area Support Group, Camp Humphreys
      - Headquarters and Headquarters Company
      - 194th Maintenance Battalion
      - 227th Maintenance Battalion
      - Company A, 3rd Battalion 501st Aviation (Aviation Intermediate Maintenance), Camp Humphreys
      - Company A, 3rd Battalion, 501st Aviation (Aviation Intermediate Maintenance), Camp Humphreys
    - 25th Transportation Center (Movement Control), Yongsan Garrison
      - 21st Transportation Company (Command Transport), Yongsan Garrison
      - 46th Transportation Company, Camp Carroll
    - 34th Area Support Group, Seoul
      - Headquarters and Headquarters Company
    - 501st Corps Support Group, Camp Red Cloud
      - Headquarters and Headquarters Company
  - 8th Personnel Command
    - 516th Personnel Service Company
  - 175th Finance Center
    - 176th Finance Support Unit
    - 177th Finance Support Unit
  - 23rd Chemical Battalion
  - 44th Engineer Battalion (Combat) (Heavy), Camp Mercer
  - 8th Army Band

==== Recent times ====
In 2003, plans were announced to move the 2nd Infantry Division southward. The division, with 15 bases north of the Han River and just south of the DMZ, was to be the most important formation to be moved south of the Han River in two phases "over the next few years" a joint statement between the South Korean and U.S. governments said on June 5, 2003. As of 2015, it appears that one brigade of the 2nd Infantry Division will remain at Camp Casey, near Dongducheon.

The headquarters of the Eighth Army was Yongsan Garrison, but moved southward to Camp Humphreys by 2019. In April 2017 the Eighth Army headquarters began its move from Yongsan to Camp Humphreys and held a ceremony to relocate a statue of General Walton Walker.

== Organization ==
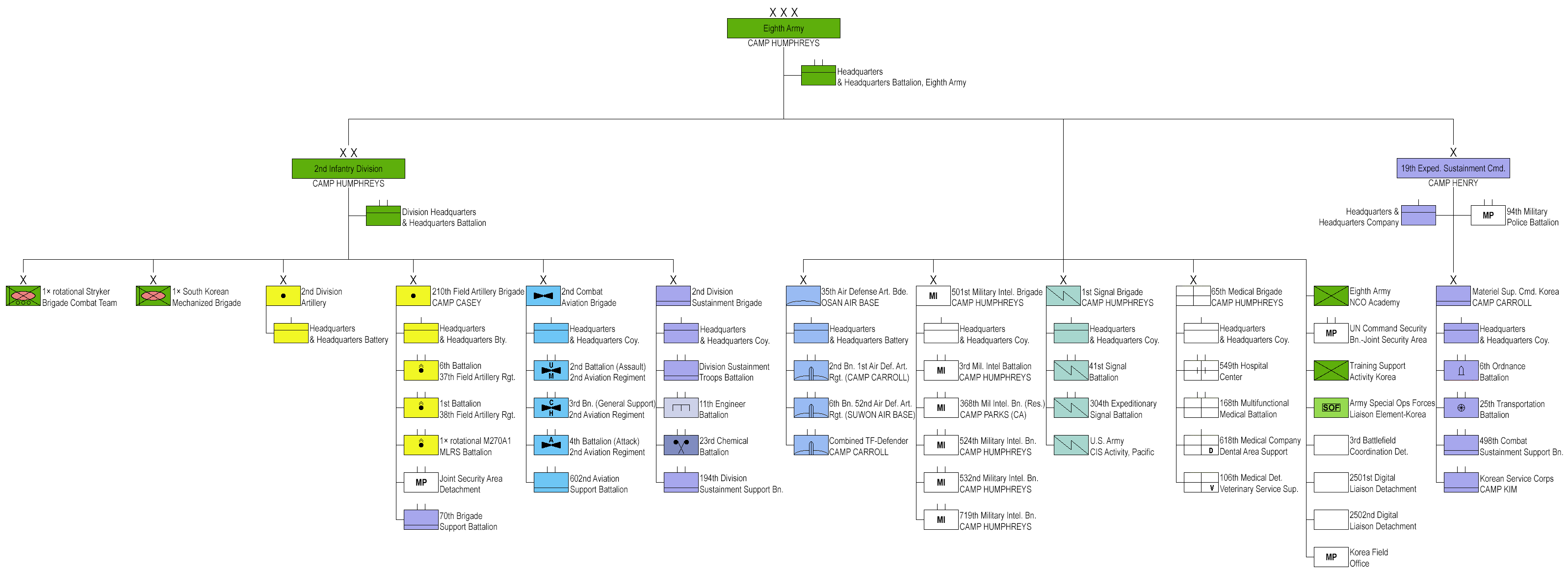
Eighth Army organization 2025

- Eighth Army, at Camp Humphreys
  - Headquarters and Headquarters Battalion, Eighth Army
    - Headquarters Support Company
    - Operations Company
    - Intelligence and Sustainment Company
    - Eighth Army Band
  - 2nd Infantry Division (ROK-US Combined Division), at Camp Humphreys
    - Division Headquarters and Headquarters Battalion, at Camp Humphreys
    - Rotational Stryker Brigade Combat Team, at Camp Hovey
    - 2nd Infantry Division Artillery, at Camp Humphreys
    - 210th Field Artillery Brigade, at Camp Casey
    - 2nd Combat Aviation Brigade, at Camp Humphreys
    - 2nd Infantry Division Sustainment Brigade, at Camp Humphreys
  - 35th Air Defense Artillery Brigade, at Osan Air Base (administratively subordinated to 94th Army Air and Missile Defense Command)
  - 501st Military Intelligence Brigade, at Camp Humphreys
  - 1st Signal Brigade, at Camp Humphreys (administratively subordinated to 311th Signal Command)
  - 65th Medical Brigade, at Camp Humphreys
  - 19th Expeditionary Sustainment Command, at Camp Henry
    - Materiel Support Command Korea, at Camp Carroll
  - United Nations Command Security Battalion-Joint Security Area
  - Korea Field Office
  - Army Special Operations Forces Liaison Element-Korea (ALE-K), at Camp Coiner
  - Eighth Army Non-Commissioned Officers Academy
  - 3rd Battlefield Coordination Detachment, at Osan Air Base
  - Training Support Activity Korea, at Camp Coiner
  - 2501st Digital Liaison Detachment, at Camp Yongin
  - 2502nd Digital Liaison Detachment, at Camp Henry

Other US Army units based in South Korea:

- 403rd Army Field Support Brigade, Camp Henry, part of Army Sustainment Command
  - Army Field Support Battalion - Korea
  - Army Field Support Battalion - Northeast Asia
- 837th Transportation Battalion, part of 599th Transportation Brigade / Military Surface Deployment and Distribution Command
- United States Army Medical Materiel Agency - Korea

=== Specific units ===
==== 8th Army Band ====
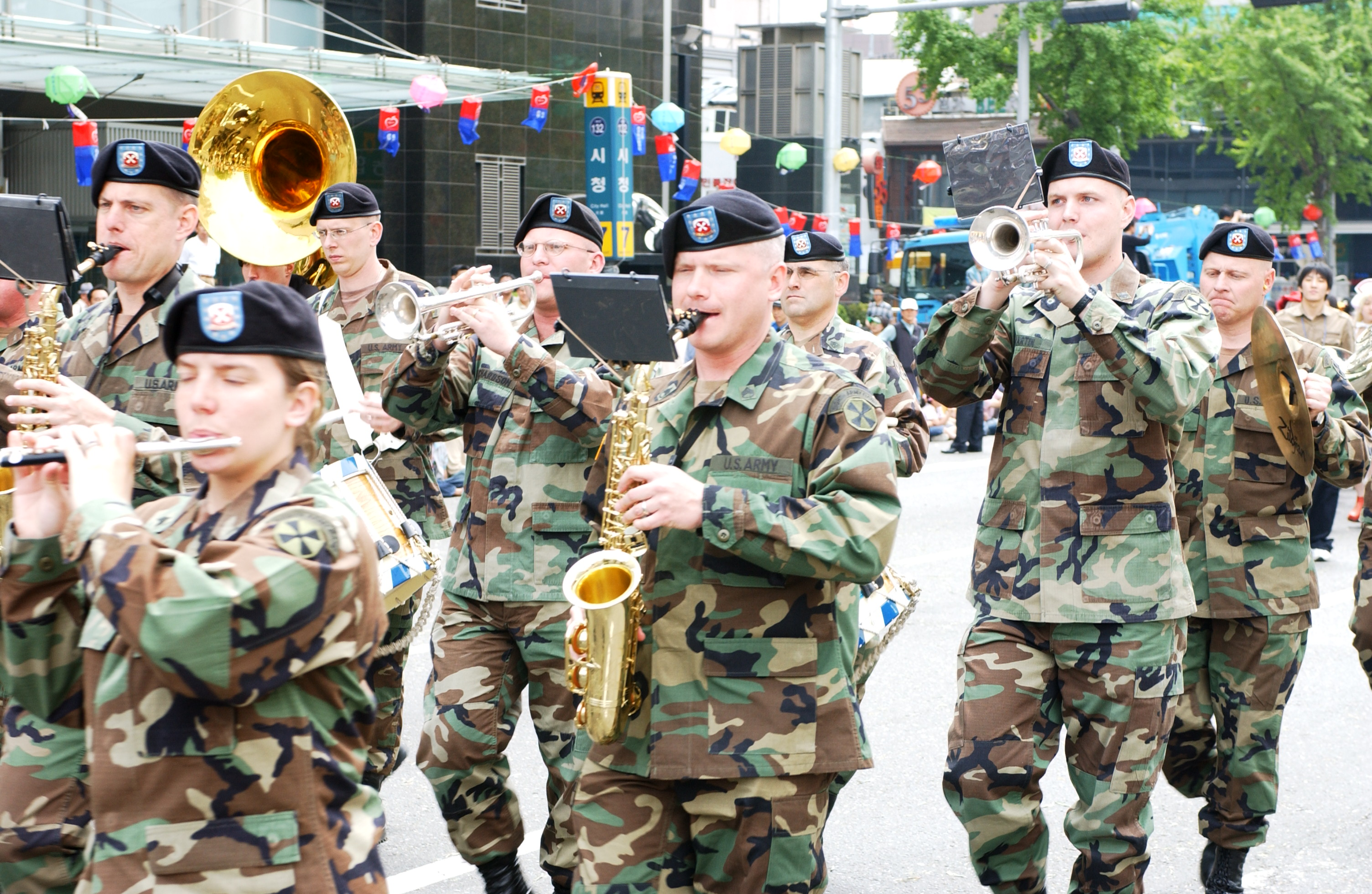
Soldiers of the 8th Army Band at a parade in downtown Seoul

The 8th Army Band is the official musical unit of the HQ 8th Army and supports United States Forces Korea and the United Nations Command. The 41-member band was founded in 1916 as the Band of the 35th Infantry Regiment. During World War II, the band, then known as the 25th Infantry Division Band based out of Hawaii, served in the Pacific Theater, being a participant in Central Pacific and Guadalcanal campaigns. It was reorganized in November 1950 and reassigned to the newly formed ROK, the same year the Korean War began. Awards and honors the band has received include the Meritorious Unit Commendation and two Republic of Korea Presidential Unit Citations. Nicknamed Freedom's Ambassadors due to its area of responsibility, it has performed at events such as the Wonju Tattoo, the Gangwon International Tattoo as well as Korean War memorial ceremonies in the country. In June, 2015, members of the 8th Army Band celebrated its 99th anniversary in Mongolia with a concert on Sükhbaatar Square.

==== Korean Service Corps ====
The Korean Service Corps was a reserve force composed of South Korean volunteers who were augmented to the 8th Army. They provided labourers who were used to carry ammunition and supplies, and support the overall logistic elements of the army. It is today, a paramilitary civilian formation that is battalion-sized. Continuing is role as a combat service support unit, it is capable of being expanded and mobilized during a wartime situation.

== Lineage and honors ==
- Constituted 2 June 1944 in the Army of the United States as Headquarters, Eighth Army
- Activated 10 June 1944 at Memphis, Tennessee
- Allotted 20 July 1951 to the Regular Army
- Reorganized and redesignated 1 December 1967 as Headquarters and Headquarters Company, Eighth Army
- Reorganized and redesignated 16 June 2008 as Operational Command Post, Headquarters, Eighth Army
- Reorganized and redesignated 16 June 2010 as Headquarters, Eighth Army
- Reorganized and redesignated 17 October 2011 as Headquarters and Headquarters Battalion, Eighth Army

=== Campaign participation credit ===
World War II

- New Guinea
- Leyte
- Luzon

Korean War

- UN Defensive
- UN Offensive
- CCF Intervention
- First UN Counteroffensive
- CCF Spring Offensive
- UN Summer-Fall Offensive
- Second Korean Winter
- Korea, Summer-Fall 1952
- Third Korean Winter
- Korea, Summer 1953

== Decorations ==
Ribbon	Award	Year	Notes
Dark blue ribbon with a gold border	Army Superior Unit Award	2020	Streamer embroidered 2020
Red ribbon	Philippine Presidential Unit Citation	1944–1945	Streamer embroidered 17 OCTOBER 1944 TO 4 JULY 1945
White ribbon with vertical green and red stripes on its edges and a red and blue circle in the middle	Presidential Unit Citation (Korea)	1950	Streamer embroidered KOREA 1950
White ribbon with vertical green and red stripes on its edges and a red and blue circle in the middle	Presidential Unit Citation (Korea)	1951–1952	Streamer embroidered KOREA 1951–1952
White ribbon with vertical green and red stripes on its edges and a red and blue circle in the middle	Presidential Unit Citation (Korea)	1952–1953	Streamer embroidered KOREA 1952–1953

== List of commanders ==
No.	Commander		Term		
No.	Portrait	Name	Took office	Left office	Term length
1	Robert L. Eichelberger	Lieutenant General; Robert L. Eichelberger (1886–1961)	1 June 1944	4 August 1948	4 years, 64 days
2	Walton Walker	Lieutenant General; Walton Walker (1889–1950)	4 August 1948	23 December 1950	2 years, 141 days
3	Matthew Ridgway	Lieutenant General; Matthew Ridgway (1895–1993)	25 December 1950	12 April 1951	108 days
4	James Van Fleet	General; James Van Fleet (1892–1992)	14 April 1951	11 February 1953	1 year, 303 days
5	Maxwell D. Taylor	General; Maxwell D. Taylor (1901–1987)	11 February 1953	25 March 1955	2 years, 42 days
6	Lyman Lemnitzer	General; Lyman Lemnitzer (1899–1988)	25 March 1955	5 June 1955	72 days
7	Isaac D. White	General; Isaac D. White (1901–1990)	25 June 1955	1 July 1957	2 years, 6 days
8	George Decker	General; George Decker (1902–1980)	1 July 1957	30 June 1959	1 year, 364 days
9	Carter B. Magruder	General; Carter B. Magruder (1900–1988)	1 July 1959	30 June 1961	1 year, 364 days
10	Guy S. Meloy	General; Guy S. Meloy (1903–1968)	1 July 1961	31 July 1963	2 years, 30 days
11	Hamilton H. Howze	General; Hamilton H. Howze (1908–1998)	1 August 1963	15 June 1965	1 year, 318 days
12	Dwight E. Beach	General; Dwight E. Beach (1908–2000)	16 June 1965	31 August 1966	1 year, 76 days
13	Charles H. Bonesteel III	General; Charles H. Bonesteel III (1909–1977)	1 September 1966	30 September 1969	3 years, 29 days
14	John H. Michaelis	General; John H. Michaelis (1912–1985)	1 October 1969	31 August 1972	2 years, 335 days
15	Donald V. Bennett	General; Donald V. Bennett (1915–2005)	1 September 1972	31 July 1973	333 days
16	Richard G. Stilwell	General; Richard G. Stilwell (1917–1991)	1 August 1973	8 October 1976	3 years, 68 days
17	John W. Vessey Jr.	General; John W. Vessey Jr. (1922–2016)	8 October 1976	10 July 1979	2 years, 275 days
18	John A. Wickham Jr.	General; John A. Wickham Jr. (1928–2024)	10 July 1979	4 June 1982	2 years, 329 days
19	Robert W. Sennewald	General; Robert W. Sennewald (1929–2023)	4 June 1982	1 June 1984	1 year, 363 days
20	William J. Livsey	General; William J. Livsey (1931–2016)	1 June 1984	25 June 1987	3 years, 24 days
21	Louis C. Menetrey Jr.	General; Louis C. Menetrey Jr. (1929–2009)	25 June 1987	26 June 1990	3 years, 1 day
22	Robert W. RisCassi	General; Robert W. RisCassi (born 1936)	26 June 1990	1 December 1992	2 years, 158 days
23	William W. Crouch	Lieutenant General; William W. Crouch (born 1941)	1 December 1992	18 October 1994	1 year, 321 days
24	Richard F. Timmons	Lieutenant General; Richard F. Timmons (born 1942)	19 October 1994	31 July 1997	2 years, 285 days
25	Randolph W. House	Lieutenant General; Randolph W. House (born 1949)	1 August 1997	25 September 1998	1 year, 55 days
26	Daniel J. Petrosky	Lieutenant General; Daniel J. Petrosky (born 1944)	25 September 1998	28 September 2000	2 years, 3 days
27	Daniel R. Zanini	Lieutenant General; Daniel R. Zanini (born 1946)	28 September 2000	6 November 2002	2 years, 39 days
28	Charles C. Campbell	Lieutenant General; Charles C. Campbell (1948–2016)	6 November 2002	10 April 2006	3 years, 155 days
29	David P. Valcourt	Lieutenant General; David P. Valcourt (born 1951)	11 April 2006	17 February 2008	1 year, 312 days
30	Joseph F. Fil Jr.	Lieutenant General; Joseph F. Fil Jr. (born 1953)	18 February 2008	19 November 2010	2 years, 274 days
31	John D. Johnson	Lieutenant General; John D. Johnson (born 1952)	9 November 2010	26 June 2013	2 years, 229 days
32	Bernard S. Champoux	Lieutenant General; Bernard S. Champoux (born 1954)	27 June 2013	2 February 2016	2 years, 220 days
33	Thomas S. Vandal	Lieutenant General; Thomas S. Vandal (1960–2018)	2 February 2016	5 January 2018	1 year, 337 days
34	Michael A. Bills	Lieutenant General; Michael A. Bills (born 1958)	5 January 2018	2 October 2020	2 years, 271 days
35	Willard Burleson	Lieutenant General; Willard Burleson (born 1965)	2 October 2020	5 April 2024	3 years, 186 days
36	Christopher LaNeve	Lieutenant General; Christopher LaNeve	5 April 2024	16 April 2025	1 year, 11 days
–	D. Sean Crockett	Brigadier General; D. Sean Crockett; Acting	16 April 2025	12 August 2025	118 days
–	William D. Taylor	Major General; William D. Taylor; Acting	12 August 2025	23 October 2025	72 days
37	Joseph E. Hilbert	Lieutenant General; Joseph E. Hilbert	23 October 2025	Incumbent	1 year, 13 days
