= Camp Sears =

Former U.S. army base in South Korea

Camp Sears was a United States Army base located less than two miles (3 km) outside the city of Uijongbu, approximately 20 miles (32 km) north of Seoul. The 32-acre (130,000 m^{2}) installation housed military personnel assigned to the Headquarters Battery of 5-5 ADA (Air Defense Artillery) composed mostly of combat support troops. The installation was home to a single combat arms platoon of air defense scouts known as EWSO (Early Warning System Operator), which provided early warning air defense for the 2nd Infantry Division.

Camp Sears was closed along with several other camps in South Korea as part of a downsizing of forces. The land was returned to the South Korean government.

== See also ==
- List of United States Army installations in South Korea
