= Frederick F. Henry =

Frederick Funston Henry
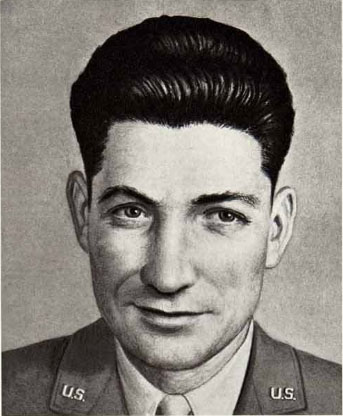
- Born: September 23, 1919; Vian, Oklahoma, United States
- Died: September 1, 1950 (aged 30); Naktong Bulge, near Andong, Korea
- Burial place: National Memorial Cemetery of the Pacific
- Military career
- Allegiance: United States
- Branch: United States Army
- Service years: 1940–1950
- Rank: First Lieutenant
- Units: 38th Infantry Regiment, 2nd Infantry Division
- Conflicts: World War II; Korean War: Battle of Pusan Perimeter; Second Battle of Naktong Bulge †
- Awards: Medal of Honor; Bronze Star Medal (2); Purple Heart (2)

Frederick Funston Henry (September 23, 1919 – September 1, 1950) was a United States Army officer and a posthumous recipient of the United States military's highest decoration, the Medal of Honor, for his actions during the Second Battle of Naktong Bulge in the Korean War.

== Military career ==
Henry joined the United States Army from Clinton, Oklahoma, in September 1940, a week before his 21st birthday. During World War II, he served in the Pacific. By September 1, 1950, he was serving as a first lieutenant in Company F of the 38th Infantry Regiment. On that day, near Andong, Korea, his platoon was attacked by a numerically superior enemy force. Although seriously wounded, Henry ordered his men to withdraw while he stayed behind to cover their retreat. He single-handedly held the attackers at bay until being killed. For these actions, he was posthumously awarded the Medal of Honor five months later, on February 16, 1951.

Henry's official Medal of Honor citation reads:

1st Lt. Henry, Company F, distinguished himself by conspicuous gallantry and intrepidity above and beyond the call of duty in action. His platoon was holding a strategic ridge near the town when they were attacked by a superior enemy force, supported by heavy mortar and artillery fire. Seeing his platoon disorganized by this fanatical assault, he left his foxhole and moving along the line ordered his men to stay in place and keep firing. Encouraged by this heroic action the platoon reformed a defensive line and rained devastating fire on the enemy, checking its advance. Enemy fire had knocked out all communications and 1st Lt. Henry was unable to determine whether or not the main line of resistance was alerted to this heavy attack. On his own initiative, although severely wounded, he decided to hold his position as long as possible and ordered the wounded evacuated and their weapons and ammunition brought to him. Establishing a l-man defensive position, he ordered the platoon's withdrawal and despite his wound and with complete disregard for himself remained behind to cover the movement. When last seen he was single-handedly firing all available weapons so effectively that he caused an estimated 50 enemy casualties. His ammunition was soon expended and his position overrun, but this intrepid action saved the platoon and halted the enemy's advance until the main line of resistance was prepared to throw back the attack. 1st Lt. Henry's outstanding gallantry and noble self-sacrifice above and beyond the call of duty reflect the highest honor on him and are in keeping with the esteemed traditions of the U.S. Army.

== Awards and decorations ==

Badge	Combat Infantryman Badge		
1st row	Medal of Honor		Bronze Star Medal with 1 Oak leaf cluster
2nd row	Purple Heart with 1 Oak leaf cluster	Army Good Conduct Medal	American Defense Service Medal
3rd row	American Campaign Medal	Asiatic-Pacific Campaign Medal with 2 Campaign stars	World War II Victory Medal
4th row	Army of Occupation Medal with 'Germany' clasp	National Defense Service Medal	Korean Service Medal with 1 Campaign star
5th row	Philippine Liberation Medal with 1 Campaign star	United Nations Service Medal Korea	Korean War Service Medal Retroactively Awarded, 2003
Unit Awards	Philippine Presidential Unit Citation		Korean Presidential Unit Citation

== Legacy ==
In May 1960, a U.S. Army facility in Daegu, South Korea, was renamed Camp Henry in his honor. A memorial to Henry was unveiled in Annabelle Farmer Park, Vian, in October 2004.

== See also ==
- List of Korean War Medal of Honor recipients
