= Camp Carroll, South Korea =

American military base in South Korea

Coordinates: 35.996°N 128.416°E

Camp Carroll
- Chilgok County, Waegwan, Gyeongbuk Province, South Korea
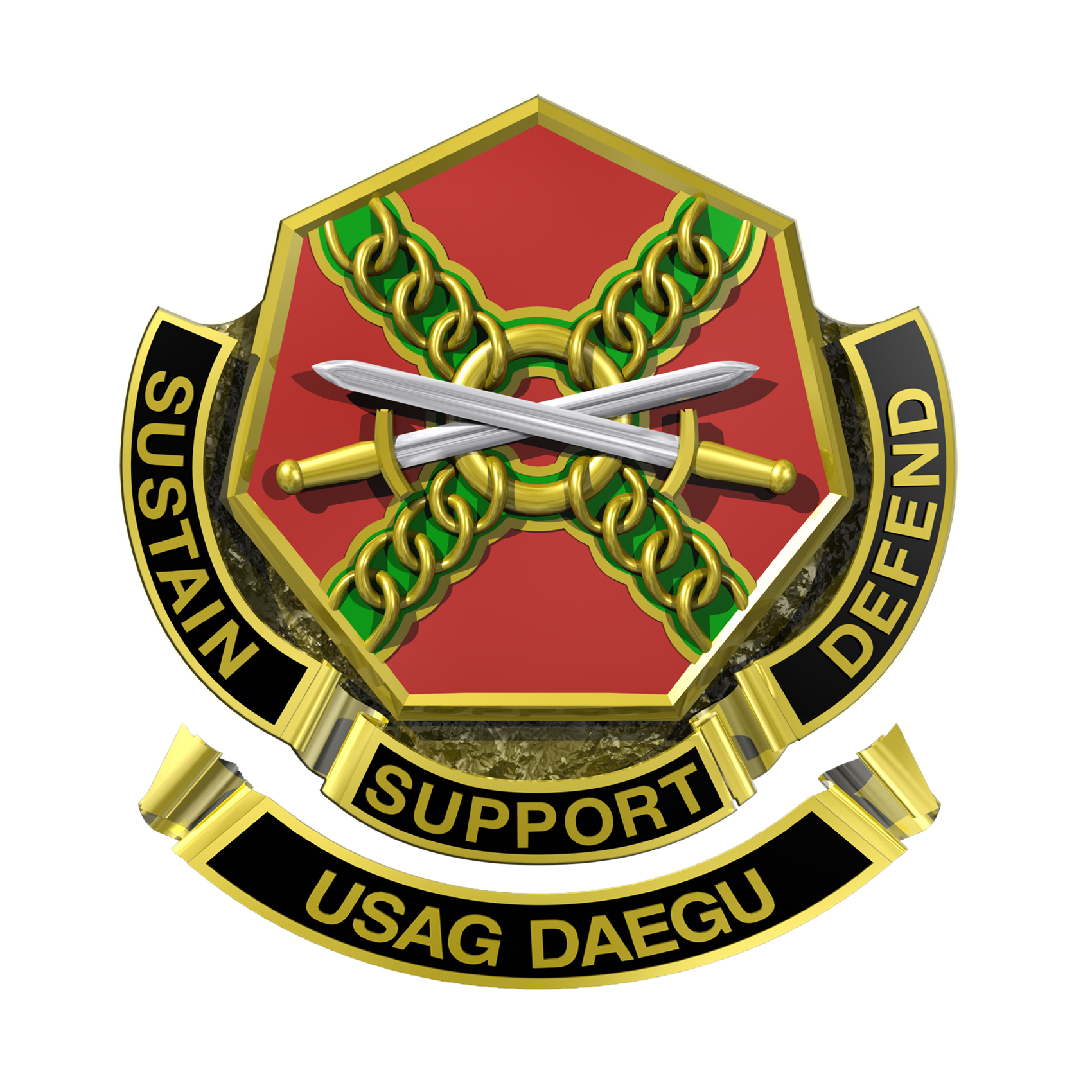
- Official crest of United States Army Garrison Daegu

Site information
- Type: Army post
- Owner: United States; South Korea
- Controlled by: United States Army

Site history
- Built: May 1959
- In use: May 1959 – present

Camp Carroll Army Base (Korean: 캠프 캐럴) is located on the southeast portion of the peninsula of South Korea, in the village of Waegwan, approximately 20 km from the city of Daegu. Camp Carroll is bound by urban areas on the northwest, west, and southwest. Hilly forested areas bound the base on the north and east. Agricultural fields (mostly rice paddies) border the base on the northeast and to the south. The Nakdong River flows nearby, southwest of the base. Camp Carroll has been a supply staging ground for U.S. military operations on the peninsula and in the Far East since the late 1950s. Often referred to as "The Crown Jewel of Area 4", it is named after Sergeant First Class Charles F. Carroll, a posthumous recipient of the Distinguished Service Cross for his acts of heroism during the Korean War.

The area immediately surrounding Camp Carroll is mainly made up of service businesses (e.g. dry cleaners, barber shops, Bars), and caters to an equally American and Philippine crowd, as many of the soldiers are American and many of the women are Philippine. The city itself is a short bus ride from Daegu and Gumi.

Though small in size, Camp Carroll holds a population of approximately 1500 servicemen. The population itself consists of Eighth Army personnel, employees and contractors, and Korean Augmentation to the U.S. Army (KATUSA) soldiers. Warehouses and lots make up a large portion of the location, because one of its main functions is to house war reserve stocks. Camp Carroll is also home to The 2nd Battalion, 1st Air Defense Artillery Regiment (Patriot).

== Amenities ==
Amenities include AAFES Exchange, AMCSS (Army Military Clothing Sales Store), commissary, outdoor swimming pool, library, community center, and a movie theater.

== Transportation ==
The military operates a shuttle bus between Camp Walker, Daegu and Camp Carroll but the civilian bus terminal nearest to the post can be accessed by the local 10 and 110 services, which originate in Gumi, and the 250 service, which terminates in Daegu. By rail, Waegwan Station can be accessed by Mugunghwa (무궁화) rail service. Saemaul (새마을) service is once or twice a day to Daegu or Seoul. KTX trains do not service this station.

== History ==
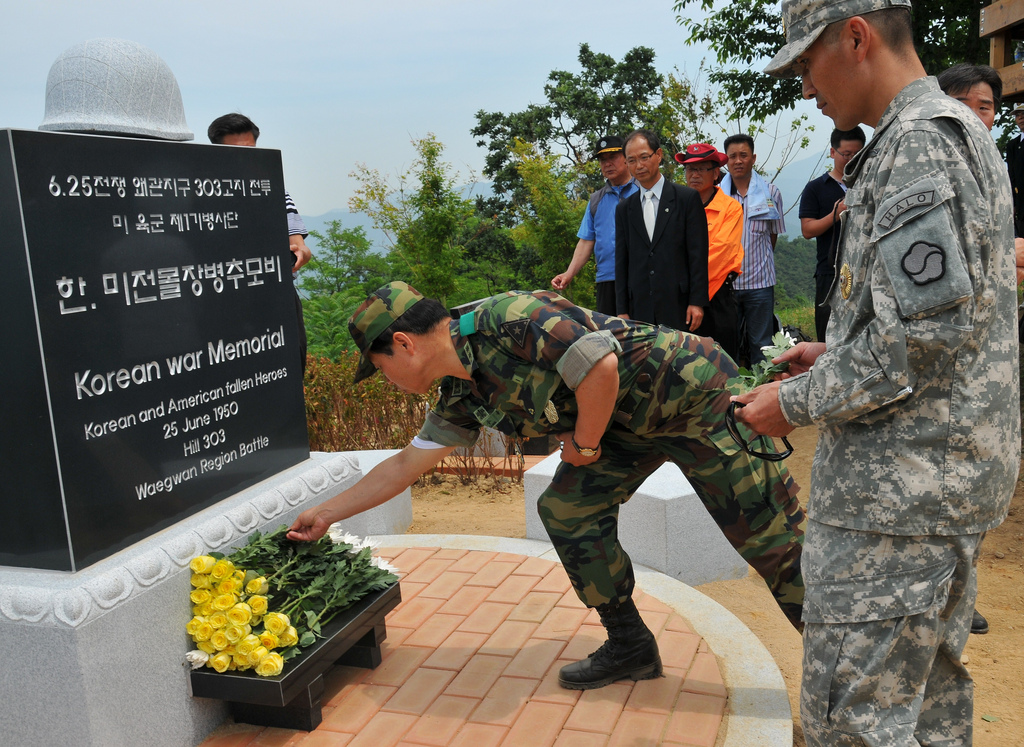
U.S. and ROKA soldiers lay roses at the foot of the memorial established on Hill 303.

Camp Carroll lies in the evening shadow of Hill 303 where one of the most notorious atrocities of the Korean War was committed by communist forces. Forty-one soldiers from the 1st Cav. Div. were captured on the hill during the attempt to break through communist lines during the early days of the Pusan Perimeter. Evidence shows that these men were bound and shot in the back. Shortly after this, the United Nations Command dropped nearly 1,330 tons of high explosives onto the communist lines near Waegwan and, with the second front opening at the communist rear after the landing at Inchon, the 1st Cav. Div. recaptured Hill 303.

Camp Carroll is the only military post located in the Waegwan area since Japanese forces maintained a replacement depot here some 40 years ago.

=== Controversy ===
In May 2011 an interview with three United States Forces Korea veterans revealed that in 1978 approximately 250 55 gallon drums of chemicals believed to be Agent Orange were buried at Camp Carroll. On 22 May 2011, the Eighth Army admitted that chemicals, pesticides, herbicides, and solvents had been buried at Camp Carroll in 1978, but that the materials and 60 tons of dirt were subsequently removed in 1979 and 1980. A joint US-ROK investigation was concluded on 20 December 2011, finding that there was absolutely no Agent Orange remaining buried on Camp Carroll.

== See also ==
- List of United States Army installations in South Korea
- PFC Melvin L. Brown
