= Palgeocheon =

Watercourse in South Korea

Palgeocheon (Korean: 팔거천) is a stream that originates in Chilgok County, North Gyeongsang Province, South Korea, and flows to the Kumho River at Paldal-dong.
