= 403rd Army Field Support Brigade =

403d Army Field Support Brigade (AFSB)
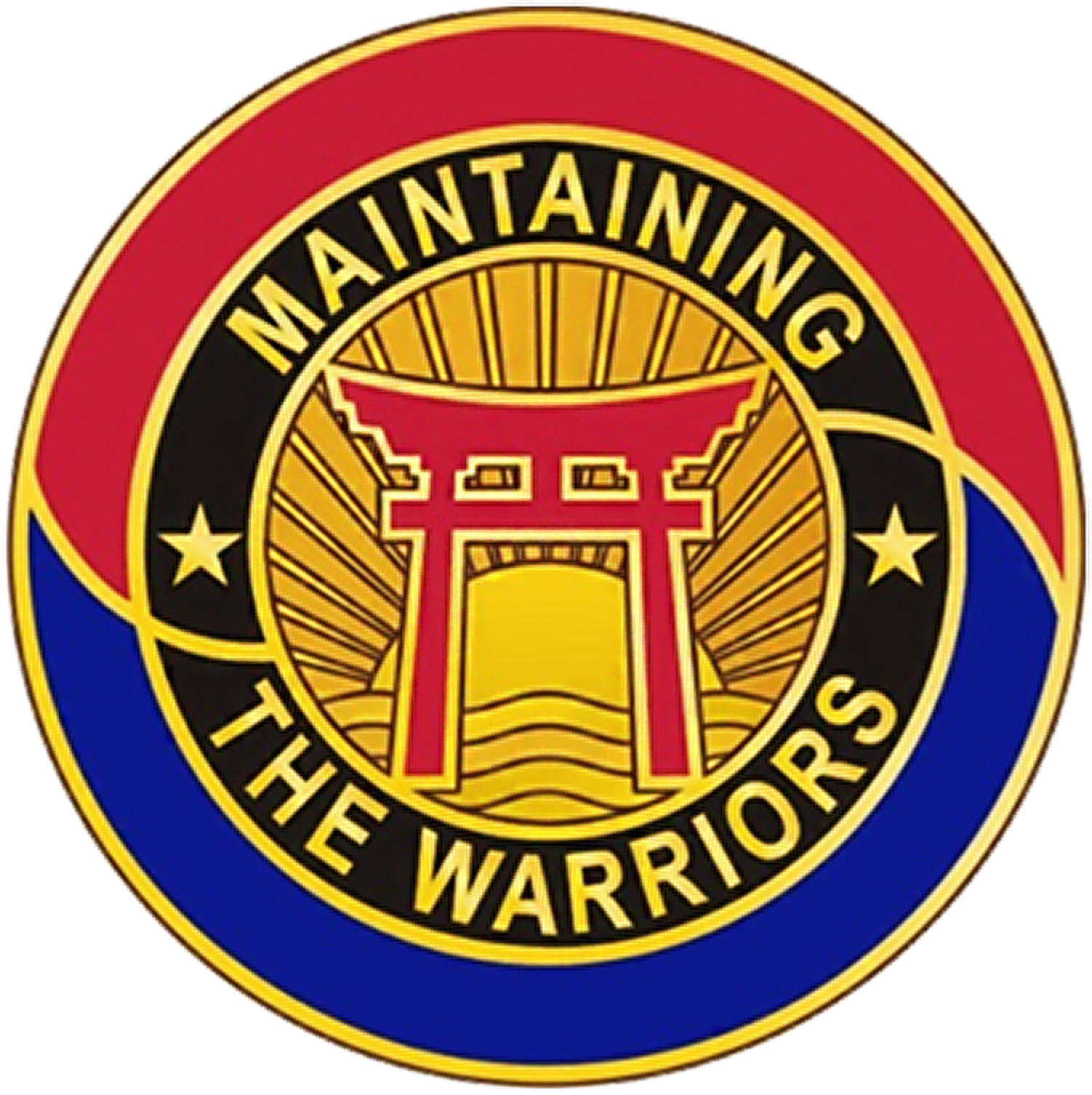
- Active: 17 October 2007 - present
- Country: United States
- Branch: United States Army
- Type: Support brigade
- Role: Support
- Size: Brigade
- Part of: Eighth United States Army
- Garrison/HQ: Camp Henry, Daegu, ROK
- Motto: Maintaining The Warriors

Commanders
- Current commander: COL Henry C. Brown
- Command Sergeant Major: CSM Cedric D. Harvey

Insignia
- Current SSI United States Army Materiel Command

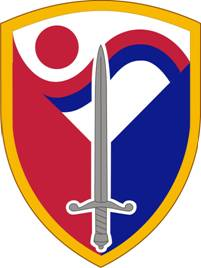
- Former Unit SSI 2008-2010

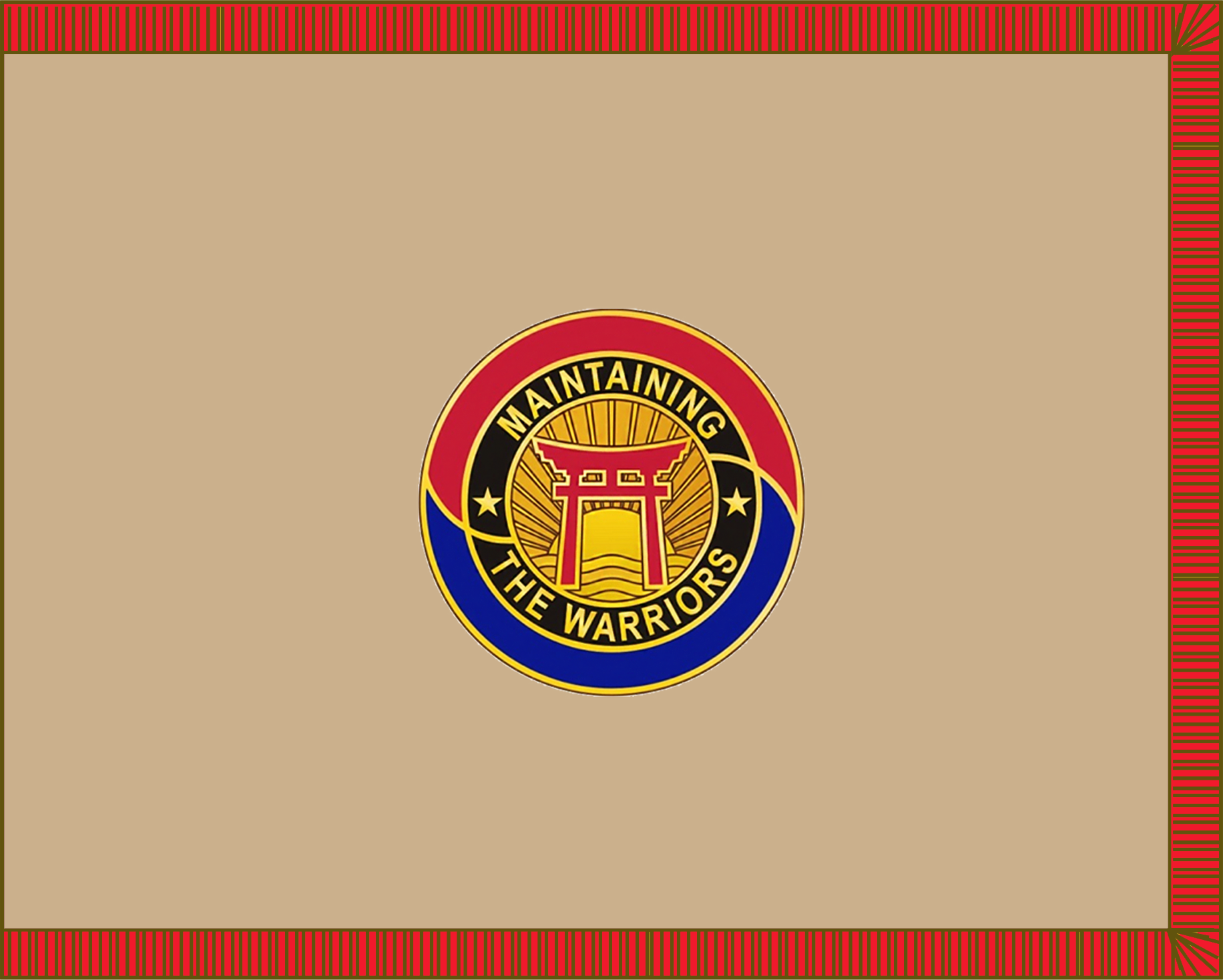
- 403rd Army Field Support Brigade Flag

403d Army Field Support Brigade (AFSB), headquartered at Camp Henry, Daegu, Republic of Korea, delivers U.S. Army Materiel Enterprise to supported forces throughout the Korean and Japanese Theaters of Operations and provides direct logistics support to Eighty Army, U.S. Forces Korea, U.S. Forces Japan and the 2nd Infantry Division/ROK U.S. Combined Division.

The 403d AFSB and its subordinate units provide Tactical, Operation, and Strategic-level support to forces throughout the Region to include acquisition, logistics and technology-related sustainment support to Army, joint, and multinational forces, as well as other government agencies as directed by the Army Sustainment Command (ASC), the Army Materiel Command (AMC), and supported Senior Commanders.

== Organization ==
- 403rd Army Field Support Brigade, at Camp Henry (South Korea)
  - Army Field Support Battalion-Korea (AFSBn-Korea), at Camp Humphreys (South Korea)
  - Army Field Support Battalion-Northeast Asia (AFSBn-NEA), at Camp Carroll (South Korea)

== History ==
In April 1986 the Logistics Assistance Office-Far East (LAO-FE) was established as an Army Materiel Command (AMC) asset in the U.S. Pacific Command (PACOM). In July 1987, LAO-FE was renamed Army Materiel Command Far East (AMC-FE) with the mission of managing AMC units in PACOM and serving as the AMC center for logistics and readiness in support of US Army Pacific (USARPAC), US Army Japan (USARJ), and 8th US Army (EUSA).

In 1988, AMC-FE was organized under the Logistics Assistance Program Activity (LAPA) and subsequently assigned to the Logistics Support Activity (LOGSA).

In October 1994, Army Materiel Command Logistics Support Element-Far East (AMC LSE-FE) was established at Camp Market, Korea in support of Army Service Component Commanders (ASCC) in PACOM. During this time, the management of the War Reserve Stocks (WRS), Depot Support Activity Far East (DSAFE) and other logistics assets within PACOM were under direct management of various AMC staff sections and organizations.

In 2000, AMC reorganized again and placed AMC-LSE-FE under direct control of the Operational Support Command (OSC), headquartered in Rock Island Arsenal, Illinois which in 2002 became the US Army Field Support Command (AFSC) which became the Army Sustainment Command (ASC) in 2006. As a result of the transformation in 2000, AMC-LSE-FE was again renamed in 2001 to AMC Forward-Far East (AMC-FWD-FE) which saw the unit regain oversight for all AMC activities in PACOM to include Combat Equipment Battalion-Northeast Asia (CEB-NEA) and Depot Support Activity Far East (DSAFE).

On 1 May 2005, AMC FWD-FE was re-designated as the Army Field Support Brigade-Far East (AFSB-FE) and subsequently renamed the 403d Army Field Support Brigade (Provisional) on 16 October 2007. This was the result of a year-long effort to reorganize AMC-FWD-FE into a brigade structure. In conjunction with the ongoing transformation of Army forces, AFSB-FE also transformed and restructured its Logistics Assistance Offices into Logistics Support Elements (LSEs) and Brigade Logistics Support Teams (BLSTs) in order to provide modular support to USARPAC, USARJ and the Eighth Army. The AFSB-FE continued to plan and execute contingency operations in major exercises as well as deploying numerous individuals in support of Operations Enduring and Iraqi Freedom, while at the same time maintaining logistics support to the PACOM theater.

Effective 16 October 2008, the organization formally became, the 403d Army Field Support Brigade, with an approved MTOE and TDA. On 1 October 2012, the Installation Management Command (IMCOM) Director of Logistics (DOL) resources and personnel in Korea and Japan transferred to the 403d AFSB with the mission of providing logistical support encompassing supply and services, transportation, and maintenance services to all regional and garrison forces including dependents.

Several Logistics Readiness Centers (LRC) report to the 403rd FSB including LRC-North at Camp Casey, LRC-Honshu at Camp Zama, LRC-Daegu at Camp Walker and LRC-Okinawa at Torii Station and provide maintenance, supply and transportation to the garrisons they support.

== Former Commanders ==
From	To	Commander
2007	2009	COL Andre Q. Fletcher
2009	2011	COL Barry A. Diehl
2011	2013	COL Michael C. Lopez
2013	2015	COL Jordan S. Chroman
2015	2017	COL Michael B. Siegl
2017	2019	COL Renee Mann
2019	2021	COL Wheeler R. Manning
2021	2023	COL Lisa A. Villarreal-Rennard
2023	present	COL Henry C. Brown
