= Command Post Tango =

US Forces Korea military bunker complex in South Korea

Command Post TANGO
- Part of ROK/US Combined Forces Command
- Seongnam, Gyeonggi Province in South Korea
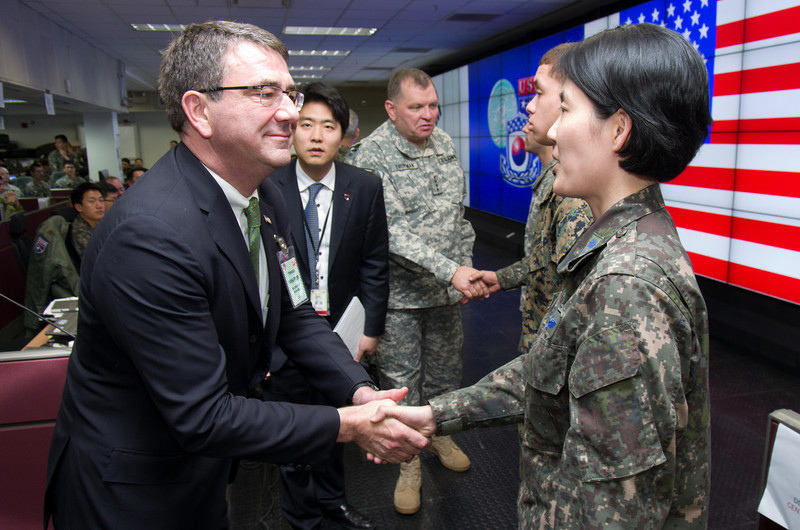
- Ash Carter visits in 2013

Site information
- Type: Bunker
- Code: TANGO
- Operator: United States Forces Korea
- Open to the public: No
- Condition: In active

Site history
- Built: 1970s
- Built by: United States Forces Korea
- Materials: Granite

Command Post Tango (CP TANGO) is a United States Forces Korea's military bunker complex in South Korea. It is the Theater Command Post for the Combatant Commander, UNC/CFC/USFK and State Department Korea and can reportedly withstand a tactical nuclear weapon through the use of several layers of blast doors. It is located in Seongnam, Gyeonggi province.

== Info ==
Condoleezza Rice visited the bunker in her March 2005 trip to six Asian nations as well as the President of South Korea Lee Myung-Bak. Lee Myung-Bak also visited the bunker in August 2008.

Numerous outer resources of this facility include a water treatment operations center, living quarters, several helicopter landing zones, container storage area, equipment, and facility supply storage area, operations location for the fire department, Emergency Response Center, and other structures, including buildings for external armed security personnel, Directorate of Public Works personnel, Korean Service Corps personnel, Installation Facility Management, communications personnel, and a live fire range with range personnel.

TANGO stands for Theater Air Naval Ground Operations Center. The Command Post was built right after the Korean War and is one of several Command Posts scattered across the globe in Europe, America, Hawaii, and the far east. The bunker is set to be given to the ROK Army as American forces pull back to Camp Humphreys.
