= Camp Kim =

Military facility adjacent to Yongson Garrison, Seoul, South Korea

Coordinates: 37°32′24″N 126°58′23″E

Camp Kim was a military facility located adjacent to Yongsan Garrison in Seoul, South Korea. Camp Kim was home to a USO facility, an Army and Air Force Exchange Service (AAFES) distribution and storage facility, an AAFES vehicle repair facility, the Special Operations Command Korea, and the Yongsan Garrison office for vehicle registration and decals.

The USO facility consists of a canteen, tour and ticket office, the Virtues Development Program, the Good Neighbor Program, a big screen television lounge. The Virtues Development Program and the Good Neighbor Program are both Community Outreach Programs designed to promote cross-cultural understanding through English education for Korean school-age children.

As of November 2018, it is in the process of being closed and being converted into a park.

== See also ==
- List of United States Army installations in South Korea
