= Korean Service Corps =

The Korean Service Corps Battalion (KSCB), also simply known as the Korean Service Corps (KSC), and formerly the Civilian Transportation Corps (CTC), is a flagged battalion of the United States Army, commanded by a U.S. Army lieutenant colonel. The battalion consists of 17 companies spread across the southern Korean Peninsula to augment on-peninsula United States forces.

== Mission ==
The primary role of the Civilian Transportation Corps, and later the Korean Service Corps, was to supplement Eighth United States Army supply logistics so that more effort could be dedicated to the front lines of the Korean War. Since the armistice that halted the Korean War to modern times, the KSC has aided the United States Army and the Republic of Korea (ROK) Army in non-wartime operations and training exercises while providing materiel support.

The KSC also serve as suppliers and auxiliary paramilitary forces for already on-peninsula U.S. Army forces until reinforcements arrive should another conflict between North and South Korea break out.

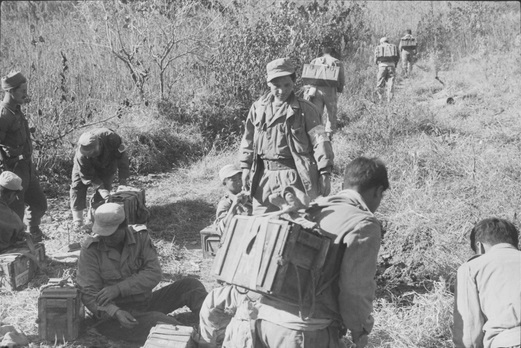
South Korean porters supporting the 3rd Battalion, Royal Australian Regiment, November 1951.

== History ==
In the second month of the Korean War, Eighth U.S. Army commander Lt. Gen. Walton H. Walker was faced by a severe shortage of strength and supplies along the Busan perimeter, and requested urgent backup from the Republic of Korea Army (ROKA), which was later answered on the 25th of July, 1950, by then-President of South Korea, Syngman Rhee, with the signing of an emergency decree directing ROK Army forces to provide civilian supply carriers to front line units. Eventually these carriers were organized into a centralized commanded battalion as the Civilian Transportation Corps (CTC) on March 15, 1951. Under the direction of General James Van Fleet, the CTC was later renamed to the Korean Service Corps (KSC) on July 14, 1951.

In modern times, The KSC has become known as the KSC Battalion and its 17 companies continue to be part of the U.S Army operating within the Korean Peninsula.
