= Camp Liberty Bell =

Camp in the Korean demilitarized zone

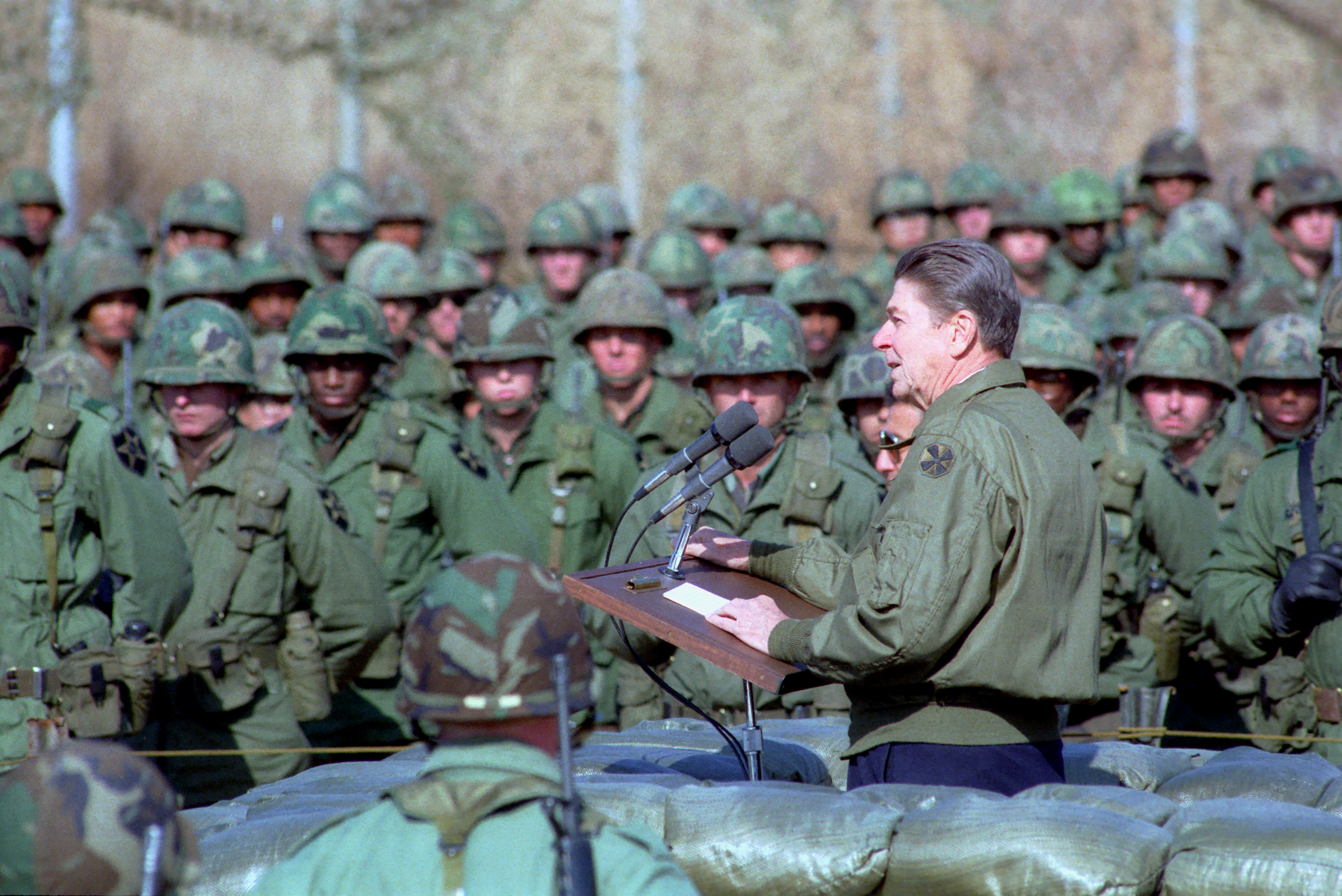

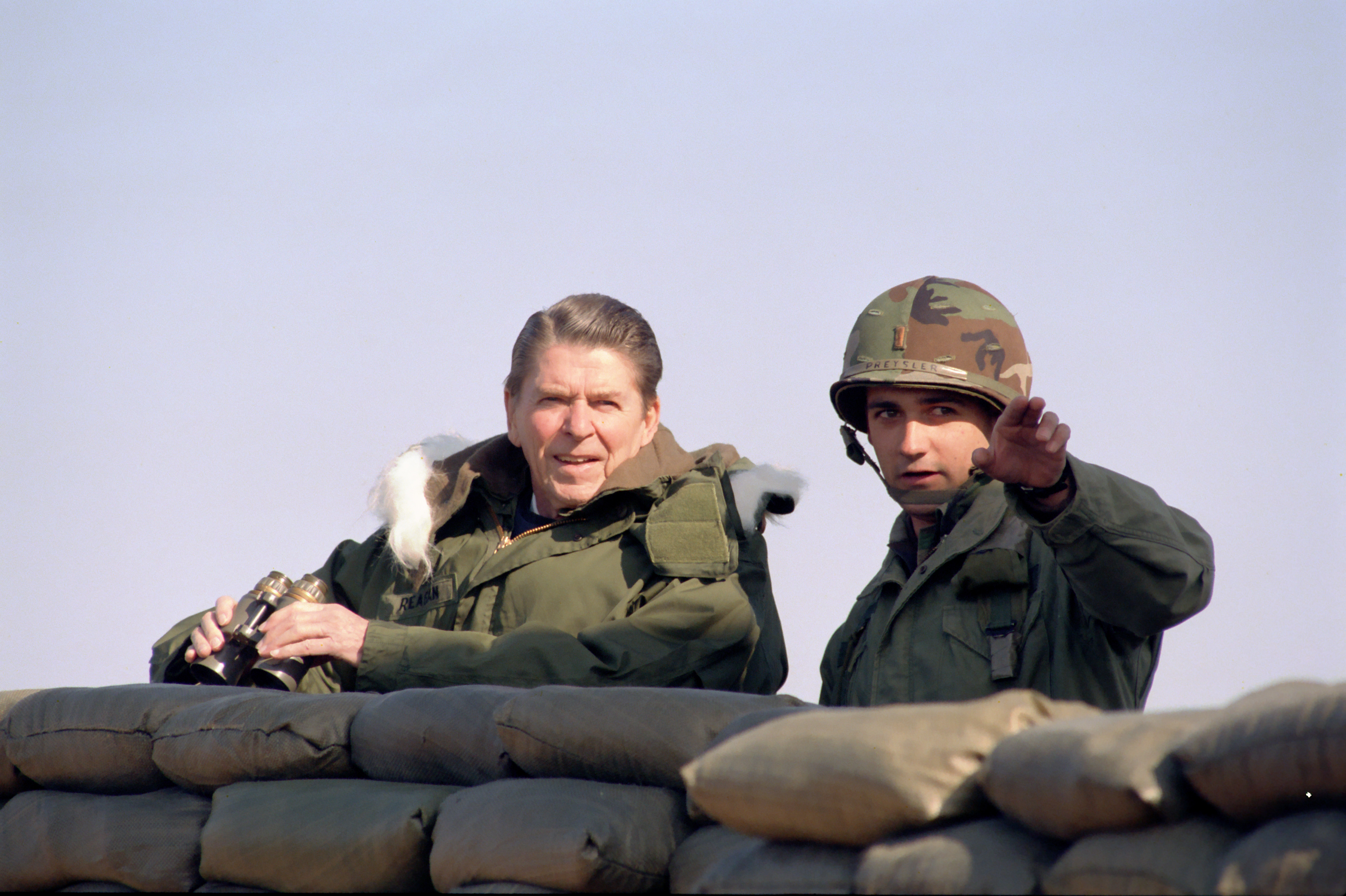

Camp Liberty Bell was a strategic location within the Korean DMZ which, during its existence, was America's northernmost command location in South Korea. In August 1976, North Korean troops attacked the camp causing several casualties.

Liberty Bell was home to Company A, 2/9th Infantry Regiment (Manchus), which patrolled the DMZ and the American-controlled section of the southern boundary. In April of 1987 this unit was redesignated as Company A, 1/506th Infantry Regiment (Currahees).

Then-president Ronald Reagan visited the Camp in November 1983 when he was the first president to visit the DMZ.

== See also ==
- Camp Bonifas
