= 2nd Battalion, 1st Air Defense Artillery Regiment =

US military unit

2nd Battalion, 1st Air Defense Artillery
- Distinctive Unit Insignia
- Active: 1812
- Country: United States
- Branch: Army
- Type: Air Defense Artillery
- Size: Battalion
- Part of: 35th Air Defense Artillery Brigade
- Garrison/HQ: Camp Carroll, South Korea
- Motto: Stand or Die!
- Mascot: The Guardian
- Equipment: Patriot Missile System

The 2nd Battalion, 1st Air Defense Artillery Regiment (2-1st ADAR) is a battalion in the 1st Air Defense Artillery Regiment, a regiment in the United States Army, first formed in 1812, and based in South Korea.

== Lineage ==
Constituted 11 January 1812 in the Regular Army as a company in the 3d Regiment of Artillery

Organized in July 1812 at Fort Columbus, New York, as Captain Ichabod B. Crane's Company, 3d Regiment of Artillery

Reorganized and redesignated 12 May 1814 as Captain Ichabod B. Crane's Company, Corps of Artillery

Redesignated 17 May 1815 as Captain Ichabod B. Crane's Company, Corps of Artillery, Northern Division

Redesignated 17 June 1816 as Company D, 2d Battalion, Corps of Artillery, Northern Division

Reorganized and redesignated 1 June 1821 as Company B, 1st Regiment of Artillery

Reorganized and redesignated 13 February 1901 as the 2d Company, Coast Artillery, Artillery Corps

Redesignated 2 February 1907 as the 2d Company, Coast Artillery Corps

Reorganized and redesignated 18 July 1916 as the 1st Company, Fort Ruger Hawaii

Reorganized and redesignated 31 August 1917 as the 11th Company, Coast Defenses of Oahu

Redesignated in February 1921 as the 4th Company, Coast Defenses of Honolulu

Redesignated 30 June 1922 as the 2d Company, Coast Artillery Corps

Inactivated 1 July 1922 in Hawaii

Redesignated 1 July 1924 as Battery B, 1st Coast Artillery

Activated 1 June 1926 at Fort Randolph (Panama), Canal Zone

Inactivated 31 July 1926 at Fort Randolph, Canal Zone

Activated 15 April 1932 at Fort Randolph, Canal Zone

Inactivated 30 March 1941 at Fort Sherman, Canal Zone

Activated 17 April 1942 at Fort Sherman, Canal Zone

Reorganized and redesignated 1 November 1944 as Battery B, 1st Coast Artillery Battalion

Disbanded 1 February 1946 at Fort Sherman, Canal Zone

Reconstituted 21 June 1950 in the Regular Army as Battery B, 1st Coast Artillery; concurrently redesignated as Battery B, 1st Antiaircraft Battalion

Redesignated 17 March 1955 as Battery B, 1st Antiaircraft Artillery Missile Battalion

Activated 15 April 1955 at Irwin, Pennsylvania

Redesignated 26 October 1956 as Battery B, 74th Antiaircraft Artillery Missile Battalion

Inactivated 1 September 1958 at Pittsburgh, Pennsylvania; concurrently consolidated with Headquarters and Headquarters Battery, 2d Howitzer Battalion, 1st Artillery (active) (organized in 1901), and consolidated unit designated as Headquarters and Headquarters Battery, 2d Howitzer Battalion, 1st Artillery, an element of the 4th Infantry Division (organic elements constituted and activated 1 April 1957)

2d Howitzer Battalion, 1st Artillery, inactivated 1 October 1963 at Fort Lewis, Washington, and relieved from assignment to the 4th Infantry Division

Redesignated 14 July 1966 as the 2d Battalion, 1st Artillery

Activated 25 August 1966 at Fort Sill, Oklahoma

Redesignated (less former Headquarters and Headquarters Battery, 2d Howitzer Battalion, 1st Artillery) 1 September 1971 as the 2d Battalion, 1st Air Defense Artillery, and inactivated at Fort Sill, Oklahoma (former Headquarters and Headquarters Battery, 2d Howitzer Battalion, 1st Artillery, concurrently reorganized and redesignated as the 2d Battalion, 1st Field Artillery – hereafter separate lineage)

2d Battalion, 1st Air Defense Artillery, activated 13 September 1972 in McCully Barracks, Mainz-Wackerheim, Germany

Inactivated 30 June 1983 in Germany

Activated 16 June 1987 at Fort Bliss, Texas

Inactivated 15 September 1994 at Fort Bliss, Texas

Activated 4 May 1996 at Fort Lewis, Washington

Redesignated 1 October 2005 as the 2d Battalion, 1st Air Defense Artillery Regiment

== Campaign participation credit ==
* signifies that the unit has an Earned Credit for that campaign

War of 1812: *Canada

Indian Wars: *Seminoles; Texas 1859

Mexican War: *Palo Alto; *Resaca de la Palma; Monterey; *Vera Cruz; *Cerro Gordo; *Contreras; *Churubusco; *Chapultepec; *Tamaulipas 1846; *Vera Cruz 1847; *Mexico 1847

Civil War: Sumter; Bull Run; Mississippi River; Peninsula; Manassas; Antietam; Fredericksburg; Chancellorsville; Gettysburg; Wilderness; Spotsylvania; *Cold Harbor; *Petersburg; Shenandoah; *Appomattox; Florida 1861; Florida 1862; *Florida 1864; *South Carolina 1862; *South Carolina 1863; Virginia 1863; *Virginia 1864; West Virginia 1863; Louisiana 1864

World War II: *American Theater, Streamer without inscription; Tunisia; Sicily; Rome-Arno; Rhineland

Southwest Asia: *Defense of Saudi Arabia; *Liberation and Defense of Kuwait; *Cease-Fire

War on Terrorism: Campaigns to be determined

== Decorations ==
- Valorous Unit Award for SAUDI ARABIA AND BAHRAIN*
- Meritorious Unit Commendation (Army), Streamer embroidered SOUTHWEST ASIA 2002–2003*
- Army Superior Unit Award, Streamer embroidered 1996*
