= Camp Walker =

U.S. military base in Daegu, South Korea

Coordinates: 35°50′11″N 128°35′25″E

- Nam District, Daegu, South Korea
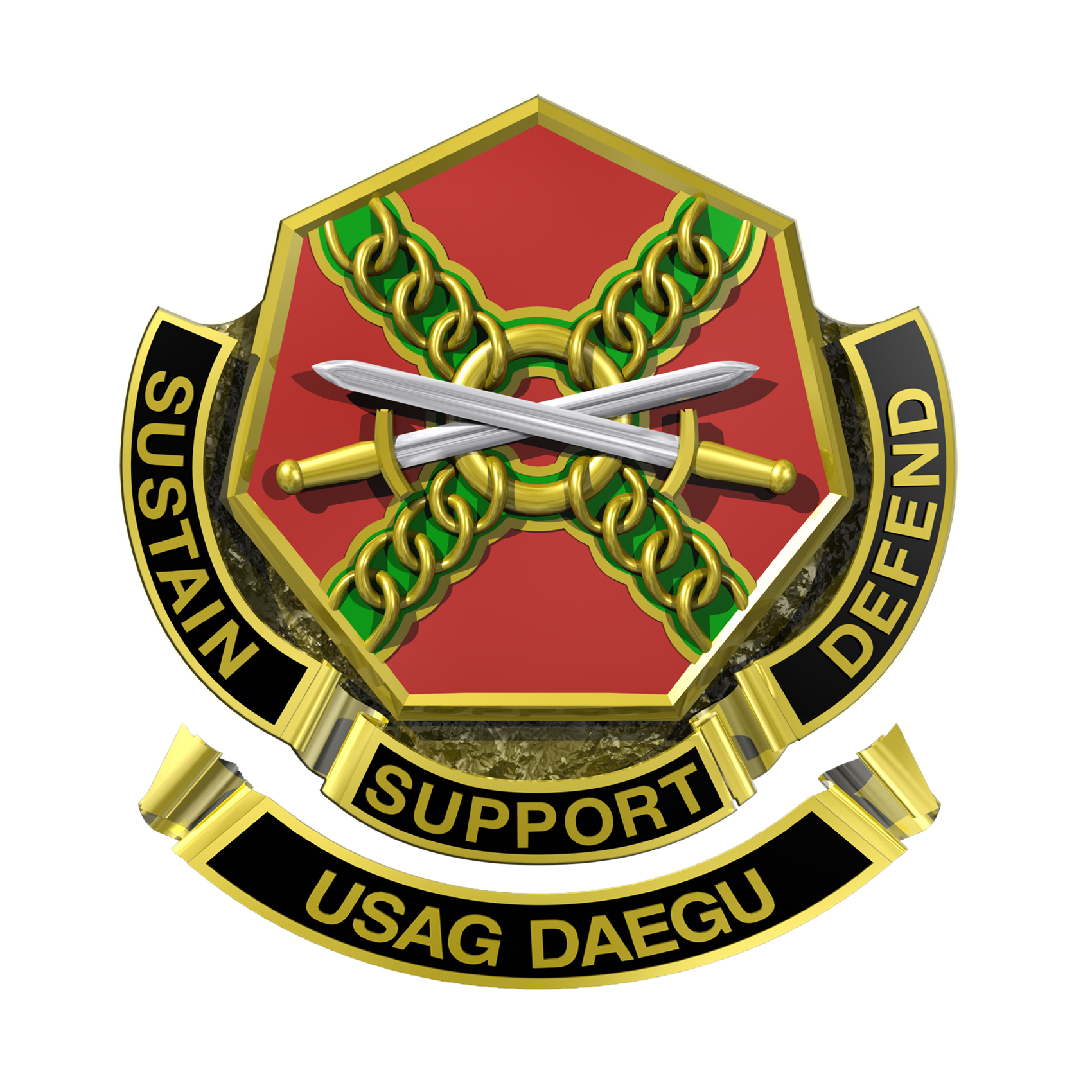
- Official crest of United States Army Garrison Daegu

Site information
- Type: Army post
- Owner: United States; South Korea
- Controlled by: United States Army

Site history
- Built: 1921
- In use: 1950 - present

Camp Walker (Korean: 캠프 워커) is a U.S. military base in Daegu, South Korea. Camp Walker was named in 1951 after General Walton Walker, commander of the Eighth Army who was killed in a jeep crash in December 1950 during the Korean War. Camp Walker, Camp Henry, and Camp George are the three U.S. military bases in Daegu, part of the U.S. Army Garrison Daegu. Camp Walker spans 94 acres (0.38 km^{2}) and contains military family housing for about 360 military and civilian families. Also on Camp Walker are Daegu Middle High School, a DoDEA school serving 6th to 12th graders; the main Exchange and DeCA Commissary; the Camp Walker Army Lodge; the Evergreen Golf Course; Kelly Gym and Athletic Field; and several Family and Morale, Welfare and Recreation (FMWR) clubs.

The nearest subway station is Hyeonchungno of Daegu Metro, located on the northwest side of the base outside Gate 6.

== History ==
The camp was originally established as an Imperial Japanese Army base in 1921 during the Japanese imperial period. An airfield was later built on the base.

=== Korean War ===
During the Korean War the USAF designated the airfield as K-37 or Taegu West Air Base. The runway was improved to an asphalt surfaced 4,335 feet (1,321 m) by 140 feet (43 m) facility.

Detachment F of the USAF 3rd Air Rescue Squadron operating Sikorsky H-5s and later Sikorsky H-19s was based at K-37 from January–June 1951. One H-5 remained at K-37 while the rest of the unit moved forward to K-16.

On 2 February 1951 H-5G #48-0530 was written off in a crash 8 miles (13 km) west of K-37.

== Occupants ==
- AAFES Regional Headquarters
- H-805 Airfield Operations
- 168th Medical Battalion
- 188th Military Police Company
- 169th Signal Company
- 19th ESC
- Major Cybercrime Unit - Korea Office (CID)

== Facilities ==
- Medical Facilities available:
  - Wood Medical Clinic
  - Bodine Dental Clinic
- F&MWR facilities
  - Evergreen Golf Course
  - Evergreen Community Club
  - Hilltop Club
  - Kelly Fitness Center
  - United Service Organizations
  - Apple Tree Goods
  - Bowling Center
  - KATUSA and KN Snack Bar
- AAFES facilities available:
  - Post Exchange
  - Four Seasons
  - Shoppette
  - LG Uplus (Mobile, Internet)
  - Burger King
  - Commissary
  - Post Office

== Education ==
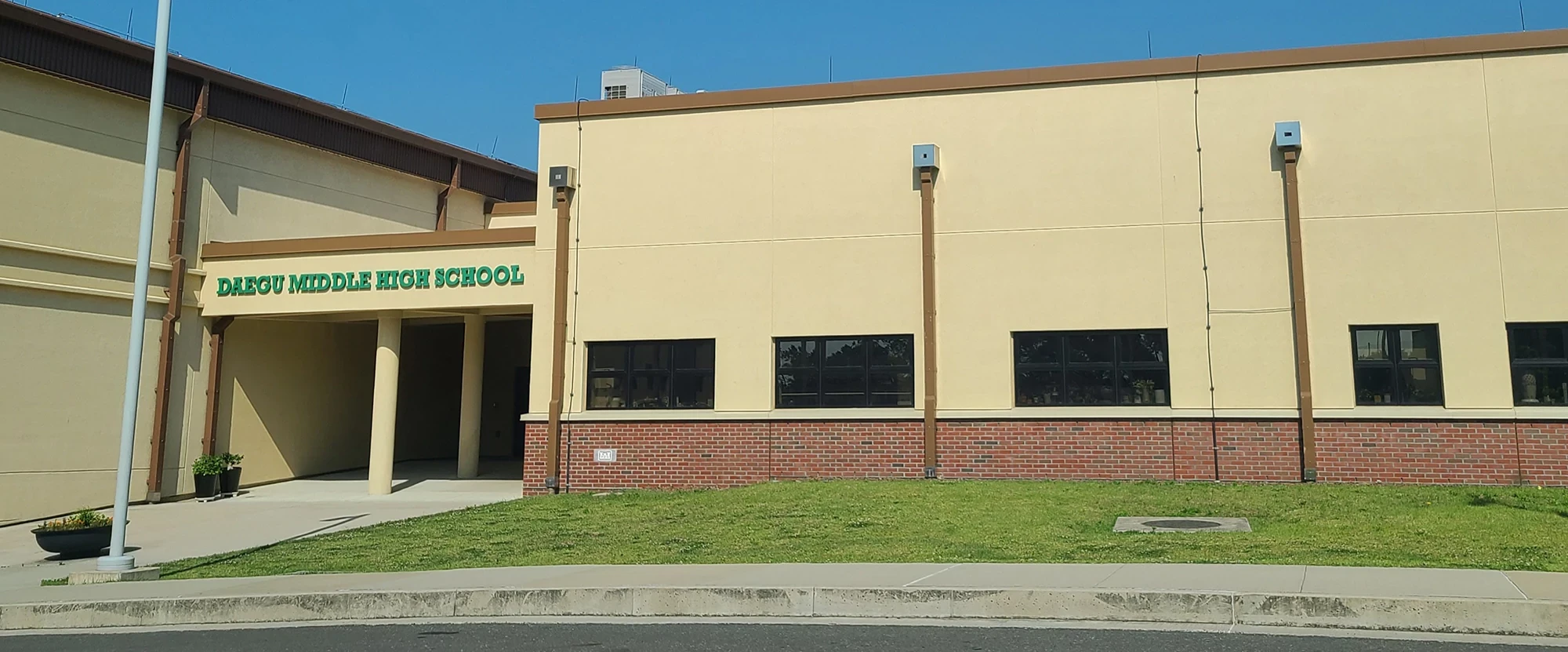
Daegu Middle High School

Department of Defense Education Activity (DoDEA) operates base schools. Daegu Middle High School is in Camp Walker. Daegu Elementary School is in Camp George.

== See also ==
- List of United States Army installations in South Korea
