= Camp Coiner =

Former United States Military base in South Korea

Coordinates: 37°32′39″N 126°58′38″E

Camp Coiner is a former 55-acre (220,000 m^{2}) United States Forces Korea installation located on the northern part of Yongsan Garrison located in Seoul, South Korea. It was named after 2nd Lieutenant Randall Coiner, assigned to the 3rd Battalion, 31st Infantry Regiment of the 7th Infantry Division, who was posthumously awarded the Silver Star for actions taken in 1953 during the Korean War near the village of Sokkagae.

Camp Coiner was located within the Yongsan-gu district of Seoul. East of the camp is the commercial district of Itaewon, with westernized shopping and nightlife. To the west of Yongsan is the Samgakji subway station and Yongsan Electronics Market.

Prior to the US military taking control of the camp from the Imperial Japanese Army, Camp Coiner was used as a garrison for horse-drawn artillery units.

Currently closed as a result of the US Forces Korea base consolidation, Camp Coiner was once home to:

- Headquarters and elements, 8th Personnel Command
- elements of 8th MP Brigade
- HHC, 1st Battalion, 501st Aviation
- HHC, 4th Battalion, 58th Aviation
- elements of 1st Signal Brigade
- Headquarters, Contracting Command - Korea
- Eighth Army Reception Center
- Morning Calm Dining Facility
- Headquarters, ROK Army Support Group
- Headquarters, 24th Korean Service Corps
- numerous unit Enlisted barracks, Bachelor Officer Quarters, and unit motor pools

== See also ==
- List of United States Army installations in South Korea
