= Joseph Fil =

United States Army general

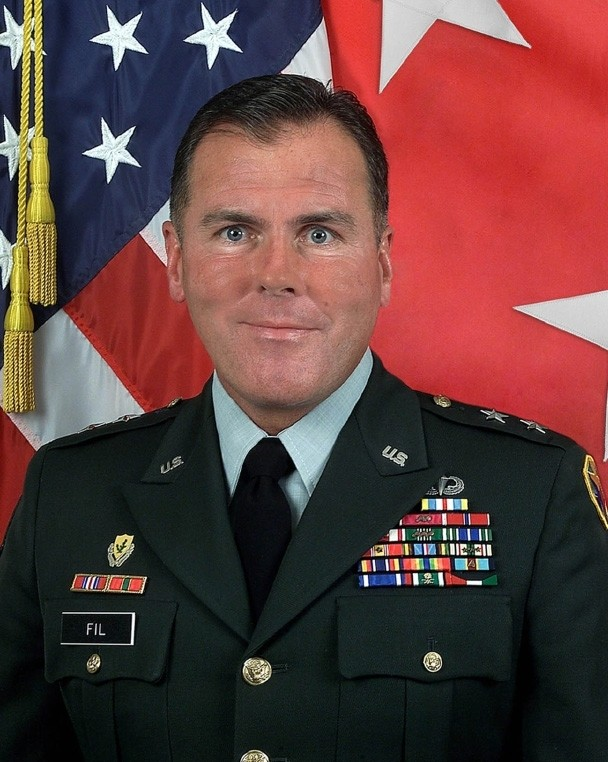
Maj. Gen. Joseph F. Fil Jr.

Major General Joseph Frederick Fil Jr. (born 22 May 1953) is a former military officer, who was demoted from Lieutenant general following a scandal.

== Education ==
His education includes a Bachelor of Science Degree in Anthropology from San Jose State University, a Masters of Science in Administration from Central Michigan University, a Masters of Military Arts and Science from the United States Army Command and General Staff College and a Masters of Science in National Security and Strategic Studies from the National War College at the National Defense University. He is a graduate from the Armor Officer Basic and Advanced Courses, the United States Army Command and General Staff College and the National War College. He has served in various command and staff positions at the battalion, brigade, division, combat training centers, Army Staff, NATO and Multi-National Security Transition Command.

== Military career ==
In 1977, his first assignment was with 2d Battalion 68th Armor Battalion, 8th Infantry Division, United States Army Europe and Seventh Army, Germany. There he served as a platoon leader in Charlie Company, the Executive Officer for Alpha Company, Battalion S-1 and Battalion S-4. Following his attendance at the Armor Officer Advanced Course, Fil was assigned to the 24th Infantry Division, Fort Stewart, Georgia in May 1981. There he served as Assistant Operations Officer, 1st Brigade, commander Alpha Company, 2d Battalion, 70th Armor and Operations Officer, 2d Battalion, 70th Armor.

In 1984, after serving at Fort Stewart, Fil served as Research and Development Officer, School of Acquisition Management, United States Army Logistics Management Center, Fort Lee, Virginia followed by services as an Armor Staff Officer, Armored Family of Vehicles Task Force, Office of the Deputy Chief of Staff for Operations and Plans, Washington, D.C., in 1986.

Upon completion of the Command and General Staff College in 1989, he served as the Operations Officer and later as Executive Officer 3d Battalion, 35th Armor, 1st Armored Division in Bamberg, Germany. In 1990, Fil served as logistics officer, 3d Brigade, 1st Armored Division during Operations Desert Shield/Storm and later as executive officer, 3d Brigade, 1st Armored Division in Bamberg, Germany. In 1992, Fil was reassigned to Fort Hood, Texas, where he commanded 1st Battalion, 12th Cavalry, 1st Cavalry Division.

After completing the National War College in Washington, D.C., Fil was assigned to Operations Group at the National Training Center in Fort Irwin, California. There he served as the Senior Armor Task Force Trainer, Senior Brigade Combat Team Trainer and then he served as the Deputy Commander/Chief of Staff for Fort Irwin. In 1997, Lieutenant General Fil returned to Fort Hood, Texas and commanded 1st Brigade, 1st Cavalry Division. In 1999, he returned to Germany and served as Commander, Operations Group for the United States Army Combat Maneuver Training Center at the Hohenfels Training Area in Hohenfels, Germany.

In 2000, he was reassigned to SHAPE, Belgium as Chief, Requirements and Programs Branch, Office of the Assistant Chief of Staff for Policy, Supreme Allied Powers Europe/Deputy Commanding General, United States Army, NATO, Belgium. Upon returning to the United States in 2002, Fil served as the Commanding General, National Training Center, Fort Irwin, California. From September 2004 to October 2005, Fil served as the Commanding General, Civilian Police Assistance Training Team, Multi-National Security Transition Command – Iraq, Operation Iraqi Freedom, Iraq. From November 2005 to February 2008, Fil served as the Commanding General, 1st Cavalry Division, Fort Hood, Texas. In November 2006, then Major General Fil deployed the division to Iraq and served as the Commanding General, Multi National Division - Baghdad in support of Operation Iraqi Freedom during the "surge." In February 2008, Fil relinquished command of 1st Cavalry Division, was promoted to Lieutenant General (LTG) and assumed command of Eighth United States Army and Chief of Staff/United Nations Command/Combined Forces Command/United States Forces Korea.

While still on active duty in the United States, Lieutenant-general Fil was investigated in 2011 by the US Army for improperly receiving gifts worth approximately $3,500 while serving in Korea.

Fil subsequently was demoted and retired as a Major General (MG), a decision Secretary of the Army John McHugh made “after weighing the substantiated allegations of misconduct . . . against an otherwise long and distinguished career.”

== Personal ==
He is the son of Joseph Frederick Fil Sr. (25 May 1928 – 16 September 2016) and Susan Rose (Gorman) Fil. The couple were married on 17 June 1952 in San Francisco and had four sons.

Fil Jr. was raised in Portola Valley, California, but was born in neighboring Santa Clara County.
