= Camp Henry =

U.S. military base in Daegu, South Korea

Coordinates: 35°51′09″N 128°36′06″E

- Nam District, Daegu, South Korea
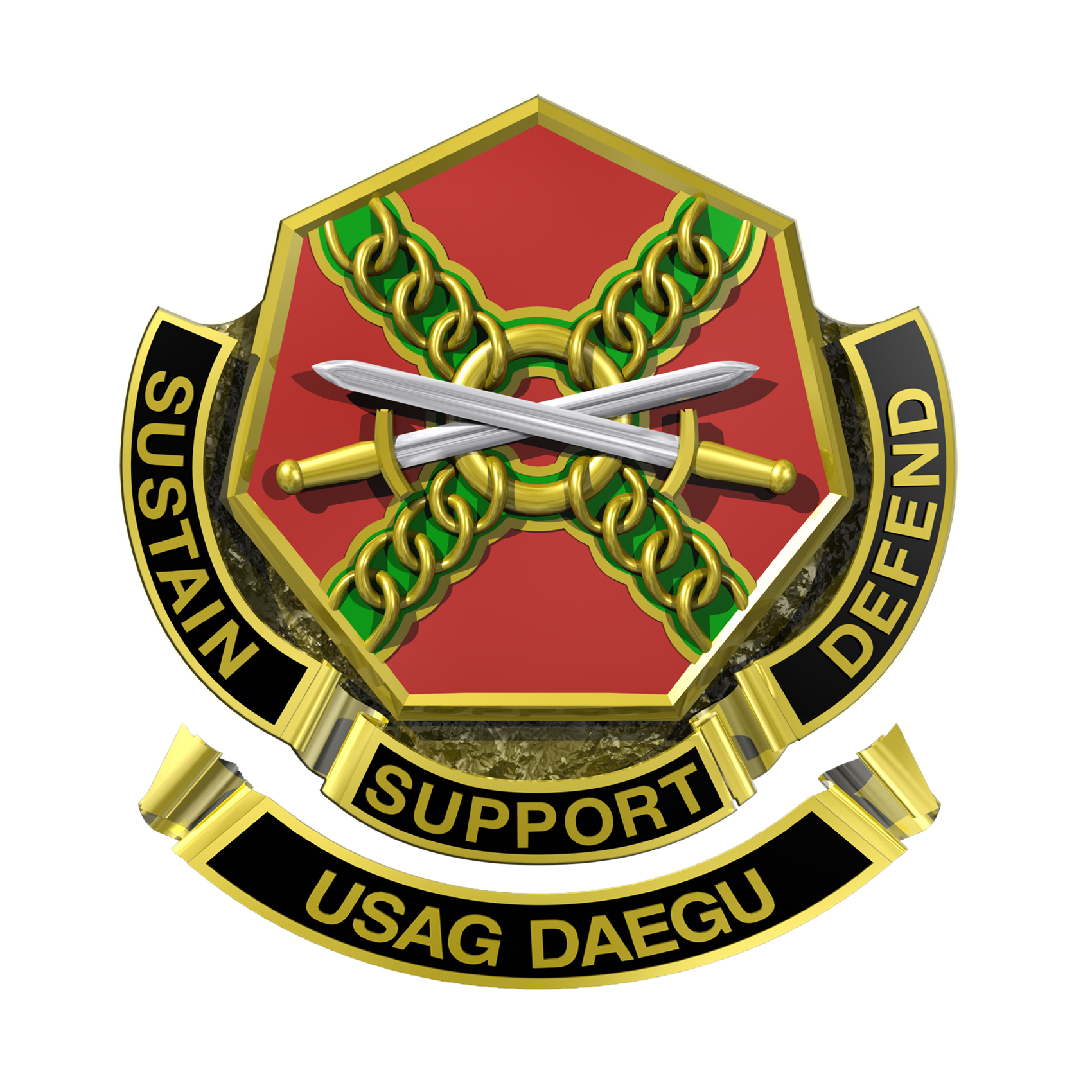
- Official crest of United States Army Garrison Daegu

Site information
- Type: Army post
- Owner: United States; South Korea
- Controlled by: United States Army

Site history
- Built: 1921
- In use: 1960–present

Camp Henry (Korean: 캠프 헨리) is a U.S. military base in Daegu, South Korea. Camp Henry was named in 1960 after First Lieutenant Frederick F. Henry, who served with F Company, 38th Infantry Regiment, 2nd Infantry Division. Camp Henry is located in the Nam-gu District of Daegu City on 16 acres (0.065 km^{2}). It consists primarily of administrative buildings and community support facilities. The U.S. Army Garrison – Daegu, headquartered at Camp Henry in Daegu, manages the installation and provides base operations services for the people who live and or work at Camp Carroll. Major tenant units on Camp Henry are the 19th Sustainment Command (Expeditionary) and the 403rd Army Field Support Brigade—Korea (Provisional).

== History ==
Built by the Imperial Japanese Army in 1921, what became known as Camp Henry served as the headquarters for Jirō Minami, Governor-General of Korea between 1936 and 1942, as well as Japanese forces stationed in the Daegu area. When Korea was liberated from Japan in 1945, the camp was taken over by the Republic of Korea Army. During the Korean War, the camp saw little action because of its location inside the northern edge of the Pusan Perimeter. After the Korean War, the camp was used by the United States. In May 1960, the camp was named after First Lieutenant Frederick Henry, a Korean War Medal of Honor recipient.

== Occupants ==
=== The 19th Expeditionary Sustainment Command ===
The 19th Sustainment Command (Expeditionary), formerly known as the 19th Theater Support Command, is the Army's first Sustainment Command (Expeditionary) to transform. It provides logistical support to the various Camp Henry Daegu, Republic of Korea "ARMY STRONG" subordinate units assigned to the 8th United States Army located throughout the Republic of Korea. Its Headquarters and Headquarters Company is located at Camp Walker.

=== The 403rd Army Field Support Brigade—Korea ===
The 403rd Army Field Support Brigade—Korea (Provisional) was initially established in April 1986 as the Logistics Assistance Office – Far East. The command was officially organized as Army Materiel Command – Far East in July 1987. Its mission is to provide oversight of AMC activities in the Pacific Theater and serve as the Army Material Command focal point for logistics and readiness issues in support of United States Army Pacific Command, United States Army Japan, and the Eighth United States Army.

- Headquarters, Headquarters Company, USAG-Daegu
- III Marine Expeditionary Force
- 25th Transportation Battalion
- Criminal Investigation Division
- 168th Multifunctional Medical Battalion
- 176th Finance Company
- Republic of Korea Army Support Group

== Facilities ==
- Army Community Service/Army Emergency Relief/Family Advocacy
- Criminal Investigation Division
- Fit to Win Center
- Headquarters, USAG-Daegu
- Henry's Place
- Visual Information Support Center
- Navy Federal Credit Union
- Training Aids, Device Simulators & Simulations
- Camp Henry Theater
- Headquarters, 19th Expeditionary Sustainment Command
- Fire Station
- Dining Facility
- Housing Office
- Victory Field

== Former Commanders ==
Since March 1985, the following officers have served as commander of Headquarters, 20th Area Support Group, which held both the base operations and combat service support missions in Area IV; Headquarters, Area IV Support Activity, which assumed the base operations mission from the 20th Area Support Group on 5 August 2004 and finally the Headquarters, U.S. Army Garrison – Daegu when the Area IV Support Activity was redesignated on 28 March 2007.

=== 20th Area Support Group ===
- COL Herbert N. Meininger March 1985 – July 1986
- COL Gary A. Frenn July 1986 – July 1988
- COL Michael R. Devine July 1988 – June 1990
- COL Francis N. Pitaro June 1990 – June 1992
- COL Richard B. Gilmore June 1992 – June 1994
- COL Larry D. Leighton June 1994 – March 1996
- COL Philip M. Jones March 1996 – July 1996
- COL Redding Hobby 22 July 1996 – 22 July 1998
- COL Clarence C. Newby 22 July 1998 – 12 July 2000
- COL Russell A. Bucy 12 July 2000 – 10 July 2002
- COL Ronald F. McDonald the 3rd 10 July 2002 – 8 July 2004

=== Area IV Support Activity ===
- COL James M. Joyner 16 October 2003 – 8 July 2004
- COL Donald J. Hendrix 5 August 2004 – 27 July 2006
- COL John E. Dumoulin Jr. 27 July 2006 – 28 March 2007

=== U.S. Army Garrison – Daegu ===
- COL John E. Dumoulin Jr. 28 March 2007 – 30 May 2007
- COL Michael P Saulnier 30 May 2007 – 26 June 2009
- COL Terry D. Hodges 26 June 2009 – September 2010
- COL Kathleen A. Gavel 10 November 2010 – 19 June 2013
- COL Jim M. Bradford 19 June 2013 – 19 June 2015
- COL Ted Stephens 19 June 2015 – 28 June 2017
- COL Robert P. Mann Jr. 28 June 2017–present

== See also ==
- List of United States Army installations in South Korea
