= American Forces Network =

Broadcast service operated by the United States Armed Forces

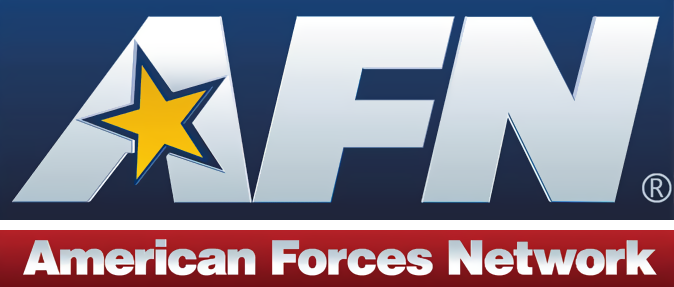
- Formerly: Armed Forces Radio Service (1942–1954); Armed Forces Radio & Television Service (1954–2009)
- Founded: 26 May 1942; 84 years ago
- Founder: United States Department of Defense
- Headquarters: Fort Meade, Maryland (Main headquarters); Sembach Kaserne, Germany (AFN Europe); Yokota Air Base, Japan (AFN Pacific); March ARB, California (AFN Broadcast Center)
- Number of locations: 28 manned locations worldwide
- Key people: Chris Vadnais (Director); Lt Col Matt Chism, USAF (Commander, AFN Europe); Lt Col Cody Chiles, USAF (Commander, AFN Pacific); Kim Antos (Acting Director, AFN Broadcast Center)
- Products: Radio, Television
- Owner: Defense Media Activity
- Parent: Office of the Assistant Secretary of Defense for Public Affairs
- Website: afn.mil

The American Forces Network (AFN) is a government television and radio broadcast service the United States Armed Forces provides to soldiers stationed or assigned overseas, and is headquartered at Fort Meade in Maryland. AFN comprises two subordinate overseas commands and one directorate in the continental United States. Overseas, AFN Europe is headquartered at Sembach Kaserne in Germany and consists of 15 subordinate stations in the countries of Bahrain, Belgium, Cuba, Germany, Greece, Italy, Spain, and Turkey. AFN Pacific is headquartered at Yokota Air Base in Japan and consists of nine stations in Diego Garcia, Japan, and South Korea. Stations under AFN Europe and AFN Pacific broadcast live local radio shows Monday through Friday, with the exception of U.S. federal holidays. Stateside, AFN's broadcast operations, which include global radio and television satellite feeds, emanate from the AFN Broadcast Center at March Air Reserve Base in Riverside, California.

== History ==
What is today the Maryland-based headquarters of the American Forces Network began on 26 May 1942 when the War Department established the Armed Forces Radio Service (AFRS) in Los Angeles, California, with U.S. Army Colonel Tom Lewis in command. The original American Forces Network began on 4 July 1943 when AFRS established what is today AFN Europe in London, England with U.S. Army Lieutenant Colonel Charles Gurney in command. A television service was first introduced in 1954 with a pilot station at Limestone Air Force Base, Maine. In 1954, the television mission of AFRS was officially recognized and AFRS (Armed Forces Radio Service) became AFRTS (Armed Forces Radio and Television Service).

All the Armed Forces broadcasting affiliates worldwide merged under the AFN banner on 1 January 1998. On 21 November 2000, the American Forces Information Service directed a change of the AFRTS organizational title from Armed Forces Radio and Television Service to American Forces Radio and Television Service. A timeline of the history of AFN is available online.

=== Origins ===
The first station to be under the control of the U.S. Armed Forces was KGEI in San Francisco, whose origins come from a GE exhibit, which in February 1939 started shortwave broadcasts aimed at the Philippines, which at the time were under American control. The station was used as a counterpoint to Radio Tokyo and ultimately became a model for the army network following the invasion of Pearl Harbor in late 1941.

The first radio station began in Delta Junction, Alaska, on what was then known as Fort Greely. It was called KODK and was operated by on base personnel. In the years just before World War II, there were several radio stations based in American military bases, but none were officially recognized until 1942. The success of these individual radio stations helped pave the way for the AFN. As such, there was no single station that could be called the "first" to sign on as an AFN station. About two months before the formal establishment of AFN, however, a station called "PCAN" began regular broadcast information service in the Panama Canal Zone, primarily for troops on jungle bivouac. The station, located at Fort Clayton, was later to become part of AFRS, first simply as "Armed Forces Network" located at Albrook Field.

=== World War II ===
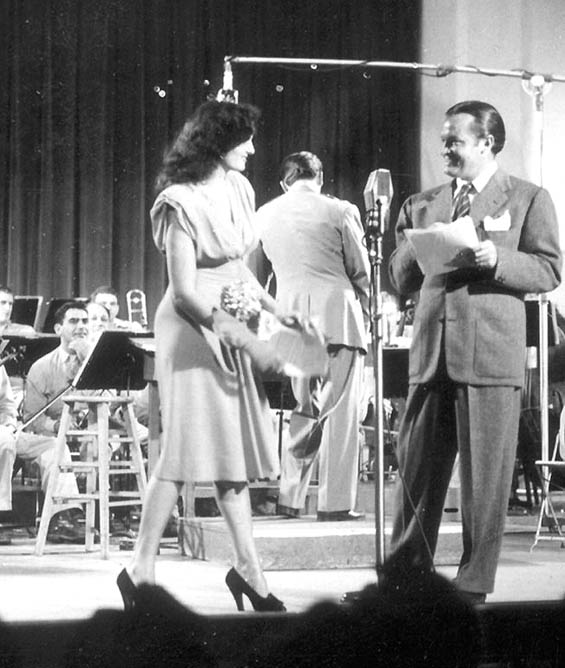
Bob Hope welcomes Jane Russell to Command Performance (1944).

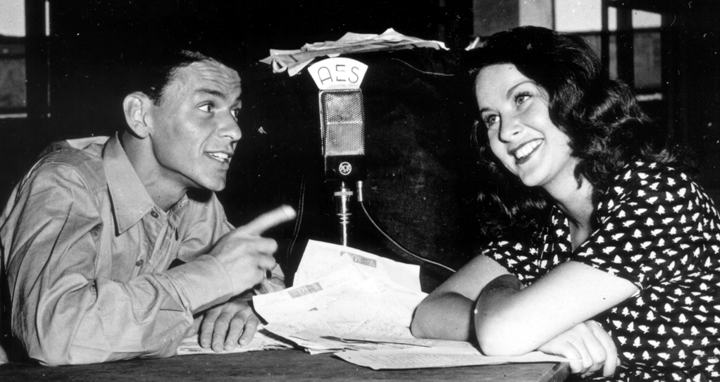
Frank Sinatra interviews actress Alida Valli for one of the many programs produced by the Armed Forces Radio Service for broadcast to the troops overseas during World War II.

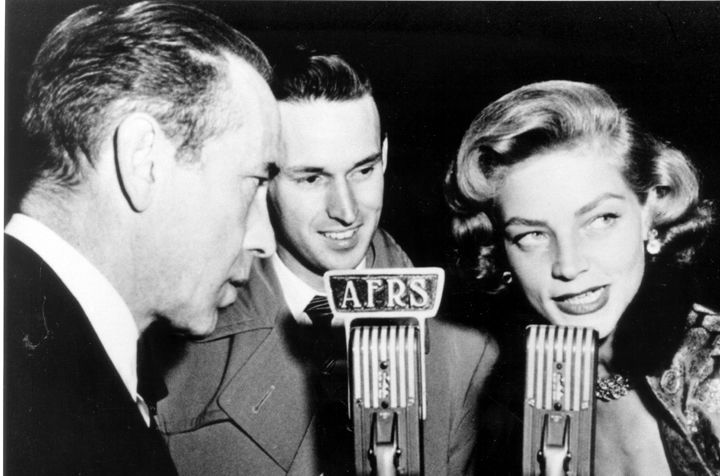
Humphrey Bogart and Lauren Bacall being interviewed by the Armed Forces Radio Service

The original AFN - present day AFN Europe - began broadcasting from London during World War II, using equipment and studio facilities borrowed from the British Broadcasting Corporation (BBC).

The first transmission to U.S. troops began at 5:45 p.m. 4 July 1943, and included less than five hours of recorded shows, including a BBC News and sports broadcast. That day, T5 Syl Binkin became the first U.S. military broadcaster heard over the air. The signal was sent from London via telephone lines to five regional transmitters to reach U.S. troops in the United Kingdom as they made preparations for the invasion of Nazi-occupied Europe.

Fearing competition for civilian audiences, the BBC initially tried to impose restrictions on AFN broadcasts within Britain (transmissions were allowed only from American bases outside London and were limited to 50 watts of transmission power) and a minimum quota of British produced programming had to be carried. Nevertheless, AFN programs were widely enjoyed by the British civilian listeners who could receive them, and once AFN operations transferred to continental Europe (shortly after D-Day) AFN was able to broadcast with little restriction with programs available to civilian audiences across most of Europe, (including Britain), after dark.

As D-Day approached, the network joined with the BBC and the Canadian Broadcasting Corporation to develop programs especially for the Allied Expeditionary Forces. Mobile stations, complete with personnel, broadcasting equipment and a record library, were deployed to broadcast music and news to troops in the field. The mobile stations reported on front-line activities and fed the news reports back to studio locations in London.

Although the network's administrative headquarters remained in London, its operational headquarters soon moved to Paris.

As Allied forces continued to push German troops back into their homeland, AFN moved east as well. The liberation of most of Western Europe saw AFN stations serving the forces liberating Biarritz, Cannes, Le Havre, Marseille, Nice, Paris and Reims.

During the period between 1943 and 1949 the AFN also broadcast programs developed through a collaboration of the Department of State's Office of the Coordinator of Inter-American Affairs and CBS's La Cadena de las Americas network while supporting America's cultural diplomacy initiatives. Included among the programs was Viva America which showcased leading musical talents from both North and South America and was transmitted for the benefit of armed forces throughout Europe and to South America over CBS's short wave network "La Cadena de Las Americas".

=== Post-war contraction and expansion ===
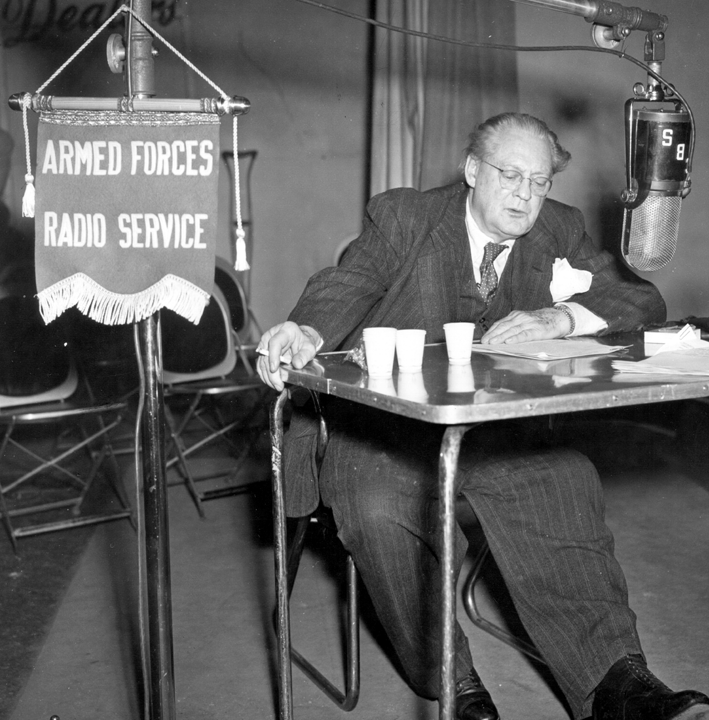
Lionel Barrymore broadcasting the Armed Forces Radio Service's Concert Hall radio show (1947)

On 10 July 1945, the first AFN station in occupied Germany started broadcasting: AFN Munich. Its first broadcast was however incorrect as it began with the sentence "Good morning! This is AFN Munich, the voice of the 7th Army!". General George S. Patton, commander of the 3rd Army, was furious with the opening as his army had taken control over Munich the previous night, and demanded that the responsible person be court-martialed.

Soon after AFN Munich signed on the air in the southern part of occupied Germany, in northern Germany, AFN Bremen begin broadcasting a few weeks later with its first radio broadcast occurring on Saturday, 28 July 1945. (In 1949, the station moved from the city of Bremen north to the port city of Bremerhaven and became AFN Bremerhaven.)

On 31 December 1945, AFN London signed off the air, and in 1948 AFN closed all its stations in France. This started the cycle of AFN stations where they would be built up during wartime, then torn down or moved after the war was over. Of the 300 stations in operation worldwide in 1945, only 60 remained in 1949.

=== Post-War Europe ===
A large number of AFN stations continued broadcasting from American bases in Europe (particularly Germany) after World War II. (Eight remain on the air today. See article on German Wikipedia.)

During the Berlin Blockade of 1948–1949, planes headed for Tempelhof in West Berlin tuned their radios to AFN-Berlin because the station's transmission tower was in the glide path to the airfield and was not jammed by the Soviets.

During the 1950s and 1960s, AFN had large civilian audiences in Europe, as European radio stations rarely played American music. In Communist countries, all radio stations were state-operated, and never played American music. Despite the language barrier, the people in those countries saw AFN as an alternative connection to the West. Also, unlike stations such as Radio Free Europe, which broadcast in Eastern European languages, AFN was not jammed by the Soviets.

Especially popular was Music in the Air, which aired on the full European network at 19:00 CET. The host was AFN Frankfurt (civilian) manager John Vrotsos, who had an especially warm baritone voice. He began each program by saying (after an introductory piano phrase from the program's theme music) "Listen ... [pause for more piano] ... there's music in the air". The theme was "Music Everywhere" in an arrangement by Victor Young. Later in the 1950s, Leroy Anderson's Belle of the ball was used. The program was popular throughout Northern Europe, especially in the liberated countries such as the Netherlands, Belgium, France (the northern part), Luxembourg and, to a lesser extent, Denmark. Many Dutch households switched to the program, also because of their positive experiences with the American liberators. Also featured were live performances of classical music and jazz by Samuel Hans Adler's Seventh Army Symphony Orchestra in support of America's cultural diplomacy initiatives in the post war period.

In France, about a dozen AFN stations operated, with AFN Orléans as the studio control station. The network broadcast music, shows, and news relayed from AFN Frankfurt, locally produced shows, and other features aimed at the American soldiers and their families stationed in France. In particular, a whole team of reporters and technicians was sent to cover the 24-hour auto race at Le Mans, at a time when Ford was doing its best to beat the Ferraris, and finally succeeded. AFN France broadcast with 50 watt FM transmitters made by French manufacturer TRT, type OZ 305. The network employed a technical director, a program director, several military American broadcast professionals, and some French studio operators, record librarians, secretaries and maintenance technicians. The Frankfurt network programming was received, then re-fed from AFN Orléans studios to another studio-equipped affiliate, AFN Poitiers and its repeater transmitters via modulation lines rented from the French postal service. AFN Poitiers, based at Aboville Caserne, Poitiers, France, home of an Army logistical command and a major Communication Zone Signal Corps agency, served Army depots and installations in Southwestern France with locally originated programs and network feeds from AFN Orléans via Frankfurt, Germany. It was the only other studio station affiliate of AFN Orléans because of the large American military presence and its resident Department of Defense dorm school for children of American military and civilian families assigned to Poitiers, and the American installations located throughout Southwestern France. Children living in outlying American military installations and communities commuted to Poitiers once a week for daily classes and departed for home by bus and train. AFN France was dismantled in 1967, when U.S. forces left France due to the French government's decision of President (General) Charles de Gaulle to withdraw its forces from NATO's military command. The French employees were dismissed but were granted a severance pay (in French francs and taxable) of one month per year of service, paid by the U.S. Army to the French government, in dollars (all the French employees were managed by a specially created service: le Bureau d'Aide aux Armées Alliées or AAA).

=== Korean War ===
When war broke out in Korea, Army broadcasters set up in Seoul in the Banto Hotel (the old American Embassy Hotel). When the Chinese entered Seoul in December 1950, the crew moved to a mobile unit that was just completed and retreated to Daegu. Due to the large number of American troops in Korea, a number of stations were started. Mobile units followed combat units to provide news and entertainment on the radio. By the time the 1953 armistice was signed, these mobile units became buildings with transmitters, and a network, American Forces Korea Network, was born.

Canadian and American television personality Jim Perry began his broadcasting career fresh out of high school with the Armed Forces Korea Network, under his birthname of Jim Dooley, spending one year in Korea before attending the University of Pennsylvania to further his education.

=== Pahlavi Iran ===
An AFRTS radio station became operational in Tehran, Iran, in 1959. This was followed by a television station in 1960, known as AFTV. It broadcast a radio service on 1555 kHz and a television service on Channel 7 in Tehran and the surrounding area from its studios in the city.

Its listeners (and viewers) were American military personnel stationed in Iran as part of ARMISH (the U.S. Army mission) and Military Assistance Advisory Group (MAAG) programs. AFTV was also popular with Iranian viewers, particularly children.

As the TV service only had a power of 1000 watts, it was only on air for a few hours each day, whereas the radio service operated for around 18 hours a day. In deference to Iranian sensitivities, AFRTS avoided carrying programming that might be construed as offensive on political or religious grounds, instead carrying cowboy or detective movies.

Following the nationalization of the privately owned Television Iran network in 1969, AFTV was the only television service not in the Iranian government's hands. However, in 1976, it was decided by the Iranian government that AFRTS should close down its radio and TV services, which it did on 25 October of that year, the day before the Shah's 57th birthday.

Radio 1555 closed with presenter Air Force Staff Sergeant Barry Cantor playing Roger Whittaker's "Durham Town (The Leavin')". This was followed by a closing announcement by Chief Master Sergeant and Station Manager Bob Woodruff, ending with the U.S. national anthem:

Ladies and Gentlemen, I'm Chief Master Sergeant Bob Woodruff Station Manager of the American Forces Radio and Television Service in Tehran. After 22 years of radio broadcasting and 17 years of telecasting in Tehran, AFRTS Radio 1555 and TV Channel 7 cease all operations in this country at this time. I bid you all goodbye and thank you for letting us serve you. And now the national anthem of the United States of America."

The following day, AFRTS radio and television services in Iran were replaced by those operated by the state broadcaster National Iranian Radio and Television (NIRT), which were similar in content, appealing to the 60 000 U.S. Army and civilian personnel then stationed in Iran, as well as the wider population of foreign nationals resident in the country.

=== South Vietnam ===
As the U.S. military presence in South Vietnam increased, AFRTS opened radio and later television stations there.

AFRTS stations in Vietnam were initially known by the name "AFRS" (Armed Forces Radio Saigon), but as the number of stations quickly expanded throughout South Vietnam became known as "AFVN" (American Forces Vietnam Network) and had several stations, including Qui Nhơn, Nha Trang, Pleiku, Da Nang and Huế, the latter being overrun by the People's Army of Vietnam during the Battle of Hue in January/February 1968 and replaced by a station in Quảng Trị. AFVN's headquarters station was located in Saigon.

In Vietnam, AFVN had a number of war-related casualties. After a fierce fire fight that killed two soldiers and a civilian contractor, the remaining AFVN station staff at Huế was captured and spent five years as prisoners of war. At the height of American involvement in the war, Armed Forces Vietnam Network served more than 500,000 fighting men and women at one time. AFVN developed a program along the lines of "GI Jive" from World War II. A number of local disc jockeys helped make hourlong music programs for broadcast. Perhaps the best-known program became the morning "Dawn Buster" program, (the brainchild of Chief Petty Officer Bryant Arbuckle in 1962) thanks to the popularity of the sign-on slogan "Gooooood Morning, Vietnam" (which was initiated by Adrian Cronauer and later became the basis for the film Good Morning, Vietnam starring Robin Williams). Among the notable people who were AFVN disc jockeys were Don L. "Scotty" Brink, Lee Hansen, Les Coleman and Pat Sajak, Chris Noel, John Allgood, Joe Huser, and Dennis Woytek. Army Spec. 5 Robert Morecook announced the upcoming end of the Vietnam War on AFVN-TV news in February, 1973, which followed 30 days later. Army Spec 4 Tom Fowlston was first to announce the war end on radio news. Harry Simons hosted the GO Show at both AFVN Saigon and Danang in 1968 and 1969. Simons along with broadcaster Mike Bates created and produced a 10-hour radio documentary (AFVN: The GI's Companion) as a tribute to AFVN and to honor all Vietnam Veterans. It aired and streamed on Veterans Day 2015 on WEBY Radio in Pensacola, Florida. The documentary is archived at Rock Radio Scrapbook: AFVN: The GI's Companion.

Beginning in 1971, AFVN began to close some stations in Vietnam. The last station to close was the key station in Saigon in 1973. Broadcasting continued under civilian leadership on FM only and using the name American Radio Service (ARS). The civilian engineers were provided by Pacific Architects and Engineers (PAE). ARS stayed on the air until the fall of Saigon in April 1975. It was to play Bing Crosby's version of Irving Berlin's "White Christmas" as a signal for Americans that the final evacuation of Saigon had begun. The Crosby version of the record could not be found so Tennessee Ernie Ford's record from 1968 was played.

=== Thailand ===
In Thailand, the Department of Defense began the planning for the Armed Forces Thailand Network in 1964 with Project Lamplighter and Project Limelight. By late 1966, implementation of the network began by the U.S. Air Force with stations on the air at Korat, U-Tapao, Ubon, Udorn, Takhli and Nahkon Phanom. In addition, there were more than 20 satellite stations that rebroadcast one or more of the primary stations, and that included one or more clandestine locations in Laos.

In April 1970, a battle-damaged RF-4C Phantom II #65-0863 returning to Udorn from a reconnaissance mission in northwest Laos, crashed into the AFTN station, killing 9 Air Force broadcasters. Pilot Leaphart and Navigator Bernholz ejected from their battle damaged plane when it went out of control on final approach. Both crewmen were injured but survived. The incident was the single worst catastrophe in the history of military broadcasting killing: TSGT Jack A Hawley, Wakeman, OH; SSGT James A. Howard, Denver, CO; A1C Andrew C. McCartney, Lakewood, OH; SSGT Alfred N. Potter, Forest Grove, OR; SGT John Charles Rose, Bloomfield, NJ; TSGT Frank D. Ryan Jr., Mercer Island, WA; SSGT Edward W. Strain, Myrtle Beach, SC; TSGT Roy Walker, Albuquerque, NM and A1C Thomas L. Waterman, Roanoke, VA.

AFTN became the American Forces Thailand Network in the summer of 1969, and continued operations until the spring of 1976 when the remaining U.S. troops in Thailand were withdrawn at the request of the Thai government. More than 600 broadcasters from the Air Force, Navy and Army had served during the ten years that AFTN operated.

=== Taiwan ===
Before the United States and the People's Republic of China established diplomatic relations in 1979, the AFN branch in Taiwan was Armed Forces Network Taiwan (AFNT), which had a main station in Yangmingshan American Military Housing, Taipei. After the U.S. armed forces withdrew all its troops stationed in Taiwan (including the United States Taiwan Defense Command) as Washington, D.C., recognizes Beijing and broke ties with Taipei, the station was reorganized under the name of International Community Radio Taipei (ICRT) by the American Chamber of Commerce in Taipei and the ROC government. Today, ICRT is the only English-language radio service in Taiwan.

=== Caribbean ===
Then still known as the American Forces (or Armed Forces) Radio and Television Service, military bases and facilities throughout Puerto Rico received original radio programming from Army studios at Ft. Brooke in San Juan, Air Force studios at Ramey Air Force Base, and radio and television originating from Navy studios at Roosevelt Roads, in addition to local playback of stateside entertainment radio and television shows. This broadcast service was known as AFCN, the American Forces Caribbean Network in the 1970s (later as the Armed Forces Caribbean Network) served military bases and facilities throughout Puerto Rico from transmitters in San Juan (Fort Brooke, Fort Buchanan), Roosevelt Roads Naval Station, and Ramey Air Force Base. Each of these bases also had their own television transmitters or cable systems that played back stateside TV programming delivered to each location in weekly "packages" of 16mm film, kinescope recordings, video tape, and satellite news programming feeds. AFCN Roosevelt Roads also produced live radio programming featuring Navy Journalist/Broadcaster disc jockeys in a Top 40 hits format, combined with programming from AFRTS Hollywood-sourced stateside shows such as American Top 40. Programming broadcast over AFCN broadcast radio and television transmitter antennas also reached some local civilian markets across Puerto Rico, such as San Juan.

=== Central America ===
Radio, and later television, to U.S. troops stationed in the Panama Canal Zone was provided initially by Armed Forces Radio (AFN) at Albrook Field and later as the Caribbean Forces Network at Fort Clayton with translators on the Atlantic side of the Canal Zone. In the early 1960s with reorganization of the command located in the Canal Zone, CFN became the Southern Command Network (SCN). SCN also broadcast to U.S. troops stationed in Honduras starting in 1987. SCN discontinued broadcasting on 1 July 1999 just before the 31 December turnover of the Canal Zone to the Republic of Panama when U.S. troops were removed from that country under the Torrijos-Carter Treaties.

AFN Honduras, which began in 1987 as SCN Honduras, now broadcasts from Soto Cano Air Base on 106.3 FM, and serves more than 600 American service members stationed at the installation, as well as numerous civilian employees and contractors. The station's primary mission is radio, originating programming including two daily live shows following the "Eagle" format. Personnel also occasionally produce video news packages. As of 15 January 2013, AFN Honduras is one of 18 stations under the operational control of AFN Europe.

=== Shortwave radio ===
With the advent of satellite broadcasting, AFRTS has shifted its emphasis away from shortwave. Currently, the U.S. Navy provides the only shortwave single sideband shortwave AFN radio broadcasts via relay sites around the world to provide service to ships, including Diego Garcia, Guam, Naval Air Station Sigonella in Italy, Puerto Rico, Hawaii and others.

== Organization ==
The American Forces Network (AFN) is the operational arm of the American Forces Radio and Television Service (AFRTS), an office of the Defense Media Activity (DMA). AFN falls under the operational control of the Office of the Assistant Secretary of Defense for Public Affairs (OASD-PA). AFN employs military broadcasters as well as Defense Department civilians and contractors.

AFN management is located at DMA headquarters at Fort Meade. Day-to-day AFN broadcast operations are conducted at the AFN stations and AFN regional directorate headquarters overseas, as well as at the AFN Broadcast Center in Riverside, California, from where all AFN radio and television satellite feeds emanate.

== Television services ==
=== European operations ===
Until the early 1970s, U.S. military television service was provided in Western Europe by Air Force Television at Ramstein Air Base, Germany. In the early 1970s, AFN assumed this responsibility for the Armed Forces Radio and Television Service (AFRTS).

AFN Bremerhaven was the first AFN television station in Europe to broadcast its programming in color. The U.S. European Edition of Stars and Stripes (S&S) reported in its Thursday, 21 August 1975, edition that the AFN-Europe Commander, Lt. Col. Floyd A. McBride, announced that AFN's first color TV broadcast would begin in Bremerhaven on Monday 25 August 1975. As S&S reported, because Bremerhaven's TV operation was so small, only a "Class C" operation, and, at the time, served only one area with TV programming, it was easy to establish the color TV broadcast operation without extensive expense or expansion.

That next year, S&S reported in its Wednesday, 23 June 1976, edition, that "the long-awaited switch to color by AFN-TV could come by the end of the year for viewers in most of West Germany. The only viewers enjoying color right now are those watching the pilot color TV station in Bremerhaven, which went on the air in…1975".

Finally, on 28 October 1976, AFN television moved from AFTV's old black-and-white studios at Ramstein to the network's new color television studios in Frankfurt. In the 1980s the network added affiliates with studio capabilities in Würzburg, Germany, and Soesterberg, Netherlands, expanding the network to 12 affiliate stations serving American military, DOD-employed civilians and their families estimated to be well-above 350,000 stationed in West Germany, the Netherlands, and Belgium. This was accomplished by a system of 112 microwave transmitters operated and maintained by the Army's 5th Signal Command. Embassies and other entities of the American government without access to AFN TV signals received a 30-plus hour package mailed weekly of AFN and U.S. programming. In April 1984, AFN began broadcasting live news, information and entertainment programming received through an 11-meter satellite dish downlink at AFN network headquarters, in addition to primetime pre-recorded shows and movies received from the Armed Forces Radio-Television Service broadcast center in Hollywood. For outlying areas, broadcast feeds of live American sports events were frequently provided by European contractors.

AFN TV was available in West Berlin until 1994. However, it was only available in the American Sector.

In 1946, AFN Europe headquarters relocated from London to Hoechst Castle on the western edge of Frankfurt.

In 1966, AFN Europe headquarters relocated to the Dornbusch quarter of Frankfurt, adjacent to Hessischer Rundfunk.

In 2004, AFN Europe headquarters relocated to Coleman Barracks in Mannheim, Germany.

In 2014, AFN Europe headquarters relocated to Sembach Kaserne in Sembach, Germany.

=== Pacific operations ===
Over-the-air TV for U.S. Forces in the Pacific were at one time provided by AFN-Korea, AFN-Japan and AFN-Kwajalein. All local operations merged under the AFN banner effective 1 January 1998.

==== South Korea ====
AFN-Korea, formerly American Forces Korea Network (AFKN), was the largest of AFN's Pacific TV operations, although there are also AM and FM operations from military bases around Korea. AFKN began TV operations on 15 September 1957 and consisted of an originating studio at Yongsan Garrison, Seoul, and six relay transmitters throughout the peninsula. AFKN's first live television newscast aired on 4 January 1959. On April 2, 2001, AFKN was renamed AFN Korea.

Until December 2007, the channel was widely available to non-military audiences on cable television, but following complaints from U.S. companies trying to sell programs in South Korea, USFK requested that the Korean Broadcasting Commission direct the removal of Pacific Prime from the Korean cable lineups. American Forces Network-Korea discontinued analog over-the-air TV broadcast 1 May 2012, due to request to do so from the South Korean government because many local residents could receive current over-the-air U.S. network programming, resulting in decreased sales of U.S. programs to South Korean stations.

==== Japan ====
AFN Japan, formerly the Far East Network (FEN), had one full-power VHF terrestrial TV outlet – located on Okinawa atop the Rycom Plaza Housing area in the central part of the island, AFN-Okinawa's (U.S. channel 8) TV signal served Marines, Airmen, Sailors, Soldiers, and their families stationed on-island. TV viewers on military bases in the Tokyo and Kanto Plain area of Japan can view AFN via contractor-operated base cable TV services, or through AFN Direct-To-Home (DTH) dish services if they reside off-base.

AFN-Japan's radio services consist of AM and FM stereo operations at Yokota Air Base (810 AM & cable FM), MCAS Iwakuni (1575 AM), FLTACTS Sasebo (1575 AM), Okinawa (648 AM & 89.1 FM) and Misawa Air Base (1575 AM).

AFN-Okinawa ceased over-the-air analog TV operations along with all other Japanese TV stations on July 24, 2011.

==== Latin America ====
There used to be a television service in Panama (SCN) from 1956 to 1999. Broadcast on channel 8 in the Pacific zone and channel 10 in the Atlantic zone. In 1999, from the termination of local production (June 30) to the shutdown of the station and return of the control of the Panama Canal to the Panamanian state (December 31), the channel was relaying the main AFN service. After its closure, the Panamanian regulatory body aimed at bidding channel 8 and its relay station to local companies, but the bid was frozen in March 2000.

In 2001, following failed attempts at creating a regional educational station, the Panamanian government started setting a date for the fate of the former SCN frequencies, July 10. Since no company successfully bid for those licenses, channels 7 and 9 in the capital zone were given for a bid, Tele 7 (now Oye TV) and TVMax, both starting in 2005.

==== Kwajalein Atoll ====
AFN-Kwajalein at the Reagan Missile Test Range on Kwajalein Atoll is the only civilian-run affiliate in AFN, broadcasting on U.S. channel 13 for military personnel and civilian contractor employees and their families. AFN-Kwajalein's signal is beamed by microwave to the nearby island of Roi-Namur and rebroadcast on channel 8.

With the availability of AFN's DTH service, terrestrial over-the-air TV broadcasts at all AFN outlets are slated for deactivation in the near future.

=== Gulf War ===
In January 1991, the network dispatched news teams and technicians to Kuwait and Saudi Arabia for Operations Desert Shield and Desert Storm. These broadcasters reported to families of soldiers deployed from Europe and staffed a number of U.S. radio stations making up the Armed Forces Desert Network. The first song on the air after the start of the ground offensive was "Rock the Casbah" by The Clash.

The network first signed on under the name "Desert Shield Network" in Al Jubayl on September 12, 1990, but operated 24-hours of programming since January 2, 1991. As of January 1991, the Desert Shield Network is staffed by more than 50 military broadcasters operating out of four vans in the cities of Riyadh, Dhahran, Al Jubayl, and King Khalid Military City, and reaches nearly 90% of the U.S. military personnel featuring a 50/50 mix of news and contemporary music with jingles produced by JAM Creative Productions during each break of song or news breaks. At the time, the network began producing three minutes of local news per day which later expanded in its lineup. The vans are mobile studios containing 21 relay transmitters carrying radio signals to troops on various FM frequencies depending on location. Right after the operation became known as "Desert Storm", it retained its "Desert Shield Network" name due to the staff expecting to continue operations for an unspecified period of time until the end.

=== Operation Iraqi Freedom ===
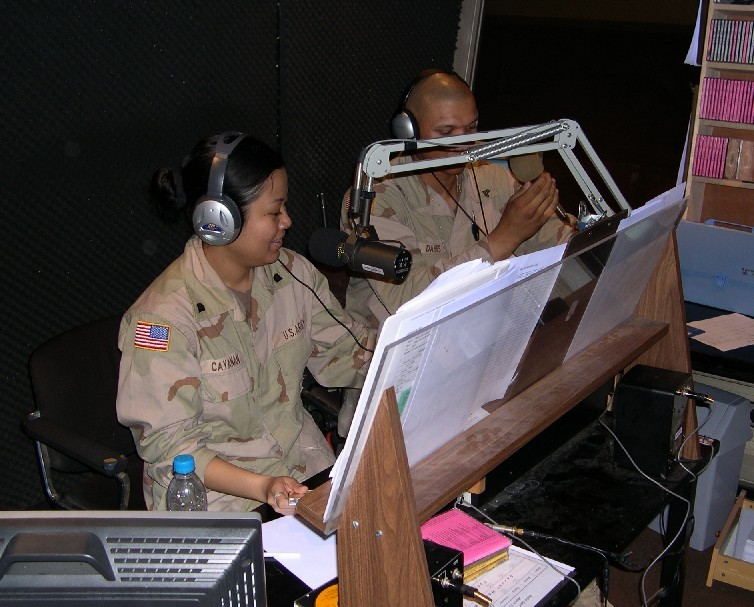
AFN Iraq on-air radio studio. Baghdad, Iraq (April 2004).

AFN-Iraq began broadcasting in December 2003 on the FM band shortly after the fall of Saddam. The first song on the air was "Freedom" by Paul McCartney. Within a short time, Freedom Radio was broadcasting on multiple FM channels from as far south as Basra to as far north as Mosul.

AFN-Iraq, Freedom Radio began as a joint effort between the Air Force, the Marines and the Army. The first unit to operate the station was the 222nd Broadcast Operations Detachment, an Army Reserve unit based in southern California. "Always There and on the Air" was the phrase that started it all, even though there were only eight hours of live radio to kick things off.

After an introduction from Lt. Gen. Ricardo Sanchez, the commander of Coalition Ground Forces in Iraq, Air Force Master Sergeant Erik Brazones was the first DJ on the air. When the 222nd BOD took the reins of the radio operations, the first two regular radio shows were Niki Cage in the Morning and Abbey in the Afternoon. AFN-Iraq signed off in 2011.

=== Operation Enduring Freedom ===
AFN Afghanistan operated out of a building on Bagram Air Base. Its radio frequency throughout Afghanistan was 94.1 and 97.1 in Manas and produced live local shows. Its first radio transmission was at 06 o'clock 30 min on Friday, 21 July 2006. Beyond radio, AFN Afghanistan also had television news. It produced a daily five-minute newscast called Freedom Watch Afghanistan, which also aired on the Pentagon Channel.

The station was typically staffed with Air Force broadcasters but also slots Army, Navy and Marine broadcasters as well. For support there were usually four-man teams of engineers to handle all transmission, decoder and satellite issues.

=== Operations in Western Europe ===
AFN in Germany and SEB (Southern European Broadcasting) in Italy provided broadcasting to U.S. troops in Western Europe throughout the Cold War. The U.S. defense drawdown began in earnest after the Gulf War, and affected AFN stations across Europe, as many stations were consolidated or deactivated with the closing of bases. In Europe, AFN is still on the air from Tuzla, Bosnia, and Taszár, Hungary, to inform and entertain U.S. forces.

AFN went on the air 29 May with service at the Tirana airport in Albania with satellite decoders and large-screen televisions placed in high traffic areas. At the same time, the AFN also advanced into the Yugoslav province of Kosovo along with NATO.

AFN viewers abroad witnessed live television coverage of the terrorist attacks on the United States on 11 September 2001.

During military operations in Afghanistan and Iraq AFN provided non-stop coverage of the campaigns. AFN broadcast personnel from Europe deployed with the troops to cover events. Today AFN has a staffed affiliate in Iraq, AFN-Baghdad (launched in 2003).

Wherever large numbers of U.S. troops are deployed, the AFN sets up operation, providing news and entertainment from home. Today AFN has several satellites and uses advanced digital compression technology to broadcast TV and radio to 177 countries and territories, as well as on board U.S. Navy vessels.

== Media services ==
There were plans for transitioning AFN TV to HDTV with an estimated completion timeframe between 2015 and 2017. However, the conversion to HD is an expensive project, so timelines and actual transition of channels was dependent on availability of funds. In December 2017, AFN converted all of its channels to HD; broadcasts started in the format on December 12.

All programming delivered by satellite is PowerVu encrypted DVB. While programming is provided to AFN by major American TV networks and program syndicators at little to no cost, for copyright and licensing reasons it is intended solely for U.S. forces personnel, authorized Department of Defense civilian employees, State Department diplomatic personnel and their families overseas.

AFN-TV is available to authorized viewers by "Direct-to-Home" (DTH) service with set-top decoders purchased or leased through military exchanges (similar to a membership store), licensed/contracted commercial cable operators, purchased used from other military members (the cheapest option) or terrestrial signal. The advent of DTH service coincides with the phasing-out of AFN terrestrial TV broadcasts due to reclamation of frequencies by host nations.

Most of AFN's programming ceases during government shutdowns. News programming continues as scheduled to provide troops overeseas with updates and commentary from the States. Sports programming to which the AFN has already purchased rights continues to be carried, as the skeleton crew operating AFN for essential programming does not save any money by blacking out the programs.

=== AFN programming ===
While the audience tunes into AFN to watch their favorite shows or listen to the latest stateside hits, entertainment is the "candy coating" used to attract the military viewer/listener. AFN's primary mission is to provide access for worldwide, regional and local command information (CI) spots, which air during commercial breaks in programming instead of commercial advertisements. These CI spots run the gamut from reminding service members to register to vote, promoting local command-sponsored recreation events and off-duty educational programs, providing health and wellness tips, and listing what's playing at local base movie theaters.

AFN also inserts public service announcements from the Ad Council. Some of the 35 overseas AFN affiliates have the capability to cover the "worldwide" CI spots placed by the AFN Broadcast Center in California with regional or locally produced CI spots (such as localized messages from senior leadership).

Many service members welcome this approach, while others find it troublesome, especially during the airing of the Super Bowl.

The network is allowed to broadcast commercial movie promotion trailers provided by the Army & Air Force Exchange Service (AAFES) and the Navy Motion Picture Service (NMPS) to promote the latest film releases in base theaters worldwide. Previously these were the only true "commercials" authorized for broadcast.

AFN Radio and TV schedules are available on the organization's website.

==== Radio ====
AFN also offers a variety of radio programming over its various frequencies throughout the world. There is both local programming (with military disc jockeys) and satellite programming.

On 24 April 2006, AFN Europe launched AFN The Eagle, a virtually 24-hour-a-day radio service format initially modeled after "Jack FM," but most recently a "Hot AC" format. This replaced ZFM, which had more of a contemporary hit radio flavor. When the Eagle was launched, AFN Europe took control of what local DJs could play. This model has since been scaled to the Pacific region as well.

==== Television ====
Like its radio counterpart, AFN TV tries to air programming from a variety of sources to replicate programming on a typical U.S. TV channel; sourcing from U.S. commercial networks (including PBS), and program syndicators at little to no cost since AFN does not air commercials and in that regard cannot profit from airing shows like stations in the United States can. In their place, AFN inserts public service announcements on various subjects; these can be civilian "agency spots" created by the Ad Council, nationally recognized religious and public health charities, or announcements created by regional/local AFN affiliates. The most common PSAs shown deal with force protection/anti-terrorism, public health and safety, sexual harassment, pride in service and messages to the troops.

AFN produces and broadcasts eight core satellite television channels for its authorized audiences. All eight are accessible in core areas, including but not limited to European, Korean and Japanese posts. Much of the rest of the world is limited to a smaller (four channel) but more widespread broadcast.

===== Channels =====
Unless specified, the first telecast of each channel targets the Japan/Korea region, then replayed several hours later for the Central European time zone.

- AFN Prime. Formerly AFN Atlantic and AFN Pacific. The standard AFN feed airs current sitcoms, dramas, syndicated court shows, talk shows, game shows and reality shows popular in the United States, with a time delay from 24 hours to six months or more behind the United States airdates. In addition, popular U.S. soap operas such as General Hospital are aired by AFN on a one-week tape delay. This stream is divided into three feeds (AFN Prime Atlantic, AFN Prime Freedom (Middle East) and AFN Prime Pacific); the difference between the three is that they are time-shifted so that programs air at the same local time in each of the major regions served: Japan/Korea, Central Europe and Iraq. Many regional feeds (such as AFN-Europe and AFN-Korea) are based on AFN Prime and add local programming to it; thus, in a way, AFN Prime mimics the regular network TV concept. AFN Prime Freedom started in 2006 as a customized time-shifted version of AFN Prime for Afghanistan and shuttered services in June 2013 after the drawdown of troops from the Middle East.
- AFN Spectrum. AFN Spectrum started as more of a conservative culture-oriented channel with programming from cable networks and classic TV series. In a way, it mimicked the "superstation" concept from cablecasters TBS and WGN America. However, the Spectrum lineup currently contains more conventional programming, like American Idol and Ugly Betty, as some of the public television and classic fare that made up Spectrum is being reduced but remain the primary constant on the channel.
- AFN News. AFN News is a rolling-news channel providing news from all major news outlets. Newscasts, such as the NBC Nightly News, Fox News, ABC World News Tonight and CBS Evening News, were all scheduled to air in the mornings so viewers could watch the headlines live, but now they air on a tape delay in the regular early evening slot, back to back.
- AFN Family/AFN Pulse. AFN Family is a general entertainment channel providing programming for children ages 2 to 17. Although the name of the channel suggests programming appropriate for all family members at any time, the channel more closely resembles Freeform or Nickelodeon, with programming targeted at specific age groups during the course of the day. Programming during after school from 3 p.m. local time to 1 a.m. local time targets pre-schoolers but "ages" as older children become available to watch in the late morning and day. By 1 a.m. local time, programming is targeted at older teens. In September 2013, AFN launched a split in Family, which was branded AFN Pulse. About half of the day's programming remains aimed at the 2-to-13 age group. During primetime hours, the channel becomes AFN Pulse, and showcases programming primarily aimed at the older teen demographic, though it remains suitable for family viewing.
- AFN Movie. AFN Movie is a channel showcasing movies as well as film-oriented programming.
- AFN Sports. AFN Sports is a rolling-sports channel, providing sports news and events, including ESPN's SportsCenter and live and delayed broadcasts of the NFL, NBA, NASCAR, MLB, NHL, NCAA college football, men's and women's NCAA college basketball, FIFA soccer and PGA Tour, as well as other highly rated team competitions. Most major boxing and martial arts events, including all pay-per-view events from WWE and other promoters, airs on the channel with no additional payment to the viewer.
- AFN Sports 2. Launched in February 2006, as AFN Xtra. It is AFN's exclusive home for UFC and WWE programming, including all pay-per-view events, as well as motor sports, including NASCAR, NHRA, Motocross, and other auto and motorcycle racing series.

== Internet radio ==
In November 2013, the American Forces Network launched Internet radio streams expanding the reach of the military network's radio programming overseas.

=== Regional stations ===
==== AFN Europe ====
The physical/internet radio stations in Europe are as follows:

- Aviano
- Bahrain
- Bavaria
- Benelux
- Guantanamo Bay
- Incirlik
- Kaiserslautern
- Naples
- Rota
- Sigonella
- Souda Bay
- Spangdahlem
- Stuttgart
- Vicenza
- Wiesbaden

==== AFN Pacific ====
The physical/internet radio stations in the Asia-Pacific region are as follows:

- Daegu
- Diego Garcia
- Casey
- Iwakuni
- Kunsan
- Misawa
- Okinawa
- Sasebo
- Tokyo

=== AFN Go programs ===
AFN Go, formerly AFN 360, provides the following radio stations.

- AFN The Eagle: Hot AC mix with live local shows. It's the only AFN Go station that is available on terrestrial radio.
- AFN Country: Country music
- AFN FANS: Sports radio (Fox Sports Radio plus The Jim Rome Show and Sports Overnight America)
- AFN Gravity: Urban contemporary hit radio
- AFN The voice: Short-form news updates and timeshifts of Powertalk programs
- AFN Mach 5: EDM
- AFN Freedom Rock: Rock music
- AFN The Groove: Old School R&B
- AFN Jazz+: Jazz
- AFN Hall of Fame: Chart toppers from the 1960s onward

In November 2022, AFN launched a streaming video service named AFN Now with mobile applications for Android (operating system), iOS, Roku, & Amazon FireTV

== AFN frequencies and transmitters by country (alphabetical) ==
=== Bahrain ===
Radio: AFN Bahrain

- 106.3 FM: serves NSA Bahrain and Manama

=== Belgium ===
Television:

Historical data only – AFN Prime Atlantic/AFN Benelux (NTSC)

- 33H: Everberg, (Kortenberg) oriented towards Evere (2 kW)
- 34V: SHAPE, Casteau (4.5 kW)
- 34V: Florennes (10 W)

Terrestrial transmission of the AFN TV service in Belgium ended in 2010.

Radio: AFN Benelux – The Eagle

- 101.7 FM: Everberg, Kortenberg (900 W), 50°52'10.19 N 4°34'41.60 E; serving NATO HQ and much of northern Brussels Capital Region
- 106.2 FM: Kleine Brogel, Peer (200 W), 51°10'20 N 5°27'28 E
- 106.5 FM: SHAPE, Casteau (200 W), 50°29'50 N 3°59'15 E
- 107.9 FM: Chièvres (100 W), 50°35'00 N 3°50'40 E

Frequency	Power	Location	Description of transmitter site	geographical location	Remarks
101.7 MHz	1 kW	Everberg		50.869497 N 4.578222 E	
106.2 MHz	0.1 kW	Kleine-Brogel/Air Base		51.172222 N 5.457778 E	
106.5 MHz	0.2 kW	Casteau-Shape		50.497222 N 3.987500 E	
107.9 MHz	0.1 kW	Chièvres/Air Base		50.583333 N 3.844444 E	

=== Canada ===
VOUS (AM) transmitted locally for Naval Station Argentia with a repeater in St. John's for Pepperrell Air Force Base (1941 to 1961).

Frequency	Power	Location	Description of transmitter site	geographical location	Remarks
1480 kHz	50 W	Naval Station Argentia	45.6-metre guyed lattice steel mast insulated against ground with a BC-250-GY Gates transmitter	47°17′58.6″N 53°56′50.9″W	VOUS (AM)

=== Cuba ===
Radio GTMO transmits locally for Guantanamo Bay Naval Base.

- 1340 AM: News and talk radio rebroadcasts (coordinates of mast: 19.941530 N 75.115691 W )
- 102.1 FM: Top 40, urban, dance, rock music
- 103.1 FM: Country music

=== Germany ===
==== Mediumwave AM ====
As the transmission frequencies in the medium wave range were reassigned or adapted to the 9 kHz grid in 1978 as part of the implementation of the Geneva Wave Plan, the values used before 1978 can also be found in the table.

Frequency	Power	Location	Description of transmitter site	Geographical location	Remarks
873 kHz (until 1978: 872 kHz)	150 kW	Weisskirchen	3 guyed lattice steel masts insulated against ground, height: 86 meters (282 ft), Directional Antenna Mode	50°10′59″N 8°36′45″E	Shut down on 31 May 2013
1107 kHz (until 1978: 935 kHz)	10 kW	Berlin-Dahlem	126-meter-tall (413 ft) guyed lattice steel mast insulated against ground	52°27′47″N 13°17′26″E	Shut down on 15 July 1994, Mast demolished on 14 December 1996
1107 kHz (until 1978: 611 kHz)	10 kW	Grafenwöhr	66-meter-tall (217 ft) guyed tubular steel mast insulated against ground	49°42′47″N 11°54′42″E	Shut down in 2008; Mast dismantled in 2009
1107 kHz (until 1978: 611 kHz)	10 kW	Kaiserslautern-Otterbach	136-meter-tall (446 ft) guyed lattice steel mast insulated against ground	49°29′27″N 7°43′3″E	Shut down on 31 August 2014
1107 kHz (until 1978: 1106 kHz)	40 kW	Munich-Ismaning	2 guyed lattice steel masts insulated against ground, height: 94 meters (308 ft)	48°14′40″N 11°44′42″E	Shut down in 2005
1106 kHz	50 kW	Mühlacker	110-meter-tall (360 ft) guyed lattice steel mast insulated against ground	48.9417 N 8.8489 E	replaced in 1963 by transmitter in Hirschlanden
1107 kHz (until 1978: 611 kHz)	10 kW	Nürnberg	122-meter-tall (400 ft) guyed lattice steel mast insulated against ground	49.445989 N 10.996319 E	Shut down
1107 kHz	10 kW	Vilseck	65-meter-tall (213 ft) guyed tubular steel mast insulated against ground	49°38′41″N 11°47′1″E	Shut down on 31 October 2016 (last German AM station)
1143 kHz (until 1978: 1142 kHz)	300 W	Bad Hersfeld	25-meter-tall (82 ft) free-standing tower insulated against ground	~50.857514 N 9.737982 E	Shut down
1143 kHz (until 1978: 1034 kHz)	300 W	Bad Kissingen	48-meter-tall (157 ft) guyed mast radiator		shut down
1143 kHz (until 1978: 1304 kHz)	300 W	Bamberg	40-meter-tall (130 ft) guyed lattice steel mast insulated against ground	49°53′17″N 10°55′24″E	Shut down in December 2013
1143 kHz (until 1978: 1394 kHz)	1 kW	Bitburg	54-meter-tall (177 ft) guyed mast radiator	49°56′35″N 6°32′29″E	Shut down in 2013
1143 kHz (until 1978: 1142 kHz)	5 kW	Bremerhaven	65-meter-tall (213 ft) guyed mast radiator	53.5798889 N 8.56047222 E	Shut down on 31 March 1993
1143 kHz (until 1978: 1304 kHz)	300 W	Fulda	54-meter-tall (177 ft) guyed mast radiator	~50.536182 N 9.720572 E	Shut down
1143 kHz (until 1978: 1502 kHz)	300 W	Giessen	61-meter-tall (200 ft) guyed lattice steel mast insulated against ground	50°35′27″N 8°43′6″E	Shut down
1143 kHz (until 1978: 1142 kHz)	300 W	Göppingen	37-meter-tall (121 ft) guyed mast radiator	~50.536182 N 9.720572 E ?	Shut down
1143 kHz (until 1978: 1304 kHz)	1 kW	Heidelberg	65-meter (213 ft) guyed tubular steel mast insulated against ground	49°25′58″N 8°38′42″E	Shut down on 28 April 2014
1143 kHz (until 1978: 1142 kHz)	10 kW	Stuttgart-Hirschlanden	40-meter-tall (130 ft) guyed lattice steel mast insulated against ground	48°49′43″N 9°2′11″E	Operated by Media Broadcast; Shut down, 7 March 2014
1143 kHz (until 1978: 1394 kHz)	1 kW	Hof	45-meter-tall (148 ft) guyed mast radiator	50.318412 N 11.894564 E	Shut down
1143 kHz (until 1978: 1034 kHz)	1 kW	Karlsruhe	61-meter-tall (200 ft) guyed mast radiator	49.0287 N 8.4275 E	Shut down
1143 kHz	1 kW	Mönchengladbach	45.5-meter-tall (149 ft) guyed lattice steel mast insulated against ground	51°10′2″N 6°23′56″E	Shut down on 27 January 2016
1143 kHz (until 1978: 1142 kHz)	300 W	Schweinfurt	T-antenna between 2 40-foot-tall (12 m)? free-standing lattice towers	50°3′6″N 10°10′31″E	Shut down in 2014
1143 kHz	300 W	Spangdahlem		49.9601 N 6.6827 E	in service from 2013 to 2015
1143 kHz (until 1978: 1142 kHz)	1 kW	Ulm		48.4321 N 9.9845 E	Shut down in the 1980s
1143 kHz (until 1978: 1304 kHz)	300 W	Wertheim		49.7575 N 9.5224 E	Shut down
1143 kHz (until 1978: 1502 kHz)	300 W	Wildflecken	45-meter-tall (148 ft) guyed mast radiator		Shut down
1143 kHz (until 1978: 1142 kHz)	300 W	Würzburg	40-meter-tall (130 ft) guyed lattice steel mast insulated against ground	49°47′26″N 9°58′54″E	Shut down in 2008
1485 kHz (until 1978: 1034 kHz)	300 W	Ansbach-Katterbach	67-meter-tall (220 ft) guyed tubular steel mast insulated against ground	49°19′17″N 10°35′44″E	Shut down
1485 kHz (until 1978: 1394 kHz)	1 kW	Augsburg	56-meter-tall (184 ft) guyed lattice steel mast insulated against ground	48°21′8″N 10°51′19″E	Shut down in 1998 mast demolished in 2008
1485 kHz (until 1978: 1304 kHz)	300 W	Berchtesgaden	34-meter-tall (112 ft) guyed mast radiator		Shut down
1485 kHz	300 W (until 1978: 1394 kHz)	Crailsheim	65-meter-tall (213 ft) guyed mast radiator	49.1408 N 10.0442 E	Shut down
1485 kHz (until 1978: 1502 kHz)	300 W	Garmisch-Partenkirchen	30-meter-tall (98 ft) guyed mast radiator	47°28′58″N 11°3′20″E	Shut down
1485 kHz (until 1978: 1502 kHz)	300 W	Hohenfels	40-meter-tall (130 ft) guyed lattice steel mast insulated against ground	49°13′14″N 11°51′12″E	Shut down
1485 kHz (until 1978: 1304 kHz)	300 W	Regensburg	Long wire antenna on wooden 20-meter (66 ft) tower		Shut down

==== FM ====
Frequency	Power	Location	Description of transmitter site	geographical location	Remarks
87.7 MHz	0.1 kW	Schweinfurt		50°3'13" N 10°12'54" E	Shut down
87.9 MHz	1 kW	Berlin			Now used by Star FM Maximum Rock
89.9 MHz	0.245 kW	Amberg		49°25'49 N 11°50'49 E	Transmits AFN Bavaria
90.3 MHz	0.05 kW	Garmisch-Partenkirchen		47°29'16 N 11°03'47 E	Transmits AFN Bavaria
90.3 MHz	0.02 kW	Prien		47°49'52"N 12°18'0" E	Shut down
92.2 MHz		Memmingen			Shut down
92.9 MHz		Garlstedt			Shut down
93.5 MHz	1 kW	Sögel			Shut down
93.5 MHz	0.25 kW	Hohenfels		49°13'44 N 11°50'43 E	Transmits AFN Bavaria
96.5 MHz		Helmstedt			Shut down
97.7 MHz	0.1 kW	Bad Aibling			Shut down
98.5 MHz	1 kW	Grafenwoehr		49°40'08 N 11°49'54 E	Transmits AFN Bavaria
98.7 MHz	50 kW	Grosser Feldberg		50.232162 N 8.457327 E	Shut down on 19 January 2017
98.7 MHz		Birkenfeld			Shut down
98.9 MHz	0.1 kW	Bamberg		49°37'19 N 7°19'58 E	Shut down
100 MHz	15 kW	Augsburg	158.5-meter-tall (520 ft) concrete tower	10°43'06 N 48°26'53" E	Shut down
100.2 MHz	5 kW	Kaiserslautern-Vogelweh		49°25'46 N 7°41'01 E	now 105.1 MHz
102.3 MHz	100 kW	Stuttgart	193-meter-tall (633 ft) concrete tower	48°45′49″N 9°12′20″E	Deutsche Telekom transmitter
102.6 MHz		Schwäbisch Gmünd			Shut down
102.6 MHz		Ulm			Shut down
103.0 MHz	0.375 kW	Pirmasens		49°12'53 N 7°36'42 E	
103.7 MHz	0.5 kW	Wiesbaden/Mainz-Kastel		50°04'35 N 8°16'14 E	Opened on 19 January 2017 (in exchange for Grosser Feldberg)
104.1 MHz		Grafenwöhr		49°40'08 N 11°49'54 E	Moved to 98.5 MHz
104.6 MHz	0.375 kW	Heidelberg	Aerial on AM broadcasting mast	49°25′58″N 8°38′42″E	Shut down
104.9 MHz	0.375 kW	Illesheim		49°28'25 N 10°22'36 E	Moved to 98.5 MHz
104.9 MHz	0.16 kW	Würzburg	Aerial on AM broadcasting mast	49°47′26″N 9°58′54″E	Shut down
105.1 MHz	1 kW	Spangdahlem	Lattice tower	49°59'01 N 6°41'31 E	
105.1 MHz		Kaiserslautern		49°25'46 N 7°41'01 E	Transmits AFN Kaiserslautern
105.1 MHz		Rheinberg			Shut down
105.2 MHz		Hessisch Oldendorf			Shut down
106.1 MHz		Kalkar			Shut down
106.1 MHz	0.02 kW	Baumholder		49°37'19 N 7°19'58 E	Transmits AFN Kaiserslautern
106.5 MHz		Flensburg			Shut down
107.3 MHz	1 kW	Ansbach		49°18'50 N 10°38'21 E	Transmits AFN Bavaria
107.3 MHz		Mannheim-Käfertal		49°31'21 N 8°31'17 E	Shut down
107.4 MHz	0.3 kW	Fürth			Shut down
107.6 MHz		Bad Godesberg		50.668711 N 7.152063 E	Shut down
107.7 MHz	0.25 kW	Vilseck		49°38'33 N 11°47'46 E	Transmits AFN Bavaria
107.9 MHz		Bremerhaven		53.539499 N 8.596621 E	Shut down

See also . The AFN transmitters in Germany are operated by different authorities but most are operated directly by the U.S. military. Some are the property of Deutsche Telekom, while others are controlled by German public broadcasting corporations.

=== Greece ===
- 107.3 MHz FM
  - Souda Bay Air Base (35°29'04.00 N 24°04'28.00 E)

=== Honduras ===
- 106.3 MHz FM
  - Soto Cano Air Base. 20 W

=== Iraq Freedom Radio ===
[All Freedom Radio–Iraq stations went off the air on 30 September 2011, as a result of the continuing draw-down of U.S. Military personnel. Listing remains to document the coverage of Iraq.]

- 93.3 MHz FM
  - Baghdad (FOB Union III) – Transmitter Never Completed
  - Fallujah (Camp Baharia)
  - Al Taqaddum Airbase (TQ)
- 101.1 MHz FM
  - Tikrit (COB Speicher)
- 104.5 MHz FM
  - Baquba (FOB Warhorse) – Transmitter Never Completed
- 105.1 MHz FM
  - Mosul (Camp Diamondback/FOB Marez) – 1 kW
- 107.3 MHz FM
  - Al Asad Airbase
  - Balad (LSA Anaconda) – 250 W
  - Nasiriyah (Tallil Air Base) – 200 W
  - Qayyarah Airfield West (Q-WEST) – 250 W
  - Ramadi (FOB Blue Diamond)
  - Samarra (FOB Brassfield-Mora)
  - Camp Taji
  - Tall Afar (FOB Sykes)
  - Umm Qasr (Camp Bucca)
- 107.7 MHz FM
  - Baghdad (Camp Slayer) – 1 kW

=== Italy ===
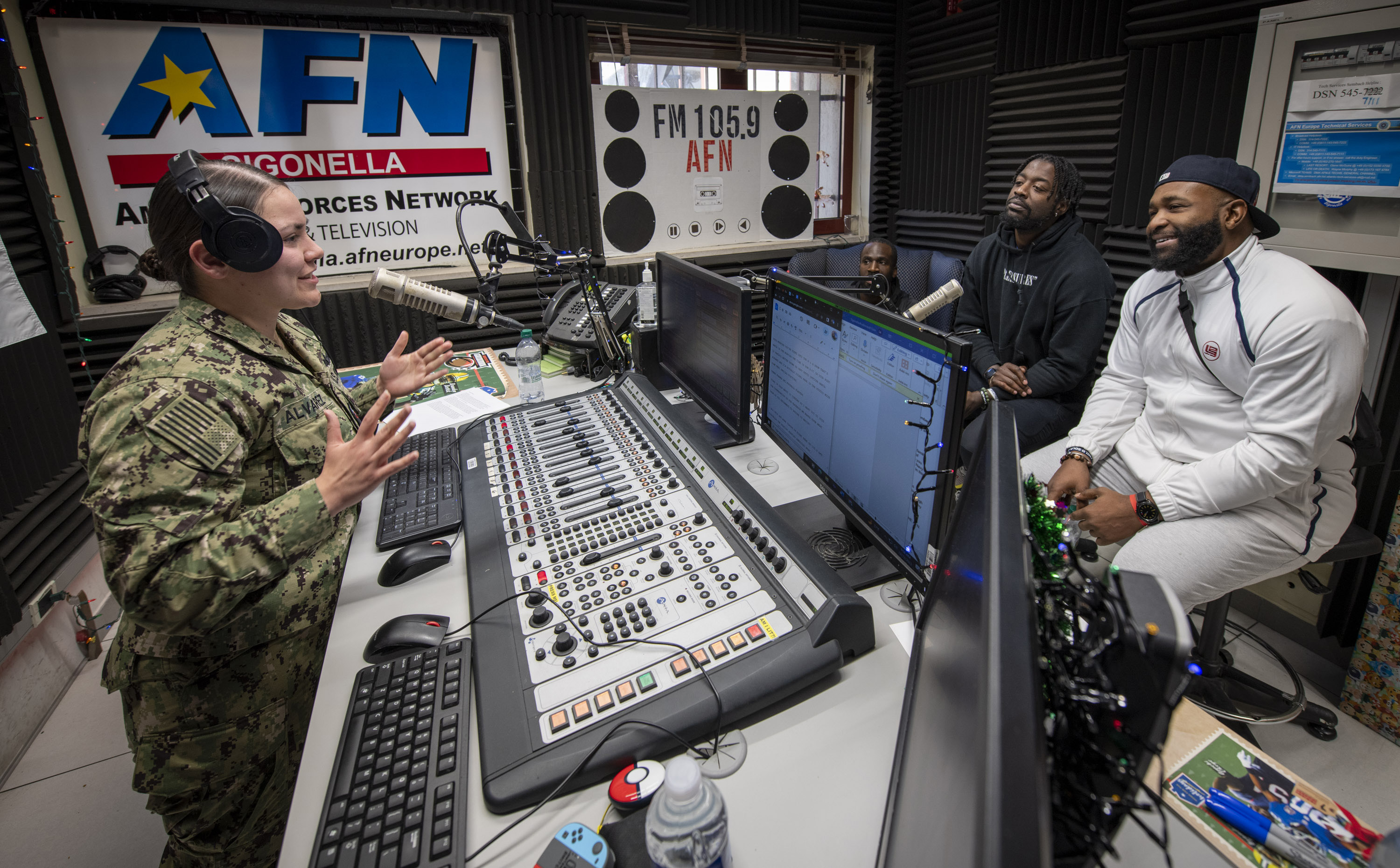
A host at American Forces Network Sigonella holds on-air interviews with former NFL players Prince Amukamara, Amobi Okoye and Brandon Bostick in 2023

In Italy there are 4 radio stations that serve 5 bases and more than 14 cities:

- AFN The Eagle – 106.0 FM
  - Monte Serra – AFN Livorno (43°29'33.22 N 10°21'09.76 O) (After the closing of AFN Livorno it will be transmitted AFN Vicenza) in Pisa (Camp Darby), Livorno, Viareggio and the surrounding area.
  - Monte Venda – AFN Vicenza in Vicenza (45°28'15 N 11°00'04 O) (Caserma Ederle and Del Din), Verona, Venezia, Padova, Sud Treviso and the surrounding area.
  - Aviano – AFN Aviano in Pordenone (Aviano Air Base) ( 46°05'16 N 12°31'57 E), Udine and the surrounding area.
- AFN Naples – 107.9 FM Collina dei Camaldoli Naples (Naval Base), Caserta, South Avellino and the highest zones (there are interferences)
- AFN Sigonella ( 37°28'00 N 14°57'00 E) – 105.9 FM in Catania (Naval and Air Base), North Siracusa and the surrounding area.
- AFN Power Network
  - Monte Serra – AFN Livorno Power (After the closing of AFN Livorno it will be transmitted AFN Vicenza) in Pisa (Camp Darby), Livorno, Viareggio and the surrounding area.
  - Monte Venda (45°28'16.09 N 11°00'05 E) – AFN Vicenza Power in Vicenza (Caserma Ederle and Del Din), Verona, Venezia, Padova, Sud Treviso and the surrounding area.
  - Collina dei Camaldoli ( 40°51'28.90 N 14°11'56.10 E) – AFN Naples Power in Naples (Naval Base), Caserta, South Avellino and the highest zones (there are interferences).
  - Sigonella ( 37°28'00.00 N 14°57'00.00 E) – AFN Sigonella Power in Catania (Naval and Air Base), North Siracusa and the surrounding area.
  - Aviano ( 46°05'16.00 N 12°31'57.00 E) – AFN Aviano Power in Pordenone (Aviano Air Base), Udine and the surrounding area.

AFN Italy, has been serving Americans that live on American Bases in Pisa, Vicenza, Aviano, Napoli and Sigonella, since 1983.

Frequency table

Frequency	Power	Location	Description of transmitter site	geographical location	Remarks
97.3 MHz	31.6 kW	Napoli/Camaldoli 4 (EI)		40.858042 N 14.198914 E	
105.3 MHz	100 kW	Lusiana/Monte Corno-Vecchio		45.798220 N 11.547092 E	
105.9 MHz	3.2 kW	Motta Sant'Anastasia/Base NA		37.466667 N 14.95 E ?	
106.0 MHz	125.9 kW	Aviano/Castaldia-Piancavallo		46.087958 N 12.532386 E	
106.0 MHz	25.1 kW	Livorno/Castellaccio-Via del		43.492573 N 10.352707 E	
106.0 MHz	15.8 kW	Verona/Torricelle		45.470970 N 11.001212 E	
107.0 MHz	125.9 kW	Aviano/Castaldia-Piancavallo		46.087958 N 12.532386 E	
107.0 MHz	125.9 kW	Bassano del Grappa/Frazione		45.802614 N 11.670636 E	
107.0 MHz	15.8 kW	Verona/Torricelle-Via Santa		45.470970 N 11.001212 E	

=== Japan ===
- 648 kHz AM
  - Camp Kinser: Urasoe, Okinawa. 10 kilowatts (kW).
- 810 kHz AM
  - Yokota Air Base: Western Tokyo. 50 kW transmitted from Wakō, Saitama. Serves the Greater Tokyo Area. Station uses the on-air ID "Eagle 810".
- 1575 kHz AM
  - Marine Corps Air Station Iwakuni: Iwakuni, Yamaguchi. 1 kW. Station uses the on-air ID "Power 1575".
  - Misawa Air Base: Misawa, Aomori. 600 W.
  - United States Fleet Activities Sasebo: Sasebo, Nagasaki. 250 W.
- 89.1 MHz FM
  - Kadena Air Base: Kadena, Okinawa. 20 kW. Station uses the on-air ID "Wave 89".
- US Television channel 11
  - Camp Foster: Okinawa.

=== Netherlands ===
Radio: AFN Soesterberg 1964–1993 (former location at grid 52°7'25"N 5°15'13"E) Transmissions ceased at the dissolution of USAF 32nd TFS

- AM – AFRS Soesterberg (1140 kHz syndicated 1964–1972 from AFN Bremerhaven) 5 kW
- FM – AFN Eagle Radio (93.1 MHz live & syndicated 1973–1994 from Camp New Amsterdam/Soesterberg airbase) 0.015 kW

The morning "Touch and Go" show from 5–9 am and the afternoon "Afterburner" show from 3–6 pm were live. The rest of the hours was syndicated from AFN Frankfurt.

Television: AFN Benelux syndicated (early 1980s only UHF channel 80 NTSC)

Currently active radio & TV:

- 107.9 MHz FM
  - Volkel Air Base (51°41'01.28 N 5°40'41.48 E) (AFN Benelux)

Frequency table

Frequency	Power	Location	Description of transmitter site	geographical location	Remarks
99.7 MHz	0.25 kW	Brunssum/NATO JFC		50.937575 N 5.979056 E	
107.9 MHz	0.1 kW	Zeeland/Nieuwveldsestraat		51.683689 N 5.678189 E	

=== Saudi Arabia ===
Table of AFN-transmitters in Saudi Arabia. Table may be incorrect and incomplete. Please correct and expand if necessary.

==== FM ====
Frequency	Power	Signal Type	City	Transmitter site	Approximate Geographical Location	Channel Name (Slogan)	Genre
103.1 MHz	100 W	Mono	Riyadh	Eskan Village (Al-Kharj Rd.)	24°34′59″N 46°51′39″E	Voice Channel (NPR News)	News, Talkshows, Jazz & Oldies
103.9 MHz	100 W	Mono	Riyadh	Eskan Village (Al-Kharj Rd.)	//	Mainstream Country	Country
105.1 MHz	100 W	Mono	Riyadh	Eskan Village (Al-Kharj Rd.)	//	Z Rock	Alternative rock
105.9 MHz	100 W	Mono	Riyadh	Eskan Village (Al-Kharj Rd.)	//	Gravity	Urban Rhythmic (R&B, Pop & Hip hop)
107.9 MHz	100 W	Mono	Riyadh	Eskan Village (Al-Kharj Rd.)	//	Hot AC (Today's Best Hits)	Young adult alternative/80's and 90's
103.1 MHz	21 W	Stereo	Riyadh	Riyadh U.S. Embassy	24°40′52″N 46°37′13″E	Voice Channel (NPR News)	News, Talkshows, Jazz & Oldies
105.1 MHz	10 W	Stereo	Riyadh	Riyadh U.S. Embassy	//	Z Rock	Alternative rock
107.9 MHz	30 W	Stereo	Riyadh	Riyadh U.S. Embassy	//	Mainstream Country	Country
93.7 MHz	250 W	Mono	Jeddah	Jeddah U.S. Embassy	21°31′33″N 39°09′52″E	Hot AC (Today's Best Hits)	Young adult alternative/80's and 90's
100.7 MHz	250 W	–	Jeddah	Jeddah U.S. Embassy	//	Voice Channel (NPR News)	News, Talkshows, Jazz & Oldies
103.9 MHz	50 W	Stereo	Jeddah	Jeddah U.S. Embassy	//	Jack FM	1980s & 1990s

The AFN FM Transmitters in Saudi Arabia are managed by the U.S. military.

=== Spain ===
Radio: AFN Rota Radio – The Eagle

- 102.5 FM: Naval Station Rota (5.0 kW)
- 92.1 FM: Morón Air Base in Morón de la Frontera, Seville. (0.015 kW)

Frequency	Power	Location	Description of transmitter site	geographical location	Remarks
92.1 MHz	0.1 kW	Morón de la Frontera		37.133333 N 5.433333 W	
102.5 MHz	4 kW	Rota		36.616667 N 6.350000 W	

=== South Korea ===
==== Television ====
NOTE: All over-the-air television broadcasts in South Korea ended in May 2012. The following are previous stations.

- Channel 2 (VHF)
  - Chuncheon, Gangwon (100 W)
  - Jinhae, South Gyeongsang (100 W)
- Channel 12 (VHF)
  - Daegu, North Gyeongsang (Camp Walker, Camp Henry, Camp Carroll) (1 kW)
- Channel 19 (UHF)
  - Paju-ri, Gyeonggi
- Channel 34 (UHF) (former Channel 2 VHF)
  - Yongsan-gu, Seoul (USAG Yongsan, Camp Market, K-16 Airbase) (30 kW)
- Channel 49 (UHF)
  - Dongducheon, Gyeonggi (Camp Red Cloud, Camp Casey, Camp Stanley) (1 kW)
  - Munsan, Gyeonggi (5 kW)
  - Songtan, Gyeonggi (Osan Air Base, USAG Humphreys) (1005 W)
  - Gunsan, North Jeolla (Kunsan Air Base...) and Gwangju (2.5 kW)
  - Waegwan, North Gyeongsang (Camp Carroll, South Korea) (100 W)
- Channel 58 (UHF)
  - Uijeongbu, Gyeonggi (Camp Red Cloud, Camp Sears, Camp Stanley) (100 W)
  - Pyeongtaek, Gyeonggi (USAG Humphreys) (100 W)
  - Wonju, Gangwon (100 W)

==== AM Radio (Thunder AM) ====
- 1440 kHz
  - Daegu, North Gyeongsang (Camp Walker, Camp Henry, Camp Carroll) (5 kW)
  - Waegwan, North Gyeongsang (Camp Carroll, South Korea) (250 W)
- 1161 kHz
  - Uijeongbu, Gyeonggi (Camp Red Cloud, Camp Stanley, Camp Jackson) (250 W)
- 1197 kHz
  - Dongducheon, Gyeonggi (Camp Red Cloud, Camp Casey, Camp Stanley, Camp Jackson) (1 kW)
- 1260 kHz
  - Busan, South Gyeongsang (5 kW)
- 1359 kHz
  - Songtan, Gyeonggi (Osan Air Base, USAG Humphreys) (1 kW)
- 1440 kHz
  - Munsan, Gyeonggi and Paju-ri, Gyeonggi (5 kW)
  - Chuncheon, Gangwon (250 W)
  - Pyeongtaek, Gyeonggi (USAG Humphreys) (1 kW)
  - Wonju, Gangwon (250 W)
  - Gunsan, North Jeolla (Kunsan Air Base) (1 kW)
- 1512 kHz
  - Jinhae, South Gyeongsang (250 W)
  - Pohang, North Gyeongsang (250 W)
  - Jeju (50 W)
- 1530 kHz
  - Yongsan-gu, Seoul (USAG Yongsan, Camp Market, K-16 Airbase) (5 kW)

==== FM Radio (AFN Eagle) ====
- 88.1 MHz
  - Busan, South Gyeongsang (250 W)
- 88.3 MHz
  - Dongducheon, Gyeonggi (Camp Red Cloud, Camp Casey, Camp Stanley) (250 W)
  - Pyeongtaek, Gyeonggi (USAG Humphreys) (50 W)
  - Wonju, Gangwon (50 W)
- 88.5 MHz
  - Uijeongbu, Gyeonggi (Camp Red Cloud, Camp Stanley, Camp Jackson) (100 W)
  - Munsan, Gyeonggi and Paju-ri, Gyeonggi (50 W)
  - Chuncheon, Gangwon (50 W)
  - Songtan, Gyeonggi (Osan Air Base, USAG Humphreys) (30 W)
  - Gunsan, North Jeolla (Kunsan Air Base) (50 W)
  - Gwangju, South Jeolla (505 W)
  - Daegu, North Gyeongsang and Waegwan, North Gyeongsang (Camp Walker, Camp Henry, Camp Carroll)(1 kW)
  - Jinhae, South Gyeongsang (50 W)
- 102.7 MHz
  - Yongsan-gu, Seoul (USAG Yongsan, Camp Market, K-16 Airbase...) (5 kW)

resource:

=== Turkey ===
Radio: AFN Incirlik – The Eagle

- 1590 AM: Incirlik Air Base, 5 W
- 107.1 FM: Incirlik Air Base

=== Shortwave (USB) ===
The last known confirmation of AFN using its shortwave frequencies was in the mid-2010s. Current (2022) bandscans show no signal on any of AFN's frequencies.

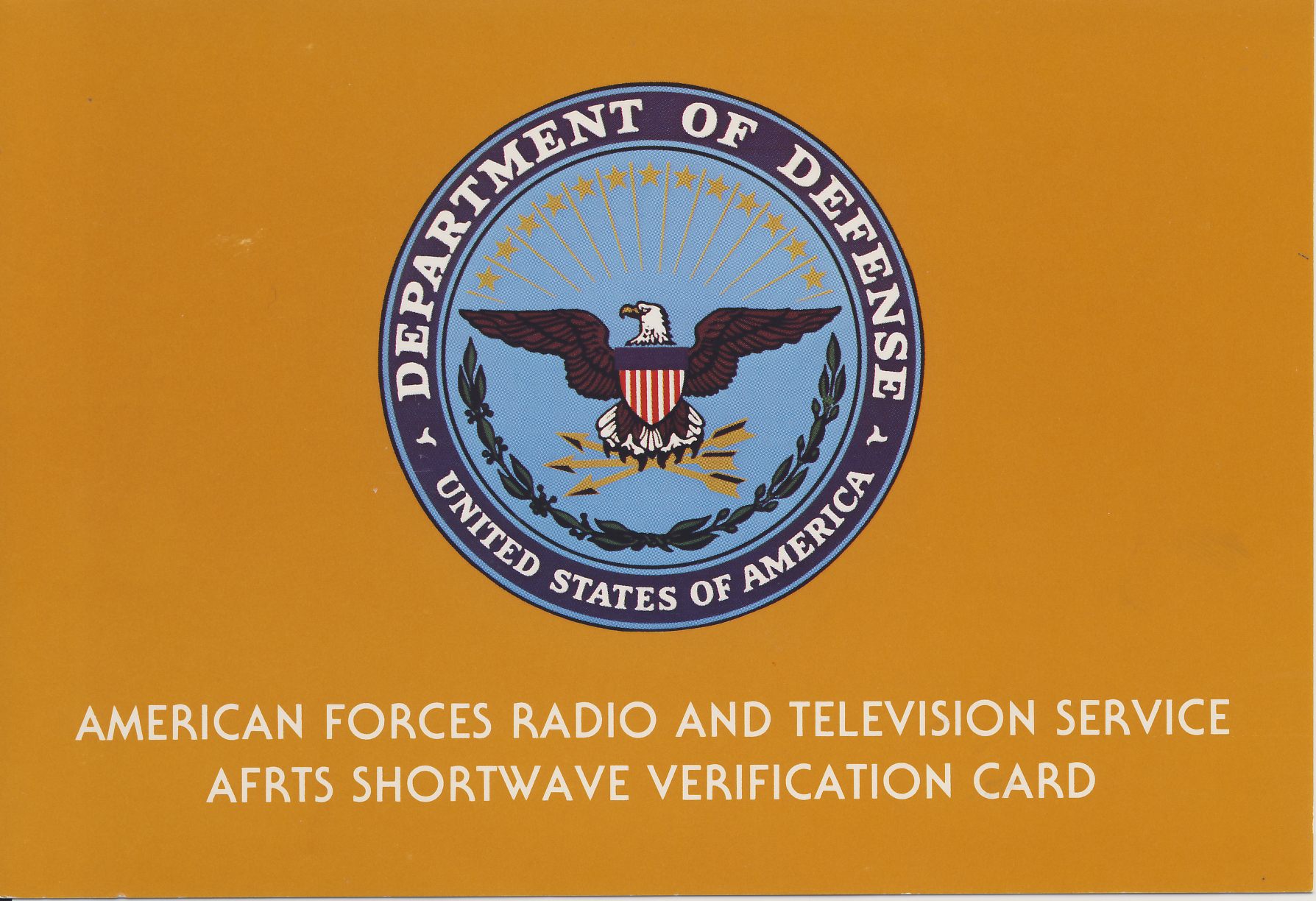
QSL card from AFRTS

- Diego Garcia:
  - 12.579 MHz daytime
  - 4.319 MHz nighttime
- Guam:
  - 13.362 MHz daytime
  - 5.765 MHz nighttime
- Key West, Florida:
  - 12.1335 MHz day & night
  - 7.811 MHz day & night
  - 5.4465 MHz day & night
- Pearl Harbor, Hawaii
  - 10.32 MHz daytime
  - 6.35 MHz nighttime

See: AFN Shortwave Frequencies

== See also ==
- Chris Noel
- AFN Berlin
- British Forces Broadcasting Service
- Canadian Forces Radio and Television
- CCTV-7
- DoD News Channel
- Far East Network
- Inter-Services Public Relations
- Israeli Army Radio
- Radio forces françaises de Berlin
- Radio Wolga
- RTA 5 (Thailand)
- VoyenTV
- Zvezda (TV channel)
