= Sergeant Eric L. Coggins Award =

The Sergeant Eric L. Coggins Award of Excellence was established in 1997 under the direction of Major General Walter B. Huffman, at the time the Judge Advocate General of the United States Army. The purpose of the annual award is to recognize the junior enlisted Paralegal Specialist who best embodies the standards for which Coggins was known.

Coggins was a Paralegal Specialist in Korea whose skills led to his selection as the Noncommissioned Officer in Charge (NCOIC) of the Camp Stanley Legal Office while still a Specialist. After his Korean tour Coggins volunteered for duty in Kuwait where he became NCOIC of the Camp Doha Legal Office, and was awarded the Meritorious Service Medal. After his death from liver cancer, the award was established in his honor.

== Recipients ==
- SSG Raymond Sarluca (2025) - 75th Ranger Regiment, Fort Benning, GA
- SGT Walkker J. Shaw (2024) - 11th Airborne Division, JBER, Alaska
- SSG Zakira Moton (2023) - 1st Cavalry Division, Fort Hood, TX
- SSG Jacob Rottluff (2022) - 75th Ranger Regiment, Fort Benning, GA
- SSG Roderick L. Armstrong, Jr. (2021) - 1st Cavalry Division, Ft Hood, TX
- SSG Nathan Ramos(2019) - 1st Cavalry Division, Fort Hood, TX
- SGT DeJamine M. Bryson(2018) - 8th TSC, Schofield Barracks, HI
- SSG Sarah E. Hawley (2017) - USAR Legal Command, Gaithersburg, MD
- SSG Cardia L. Summers (2016) - USASOC, 75th Ranger Regiment, Ft Benning, GA
- SGT Maran E. Hancock (2015) - Ft Gordon, GA
- SSG Angelica Pierce (2014) - Ft Gordon, GA
- SSG Ana I. Hairston (2013) - 101st Airborne Division, Ft Campbell, KY
- SSG Raymond Richardson, Jr. (2012) - USASOC, 75th Ranger Regiment, Ft Benning, GA
- SSG Margarita G. Abbott (2011) - 82d Airborne Division, Ft Bragg, NC
- SSG Juan C. Santiago (2010) - USARPAC, Hawaii
- SSG Jose A. Velez (2009) - FORSCOM, Ft McPherson, GA
- SSG Samuel R. Robles (2008) - USASOC, 75th Ranger Regiment, Ft Benning, GA
- SSG Francisco R. Ramirez (2007) - Presidio, CA
- SSG Joshua L. Quinton (2005) - USAREUR, Germany
- SSG Troy D. Robinson (2004) - FORSCOM, Ft McPherson, GA
- SSG Osvaldo Martinez, Jr. (2003) - USAREUR, Germany
- SSG Melissa Burke (2002) - USAREUR, Germany
- SGT Ryan L. Wischkaemper (2001) - USAREUR, Germany
- SSG Michele L. Browning (2000) - USAREUR, Germany
- SGT David M Panian (1999) - USASOC, Ft Bragg, NC
- SSG Michelle A. Winston (1998) - FORSCOM, Ft McPherson, GA
