= 604th Squadron =

604th Squadron may refer to:

- No. 604 Squadron RAF
- 604th Air Support Operations Squadron, United States Air Force
- 604th Special Operations Squadron, United States Air Force
