= Camp Market =

U.S. army base in Incheon, South Korea

Coordinates: 37°29′41″N 126°42′43″E

Camp Market is an installation of the United States Army, based on the Yongsan Garrison and it is situated in Bupyeong District, Incheon, South Korea. It is around halfway between Yongsan Garrison and the Port of Incheon, 30 miles to the west. The camp is not usually operated by U.S. Army divisions, except the 55th Military Police Company, which settled permanently in this camp. Unlike most Eight Army camps in South Korea, it is a supply depot. It is operated by civilian forces, mostly Korean nationals. It is now used as an Army & Air Force Exchange Service bakery and distribution Center.

== History ==
The camp was constructed during the mid 1930s by the Imperial Japanese Army. In 1945, Japan surrendered to the U.S. Army, and the U.S. Army permanently designated the post as a DSAFE depot. Other operations include usage as an ASCOM (Army Support Command) complex. AMC and CECOM started relying on their contractors for communication and defense equipment. Their solution was to make united civilian-powered contactor complexes called the ESSC. These complexes were located at Fort Bragg, North Carolina, Fort Hood, Texas; Friedrichsfeld, Germany and Camp Market. The complexes could support six Intelligence Electronic Warfare Regional Support Centers. The ASCOM area's acronym comes from the names of Camp Grant, Camp Market, Camp Tyler and Camp Hayes. The USMC Support Command for South Korea and the Inchon Replacement Center were the first major tenants at ASCOM after the Korean War. As no transport network was available between the northern and southeastern areas, huge logistics hubs were built at ASCOM complexes. In 1972, ASCOM operations were phased down and in 1973 most of the ASCOM complex was turned over to the Republic of Korea Ministry of National Defense. All necessary support operations were moved to Camp Humphreys.

== About the camp ==
The post has no official name, but it is usually known as Camp Market. It is known as a Depot Support Activity Far East(DSAFE) post, one of its warehouses is located here in Bupyeong. This operation significantly supported other U.S. Army operations in South Korea, by providing logistics and production aid. This installation houses the marketing office, the Printing and Publications Command - Korea and the defense reutilization of Army & Air Force Exchange Service services. It was used as a Kimpo Mail Facility. It is headquarters to the 55th Military Police Company. The camp's size is around 900 thousand square feet. It has around 600 permanent staff, mostly Korean nationals, individual contractors and the Korean Service Corps. It currently has limited facilities such as a gymnasium, swimming pool, community center, picnic areas and several snack bars.

== Current use ==
The camp is mainly used to produce and supply all bread and pastry products to other U.S. Army installations in the country. It also houses 34 warehouse units for storing the products produced at the camp. It is currently in limited use; most operations either ceased or were moved to other active camps. Its gates are permanently closed and a specific gate for supply trucks is designated, it is barricaded and shut with a metal gate when not in access with external suppliers. The camp is closing down, and only a small number of security guards are seen at the post. The camp has increased concerns of residents of Bupyeong due to soil contamination. When a US Army installation closes down, the South Korean government has to spend millions of dollars to decontaminate the soil to minimize concerns to people living near the post.

== Seen in 2016 ==
Currently in Buyeong Park soil is heavily contaminated, and it is now closed until 2017 for a decontamination process. The land will be returned to the South Korean government. The camp itself is now very obsolete; concrete walls with barbed wire on the top encloses the post. There is text on the walls saying "U.S Government Property, no trespassing". At night the post is lit with old lamp posts. Buildings of the post can be seen through former access points. A silhouette of a small, old factory with two tall chimney columns and storage tanks can be spotted occasionally while travelling around the Bupyeong District. Brown signs written in English can still be seen on the gates. The Bupyeong District Council is in conflict with the residents, because they are worried about the soil contamination and other pollutants that may be dispersed from the camp. As there are many schools in the area, decontamination needs to be done urgently. There is another ROKA Infantry and Supply camp in the district, and four more Reserve Army Training camps are about to settle in the area. Due to this, residents' concerns on safety are becoming bigger.

== Old transport link with the post ==
The post is connected with an obsolete railway link that used to provide transport to the post. The railway linked other areas such as Seoul and the Port of Incheon. It was important in logistics support operations when bigger camps such as USAG Humphreys did not exist. All support operations are carried out at Humphreys, and Camp Market was declared obsolete. The railway signal points are not scrapped until now, although they are situated on a busy road. Small trains were spotted operating on the railway at around 2008, and no more train operations were seen after that date. Some of the railway still exist, with ballast on the ground. The railway crosses many apartment suites in Bupyeong.

== See also ==
- List of United States Army installations in South Korea
- Camp Casey
- Camp Red Cloud
- Yongsan Garrison
- Camp Humphreys
