= Korean Augmentation to the United States Army =

Republic of Korea Army branch

Korean Augmentation to the United States Army KATUSA
- 미합중국 육군 증강 한국군
- The Eighth United States Army shoulder sleeve insignia
- Active: July 1950 – present (76 years)
- Country: South Korea
- Part of: Republic of Korea Army; Eighth United States Army
- Motto: Solidarity (단결)
- Engagements: Korean War

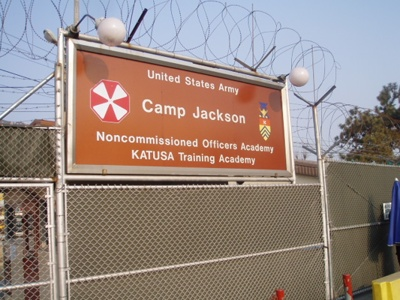
The KATUSA Training Academy, Camp Jackson, South Korea

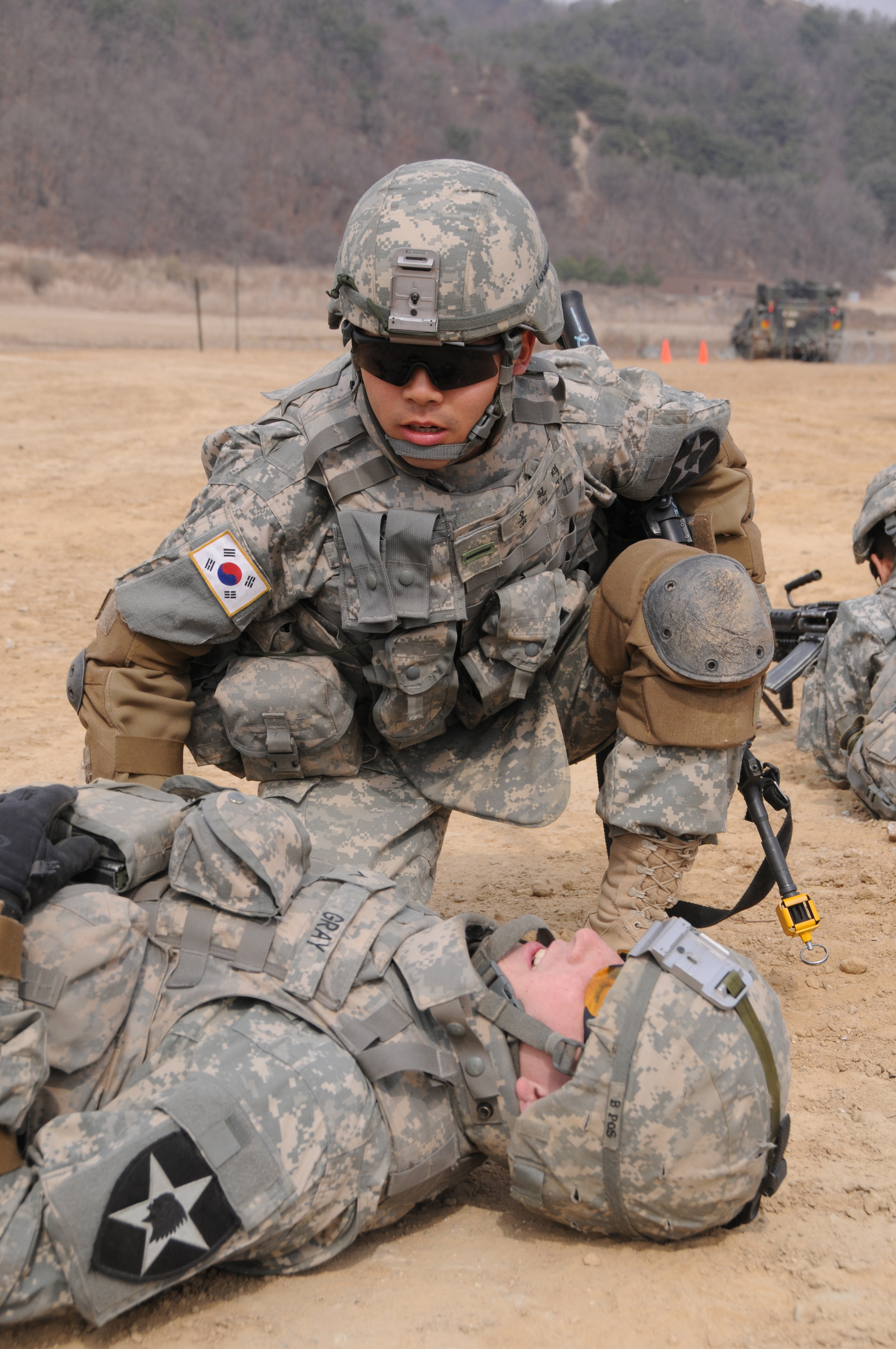
A KATUSA soldier assigned to 2nd Battalion, 9th Infantry Regiment, 1st Heavy Brigade Combat Team, 2nd Infantry Division is wearing the U.S. Army's then standard cut of the Army Combat Uniform in Universal Camouflage Pattern in April 2009. KATUSA units now wear the latest modern ACU uniform cut in the Operational Camouflage Pattern.

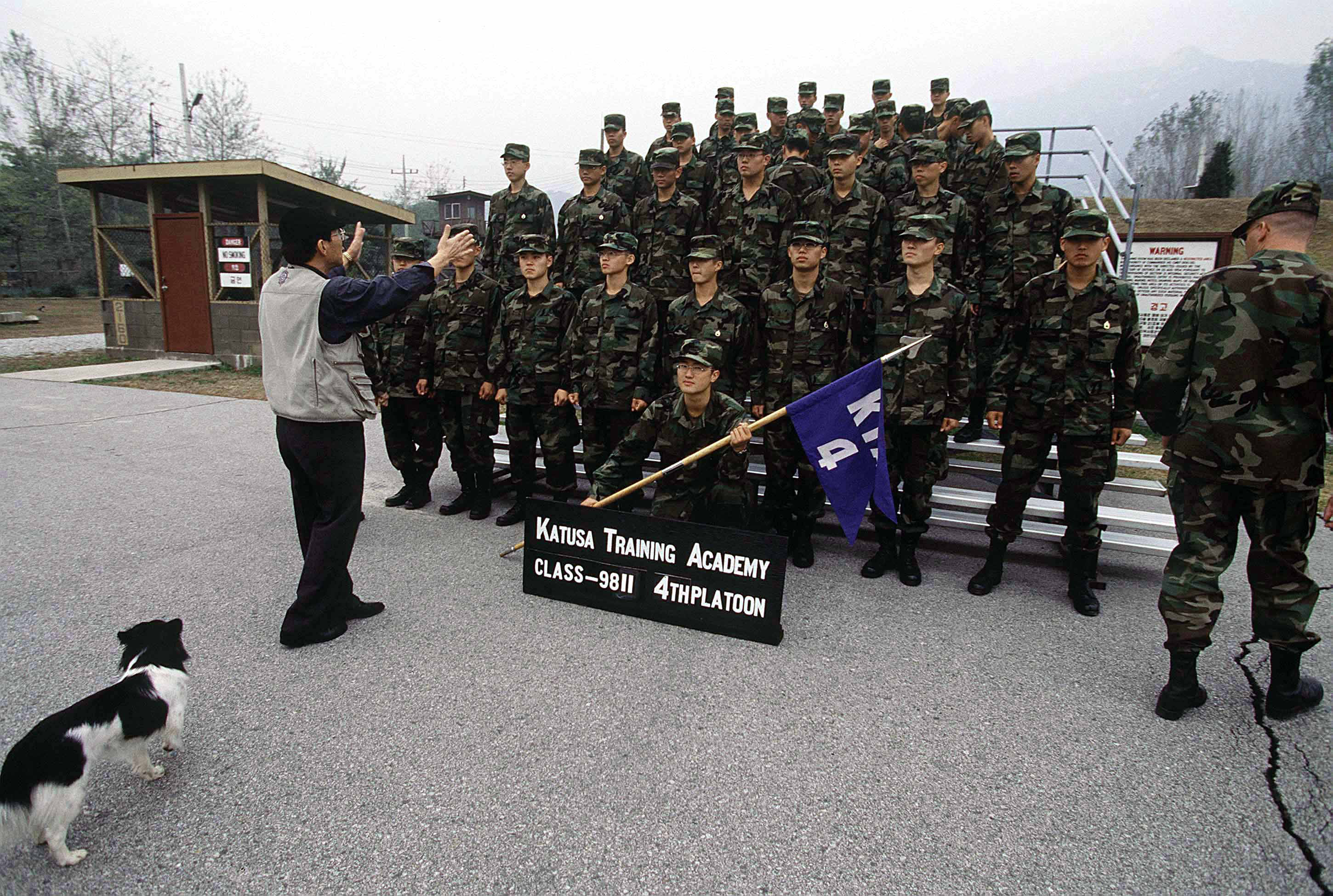
KATUSA training academy

Korean Augmentation to the United States Army (KATUSA; Korean: 카투사) is a branch of the Republic of Korea Army that consists of Korean enlisted personnel who are seconded to the Eighth United States Army (EUSA). KATUSA does not form an individual military unit. Instead, small numbers of KATUSA members are assigned to positions in most of the departments of the Eighth United States Army, filling in for United States Army enlisted soldiers and junior non-commissioned officers. KATUSAs are selected from a pool of qualified volunteers who are subject to mandatory military service for male Korean citizens.

While the ROK Army retains responsibility for personnel management of KATUSAs, KATUSA members are equipped with standard United States Army issues, and live and work with the U.S. enlisted soldiers.

The KATUSA program was developed during the Korean War as a temporary measure to cope with a shortage of personnel in the United States Army. This augmentation program is the only one of its kind in the United States Army.

== Purpose ==
The KATUSA program provides the U.S. military with Korean-speaking soldiers, allowing greater military functionality and maneuverability throughout the Korean peninsula. KATUSA soldiers are assigned to each Eighth United States Army unit with their Military Occupational Specialty like the United States Army soldiers and do the part of their MOS. KATUSA soldiers serve as interpreters between the local populace and the U.S. Army, and help the U.S. maneuver in unfamiliar terrain.

Informally, they help U.S. soldiers new to the peninsula understand Korean customs and a bit of the language. It saves the U.S. money and manpower, and symbolizes the two nations' friendship and mutual support. The KATUSA program remains essential for the safety of the Republic of Korea, for establishing partnerships with American Armed Forces, and to learn from each other and to assist each other, especially with the threat of North Korea looming over South Korea.

The primary objective of the KATUSA Soldier Program is to bolster the Army in Korea by integrating ROK Army Soldiers, enhancing the collective defense capabilities of ROK/U.S. forces on the Korean peninsula. This program holds immense significance, not solely due to the military workforce and fiscal savings it offers the U.S. Army. It also symbolizes the cooperation between ROK and U.S. forces and their joint commitment to preventing conflict. The KATUSA Soldier Program is a tangible representation of the enduring friendship and mutual support between the Republic of Korea and the United States. (United States Eighth Army, 2024)

All U.S. Army and ROKA personnel within the theater must uphold the effectiveness of the KATUSA Soldier Program, by adhering to the guidelines outlined in the Army in Korea Regulation 600–2. Regardless of their affiliation with the U.S. Army or ROKA, individuals are strongly encouraged to contribute suggestions and recommendations to enhance the KATUSA Soldier Program.

According to Richard Weiz (2013), author of "An Enduring Partnership: South Korea and the United States", The North Korean threat continues to provide the fundamental basis for the ROK-U.S. security relationship...The most recent period of tensions flared up after the North's long-range rocket launch in December 2012 and underground nuclear test in February 2013" (Pg. 310).

Providing valuable information on the peninsula as well as translations, KATUSA soldiers carry out their MOS effectively, allowing for a future of more foreign cooperation with America. Nirav Patel and Lindsey Ford (2009), authors of "The future of the U.S.-ROK alliance: global perspectives", state that "The alliance between the United States and the Republic of Korea (ROK) has been a key component of America’s bilateral alliance system in Asia for almost 60 years.

South Korea has been a close friend and valued partner during difficult circumstances, even when personal relations between U.S. and ROK leaders were at a low ebb"

== History ==
The KATUSA system was established in August 1950 during the Korean War. It was started as a spoken agreement between President Syngman Rhee and U.S. General Douglas MacArthur. At that time, the U.S. Army needed a military force that had the proper knowledge of the geography of Korea, and the abilities to distinguish allied troops (South Korea) from enemy troops (North Korea) and communicate better between U.S. soldiers and Korean soldiers.

Therefore, some were drafted to KATUSA by force, and others joined voluntarily. After training, they were divided into the U.S. military, such as 2nd Division, 7th Division, 24th Division, 25th division, 1st Cavalry Division, 1st Marine Divisions. During the Korean War, 43,660 KATUSA soldiers fought for South Korea with U.S. forces. Of these soldiers, 11,365 went missing, or were killed in action.

This program continued after the Korean War, and KATUSA soldiers would spend 18-months with the U.S. Army learning his occupation and would then return to the ROK Army for training others on the occupation. According to the Eighth Army Wightman NCO Academy, "With the establishment of the ROKA Training Center in 1963...KATUSA soldiers began to spend their whole military tour in the U.S. Army".

The KATUSA program grew to 27,000 soldiers by 1952 and declined to 15,000 by 1959. A 1954 study examined KATUSA soldiers' wartime experiences and their positive perceptions of American treatment and the United States overall. A 1958 study reaffirmed these positive sentiments, reflecting high ratings from South Koreans serving in American units. The passage delves into the attitudes of both American and Korean soldiers toward integrated units, shedding light on preferences and satisfaction levels.

Lastly, it underscores the U.S. Army's ongoing recognition of the benefits of integrated units, emphasizing the reciprocal advantages of personal interactions between American and KATUSA soldiers during off-duty hours. Upon assignment to this program, ROKA soldiers had undergone only basic training at the ROKA Replacement Training Centers and had limited or no active service. Initially, they were often sent directly to U.S. units with minimal military training. Typically, they were integrated into infantry units, with a small number assigned to each squad, primarily performing basic tasks such as riflemen.

While some were promoted to NCO rank within the ROKA while serving as KATUSA, they were not placed in positions of authority over U.S. troops and generally served as privates within U.S. units. U.S. commanding officers had discretion in their deployment, aiming to utilize integrated Korean troops effectively. An Eighth Army directive explicitly stated that KATUSA should be employed comparable to U.S. personnel and could not be formed into all-Korean units.

The term "Korean Army Troops, United States Army" referred to KATUSA as an increase in personnel, distinct from integration, implying their attachment to U.S. forces rather than membership in a ROKA unit. KATUSA was not to be used for common labor or cargo-carrying assignments, except for specific duties outlined by Army policies. While KATUSA received pay from ROKA appropriations at ROKA scales, they were provided with equipment, clothing, food, and other supplies on the same basis as other U.N. troops.

== KATUSA Code of Conduct ==
As a member of the Republic of Korea Army augmented to the Eighth United States Army, I will sacrifice myself to defend my country and her principles. I vow to abide by the following Code of Conduct for unification and honour of my country:

1. I do my best to accomplish given duties with a high spirit of a soldier to become a role model of the ROKA soldiers.
2. I abide by regulations and reinforce the combined combat power with positive and active working attitude.
3. I take pride in myself as a military ambassador and affirmatively encourage the mutual relations between the two armies.

== Selection process ==
To become a KATUSA, eligible Korean draftees must demonstrate a minimum level of English-language proficiency by achieving minimum passing scores on standardized English tests. There are eight different exams, and people can choose one from them. The eight exams are: TOEFL, TOEIC, TEPS, G-TEP LEVEL 2, FLEX, OPIC, TOEIC SPEAKING and TEPS SPEAKING. The three most popular exams people take are TOEFL, TOEIC, TEPS. The minimum scores for getting into the lottery are 83 for TOEFL (iBT only), 780 for TOEIC, and 299 for TEPS.

KATUSA candidates may apply through the Military Manpower Administration (MMA), upon which their name is entered into a lottery system. Conscripts with qualifying test scores are selected on a random basis by the Korean government, with all eligible candidates having an equal chance of winning. Applicants may only apply once.

Once selected, KATUSAs must complete six weeks of ROK Army basic training. A brief orientation and OJT is conducted by the United States Army before they begin their full-time duty with a U.S. Army unit garrisoned in Korea for the duration of their military service.

The number of candidates vying for an available opening is extremely high because many soldiers believe that the U.S. Army is less abusive and more professional in its training and treatment of soldiers compared with the ROK Army, and that junior enlisted personnel receive better treatment, have more educational opportunities (especially with regards to learning English), experience a higher standard of living, and have an overall better quality of life than their ROK counterparts. In 2012, roughly 3,400 KATUSA soldiers served with 25,000 United States Forces Korea (USFK), versus 4,800 in 2005 and 11,000 in 1968.

As the number of U.S. soldiers in South Korea decreases, the number of KATUSA soldiers is decreasing as well. The ratio of KATUSA soldiers to U.S. soldiers is roughly 1:10.

== U.S. Air Force ==
While many Republic of Korea Air Force members in Korea work alongside U.S. Air Force members, there is no KATUSA program with the USAF counterpart. ROKAF retains their own unit and command structure separate from their USAF counterparts.

== Criticism ==
Since the KATUSA program started off as a temporary measure during the war and has continued in a like manner, there has been no legal legitimisation of the program under Korean law to date. The oral agreement between General MacArthur and President Rhee on conscripting Korean civilians for the U.S. Forces was never documented. A memorandum for assigning operational command of the ROK Army to General MacArthur by President Rhee, known as Pusan Letter, is considered the only justification for the KATUSA program in South Korea. EUSA designates the state of KATUSA program in Army in Korea Regulation 600–2.

Since KATUSA soldiers do not undergo special education for their MOS before their deployment, and their mission training relies heavily on OJT from senior to junior KATUSAs, new KATUSAs usually take a few months of incubatory period before they can fully perform.

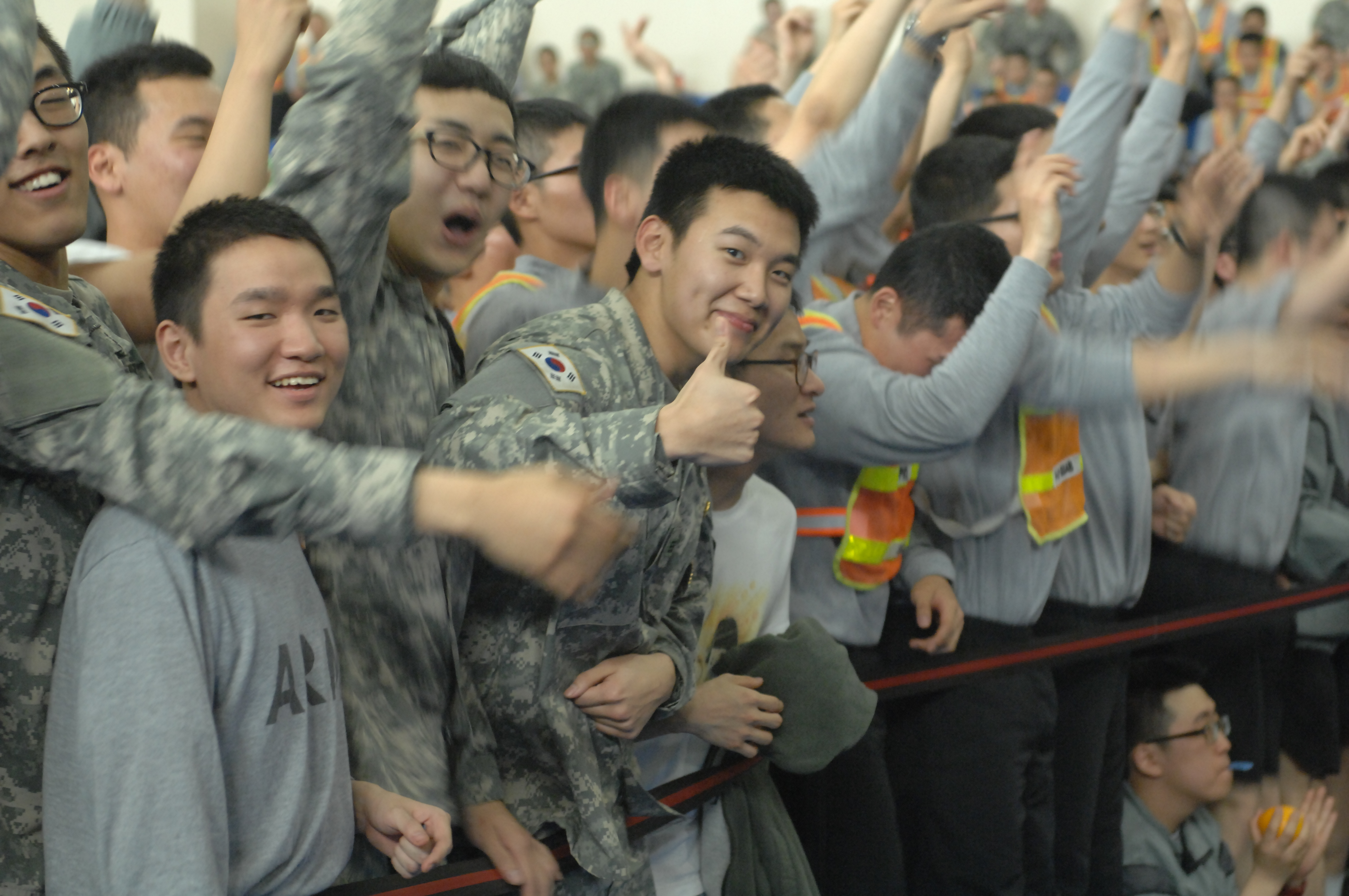
KATUSA U.S. Friendship Week, Camp Humphreys, South Korea

One criticism of the KATUSA program arises from the difference in promotion systems; the ROK Army promotes its enlistees on a quota/time basis and not through the merit system. A KATUSA soldier may be senior in rank to an American counterpart with significantly more field experience. However, this criticism is usually rebutted by the counter-argument from the United States Forces Korea, that such promotion of KATUSA soldiers is sufficiently warranted, given the fact that KATUSA soldiers usually possess at least two years of college experience, which would translate to an advanced enlisted rank for US soldiers.

Another criticism arising from the Korean Army side is based on the fact that most of the KATUSA soldiers are from the top universities in Korea. For the ROKA, this means that they are losing intelligent soldiers to the US Army. To minimize this, the selection process now randomly picks soldiers from the pool of applicants, instead of hiring the most qualified soldiers.

The selection process requires applicants to submit their English proficiency test scores as a mandatory document. A driver's license and computer software proficiency test scores such as Microsoft certificates, qualify applicants who are eligible to be drivers or administrators. These measures were introduced to diversify the pool of applicants throughout Korean Army soldiers, but a lot of intelligent soldiers still enlist as a KATUSA for the superior facilities and treatment. A holistic and random approach is used to quality candidates into different units, and this variety of exam results seems to affect significantly into which positions each applicant is placed.

Some of the recent criticisms from the South Korean side include alleged forced-recruitment during the 1950–53 Korean War, when the 7th Infantry Division commandeered reinforcements for the landing at Incheon. These so-called "First KATUSA soldiers" included 313 men from Busan. The South Korean side claims they were taken from refugee camps, but whether they volunteered or were coerced remains a matter of dispute.

== See also ==
- KATCOM, a similar system operating in the 1st Commonwealth Division.
