= 604th Air Support Operations Squadron =

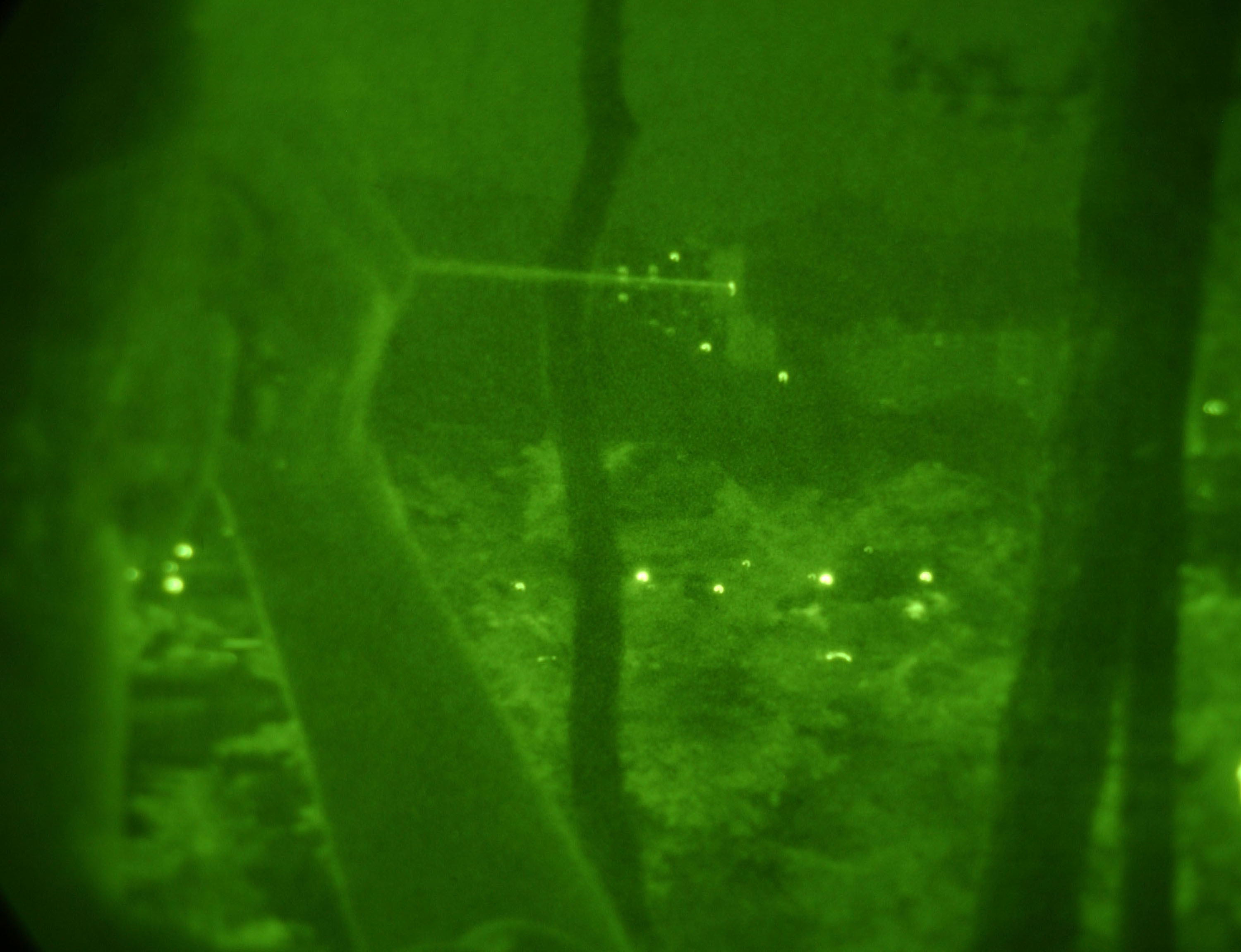
- Night vision photo of 604th terminal air controller illuminating a target with a laser designator
- Active: 1968–1971; 1976–present
- Branch: United States Air Force
- Role: USFK Air Support Operations
- Part of: Pacific Air Forces
- Garrison/HQ: Camp Humphreys, Republic of Korea
- Motto(s): Tally Ho
- Mascot(s): Iron Duck
- Engagements: Iraq War
- Decorations: Air Force Outstanding Unit Award

Insignia
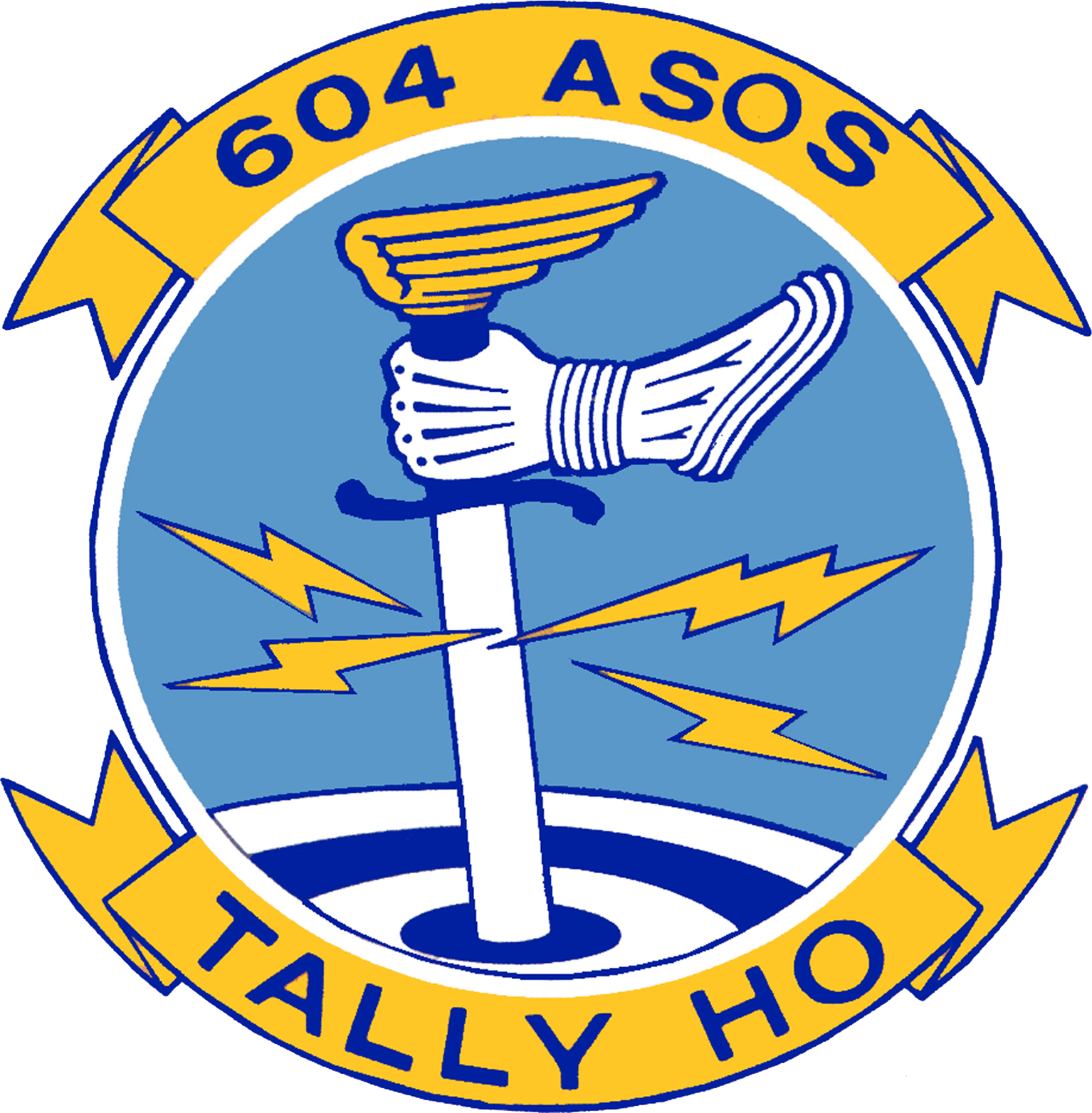
- 604th Air Support Operations Squadron emblem(approved on 12 August 1969)

The 604th Air Support Operations Squadron is a United States Air Force unit located at Camp Humphreys, Republic of Korea. The 604th provides tactical command and control of airpower assets through the use of joint terminal attack controllers to the Joint Forces Air Component Commander and Joint Forces Land Component Commander for combat operations within the Korean peninsula.

== Mission ==
The 604th provides joint terminal attack controllers and Air Liaison Officers to direct close air support to Army units with which they are embedded. The squadron's controllers coordinate air strikes with direct fire missions. The squadron's Air Liaison Officers advise Army commanders on the optimum use of airpower resources to support the Army.

== History ==
The squadron was first activated at Wheeler Air Force Base, Hawaii in September 1968 as the 604th Direct Air Support Squadron to provide Air Force personnel to man a Direct Air Support Center, an element of the Tactical Air Support System coordinating air support at the Corps level. It absorbed the mission, personnel and equipment of the 7th Direct Air Support Flight, which had been performing the mission at Wheeler since October 1964 under 326th Air Division, and which was simultaneously inactivated. The squadron was inactivated in May 1971.

Five years later, in June 1976, the squadron was activated once again in Korea, when it replaced the 603d Direct Air Support Squadron. Squadron members were stationed in detachments at Camp Red Cloud, Camp Humphreys, and Camp Casey, South Korea, where they train to support both United States and Republic of Korea Army forces. The squadron supports the United States Eighth Army. From 15 December 1994 through 13 February 1998, the terminal air controllers were organized into a separate colocated unit, the 607th Air Support Operations Center Squadron.

In 2018, in conjunction with the closure of Camp Red Cloud, the squadron was relocated to Camp Humphreys, where it is currently located.

== Lineage ==
- Constituted as 604th Direct Air Support Squadron on 26 August 1968

Activated on 15 September 1968
Inactivated on 17 May 1971

- Activated on 15 June 1976

Redesignated 604th Air Support Operations Center Squadron on 15 December 1989
Redesignated 604th Air Support Operations Squadron on 13 February 1998

=== Assignments ===
- 5th Tactical Control Group, 15 September 1968 – 17 May 1971
- 51st Composite Wing, 15 June 1976
- 5th Tactical Air Control Group (later 5th Tactical Control Group, 5th Air Control Group), 8 January 1980
- 51st Wing (later 51st Fighter Wing), 1 July 1993
- 607th Air Support Operations Group, 15 December 1998 – present

=== Stations ===
- Wheeler Air Force Base, Hawaii, 15 September 1968 – 17 May 1971
- Camp Red Cloud, Republic of Korea, 15 June 1976 – 1 November 2018
- Camp Humphreys, Republic of Korea, 1 November 2018 – Present

=== Awards and campaigns ===
Award streamer	Award	Dates	Notes
	Air Force Outstanding Unit Award	2 May 1970–15 May 1971	604th Direct Air Support Squadron
	Air Force Outstanding Unit Award	1 July 1982–30 June 1984	604th Direct Air Support Squadron
	Air Force Outstanding Unit Award	1 July 1984–30 April 1986	604th Direct Air Support Squadron
	Air Force Outstanding Unit Award	1 December 1986–2 October 1988	604th Direct Air Support Squadron
	Air Force Outstanding Unit Award	1 July 1984–30 April 1986	604th Direct Air Support Squadron
	Air Force Outstanding Unit Award	1 December 1986–2 October 1988	604th Direct Air Support Squadron
	Air Force Outstanding Unit Award	3 October 1988–30 September 1990	604th Direct Air Support Squadron (later 604th Air Support Operations Center Squadron)
	Air Force Outstanding Unit Award	1 July 1993–30 June 1995	604th Air Support Operations Center Squadron
	Air Force Outstanding Unit Award	1 July 1995–30 June 1997	604th Air Support Operations Center Squadron
	Air Force Outstanding Unit Award	1 July 1999–30 June 2001	604th Air Support Operations Squadron
	Air Force Outstanding Unit Award	1 September 2001–30 August 2003	604th Air Support Operations Squadron
	Air Force Outstanding Unit Award	1 October 2006-30 September 2008	604th Air Support Operations Squadron
	Air Force Outstanding Unit Award	2 November 2010-1 November 2012	604th Air Support Operations Squadron
