= VoyenTV =

Belarusian government-owned television company

VoyenTV ВоенТВ
- Country: Belarus
- Founded: 15 April 1994
- Headquarters: Minsk
- Broadcast area: Belarus
- Nation: Belarus
- Launch date: January 1995
- Former names: Central Television and Radio Broadcasting Studio of the Ministry of Defense
- Former affiliations: National State Television and Radio Company of Belarus
- Official website: www.voentv.mil.by/ru/

VoyenTV (Russian: ВоенТВ) is the television and production arm of the Ministry of Defence of Belarus. It is today the only television company in Belarus with unlimited access in military units and formations of the Armed Forces of Belarus. It was founded on 15 April 1994. The commissioning of the company in the form of an editorial board was on 15 October 1992 by order of the Council of Ministers of Belarus. At the time, it was a subdivision of the National State Television and Radio Company of Belarus. The staff eventually grew to 28 people which resulted in the purchase of new equipment and the regularity of military reports. In January 1995, the studio was renamed to the Central Television and Radio Broadcasting Studio of the Ministry of Defense. In 2002, on the basis of the Television and Radio Broadcasting Studio, the VoenTV Television Company was established.
