= Camp Stanley =

Former U.S. Army military camp in South Korea

Coordinates: 37.7208°N 127.0967°E

- Uijeongbu, South Korea

Site information
- Type: Military Post
- Controlled by: United States Army

Site history
- Built: Established as a tent city in 1955. The first buildings constructed in 1969.
- In use: 1955-2017; 2022-Present

Garrison information
- Garrison: Camp Red Cloud

Camp Stanley is a former U.S. Army military camp located just east of the city of Uijeongbu, South Korea. The camp is part of the Red Cloud Garrison which is composed of Army installations near the Korean Demilitarized Zone (DMZ).

Camp Stanley began as a tent city in 1954. The first U.S. Army helicopters moved to the camp later that year and aviation units were stationed there until 2nd ID's relocation in August 2005. Various 2nd ID units operated out of the camp from 1971 through 2005. The camp was home to both 2nd ID's Division Artillery and Aviation units until base realignment handed command of the installation to the 501st Corps Support Group.

== History ==
Camp Stanley began as a tent city in 1954. The first U.S. Army helicopters moved to the camp later that year and aviation units were stationed there until 2nd ID's relocation in August 2005. Various 2nd ID units operated out of the camp from 1971 through 2005. The camp was home to both 2nd ID's Division Artillery and Aviation units until base realignment handed command of the installation to the 501st Corps Support Group.

== Status ==
Camp Stanley was home to the following tenant units and groups: B Troop, 4th Squadron, 7th Cavalry (Air), Charlie Company 2nd Aviation Regiment (AMC), C2AMC, A/38 Field Artillery, 6-37 Field Artillery, Foxtrot Battery(TAB)/26th FA, 304th Signal Battalion (HHC, Bravo, and Charlie Companies), 532nd Military Intelligence Battalion (Bravo Company), 46th Transportation Company 61st Maintenance Company (194th CSSB), 560th Medical Company, Installation Management Command (IMCOM), 602nd Aviation Support Battalion (Support Team), MEDDAC-K Preventive Medicine & Industrial Hygiene, 23rd Chemical Battalion (2ID), 618th Dental Company, 629th Ambulance Company, 560th Medical Company (TMC), Battery F/5th ADA, 55th Military Police Company, Numerous American Civilians, Korean National (KN), Korean Service Guards (KSG), and Korean Service Corps (KSC), 8/8 FA Battalion (2ID), DIV Arty (2ID)..Delta Company 702 (Combat Medics)

Warrior Reception Company (WRC) relocated to Camp Hovey in February 2012, as did the area Combined Issue Facility (CIF).

Camp Stanley provides logistical support to Area I through its 501st SBDE units. The camp maintains its helipads and a refueling station for helicopters in support of 2nd Infantry Division operations, USFK and ROK.

There is a HazMart (recycling and reutilization facility) on the camp.

Camp Stanley is slated to close by the end of 2017 with units leaving in June, in line with the ongoing draw-down and realignment of American forces in South Korea. Units that are not inactivated will relocate North to Camp Casey, or South to Camp Humphreys or Daegu Garrison.

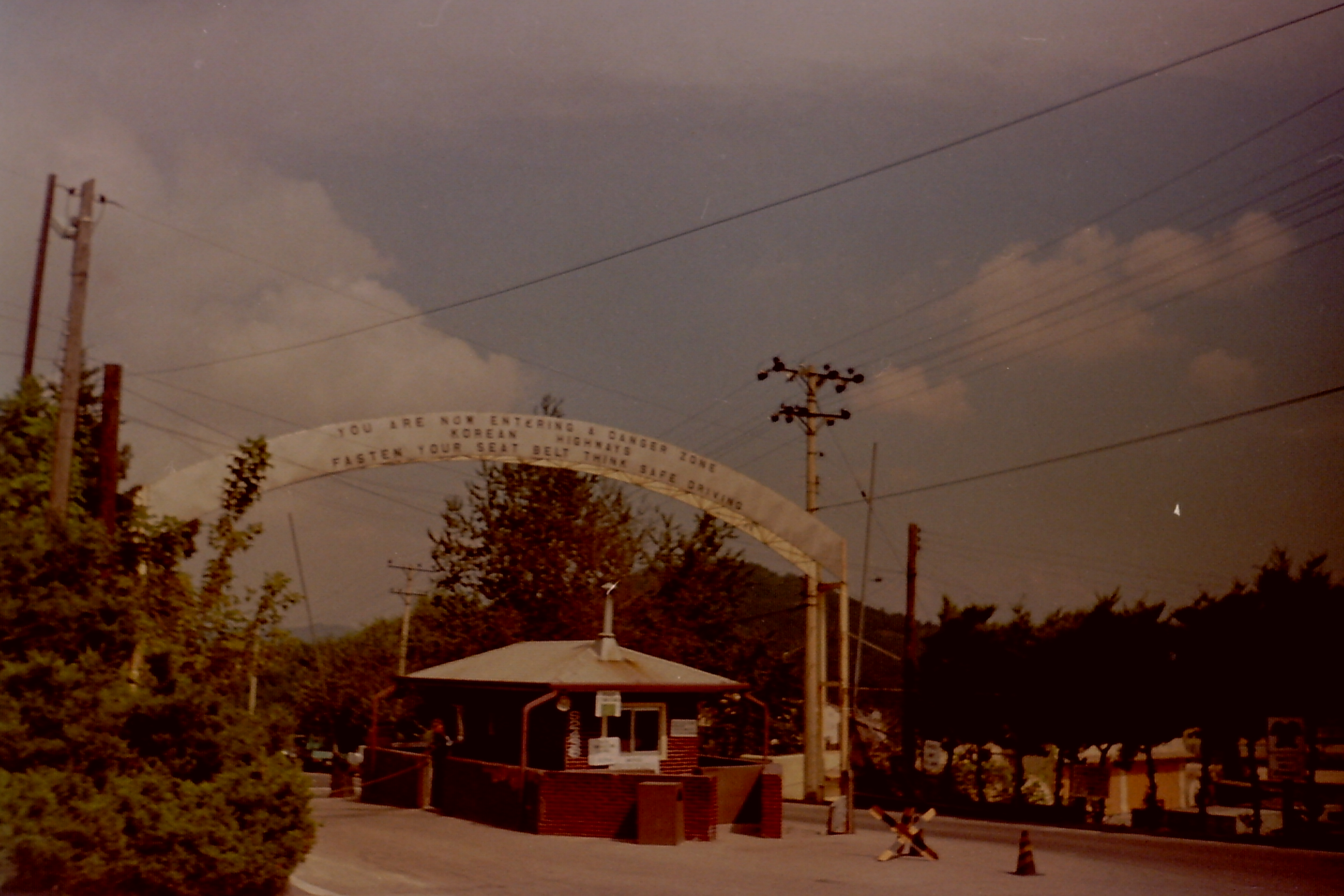
Camp Stanley - 1996 - Side Gate

== Facilities ==
=== Health care ===
- Dental Clinic
- Troop Medical Clinic
- Preventive Medicine & Industrial Hygiene

=== MWR ===
- Community Activity Center (Closed)
- Library
- Bowling Center
- Indoor Swimming Pool (Closed)
- Tennis/Basketball Courts
- Softball/Baseball Field
- Gymnasium
- Fitness Center
- Bar and Restaurant, Reggies (Closed)

=== AAFES facilities ===
- Post Exchange
- LG UPlus (Mobile, Internet, Cable TV service)
- Commissary
- Anthony's Pizza
- Tailor Shop
- Souvenir Shop
- Coin and Plaque Shop
- Electronics Shop
- Internet and cellular phone shop
- Pizza Delivery (Bowling Alley and Anthony's)
- Barber / Beauty Salon
- KATUSA Snack Bar (Korean food)

== Noteworthy events ==
In July 2009 a South Korean court convicted six Korean nationals on charges of stealing $8 million in merchandise from the camp's Army and Air Force Exchange Service (AAFES) stores between October 2005 and September 2006. Five of those were former employees of AAFES at the base.

Camp Stanley is officially closed and is no longer inhabited by the United States, RoK, or any other military entity.

== See also ==
- List of United States Army installations in South Korea
