= Camp Jackson (Korea) =

US Army base near Uijeongbu, South Korea

Coordinates: 37°41′53″N 127°02′38″E

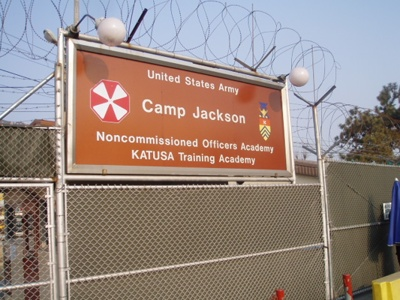
Camp Jackson main gate sign

Camp Jackson was a United States Army camp south of Camp Red Cloud (in Uijeongbu) and 20 miles south of the DMZ at the throat of the Uijeongbu Corridor, on the National Highway 3 now in the far northern Dobong-gu suburb of Seoul. It was one of the smallest US military installations in South Korea. The camp was named after Private First Class George W. Jackson who was awarded the Silver Star during the Korean War.

The US Eighth Army had an NCO Academy at Camp Jackson.

The KATUSA Training Academy operated a 19-day course which involves subjects essential to function with the American units, such as nuclear, biological and chemical training, how to put on and work in a protective mask, the M16 rifle, first aid, land navigation, military customs courtesies, and English classes. Instructors at KTA are volunteers from the ranks of the US Army, ROK Army, and KATUSA.

Personnel stationed at Camp Jackson were eligible for Hardship Pay.

Camp Jackson was handed back over to the South Korean government as part of the USFK transformation plan by 2016.

== Photos ==
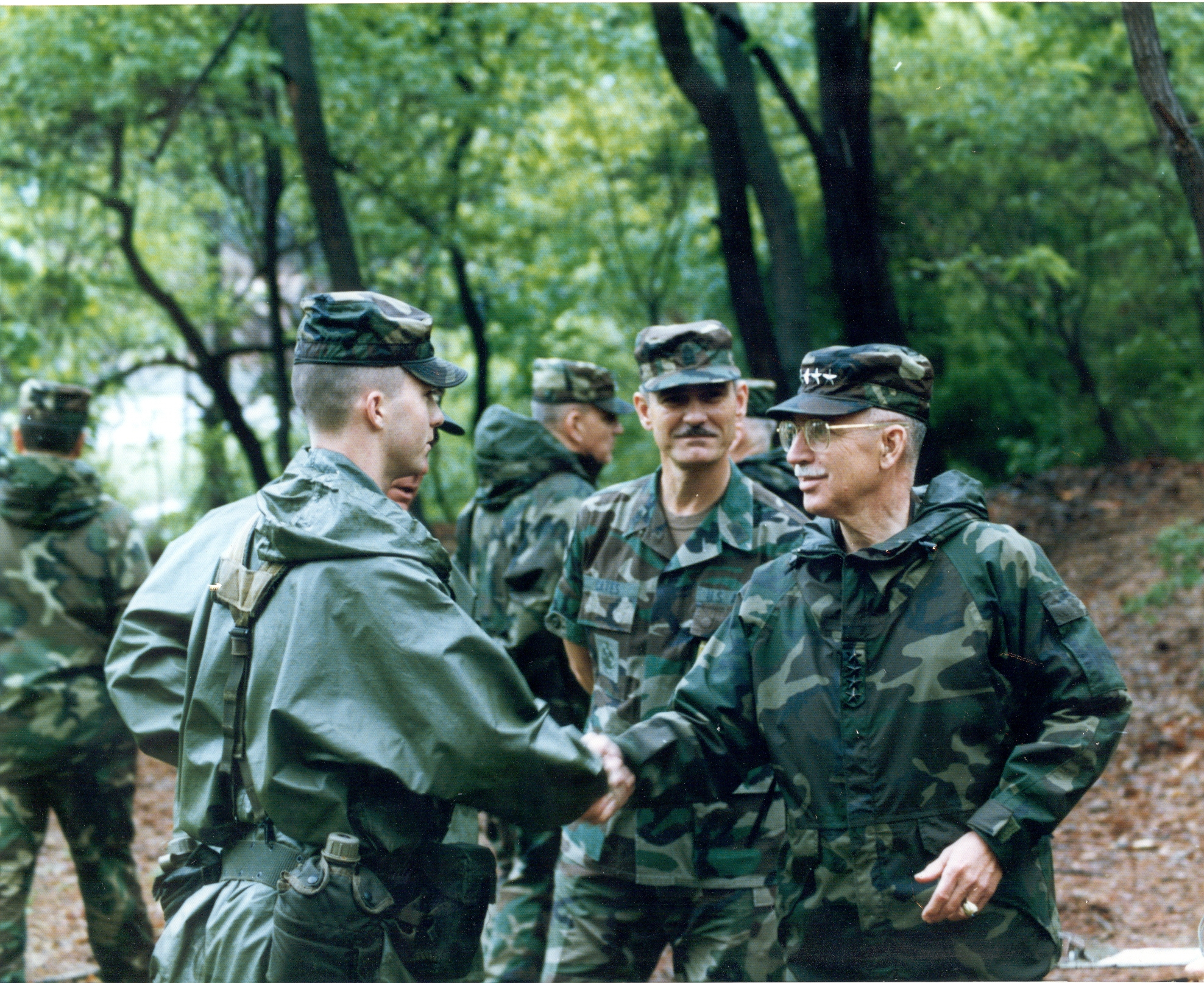
General Frederick M. Franks Jr., Commander of United States Army Training and Doctrine Command tours Camp Jackson. Pictured shaking hands with NCO Academy trainee Corporal Daniel L. Dow, at 2nd Infantry Division (United States) (South Korea) NCO Academy on 31 May 1993.

== See also ==
- List of United States Army installations in South Korea
- Korean Demilitarized Zone (DMZ)
