= Camp Red Cloud =

Former US Army camp in South Korea

Coordinates: 37°45′07″N 127°01′40″E

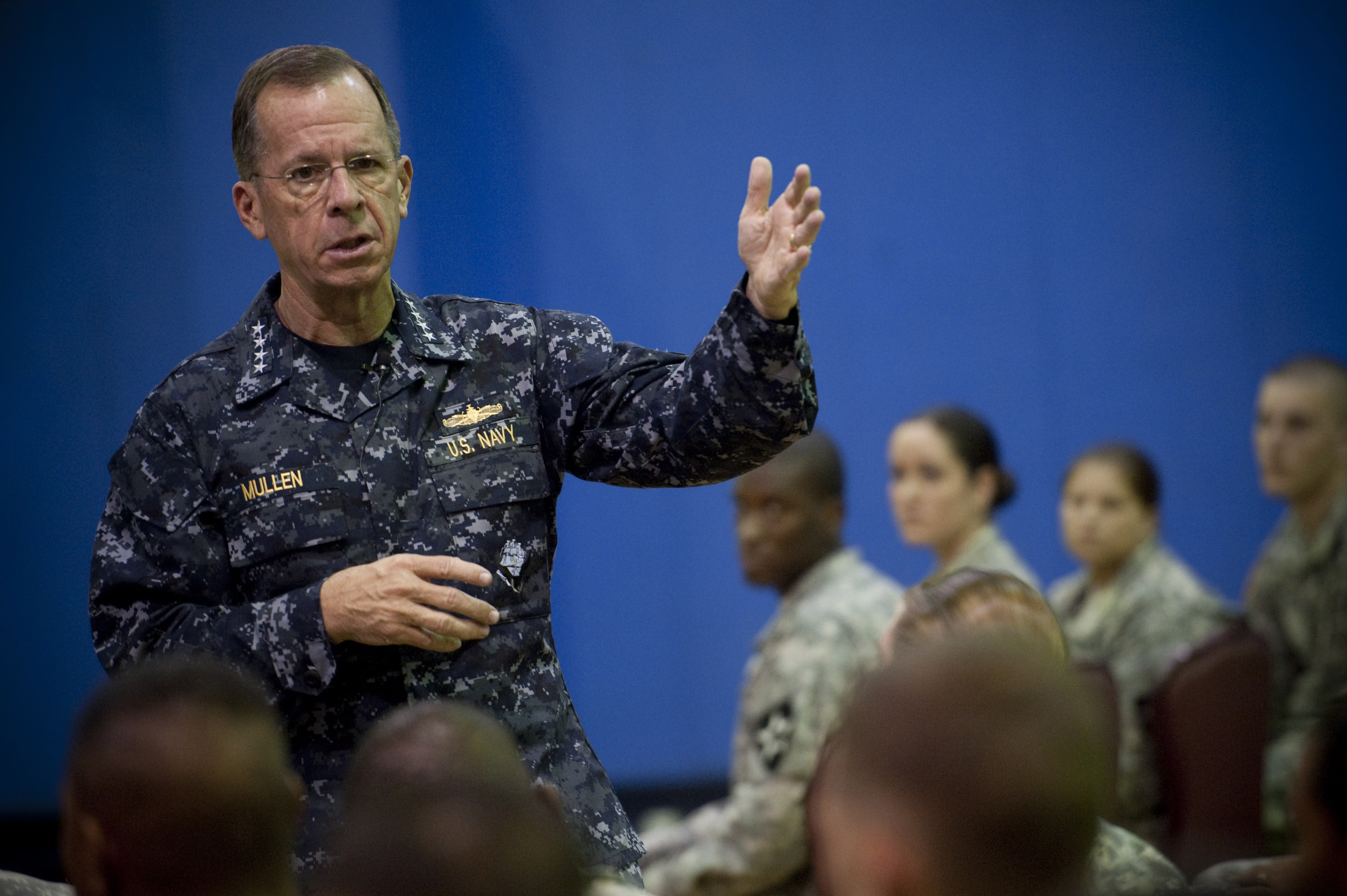
Chairman of the Joint Chiefs of Staff Adm. Mike Mullen, U.S. Navy, answers questions during an all hands call with soldiers assigned to the 2nd Infantry Division stationed at Camp Red Cloud in 2010

Camp Red Cloud (CRC, Korean: 캠프 레드 클라우드) was a United States Army camp located in the city of Uijeongbu, between Seoul and the Korean Demilitarized Zone (DMZ). CRC was transferred to the South Korean government in February 2022. The installation was renamed after Medal of Honor recipient Corporal Mitchell Red Cloud Jr. on Armed Forces Day, May 18, 1957 from its earlier name of Camp Jackson (which continues as the name of another post just south of CRC).

The tenant units moved to Camp Humphreys in South Korea during 2018.

== Geography ==
Camp Red Cloud covered over 164 acres (0.66 km^{2}) of land in the northwestern edge of the city of Uijeongbu and served as the Headquarters of 2nd Infantry Division (United States).

Camp Red Cloud was the home of several military units including,:

- 55th MP Company
- United States Air Force Tactical Air Control Party (TACP) unit (604th Air Support Operations Squadron)
- U.S. Army explosive ordnance disposal detachment (late 1990s)
- 501st Corps Support Group (CSG)
- Division command staff
- Hospital staff
- Finance staff
- ROK/KATUSA headquarters

== History ==
D-company, HQ-company, and the 122d Signal Battalion were retired in 2005, and the remaining soldiers formed the new Division Special Troops Battalion(STB), now the largest unit on the camp. It is a support battalion made up of A CO, and B CO (signal companies), HHSC (division headquarters company), and 2X (division administrative company). The 2nd Infantry Division Band was inactivated in August 2015.

In the summer of 1998, the region of South Korea where CRC lies was subjected to severe rains that caused deadly flooding and damage to CRC. Three US service members lost their lives during the floods, as well as many Korean nationals and domestic livestock who perished in the flood waters. A large portion of the hill behind CRC washed away. A massive mudslide devastated the southern half of CRC. For weeks, Camp Red Cloud went without a main PX as it was destroyed by the floods. Several barracks (officer quarters) were leveled in the destruction along with the golf Pro Shop located adjacent to the helipad. The 2ID museum also suffered severe damage in the torrent of mud and water.

Camp Red Cloud has been the site of various protests and demonstrations against the US presence in Korea. The largest such protest was in 2002 when Korean protesters tossed Molotov cocktails and cut holes in the fences around the post. This demonstration was in reaction to the Yangju highway incident in which a US military vehicle had run over two school girls. Fences around the post have since been replaced with concrete walls.

Camp Red Cloud conducted a deactivation ceremony in June 2018, one of the first steps for turning the area over to the Republic of Korea Army, with Freeman Hall, the 2nd Infantry Division headquarters building, officially closing in October of that year. The final transfer will happen sometime in 2019. The 2nd Infantry Division historical museum is scheduled to be moved to area III on Camp Humphreys.

== Proposed future uses ==
Shin Sang-ho, a South Korean ceramist and Chairman of the Camp Red Cloud Design Cluster Creation Working Group, has been working with government officials to convert the area. The proposal is for a multi-use cultural space for galleries, artist residences, a school for design and art research, and location to host art fairs.

== See also ==
- List of United States Army installations in South Korea
