= Jacob Schrot =

German civil servant (born 1990)

Chief of Staff to the Chancellor
- In office 6 May 2025 – 5 January 2026
- Chancellor: Friedrich Merz
- Preceded by: Wolfgang Schmidt
- Succeeded by: Philipp Birkenmaier

Personal details
- Born: 30 June 1990 (age 35) Brandenburg an der Havel
- Party: Christian Democratic Union

Jacob Schrot (born 30 June 1990 in Brandenburg an der Havel) is a German civil servant who served as chief of staff to chancellor Friedrich Merz from 2025 to 2026. He concurrently served as chief of staff of the Federal Security Council from 2025 to 2026. From 2022 to 2025, he served as chief of staff to Merz as leader of the opposition. During the 2021 federal election, he served as advisor to Armin Laschet. He previously served as chief of staff to Stephan Harbarth and worked for Jan Hecker. While staying in the United States, he worked for Eliot Engel and the German Marshall Fund, and served as president of the Federation of German-American Clubs. In 2009, he won the political talent show Ich kann Kanzler!, broadcast on ZDF.
