= Allied-occupied Germany =

Post-World War II occupation of Germany

Occupation of Germany
- 1945–1949
- Merchant flag

- Map of Germany from 1947 under Allied occupation: Saar Protectorate (de facto not a part of Germany); French occupation zone; British occupation zone (Note: The two American exclaves in the British sector is the state of Bremen.); American occupation zone; Soviet occupation zone (Note: The quadripartite area shown within the Soviet zone is Berlin.)

- The four sectors and exclaves of Berlin
- Status: Military occupation
- Common languages: German (majority); English; French; Russian
- History
  - Surrender of German armed forces: 8 May 1945
  - Allied Control Council: 5 June 1945
  - Saar Protectorate (Note: Became a state of the Federal Republic of Germany (West Germany) by joining it on 1 January 1957, not recognized by all four Allied powers, the separation was opposed by the Soviet Union.): 17 December 1947
  - West Germany: 23 May 1949
  - East Germany (Note: Reunited Germany by joining the Federal Republic of Germany on 3 October 1990.): 7 October 1949
Preceded by	Succeeded by
Nazi Germany	West Germany; East Germany

The entirety of Nazi Germany was occupied and administered by the Allies of World War II, from the Berlin Declaration on 5 June 1945 to the establishment of West Germany on 23 May 1949. Nazi Germany was stripped of its sovereignty and its government was entirely dissolved. After Germany formally surrendered on Tuesday, 8 May 1945, the four countries representing the Allies (the United States, United Kingdom, Soviet Union, and France) asserted joint authority and sovereignty through the Allied Control Council (ACC).

Germany after the war was a devastated country – roughly 80 percent of its infrastructure was in need of repair or reconstruction – which helped the idea that Germany was entering a new phase of history ("zero hour"). At first, Allied-occupied Germany was defined as all territories of Germany before the 1938 Nazi annexation of Austria. The Potsdam Agreement on 2 August 1945 defined the new eastern German border by giving Poland and the Soviet Union all regions of Germany east of the Oder–Neisse line (eastern parts of Pomerania, Neumark, Posen-West Prussia, East-Prussia and most of Silesia) and divided the remaining "Germany as a whole" into four occupation zones, each administered by one of the Allies.

All territories annexed by Germany before the war from Austria and Czechoslovakia were returned to these countries. The Memel Territory, annexed by Germany from Lithuania before the war, was annexed by the Soviet Union in 1945 and transferred to the Lithuanian Soviet Socialist Republic. All territories annexed by Germany during the war from Belgium, France, Italy, Luxembourg, Poland, the Soviet Union and Yugoslavia were returned to their respective countries. Deviating from the occupation zones planned according to the London Protocol in 1944, at Potsdam, the United States, United Kingdom and the Soviet Union approved the detachment from Germany of the territories east of the Oder–Neisse line, with the exact line of the boundary to be determined in a final German peace treaty. This treaty was expected to confirm the shifting westward of Poland's borders, as the United Kingdom and United States committed themselves to support the permanent incorporation of eastern Germany into Poland and the Soviet Union. From March 1945 to July 1945, these former eastern territories of Germany had been administered under Soviet military occupation authorities, but following the Potsdam Agreement they were handed over to Soviet and Polish civilian administrations and ceased to constitute part of Allied-occupied Germany.

In the closing weeks of fighting in Europe, United States forces had pushed beyond the agreed boundaries for the future zones of occupation, in some places by as much as 320 km (200 miles). The so-called line of contact between Soviet and U.S. forces at the end of hostilities, mostly lying eastward of the July 1945-established inner German border, was temporary. After two months during which they held areas that had been assigned to the Soviet zone, U.S. forces withdrew in the first days of July 1945. Some have concluded that this was a crucial move which persuaded the Soviet Union to allow American, British and French forces into their designated sectors in Berlin, which occurred at roughly the same time; the need for intelligence gathering (Operation Paperclip) may also have been a factor. After the Soviet withdrawal from the Allied Control Council on 20 March 1948, the split had led to the 1949 establishment of two new German states, the Federal Republic of Germany (FRG, West Germany) and the German Democratic Republic (GDR, East Germany).

== Occupation zones ==
=== American zone ===
The American zone in Southern Germany consisted of Bavaria (without the Rhine Palatinate Region and the Lindau District, both part of the French zone) and Hesse (without Rhenish Hesse and Montabaur Region, both part of the French zone) with a new capital in Wiesbaden, and of northern parts of Württemberg and Baden. Those formed Württemberg-Baden and became northern portions of the present-day German state of Baden-Württemberg founded in 1952.

The ports of Bremen (on the lower Weser River) and Bremerhaven (at the Weser estuary of the North Sea) were also placed under U.S. control because of the U.S. request to have certain toeholds in Northern Germany.

The headquarters of the American military government was the former IG Farben Building in Frankfurt am Main.

=== British zone ===
By May 1945 the British and Canadian Armies had liberated the Netherlands and had conquered Northern Germany. The Canadian forces went home following the German surrender, leaving Northern Germany to be occupied by the British.

The British Army of the Rhine was formed on 25 August 1945 from the British Liberation Army.

In July the British withdrew from Mecklenburg's capital Schwerin which they had taken over from the Americans a few weeks before, as it had previously been agreed to be occupied by the Soviet Army. The Control Commission for Germany (British Element) (CCG/BE) ceded more slices of its area of occupation to the Soviet Union – specifically the Amt Neuhaus of Hanover and some exclaves and fringes of Brunswick, for example the County of Blankenburg, and exchanged some villages between British Holstein and Soviet Mecklenburg under the Barber-Lyashchenko Agreement.

Within the British zone of occupation, the CCG/BE re-established the city of Hamburg as a German state, but with borders that had been drawn by the Nazi government in 1937. The British also created the new German states of:

- Schleswig-Holstein – emerging in 1946 from the Prussian Province of Schleswig-Holstein;
- Lower Saxony – the merger of Brunswick, Oldenburg, and Schaumburg-Lippe with the state of Hanover in 1946; and
- North Rhine-Westphalia – the merger of Lippe with the Prussian provinces of the Rhineland (northern part) and Westphalia – during 1946–47.

Also in 1947, the American zone of occupation being inland had no port facilities – thus the Free Hanseatic City of Bremen and Bremerhaven became exclaves within the British zone.

The British headquarters were originally based in Bad Oeynhausen from 1946, but in 1954 it was moved to Mönchengladbach where it was known as JHQ Rheindahlen.

Another special feature of the British zone was the enclave of Bonn. It was created in July 1949 and was not under British or any other allied control. Instead it was under the control of the Allied High Commission. In June 1950, Ivone Kirkpatrick became the British High Commissioner for Germany. Kirkpatrick carried immense responsibility particularly with respect to the negotiation of the Bonn–Paris conventions during 1951–1952, which terminated the occupation and prepared the way for the rearmament of West Germany.

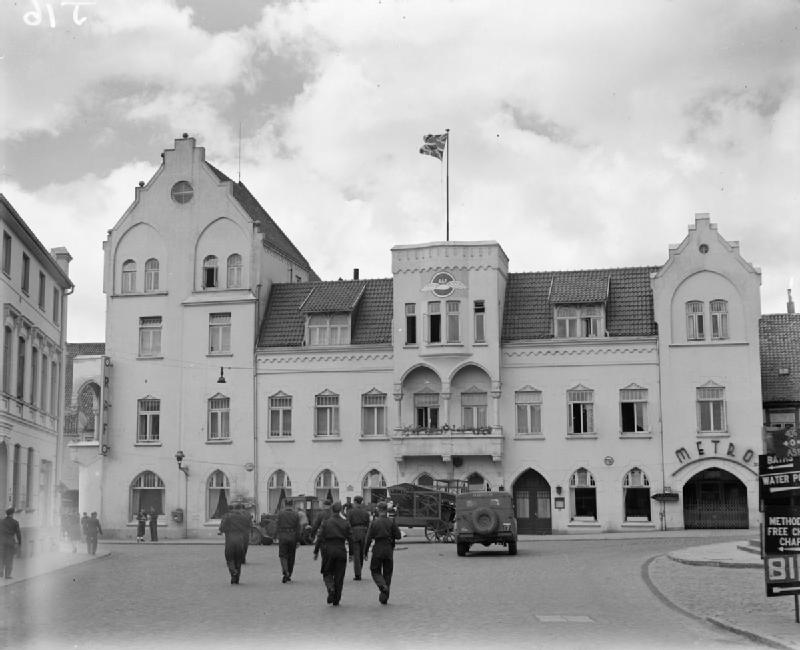
Royal Air Force's Malcolm Club in Schleswig, formerly the Stadt Hamburg Hotel in late 1945.

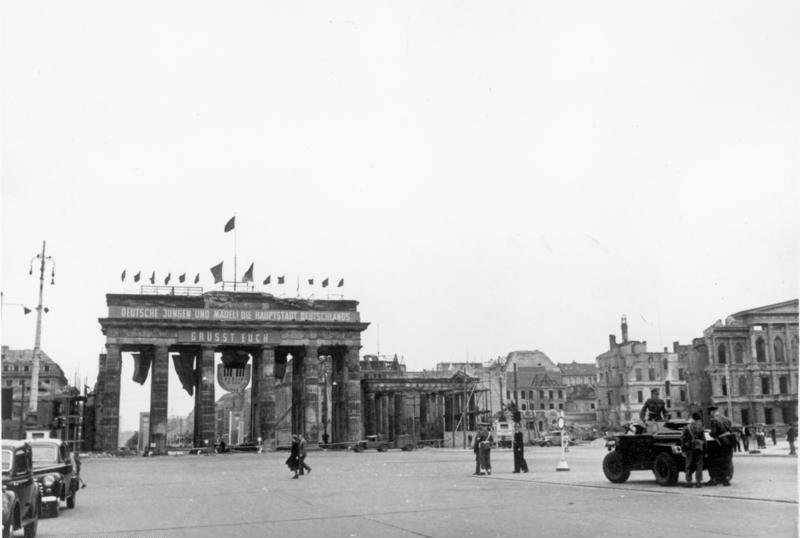
British armored car, at the Brandenburg Gate in Berlin, 1950.

==== Belgian, Polish and Norwegian zones ====
Army units from other countries were stationed within the British occupation zone.

- The Belgians were allocated a territory which was garrisoned by their troops. The zone formed a 200 kilometres (120 mi) strip from the Belgian-German border at the south of the British zone, and included the important cities of Cologne and Aachen. The Belgian army of occupation in Germany (known as the Belgian Forces in Germany from 1951) became autonomous in 1946 under the command, initially, of Jean-Baptiste Piron. Belgian soldiers remained in Germany until 31 December 2005.
  Belgian occupation sub-zone of Germany
- Polish units mainly from 1st Armoured Division were stationed in the northern area of the district of Emsland as well as in the areas of Oldenburg and Leer. This region bordered the Netherlands and covered an area of 6,500 km^{2}, and was originally intended to serve as a collection and dispersal territory for the millions of Polish displaced persons in Germany and Western Europe after the war. Early British proposals for this to form the basis of a formal Polish zone of occupation, were however, soon abandoned due to Soviet opposition. The zone had a large camp constructed largely for displaced persons and was administered by the Polish government in exile. The administrative centre of the Polish occupation zone was the city of Haren the German population of which was temporarily removed. The city was renamed Maczków (after Stanisław Maczek) from 1945 to 1947. Once the British recognised the pro-Soviet government in Poland, and withdrew recognition from the London-based Polish government in exile, the Emsland zone became more of an embarrassment. Polish units within the British Army were demobilised in June 1947. The expelled German populations were allowed to return and the last Polish residents left in 1948.
- In 1946, the Norwegian Brigade Group in Germany had 4,000 soldiers in Hanover; amongst whom was future Chancellor Willy Brandt (then a Norwegian citizen) as press attaché.
- In 1947 (during summer), a Danish Brigade in Germany of 4,000 men, under British command, occupied Oldenburg, after an agreement, signed at Copenhagen in April 1947, between Denmark and United Kingdom. A Danish Occupation Force was formally established on 7 October 1949. The headquarters was in the town of Jever, in East Friesland. However, it was decided to move the brigade to Itzehoe in October 1949, naming itself as Tysklandsbrigaden. It remained stationed at Itzehoe, under the name of The Danish Command in Germany, until 1958.
- The London conference of 23 April 1949, during the Six-Power Conference, gave to the Netherlands some less far-reaching border modifications, after the failure of the Bakker-Schut Plan. So, at 12 noon that day, Dutch troops moved to occupy an area of 69 km^{2} (17,000 acres), whose most relevant parts were Elten (near Emmerich am Rhein) and Selfkant. Many other small border corrections were made, mostly in the vicinity of Arnhem and Dinxperlo, which also were part of this small Dutch sub-zone of occupation.

=== French zone ===
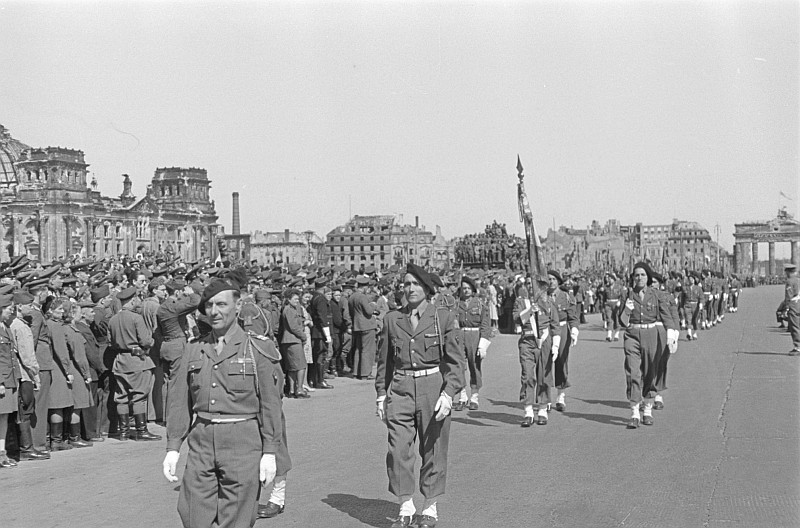
French forces in front of the Brandenburg Gate in Berlin, 1946

The French Republic was at first not granted an occupation zone in Germany, but the British and American governments later agreed to cede some western parts of their zones of occupation to the French Army. In April and May 1945, the French 1st Army had captured Karlsruhe and Stuttgart, and conquered a territory extending to Hitler's Eagle's Nest and the westernmost part of Austria. In July, the French relinquished Stuttgart to the Americans, and in exchange were given control over cities west of the Rhine such as Mainz and Koblenz. All this resulted in two barely contiguous areas of Germany along the French border which met at just a single point along the River Rhine. Three German states (Land) were established: Rheinland Pfalz in the north and west and on the other hand Württemberg-Hohenzollern and South Baden, who later formed Baden-Württemberg together with Württemberg-Baden of the American zone.

The French zone of occupation included the Saargebiet, which was disentangled from it on 16 February 1946. By 18 December 1946 customs controls were established between the Saar area and Allied-occupied Germany. The French zone ceded further areas adjacent to the Saar (in mid-1946, early 1947, and early 1949). Included in the French zone was the town of Büsingen am Hochrhein, a German exclave separated from the rest of the country by a narrow strip of neutral Swiss territory. The Swiss government agreed to allow limited numbers of French troops to pass through its territory in order to maintain law and order in Büsingen.

==== Luxembourg zone ====
From November 1945, Luxembourg was allocated a zone within the French sector. The Luxembourg 2nd Infantry Battalion was garrisoned in Bitburg and the 1st Battalion was sent to Saarburg. The final Luxembourg forces in Germany, in Bitburg, left in 1955.

=== Soviet zone ===
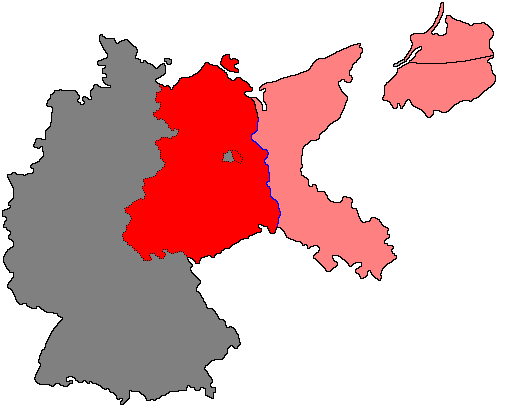
Pink: portions of Weimar Germany east of the Oder–Neisse line attached to Poland (except for northerly East Prussia and the adjoining Memel Territory, not shown here, which were joined directly to the Soviet Union). Red: the Soviet Occupation zone of Germany.

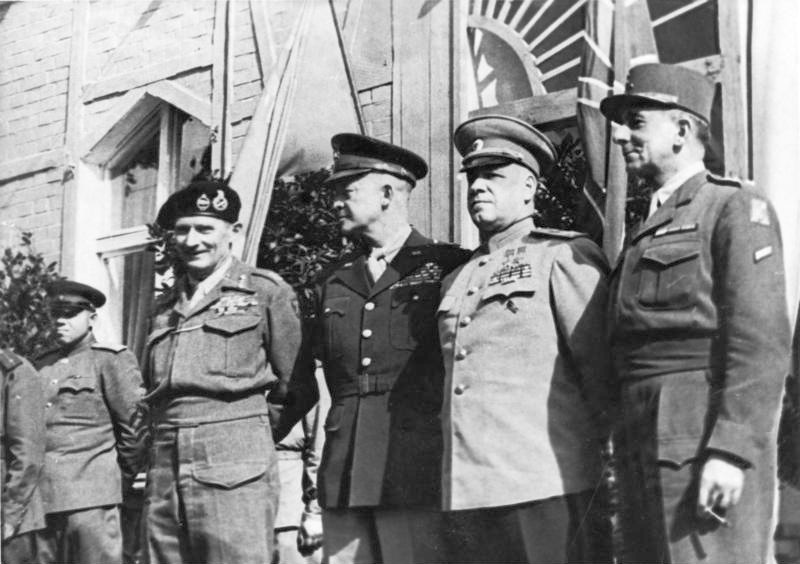
The Supreme Commanders of the Four Powers on 5 June 1945 in Berlin: Bernard Montgomery, Dwight D. Eisenhower, Georgy Zhukov, and Jean de Lattre de Tassigny

The Soviet occupation zone incorporated Thuringia, Saxony, Saxony-Anhalt, Brandenburg and Mecklenburg. The Soviet Military Administration was headquartered in Berlin-Karlshorst, which also came to house the chief rezidentura of Soviet intelligence in Germany.

== Berlin ==
While located wholly within the Soviet zone, because of its symbolic importance as the nation's capital and seat of the former Nazi government, the city of Berlin was jointly occupied by the Allied powers and subdivided into four sectors. All four occupying powers were entitled to privileges throughout Berlin that were not extended to the rest of Germany – this included the Soviet sector of Berlin, which was legally separate from the rest of the Soviet zone.

== Lost territory ==
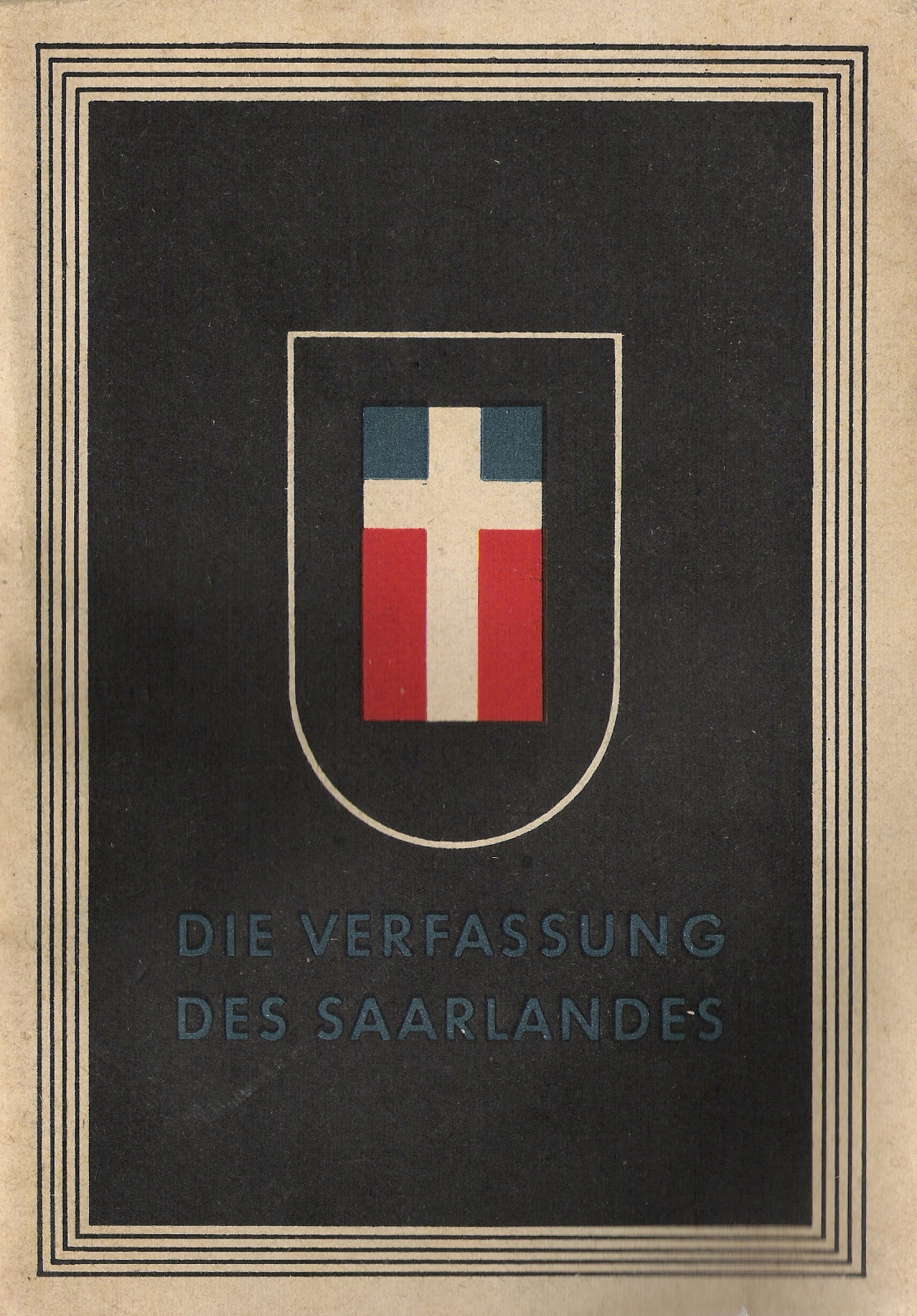
Cover of the 1947 Saar constitution

In 1945 Germany east of the Oder–Neisse line was assigned to Poland by the Potsdam Conference to be "temporarily administered" pending the Final Peace Treaty on Germany between the four Allies and a future German state; eventually (under the September 1990 Peace Treaty) the northern portion of East Prussia became the Kaliningrad Oblast within the Soviet Union (today Russian Federation). A small area west of the Oder, near Szczecin, also fell to Poland. Most German citizens residing in these areas were subsequently expropriated and expelled. Returning refugees, who had fled from war hostilities, were denied return.

Saarland, an area in the French occupation zone, was separated from Allied-occupied Germany to become a French protectorate with its constitution took effect on 17 December 1947, however the separation was opposed by the Soviet Union and Germans here were not expelled.

== Population ==
In October 1946, the population of the various zones and sectors was as follows:

State, sector, or other territory	Zone	Population
Bavaria	American	8.7 million
Hesse	American	3.97 million
Württemberg-Baden	American	3.6 million
Bremen	American	0.48 million
North Rhine-Westphalia	British	11.7 million
Lower Saxony	British	6.2 million
Schleswig-Holstein	British	2.6 million
Hamburg	British	1.4 million
Rhineland-Palatinate	French	2.7 million
South Baden	French	1.2 million
Württemberg-Hohenzollern	French	1.05 million
Saxony	Soviet	5.5 million
Saxony-Anhalt	Soviet	4.1 million
Thuringia	Soviet	2.9 million
Brandenburg	Soviet	2.5 million
Mecklenburg-Vorpommern	Soviet	2.1 million
Berlin (western sectors)	American, British, French	2.0 million
Berlin (Soviet sector)	Soviet	1.1 million

== Governance and the emergence of two German states ==
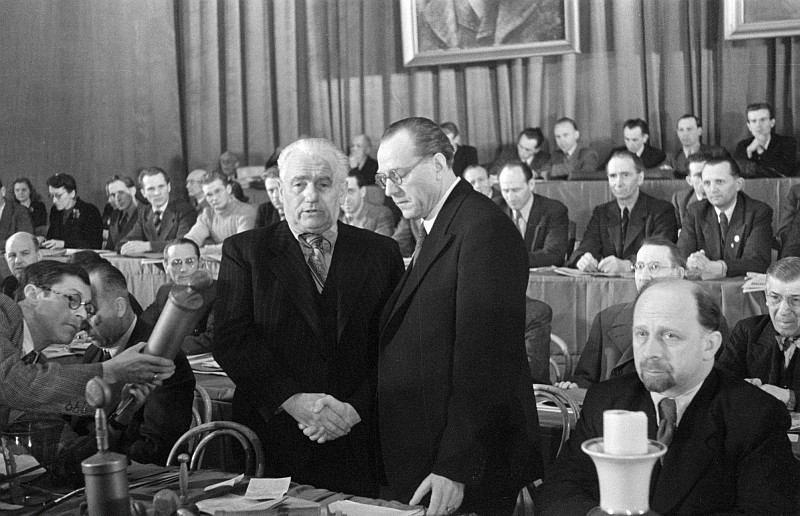
An East German political event on 21 April 1946: Otto Grotewohl (right) and Wilhelm Pieck (left) seal the unification of the 2 communist parties-SPD and KPD with a symbolic handshake. This merger formed the SED, a communist party that would come to dominate the future East German state. Walter Ulbricht is seated in the foreground to the right of Grotewohl. Avraham Pisarek

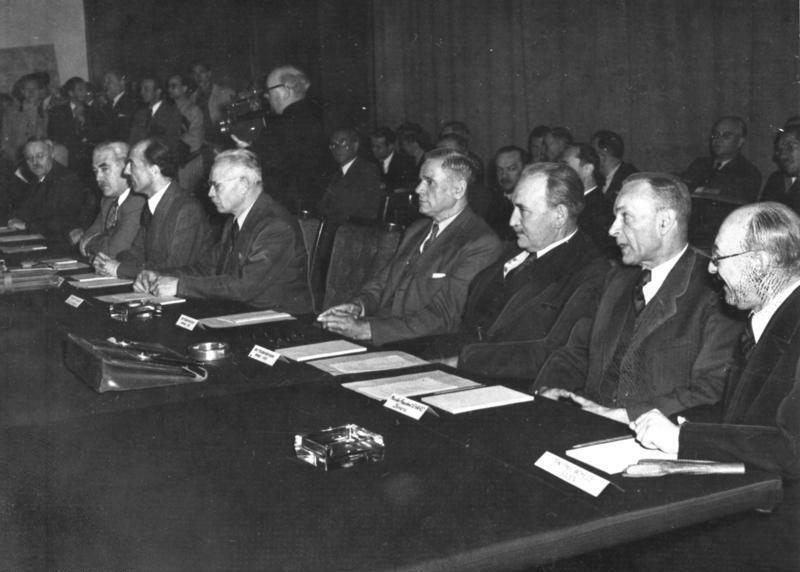
West German mayors and minister presidents receive the British, American, and French occupiers' Frankfurt Documents, which contained recommendations for the establishment of a new state and also formed a working basis for the Basic Law for the Federal Republic of Germany; 1 July 1948

The original Allied plan to govern Germany as a single unit through the Allied Control Council de facto broke down on 20 March 1948 (restored on 3 September 1971) in the context of growing tensions between the Allies, with Britain and the US wishing cooperation, France obstructing any collaboration in order to partition Germany into many independent states, and especially: the Soviet Union unilaterally implementing from early on elements of a Marxist political-economic system (enforced redistribution of land, nationalisation of businesses). Another dispute was the absorption of post-war expellees. While the UK, the US and the Soviet Union had agreed to accept, house and feed about six million expelled German citizens from former eastern Germany and four million expelled and denaturalised Czechoslovaks, Poles, Hungarians and Yugoslavs of German ethnicity in their zones, France generally had not agreed to the expulsions approved by the Potsdam agreement (a decision made without input from France). Therefore, France strictly refused to absorb war refugees who were denied return to their homes in seized eastern German territories or destitute post-war expellees who had been expropriated there, into the French zone, let alone into the separated Saar protectorate. However, the native population, returning after Nazi-imposed removals (e.g., political and Jewish refugees) and war-related relocations (e.g., evacuation from air raids), were allowed to return home in the areas under French control. The other Allies complained that they had to shoulder the burden to feed, house and clothe the expellees who had to leave their belongings behind.

In practice, each of the four occupying powers wielded government authority in their respective zones and carried out different policies toward the population and local and state governments there. A uniform administration of the western zones evolved, known first as the Bizone (the American and British zones merged as of 1 January 1947) and later the Trizone (after inclusion of the French zone). The complete breakdown of east–west allied cooperation and joint administration in Germany became clear with the Soviet imposition of the Berlin Blockade that was enforced from June 1948 to May 1949. The three western zones were merged to form the Federal Republic of Germany (FRG) i.e. West Germany in May 1949, and after that the Soviets followed suit in October 1949 with the establishment of the German Democratic Republic (GDR) i.e. East Germany.

In the west, the occupation continued until 5 May 1955, when the General Treaty (German: Deutschlandvertrag) entered into force. However, upon the creation of the Federal Republic in May 1949, the military governors were replaced by civilian high commissioners, whose powers lay somewhere between those of a governor and those of an ambassador. When the Deutschlandvertrag became law, the occupation ended, the western occupation zones ceased to exist, and the high commissioners were replaced by normal ambassadors. West Germany was also allowed to build a military, and the Bundeswehr, or Federal Defense Force, was established on 12 November 1955.

A similar situation occurred in East Germany. The GDR was founded on 7 October 1949. On 10 October the Soviet Military Administration in Germany was replaced by the Soviet Control Commission, although limited sovereignty was not granted to the GDR government until 11 November 1949. After the death of Joseph Stalin in March 1953, the Soviet Control Commission was replaced with the office of the Soviet High Commissioner on 28 May 1953. This office was abolished (and replaced by an ambassador) and (general) sovereignty was granted to the GDR, when the Soviet Union concluded a state treaty (Staatsvertrag) with the GDR on 20 September 1955. On 1 March 1956, the GDR established a military, the National People's Army (NVA).

Despite the grants of general sovereignty to both German states in 1955, full and unrestricted sovereignty under international law was not enjoyed by any German government until after the reunification of Germany in October 1990. Though West Germany was effectively independent, the western Allies maintained limited legal jurisdiction over 'Germany as a whole' in respect of West Germany and Berlin. At the same time, East Germany progressed from being a satellite state of the Soviet Union to increasing independence of action; while still deferring in matters of security to Soviet authority. The provisions of the Treaty on the Final Settlement with Respect to Germany, also known as the "Two-plus-Four Treaty", granting full sovereign powers to Germany did not become law until 15 March 1991, after all of the participating governments had ratified the treaty. As envisaged by the Treaty, the last occupation troops departed from Germany when the Russian presence was terminated in 1994, although the Belgian Forces in Germany stayed in German territory until the end of 2005.

A 1956 plebiscite ended the French administration of the Saar protectorate, and it joined the Federal Republic as Saarland on 1 January 1957, becoming its tenth state.

The city of Berlin was not part of either state and de jure continued to be under Allied occupation of the four countries until the reunification of Germany in October 1990. For administrative purposes, the three western sectors of Berlin were merged into the entity of West Berlin being de facto part of the FRG. The Soviet sector became known as East Berlin and while not recognised by the Western powers as a part of East Germany, the GDR declared it its capital (Hauptstadt der DDR).

== Occupation policy ==
Allied aims with respect to postwar Germany were first laid out at the Yalta Conference, where Roosevelt, Churchill, and Stalin signed an agreement stating that they intended to: disarm and disband the German armed forces; break up the German General Staff; remove or destroy all German military equipment; eliminate or control German industry that could be used for military production; punish war criminals; exact reparations for damage done by Germany; wipe out the Nazi party and its institutions; remove all Nazi and militarist influences from public life; and take any other measures in Germany as might be necessary to ensure future peace and safety. The consensus among the Allies was that it was necessary to ensure Germany could not cause further world wars, but beyond that their opinion on what Germany's future should look like differed.

=== US occupation policy ===
The US originally considered a punitive approach championed by Roosevelt's Secretary of the Treasury, Henry Morgenthau Jr. (the "Morgenthau Plan"). Under this plan, Germany would have been broken into four autonomous states and not only demilitarized but also deindustrialized to the point of becoming chiefly agrarian. The Morgenthau Plan was opposed by Secretary of State Cordell Hull and War Secretary Henry L. Stimson, and Roosevelt distanced himself from the idea after it was reported on by major American newspapers. Ultimately, US occupation policy came to be determined chiefly by the War Department, with long-term objectives summed up by the four Ds: denazification, democratization, demilitarization, and decentralization (or decartelization).

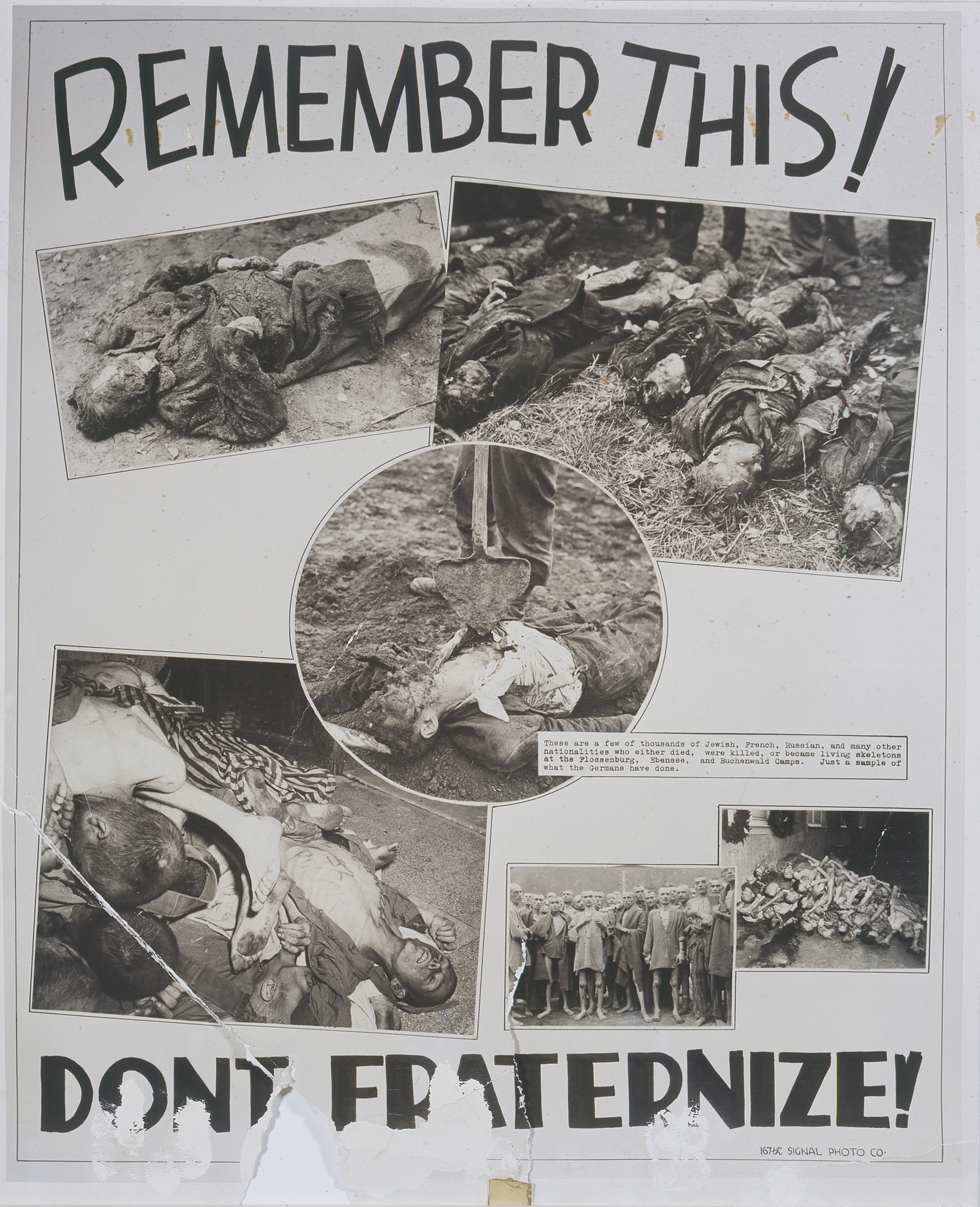
American propaganda poster using images of concentration camp victims to warn against fraternization.

Initially, the US was extremely rigorous in its efforts to prevent fraternization with German civilians. US soldiers were forbidden to shake hands with Germans, visit their homes, play games or sports with them, exchange gifts, take part in social events, or walk in the streets with them. How strictly this policy was applied varied from place to place, but in many places the restrictions were frequently ignored, as a result of which the policy was quickly abandoned. Germans were also prohibited from inhabiting any part of a building in which US soldiers were housed, leading to large numbers of Germans being ejected from their homes at bayonet-point.

Denazification in the American zone included the complete closure of all Nazi German media, after which the US military government began granting licenses to Germans who had not been involved in Nazi propaganda to establish new publications. Newspapers established via this process included Frankfurter Rundschau (August 1945), Der Tagesspiegel (Berlin, September 1945), and Süddeutsche Zeitung (Munich, October 1945). Radio stations were initially operated only by the American Forces Network, whose stations included AFN Munich, AFN Frankfurt, and AFN Stuttgart. In 1946, Rundfunk im amerikanischen Sektor (RIAS), which was supervised by the military government's Information Control Division, began to broadcast from Berlin. Later, these stations were joined by the German-operated Hessischer Rundfunk, Bayerischer Rundfunk, and Süddeutscher Rundfunk.

=== British occupation policy ===
British occupation policy was similar to that of the United States, but with a greater focus on economic problems. The British occupation zone included the Ruhr industrial region, which had experienced the heaviest bombing and therefore faced the greatest shortages of housing and food. Initial British occupation directives were concerned primarily with economic considerations and food supply. However, Germans were also prohibited from inhabiting any part of a building in which British soldiers were housed, leading to large numbers of Germans being ejected from their homes at bayonet-point.

To further the long-term aim of democratization, the British implemented government modeled on the UK system, placing heavy emphasis on local level democracy. The goal was to create a British-style administration with employees who viewed themselves as public servants, on the basis that this would help to reeducate Germans to democratic modes of thought. To that end the British introduced new local government structures, including a nonpolitical position similar to the English town clerk ("city director") that replaced the office of mayor.

In general, the British believed strongly in reeducation as a means to achieve democracy, which led them to prioritize the reestablishment of schooling and university education in their zone.

=== French occupation policy ===
The French were less concerned with improving Germany's moral and civic character, focusing instead on ensuring France's future security and utilizing the resources of their occupation zone to facilitate economic recovery within France itself. Since one of their key goals was to ensure that Germany would never again be in a position to threaten France, the French were strongly opposed to a unified approach to occupation, and favored political structures that were as decentralized as possible. Also like the Americans and British, Germans were prohibited from inhabiting any part of a building in which French soldiers were housed, leading to large numbers of Germans being ejected from their homes at bayonet-point.

On the economic front, the French seized the opportunity to extract coal and steel resources from the Saar region, fusing it with France in a customs and currency union and encouraging the development of export industries. As a result, the French managed to extract a surplus from their occupation zone, and prevented it from becoming a financial liability the way the British and American zones were to their respective occupying powers.

=== Soviet occupation policy ===
Soviet aims in Germany were similar to those of the French, with the primary goals being to prevent future aggression by Germany and to extract reparations.

Political activity in the Soviet occupation zone was overseen by the Soviet Military Administration (SMAD), which maintained close control over the Germans and allowed little room for independent action on the part of local German officials. Key posts in local administration, particularly those dealing with security members, were given to members of the Communist party.

Soviet occupation authorities also executed a rigorous program of land reform, expropriating large landed estates and imposing direct control over much of the economic activity in their zone. Germans were prohibited from inhabiting any building expropriated by the Soviets, leading to large numbers of Germans being ejected from their homes at gunpoint. Some with ties to the Nazi regime were summarily executed; while others were imprisoned at the former Buchenwald concentration camp, known during the Soviet occupation as NKVD special camp No. 2. The Soviets also closed major banks and insurance companies in July 1945, and seized property formerly belonging to the German state, Wehrmacht, Nazi party, and Nazi organizations.

The Soviets used suspicion of supposed Werwolf activity to tighten police control, draw up secret NKVD arrest lists, conduct summary trials and executions and secure forced labor for deportation to the gulags in the Soviet Union.

== Conditions in the occupation zones ==
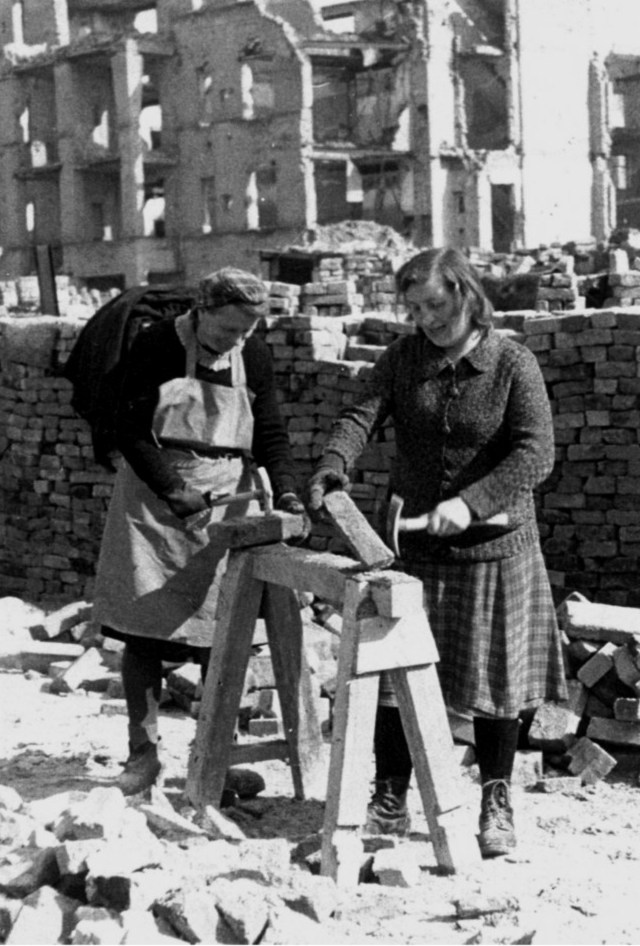
Trümmerfrauen at work, Berlin

The food situation in occupied Germany was initially very dire. By the spring of 1946 the official ration in the American zone was no more than 1,275 calories (5,330 kJ) per day, with some areas probably receiving as little as 700 calories (2,900 kJ) per day. In the British zone the food situation was dire, as found during a visit by the British (and Jewish) publisher Victor Gollancz in October and November 1946. In Düsseldorf the normal 28-day allocation should have been 1,548 calories (6,480 kJ) including 10 kilograms (22 lb) of bread, but as there was limited grain the bread ration was only 8.5 kilograms (19 lb). However, as there was only sufficient bread for about 50% of this "called up" ration, the total deficiency was about 50%, not 15% as stated in a ministerial reply in the British Parliament on 11 December. So only about 770 calories (3,200 kJ) would have been supplied, and he said the German winter ration would be 1,000 calories (4,200 kJ) as the recent increase was "largely mythical". His book includes photos taken on the visit and critical letters and newspaper articles by him published in several British newspapers; The Times, the Daily Herald, the Manchester Guardian, etc.

Some occupation soldiers took advantage of the desperate food situation by exploiting their ample supply of food and cigarettes (the currency of the black market) to get to the local German girls as what became known as frau bait (The New York Times, 25 June 1945). Some soldiers still felt the girls were the enemy, but used them for sex nevertheless.

The often destitute mothers of the resulting children usually received no child support. In the earliest stages of the occupation, U.S. soldiers were not allowed to pay maintenance for a child they admitted having fathered, since to do so was considered "aiding the enemy". Marriages between white U.S. soldiers and Austrian women were not permitted until January 1946, and with German women until December 1946.

The children of African-American soldiers, commonly called Negermischlinge ("Negro half-breeds"), comprising about three percent of the total number of children fathered by GIs, were particularly disadvantaged because of their inability to conceal the foreign identity of their fathers. For many white U.S. soldiers of this era, miscegenation even with an "enemy" white population was regarded as an intolerable outrage. African-American soldiers were therefore reluctant to admit to fathering such children since this would invite reprisals and even accusations of rape, a crime which was much more aggressively prosecuted by military authorities against African-Americans compared with Caucasian soldiers, much more likely to result in a conviction by court-martial (in part because a German woman was both less likely to acknowledge consensual sexual relations with an African-American and more likely to be believed if she alleged rape against an African-American) and which carried a potential death sentence. Even in the rare cases where an African-American soldier was willing to take responsibility for fathering a child, until 1948 the U.S. Army prohibited interracial marriages. The mothers of the children would often face particularly harsh ostracism.

Between 1950 and 1955, the Allied High Commission for Germany prohibited "proceedings to establish paternity or liability for maintenance of children." Even after the lifting of the ban West German courts had little power over American soldiers.

While Allied servicemen were ordered to obey local laws while in Germany, soldiers could not be prosecuted by German courts for crimes committed against German citizens except as authorised by the occupation authorities. Invariably, when a soldier was accused of criminal behaviour the occupation authorities preferred to handle the matter within the military justice system. This sometimes led to harsher punishments than would have been available under German law – in particular, U.S. servicemen could be executed if court-martialed and convicted of rape. See United States v. Private First Class John A. Bennett, 7 C.M.A. 97, 21 C.M.R. 223 (1956).

== Insurgency ==
The last Allied war advances into Germany and Allied occupation plans were affected by rumors of the Nazi Werwolf plan for insurgency, but actual insurgent efforts were minimal. Numerous historians, including Antony Beevor and Earl F. Ziemke, Golo Mann, and Richard Bessel, have observed that widespread resistance never really materialized. The threat was nevertheless taken seriously by the Allies, with the Soviets using unfounded suspicions of Werwolf activity as a pretext to tighten police control and secure forced labor.

Perry Biddiscombe, while also characterizing German resistance as minor, argues that they caused tens of millions of dollars of property damage, and estimates the total death toll due to Werwolf actions and the resulting reprisals as 3,000–5,000. Particularly in the initial stages of the occupation, American military authorities are known to have responded harshly to such attacks, including through the application of the death penalty against individuals caught having killed or attacked US soldiers. See: Capital punishment by the United States military.

== Expulsion policy ==
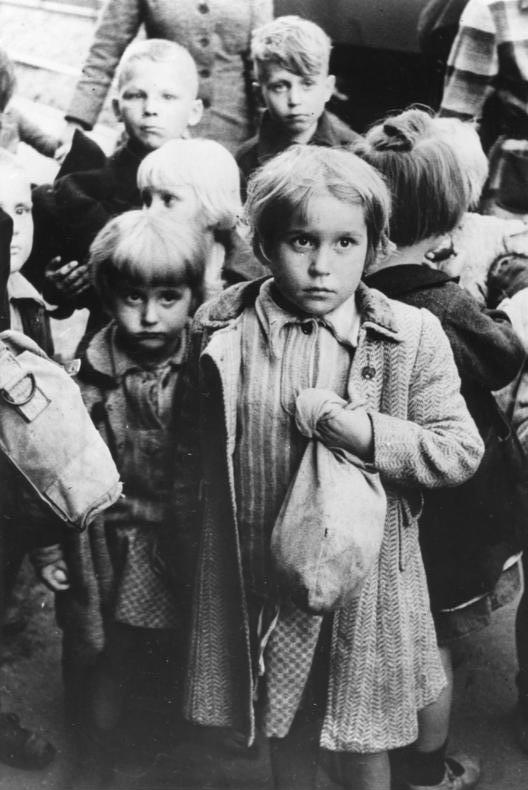
August 1948, German children deported from the eastern areas taken over by Poland arrive in western Germany.

The Potsdam Conference, where the victorious Allies drew up plans for the future of Germany, noted in article XIII of the Potsdam Agreement on 1 August 1945 that "the transfer to Germany of German populations...in Poland, Czechoslovakia and Hungary will have to be undertaken"; "wild expulsion" was already going on.

Hungary, which had been allied with Germany and whose population was opposed to an expulsion of the German minority, tried to resist the transfer. Hungary had to yield to the pressure exerted mainly by the Soviet Union and by the Allied Control Council. Millions of people were expelled from former eastern territories of Germany, Poland, Czechoslovakia, Hungary and elsewhere to the occupation zones of the UK, US, and USSR, which agreed in the Potsdam Agreement to absorb the post-war expellees into their zones. Many remained in refugee camps for a long time. Some Germans remained in the Soviet Union and were used for forced labour for a period of years.

France was not invited to the Potsdam Conference. As a result, it chose to adopt some decisions of the Potsdam Agreements and to dismiss others. France maintained the position that it did not approve post-war expulsions and that therefore it was not responsible to accommodate and nourish the destitute expellees in its zone. While the few war-related refugees who had reached the area to become the French zone before July 1945 were taken care of, the French military government for Germany refused to absorb post-war expellees deported from the East into its zone. In December 1946, the French military government for Germany absorbed into its zone German refugees from Denmark, where 250,000 Germans had found a refuge from the Soviets by sea vessels between February and May 1945. These clearly were war-related refugees from the eastern parts of Germany however, and not post-war expellees.

== See also ==
- Free Territory of Trieste
- Allied-occupied Austria
- German-occupied Europe
- History of Germany since 1945
- Interzonal traffic
- Coalition occupation of France
- Eight-Nation Alliance occupation of China
