= Gary Bautell =

American radio announcer (1942–2022)

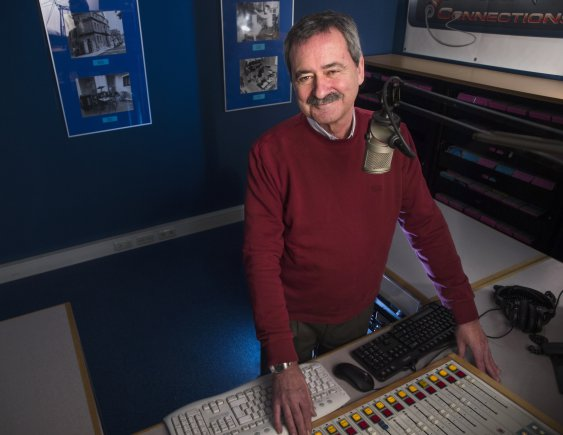
- Bautell in 2012
- Born: Gary Lawrence Bautell; May 31, 1942; Bay City, Michigan, U.S.
- Died: November 22, 2022 (aged 80); Wiesbaden, Germany
- Resting place: Rose Hills Memorial Park
- Education: Michigan State University
- Occupation: Radio announcer
- Years active: 1962–2022
- Employer: American Forces Network
- Title: President of the Federation of German-American Clubs
- Military service
- Branch: United States Army
- Service years: 1962–1965
- Rank: Specialist 5
- Unit: AFN Europe
- Awards: Army Good Conduct Medal

Gary Lawrence Bautell (May 31, 1942 – November 22, 2022) was an AFN Europe radio announcer living in Wiesbaden, Germany. During his more than 60 years at AFN, he introduced postwar Germany to American rock ‘n’ roll and interviewed a slew of national and military leaders. Bautell was once called “the voice of the U.S. military in Europe.” Having worked in Germany for over 50 years, he became involved in promoting German–American relations. Bautell also served as the president of the Federation of German-American Clubs.

== Biography ==
Gary Lawrence Bautell was born on May 31, 1942, in Bay City, Michigan. He joined AFN Europe in 1962 as a private first class in the United States Army. Having previously been stationed in Karlsruhe, Germany, as a combat engineer, Bautell re-enlisted in the Army after working as a DJ in Houghton Lake, Michigan.

Bautell initially worked for AFN Frankfurt at Hoechst Castle as an announcer before transitioning to news broadcasts. In this capacity, he interviewed every German chancellor from Willy Brandt to Angela Merkel, several US Secretaries of Defense, and Presidents Bill Clinton and George W. Bush. Due to the popularity of AFN programs among American military personnel as well as German civilians, his voice was widely recognized in Germany. In addition to Frankfurt, he also worked at Stuttgart and Wiesbaden.

Bautell's work had been recognized as influencing German popular culture, especially though the introduction of elements in American popular culture. For the first few decades of Bautell's broadcasting, German radio played "boring" music, such as folk music. Though broadcasting for American military personnel, Bautell and AFN Europe introduced German listeners to American artists such as Little Richard, Johnny Cash, and Jimi Hendrix. His programs also included swing and jazz music, which had been banned under the Nazis.

== Death ==
Bautell died in Wiesbaden, Germany on November 23, 2022.
