= AFN Bremerhaven =

German American Forces Network affiliate station

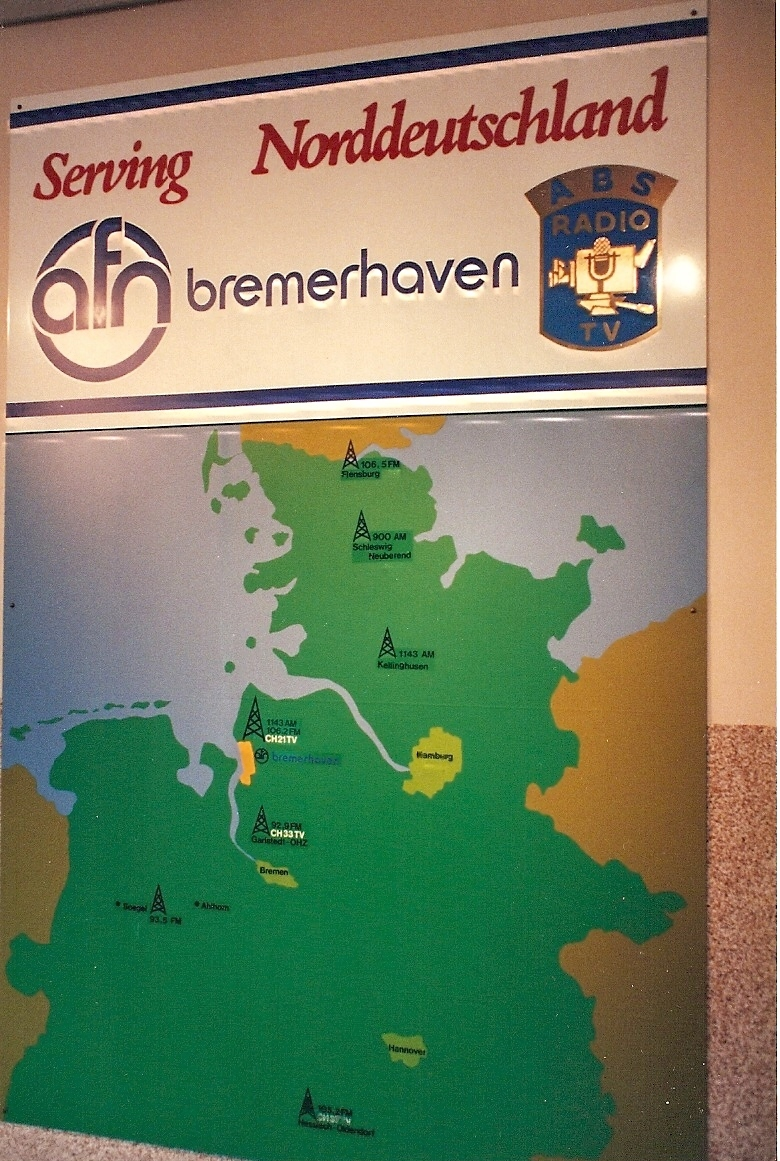
AFN Bremerhaven - The Station's Coverage Area of Northern Germany

AFN Bremerhaven was originally an "Armed Forces Radio and Television Service" (AFRTS) station. (AFRTS, worldwide, is now also known as "American Forces Network" or "AFN"). The Bremerhaven affiliate station was located in northern Germany. At the time, it was part of the "American Forces Network - Europe." AFN Bremerhaven began broadcasting in 1945, originally as AFN Bremen.

The station began operating just after World War II ended in Europe. It was originally established in the north German city of Bremen in allied-occupied Germany as a small AM radio station with an AM repeater transmitter also broadcasting the station's signal in Bremerhaven, Germany, a port city on the Weser River near the entrance to the North Sea located just north of Bremen.

== Military mission ==
The radio station's mission was to provide information and entertainment to members of the American forces who were based in that part of northern Germany. After World War II, the small north German US occupied area was originally known as the "Bremen Enclave", and it was an "American island" located in the portion of the newly formed West Germany that was originally occupied and controlled by British forces, (The British Occupation Zone of West Germany).

== History ==
Just after World War II, the port city of Bremerhaven was one of the major ports from where American forces embarked for return to the United States after fighting in the Second World War; later, the port brought US military personnel, their families, military equipment, as well as food and goods for the rebuilding of Europe to Germany via ships from the US. Many of these shipments were, in part, in support of the Marshall Plan designed to assist and re-build war-torn Europe. Later, in the 1960s, and thereafter, most personnel movement was done via air travel. AFN Bremerhaven entertained the troops and their families based in that area, providing "a touch of home" to them through the station's radio broadcasts and later with the addition of TV broadcasts. The station could also be heard in Lincolnshire and East Yorkshire 24 hours a day. On medium wave radio, AFN Bremen's very first radio broadcast occurred on Saturday, 28 July 1945. In 1949, the station moved from the city of Bremen north to the port city of Bremerhaven and was one of many American units based on Bremerhaven Army Airfield, renamed Carl Schurz Kaserne in 1973, and went from being radio-only "AFN Bremen" to becoming "AFN Bremerhaven" with AM and later with FM radio and TV operations. For nearly 48 years the station broadcast to US personnel; it also entertained many German and other listeners in nearby nations who were also able to hear the station's radio signal from one of its half-dozen repeater transmitters located throughout northern Germany. In addition to AM and FM frequencies in Bremerhaven, the signal was repeated via transmitters located in Garlstedt (Bremen) (FM), Soegel-Ahlhorn (FM), Hessisch Oldendorf (FM), Flensburg (FM), Schleswig-Neuberend (AM), and Kellinghusen (AM). AFN Bremerhaven served US military personnel and their family members assigned to various American military units in and around these transmitter locations.

Earlier in its history, along with US Army and US Air Force units, US Marine and US Navy units were also served by, and members of the US Navy served alongside US Army and US Air Force personnel at AFN Bremerhaven; however, during the last several decades of the station's operation, the affiliate was staffed by just Army and Air Force military personnel and served mostly US Army and US Air Force units throughout northern Germany. However, throughout its entire 48 years of operation, many German employees worked with the US station staff members and were a vital part of AFN Bremerhaven's long and distinguished history. Many of these German AFN members served far longer than any US military member and, in some cases, were part of AFN Bremerhaven for decades.

AFN Bremerhaven was the first AFN television station in Europe to broadcast its programming in color. The U.S. European Edition of "Stars and Stripes" (S&S) reported in its Thursday, August 21, 1975, edition that the AFN-Europe Commander, Lt. Col. Floyd A. McBride, announced that AFN's first color TV broadcast would begin in Bremerhaven on Monday, August 25, 1975. As S&S reported, because Bremerhaven's TV operation was so small, only a "Class C" operation, and, at the time, served only one geographical area (the Bremerhaven housing areas and near-by Carl Schurz Kaserne) with TV programming, it was easy to establish the color TV broadcast operation without extensive expense or expansion.

That next year, S&S reported in its Wednesday, June 23, 1976, edition that "the long-awaited switch to color by AFN-TV could come by the end of the year for viewers in most of West Germany; [those TV viewers in Berlin would have to wait even longer.]" The S&S article continued saying, "the only viewers enjoying color right now are those watching the pilot color TV station in Bremerhaven, which went on the air in 1975."

Beginning in July 1978, the largest single AFN Bremerhaven target audience were members of the US Army's 2nd Armored Division (Forward) based on the newly constructed Lucius D. Clay Kaserne in Garlstedt, Germany. Most of the 2nd Armored Division's family members resided in and around the nearby city of Osterholz-Scharmbeck. All of these Americans were served by the AFN Bremerhaven FM transmitter located in Garlstedt. The division had approximately 3,500 soldiers and another approximately 2,500 family members as well as hundreds of US and German civilian employees. (The division newspaper, "The 2nd AD Dispatch," in its final edition of June 12, 1992, reported that, at its peak, the division had "4,400 soldiers and 4,200 family members.") No doubt, the addition of this unit in 1978 greatly increased the mission of AFN Bremerhaven until 1993 when both the 2nd Armored Division (Forward) and AFN Bremerhaven's deactivations occurred.

== German reunification ==
In 1989, with major changes underway in Europe linked to the fall of the Soviet Union, the end of the Cold War, the German reunification of East and West Germany, and with a major drawdown of US military forces in Germany, the AFN Europe network underwent major changes in its mission. The need for many long-running AFN affiliate radio and TV stations in various German cities to serve American military members and their families diminished and many AFN stations were closed.

== End of station ==
With fewer US military personnel and their family members still stationed in northern Germany, the mission of AFN Bremerhaven gradually diminished, and, in the early 1990s, one-by-one, the six outlying AM and FM repeater radio transmitters were taken off-the-air as the various American military communities closed, and the once-US bases were returned to the host nation. Finally, after 48 years of broadcasting, on 31 March 1993, with only radio service from the Bremerhaven AM and FM transmitters still being provided, AFN Bremerhaven made its last live broadcasts with a local morning show followed by an American Forces Network - Europe, network-wide radio show, and at noon, the AFN Bremerhaven affiliate officially went off the air forever after playing the national anthem of the United States of America by the late Whitney Houston & The Florida Orchestra.

== See also ==
- AFN Berlin
- AFN Frankfurt
- AFN Munich
- AFN Europe
