= AFN Berlin =

American military radio and television station in West Berlin

Coordinates: 52.450°N 13.275°E

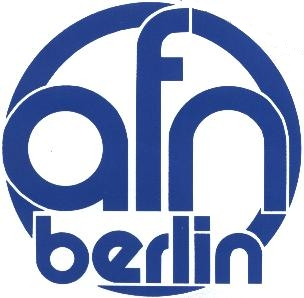
Station logo of AFN Berlin

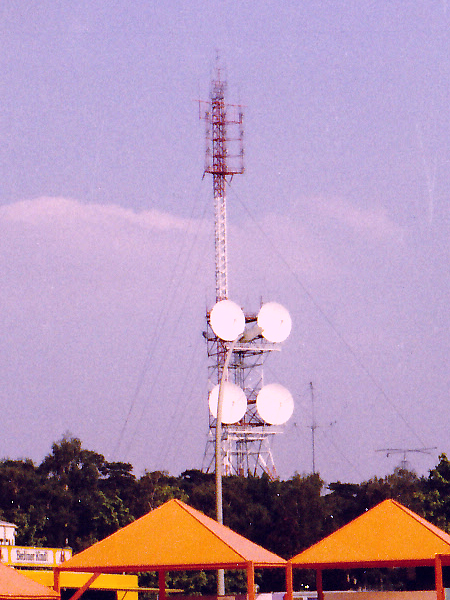
This transmitter at Clayallee was also used to broadcast AFN TV Berlin, 1986.

AFN Berlin was a US military broadcast station located at Podbielskiallee 28 in Berlin-Dahlem. It started broadcasting at noon on August 4, 1945, with the Rhapsody in Blue by George Gershwin. The TV studio was located on Saargemünder Strasse, across from Berlin Brigade Headquarters.

During the Berlin Blockade, AFN Berlin started broadcasting around the clock. After the construction of the Berlin Wall, AFN Berlin radio stayed on the air 24/7 until July 1994. TV programming was normally from 15:00 to 01:00 on weekdays and 12:00 to 01:00 on weekends during the mid-1970s.

AFN Berlin had three stations:

- A medium-wave AM station at 1107 kHz
- An FM station at 87.85 MHz (adjusted to 87.9 MHz at a later stage, called 88FM)
- A TV station on the UHF channel E29 (US channel 25) broadcasting in NTSC (thus requiring a multistandard set for German viewers) with a low-power transmitter limited to southwestern Berlin

Until November 23, 1978, the AM frequency was 935 kHz. Due to the agreements in the Geneva Frequency Plan, the frequency was changed to 1107 kHz.

On July 15, 1994, AFN Berlin aired a three-hour special broadcast on both radio frequencies, transmitted live in 54 countries. Afterward, seconds before 14:00, AFN Berlin ceased transmitting after playing a rendition of "The Star-Spangled Banner", performed by William Rivelli.

== History ==
On July 17, 1945, several GIs reached Berlin with their jeep and the order to set up a radio station within 17 days. They were followed by two trucks with a mobile transmitter, which were stationed not far from the future location of the transmitter. A 250-watt transmitter served listeners within a radius of just two miles. Stationary broadcasting began on August 4, 1945, at 12 p.m. with George Gershwin's Rhapsody in Blue from a confiscated villa at Podbielskiallee 28. Rhapsody in Blue was immediately followed by a song mocking Adolf Hitler: Right in the Fuehrer's Face. The first announcer and program director was Sergeant Mel Gelliart, who brought radio experience from WLS in Chicago. On October 13 AFN's jeep was stolen, having parked at the door of the studios.

On April 17, 1967, AFN Berlin started television broadcasts in black and white. The station's first manager was 1st Lt. Rallin J. Aars., who attended the ribbon cutting ceremony at 11 a.m., broadcasts started at 5 p.m. The station was carried from Dahlem-Zehlendorf on UHF channel 25 with an additional relay at Tempelhof Airport on channel 12. Due to differences in the standards used, German receivers had to be modified in order to receive the sound from these broadcasts.

The first color broadcasts were held in February 1977 in the NTSC standard.

== Productions ==
=== Radio (88FM) ===
Musical programs:

- An early morning show, host unknown, in late 1950s, Mon–Fri 7:00–8:00; theme song: an abbreviated version of: "s'Wonderful" by Ray Conniff.
- Before noon show, hosted by Mark Marcus, in late 1950s, Mon–Fri 11:00–12:00, popular music.
- Early afternoon: host unknown, weekdays 13:00–14:00, country & western music.
- Frolic at Five, host Georg Hudak, early to mid 1950s, and unknown host, mid 1950s, Mon–Fri, 17:00–18:00; theme song: "9:20 Special" recorded May 30, 1945 by Harry James.
- Music in the Air, host unknown, late 1950s, weekdays 19:00–20:00, light music.
- Frolic at Jazz, host unknown, Saturdays 18:00–19:00; theme tune: "Skinned & Skinned Again" by Woody Herman.
- The Juice.
- Disco.
- Special live broadcasts from the German-American Volksfest at the Hüttenweg in Berlin-Dahlem and from the annual Open House at Tempelhof Airport.
- An Afternoon Show Mon–Fri.

=== Television ===
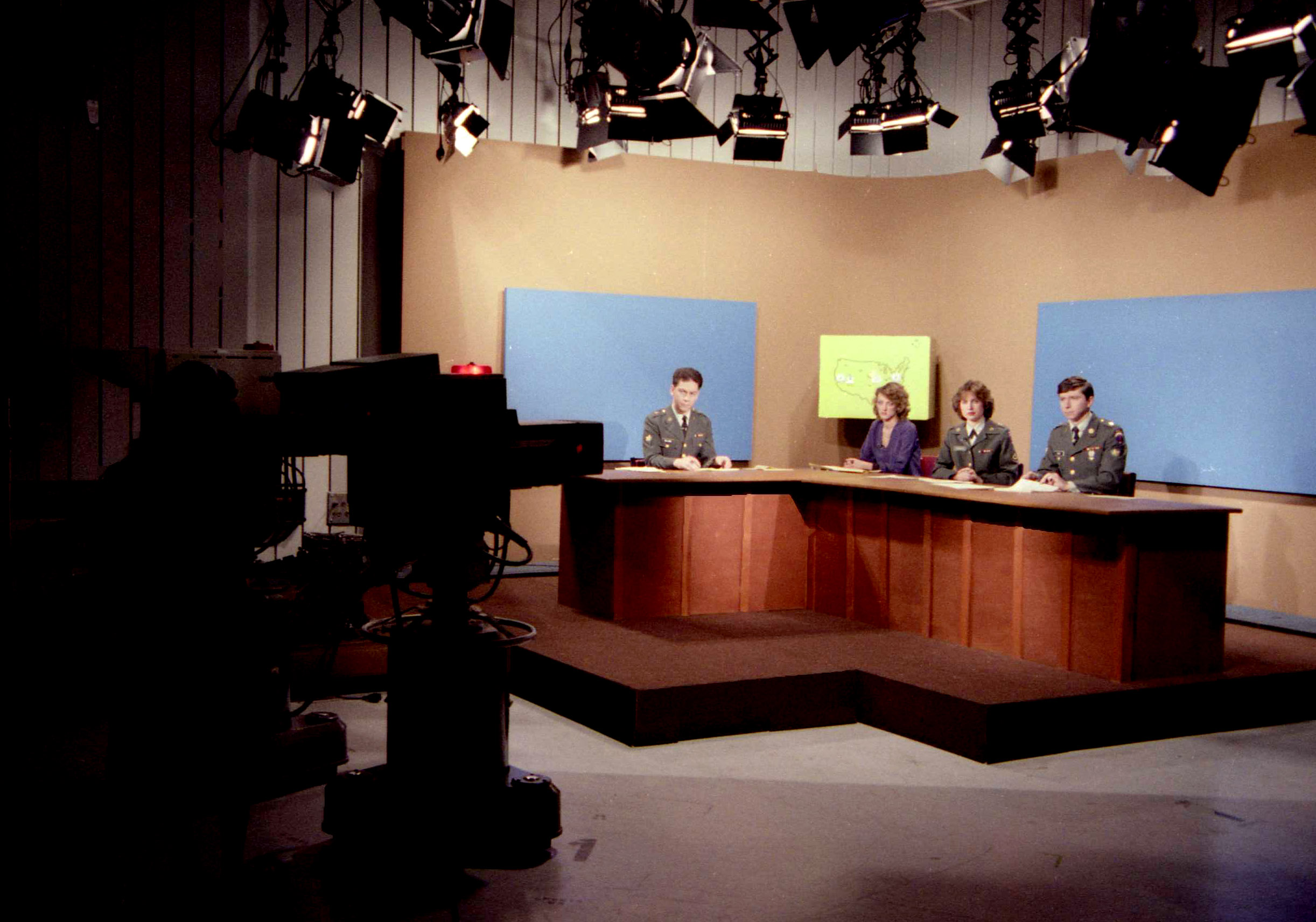
The evening TV news set at AFN Berlin in 1982 with (left to right) David Sullivan (sports), Loretta Nosworthy (weather), Cambria Pendleton (co-anchor) and Kyle King (main anchor). Photo slides from the AP and UPI news agencies were keyed electronically on the blue background.

- Berlin Tonight (daily news).
- Berlin PM (interview show).
- Berlin Tonight Late Edition (late news).
- Discover Berlin (trailers of Berlin sights).
- The Berlin Ramblers (30-minute live country music show, 1968 one Saturday afternoon monthly).
- Berlin Midday.
- Snowball Satellite (Christmas).
- P.L.P.'s Workshop (children's show Saturday mornings).
- Forum (news magazine).
- Get it Together (TV quiz show).
- Berlin Sports Roundup (weekly sports program hosted by SP4 Jim Rose 73–75).

== People of AFN Berlin ==
=== Radio ===
- Maj. Phillip R. Pierce OIC AFN Berlin 1986–1989
- David MacDonald
- Jacques Bannamon
- Jay Juliano
- Fred Cochran
- Rik DeLisle
- Jo Eager
- Eric Engbretson
- Rebecca Easley
- Lee Heft
- Maj. Jack Maloney (station commander 1960 -1963)
- Mark White (programming)
- Dick Rosse (news)
- George Hudak (Frolic At Five)
- Bob Lewis
- Mitch Farrell
- Ken McGyver
- Jim Stutzman "(American Music Hall)", "(Weekend World)"
- Ralph Stinson
- Jean Vavrin (cooking show "What's Cooking")
- Joey Welzant (engineer)
- Mike Marshall
- Howie Schwartz
- Jan Wood
- Ted Shrady
- Steve Kostelac
- Magnificent Magoo (Jim McCauley)
- Bob Selleck
- Dan Simmons
- Tom Tucker
- Hank Minitrez
- Bill Gaylord
- Paul Dandridge (until Sept. 1968)
- Terence Rousseau
- Bob Woodley
- Paul Ramirez
- Brian Hart (news)
- Patrick McGuire
- Vicki Washington
- Keya Newman
- Christina Leaird
- Gage Mace
- Jim Cyr
- Danette Rodesky
- Jerry Cormier
- Jeanine Kabrich
- Mike Niederer
- Larry Sem
- Joel O'Brien
- Jay Brady
- Mike Piper (news)
- Denis Sloan
- Rick Himot
- John Proffitt
- Ed Tooma
- Jim Kane
- Ed Poston (news)
- Edward Theodore Faircloth
- Gail Anderson
- Art Mehring
- Henry Michael (Ogrodzinski)
- Paul Markey (intern)
- William J. Moffitt
- Rich Hawkins
- Phil Harper

=== TV ===
- David MacDonald
- Jacques Bannamon
- Rebecca Easley
- Hank Minitrez
- Dan Quakkelaar
- Bob Selleck
- Bill Gaylord
- Terence Rousseau
- Brian Hart
- Patrick McGuire
- Vicki Washington
- Keya Newman
- Christina Leaird
- Jim Cyr
- Bob Woodley
- Paul Ramirez
- Peter Dolle
- Kyle King
- Danette Rodesky
- Jerry Cormier
- Dave Shepard
- Jeanine Kabrich
- Dave Sullivan
- Tom Hoban
- Bill Bright
- Vince Turella
- Debbie Frantz
- Joel O'Brien
- Susan Ward
- Mike Nussbaumer
- Dave Dudding
- Dave Jimanez
- Mike Pernatozzi
- John Rees
- Bruce Dortin
- Rick Saltzman
- Ron Grabert
- Jim Mauzy
- Jim Wright
- Kip Rummel
- Capt John Orton (OIC July 1973 - July 1976)
- John O'Conner
- Dennis Hannon
- Don Browers
- Wayne Boyles
- Danny Gates
- Al Scully
- Mike Niederer
- Peggy Foster
- Barry Cantor
- Gail Anderson
- Barbara Beimly
- Eldee McGill Jr
- Paul Markey (Intern)
- Chris Dancey (Intern)
- Al Cunningham (NCOIC Studio Operation)
- Russell Reed
- Larry Wilson
- Ralph Bremer
- Jack Arnold
- Linda Arnold
- Lionel Cantu
- Will Pratt
- Rick Mack
- Jinny Peek
- Douglas Mitchell
- Helga Lehmann
- Rodney Copfer
- Dexter Marquez
- Raymond Cooley
- Willie Green
- Russ Clark
- Fernando DeCosta
- Antonio Zollicoffer
- Jim Rose (Sports Director/Anchor 1973–75)

== See also ==
- American Forces Network
- AFN Bremerhaven
- AFN Frankfurt
- AFN Munich
