= Philipp Birkenmaier =

German civil servant (born 1975)

Chief of Staff to the Chancellor
- Incumbent
- Assumed office 5 January 2026
- Chancellor: Friedrich Merz
- Preceded by: Jacob Schrot

Personal details
- Born: 1975 (age 50–51) Tübingen
- Party: Christian Democratic Union

Philipp Birkenmaier (born 1975 in Tübingen) is a German civil servant who has been serving as chief of staff to chancellor Friedrich Merz since 2026. From 2024 to 2026, he served as federal managing director of the Christian Democratic Union.
