= Four Ds =

Principles of the post-war occupation of Germany

The term Four Ds refers to the four guiding principles of the allied occupation of Germany after World War II. Resulting from the Potsdam Conference in July to August 1945, they comprise: demilitarisation, denazification, decentralisation, and democratisation. Some historians add decartelisation or deindustrialisation to this list, creating the alternative name Five Ds.

While the disarmament of the Wehrmacht was accomplished soon after the end of hostilities, the remaining principles were applied to differing outcomes in the individual occupation zones. In the Western zones, denazification was achieved only partially in spite of the high-profile Nuremberg trials. Nevertheless, a federal and democratic state was soon created. In the Soviet occupation zone, society was cleansed of Nazi elements more thoroughly, but a Marxist–Leninist one-party state (East Germany) emerged in the wake of denazification.

== Outcome of the Potsdam Conference ==
In July 1945, delegations from the allied powers convened at Cecilienhof palace in Potsdam near Berlin in order to confer about the reorganisation of Occupied Germany. Due to incipient rifts between the Soviet Union and their anglophone allies, the United States and the United Kingdom, the conference failed to agree upon a comprehensive long-term strategy. However, a resolution, known as the Potsdam Agreement, was signed on 2 August 1945. The policies stipulated in the agreement aimed to "forever divest Germany from her potential for aggressive war." Historians have summarised the guiding principles behind these policies as the Four Ds: demilitarisation, denazification, decentralisation, and democratisation. Some sources describe Five Ds, adding the principle of decartelisation or deindustrialisation.

== Four Ds ==
=== Demilitarisation ===
The most immediate aim of the allied forces was the complete demilitarisation of Germany. This involved, in the earliest stage, the disarmament of all remaining German military personnel. According to military historian Sheldon Goldberg, the process of disbanding the armed forces did not prove an obstacle since "most [remaining soldiers] simply dropped their weapons, raised their arms, and surrendered". Another aspect of demilitarisation was to be the destruction of all German fortifications and war industry. In the long term, the Allies planned to eradicate semblances of militarism from the cultural background of the occupied population.

=== Denazification ===
Already before the German surrender in May 1945, it had become clear to the Allies that Germany would have to be purged of National Socialism and its influence. Their most immediate measure was to instigate a series of military tribunals at Nuremberg which were to try those responsible for the Holocaust and the war crimes committed by the Wehrmacht. In the Western occupation zones, Spruchkammern, committees of German citizens who were uninvolved in the crimes of the Third Reich, were formed. Their purpose was to determine the degree of complicity of individual Nazi sympathisers and to hand down punishments. In the long term, the Western occupiers planned to re-educate the German population towards a liberal and democratic society.

=== Decentralisation ===
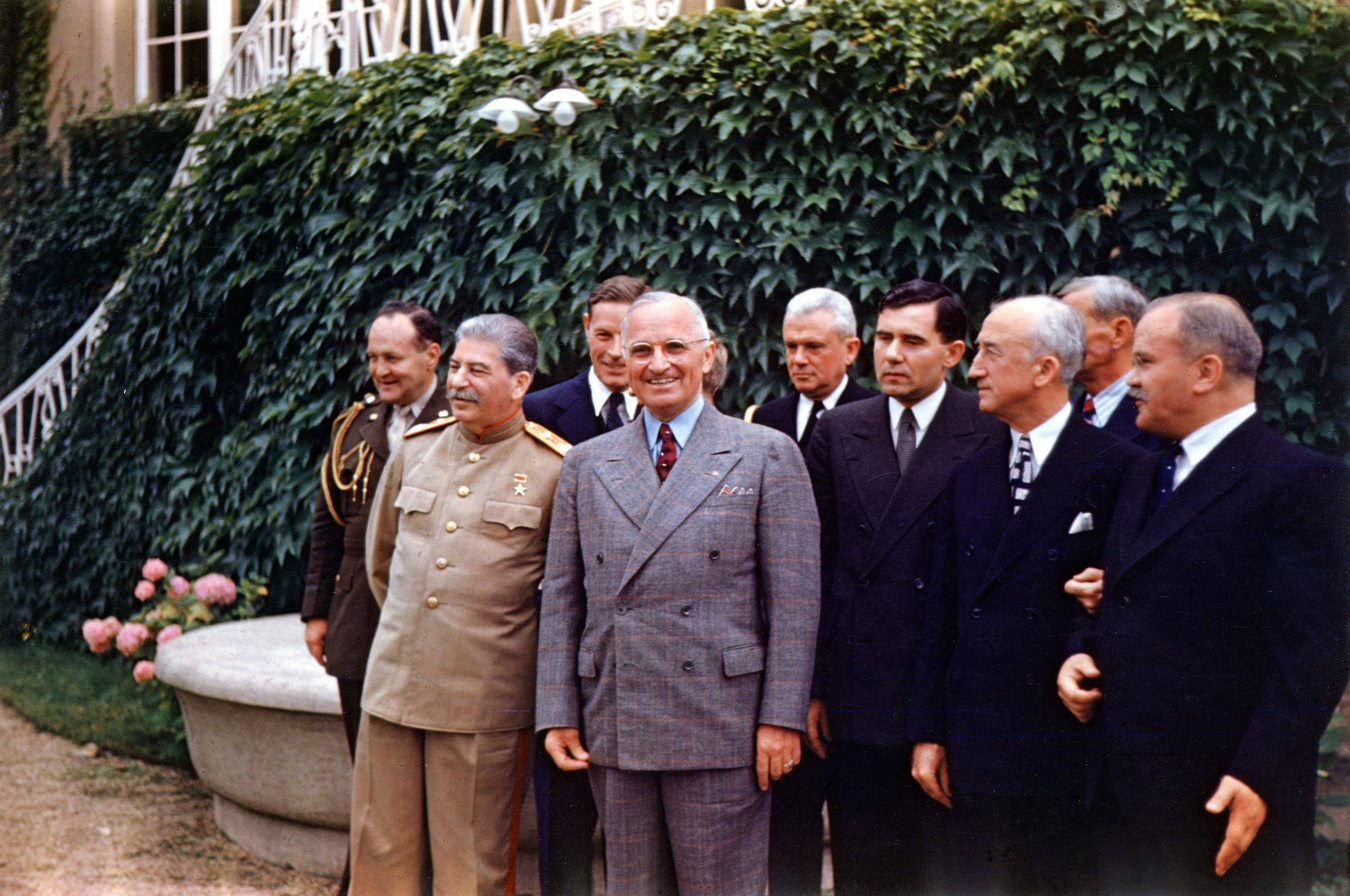
US President Harry S. Truman and Soviet leader Joseph Stalin at the Potsdam Conference, where the Four Ds were agreed upon.

Although Germany had longstanding roots in decentralised government, both the Weimar Republic and the Third Reich had seen an increase of power in the hands of the central government in Berlin. The Allied Control Council, the joint governing body of the occupying nations, sought to reverse this trend by creating federal structures akin to those in the United States. Their policy resulted in the formation of several new federal entities (Bundesländer) and the abolition of the Free State of Prussia, which had been the dominant state in the previous two constitutional models.

=== Democratisation ===
The Potsdam Agreement stipulated that Germany should eventually be reconstructed on a peaceful and democratic basis. In 1946, the areas occupied by the Western allies held regional and state elections. This process of democratic development culminated in the 1949 West German federal election held by the newly formed Federal Republic of Germany. However, democratic institutions did not develop on a parallel trajectory in the Soviet occupation zone, where a one-party state with Marxist–Leninist traits emerged.

== Legacy ==
The historian Edgar Wolfrum writes that the Four Ds were generally successful, pointing in particular the complete success of allied demilitarisation. He also states that denazification succeeded only partially and that by the 1950s many Nazi collaborators had evaded prosecution all-together. However, in the long run, allied re-education efforts led to the what Wolfrum terms a "civilising process" of the German population. In the Soviet occupied territory, a different picture emerges: while denazification was much more thorough than in the West, the promise of democratisation was replaced with a Communist dictatorship.

== Works cited ==
- Beyme, Klaus von (1984). "West Germany: Federalism". International Political Science Review. 5 (4): 381–96. doi:10.1177/019251218400500405. JSTOR 1601005. S2CID 220874702.
- Erler, Fritz (1965). Democracy in Germany. Cambridge, MA: Harvard University Press. ISBN 978-0-674-18909-6.
- Goldberg, Sheldon A. (2017). From Disarmament to Rearmament : The Reversal of US Policy Toward West Germany, 1946–1955. Athens, OH: Ohio University Press. ISBN 9780821423004.
- Grieder, Peter (2012). The German Democratic Republic. London: Palgrave Macmillan. ISBN 9780230356863.
- Taylor, Frederick (2011). Exorcising Hitler: The Occupation and Denazification of Germany. London: Bloomsbury. ISBN 9781408824511.
- Wolfrum, Edgar (2006). Die geglückte Demokratie. Stuttgart: Klett-Cotta. ISBN 978-3608941418.
