= AFN Munich =

Radio station

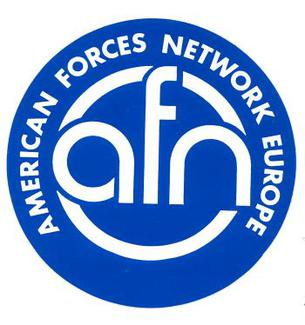
- Munich; Germany
- Frequencies: FM: 102.4 MHz; AM: 1142 kHz

Programming
- Language: English
- Affiliations: American Forces Network

Ownership
- Owner: US Government

History
- First air date: 10 July 1945
- Last air date: 14 February 1992

Links
- Website: afneurope.net

The AFN Munich was a radio station of the American Forces Network of the United States Army, operating from Munich, Bavaria, from 1945 to 1992. The station carried the nickname "The voice of Southern Bavaria".

The station was the first AFN station to operate in occupied Germany.

== History ==
In April 1945, towards the end of World War II, Munich was occupied by the 7th US Army. Radio broadcasts for the United States armed forces were, at the time, made from the United Kingdom and France. In July 1945, transmissions began from occupied Germany too.

On 10 July 1945, the AFN Munich commenced broadcasting as the first AFN station in Germany. It operated from a villa in the Kaulbachstraße that had previously belonged to Adolf Wagner, Nazi Gauleiter of the Gau München-Oberbayern. The first broadcast, made by Major Bob Light, began with the following sentence:

Good morning! This is AFN Munich, the voice of the 7th Army!

Light's first broadcast was incorrect as the 3rd US Army had taken over control over Munich the previous night, a fact Light had missed. General George S. Patton, commander of the 3rd Army, was furious about the mistake, demanding that the responsible person be court martialed. Patton, not a friend of the American Forces Network in the first place, was shaving at the time and cut himself on hearing the broadcast. Light was surrounded by Military Police on Patton's order but managed to convince them of his innocence and returned to AFN Paris before the end of the day.

The station, broadcasting with one of the strongest signals in Germany, could be received in the northern parts of the country. It enjoyed immense popularity with young Germans too, as it allowed them to listen to Jazz and Blues, outlawed during the Third Reich, and later to Rock 'n' Roll and Country music. It also helped Germans learn English in order to be able to understand the broadcasts.

The station had many high-profile visitors, including Jimmy Carter, Freddie Mercury, Lou Gramm, John Glenn, Huey Lewis and The News, Lynyrd Skynyrd, The Scorpions, Bruce Hornsby, Molly Hatchet, The Gap Band, and John McCain.

In 1963, the station changed its frequencies, moving from 1106 to 1045 kHz on the mediumwave AM band, and from 101.2 to 102.4 MHz on the FM band.

In 1973 a study was carried out that recommended closing down the station if US forces in the region were significantly reduced. In 1982 it was suggested that the station should relocate from number 15 Kaulbachstraße to number 45, into a building formerly utilised by the Bundeswehr. The cost for the alterations to the new location were covered by the Bavarian government, and AFN Munich started broadcasting from number 45 on 12 November 1984. The villa at number 15, home of the station for almost 40 years, was returned to the Bavarian government.

AFN Munich stayed at its new location for a much shorter time than at the old one. The end of the Cold War and the reduction of US forces in Europe, with the closure of some of their Munich facilities, meant the end of the station. On 14 February 1992, at 3 p.m., AFN Munich hosted what was called "The last radio show", DJ'd by Army Sergeant Jef Reilly. AFN Munich ceased transmitting after playing the national anthem of the United States of America by Whitney Houston & The Florida Orchestra.

Nothing remains of the station at either of its two former locations.

== See also ==
- AFN Bremerhaven
- AFN Berlin
- AFN Europe
- AFN Frankfurt
