= AFN Frankfurt =

American military radio station in Germany

AFN Frankfurt was a radio station in Frankfurt, Germany, that was operational from 1945 to 2004. It was a part of the American Forces Network (AFN) broadcasting to US soldiers serving overseas, and long served as headquarters of AFN Europe. It was popular not just with soldiers, but also with a German "shadow audience", and was instrumental in introducing several American musical styles to German listeners.

== History ==
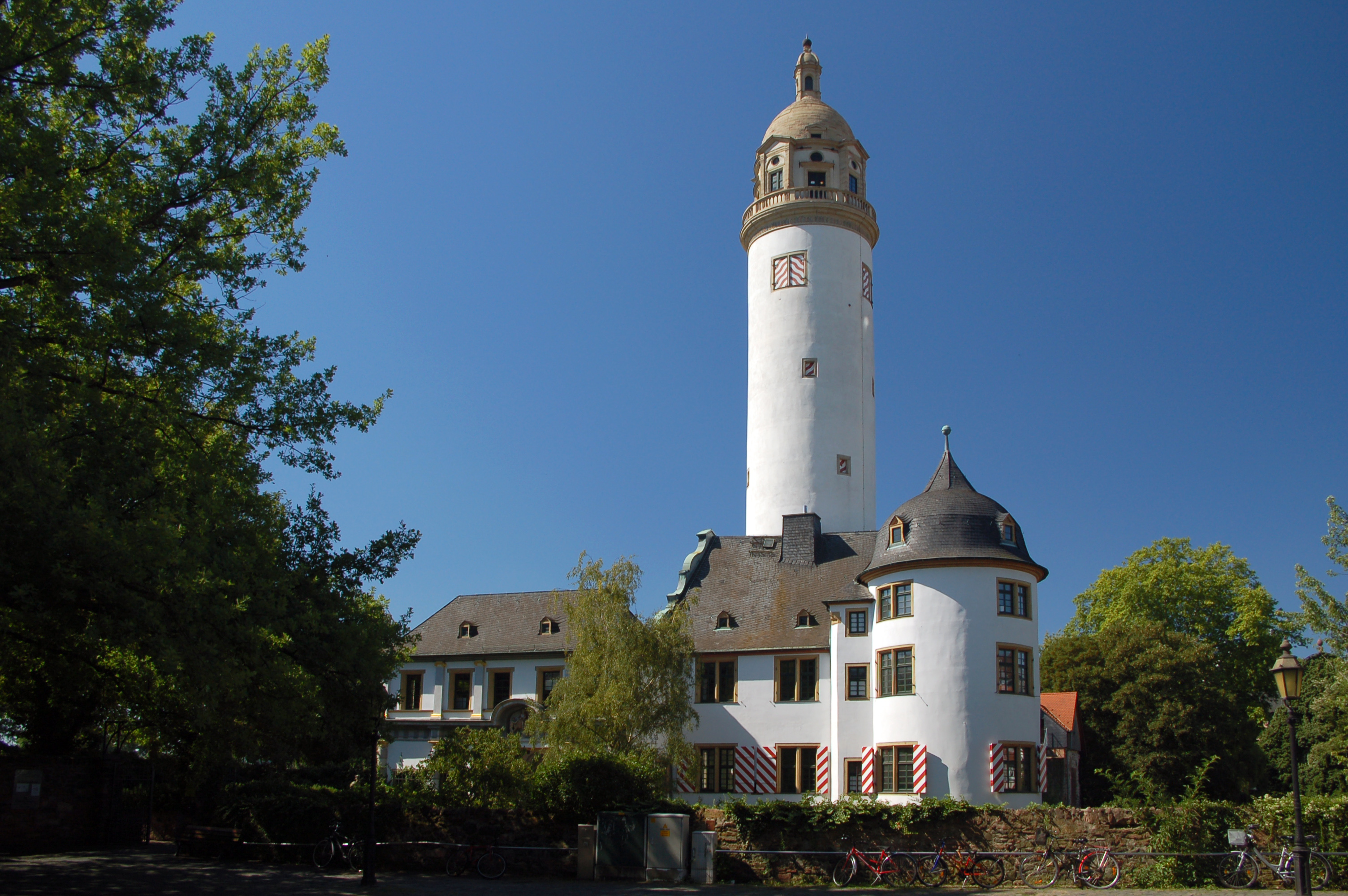
Höchst Castle

During World War II, the US military began establishing American Forces Network radio stations in Europe, starting in London on 4 July 1943. The AFN Frankfurt station first broadcast from a confiscated house in Frankfurt, on 15 July 1945. To soundproof the walls, staff used old Wehrmacht uniforms. When it was decided soon after to move the AFN headquarters for Europe to Frankfurt, a larger site became necessary, and the US military then requisitioned Höchst Castle, a schloss dating back to the 14th century close in Höchst. The castle's owners, the von Brüning family, were given only a few hours to collect their belongings, but were promised to be able to return within 24 hours. AFN moved there in October 1946. The medieval tower was used to house the unmarried staff, with the newest member given the small top floor room. The headquarters stayed in Höchst until 1966, when they moved to the Dornbusch quarter of Frankfurt, next to the Broadcasting House Dornbusch, where the headquarters of Hessischer Rundfunk, the public broadcaster of the state of Hesse, are located. The Frankfurt site was shut down in 2004, when the headquarters of AFN Europe moved to Mannheim.

== Content and scheduling ==
In 1954, AFN Frankfurt sent thirteen hours of programming per day to the other stations in Europe, which would produce another six hours daily locally for a 06:00-01:00 program. A large part of the program originated in American commercial stations, but was stripped of commercials before broadcast on AFN. Because of the time difference, many sports events were recorded on tape to be re-broadcast at a more suitable local time. A fifteen-minute Report from Europe with European news was broadcast five days a week. In 1986, the schedule had five minutes of news every hour on the hour.

== Reception and influence ==
AFN was popular in Germany for decades, not just with American military personnel. It had lasting importance, more than in other countries. Together with AFN Berlin and AFN Munich, AFN Frankfurt had many young German listeners and influenced also the programming of German radio stations. AFN was influential in returning jazz music to Germany, and AFN Frankfurt cooperated with Radio Frankfurt (which would become the Hessischer Rundfunk). AFN Frankfurt organized their first jazz concert on 17 May 1945. Cooperation with the HR was instrumental in starting the Deutsches Jazzfestival in 1953. The program director Johnny Vrotsos also collaborated regularly with the German Hotclub Combo jazz band. AFN was also instrumental in introducing blues, country, Western and rock and roll music to Germany. AFN Frankfurt has been credited with popularising rap and hip hop music in the local area.

In the 1960s, AFN was also highly respected for its news service, both among Americans and its "shadow audience" of Germans. It was estimated that about a million Germans listened to AFN once per week, roughly the same number of listeners as the Voice of America. However, the programming was deliberately not adapted to the shadow audience, and the military commanders were opposed to using the network as a tool for propaganda directed at Germans.

== Transmitters and frequencies ==
AFN Frankfurt was broadcast in AM on the 872 kHz frequency from the Weißkirchen radio transmitter, with a power of 150 kW, three times the maximum power allowed in the United States. The frequency later changed to 873 kHz. In FM, the frequency was 98.7 MHz, broadcast from the Feldberg/Taunus transmitter.

== Notable presenters ==
The presenter Gary Bautell worked for AFN Frankfurt from 1962, where he hosted three different DJ programs, the music programs "The Dufflebag Show" and "Music in the Air" and the poetry and jazz program "Midnight in Europe". Gary remained in Germany as a news reporter and presenter until his death in November of 2022. He was fluent in spoken German and his death was widely mourned. https://www.stripes.com/veterans/obituaries/2022-11-30/afn-europe-legend-gary-bautell-8243769.html

In the 1960's AFN Frankfurt presented several local popular music shows including Tom Alford's Morning show (06:15-08:00), country & western's Stickbuddy Jamboree (16:05-17:00) with Woody Gosnell, and Music Off the Record 17:05-18:00 with Tom Gauger playing Top 40 music from the US. During the dinner hour (19:05-20:00), AFN Frankfurt fed the entire network an easy-listening show called "Music In the Air." Staff announcers included Jim Ochs, Shel Smith, Ken Larvick, Hank Baughman, Nolan Kenner, Rick Scarry and others. After completing their military time at AFN all returned to civilian life as broadcasters. AFN's network news broadcasts were written and broadcast from AFN Frankfurt. The newscasts were tightly written by News Director Bill Marsh and his brother Bob, David Mynatt, Ian MacLeod, Armand Schwartz, John Grimaldi, Frank Greif and several others.

== See also ==
- AFN Berlin
- AFN Bremerhaven
- AFN Munich

== Bibliography ==
- Alliiertenmuseum (2001). The link with home - und die Deutschen hörten zu = The link with home - and the Germans listened in = The link with home - les auditeurs allemands à l'écoute: die Rundfunksender der Westmächte von 1945 bis 1994 (PDF). Berlin: Alliiertenmuseum. OCLC 248209954.
- American Forces Information Service and Armed Forces Radio and Television Service; American Forces Information Service; United States; American Forces Radio and Television Service (1993). History of AFRTS, the first 50 years. Alexandria, Va.?. OCLC 28320775.
- Bennett, Andy (2000). Popular music and youth culture : music, identity, and place. Houndmills, Basingstoke, Hampshire; New York: Palgrave. ISBN 978-0-312-22753-1.
- Borthwick, Stuart (2004). Popular music genres : an introduction. Edinburgh: Edinburgh University Press. pp. 156–175. doi:10.1515/9781474428767-012. ISBN 978-1-4744-2876-7. OCLC 1145341424.
- Craig, R. Stephen (January 1986). "The American forces network, Europe: A case study in military broadcasting". Journal of Broadcasting & Electronic Media. 30 (1): 33–46. doi:10.1080/08838158609386606. ISSN 0883-8151.
- Craig, R. Stephen (June 1988). "American forces network in the cold war: Military broadcasting in postwar Germany". Journal of Broadcasting & Electronic Media. 32 (3): 307–321. doi:10.1080/08838158809386704. ISSN 0883-8151.
- Dougherty, Kevin (29 October 2004). "Silence in Frankfurt: AFN fades to black, moves to Mannheim". Stars and Stripes.
- Emery, Walter B (1971). Broadcasting and government: responsibilities and regulations. East Lansing: Michigan State University Press. ISBN 978-0-87013-159-2. OCLC 162975.
- Glover, Herb; Provan, John; Williams, Roger (July 2003). "AFN Europe 1943–2003: 60 years and counting" (PDF). R&R.
- Kater, Michael H. (June 2006). "New Democracy and Alternative Culture: Jazz in West Germany after the Second World War". Australian Journal of Politics and History. 52 (2): 173–187. doi:10.1111/j.1467-8497.2005.00413.x. ISSN 0004-9522.
- Koch, Hans-Jürgen (2005). Ganz Ohr : eine Kulturgeschichte des Radios in Deutschland. Köln : Böhlau. ISBN 978-3-412-13503-4.
- Price, Harold G. (June 1954). ""Serving the American Forces in Europe"". Army Information Digest 1954-06: Vol 9 Iss 6. Superintendent of Documents. pp. 35–39.
- Provan, John. "2003: Die Geschichte von AFN (Teil 2)". www.radiojournal.de (in German).
- Smith, George A. (14 December 2012). "You may not know him, but you've probably heard him". www.army.mil.
