= National Security Council (Germany) =

Committee of the Bundeskabinett

National Security Council (German: Nationaler Sicherheitsrat) is a committee of the German Bundeskabinett with the task to make better use of information on security issues collected by various agencies of the German government and to prepare decisions on security related matters. The National Security Council will also take over responsibilities in the field of arms export controls from the Federal Security Council. The National Security Council was created in August 2025. The creation of the council was a major campaign pledge by Friedrich Merz in the run up to the general election of February 2025. It is also a reaction to the perception that decision making within Germany's foreign and defense policy institutions is often sluggish and suffers from a lack of coordination between relevant ministries and agencies.

== Current composition ==
Office	Name
Member
Chancellor	Friedrich Merz (Chairman)
Minister of Finance; Vice Chancellor	Lars Klingbeil (Vice Chairman)
Minister of Foreign Affairs	Johann Wadephul
Minister of the Interior	Alexander Dobrindt
Minister of Defense	Boris Pistorius
Minister for Economic Affairs and Energy	Katherina Reiche
Minister of Justice	Stefanie Hubig
Minister of Digitalization and Modernization	Karsten Wildberger
Minister of International Development	Reem Alabali-Radovan
Minister of the Chancellery	Thorsten Frei
Permanent guests
Press Secretary	Stefan Kornelius
Inspector General of the Bundeswehr	General Carsten Breuer
President of the Federal Intelligence Service	Martin Jäger
President of the Federal Service for the Protection of the Constitution	Sinan Selen
President of the Military Counterintelligence Service	Martina Rosenberg
President of the Federal Bureau of Criminal Investigation	Holger Münch
President of the Federal Police	Dieter Romann
