= Bremerhaven Army Airfield =

Former military airfield near Bremerhaven

Bremerhaven Army Airfield Seefliegerhorst Weddewarden Advanced Landing Ground R-57
- Bremerhaven Army Airfield (Germany)

Site information
- Type: Military Airfield
- Controlled by: United States Army Air Forces

Location
- Coordinates: 53°35′00″N 008°33′23″E

Site history
- In use: 1944
- Battles/wars: Western Front (World War II)

Bremerhaven Army Airfield is a former military airfield, located 4.1 km northeast of Bremerhaven in the Bremen Free State of Germany.

== Overview ==
Bremerhaven Army Airfield (Also known as Seefliegerhorst Weddewarden) was used by the United States Army and Air Force as a base in Northern West Germany during the Cold War to support the American presence in the Bremen area. It was headquarters of the US Army Garrison Bremerhaven which performed transshipment of supplies and military equipment and hosted transport and support units. The USAF stationed the 606 Tactical Control Squadron (a mobile radar unit) at the site and it was a major communications control unit. The United States Navy stationed the Weser River Patrol at the station until their task was transferred to the German Coast Guard, and operated a Naval Security Group unit in the same compound until late 1972. AFN Bremerhaven also operated from the compound.

The airfield was closed in 1993 as part of the US drawdown of military forces in Germany after the end of the Cold War.

== History ==
=== Origins ===
Construction of the airfield began in 1925 between the villages of Speckenbüttel and Weddewarden, north of the harbour area of Wesermünde. In the immediate surrounding area there were no buildings. A year after construction began the airfield was taken into service. In 1927 German airline Lufthansa opened a support facility at the airfield and opened services to the German Frisian islands and Helgoland.

After the National-Socialists assumed power in Germany in 1933, the decision was taken to expand the airfield into a military air base. As a consequence the airfield was taken over by the Luftwaffe in 1935, which constructed several large hangars and barracks on the northwestern edge of the airfield. The flying occurred from a grass field, with aircraft taking off into the wind from any direction. Only the aircraft parking ramp and the ring taxiway were hardened.

On the southern end of the airfield the Nordhafen was dug out. At the time it was known as the "Zeppelinhafen" (Zeppelin-port) or the Flugzeugträgerbecken (aircraftcarrier dock), intended as berth for the German aircraft carrier "Graf Zeppelin". To the east another dock was dug, intended for the carriers sistership (only known as "Flugzeugträger B"). The carrier "Graf Zeppelin" was 85% complete in 1940 when all work was ordered to be stopped, and the ship never was completed.

=== World War II ===
During World War II the airfield was used mainly by German Navy flying units (Seeflieger), and in October 1942 the Minensuchgruppe I (Mine Searching Group I) was established, flying Ju-52MS aircraft, fitted with a large electromagnetic mine detonating ring to locate mines in the coastal waters of Bremen.

In April 1945 the airfield became the replacement site for the development of the V-weapons. The Erprobungsstelle (Test Unit) Karlshagen, better known today as Peenemünde-West was in danger over being overrun by the Soviet Red Army so all of its materiel and personnel were moved west to Bremerhaven.

Development of rocket weapons was to take place here from now on, and the large hangars were filled with fuselages and parts of Fi-103, X-4, BV-346 and the gliderbomb Hs-293. The base was partially destroyed when British Forces moved into the area on 7 May 1945, one day before the official German Capitulation.

=== United States use ===
Although northwest Germany was to become a British occupation zone, an exclave was granted to the US Army in the area between Bremen and Nordholz. The US needed a support point with a harbour, to allow the unhindered support of US forces in the American Occupation Zone in Southern Germany. The US Army moved into the airfield as early as May 1945, and used the port to return troops from Europe to the United States. Until 1947 the US airforce also used the Nordholz Airbase.

Initially several locations were used by the Americans, but over time they were reduced in number until by the 1960s they all merged into the joint location referred to as the "Staging Area" and became home to units of the US Army Terminal Command, Europe (USATCEUR), US Navy, US Coast Guard and US Air Force. In 1973 the barracks were renamed Carl Schurz Barracks.

After the Cold War ended the US reduced their presence in Germany. In an effort to further reduce costs most of the goods were sent through the Dutch port of Rotterdam, ending the need for Bremerhaven. This ended the American presence and the military units were withdrawn in 1993, leaving only a small civilian contingent to coordinate the remaining transshipments.

Today, the former airfield has been redeveloped into a large storage yard for the Bremerhaven shipping facilities.
