= Interzonal traffic =

Post-WWII travel in occupied Germany

Inter-zonal traffic was the cross-border traffic between the four designated garrison zones in Germany between 1945 and 1973 that were created in 1945 by the victors of the Second World War.

== History ==
Following the military occupation of Germany in May 1945, civilians were initially only allowed to leave their place of residence or its immediate vicinity with a permit from the garrison authority of their zone. By June 1945, the bus and train service within the respective garrison zones had been resumed on many stretches. However, the public train service did not run between the garrison zones. Nevertheless, there were numerous travelers who crossed the extensive uncontrolled boundaries between the garrison zones on foot, by bicycle or by hitch-hiking.

On June 30, 1946, the boundary between the Soviet garrison zone and the Western garrison zones (the American, British and French zones) was blocked. The Soviet military administration in Germany (SMAD) had previously asked the Allies to secure the line of demarcation to the Western zones. A special identification card, the Inter-zones Travel Passport (Germany), known as the inter-zones passport, was introduced by the Allies. This had to be applied for by citizens wishing to travel in occupied Germany.

The passport was valid for 30 days and only valid for travel between zones within Germany. On July 23, 1946, all restrictions on travel between the British and the American garrison zone were canceled (in preparation for the Bizone). In August 1948 the French zone joined the Bizone to become the Trizone. On July 13, 1948, the Soviet Military Administration in Germany (SMAD) issued a decree that travelers between the Western garrison zones and the Soviet garrison zone would also need a residence permit of the Soviet garrison zone in addition to the inter-zones passport.

As of November 14, 1953, the Federal Republic of Germany agreed with the Western Allies to abandon boundary inspection controls for inter-zone traffic. On November 25, 1953, the inter-zones passport was abolished because the GDR government also stopped checking it. GDR inhabitants now had to apply for a departure permit if they wished to leave the zone's boundary. About 4% of GDR citizens traveled into the West with permission but did not return again.

Once the Berlin Wall was built, it became yet substantially more difficult to obtain a departure permit. Except for business trips, only pensioners with family matters to attend to were able to travel into the West and only for a limited amount of time.

== Trains ==
On August 5, 1945, the first goods train went out of the Ruhr Valley to Berlin. The non-stop passenger service, however, did not run until May 1946. The first (and until 1949 only) inter-zones express train, which was reserved exclusively for foreign travelers, ran between Berlin and Osnabrück.

== Berlin blockade ==
The railroad traffic between Berlin and the Western zones was interrupted between April 22, 1948, and May 12, 1949, allegedly due to structural work, but in fact because of the Berlin Blockade crisis. Because the single express train route in inter-zonal traffic (FD 111/112) between Cologne and Berlin was permanently overburdened, five additional express train routes started to run over the German domestic boundary on September 10, 1949:

- FD 1/2 between Berlin and Frankfurt am Main
- FD 63/64 between Berlin and Hamburg
- FDt 65/66 as an express train between Berlin and Hamburg
- FD 109/110 as a second train route between Berlin and Cologne
- FD 149/150 between Berlin and Munich

== Road traffic ==
On August 25, 1946, an inter-zones bus connection was opened between Berlin and Hanover. However the bus traffic was interrupted again and again through political crises. For example, the Erfurt transport company had to stop interzone bus transport, which was also used to obtain spare parts, in 1953.

== Air traffic ==
There was no regular air traffic between the Western zones and the Soviet garrison zone. The first domestic air route was only set up by Lufthansa on August 10, 1989, between Frankfurt am Main and Leipzig. However, several foreign airlines (notably Pan Am and Air Berlin) were permitted to provide service (called Inter-German Service) between West Berlin and several West German cities.
