= Federal Security Council (Germany) =

Cabinet committee of the German government

- Bundessicherheitsrat

Agency overview
- Formed: 6 October 1955; 70 years ago
- Jurisdiction: Germany
- Headquarters: Federal Chancellery, Berlin, Germany
- Agency executive: Chairman, Federal Chancellor Friedrich Merz

Federal Security Council (German: Bundessicherheitsrat) was a cabinet committee of the Federal Government of Germany that advised on national security policy issues, particularly in all areas of defense, as well as disarmament and arms control. Its public presence was primarily in connection with the approval of arms exports. It was chaired by the Chancellor of Germany. Its establishment was decided by the Second Adenauer cabinet on October 6, 1955. The constitutive meeting took place on October 21, 1955. In 2025 the Federal Security Council was superseded by a newly formed National Security Council. The new National Security Council will take over the responsibilities of the Federal Security Council with additional responsibilities and capabilities to collect and analyse information pertaining to Germany's national security.

== History ==
In 1955, the Allied agencies in West Germany and Austria were dissolved (Bonn–Paris conventions and the Austrian State Treaty), West Germany joined NATO, and the Warsaw Pact was founded. During this period, the Council was established under the name Bundesverteidigungsrat (Defense Council) as a cabinet committee of the Federal Government for security policy, structured in such a way that its rules of procedure even provided for the possibility of forming interministerial committees. On 28th of November 1969 it received its current name.

Since the 1980s, the significance of the Federal Security Council narrowed, and its scope of activity was essentially limited to arms export policy, which is regulated in the Basic Law.

In the 1998 coalition agreement between the Red-Green coalition government, the Federal Security Council was given greater importance for the first time:

The new federal government will restore the Federal Security Council to its originally intended role as a body coordinating German security policy and create the necessary conditions for this... The transnational European arms industry will be subject to a binding European code of conduct for its export activities. The new federal government will work to ensure that a requirement for transparency and the human rights status of potential recipient countries are included as criteria. German national arms exports outside NATO and the EU will be handled restrictively. The human rights status of potential recipient countries will be introduced as an additional decision-making criterion in arms export decisions. The new federal government will submit an annual arms export report to the German Bundestag

— Coalition agreement between the SPD and Alliance 90/The Greens from 1998

== Powers ==
According to its procedures the Federal Security Council advised on security policy issues, particularly in all areas of defense, as well as disarmament and arms control. It took preliminary decisions, where possible, or prepared the relevant political decisions of the Federal Chancellor or the Federal Government. The Federal Security Council could make final decisions unless a resolution by the Federal Government is required under the Basic Law or a federal law. The meetings of the Federal Security Council were secret

The greater emphasis on the situation in the recipient countries of arms exports had made decision-making in the Security Council more difficult. While the governments before Chancellor Gerhard Schröder relied on a consensual decisionmaking by the council, which met in secret and whose members were bound to secrecy, majority decisions were now introduced, and meeting items were increasingly reported to the press. According to practice, the Federal Government presents an annual report on arms exports, which contains statistical information on export permits issued and gives figures for the types of arms concerned as well as their destination. As a general rule, the Federal Government, if asked, was required to inform the Bundestag that the Federal Security Council had approved a given armaments export transaction or not.

In its capacity as a permanent cabinet committee, it contrasted, on the one hand, with the Defence Committee of the German Bundestag as a parliamentary committee and, on the other hand, with the Security Cabinet (German: Sicherheitskabinett) as an informal, only occasionally convened discussion group. From 1964 to 1967, there was also a separate federal ministry for the affairs of the Federal Defence Council.

== Members at the last meeting ==
Name	Office
Friedrich Merz	Chancellor of Germany
Thorsten Frei	Chancellery manager
Johann Wadephul	Minister of Foreign Affairs
Boris Pistorius	Minister of Defense
Lars Klingbeil	Minister of Finance
Alexander Dobrindt	Minister of Interior
Stefanie Hubig	Minister of Justice
Katherina Reiche	Minister for Economy and Energy
Reem Alabali-Radovan	Minister for Economic Cooperation and Development
Carsten Breuer	Inspector General of the Bundeswehr
Dörte Dinger	Director of the Bundespräsidialamt
Stefan Kornelius	Director of the Press and Information
