= Feldberg/Taunus transmitter =

Broadcasting facility in Taunus, Germany

Coordinates: 50.23204°N 8.45727°E

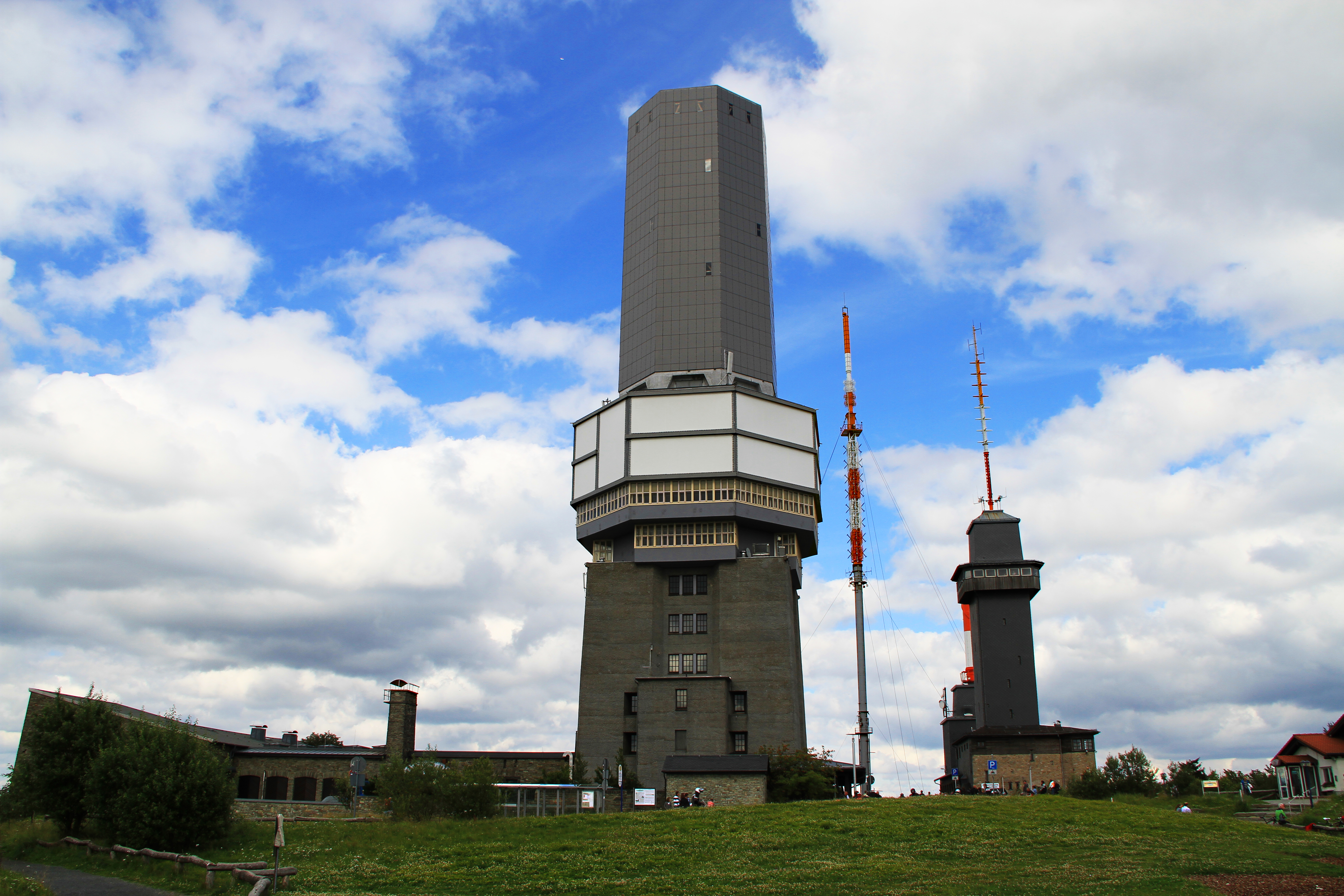
The four towers at the Feldberg/Taunus transmitter site

The Feldberg/Taunus transmitter is a facility for FM- and TV-broadcasting and for directional radio services located on the Großer Feldberg, the highest mountain in the Taunus region of Germany.

For FM- and TV-broadcasting; a 116.17-metre-high (381.1 ft) guyed tubular mast is used, while for radio relay services a tower of unique design is used, which is a combination of a multistory building and a telecommunications tower.

== History ==
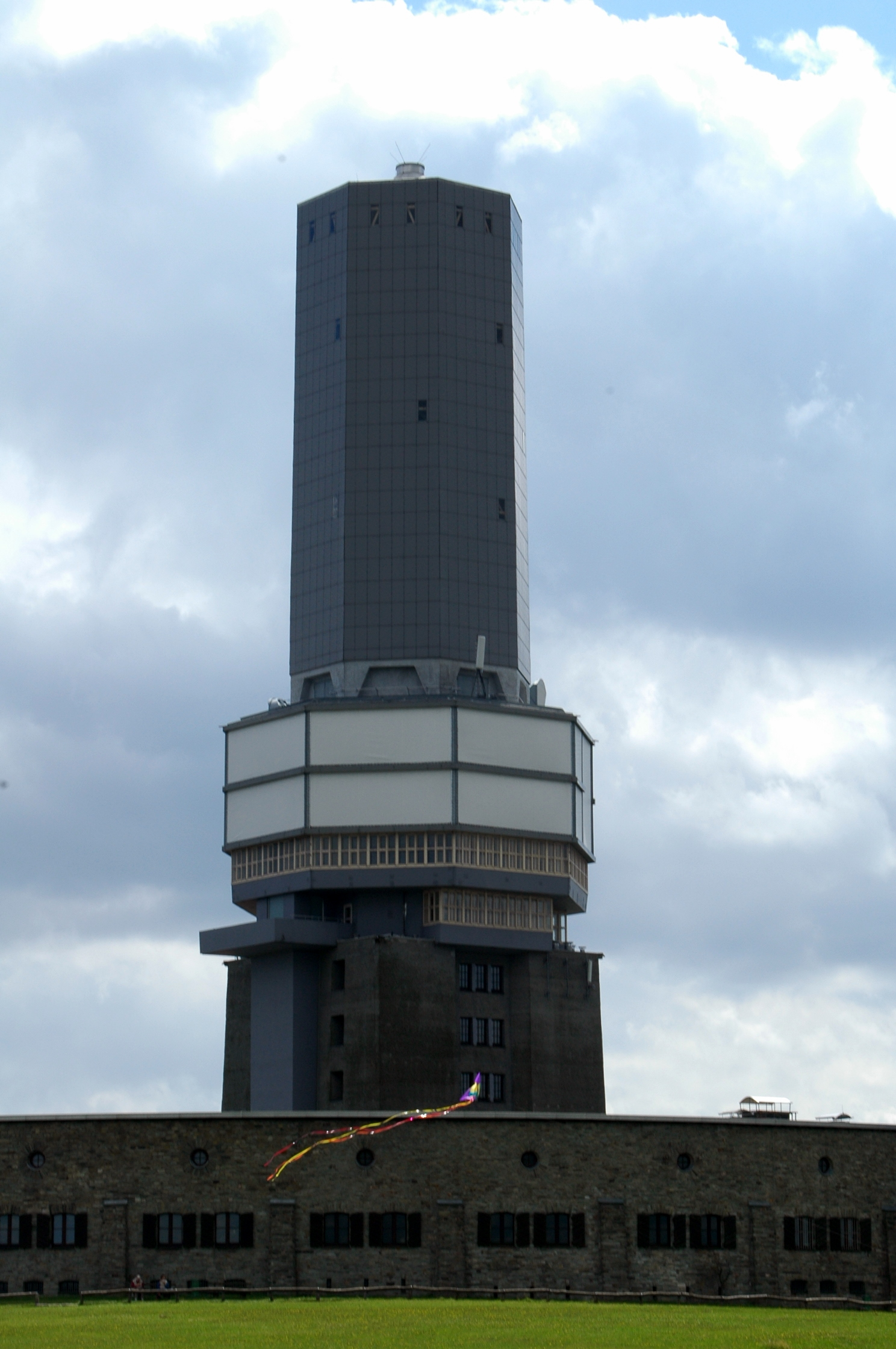
The telecommunication tower

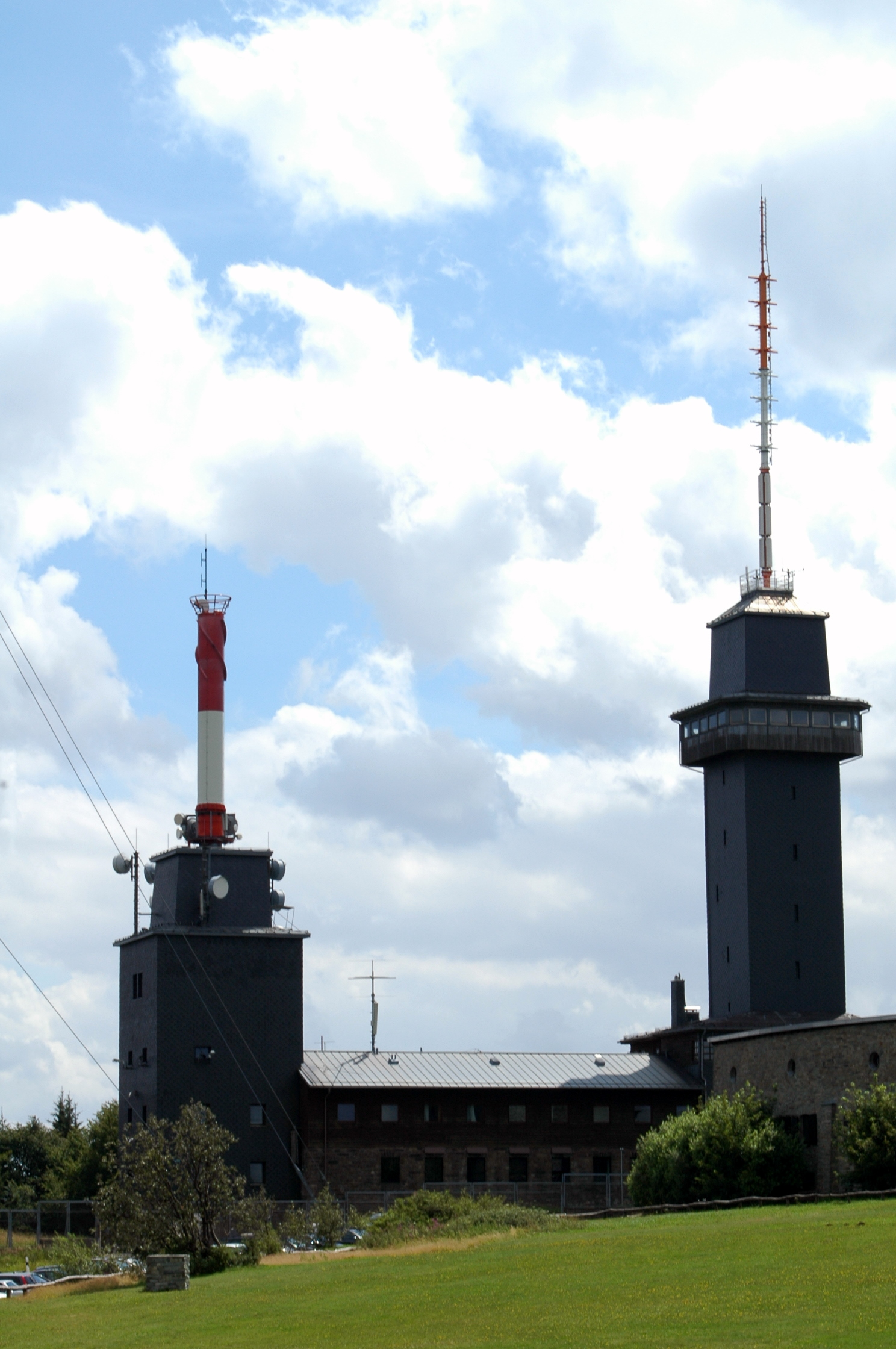
The observation tower and a backup tower

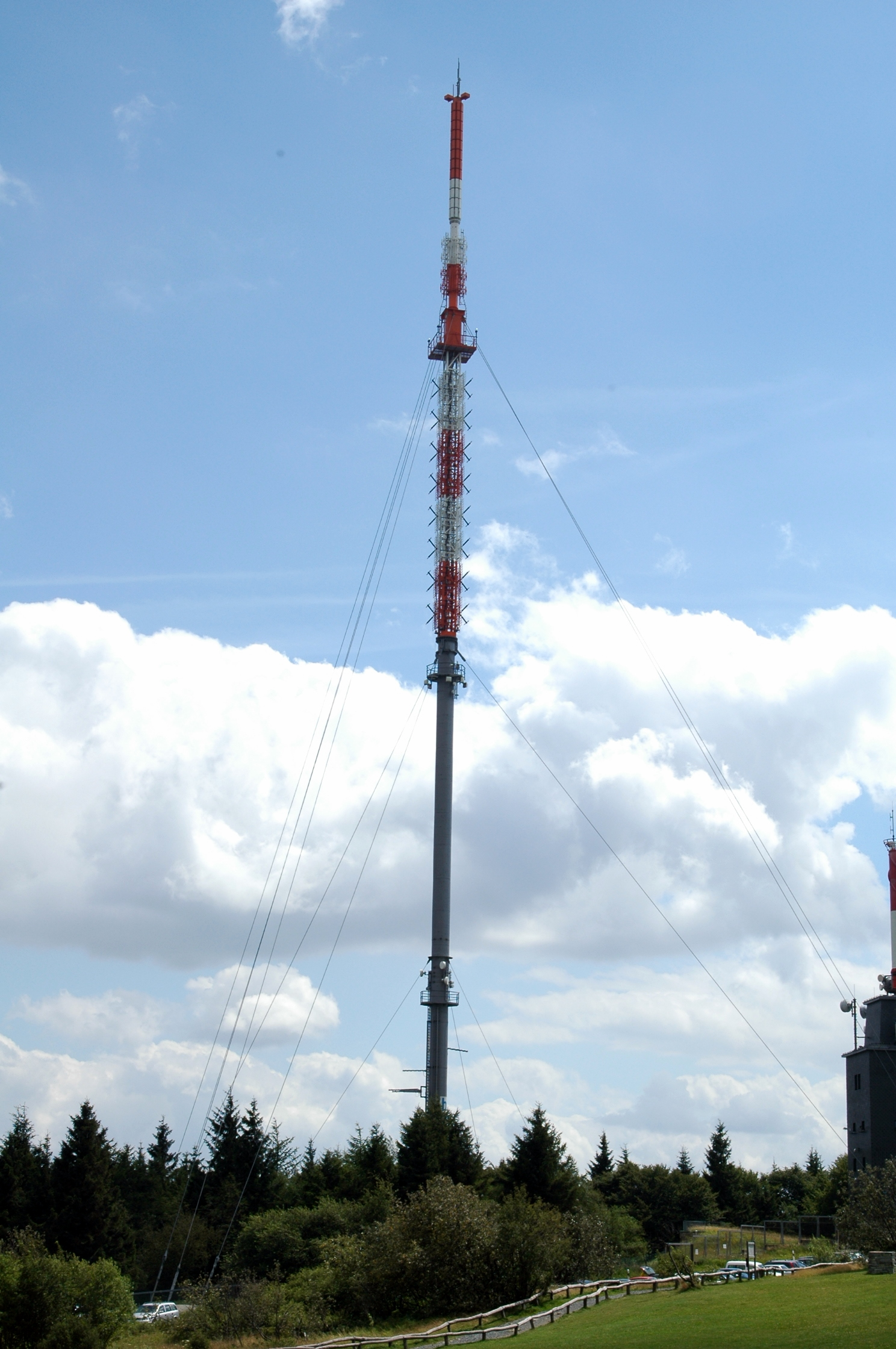
The guyed mast

This tower was built in 1937 as a 53-metre-tall (174 ft) reinforced concrete construction with an upper section built of wood. Intended as a television tower for the Rhine Main Area, it became a radar station during World War II. Before the end of World War II, the tower was heavily damaged by bombs, and the structure burned down.

In 1950, reconstruction of the tower was started. The lower 5 floors were reused in the 21.20-metre-high (69.6 ft) reinforced concrete base. On these a 17.65-metre-tall (57.9 ft) structural steel framework with 5 floors was set up. This carried a 30.28-metre-tall (99.3 ft) timber construction with 9 floors, so that the tower (without the UHF antenna installed on the top) has a total height of 69.13 metres.

Since numerous directional antennas were set up, all connections of the wooden upper building had to be manufactured without metal.

== Present status ==
The tower is now a protected monument.

== See also ==
- List of towers
- List of masts
