= Avraham Pisarek =

German photographer

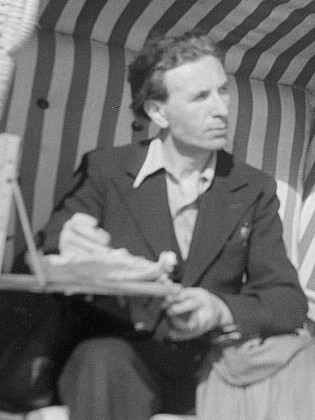
- Pisarek in 1946
- Born: 24 December 1901; Przedbórz, Congress Poland
- Died: 24 April 1983 (aged 81); West Berlin, West Germany
- Occupation: Photographer
- Known for: Photograph of Wilhelm Pieck and Otto Grotewohl shaking hands during the merger ceremony of the KPD and SPD

Avraham Pisarek (24 December 1901 in Przedbórz, Congress Poland – 24 April 1983 in West Berlin) was a German photographer of Polish-Jewish descent.

== Early life ==
Avraham Pisarek was the son of Jewish merchant Berek Pisarek and his wife Sara. He was born in Congress Poland, then part of the Russian Empire. He attended religious and middle school in Lodz. In 1918/1919, he moved to Germany, and worked in a factory in Herne. In 1924, Pisarek left Germany to travel to Mandatory Palestine as Khalutz (Pioneer) and worked there as a stonemason.

== Career ==
Four years later he returned to Germany after a short stay in France and settled in Berlin-Reinickendorf. There he completed a photographic education and worked as a photographer for image publishers and the Berlin theater community. His photos were published in Arbeiter-Illustrierte-Zeitung and in the Jewish press. In 1929, he joined the Reich Association of German Press. Pisarek's contacts with the KPD resulted in a collaboration with John Heartfield. He became a member of the Photography Group Berlin-Nord. As a friend of Max Liebermann, he frequented circles of artists and writers of the Weimar Republic.

Pisarek was officially banned from working in the mainstream press after the seizure of power by the National Socialists in 1933. He was thereafter allowed to work only for the Jewish community. In 1936, he, his non-Jewish wife Gerda and their two children Georg and Ruth were expelled from their Reinickendorf apartment. They moved to Oranienburger Straße in Berlin-Mitte.

He worked as a photographer until 1941 for Jewish newspapers as well as for the Jewish Cultural Association of Berlin (where he photographed, among others, the pianist Grete Sultan). During this time, among other things, he took the only photos of Liebermann's funeral. In addition, he participated in (illegal) anti-fascist work, which led to repeated arrests and summonses to the Gestapo. After the final dissolution of all Jewish organizations in Germany in 1941, Pisarek was unemployed. He was drafted for forced labor and was inter alia used as an interpreter for Polish and Soviet forced laborers. An emigration to the United States failed. He survived the Nazi rule thanks to the Rosenstraße protest. In May 1944, his apartment burned down.

=== Postwar ===
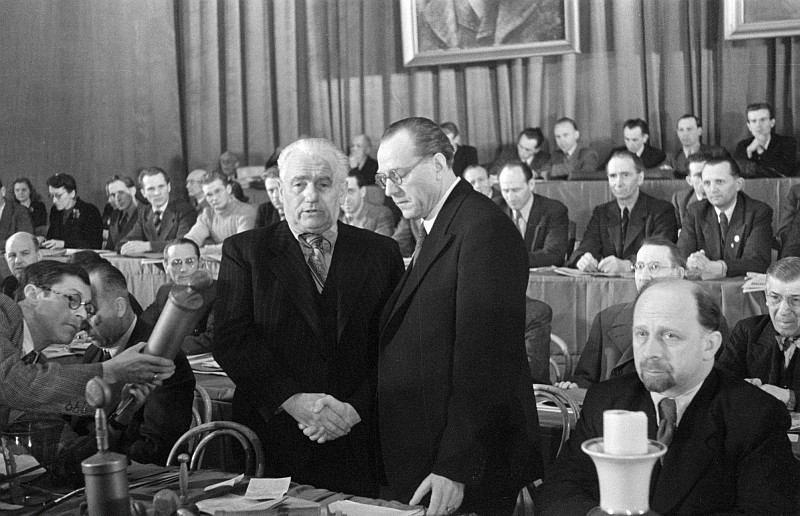
Photograph of the unification congress of the SED taken by Pisarek

After the war, he worked as an interpreter for the Soviet Military Administration in Germany. He resumed his activities as a reporter and in this way documented the "anti-fascist-democratic revolution" in the Soviet occupation zone and the founding of the (communist) German Democratic Republic (GDR). The photo series of the handshake of Otto Grotewohl and Wilhelm Pieck at the foundation congress of the SED, in which the SPD and KPD parties merged to form the SED, is one of his most famous works. Numerous artist portraits, for example, those of Helene Weigel, Thomas Mann and Hanns Eisler, were created during this time. At the end of the 1950s, Pisarek turned almost exclusively to theater photography. Pisarek died in West Berlin in 1983.

His photographic works are part of several archives, such as the German Photographic Library, the theatrical collections of the Foundation Stadtmuseum Berlin, the Foundation Archive of the Academy of Arts, the photo agencies and-images and ullstein bild, and the image archive of Cultural Heritage.
