= Federation of German-American Clubs =

- Verband der Deutsch-Amerikanischen Clubs / Federation of German-American Clubs e.V.
- Founded: 1948
- Founded at: Bad Kissingen
- Type: Nonprofit organization, Umbrella organization
- Headquarters: Wiesbaden
- Members: 18 Clubs
- Key people: Klaus-Jochen Gühlcke (President), Swaantje Katz (Vice-President)
- Website: vdac.de

The Federation of German-American Clubs (Verband der Deutsch-Amerikanischen Clubs e.V., VDAC) was founded in 1948 and currently consists of 18 local clubs all over Germany. The Federation is committed to fostering cultural exchange and cooperation between the United States and Germany. Its projects include a student exchange and a youth program.

== History ==
In 1946, Merle A. Potter, a US-Army Captain, and Prince Louis Ferdinand von Preussen founded the "Bad Kissingen Cosmopolitan Club", the first German-American club, which then was closed again soon after the prohibition of fraternization took effect. Potter was ordered to Ansbach to work with the military government. After James F. Burch's famous "Restatement of Policy on Germany" speech in 1946, the prohibition of fraternization was overruled under military governor Lucius D. Clay. In the following year, Clay ordered that Potter would be founding various German-American clubs in the American sector.

In September 1947, Major Potter invited the newly founded German-American clubs to a first meeting in Heidelberg. Through a telegram, General Clay sent his regards to the delegates, expressing that "democracy can only grow through friendship, understanding and discussion, and the military government supports the meeting of leading American and German individuals". In June 1948 the second conference took place in Bad Kissingen. 17 clubs, including 2 women's clubs, attended. The foundation of a head organization, named "Federation of German-American Social Discussion Clubs", was decided.

At another meeting in Munich in May 1949, the organization was renamed Federation of German-American Clubs (Verband der Deutsch-Amerikanischen Clubs). This term has been used to the present day. In 1957, the student exchange program "A Bridge Across the Ocean" was started. Its purpose was to intensify the cultural exchange between the young generations in Germany and the United States. In 1958, another youth exchange program was introduced as a new project, giving school students between the ages of 14 and 18 a chance to visit Germany or the United States.

In 1980, the Federation granted the "Lucius D. Clay-Medal" to John Jay McCloy. The Medal since has been awarded annually to individuals that have contributed to German-American Friendship. As of today, the Federation consists of 18 clubs and has offices in Washington, New York and San Francisco.

== Projects ==
=== Student exchange ===
Since its beginnings in 1957, the student exchange has given more than 2,000 young Americans and Germans the chance to participate in academic exchange. Annually, about 25 German students go to the US, while about 25 American students come to Germany. 19 American and 22 German universities participate in the Program. The VDAC Alumni e.V. gives the returnees a network and the chance to get involved even after their exchange ended.

=== Youth program ===
Since 1958 the youth program is an essential part of the Federation's projects. For young people between the age of 14 and 18, seminars and trips, the so-called "home stay-program", are being organized. The goal is to develop a sense of understanding and tolerance through cultural exchange.

=== VDAC magazine Gazette ===
The Gazette regularly publishes information and news regarding the German-American clubs. The Gazette is the official news platform of the Federation.

=== German-American Day ===
The German-American Day annually honors German-American relations by granting the Lucius D. Clay-Medal to individuals that contributed to German-American understanding. In the past, medals went to Angela Merkel, Hans-Dietrich Genscher and Thomas Reiter for example.

== Honorary Board ==
The following individuals are members of the honorary board of the Federation of German-American Clubs:

- Horst Seehofer, Prime Minister of Bavaria
- John B. Emerson, US-Ambassador to the Federal Republic of Germany
- Juergen Hardt, coordinator for transatlantic relations of the German government
- Georg Friedrich Prinz von Preussen (Prinzessin Kira von Preussen Foundation)
- Werner Weidenfeld (Center for Applied Policy Research)
- Fred B. Irwin (Honorary President of the American Chamber of Commerce in Germany)
