= List of United States Army Military Police Corps units =

The following is a list of units within the United States Army Military Police Corps, with their Distinctive unit insignia.

Separate Commands
Unit	SSI/DUI	Subordinate to	Component
United States Army Criminal Investigation Command		United States Army Provost Marshal General	Active Duty
United States Army Corrections Command		United States Army Provost Marshal General	Active Duty

Military Police Commands & Brigades
Unit	SSI/DUI	Subordinate to	Component
46th Military Police Command, in Lansing (MI)		Michigan Army National Guard	National Guard
200th Military Police Command, at Fort Meade (MD): 11th Military Police Brigade; 290th Military Police Brigade; 300th Military Police Brigade; 333rd Military Police Brigade		United States Army Reserve	Reserve
260th Military Police Command		District of Columbia National Guard	Deactivated
8th Military Police Brigade, at Schofield Barracks (HI): 728th Military Police Battalion, at Schofield Barracks (HI); 58th Military Police Company; 552nd Military Police Company		United States Army Pacific	Active Duty
11th Military Police Brigade, in Los Alamitos (CA): 96th Military Police Battalion (I/R) (EPW/CI), in Fallbrook (CA); 324th Military Police Battalion (I/R) (EPW/CI), in Fresno (CA); 387th Military Police Battalion (CS), in Glendale (AZ); 390th Military Police Battalion (CS), at Joint Base Lewis–McChord (WA); 393rd Military Police Battalion (CID), in Bell (CA); 607th Military Police Battalion (CS), in Grand Prairie (TX)		200th Military Police Command	Reserve
14th Military Police Brigade, at Fort Leonard Wood (MO): 701st Military Police Battalion, at Fort Leonard Wood (MO); 787th Military Police Battalion, at Fort Leonard Wood (MO); 795th Military Police Battalion, at Fort Leonard Wood (MO)		Military Police School	Active Duty (TDA)
15th Military Police Brigade, at Fort Leavenworth (KS): 40th Military Police Battalion (I/R), at Fort Leavenworth (KS); 705th Military Police Battalion (I/R), at Fort Leavenworth (KS)		Fort Leavenworth, KS	Active Duty
16th Military Police Brigade, at Fort Bragg (NC: 91st Military Police Battalion, at Fort Drum (NY); 23rd Military Police Company; 227th Military Police Detachment; 511th Military Police Company; 563rd Military Police Company; 642nd Engineer Support Company; 385th Military Police Battalion, at Fort Stewart (GA); 139th Military Police Company; 197th Military Police Detachment; 293rd Military Police Company; 546th Military Police Company; 549th Military Police Company; 93rd Military Working Dog Detachment; 503rd Military Police Battalion (Airborne), at Fort Bragg (NC); 21st Military Police Company (Airborne); 65th Military Police Company (Airborne); 108th Military Police Company (Airborne); 550th Military Working Dog Detachment; 716th Military Police Battalion, at Fort Campbell (KY); 163rd Military Police Detachment; 194th Military Police Company; 218th Military Police Company; 551st Military Police Company; 561st Military Police Company		XVIII Airborne Corps / Fort Bragg	Active Duty
18th Military Police Brigade, in Grafenwoehr (Germany): 709th Military Police Battalion, in Grafenwoehr; 92nd Military Police Company, in Kaiserslautern and Baumholder; 527th Military Police Company, in Hohenfels and Ansbach; 529th Military Police Company, in Wiesbaden and Vicenza, and at Camp Darby; 554th Military Police Company, in Stuttgart; 615th Military Police Company, in Vilseck; US Army Correctional Activity - Europe, in Mannheim		21st Theater Sustainment Command / USAREUR	Active Duty
35th Military Police Brigade, in Lemay (MO): 175th Military Police Battalion, in Columbia (MO); 1139th Military Police Company, in Kansas City (MO); 3175th Military Police Company, in Warrenton (MO); 205th Military Police Battalion, in Jefferson City (MO); 1137th Military Police Company, in Kennett (MO); 1138th Military Police Company, in West Plains (MO); 1175th Military Police Company, in Saint Clair (MO)		Missouri Army National Guard	National Guard
42nd Military Police Brigade, at Joint Base Lewis–McChord (WA): 504th Military Police Battalion, at Joint Base Lewis–McChord (WA); 51st Military Police Detachment; 54th Military Police Company; 66th Military Police Company; 170th Military Police Company; 571st Military Police Company; 508th Military Police Battalion (I/R), at Joint Base Lewis–McChord (WA); 67th Military Police Company; 595th Military Police Company		I Corps	Active Duty
43rd Military Police Brigade, in Warwick (RI): 118th Military Police Battalion, in Warwick (RI); 115th Military Police Company, in East Greenwich (RI); 169th Military Police Company, in Warren (RI)		Rhode Island Army National Guard	National Guard
49th Military Police Brigade, in Fairfield (CA): 185th Military Police Battalion, in Pittsburg (CA); 40th Military Police Company; 270th Military Police Company; 330th Military Police Company; 649th Military Police Company; 670th Military Police Company; 870th Military Police Company		California Army National Guard	National Guard
89th Military Police Brigade, at Fort Hood (TX): 93rd Military Police Battalion, at Fort Bliss (TX); 72nd Military Police Detachment; 202nd Military Police Company; 212th Military Police Company; 591st Military Police Company; 978th Military Police Company; 97th Military Police Battalion, at Fort Riley (KS); 73rd Military Police Detachment; 116th Military Police Company; 252nd Military Police Detachment, at Fort Leonard Wood (MO); 287th Military Police Company; 300th Military Police Company; 977th Military Police Company; 720th Military Police Battalion, at Fort Hood (TX); 64th Military Police Company; 401st Military Police Company; 410th Military Police Company; 411th Military Police Company; 759th Military Police Battalion, at Fort Carson (CO); 59th Military Police Company; 110th Military Police Company; 127th Military Police Company; 148th Military Police Detachment; 984th Military Police Company		III Corps	Active Duty
142nd Military Police Brigade, in Decatur (AL): 203rd Military Police Battalion, in Athens (AL)			National Guard
177th Military Police Brigade, in Taylor (MI): 210th Military Police Battalion, in Taylor (MI); 46th Military Police Company, in Corunna (MI); 1775th Military Police Company, in Pontiac (MI); 1776th Military Police Company, in Taylor (MI)		Michigan Army National Guard	National Guard
220th Military Police Brigade			Deactivated
221st Military Police Brigade (formerly San Jose, CA)		Assigned to Sixth Army	Deactivated (USAR 1959-1994)
258th Military Police Brigade			Reorganized and redesignated
290th Military Police Brigade, in Nashville (TN): 160th Military Police Battalion (I/R) (EPW/CI), in Tallahassee (FL); 304th Military Police Battalion (I/R) (EPW/CI), in Nashville (TN); 317th Military Police Battalion (CS), in Tampa (FL); 535th Military Police Battalion (I/R) (EPW/CI), in Cary (NC); 724th Military Police Battalion (I/R) (EPW/CI), in Fort Lauderdale (FL); 733rd Military Police Battalion (CID), at Fort Gillem (GA)		200th Military Police Command	Reserve
300th Military Police Brigade, in Inkster (MI): 159th Military Police Battalion (CID), in Terre Haute (IN); 327th Military Police Battalion (I/R) (EPW/CI), in Arlington Heights (IL); 384th Military Police Battalion (I/R) (EPW/CI), in Fort Wayne (IN); 391st Military Police Battalion (I/R) (EPW/CI), in Columbus (OH); 530th Military Police Battalion (I/R) (EPW/CI), in Elkhorn (NE); 785th Military Police Battalion (I/R) (EPW/CI), in Fraser (MI)		200th Military Police Command	Reserve
333rd Military Police Brigade, in Farmingdale (NY): 310th Military Police Battalion (I/R) (EPW/CI), in Farmingdale (NY); 336th Military Police Battalion (CS), in Pittsburgh (PA); 340th Military Police Battalion (I/R) (EPW/CI), in Ashley (PA); 382nd Military Police Battalion (CS), at Westover Air Reserve Base (MA); 400th Military Police Battalion (I/R) (EPW/CI), at Fort Meade (MD)		200th Military Police Command	Reserve
Military Police Command Panama: HHC LEA "Law and order south of the border".			Deactivated
Military Police Brigade Hawaii			Deactivated

Separate Military Police Battalions
Unit	DUI	Subordinate to	Component
94th Military Police Battalion, at Camp Humphreys (South Korea): 55th Military Police Company, at Camp Casey); 142nd Military Police Company, at Yongsan Garrison; 188th Military Police Company, at Camp Carroll; 557th Military Police Company, at Camp Humphreys; United States Army Correctional Activity Korea, at Camp Humphreys		19th Expeditionary Sustainment Command / Eighth US Army / United States Forces Korea	Active Duty
525th Military Police Battalion, at Guantanamo Bay (Cuba)		Joint Detention Group / Joint Task Force Guantanamo / United States Southern Command	Active Duty
102nd Military Police Battalion, in Auburn (NY): 105th Military Police Company; 107th Military Police Company; 222nd Military Police Company		New York Army National Guard / 53rd Troop Command	National Guard
104th Military Police Battalion, in Kingston (NY): 442nd Military Police Company; 727th Military Police Detachment		New York Army National Guard / 53rd Troop Command	National Guard
372nd Military Police Battalion: 273rd Military Police Company; 274th Military Police Company; 275th Military Police Company; 276th Military Police Company		District of Columbia National Guard	National Guard
437th Military Police Battalion, in Columbus (OH): 135th Military Police Company, in Chagrin Falls (OH); 323rd Military Police Company, in Toledo (OH); 324th Military Police Company, in Middletown (OH); 583rd Military Police Company, in North Canton (OH); 585th Military Police Company, in Marysville (OH); 838th Military Police Company, in Youngstown (OH)		Ohio Army National Guard / 73rd Troop Command	National Guard
519th Military Police Battalion, at Fort Polk (LA): 91st Military Police Detachment; 204th Military Police Company; 258th Military Police Company		Joint Readiness Training Center	Active Duty
850th Military Police Battalion, in Phoenix (AZ): 855th Military Police Company, in Phoenix (AZ); 856th Military Police Company, at Camp Navajo (AZ); 860th Military Police Company, in Tucson (AZ)		Arizona Army National Guard	National Guard
192nd Military Police Battalion, in Niantic (CT): 143rd Military Police Company (CS), in West Hartford (CT); 643rd Military Police Company (Guard), in Westbrook (CT); 11th, 119th and 928th Military Working Dog Detachments, in Newtown (CT)		Connecticut Army National Guard	National Guard
170th Military Police Battalion, in Decatur (GA): 178th Military Police Company (CS), in Monroe (GA); 179th Military Police Company (CS), in Savannah (GA); 190th Military Police Company (Guard), in Kennesaw (GA)		Georgia Army National Guard	National Guard
51st Military Police Battalion, in Florence (SC): 132nd Military Police Company (CS), in West Columbia (SC); 133rd Military Police Company (CS), in Timmonsville (SC)		South Carolina Army National Guard / 59th Troop Command	National Guard
773rd Military Police Battalion, at Camp Beauregard (LA): 2228th Military Police Company (CS), at Camp Beauregard (LA); 239th Military Police Company (CS), in Carville (LA); 39th Military Police Company (CS), at Camp Minden Training Site (LA)		Louisiana Army National Guard / 139th Regional Support Group	National Guard
745th Military Police Detachment (L&O), in Mustang (OK)		Oklahoma Army National Guard / 90th Troop Command	National Guard
