= 290th Brigade =

290th Brigade may refer to:

- 290th Brigade, Royal Field Artillery, United Kingdom
- 290th Military Police Brigade, United States
