= Adolph McQueen =

United States Army general

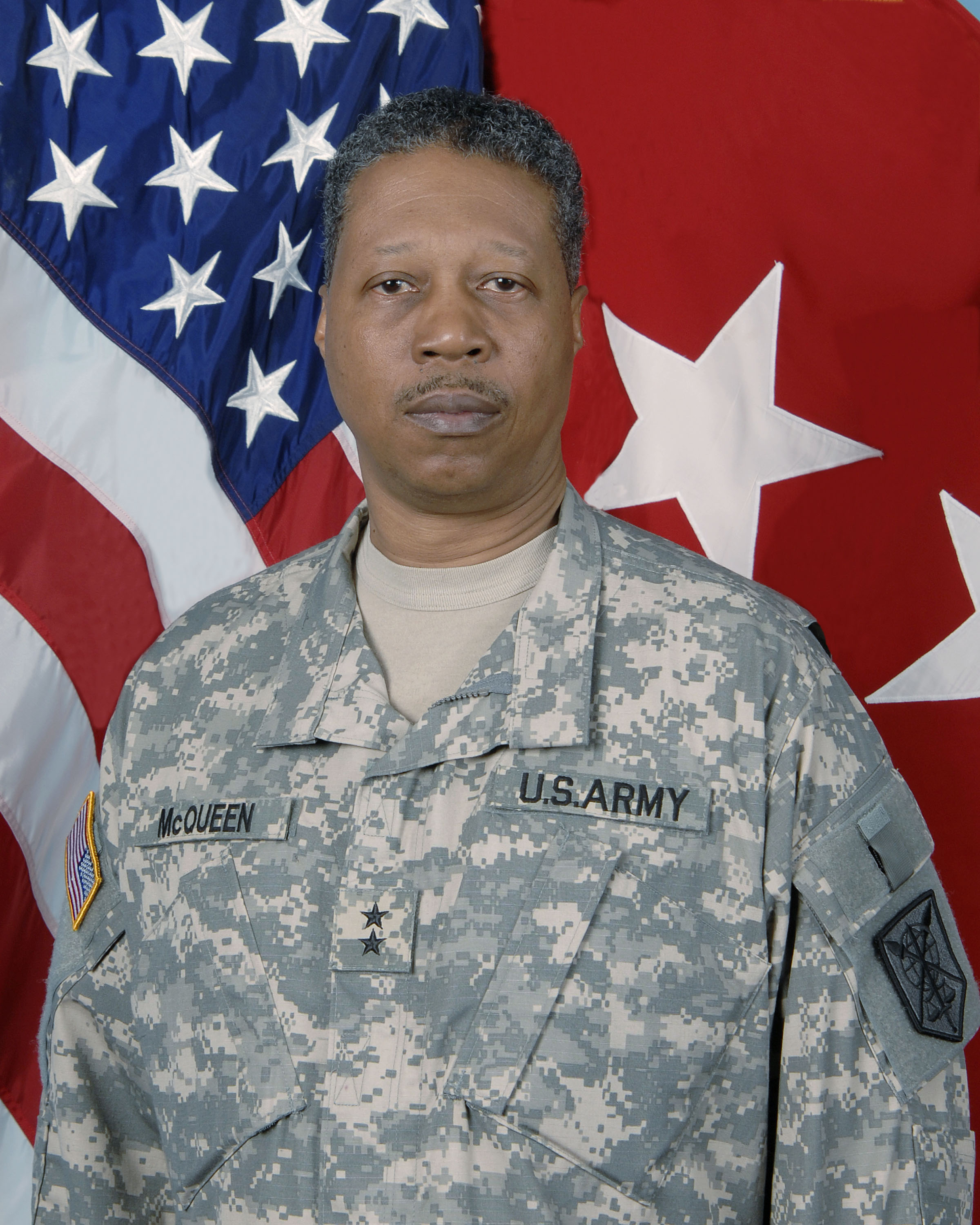
- MG Adolph McQueen
- Military career
- Allegiance: United States of America
- Branch: United States Army
- Service years: 1971 - 2013
- Rank: Major general
- Awards: Distinguished Service Medal (2); Defense Meritorious Service Medal; Legion of Merit

Adolph McQueen Jr. is a retired United States Army officer who ultimately attained the rank of major general.

== Military career ==
McQueen first enlisted in the United States Marine Corps, in 1971. Eleven years later, in 1982, he received a direct commission into the United States Army. He graduated from Wayne State University with a bachelor's degree in Criminal Justice and earned a master's degree in Strategic Studies from the United States Army War College.

McQueen's military education included: Command and General Staff Officer Course, Associate Logistics Executive Development Course, Adjutant General Officer Branch Qualification Course, Military Police Officer Advanced Course, and the Quartermaster Officer Advanced Course.

=== First commander, Joint Detention Group, Guantanamo ===
In 2002, when he was a colonel, he was the first commander of Joint Detention Group, responsible for Joint Task Force Guantanamo's guard force.

James Yee, the Guantanamo Bay detention camps' first Muslim chaplain, reported to McQueen. In his book For God and country: faith and patriotism under fire, Yee reported an escalating series of problems, including the role McQueen played.

In 2003 BBC News reporters described McQueen personally curtailing their tour of Guantanamo when captives were allowed to see them, and called out to them. The BBC crew was sent home the next day, while other journalists were allowed to stay, and continue reporting.

=== 11th Military Police Brigade ===
Following his service at Guantanamo Bay, McQueen commanded the 11th Military Police Brigade in Hanover, Pennsylvania from 2005 to 2007.

=== 200th Military Police Command ===
By 2010, McQueen was a major general in command of the 200th Military Police Command based out of Fort George G. Meade, Maryland.

=== U.S. Army North ===
In 2012, McQueen was assigned as the Deputy Commander of United States Army North. He served in this position until his retirement in September 2013. He received the Distinguished Service Medal at his retirement ceremony.

=== Awards ===
McQueen's military awards include: Army Distinguished Service Medal with oak leaf cluster; Defense Superior Service Medal; Legion of Merit; Defense Meritorious Service Medal; Meritorious Service Medal (with four Oak Leaf Clusters); Joint Service Commendation Medal; Army Commendation Medal (with two Oak Leaf Clusters); Army Achievement Medal (with one Oak Leaf Cluster); and Army Staff Identification Badge.

== Civilian career ==
McQueen worked in civilian law enforcement for more than 30 years, to include an assignment as the Special Agent Supervisor with the Michigan Department of the Attorney General.
