= 220th Brigade =

220th Brigade may refer to:

- 220th Brigade (United Kingdom)
- 220th Brigade, Royal Field Artillery, United Kingdom
- 220th Military Police Brigade, United States
