= William H. Steele (United States Army officer) =

Former Lieutenant Colonel William H. Steele (born c. 1955) is a former U.S. Army Reservist from Prince George, Virginia. He was charged with aiding the enemy and other breaches of military law, mostly in connection with his role as commander of the 451st Military Police Detachment and Camp Cropper, a holding facility for security detainees in Iraq. He was acquitted of aiding the enemy, but sentenced to 2 years confinement on other charges and was dismissed from the military. He was confined at the United States Disciplinary Barracks at Fort Leavenworth, Kansas. Steele was only the second officer to be charged with aiding the enemy during Operation Iraqi Freedom, the other being Captain James Yee. William H. Steele was the only field-grade officer to be charged with aiding the enemy during all of Operation Iraqi Freedom.

== Biography ==
=== Background ===
Steele is originally from Frostburg, Maryland and a 1973 graduate of Beall High School. He is a former police officer from Anne Arundel County, Maryland and a former Hernando County, Florida sheriff’s deputy.

=== Civilian legal incidents ===
After Steele was charged with aiding the enemy, the press reported on two earlier incidents in which Steele had been involved with the courts. In November 1993, he was charged with felony aggravated child abuse for his verbal and physical abuse of his 11-year-old stepson. From court records, "[The boy] was punched. He was thrown across the room for eating food without asking." Steele was also charged with resisting an officer with violence, another felony. Both charges were dropped when he agreed to give up custody.

In 2003, Steele was charged with two misdemeanor offenses during a dispute with a contractor. The contractor, who was born in Lebanon, accused Steele of saying: "You better get out of here or I'll blow your head off," and said that Steele "accused him of working for al-Qaeda". Steele was convicted on one count of threatening bodily harm, but upon appeal the charges were dismissed after Steele completed anger management therapy.

=== Camp Cropper ===
Steele served as commandant of Camp Cropper from October 2005 to the end of October 2006, when he transferred to Camp Victory and served as a senior patrol officer with 89th Military Police Brigade. Camp Cropper is known to have held former Baath Party members, Al-Qaeda operatives, and members of the Iraqi insurgency. On April 26, 2007, it was announced that Steele had been held in military detention since March, and that he had been charged with aiding the enemy and other violations of military law. After that he was held in pretrial confinement in Kuwait. Testimony at his Article 32 hearing indicated that the charge of aiding the enemy was based on the allegation that Steele had allowed three juvenile detainees to use his cellphone to call their parents in violation of the prison's requirement that all prisoner phone calls be monitored. (Steele had been previously reprimanded by Brigadier General Kevin McBride, commander of the 43rd MP Brigade, for "intimidating tower guards with a service pistol." He was later awarded the Bronze Star Medal by General McBride at the end of his tour of duty.)

On June 10, 2007, the military dropped charges of fraternization with the daughter of a prisoner, and failure to oversee expenditure of government funds—allegedly used to purchase of hair dye and Cuban cigars for Saddam Hussein when he was held at Camp Cropper. At that time, Major General James E. Simmons referred the remaining charges for trial by general court-martial. Steele was ordered confined pending trial. At a pre-trial hearing held at Camp Liberty, Iraq, on October 7, Steele pleaded guilty to two charges relating to improper storage of classified materials and to one of possession of pornographic videos. Steele's trial before a military judge on charges of "aiding the enemy, possessing classified information, disobeying orders and conduct unbecoming an officer" began in Baghdad on October 15.

On October 19, 2007, a military judge found Steele not guilty on the charge of aiding the enemy, but guilty of "unauthorized possession of classified documents, behavior unbecoming an officer for an inappropriate relationship with an interpreter and failing to obey an order". Steele was sentenced to 2 years confinement (of a possible maximum 6-year sentence for the charges to which he had previously plead guilty, as well as an additional 10 years for the charges for which he was convicted), credited with time served, loss of his military retirement, forfeiture of pay and allowances, and dismissal from the military.

== Charges against Steele ==
=== Charge I: Violation of the UCMJ, Article 104 ===
Specification: In that Lieutenant Colonel William H. Steele, did, between on or about October 1, 2005 and October 31, 2006, aid the enemy by providing an unmonitored cellular phone to detainees. (Acquitted of charge on October 19, 2007)

=== Charge II: Violation of the UCMJ, Article 134 ===
Specification: In that Lieutenant Colonel William H. Steele, did, between on or about October 31, 2006 and February 22, 2007, having unauthorized possession of classified information, violate Title 18, United States Code, Section 793(e), by knowingly and willfully retaining the same and failing to deliver it to the officer or employee of the United States entitled to receive it. (Convicted of charge on October 19, 2007)

=== Charge III: Violation of the UCMJ, Article 133 ===
Specification 1: In that Lieutenant Colonel William H. Steele, did, between on or about October 20, 2005 and February 22, 2007, knowingly and wrongfully fraternize with the daughter of a detainee, wherein such acts constituted conduct unbecoming an officer in the armed forces. (This specification was not recommended for trial by court-martial and was dismissed on June 10, 2007.)

Specification 2: In that Lieutenant Colonel William H. Steele, did, between on or about December 1, 2005 and December 11, 2006, knowingly and wrongfully provide special privileges to and maintain an inappropriate relationship with an interpreter, wherein such acts constituted conduct unbecoming an officer in the armed forces. (Convicted of charge on October 19, 2007)

=== Charge IV: Violation of the UCMJ, Article 92 ===
Specification 1: In that Lieutenant Colonel William H. Steele, did, between on or about February 18, 2007 and February 21, 2007, violate a lawful general regulation, to wit: paragraph 7–4, Army Regulation 380–5, dated September 29, 2000, by wrongfully and knowingly storing classified information in his living space. (Steele pleaded guilty to this specification on October 7, 2007.)

Specification 2: In that Lieutenant Colonel William H. Steele, did, between on or about September 1, 2006 and February 21, 2007, violate a lawful general regulation, to wit: paragraph 4–32, Army Regulation 380–5, dated September 29, 2000, by improperly marking classified information. (Steele pleaded guilty to this specification on October 7, 2007.)

Specification 3: In that Lieutenant Colonel William H. Steele, having knowledge of a lawful order issued by the 89th Military Police Brigade Deputy Commander, did, at or near Camp Victory, Iraq, on or about February 22, 2007, failure to obey the same. (Convicted of charge on October 19, 2007)

Specification 4: In that Lieutenant Colonel William H. Steele, did, between on or about February 18, 2007 and February 21, 2007, violate a lawful general order, to wit: paragraph 2e, Multi-National Corps-Iraq General Order Number 1, dated December 16, 2006, by wrongfully and knowingly possessing pornographic video files. (Steele pleaded guilty to this specification on October 7, 2007.)

Specification 5: In that Lieutenant Colonel William H. Steele, between on or about October 1, 2005 and October 31, 2006, was derelict in the performance of his duties in that he willfully failed to fulfill his obligations as an approving authority in the expenditure of Field Ordering Officer funds. (This specification was not recommended for trial by court-martial and was dismissed on June 10, 2007.)
