= 93d Military Police Battalion =

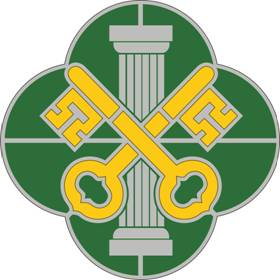
- 93d Military Police Battalion Distinctive Unit Insignia
- Active: June 1945 - November 1945 October 1951 - March 1953; June 1966 - December 1971; October 1986 - November 1992 November 2007 - Present
- Country: United States
- Branch: Army
- Type: Military Police
- Part of: 1st Armored Division Sustainment Brigade
- Garrison/HQ: Fort Bliss
- Nickname: "War Eagle"
- Mottos: Strike Hard, Strike Fast!
- Engagements: World War II Korean War; Vietnam War; War on terrorism: Iraq War; Operation Iraqi Freedom; Operation Enduring Freedom
- Decorations: Meritorious Unit Commendation (2), Republic of Korea Presidential Unit Citation (2), Republic of Vietnam Cross of Gallantry with Palm (1), Republic of Vietnam Civil Actions Unit Citation, First Class (1)

Commanders
- Current commander: LTC Samantha R. Hoxha
- Current CSM: CSM Marcus Mitchell
- Notable commanders: Donald J. Ryder,

The 93d (or 93rd) Military Police Battalion of the United States Army was formed in June 1945 and has operated in World War II, the Korean and Vietnam wars, the Gulf War, and the Iraq War.

== Mission ==
The 93d Military Police Battalion deploys worldwide to conduct Military Police operations, and continuous law and order operations in support of the Fort Bliss military community.

== Organization ==
The battalion is subordinate to 89th Military Police Brigade. It numbers over 800 soldiers who are stationed at its headquarters at Fort Bliss, Texas.

The battalion consists of one Headquarters and Headquarters Detachment, one Law Enforcement Activities (LEA) Company, one Law Enforcement Detachment - the 513th Military Working Dog (MWD) detachment - and three Military Police Companies:

- 202nd Military Police Company
- 212th Military Police Company
- 978th Military Police Company

== History ==
=== World War II ===
Activated in France on 13 June 1945 in the towards the end of World War II, the unit served in France during the end of the war before being deactivated on 12 November 1945 in France.

=== Korean War ===
On 28 October 1951, the 93d MP BN was reactivated to serve in the Korean War.

=== Vietnam War ===
The 93d MP BN was reactivated at Fort Sill, Oklahoma on 1 June 1966 and deployed to South East Asia.

=== Operation Desert Storm ===
The 93d MP BN was reactivated in Germany on 16 October 1986 and deployed to South West Asia.

=== Operation Iraqi Freedom ===
The 93d MP BN was reactivated at Fort Bliss, Texas, on 17 November 2007, along with the 591st MP CO, and deployed to Iraq in January 2009.

To prepare for deployment, the 93d Commander worked to include their unit in NTC Rotation 09-01 alongside 1/1 CAV from FT Hood. The National Training Center (NTC), located in Fort Irwin, California, provides an effective opportunity for units to conduct realistic training with opposing forces (OPFORs), authentic role players, and professional observers/controllers (OCs) without any constraints. At the NTC, units are put to the test, making use of all systems required in combat. When the 93d Military Police Battalion from Fort Bliss, Texas, was deployed to support 1/1 Cavalry Division (CD) from Fort Hood, Texas, they were allowed to train at the NTC.

To prepare for Rotation 09-01, the 93d HHD conducted several rehearsals, including tactical operations center, digital staff, and division-level warfighter exercises with the 8th Military Police Brigade in Hawaii.

The 93d Military Police Battalion "War Eagles" conducted NTC Rotation 09-01 from 23 September to 30 October 2008 in conjunction with 1/1 CD (a heavy brigade combat team [HBCT]). The 93d deployed to the NTC with the headquarters and headquarters detachment [HHD] and the 591st Military Police Company from Fort Bliss, Texas.

According to the NTC Operations Group, the 93d was the first active duty or reserve component military police battalion HHD to conduct a rotation at the NTC.

The 93D Military Police Battalion was deployed to Iraq with 10 Active-Duty, Reserve, and Army National Guard MP Companies and 2 Air Force Security Forces units. The battalion consisted of over 1,800 Soldiers and Airmen who supported Multi-National Division-Baghdad. Their main task was to field and train 95 Police Transition teams, which subsequently trained over 15,000 Iraqi Policemen, including five Provincial and sixteen District-level Iraqi Chiefs of Police.

In August 2009, the 93D Military Police Battalion was assigned the additional duty of providing safety and security to the Iraqi International Zone, also known as the Green Zone. This led to a shift in focus towards Force Protection, Antiterrorism, and security transformation to support Green Zone security. The 93D was redeployed to FT BLiss in January 2010. For its performance during its deployment to Iraq, the 93d Military Police Battalion was awarded the Meritorious Unit Commendation.

In Oct. 2013, the 93D Military Police Battalion deployed to Guantanamo, Cuba, in support of Operation Enduring Freedom.
