= James Yee =

American former United States Army chaplain

James J. Yee
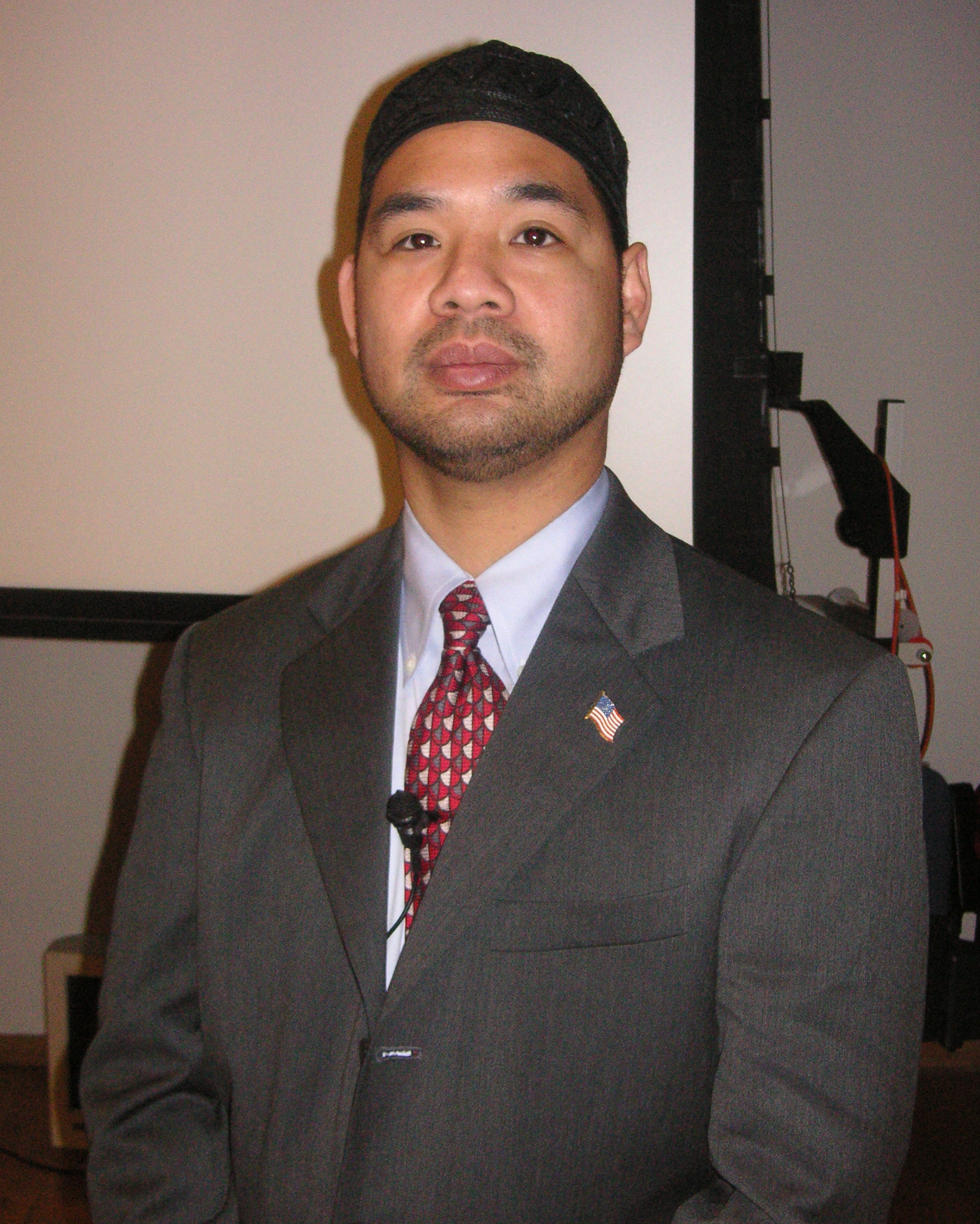
- Yee at Lancaster University, 2007
- Born: 1968 (age 57–58); New Jersey, U.S.
- Other name: Chinese: 余百康; Yusuf Yee (Arabic name)
- Occupation: Former US Army Chaplain
- Known for: Serving as the Muslim Chaplain for Muslim detainees held at the Guantánamo Bay detention camp, a U.S. prison camp in Guantanamo Bay, Cuba. Author, For God and Country.

James Joseph Yee (Chinese: 余百康 or 余优素福, also known by the Arabic name Yusuf Yee) (born c. 1968) is an American former United States Army chaplain with the rank of captain. He worked as a Muslim chaplain at Guantanamo Bay detention camp and was subjected to an intense investigation by the United States for espionage and other crimes, but all charges were later dropped. Yee later authored a book about his experiences as chaplain, For God and Country.

== Early life ==
Yee, a Chinese American, was born in New Jersey and raised in Springfield Township, where he attended Jonathan Dayton High School. Yee graduated from West Point in 1990. He converted to Islam in the early 1990s and studied religion in Syria, after which he obtained a letter of equivalency from Leesburg, Virginia's Graduate School of Islamic and Social Sciences, which enabled him to qualify for certification as a military chaplain.

== Career ==
=== Guantanamo ===
In his appointed role as chaplain, Yee ministered to Muslim detainees held at Guantánamo Bay detention camp and received commendation from his superiors for his work. When returning from duty at the Guantanamo Bay Naval Base, he was arrested on September 10, 2003, in Jacksonville, Florida, when a U.S. Customs agent found a list of Guantanamo detainees and interrogators among his belongings. He was charged with five offenses: sedition, aiding the enemy, spying, espionage, and failure to obey a general order. These charges were later reduced to mishandling classified information in addition to some minor charges. He was then transferred to a United States Navy brig in Charleston, South Carolina. The government did not name the country or entity for whom it suspected Yee was spying.

All court-martial charges against Yee were dropped on March 19, 2004, with Maj. Gen. Geoffrey Miller "citing national security concerns that would arise from the release of the evidence," and he was released to resume his duties. Yee was then accused of adultery and storing pornography on a government computer; and non-judicial punishment under Article 15, UCMJ was imposed. His appeal to General James T. Hill, Commander, United States Southern Command, was granted in April 2004. He left the US military with an honorable discharge in January 2005.

=== After Guantanamo ===
In October 2005 Yee published his book, For God and Country: Faith and Patriotism Under Fire. In it, Yee described an escalating series of problems, including the role he says was played by Adolph McQueen, then the commander of the Joint Detention Group. Yee wrote that he was kept in solitary confinement for seventy-six days, and that he was forced to undergo sensory deprivation. He also wrote that General Geoffrey Miller routinely incited the guards to hate the detainees. He alleges being told of mistreatment of prisoners. Yee argues that most of the detainees had little or no intelligence value about Osama bin Laden or al-Qaida's inner circle:

The people down in Guántanamo probably know as much about Osama bin Laden and al-Qaida as any private in the military would know what's going on inside the Pentagon.

In July 2006, Yee was stopped at the border while returning from a trip to Vancouver, British Columbia, to see Cirque du Soleil. It was Yee's first trip outside the U.S. since he was discharged from the army. He was detained at the border for 75 minutes. Yee commented, "Perhaps this is an indication I'm still of interest to the federal government."

On October 19, 2007, Syrian television broadcast its interview with Yee, in Arabic, where he discussed Koran desecration on the part of the U.S. military.

In December 2007, Yee made a statement on Australian Guantanamo Bay inmate David Hicks, who he regularly counselled while working at Guantanamo Bay. He said that he did not feel Hicks was a threat to Australia, and that "Any American soldier who has been through basic training has had 50 times more training than this guy."

Yee was a delegate to the 2008 Democratic National Convention from Washington's 9th congressional district, pledged to support Barack Obama.

Yee has spoken about what he witnessed at the U.S. Naval Base in Guantanamo Bay, Cuba, to audiences around the world.

== Personal ==
In 1991, Yee converted from Lutheran Christianity to Islam. Yee underwent religious training in Syria, where he met his wife Huda, a Palestinian. Yee is the father of a daughter, Sarah.
