= 333rd Military Police Brigade =

- Active: 1942-present
- Country: United States
- Branch: United States Army Reserve
- Role: Military Police
- Size: Brigade
- Part of: 200th Military Police Command (United States)
- Garrison/HQ: Farmingdale, NY
- Motto: Vires In Arduis (Strength In Difficulties)
- Website: https://www.facebook.com/333MPBDE/

Commanders
- Current commander: COL Stevens

Insignia
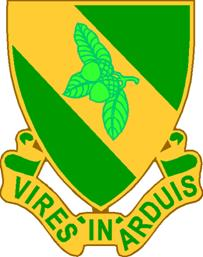
- 333rd Military Police Brigade DUI

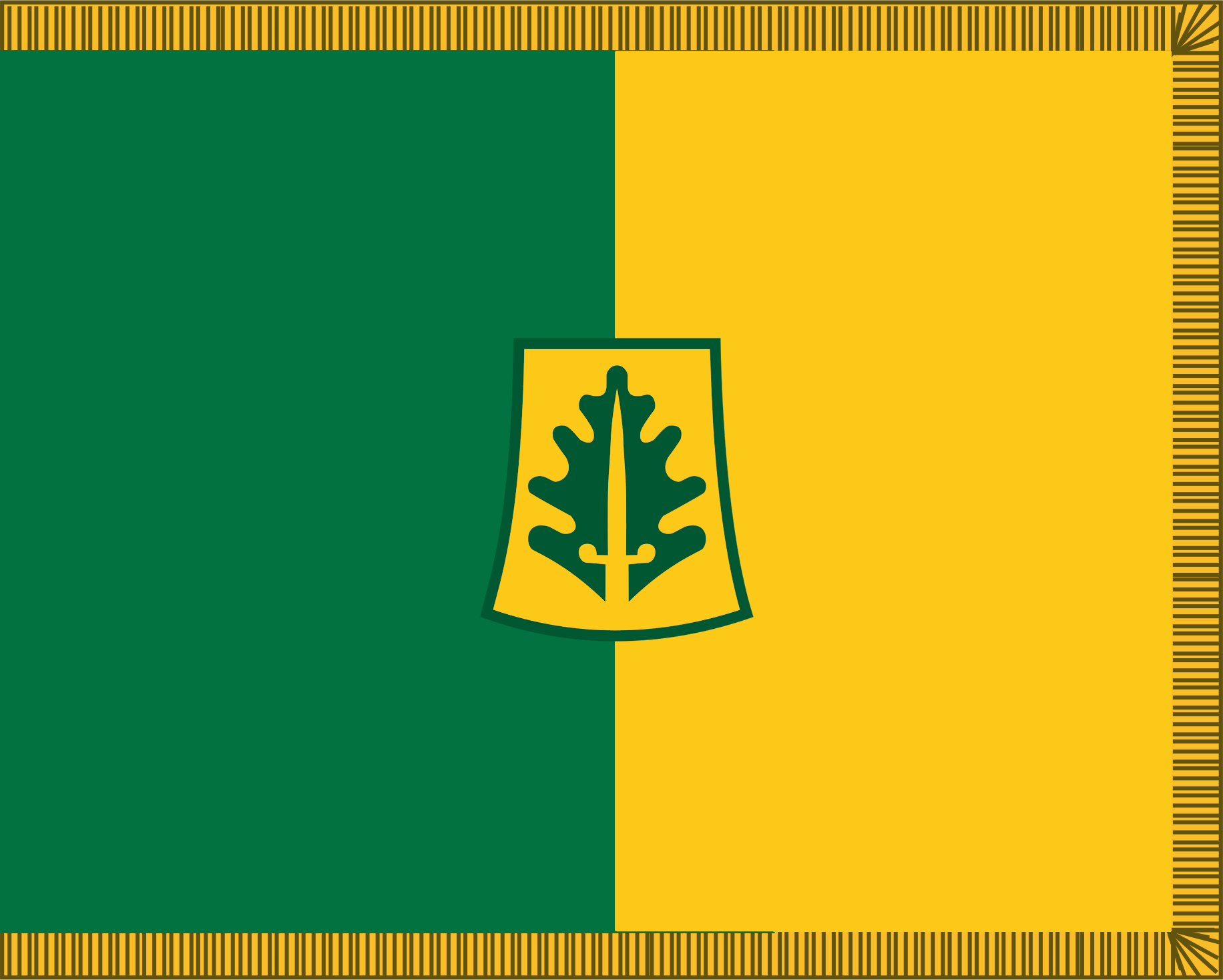
- 333rd Military Police Brigade Flag

The 333rd Military Police Brigade is a unit of the US Army Reserve assigned to the 200th Military Police Command. The unit was raised in 1942 in the Army of the United States as the 800th Military Police Battalion at Fort Ord, Calif. During World War II it earned campaign streamers in New Guinea and Luzon. It was inactive from 1947 to 1949 when it was reorganized as the 333rd Military Police Battalion in the reserves at Buffalo, NY as a part of First Army. It was moved to New York City in 1952 after a brief inactivation and redesignated as the 800th Military Police Battalion. In 1959, it was the HHD 800th Military Police Group and first moved to Garden City and later Hempstead, NY in 1966. In 1984, it became HHC 800th Military Police Brigade. Finally, in 2012 it became the 333rd Military Police Brigade.

The unit earned a Meritorious Unit Commendation in 2014.

== Organization ==
The brigade is a subordinate unit of the 200th Military Police Command. As of December 2025 the brigade consists of the following units:

- 333rd Military Police Brigade, in Farmingdale (NY)
  - Headquarters and Headquarters Company, in Farmingdale (NY)
  - 310th Military Police Battalion, in Farmingdale (NY)
    - Headquarters and Headquarters Company, in Farmingdale (NY)
    - 340th Military Police Company (General Support), at Fort Totten (NY)
    - 423rd Military Police Company (General Support), in Shoreham (NY)
    - 430th Military Police Detachment (Law Enforcement), in Red Bank (NJ)
  - 336th Military Police Battalion, in Pittsburgh (PA)
    - Headquarters and Headquarters Company, in Pittsburgh (PA)
    - 307th Military Police Company (General Support), in New Kensington (PA)
    - 363rd Military Police Company (General Support), in Grafton (WV)
      - Detachment 1, 363rd Military Police Company (General Support), in Morgantown (WV)
      - Detachment 2, 363rd Military Police Company (General Support), in Pittsburgh (PA)
    - 424th Military Police Detachment (Detention Camp), in Ashley (PA)
  - 340th Military Police Battalion, in Ashley (PA)
    - Headquarters and Headquarters Company, in Ashley (PA)
    - 345th Military Police Company (Combat Support), in Ashley (PA)
    - 367th Military Police Company (Detention), in Horsham (PA)
    - 812th Military Police Company (General Support), in Orangeburg (NY)
  - 382nd Military Police Battalion, at Westover Air Reserve Base (MA)
    - Headquarters and Headquarters Company, at Westover Air Reserve Base (MA)
    - 94th Military Police Company (Combat Support), in Londonderry (NH)
      - Detachment 1, 94th Military Police Company (Combat Support), in Saco (ME)
    - 362nd Military Police Detachment (Law Enforcement), in Ashley (PA)
    - 1367th Military Police Company (Combat Support), in Middletown (CT)
  - 400th Military Police Battalion, at Fort Meade (MD)
    - Headquarters and Headquarters Company, at Fort Meade (MD)
    - 352nd Military Police Company (Detention), in Rockville (MD)
    - 372nd Military Police Company (General Support), in Cumberland (MD)
      - Detachment 1, 372nd Military Police Company (General Support), at Fort Meade (MD)
