= 97th Military Police Battalion =

97th Military Police BN
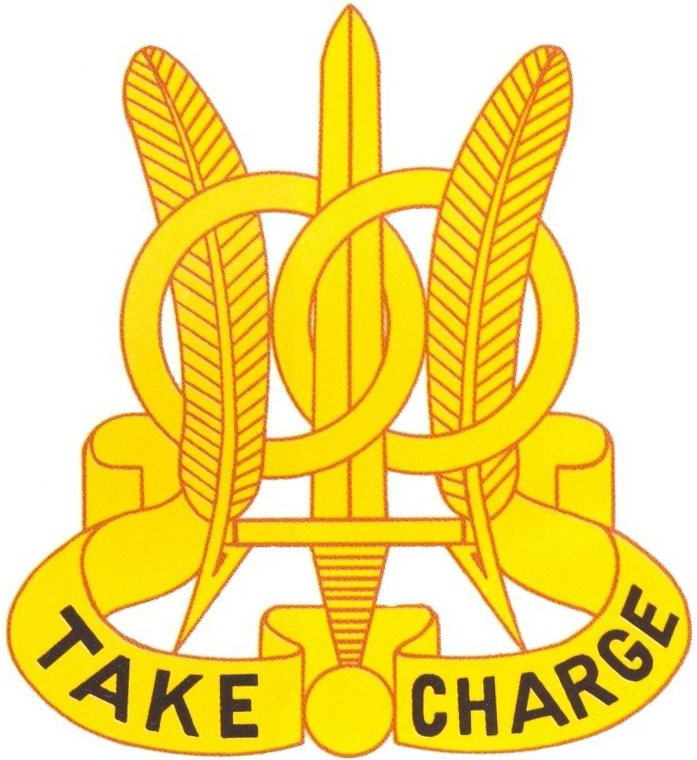
- Distinctive unit insignia
- Active: 13 June 1945 – 5 May 2026
- Country: United States
- Branch: Active Duty
- Type: Military Police Battalion
- Role: Military Police
- Size: Battalion
- Part of: 89th Military Police Brigade
- Garrison/HQ: Fort Riley, Kansas
- Motto: Take Charge
- Engagements: World War II; Korean War; Vietnam War; Operation Iraqi Freedom; Operation Enduring Freedom

Commanders
- Current commander: LTC Tommy E. Sieker
- Command Sergeant Major: CSM John W. Keenan

The 97th Military Police Battalion is a Military Police Battalion of the United States Army based at Fort Riley, Kansas. Activated in Europe during World War II, the unit provided military police support and during the Korean War, the 97th Military Police Battalion conducted internment operations throughout the duration of the conflict. Since then, the Battalion has honorably served the country in several conflicts to include Vietnam, Operation Iraqi Freedom, and most recently, returning in July 2010, Operation Enduring Freedom.

== Mission statement ==
On order, the 97th Military Police Battalion deploys worldwide to conduct Military Police operations in support of Forces Command. The battalion also conducts continuous Law and Order operations in support of the Fort Riley military community.

== Organization ==
The battalion is subordinate to 89th Military Police Brigade. It is headquartered at Fort Riley, Kansas. Over 800 Soldiers assigned to the 97th MP BN are stationed there.

The Battalion consists of four Military Police companies, two Military Police Detachments and one Headquarters and Headquarters Detachment:

- Headquarters and Headquarters Detachment (HHD)
- 116th Military Police Company
- 287th Military Police Company
- 300th Military Police Company
- 977th Military Police Company
- 73rd Military Police Detachment
- 523rd Military Police Detachment

== History ==
=== World War II ===
Activated in Europe on 13 June 1945 towards the end of World War II, the unit served in Western Europe during the end of the war before being deactivated on 12 November 1945 in France.

=== Korean War ===
On 28 October 1951, the battalion was reactivated to serve in the Korean War where it operated the Prisoner of War Enclosure Number Nine in support of the UN led Prisoner of War internment operations. The facility secured 21,932 prisoners. The 97th MP BN served in the Korean War until it was deactivated on 20 March 1953. The unit was awarded the Republic of Korea Presidential Unit Citation two times for its contributions.

=== Vietnam War ===
The 97th MP BN was reactivated at Fort Lewis, Washington on 1 June 1966 and deployed to South East Asia. While based at Cam Ranh Bay, their mission was to provide Law and Order as well as Battlefield Circulation Control. It accomplished this with the 630th MP Company, 218th MP Company, 981st MP Company (Sentry Dog), and the 178th MP Detachment (L&O). The battalion is credited with completing a 450 mile long convoy of engineers and supplies that started in southern Vietnam and ended in Cambodia. This was the longest convoy ever attempted during the conflict. The battalion's assets included V-100 Commando Armored Security Vehicles and Military Police gun jeeps mounted with M60 machine guns. After six years of service in Vietnam, the battalion redeployed to the United States and inactivated at Oakland Army Base, California on 30 April 1972. The battalion was awarded the Meritorious Unit Commendation and the Republic of Vietnam Cross of Gallantry with Palm for its distinctive service in South East Asia.

=== Post Cold War ===
Towards the end of the Cold War, the battalion found itself activated in Mannheim, Germany on 16 September 1989, where its primary missions were military customs and control of the U.S. Confinement Facility in Mannheim. It was subordinate to the 42nd MP Group (Customs) which later reflagged as the 14th MP Brigade. Its customs units were the 193rd MP Company (Nuremberg), 256th MP Company (Frankfurt), 285th MP Company (Karlsruhe), 294th MP Company (Kaiserslautern) and 560th MP Company (Bremerhaven). The battalion was inactivated in September 1994.

=== Operation Iraqi Freedom ===
The battalion was activated at Fort Riley, Kansas on 16 October 2005. The battalion commands and controls the 116th MP Company, the 287th MP Company, the 300th MP Company, and the 977th MP Company. The BN HQ deployed in September 2006 in support of Operation Iraqi Freedom where it provided command and control to 11 Military Police Companies conducting Police Transition Team missions. The battalion redeployed in December 2007 after 15 months to reconstitute and prepare for future requirements in support of the global war on terrorism.

=== Operation Enduring Freedom ===
The BN headquarters deployed in July 2009 to Afghanistan in support of the International Security Assistance Force (ISAF) and Operation Enduring Freedom IX-XI, mentoring and partnering with the Afghan National Police in Kandahar City. The battalion was ADCON to 4th BCT, 82nd Airborne Division and NATO, TACON to Task Force Kandahar, which was commanded by a Canadian General Officer. The battalion's mentorship mission eventually evolved to include responsibilities as the battle space owners for Kandahar City, ISAF's strategic center of gravity, focusing on security and governance.

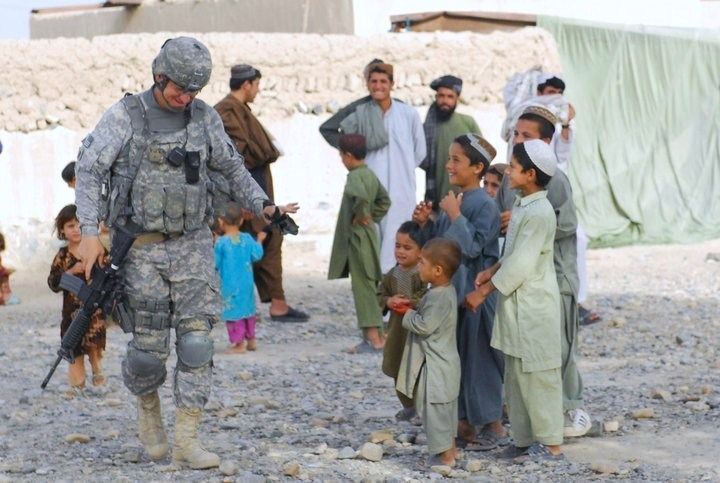
Former CSM Thomas Sivak walking the streets of Afghanistan Photo by: SPC Casey Collier

The battalion redeployed in July 2010 to continue its support to the 1st Infantry Division and the Fort Riley community, standing ready for when the nation calls again for the Guardian Battalion to Assist, Protect, and Defend our country's interests.

=== Border support operations ===
In October 2018 the 97th MP BN was tasked with helping with Border support operations, being sent to Brownsville Texas where they supported the Marine Corps and United States Customs and Border Protection with riot control and other duties.

=== Inactivation ===
On Sept. 27, 2024 the 97th MP Battalion and its three companies inactivated at Fort Riley.

== Honors ==
=== Unit decorations ===
Ribbon	Award	Year	Notes
	Meritorious Unit Commendation (Army)	1967–1968	for service in Vietnam
	Republic of Korea Presidential Unit Citation	1950–1952	for service in Korea
	Republic of Vietnam Cross of Gallantry with Palm	1966–1972	for service in Vietnam
