= 200th Military Police Command (United States) =

Senior law enforcement unit within the U.S. Army Reserve Command

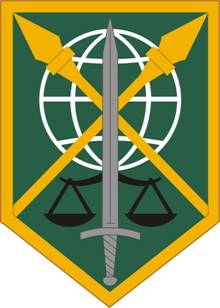
- Shoulder Sleeve Insignia
- Active: April 16, 2008 - present
- Country: United States
- Branch: United States Army Reserve
- Type: Military police
- Size: Division
- Part of: United States Army Reserve Command
- Garrison/HQ: Fort George G. Meade, Maryland
- Motto: Commanding the Best
- Colors: Green and Gold

Commanders
- Commanding General: Major General Susie S. Kuilan
- Command Sergeant Major: John Kyle Jenkins
- Deputy Commanding General (Support): Brigadier General Vance Kuhner
- Deputy Commanding General (Operations): Brigadier General John M. Dunn
- Command Chief Warrant Officer: Chief Warrant Officer 5 James E. Towle III
- Chief of Staff: Colonel Jonathan W. Bennett
- Notable commanders: MG Hussey 2019-2022, MG Garcia 2016-2019, MG Churn 2014-2016, MG Sanford Holman (2011-2014), MG Adolph McQueen (2008-2011)

Insignia
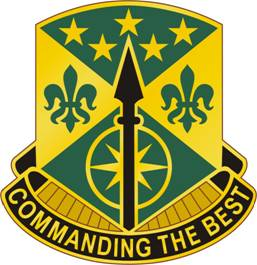
- Distinctive Unit Insignia

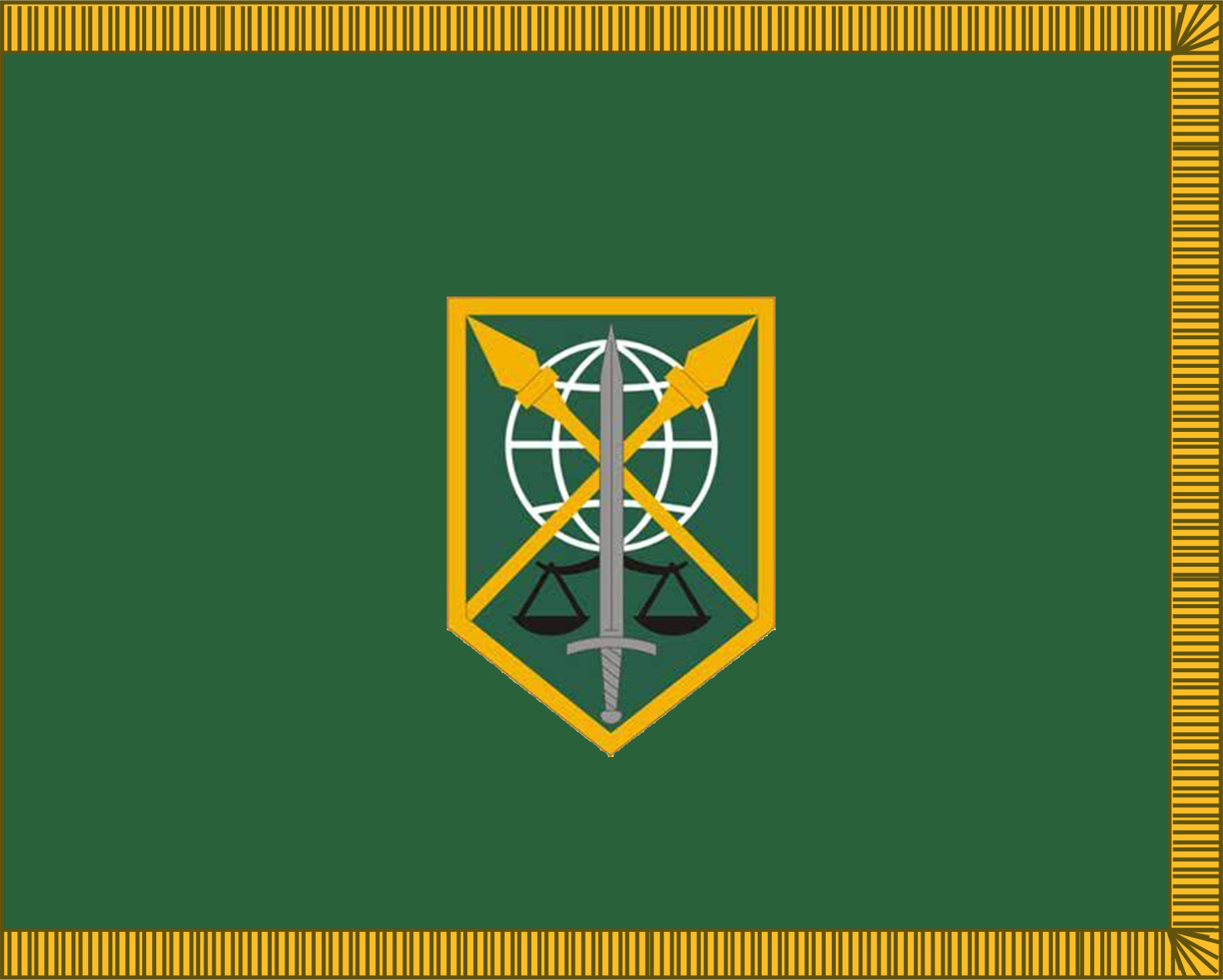
- 200th Military Police Command Flag

The 200th Military Police Command is the senior military law enforcement unit within the U.S. Army Reserve. The subordinate elements of the 200th MP Command are primarily military police units, but the command also includes criminal investigation detachments, chaplains, historians, and public affairs detachments. Units are dispersed across the continental United States with major subordinate units located in California, Michigan, New York, Tennessee, and Indiana. The command is a departure from the legacy structure of a strategic force in the Army Reserve with assigned chains of command based mostly on geography. The purpose of this command is to train, command, and deploy units primarily by their functional capabilities.

== History ==
The 200th Military Police Command was constituted March 6, 2006 (from the former 220th MP Brigade) in the United States Army Reserve as the Headquarters and Headquarters Company, 200th Military Police Command. It was activated April 16, 2008 at Fort Meade, Maryland.

The 200th was formed as part of a transformation of the Army Reserve that reorganized units into strategically consolidated forces with similar functional capabilities. Nearly 97% of all Army Reserve military police assets are now commanded by the 200th.

== Organization ==
The 200th Military Police Command is a subordinate functional command of the United States Army Reserve Command. As of January 2026 the command consists of the following units:

- 200th Military Police Command, at Fort Meade (MD)
  - 200th Military Police Command Mission Support Element, at Fort Meade (MD)
  - 11th Military Police Brigade, at Joint Forces Training Base – Los Alamitos (CA)
    - Headquarters and Headquarters Company, at Joint Forces Training Base – Los Alamitos (CA)
    - 96th Military Police Battalion, in Fallbrook (CA)
    - 324th Military Police Battalion, in Fresno (CA)
    - 387th Military Police Battalion, in Glendale (AZ)
    - 390th Military Police Battalion, at Joint Base Lewis–McChord (WA)
    - 393rd Military Police Battalion (CID), in Bell (CA)
    - 607th Military Police Battalion, in Grand Prairie (TX)
  - 290th Military Police Brigade, in Nashville (TN)
    - Headquarters and Headquarters Company, in Nashville (TN)
    - 160th Military Police Battalion, in Tallahassee (FL)
    - 304th Military Police Battalion, in Nashville (TN)
    - 317th Military Police Battalion, in Tampa (FL)
    - 535th Military Police Battalion, in Cary (NC)
    - 724th Military Police Battalion, in Fort Lauderdale (FL)
    - 733rd Military Police Battalion (CID), at Fort Gillem (GA)
  - 300th Military Police Brigade, in Inkster (MI)
    - Headquarters and Headquarters Company, in Inkster (MI)
    - 159th Military Police Battalion (CID), in Terre Haute (IN)
    - 327th Military Police Battalion, in Arlington Heights (IL)
    - 384th Military Police Battalion, in Fort Wayne (IN)
    - 391st Military Police Battalion, in Columbus (OH)
    - 530th Military Police Battalion, in Elkhorn (NE)
    - 785th Military Police Battalion, in Fraser (MI)
    - 439th Military Police Detachment, in Elkhorn (NE)
    - 540th Military Police Detachment, in Elkhorn (NE)
  - 333rd Military Police Brigade, in Farmingdale (NY)
    - Headquarters and Headquarters Company, in Farmingdale (NY)
    - 310th Military Police Battalion, in Farmingdale (NY)
    - 336th Military Police Battalion, in Pittsburgh (PA)
    - 340th Military Police Battalion, in Ashley (PA)
    - 382nd Military Police Battalion, at Westover Air Reserve Base (MA)
    - 400th Military Police Battalion, at Fort Meade (MD)

== See also ==
- The Phoenix Massacre
