= 759th Military Police Battalion =

Active United States Army battalion

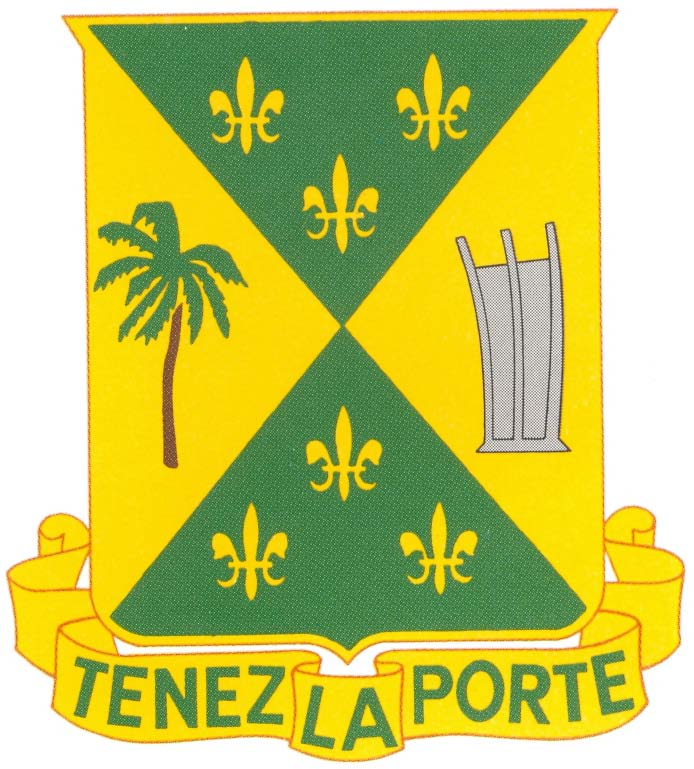
- Coat of Arms
- Active: 19 August 1942 – 1 November 1953 Germany; 6 June 1968 – 10 June 2026
- Country: United States
- Branch: United States Army
- Type: Military Police
- Role: Military Police
- Size: Battalion
- Part of: 89th Military Police Brigade (United States)
- Garrison/HQ: Fort Carson, CO
- Nickname: Lone Sentinel
- Motto: "Tenez La Porte" Hold the Gate
- Colors: Green and Gold
- Engagements: World War II; Operation Desert Shield / Desert Storm; Operation Iraqi Freedom; Operation Enduring Freedom
- Decorations: Joint Meritorious Unit Award Meritorious Unit Commendation (3); Navy Unit Commendation Army Superior Unit Award
- Battle honours: Operation Phantom Fury
- Website: Official website

Commanders
- Commander: Lieutenant Colonel Sc Daniel l. Gonzalez

Insignia
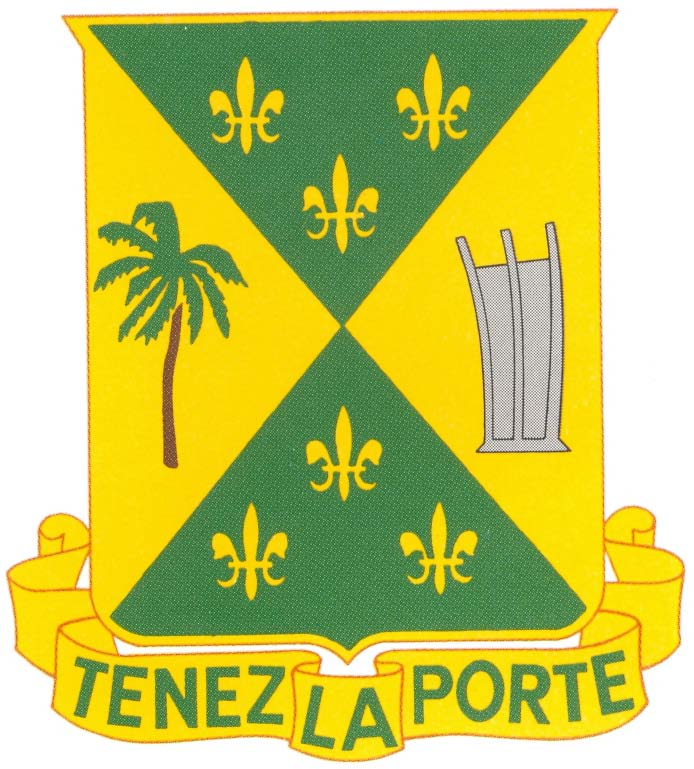
- Distinctive Unit Insignia

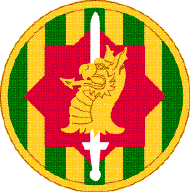
- 89th MP BDE Shoulder Patch

The 759th Military Police Battalion was a military police battalion in the United States Army. It was stationed at Fort Carson, CO – "The Mountain Post". It was administratively controlled by the 4th Infantry Division Sustainment Brigade at Fort Carson, and was a part of the 89th Military Police Brigade at Fort Hood, Texas.

== Lineage ==
- Constituted 19 August 1942 in the Army of the United States as the 759th Military Police Battalion
- Activated 15 September 1942 at Fort Ontario, New York
- Reorganized and redesignated 17 September 1947 as the 759th Military Police Service Battalion
- Reorganized and redesignated 20 November 1950 as the 759th Military Police Battalion
- Allotted 26 November 1952 to the Regular Army
- Inactivated 1 November 1953 in Germany
- Activated 6 June 1968 at Fort Dix, New Jersey (Organic elements inactivated 1 November 1970 at Fort Dix, New Jersey).
- Inactivated 10 June 2026 at Fort Carson, Colorado.

== Subordinate units ==
- 127th Military Police Company
- 984th Military Police Company

== Campaign participation ==
=== World War II ===
- Naples-Foggia
- Rome-Arno
- Southern France (with arrowhead)
- Rhineland
- Ardennes-Alsace
- Central Europe
- Germany

=== Cold War ===
- Berlin Airlift

=== Southwest Asia ===
- Defense of Saudi Arabia
- Liberation and Defense of Kuwait
- Southwest Asia Cease-Fire
- Operation Noble Eagle
- OIF 2
  - Siege of Sadr City
  - Operation Phantom Fury
- OIF 06-08
- Afghanistan OEF X

== Unit decorations ==
Ribbon	Award	Year	Notes
	Joint Meritorious Unit Award	1994	for service in Guantanmo Bay
	Meritorious Unit Commendation (Army)	1990–1991	for service in Southwest Asia
	Meritorious Unit Commendation (Army)	2004	for service in Iraq
	Meritorious Unit Commendation (Army)	2006–2007	for service in Iraq
	Navy Unit Commendation (Navy)	2004	for service in Operation Phantom Fury, Fallujah, Iraq
	Superior Unit Award	1996–1997	
