= 300th Military Police Brigade =

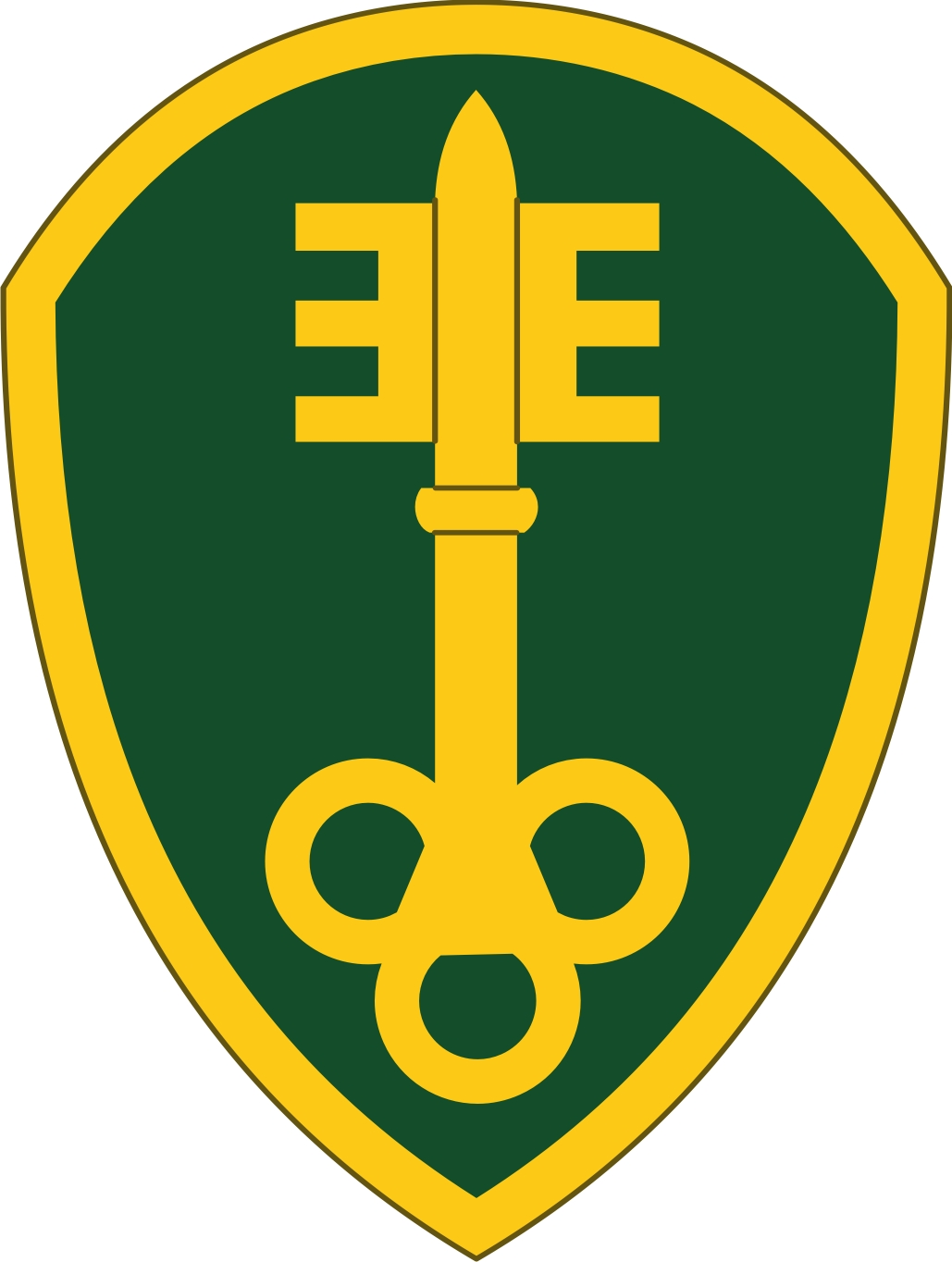
- Active: 1959-present
- Country: United States
- Branch: United States Army Reserve
- Role: Military Police
- Size: Brigade
- Part of: 200th Military Police Command (United States)
- Garrison/HQ: Inkster, Michigan
- Website: https://www.facebook.com/300mp/

Commanders
- Current commander: COL Nathaniel Stobert
- Command Sergeant Major: CSM Joe Neal

Insignia
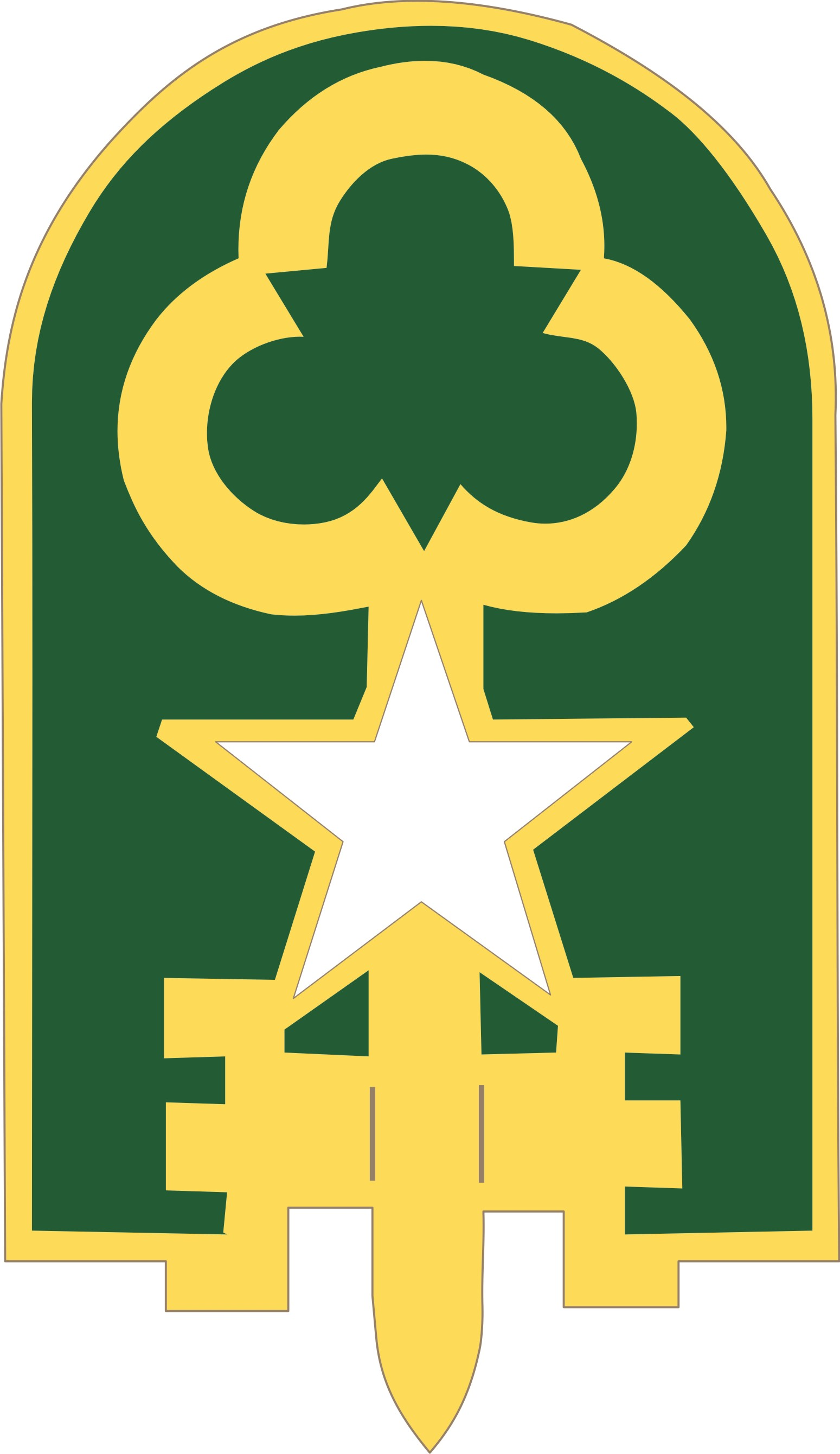
- 300th Military Police Brigade DUI

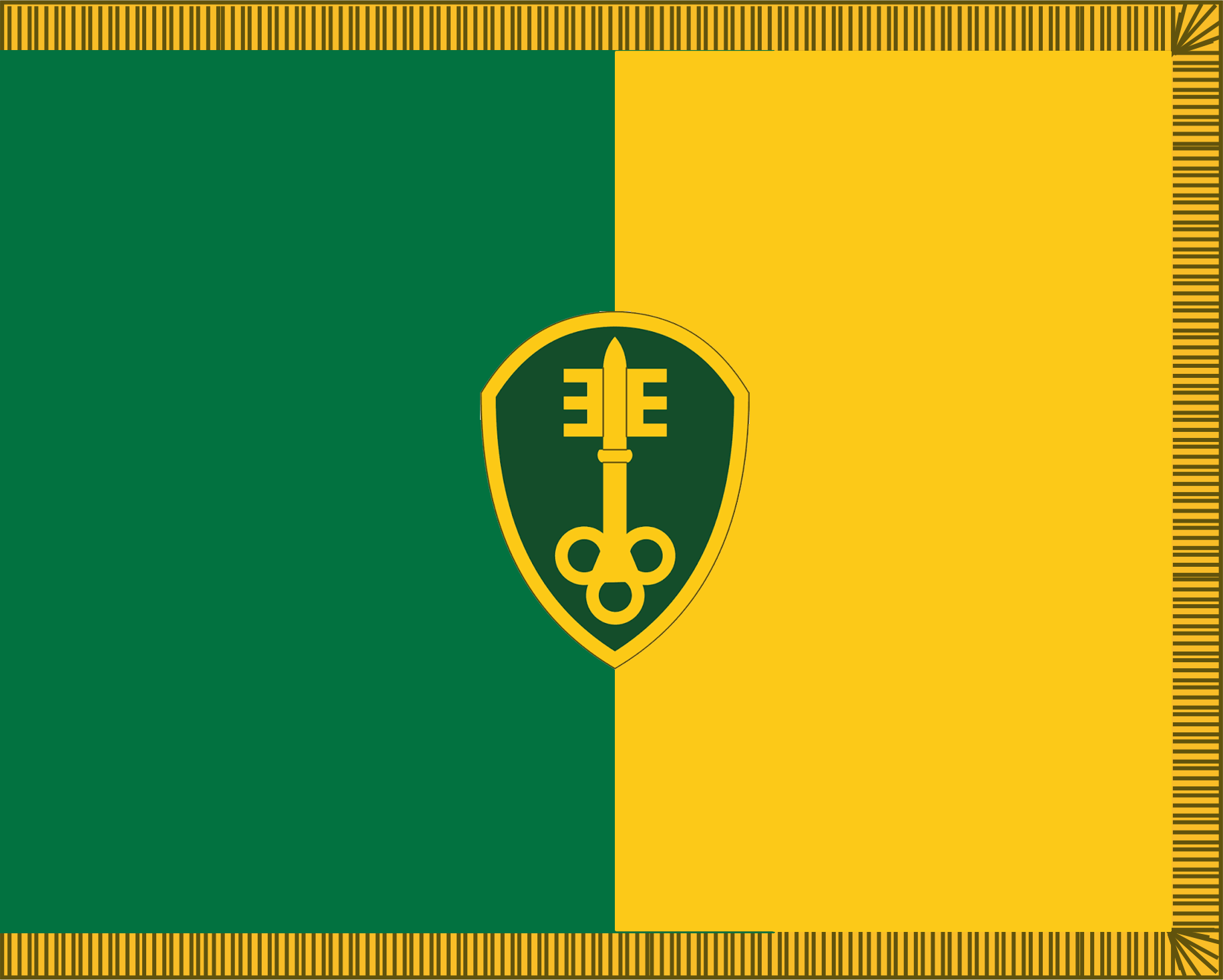
- 300th Military Police Brigade Flag

The 300th Military Police Brigade is a unit of the US Army Reserve since 2002. The unit was first created in 1959 as the 300th Military Police Prisoner of War Command assign to Fifth Army. In 1982 it was reorganized as the 300th Military Police Command and assigned to Fourth Army. The unit became a brigade in 2002 and is currently assigned to the 20th Military Police Command of the US Army Reserve.

The unit earned the Meritorious Unit Commendation in 2007 for taking part in the Iraq Surge Campaign.

== Organization ==
The brigade is a subordinate unit of the 200th Military Police Command. As of December 2025 the brigade consists of the following units:

- 300th Military Police Brigade, in Inkster (MI)
  - Headquarters and Headquarters Company, in Inkster (MI)
  - 439th Military Police Detachment (Detention Camp), in Elkhorn (NE)
  - 540th Military Police Detachment (Detention Camp), in Elkhorn (NE)
  - 159th Military Police Battalion (CID), in Terre Haute (IN)
    - Headquarters and Headquarters Company, in Terre Haute (IN)
    - 220th Military Police Detachment (CID), in Scranton (PA)
    - 321st Military Police Detachment (CID), in Bartlesville (OK)
    - 323rd Military Police Detachment (CID), in Jackson (MI)
    - 375th Military Police Detachment (CID), in Columbus (OH)
    - 378th Military Police Detachment (CID), in Louisville (KY)
    - 399th Military Police Detachment (CID), in St. Louis (MO)
  - 327th Military Police Battalion, in Arlington Heights (IL)
    - Headquarters and Headquarters Company, in Arlington Heights (IL)
    - 102nd Military Police Company (General Support), in Sheboygan (WI)
      - Detachment 1, 102nd Military Police Company (General Support), in Fond du Lac (WI)
    - 822nd Military Police Company (Detention), in Arlington Heights (IL)
    - 1304th Military Police Company (General Support), in Arlington Heights (IL)
  - 384th Military Police Battalion, in Fort Wayne (IN)
    - Headquarters and Headquarters Company, in Fort Wayne (IN)
    - 79th Military Police Company (General Support), in Wabasha (MN)
      - Detachment 1, 79th Military Police Company (General Support), in Worthington (MN)
    - 339th Military Police Company (General Support), in Davenport (ΙA)
    - 415th Military Police Detachment (Law Enforcement), in Fort Dodge (ΙA)
  - 391st Military Police Battalion, in Columbus (OH)
    - Headquarters and Headquarters Company, in Columbus (OH)
    - 308th Military Police Company (Detention), at Fort Carson (CO)
    - 342nd Military Police Company (General Support), in Columbus (OH)
      - Detachment 1, 342nd Military Police Company (General Support), in Troy (OH)
    - 447th Military Police Company (General Support), in North Canton (OH)
      - Detachment 1, 447th Military Police Company (General Support), in Columbus (OH)
  - 530th Military Police Battalion, in Elkhorn (NE)
    - Headquarters and Headquarters Company, in Elkhorn (NE)
    - 45th Military Police Detachment (Law Enforcement), in Columbus (NE)
    - 346th Military Police Company (General Support), at Fort Riley (KS)
      - Detachment 1, 346th Military Police Company (General Support), in Wichita (KS)
    - 420th Military Police Company (Detention), in Salt Lake City (UT)
    - 603rd Military Police Company (General Support), in Belton (MO)
      - Detachment 1, 603rd Military Police Company (General Support), in St. Joseph (MO)
  - 785th Military Police Battalion, in Fraser (MI)
    - Headquarters and Headquarters Company, in Fraser (MI)
    - 303rd Military Police Company (Combat Support), in Jackson (MI)
    - 377th Military Police Company (Combat Support), in Cincinnati (OH)
      - Detachment 1, 377th Military Police Company (Combat Support), in Bloomington (IN)
