= 11th Military Police Brigade =

Military Police brigade of the United States Army

- Shoulder sleeve insignia
- Active: 1967–1972; 2005–Present
- Country: United States
- Branch: United States Army Reserve
- Type: Military Police Brigade
- Role: Military Police
- Size: Brigade
- Part of: 200th Military Police Command
- Garrison/HQ: Joint Forces Training Base – Los Alamitos (CA)
- Mottos: Command, Plan, and Control
- Colors: Green and Gold

Commanders
- Notable commanders: Adolph McQueen

Insignia
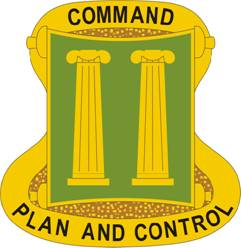
- Distinctive unit insignia

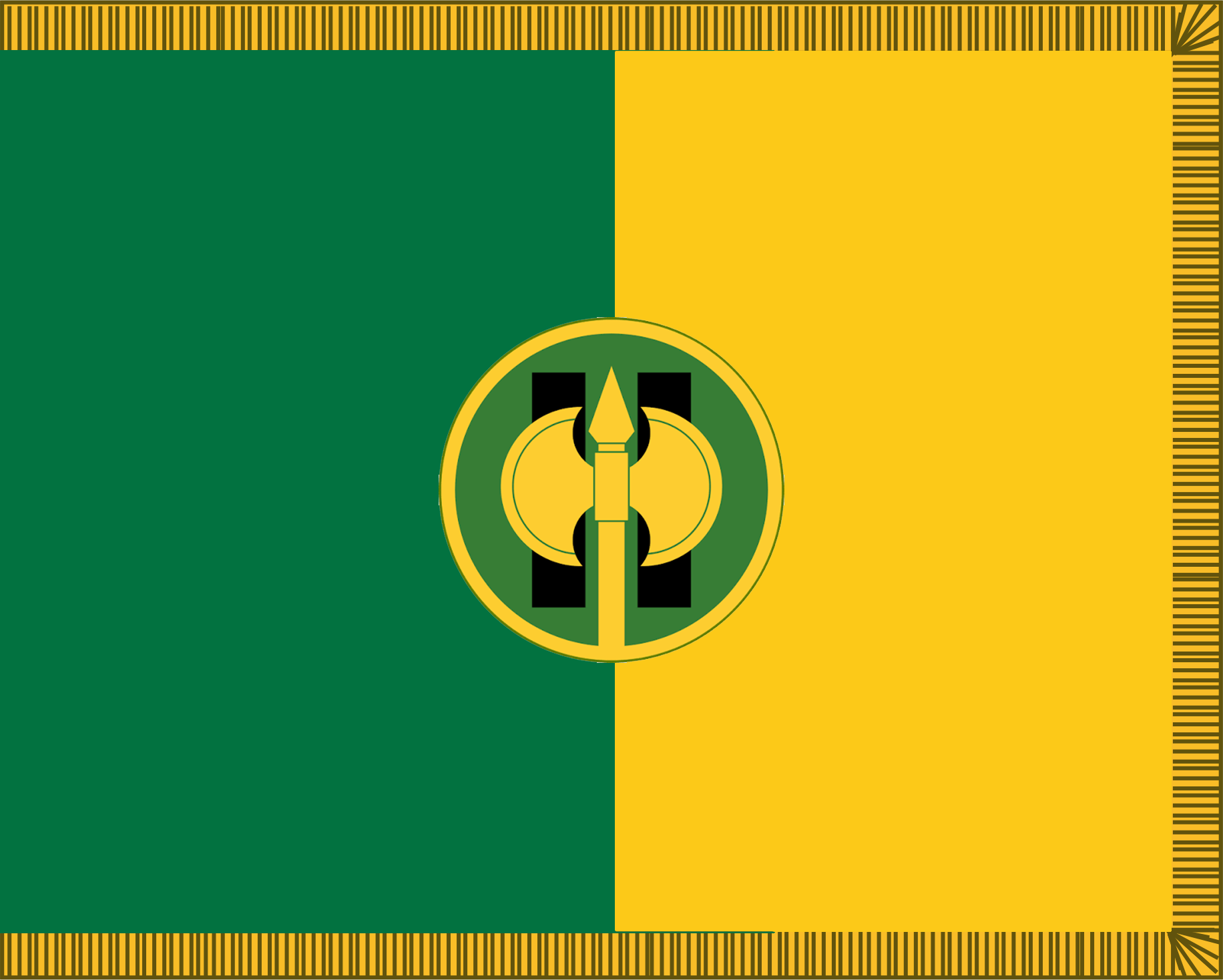
- 11th Military Police Brigade Flag

The 11th Military Police Brigade is a military police brigade of the United States Army Reserve based at Joint Forces Training Base – Los Alamitos in California.

== Organization ==
The brigade is a subordinate unit of the 200th Military Police Command. As of December 2025 the brigade consists of the following units:

- 11th Military Police Brigade, at Joint Forces Training Base – Los Alamitos (CA)
  - Headquarters and Headquarters Company, at Joint Forces Training Base – Los Alamitos (CA)
  - 96th Military Police Battalion, in Fallbrook (CA)
    - Headquarters and Headquarters Company, in Fallbrook (CA)
    - 358th Military Police Company (Detention), in Tustin (CA)
    - 382nd Military Police Detachment (Law Enforcement), in San Diego (CA)
    - 422nd Military Police Company (General Support), in Bakersfield (CA)
  - 324th Military Police Battalion, in Fresno (CA)
    - Headquarters and Headquarters Company, in Fallbrook (CA)
    - 313th Military Police Detachment (Law Enforcement), in Sloan (NV)
    - 341st Military Police Company (General Support), in Mountain View (CA)
    - 357th Military Police Company (Detention), in Concord (CA)
  - 387th Military Police Battalion, in Glendale (AZ)
    - Headquarters and Headquarters Company, in Glendale (AZ)
    - 56th Military Police Company (General Support), in Mesa (AZ)
    - 224th Military Police Company (Detention), in Glendale (AZ)
    - 539th Military Police Detachment (Law Enforcement), in Buckeye (AZ)
  - 390th Military Police Battalion, at Joint Base Lewis–McChord (WA)
    - Headquarters and Headquarters Company, at Joint Base Lewis–McChord (WA)
    - 366th Military Police Company (General Support), in Stillwater (OK)
      - Detachment 1, 366th Military Police Company (General Support), in Huntsville (TX)
    - 438th Military Police Detachment (Law Enforcement), at Fort Douglas (UT)
    - 493rd Military Police Company (Detention), at Joint Base Lewis–McChord (WA)
    - 517th Military Police Detachment (Theater Detainee Reporting Center), in Grand Prairie (TX)
  - 393rd Military Police Battalion (CID), in Bell (CA)
    - Headquarters and Headquarters Company, in Bell (CA)
    - 225th Military Police Detachment (CID), in Phoenix (AZ)
    - 315th Military Police Detachment (CID), at Joint Base Lewis–McChord (WA)
    - 316th Military Police Detachment (CID), in Bell (CA)
    - 380th Military Police Detachment (CID), at Camp Parks (CA)
    - 425th Military Police Detachment (CID), in Grand Prairie (TX)
  - 607th Military Police Battalion, in Grand Prairie (TX)
    - Headquarters and Headquarters Company, in Grand Prairie (TX)
    - 302nd Military Police Company (General Support), in Grand Prairie (TX)
      - Detachment 1, 302nd Military Police Company (General Support), in Huntsville (TX)
    - 348th Military Police Company (Detention), in El Paso (TX)
    - 396th Military Police Detachment (Law Enforcement), in Denver (CO)

== Heraldic items ==
=== Shoulder sleeve insignia ===
- Description:On a green disc within a 1/8 inch (0.32 cm) yellow border 2 3/4 inches (7.0 cm) in diameter overall, two vertical black bars surmounted by a yellow demi-double bladed battle axe, detailed green, issuing from base.
- Symbolism:
1. Green and yellow are the colors traditionally used by Military Police units.
2. The circular shape denotes the unit's continual service to maintain justice.
3. The bars allude to the unit's designation number, "11" and the black color signifies might.
4. The double-headed axe represents the unit's military readiness and vigilance, to enforce military security.
- Background:The shoulder sleeve insignia was approved effective 17 September 2004.

=== Distinctive unit insignia ===
- Description:A gold color metal and enamel device 1 1/8 inches (2.9 cm) in height overall, consisting of a green scroll on two gold rollers, unrolled vertically and bearing two upright gold ionic columns all within a continuous gold motto scroll passing behind the green scroll at the sides and arced across the top and base inscribed on the top arc "COMMAND", and on the lower arc "PLAN AND CONTROL", all in black.
- Symbolism:
1. Green and yellow (gold) are the colors used for Military Police organizations.
2. The scroll, ancient symbol for a legal document, is emblematic of the laws, decrees and edicts to be maintained by the organization.
3. Order out of chaos are among the many symbols attributed to two columns and signify the embodiment of the unit's operation and jurisdiction. The two columns also simulate the numeral eleven and allude to the unit's designation.
- Background:
1. The distinctive unit insignia was originally approved for the 11th Military Police Group on 6 June 1969.
2. It was re-designated for the 11th Military Police Brigade effective 17 September 2004.

== Lineage ==
- Constituted 29 December 1966 in the Regular Army as Headquarters and Headquarters Detachment, 11th Military Police Group
- Activated 25 February 1967 at Fort Bragg, North Carolina
- Inactivated 3 February 1972 at Fort Bragg, North Carolina
- Re-designated 13 March 2003 as Headquarters and Headquarters Company, 11th Military Police Brigade; concurrently, withdrawn from the Regular Army and allotted to the Army Reserve
- Activated 16 September 2005 at Ashley, Pennsylvania

== History ==
The 11th Military Police Brigade was originally constituted on 29 December 1966 in the Regular Army as Headquarters and Headquarters Detachment, 11th Military Police Group, and activated 25 February 1967 at Fort Bragg, North Carolina. The brigade received its distinctive unit insignia on 6 June 1969.

It was Inactivated on 3 January 1972 at Fort Bragg, North Carolina.

Re-designated 13 March 2003 as Headquarters and Headquarters Company, 11th Military Police Brigade; concurrently, withdrawn from the Regular Army and allotted to the Army Reserve. It received a shoulder sleeve insignia on 17 September 2004.

Activated 16 September 2005 with headquarters in Ashley, Pennsylvania. The 11th MP Brigade provides peacetime command and control of six Military Police Battalions in Pennsylvania, Texas and Maryland.

The 11th Military Police Brigade served as Task Force MP North, Camp Cropper, Iraq, August 2008 to June 2009 conducting detainee operations. During this time thousands of detained Iraqis were released to their village leadership or turned over to the Government of Iraq for prosecution. The 11th Military Police Brigade earned the Meritorious Unit Commendation for superior performance during this time.

The 11th Military Police Brigade was moved to Joint Forces Training Base – Los Alamitos, CA in October 2009.
