= For God and Country (Yee book) =

2005 non-fiction book by James Yee

- Author: James Yee
- Genre: Non fiction
- ISBN: 978-1-586-48369-2

For God And Country, a book by American chaplain James Yee, was published in 2005 by PublicAffairs. James Yee was a US Army Muslim chaplain serving in the Guantanamo Bay prison. This book details his experiences both as a chaplain, and later as a detainee at the prison.
