= 720th Military Police Battalion =

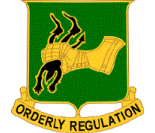
- Distinctive unit insignia
- Active: 10 January 1942–present
- Country: United States
- Branch: Active duty
- Type: Military police
- Size: Battalion
- Part of: 89th Military Police Brigade
- Garrison/HQ: Fort Hood, Texas
- Nickname: "Soldiers of the Gauntlet"
- Motto: "Orderly Regulation"
- Engagements: World War II; Vietnam War; Gulf War; Iraq War

Commanders
- Current commander: LTC Megan R. Williams
- Notable commanders: MG Albert R. Escola; BG Stephen J. Curry; COL Anthony Stamillio; BG Rodney L. Johnson; BG David D. Phillips

The 720th Military Police Battalion is a military police battalion of the United States Army, stationed at Fort Hood, Texas. It is a subordinate unit under the Training and Readiness Authority of the 89th Military Police Brigade. Constituted on 10 January 1942 in the Army as the 720th Military Police Battalion, it was activated during the Second World War at Fort Meade, Maryland on 20 January 1942. The battalion served during that time while stationed in Australia and New Guinea. It was then relocated to Yokohama, Japan on 2 September 1945 until it finally moved to Fort Hood, Texas on 21 February 1955.

== Vision statement ==
As Soldiers of the Gauntlet, we lead reliable and ethical teams, enabling III Armored Corps and 1st Cavalry Division to fight and win, while defending the homeland and protecting our community.

== Organization ==
The battalion is subordinate to the 89th Military Police Brigade. It is headquartered at Fort Hood, Texas.

The battalion consists of three military police companies, a military working dog detachment and a headquarters and headquarters detachment:

- Headquarters and Headquarters Detachment "VANGUARD"
- 226th Military Working Dog Detachment "PRAETORIANS"
- 401st Military Police Company "GUNFIGHTERS"
- 410th Military Police Company "BRAVO SPIRIT"
- 411th Military Police Company "GRIZZLIES"

== History ==
=== World War II ===
The 720th Military Police Battalion, "Soldiers of the Gauntlet," was first constituted on 10 January 1942 in the Regular Army as the 720th Military Police Battalion. It was activated during World II at Fort George G. Meade, Maryland on 20 January 1942. The Battalion served in three major campaigns during the Second World War while based in Australia and New Guine. At the start of the U. S. occupation of Japan in 1945, the four line companies and headquarters detachment of the 720th Battalion were sent to Tokyo and quartered in the abandoned Japanese espionage school in Nakano. In 1948, the facility was renamed Camp Burness in memory of a Battalion member who had died in a plane crash near New Guinea during the War. Later that year, after a fire destroyed the "B" Company barracks, the Battalion was moved to the former Japanese Imperial Navy Academy in the Tsukiji area of Tokyo. The Battalion relocated to Fort Hood, Texas on 21 February 1955.

=== Korean War ===
In 1950, at the start of the Korean War, the X Corps MP Company (Provisional) was formed when C Company was reflagged, filled their TO&E with volunteers from A and B Company, and sent to Korea where it served with distinction, earning a Meritorious Unit Commendation.

=== Vietnam War ===
From October 1966-August 1972 the battalion served in South Vietnam, III & IV Corps Tactical Zones, subordinate to the 89th MP Group, 18th MP Brigade. They performed convoy escort, POW guard/escort, highway security, physical security, and were the first MP unit in the history of the US Armed Forces to perform a three-year infantry counterinsurgency pacification mission, from 1967-1970. Operation Stabilize included Ambush & Reconnaissance, Village Outpost's, River Patrol. Another MP Corps historical first was to direct air, armor, and infantry support for B Company (AKA Bushwhackers) Ambush Teams defending Long Binh Post during the 23 February Tet 1969 attack. On 13 August 1972 the battalion was sent stateside to Ft Hood, Texas assigned to 5th Army. Where in 1974 it was assigned the III Corps.

=== Post-Cold War ===
Between 1990 and 1997 Battalion elements deployed to Kuwait for Operation Desert Shield/Storm, in support of Operation Intrinsic Action; Somalia as part of Operation Restore Hope; Honduras and Guantanamo Bay; and Cuba for Operation Sea Signal, in support of Joint Task Force 160. Elements also deployed to Bosnia-Herzegovina as part of Operation Joint Endeavor/Guard and Joint Forge.

=== Operation Iraqi Freedom ===
The Soldiers of the 720th deployed to Iraq from March 2003 to March 2004, where they operated mainly in Tikrit and Samarra in support of the 4th Infantry Division. They performed many military police missions, including area security, convoy escort, and detainee operations. They also started a program of joint operations with the Iraqi police. 410th MP CO deployed to Baghdad, May 2006 to May 2007, providing security and enabling police partnership with the Iraqi Police and the National Police.

=== Operation Enduring Freedom ===
The 410th Military Police Company deployed to Afghanistan in May 2009 and returned in May 2010. The 401st and 64th Military Police Companies deployed to Afghanistan in May 2010 and returned in April 2011. The 411th Military Police Company deployed to Kandahar Province in May 2011 and returned to Fort Hood in May 2012. HHD, 720th Military Police Battalion deployed in December 2011 and returned in December 2012.

=== ARSTRUC Changes ===
The battalion implemented Army Structure (ARSTRUC) changes in 2024. This change inactivated the 178th Law Enforcement Detachment and the 64th Military Police Company. To conduct installation law enforcement, the Fort Cavazos Law Enforcement Activity (LEA) stood up. The LEA now wears the III Corps patch and is not part of the battalion.

=== Battalion crest and coat of arms ===
The coat of arms was originally approved on 2 May 1952. It was cancelled on 19 July 1973. On 11 August 1999 the coat of arms was reinstated and amended to include a crest. The Distinctive Unit Insignia is a gold color metal and enamel insignia 1 5/32 inches (2.94 cm) in height consisting of a shield blazoned: Vert, a dexter gauntlet in fess Or grasping an imp, head to base, Sable. Attached below the shield a Gold color metal scroll inscribed "ORDERLY REGULATION" in Green enamel letters. The golden restraining hand grasping the inverted black imp, which is symbolical of a petty devil or malignant spirit, is symbolical of the restraining functions of the organization, implying the means by which undesirable factions are kept under control. In the crest, the cross recalls the Cross of Gallantry awarded the unit for outstanding service in Vietnam. The sea-lion refers to the Philippine Presidential Unit Citation awarded for service between 1944 and 1945. The wreath represents honor and achievement. The drawn swords denote readiness and recall the many campaigns in which the 720th Military Police Battalion has distinguished itself. Black signifies strength and resolve. Gold symbolizes excellence, and with green represents the Military Police branch. The motto "ORDERLY REGULATION" is expressive of the determination of the personnel to regulate with order, and alludes to the charges on the shield.

== Honors ==
=== Unit decorations ===
Ribbon	Award	Year	Notes
	Valorous Unit Award	2003	for service in Iraq
	Meritorious Unit Commendation (Army)	1950–1954	for service in Pacific Area
	Meritorious Unit Commendation (Army)	1967–1968	for service in Vietnam
	Meritorious Unit Commendation (Army)	1968–1969	for service in Vietnam
	Meritorious Unit Commendation (Army)	1990–1991	for service in Southwest Asia
	Meritorious Unit Commendation (Army)	2004–2005	for service in Iraq
	Meritorious Unit Commendation (Army)	2007	for service in Iraq
	Meritorious Unit Commendation (Army)	2011–2012	for service in Afghanistan
	Superior Unit Award	1995-1996	
	Superior Unit Award	2005-2006	
	Philippine Republic Presidential Unit Citation	1944–1945	for service in the Philippines
	Republic of Vietnam Cross of Gallantry with Palm	1966–1972	for service in Vietnam

=== Campaign streamers ===
Conflict	Streamer	Year(s)
Vietnam War	Vietnam Defense	1965
Vietnam War	Counteroffensive, Phase II	1966–1967
Vietnam War	Counteroffensive, Phase III	1967–1968
Vietnam War	Tet Counteroffensive	1968
Vietnam War	Counteroffensive, Phase IV	1968
Vietnam War	Counteroffensive, Phase V	1968
Vietnam War	Counteroffensive, Phase VI	1968–1969
Vietnam War	Tet 69/Counteroffensive	1969
Vietnam War	Summer–Fall 1969	1969
Vietnam War	Winter–Spring 1970	1970
Vietnam War	Sanctuary Counteroffensive	1970
Vietnam War	Counteroffensive, Phase VII	1970–1971
Vietnam War	Consolidation I	1970
Vietnam War	Consolidation II	1971
Gulf War	Defense of Saudi Arabia	1990
Gulf War	Liberation and Defense of Kuwait	1990
Gulf War	Cease-Fire	1991
Operation Iraqi Freedom	Iraq	2004–2005
Operation Iraqi Freedom	Iraq	2006–2008
