= 89th Military Police Brigade =

Military police brigade of the III Armored Corps, US Army

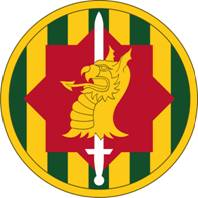
- 89th Military Police Brigade shoulder sleeve insignia
- Active: 15 March 1966 – 21 December 1971; 13 September 1972 – present
- Country: United States
- Branch: United States Army
- Role: Military Police
- Size: Brigade
- Part of: III Armored Corps
- Garrison/HQ: Fort Hood, Texas
- Motto: Proven in Battle
- Engagements: Vietnam War; Gulf War; Iraq War; War in Afghanistan

Commanders
- Commanding officer: COL Lillian I. Woodington
- Command Sergeant Major: CSM Anthony M. Delawrence

Insignia
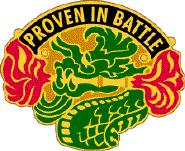
- Distinctive unit insignia

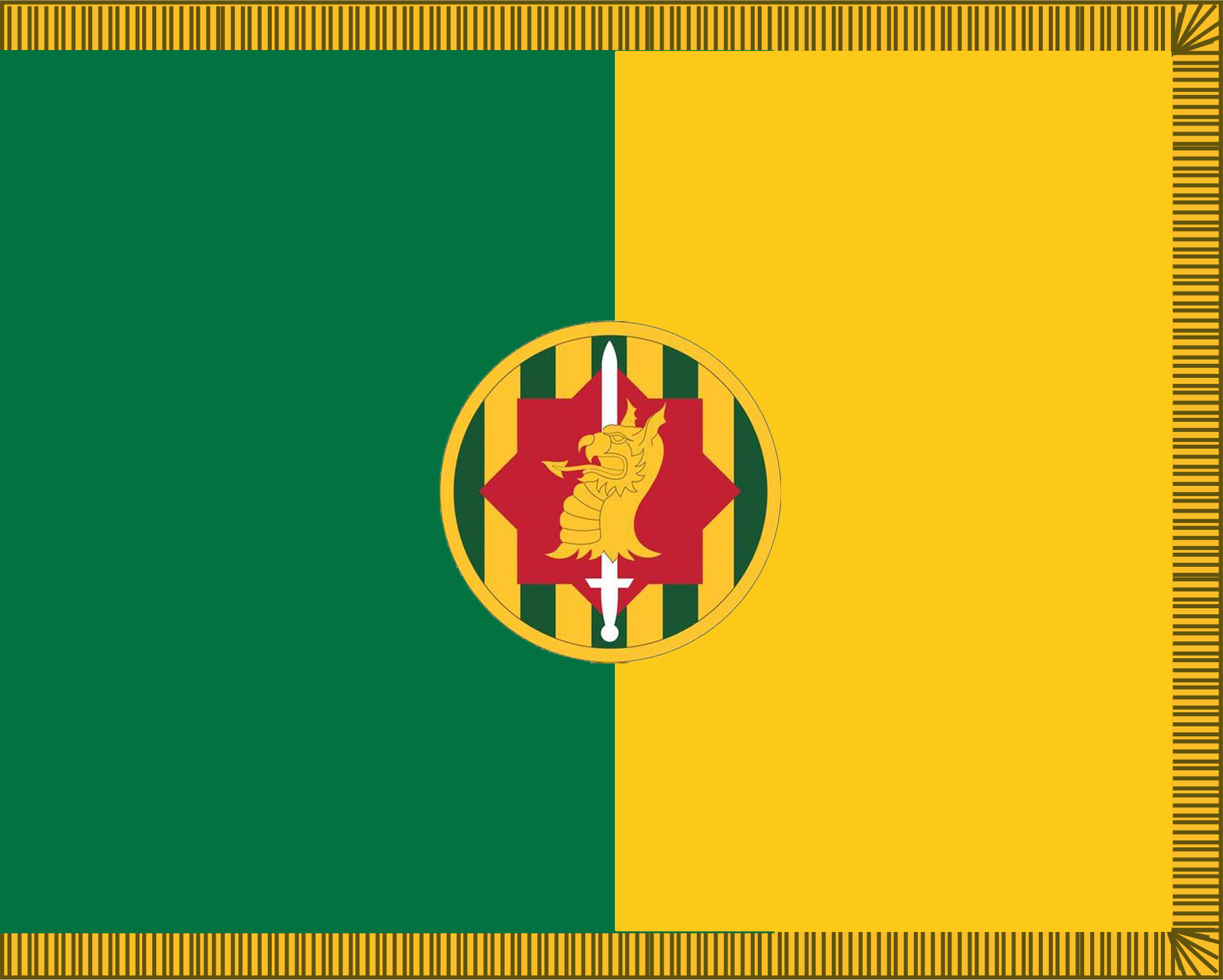
- 89th Military Police Brigade Flag

The 89th Military Police Brigade is a military police brigade of the United States Army based at Fort Hood, Texas. It is a subordinate unit of III Armored Corps.

Activated in Vietnam in the midst of the Vietnam War, the unit provided military police services for two corp-sized forces operating in the region. It played a supporting role throughout the entire conflict, staying in theater for the entire war and earning fifteen campaign streamers.

Since then, the brigade has seen duty in numerous areas of operation throughout the world and performed numerous duties including disaster relief for Hurricane Hugo as well as service in Guantánamo Bay. It also played a supporting role in the Gulf War. Recently the brigade served two tours of duty in support of Operation Iraqi Freedom.

== Organization ==
The brigade is subordinate to III Armored Corps and headquartered at Fort Hood, Texas. Almost 1,000 soldiers of the brigade are stationed there.

The Brigade contains three subordinate battalions of military police(All subordinate battalions to the brigade have been inactivated besides 720th Military Police Battalion):

- 97th Military Police Battalion, at Fort Riley — inactivated on 5 May 2026
- 720th Military Police Battalion, at Fort Hood
- 759th Military Police Battalion, at Fort Carson — inactivated on 10 June 2026

== History ==
=== Vietnam War ===
The 89th Military Police Brigade was originally activated as a "group", roughly the size of a modern regiment. The 89th Military Police Group was constituted in the Regular Army on 19 February 1966 and activated on 15 March of that year in the Republic of Vietnam. The mission of the 89th Military Police Group was to provide general military police support for the III Corps and IV Corps Tactical Zones. The group stayed in Vietnam in support of the two corps' areas of operation. The Group received 15 of the 17 campaign streamers that could be earned for Vietnam service. With the removal of US forces from Vietnam, the organization was inactivated on 21 December 1971.

On 13 September 1972 the unit was activated at Fort Lewis, Washington. The 89th Military Police Group was designed to command and control the operations of three to five military police battalions and other assigned or attached units. Additionally, it provided a Provost Marshal staff section to the corps headquarters while assigned as their senior military police organization.

The 89th Military Police Group remained at Fort Lewis until 21 February 1976 when the colors were transferred to Fort Hood, Texas. On 16 July 1981 the 89th Military Police Group was reorganized as the 89th Military Police Brigade. 1973 & 1974 special members of the 89th PM Group were covertly assigned to Yakima base in Eastern Washington, for special assignments on CID Trafficking via the ASA/NSA center located under ground.

=== Operation Iraqi Freedom ===
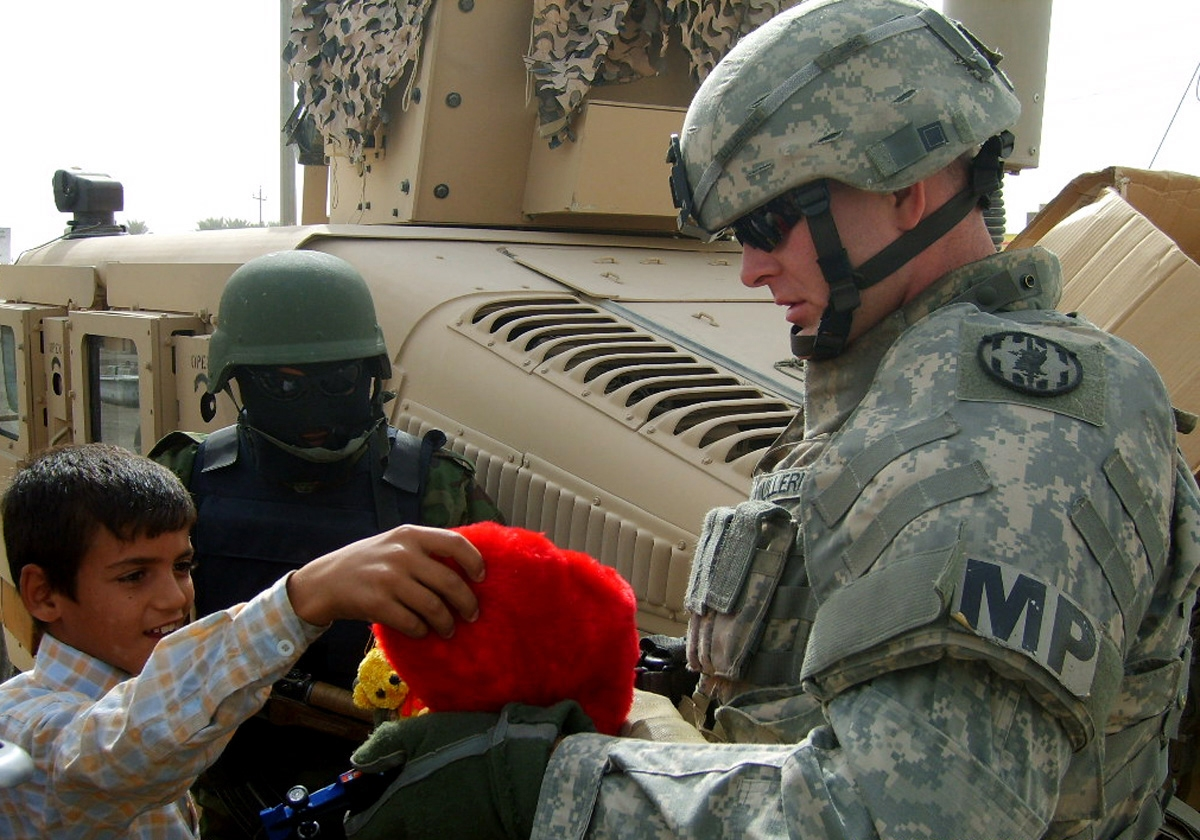
89th MP Brigade soldiers on a humanitarian mission in Iraq.

The 89th Military Police Brigade deployed to Iraq in support of Operation Iraqi Freedom early 2004, where it took over the mission previously tasked to the 18th Military Police Brigade on 31 January 2004. At that time the brigade assumed responsibility for the Iraqi Police training mission as well as the majority of all the Military Police Units in Iraq at that time. The unit returned to Fort Hood in December 2004.

The 89th Military Police Brigade deployed for a second tour in August 2006 to the Iraqi theater of operation in support of Operation Iraqi Freedom 2006–2008. During the deployment, it was composed of over 5,000 military police soldiers in the theater. Brigade responsibilities included corrections and security operations. It deployed K-9 units during some operations. The brigade's primary responsibility, though, was the training of Iraqi police units. The brigade focused on local police units throughout the country, as another MP brigade handled the national police. The brigade commander would brief US Department of Defense officials in The Pentagon on the current situation, live from Iraq. It suffered several casualties, including a soldier killed by sniper fire, a soldier killed by a suicide car bomb, and two soldiers who died of non-combat related causes. The brigade returned home in October 2007, replaced again by the 18th Military Police Brigade. After this, the brigade resumed its policing roles at Fort Hood.

During its second deployment, one of the unit commanders, William H. Steele, became infamous for being accused of breaching military law by aiding the enemy. He was acquitted of the charges, though he was convicted of other charges and subsequently dismissed from the military.

=== Operation Enduring Freedom ===
The 410th Military Police Company deployed to Afghanistan in May 2009 and returned in May 2010. The 116th Military Police Company, 97th MP BN, 89TH MP BDE deployed to FOB Shinwar, Nangarhar Province, Afghanistan from May 2010 to May 2011. The 401st and 64th Military Police Companies deployed to Afghanistan in May 2010 and returned in April 2011. The 411th Military Police Company deployed to Kandahar Province in May 2011 and returned to Fort Hood in May 2012. HHD, 720th Military Police Battalion deployed in December 2011 and returned in December 2012.

== Honors ==
=== Unit decorations ===
Ribbon	Award	Year	Notes
	Meritorious Unit Commendation (Army)	1967–1968	for service in Vietnam
	Meritorious Unit Commendation (Army)	2004–2005	for service in Iraq
	Republic of Vietnam Cross of Gallantry with Palm	1965–1970	for service in Vietnam

=== Campaign streamers ===
Conflict	Streamer	Year(s)
Vietnam War	Vietnam Defense	1965
Vietnam War	Counteroffensive, Phase I	1965–1966
Vietnam War	Counteroffensive, Phase II	1966–1967
Vietnam War	Counteroffensive, Phase III	1967–1968
Vietnam War	Tet Counteroffensive	1968
Vietnam War	Counteroffensive, Phase IV	1968
Vietnam War	Counteroffensive, Phase V	1968
Vietnam War	Counteroffensive, Phase VI	1968–1969
Vietnam War	Tet 69/Counteroffensive	1969
Vietnam War	Summer–Fall 1969	1969
Vietnam War	Winter–Spring 1970	1970
Vietnam War	Sanctuary Counteroffensive	1970
Vietnam War	Counteroffensive, Phase VII	1970–1971
Vietnam War	Consolidation I	1970
Vietnam War	Consolidation II	1971
Gulf War	Defense of Saudi Arabia	1990
Gulf War	Liberation and Defense of Kuwait	1990
Gulf War	Cease-Fire	1991
Operation Iraqi Freedom	Iraq	2004–2005
Operation Iraqi Freedom	Iraq	2006–2008
Operation Enduring Freedom	Afghanistan	2010–2021

== See also ==
- 97th Military Police Battalion
- 93D Military Police Battalion
