= 220th Military Police Brigade =

Inactive US Army Reserve unit

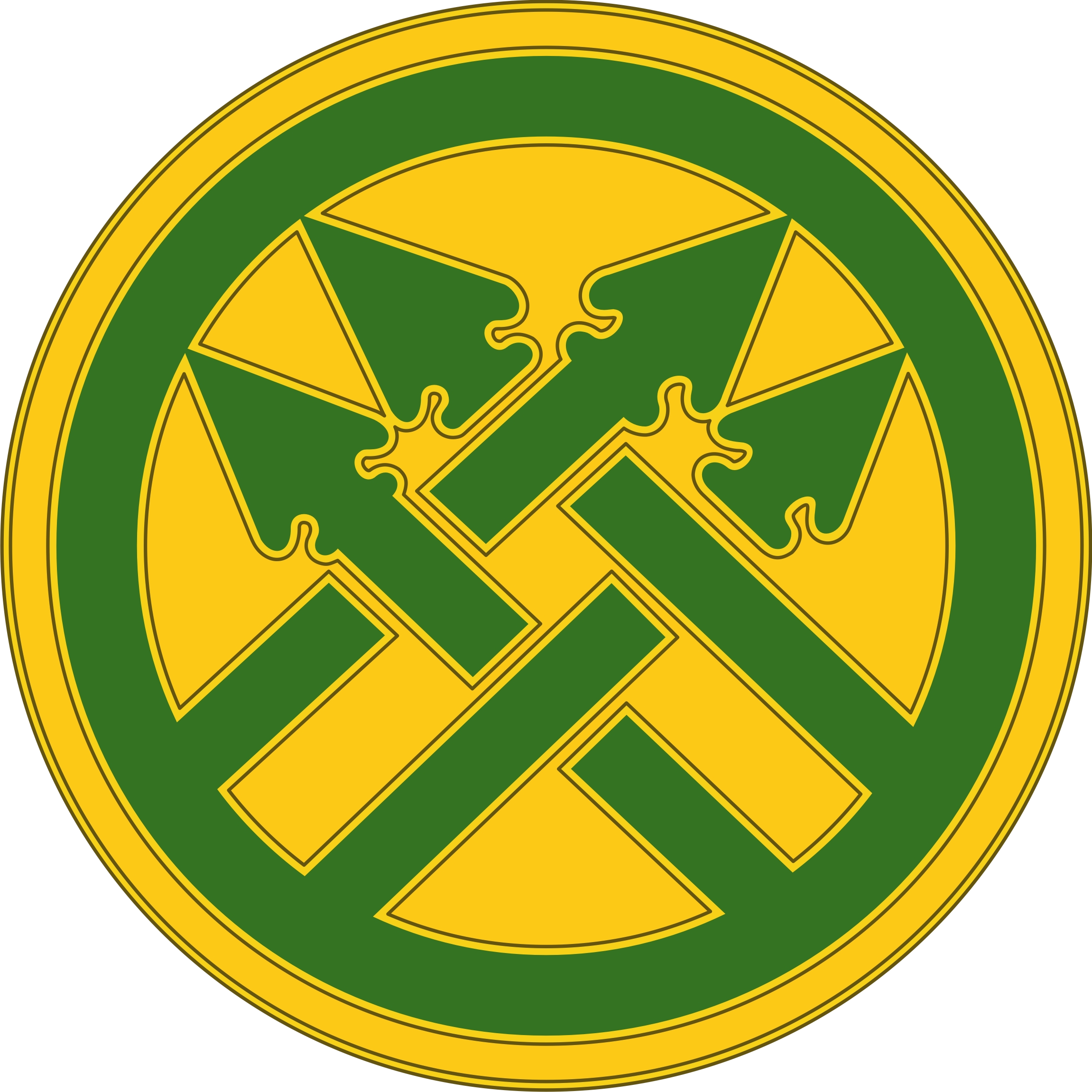
- The 220th Military Police Brigade's combat service identification badge (CSIB)
- Founded: 3 April 1959; 67 years ago
- Country: United States of America
- Branch: United States Army
- Type: Military police unit
- Role: Military law enforcement
- Size: Brigade
- Part of: U.S. Army Reserve
- Garrison/HQ: Hunton Memorial USAR Center; 8791 Snouffer School Road; Gaithersburg, Maryland, U.S. 39.179075°N 77.179173°W
- Motto: "Support by Doing"
- Engagements: Iraq War: Operation Iraqi Freedom

Insignia
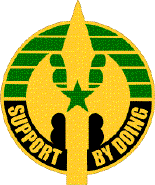
- Distinctive unit insignia

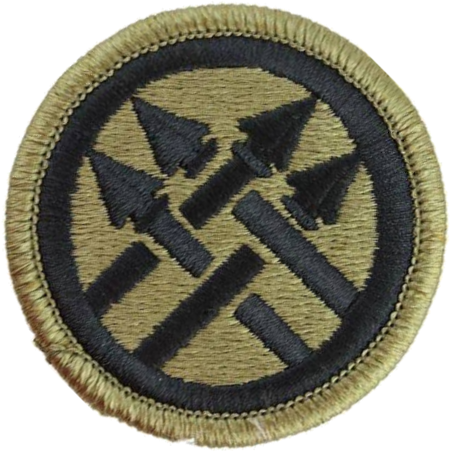
- Shoulder sleeve insignia (2015–present)

- Shoulder sleeve insignia (1972–2015)

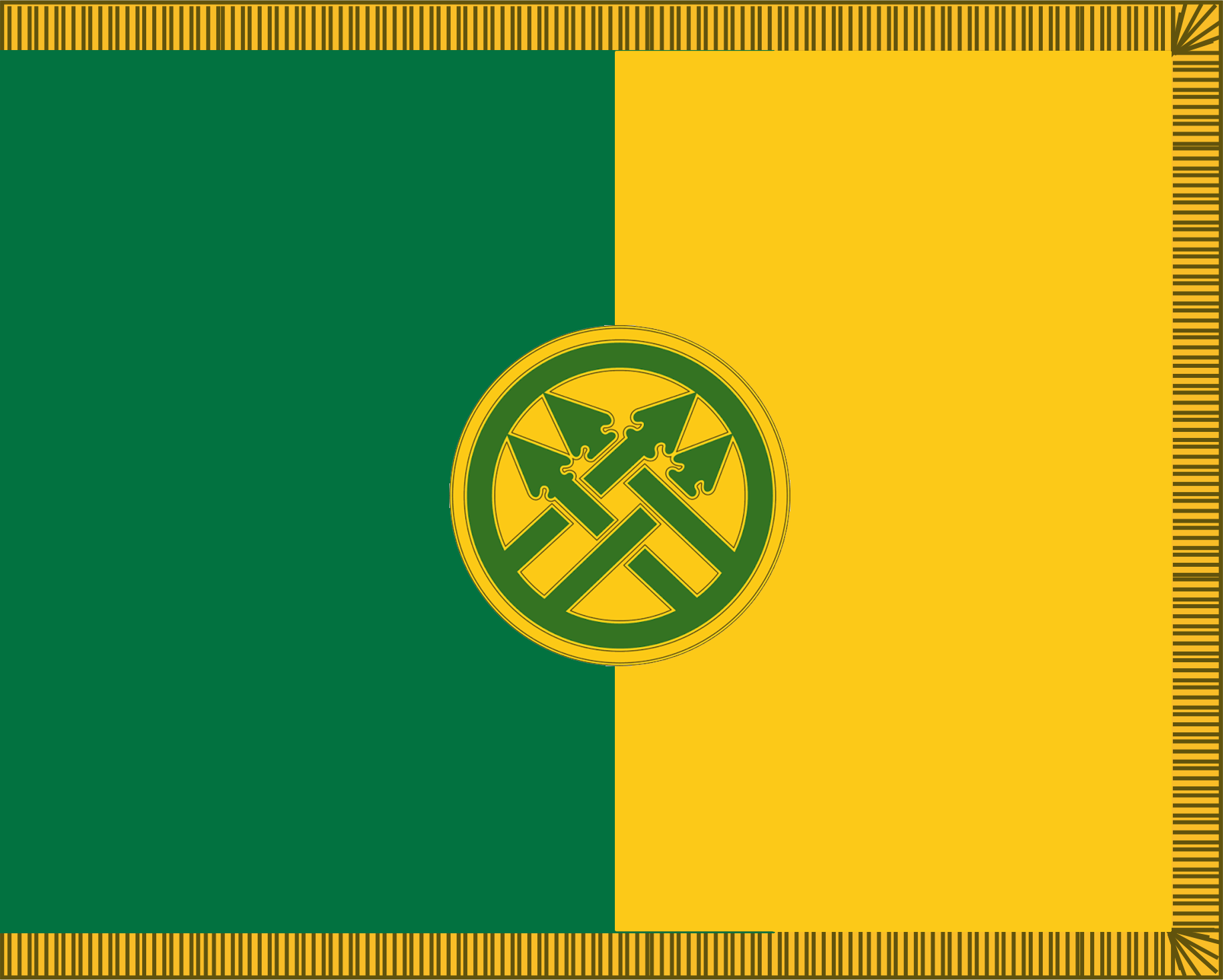
- 220th Military Police Brigade Flag

The 220th Military Police Brigade is a former military police brigade of the United States Army, which was headquartered in Gaithersburg, Maryland. It was Reserve Component formation of the U.S. Army Reserve.

First activated in 1959, the brigade was a part of the reserves for the first 40 years of its existence, and never participated in any conflicts or wars of the 20th century. Its headquarters moved around several places until coming to Gaithersburg in 1970, where it remained until its inactivation. The brigade was activated into the active duty force for one year from early 2003 until early 2004 to participate in the initial invasion and occupation of Iraq, Operation Iraqi Freedom. After this deployment, the brigade was again placed in reserve and commanded units in readiness exercises for other large U.S. combat formations preparing to deploy in support of U.S. operations worldwide. It was reorganized as the 200th Military Police Command on 1 March 2006.

== Organization ==
The 220th Military Police Brigade was headquartered at the Major General Benjamin L. Hunton Memorial United States Army Reserve Center at 8791 Snouffer School Road in Gaithersburg, Maryland, which also serves as the headquarters of the U.S. Army Reserve Legal Command.

As a reserve unit, the formation was not in existence on a permanent basis, but is instead only called upon when needed. The brigade's Headquarters and Headquarters Company was located in Gaithersburg, and it commanded two reserve military police battalions. These were the 336th Military Police Battalion and the 400th Military Police Battalion. The 333rd and the 400th Military Police Brigades took responsibility of the two subordinate battalions upon the 220th's inactivation. The brigade commanded numerous smaller company sized reserve military police units throughout the country. These units may deploy to foreign theaters of operations with the brigade when it is called upon, and they also can deploy to various installations throughout the United States when needed for participation in training and readiness exercises.

== History ==
The unit was first constituted on 3 April 1959 in the Army Reserve as Headquarters and Headquarters Detachment, 220th Military Police Group before being activated on 25 May of that year in Washington, D. C. On 23 July 1960, the location of the group's headquarters was changed to Rockville, Maryland. The group remained in the reserves throughout the Vietnam War, and was never called upon to serve in Vietnam, as active duty military police groups were already being organized in the theater and additional, reserve commands were not needed.

In 1967 and 1968, the group moved from the inactivating XXI Corps (United States) to the new 97th Army Reserve Command.

Ten years later, on 17 April 1970, the location of the group headquarters was again changed to Gaithersburg, Maryland where it remained until inactivation. It received a shoulder sleeve insignia on 24 July 1972 and a distinctive unit insignia on 27 September 1972.

The group was reorganized and redesignated on 10 December 1971 as Headquarters and Headquarters Detachment, 220th Military Police Brigade, allowing it to command a larger number of military police units. On 16 April 1980 the brigade's command element was again reorganized as Headquarters and Headquarters Company, 220th Military Police Brigade. Prior to the Iraq War, the brigade remained on reserve status, prepared to deploy if needed, but it was never called upon for any contingency operations or conflicts, as other active duty military police commands, were called upon to be deployed instead. By 1999, after 40 years of existence, the brigade had yet to be deployed to a foreign theater of operations or participate in any conflicts or contingencies.

The brigade saw only a single activation into active duty service, at the start of the Iraq War. It was ordered into active military service on 10 February 2003 at Gaithersburg, Maryland as part of the U.S. Military's mobilization in preparation for Operation Iraqi Freedom. Some 13,800 reserve component Military Police were called into active duty for the invasion, including the Headquarters of the 220th as well as the 800th Military Police Brigade. Overall, over 57,000 reserve and national guard troops were called into active duty service for the invasion. The brigade assumed command of other reserve and national guard military police units during the operation, including company sized units from Virginia, New York, Illinois, California, Alabama, Kansas, South Carolina and Texas The brigade was, in turn, subordinate to the 377th Theater Support Command. During its tour, the Brigade suffered five casualties; three soldiers killed in combat, and two soldiers killed in vehicle accidents. The brigade served in Iraq for a year before returning to the United States in early 2004. It was relieved from active military service on 21 April 2004 and reverted to reserve status once again. The brigade is an "AC/RC" (Active Component / Reserve Component) formation.

From 2005 until its inactivation, the brigade had provided detachment and company sized units to active duty combat brigades for use in exercises at the Joint Readiness Training Center at Fort Polk, Louisiana. These exercises were highly varied in nature, and primarily aimed at training those units for future deployment to Iraq. One such unit was the 172nd Stryker Brigade Combat Team, which the brigade provided several company sized units to during their training exercises.

== Honors ==
=== Unit decorations ===
The brigade has never received a unit decoration from the United States military.

=== Campaign streamers ===
Conflict	Streamer	Year(s)
Operation Iraqi Freedom	Iraq	2003–2004
