= 290th Military Police Brigade =

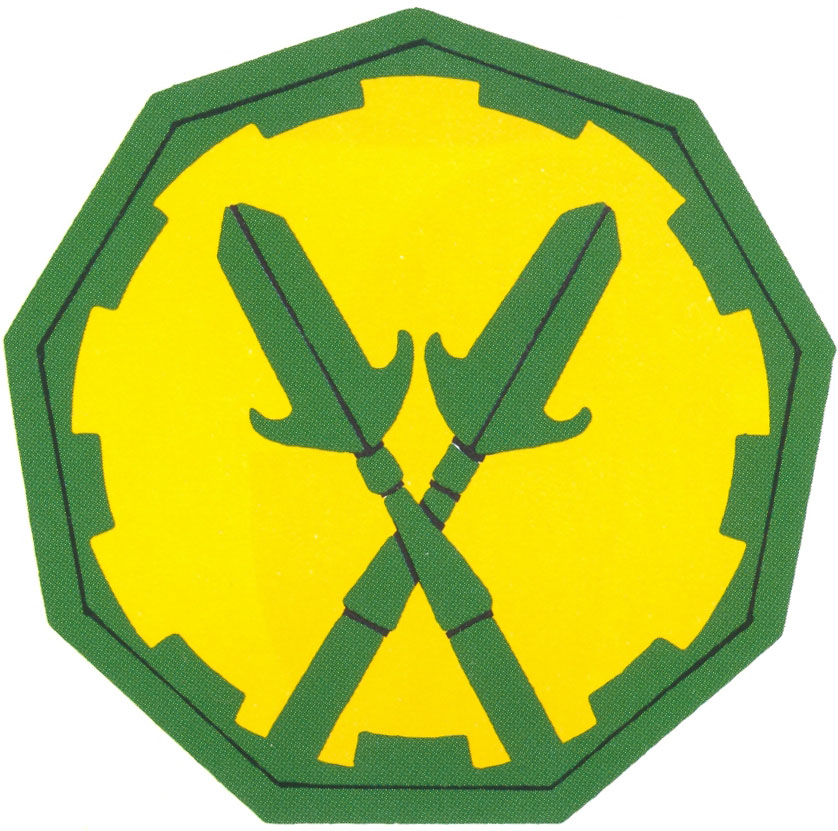
- Shoulder Sleeve Insignia
- Active: November 1, 1971 - present
- Country: United States
- Branch: United States Army Reserve
- Type: Military Police Brigade
- Role: Military Police
- Part of: 200th Military Police Command (United States)
- Garrison/HQ: Nashville, Tennessee
- Motto: Custody with Honor
- Mascot: Titans

Commanders
- Current commander: COL Jason T. Ruffin
- Brigade Command Sergeant Major: CSM Jeffrey R. Culberson

Insignia
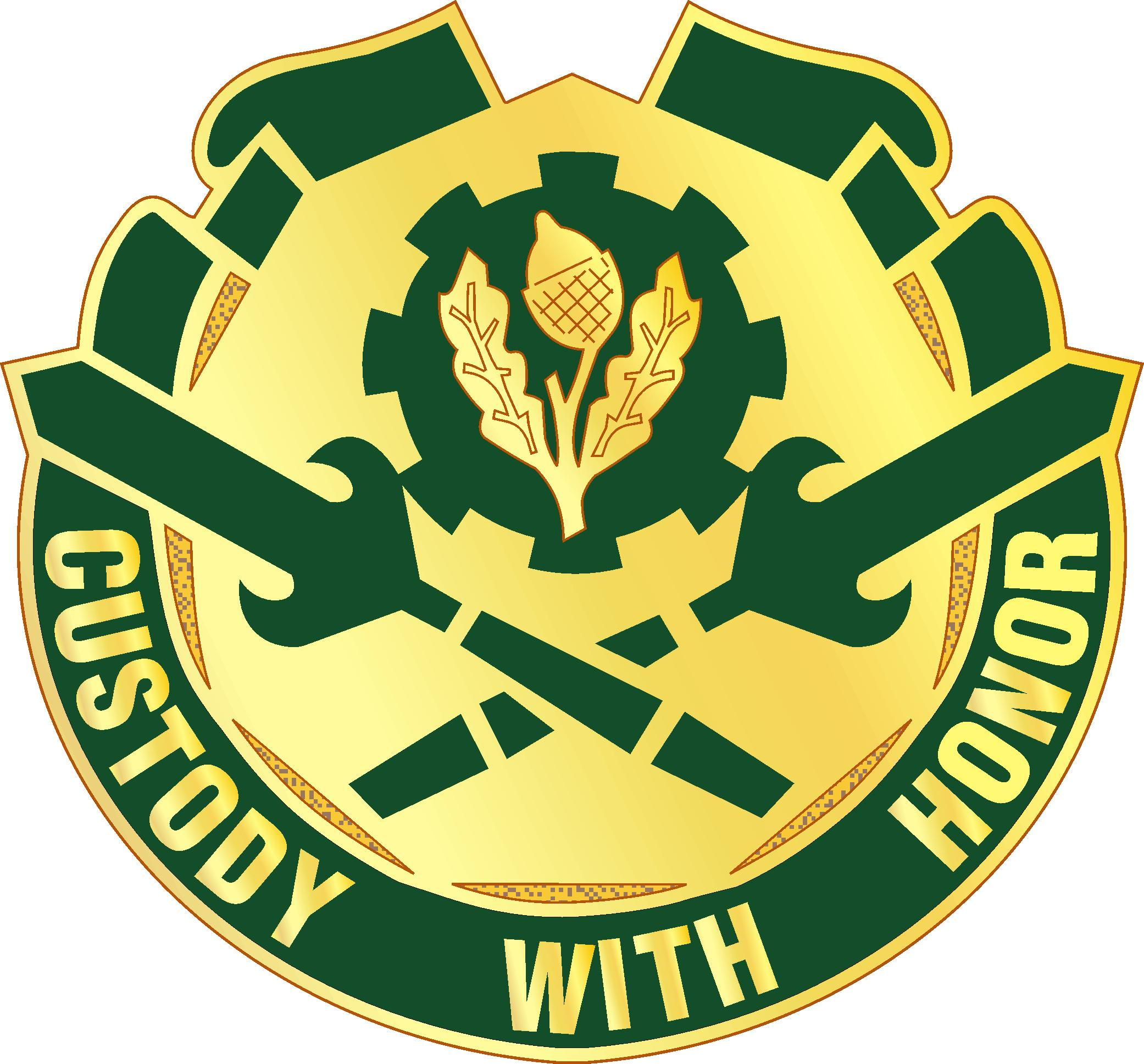
- Distinctive Unit Insignia

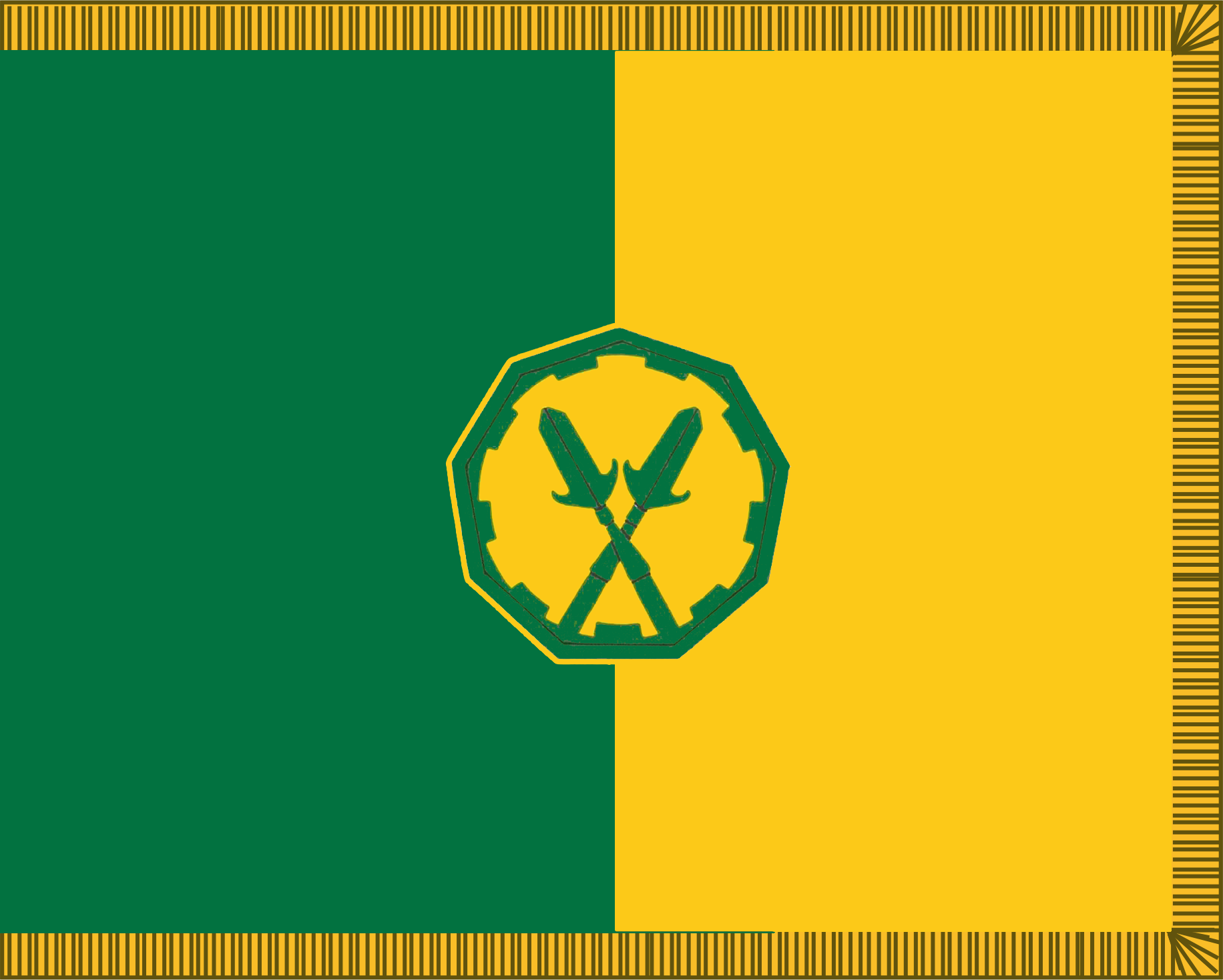
- 290th Military Police Brigade Flag

The 290th Military Police Brigade is a Military Police unit of the United States Army Reserve.

== History ==
- Constituted in the US Army Reserve on 1 November 1971, as HHC, 290th MP Brigade, activated at Nashville, Tennessee and assigned to the Third US Army.
- Reassigned 1 October 1973, to the First United States Army.
- Reassigned to the Second United States Army on 1 October 1983. Inactivated on 15 October 1985, at Nashville, Tennessee.
- Reactivated to the 200th Military Police Command on 17 September 2010.

== Insignia ==
The partizans were medieval weapons. They are crossed to indicate control of exit and entry. The circular embattled area is symbolic of the prisoner of war camps and military security facilities commanded and operated by the brigade. The two partizans, nine sides of the nonagon and circular center allude to the numerical designation (2-9-0) of the unit.

== Organization ==
The brigade is a subordinate unit of the 200th Military Police Command. As of December 2025 the brigade consists of the following units:

- 290th Military Police Brigade, in Nashville (TN)
  - Headquarters and Headquarters Company, in Nashville (TN)
  - 160th Military Police Battalion, in Tallahassee (FL)
    - Headquarters and Headquarters Company, in Tallahassee (FL)
    - 351st Military Police Company (Combat Support), in Ocala (FL)
      - Detachment 1, 351st Military Police Company (Combat Support), in Jacksonville (FL)
    - 602nd Military Police Company (Detention), in Bossier City (LA)
  - 304th Military Police Battalion, in Nashville (TN)
    - Headquarters and Headquarters Company, in Nashville (TN)
    - 354th Military Police Company (General Support), in St. Charles (MO)
    - 449th Military Police Company (Detention), in Nashville (TN)
  - 317th Military Police Battalion, in Tampa (FL)
    - Headquarters and Headquarters Company, in Tampa (FL)
    - 138th Military Police Detachment (Theater Detainee Reporting Center), at Fort Bragg (NC)
    - 304th Military Police Company (Combat Support), in Bluefield (WV)
      - Detachment 1, 304th Military Police Company (Combat Support), in Lewisburg (WV)
    - 346th Military Police Detachment (Detention Camp), in Nashville (TN)
    - 418th Military Police Detachment (Detention Camp), in Orlando (FL)
    - 800th Military Police Company (Combat Support), in El Dorado (AR)
    - Detachment 1, 800th Military Police Company (Combat Support), in Little Rock (AR)
  - 535th Military Police Battalion, in Cary (NC)
    - Headquarters and Headquarters Company, in Cary (NC)
    - 75th Military Police Company (Detention), in Joplin (MO)
    - 88th Military Police Company (General Support), at Joint Base Langley–Eustis (VA)
    - 805th Military Police Company (General Support), in Cary (NC)
      - Detachment 1, 805th Military Police Company (General Support), in Rocky Mount (NC)
  - 724th Military Police Battalion, in Fort Lauderdale (FL)
    - Headquarters and Headquarters Company, in Fort Lauderdale (FL)
    - 320th Military Police Company (Combat Support), in St. Petersburg (FL)
    - 810th Military Police Company (Combat Support), in Tampa (FL)
      - Detachment 1, 810th Military Police Company (Combat Support), in Fort Lauderdale (FL)
      - Detachment 2, 810th Military Police Company (Combat Support), in Cape Coral (FL)
  - 733rd Military Police Battalion (CID), at Fort Gillem (GA)
    - Headquarters and Headquarters Company, at Fort Gillem (GA)
    - 234th Military Police Detachment (CID), at Fort Meade (MD)
    - 307th Military Police Detachment (CID), in Jacksonville (FL)
    - 322nd Military Police Detachment (CID), in Owings Mill (MD)
    - 348th Military Police Detachment (CID), at Joint Base McGuire–Dix–Lakehurst (NJ)
    - 366th Military Police Detachment (CID), in Worcester (MA)
    - 383rd Military Police Detachment (CID), in Lakeland (FL)
