= Kavanaugh stop =

Term for US law enforcement practice

Pedro Vasquez Perdomo v. Kristi Noem
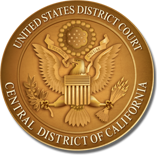
- Court: Central District of California
- Started: June 20, 2025; 16 months ago
- Docket nos.: 2:25-cv-05605 (C.D. Cal.); 25-4312 (9th Cir.); 25A169 (Supreme Court)

Case history
- Appealed to: Ninth Circuit
- Subsequent action: District ruling stayed by Supreme Court via shadow docket

Court membership
- Judge sitting: Maame Ewusi-Mensah Frimpong

September 2025 Supreme Court order

A Kavanaugh stop is a term used to describe immigration enforcement stops in the United States in which federal agents may briefly detain individuals based on reasonable suspicion that may include a combination of factors such as perceived ethnicity, language, location, and occupation, along with other contextual indicators.

The term is associated with Justice Brett Kavanaugh's concurrence in Noem v. Vasquez Perdomo (2025), in which he stated that although apparent ethnicity alone cannot justify a stop, it may be considered as a "relevant factor" among others in determining reasonable suspicion under the Fourth Amendment.

== Origin of the term ==
The term "Kavanaugh stop" originated in a social media post in late September 2025 by Drexel University School of Law Professor Anil Kalhan in which he discussed Kavanaugh's concurring opinion and wrote "... What we might refer to as a 'Kavanaugh stop'". (Note: Kalhan's social media post was made on 27 September 2025, in a Bluesky post.) The term subsequently became widely publicized through media reporting in late 2025.

== History ==
On July 2, 2025, the ACLU filed a lawsuit in federal court against the Trump administration over the ongoing ICE raids in Los Angeles, Vasquez Perdomo v. Noem. The lawsuit was filed on behalf of five Los Angeles County residents—Pedro Vasquez Perdomo, Carlos Alexander Osorto, Isaac Villegas Molina, Jorge Hernandez Viramontes, and Jason Brian Gavidia—who had been stopped and detained by ICE agents in June. Joining the suit in favor of Vasquez Perdomo are multiple immigration advocacy groups, Los Angeles County, and the cities of Los Angeles, Pasadena, Santa Monica, Culver City, Pico Rivera, Montebello, Monterey Park, and West Hollywood.

The lawsuit claimed that the Trump administration was engaging in unconstitutional roundups and raids without reasonable suspicion or probable cause, based on perceived ethnicity, only arresting Hispanic individuals at places of work that predominantly hire Hispanic people, using disproportionate force in carrying immigration enforcement activities, and confining individuals without access to their attorneys.

U.S. District Judge Maame Ewusi-Mensah Frimpong concluded on July 11, 2025, that those who brought the suit were likely to prove "the federal government is indeed conducting roving patrols without reasonable suspicion and denying access to lawyers". The judge ordered the Trump administration to stop immigration arrests without probable cause, alleging that it targeted California residents based on race, language and place of work. DHS was issued a temporary restraining order (TRO) effective immediately. The White House said the DOJ planned to appeal.

=== Court of appeals ===
The United States Court of Appeals for the Ninth Circuit heard arguments on appeal on July 28, 2025 by the DOJ regarding the issued TRO. Hearing the government's profile of roving detentive stops, the three-judge panel questioned the government's reasonable suspicion legal requirement for arrests. The district judge panel issued the appeal ruling on August 1, stating that the broad profile does not supply the reasonable suspicion required to justify a detentive stop: "Reasonable suspicion cannot be based on 'generalizations'" and "the four enumerated factors at issue—apparent race or ethnicity, speaking Spanish or speaking English with an accent, particular location, and type of work, even when considered together— describe only a broad profile and 'do not demonstrate reasonable suspicion for any particular stop'". The TRO would therefore remain in place.

The judges also questioned the "quota" of 3,000 ICE arrests per day policy as it affects roving raids. The DOJ lawyers verified that no such official directive was issued, but that it was verbally issued by Deputy White House Chief of Staff Stephen Miller through media interviews. The ACLU and its plaintiffs filed a motion for an injunction with the district court; a hearing on the motion was scheduled for September 24.

On August 7, 2025, Solicitor General D. John Sauer filed an application of review with the United States Supreme Court to immediately halt judge Frimpong's TRO. The Southern California cities of Long Beach, Pomona, South Gate, Lynwood, Huntington Park, Paramount, Bell Gardens, Beverly Hills, Anaheim, Santa Ana, Santa Barbara, Carpinteria and Oxnard joined LA in the lawsuit.

On September 3, 2025, NBC News reported that the administration was violating the court order per immigrant advocates and local officials, and the ACLU submitted a new motion asking Frimpong to order additional evidence from the federal government "in light of apparent violations" of her order. Residents also filed additional individual lawsuits following continued raids.

=== Supreme Court ===
On September 7, 2025, the Supreme Court issued a brief unsigned order granting the Solicitor General's request for a stay, lifting the TRO restrictions. Three justices dissented from the order, Elena Kagan, Sonia Sotomayor, and Ketanji Brown Jackson.

In a concurring opinion, Justice Brett Kavanaugh argued that while apparent ethnicity alone cannot justify a stop, it may count as a relevant factor along with others when assessing reasonable suspicion under the Fourth Amendment. Kavanaugh stated in his concurring opinion:

To stop an individual for brief questioning about immigration status, the Government must have reasonable suspicion that the individual is illegally present in the United States ... Reasonable suspicion is a lesser requirement than probable cause and "considerably short" of the preponderance of the evidence standard ... Whether an officer has reasonable suspicion depends on the totality of the circumstances ... Here, those circumstances include: that there is an extremely high number and percentage of illegal immigrants in the Los Angeles area; that those individuals tend to gather in certain locations to seek daily work; that those individuals often work in certain kinds of jobs, such as day labor, landscaping, agriculture, and construction, that do not require paperwork and are therefore especially attractive to illegal immigrants; and that many of those illegally in the Los Angeles area come from Mexico or Central America and do not speak much English. To be clear, apparent ethnicity alone cannot furnish reasonable suspicion; under this Court's case law regarding immigration stops, however, it can be a "relevant factor" when considered along with other salient factors. ... Importantly, reasonable suspicion means only that immigration officers may briefly stop the individual and inquire about immigration status. If the person is a U.S. citizen or otherwise lawfully in the United States, that individual will be free to go after the brief encounter. Only if the person is illegally in the United States may the stop lead to further immigration proceedings.

— Pedro Vasquez Perdomo v. Kristi Noem, 606 U.S. ___, slip op. at 5–6 (Sep. 8, 2025) (Kavanaugh, J., concurring)

After that decision, detentions based on the combination of such factors, as described in that opinion, including detentions of US citizens and legal residents, have since been referred to as "Kavanaugh stops". The New York Times described Justice Kavanaugh's concurrence as taking "a step toward upending a half-century of jurisprudence" by giving "a provisional blessing to ... racial profiling by agents seeking out undocumented immigrants."

The case continues through the federal court.

In a separate case, Trump v. Illinois, where the state challenged the use of the National Guard as part of Operation Midway Blitz, the Supreme Court issued an order in December 2025 that upheld a lower court's ruling blocking the use of the National Guard. In this order, Kavanaugh added a concurring statement that clarified his language from the earlier order in Vasquez Perdomo, writing that federal officers "must not make interior immigration stops or arrests based on race or ethnicity". Some legal analysts said that Kavanaugh used the statement to try to corral highly controversial immigration enforcement actions that had occurred since the Vasquez Perdomo order.

== Examples of stops ==
Despite Justice Kavanaugh's statement that persons who are "U.S. citizen[s] or otherwise lawfully in the United States" would be "free to go after the brief encounter" resulting from such stops, news accounts describe detentions of citizens and lawful residents lasting hours or days, with at least one citizen being detained on multiple occasions. Some such "brief encounters" have led to injuries to U.S. citizens.

Justice Sonia Sotomayor, at an April 2026 speaking event, criticized the implication Kavanaugh made that such stops would be brief, as the duration of the stop would make far more of an impact for those working hourly wages compared to professionals on a fixed salary. She said "Those hours that they took you away, nobody's paying that person. And that makes a difference between a meal for him and his kids that night and maybe just cold supper."

Pro Publica identified that more than 500 US citizens had been detained or arrested by ICE between January 2025 and September 2026, many as a result of a Kavanaugh stop, a violation of their constitutional rights.

== See also ==
- Immigration detentions of U.S. citizens in the second Trump administration
- June 2025 Los Angeles protests against mass deportation
- Terry stop
- Human rights in the United States
- Racial profiling
- United Farm Workers v. Noem
