= Immigration detentions of U.S. citizens in the second Trump administration =

- Immigration enforcement actions involving U.S. citizens Part of the deportation in the second Trump administration and immigration policy of the second Trump administration
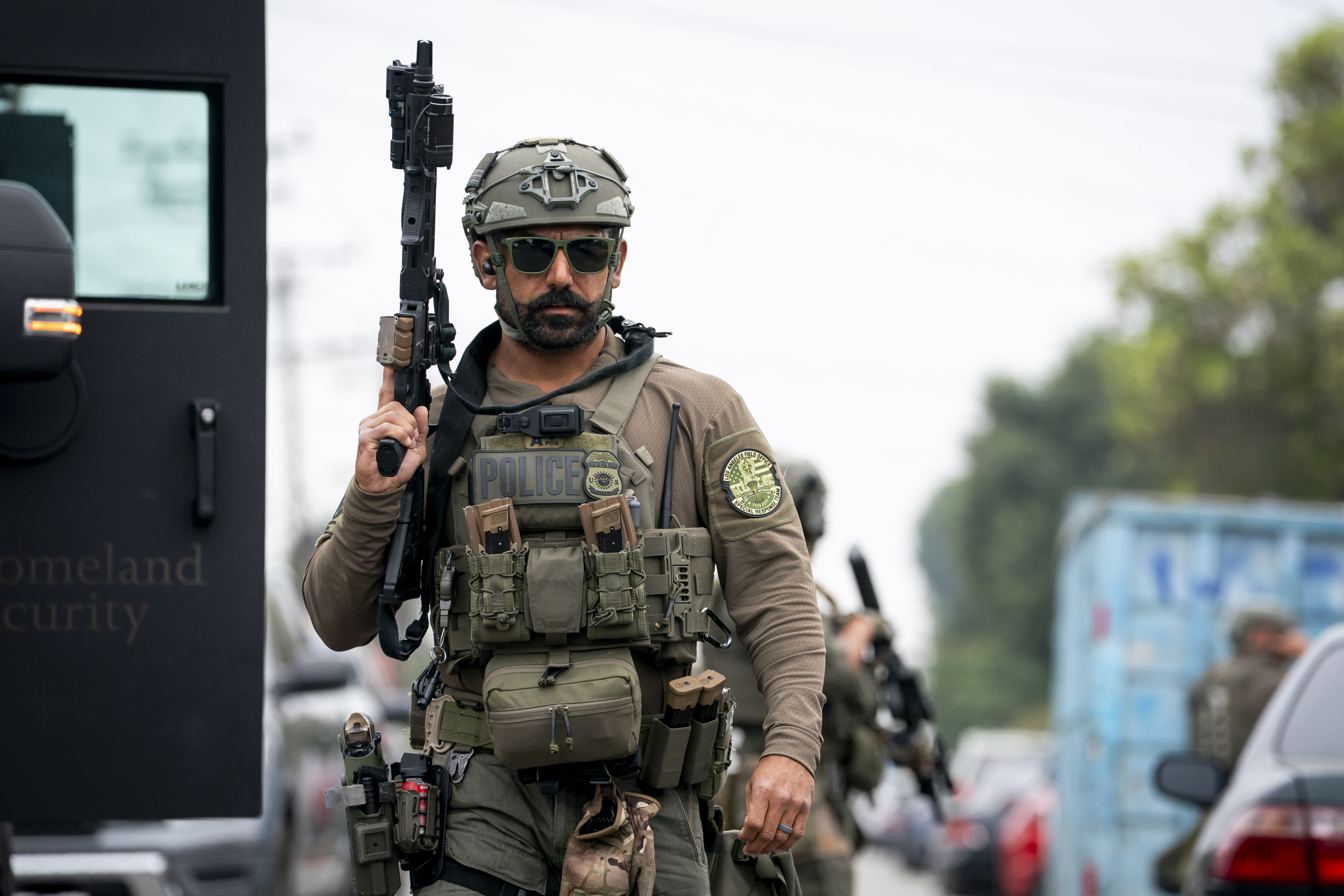
- ICE in Los Angeles, California (June 12, 2025)
- Date: January 20, 2025–present
- Location: United States (nationwide)
- Caused by: Federal immigration enforcement policies and operations affecting U.S. citizens; mass-deportation drive and reduced safeguards described as leading to U.S. citizens being swept up in enforcement actions; right-wing populism, democratic backsliding in the United States
- Goals: Increased immigration enforcement and removals; expansion of detention and denaturalization initiatives (as described in reporting and administration statements)
- Methods: Raids and street detentions; arrests and "collateral arrests"; immigration detention; removal actions; denaturalization proceedings; notices instructing recipients to "self-deport"
- Status: Civil-rights crisis and congressional challenges; court and independent findings described as identifying legal violations in some enforcement practices; public controversy over proposals related to detaining citizens in foreign prisons and expanded denaturalization; mass violations of court orders by Federal government; mass arrests of protesters and political opposition.

Parties
U.S. Federal government; U.S. Department of Homeland Security (DHS); U.S. Immigration and Customs Enforcement (ICE); U.S. Customs and Border Protection (CBP); U.S. Department of Justice (DOJ)	U.S. citizens: Communities; Civil-rights advocates; Political organizations

Lead figures
White House: Donald Trump; JD Vance; Stephen Miller; Tom Homan; Marco Rubio; DHS: Kristi Noem; Troy Edgar; ICE: Todd Lyons; Charles Wall; CBP: Rodney S. Scott; Joseph N. Mazzara; Gregory Bovino; DOJ: Pam Bondi; Todd Blanche; Stanley Woodward Jr.	Non-centralized (multiple individuals and communities)

Casualties and losses
Arrested/detained: none; Dead: none	Arrested/detained: 506+ citizens detained; Dead: 3 U.S. citizens shot and killed by ICE and Border Patrol (Note: U.S. citizen Keith Porter was killed in Los Angeles on December 31, 2025 by an ICE agent. U.S. citizen and Minneapolis, Minnesota resident Renée Good was shot and killed during an ICE operation on January 7, 2026. U.S. citizen Alex Pretti was killed in Minneapolis by ICE agents on January 24, 2026.)

Immigration detentions of U.S. citizens in the second Trump administration were caused by U.S. immigration enforcement actions by agencies including Immigration and Customs Enforcement (ICE) and U.S. Customs and Border Protection (CBP) and involved documented cases in which American citizens were stopped, detained, arrested, or held in custody in connection with immigration operations. Reporting based on official records and court filings has described incidents in which enforcement personnel detained people without first confirming citizenship status, and in which citizens were allegedly subjected to enforcement actions later challenged as unlawful or unsupported by accurate official narratives.

Because the federal government did not maintain a comprehensive public count of citizen detentions, totals have largely been reconstructed through investigative reporting and litigation; ProPublica reported at least 506 citizen detentions through September 2026 and described cases involving alleged force and multi-day detention without access to counsel or communication. Commentators and advocacy groups have argued that the pattern of detentions reflects racial profiling and has contributed to some citizens carrying passports or other proof of citizenship within the United States despite there being no general legal requirement to do so. Other reported cases have involved citizens detained during street encounters, workplace actions, and protests, including military veterans arrested during demonstrations against ICE activity.

== Background ==
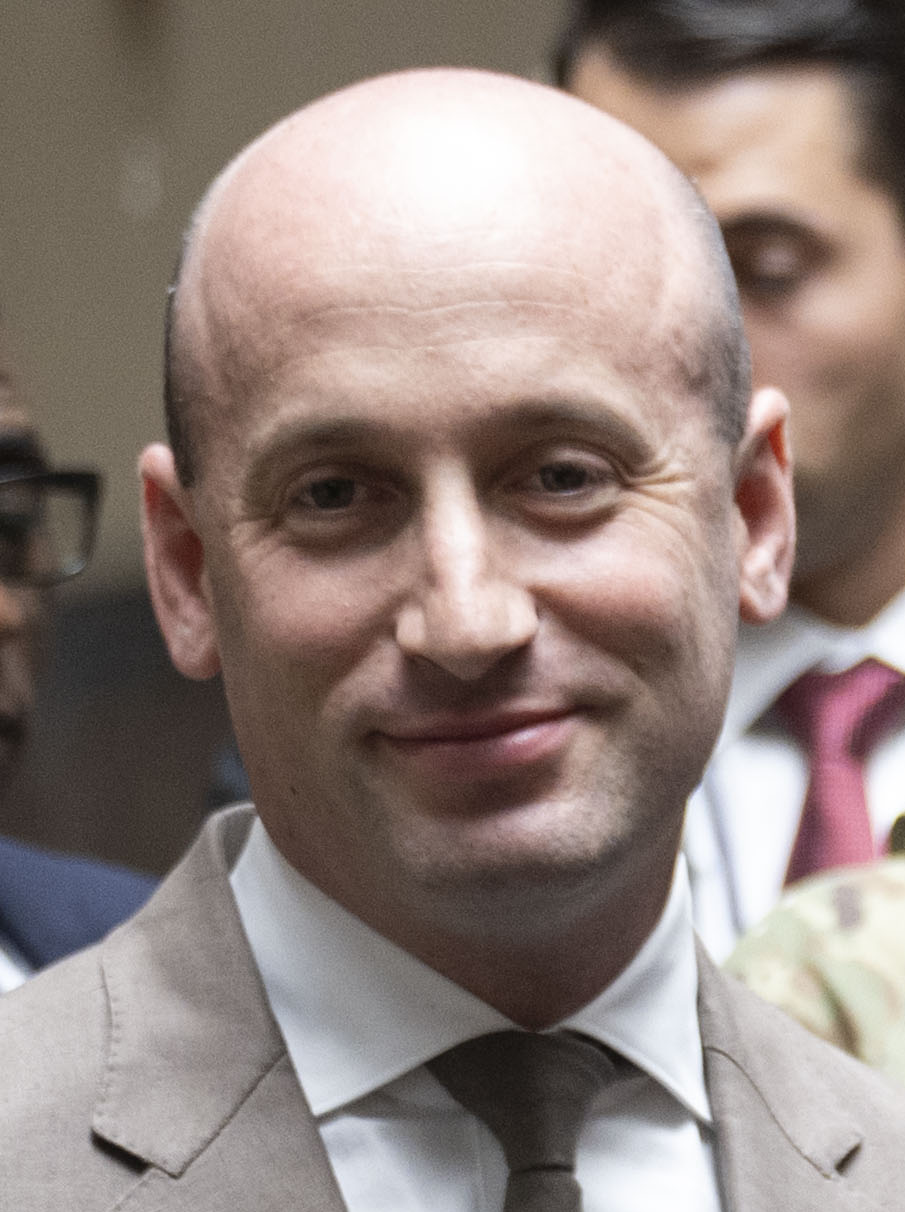
Stephen Miller, Trump's Homeland Security Advisor, was cited by the Cato Institute as responsible for a three-fold increase in the targeting of Hispanic Americans for detention by ICE. The Cato Institute reported that Miller urged raids at "Home Depots or 7-Elevens".

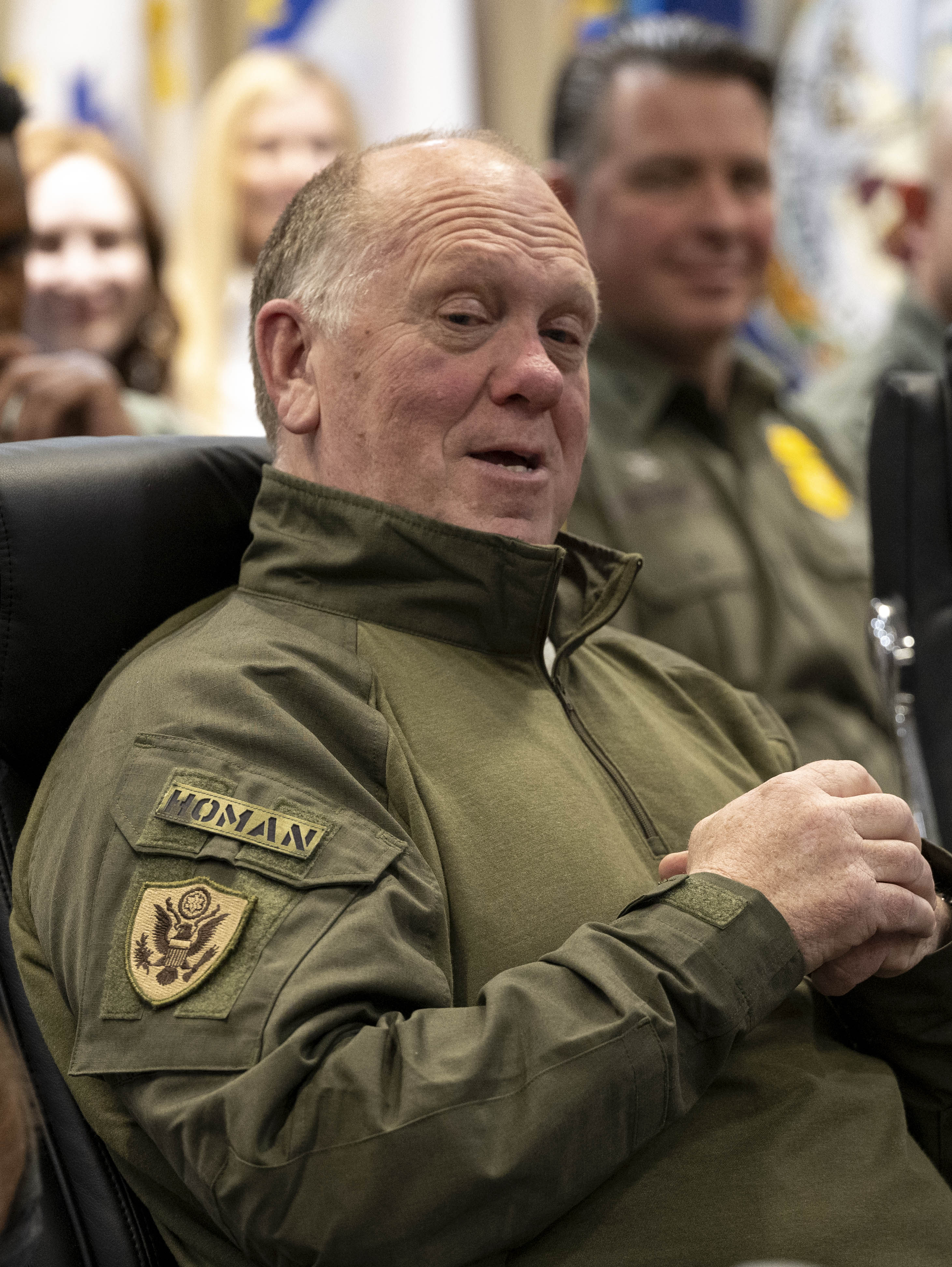
US border czar Tom Homan confirmed "many" American citizens have been arrested by ICE under President Trump.

Dentention is any form of restriction which prevents an individual from leaving a place, or where a person's liberty is restricted. Detentions can be as minor as a traffic stop. As such, detentions of U.S. citizens by law enforcement are extremely common. Most states do not require law enforcement agencies to document routine detentions. California is an exception. Its Racial and Identity Profiling Act of 2015 (RIPA) requires each state and local agency that employs peace officers to annually report every stop to the Attorney General. In 2024, about 5.1 million stops were performed by law enforcement in California alone. Nationwide, tens of millions of detentions result in over 10 million arrests. In contrast, though the U.S. government as of 2025 does not track how many citizens have been detained by immigration agents, ProPublica reported at least 506 U.S. citizen detentions through September 2026. ProPublica further reports that Immigration agents do have authority to detain U.S. citizens in limited circumstances. Agents can hold people whom they reasonably suspect are in the country illegally. They can also can arrest citizens who allegedly interfere with or assault officers.

Cato Institute states that U.S. citizens were tackled and arrested by immigration officials. Cato further states, "the Immigration and Nationality Act itself prohibits ICE and Border Patrol from even interrogating anyone about their right to be in the United States without a warrant or reasonable basis to believe that they are an alien." The Act seems to state the opposite: "Any officer or employee of the Service authorized under regulations prescribed by the Attorney General shall have power without warrant to interrogate any alien or person believed to be an alien as to his right to be or to remain in the United States."

ICE has confirmed in official court records to detaining people without first validating or confirming their citizenship status. The Los Angeles Times reported three witnesses stated that then-acting U.S. Attorney for the Central District of California Bill Essayli screamed at a prosecutor after members of a grand jury refused to indict U.S. citizens against the wishes of U.S. Attorney General Pam Bondi. In one example, immigration officials stated Christian Cerna-Camacho, a U.S. citizen, told an immigration official he was going to "shoot him", physically attacked the official, and initiated a multiple-person foot chase, but video evidence revealed the foot chase did not happen, the Times reported. The DOJ proceeded with prosecuting Cerna-Camacho regardless. On July 11, 2025, U.S. District Judge Maame Ewusi-Mensah Frimpong found roving immigration patrols were illegal due to violating standards of reasonable suspicion of crimes and that the Trump administration was criminally denying detained United States citizens access to required legal counsel. The Guardian found most cases and proceedings filed by immigration officials against U.S. citizens to be false and misleading, and many were dismissed.

In August 2025, it was reported that non-white American citizens in California had begun carrying United States passports domestically in fear of ICE contact and detention. Legal advisors have begun warning citizens in spite of this to consider carrying documents for their own safety, due to documented and ongoing incidents of ICE detaining U.S. citizens. Naturalized citizens also began to warn each other and their communities to carry paper proof of who they are as self-defense against ICE. One naturalized citizen said she at first dismissed her daughters' advice to carry a passport, believing their family was not at risk, although she had heard about instances of others approached by ICE, taken, detained and deported. She only reconsidered when her white, American-born husband, who works in law enforcement, urged her and their daughters to carry proof. While a Real ID compliant form of identification is required for domestic air travel, there is no law or legal requirement for U.S. citizens to carry proof of citizenship within the country. A history teacher is reminded of Japanese-Americans being sent to internment camps, such as Manzanar. Northwest Asian Weekly reported naturalized citizens, including those of Chinese, Korean, and Indian American heritage, leave their homes less frequently due to fear of contact by ICE agents and carry documents such as passports when they do.

Research by ProPublica indicated that in the same year, more than 170 incidents of citizens being detained by immigration officials occurred. In 2025, an additional twenty citizens reported being detained for longer than a day by immigration officials without access to a phone call, legal counsel, or in some cases with their family having no information at all of the whereabouts of their disappeared family. Citizen military veterans of the United States Armed Forces have been prosecuted or sought damages in 2025. In October 2025, The Guardian identified eight instances in which U.S. military veterans had been detained for protesting ICE detentions and operations and accused them of being "Antifa-aligned terrorists". One U.S. Marine Corps veteran sued the government for being tackled from behind and beaten by ICE agents, an incident captured on video. A DHS spokesperson said he has been known to throw rocks at people and the building and falsify injuries using fake blood.

ProPublica has documented that immigration agents have arrested at least 130 American citizens who have allegedly interfered with immigration operations or have been accused of assaulting officers. At least 50 of these cases have yet to yield charges against the individuals or were dismissed outright.

=== Quotas and disregard of probable cause or warrant orders ===
==== Tom Homan ====
Trump's border czar, Tom Homan, confirmed that ICE had made what he described as "collateral arrests" of "many" American citizens.

According to Homan, ICE may detain people "based on the location, their occupation, their physical appearance, their actions like... the person walks away." Homan framed the sharing of the "Know Your Rights" information as "how to escape arrest." Homan said such knowledge was harmful to law enforcement activities.

On August 13, 2025, Homan claimed, "President Trump doesn't have a limitation on his authority to make this country safe. There's no limitation."

==== Stephen Miller ====
The Cato Institute stated that there was a three-fold increase in the targeting of Hispanic Americans by ICE officials after Stephen Miller, the homeland security advisor to Donald Trump instructed the agency to stop "develop[ing] target lists of immigrants" and instead "go out on the street" to immediately detain people at "Home Depots or 7-Elevens". In May 2025, Miller told Fox News, "We are looking to set a goal of a minimum of 3,000 arrests for ICE every day".

== Targeted demographics ==
=== Hispanic and Latino ===
ICE and the Federal government have been accused of specifically targeting Hispanic and Latino members of society, regardless of their citizenship or immigration status. as of July 2025, numerous Latino and Hispanic citizens of the United States have been detained, one for ten days.

90% of targeted individuals were confirmed to be of Latin American heritage directly from analysis of data obtained from ICE officials.

=== Navajo Nation ===
All Navajo people born within the United States are U.S. citizens due to the Indian Citizenship Act of 1924 and the United States Constitution. According to the Navajo Nation, over a dozen indigenous people had been questioned, detained, or asked to provide proof of citizenship by federal law enforcement during immigration raids in January 2025. In some cases, ICE officers were not aware that Certificates of Degree of Indian Blood (CDIB) are proof of citizenship, and one person was detained for nine hours. In another case, eight Native Americans were detained for two hours after their workplace was raided. Their phones were confiscated, and one Navajo woman reported that she was not able to provide proof of citizenship until her phone was returned and she was able to text family, one of whom sent a copy of the woman's CDIB.

Enough Navajos have been stopped by immigration authorities that the nation created a guide with tips about what to do if stopped, encouraging people to always carry identification and that families alert their children about what to do, including having them memorize their Social Security numbers. Other tribes have also issued tips and warnings, and Native News Online published an article, "Native Americans and Immigration Enforcement–Know Your Rights." Navajo Arizona state senator Theresa Hatathlie suggested that tribes contact DHS to share what their travel enrollment card and CDIB look like.

=== Puerto Ricans ===
Puerto Ricans are U.S. citizens as established by the Jones-Shafroth Act (1917), which made Puerto Rico a U.S. territory. In spite of their citizenship, ICE raids detained and arrested Puerto Ricans under the second Trump administration in multiple incidents. In one, a U.S. military veteran from Puerto Rico was detained on January 23, 2025, after an ICE raid at a seafood warehouse in Newark, New Jersey. The veteran worked there as a warehouse manager. The co-owner of the business said that ICE appeared to be targeting people who look Hispanic, while ignoring his white employees.

In another notable incident, three members of a Puerto Rican family were taken to a detention center in Milwaukee, Wisconsin, on January 27, 2025, after an immigration officer heard one of them speaking Spanish. They were released prior to processing when they provided documentation. ICE claimed the incident did not happen. There have been a significant upswing in passport requests from Puerto Ricans to provide documentation to satisfy immigration officers.

== Identified citizens ==
=== Willy Aceituno ===
A citizen of the U.S. born in Honduras, Willy Aceituno, stated that he was stopped by U.S. Border Patrol agents in a Charlotte, North Carolina parking lot on November 15, 2025. After a "playful" engagement with federal agents for 15 minutes, which he said he did to distract them from migrants in the vicinity, he confirmed his U.S. citizenship. He entered his truck but was confronted by a second group of agents who banged on and broke his window, removed him from his truck, handcuffed him and placed him in a vehicle for 20 minutes before releasing him.

=== Nasra Ahmed ===
On January 14, 2026, Somali-American Saint Paul native Nasra Ahmed was leaving her apartment to pick up a prescription when two Somali men ran past her, pursued by federal agents. Despite showing the agents her ID, she was detained and put in a detention cell alongside a Native American woman. During her time in custody, Ahmed suffered a seizure and was hospitalized. She was released after two days in custody. On January 21, she made a viral speech about her identity at a press conference, explaining: "[Being Somali] is kind of like bananas and rice. People don't think you can eat bananas with rice, but that's what it's like to be Somali and American." On January 28, Ahmed was arrested again for allegedly assaulting federal law enforcement, along with 15 others, while participating in an anti-ICE protest.

=== Rodrigo Almendarez ===
A natural-born citizen of Canoga Park, California, Rodrigo Almendarez, was detained by ICE agents at his place of employment in Simi Valley in August 2025. The agents did not identify themselves to Almendarez as ICE agents, or speak to him before handcuffing and detaining him on sight. The action against Almendarez was so aggressive that ICE agents failed to put their truck into park, leaving it in drive mode with brakes disabled. This caused the agents to have to chase their own vehicle running by foot down the street to catch it as well; the vehicle then impacted, shattering a side mirror. Almendarez was ultimately released without charge after the agents viewed his ID and were challenged by a coworker.

=== Cary López Alvarado ===
U.S. citizen Cary López Alvarado was arrested by ICE agents alongside two undocumented immigrants, one of whom was her partner, on June 8, 2025. López Alvarado was born in Los Angeles at Hollywood Hospital along with her cousin Alberto Sandoval, who is also a citizen. She reported experiencing intense pains in her stomach after she was arrested and later went to the hospital to be monitored after her release. The DHS said that Alvarado was arrested for blocking access to a car containing the undocumented immigrants; Alvarado denied resisting, saying, "I can't fight back; I'm pregnant." Footage shows her telling agents that they needed to leave because they were on private property. Other footage shows her refusing to "move away" upon an agent's request. Alvarado was released from custody not long after her arrest.

During the incident with ICE, Alvarado was "violently detained", shackled in chains across her pregnant torso, and went into labor with the baby prematurely due to the attack by federal agents.

=== Jairin Anzaldúa-Ervin ===
Jairin Anzaldúa-Ervin, age 29, of Gervais, Oregon was arrested by ICE agents who claimed that he threw a water bottle at them during a protest in Portland, Oregon on October 4, 2025. Video online showed ICE agents dog-piling on top of him and placing their knees on his ribs during his arrest. His wife was tracking his phone's location while he was at the protest, and stated that the tracking ceased to show his location around 1:00 a.m. Nearly 20 hours later, she learned what had happened when she saw videos of his arrest online. A federal magistrate allowed Anzaldúa-Ervin to be charged with alleged assault on a federal officer. Anzaldúa-Ervin pleaded guilty and was sentenced December 16 to two days time served, a $25 fine, and one year of probation.

=== Bachir Atallah ===
Naturalized U.S. citizen and Trump supporter Bachir Atallah was detained by the CBP in April 2025 while returning from a family trip to Canada. Atallah confirmed to the officials that he had a Redress Control Number issued by the Department of Homeland Security, which confirms the specific identity of a citizen who has been repeatedly targeted by immigration officials. Despite this, Atallah was handcuffed and separated from his wife, also a U.S. citizen, at gunpoint. The officials refused to grant Atallah access to legal counsel for over three hours, despite his repeated requests for access to legal representation.

Atallah reported to NBC10 Boston that he was forced under medical duress to write a statement that he authorized access to his electronic devices. Despite being an attorney and citing attorney-client privilege, the officials coerced Atallah into surrendering access to his computer and email systems. Emergency medical reports from the time indicated he began to experience medical distress.

=== Emerson Ayala ===
In Danbury Township, Ohio, U.S. citizen Emerson Ayala was detained by Border Patrol while working at his construction job on June 19, 2025. Ayala was recording the detention of some of his coworkers on his cellphone, and then approached by a Border Patrol agent, who asked, "Are you illegal?" Ayala was wearing a construction safety harness, which a Border Patrol agent grabbed. The agent did not inform Ayala that he was being detained before putting his hands on him. Ayala was transported to Ottawa County Jail and charged with allegedly assaulting a federal agent.

=== Elianne Bahena and Jacqueline Lopez ===
On October 22, 2025, ICE detained seven people, including Elianne Bahena and Jacqueline Lopez, two members of alderman Michael Rodriguez's staff who are U.S. citizens, in a raid on the border of Little Village, Chicago, and Cicero, Illinois.

=== Ras Baraka ===
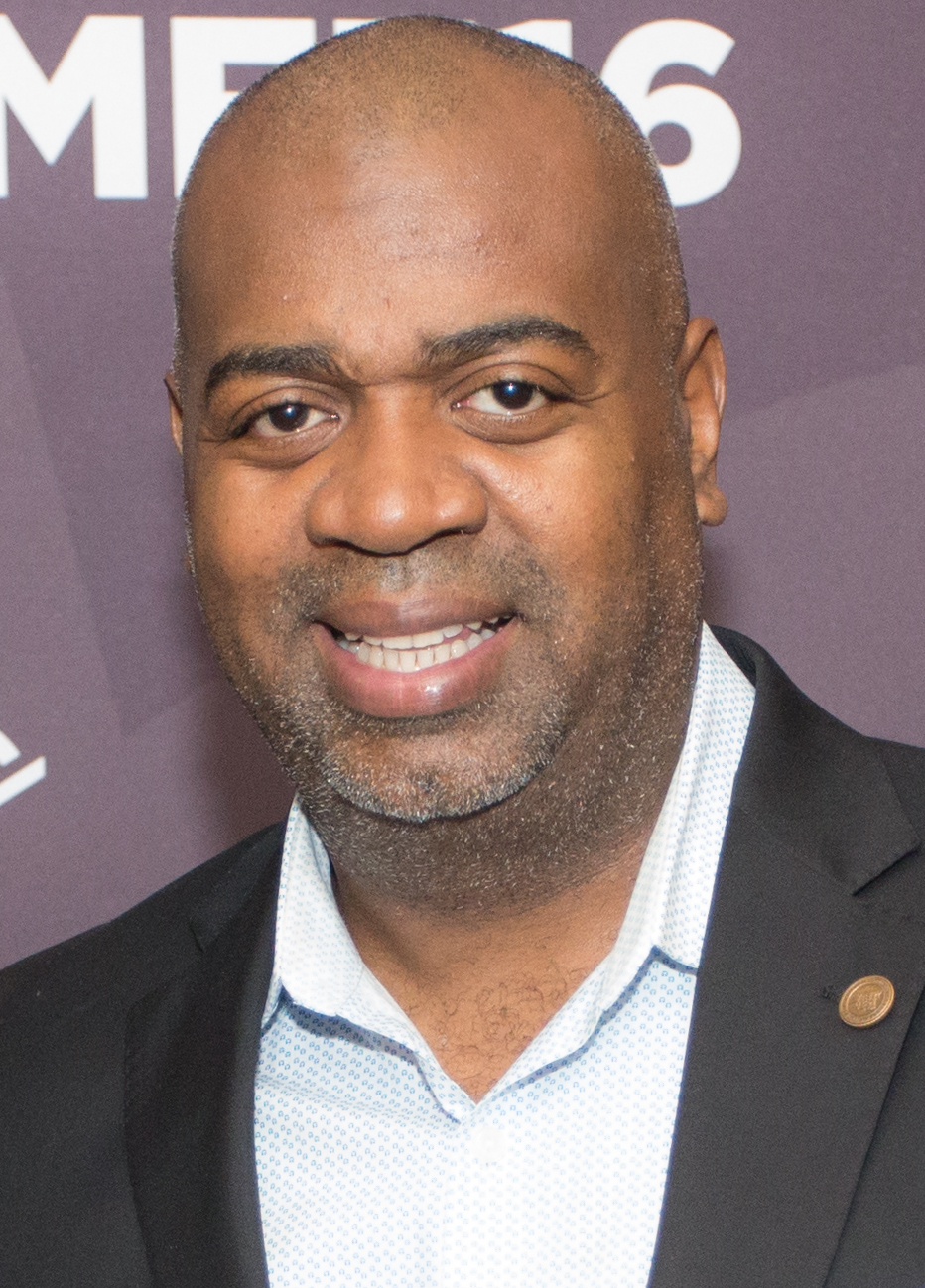
Ras Baraka, mayor of Newark, New Jersey, was detained by ICE. Baraka is a U.S. citizen.

The mayor of Newark, New Jersey was detained by ICE. On May 9, 2025, Ras Baraka was arrested by agents outside of the Delaney Hall ICE facility. Interim U.S. Attorney Alina Habba said Baraka was arrested because he "committed trespass and ignored multiple warnings from Homeland Security Investigations to remove himself from the ICE detention center." Baraka attempted to join a congressional delegation conducting oversight, was denied entry by an ICE official, and then Baraka exited the secure area of the facility and returned to stand on public property; however, minutes later, the agents surrounded Baraka, handcuffed him, and brought him inside the facility.

In a press conference after the arrest, Democratic House representative Rob Menendez said ICE agents "feel no restraint on what they should be doing, and that was shown in broad daylight today." At Baraka's initial court appearance, he was charged with allegedly trespassing and was later released on the same day of his arrest. After release, he told waiting supporters, "The reality is this: I didn't do anything wrong."

=== Arnoldo Bazan ===
Immigration agents pulled over 16-year-old US citizen Bazan and his undocumented father in Houston on October 23, 2025. Bazan's father then led the agents on a car pursuit. Balzan's father stopped and fled into a nearby restaurant supply store, with Bazan following, filming on his phone. Agents restrained Bazan's father, with one putting their knee on his back. Another allegedly put Balzan in a chokehold, against DHS regulations.

=== Joe Botello ===
Joe Botello, a citizen born in Texas, was detained by DHS Secretary Kristi Noem and ICE agents in Elgin, Illinois, on September 16, 2025. Botello informed ICE of his citizenship and birth status with documentation prior to his detention. Noem herself was personally present at Botello's capture. The Chicago Sun-Times reported that Federal agents forced their way into the citizen's home before 5:30 a.m. local time. Noem posted a video that included Botello's detention on social media, claiming, "DHS took violent offenders off the streets with arrests for assault, DUI and felony stalking." Botello had not committed a crime and was later released; Noem did not clarify in her posting of his arrest and detention that Botello was an innocent citizen. The Chicago Tribune revealed Federal records proving DHS and ICE had kept Botello under surveillance prior to detaining him. Federal agents also detained another citizen during the raid on Botello's home.

=== Debbie Brockman ===
Debbie Brockman, a U.S. citizen and an employee of WGN-TV, was detained by federal agents in the Lincoln Square neighborhood of Chicago on October 10, 2025. She was detained for seven hours after videotaping agents detaining a Latino man and asking if they had a warrant. DHS alleges that Brockman threw objects at a Border Patrol vehicle. On October 14, Brockman's attorney released a statement saying that Brockman was pursuing legal action against ICE and the Department of Homeland Security for assault and wrongful arrest. On June 2, 2026, Brockman's attorneys filed a Federal Tort Claims Act claim against the federal government for assault and battery, false imprisonment, false arrest and intentional infliction of emotional distress, seeking $10 million in damages.

=== Rev. Kenny Callaghan ===
Rev. Kenny Callaghan, a southern California native, stated that on January 7, 2026, ICE detained him as he was observing a protest near where ICE agent Jonathan Ross shot and killed Renée Good. Callaghan observed ICE agents approach a young Hispanic woman, and told them "take me instead of her, I am not afraid of you", as the agents "pointed a gun in [his] face". ICE agents handcuffed him, placed him in an ICE vehicle and asked for his identification and cell phone. When he asked if he was being arrested, they walked away. Callaghan stated ICE agents asked him, "are you afraid yet?" and remarked, "well, you're white, you wouldn't be fun anyway." After about 30 minutes Callaghan was released without charge.

=== Jose Castillo ===
American citizen Jose Castillo was pursued and arrested by U.S. Border Patrol officers in Sacramento, California, during immigration actions on July 17, 2025. Castillo was accused by Border Patrol agents of slashing one of their tires. Castillo pleaded guilty to the “willful injury and depredation” of U.S. property and sentenced to one year of probation and restitution of $478.

=== Jose Castro ===
ICE and CBP detained naturalized U.S. citizen Jose Castro, who is originally from Ecuador, on June 18, 2025, in Rochester, New York. During the arrest, recorded by tourists and onlookers, the agents refused identification from Castro and detained him regardless.

=== Wilmer Chavarria ===
Wilmer Chavarria, the superintendent of schools for Winooski, Vermont and a U.S. citizen, was detained by CBP officials and interrogated at a Houston airport on July 21, 2025. Chavarria was returning from a visit to Nicaragua with his husband, who was not detained during the incident. Chavarria was born and raised in Nicaragua, but became a U.S. citizen in 2018. Officials told Chavarria that he had no rights, disputed that he was married, and challenged his employment as an educator in Vermont. Afterward, his Global Entry status to travel out of the United States was revoked with no explanation given. Chavarria is a board member of the Los Alamos National Laboratory Foundation. In December 2025, Chavarria filed a lawsuit challenging the warrantless search and seizure of electronic devices at the border.

=== Jeury Concepcion ===
On May 6, 2026, ICE agents tackled and detained 19-year-old U.S. citizen Jeury Concepcion in the Bronx, putting him in a vehicle. Video of his detainment was captured by a bystander. Concepcion said agents realized they had made a mistake after looking at his ID and phone, before dropping him off at a park. Representative Ritchie Torres called for an investigation into Concepcion's detainment.

=== Ernesto Diaz ===
Ernesto Diaz, a 23-year-old U.S. citizen, was handcuffed and threatened with a taser by masked ICE agents in late September 2025 in Chicago, after the start of Operation Midway Blitz. The agents threw his wallet on the ground and drove away after checking his identification. Diaz believes that he was targeted because he is Hispanic and dark-skinned, and began carrying his identification documents daily before the incident because of the uptick in ICE activity nationwide.

=== Dulce Consuelo Diaz Morales ===
Dulce Consuelo Diaz Morales was detained by ICE on December 14, 2025, after they pulled her over in Baltimore, Maryland. Diaz Morales' lawyers said they have a birth certificate stating she was born in Laurel, Maryland, as well as other proof of citizenship. Diaz Morales claims to have been living in Mexico from the age of 7. According to her family and lawyers, she moved to the U.S. in 2023 due to threats of cartel violence in Mexico. According to her lawyers, she did not have the proper paperwork when she entered the U.S. and was incorrectly processed as an immigrant. According to her lawyers, she has never been denaturalized.

A DHS representative stated, "[Diaz Morales] did not provide a valid U.S. birth certificate or any evidence in support of her claim that she is a U.S. citizen." According to her lawyers, ICE claims all her documents are forged. Her case went viral after Victoria Slatton, one of Diaz Morales' lawyers, shared information about the detention on TikTok.

Diaz Morales told WRC-TV she holds dual citizenship with Mexico and is in the process of applying for a U.S. passport. On December 18, 2025, a federal judge issued an order to prohibit the deportation of Diaz Morales. Diaz Morales was released on January 7, 2026, after 25 days in detention. On January 13 she had her first check-in with ICE. She was forced to wait for 8 hours. ICE set the condition that she had to wear an ankle monitor before being allowed to go home.

Diaz Morales received an American passport on June 1, 2026, and on June 16 the government dropped the case.

=== George and Esmeralda Doilez ===
U.S. citizens George and Esmeralda Doilez, who both voted for Donald Trump, were detained by U.S. Border Patrol officers on August 6, 2025. They were being followed by an unmarked SUV while en route to the dentist, before pulled over by masked, plainclothes officials with weapons. The Doilezes were told they were detained due to a "known alien out in the area".

The Doilezes stated that they were "exploring the area" and "scoping out campsites on their way to the dentist." The U.S. Border Patrol blamed the couple for the detention, saying, "If you have a dentist appointment, it probably wasn't the best decision to be out in the middle of nowhere." Esmeralda reported to NBC News that she feared the agents might kill George during the encounter. A Border Patrol agent threatened to seize their vehicle and cite them for their possession of legally purchased cannabis. The couple accused the agents of racial profiling and violating their constitutional rights. Both regretted voting for Trump repeatedly, with George saying, "I feel shame, guilt and anger at the same time because of the promises that he made that he lied to us about, going after the worst of the worst. He lied on those and he stole our vote."

=== Brandon Domena ===
On July 23, 2026, Domena was in a crowd of people watching ICE detain a Mexican national in Passaic, New Jersey. Domena and an agent got into a confrontation, and agents threw him to the ground and arrested him. DHS said agents detained a man for assault and resisting, though Domena was not charged with anything. Domena said he was taken to an unknown facility, possibly Delaney Hall, and was deprived of water and a bathroom before being released.

=== Isaac Dominguez ===
Isaac Dominguez, a U.S. citizen, was detained by ICE agents in Anaheim, California in August 2025. The agents initially claimed Dominguez attacked them in a car wash, but then released him without charges. Dominguez, who is "proudly" Black and Mexican, attributed the arrest to racial profiling, saying, "they're just attacking Hispanic people, Hispanic-looking people" regardless of documentation status.

=== Jose Dominguez ===
Jose Dominguez, a U.S. citizen from Chicago, was forcibly removed from his vehicle, slammed to the ground, choked and struck as Border Patrol agents handcuffed him on November 6, 2025, after he told them he was a U.S. citizen. He was detained for an unspecified amount of time, released without charges and treated at a hospital for his injuries. He and four other plaintiffs filed a civil lawsuit against federal agents on July 2, 2026.

=== Darren Eichler, Daniel Greer and Cordell Walls ===
Darren Eichler, Daniel Greer, and Cordell Walls, along with one other U.S. citizen, were detained by ICE agents at a cemetery in Forest Park, Illinois where they worked on October 7, 2025. The four citizens were attempting to help two men, whom ICE was attempting to detain, who were struggling in the Des Plaines River near the cemetery's border. ICE agents pepper sprayed them before tackling, zip-tying and shackling them. On July 29, 2026, two of the cemetery workers filed claims against the federal government seeking 1 million dollars in compensation each, under the Federal Tort Claims Act.

=== Halima Elmi ===
US citizen Halima Elmi told the Minnesota Reformer that masked ICE agents in a black van had detained her and her daughter as they were entering a Minneapolis, Minnesota car rental business during Operation Metro Surge. After car rental employees informed the agents they were not allowed on private property and the detainees produced their US passports, they were released.

=== Mahamed Eydarus ===
Eydarus, an American of Somali descent, was helping his mother shovel snow from her Minneapolis driveway when agents approached and asked why they were speaking a foreign language. The agents left after the two showed the agents their identification.

=== Dariana Fajardo ===
Dariana Fajardo, a U.S. citizen, was detained by ICE agents in Waukegan, Illinois on October 6, 2025. They claimed she was trying to box in ICE vehicles, a claim she and community leaders denied. ICE agents ignored her U.S. passport as proof of citizenship during her arrest, leaving it in her vehicle.

=== Dayanne Figueroa ===
Dayanne Figueroa, a U.S. citizen in Chicago, was dragged out of her car and detained by ICE following a vehicle collision on October 10, 2025. A DHS secretary claimed Figueroa used her vehicle to block agents while honking her horn. According to DHS, when agents drove away, Figueroa used her car to ram the agent's vehicle. Figueroa was arrested for assault on a federal agent. Due to the physical altercation, Figueroa had to return to the hospital where she had recently had kidney surgery.

=== Jessie Fuentes ===
Alderwoman Jessie Fuentes of Chicago, a Puerto Rican U.S. citizen, was handcuffed by federal agents inside an ER on October 3, 2025 after she refused to leave. Agents threatened her with arrest before releasing her outside of the hospital. On October 21, Fuentes filed an administrative claim against the Department of Homeland Security under the Federal Tort Claims Act, seeking $100,000 in personal injury damages.

=== Job Garcia ===
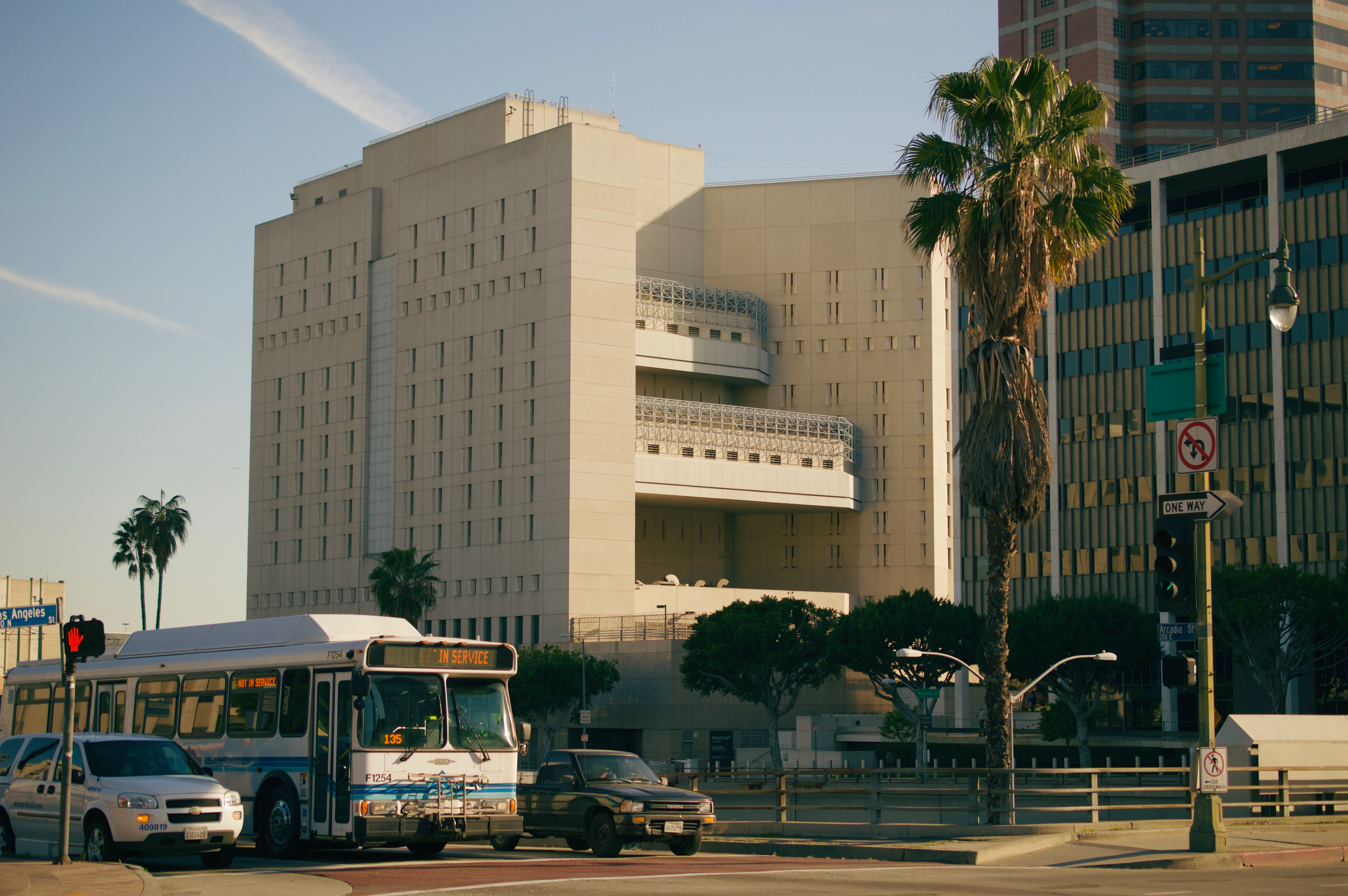
Job Garcia, a U.S. citizen, was detained by ICE and held in captivity in the Metropolitan Detention Center, Los Angeles.

Garcia, a graduate student and part-time delivery worker, was swept up during an ICE raid at the Home Depot in Hollywood, Los Angeles on June 18, 2025. Garcia witnessed agents smashing another man's car window and was arrested after he began recording the incident. He was physically beaten by ICE agents, brought to Dodger Stadium alongside 30 other detainees and was held at the Metropolitan Detention Center in Los Angeles for 24 hours before being released. Garcia said that agents considered charging him with assaulting a federal officer but decided against it when video of the arrest became public.

=== Jason Brian Gavidia ===
Jason Brian Gavidia, an American citizen, was videotaped being detained in June 2025 in his hometown of Montebello, California by ICE agents who twisted his arm while asking him, "What hospital were you born at?" The mayor of Montebello, Salvador Melendez, said in response to the incident: "This is racial profiling. They're stopping folks because of the way they look...ICE agents are terrorizing our community. They are taking actions and asking questions later. There is absolutely no due process.

In August 2025, Gavidia joined a lawsuit challenging immigration enforcement tactics. Gavidia, a former Trump supporter and voter, accused the President of lying and "brainwashing" the United States, and stated that he regretted supporting Trump.

=== Edwin Godinez and Yair Napolés ===
Godinez and Napolés, stepbrothers and U.S. citizens, were detained by ICE in Salisbury, North Carolina on January 5, 2026. The two had learned that two of their co-workers at their family's construction business had been detained by ICE, so they responded to the scene to pick up a work vehicle that was left behind. ICE agents stopped them nearby and attempted to grab Godinez's phone. After attempting to remove the two from their vehicle and apparently striking Godinez, the ICE agents left.

=== Ricardo Gonzalez ===
ICE agents assaulted US citizen Ricardo Gonzalez in mid-October 2026 as he was riding his e-bike through his Long Beach, California neighborhood, breaking his arm. Agents claimed Gonzalez had thrown an object at their vehicles. They then forced him face-down on the street, kneeling on his back and attempting to handcuff him. When neighbors gathered to protest the detention, demanded to see a warrant and blocked agents and their vehicles, one agent told them they didn't "look legal." Agents briefly detained two female protesters, both US citizens, and placed them in the back of their vehicles. Federal agents called local law enforcement for assistance; after they arrived and identified Gonzalez as a US citizen he was released and taken to a hospital.

=== Maria Greeley ===
Maria Greeley, a 44-year-old U.S. citizen of Chicago, was detained by ICE in October 2025, who surrounded her on her way home from work, forced her hands behind her back and zip-tied her. They questioned her for an hour, refused to answer questions and accused her of lying when she produced her passport as proof of citizenship, telling her that she "doesn't look like" a Greeley. Greeley attributed the incident to racial profiling, stating, "I am Latina and I am a service worker. I fit the description of what they're looking for now."

=== Angelica Guerrero ===
After allegedly slashing an ICE van's tire, U.S. citizen Angelica Guerrero was detained by ICE agents in San Francisco, California in August 2025, and was denied access to legal representation or a phone call for 24 hours. Guerrero was tackled by a federal agent, not read her rights, and detained outside of an ICE facility during a small protest on San Francisco municipal property. Guerrero was detained in the Santa Rita Jail in Dublin, California. Guerrero was charged for interfering with federal agents and destruction of property. The Partnership for Civil Justice Fund stated that the agents violated "multiple laws" in the detention of Guerrero. Guerrero plead guilty to damaging U.S. government property. She was sentenced to two years of probation and $1,200 restitution.

=== Jonathan Guerrero ===
Jonathan Guerrero, a 21-year-old Mexican American U.S. citizen born in Philadelphia, was detained by ICE while working at a car wash in January 2025. ICE agents aimed firearms at him and then handcuffed him, along with several of his coworkers. Agents released Guerrero after checking his ID.

=== Ernesto Campos Gutierrez ===
In Bakersfield, California, U.S. citizen Ernesto Campos Gutierrez was detained by Border Patrol agents in January 2025; the incident was recorded on video. During his detention, agents flattened all the tires on his work truck with knives, arrested Campos Gutierrez for having a non-citizen in the truck, and then released him hours later with no charges.

=== Samuel Guzmán ===
On June 7, 2026, ICE agents detained Samuel Guzmán in Annapolis, Maryland for two hours. Guzmán said ICE agents took his phone, car keys and wallet during his detainment. ICE said he was detained for driving a car registered to an illegal immigrant; Guzmán said he had purchased his car from an acquaintance and had not registered it in his name yet.

=== Jose Hermosillo ===
Nineteen-year-old U.S. citizen Jose Hermosillo, a resident of the state of New Mexico, was arrested by the U.S. Customs and Border Protection (CBP) in Tucson, Arizona, on April 8, 2025, while visiting his girlfriend's family. (Note: Court documents incorrectly state that Jose Hermosillo was arrested in Nogales, Arizona; an affidavit posted on X by the Department of Homeland Security correctly states the arrest occurred in Tucson. Hermosillo said that he has never been to Nogales.) Hermosillo was falsely arrested for illegally entering the country while walking near the Border Patrol headquarters. Upon learning of his detention in Florence Correctional Center, a privately owned prison in Florence, Arizona, a member of Hermosillo's girlfriend's family drove to the facility with Hermosillo's Social Security card and birth certificate but was not given any information or allowed to effectuate his release.

The government claimed that Hermosillo had said that he was a Mexican citizen, said that he had entered the country illegally through Nogales, and said that he was planning to stay for 20 years to work. According to an anonymous United States Department of Homeland Security (DHS) official, Hermosillo then signed a statement with those facts. Hermosillo's family and girlfriend say that he has a learning disability and is illiterate. The charging document states that Hermosillo either read the document or had it read to him, but Hermosillo states that it was never read to him.

According to Hermosillo, the Border Patrol's version of events is false. He says that he had a seizure and was taken to a hospital by an ambulance without his state ID card. He says that after being released from the hospital, he got lost and went to a police officer for help. The police officer asked where he was from and he said that he was from "New Mexico". The officer, who worked for the Border Patrol, responded "Don't make me [out] like [I'm] stupid. I know you're from Mexico", and arrested him, according to Hermosillo. He says that he told prison staff that he was a U.S. citizen several times, and was told "call your lawyer." He denies that ICE officers read him the document that was signed with his first name.

Hermosillo was detained for a total of ten days before being released on April 17. In an interview after his release, Hermosillo stated that, "They were saying I'm from Mexico, but I'm a U.S. citizen." Arizona Attorney General Kris Mayes investigated Hermosillo's detention by immigration authorities, requesting information about the incident from Immigration and Customs Enforcement. "It is wholly unacceptable to wrongfully detain U.S. citizens", Mayes said in a statement.

=== Mubashir Khalif Hussen ===
At a press conference on December 9, 2025, a man identifying himself as Mubashir stated ICE agents had chased him, put him in a choke hold and dragged and pushed him into a car even though he told them he was a U.S. citizen; video of the incident also showed bystanders confronting the agents. ICE then drove him to a federal building in Bloomington where they fingerprinted him. After showing ID he was released and told to walk home.

=== Phillip James ===
In 2025, Phillip James, also known by the name Felibi Siagha-Coke, was detained by ICE and held at the Speedway Slammer in Indiana. Immigration authorities detained James, who has schizophrenia, based on his claim that he was born in Jamaica and entered the country illegally, coming to the agency's attention after applying for U.S. citizenship. He was listed under the name Felibi Siagha-Coke, which he had recently adopted. James has also claimed to be the illegitimate son of a former Jamaican prime minister and a descendant of Lebanese royalty, and documents show that he was actually born in Florida.

=== Carlos Jimenez ===
On October 30, 2025, US citizen Carlos Jimenez approached ICE officers carrying out an operation near a school bus stop in Ontario, California and informed them children would soon be arriving in the vicinity. One ICE officer later identified as Eusebio Ortiz pointed his gun at Jimenez and threatened to shoot him if he did not leave. As Jimenez was turning his car around, Ortiz fired multiple shots into his car, hitting him in the back and right shoulder. FBI officers followed Jimenez to a nearby hospital, interfering with his medical care, detaining him and returning him to the scene of the shooting. The officers allegedly told Jimenez not to ruin their vehicle as he was bleeding and vomiting from a bullet fragment lodged near his lung. A DHS statement claimed Jimenez had attempted to run iCE officers over and he was charged with assault, charges that were dropped after he moved to compel discovery of the government's communications regarding the case and in response the government agreed to allow him to enter a diversion program. Jimenez later sued the federal government for $25 million claiming the government fabricated the charges and related evidence.

=== Christian Jimenez and Isaias Eduardo Soto Elias ===
ICE detained U.S. citizen Christian Jimenez, a 17-year-old high school senior, in McMinnville, Oregon on November 22, 2025. Jimenez was driving his father's car when ICE agents stopped him, broke the car window, and arrested him, despite his professions of U.S. citizenship. He was released later that day. His older brother, Cesar Jimenez, stated that authorities may be charging his brother with interference or obstruction of an investigation. According to the DHS, a Chevy Tahoe driven by U.S. citizen Isaias Eduardo Soto Elias was following border patrol agents for several miles when a Ford F-150 driven by Jimenez "showed up on the scene and colluded with the Chevy Tahoe to barricade the agents, preventing their movement and obstructing them." ICE arrested Soto Elias for impeding federal law enforcement officers. Jimenez left the scene and was tracked down by other officers and arrested for impeding federal law enforcement officers.

=== Rodrick Johnson ===
U.S. citizen and military veteran Rodrick Johnson was detained by federal agents during a late night immigration raid on a building in the South Shore neighborhood of Chicago on September 30, 2025. He was dragged from his home, zip-tied and detained by federal agents for nearly three hours before being released. Agents ignored his request for an attorney.

=== Brad Lander ===
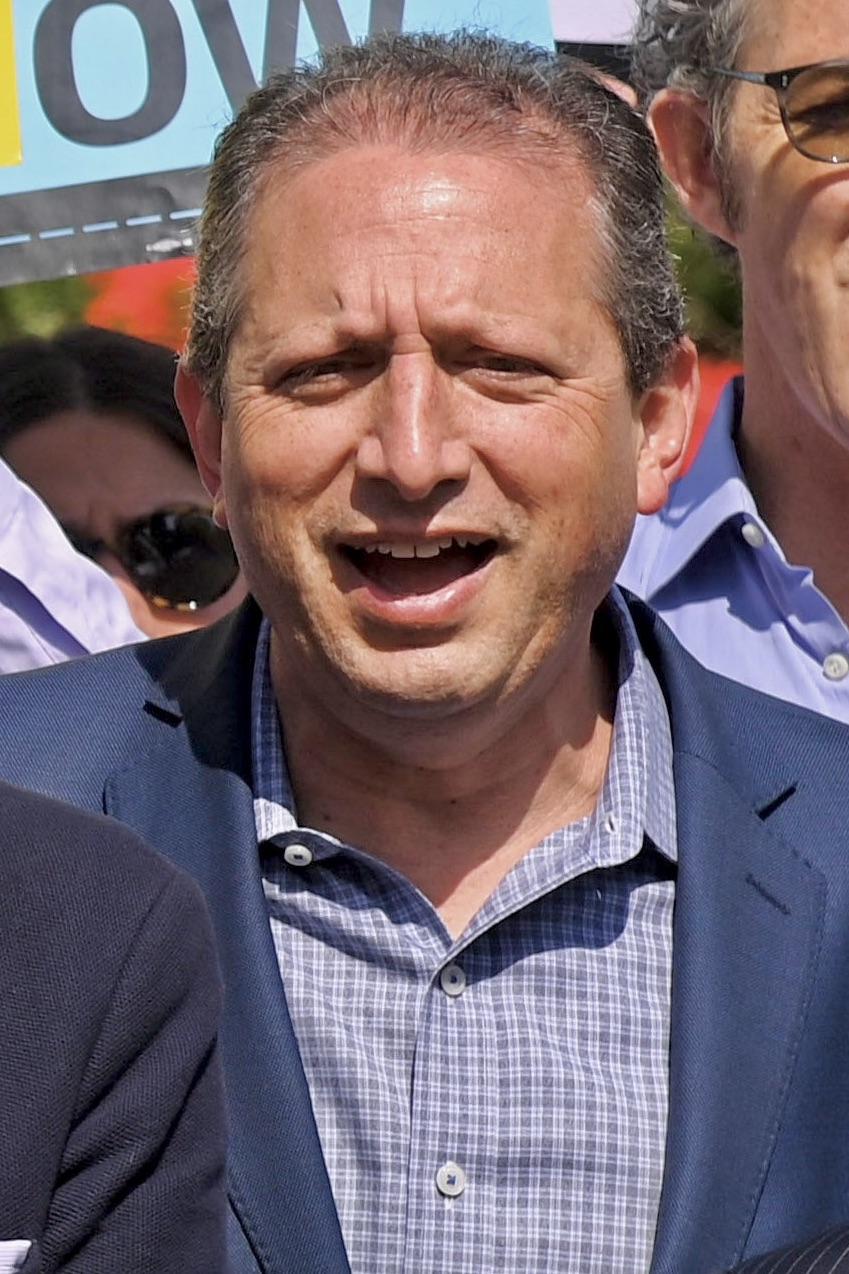
Brad Lander, the New York City Comptroller and a U.S. citizen, was detained by ICE.

New York City Comptroller and former mayoral candidate Brad Lander has been detained by ICE twice. Lander had begun accompanying defendants to immigration hearings. On June 17, 2025, Lander was arrested and handcuffed by masked Immigration and Customs Enforcement (ICE) officials at an immigration court while linking arms with a person ICE was trying to detain. The official reason provided for the arrest was "assaulting law enforcement and impeding a federal officer", according to Department of Homeland Security spokeswoman Tricia McLaughlin, although Lander was later released saying that he "certainly did not" assault an officer. The arrest was quickly condemned by an array of Democratic politicians from the state, including New York State Governor Kathy Hochul, Attorney General Letitia James, and Representative Alexandria Ocasio-Cortez.

On September 18, 2025, Lander was arrested and detained by ICE agents in New York City, along with 14 other elected New York area officials, after being denied access to inspect prisoner holding cells, which courts have ruled unsanitary.

=== Kenny Laynez ===
Kenny Laynez, an 18-year-old U.S.-born citizen, was detained by Florida Highway Patrol and Border Patrol agents on May 2, 2025. The officers dragged Laynez and his coworkers out of their van, pushed Laynez to the pavement, and used a taser on one of his coworkers. His detention was recorded on video. When Laynez stated he was a U.S.-born citizen with the right to talk, a Border Patrol officer replied, "You don't have any rights here. You are a 'Migo', brother." Laynez resisted attempts to get him to surrender his phone and the recording of the arrest, which allowed him to preserve it. Laynez was released six hours later. Officers mentioned a $30,000 bonus, but did not clarify what bonus or why.

=== Marcos Leao ===
On June 13, 2025, 27-year-old Marcos Leao, a U.S. citizen and army veteran, was detained at the Wilshire Federal Building by the United States Marines stationed there under orders from Donald Trump. The detention was confirmed to Reuters by the military. Leao was on his way to a Veterans Affairs office when he crossed a yellow-tape boundary and was stopped by Marines. Leao said he was treated "very fairly" and "They're just doing their job."

=== Elzon Lemus ===
Elzon Lemus, a 23-year-old Hispanic New Yorker, was stopped during his commute to his electrician job and detained in Westbury, New York by ICE officials saying they were looking for someone fitting his description in June 2025. Lemus refused to provide identification to the officials until they identified themselves, which they refused to do. Lemus explained that he did not provide the officials ID because they were not dressed as police, he had not broken any laws, and he was just riding in a passenger seat of a vehicle. Lemus was then handcuffed and detained for 20–25 minutes and released after officials found his ID on his person. Lemus's attorney has accused ICE of violating Lemus's civil rights and arguing that Americans should not have to live under this type of harassment.

=== Juan Carlos Lopez-Gomez ===
Juan Carlos Lopez-Gomez, an American citizen born in the United States and residing in Georgia, was traveling from his home to Florida for a construction job along with two other people on April 16, 2025. Their car was pulled over for a traffic stop by the Florida Highway Patrol for allegedly speeding. Lopez-Gomez, along with the driver and an additional passenger, were arrested and each charged with allegedly entering Florida as an "unauthorized alien" under Florida law SB 4-C.

The government claims that Lopez-Gomez confessed that he was in the country illegally to authorities, but Lopez-Gomez disputes this claim insisting that he told the official he was an American citizen and provided a Social Security card and Georgia ID. Both Lopez-Gomez's mother and his community advocate presented Lopez-Gomez's birth certificate to Leon County Judge LaShawn Riggans, who deemed the birth certificate authentic. The judge said that there was nothing she could do to let him out of jail at that time, despite finding no probable cause to hold Lopez-Gomez. The Florida Phoenix reported that the driver was being held under an ICE order.

Lopez-Gomez was detained in the Leon County Jail until he was released on April 17. Alana Greer of the Community Justice Project—a Florida immigration advocacy group—described the experience as, "A series of horrors", and said that "[n]o one should have been arrested under this law, let alone a U.S. citizen." Lopez-Gomez's attorney stated that this case is "a prime example of why everyone should care, because if it happens to Mr. Lopez-Gomez, a U.S.-born citizen, it can happen to anyone."

=== Jensy Machado ===
Naturalized U.S. citizen Jensy Machado and two other men were stopped and detained by ICE on March 5, 2025, while they were driving to work in Manassas, Virginia. The ICE officers had their guns out and said that they were looking for someone with a different name who had a deportation order and had given Machado's address as his own. Machado explained that he was not the man they were looking for and offered to show them his Real ID driver's license, but was told to keep his hands in the air and was then handcuffed. He was only released after officials viewed his driver's license. Machado said that he had thought ICE was only going to target criminals, but is instead assuming that all Hispanic people are in the country illegally. Machado also stated that he regretted voting for Trump.

That month, Virginia senator Mark Warner wrote to DHS, "U.S. citizens interacting with ICE who seek to prove their identity with identification or other documents that would assist ICE in determining their identity and immigration status should be permitted to do so." He also asked the agency to answer several questions, such as whether the ICE officers identified themselves prior to pulling out their guns, and whether they had been "counseled or disciplined" for their actions.

=== Adrian Andrew Martinez ===
Adrian Andrew Martinez is an American citizen born in Los Angeles, who was detained outside of his job at a Wal-Mart by ICE in June 2025. Video footage showed "agents in tactical gear restraining Martinez as they wrestle him to the ground." Martinez was held incommunicado after the unidentified individuals abducted him, with officials denying any knowledge of Martinez's whereabouts. After a hearing on June 21, Martinez was released on a $5,000 bond and charged with alleged conspiracy to impede or injure an officer. His lawyers called this "a clearly trumped up charge filed to justify the federal agents' violent treatment of Adrian" and said that "Adrian did nothing wrong, and was standing up for an elderly janitorial worker when he was violently assaulted and abducted."

=== Jose "Joey" Martinez ===
On January 5, 2026, Jose "Joey" Martinez and his wife, of Phoenix, Arizona, were sleeping in their room on a Carnival Cruise Line ship docked in Miami when Border Patrol agents entered their room and detained Martinez, taking him to a holding cell. Martinez is a naturalized citizen who was born to a member of the Air Force in Thailand. Martinez's wife, a naturalized citizen from Belgium, attempted to film his detention, but agents took her phone and forced Martinez to delete it. Martinez said agents told him he was flagged for having the same name as someone wanted for a crime.

=== Marimar Martinez ===
Marimar Martinez, a 30-year-old U.S. citizen of Chicago, was shot five times by U.S. Customs and Border Protection agents in the Brighton Park neighborhood of Chicago on October 4, 2025. Federal agents claimed that she was armed, had pointed her weapon at them and had attempted to box in their vehicle. According to her lawyer, bodycam footage conflicted with their statement, showing an agent saying "Do something, bitch", before agents ran into her vehicle and one fired at her. The lawyer said she had a gun in her purse in the passenger seat, never in her hand, and a concealed carry license in the state. She was not charged with a firearms charge.

Martinez was taken to a local hospital in fair condition and discharged later that day before being charged with allegedly assaulting a federal officer. Protests broke out in the area of the shooting, and federal agents shot pepper balls and tear gas at the protesters. During the proceedings, it came out that Charles Exum, the agent who shot her, had bragged to other agents about leaving seven bullet holes in Martinez with five bullets. After the Department of Homeland Security had called her a terrorist multiple times, federal prosecutors moved to drop their own case, and the judge dismissed her charges with prejudice.

=== Bajun Mavalwalla ===
A month after a June 2025 protest against ICE in Spokane, WA, FBI agents arrested US Army veteran Bajun Mavalwalla II on conspiracy charges. The acting US attorney resigned rather than signing the indictment against him. Mavalwalla's father, also a military veteran, decided to run for Congress after his son's arrest.

=== Sabrina Medina ===
U.S. citizen Sabrina Medina's home in Huntington Park, California was raided in June 2025 by ICE agents. Secretary of Homeland Security Kristi Noem was present at the raid on Medina's home. ICE claimed to be in pursuit of Medina's husband, who is not a U.S. citizen. At the time, Medina's husband was not present at the home. Medina's young daughter, also a U.S. citizen, fled from ICE and escaped detention.

On August 6, 2025, ICE agents detained Medina, who was pregnant, for the second time and arrested her on a municipal level shoplifting allegation from 2013 as she left a medical clinic for a pregnancy check-up. The agents told Medina she would be released only if she turned in and surrendered her husband. Medina has no contact with her husband, and stated that the agents were using her as bait for him. The agents threatened to arrest other members of Medina's family unless she helped them detain her husband. ICE previously pursued and engaged Medina a total of four times until arresting her for the shoplifting warrant.

=== Ramon Menera ===
ICE agents detained Menera, an American citizen originally from Mexico, outside his Minneapolis home, accusing him of not being a citizen due to his accent. Menera was zip-tied by agents before being released.

=== Merlos children ===
Four U.S. citizen children in Oregon were held in detention by ICE for several weeks, beginning in June 2025. Kenia Merlos and her citizen children were detained while visiting Peace Arch State Park in Washington state; her husband was detained days later at their home. Merlos and family had been near the border to take Merlos's mother, lawfully visiting the U.S. and Canada from Honduras on authorized visas, so she could enter Canada to visit another family member during her trip. The children's mother is lawfully permitted to live in the United States through 2029 and was in the U visa application process.

The family was denied access to lawyers by ICE. After two weeks of unconstitutional delays, they were allowed access to legal representation. Attorneys filed for an emergency judicial ruling on July 13, 2025. The U.S.-citizen children were released from custody by ICE after two weeks and given United States passports by the Federal government. United States federal judge Tana Lin ordered the U.S. government to stand down on any actions involving the family until she had time to review the case.

The situation was not known to the public until it was disclosed by U.S. representative Maxine Dexter of Oregon, who became aware of the family's detention after being tipped off by personal contacts. The parents of the children remained in custody.

=== Elaine Miles ===
Elaine Miles, a Native American actress known for her roles in Northern Exposure and other productions, was stopped by four masked ICE agents who were traveling in a vehicle without front license plates while walking to a bus stop in Redmond, Washington on November 26, 2025. The agents questioned her tribal identification card and, when she attempted to call the number on the card to verify her identity, tried to confiscate her phone.

=== Francisco Miranda ===
U.S. citizen Francisco Miranda of Milwaukie, Oregon, was detained by ICE after being targeted outside of his workplace on October 2, 2025. Miranda sent a tort claim to the U.S. Department of Homeland Security and Homeland Security Secretary Kristi Noem through his attorney on October 6.

=== Daniel Montenegro ===
U.S. citizen Daniel Montenegro was detained by ICE in Van Nuys, California in the summer of 2025 while he was filming a raid. Montenegro stated that he was tackled by several agents, injuring his back. Gregory Bovino later tweeted out his name and the names of three others, accusing them of using homemade tire spikes to disable vehicles, a claim that Montenegro denied. He was later released without charges.

=== Brian Morales Garcia ===
U.S. citizen Brian Morales Garzia was deported to Mexico in the spring of 2026. He had been detained in Texas, was not allowed to get his birth certificate, and was held incommunicado for four days. He sued and was allowed back in the U.S. in the fall of 2026 using his birth certificate. Officials in court disputed his citizenship and claimed he had admitted to being born in Mexico.

=== Ruben Morales, Jr. and Jessie Olazaba ===
On October 25, 2025 in Aurora, Illinois, U.S. citizens Ruben Morales, Jr. and Jessi Olazaba were detained by ICE after they began filming them outside of an elementary school. Olazaba was cited for impeding arrest. Morales was released without charges.

=== Jennifer Moriarty ===
On October 31, 2025, ICE caused a vehicle crash in Evanston, Illinois. They detained three citizens, including Jennifer Moriarty, who an ICE agent tackled to the ground after she started filming the confrontation. An ICE agent also punched a man repeatedly in the face and then knelt on his back as a crowd called for them to stop. A DHS secretary later stated the man assaulted and kicked agents and grabbed an agent's genitals and squeezed them. ICE agents also repeatedly pointed their weapons and pepper spray at the crowd, who were unarmed. Moriarty stated that the ICE agents drove her and the other two people who were detained around for several hours, attempting to cause other vehicles to hit theirs and threatening to mace them. She was released in downtown Chicago several hours later without charges. Evanston Mayor Daniel Biss said that the other two detainees were released.

=== Abdikadir Noor ===
The ACLU of Minnesota alleges in a lawsuit that Abdikadir Noor, a naturalized U.S. citizen from Fridley, Minnesota, had the vehicle he was driving stopped and detained by ICE agents who disparaged his national origin.

=== Julio Noriega ===
U.S. citizen and native Chicagoan Julio Noriega, who has a learning disability that affects his comprehension, was out looking for work, handing out his resume at local businesses in Berwyn, Illinois, on January 31, 2025. He stopped for a slice of pizza, and was grabbed from behind by ICE, arrested without probable cause, handcuffed, and driven away in a van with other detainees. ICE took "his phone and wallet, which held his Social Security card and driver's license." The people in the van were driven around for hours and eventually taken to an ICE processing center in Broadview, Illinois, where he was detained for at least 10 hours without being questioned, still handcuffed and without access to food, water, or a bathroom. He was released in the middle of the night after government officials checked his wallet and determined he was actually an American citizen. Mark Fleming, the associate director of litigation at the National Immigrant Justice Center, said that ICE then "just sent him out to the street, even though he had no money and had no idea where he was", nor a way to get home. ICE did not give Noriega any documentation of the arrest and detention, and later denied having any record of it, including body camera or other video.

=== Hasan Piker ===
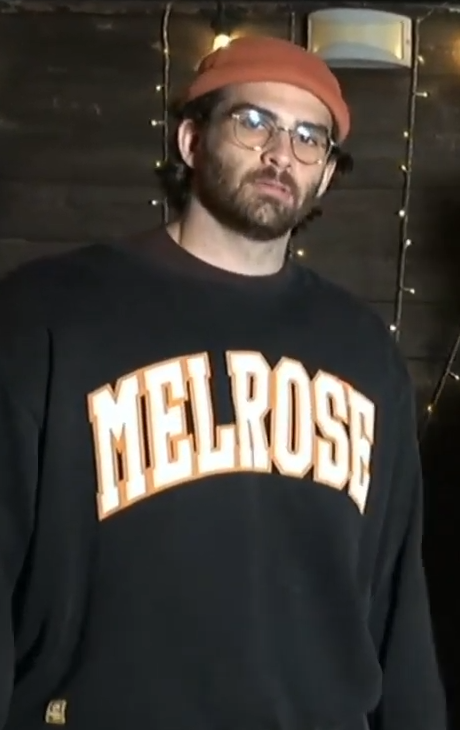
Hasan Piker, a natural-born citizen of the United States, was detained by ICE.

Hasan Piker, a Turkish-American online streamer, YouTuber, influencer, and left-wing political commentator born in New Jersey and a natural-born citizen of the United States, was detained by ICE on May 11, 2025, at O'Hare International Airport. During his detention, Piker was asked a number of questions related to his political views, including about Trump, Israel, Hamas, and Houthis. Piker was asked, "Do you like Donald Trump?" The BBC News compared Piker's detention by Trump immigration officials to the detentions of Mahmoud Khalil and Rümeysa Öztürk, who were detained by Trump officials for their political views.

=== Angel Pina ===
Angel Pina was physically assaulted by ICE agents after they pursued him from a Stater Bros. store in Ontario, California in July 2025. Pina was detained by ICE, and ultimately sent to the hospital with a potential concussion and vomiting fits from this attack.

=== Heidi Plummer ===
On June 14, 2025, Heidi Plummer of Orange County, California, claimed she was arrested by ICE at Centennial Regional Park in Santa Ana. Plummer, an attorney and an U.S. citizen of Ecuadorian ancestry, stated she was detained during a mass apprehension of people of Hispanic background. Plummer's attorney stated, "They're going in and just grabbing Latinos. It's a clear violation of these individuals' constitutional rights." An ICE spokesperson stated, "ICE was not at that park that day, nor did they make any arrests there." Likewise, a Santa Ana Police Department spokesperson stated that although they had personnel at the park that day, they were not aware of any raids.

=== Miguel Angel Ponce Jr. ===
On July 23, 2025, ICE agents demanded U.S. citizen Miguel Angel Ponce Jr. provide identification, and then immediately detained him. ICE agents claimed that Ponce had a "deportation order", despite Ponce having been born in College Station, Texas. Ponce was never provided a warrant and was instead shown a photograph of another man. ICE falsely claimed he was the other man, who was a violent child sex offender. After being released, Ponce was warned to alter his appearance by ICE, who told him, "Shave your beard off so we won't mistake you again."

=== Rob Potylo ===
Rob Potylo, aka "Robby Roadsteamer", a U.S. citizen and comedian from Massachusetts known for his anti-Trump song parodies, was arrested by ICE outside of an ICE facility in Portland, Oregon on October 15, 2025. He had been singing his parody songs in a giraffe outfit when ICE accused him of crossing a blue line in front of the facility that was off limits to protesters. Video footage contradicted ICE's statement, showing that Potylo was nowhere near the blue line. Potylo was detained for about an hour and released with a citation for failure to obey an officer of the law. He stated that he planned to file a lawsuit against ICE for wrongful arrest.

Potylo was arrested a second time at a protest outside the ICE building in Fort Snelling, Minnesota on January 12, 2026. He was again wearing the giraffe outfit when agents arrested him. After his release, Potylo again stated he would file a lawsuit against ICE.

=== Aliya Rahman ===
U.S. citizen Aliya Rahman is dragged from her car and arrested on January 13, 2026. (Note: At 12:07 in this video, Rahman can be seen blocking traffic with five agents urging her to move. At 13:01, she partially turns and stops in the intersection. Again, agents urge her to move. At 13:05 she moves ahead a few feet and stops again. Agents urge her to move. At 13:50, an agent smashes her right window and urges her to leave. At 14:02, agents order Rahman out of the car. At 14:07, agents open Rahman's door and attempt to drag her out. Rahman struggles with agents until she is handcuffed at 15:00. At 15:08 she falls and agents carry her off by her shoulders and legs. At 15:45 Rahman states she is autistic and has a brain injury. At 16:43, still struggling, Rahman is loaded into an unmarked vehicle.)

U.S. citizen Rahman was driving to a doctor's appointment in Minneapolis when she encountered ICE agents at an intersection. One agent smashed her car window before others dragged her out of the vehicle. Rahman said she was denied medical treatment and lost consciousness while in custody. A DHS spokesperson stated that Rahman "ignored multiple commands by an officer to move her vehicle away from the scene."

She was later invited to the 2026 State of the Union Address and was arrested for standing up and ignoring Capitol Police commands to sit down. In June 2026, she filed a compliant with the DHS Office for Civil Rights and Civil Liberties, the complaint did not receive a response. In November 2026, she filed a lawsuit against the federal government, alleging assault and false imprisonment.

=== Javier Ramirez ===
Javier Ramirez, a U.S. citizen born in San Bernardino, California, was detained by ICE on June 13, 2025, during an ICE raid at his workplace in Montebello. Ramirez was tackled and detained after informing his coworkers that ICE had arrived, and targeted by the agents in response. The U.S. Attorney's Office stated that Ramirez is expected to be charged with allegedly assaulting a federal officer.

=== Jose Roberto Ramirez ===
On the afternoon of January 8, 2026, ICE agents took U.S. citizen Jose Roberto Ramirez into custody in Robbinsdale, Minnesota. According to family members ICE agents assaulted him after asking for his identification, then handcuffed him and took him away. He was released later that afternoon. Ramirez was born in Minneapolis; his father is from Mexico and his mother is a member of the Red Lake Nation.

=== Kristina Ramirez ===
Chicago resident and U.S. citizen, Kristina Ramirez, was detained on May 28, 2025 by U.S. Customs and Border Protection, along with her husband, who has a pending U.S. visa application. While on a business trip in Michigan, Ramirez and her husband Sergio Serna Ramirez mistakenly approached the Canadian border after a wrong turn in their car. Kristina claims she was held for three days. A CBP spokesperson countered, "CBP has no indication Mrs. Ramirez was held for three days." Her husband was transferred to an ICE facility. According to Mr. Ramirez, he was detained for three months before he decided to self-deport to Mexico at the advice of his lawyer.

=== Tatyana Reisini and Kristen Roos ===
On November 15, 2025, Reisini and Roos were in a car in east Charlotte, North Carolina when they noticed ICE agents in the neighborhood and honked their car horn. DHS claimed Reisini was "swerving and attempting to make contact with federal vehicles." When DHS attempted a traffic stop, Reisini fled, ignoring stop signs and running a red light. Federal agents pursued them to a residential area, where the agents broke the car windows and arrested both of them. The women were charged with assaulting federal agents, but the charges were dropped.

=== George Retes ===
George Retes, a disabled United States military veteran and U.S. citizen, was detained by ICE agents during a raid on a farm in California on July 10, 2025. Retes identified himself as a United States citizen and employee of the farm that was raided by ICE agents. Retes was then pepper sprayed, tear gassed, his car window smashed, and he was removed from his vehicle at gunpoint by ICE agents. ICE agents physically tackled Retes despite his American citizenship.

During his detention, Retes was denied any phone call to notify anyone of his whereabouts, and was denied legal representation. While in ICE custody, Retes was denied medical treatment and forced to be covered in chemical weapons residue. Retes remained missing and his whereabouts unknown through July 12, 2025. He was released without charges on Sunday, July 13. The office of U.S. House member Pramila Jayapal confirmed that Retes was held without access to legal representation and without charges for three days.

=== Maria Guadalupe Rodriguez and Jose Ricardo Munoz ===
On March 15, 2025, Maria Rodriguez and her son Jose Munoz were pulled over by police in Centerton, Arkansas for minor traffic violations. An officer arrested the two and took them to the Centerton Police Department based on statements made by ICE agents saying Rodriguez was in the country illegally. A lawsuit said the arrest warrant was for a different Maria Rodriguez. The lawsuit also accused police of having Rodriguez's truck towed, despite Rodriguez's daughter arriving to pick it up.

=== Ricardo Antonio Roman-Flores and Emilio Roman-Flores ===
The Roman-Flores twins, both U.S. citizens, were arrested December 9, 2025 after allegedly threatening to kill a Department of Homeland Security assistant secretary and calling for violence against immigration agents. The twins called to "shoot ICE on sight" on social media. They were arrested during a joint operation between DHS and the Absecon Police Department SWAT team. Emilio's charges include unlawful possession of an assault weapon, possession of prohibited weapons, conspiracy to make terroristic threats, criminal coercion, threats and cyber harassment. Ricardo is charged with alleged conspiracy to make terroristic threats. Both were taken to Absecon Police Department.

=== Adrian Ruiz and Edgar Ruiz ===
In September 2025, ICE detained Edgar and Adrian Ruiz, both U.S. citizens, while blocking their truck outside a local 7-Eleven store in Des Plaines, Illinois. ICE was attempting to capture Ruiz's father, an undocumented immigrant. During the incident, then-unidentified masked and armed men swarmed their vehicle, and Ruiz held the door closed in self-defense. Both brothers ran. Federal agents then tasered Ruiz "in the face" and detained him as nearby people "ran for their lives". The father did not run and was taken into custody.

=== Isaias Pena Salcedo ===
In the city of Bell, California, United States citizen, Isaias Pena Salcedo was detained as he walked near a crowd of people protesting an immigration raid in June 2025. No reason was given for his arrest and detention and Pena Salcedo states that he gave the officers his passport but they paid no attention or did not care as officers in masks arrested him and took him away in an unmarked car. It took his family and friends over 8 hours to locate him and he spent 70 hours in detention, including two vehicle transfers and three days in the Metropolitan Detention Center in Los Angeles.

Pena Salcedo reported that he and relatives were walking to get supplies for a birthday party when they came upon the crowd in front of Jack's Carwash and Detailing. As they walked, an unmarked immigration vehicle came through the parking lot close to Pena Salcedo. In videos on social media, Pena Salcedo can be seen in front of the vehicle as it approaches wherein he closes his fist and quickly taps it on the hood of the car in the crowd of people. He can be seen in the video immediately surrounded and taken away by masked officers with guns.

During his 70 hours in detention, Pena Salcedo reports that conditions were very poor. There were three people in his cell but only one mattress while the other two beds were bare metal bunks. He also said there was little food and he could not receive funds from his family for any supplies like a toothbrush. Pena Salcedo was also denied a call to his family. Immediately following his release, he still had not received word if he would be charged with any crime.

=== Rafie Shouhed ===
Rafie Shouhed, a U.S. citizen and car wash owner in Van Nuys, California, was detained by ICE agents on September 17, 2025. KNBC reported video showed Shouhed knocked to the ground by ICE agents in his business. After, when he went to speak with the agents, he was knocked down again, handcuffed, detained, and taken with his staff to a Federal facility. Shouhed was later released. A DHS sprokesperson stated that the raid resulted in the arrest of five illegal aliens from Guatemala and Mexico including one who was removed from the country twice in 2015. Shouhed has filed a $50 million claim against DHS.

=== Barbara Stone ===
Barbara Stone, a 71-year-old ICE observer in San Diego and U.S. citizen, was handcuffed, injured, and detained by ICE agents for eight hours on July 8, 2025. In recorded videos, a group of masked men pursued her, detained her, and took Stone's possessions, claiming she assaulted an officer. ICE agents refused to return her cellular phone; Stone reported ICE compared it to keeping a drug dealer's phone.

=== ChongLy "Scott" Thao ===
Thao, a Hmong-American naturalized citizen originally from Laos, was detained by ICE agents during a raid on his home. Thao was singing karaoke when federal agents arrived and detained him. The DHS said they were targeting two convicted sex offenders but the Thao family only knew one of them, the ex-husband of a family member, and he no longer resided at the home. DHS said Thao was detained because he refused to be fingerprinted or facially identified. Thao was in his underwear and was covered by his grandson's blanket and was led out of his home in his underwear during his arrest. On April 13, 2026, Ramsey County Attorney John Choi announced his office was looking into the incident for possible kidnapping charges.

=== Susan Tincher ===
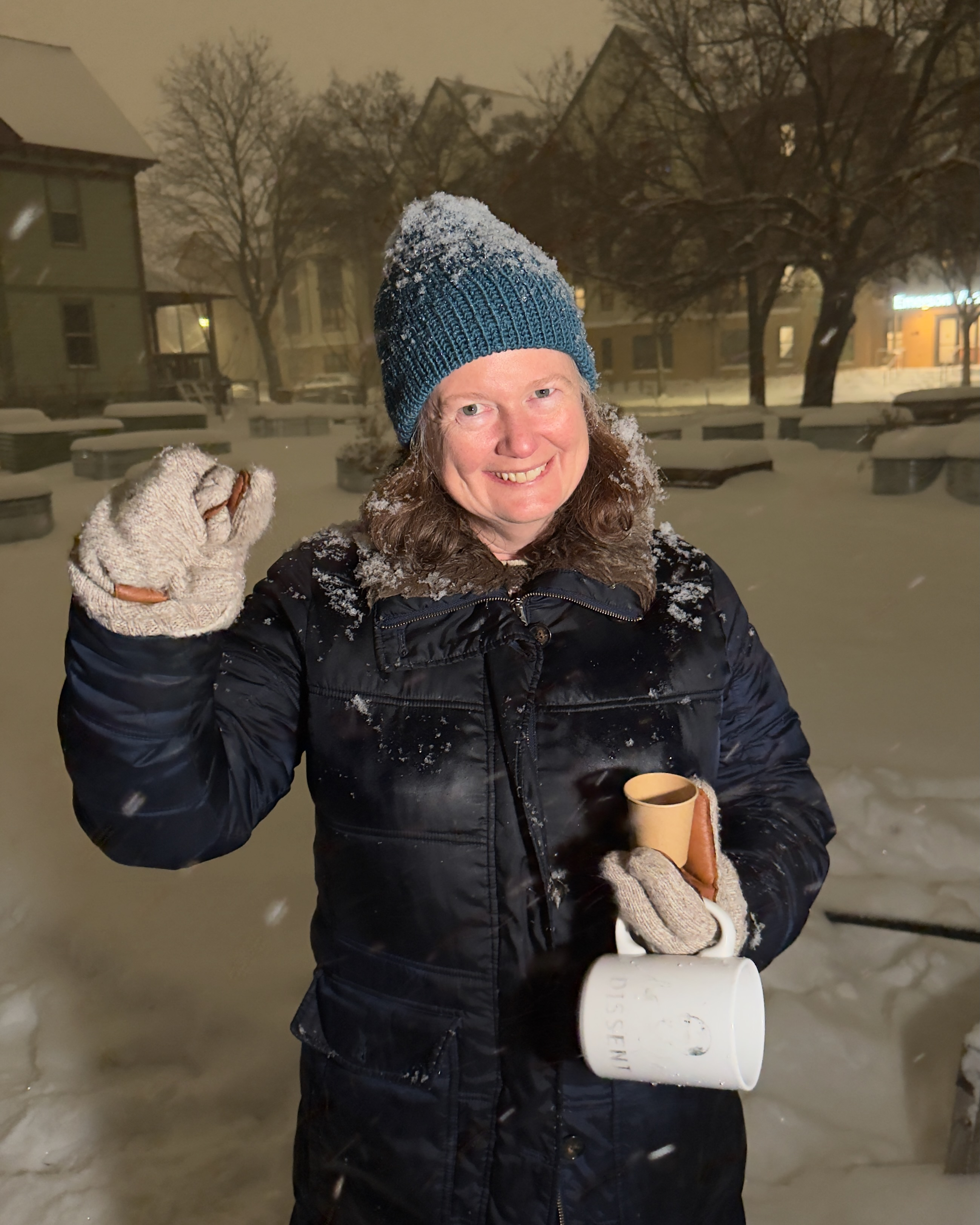
Susan Tincher at her welcome home party after being released from ICE detention on December 9, 2025

55-year-old Susan Tincher was arrested shortly after 6:30 a.m. in the Willard-Hay neighborhood of Minneapolis on December 9, 2025. Tincher was confronting agents who arrested three of her neighbors when agents surrounded and arrested her, placing her in a van. She was held in the Whipple Federal Building in Fort Snelling, Minnesota for five hours before being released. ICE stated Tincher was arrested after she assaulted a federal agent, tried to pass through a security perimeter, ignored commands, and became violent. Tincher said she will be charged with alleged obstruction.

=== Lizbeth Vargas Andrade ===
As she was recording the detention of a man being released from a county jail in Modesto, California, ICE agents physically detained US citizen Lizbeth Vargas Andrade, pepper sprayed her, forced her face down onto the ground and handcuffed her. Video taken at the scene showed her and an ICE agent bumping into each other. Vargas Andrade, who was 12 weeks pregnant, was taken to local ICE headquarters and released without charge, after which an ambulance took her to a local hospital. DHS and DOJ spokespeople declined to comment on the incident.

=== Fernando Vazquez ===
Fernando Vazquez, an 18-year-old U.S. citizen, was detained by Border Patrol in November 2025 while he was at work in Cary, North Carolina. The agents detained him in their van, took him roughly two miles (3.2 km) down the street, and then released him after realizing that he was a citizen. The agents also threw his wallet and other personal items on the ground, causing Vazquez to lose several personal items. Vazquez believes that he was targeted because he is Latino. Another Hispanic man, who was not released, asked Vazquez to contact his brother for him, which Vazquez said "broke [his] heart".

=== Andrea Vélez ===
U.S. citizen Andrea Vélez was arrested by ICE agents in Los Angeles on June 24, 2025. Vélez was detained moments after leaving a car to be dropped off at work in downtown, and forced into unmarked vehicles by masked men, who spoke to her in Spanish. Family members of Vélez were unable to locate or discover her whereabouts for days. Vélez was detained for a total of two days after being detained by ICE agents. ICE agents did not question Vélez about any citizenship status until after she was already physically detained and "carried away". For 24 hours of her detention, Vélez was denied access to drinking water. Vélez was charged with allegedly assaulting a federal officer and released on bail. Her case was dismissed by the U.S. Department of Justice.

=== Leonardo Garcia Venegas ===
American-born citizen Leonardo Garcia Venegas was detained thrice. The first time was in a vehicle following an immigration raid in Foley, Alabama, in May 2025. He was subsequently released after giving authorities his Social Security number. Garcia's brother, who is not a U.S. citizen, was arrested during the raid. According to Garcia and his cousin, the authorities conducting the raid saw Garcia's REAL ID and called it fake before detaining him. The Cato Institute identified the dismissal of Garcia's REAL ID as fake as racial profiling. He was detained again weeks later, and his REAL ID was again dismissed.

On September 30 the Institute for Justice filed a class action lawsuit naming defendants including the U.S. and the unnamed agents who arrested and detained Garcia. The lawsuit asked for damages for assault, battery and false arrest for Garcia; a declaration that the ICE policies leading up to them were unconstitutional, arbitrary and capricious; and an injunction against applying them against Garcia and anyone in a similar situation.

The third time was on May 2, 2026, when agents dismissed his claims of citizenship and his REAL ID yet again. DHS said to ProPublica that Garcia was "NOT detained"; ProPublica noted that Garcia was shackled.

=== William Vermie ===
On January 13, 2026, Iraq War veteran William Vermie was detained by ICE agents while observing an arrest. Vermie said that while in custody, he repeatedly asked to make a phone call but was not allowed one. His attorney said he was not allowed to see Vermie because Vermie had not requested him by name.

=== Jeane "Blue" Wong ===
San Diego resident and U.S. citizen Jeane "Blue" Wong was detained by ICE on July 2, 2025. Wong was detained during a protest targeting ICE immigration raids in Linda Vista. In an Instagram video, Wong pushes into caution tape in front of ICE agents when one physically shoves her before detaining her. Wong did not disclose her first name to Times of San Diego "to level the playing field". Wong was transported to a holding facility and placed in what she described as solitary confinement. Wong later pled guilty to a federal misdemeanor assault charge for pulling down an HSI agent’s face covering. She was sentenced to 45 days of home detention. While on pre-trial release for this incident, Wong was arrested with five others at a sit-in protest at San Diego Mayor Todd Gloria’s office.

=== Erik Zepeda ===
On October 21, 2026, ICE agents detained US citizen Erik Zepeda, a 20-year-old high school student with disabilities, in Santa Maria, California. Though an ICE statement denied that agents injured him, hospital records show he underwent surgery for a broken wrist. An observer reported ICE detained Zepeda as he was walking past agents who had previously stopped two cars driven by Latinos. ICE claimed Zepeda matched the description of a "criminal illegal alien subject," resisted agents and "assumed a fighting stance" though the observer did not see any resistance. US Representative Salud O. Carbajal called for a full investigation into the incident; the Santa Barbara County Attorney's office was also investigating.

== Unidentified citizens ==
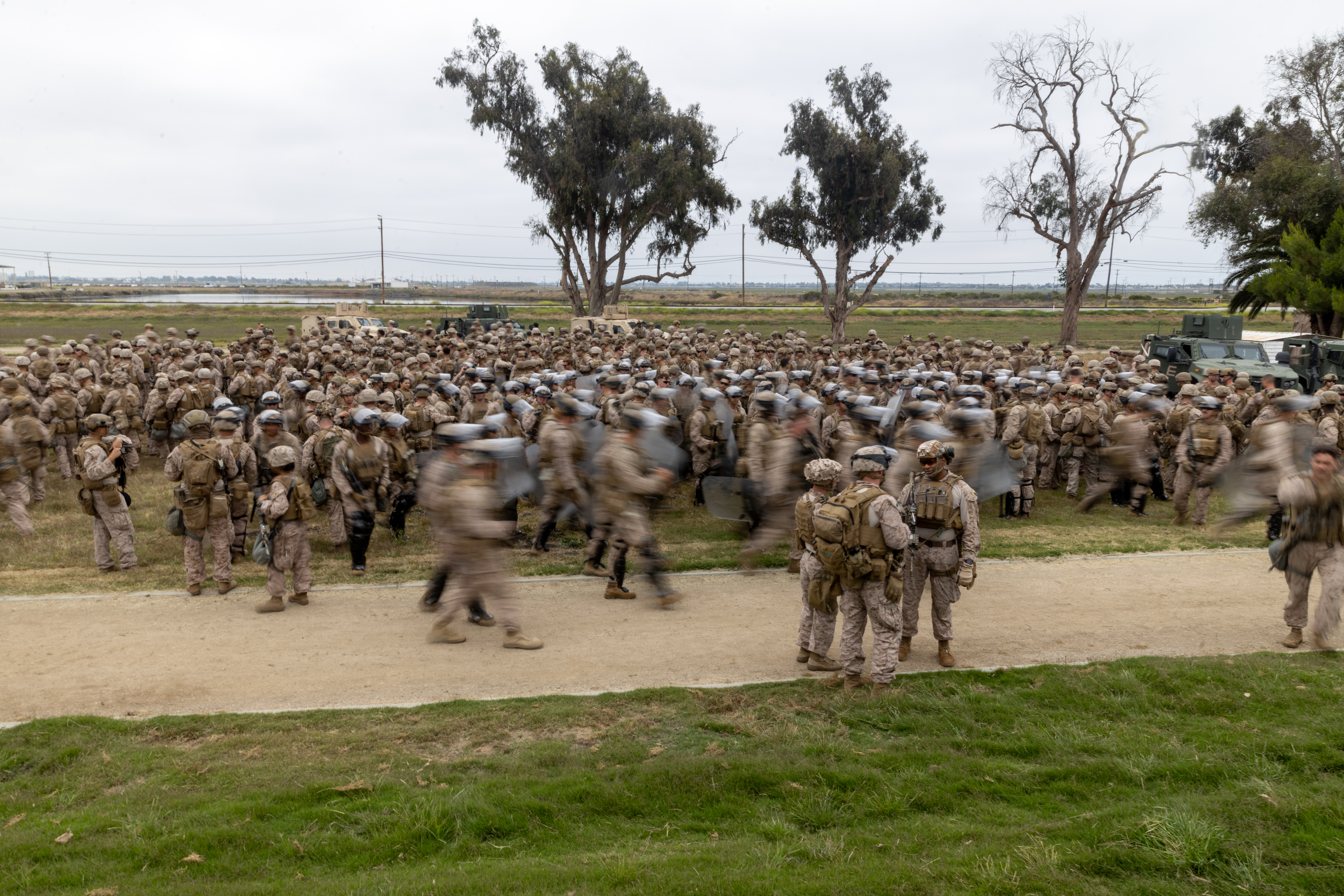
U.S. Marines arrive in Los Angeles, 2025. The Marines were under order of the Trump administration to protect federal buildings. They later detained a U.S. citizen.

A number of detained U.S. citizens are unidentified or unknown by name.

=== Arizona citizens ===
A U.S. Marshal was detained by ICE in Arizona in the summer of 2025 after officers mistakenly thought he was another person.

=== California citizens ===
==== Disabled teen ====
On August 11, 2025, Border Patrol in Arleta, Los Angeles detained at gunpoint a disabled 15-year-old who was a United States citizen. The detained teen was described as having "significant disabilities" by Alberto M. Carvalho, superintendent of the Los Angeles Unified School District.

DHS officials claimed the U.S.-born disabled teen was from El Salvador, a "MS-13 gang member with a previous gun-related conviction", an adult, and that the family asked Border Patrol to detain the teen. LAUSD activated a "safe passage for students" plan to enhance all school bus services to cover any child. The school district has requested federal agents to honor a few block radius no-enforcement zone around each school.

==== Los Angeles citizens (38) ====
On July 23, 2025, the Los Angeles Times reported that as of that date at least 38 citizens in the city had been detained and arrested by ICE, with Trump administration officials attempting to secure grand jury indictments against them for various alleged offenses.

==== Camarillo citizens (4) ====
At least 4 U.S. citizens were detained by ICE in a raid on a cannabis farm on July 10, 2025. DHS stated that those arrested were "resisting or assaulting officers", but it is unclear how many of those arrested were protesting the raid and how many were employed at the farm.

=== Illinois citizens ===
In September 2025, a U.S. citizen of Chicago and his father, who is not a citizen, were both detained for several hours at the ICE facility in Broadview, Illinois. The U.S. citizen was released, but the father remains in ICE detention out of state.

Four children who are U.S. citizens were detained by federal agents during a late night immigration raid on a building in the South Shore neighborhood of Chicago on September 30, 2025. They were dragged from their homes, zip-tied and detained by federal agents "until they could be placed in the care of guardians". Reports on the raid stated that some children were taken from the building while naked.

A 21-year-old U.S. citizen was detained by U.S. Border Patrol in a vehicle in Chicago on October 4, 2025 after they rammed into his car, following an incident where federal agents shot a woman.

A U.S. citizen with the first name "Angel" was grabbed off the street and pulled into a vehicle by U.S. Border Patrol agents in the South Chicago neighborhood of Chicago on October 15, 2025. The incident was captured on his cousin's ring camera. After interrogating him, agents dropped him off half a mile away from where they had pulled him into the vehicle.

On October 25, 2025, ICE deployed tear gas in the Chicago neighborhoods of Old Irving Park and Avondale, in violation of a court order handed down on October 9. Three people were arrested, including two U.S. citizens, and an agent violently pushed a woman to the ground. A DHS secretary stated that the "two U.S. citizens were arrested for assaulting and impeding a federal officer." A children's Halloween parade was disrupted as a result.

On October 31, 2025, ICE detained at least three U.S. citizens in the Albany Park neighborhood of Chicago. One citizen was accused of assaulting a federal agent.

On September 20, 2026, individuals identifying themselves as federal agents conducting a fugitive investigation, detained a U.S. citizen in Evanston, Illinois after the suspected fugitive initially refused to provide identification. The agents left the scene some time after protesters arrived. The man, who was not the person the agents were seeking, was taken to a hospital with injuries to his head, neck, and teeth.

=== Key Largo behavioral therapist ===
A video on December 3, 2025, showed DHS agents detaining a woman in medical scrubs in Key Largo, Florida as she screamed that she was a U.S. citizen. The DHS claimed the woman had refused commands to roll down her window during a traffic stop, leading agents to drag her out of her vehicle. Agents released her after verifying her identity. The Miami Herald interviewed the woman, a behavioral therapist who was driving to work. The woman denied the DHS's claim that she did not roll her window down, citing video of the incident. The woman was driving her boyfriend's car. A law enforcement source stated he is in the country illegally.

=== Lafayette, Louisiana woman ===
On May 20, 2026, a Colorado-born Lafayette, Louisiana woman was detained by sheriff's deputies and ICE agents at a checkpoint set up at her apartment complex entrance. She presented deputies with her ID and social security card, but deputies claimed they were fake. ICE agents took her to a USCIS office in Lafayette, then to a processing center in Basile. After her attorney provided documents by email, she was released and driven back to Lafayette, though ICE took her social security card and told her she was not allowed to leave the state.

=== Massachusetts citizens ===
On September 26, 2025, ICE agents detained two U.S. citizen children of legal resident Hilda Ramirez Sanan as she accompanied her brother-in-law to a court hearing in Chelsea, Massachusetts. The agents broke out the drivers' side windows of the car Ramirez Sanan was driving, handcuffed her, tried to pull her 13-year-old son who is on the autism spectrum from the car and repeatedly questioned him as to his legal status. After local police asked ICE to check their identification, they were released.

=== Minnesota citizens ===
A Minnesota-born Somali American woman was arrested by ICE near the Nicollet Mall in Minneapolis on December 3, 2025, according to her family. The woman's cousin said ICE agents touched her inappropriately and mocked her hijab. She was let go after her husband showed authorities her passport card.

On December 13, 2025, ICE agents stopped the U.S.-citizen son of Congresswoman Ilhan Omar as he was driving away from a local Target store. Earlier, Omar's son had been praying in a local mosque when ICE agents entered. They left without incident. He was released after showing the U.S. passport Omar said he "always carries".

The Minnesota Council on American-Islamic Relations reported it had received many calls from U.S. citizens who ICE had arrested or detained during its operations directed against Somalis and others in Minneapolis.

On January 7, 2026, two employees of a Target store in Richfield were detained at the store's entrance. Both employees are U.S. citizens.

Four members of the Oglala Sioux Tribe were detained by ICE in Minneapolis on January 8, 2026. The four men, all homeless, were detained under a bridge. One of the men was released after a 12-hour hold. As of January 14, 2026, the remaining three were located at the ICE detention center at Fort Snelling, the same place where the U.S. government imprisoned hundreds of Indigenous Americans during and after the Dakota War of 1862. Nick Estes, a professor of American Indian Studies at the University of Minnesota and member of the Lower Brule Sioux Tribe, called the Oglala tribal members' detention at Fort Snelling "a continuation on the monopoly of violence" and stated that the location has an "anti-Indigenous, specifically anti-Dakota, history."

=== New Jersey citizens ===
Trump ICE officials raided Ocean Seafood Depot in Newark, New Jersey on January 23, 2025, and arrested several U.S. citizens, including military veterans, for claimed immigration violations. The owner of Ocean Seafood Depot confirmed the American citizens, including the military veteran, were arrested by ICE for not being able to immediately prove they were U.S. citizens with any form of papers.

=== New York ===
A boy identified by his initials RGM was born in Mexico to a mother in 2017 with American citizenship. His mother moved to the United States and left him with relatives in Mexico. In November 2025, relatives dropped him off at the US border, where he was taken to an Office of Refugee Resettlement (ORR) shelter in Brooklyn. RGM’s child advocate, appointed by ORR, determined that RGM may be a citizen. The advocate asked RGM’s grandmother to provide proof of her daughter’s citizenship and residency, which she did. Make the Road filed a lawsuit demanding RGM’s release. An immigration judge dismissed RGM’s immigration case on the basis that he was a US citizen leading to the release of RGM to the custody of his grandmother.

=== Rhode Island courthouse intern ===
In November 2025, a high school student and U.S. citizen employed as an intern at the Rhode Island Superior Court was detained outside the courthouse in Providence. The intern notified security that someone was taking photos of him; when questioned, the man identified himself as an ICE agent. As an associate judge prepared to drive the intern to his high school, agents surrounded the car and detained the intern. He was released after agents verified his identity.

=== Wisconsin Puerto Rican family (3) ===
In January 2026, family of U.S. citizens from Puerto Rico were detained in a Milwaukee, Wisconsin department store after ICE agents overheard them speaking Spanish. The family members—a toddler, the child's mother, and the child's grandmother—were all born in Puerto Rico. All people born in Puerto Rico, like those born elsewhere in the United States, are automatically American citizens and lawfully allowed to freely travel anywhere within the country with immunity to immigration controls. The family was denied access to legal representation during their detention. ICE later released the family and apologized for their detention and removal attempt, but left them stranded at the detention center.

== Responses by U.S. officials ==
=== Democratic Party ===
In response to early reports of American citizens being detained, two Democrats on the House Judiciary Committee, Jamie Raskin (the ranking member on the committee) and Pramila Jayapal (the ranking member on the immigration subcommittee), wrote Kristi Noem, the DHS secretary, and Caleb Vitello, the acting director of ICE enforcement, asking them to provide information about citizen detention. The February letter noted that ICE does not have authority to detain citizens, and stressed the importance of keeping "the escalating government assault on immigrants from becoming a steamroller that crushes the rights of American citizens."

Democratic Party U.S. House member Pramila Jayapal on July 16, 2025, introduced to Congress the "Stop ICE from Kidnapping U.S. Citizens Act", which would bar ICE from detaining or deporting U.S. citizens. The bill would also apply penalties to ICE for illegal detention of American citizens, but was seen as unlikely to become law under a Republican-controlled House.

Democratic House member Ted Lieu stated it was "batshit crazy" that laws needed to be introduced to prevent ICE from deporting U.S. citizens.

New York governor Kathy Hochul declared her state "will not back down" and called the arrest of American citizens for immigration reasons "bullshit".

=== Republican Party ===
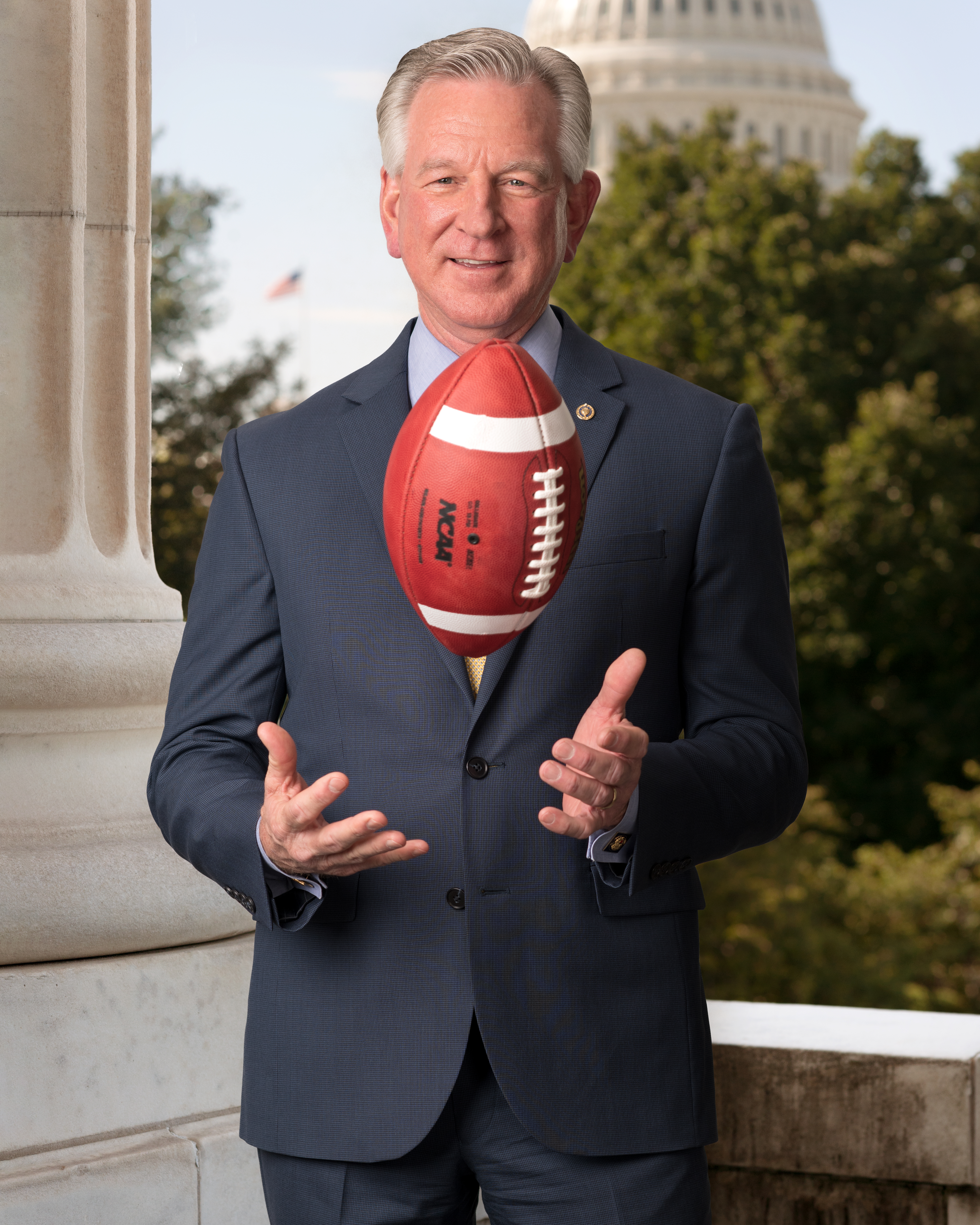
Republican senator Tommy Tuberville claimed U.S. citizens being arrested was a consequence of associating with non-citizens, and mistakes are "gonna happen".

United States conservatives and Republican Party members gave conflicting and contradictory statements on the detentions of American citizens, either endorsing, confirming or denying the practice. Tricia McLaughlin of the Department of Homeland Security claimed reports of U.S. citizens being arrested were false and used to demonize ICE agents. Meanwhile, Trump's border czar Tom Homan confirmed citizens were being detained and arrested by ICE.

In May 2025, Republicans blocked a measure in the One Big Beautiful Bill Act that would have stopped ICE from detaining or deporting U.S. citizens.

==== Troy Nehls ====
Republican House member Troy Nehls accused media and the public of overstating the crisis of citizens being detained by ICE. Nehls stated American citizens should carry documentation to prove citizenship, saying "Well, maybe people can't prove that they're American citizens, either, have the documentation."

==== Ralph Norman ====
Republican House member Ralph Norman stated that he was not concerned with the matter of American citizens being detained by ICE and disputed with journalists that it has happened.

==== Tommy Tuberville ====
Republican senator Tommy Tuberville stated that U.S. citizens detained by ICE were at fault, saying mistakes are going to happen, and that citizens being arrested was a consequence of associating with non-citizens. Tuberville further stated, "Don't hang around illegals."

== Responses by other parties ==
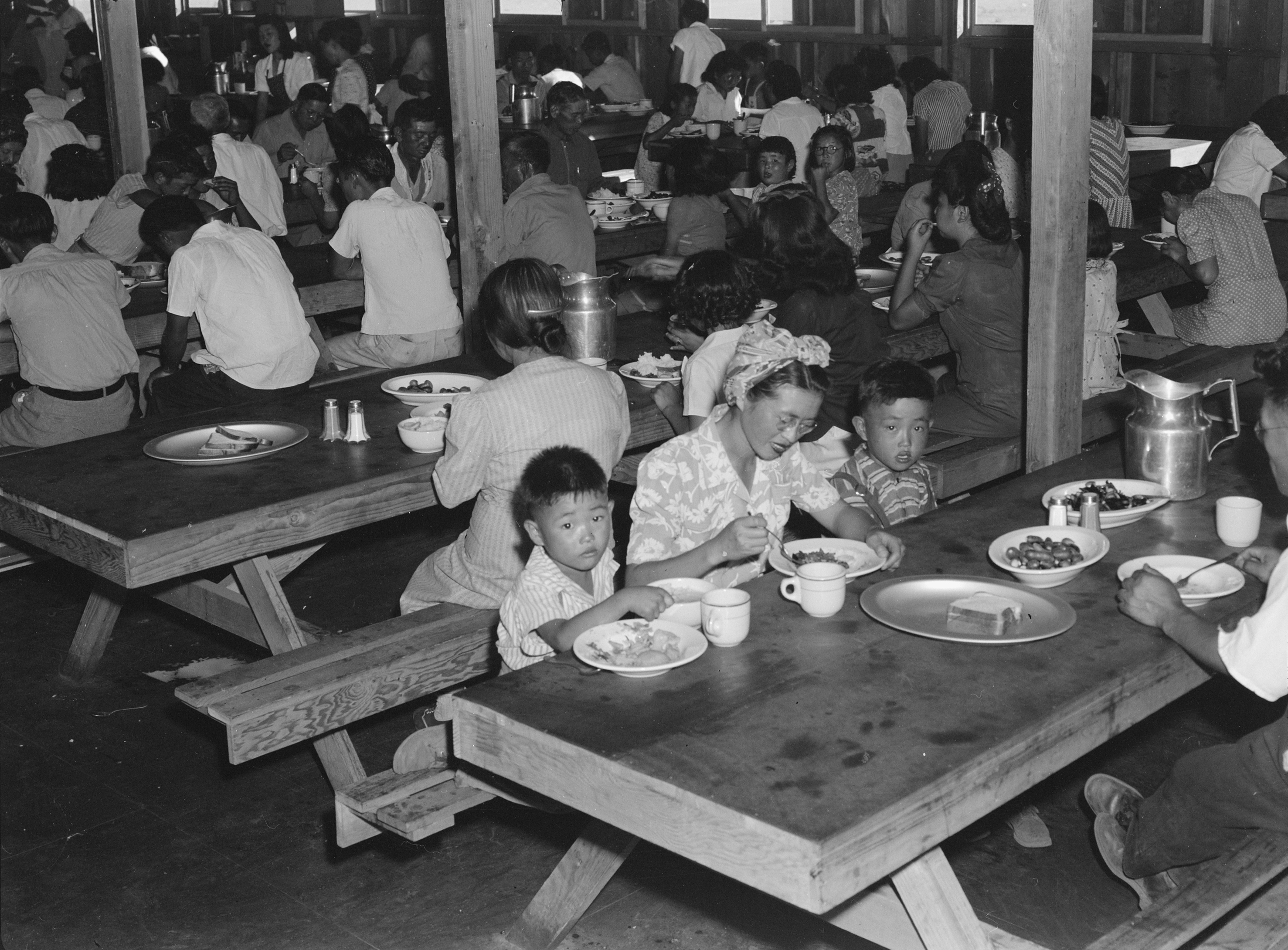
El País compared the second Trump administration's immigration detention policies to the Internment of Japanese Americans during World War II (pictured).

=== American Civil Liberties Union ===
The American Civil Liberties Union (ACLU), among other cases, filed a lawsuit against the Trump administration in Los Angeles over the matter of U.S. citizens being detained and assaulted by ICE agents. Among the court findings that were noted included:

Jason Brian Gavidia is a U.S. citizen who was born and raised in East Los Angeles and identifies as Latino. On the afternoon of June 12, he stepped onto the sidewalk outside of a tow yard in Montebello, California, where he saw agents carrying handguns and military-style rifles. One agent ordered him to "Stop right there" while another "ran towards [him]." The agents repeatedly asked Gavidia whether he is American—and they repeatedly ignored his answer: "I am an American." The agents asked Gavidia what hospital he was born in—and he explained that he did not know which hospital. "The agents forcefully pushed [Gavidia] up against the metal gated fence, put [his] hands behind [his] back, and twisted [his] arm." An agent asked again, "What hospital were you born in?"

=== Cato Institute ===
The libertarian Cato Institute was critical of Trump's immigration regime, calling it illegal profiling, damaging, and harmful to American interests.

== See also ==
- Alligator Alcatraz
- Citizenship of the United States
- Deportation of Americans from the United States
- Due process
- Impersonations of United States immigration officials
- Internment of German Americans
- Internment of Italian Americans
- Internment of Japanese Americans
- June 2025 Los Angeles protests
- Kavanaugh stop
- Killing of Renée Good
- Killing of Alex Pretti
- List of denaturalized former citizens of the United States
- List of shootings by U.S. immigration agents in the second Trump administration
- Operation Midway Blitz
- Operation Wetback
- Protests against mass deportation during the second Trump administration
- Timeline of protests against Donald Trump
- United States person
- Visa and deportation controversies in the second Trump administration
- Your papers, please
