= 2025 Camarillo ICE raid =

Immigration enforcement raid on a farm

- Part of immigration raids and arrests in the second Trump presidency
- Date: July 10, 2025
- Location: Oxnard Plain, Ventura County, California; 34.1801°N 119.0830°W
- Participants: United States Immigration and Customs Enforcement
- Deaths: 1
- Injuries: 12
- Arrests: 361

In 2025, United States Immigration and Customs Enforcement (ICE) and other federal agents raided a cannabis farm in Oxnard Plain. Agents detained at least 319 undocumented migrants, and one farm worker died while trying to escape. At least 12 workers were injured, 8 of whom were hospitalized for their injuries.

Protestors quickly gathered at the farm with DHS stating that four U.S. citizens were arrested for "resisting or assaulting officers." Tear gas was deployed against the protestors. A professor from the nearby university coming to the aid of a protestor and the security guard for the farm were detained. Amidst the chaos, the security guard, a disabled veteran and U.S. citizen, was pepper sprayed and had his car window smashed by an agent.

== Background ==
During Donald Trump's second term as president of the United States, his administration has pursued a deportation policy generally described as "hardline", (Note: Sources that have described Trump's approach to immigration and deportation as "hardline".) "maximalist", and as a "mass deportation" campaign, involving the detention, confinement, and expulsion of hundreds of thousands of immigrants and their family members. The Trump administration has said that around 140,000 people had been deported as of April 2025, though some estimates put the number at roughly half that. On August 28, 2025, CNN reported that U.S. Immigration and Customs Enforcement (ICE) alone had deported nearly 200,000 people in seven months since Trump returned to office. By January 2026, the number of people which ICE alone deported rose to roughly 540,000, which is double the number of people deported under Joe Biden in 2023 and 2024. According to the Migration Policy Institute (MPI), 980,000 people were deported by ICE and the United States Customs and Border Protection during the first 18 months (January 20, 2025 to July 31, 2026) of the second Trump administration. The MPI also estimated that between 310,000 and 1.5 million immigrants who had been in the United States for a least one year had self-deported themselves.

== Raid ==
On July 10, 2025, a raid at greenhouses on the Oxnard Plain, led to 319 people being detained and the death of one farmworker, Jaime Alanis Garcia. ICE agents allegedly chased Garcia, who then fell roughly 30 feet (9.1 meters) from the top of a building. Garcia was hospitalized and placed on life support for one day before dying from his injuries on July 11. NBC News described the raid as "chaotic". The detainees were held by ICE for over eight hours, and those among them who were U.S. citizens were allegedly only permitted to leave after deleting video footage of the raid from their phones. United Farm Workers stated that several workers were "totally unaccounted for" in the immediate aftermath of the raid, including at least one U.S. citizen.

During the day, about 500 protestors gathered at the farm, but by 6:30 that evening, their numbers had dwindled to around 200. DHS stated that four U.S. citizens were arrested for "resisting or assaulting officers". ICE agents deployed tear gas against the protestors, and claimed that a protestor shot at them with a handgun during the raid. There were no reports of gunshot wounds from the incident. Jonathan Caravello, a professor at nearby California State University, Channel Islands, was detained after aiding a protestor, and was not heard from for more than 48 hours after his arrest. The U.S. Attorney's Office stated Caravello was charged with assault on a federal officer using a deadly or dangerous weapon after he allegedly threw a tear gas canister at federal agents. Caravello was acquitted of all charges on April 9, 2026. George Retes, a 25-year-old disabled veteran and U.S. citizen working as a security guard, was detained after ICE agents broke his car window and pepper sprayed him.

U.S. Customs and Border Protection stated that 14 undocumented minors were found at the farm, 8 of whom were unaccompanied. DHS stated that these minors were "victims of 'exploitation' and 'potentially human trafficking or smuggling.'"

== Same-day Raid in Carpinteria ==
On the same day, ICE raided another cannabis farm owned by the same company in Carpinteria, in Santa Barbara County. Over 150 protestors soon arrived at the site, and several were injured, including a Carpinteria City Councilor. Congressman Salud Carbajal was also present at the demonstration, and attempted to mediate with the ICE agents. The ICE agents deployed less-lethal munitions at the protestors and elected officials, including flash bangs, smoke grenades, and rubber bullets.

Ten individuals were taken into ICE custody, out of the 12 for whom ICE reportedly had federal judicial warrants at this location. None of the individuals detained had felony convictions, and none were minors. One woman, a mother of three, was deported as a result.

Santa Barbara District Attorney John Savrnoch denounced the raid, stating that the raid "can rightfully be viewed as an attempt to fulfill some xenophobic quota at the expense of disrupting the lives of hard-working immigrants who have become part of the fabric of our society."

== See also ==
- Killing of Renée Good
- Killing of Silverio Villegas González
- Deaths, detentions, and deportations of American citizens in the second Trump administration
- Protests against mass deportation during the second Trump administration
