= Christina A. Snyder =

American judge (born 1947)

Senior Judge of the United States District Court for the Central District of California
- Incumbent
- Assumed office November 23, 2016

Judge of the United States District Court for the Central District of California
- In office November 10, 1997 – November 23, 2016
- Appointed by: Bill Clinton
- Preceded by: Edward Rafeedie
- Succeeded by: Maame Ewusi-Mensah Frimpong

Personal details
- Born: May 27, 1947 (age 78) Los Angeles, California, U.S.
- Education: Pomona College (BA); Stanford University (JD)

Christina Ann Snyder (born May 27, 1947) is a senior United States district judge of the United States District Court for the Central District of California.

== Early life and education ==
Snyder was born on May 27, 1947, in Los Angeles. In 1969, Snyder received a Bachelor of Arts degree from Pomona College. In 1972, Snyder earned a Juris Doctor from Stanford Law School.

== Career ==
In 1972, Snyder practiced law in California until 1997. Snyder was a partner in Wyman Bautzer Kuchel & Silbert, Katten Muchin & Zavis, and Corinblit & Seltzer.

=== Federal judicial service ===
On January 7, 1997, Snyder was nominated by President Bill Clinton to a seat on the United States District Court for the Central District of California vacated by Edward Rafeedie. Snyder was confirmed by the United States Senate on November 7, 1997, and received her commission on November 10, 1997. Snyder assumed senior status on November 23, 2016.

== Awards ==
- 2013 Ronald M. George Award for Judicial Excellence from the Beverly Hills Bar Association (February 20, 2013).

== See also ==
- List of Jewish American jurists

Legal offices
Preceded by Edward Rafeedie	Judge of the United States District Court for the Central District of California; 1997–2016	Succeeded by Maame Ewusi-Mensah Frimpong
