= David W. Williams =

American judge

Senior Judge of the United States District Court for the Central District of California
- In office January 17, 1981 – May 6, 2000

Judge of the United States District Court for the Central District of California
- In office June 20, 1969 – January 17, 1981
- Appointed by: Richard Nixon
- Preceded by: Peirson Mitchell Hall
- Succeeded by: Edward Rafeedie

Personal details
- Born: David Welford Williams; March 20, 1910 Atlanta, Georgia
- Died: May 6, 2000 (aged 90) Los Angeles, California
- Education: University of California, Los Angeles (AB); USC Gould School of Law (LLB)

David Welford Williams (March 20, 1910 – May 6, 2000) was an American attorney and United States district judge of the United States District Court for the Central District of California, the first African-American federal judge west of the Mississippi. He is best known for his work in the abolition of restrictive covenants and for overseeing 4,000 criminal cases that stemmed from the 1965 Watts riots.

== Early life and career ==
Williams was born in Atlanta, Georgia, but grew up in Los Angeles, California. He received an Artium Baccalaureus degree from the University of California, Los Angeles in 1934 and a Bachelor of Laws from the USC Gould School of Law in 1937, and was admitted to the California bar in 1937. He was in private practice in Los Angeles from 1937 to 1955. Williams was a founding member of the John M. Langston Bar Association, a black lawyers' group which was organized in response to the Los Angeles County Bar Association's refusal to admit blacks members.

=== Legal service ===
As a lawyer in the 1940s, he was one of several black attorneys who worked with Thurgood Marshall, then head of the legal defense arm of the NAACP, to fight the restrictive covenants that barred African-Americans and other minorities from residence in many parts of Los Angeles and many other American cities. The covenants were declared unconstitutional in 1948. Williams himself was able to benefit from this decision by purchasing a lot in one of Los Angeles’ most exclusive areas; however, he negotiated this purchase over the telephone for fear that he would not be able to obtain the land if the seller and neighbors realized he was black.

=== State judicial service ===
Williams was appointed to the Los Angeles Municipal Court from 1956, and served there until 1962. He was a judge of the Los Angeles Superior Court from 1962 to 1969. As a judge, Williams developed a reputation as a tough sentencer. Following the 1965 Watts riots, Williams volunteered to preside over about 4,000 of the resulting criminal cases. Taking on these difficult cases in an emotionally charged environment won him the admiration of many colleagues.

=== Federal judicial service ===
A lifelong Republican, Williams was nominated by President Richard Nixon on May 8, 1969, to a seat on the United States District Court for the Central District of California vacated by Judge Peirson Mitchell Hall. He was confirmed by the United States Senate on June 19, 1969, and received his commission on June 20, 1969. He assumed senior status on January 17, 1981. His service terminated on May 6, 2000, due to his death from pneumonia in Los Angeles.

=== Views on mandatory sentencing ===
Late in his judicial career, Williams took issue with the mandatory sentencing required by California's 1994 "Three Strikes Law." “Some of us judges,” he is quoted as saying, “feel we are made to be like robots who cannot decide for themselves.” Ironically, in 1989 he became the first judge in California and the second in the country to impose a mandatory life sentence under a new federal anti-drug law. It was the first time in 35 years as a judge that Williams had ever given a life sentence without possibility of parole.

== See also ==
- Black conservatism in the United States
- List of African-American federal judges
- List of African-American jurists

Legal offices
Preceded by Peirson Mitchell Hall	Judge of the United States District Court for the Central District of California; 1969–1981	Succeeded by Edward Rafeedie
