= Edward Rafeedie =

American judge

Senior Judge of the United States District Court for the Central District of California
- In office January 6, 1996 – March 25, 2008

Judge of the United States District Court for the Central District of California
- In office September 24, 1982 – January 6, 1996
- Appointed by: Ronald Reagan
- Preceded by: David W. Williams
- Succeeded by: Christina A. Snyder

Personal details
- Born: Edward Rafeedie; January 6, 1929 Orange, New Jersey
- Died: March 25, 2008 (aged 79) Malibu, California
- Education: University of Southern California (B.S.); USC Gould School of Law (J.D.)

Edward Rafeedie (January 6, 1929 – March 25, 2008) was a United States district judge of the United States District Court for the Central District of California.

== Early life and career ==
Rafeedie was born to Palestinian immigrants in Orange, New Jersey. His family moved to Santa Monica, California when he was seven years old. He lived for a while in the Middle East before moving back to California. After graduating from Venice High School in 1946, Rafeedie traveled the carnival circuit with a portable electric horse-race game called Derby. He attended Los Angeles City College from 1946 to 1947.

He served in the United States Army from 1950 to 1952 during the Korean War. He then attended Santa Monica College from 1954 to 1955 and University of Southern California Law Center, where he graduated with a Bachelor of Science degree in 1957 and a Juris Doctor in 1959. Afterwards, he worked in private practice in Santa Monica from 1959 to 1969.

== State judicial service ==
Rafeedie was appointed as a Municipal Court Judge in 1969 by California Governor Ronald Reagan. In 1971, Governor Reagan elevated him to the Superior Court, where he served a total of 11 years. During his tenure on the Superior Court, Rafeedie presided over several high-profile civil cases, including the contested conservatorship of Groucho Marx, the Britt Ekland and Rod Stewart palimony trial and part of the Bob Dylan divorce case. He also sentenced the daredevil Evel Knievel to jail for attacking a television executive with a baseball bat. Rafeedie was also known for his calendar management of cases and his concern about efficient management of trials. His nickname was, "Speedie Rafeedie," because of his penchant for denying trial continuances.

== Federal judicial service ==
Rafeedie was nominated by President Ronald Reagan on August 24, 1982, to a seat on the United States District Court for the Central District of California vacated by Judge David W. Williams. He was confirmed by the United States Senate on September 22, 1982, and received commission on September 24, 1982. He assumed senior status on January 6, 1996. His service was terminated on March 25, 2008, due to death.

== Notable case ==
Rafeedie's most controversial case was in 1990, when he ruled that the kidnapping of Dr. Humberto Alvarez Machain was illegal and ordered his repatriation to Mexico. Alvarez Machain was accused of aiding drug traffickers in the 1985 torturing and killing of Enrique "Kiki" Camarena, who was a Drug Enforcement Administration agent. Because the DEA had paid a group of Mexican citizens to kidnap him in Mexico and fly him to the United States to stand trial, Rafeedie ruled that the kidnapping was a violation of the United States-Mexico extradition treaty. He commented after the ruling that "There has to be stronger evidence than you have offered to find that a man is guilty of kidnapping, murder and torture. This does not rise to the level required to get this case to the jury." The ruling stunned the Justice Department and angered government agents. However, the United States Supreme Court later overruled his decision, holding that the extradition treaty did not prohibit kidnapping. This was due to a ruling that stated the United States Government had the right to kidnap and prosecute an alleged criminal regardless of the treaty. Immediately thereafter, a large number of countries holding treaties with the United States demanded that their treaties be amended, adding anti-kidnapping language.

== Death ==
Rafeedie died from cancer in Malibu, California on March 25, 2008, at the age of 79. He was buried at Holy Cross Cemetery, Culver City, California.

== Sources ==
Legal offices
Preceded by David W. Williams	Judge of the United States District Court for the Central District of California; 1982–1996	Succeeded by Christina A. Snyder
