= Maame Ewusi-Mensah Frimpong =

American judge (born 1976)

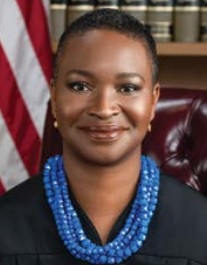

Judge of the United States District Court for the Central District of California
- Incumbent
- Assumed office February 7, 2022
- Appointed by: Joe Biden
- Preceded by: Christina A. Snyder

Judge of the Los Angeles County Superior Court
- In office November 17, 2015 – February 7, 2022
- Appointed by: Jerry Brown
- Preceded by: Thomas R. White
- Succeeded by: Adrian Gidaya Roxas

Personal details
- Born: Maame Abena Famanyame Ewusi-Mensah; 1976 (age 49–50) Los Angeles, California, U.S.
- Party: Democratic
- Education: Harvard University (BA); Yale University (JD)

Maame Ewusi-Mensah Frimpong (née Maame Abena Famanyame Ewusi-Mensah; born 1976) is an American attorney serving as a United States district judge of the United States District Court for the Central District of California. She previously served as a judge of the Los Angeles County Superior Court from 2015 to 2022.

== Early life and education ==
Frimpong was born in 1976 in Los Angeles and raised in Los Angeles County, California to Kwaku Ewusi-Mensah and Theodora Ewusi-Mensah, immigrants from Ghana. She attended The Webb Schools, a private boarding school in Claremont, California, graduating as valedictorian of her class in 1993.

Frimpong graduated from Harvard University in 1997 with a Bachelor of Arts, magna cum laude. From 1997 to 1998, she was a volunteer computer science teacher at a school in Accra, Ghana. She then attended Yale Law School, where she was an editor of the Yale Law Journal and the Yale Law & Policy Review. She received a Juris Doctor in 2001.

== Career ==
From 2001 to 2002, Frimpong served as a law clerk for Judge Stephen Reinhardt of the United States Court of Appeals for the Ninth Circuit. She then worked as an associate at Morrison & Foerster from 2002 to 2007. From 2007 to 2015, she served in various positions in the United States Department of Justice, including in the Civil Division. In 2015, Frimpong became vice president, general counsel and corporate secretary of the Millennium Challenge Corporation.

In 2015, she was appointed by Governor Jerry Brown to serve as a judge of the Los Angeles County Superior Court to fill the vacancy left by the retirement of Thomas R. White.

=== Federal judicial service ===
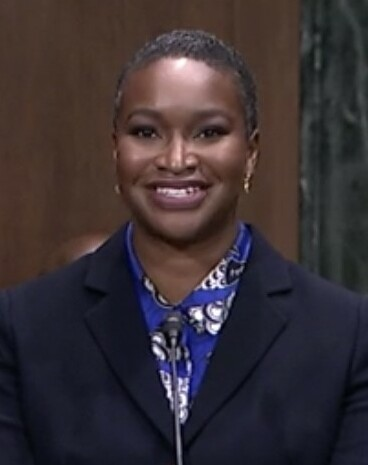
Frimpong during her hearing with the Senate Judiciary Committee

On September 8, 2021, President Joe Biden announced his intent to nominate Frimpong to serve as a United States district judge of the United States District Court for the Central District of California. Her nomination helped to fulfill President Biden’s pledge to appoint more female and minority judges; the White House press release announcing her nomination noted that Frimpong “would be the first Black woman to serve on the Ninth Circuit from California, as well as the second Black woman to ever serve on the Ninth Circuit.” On September 20, 2021, her nomination was sent to the Senate. President Biden nominated Frimpong to the seat vacated by Judge Christina A. Snyder, who assumed senior status on November 23, 2016. On October 20, 2021, a hearing on her nomination was held before the Senate Judiciary Committee. On December 2, 2021, her nomination was reported out of committee by a 12–10 vote. On December 17, 2021, the United States Senate invoked cloture on her nomination by a 47–24 vote. Her nomination was confirmed later that day by a 46–24 vote. She received her judicial commission on February 7, 2022.

=== Notable rulings ===
On August 1, 2025, Frimpong blocked the Trump administration's "roving" immigration arrests amid its large-scale immigration crackdown in Los Angeles, saying aspects of the operation were unconstitutional.

She ruled that ICE agents were conducting "roving patrols" of the city and coordinating arrests without "reasonable suspicion" that their targets were in the country illegally. She also ruled that they have been relying on improper factors including race, accent, and occupation.

An appeal by the federal government to the Supreme Court of the United States requesting a stay of the order was granted by the Court on September 8, 2025. The case continues through the federal court system.

== See also ==
- List of African-American federal judges
- List of African-American jurists

Legal offices
Preceded by Christina A. Snyder	Judge of the United States District Court for the Central District of California; 2022–present	Incumbent
