= June 2025 Los Angeles protests against mass deportation =

Series of protests in California, U.S.

June 2025 Los Angeles protests
- Part of protests against mass deportation during the second Trump administration, and domestic military deployments by the second Trump administration
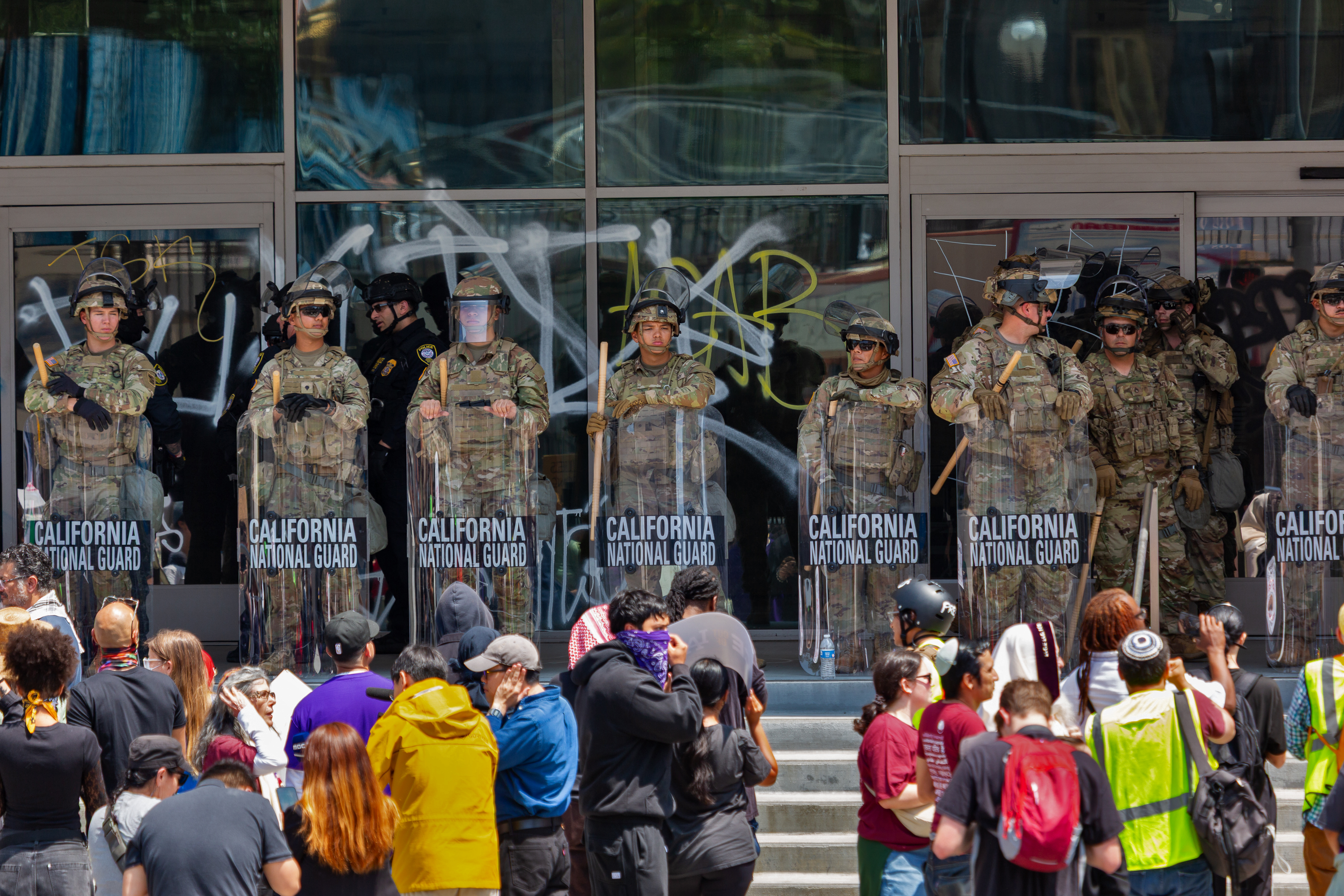
- California National Guard and protestors on June 9
- Date: June 6 – July 15, 2025 (1 month, 1 week and 2 days)
- Location: Los Angeles metropolitan area, California, U.S.
- Caused by: Deportation and extrajudicial detention in the second presidency of Donald Trump
- Methods: Demonstrations; Civil disobedience; Civil unrest; Civil resistance; Arson; Looting; Traffic obstruction; Barricades; Internet activism
- Result: Most protests suppressed: State of emergency declared in Los Angeles County; Federal forces enter Los Angeles and adjacent communities

Parties
Protesters: Coalition for Humane Immigrant Rights of Los Angeles; Unión del Barrio; Community Self-Defense Coalition; Centro CSO; Service Employees International Union; Indivisible movement; 50501 movement; Democratic Socialists of America; Party for Socialism and Liberation; Revolutionary Communists of America; Angel City Brigade; Unaffiliated individuals	United States federal government: Department of Homeland Security; Federal Protective Service; Customs and Border Protection; Border Patrol; Immigration and Customs Enforcement; Homeland Security Investigations; Enforcement and Removal Operations; Department of Justice; Federal Bureau of Investigation; Bureau of Alcohol, Tobacco, Firearms and Explosives; Marshals Service; Department of Defense; United States Northern Command; Joint Task Force 51; California National Guard (federalized); 79th Infantry Brigade Combat Team; 49th Military Police Brigade; United States Marine Corps; Camp Pendleton garrison; Department of State; Bureau of Diplomatic Security; Diplomatic Security Service; California state government: Los Angeles Police Department; Los Angeles County Sheriff's Department; Ventura County Sheriff's Office; California Highway Patrol; Santa Paula Police Department; Orange County Sheriff's Department; Santa Barbara County Sheriff's Office; San Bernardino County Sheriff's Department; Santa Ana Police Department; Pasadena Police Department; Monterey Park Police Department

Lead figures
	Donald Trump; JD Vance; Kristi Noem; Pete Hegseth; Scott Sherman; Gavin Newsom; Karen Bass

Number
1,000+ protesters (per ICE) (June 6)	At its height: 4,100 California National Guard troops 700 Marines; Unknown number of local, county, state, and federal police

Casualties and losses
At least 3 injured >575 arrested	17+ injured 5 horses injured
- At least 7 journalists injured by the LAPD

On June 6, 2025, protests began in Los Angeles after Immigration and Customs Enforcement (ICE) agents raided locations in the region to arrest individuals allegedly involved in illegal immigration to the United States. Some protests turned into riots after protestors clashed with the Los Angeles Police Department (LAPD) and ICE, (Note: Sources have described some of the protests as being "riots" or "riots and protests", or simply "violent protests".) but most remained peaceful and occurred within a small stretch of downtown Los Angeles. (Note: Sources describe the majority of protests as peaceful and contained to a small part of the city.)

On June 7, protestors and federal law enforcement agents clashed in Paramount and Compton during raids. President Donald Trump responded by federalizing the California National Guard, calling for 2,000 guard members to deploy to the city under Joint Task Force 51. Protests were organized and attended by multiple groups and unaffiliated protestors. On June 9, the president authorized the deployment of an additional 2,000 National Guard members, and the Pentagon activated 700 Marines to deploy to the city, who arrived the next day. Critics, including California governor Gavin Newsom (who has sued Trump over the federalization), described the military response as premature, inflammatory, for political gain, and authoritarian. Reuters reported that the protests were the strongest domestic backlash to Trump since he took office in January, and became a focal point in a national debate over immigration, protest, the use of federal force in domestic affairs, the boundaries of presidential power, and freedom of speech and assembly.

On July 11, U.S. district judge Maame Ewusi-Mensah Frimpong concluded that the administration likely violated immigrants' rights and ordered a stop to immigration arrests without probable cause, alleging that the administration targeted California residents based on race, language and place of work. The ruling was upheld by the United States Court of Appeals for the Ninth Circuit. On September 3, U.S. district judge Charles Breyer ruled the deployment of the military illegal and a violation of the Posse Comitatus Act, and ordered the administration not to use National Guard or military troops for civilian law enforcement in California. Breyer found the rationale for deployment as contrived, writing that "There was no rebellion, nor was civilian law enforcement unable to respond to the protests and enforce the law." Prosecutors failed to secure indictments for the majority of protestors charged and dropped several cases after DHS agents were found to have made false statements.

The anti-ICE protests in Los Angeles inspired additional anti-ICE protests in other U.S. cities, such as New York City, Chicago, and Dallas.

== Background ==
Protests and movements against ICE have been seen throughout the United States, with a major movement seen in Abolish ICE, which gained mainstream traction in June 2018, following the Trump administration family separation policy. Prior protests against ICE and anti-mass deportations were seen in California in February 2025, shortly after Donald Trump's election in the 2024 United States presidential election.

In November 2024, following Trump's election, the Los Angeles City Council declared the city to be a sanctuary city. Trump's immigration policy elicited concern from California's immigrant population. Trump officials have warned that sanctuary cities would be the target of immigration crackdown efforts. During his 2024 presidential campaign, Trump said he would use the military to end protests without consent from state governors, actions which his aides had talked him out of during his first term. He also stated he would use the military against "the enemy within".

In May 2025, the Trump administration began to implement a deportation strategy that involved targeting workplaces.

== Events ==
=== June 6 ===
At approximately 9:15 a.m. PDT on June 6, an immigration raid was conducted within the Los Angeles Fashion District; two other raids occurred at a clothing wholesaler and a Home Depot in Westlake. Agents present at the raid were identified with Federal Bureau of Investigation, Homeland Security Investigations, and Bureau of Alcohol, Tobacco, Firearms and Explosives patches. Homeland Security Investigations stated that 44 people were arrested for suspected immigration violations and one person was arrested for obstruction. Bill Essayli, the acting United States Attorney for the Central District of California, said that David Huerta, the California president of the Service Employees International Union, was arrested for blocking a vehicle and charged with felony conspiracy to impede an officer. Huerta was injured and taken to the hospital, where he was transferred to the Metropolitan Detention Center. Angelica Salas, the director of the Coalition for Humane Immigrant Rights of Los Angeles, stated that there were seven raids in which 45 people had been detained.

Clashes between protesters and ICE agents in riot gear occurred near the Westlake Home Depot. ICE also arrested several people at a clothing store and clashed with activists. Crowds formed in the evening outside the Metropolitan Detention Center. Approximately 200 protesters remained at the facility by 7 p.m., when the Los Angeles Police Department declared the protest to be an unlawful assembly and ordered protesters to disperse. LAPD was brought to stop civil unrest after crowds graffitied slogans on a federal court building and gathered outside a jail. After "some protesters hurled chunks of broken concrete toward officers", the LAPD engaged in intense standoffs with protestors in which tear gas, pepper spray, and flash-bang grenades were used to disperse the crowd. The police department authorized the use of less-lethal munitions the following hour. This was followed at 8:24 p.m. by a citywide tactical alert.

=== June 7 ===
Protests continued through June 7. According to Peggy Lemons, the mayor of Paramount, California, a confrontation near a Home Depot in Paramount began after protesters observed Department of Homeland Security (DHS) officers staging near a local branch building. (Note: Protests at the Home Depot in Paramount were motivated by reports of an immigration raid at the location. However, officials told the BBC that the reports of a raid at the Home Depot were false. Both the BBC and the Washington Examiner called the Home Depot reports "misinformation".) The DHS estimated that one thousand people were protesting and had surrounded the building. According to The New York Times, the protests delayed processing of detainees. California Governor Gavin Newsom announced that California Highway Patrol units would be deployed to protect Los Angeles freeways. By June 7, 118 undocumented immigrants had been arrested in Los Angeles, according to the DHS.

In Paramount, protestors blocked a street with shopping carts and a recycling bin. Federal agents then deployed flash bang grenades and pepper balls, injuring two people. Protesters threw rocks and cement at United States Border Patrol cars. According to an attorney with the Coalition for Humane Immigrant Rights of Los Angeles, some protestors were throwing bricks, and others looked injured. At 2:30 p.m., LAPD issued a dispersal order using loudspeakers. Los Angeles County Sheriff's Department deputies then used tear gas against the protesters to disperse them. One ICE agent sustained injuries after a rock thrown by a protestor struck the windshield on the vehicle they were driving and cut their hand. At around 8 p.m., two people were arrested on suspicion of assaulting police officers, including one who allegedly threw a Molotov cocktail, causing minor injuries to three deputies.

Protesters also gathered at the Metropolitan Detention Center in Downtown Los Angeles, with law enforcement forming a skirmish line to disperse the protesters. Shortly before 11 p.m., protestors threw an object at and hit a police cruiser as it was leaving the area at an intersection in Downtown Los Angeles. By night, the protests reached Compton, where several demonstrators threw glass bottles filled with a substance that reportedly smelled like gasoline.

In an interview with Fox News, White House Executive Associate Director of Enforcement and Removal Operations Tom Homan announced that the National Guard would be sent into Los Angeles that night. That evening, President Donald Trump signed a memorandum deploying 2,000 members of the California National Guard to the protests; the memorandum specified that the deployment would last for either 60 days, or for a length of time "at the discretion of the secretary of defense". Trump invoked 10 U.S.C. § 12406 to federalize the National Guard. In a tweet, Secretary of Defense Pete Hegseth stated that active duty Marines were on "high alert" at Camp Pendleton.

=== June 8 ===
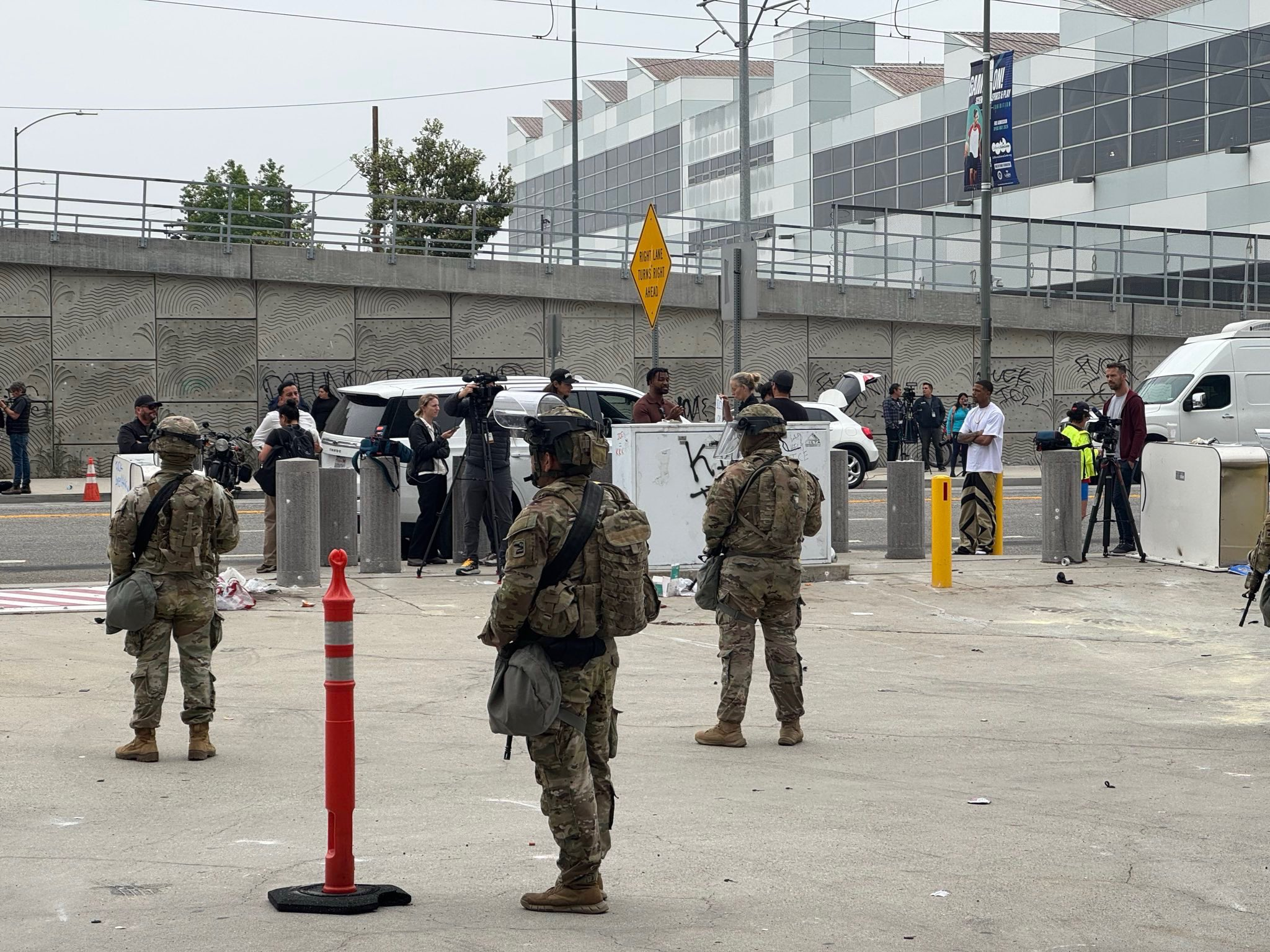
California National Guard in the city on June 8

Protests died down in the early morning of June 8, but were still ongoing, with organizers calling for another day of protesting. At 11:30 a.m., Centro CSO held a rally followed by a march to the detention center in downtown Los Angeles. Protests outside of Los Angeles City Hall occurred around 2 p.m.

Three hundred California Army National Guard troops from the 79th Infantry Brigade Combat Team were deployed to three separate locations in Los Angeles; most of the troops were seen outside of federal buildings. Under the direction of Hegseth, approximately 500 active-duty Marines from the Marine Corps Air Ground Combat Center Twentynine Palms were put on a "prepared to deploy" status. At the Metropolitan Detention Center (MDC), the National Guard and DHS officers used smoke and pepper spray to displace protesters and make way for DHS, Border Patrol, and military vehicles to enter the facility. National Guard troops also arrived outside the MDC. Police had arrived to join the National Guard by noon.

Homan commented, while speaking to NBC News, that "someone's going to lose their life" if the protests continued, also noting that governor of California Gavin Newsom and mayor of Los Angeles Karen Bass could potentially face federal charges over the response to the ICE raids. Trump later threatened to "have troops everywhere" if the protests spread to other cities and said "if we see danger to our country and our citizens", the Marines would be deployed to the city.

At 2:30 p.m., the LAPD Central Division announced that the City of Los Angeles is on "tactical alert". The LAPD Central Division later announced that less-lethal munitions had been authorized for use to disperse the protest, people throwing objects at officers would be arrested, and that the Incident commander had declared an unlawful assembly. Two LAPD officers were injured after motorcyclists attempted to breach a skirmish line and hit them at a protest in the Alameda and Temple area. Both riders were detained and the officers were treated at the scene. The Los Angeles Police Department announced that a number of people were arrested at the Civic Center area of Downtown Los Angeles, including several people who were detained and handcuffed with zip ties.

Before 4 p.m., protestors entered the U.S. 101 freeway in downtown Los Angeles and blocked traffic, causing police to subsequently shut down the freeway in both directions. The LAPD announced that parts of the freeway and multiple streets were closed to drivers as a result of protests. Police reported people were shooting fireworks at officers. Rocks, scooters, and cinder blocks were thrown at police cars. People attempted to set police cruisers on fire. Protesters also threw cinder blocks at police officers and other people. Five Waymo driverless cars were vandalized, set alight, and destroyed. LAPD officials warned that burning lithium-ion batteries releases toxic gasses. The following day, Waymo suspended service and removed their vehicles in Downtown Los Angeles. A spokesperson for the company said they do not believe the cars were intentionally targeted. The service remained in operation in other areas of Los Angeles. At around 4 p.m., Newsom sent a letter to Secretary Hegseth requesting him to rescind Trump's order to deploy the National Guard, calling it a "serious breach of state sovereignty".

By night, the LAPD also announced on their social media that the entire downtown Los Angeles area was considered to be an unlawful assembly and urged everyone to leave the area.

The LAPD reported that looting had occurred at Downtown Los Angeles stores in the area of 6th Street and Broadway, as well as near 8th Street and Broadway. Also, several fires were reportedly set in dumpsters and trash bins. Numerous buildings, including the Los Angeles Police Department Headquarters, the United States Courthouse, and the old Los Angeles Times Building, were tagged with graffiti. At least one store had windows shattered by alleged looters. Multiple windows at the Los Angeles Police Department headquarters were also broken.

The United States Northern Command established a formal task force, Task Force 51, to coordinate the military response. An official statement said "as USNORTHCOM's land component command, U.S. Army North stood up Task Force 51, with a two-star general, as the ground command and control element over the Title 10 forces." (Note: Title 10 forces are activated by and under the authority of the president; whereas, Title 32 activation is by a state's governor and the forces are under state control.) The task force was commanded by Major General Scott Sherman.

Late in the night, the City of Glendale, California, decided to terminate its detention agreement with ICE, in part as a reaction to the protests and unrest in Los Angeles.

=== June 9 ===
'U.S. Marines arrive in greater Los Angeles area to support Task Force 51' video published by DOD

In the early afternoon of June 9, SEIU organized a rally at Grand Park with thousands of participants. Senators Adam Schiff (D-CA) and Alex Padilla (D-CA) sent a letter to the Department of Homeland Security and Department of Justice demanding that a review of the arrest of Huerta be performed. Huerta was released later that afternoon from custody on a $50,000 bond. Centro CSO held a press conference followed by a rally at Mariachi Plaza at 5:30 p.m., followed by a march to Hollenbeck Police Station in Boyle Heights.

Protestors vandalized a federal building with graffiti and chanted "National Guard, Out of LA", "ICE out of LA", "Trump out of LA" and "Shame on you" in the streets. Guards with riot shields warned protestors to stay off of the property and stick to the sidewalk. After night fell, many protesters were detained with zip-ties before being loaded onto a Los Angeles Police Department bus. Other protestors threw objects at police, including fireworks. A Telemundo news van was also vandalized by protestors. Police threw flash bangs and shot rubber bullets at a crowd of protestors downtown after telling people to clear the area and stop throwing things on a loudspeaker. Several stores were looted including an Apple Store, an Adidas store, a jewelry store, and pharmacies. The words "No ICE" were spray painted on broken store windows. The Los Angeles Police Department declared a tactical alert adding that "all uniformed personnel are to remain on duty". Around 9 p.m., CNN correspondent Jason Carroll was detained and two of his camera crew were arrested. As of 9:30 p.m., police officers and deputies still maintained a large presence, but all protesters had left the area, and a cleanup effort had begun to clear debris in the streets, sweep up glass, and paint over messages/graffiti.

Speaking to reporters at the White House, Trump described the protesters as "insurrectionists" and then later via Truth Social while also placing the blame on Governor Newsom. Many in the media speculated that this language could give him a rationale for invoking the 1807 Insurrection Act. Trump further suggested that Governor Newsom should be arrested, saying, "I would do it if I were Tom", referring to Tom Homan, whom Newsom has taunted to go to California to arrest him. Newsom responded shortly after, saying: "This is a day I hoped I would never see in America" and "this is an unmistakable step toward authoritarianism."

By midday, the number of National Guard troops deployed to Los Angeles had increased from 300 to 1,000. CNN and NBC 4 Los Angeles reported that, per the Pentagon, 700 Marines from Marine Corps Base Twentynine Palms—drawn from the 2nd Battalion, 7th Marines—would deploy to Los Angeles alongside the National Guard. The same day, an additional 2,000 National Guard members were authorized by Trump for deployment, bringing the total to more than 4,100. United States Northern Command stated the forces would operate under "Task Force 51", which referred to the military designation of LA forces. The Trump administration promoted that more troops were in LA than serving in Iraq or Syria, and suggested more troops would be deployed in more cities.

Media reports described soldiers as not receiving sufficient tents, portable bathrooms, or dumpsters when they were deployed to Los Angeles, and that it was unknown where the soldiers would sleep as of June 9. Senior military leaders said the soldiers would continue sleeping on floors or outdoors until June 12, at which point federal officials would decide whether to make plans for more permanent lodging. The Guardian reported that several dozen Marines and California National Guard troops were "deeply unhappy" about the deployment and felt like "pawns in a political battle they do not want to join".

Late Monday night, the San Francisco Chronicle published a leaked letter from Secretary of Homeland Security Kristi Noem to US Defense Secretary Pete Hegseth that requested "[d]irection to DoD forces to either detain, just as they would at any federal facility guarded by military, lawbreakers under Title 18 until they can be arrested and processed by federal law enforcement, or arrest them." Noem also asked for "drone surveillance support" as well as weapons and logistics assistance in Los Angeles.

=== June 10 ===
Area under curfew, Scale 1 kilometre (0.62 mi); click for more detail

Further protests occurred in the afternoon of June 10 in the downtown area outside the 300 North Los Angeles Street Federal Building, the Edward R. Roybal Federal Building, and the Metropolitan Detention Center. The gathering was declared an unlawful assembly by the LAPD slightly after 2 p.m. Police began arrests of the protesters around 3 p.m. following a dispersal order. Protestors also again moved onto the US 101 freeway briefly, before being dispersed by police.

By June 10, the number of National Guard members deployed to Los Angeles had reached 2,100. National Guardsmen began being seen accompanying and protecting ICE agents as they made immigration arrests. The 700 Marines that had been deployed also arrived in the greater Los Angeles area on this day.

Mayor Bass declared a local state of emergency and announced a curfew covering just over 1 square mile (2.6 km^{2}) of downtown Los Angeles from 8 p.m. to 6 a.m., due to concerns over the vandalism by graffiti of 23 businesses and the looting of others. The area under curfew is bordered by the I-5, I-10, and I-110 freeways. The affected neighborhoods included Fashion District, Financial District, Skid Row, Arts District, and Chinatown. A woman walking near her residence was shot point blank by LAPD with less lethal ammunition. Los Angeles Metro Rail and Metro Bus service through downtown was also curtailed for approximately one hour before being resumed.

=== June 11 ===
Three separate protests occurred in downtown Los Angeles in the afternoon of June 11. An hour before the 8 p.m. curfew took effect, LAPD officers at City Hall declared one such an unlawful assembly, whereupon mounted police charged at the protestors and munitions were fired; batons were also used.

Councilmember Mario Trujillo reported that immigration raids took place on June 11 at multiple locations in Downey, including Home Depot, LA Fitness, on the sidewalk in front of the Our Lady of Perpetual Help Church, and at the Downey Memorial Christian Church. Immigrant rights organization CHIRLA estimated that based on reports from family members, approximately 300 immigrants have been detained from June 6 to 11. The organization stated it was unable to determine the locations of many of the detained people, having only been able to speak to five in federal detention.

In Boyle Heights, at the intersection of Calzona Street on Whittier Boulevard, masked DHS agents in unmarked cars pinned and rammed a vehicle occupied by four civilians; a US citizen named Christian Damian Cerno-Camacho, his wife, and their two infant children. Agents fired a pepper ball into the Mercedes sedan and ordered Cerno-Camacho out of the vehicle at gunpoint, detaining and driving off with him. Bystanders provided support to Cerno-Camacho's wife and children, and filed an incident report with LAPD. The Los Angeles Fire Department and LAPD responded to the scene, the former stating there was no evidence of a crash and no need for paramedics. A store's security footage of the incident spread on social media; in response, Department of Homeland Security confirmed they were responsible on Twitter, stating "This was no hit and run. This was a targeted arrest of a violent rioter who punched a CBP officer. When Homeland Security Investigations tried to arrest Christian Damian Cerno-Camacho for the assault, he attempted to flee. He was ultimately arrested and taken into custody."

=== June 12 ===
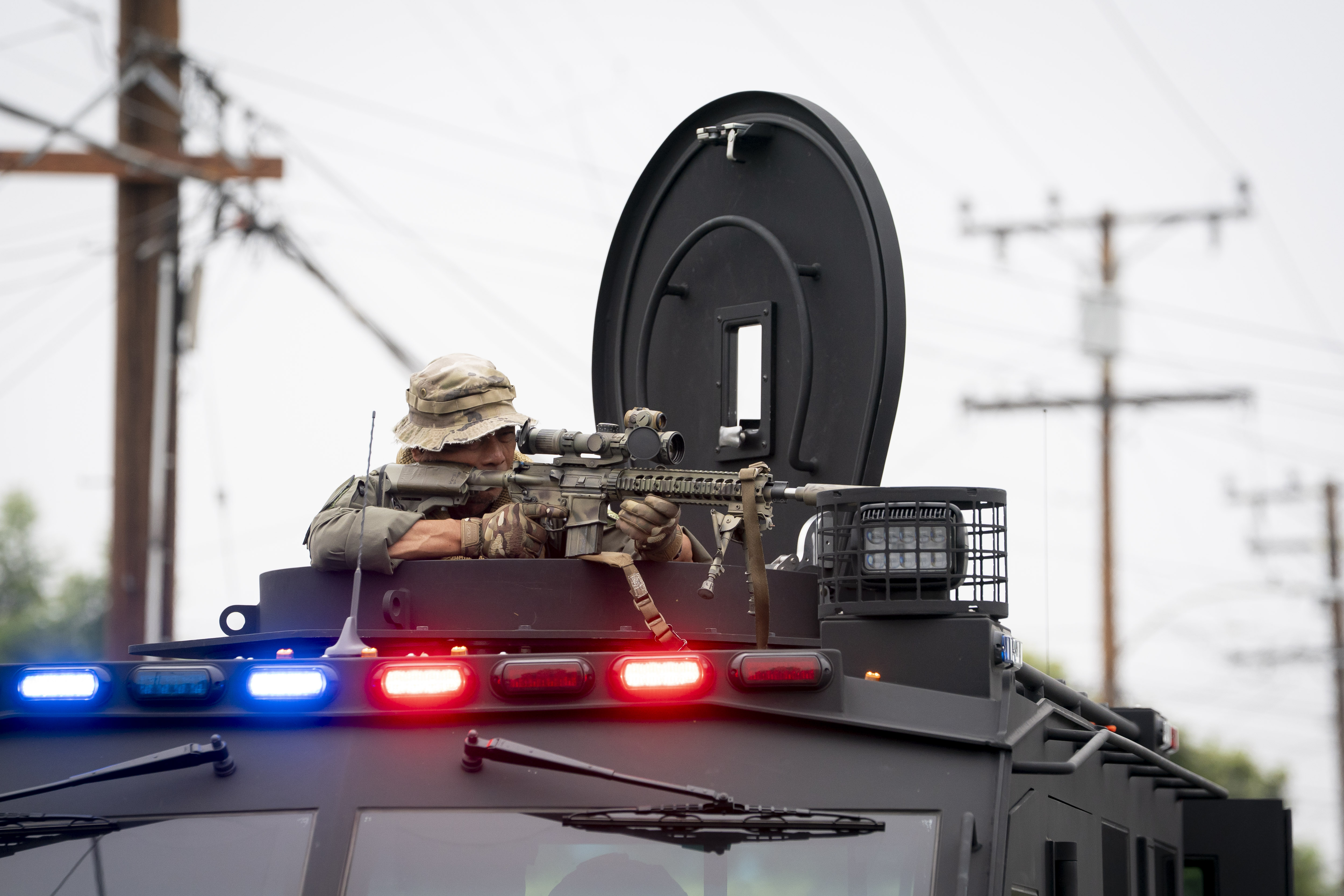
Law enforcement officer in an armored vehicle aiming an assault rifle

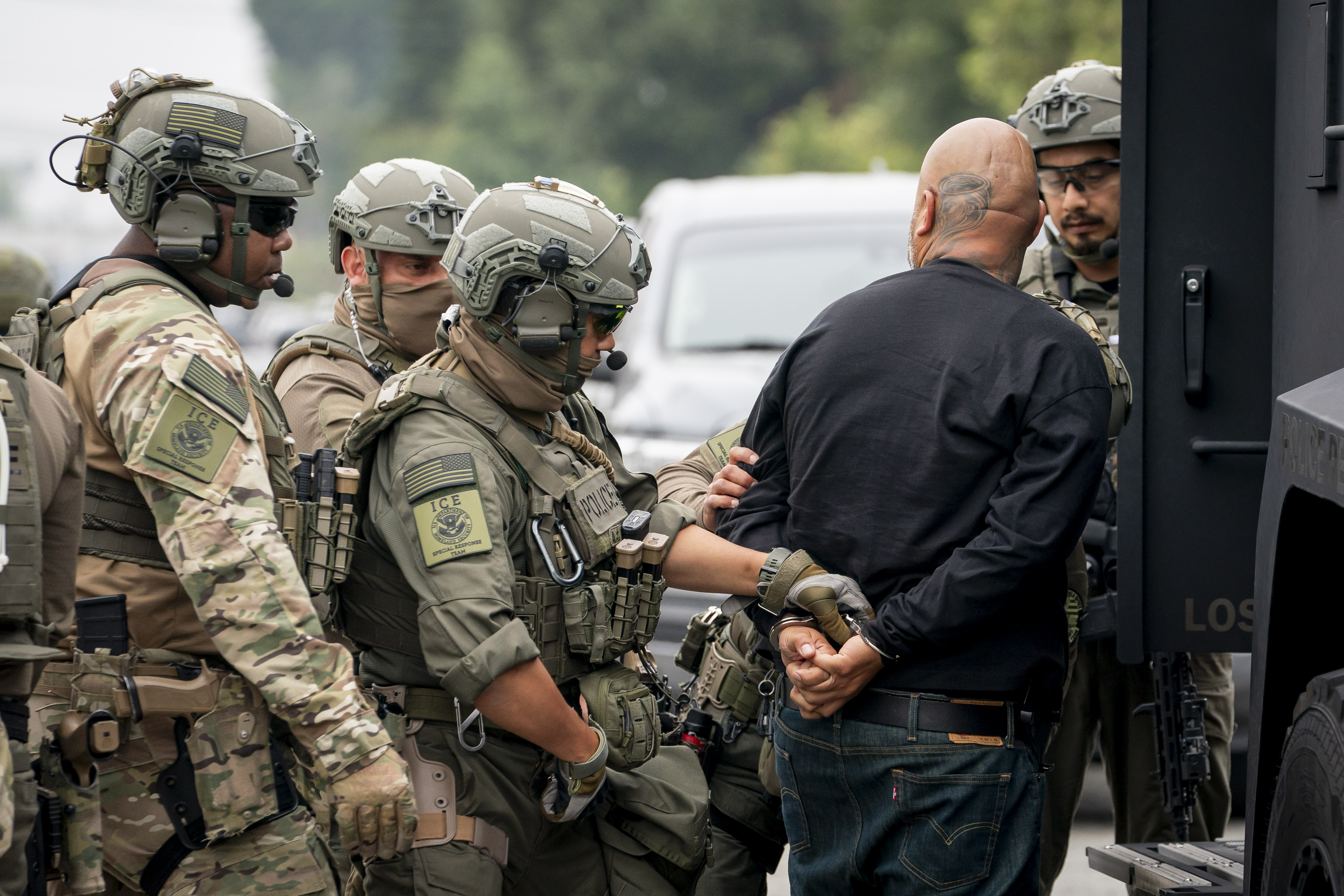
ICE agents arrest a man during an enforcement operation on June 12

There were no reports of protests or demonstrations in downtown LA on the morning of June 12.

After Senator Alex Padilla interjected and attempted to ask a question at a press conference held by Secretary of Homeland Security Kristi Noem in LA, he was forcibly removed. Once outside the room, he was pushed face-down to the ground and handcuffed. In a statement afterwards, Padilla said: "If this is how this administration responds to a senator with a question ... I can only imagine what they are doing to farmworkers, to cooks, to day laborers throughout the Los Angeles community, and throughout California and throughout the country." The episode sparked outrage among lawmakers, demanding an investigation. Just before Padilla was removed from the press conference, Noem said that the administration planned to "liberate" Los Angeles from the governor's and mayor's "burdensome leadership".

Senior US District Judge Charles Breyer ruled that Trump's federalization of California's National Guard was illegal and ordered him to return control of the troops to the State of California by mid-day the next day. The Ninth Circuit appeals court immediately blocked the order to give Trump one week to appeal.

Trump, in a Truth Social post, announced a stop on ICE raids at farms, hotels and restaurants, citing the negative impact of the raids on the agriculture, hotel, and leisure industries. In addition to residents in the curfew zone, persons going to and from work, first responders, and those responding to emergencies, who were already exempted, curfew exemptions were also granted to attendees of events at the Mark Taper Forum and Dorothy Chandler Pavilion, which were cancelled previous nights.

=== June 13 ===
On June 13, the Marines detained a civilian outside the Wilshire Federal Building, the first known instance of them doing so at the Los Angeles protests.

=== June 14 ===
On June 14, multiple "No Kings" protests were held in Los Angeles together with the ongoing anti-ICE protests. At 12:02 p.m., the LAPD issued a traffic warning for the Civic Center, the Historic Core, and the Financial District due to the combined protests. A crowd numbering a few hundred protested in front of the Los Angeles Federal Building, booing and chanting "shame" at the Marines and National Guard members stationed there. At around 5:00 p.m., three hours before the curfew, police dispersed a crowd of 30,000 protestors at Grand Park, firing tear gas and rubber bullets. At least one demonstrator was hospitalized with a head injury from a rubber bullet. Multiple LAPD officers were also hit by rubber bullets and tear gas canisters fired by LASD. The crowd was later dispersed from the Federal Building by police.

=== June 17 ===
On June 17, the Trump administration activated an additional 2,000 National Guard troops from the 49th Military Police Brigade to Los Angeles.

On the morning of June 17, a 20-year-old Walmart employee and U.S. citizen witnessed Border Patrol agents arresting another employee in front of the store in Pico Rivera. After he moved the other employee's trash can in front of the agents' vehicle, agents shoved the first employee to the ground and arrested him, with prosecutor Bill Essayli claiming he punched an agent in the face, though bystander video did not show this. That night, friends of the arrested employee held a protest in Pico Rivera, chanting "ICE out of Pico" and waving Mexican and American flags.

Trump reversed his own policy on agriculture, hotel, and other worksite raids from June 12. He also released a statement on social media directing ICE to prioritize deportations in Democratic-run cities, listing Los Angeles, Chicago and New York City as examples.

The downtown Los Angeles curfew was ended by Bass; it had been modified to run from 10 p.m. to 6 a.m. the previous night.

=== June 18 ===
On June 18, roughly 500 California National Guard soldiers attached to Task Force 51 were deployed to assist multiple federal law enforcement agencies in raids on a large marijuana growth operation 130 miles from Los Angeles in the eastern Coachella Valley. A NORTHCOM spokesperson stated that the "catalyst of this order was related to events occurring in Los Angeles; however, the president's order and NORTHCOM's mission is not constrained by the geography of Southern California".

=== June 19 ===
On June 19, protesters gathered outside Dodger Stadium after the Los Angeles Dodgers reported that ICE agents attempted to enter and were turned away. DHS disputed this, saying the agents were from CBP and that they were not attempting to enter the stadium. A scheduled game between the Dodgers and the San Diego Padres was held as planned.

Judges Mark J. Bennett, Eric D. Miller, and Jennifer Sung of the U.S. Court of Appeals for the Ninth Circuit reversed Judge Breyer's June 12 order and granted Trump's motion for a stay pending appeal. This reversal allows the federal government to maintain control of the National Guard in Los Angeles.

=== June 20 ===
Multiple immigration raids continued throughout Los Angeles County on June 20, including the suburb area of Bell, where federal agents were met by hundreds of protestors while attempting to arrest workers at a local car wash.

The Los Angeles Dodgers released a statement that they will coordinate with the City of Los Angeles to help immigrant communities affected by the raids by donating $1 million for legal services. Vice President JD Vance arrived in Los Angeles in the late afternoon and visited the Wilshire Federal Building. He failed to meet state and local authorities, and denied all local press from attending his media conference, before leaving to attend a Republican National Committee fundraiser. He said that Los Angeles needs to be "liberated from immigrants" and mocked local officials, including calling his former senate colleague Senator Alex Padilla "José Padilla".

=== June 24 ===
On June 24, around 9:00 a.m., masked agents detained several people, including two street vendors and a US citizen, near East 9th Street and South Spring Street. A crowd of people amassed protesting the arrests. LAPD officers were deployed to the area around 9:10 a.m., after a 911 call reported a kidnapping in progress, and began assisting agents with crowd control. A demonstration denouncing LAPD for collaborating with ICE was held outside LAPD headquarters in the afternoon.

=== July 7 ===
On July 7, roughly 90 Guardsmen joined several federal agencies led by Greg Bovino in a "show of force" at MacArthur Park in central Los Angeles in mid-day, with armored vehicles, agents on horseback and brandished weapons. Mayor Bass arrived at the scene and stated "I think that's a message that they're testing in LA to see how much will Angelenos put up with, and that they're going to roll it out around the country."

Defense officials stated it was not a military operation, but acknowledged the size and scope could make it look like one to the public. After confronting Mayor Bass, photographing their own presence, federal forces left after one hour.

=== July 15 ===
On July 15, 2,000 of the National Guard's 79th Infantry Brigade Combat Team were withdrawn from Los Angeles by the Pentagon. This came almost a week after the U.S. Northern Command General Gregory Guillot requested to Secretary of Defense Pete Hegseth if 200 national guards could be withdrawn and redeployed as California was entering into peak wildfire season.

== Impact ==
=== Cost ===
At a June 10 press conference, it was announced by Los Angeles officials that at least 23 businesses had been looted overnight, with losses and damages estimated in the millions.

The Pentagon estimated the total deployment of 4,000 National Guard and 700 Marines would last 60 days and cost approximately $134 million.

=== Detention of foreign nationals ===
==== Indonesia ====
On June 10, the Ministry of Foreign Affairs announced that the Indonesian consulate in Los Angeles has obtained information concerning the ICE detention of two Indonesian citizens and is coordinating with local authorities for access to consular assistance. The identities of the two Indonesian citizens are (initials) ESS, a 53-year-old woman, and Chrissahdah Tooy, a 48-year-old man. ESS was arrested due to her illegal immigrant status, and Tooy because he had a record of drug violations and entered the US illegally.

==== Mexico ====
Carlos González Gutiérrez, the consul general of Mexico in Los Angeles, announced that at least 11 Mexican nationals were arrested by June 7, and that they would be offered legal services. The following day, Mexican president Claudia Sheinbaum confirmed that 35 Mexican nationals had been arrested, and commented in a press conference that "[t]hey are not criminals". On June 9, Sheinbaum urged U.S. authorities to respect due process and human rights.

=== Solidarity protests in other cities ===
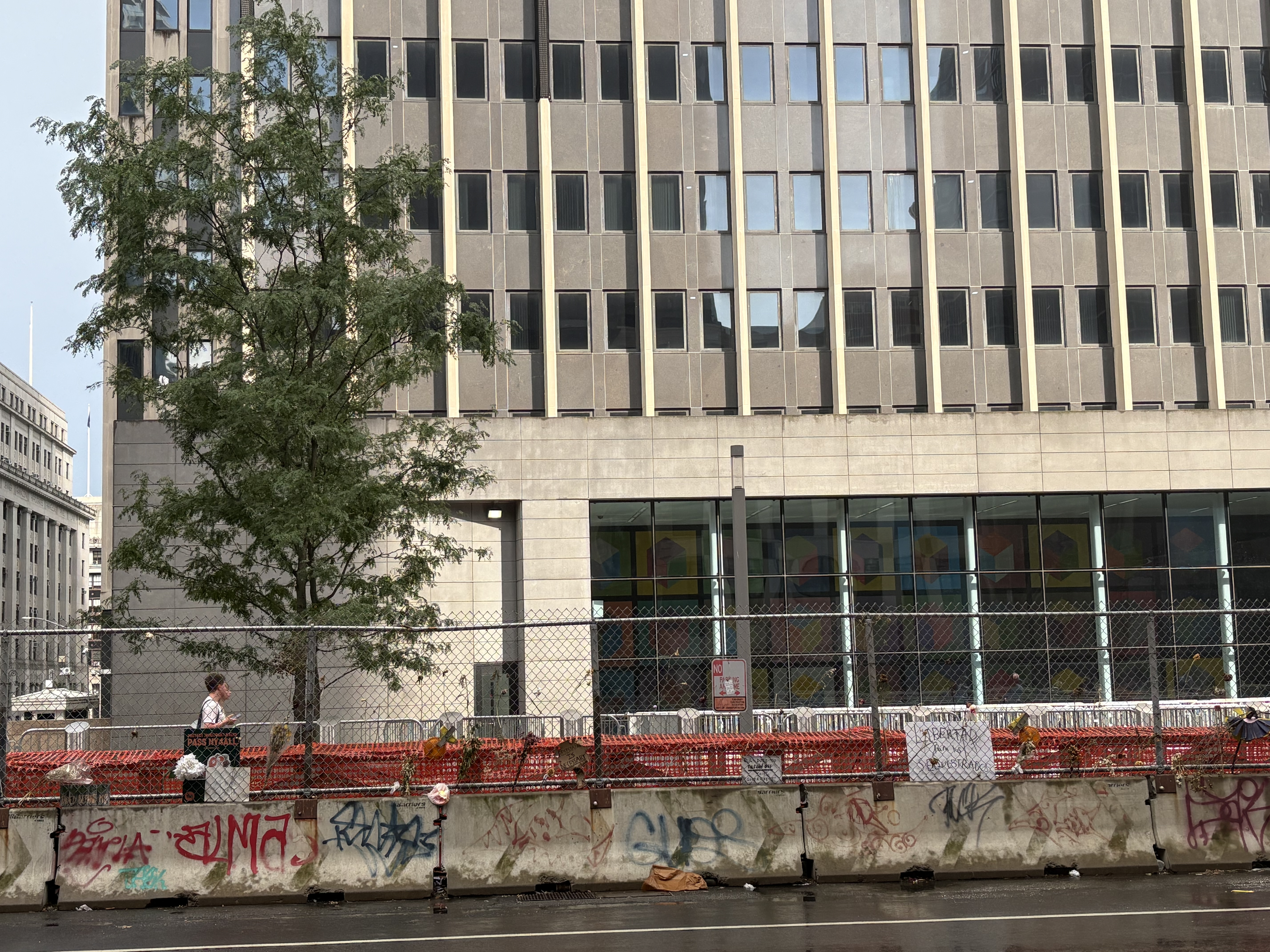
Graffiti and signs on concrete barriers blocking the Jacob K. Javits Federal Building after anti-ICE protests

On June 8, a solidarity protest outside the ICE office in San Francisco occurred. The protest ended with police arresting 148 people. Two police officers were injured during the protests and several buildings and vehicles were damaged.

On June 9 in New York City, another solidarity protest occurred outside of the Jacob K. Javits Federal Building, ending with police taking multiple people into custody. Two dozen more were arrested while protesting at Trump Tower. Later, hundreds of protesters gathered in the streets of New York while holding signs saying "ICE out of New York City". In Santa Ana, several people were arrested during protests in front of the Santa Ana Federal Building. Police in multiple cities used tear gas to disperse protesters, including in Austin, Texas, and Doraville, Georgia.

At a protest in Embry Hills, a suburb of Atlanta, independent journalist and Salvadoran national Mario Guevara was arrested by local police. ICE then moved to detain Guevara, who has a valid work permit and is in the process of applying for permanent resident status.

Solidarity protests were also held in other cities, including Boston, Portland, Maine, Salt Lake City, Hartford, Tampa, Sacramento, Dallas, San Antonio, Phoenix, Atlanta, Seattle, Philadelphia, Detroit, Washington, D.C., Baltimore, Chicago, Las Vegas, Louisville, Raleigh, Denver, Jacksonville, Omaha, and Kansas City.

On June 10, Texas governor Greg Abbott deployed Texas National Guard troops to San Antonio and other locations across the state ahead of planned protests the next day.

=== Police violence against journalists ===
The Associated Press reported that by June 10, over two dozen journalists had been arrested or "roughed up" by law enforcement, leading press freedom groups to question whether or not they were being deliberately targeted. Reporters Without Borders reported 35 attacks on journalists, of which 30 were from law enforcement. The Committee to Protect Journalists, the First Amendment Coalition, and Freedom of the Press Foundation expressed concern in a letter to DHS Secretary Kristi Noem that "federal officers appear to have deliberately targeted journalists who were doing nothing more than their job covering the news." The secretary of the Los Angeles Press Club reported that the organization had documented more than 30 incidents where police actions affected reporters, photographers, and other media professionals, ranging from searching their materials and bags to firing tear gas and rubber bullets, and said the club was aware of 20 injuries to journalists during the protests, including at least five requiring medical attention.

Australian journalists

On June 8, Lauren Tomasi, a reporter for Australia's Nine News, was struck on the leg by a rubber bullet while reporting on the protests outside the Metropolitan Detention Center in downtown Los Angeles, where police were beginning to disperse the protesters. Australian Prime Minister Anthony Albanese called the shooting "targeted" and said he had raised the issue with the Trump administration. The Australian Department of Foreign Affairs and Trade released a statement declaring that "all journalists should be able to do their work safely". Albanese also described the footage of the reporter being shot by an officer as "horrific" and said he intended to raise the issue with the Trump administration over the incident. Albanese and senator Matt Canavan both said Tomasi's shooting appeared targeted, with Canavan adding he had only seen part of the footage and was "loth to jump to conclusions".

That same day, while covering the protests, crew members from the Australian Broadcasting Corporation were struck by tear gas. On June 10, the same crew were struck by pepper pellets, and a cameraman from Channel Nine was shot at.

Chinese journalists

On June 8, while covering protests in downtown Los Angeles, a Xinhua News Agency reporter was hit twice by tear gas canisters, while a photojournalist was struck in the left leg by rubber bullets, resulting in a bruised and swollen wound.

South Korean journalists

SBS reported on June 11 that one of their reporters was hit by police-fired rubber bullets during a protest.

United Kingdom journalists

On June 7, British reporter and photographer Nick Stern was shot with a less-than-lethal 3-inch (75 mm) projectile. He suffered an open wound and underwent emergency surgery on June 8. His injuries will require physical therapy.

On June 9, an ITV presenter for the program Good Morning Britain was shot with a rubber bullet during a broadcast segment.

United States journalists

On June 7, World Socialist Web Site reporters reportedly sustained injuries while documenting the protests, including a reporter who was shot in the back with a rubber bullet by a US immigration officer. That same day, a reporter with the Southern California News Group reported that she had been shot by officers with pepper ball bullets.

On June 8, a reporter for The New York Times was shot at but was not seriously injured. On June 9, Toby Canham, a news photographer with the New York Post was recording California Highway Patrol officers stationed under a freeway to document the protests and response. While filming, one of the California Highway Patrol officers reportedly turned their weapon towards the gathered reporters and shot, striking Canham in the forehead with a rubber bullet.

On June 10, crime reporter Ryanne Mena and videographer Sean Beckner-Carmitchel for the Los Angeles Daily News were shot by non-lethal rounds.

== Analysis ==
Reuters reported that the protests were the strongest domestic backlash to Trump since he took office in January, and became a focal point in a national debate over immigration, protest, the use of federal force in domestic affairs, the boundaries of presidential power, and freedom of speech and assembly. It also reported the use of masks and balaclavas by ICE agents raised concerns over a lack of accountability and intimidation tactics. While some violence occurred, most of the protests were peaceful. Trump's federalization of the National Guard without the cooperation of the state's governor was the first time such an action was done since the Selma to Montgomery marches in 1965.

The Trump administration used social media to highlight the most violent clashes between protesters and federal authorities, although most remained peaceful. The Mexican flag was used as a symbol by some protestors, which the administration portrayed as evidencing a "foreign invasion". Fake images, misinformation, and conspiracy theories spread quickly on social media during the protests, with most falsely suggesting the entire city was engulfed in violence, expressing outrage towards immigrants and Democrats, and praising Trump.

The New York Times described the administration as seeking confrontation with Governor Newsom in "a showdown with a top political rival in a deep blue state over an issue core to his political agenda", which Reuters described as allowing Trump to "tout his hardline immigration policies while claiming California was helpless to stop the violence without his intervention". The Times stated that Democrats were taking a cautious approach to the protests and recognizing Republicans' "skillful" ability "to cast liberal lawmakers as tolerant of lawlessness", and warning protestors not to play into Trump's hands. Axios described Trump using the protests to push Republicans to back his One Big Beautiful Bill Act in Congress and distract from coverage of it and his recent feud with Elon Musk. It also described it as providing "red meat" to his political base, with notable MAGA activists increasingly calling for further military deployment to arrest Democrats and legal residents who opposed his policies.

=== Comparison to other incidents ===
==== 1992 Los Angeles riots ====
Scholars described the protests as far different and bearing "little if any comparison" to the 1992 Los Angeles riots, with many noting that the current protests were largely peaceful, not directed at residents, had done comparatively little damage to houses or businesses, and were not widespread but contained to a five-block stretch of Downtown LA.

On June 10, the Korean American Federation of Los Angeles repudiated a tweet by Donald Trump Jr. in which he wrote "Make Rooftop Koreans Great Again!" along with a photo of a man on a rooftop in a reference to the 1992 Los Angeles riots, during which Korean Americans shot at looters who attacked their shops. The Federation called for such event to not be politically exploited for any purpose beyond saying the United States Immigration and Customs Enforcement raids lacked due process of law. Hyungwon Kang, the photojournalist who took the picture tweeted by Trump Jr., said that his photo was taken out of context by him and that he was in contact with a lawyer to take legal action after Trump Jr. did not answer his request to remove it from his account.

==== January 6 Capitol attack ====
While speaking with reporters, Attorney General Pam Bondi rejected the idea that Trump's pardon of January 6 United States Capitol attack defendants created a double standard with the Trump administration's more aggressive response to the violence and protests in Los Angeles. Governor Newsom responded that Trump was inconsistent in his response and only opposed lawlessness and violence as long as it benefited him.

=== Use of the military ===
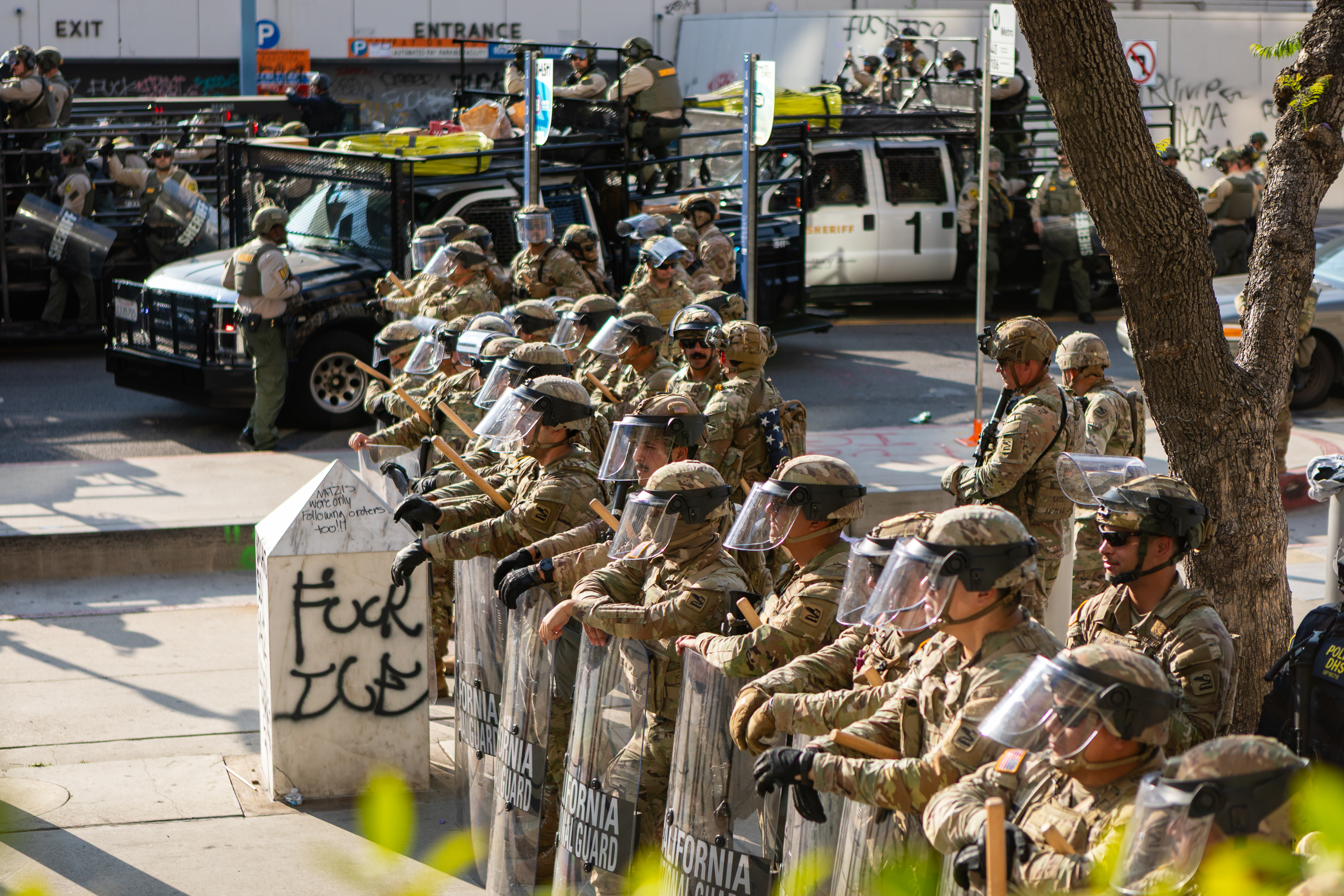
California National Guardsmen in Los Angeles on June 12

The New York Times described the federalization and deployment of the California National Guard as Trump "pushing the boundaries of presidential authority and stoking criticism that he is inflaming the situation for political gain" by portraying the events as an "existential threat to the country", and embracing the rhetoric of a nation under siege with Trump saying he needed to "liberate Los Angeles" from a "migrant invasion". Other martial language included referring to protestors as "insurrectionists" and "violent insurrectionist mobs", that they threatened US sovereignty, that he needed to prevent LA from "burning to the ground", and that he would not allow "an American city to be invaded and conquered by a foreign enemy". Communications experts described the language as militaristic, hyperbolic, inflammatory, and designed to discourage dissent.

The Economist described the response as only barely concerned with restoring order, and stated its purpose was to "create confrontation" and fuel a "cycle of protest, violence and repression" to the administration's benefit. Politico described Trump's response as motivated by attempting to avoid a repeat of the George Floyd protests when he was advised against deploying the military, as acting in his belief of a governing mandate by voters that fueled his 2024 election victory, and serving as a warning to other city and state leaders. Internal military communications expressed concerns of "far-reaching social, political and operational" impacts of the deployment, and that use of military forces posed "extremely high" risk to civilians, troops, and the military's reputation.

=== Legality of National Guard and military deployment ===
The New York Times reported that multiple legal scholars described Trump's legal rationale for deploying the National Guard as not authorized by his cited statutes, and that he instead appeared to be declaring dubious emergencies to amass executive power. Politico described Trump's stated legal rationale as "a flimsy and even contrived basis for such a rare and dramatic step" according to several legal scholars and potentially fueling a cycle of increasing unrest.

Analysts stated it was unclear under what authority Trump had deployed active-duty Marines to LA, and The Associated Press reported the Pentagon was "scrambling" to create rules of engagement for Marines who would be armed with their standard service weapons. Law professor Steve Vladeck questioned the legality of actions undertaken by Defense Secretary Pete Hegseth during the response, which Vladeck believed exceed the limited proclamation by President Trump to protect property and personnel.

The Military Times reported that the military deployments raised significant legal and political concerns by experts and former defense officials, who noted its official orders to protect federal property placed the military in an "awkward and potentially hazardous mission" that "risks making the units look as though they are conducting law enforcement" and dragging it into partisan politics. It further described Trump's executive order to deploy the military in cities where protests were "likely to occur" as broad and potentially allowing forces to operate in other cities. Former Major General Paul Eaton described the deployment as an example of politicization of the military and a possible prelude to use of the Insurrection Act.

Military.com reported that, as of June 11, California National Guard units deployed to Los Angeles had not received formal activation orders, and were ineligible for pay or health benefits.

==== Newsom v. Trump ====
Governor Newsom announced early in the morning of June 9 that his office intended to sue the Trump administration for deploying the National Guard without consulting with his office, calling it "illegal and immoral". California attorney general Rob Bonta filed the suit later the same day in the District Court for the Northern District of California, where it was assigned to Judge Charles Breyer, the brother of former Supreme Court justice Stephen Breyer. The next day, Bonta filed an emergency request for a temporary restraining order, asserting that the federalization of the National Guard harms the state's sovereignty, draws on state resources, and "escalates tensions and promotes (rather than quells) civil unrest". Breyer declined Bonta's request and granted the Trump administration's request for more time to respond to the governor's filing. The administration filed its opposition on June 11, calling the suit a "crass political stunt" and arguing that Trump's decision is not reviewable by the courts. On June 12, Breyer granted California's motion for a temporary restraining order, enjoining the federal deployment and restoring control of the Guard to Newsom pending further hearings. He said Trump did not have statutory authority to deploy the Guard and was violating the Tenth Amendment to the U.S. Constitution. Later that day before Breyer's ruling took effect, the 9th U.S. Circuit Court of Appeals paused it and scheduled a hearing for June 17.

After a three-day bench trial, Breyer ruled on September 2, 2025, that the Trump administration had violated the Posse Comitatus Act and ordered the administration not to use National Guard or military troops for civilian law enforcement in California. Breyer described the administration's actions and rhetoric of further domestic military deployments as an apparent attempt at "creating a national police force with the President as its chief" and described the rationale for deployment as contrived, writing that "There was no rebellion, nor was civilian law enforcement unable to respond to the protests and enforce the law". Breyer issued an injunction covering all of California, blocking the use of the National Guard, though stayed the injunction until September 12 to give time for the government to appeal.

The government appealed the ruling on September 3.

On December 31, 2025, following more court loses, Trump would end the National Guard deployment in Los Angeles.

=== Vasquez Perdomo v. Noem ===
Pedro Vasquez Perdomo v. Kristi Noem
- Court: Central District of California
- Started: 2025
- Docket nos.: 2:25-cv-05605 (CDCA); 25-4312 (9th Cir.)

Case history
- Appealed to: Ninth Circuit
- Subsequent action: district ruling stayed by Supreme Court via shadow docket

On July 2, 2025, the ACLU filed a lawsuit in federal court against the Trump administration over the ongoing ICE raids in Los Angeles, Vasquez Perdomo v. Noem. The lawsuit was filed on behalf of five Los Angeles County residents—Pedro Vasquez Perdomo, Carlos Alexander Osorto, Isaac Villegas Molina, Jorge Hernandez Viramontes, and Jason Brian Gavidia—who had been stopped and detained by ICE agents in June. Joining the suit in favor of Vasquez Perdomo are multiple immigration advocacy groups, Los Angeles County, and the cities of Los Angeles, Pasadena, Santa Monica, Culver City, Pico Rivera, Montebello, Monterey Park, and West Hollywood. The suit claims that the Trump administration is engaging in unconstitutional roundups and raids without reasonable suspicion or probable cause based on perceived ethnicity, only arresting Hispanic individuals at places of work that predominantly hire Hispanic people, using disproportionate force in carrying immigration enforcement activities, and confining individuals without access to their attorneys.

U.S. District Judge Maame Ewusi-Mensah Frimpong concluded on July 11, 2025 that those who brought the suit were likely to prove "the federal government is indeed conducting roving patrols without reasonable suspicion and denying access to lawyers". The judge ordered the Trump administration to stop immigration arrests without probable cause, alleging that it targeted California residents based on race, language and place of work. DHS was issued a temporary restraining order (TRO) effective immediately. The White House said the DOJ planned to appeal.

The United States Court of Appeals for the Ninth Circuit heard arguments on appeal on July 28, 2025 by the DOJ regarding the issued TRO. Hearing the government's profile of roving detentive stops, the three-judge panel questioned the government's reasonable suspicion legal requirement for arrests. The district judge panel issued the appeal ruling on August 1, stating that the broad profile does not supply the reasonable suspicion required to justify a detentive stop: "Reasonable suspicion cannot be based on 'generalizations'" and "the four enumerated factors at issue—apparent race or ethnicity, speaking Spanish or speaking English with an accent, particular location, and type of work, even when considered together— describe only a broad profile and 'do not demonstrate reasonable suspicion for any particular stop'". The TRO would therefore remain in place.

The judges also questioned the "quota" of 3,000 ICE arrests per day policy as it affects roving raids. The DOJ lawyers verified that no such official directive was issued, but that it was verbally issued by Deputy White House Chief of Staff Stephen Miller through media interviews. The ACLU and its plaintiffs filed a motion for an injunction with the district court; it is now scheduled for September 24.

On August 7, 2025 Solicitor General D. John Sauer filed an application of review with the United States Supreme Court to immediately halt judge Frimpong's TRO. The Southern California cities of Long Beach, Pomona, South Gate, Lynwood, Huntington Park, Paramount, Bell Gardens, Beverly Hills, Anaheim, Santa Ana, Santa Barbara, Carpinteria and Oxnard joined LA in the lawsuit.

On September 3, 2025 NBC News reported that the administration was violating the court order per immigrant advocates and local officials, and the ACLU submitted a new motion asking Frimpong to order additional evidence from the federal government "in light of apparent violations" of her order. Residents also filed additional individual lawsuits following continued raids.

On September 7, 2025, the Supreme Court ruled 6–3 in the solicitor generals appeal for a stay, lifting the TRO restrictions. In a concurring opinion, Justice Brett Kavanaugh argued that while apparent ethnicity alone cannot justify a stop, it may count as a relevant factor along with others when assessing reasonable suspicion under the Fourth Amendment. Detentions based on the combination of such factors, as described in that opinion, including detentions of US citizens and legal residents, have since been referred to as "Kavanaugh stops". The case continues through the federal court. In a separate case, Trump v. Illinois, where the state challenged the use of the National Guard as part of Operation Midway Blitz, the Supreme Court issued an order in December 2025 that upheld a lower court's ruling blocking the use of the National Guard. In this order, Kavanaugh added a concurring statement that took to clarify his language from the earlier order in Vasquez Perdomo, writing that federal officers "must not make interior immigration stops or arrests based on race or ethnicity". Some legal analysts said that Kavanaugh used the statement to try to corral highly controversial immigration enforcement actions that had occurred since the Vasquez Perdomo order.

=== Charges against protestors ===
By July 23, federal prosecutors brought 38 felony cases against protestors but secured only seven indictments, with many being dismissed or reduced to misdemeanor charges. By July 28, federal prosecutors had charged 26 protestors with assaulting or impeding federal law enforcement. Prosecutors were forced to drop at least eight felonies after US immigration officers made false and misleading testimony against protestors they had arrested, along with three others shortly afterwards. Out of nine assault and impeding cases brought forwards and promoted by Attorney General Pam Bondi, prosecutors dismissed seven soon after unveiling the charges. Reports that led to the arrest and prosecution of five demonstrators were dropped after DHS agents made false statements about the sequence of events and misrepresented incidents captured on video. One indictment named the wrong defendant. 18 additional cases had not been dismissed by July 28, in three of which protestors took plea deals. In at least six of the felony dismissals, the justice department refiled lower-level misdemeanors against the defendants. The Los Angeles Times reported that Trump-appointed US attorney for southern California, Bill Essayli, struggled to secure convictions at grand juries. It said Essayli's low number of indictments raised concerns among legal experts over the strength of the cases he was filing, and that he was stretching legal limits to "serve as President Trump's attack dog in L.A."

== Responses ==
=== California ===
==== Local ====
Los Angeles mayor Karen Bass criticized the raids, stating that "[a]s Mayor of a proud city of immigrants, who contribute to our city in so many ways, I am deeply angered by what has taken place. These tactics sow terror in our communities and disrupt basic principles of safety in our city", later adding that "[w]e will not stand for this." On June 7, she declared that "Everyone has the right to peacefully protest, but ... violence and destruction are unacceptable, and those responsible will be held accountable." Bass also mentioned that Los Angeles was used as a "test case" by the federal government. On June 11, Bass held a press conference flanked by over 30 elected officials from surrounding municipalities.

The Los Angeles County Sheriff's Department denied involvement in the raids. The Los Angeles Police Department also denied involvement in civil immigration enforcement.

Los Angeles FC fans held a silent protest at BMO Stadium for 90 minutes and displayed tifos criticizing the ICE raids during their June 8 game against Sporting Kansas City. LA Galaxy fans stated that they would not travel to see the team on the road at PayPal Park against the San Jose Earthquakes for their game on June 28 and cancelled viewing parties for their games on June 14 and 25 against St. Louis City SC and the Colorado Rapids respectively.

Los Angeles Metro stated that they would still run the Dodger Stadium express from Union Station for the June 13, 14, and 15 games between the Los Angeles Dodgers and San Francisco Giants despite the curfew and that fans returning from the game would not be subject to the curfew provided that they show proof of attendance such as their tickets.

The National Hockey League stated that they were monitoring the situation in anticipation of the 2025 NHL entry draft, which is set to take place at the Peacock Theater at L.A. Live on June 27 and 28.

CONCACAF stated that they were also monitoring the situation in anticipation of the 2025 CONCACAF Gold Cup, where games are set to be played at SoFi Stadium and Dignity Health Sports Park. Concerns were also raised about the 2025 FIFA Club World Cup games set to be played at the Rose Bowl.

==== State ====
Newsom's address to Californians and the nation on June 10

California Governor Gavin Newsom condemned David Huerta's detention. Representatives Jimmy Gomez, Luz Rivas, Norma Torres, and Lou Correa visited the detention center where the detained were held; Gomez alleged that they "didn't have access to food and water on a schedule" nor "access to their medicines".

In a televised speech Newsom later criticized President Trump's decision to mobilize the California National Guard, saying that it was "purposefully inflammatory" and that it would "only escalate tensions"; he also urged protesters to "never use violence" and to "speak out peacefully". In response to Trump's authorization of an additional 2,000 National Guardsmen to be sent Los Angeles, Newsom described the move as "reckless" and "disrespectful to our troops". According to The New York Times, California Democrats had privately expressed concern that Trump would federalize the state's national guard, but acknowledged that their legal options would be limited. The Financial Times wrote that the order to deploy National Guardsmen would "intensify tensions between the Trump administration and California". California sued the Trump administration over the decision to bypass the governor in nationalizing the national guard.

Senators Adam Schiff and Alex Padilla condemned the mobilization of the National Guard to Los Angeles. Padilla called the mobilization "a completely inappropriate and misguided mission", while Schiff described it as "unprecedented" and stated that the action "is designed to inflame tensions, sow chaos, and escalate the situation".

On June 10, at 6:30 p.m. PDT, Newsom delivered a primetime televised address to California and the nation to criticize Trump for sending National Guard and Marines to Los Angeles, calling it an assault on democracy.

=== National ===
==== Trump administration ====
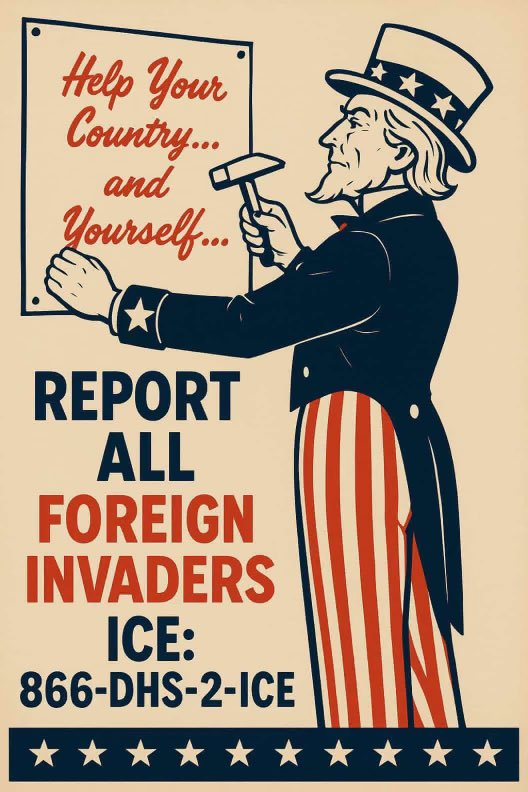
An anti-immigrant World War II-style propaganda poster posted by Homeland Security on X on June 11, 2025, telling readers to report "foreign invaders" to ICE during the Los Angeles protests

The Trump administration urged Democrats to condemn the protests and accused "the left" of having incited the protests; the DHS accused Karen Bass and Gavin Newsom of contributing to alleged violence. Donald Trump later praised the National Guard. In a speech at Fort Bragg commemorating the 250th anniversary of the United States Army, Trump described the protesters as both "animals" and "a foreign enemy", stating that "we will liberate Los Angeles and make it free, clean, and safe again." Trump posted on social media that protestors who spit at police will get "hit" and that "disrespect will not be tolerated". US Vice President JD Vance condemned the protests, calling the protesters "insurrectionists" and "far-left rioters", and called for "decisive leadership". He later took aim at Newsom, tweeting at him to "do your job". House Speaker Mike Johnson said that Newsom should be "tarred and feathered".

Secretary of Homeland Security Kristi Noem warned that protesters would be prosecuted. Federal Bureau of Investigation (FBI) director Kash Patel responded to Bass's tweet vowing to "not stand for this" with, "We will". Todd Lyons, the acting Director of Immigration and Customs Enforcement, criticized the Los Angeles Police Department for purportedly not responding to the protests for over two hours. Dan Bongino, the deputy director of the FBI, stated that they would investigate the protests. Stephen Miller, the White House Deputy Chief of Staff for Policy and the Homeland Security Advisor to the President, tweeted, "Deport the invaders, or surrender to insurrection." Miller additionally claimed that if the protests continued, the United States would cease to exist. According to The Wall Street Journal, Miller coordinated the federal government response to the protests, giving orders to agencies including the Department of Defense.

On June 5, Administrator of the Small Business Administration Kelly Loeffler announced the relocation of the SBA's regional office in Los Angeles on X, citing the city "openly refusing to cooperate with ICE" efforts. Two days prior, the House of Representatives had passed a bill requiring the SBA to relocate all offices from sanctuary cities, including Los Angeles.

==== Politicians ====
Vermont Senator Bernie Sanders denounced the Trump administration as moving the United States rapidly into the realm of authoritarianism. Rhode Island Senator Jack Reed criticized Trump's decision to send 700 Marines to Los Angeles as an attempt to "us[e] the military as a political weapon". Delaware Senator Chris Coons also criticized the deployment of U.S. Marines, stating, "It is unfortunate ... to mobilize U.S. Marines who are trained for the Pacific, not for the streets of Los Angeles." Both Coons and Connecticut Senator Chris Murphy accused the Trump administration of using the protests as a distraction from other matters, such as the One Big Beautiful Bill Act.

New York Representative Dan Goldman, Mississippi Representative Bennie Thompson, and former U.S. Capitol Police officer Harry Dunn, the latter of whom was present during the January 6 Capitol attack in 2021, accused the Trump administration of hypocrisy, perceiving a disparity between Trump's responses to the Capitol attack and the Los Angeles protests. Goldman stated, "Donald Trump pardoned 1,500 cop-beaters and insurrectionists, defied court orders, and weaponized prosecutions against his political opponents, yet he now pretends to care about 'law and order' when Americans protest his efforts to deport non-violent, non-criminal immigrants without due process."

Conversely, Democratic Senator John Fetterman accused the Democratic Party of not condemning violence within the protests, writing, "My party loses the moral high ground when we refuse to condemn setting cars on fire, destroying buildings, and assaulting law enforcement." Kentucky Senator Rand Paul criticized the Democratic Party's response to the protests as "appalling", stating, "You got a city on fire. You got people marching with foreign flags, people marching with a Mexican flag in L.A., resisting federal law, interfering with federal law. You have the governor and the mayor, both Democrats, saying they will interfere and will not uphold federal law." Arkansas Senator Tom Cotton called for "an overwhelming show of force to end the riots" in an op-ed in The Wall Street Journal. Both Cotton and Florida Senator Rick Scott blamed Democrats for the protests. Missouri senator Josh Hawley, without evidence, accused CHIRLA and Unión del Barrio of "aiding and abetting criminal conduct" by "bankrolling civil unrest".

==== Organizations ====
After protesters vandalized and set five Waymo self-driving cars alight on June 8, the company responded by shutting down service to downtown Los Angeles and limiting service in San Francisco.

The Party for Socialism and Liberation (PSL) and the Los Angeles chapter of the Democratic Socialists of America (DSA) declared their support for the protestors. PSL promoted and organized protests on June 8, while DSA promoted protests for June 9 and 10. Revolutionary Communists of America members also attended the protests.

Satirical news website The Onion published articles parodying the local and federal government responses to the protests. Following Trump's advocacy for Governor Newsom's arrest on June 9, The Onion published "ICE Releases Gavin Newsom Beheading Video", satirizing Islamic State beheadings. Another article, "Protesters Urged Not To Give Trump Administration Pretext For What It Already Doing", followed Mayor Bass' June 11 address.

==== Polling ====
A YouGov poll of 4,200 U.S. adults conducted on June 9 found that 36% approved of the protests, while 45% disapproved, and 19% were unsure. The same poll found that 34% approved of Trump's deployment of U.S. Marines to the area, while 47% disapproved, and that 38% approved of his deployment of the National Guard, while 45% disapproved.

=== International ===
The governments or consulates of Australia, Canada, China, the Philippines, Indonesia, Japan, and the United Kingdom have issued advisories to their citizens in Los Angeles in response to the protests. The government of Hong Kong also warned citizens travelling to the United States to practice safety precautions amid ongoing protests.

The Iranian government used the protests to mock the Trump administration, with an account affiliated with the Islamic Republic of Iran Armed Forces posting an image of protestors carrying Mexican flags, captioned "Make Mexico Great Again!". The Tehran Times published a headline reading "Make America Quashed Again", parodying the Trump slogan "Make America Great Again".

== See also ==
- 2007 MacArthur Park rallies – Immigration policy protests in Los Angeles, California, US
- List of incidents of civil unrest in the United States – List of incidents from 1783 to the present
- Operation Metro Surge – US immigration enforcement operation in Minnesota
- Watts riots – 1965 riots in Los Angeles, United States
- Zoot Suit Riots – 1943 anti-Latino race riot by US servicemen in Los Angeles
