= Angelica Salas =

American immigration activist

- Born: Durango, Mexico
- Citizenship: American
- Education: Occidental College
- Occupation: Executive director
- Known for: Immigrant rights activism

Angelica Salas is an American immigration activist and the executive director of the Coalition for Humane Immigrant Rights of Los Angeles. Born in Mexico, she immigrated to the United States as a child and works to support immigrant's rights out of Los Angeles.

== Early life and education ==
Salas was born in Durango, Mexico. She came to the United States when she was 5 and grew up in Pasadena, California. Salas cites how some of her family members were left out of the Immigration Reform and Control Act of 1986, which was passed under the Reagan administration She graduated from Pasadena High School.

Salas graduated from Occidental College with degrees in history and sociology in 1993. She became a US citizen in 2008.

== Career ==
Salas joined the Coalition for Humane Immigrant Rights of Los Angeles (CHIRLA) in 1995. She became the executive director in 1999. She increased outreach to immigrant workers, helping to establish education programs for day laborers and working to get more people involved with CHIRLA's advocacy campaigns. During her tenure as executive directory, CHIRLA also helped pass legislation allowing immigrants the ability to obtain California driver's licenses, the California Values Act, and California's Assembly Bill 540, which allows immigrants to pay the same rate for college tuition as state residents. For immigrants arriving in Los Angeles, Salas says about 80% of new arrivals are quickly reunited with friends and family, and CHIRLA aims to help them settle quickly.

In response to the June 2025 Los Angeles protests, Missouri senator Josh Hawley blamed Salas for the civil unrest. Salas responded by suggesting the Trump administration is attacking groups that support immigrants: "This is trying to take away the spotlight from the pain and suffering that this administration is causing."

Salas is a founding member of the Fair Immigration Reform Movement and National Partnership for New Americans coalitions. She views recruitment and training of new activists as one of the primary goals of her work.

== Awards and honors ==
- In 2007, Salas was given an honorary doctorate degree from her alma mater, Occidental College
- In 2018, Salas was chosen by the National Women's History Project as one of its honorees for Women's History Month
