= Pat Foote =

American Army officer (1930–2025)

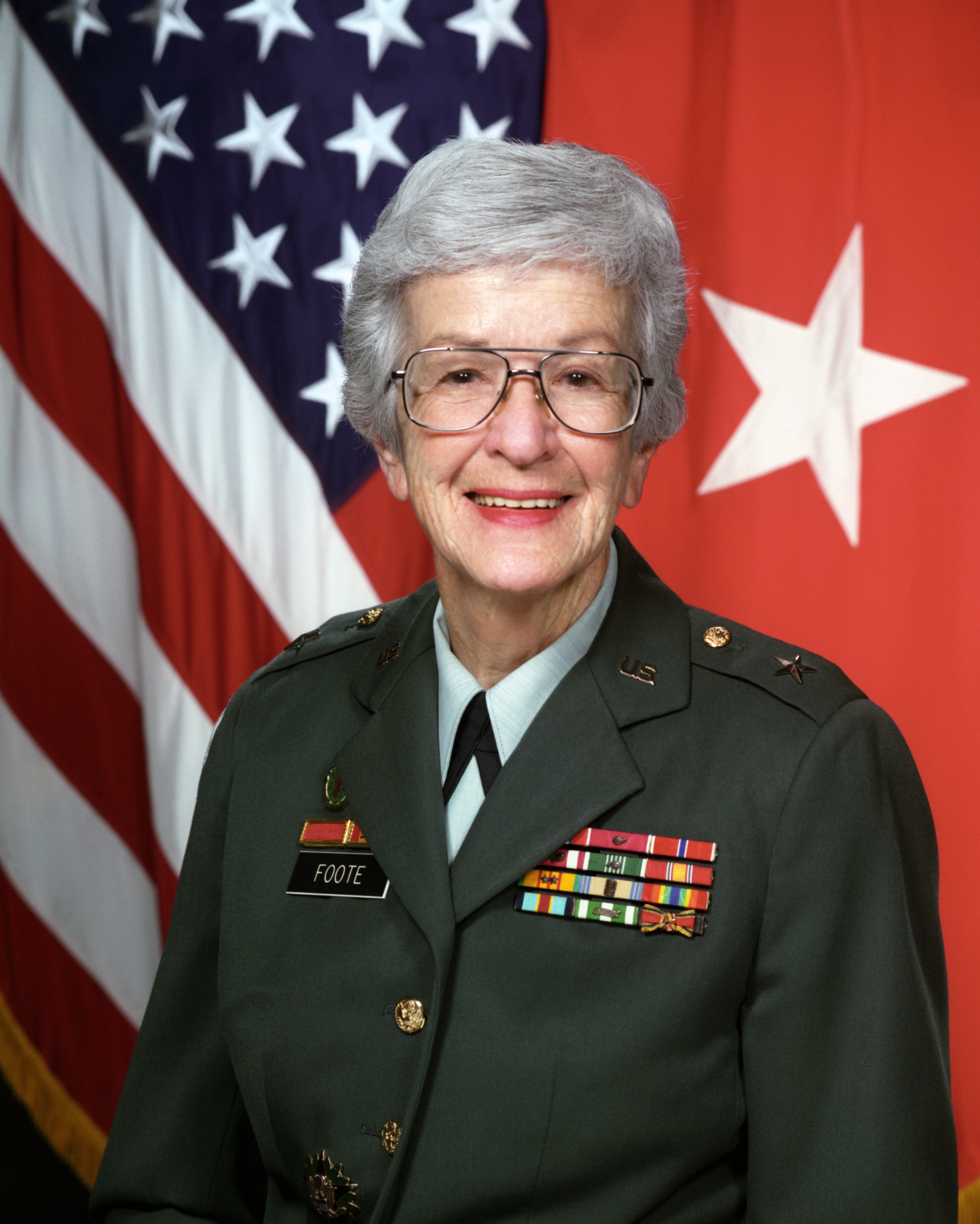
- Born: May 19, 1930; Durham, North Carolina, U.S.
- Died: August 10, 2025 (aged 95); Duluth, Minnesota, U.S.
- Education: Wake Forest University (BA); Shippensburg University of Pennsylvania (MS)
- Military career
- Allegiance: United States
- Branch: United States Army
- Service years: 1959–1989; 1996–1997
- Rank: Brigadier General
- Commands: Fort Belvoir; 42d Military Police Group; 2d Basic Training Battalion
- Conflicts: Vietnam War
- Awards: Army Distinguished Service Medal; Legion of Merit (2); Bronze Star Medal

Evelyn Patricia Foote (May 19, 1930 – August 10, 2025) was a United States Army officer. She served from 1959 to 1989, rising to the rank of brigadier general in 1986, and held many firsts for women in the United States Army.

== Early life and education ==
Pat Foote was born in Durham, North Carolina, on May 19, 1930. Her parents, Evelyn Sevina Womack Foote and Henry Alexander Foote senior, both worked for the American Tobacco Company while Foote was a child. In 1945, the Foote family moved to Washington, D.C., and Pat Foote graduated from Central High School in 1947. She attended Wake Forest University, earning a Bachelor of Arts in sociology in 1953. Foote also held a Master of Science in Public Administration and Government from Shippensburg University, and an Honorary Doctor of Law from Wake Forest University. She was also a 1980 graduate of the Executive Program of the University of Virginia and a 1985 graduate of the Center for Creative Leadership. Her military education included completion of the Women's Army Corps Officer Basic Course, the Adjutant General Corps Officer Advanced Course, the United States Army Command and General Staff College, and the Army War College.

== Military career ==
Foote held a variety of command and staff positions, culminating in her assignment as Commanding General of Fort Belvoir, Virginia. Immediately prior, she was Deputy Inspector General (Inspections), Department of the Army. Other key assignments include command of the 2d Basic Training Battalion, United States Army Military Police School and Training Center, Fort McClellan, Alabama; service as Director of Personnel Management Systems, Department of Command and Management, the United States Army War College, Carlisle Barracks, Pennsylvania; and Commander, 42d Military Police Group, United States Army, Europe and Seventh United States Army.

In other key assignments, Foote served with the Information Office at Headquarters, United States Army, Vietnam in 1967 and upon return to the United States, assumed the duties of Executive Officer, Women's Army Corps Branch with the Officer Personnel Directorate, Office of Personnel Operations. She was the Plans and Programs Officer with the Office of the Director, Women's Army Corps, during the transition to the all-volunteer force and the early years of the greatly increased utilization of women within the army. Following this, she served as the final WAC Staff Adviser to the Commanding General of the United States Army Forces Command and as Executive Officer of that command's Human Resources Directorate.

== Achievements, awards and decorations ==
Foote had many notable achievements during her career. She became the first female public relations officer in Vietnam in 1967. In 1979 she became the first female faculty member of the United States Army War School. Foote was also the first female brigade commander in Europe, and became the first female inspector general in the Army in 1986. When Foote was promoted to brigadier general in 1986, she became one of only four female generals in the United States Army at that time. She was also the first female commander of Fort Belvoir, Virginia.

Foote's awards and decorations included the Army Distinguished Service Medal, the Legion of Merit with Oak Leaf Cluster, the Bronze Star Medal, the Meritorious Service Medal with two Oak Leaf Clusters, the Army Commendation Medal with Oak Leaf Cluster, and the Army General Staff Identification Badge. The German government awarded her the Bundesverdienstkreuz, Erste Klasse, for her service as Command of the 42 Military Police Group, 1983 to 1985.

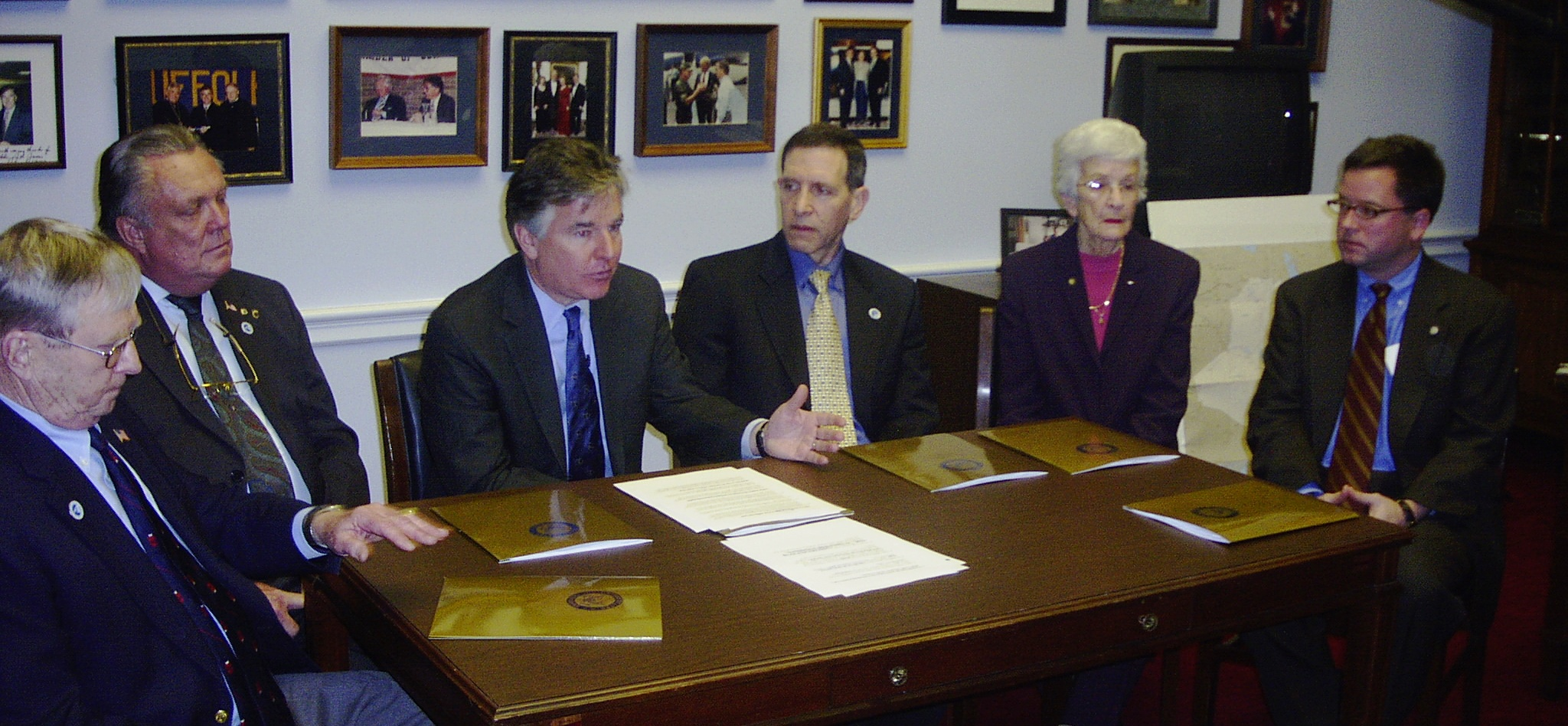
US Rep. Marty Meehan (3rd from left) is joined in a 2005 photo by BG Pat Foote (2nd from right) and other retired flag officers supporting the repeal of DADT.

== Retirement and recall ==
Foote retired from active duty on September 1, 1989. In December 1996, she was recalled to active duty to serve as Vice Chair of the Secretary of the Army's Senior Review Panel on Sexual Harassment.

On October 1, 1997, Foote returned to retired status and served as a Consultant to the Office of the Secretary of the Army through July 1998, briefing military leaders and various organizations concerning the Senior Review Panel's report, its findings and its recommendations. From 1998 to 2007, she served as president of the Alliance for National Defense, a non-profit organization that supports women in the military. She remained an active spokesperson for the Army and other organizations concerning the role of women in the military services.

From 1994 to 2001 and again from 2010 to 2012, Foote served on the American Battle Monuments Commission.

Foote died on August 10, 2025, at the age of 95.
