= Nick Stern =

British-American photojournalist

Nick Stern is a British-born American photographer who is based in Los Angeles. He has been critical of the behaviour and culture of paparazzi photographers and the use of images from Instagram by news organisations.

== Biography ==
Stern is from Hertfordshire, England. Stern established the independent news agency First News Ltd. in 2000. In 2009 he established news agency RedThink Media with David Thompson.

In November 2004 Stern took photographs of a play fort that David and Victoria Beckham were building in the grounds of their home in Hertfordshire without planning permission from East Hertfordshire District Council. Stern had previously revealed in January 2004 that the couple had built a chapel in the ground of their house with planning permission. His photographs of the fort were bought by the 'News of the World. The Beckhams subsequently sued Stern's company, First Press, for harassment and a breach of their right to a private life under the Human Rights Act 1998. He was represented by Carter Ruck on a No win, no fee arrangement. The arrangement meant that the Beckhams might have had to pay the legald costs of both sides had they lost the case. Stern said of the case that the Beckhams " ... weren't even in England when I took the photographs, and have spent their career consenting to innumerable stories in which their private lives were only too willingly on show. Many of those stories and pictures had come from me, and they had never once complained". The case was settled in 2006 in what was described by The Guardian as a "barely even pyrrhic" victory with the Beckhams having to pay between £40-60,000. The Beckhams had originally demanded £75,000 in damages.

He moved to the United States in 2007 and became a US citizen in 2019. In 2008 Stern left the entertainment news agency Splash News in protest at the paparazzi photographing of the performer Britney Spears. Stern described his time as part of the group of photographers following Spears as having a "culture of male toxicity and bravado among the photographers and doing the craziest things was almost worn as a badge of honour". He wrote an opinion piece critical of paparazzi behaviour for the HuffPost in 2012. He subsequently joined the Los Angeles based Crocmedia News agency as their picture editor and chief photographer. In 2015 Stern withdrew his permission for The Sun newspaper to use his images from their archive in protest at their treatment of the journalist Anthony France.

Stern is critical of news organisations that use images from Instagram and Hipstamatic. In a 2012 column for CNN he wrote that apps that produce images were "equally unethical or perhaps even more so. The image never existed in any other place than the eye of the app developer" and that "A news photographer is there to record, not to produce works of art". He appeared on a 2012 edition of the Off The Ramp podcast from LA List to speak about it.

Stern is a member of the British Press Photographers Association, the Chartered Institute of Journalists and the National Press Photographers Association.

Stern sought to recreate the works of the street artist Banksy using people, costumes and props in his project "You Are Not Banksy".

== Incidents ==
On 30 January 2020 Stern was documenting a Black Lives Matter in Fairfax when he alleges that he was beaten by police of the Los Angeles Police Department and shot in the thigh by a rubber bullet. Stern later sued the LAPD for "assault and battery, negligence, intentional infliction of emotional distress and negligent infliction of emotional distress". His photographs of the protest were sold to the MailOnline.

In 2024 Stern had his camera smashed by a pro-Israeli protestor while covering a protest between supporters of Israel and Palestine in Los Angeles on 23 June 2024.

On 8 June 2025 Stern was shot by a flash-bang projectile round in his leg at close range while photographing the Los Angeles protests against the Immigration and Customs Enforcement (ICE) raids to arrest illegal immigrants. He subsequently underwent emergency surgery to remove the projectile.
