= 49th Military Police Brigade =

- Shoulder sleeve insignia
- Active: Unknown - 1997, 2005–present
- Country: United States
- Allegiance: California
- Type: Military police
- Size: Brigade
- Part of: U.S. Army National Guard: California Army National Guard
- Garrison/HQ: Fairfield, California (Headquarters)
- Mottos: Pride and Power
- Engagements: 1992 Los Angeles riots Iraq War; June 2025 Los Angeles protests

Commanders
- Current commander: Lt. Col. Eric W. Sharyer

Insignia
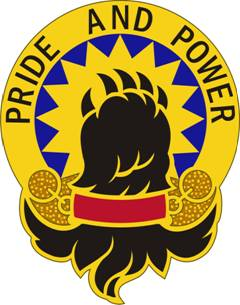
- Distinctive unit insignia

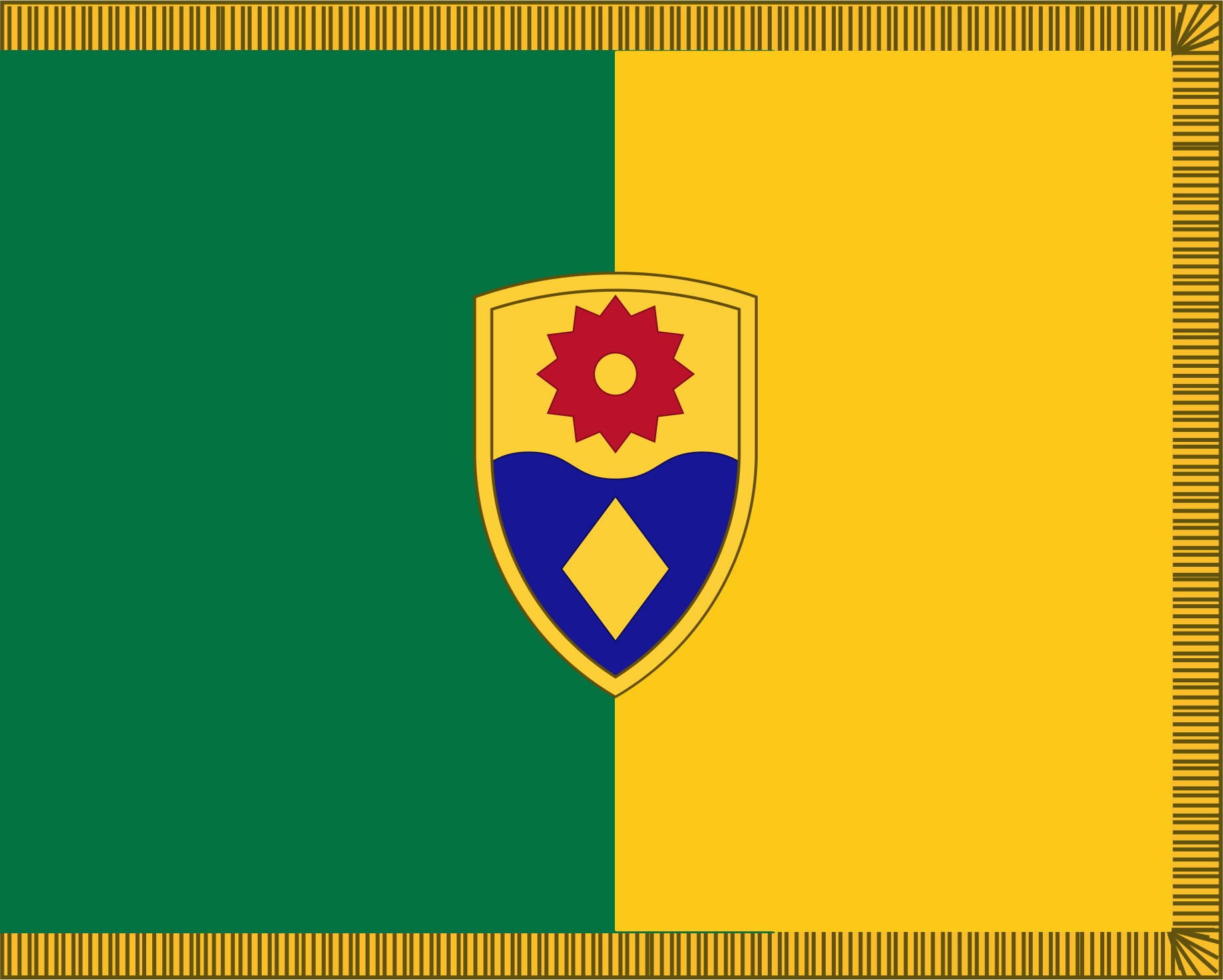
- 49th Military Police Brigade Flag

The 49th Military Police Brigade is California's only Army National Guard military police brigade and is headquartered in Fairfield, California. The 49th's primary role in California is to provide defense support to civilian authorities (DSCA) in the northern region of the state. As part of its federal mission, the 49th Military Police Brigade stands ready to deploy and respond to support missions around the world. The brigade is the part of the Homeland Response Force (HRF).

== History ==
The 49th was officially reorganized in May 2005 and was immediately deployed forward in support of Operation Iraqi Freedom (OIF). During its OIF tour, the 49th was tasked with the training of fledgling Iraqi Police force and maintained command and control over 3-thousand Soldiers in three military police battalions.

=== Operation Iraqi Freedom (2005–07) ===
The 49th MP Brigade reorganized on 16 January 2005, specifically to mobilize and deploy in support of Operation Iraqi Freedom. The brigade mobilized at Fort Hood, TX in May 2005. They conducted four months of post mobilization training and deployed to Iraq, through Kuwait in October 2005. The unit formally took over the mission from the 42nd Military Police Brigade, Fort Lewis, WA, on 2 November 2005.

The mission of the brigade was to provide military police support to Multi-National Forces-Iraq, as well as support to the Iraqi Police. As part of its support to the Iraqi police, the brigade formed Police Transition Teams which worked closely with local police in 14 of Iraq's 18 provinces.

In addition to its mission to train the Iraqi police, they also provided security for Iraq's Tier 1 government officials, including the President and Prime Minister of Iraq. They also provided security for the US Embassy in Baghdad and personal security for the US Ambassador, Deputy US Ambassador, and the UN Ambassador and Deputy.

While theater level detention operations where the responsibility of the 43rd Military Police Brigade, the brigades 709th Military Police Battalion did assist the 101st Airborne Division in running their brigade and division internment facilities until that mission was withdrawn.

The brigade also conducted law and order missions for Victory Base Complex, COB Speicher, LSA Anaconda, and Talil Air Base. This mission enabled commanders to provide a safe and secure environment for their soldiers to live.

The brigade was relieved of its mission in March 2007.

While deployed the brigade commanded military police units from the Regular Army stationed in CONUS, Europe, and Korea, National Guard from eight states and the District of Columbia, one US Army Reserve region, and the United States Air Force. They consisted of three MP battalions, 23 companies, and five detachments.

== Organization ==
- 49th Military Police Brigade, in Fairfield (CA)
  - Headquarters and Headquarters Company, 49th Military Police Brigade, in Fairfield
  - 143rd Military Police Battalion, in Los Angeles (CA)
    - Headquarters and Headquarters Detachment, 143rd Military Police Battalion, in Los Angeles
    - 40th Military Police Company, at Joint Forces Training Base – Los Alamitos
    - 140th Chemical Company, in Gardena
    - 330th Military Police Company, in Ontario
    - 670th Military Police Company, in National City
  - 185th Military Police Battalion, in Pittsburg (CA)
    - Headquarters and Headquarters Detachment, 185th Military Police Battalion, in Pittsburg
    - 149th Chemical Company, in Lathrop
    - 270th Military Police Company, in Sacramento
    - 870th Military Police Company, in Concord
  - 579th Engineer Battalion, in Santa Rosa (CA)
    - Headquarters and Headquarters Company, 579th Engineer Battalion, in Santa Rosa
    - Forward Support Company, 579th Engineer Battalion, in Santa Rosa
    - 129th Engineer Detachment (Concrete Section), at Camp Roberts
    - 132nd Engineer Company (Multirole Bridge), in Redding
    - 216th Engineer Company (Mobility Augmentation Company), at March Air Reserve Base
    - 217th Ordnance Company (EOD), at Camp Roberts
    - 235th Engineer Company (Sapper), in Petaluma
    - 315th Engineer Company (Vertical Construction Company), at March Air Reserve Base
    - 649th Engineer Company (Engineer Construction Company), in Chico
      - Detachment 1, 649th Engineer Company (Engineer Construction Company), in Red Bluff
      - Detachment 2, 649th Engineer Company (Engineer Construction Company), in Sacramento
    - 1401st Engineer Platoon (Quarry), at Camp Roberts
