= Military response to protest =

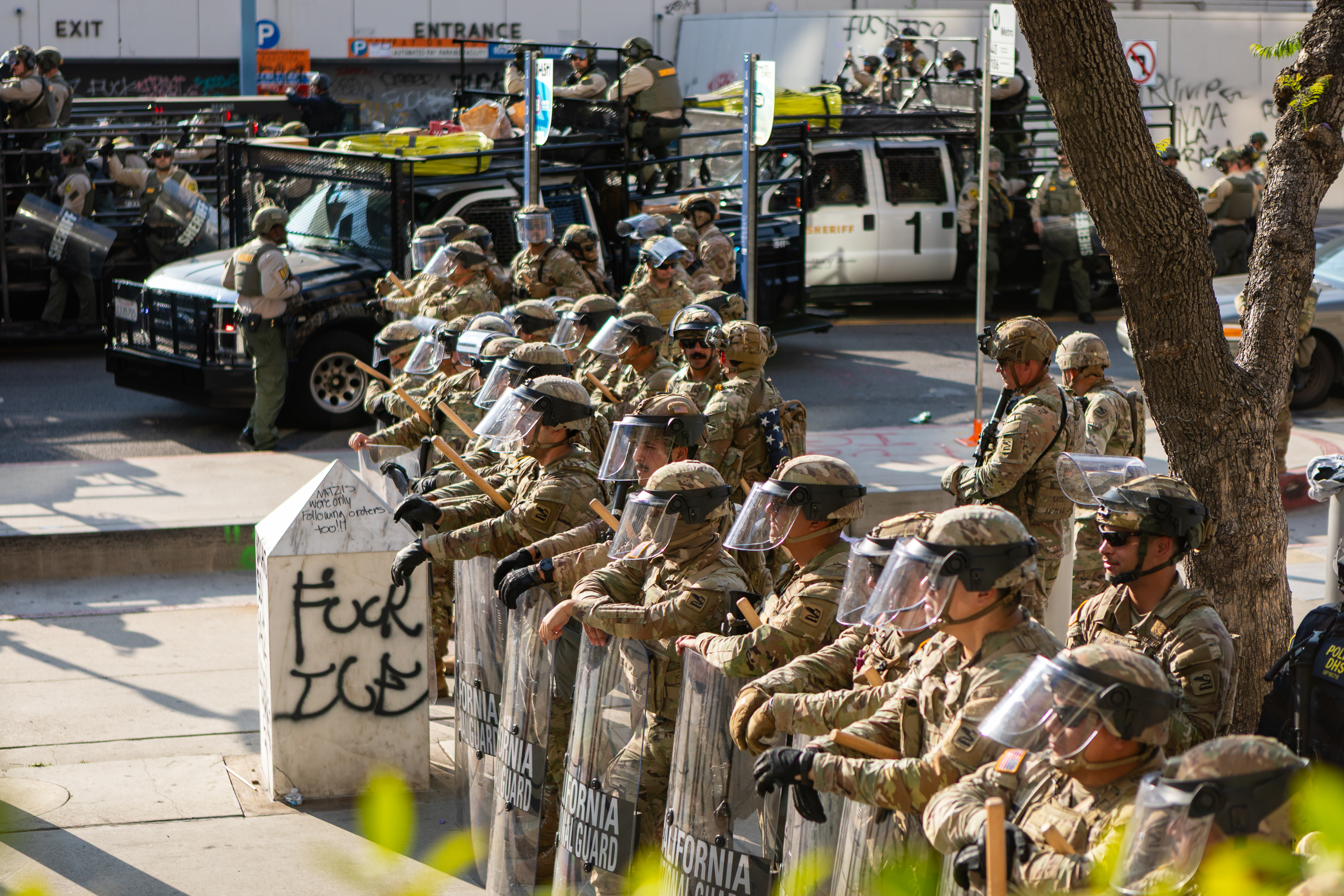
California National Guardsmen along with LASD in 2025 Los Angeles protests

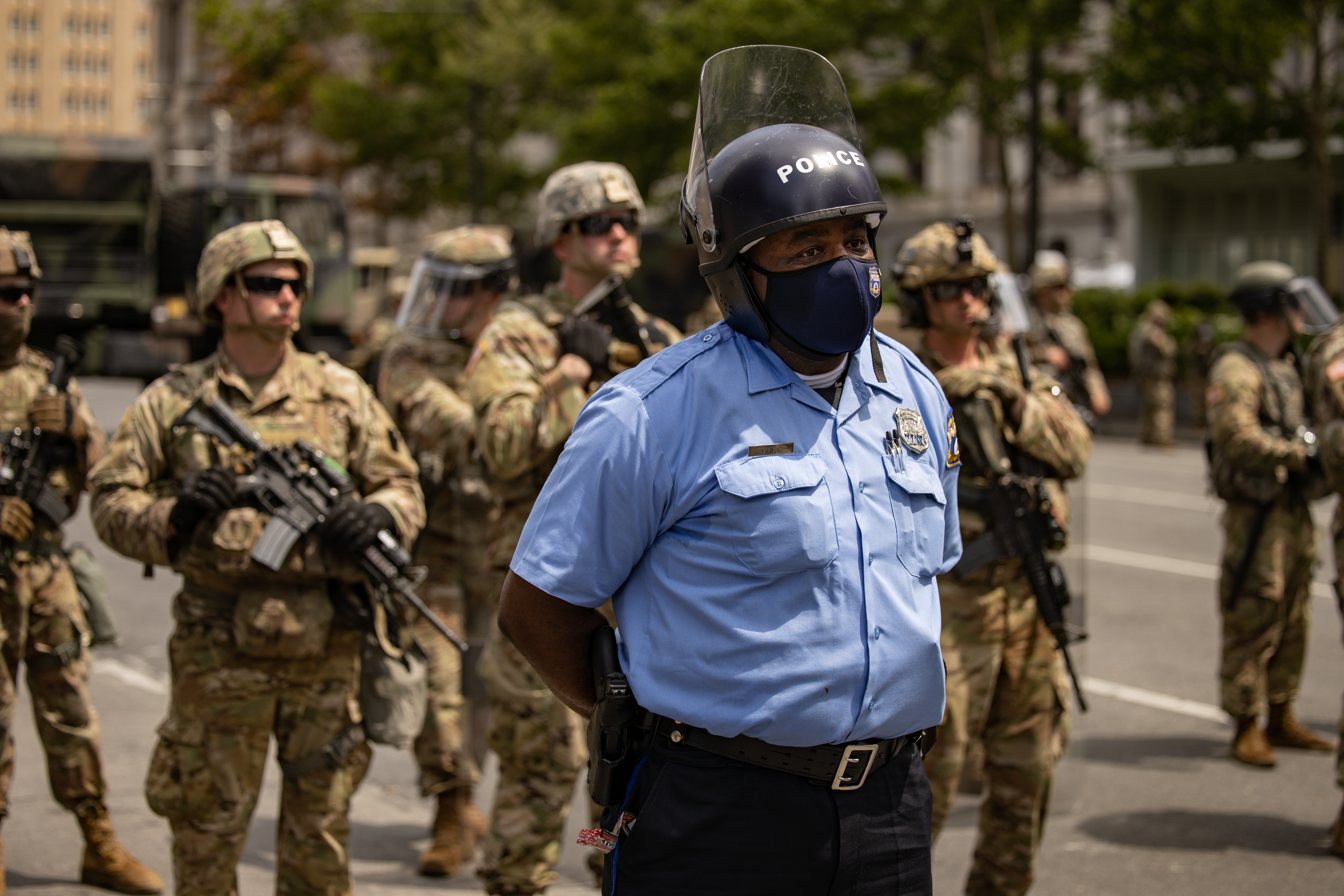
Philadelphia police officer in fronts of Pennsylvania National Guardsmen during George Floyd protests

Military response to protest is the intervention of a state’s military in mass demonstrations of political dissent.

Protests are sometimes contained by protest policing. When police forces are unable to contain protests, state leaders are likely to call on the military to intervene. Armies ordered to intervene in domestic protests may obey orders, refuse to intervene, or intervene conditionally. Soldiers' training conditions them for violent response, making military intervention in protests more likely to result in civilian casualties than protest policing.

== Under authoritarian regimes ==
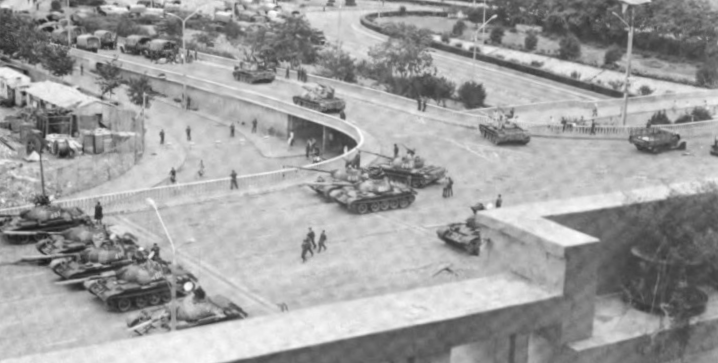
PLAGF tanks deployed during the 1989 Tiananmen Square protests and massacre

Authoritarian regimes use a wide array of security forces to control dissent, including various kinds of police services and irregular or government militias. Deployment of the military may be an indicator that protests are perceived as a serious threat requiring a last resort.

In protests against authoritarian rule, a military’s choice to defend the incumbent regime or defect from the ruling party is the single largest variable predicting the success or failure of the protest movement—although no single variable determines the outcome of any social movement.

Internal structuring of the military to prevent coups, known as coup-proofing, is a factor that shapes military response to popular expressions of dissent.

=== Patterns and trends ===
A 2018 study of military interventions in nonviolent protests against authoritarian regimes found that the military responded with repression of protests in nearly 50% of cases. A loyalty shift in the military toward the opposition was the second most likely outcome, though an all-out coup occurred in only six of the forty protest events analyzed in the study. A loyalty shift in the military was strongly correlated with the exit of authoritarian leaders, and eventual establishment of a democratic regime, and a military coup generally resulted in the establishment of a new dictator.
