= 42nd Military Police Brigade =

Military police brigade

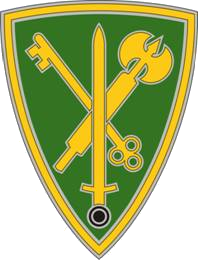
- The 42nd Military Police Brigade's combat service identification badge
- Active: 25 January 1968 – 1 July 1992; 16 October 2004 – 29 May 2025
- Country: United States
- Branch: United States Army
- Type: Military police brigade
- Role: Militaristic law enforcement
- Size: Brigade
- Part of: I Corps
- Garrison/HQ: Joint Base Lewis-McChord, Washington, U.S.
- Nickname: "The Protectors" (special designation)
- Motto: "Integrity of Action"

Commanders
- Commanding officer: Colonel Jessie J. Brewster, USA
- Command Sergeant Major: CSM Brian J. Waananen, USA

Insignia
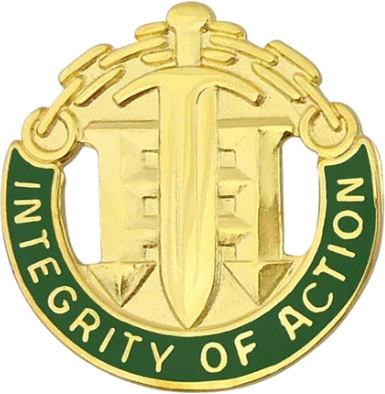
- Distinctive unit insignia

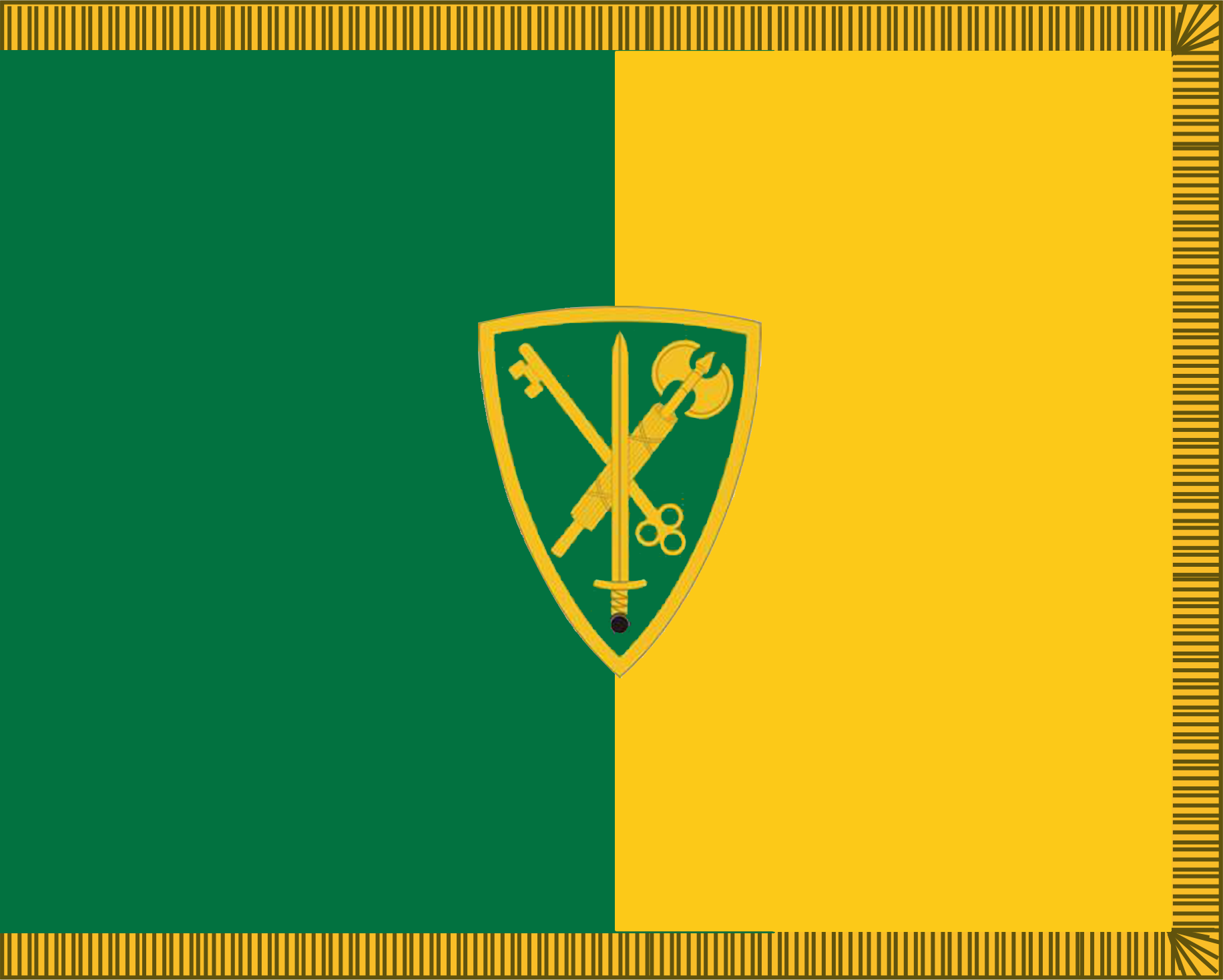
- Flag

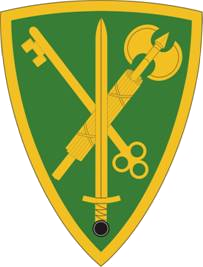
- Patch

The 42nd Military Police Brigade was a military police brigade of the United States Army based at Joint Base Lewis-McChord in Washington. The brigade was a subordinate unit of I Corps. The brigade was inactivated on 29 May 2025 during a ceremony at Joint Base Lewis McChord.

First activated as a customs unit in post-World War II Germany, the brigade has a long history with United States Army Europe. Its duties as a customs unit meant that the unit was garrisoned in Germany for over forty years from 1950 until 1990, never seeing action in the U.S. operations of the Korean War, Vietnam War, or the Persian Gulf War. It was deactivated during the post-Cold War drawdown of the U.S. military.

Reactivated in 2004, the brigade provides corrections and force protection for both I Corps and Joint Base Lewis-McChord. The brigade and its subordinate units have seen several tours in support of the Iraq War's Operation Iraqi Freedom and the Global War on Terrorism's Operation Enduring Freedom.

The brigade was inactivated on 29 May 2025 during a ceremony at Joint Base Lewis McChord.

== Organization ==
The brigade is a subordinate unit of the I Corps, and is separate, meaning that it does not report to a division level headquarters, even during theater operations.

The brigade contains four prime components, all headquartered at Joint Base Lewis-McChord. The Brigade's two permanently assigned MP battalions are the 504th and 508th Military Police Battalions at Joint Base Lewis-McChord. The Brigade also contains a Force Protection unit and a detachment for the Brigade's Provost Marshal.

Additionally, with the reflagging of the 593rd Sustainment Brigade as an Expeditionary Sustainment Command, the 42nd became a subordinate unit to the 593rd ESC and ADCON for the 13th CSSB JBLM, WA. As of 16 October 2017, 42nd MP BDE, returned to I Corps as a direct report unit.

== History ==
=== Origins ===
The 42nd Military Police Group traces its lineage back to the 7751st Military Police Detachment, which was established on 21 March 1949, to fight organized and widespread black-market activities which posed a serious threat to the German economy. The unit enforced USEUCOM Customs Regulations, investigated violations, controlled parcel post shipments of black marketable goods, and staffed twenty-three border stations used by U.S. military personnel crossing the international borders of post-World War II, the U.S. occupied Germany.

In August 1950, the U.S. High Commission for Germany requested the services of the "Customs Unit," later designated as the 42d Military Police Detachment, to control the eastward movement of restricted goods to "Satellite Bloc" countries. With the increase in tensions between the United States and the Soviet Union, this function was important to U.S. interests in Europe. On 1 November 1952, the detachment was relieved of its strategic export control function, which was subsequently resumed by German authorities. In May 1955, Germany regained sovereignty over its land from U.S. military forces. The rights, privileges, and obligations of the foreign forces and their members stationed in Germany were then based on the Bonn forces convention, the forerunner of the North Atlantic Treaty Organization Status of Forces Agreement (NATO SOFA) and the supplementary agreement that followed. As a result, the unit was charged with establishing customs controls within Germany. It was because of this responsibility that the unit would never be deployed in support of the Korean War or the Vietnam War.

=== Cold War years ===
On 25 January 1968, Headquarters and Headquarters Detachment, 42nd Military Police Group was constituted in the Regular Army and activated in Germany. The group was charged with providing customs enforcement and maintaining liaison and cooperation with German customs authorities at all levels. In addition, the group is responsible for establishing customs policies and procedures for the Federal Republic of Germany and to negotiate with German authorities on questions of procedure and U.S. forces entitlements arising from tax and customs issues within the NATO Status of Forces Agreement. It received a Meritorious Unit Commendation for its outstanding job performing this role. In 1969, the group received its own distinctive unit insignia.

On 1 July 1974, the 42d Military Police Group was transferred to the 15th Military Police Brigade, retaining its missions and affiliation with United States Army Europe. On 13 December 1974, drug suppression and anti-hijacking protection were added to the missions of the 42d Military Police Group. On 1 June 1976, relieved from it assignment to 15th MP Brigade, the 42nd MP Group was reassigned to U.S. Army Europe and Seventh Army and, on 21 October 1977, placed under the 21st Support Command.

On 1 December 1977, the Commander of the 42nd MP Group became the Executive Agent for all customs matters in U.S. European Command. As the Executive Agent, the group commander provided staff supervision over the U.S. Military Customs inspection programs in 11 countries throughout Europe. This responsibility included staff supervision of 169 military customs inspection programs operated by the U.S. Army, U.S. Navy and U.S. Air Force.

On 21 January 1978, the 42d MP Group was reassigned to Headquarters, U.S. Army Europe/7th Army (Office of the Deputy Commander in Chief) and converted into a major command. In August 1983, the Commander of the 42d Military Police Group was also designated the USAREUR Executive Agent for customs for U.S. Forces personnel in Germany.

The brigade's responsibilities in Europe prevented it from being deployed in the Gulf War although many of its soldiers did participate in customs clearing much of the cargo and equipment that the U.S. forces shipped back to the U.S. after the war. In August 1994, the 42nd Military Police Group was deactivated with the military drawdown of U.S. Military forces in Europe. In May 2004, the still inactive unit was redesignated as a brigade, in preparation for its reactivation that fall.

=== Iraq War ===
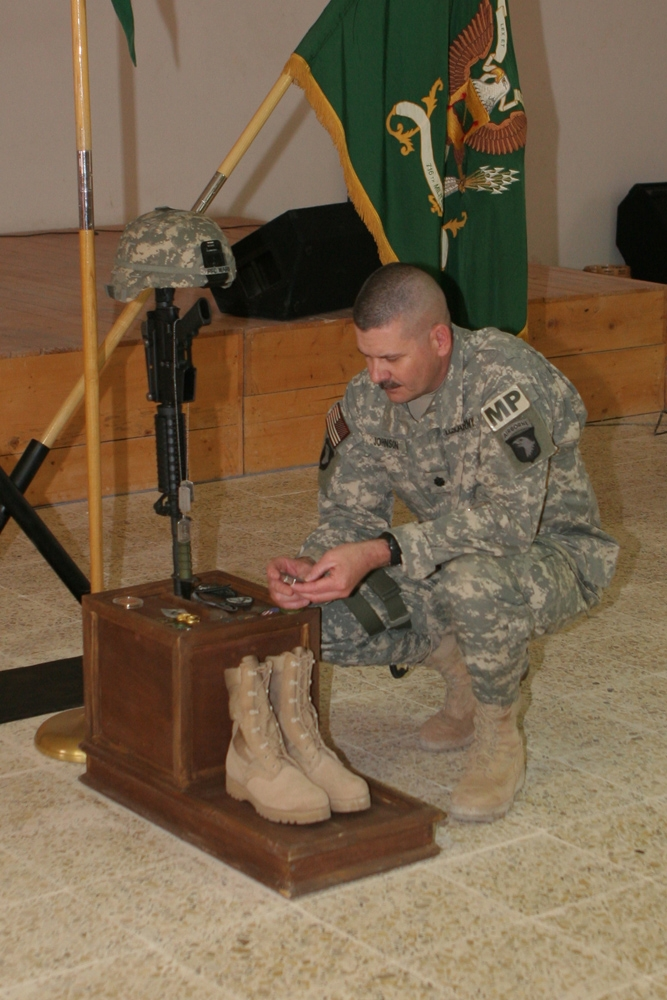
A 716th MP BN Commander mourning a fallen comrade at a ceremony in Iraq in 2008

In late June 2004, the 1st Military Police Brigade (Provisional) based at Joint Base Lewis-McChord, Washington, received word that it would be reflagged as the 42nd Military Police Brigade. On 15 October 2004 the provisional brigade was deactivated and the 42d Military Police Brigade was activated as the I Corps Military Police Brigade. The next day, the brigade received its own shoulder sleeve insignia. Responsibilities of the Brigade at Joint Base Lewis-McChord include the direction of inter-service corrections operations at the Northwestern Joint Regional Corrections Facility, as well as emergency services and force protection operations for the Joint Base Lewis-McChord area. The unit received word from the Department of the Army that it would deploy to Iraq less than thirty days after activation.

The 42nd Military Police Brigade deployed to Baghdad, Iraq from November 2004 to November 2005 in support of Operation Iraqi Freedom, relieving the 89th Military Police Brigade which had previously been assigned there. The brigade operated out of Victory Base Complex during its tour. During this tour, subordinate units of the brigade were responsible for training cadets of the Baghdad civilian Police department. This training included law training, human rights education, first aid, and weapons training on Glock-19s and AK-47s. They also had a counter-terrorism class for Iraqi officers. During the assignment, the brigade suffered several casualties, including multiple soldiers killed by improvised explosive devices, and another Soldier killed in a rocket-propelled grenade attack. Their organizational operation during the deployment received praise, and was the basis for the organization of subsequent Military Police brigades that deployed. After its return from Iraq, the Brigade's operations were assumed by the 49th Military Police Brigade. The brigade received another Meritorious Unit Commendation for its work during the deployment.

The brigade received orders to deploy to Iraq again in spring of 2008. Its assignment was to conduct theater wide internment facility and reconciliation center operations, as well as managing the Iraqi Correctional Officer Training academies. Subordinate units of the Brigade have been deploying to Iraq regularly. The 571st MP Company deployed for 15 months, from November 2006 until January 2008. The 504th MP Battalion deployed to Iraq in July 2007. Also deployed were the 54th and 170th Military Police Companies.

On 16 March 2008, the brigade deployed again to Iraq, assuming command of Task Force Bucca from the 300th Military Police Brigade. The 42nd MP Brigade operated out of Forward Operating Base Bucca, located in the southeastern corner of Iraq near the port of Umm Qasr and the border with Kuwait. Duties of the Brigade during this deployment included force protection, operation of internment facilities, and detainee reconciliation, teaching Iraqi prisoners to read and write and training them in technical skills that will boost their employment potential. During the deployment, soldiers of the brigade worked closely with Iraqi police forces and United States Navy forces to operate the facilities. On 2 June 2009, the brigade cased its colors and transferred command of Task Force Bucca to the 89th MP Brigade Tactical Actions Center. The brigade redeployed to Joint Base Lewis-McChord in mid-June. The brigade received another Meritorious Unit Commendation for its work during the deployment.

=== War in Afghanistan ===
The brigade was scheduled to deploy to Afghanistan in the winter of 2012.

Subordinate units of the brigade have been deployed to Afghanistan. 66th MP CO was Deployed to Afghanistan January 2007 till April 2008. The HHD, 504th Military Police Battalion and 170th Military Police Company deployed to Afghanistan in June 2010 for 12 months. Also deployed was the 54th and the 595th Military Police Company. The 571st Military Police Company deployed to Jalalabad, Afghanistan in December 2012. The 170th Military Police Company deployed to Bagram, Afghanistan in mid 2013.

=== Inactivation ===
The brigade was inactivated on 29 May 2025 during a ceremony at Joint Base Lewis McChord.

== Honors ==
=== Unit decorations ===
Ribbon	Award	Year	Notes
	Meritorious Unit Commendation (Army)	1968	for service in Germany
	Meritorious Unit Commendation (Army)	2004–2005	for service Iraq
	Meritorious Unit Commendation (Army)	2008–2009	for service Iraq

=== Campaign streamers ===
Conflict	Streamer	Year(s)
Operation Iraqi Freedom	Iraq	2004–2005
Operation Iraqi Freedom	Iraq	2008–2009
