= Coalition for Humane Immigrant Rights of Los Angeles =

U.S. nonprofit organization

Coalition for Humane Immigrant Rights (CHIRLA)
- Formation: 1993
- Location: 2533 West 3rd Street, Suite 101, Los Angeles, California 90057
- Executive director: Angelica Salas
- Website: www.chirla.org

The Coalition for Humane Immigrant Rights, also known as CHIRLA, is a Los Angeles county-based organization focusing on immigrant rights. While the organization did evolve from a local level, it is now recognized at a national level. The Coalition for Humane Immigrant Rights of Los Angeles organizes and serves individuals, institutions and coalitions to build power, transform public opinion, and change policies to achieve full human, civil and labor rights. The Coalition for Humane Immigrant Rights of Los Angeles also has aided in passing new laws and policies to benefit the immigrant community.

== History ==
The Coalition for Humane Immigrant Rights of Los Angeles is considered to be one of Los Angeles' oldest organizations advocating for immigrant rights. In 1986, the creation of the Coalition for Humane Immigrant Rights of Los Angeles or CHIRLA, was funded by the Ford Foundation in efforts to help educate immigrants about the Immigration Reform and Control Act of 1986. The Ford Foundation also had hopes of addressing anti-immigrant sentiment that was evolving within the context of immigration debate in the United States of America. Following the funding from the Ford Foundation, CHIRLA was to help illegal immigrants about the pathway to citizenship while also informing immigrants about their workers' right in the labor force.

CHIRLA was founded in 1986 as a result of the Immigration Reform and Control Act. Since its founding, CHIRLA has evolved in three major components. When being founded, the organization focused on issues such as providing immigrants the resources to leadership development, organizing and mobilizing. Another component CHIRLA focused on was focusing on its own programs and committees while also trying to create other organizations that were interested on similar issues as CHIRLA. Resulting in a transition from focusing on immigrant issues at a local level to immigrant issues at a national level. This focus helped the organization with challenging laws that limited workers' rights at a local and national level. Present day, CHIRLA works with different organization around the nation in hopes of influencing future federal legislation.

Following the passage of the 1986 Immigration Reform and Control Act, representatives from Central American Resource Center (CARECEN), Asian Pacific American Legal Center (APALC) now known as Asian Americans Advancing Justice, Los Angeles Center for Law and Justice, and Dolores Mission and other voluntary agencies and local legal service coalitions formed a steering committee to coordinate the efforts of charities, legal service organizations, and advocacy organizations. The steering committee served the purpose of different organizations and coalitions collectively working towards issues surrounding the immigrant community. The steering committee would also provided more services to serve as many migrants as possible in Los Angeles. By December 1992, CHIRLA acted on its mission of "advance the human and civil rights of immigrants and refugees and to foster an environment of positive human and community relations in our society." Three years later, CHIRLA had brought together about eighty members of the coalition in order to represent and address different issues within the immigrant community.

With the sponsorship of United Way, CHIRLA was formed. In 1993, it was granted 501(c)(3) non-profit status.

In the same year, faced with major changes to laws pertaining to unauthorized immigrants from California Proposition 187, CHIRLA established a hotline, which allowed immigrants to call in with concerns on different subjects, one specific one being Proposition 187. CHIRLA also established the only Spanish-Language hotline in Southern California, allowing illegal immigrants to voice their concerns about this proposition and attain information on what to do. On the day after the election, November 9, 1994, CHIRLA's hotline reported over 250 calls received that day. In addition, during the 11 months after Proposition 187 was passed, CHIRLA recorded 229 cases of serious rights abuses, 72 of which involved denial of services and discrimination in sectors affected by this proposition, which included schools or health clinics.

During the early 2000s, the federal immigration enforcement intensified, as Program 287(g), which was under the Illegal Immigration Reform and Immigrant Responsibility Act of 1996, began to be used by various states across the United States. As a response, CHIRLA began to take initiative to inform and make illegal immigrants aware of the program and its consequences through factsheets and other resources. In 2006, CHIRLA was a part of the We Are America Alliance, which partook in the 2006 United States Immigration Reform Protests, advocating for immigration reform and was a response to changing immigration policy. The alliance was a major outcome of the protests, in which more than 2 million people were mobilized. During the Bush and Obama Era, The Secure Communities Program was introduced and heavily used, with immigrants being detailed for minor infractions such as routine traffic stops. As a result of consistent activism from multiple groups including CHIRLA, Los Angeles County Sheriff Lee Baca in 2013 announced that his agency would limit their participation in Secure Communities, and would not send fingerprints to ICE for low tier cases.

CHIRLA is led by an eight-person board.

== Activities ==
During the late 1980s, CHIRLA's activities focused on three major areas: education, political advocacy, and community organization. At this time, majority of their advocacy work was centered around helping illegal immigrants fill out their applications that would grant them a form of legal status through the amnesty provision of the Immigration Reform and Control Act. Following a couple of years, the Coalition for Humane Immigrant Rights of Los Angeles created a national hotline designed to connect immigrants (who had just been granted legal status) to resources such as legal aid, health, education and welfare services.

Community organizational campaigns include efforts to organize domestic workers, day laborers, and undocumented students. In 1988, CHIRLA initiated to expand their services to household workers through their Immigrant Women's Taskforce. At the same time, the coalition advocated for the opening of day labor centers in the City of Los Angeles, which eventually led to the opening of the Harbor City Job Center a year later. The focus on these two committees created a shift in the organization's focus. While CHIRLA had been focusing on the advocacy of the undocumented individual, it then shifted to worker's rights and advocating for low-wage workers in the city of Los Angeles. CHIRLA continues to advocate and organize for the Day Laborer, Household Worker and Street Vendor Committees. In 2004, The Coalition for Humane Immigrant Rights of Los Angeles, in collaboration with the San Francisco Bay Area Domestic Worker Coalition and the Los Angeles Pilipino Workers formed the California Domestic Workers' Coalition. The Coalition then introduced Assembly Bill 2536, which upheld domestic workers being compensated for overtime and fined employers who failed to comply with this provision. The bill passed in both houses and was vetoed by Governor Arnold Schwarzenegger.

CHIRLA has worked with many different organizations and advocacy networks that targeted specific immigrant rights issues. One of the coalitions, CHIRLA has worked with is the Coalition of Garment Worker Advocates (CGWA). The goal of the Coalition of Garment Worker Advocates was to acknowledge labor law violations in relationship to the Los Angeles garment industry. During the year 2001 came the coalition's creation of the Garment Worker Center. The center provided a space for garment workers to unite and create alternatives to better working conditions. In 1995, CHIRLA and other immigrant rights groups formally established the Sweatshop Watch in response to the El Monte Thai Garment Slavery Case, whose goal was to eliminate the exploitation and illegal working conditions in the garment industry. The Sweatshop Watch group offered social and legal services to the Thai workers in specific, and pushed to meet with the workers who were in INS Detention Centers, to make them aware of their legal rights as an immigrant. The members of this group mobilized to find the Thai workers food, clothing, jobs, housing, and medical care. Many churches, hospitals, and shelters donated places to stay for these immigrants. As a result of these efforts, most of these Thai workers were found a new job within a few months.

The coalition has also been an advocate for undocumented student access to higher education at a state level. CHIRLA established many clubs in local Los Angeles high schools in order to provide support and resources to undocumented students. The coalition also contributed to the campaign for undocumented students and their accessibility to in-state tuition while attending California's public higher education institutions. CHIRLA was one of the advocacy groups that advocated alongside Assembly member Marco Firebaugh's effort to pass Assembly Bill 540, a California bill which would allow undocumented students in-state tuition. Undocumented students were to have lived in California for at least three years while also graduating high school from an accredited California high school. In 2003, CHIRLA initiated the California Dream Network which would help connect immigrant students groups to federal legislation that would help granting legal status to undocumented students.

Education is carried out through seminars, office visits, telephone calls, trainings, information fairs, townhall meetings, and media outreach. CHIRLA, along with the production company Cinético Productions, produced the informational DVD Know Your Rights!

Political advocacy centers around pressuring lawmakers to pass laws "that promote and protect the human and civil rights of immigrants."

== See also ==
- Central America Resource Center
