= California Assembly Bill 540 (2001) =

Bill on California public college tuition

California State Legislature
- Full name: Assembly Bill 540
- Introduced: May 1, 2001
- Assembly voted: September 14, 2001
- Senate voted: September 12, 2001
- Signed into law: October 12, 2001
- Sponsor(s): Marco Antonio Firebaugh, Abel Maldonado
- Governor: Gray Davis

Status: Current legislation

California's Assembly Bill 540 was signed into law by Governor Gray Davis on October 12, 2001, allowing access to in-state tuition rates for undocumented and other eligible students at California's public colleges and universities. The law allows students who attended high school in California, among other eligibility requirements, to pay in-state tuition fees instead of out-of-state tuition at California's public institutions of higher education, including the University of California, California State University, and California Community Colleges. The law has been important in the pursuit of college accessibility for undocumented students in California, but not all beneficiaries are undocumented, as approximately two thirds of those benefitted possess U.S. citizenship.

The bill allows students who meet certain criteria to lower the cost of attendance at California's public colleges and universities, as it meets the state's standards to establish California residency and benefit from in-state tuition costs. It has been especially significant for undocumented students pursuing higher education in California, as they face additional obstacles such as higher rates of poverty, lack of government-sponsored financial assistance, and social marginalization.

== Eligibility Requirements ==
Students, including those undocumented, must meet all the following requirements to be considered for AB 540 eligibility:

- Three full-time years of attendance or a combined equivalent at the following:
  - California high school
  - California adult school
  - California community college

Alternatively

- Three years of California high school coursework and three years of attendance at a California elementary or secondary school, or any combination of the two.

Or

Meet one of the following:

- Successful graduation from a California high school or equivalent (GED).
- Obtained an associate degree from a California community college.
- Fulfill transfer requirements from a California community college to a UC or a CSU (Such as IGETC certification).

== Tuition Impact ==
The cost of attendance of California's public colleges and universities varies depending by campus. To highlight the impact of AB 540 eligibility, the following is the annual average cost of undergraduate tuition for in-state vs. out-of-state at each system:

- California Community College system: $1,636 vs. $6,797
- California State University system: $5,742 vs. Resident tuition plus $396 per semester unit or $246 per quarter unit
- University of California system: $13,900 vs. $40,644

== History of Anti-Undocumented Legislation in Education ==
The issue of undocumented students and education became prominent in the late 20th century. In the Plyler v Doe case of 1982, the United States Supreme Court ruled that undocumented students can't be denied a k-12 education due to their immigration status, the court interpreted undocumented children as qualifying “persons” under the 14th Amendment of the Constitution.

There have also been occurrences of anti-immigration movements with a focus on post-secondary education. The Federal Illegal Immigration Reform and Immigrant Responsibility Act (IIRIRA) of 1996 prohibits undocumented immigrants from access to in-state tuition in public higher education institutions. However, states have been able to overcome IIRIRA through the passage of legislature that allows any individual who meets guidelines to receive in-state tuition, one example being California's AB 540. Laws which favor in-state tuition for undocumented youth have allowed them easier access to California's public institutions of higher education, as it eases the cost of attendance engendered from their immigration status.

In 1994 California voters passed Proposition 187, engendering a new wave of anti-immigrant sentiments aimed to strip undocumented residents from accessing social services such as healthcare, education, and law enforcement. In fact, as many as 300,000 undocumented students would have been barred from attending primary and secondary public schools. The proposition originally passed with voter support, but was later challenged in the courts and found unconstitutional by District Court Judge Marianne Pfaelzer in March 1998.

== States with similar legislature ==
In 2001, the first state to adopt in-state tuition legislation was a victory by undocumented students in Texas. A wave of other states followed suit shortly after, states such as California (2001), New York (2001), Utah (2002), Washington (2003), Illinois (2003), Oklahoma (2004), Kansas (2004), New Mexico (2005), and Nebraska (2006) passed similar legislation allowing access to in-state tuition for undocumented students.

As of 2018, the political landscape has changed as states have contended with the issue of providing in-state tuition to such students. The most notable change has been Arizona's Supreme Court blocking in-state tuition for undocumented students in April 2018. As of May 2018, a total of six states have laws barring undocumented students from in-state tuition.

On the contrary, undocumented students and advocates have pushed effectively for other states to adopt legislation to access in-state tuition, in fact, as of May 2018, 23 states have adopted legislation allowing in-state tuition, and sometimes even provided access to financial assistance to cover educational costs.
