= 1989 United States Army Pacific order of battle =

In 1989, the United States Army Pacific had its headquarters at Fort Shafter in Hawaii, and its units were stationed within the United States. Overseas forces included the United States Army, Japan, and the Eighth United States Army in South Korea.

== I Corps ==
=== 6th Infantry Division ===
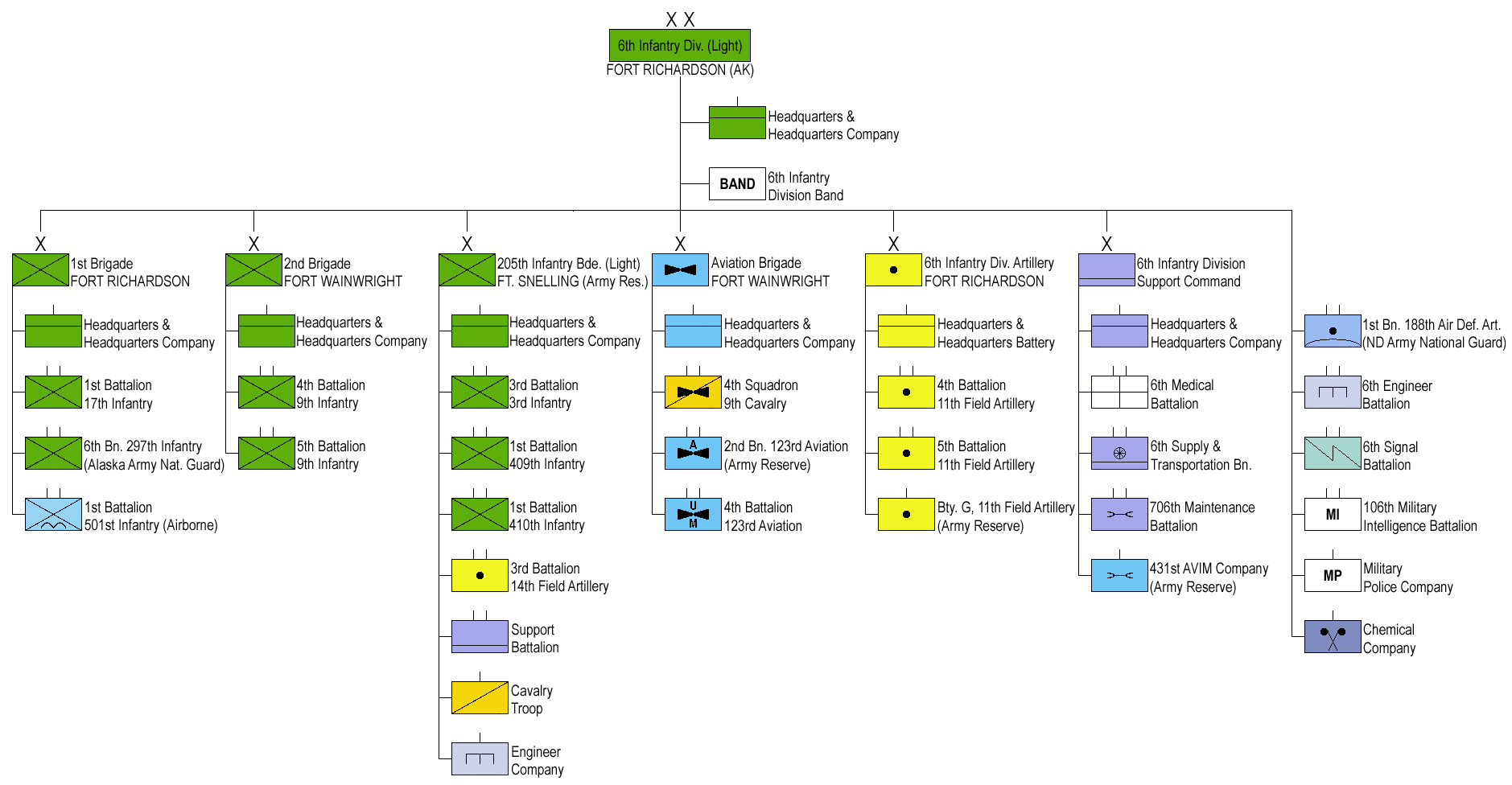
6th Infantry Division (Light) in 1989 (click to enlarge)

- 6th Infantry Division (Light), Fort Richardson, Alaska
  - Headquarters & Headquarters Company
  - 1st Brigade, Fort Richardson, Alaska
    - Headquarters & Headquarters Company
    - 1st Battalion, 17th Infantry
    - 2nd Battalion, 17th Infantry (reflagged 1st Battalion, 501st Infantry (Airborne) on 16 October 1989)
  - 2nd Brigade, Fort Wainwright, Alaska
    - Headquarters & Headquarters Company
    - 4th Battalion, 9th Infantry
    - 5th Battalion, 9th Infantry
    - 6th Battalion, 297th Infantry (Alaska Army National Guard assigned 1 September 1989)
  - 205th Infantry Brigade (Light), Fort Snelling, Minnesota (Army Reserve)
    - Headquarters and Headquarters Company
    - 3rd Battalion, 3rd Infantry, Saint Paul, Minnesota
    - 1st Battalion, 409th Infantry, St. Cloud, Minnesota
    - 1st Battalion, 410th Infantry, Iowa City, Iowa
    - 3rd Battalion, 14th Field Artillery, Sioux City, Iowa (18 × M101 105 mm towed howitzer)
    - Support Battalion
    - Cavalry Troop
    - Engineer Company
  - Aviation Brigade, Fort Wainwright
    - Headquarters & Headquarters Company
    - 4th Squadron, 9th Cavalry (Reconnaissance)
    - 2nd Battalion, 123rd Aviation (Attack), Saint Paul, Minnesota (Army Reserve)
    - 4th Battalion, 123rd Aviation (Combat Support)
  - Division Artillery, Fort Richardson, Alaska
    - Headquarters & Headquarters Battery
    - 4th Battalion, 11th Field Artillery, Fort Richardson (18 × M101 105 mm towed howitzer)
    - 5th Battalion, 11th Field Artillery, Fort Wainwright (18 × M101 105 mm towed howitzer)
    - Battery G, 11th Field Artillery, Mankato, Minnesota (8 × M198 155 mm towed howitzer)
  - 6th Division Support Command
    - Headquarters & Headquarters Company
    - 6th Medical Battalion
    - 6th Supply & Transportation Battalion, Fort Wainwright
    - 706th Maintenance Battalion, Fort Richardson
    - 431st Aviation Intermediate Maintenance Company, Saint Paul, Minnesota (Army Reserve)
  - 1st Battalion, 188th Air Defense Artillery, Grand Forks, North Dakota (North Dakota Army National Guard)
  - 6th Engineer Battalion, Fort Wainwright
  - 6th Signal Battalion, Fort Richardson
  - 106th Military Intelligence Battalion, Fort Richardson
  - Military Police Company
  - Chemical Company
  - 6th Division Band

=== 7th Infantry Division ===
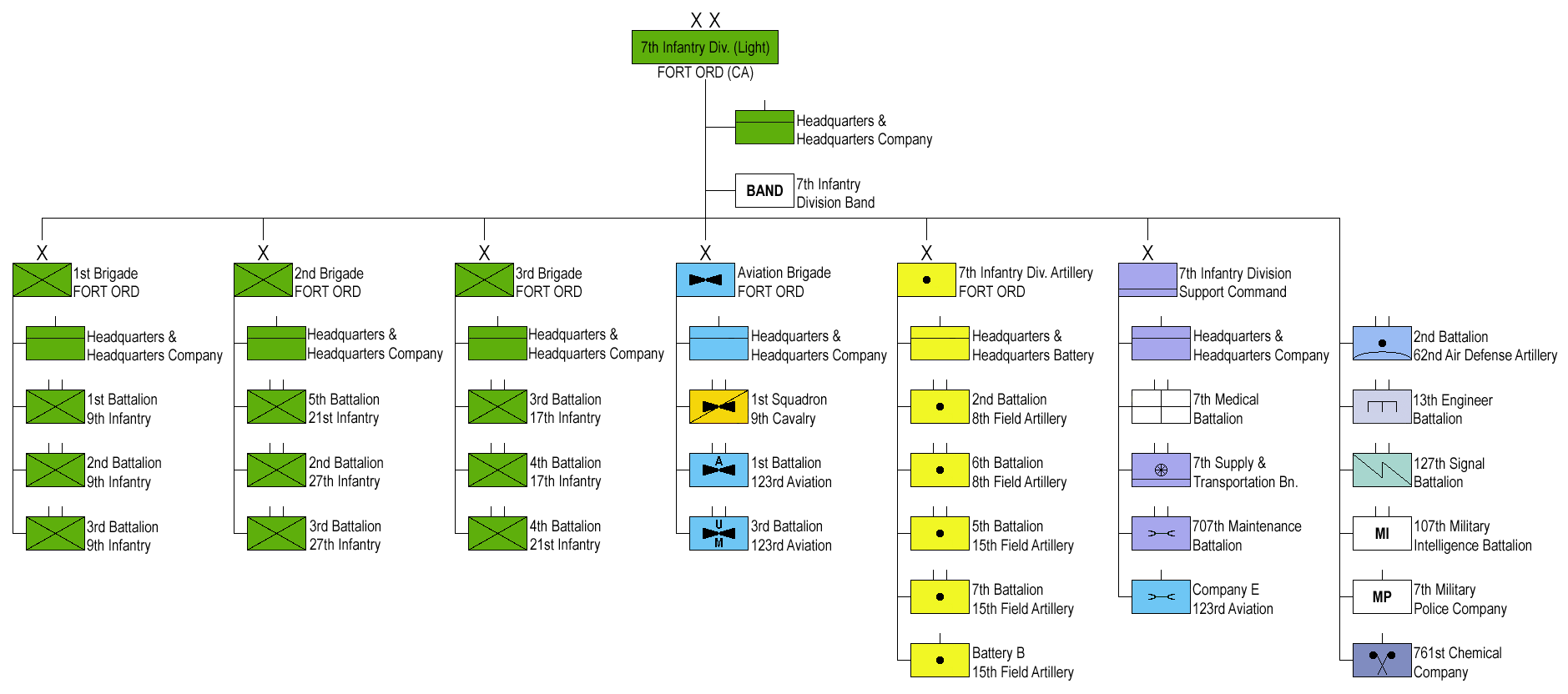
7th Infantry Division (Light) in 1989 (click to enlarge)

- 7th Infantry Division (Light), Fort Ord, California
  - Headquarters & Headquarters Company
  - 1st Brigade
    - 1st Battalion, 9th Infantry Regiment
    - 2nd Battalion, 9th Infantry Regiment
    - 3rd Battalion, 9th Infantry Regiment
  - 2nd Brigade
    - 5th Battalion, 21st Infantry Regiment
    - 2nd Battalion, 27th Infantry Regiment
    - 3rd Battalion, 27th Infantry Regiment
  - 3rd Brigade
    - 3rd Battalion, 17th Infantry Regiment
    - 4th Battalion, 17th Infantry Regiment
    - 4th Battalion, 21st Infantry Regiment
  - Aviation Brigade
    - Headquarters & Headquarters Company
    - 1st Squadron, 9th Cavalry (Reconnaissance)
    - 1st Battalion, 123rd Aviation (Attack)
    - 3rd Battalion, 123rd Aviation (Combat Support)
  - Division Artillery
    - Headquarters & Headquarters Battery
    - 2nd Battalion, 8th Field Artillery (18 × M119 105 mm towed howitzer)
    - 6th Battalion, 8th Field Artillery (18 × M119 105 mm towed howitzer)
    - 5th Battalion, 15th Field Artillery (18 x M198 155 mm towed howitzer, attached I Corps Artillery unit)
    - 7th Battalion, 15th Field Artillery (18 × M119 105 mm towed howitzer)
    - Battery B, 15th Field Artillery (8 × M198 155 mm towed howitzer)
  - Division Support Command
    - Headquarters & Headquarters Company
    - 7th Medical Battalion
    - 7th Supply & Transportation Battalion
    - 707th Maintenance Battalion
    - Company D, 123rd Aviation (Maintenance, redesignated Company E, 123rd Aviation on 16 October 1988)
  - 2nd Battalion, 62nd Air Defense Artillery
  - 13th Engineer Battalion
  - 127th Signal Battalion
  - 107th Military Intelligence Battalion
  - 7th Military Police Company
  - 761st Chemical Company
  - 7th Division Band

=== 25th Infantry Division ===
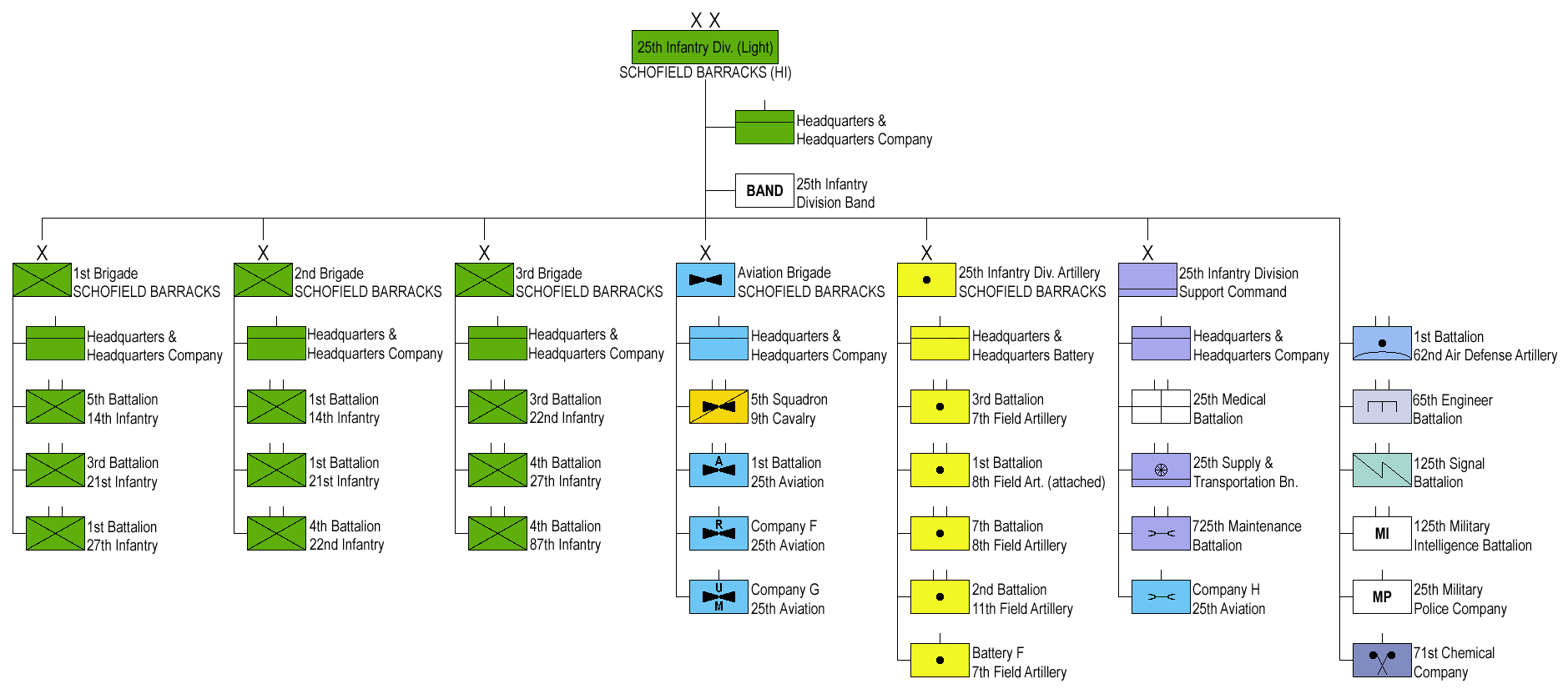
25th Infantry Division (Light) 1989 (click to enlarge)

- 25th Infantry Division (Light), Schofield Barracks, Hawaii
  - Headquarters & Headquarters Company
- 1st Brigade
  - 1st Battalion, 14th Infantry Regiment
  - 1st Battalion, 27th Infantry Regiment
  - 4th Battalion, 27th Infantry Regiment
  - 2nd Brigade
  - 5th Battalion, 14th Infantry Regiment
  - 1st Battalion, 21st Infantry Regiment
  - 3rd Battalion, 21st Infantry Regiment
- 3rd Brigade
  - 3rd Battalion, 22nd Infantry Regiment
  - 4th Battalion, 22nd Infantry Regiment
  - 4th Battalion, 87th Infantry Regiment
- 25th Combat Aviation Brigade
- 3rd Squadron, 4th Cavalry Regiment
- 1st Battalion, 25th Aviation Regiment
- 4th Battalion, 25th Aviation Regiment
- F Company, 25th Aviation Regiment
- 25th Division Artillery
- 3rd Battalion, 7th Field Artillery Regiment (18 × M101 105 mm towed howitzer)
- 7th Battalion, 8th Field Artillery Regiment (18 × M101 105 mm towed howitzer)
- 2nd Battalion, 11th Field Artillery Regiment (18 × M101 105 mm towed howitzer)
- 1st Battalion, 8th Field Artillery Regiment (8 × M198 155 mm towed howitzer)
- 25th Division Support Command
- 65th Engineer Battalion
- 1st Battalion, 62nd Air Defense Artillery Regiment
- 125th Military Intelligence Battalion
- 125th Signal Battalion
- 25th Military Company
- 25th Forward Support Battalion
- 225th Forward Support Battalion
- 325th Forward Support Battalion
- 725th Main Support Battalion

== US Army Japan ==
- IX US Corps Headquarters – Camp Zama

== Eighth United States Army ==
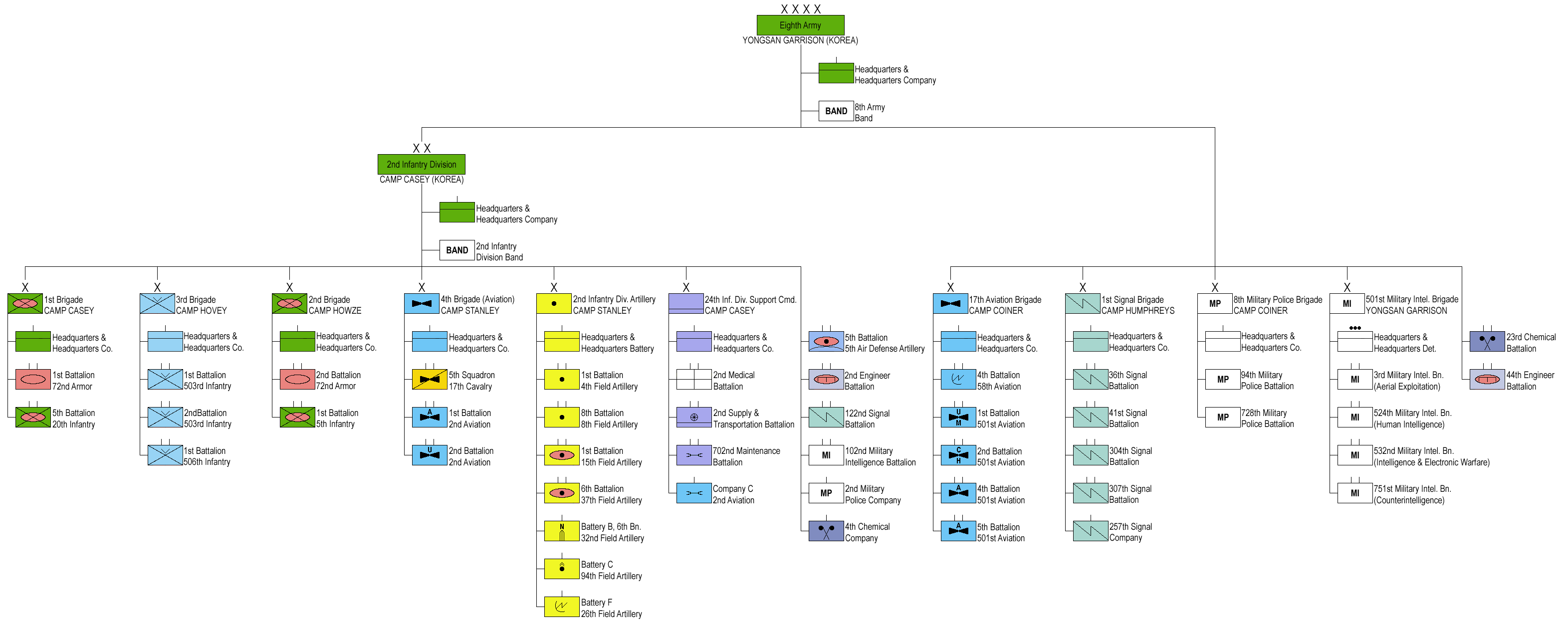
Organisation of Eighth Army in 1989 (click to enlarge)

- Eight Army, Yongsan Garrison, South Korea
  - Headquarters & Headquarters Company
  - ROK-US I Corps, Camp Red Cloud
  - 2nd Infantry Division, Camp Casey
  - 17th Aviation Brigade, Camp Coiner
    - Headquarters & Headquarters Company
    - 4th Battalion, 58th Aviation (Air Traffic Control), Camp Coiner
    - 1st Battalion, 501st Aviation (Assault), Camp Coiner (UH-60A Black Hawk helicopters)
    - 2nd Battalion, 501st Aviation (Medium Lift), Camp Coiner (CH-47D Chinook helicopters)
    - 4th Battalion, 501st Aviation (Attack), Camp Page (AH-1F Cobra & OH-58C Kiowa helicopters)
    - 5th Battalion, 501st Aviation (Attack), Camp Coiner (AH-1F Cobra & OH-58C Kiowa helicopters)
  - 1st Signal Brigade, Camp Humphreys
    - Headquarters & Headquarters Company
    - 36th Signal Battalion
    - 41st Signal Battalion
    - 304th Signal Battalion, Camp Colbern
    - 307th Signal Battalion
    - 257th Signal Company, Camp Humphreys
  - 8th Military Police Brigade (Provisional), Camp Coiner
    - Headquarters & Headquarters Company
    - 94th Military Police Battalion
    - 728th Military Police Battalion
  - 501st Military Intelligence Brigade (Provisional), Yongsan Garrison
    - Headquarters & Headquarters Detachment
    - 3rd Military Intelligence Battalion (Aerial Exploitation), Camp Humphreys
    - 524th Military Intelligence Battalion (Human Intelligence)
    - 532nd Military Intelligence Battalion (Intelligence & Electronic Warfare)
    - 751st Military Intelligence Battalion (Counterintelligence), Camp Humphreys
  - 18th Medical Command, Seoul (the following peacetime listing is incomplete)
    - Headquarters and Headquarters Detachment
    - 52nd Medical Battalion
    - 121st Combat Support Hospital, Camp Humphreys
  - 19th Support Command, Daegu (the following peacetime listing is incomplete)
    - Headquarters and Headquarters Company
    - Special Troops Battalion
    - 20th Area Support Group, Camp Henry
      - Headquarters and Headquarters Company
    - 23rd Area Support Group, Camp Humphreys
      - Headquarters and Headquarters Company
      - 194th Maintenance Battalion
      - 227th Maintenance Battalion
      - Company A, 3rd Battalion 501st Aviation (Aviation Intermediate Maintenance), Camp Humphreys
      - Company A, 3rd Battalion, 501st Aviation (Aviation Intermediate Maintenance), Camp Humphreys
    - 25th Transportation Center (Movement Control), Yongsan Garrison
      - 21st Transportation Company (Command Transport), Yongsan Garrison
      - 46th Transportation Company, Camp Carroll
    - 34th Area Support Group, Seoul
      - Headquarters and Headquarters Company
    - 501st Corps Support Group, Camp Red Cloud
      - Headquarters and Headquarters Company
  - 8th Personnel Command
    - 516th Personnel Service Company
  - 175th Finance Center
    - 176th Finance Support Unit
    - 177th Finance Support Unit
  - 23rd Chemical Battalion
  - 44th Engineer Battalion (Combat) (Heavy), Camp Mercer
  - 8th Army Band
