= 793rd Military Police Battalion =

US Army battalion

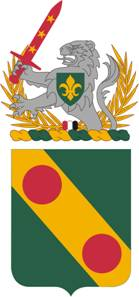
- Coat of arms
- Active: 26 December 1942 – 28 August 2014
- Country: United States
- Branch: United States Army
- Type: Military Police Corps
- Role: Military police
- Size: Battalion
- Part of: United States Army Alaska

Commanders
- Last Commander: Lieutenant Colonel Kirt Boston
- Last Command Sergeant Major: Command Sergeant Major Bryan Lynch

Insignia
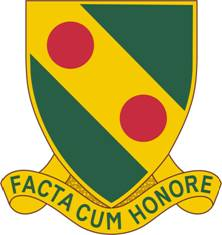
- Distinctive Unit Insignia

The 793rd Military Police Battalion was a battalion-sized unit in the United States Army stationed at Fort Richardson, Alaska. The battalion was responsible for all Regular Army Military Police units and operations in Germany and eventually in the state of Alaska.

In 1946, the battalion was located in Germany, with subordinate companies across the country. In 2010, the unit was relocated to Alaska. With the reduction of troops in the US Army, the battalion was deactivated on 28 August 2014.

== World War II ==
The battalion was activated at Camp Maxey, Texas, on 26 December 1942. The battalion deployed to Scotland in February 1944 for training prior to movement to France in August 1944, where it conducted route security operations on the Red Ball Express until December 1944. From December 1944 to June 1945 the battalion conducted port security operations in Antwerp, Belgium, and was cited in the Order of the Day by the Belgian Army. In June 1945, the battalion was assigned port security operations in Marseille, France, until January 1946, when it entered Germany. The battalion was then assigned to the 1st Infantry Division, and moved to Nuremberg, Germany, where it conducted law and order operations as part of the occupation force and security for the Nuremberg Trials. The 793rd Military Police Battalion was awarded the Meritorious Unit Commendation—European theater and campaign streamers—Northern France 1944, and Rhineland 1944–1945, for military operations in Europe during World War II.

== Gulf War ==
During the Cold War era, the battalion was assigned to VII Corps, United States Army, Europe. The 793rd Military Police Battalion deployed to Saudi Arabia in December 1990 in support of VII Corps during the Gulf War. The battalion advanced into Iraq and Kuwait in February 1991 at the start of the ground offensive in support of the 1st Armored Division, 3rd Armored Division, and the 2nd Armored Cavalry Regiment, where it conducted extensive enemy prisoner of war operations. In April 1991, the battalion supervised the evacuation of thousands of refugees from Iraq to Saudi Arabia. The 793rd Military Police Battalion was awarded the Meritorious Unit Commendation—Desert Shield/Storm and campaign streamers—Defense of Saudi Arabia, Liberation and Defense of Kuwait, and Southwest Asia Cease Fire, for military operations in Southwest Asia. The battalion redeployed from Saudi Arabia to Germany in May 1991, and was subsequently reassigned to the 18th Military Police Brigade, V Corps, United States Army, Europe.

== Bosnia and Herzegovina ==
The 793rd Military Police Battalion deployed to Bosnia and Herzegovina in December 1995 in support of Task Force Eagle (1st Armored Division) and Operation Joint Endeavor. For eleven months, soldiers of the battalion performed a wide variety of missions including battlefield circulation control, area and route security operations, VIP security, and critical site security. During the Bosnian national elections in September 1996, the battalion provided around-the-clock support to nearly 200 election sites and counting houses in the Tuzla Valley. Upon the successful transfer of military police functions to the covering force of the 1st Infantry Division in November 1996, units of the battalion redeployed to Germany, bringing an end to the second major deployment of the "Spartans" outside of Germany since 1990. The battalion was awarded the Army Superior Unit Award – for military police support and operations in Bosnia.

== Kosovo ==
The 793rd Military Police Battalion deployed to Kosovo from June 1999 to December 1999 in support of Task Force Falcon to implement the peace initiatives following the NATO-led Yugoslav Wars. They established the Camp Bondsteel Detention Facility, the first facility of its kind in Kosovo, which further became the standard model for KFOR. The 793d MP battalion returned to Kosovo in November 2000 to support Task Force Falcon, KFOR 2B, until May 2001. In October 2002, the 793d Military Police Battalion returned to Kosovo for a third tour as part of KFOR 4B and conducted operations in support of Multi-National Brigade East until August 2003.

== Iraq War ==
The 793rd Military Police Battalion deployed to Iraq in December 2004 in support of Operation Iraqi Freedom 2004–2006. The battalion secured the capitulated PMOI (People's Mujahedin of Iran)/MEK (Mujahideen-e Khalq) forces at Camp Ashraf, Iraq. The battalion also supported the 3rd Brigade Combat Team, 3rd Infantry Division in their area of operation. The battalion redeployed to its home in Bamberg, Germany, in November 2005. The 793rd Military Police Battalion was awarded the Meritorious Unit Commendation—Iraq and campaign streamer—Iraq, for military operations in support of Operation Iraqi Freedom.

== Operation Iraqi Freedom 2008–2010 ==
The 793rd Military Police Battalion once again deployed to Iraq, from April 2008 to June 2009, in support of Operation Iraqi Freedom 08-10 where they oversaw 12 subordinate units professionalizing the Iraqi Police across seven provinces in central and southern Iraq, from Baghdad to Basra, serving under the Multi-National Division (Center), Multi-National Division (South-East), and Multi-National Division (South).

=== Kuwait and Baghdad ===
The battalion was in Camp Buehring, Kuwait in April 2008. They trained in the Kuwaiti Desert and gathering intelligence of their area of responsibility for Iraq. In May 2008, the battalion had completely transferred to Camp Stryker, Victory Base Complex to relieve the outgoing battalion, the 720th MP battalion from Fort Hood, Texas. The "Spartans" were attached to their home brigade, the 18th MP Brigade "Vigilant" which was in Iraq and in charge of MP units in the Division, and the battalion was attached as well to 10th Mountain Division in Multi-National Division-Center(MND-C), and the 18th Airborne Corps in Multi-National Corps-Iraq(MNC-I). The battalion had units all over MND-C and the Polish Military Controlled Multi-National Division (Center South) (MND-CS). The battalion was mainly in charge of the units for logistical purposes, rather full operationally.

=== Basra ===
Because of the height of escalation from the Battle of Basra, the Iraqi Army and the British military needed American military assistance including military police units to assist in the conflict against the Mahdi Army, led by Muqtada Al-Sadr. Multiple units were either redeployed from their current bases to Basra, or they had their orders changed as they were on the verge of deploying to theater. The 793rd MP battalion was chosen to transfer to Basra to take full operational command of the MP units down there whose duties were security in the town, as well as training the Iraqi National Police in the area. The battalion redeployed from Baghdad to Basra on 26 December 2008; the battalion's birthday. Upon arrival, the battalion was in charge of the 21st MP Company(Airborne) from Fort Bragg, North Carolina, the 266th MP Company from Virginia, the 2228th MP Company, Louisiana Army National Guard, and a Field Artillery Battery, Charlie Battery, 1st battalion, 21st Field Artillery Regiment, 41st Fires Brigade from Fort Hood, Texas, that was performing Provisional Police work. Over time, Units were redeploying back to their home station, and the battalion gained the 178th MP Company, Georgia Army National Guard, and the 810th MP Company Army Reserve from Tampa, Florida. The battalion also took command of a camp on COB Basra and were in charge of all facilities and occupants to include 3 battalions from the British Army: one battalion from the Princess of Wales's Royal Regiment, a battalion from the Royal Tank Regiment, and a battalion from the Yorkshire Regiment. The battalion was initially under the command of 20th Armoured Brigade (United Kingdom)(The Iron Fist), British Army, and Multi-National Division-South East (MND-SE). As the British forces were pulling out of Iraq, the battalion was attached to the 2nd BCT, 4th Infantry Division and the 8th Military Police Brigade HQs and the 34th Infantry Division "Red Bull", the first National Guard Division HQ deployed to Iraq, in the newly formed, Multi-National Division-South, which combined South East with part of Center South. The battalion was relieved of duty by the provincial formed Task Force South which would take command of all MP functions and units until the 231st MP battalion, Alabama Army National Guard came to take command. The battalion returned to Bamberg, Germany at the end of June, 2009; five days short of a 16-month deployment.

== Relocation to Alaska ==
After returning from Iraq, the 793rd Military Police Battalion was chosen to be deactivated in Germany, February 2010. The 615th MP Company "Bloodhounds" (Grafenwöhr) and the 630th MP Company "Mavericks"(Bamberg, Schweinfurt) were reassigned to the 709th MP battalion "Warriors", based in Grafenwöhr. The final unit was the 212th MP Company Dragoons which was deactivated to be reactivated in Fort Bliss, Texas. The battalion was deactivated so it could be reactivated in Alaska to replace the Arctic Military Police Battalion (Provisional) "Polar Bears".

The 793rd Military Police Battalion was reactivated on 14 May 2010 in Fort Richardson, Alaska with the duties of being once again a deployable battalion command, and responsible for military police duties in Alaska. As the 4th Brigade Combat Team (Airborne), 25th Infantry Division had been using the unofficial nickname of "Spartans" at Fort Richardson, the 793rd was reactivated as the 793rd "Arctic Spartans". However, the 793rd Military Police Battalion had received the special designation of "Spartans" which was granted by the US Army Center of Military History. Due to United States Army Alaska (USARAK) being a division-sized unit, but not a division, USARAK is not authorized its own Provost Marshal; therefore, the Commander, 793rd MP battalion was the Provost Marshal for USARAK.

In 2010 the "Arctic Spartans"/472nd MP Company based out of Fort Wainwright was being deployed to the Middle East. The 545th MP Company based out of Fort Richardson returning from deployment, and the 164th MP Company, also based out of Fort Richardson began their training for their deployment to the Middle East. With Ft. Richardson and Elmendorf Air Force Base merging to create Joint Base Elmendorf-Richardson (JBER), Air Force Security Forces (Air Police) took control of law enforcement for the entire base, with the exception of a few army dog handlers.

For 64 years, until their relocation to Alaska, the battalion had not returned to the US since they left Texas in February 1944.

== Deactivation ==
Due to the reduction of the US army and its number of soldiers, the battalion was announced as being deactivated as well as some of their companies under their command. The remaining units will be reassigned to other battalions in the realignment. On 28 August 2014, the 793rd Military Police Battalion "Spartans" was inactivated and its colors were cased again. The battalion's Headquarters Detachment, the 472nd Military Police Company, and the 164th Military Police Company were symbolically inactivated during the ceremony as well. The 28th Military Police Detachment was reassigned to the 1st Striker Brigade Combat Team, 25th Infantry Division, which is located at Fort Wainwright, and the 545th Military Police Company was reassigned to the 4th Airborne Brigade Combat Team, 25th Infantry Division, which is located at Joint Base Elmendorf-Richardson. At the ceremony, the Commandant of the Military Police Corps and former commanding officer of the battalion, Brigadier General Mark Spindler announced that the battalion would eventually be reactivated "when the time comes".

== Unit insignia ==
A gold color metal and enamel device 15/32 inch (1.2 cm) in height overall consisting of a shield blazoned: vert, on a bend or two torteaux. Attached below the shield is a gold scroll inscribed "FACTA CUM HONORE" in green letters. The design on the shield, consisting of two red "balls" on a yellow "trail" surrounded by green "grass", represents the battalion's role in the Red Ball Express of World War II.

== Final units ==
=== Fort Richardson ===
Headquarters and Headquarters Detachment (HHD) "Arctic Gladiators", 793rd Military Police Battalion "Arctic Spartans" (Inactivated)

164th Military Police Company "Arctic Enforcers" (Inactivated)

545th Military Police Company "Arctic Defenders" (reassigned to 4th Brigade Combat Team (Airborne) 25th Infantry Division; reassigned to 17th Combat Sustainment Support Battalion (17th CSSB), 2016) 545th Military Police K9 Detachment "Arctic Dawgs" Most Decorated K9 Detachment in the Army

=== Fort Wainwright ===
472nd Military Police Company "Arctic Titans" (Inactivated)

28th Military Police Detachment "Arctic Guardians" (reassigned to 1st Striker Brigade Combat Team 25th Infantry Division; reassigned to 17th Combat Sustainment Support Battalion (17th CSSB), 2016)
