= 45th Sustainment Brigade =

- 45th Sustainment Brigade shoulder sleeve insignia
- Active: 1936–2015 October 2026-Present
- Country: United States
- Branch: United States Army
- Type: Sustainment brigade
- Size: Brigade
- Part of: 8th Theater Sustainment Command
- Garrison/HQ: Schofield Barracks
- Motto: Fight to Serve

Insignia
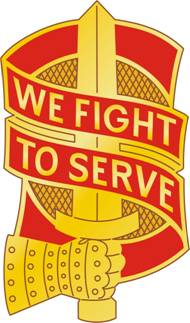
- Identification symbol

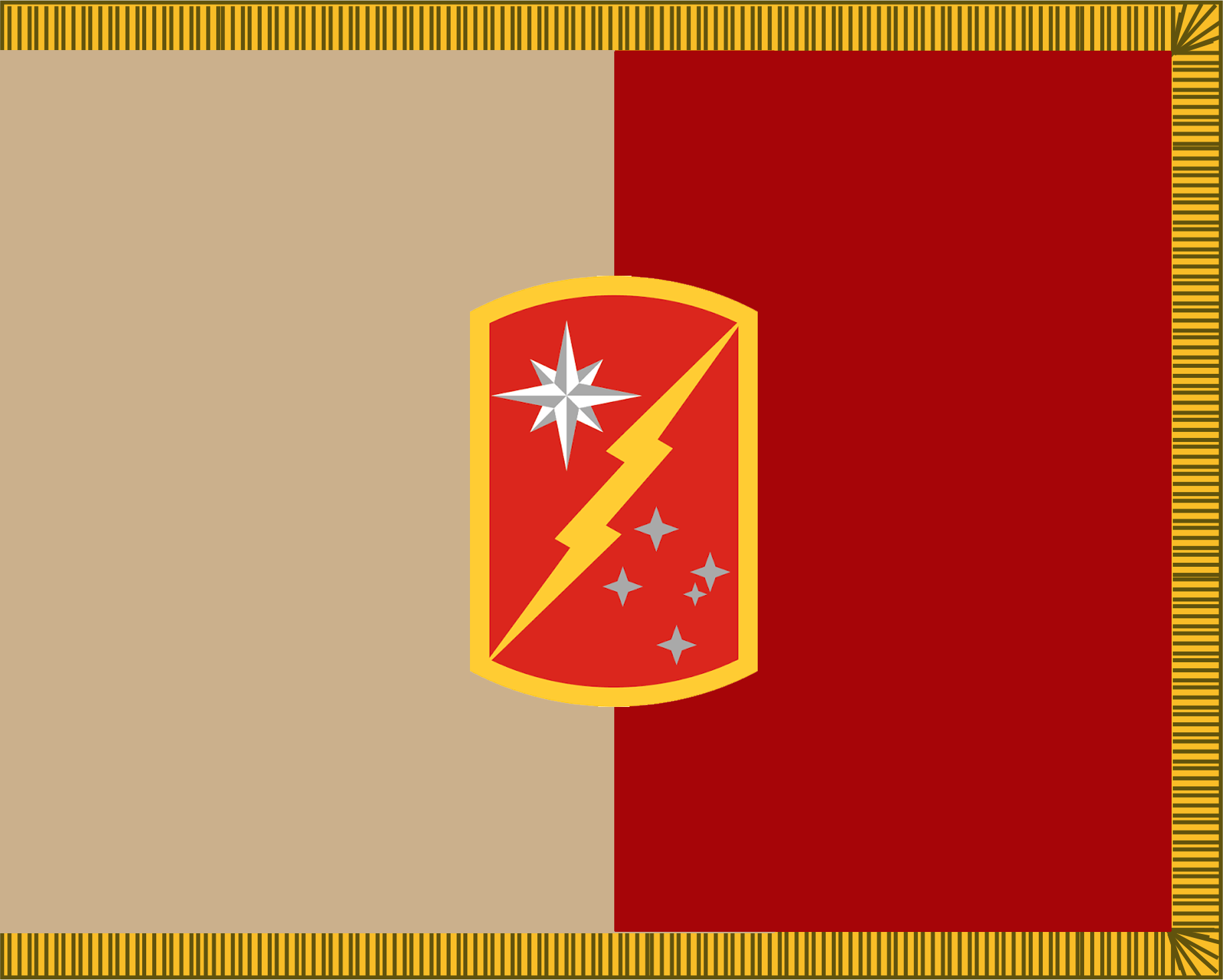
- 45th Sustainment Brigade Flag

The 45th Sustainment Brigade was a sustainment brigade of the United States Army based at Schofield Barracks, Hawaii. The 45th SB was directly subordinate to the 8th Theater Sustainment Command until 2015 when the Army aligned sustainment brigades to major divisions. The 45th SB was then re-designated to the 25th Sustainment Brigade, with the 25th Infantry Division obtaining complete administrative and operational control.

== Organization ==
The 45th Sustainment Brigade is composed of a Headquarters and Headquarters Company and 3 battalions.

- Headquarters and Headquarters Company (HHC)
- Special Troops Battalion (STB)
- 524th Combat Service Support Battalion (524th CSSB)
- 125th Finance Battalion

== History ==
The 45th Sustainment Brigade was originally constituted on 1 May 1936, in the Regular Army as the 45th Quartermaster Regiment (Truck). It was initially activated on 9 May 1942, at the Oakland Sub-Port of Embarkation (of the SF Port of Embarkation), California, as the 45th Quartermaster Truck Regiment.

Elements of the regiment separated on 1 December 1943, and received new destinations. The Headquarters and Headquarters Detachment became HHD, 45th Quartermaster Group. The Headquarters and Headquarters Detachment, 1st, 2nd and 3rd Battalions (Mobile) respectively, Companies A through M were re-designated as the 346 1st through 247 2dd Quartermaster Truck Companies. The Headquarters and Headquarters Detachment, 45th Quartermaster Group, then deactivated at Camp Kilmer, New Jersey, on 26 November 1945.

On 30 March 1966, the group was designated as Headquarters and Headquarters Company, 45th Support Group. Activation followed on 4 May 1966, at Fort Lee, Virginia. The group was deactivated on 15 December 1970, at Fort Lewis, Washington.

On 15 September 1972 the 45th Support Group saw its latest activation at Fort Shafter, Hawaii. In August 1986, Headquarters 45th Support Group took command of the 7th Maintenance Battalion, the 124th Transportation Battalion, the 84th Engineer Battalion (Combat Heavy), the 29th Engineer Battalion (Topographic) and the 125th Finance Battalion.

On 16 October 1993, the 45th Support Group was re-designated as the 45th Corps Support Group (Forward), the 7th Maintenance Battalion was re-designated as the 17th Corps Support Battalion, and the 124th Transportation Battalion was re-designated as the 524th Corps Support Battalion. Other subordinate units consisted of the 84th Engineer Battalion, 125th Finance Battalion, and the 29th Engineer Battalion.

The 45th Corps Support Group (Forward) was re-designated at the 45th Sustainment Brigade on 11 January 2006 in conjunction with the Army's Transformation Campaign Plan with assigned units of a Special Troops Battalion (STB), the 524th Support Battalion (Corps) and the 17th Support Battalion (Corps).

On 7 July 2006, the 45th Sustainment Brigade deployed to Q-West, Iraq in support of Operation Iraqi Freedom. A milestone was achieved when command authority was transferred from one sustainment brigade to another in a Transfer of Authority ceremony on 29 August 2006. This marked the first example of such a transfer in the history of the United States Army. The brigade was relieved of its duties by the 3rd Sustainment Brigade on 26 June 2007.

In January 2009, the 45th Sustainment Brigade deployed to Afghanistan in support of Operation Enduring Freedom.

In January 2012, the 45th Sustainment Brigade deployed once again to Afghanistan in support of Operation Enduring Freedom.

On 30 June 2015, the 45th Sustainment Brigade was redesignated as the 25th Sustainment Brigade, 25th Infantry Division. The last commander of the 45th Sustainment Brigade was Colonel Gregory G. Boyd.

On October 16th 2026, Tenth Support Group was deactivated and the 45th Sustaintment Brigade was reactivated on Torri Station in Okinawa, Japan.

== Honors ==
=== Campaign streamers ===
Conflict	Streamer	Year(s)
Iraq War	Operation Iraqi Freedom IV	2006–2007
Afghanistan War	Operation Enduring Freedom	2009–2010
Afghanistan War	Operation Enduring Freedom	2012–2012
