= Busan Citizens Park =

Park in Busan, South Korea

Coordinates: 35°10′00″N 129°3′24″E

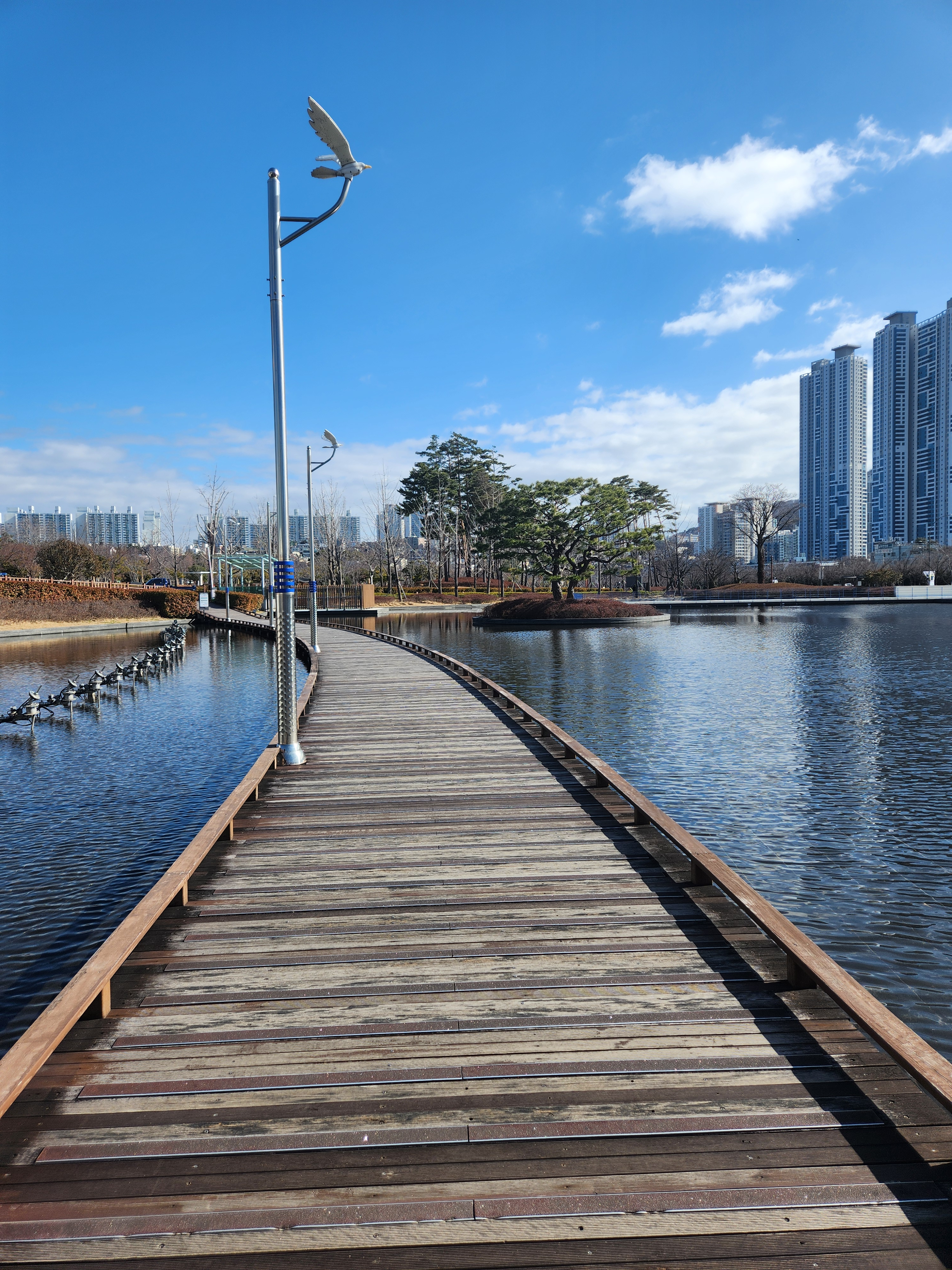
- View from walkway in the park (2024)
- Interactive map of Busan Citizens Park
- Location: Busanjin District, Busan, South Korea
- Established: 1 May 2014

Busan Citizens Park (Korean: 부산시민공원) is a public park in Busanjin District, Busan, South Korea.

It was formerly an Imperial Japanese Army (IJA) base and United States Army camp (Camp Hialeah). The camp occupying a 133-acre (540,000 m^{2}) site was closed on 10 August 2006 and returned to the Busan Metropolitan Government. It was redeveloped under its current name and opened on 1 May 2014.

== History ==
During the Japanese occupation of Korea, a horse racing track encircling the main area of the IJA camp was owned by the Chōsen Racing Association. A visiting American sailor is purported to have named the camp after the Hialeah Park Race Track in Hialeah, Florida.

The area served as the IJA headquarters in Busan until the surrender of Japan.

=== United States Army occupation ===
U.S. troops took command of Camp Hialeah on 17 September 1945 and remained until the end of 1948 when control of the installation passed to the U.S. Consulate and the United Nations (U.N.).

Busan was a critical strategic and logistical staging area during the Korean War. By 5 September 1950, the Korean People's Army held most of the Korean peninsula, except for the U.N. forces beachhead around the Pusan Perimeter. Busan port facilities were under the control of the U.S. military to handle the enormous support requirements of the fighting forces, with the 8069th Replacement Depot operating Camp Hialeah. After the Korean Armistice Agreement was signed on 27 July 1953, most of the Busan port facilities were turned over to the ROK government.

Since the Korean War, Camp Hialeah was organised under different commands and missions. They included the 8069th Replacement Depot, the Korean Communications Zone, Busan Military Post, Busan Sub Area Command, Busan Area Command, Busan Base Command, 2nd Transportations Group, Busan Support Activity, U.S. Army Garrison-Busan, 34th, and 20th Support Groups, and 19th Theater Area Command, Area IV, 20th Area Support Group.

Camp Hialeah was a primary receiving point for materiel, equipment, supplies, and goods to U.S. Army bases in the Republic of Korea and was one of the primary Non-combatant Evacuation Operations (NEO) routes for U.S. personnel in and out of the Republic of Korea. Camp Hialeah supported tenant units that included:

- 142nd Quartermaster Battalion now designated the 142nd Combat Sustainment Support Battalion
- Busan Storage Facility, the largest (cold) storage facility within U.S. Forces Korea for supplies and goods to commissaries and exchanges Korea-wide
- 61st Chemical Company
- 552nd Military Police Company
- 4th Quartermaster Detachment (Airborne).

Other tenant activities supported by Camp Hialeah included personnel of Air Force units at the Combat Ready Contingency Hospital,

- 25th Transportation Battalion
- Communications unit and the AMC Terminal at Gimhae Air Base
- 837th Transport Battalion
- Transportation Motor Pool
- Defense Contract Management Command-Gimhae
- Military Sealift Command Operations, US Navy
- 74th Signal Company
- Defense Reutilization Management Operations
- Chejudo Recreation Center
- 72nd Ordnance Company; C. Company
- 168th Medical Battalion
- 106th Medical Detachment
- Criminal Investigations Division
- Navy Office of Special Investigations
- USAF Office of Special Investigations
- 665th Medical (Dental) Detachment
- 524th Military Intelligence Battalion
- 1st Signal Brigade
- 154th Medical Detachment.
- American Forces Korean Network, Pusan (Armed Forces Radio and Television Service)

At its peak, the Camp and its associated facilities had a population of 2,500 U.S. military and Department of Defense civilian employees.

=== Return to Busan Government ===
Originally, the Camp was distant from residential areas, but as the city of Busan grew it eventually surrounded the Camp. Under the guidelines of the U.S.–South Korea Status of Forces Agreement (SOFA), comparable facilities that comply with U.S. standards and infrastructure are required to ensure quality of life for U.S. soldiers and families prior to installation relocation. On 1 June 2005, pursuant to the Amended Land Partnership Plan between the U.S. and the Republic of Korea, it was announced that Camp Hialeah would close. The last units to leave the installation were the 72nd Ordnance Company and 6th Korean Service Corps Company, which were reassigned on the Korean Peninsula; while the 552nd Military Police Company, 4th Quartermaster Detachment (Airborne) and the 61st Chemical Company relocated to Schofield Barracks, Hawaii, Alaska and Fort Lewis, Washington, respectively. On 10 August 2006 Camp Hialeah was formally returned to Busan Metropolitan City. The US and South Korean governments disagreed over the issue of environmental cleanup of the Camp and this delayed its redevelopment by four years until it was agreed that South Korea would meet the cleanup costs. The Camp was open to the public from 24 April to 30 September, 2010 before closing for redevelopment.

=== Busan Citizens Park ===
The site was redeveloped as Busan Citizens Park with five themes and 29 separate attractions. The Park opening was delayed due to the discovery of environmental contamination in 3 areas of the site. The Park was opened to the public on 1 May 2014. Several of the Park buildings are refurbished military base buildings including several Quonset huts.

== See also ==
- List of United States Army installations in South Korea
- Children's Grand Park, Busan
