= Children's Grand Park, Busan =

Park complex in Busan, South Korea

Children's Grand Park
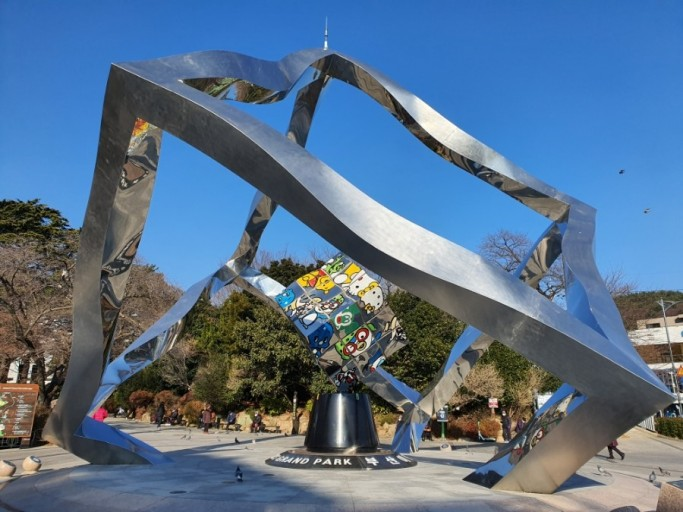
- Statue in the park (2022)
- Location: Choeup-dong, Busanjin District, Busan, South Korea
- Coordinates: 35.1825°N 129.0467°E

Children's Grand Park (Korean: 어린이대공원) is a park complex in Choeup-dong, Busanjin District, Busan, South Korea. Facilities at the Children's Grand Park include hills and hiking trails, Zoo, gardens, a lake and streams, observation tower and an amusement park.

== Public transportation ==
Busan Metro Line 1 or Busan Metro Line 2, Seomyeon Station (Exit 2) → Bus 63, 81, 83-1, 133, 54 → Children’s Park

== See also ==
- Busan Citizens Park
