= Camp Colbern =

Former U.S Army installation

Coordinates: 37.514726°N 127.227361°E

Camp Colbern, in Hanam-shi near Seoul, Republic of Korea, was a U.S. Army installation and the home of the 304th Signal Battalion. It closed in late 2005, with the move of the 304th to Camp Stanley, Republic of Korea. Also, the land was returned in 2006 to ROK. Camp Colbern existed for 41 years, with the 304th occupying the Camp for 3 of those decades.
