= 57th Transportation Battalion (United States) =

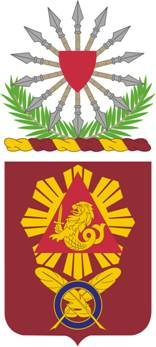
- 57th Transportation Battalion coat of arms
- Active: 16 October 1999 – 15 September 2011
- Country: United States
- Branch: United States Army
- Type: Transportation Battalion
- Role: Transportation
- Size: Battalion
- Part of: 593rd Sustainment Brigade, I Corps, Forces Command (FORSCOM)
- Garrison/HQ: Fort Lewis
- Nickname: Gallant Spartans (Special Designation)
- Motto: Providing With Mobility
- Colors: Brick Red and Gold
- Decorations: Meritorious Unit Commendation Streamer embroidered VIETNAM 1968–1970, Philippine Presidential Unit Citation Streamer embroidered 17 OCTOBER 1944 TO 4 JULY 1945 (as 57th Quartermaster Battalion)

Commanders
- Battalion Commander: LTC John McCoy
- Command Sergeant Major: CSM Kenneth Blasko

Insignia
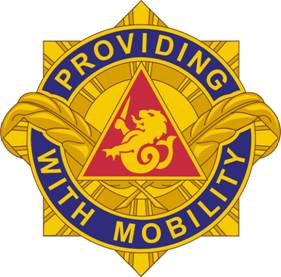
- Distinctive Unit Insignia

The 57th Transportation Battalion ("Gallant Spartans") is a transportation battalion of the United States Army.

== History ==
It was constituted 1 May 1936 in the Regular Army as Headquarters and Headquarters Detachment, 2nd Battalion, 26th Quartermaster Regiment. Throughout its history it has been credited with one campaign participation credit for World War II, 14 campaigns during the Vietnam War, and two in the war on terror. Underwent numerous designation changes to its present activation as the 57th Transportation BN, stationed at Fort Lewis, Washington. It consists of a Headquarters Company, the 265th Movement Control Team, the 355 Terminal Supervision Detachment, the 21st Cargo Transfer Company, the 140th Movement Control Team, and three truck companies, namely the 40th Transportation Company, the 497th Transportation Company, and the 513th Transportation Company. The 57th Transportation Battalion officially inactivated on 15 September 2011 at Fort Lewis, Washington.

== 40th Transportation Company ==
Stationed in Mannheim, Germany on Grenadier Strasse at an ex-Wehrmacht kasserne designated Turley Barracks by the U. S., the 40th Transportation Company (Medium Truck, Petroleum) operated during the Cold War in general support of 7th Army. The Company had previously been awarded the Presidential Unit Citation. The unit was assigned to the 6th Quartermaster Battalion, also headquartered in the Mannheim area. The 40th's T. O. & E. included 60ea 5 ton tractors and 120ea 5,000 gallon semi-trailers, which enabled the unit to perform shuttle operations, dropping a full trailer and pulling away an empty to be refilled. In addition to providing fuel support to combat units involved in field operations, the unit supplied fuel from tank farms to various fuel stations and military airfields in the 7th Army operating area of Western Europe. During 1963 and 1964 the unit was commanded by 1LT John Clifford, 1LT John Stanford and 1LT John Logan. During Stanford's tour the unit achieved the highest rating of all units in 7th Army for Annual General Inspection. Stanford, a U. S. Army Airborne Ranger, went on to qualify as an aviator who flew Mohawk aircraft on missions in Viet Nam. Ultimately he commanded the Military Transportation Management Command and finally retired as a Major General.

== 21st Cargo Transfer Company ==
The 21st CTC was constituted in 1926 as the 13th Motorcycle company, Then re-designated as Company "A" of the 72nd Separate Quartermaster Battalion in 1936, and began training to head out to support the Allied Forces in World War II. The company supported the war effort in Rome-Arno, and Po Valley, until they were disbanded in 1940. (though the unit designation was changed several times in this span). The unit was reactivated at Camp Bowie as the 21st Quartermaster Company on 12 June 1941. Over the next decade the company was re-designated many times until they were finally re-designated on 21 July 1947 as the 21st Transportation Car Company, at which point they began preparing for operations in the Korean theater. The company was one of the first transportation units sent to Korea, and they remained there until well after the war as an occupation force. 21st took part in many missions throughout the war, and received 8 streamers for their contributions. The unit was disbanded once again in Korea on 15 June 1998. On 16 June 2001, the 21st Transportation Company was activated on Fort Lewis, and later re-designated the 21st Cargo Transfer Company. Since 2001, the unit has deployed in support of Operation Enduring Freedom, Operation Iraqi Freedom in Iraq and the global war on terrorism in Kuwait. The 21st Transportation Company is currently aligned under the 13th CSSB, Fort Lewis, Washington.

The company's decorations include the Meritorious Unit Commendation (Army), Streamer embroidered KOREA 1950–1951, Meritorious Unit Commendation (Army), Streamer embroidered KOREA 1951–1952, Republic of Korea Presidential Unit Citation, Streamer embroidered KOREA 1951–1952, and the Republic of Korea Presidential Unit Citation, Streamer embroidered KOREA 1952–1953.
