= 8th Theater Sustainment Command =

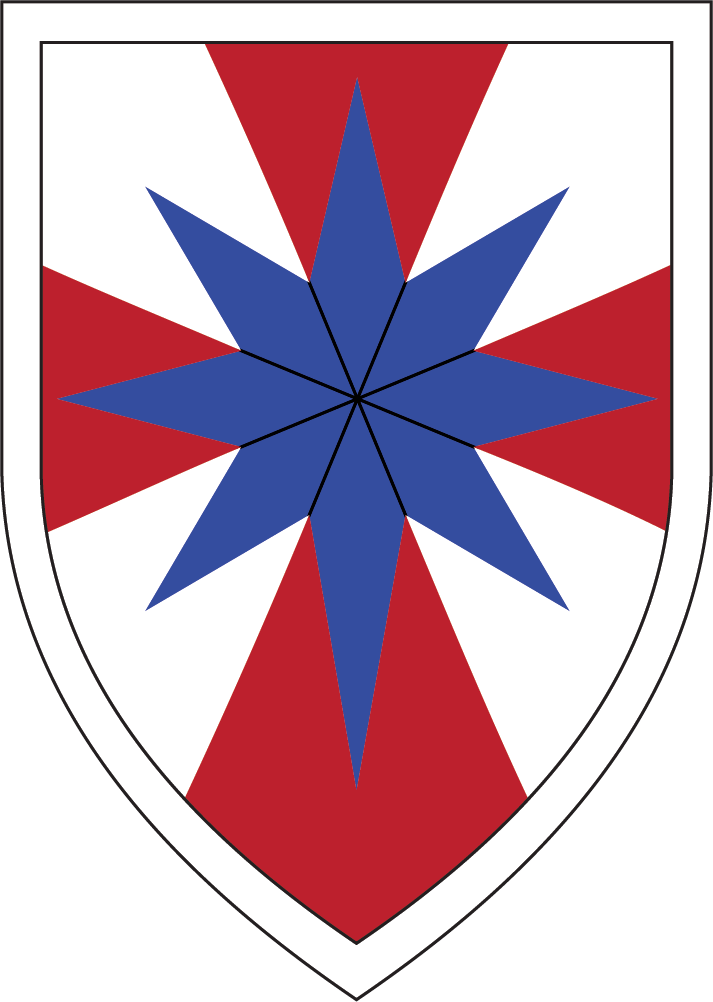
- Shoulder Sleeve Insignia (SSI)
- Active: 2006–present
- Country: United States
- Branch: United States Army
- Part of: United States Army Pacific
- Garrison/HQ: Fort Shafter, Hawaii
- Nickname: 8th TSC
- Motto: Sustain the Force!

Commanders
- Current commander: MG Frederick L. Crist

Insignia
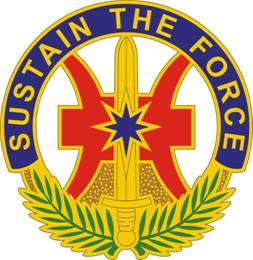
- Distinctive unit insignia

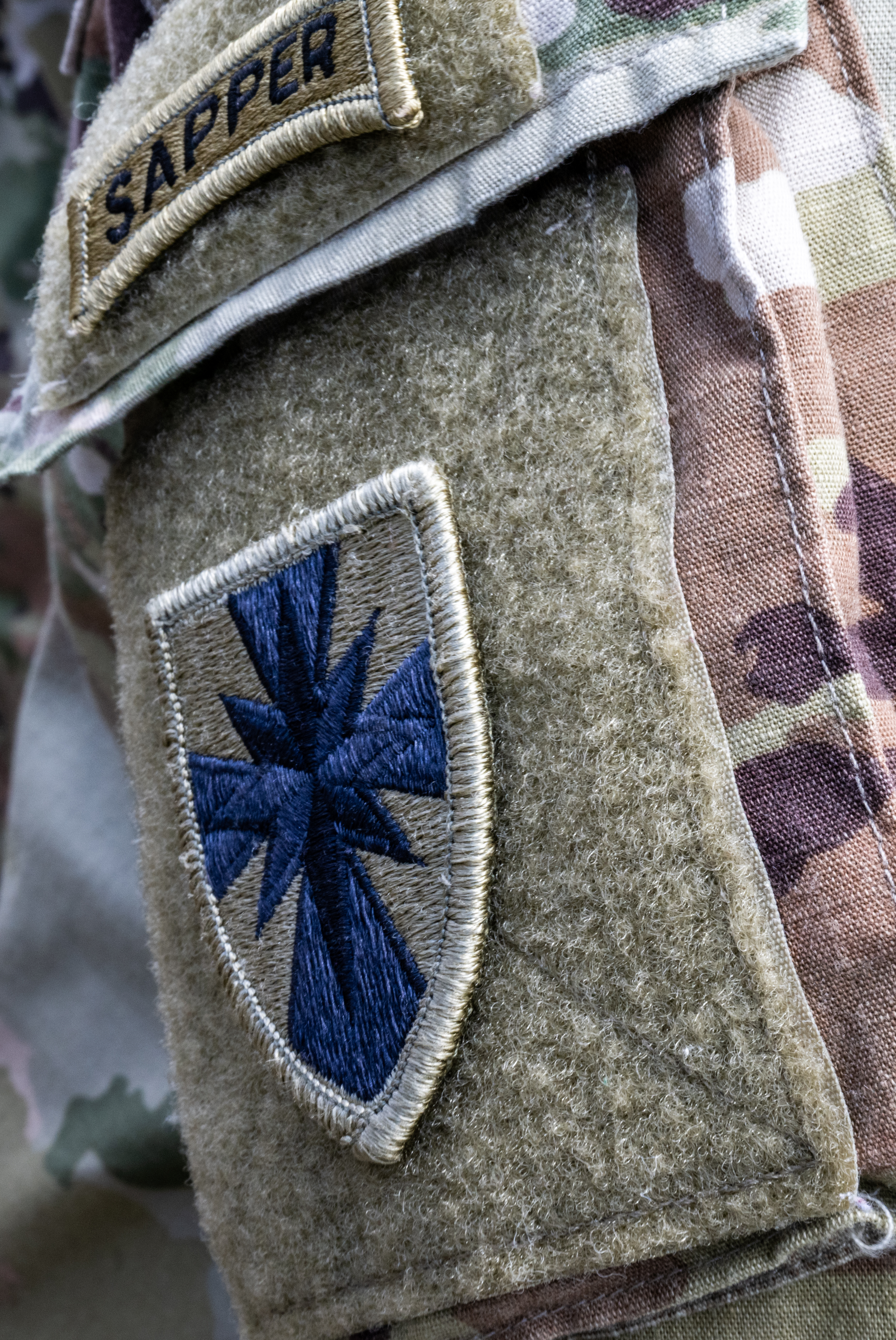
- Subdued version of the 8th Theater Sustainment Command's SSI

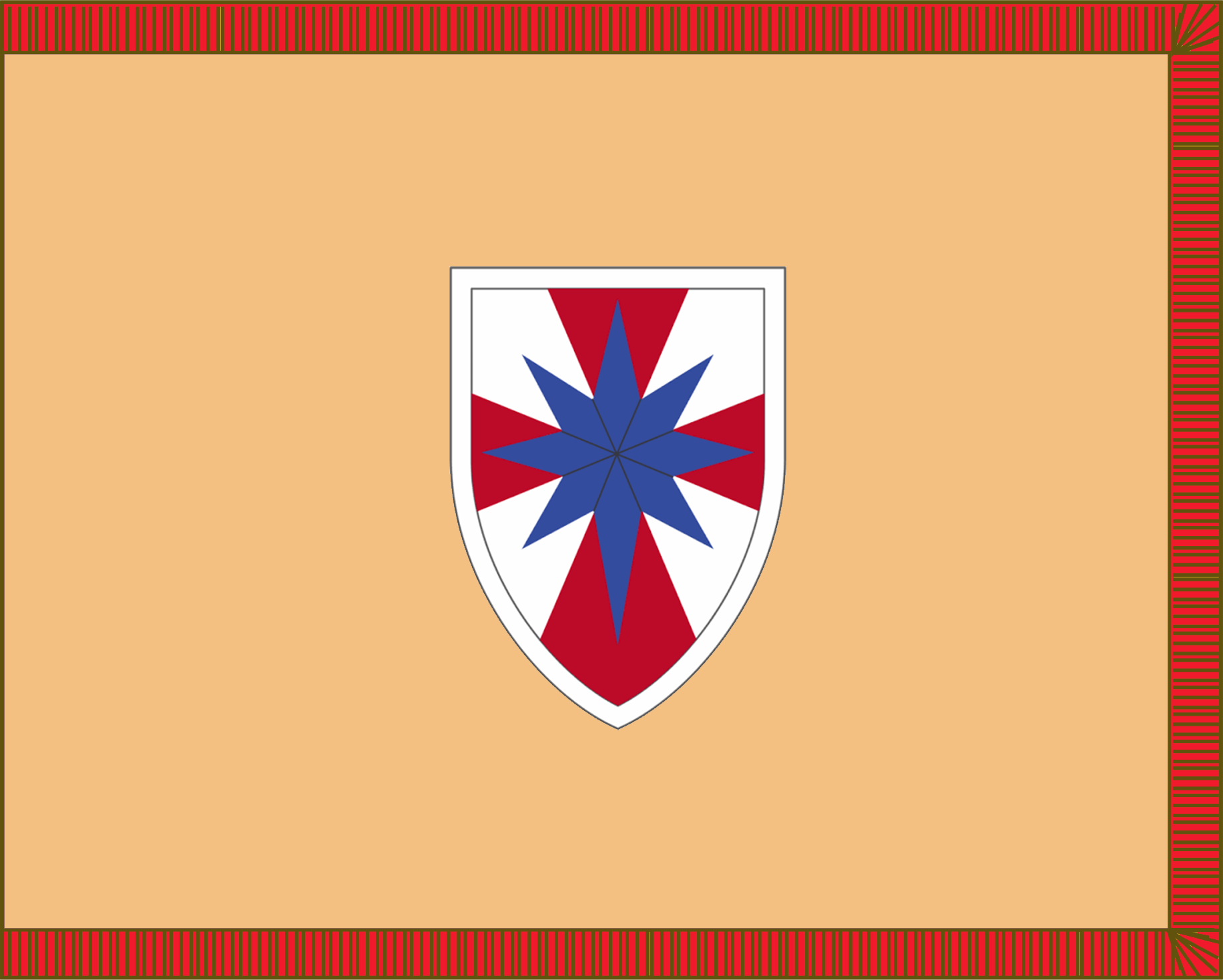
- 8th Sustainment Command Flag

The 8th Theater Sustainment Command (8th TSC), as the senior Army logistics command in the United States Pacific Command's Area of Responsibility (AOR), provides command and control of all assigned and attached and units under its operational control (OPCON); trains, equips and tailors forces, as required; plans and generates expeditionary combat support/combat service support (CS/CSS) capability; and provides timely and robust support of joint and combined forces across the full spectrum of military operations in order to maintain peace and stability, deter aggression, and fight and win in the Pacific AOR.

== Subordinate units ==
8th Theater Sustainment Command

- 8th Special Troops Battalion
- 8th Military Police Brigade
- 130th Engineer Brigade
- 175th Financial Management Support Center
- separate rigging, Logistics Support Vessel, and dive assets

== Command group ==
- Commanding General: MG Gavin J. Gardner
- Command Sergeant Major: CSM Brian J. Morrison
- Deputy Commanding Officer: COL Todd C. Hanks

== History ==
=== 8th Theater Sustainment Command ===
The Headquarters, Headquarters Company and Special Troops, 8th Field Army Support Command (8th FASCOM) was constituted on 5 February 1968, and activated on 1 March 1968 in Korea. Field Army Support Commands provided logistical support to the Field Army units of Vietnam, as the Army recognized the need for a centralized logistics organization. The unit was inactivated on 21 June 1971 at Fort Lewis, Washington, and was re-designated on 14 April 2005 as the Headquarters and Headquarters Company, 8th Theater Sustainment Command. The former 45th Corps Support Group was inactivated on 11 January 2006 and reorganized as the 8th Theater Sustainment Command (Provisional).

=== 130th Theater Engineer Brigade ===
The 130th Theater Engineer Brigade was originally constituted in the U.S. Army as the 1303rd Engineer General Service Regiment and activated on 15 July 1943 at Camp Ellis, Illinois. The regiment has WWII campaign credits for Normandy, Northern France, Rhineland, Ardennes-Alsace, Central Europe and the Asian-Pacific theatre. The regiment was deactivated on 8 July 1955 and its elements allocated to the regular Army. It was re-designated as Headquarters and Headquarters Company, 130th Engineer Aviation Brigade in Japan and subsequently inactivated on 25 June 1956.

On 16 June 1969, Headquarters and Headquarters Company, 130th Engineer Aviation Brigade was re-designated as Headquarters and Headquarters Company, 130th Engineer Brigade and activated in Pioneer Kaserne, Hanau, Germany. From December 1995 to January 1996 all units in the brigade, except the 320th Engineer Company (Topographic), deployed to Croatia or Bosnia and Herzegovina in support of Operation Joint Endeavor. In December 1995, the 502nd Engineer Company deployed to Zupanja, Croatia and placed the historic ribbon bridge over the Sava River.

Units of the 130th Theater Engineer Brigade were deployed to Kuwait in early 2003 and moved into Iraq in March where they supported Operation Iraqi Freedom with bridging and infrastructure support. Brigade units redeployed to Hanau in late 2003 and early 2004. The brigade deployed to Iraq again in September 2005.

The 130th Theater Engineer Brigade said goodbye to Hanau, casing its colors on Pioneer Kaserne on 4 May 2007. The brigade headquarters became part of U.S. Army Pacific on 16 June 2007. The 130th Engineer Brigade stood up in Hawaii on 23 October 2008.

=== 8th Military Police Brigade ===
Military Police (MP) in Korea trace their roots back to the Korean War. They fought the enemy behind the lines and protected vital roads, installations, equipment, and supplies. In September 1984, all non-divisional MP units became members of the 8th Military Police Brigade (Provisional). Leaders recognized that if there were ever again a war in Korea, it would be necessary for all military police units to be put together in order to perform their wartime mission.

The 8th MP Brigade was officially activated on 11 April 1996 to provide command and control for the 728th Military Police Battalion and the 94th Military Police Battalion in armistice and to serve as the theater military police brigade during hostilities. The Vietnam-era 8th MP Group was reactivated as the 8th Military Police Brigade.

Currently, the 8th Military Police Brigade consists of two battalions: the 303rd Explosive Ordnance Battalion and the 728th Military Police Battalion. Soldiers of the Brigade today continue the traditions of the past in providing MP and EOD support to the theater in armistice, war, operations other than war and to "Assist, Protect and Defend" military, civilian and family members.

=== 10th Support Group ===
With the return of Okinawa to Japanese administration in May 1972, U.S. Army Base Command, Okinawa, was established as a major subordinate command of the U.S. Army, Japan. Army Base Command provided administration and support to Army units on Okinawa. As U.S. Army missions on Okinawa were further reduced, the base command was reorganized as U.S. Army Garrison, Okinawa (USAGO). The headquarters was relocated and consolidated from Zukeran into Makiminato service area. Again, on 1 October 1978, the command was reorganized as U.S. Army Support Activity, and its administration headquarters were further centralized at Camp Kinser. Another reorganization took place on 25 September 1979, changing its designation back to the U.S. Army Garrison, Okinawa U.S. Army Garrison, Okinawa (USAGO) and was officially re-designated the 10th Area Support Group (Provisional). During this timeframe, the headquarters was transferred to its present location at Torii Station. The provisional status was dropped 16 October 1987. The 10th Support Group serves as the installation command for all Army organizations on Okinawa and provides contingency support to deployed/employed forces in the Pacific Rim.
