= 18th Military Police Brigade =

- 18th Military Police Brigade Shoulder Sleeve Insignia
- Founded: 23 March 1966
- Country: United States
- Branch: United States Army
- Role: Military Police
- Size: Brigade
- Part of: 21st Theater Sustainment Command
- Garrison/HQ: Vilseck, Germany
- Motto: Ever Vigilant
- Engagements: Vietnam War; Operation Desert Storm; Operation Iraqi Freedom

Commanders
- Commanding officer: Col. Richard D. Stearns

Insignia
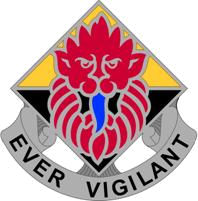
- Distinctive unit insignia

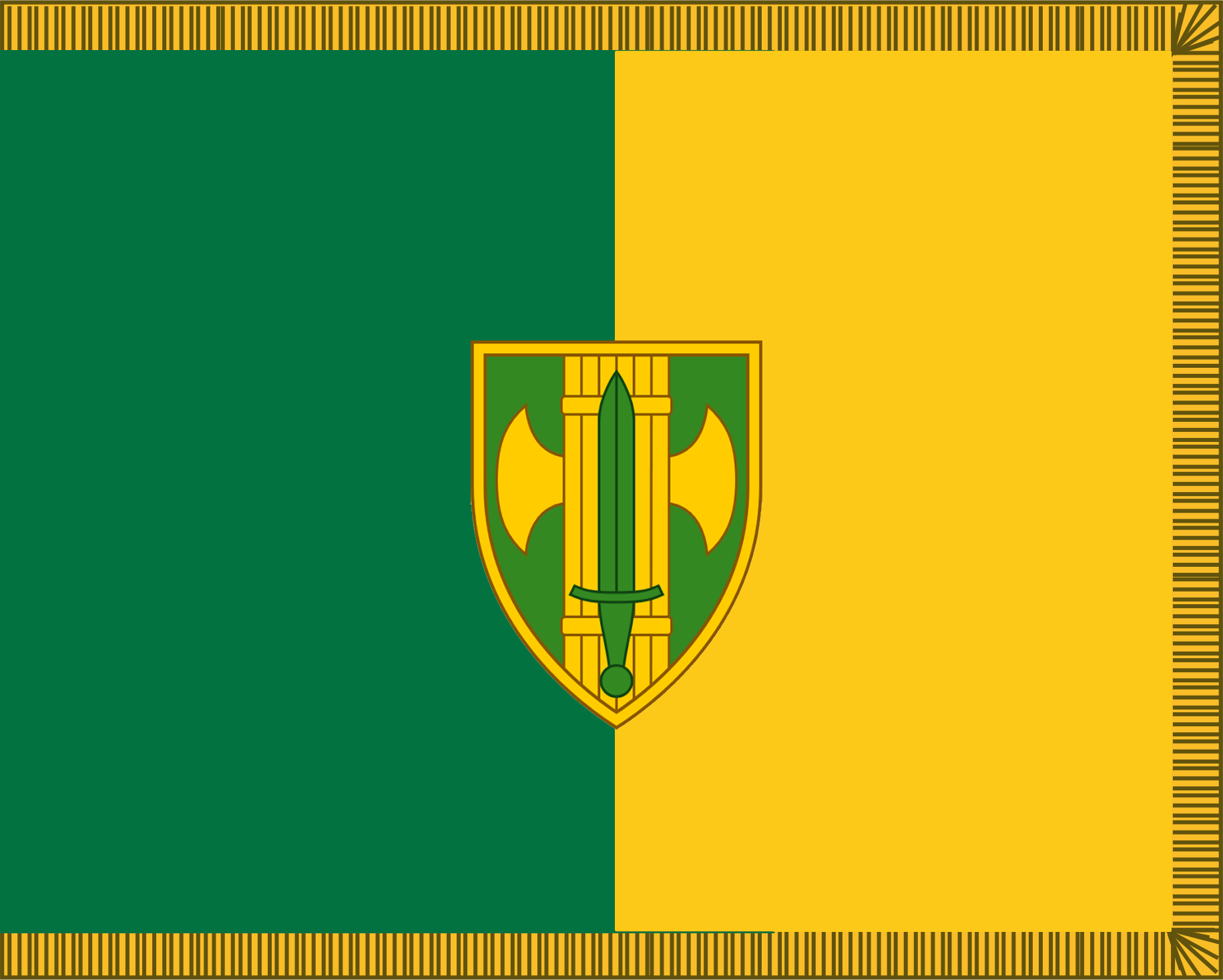
- 18th Military Police Brigade Flag

The 18th Military Police Brigade is a military police brigade of the United States Army based in Vilseck, Germany, with subordinate battalions and companies stationed throughout Germany. It provides law enforcement and force protection duties to United States Army Europe.

Activated during the Vietnam War, the Brigade oversaw all Military Police operations in the country for a large portion of the conflict, undertaking a wide variety of missions throughout the country and providing command and control for other military police groups in the region. After Vietnam, the Brigade deployed units to several other operations, namely Operation Desert Storm and Operation Provide Comfort. The brigade itself also deployed to Kosovo, supporting many of the units operating there attempting to settle unrest in the area due to the 1999 Kosovo War.

The brigade has also seen multiple deployments in the global war on terrorism to the Iraq War. Its primary responsibilities have been to train and equip the national Iraqi Police forces.

== Organization 2023 ==
The 18th Military Police Brigade is assigned to the 21st Theater Sustainment Command of United States Army Europe. The brigade is headquartered in Vilseck, Germany. The brigade consists of the following units:

- 709th Military Police Battalion, Vilseck
  - 92nd Military Police Company, Kaiserslautern
  - 527th Military Police Company, Hohenfels; Ansbach; Grafenwöhr
  - 529th Military Police Company (Honor guard), Wiesbaden
  - 554th Military Police Company, Stuttgart
  - 615th Military Police Company, in Vilseck

The Brigade is modular in nature, allowing it to take on additional units when deployed. Normally the Brigade only deploys with its Headquarters and Headquarters Company (HHC); organic battalions and companies normally don't deploy with the HHC.

== History ==
=== Vietnam War ===
Members of the Headquarters and Headquarters detachment deployed to Vũng Tàu, South Vietnam on 7 September 1966.

On 26 September 1966, the Brigade assumed operational control over all non-divisional military police units in South Vietnam. The Brigade was composed of three major subordinate elements; the 16th Military Police Group at Nha Trang, and the 89th Military Police Group and 8th Military Police Group (Criminal Investigation) at Long Binh.

The 16th and 89th Military Police Groups were composed of seven military police battalions, containing a mixture of military police and infantry companies. The units were stationed throughout every corps tactical zone, ranging from Da Nang in the north to Soc Trang in the south. The total strength of the Brigade numbered more than 5,000 personnel.

Members of the Brigade performed a wide variety of missions including evacuation of prisoners of war, security of vessels and ports, convoy escort, security of vital installations and VIPs, maintenance of discipline, law and order and direct support to combat operations. During the Tet Offensive, the 716th Military Police Battalion fought off a resolute Viet Cong unit determined to take over the US Embassy, while other 18th Brigade units performed similar duties in the Mekong Delta, Bien Hoa and the Central Highlands. The Brigade completed its service in Vietnam and was deactivated on 20 March 1973 in Oakland, California.

=== Cold War era ===
The Brigade was redesignated on 16 August 1985 as Headquarters and Headquarters Company, 18th Military Police Brigade and activated in Frankfurt, West Germany. During 1990–1991, battalions from the Brigade deployed to support VII Corps in Operation Desert Shield and Operation Desert Storm, and V Corps in Operation Provide Comfort. Elements of the Brigade have also deployed to support Operation Provide Promise and Operation Joint Endeavor in the former Yugoslavia.

Demonstrating its rapid deployability and ability to support V Corps and United States Army Europe contingency operations, every unit within the 18th Military Police Brigade deployed to the Balkans in 1999. The 92nd Military Police Company, followed by the 527th Military Police Company deployed to Sarajevo, Bosnia to provide security in support of SFOR. The 615th Military Police Company deployed to Albania in April in support of Task Force Hawk. The Headquarters and Headquarters Detachment, 793rd Military Police Battalion and 127th and 630th Military Police Companies deployed in July to Kosovo in support of Task Force Falcon. The Headquarters and Headquarters Company, 18th Military Police Brigade deployed in July to Sarajevo in support of Task Force Summit. The HHD, 709th Military Police Battalion and 92nd and 212th Military Police Company deployed in November to Kosovo in support of Task Force Falcon. While in Kosovo, the battalions were the first ever Military Police battalions to conduct joint peacekeeping operations in general support of Russian, Greek, Jordanian, and Polish maneuver battalions.

=== Global War on Terrorism ===
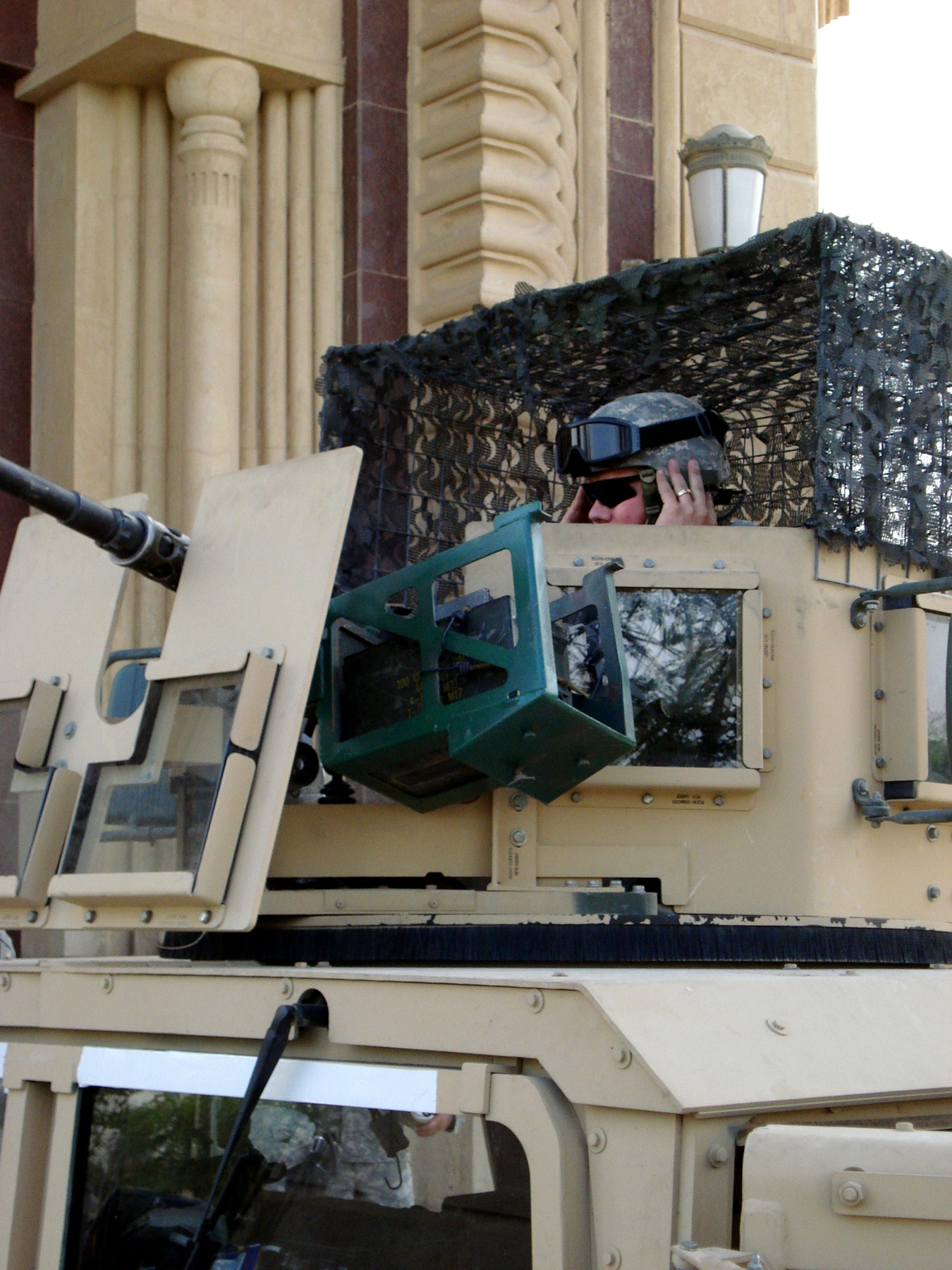
An MP prepares a defensive position in a Humvee.

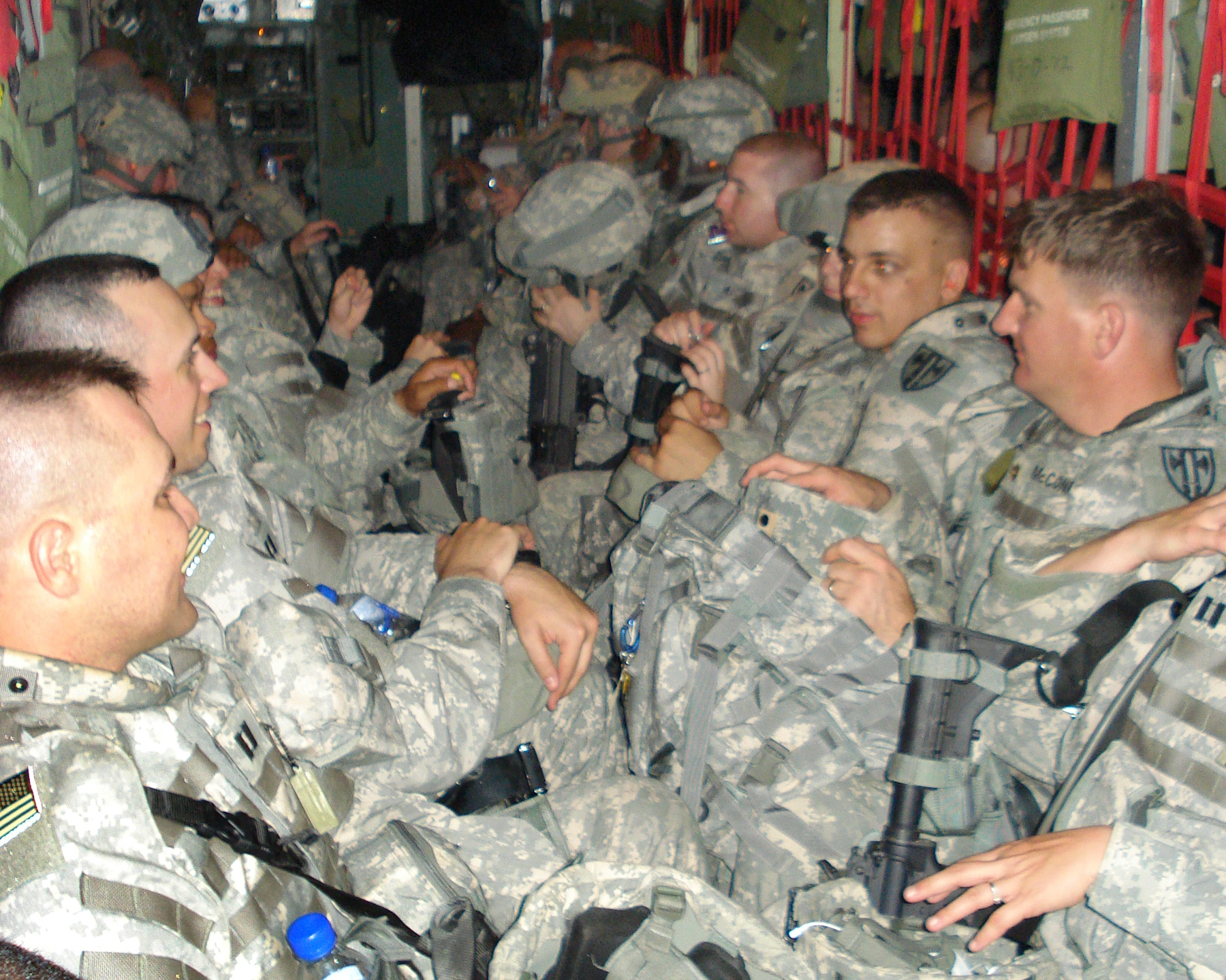
Soldiers of the brigade en route to their 2007 deployment to Iraq, October 2007.

Sergeant from the 18th MP Brigade in Germany, February 2026.

In support of Operation Iraqi Freedom I, the 18th Military Police Brigade crossed into Iraq on 22 March 2003. During its year of deployment, the brigade established Prisoner of War holding areas for over 3,600 Iraqi prisoners and conducted main supply route patrolling over 2,500 kilometers in southern Iraq. The Brigade entered Baghdad in April 2003 and began establishing the new Iraqi Police Service and rebuilding Iraqi police stations. From the beginning of Operation Iraqi Freedom until February 2004 the Brigade provided command and control for seven Military Police battalions, one Mechanized Infantry battalion, 30 Military Police companies, and two Law and Order detachments. The Brigade's MPs conducted over 24,000 combat patrols, apprehended over 2,400 criminals, confiscated 7,500 illegal weapons, and trained over 10,000 Iraqi police officers. During their deployment, the Brigade recovered several precious artifacts, such as the Mask of Warka, which was recovered on 23 September 2003. The brigade returned to Sandhofen in 2004 only to return to Iraq in 2007.

The 127th and 630th Military Police Companies began serving in Iraq in support of Operation Iraqi Freedom II in mid-2007. The 127th Company served in Iskandariyah, on patrol operations with local police. In November 2007 the Headquarters and Headquarters Company of the brigade and the 793rd Military Police Battalion deployed to Iraq in support of Operation Iraqi Freedom III. The brigade replaced the 89th Military Police Brigade which was assigned there previously. The transition ceremony for this command was held on 30 October as 100 soldiers from the brigade's headquarters took charge of the 89th's area of responsibility. They deployed to the Baghdad area, and took responsibility for the training of the Iraqi Police. The brigade is supporting Iraqi police logistics, personnel management, maintenance, budget, operations, training, leadership and judicial integration. Other training for Police units included proper search of vehicles, providing medical assistance to Iraqi civilians, as well as expanding the number of Iraqi police and improving their training overall. In theater, the brigade commanded over 5,000 soldiers. Units that the Brigade assumed control of included the 153rd Military Police Company of the Delaware Army National Guard and the 223rd Military Police Company of the Kentucky Army National Guard. The brigade worked with the 35th Engineer Brigade to finish construction on the Furat Training Facility, the primary training facility for thousands of Iraqi police. The project was completed in February 2008. In August 2008, the brigade began facilitating the transition for the 8th Military Police Brigade, which was set to replace the 18th MP Brigade when its 15-month tour of duty ended. The brigade cased its colors on 2 December 2008 and began redeploying back to its home bases. The 18th MP brigade trained 20,000 Iraqi police during its deployment, and lost 15 soldiers.

In addition to the brigade's support to the war on terrorism, many soldiers of the brigade continually conduct law enforcement and force protection duties in communities located throughout the central region of Europe.

== Honors ==
=== Campaign streamers ===
Conflict	Streamer	Year(s)
Vietnam War	Counteroffensive, Phase II	1966–1967
Vietnam War	Counteroffensive, Phase III	1967–1968
Vietnam War	Tet Counteroffensive	1968
Vietnam War	Counteroffensive, Phase IV	1968
Vietnam War	Counteroffensive, Phase V	1968
Vietnam War	Counteroffensive, Phase VI	1968–1969
Vietnam War	Tet 69/Counteroffensive	1969
Vietnam War	Summer–Fall 1969	1969
Vietnam War	Winter–Spring 1970	1970
Vietnam War	Sanctuary Counteroffensive	1970
Vietnam War	Counteroffensive, Phase VII	1970–1971
Vietnam War	Consolidation I	1970
Vietnam War	Consolidation II	1971
Vietnam War	Cease-Fire	1973
Operation Iraqi Freedom	Iraq	2003–2004
Operation Iraqi Freedom	Iraq	2007–2008
Operation Enduring Freedom	Afghanistan	2008–2009
Operation Enduring Freedom	Afghanistan	2013–2014
