= 728th Military Police Battalion =

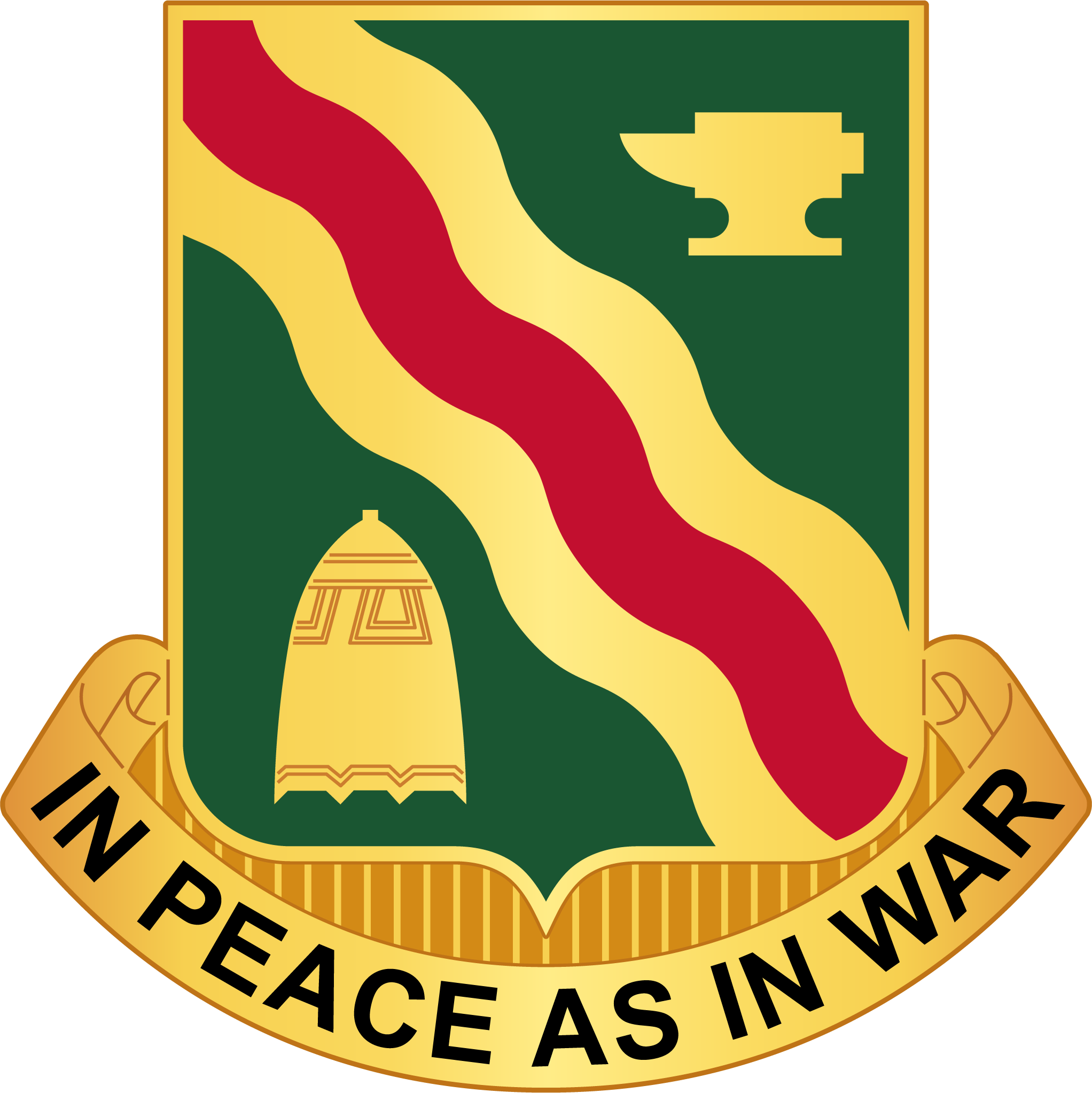
- 728th MP BN's Distinctive Unit Insignia
- Active: 19 January 1942 – current
- Country: United States
- Branch: Army
- Type: Military Police
- Size: Battalion
- Part of: 8th Military Police Brigade
- Garrison/HQ: Schofield Barracks, Hawaii
- Motto: "In Peace as in War"
- Engagements: Korean War: CCF Intervention; First UN Counteroffensive; CCF Spring Offensive; UN Summer-Fall Offensive; Second Korean Winter; Korea, Summer-Fall 1952; Third Korean Winter; Korea, Summer 1953
- Decorations: Army Superior Unit Award for 1988
- Battle honours: Meritorious Unit Commendation (Army) for KOREA 1950–1952; Meritorious Unit Commendation (Army) for KOREA 1952–1954

Commanders
- Commander: LTC Christopher H. Jacobsen
- CSM: CSM Richard R. Brinkley
- Notable commanders: LTC Rebecca E. Beard, LTC Jarrod R. Blaisdell, LTC Theresa Farrell, LTC Ross Guieb, LTC L. Omar Lomas, LTC Brian R. Bisacre, LTC Jeffrey A. Mello

Military police signage on a cannon for the 3rd Platoon, Company B of the 728th MP BN

The 728th Military Police Battalion performs Military Police operations to allow for United States forces to move freely through an assigned area. The Battalion also provides law and order to all installations within United States Army Garrison Hawaii. The 728th Military Police comprises the 58th Military Police Company, the 552d Military Police Company, the Headquarters and Headquarters Detachment, and the 520th Military Working Dog Detachment. The 728th Headquarters is located at Schofield Barracks, Hawaii. The Battalion works in support of Headquarters and Headquarters Detachment (HHD) and the Soldiers assigned to it.

== History ==
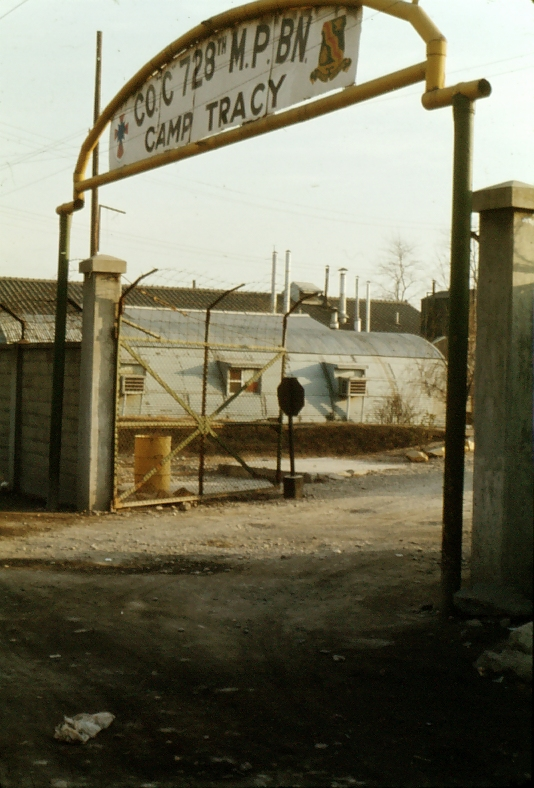
This 1971 picture shows the entrance to Company C, 728 MP Bn at Camp Tracy in Korea

=== World War II ===
The 728th was activated 19 January 1942, at Fort Custer, Michigan. The primary mission of the 728th was at first the training of men for combat and maintaining alert status for the protection of war production industry in Detroit, Michigan. During the Detroit race riot of 1943 the 728th helped maintain security in Detroit. On 28 October 1946, after the cessation of World War II hostilities, the 728th was awarded the Meritorious Unit Commendation for its valiant performance of duty during the period 1942 through 1945.

=== Cold War ===
From 1946 until 1950, the 728th remained stateside where its mission was focused on maintaining domestic security in various areas in the United States. Soon thereafter the battalion was transferred to Yokohama, Japan. When North Korea invaded South Korea and the United States began their intervention the 728th was reassembled in Pusan, South Korea. Their new mission was operation and maintaining traffic on the Green Diamond Main Supply Route (MSR). During the next eight months, many soldiers of the unit took active part in combat to suppress guerrilla activities and respond to ever changing battles. At some point after the "MacArthur Invasion" the battalion headquarters was transferred to Incheon, South Korea. As security conditions in the Korean theater improved the battalion headquarters was again transferred, this time to Seoul. In 1951 the Battalion began assisting in traffic control and other civil law enforcement duties. The unit was a major participant in the Korean War until the signing of the Armistice Agreement in 1953.

Since the end of Korean War the mission of the 728th has been to provide Military Police support to the American troops around the Republic of Korea and to maintain order in the assigned area. The 728th Military Police Battalion missions have included providing security for the return of hostages of the USS Pueblo and maintaining security in support of the 1988 Summer Olympics in Seoul.

=== Activities in Iraq ===
On 21 October 2004, two platoons of the 728th MP Battalion (approximately 70 personnel) deployed to Iraq in support of the United States mission in the Iraqi War. The 57th Military Police Company at Camp Carroll in Waegwan, and the 552nd Military Police Company at Camp Hialeah in Pusan, each supplied 35 troops for this deployment. Prior to their departure, the troops received two weeks of Iraq-specific combat training which included how to deal with roadside bombs and other improvised explosive devices; and information on the culture and peoples of Iraq. "This redeployment does not represent the start of a trend of sending soldiers from the peninsula [of South Korea] to Southwest Asia", Maj. Kate Johnson, an 8th U.S. Army spokeswoman in Seoul, stated. "Our mission is the deterrence on the peninsula, and remains deterrence on the peninsula". This assignment was expected to last at least six months, after which, the troops would return to their duties in Korea.

However, in June 2006 the entire 57th MP Co deployed in support of Operation Iraqi Freedom, forth and fifth wave to Baghdad, Iraq. The 57th MP Co conducted Police Training and Transitioning (PTT) with the Iraqi Police (I.P.). This training was but not limited to proper police procedures, patrol, and support of resources and infastructur of police stations and Jails. While the 57th MP Co was deployed to Iraq during this time, the 8th MP BDE moved from South Korea to Scholfied Barracks, HI. When the 57th MP Co was finished with their assignment in Iraq, the 57th was ordered back to state side. In September 2007, the 57th MP Co. left Baghdad, Iraq and went to their new home in Hawaii. During the 15 month deployment from June 2006 until September 2007, the 57th MP Co. was attached to the 89th Military Police Brigade, out of Ft. Hood, Texas.

On 10 December 2007, the 728th MP Battalion assumed the duties of the 97th Military Police Battalion in Iraq. These duties include helping to educate and train the Iraqi Police in operations and policing tactics.

=== Present ===
In October 2024, the 728th Military Police Battalion inactivated two companies and two detachments- the 57th Military Police Company, the 558th Military Police Company, the 13th Military Police Detachment, and the 39th Military Police Detachment.
