= 709th Military Police Battalion =

- Active: 1942 - present
- Branch: United States Army
- Type: Military Police
- Size: Battalion
- Part of: 18th Military Police Brigade
- Garrison/HQ: Vilseck, Germany
- Nickname(s): The Warrior Battalion
- Motto(s): Guardians of the Troops!
- Colors: Green and Gold
- Engagements: World War II; Operation Iraqi Freedom; Operation Enduring Freedom

Commanders
- Commander: Lieutenant Colonel Russel B. Smith
- Command Sergeant Major: Command Sergeant Major Antonio J. Soto
- Past Commanders: LTC Richard H. Martin; LTC William B. Halloway; LTC Ted S. Chesney; LTC Richard A. Mosco; LTC Richard D. Miller; LTC John F. Fitzsimmons; LTC Robert N. Dillon; LTC Roger P. Hedgepeth; LTC Steven G. Yamashita; LTC Matthew R. Gragg; LTC Jeffrey A. Searl; LTC John W. Copeland; LTC Samuel A. Meyer

Insignia
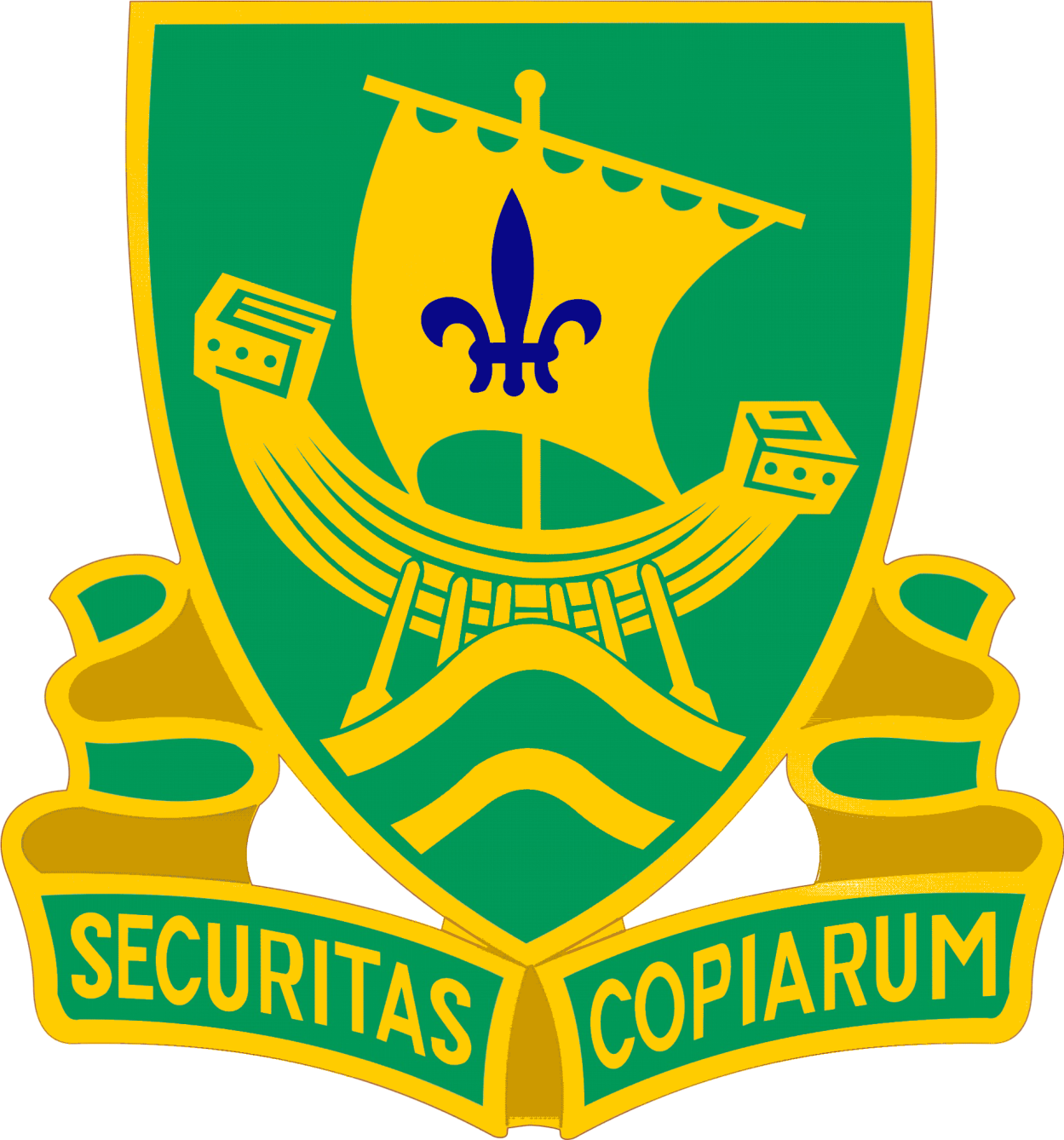
- Distinctive Unit Insignia

The 709th Military Police Battalion is a United States Army Military Police unit currently located on Rose Barracks in Vilseck, Germany. The Battalion is the United States Army's only Military Police Battalion in theater. The unit falls under the command of the 18th Military Police Brigade, associated with 21st Theater Sustainment Command.

The 709th Military Police Battalion relocated from Hanau to Grafenwoehr in 2007. The Battalion Headquarters again relocated in the fall of 2018 from Tower to Rose Barracks.

The 709th Military Police Battalion has served with honor and distinction in the European Theater since the summer of 1944. Stationed in Grafenwoehr Germany as part of the "Ever Vigilant" 18th Military Police Brigade, the battalion provides community law enforcement and force protection within thirteen communities while training for future operations and contingencies in support of the 21st Theater Sustainment Command. In addition to providing Law Enforcement across Europe, the Battalion also supports Operation Atlantic Resolve, to include Saber Guardian 2017, Saber Strike 2018 and many other exercises throughout the theater.

== Lineage and honors ==
- Began on 10 January 1942 in the Army of the United States as the 709th Military Police Battalion.
- Activated 9 April 1942 at Camp Niantic, Connecticut.
- Reorganized and redesignated 5 June 1945 as the 709th Military Police Service Battalion
- Reorganized and redesignated 18 September 1951 as the 709th Military Police Battalion and allotted to the Regular Army
- Companies A, B, and C inactivated 21 October 1977 in Germany

=== HHD 709th Military Police Battalion Campaign participation ===
- World War II:
  - Northern France
- Peace Keeping:
  - Operation Provide Comfort
  - Operation Provide Promise Kosovo & Bosnia
- GWOT:
  - Iraq - First Military Police Battalion to cross into Iraq
  - Afghanistan
- HHD 709th MP Bn Unit Decorations
  - Meritorious Unit Commendation for Afghanistan 2009-2010
  - Valorous Unit Award for IRAQ 2003–2004
  - Army Superior Unit Award for 1995–1996

== Subordinate units ==
HHD 709th Military Police Battalion - Vilseck; Commander: CPT Rivera-Rodriguez Christian, Detachment Sergeant: SFC Perry, Joseph

92nd Military Police Company - Kaiserslautern & Baumholder; Commander: CPT Anderson, Gartell, First Sergeant: 1SG Feliciano, Stevie

527th Military Police Company - Hohenfels & Ansbach; Commander: CPT Martin, Omar First Sergeant: 1SG Thomas

529th Military Police Company - Wiesbaden, Vicenza & Camp Darby; Commander: CPT Rico, Allan, First Sergeant: SFC Detwiler, Andrew

554th Military Police Company - Stuttgart; Commander: CPT Avello Camila, First Sergeant: 1SG SFC Burnett, Allison

615th Military Police Company - Vilseck; Commander: CPT Mallory Johnson, First Sergeant: SFC Luke Joseph

== Command group ==
- Lieutenant Colonel Russell B. Smith, Battalion Commander.
- Command Sergeant Major Nicholas L. Barnum, Battalion Command Sergeant Major.
- Major Kevin T. Niemczyk, Executive Officer.
- Major Heather R. Bilicki S3 OIC.
- Sergeant Major Yenkhanh Doan, S3 Sergeant Major.

== Unit decorations ==
Ribbon	Award	Year	Notes
	Valorous Unit Award	2003 – 2004	For service in Iraq
	Superior Unit Award	1995 – 1996	
	Meritorious Unit Commendation	2009 – 2010	For service in Afghanistan
