= 123rd Aviation Regiment =

The 123rd Aviation Regiment was an aviation regiment of the United States Army Aviation Branch.

The regiment traced its history to the 123rd Aviation Battalion active during the Vietnam War. Its parent division, the 23rd Infantry Division, became widely known after Company C, 1st Battalion, 20th Infantry (11th Infantry Brigade) led by Lieutenant William Calley slaughtered hundreds of South Vietnamese civilians in the My Lai Massacre in March 1968. A helicopter crew from the 123rd Aviation Battalion, led by Hugh Thompson, Jr., attempted to intervene in the massacre and were later awarded the Soldier's Medal. Seymour Hersh broke the story of the massacre in November 1969, and a year later 14 officers – including Samuel W. Koster, the division's commanding officer – were charged with covering the massacre up. Most of the charges were later dropped, but Koster was subsequently demoted and stripped of his Distinguished Service Medal.

Company "C," 123rd Aviation Battalion, was activated 17 December 1985 at Fort Campbell, Kentucky, as an element of the 101st Airborne Division. It was then reorganized and redesignated 16 September 1987 as Company C, 123d Aviation; concurrently relieved from assignment to the 101st Airborne Division and assigned to the 7th Infantry Division.

Reorganized and redesignated 16 October 1988 as Headquarters and Headquarters Company, 3d Battalion, 123d Aviation (organic elements concurrently constituted and activated).

In the late 1980s, the 1st Battalion, 123rd Aviation was operating in Panama.
