= 8th Military Police Brigade =

- 8th Military Police Brigade's CSIB
- Active: 26 July 1967 – 18 December 1967; 24 August 1968 – 01 July 1972; 16 April 1984 – present
- Country: United States
- Branch: United States Army
- Type: Military police unit
- Role: Militarized law enforcement
- Size: Brigade
- Part of: 8th Theater Sustainment Command
- Garrison/HQ: Schofield Barracks, Hawaii, U.S.
- Motto: Best Dog in the Fight
- Colors: Green and Gold
- Mascot: Watchdog

Commanders
- Current commander: COL Jeremy D. Prince
- Command Sergeant Major: CSM Antonio J. Soto

Insignia
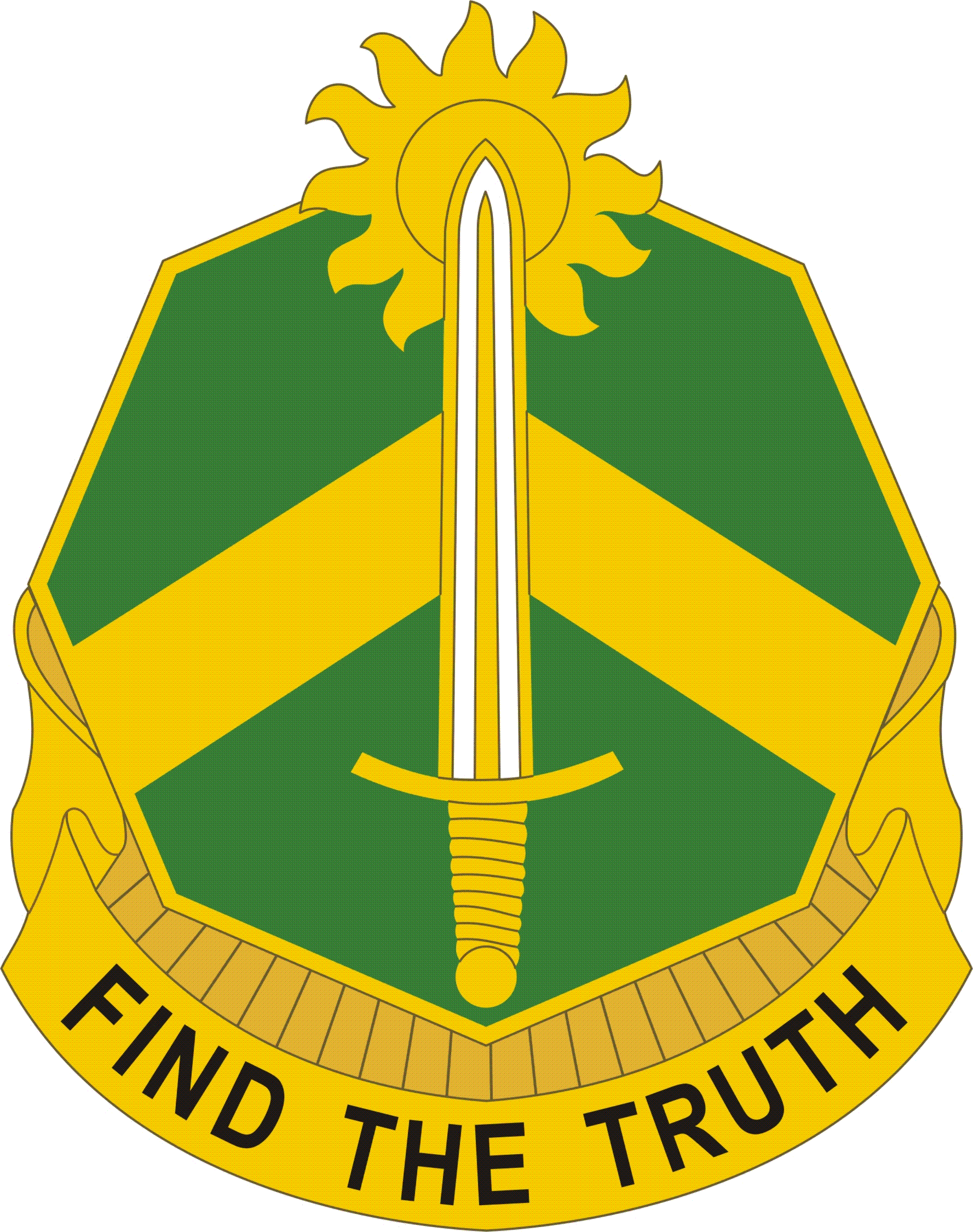
- Distinctive unit insignia

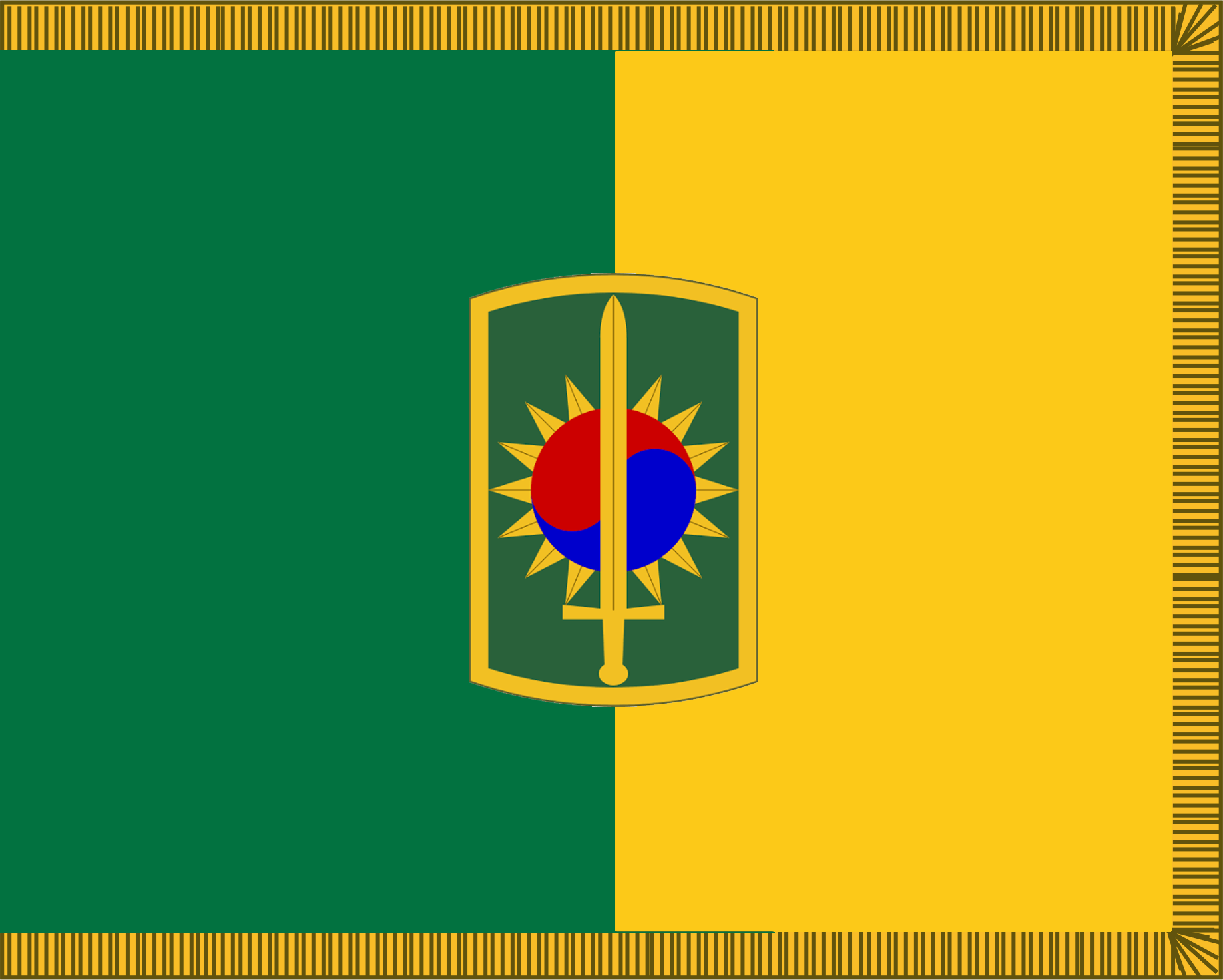
- 8th Military Police Brigade Flag

The 8th Military Police Brigade is a military police brigade of the United States Army based at Schofield Barracks, Hawaii. It is responsible for Army military police units within the United States Indo-Pacific Command Area of Responsibility.

Activated during the Vietnam War, the 8th Military Police Brigade was specifically organized to provide planning, direction, and supervision for the criminal investigation work required by the U.S. Army in Vietnam. It replaced a provisional Military Police Group (Criminal Investigation) that had been formed on 3 November 1966 in charge of all criminal investigative work in Vietnam, except for the metropolitan Saigon area.

In July 1972, it became the basis for the U.S. Army Criminal Investigation Center, Vietnam Field Office. It served in the region for several years and earning ten campaign streamers before being deactivated during the American forces pullout from the region. The brigade was reactivated in South Korea in the 1980s to provide command and control for all U.S. Pacific military police forces, and has since been moved to Hawaii, where much of U.S. Army Pacific is located.

== Organization ==
The Brigade is a subordinate unit of 8th Theater Sustainment Command of U.S. Army Pacific.

The 8th Military Police Brigade consists of three battalions: the 303rd Explosive Ordnance Disposal Battalion, 728th Military Police Battalion, and the 125th Finance Battalion. 728th MP BN "Warfighters" consists of the Headquarters and Headquarters Detachment, the 58th and 552d Military Police companies, and the 520th Military Police Working Dog Detachment. The 71st Chemical Company is attached to the 303rd Explosive Ordnance Disposal Battalion along with the 64th and 716th EOD Companies serving in Alaska.

== History ==
=== Vietnam War ===
The 8th Military Police Group was originally constituted on 8 April 1967 in the regular army and activated on 26 July at Fort Riley, Kansas. After seeing only five months of duty, the group was again deactivated on 18 December of that year.

On 24 August 1968 the group was again activated, this time in Vietnam. Its activation was part of a larger activation of several military police groups in the region to provide greater command and control for Military Police operating throughout the region. As such, the headquarters element took command of military police units already operating in the country. The Brigade provided policing duties, based in Long Binh along with the 89th Military Police Group. During that time it was a subordinate unit of the 18th Military Police Brigade. It received its distinctive unit insignia on 12 November 1969. The group operated in Vietnam until the pullout of U.S. forces from the nation, receiving ten campaign streamers for its role in the conflict.

=== Reactivation and South Korea ===
The 8th Military Police Brigade (Provisional) was constituted in South Korea in September 1984 in response to the need for cohesive command and control element in the event of war, for the numerous non-divisional Military Police units on the peninsula. At the time it consisted of the 94th Military Police Battalion in Yongsan (Seoul) and the 728th Military Police Battalion in Taegu (Camp Walker). However, the brigade would remain provisional and would not be officially activated for another ten years while it operated in this capacity.

In 1995, the concept plan was approved for the activation of a military police brigade headquarters in Korea. The 8th MP Brigade was officially activated on 16 April 1996 to provide command and control for the 728th Military Police Battalion and the 94th Military Police Battalion in armistice and to serve as the theater military police brigade during hostilities. The same day, it received its shoulder sleeve insignia.

In July 2006, the 8th MP Brigade Headquarters and the 728th MP Battalion were reassigned to U.S. Army Pacific and moved from Korea to Schofield Barracks, Hawaii. It was placed under the command of the newly created 8th Theater Sustainment Command. The command is responsible for preparing the 25th Infantry Division and other 8th Army units for worldwide deployment.

=== Global War on Terrorism ===
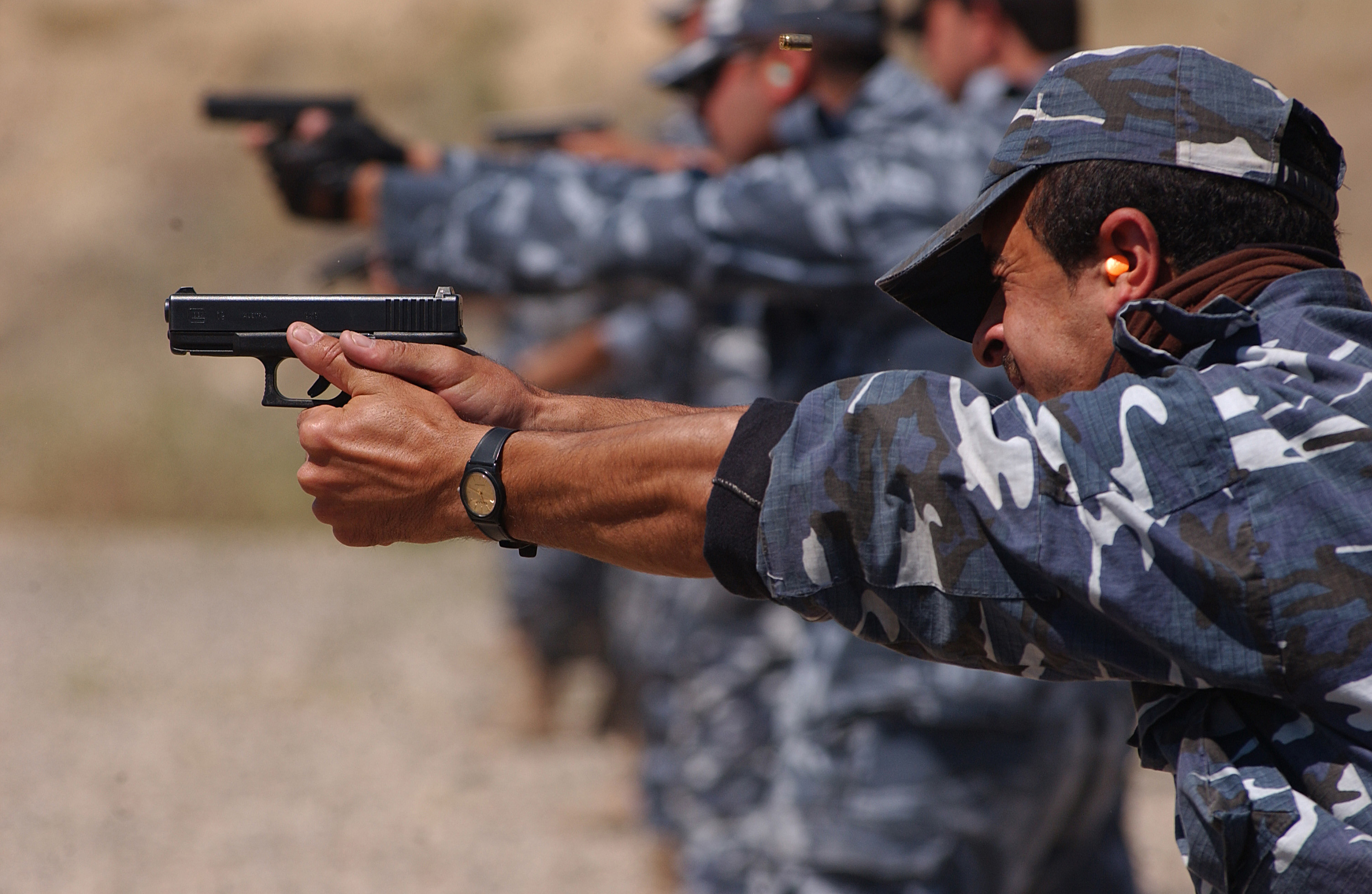
Iraqi Police in training.

==== Iraq War ====
Subordinate units of the brigade's 728th MP Battalion deployed to Iraq in October 2004 to provide military police duties while the Army formed a clear rotational schedule for MP units coming and going from the country during Operation Iraqi Freedom. In October 2007, the Brigade again deployed elements of the 728th MP Battalion to Iraq for 15 months in support of Operation Iraqi Freedom. The units suffered several casualties, including soldiers killed in ambushes and vehicle accidents.

Brigade headquarters deployed in the fall of 2008 in support of Operation Iraqi Freedom. In July 2008, the 8th MP Brigade began its move into Iraq with a pre-deployment site survey to support the upcoming deployment into the country. The brigade headquarters replaced the 18th Military Police Brigade, which ended its deployment in fall of 2008. The 8th MP brigade continued the training and expansion of the national Iraqi Police force in the Baghdad area. On 2 December, the brigade officially took control from the 18th MP brigade and began its deployment.

== Honors ==
=== Campaign participation credit ===
Conflict	Streamer	Year(s)
Vietnam War	Counteroffensive, Phase V	1968
Vietnam War	Counteroffensive, Phase VI	1968–1969
Vietnam War	Tet 69/Counteroffensive	1969
Vietnam War	Summer–Fall 1969	1969
Vietnam War	Winter–Spring 1970	1970
Vietnam War	Sanctuary Counteroffensive	1970
Vietnam War	Counteroffensive, Phase VII	1970–1971
Vietnam War	Consolidation I	1970
Vietnam War	Consolidation II	1971
Vietnam War	Cease Fire	1973

=== Decorations ===
Ribbon	Award	Year	Notes
	Meritorious Unit Commendation (Army)	1968–1969	for service in Vietnam
	Republic of Vietnam Cross of Gallantry with Palm	1968–1972	for service in Vietnam
