= Obsolete shoulder sleeve insignia of the United States Army =

Shoulder sleeve insignia (SSI) are cloth patches worn on the shoulders of US Army uniforms since World War I to identify the primary headquarters to which a soldier is assigned. Insignia is issued to commands, field armies, corps, divisions and brigades. Some other formations also have SSI's and rarely - a regiment may have one. They are created and assigned by the US Army Institute of Heraldry. When a unit is deactivated, so usually is the SSI, but it can be reassigned. Also an SSI can be deactivated and the unit will then usually wear the insignia of its next highest command (usually a division or a command).

Notes:

- One asterisk (*) after a unit's date span (or an insignia's date span—preferred when available (Note: Insignia date spans are preferred, since a unit may use several insignia during its life span (e.g., the 85th Infantry Division).)) indicates a unit has seen internal deactivations. See the corresponding unit article for more information.
- Two asterisks (**) after a unit's date span indicate the unit has been re-designated (e.g., a command re-designated to a brigade). A re-designation is often accompanied by a considerable reorganization or change to a different unit size.

== Army elements or predecessors in joint units ==
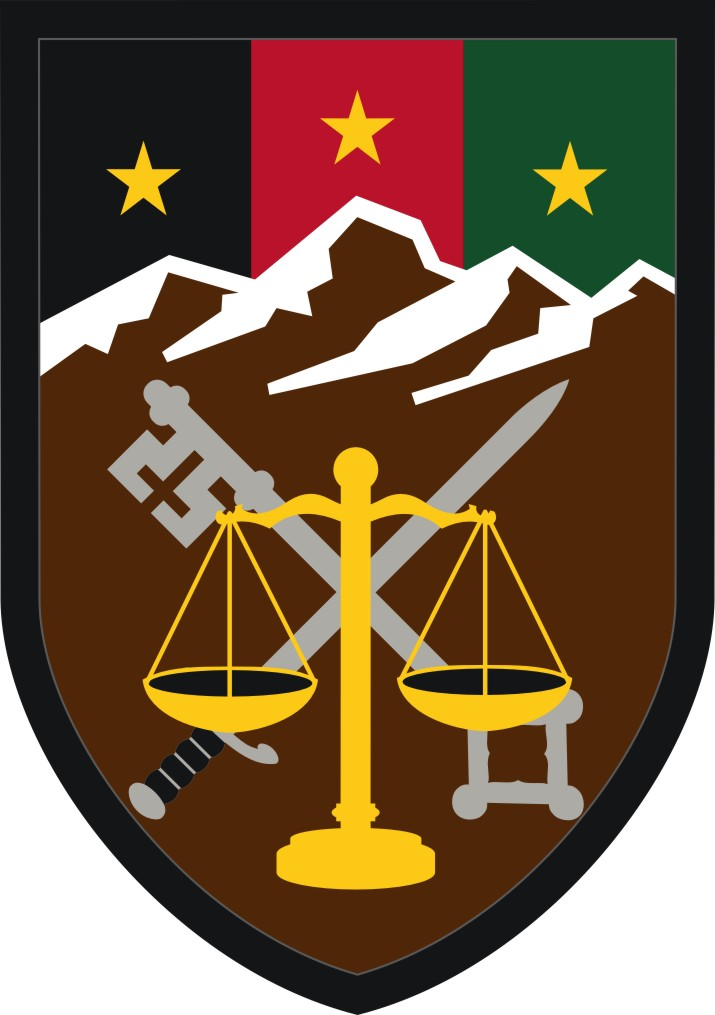
Combined Joint Interagency Task Force 435
2012–2014

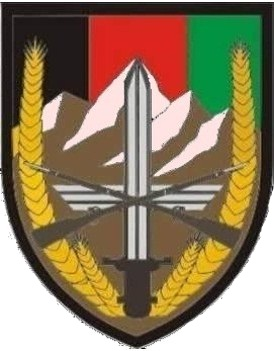
US Forces – Afghanistan (USFOR-A)

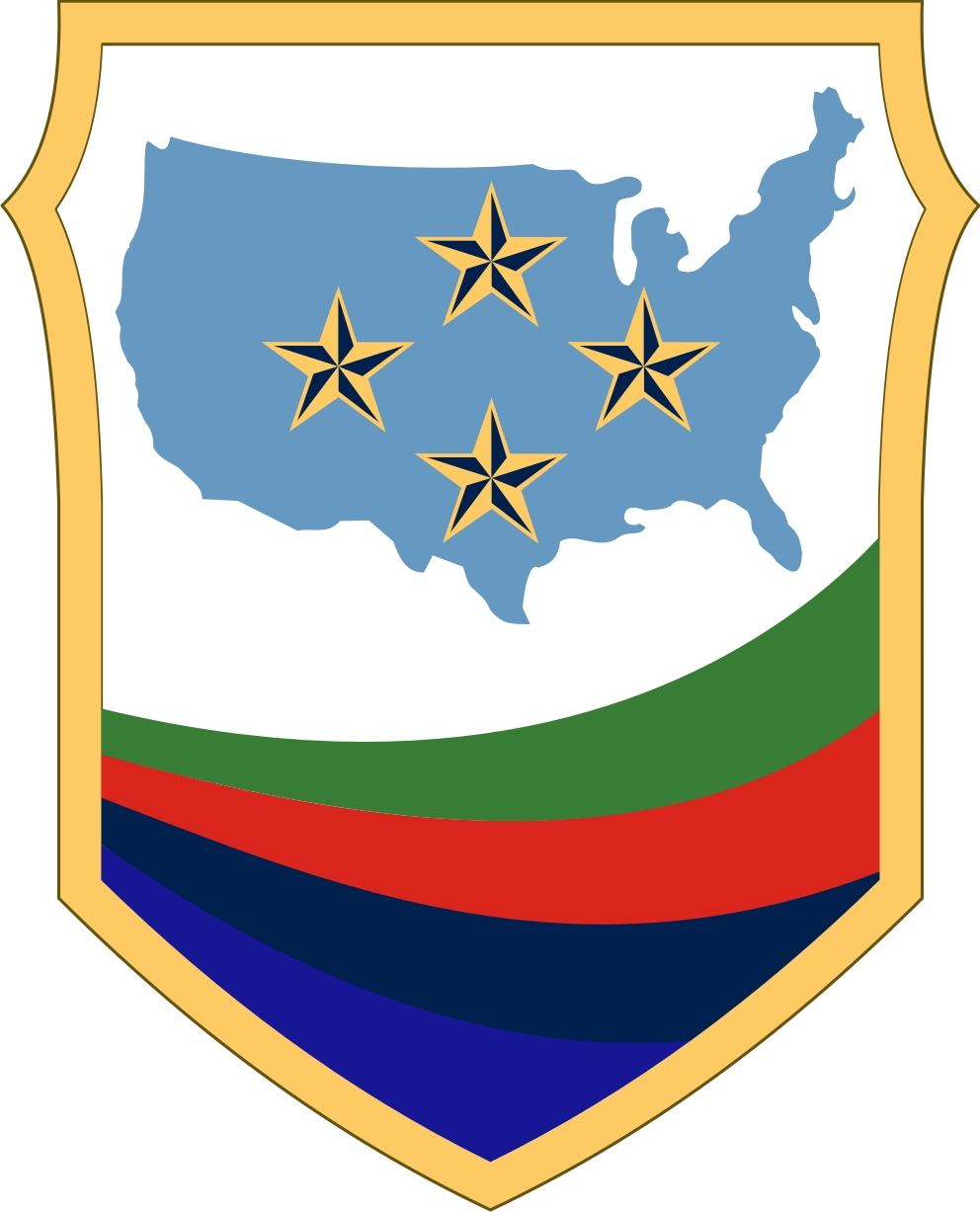
US Joint Forces Command
1999–2011

Military Assistance Command, Vietnam
1966–1973

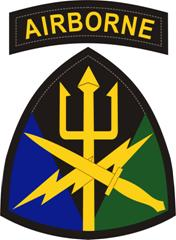
Special Operations Command, Joint Forces Command
2003–2013

== Army groups ==
Sixth Army Group
1944–1945

Twelfth Army Group
1944–1945

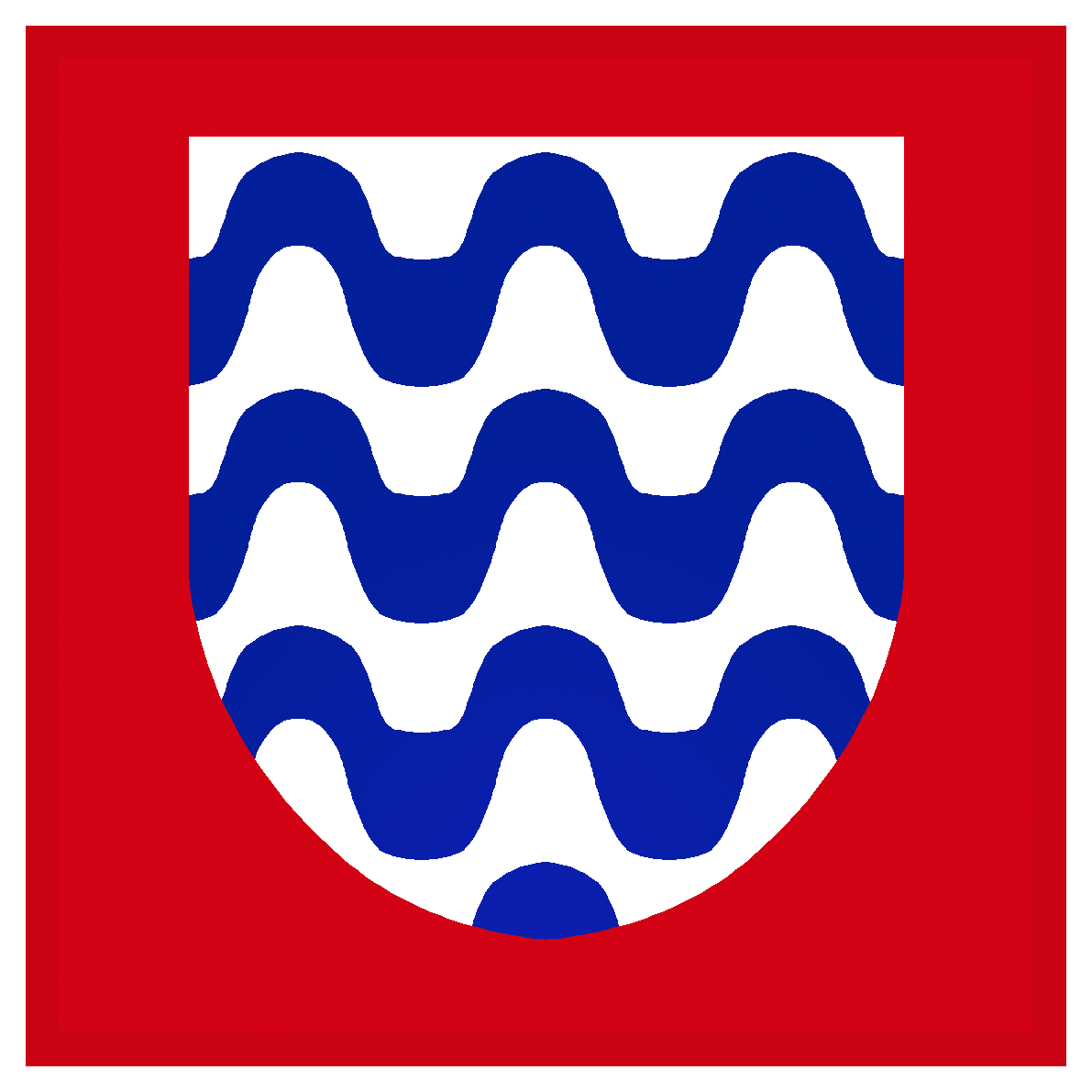
Fifteenth Army Group
1943–1945

== Numbered brigades ==
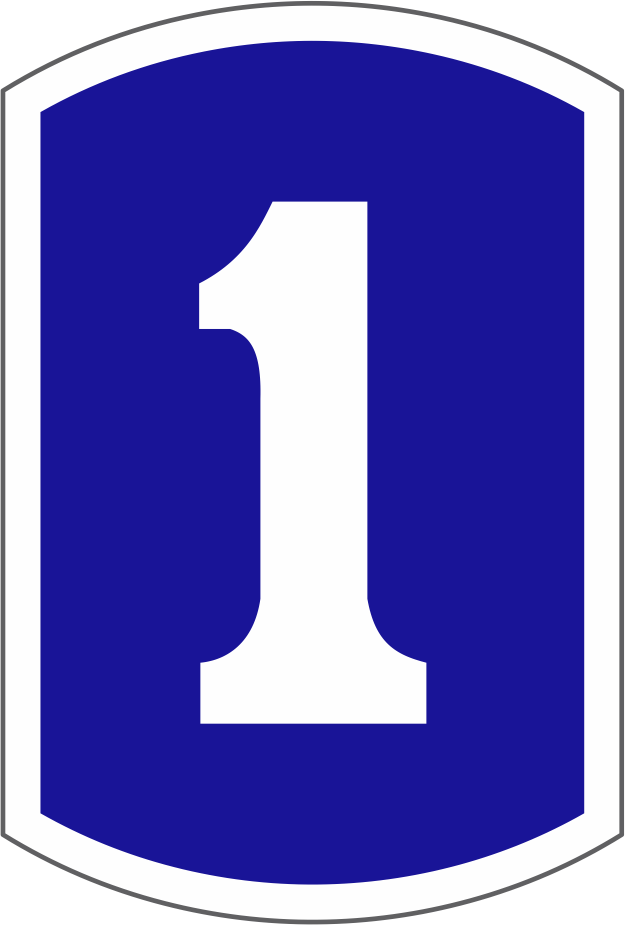
1st Infantry Brigade 1958–1962

1st Maneuver Enhancement Brigade 2006–2015

1st Sustainment Brigade

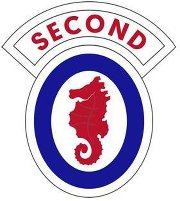
2nd Engineer Brigade 1942–2015*

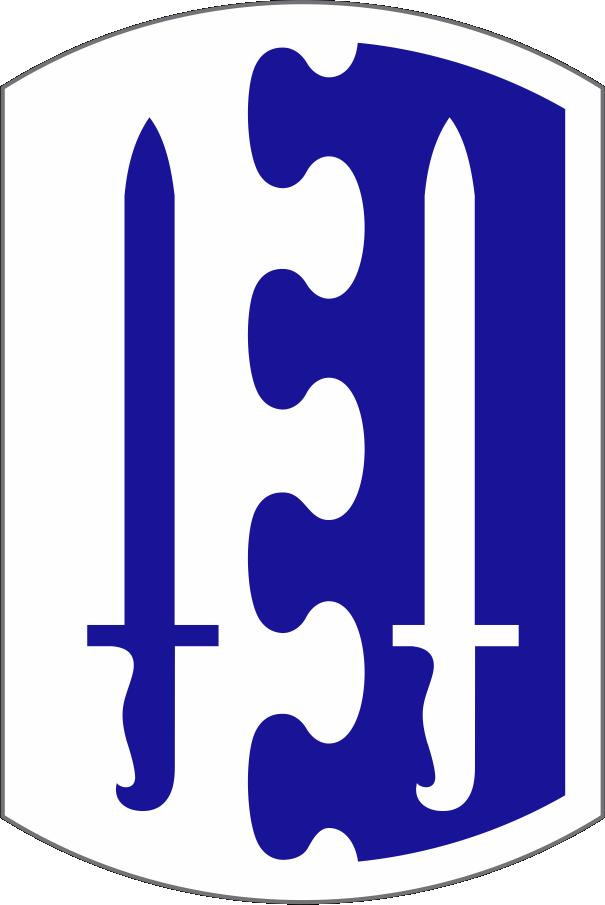
2nd Infantry Brigade

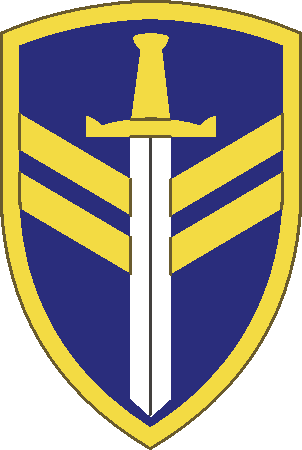
2nd Support Brigade 1965–1993

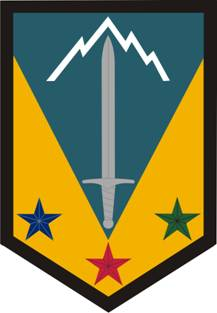
3rd Maneuver Enhancement Brigade 2008–2011

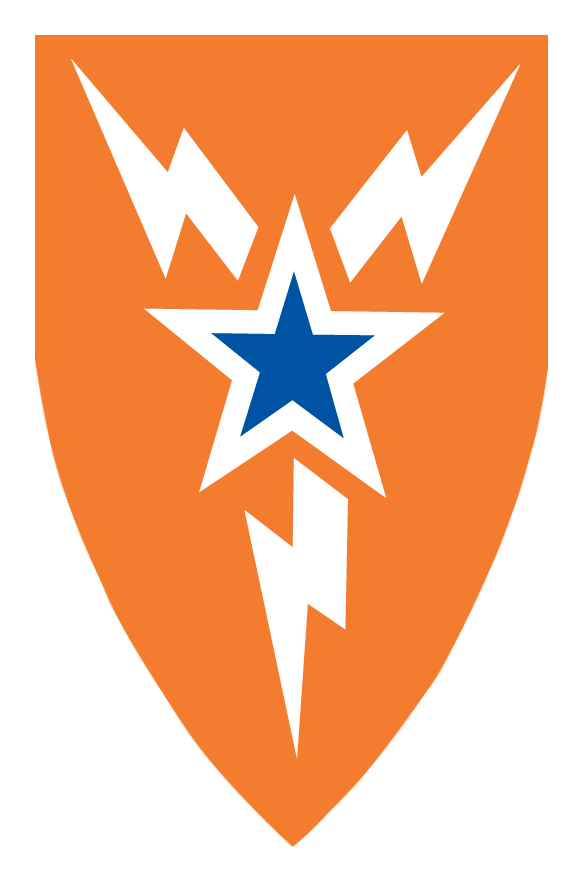
3rd Signal Brigade 1946–2008

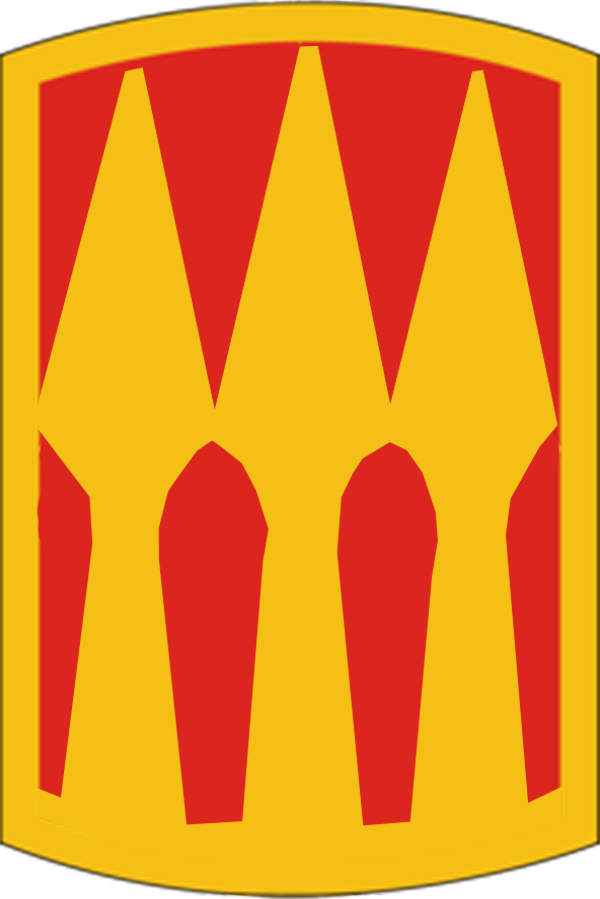
3rd Support Brigade 1964–1969

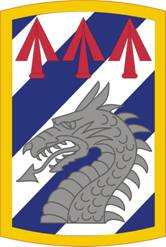
3rd Sustainment Brigade

4th Maneuver Enhancement Brigade 2008–2015

4th Medical Brigade 1928–1995*

4th Sustainment Brigade

5th Armored Brigade 1975–1995**

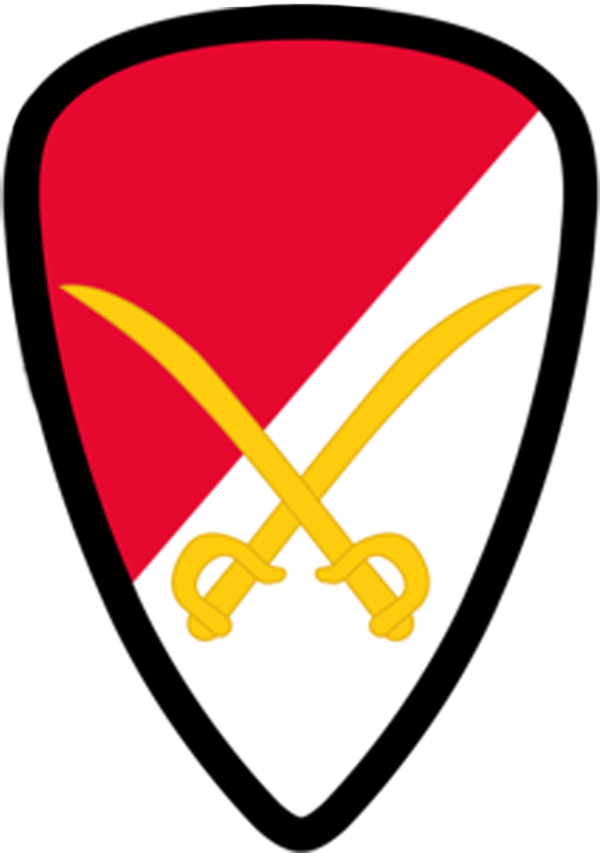
6th Cavalry Brigade 1927–2005*

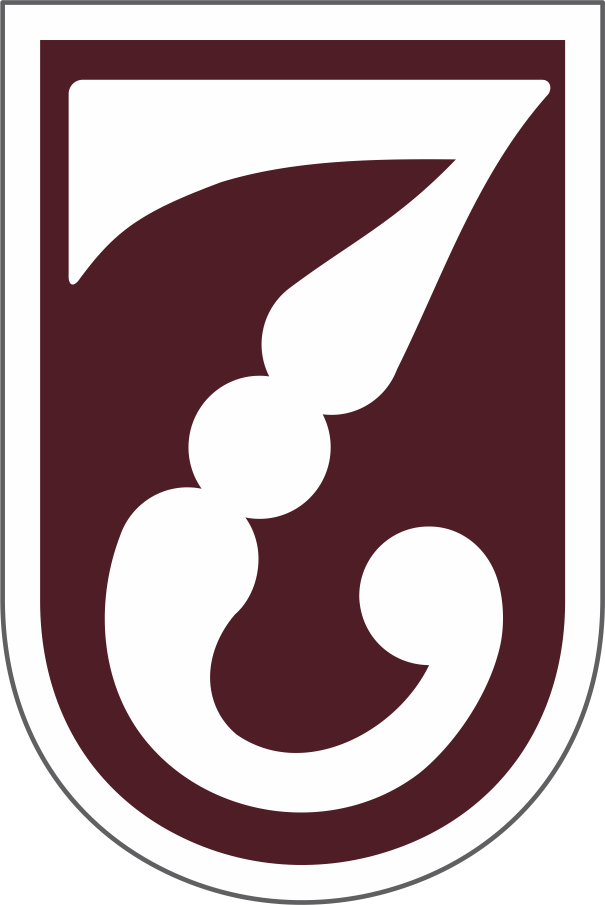
7th Medical Brigade 1965–1973

7th Signal Brigade 1970–2014

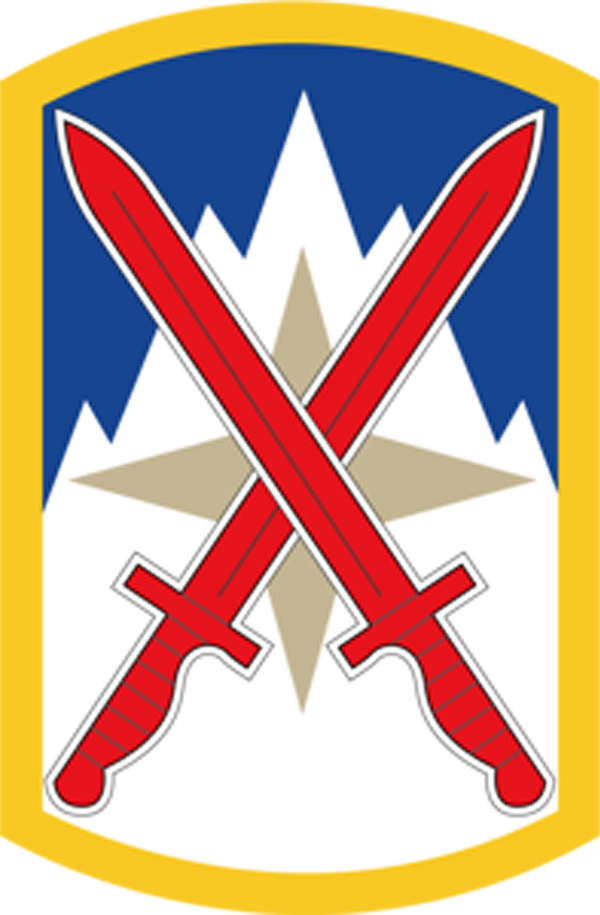
10th Sustainment Brigade

11th Infantry Brigade 1917–1971*

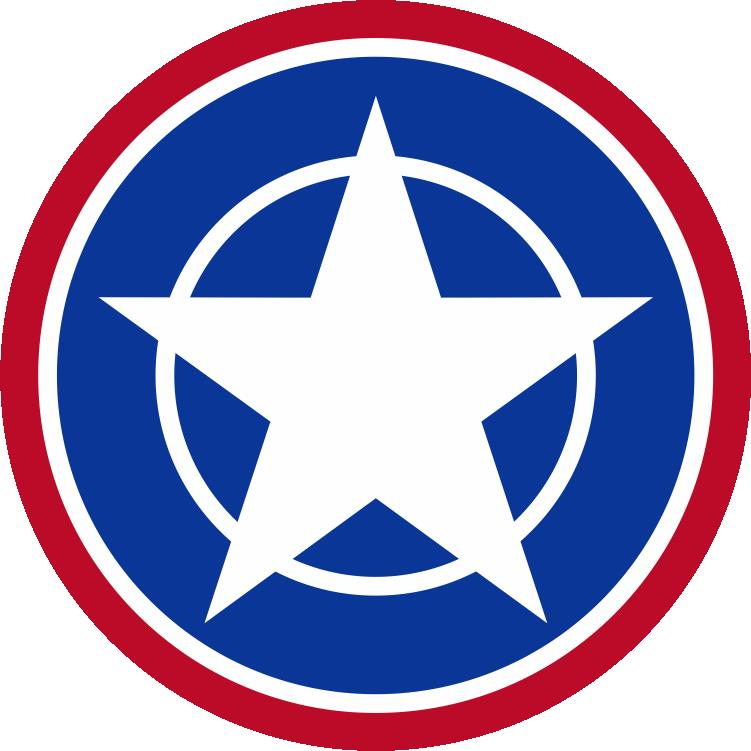
12th Support Brigade

15th Sustainment Brigade

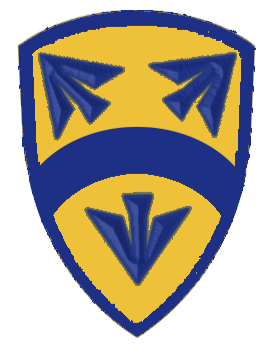
15th Support Brigade 1966-1973

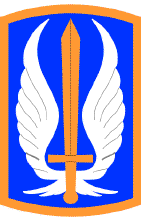
17th Aviation Brigade 1965–2005

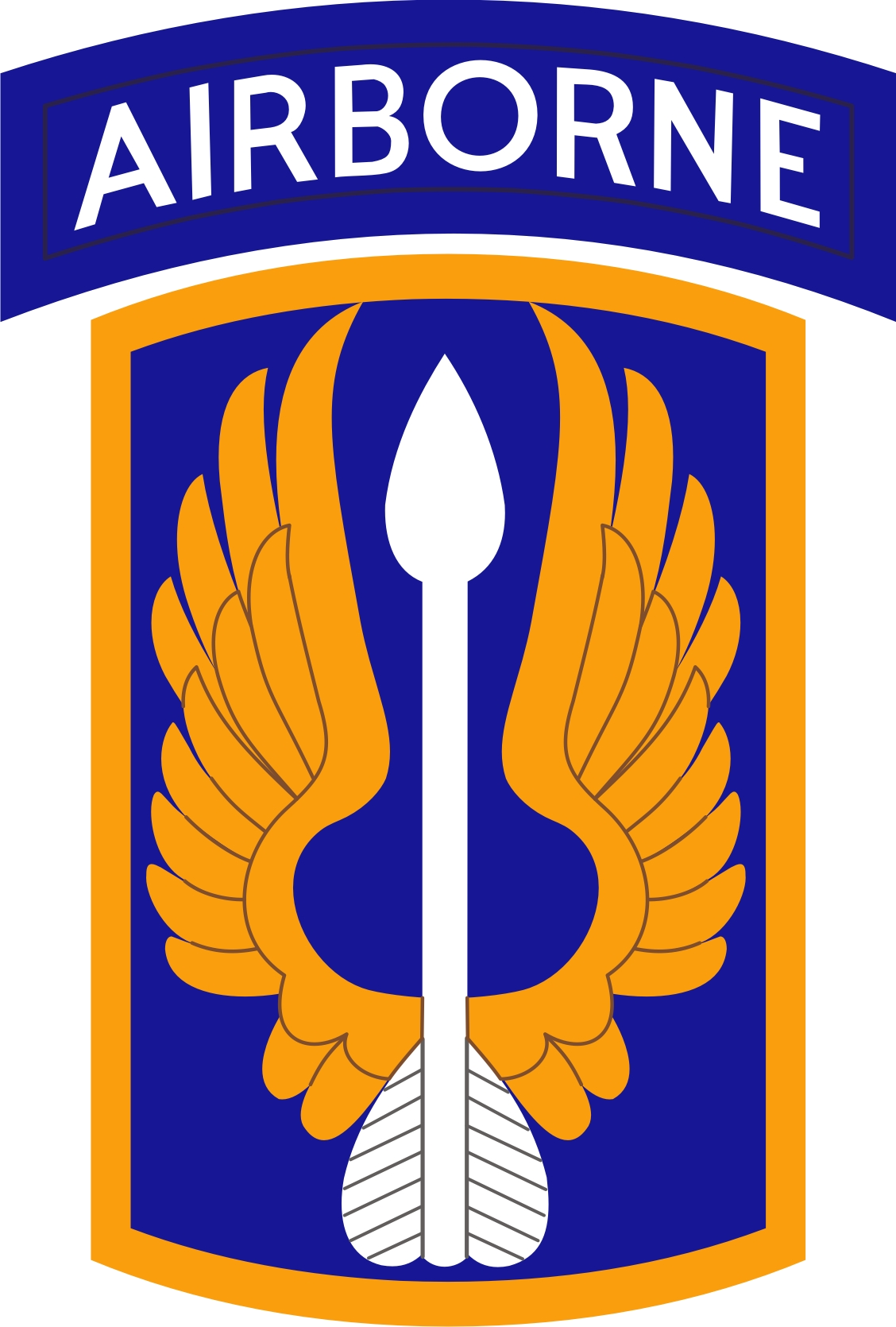
18th Aviation Brigade 1987–2006

18th Engineer Brigade 1921–2014*

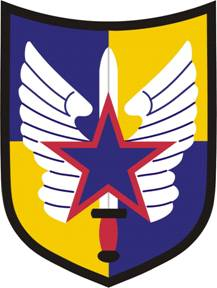
20th Aviation Brigade

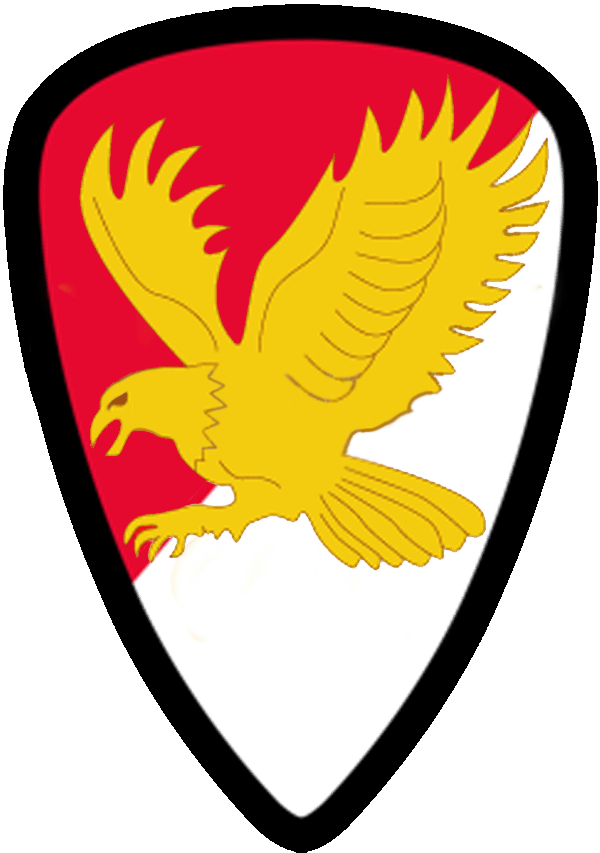
21st Cavalry Brigade 1984–2015

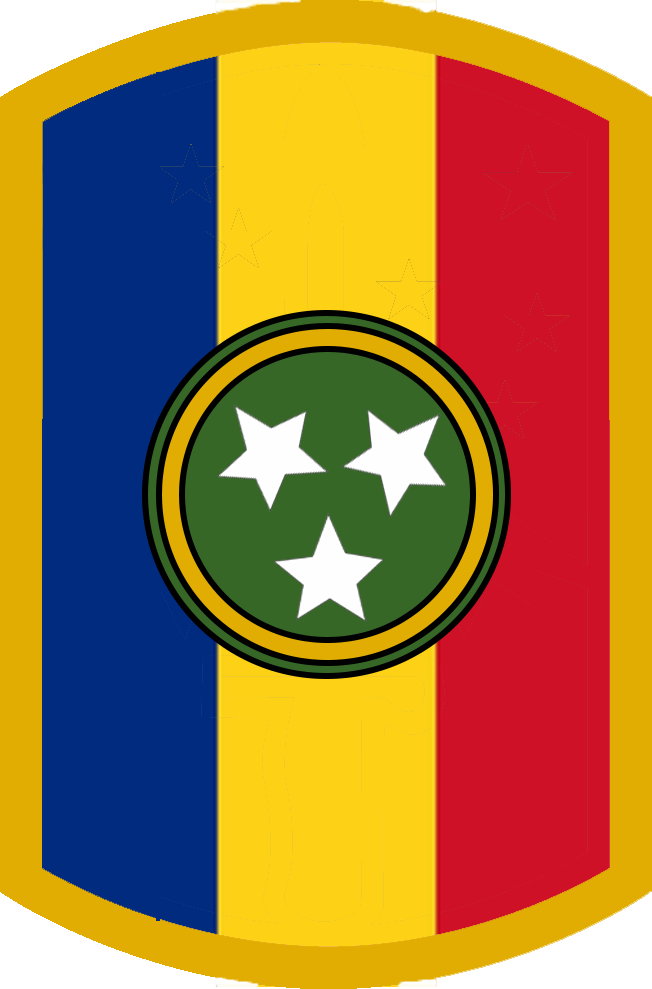
30th Armored Brigade 1974–1996

36th Infantry Brigade 1973–1980

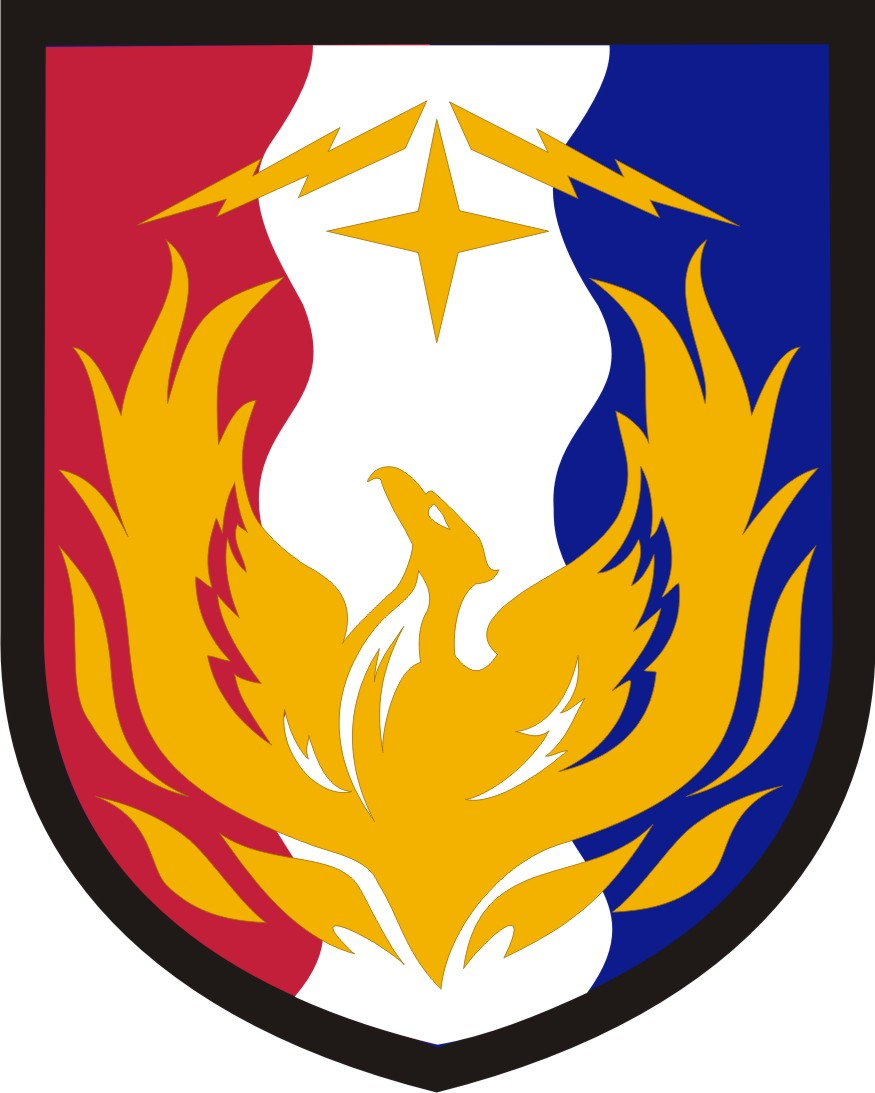
36th Sustainment Brigade

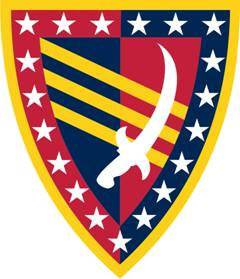
38th Sustainment Brigade

40th Infantry Brigade 1917–2008**

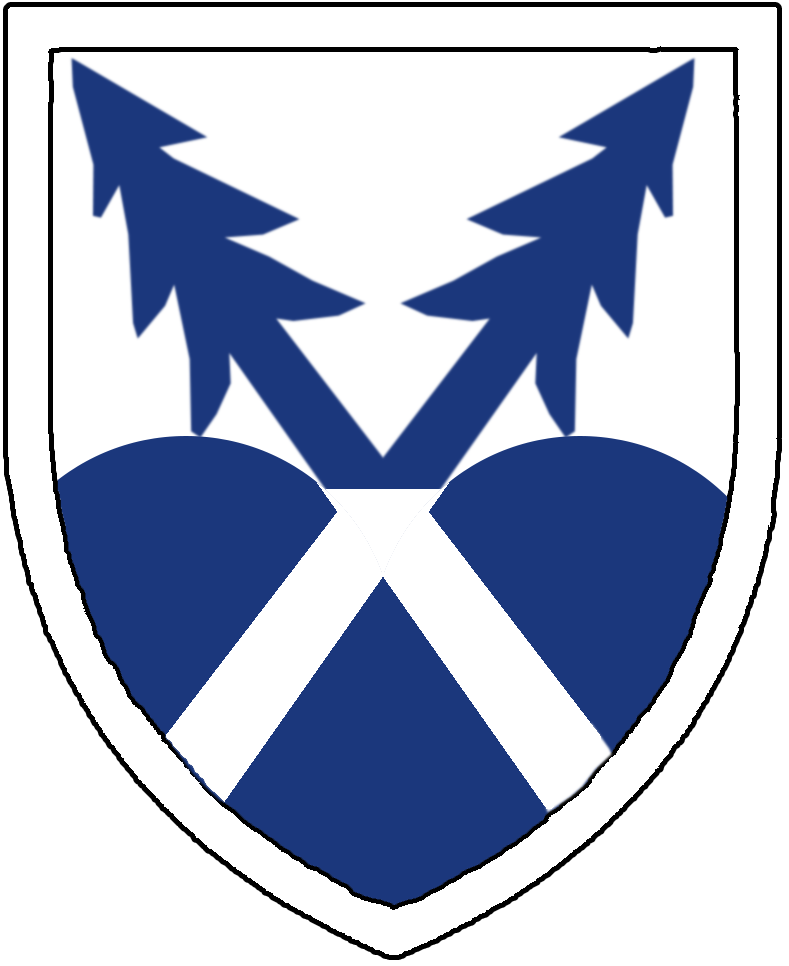
41st Infantry Brigade 1965–1994

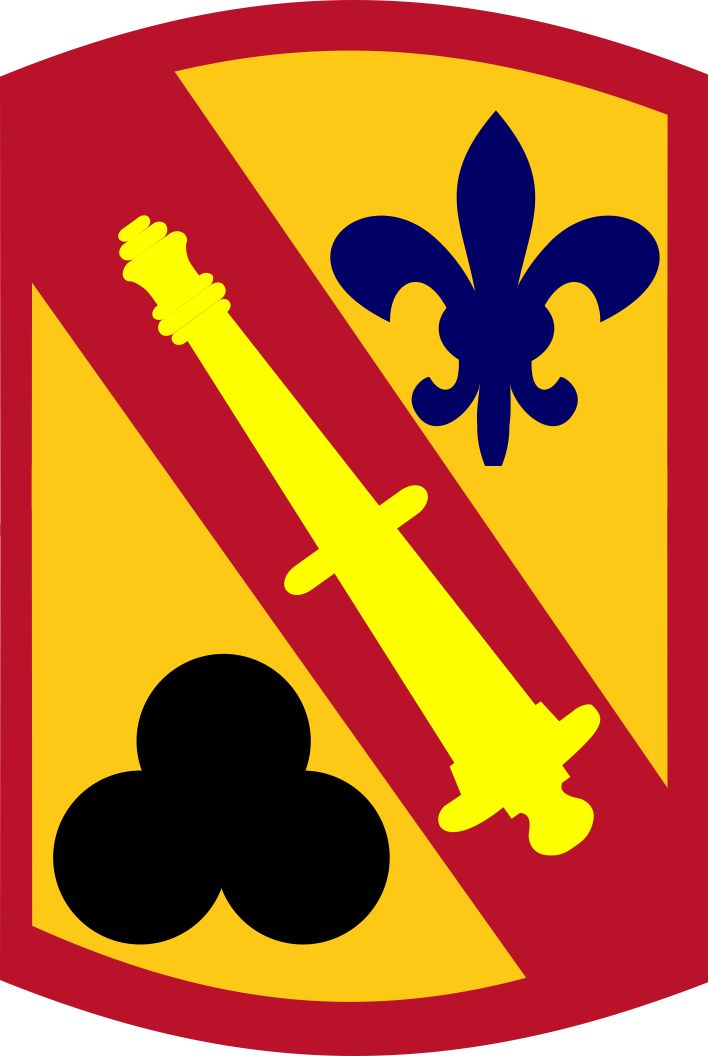
42nd Field Artillery Brigade

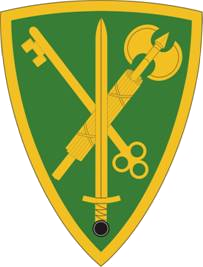
42nd Military Police Brigade 1968–2025

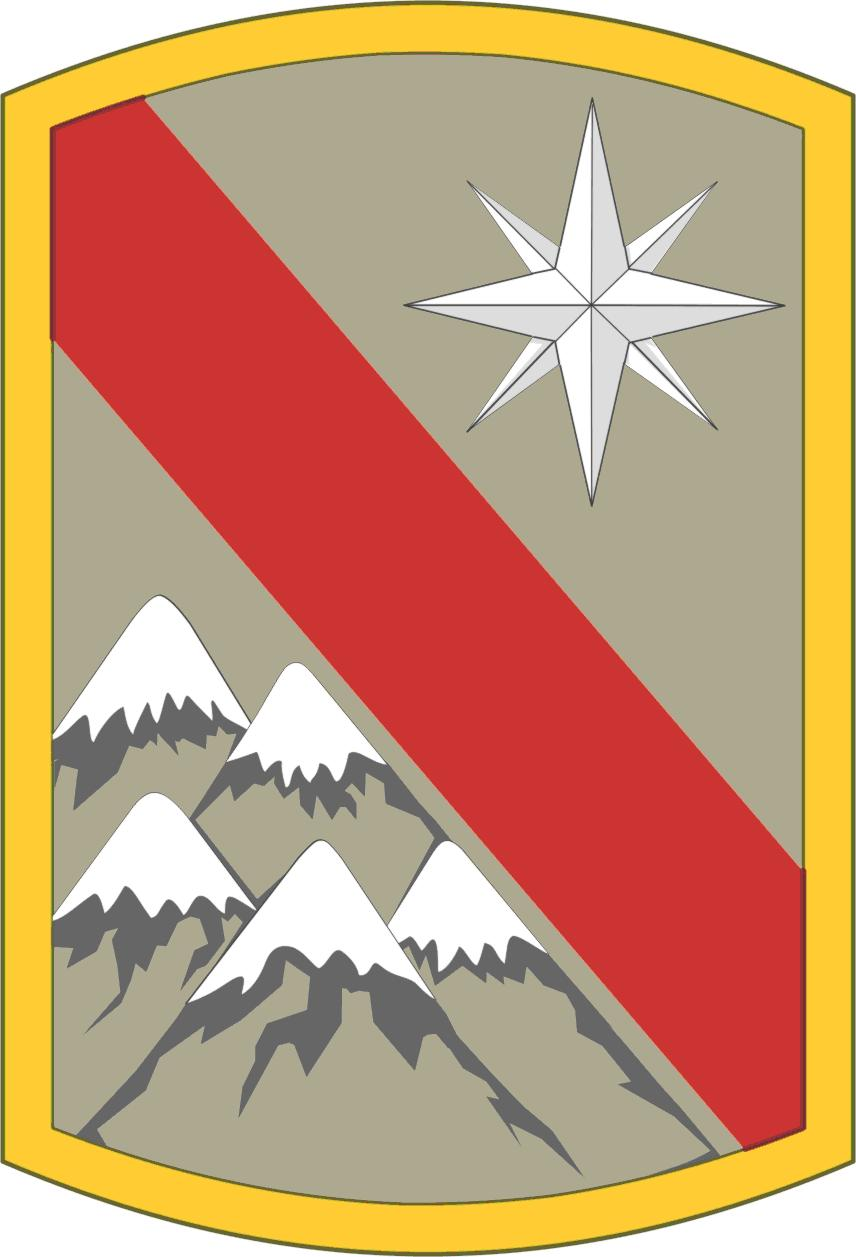
43rd Sustainment Brigade 1966–1993

45th Sustainment Brigade 1936–2015

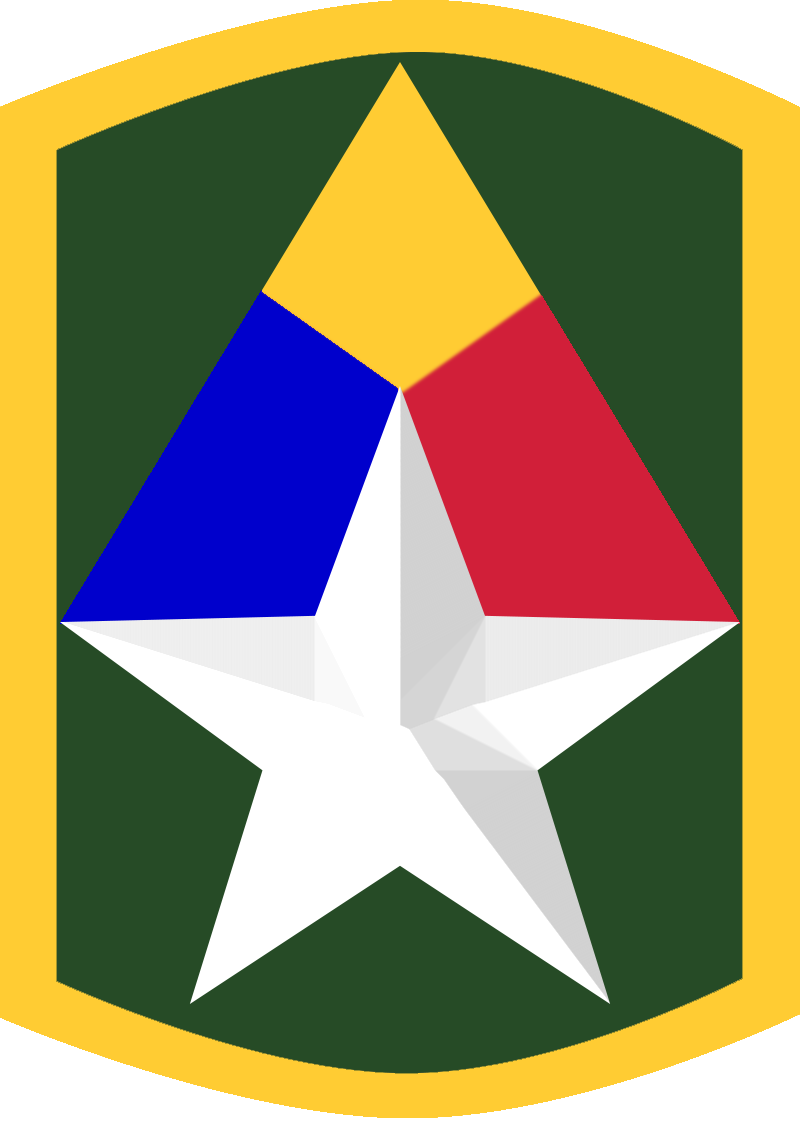
49th Armored Brigade

50th Infantry Brigade Combat Team 1993–2017

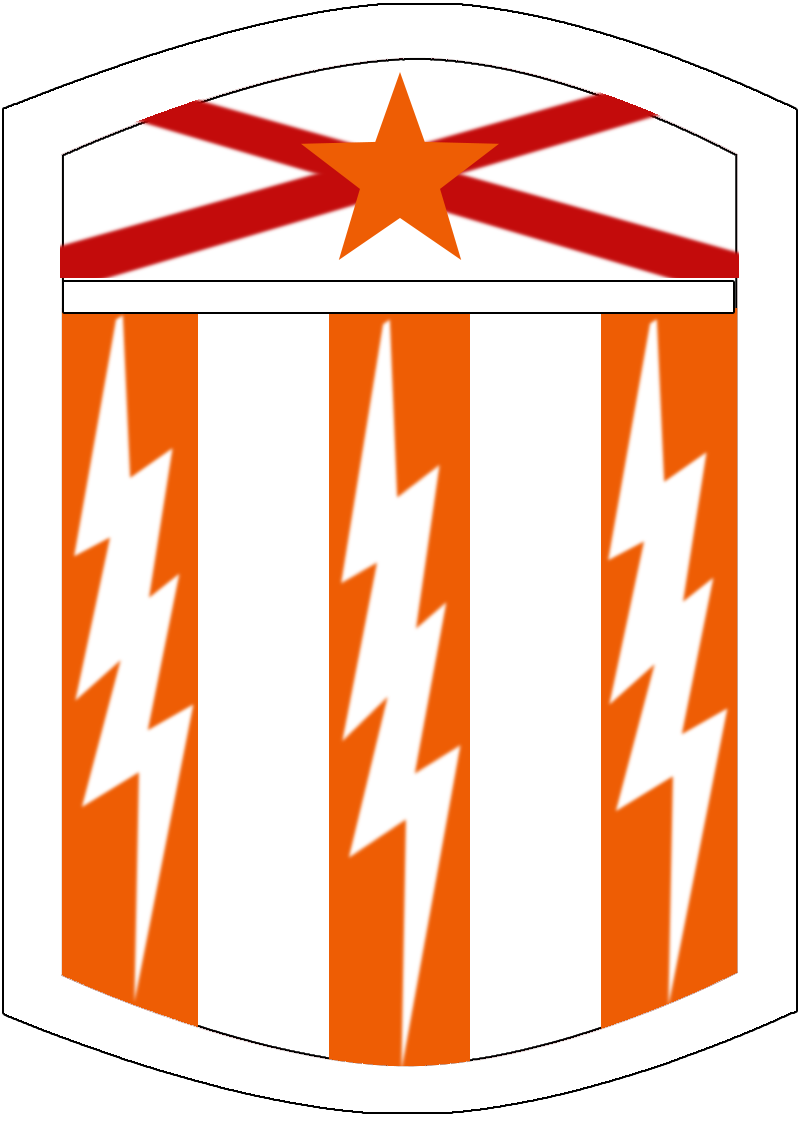
53rd Signal Brigade

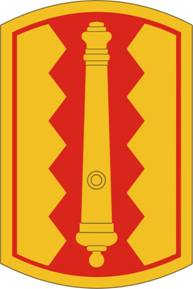
54th Field Artillery Brigade

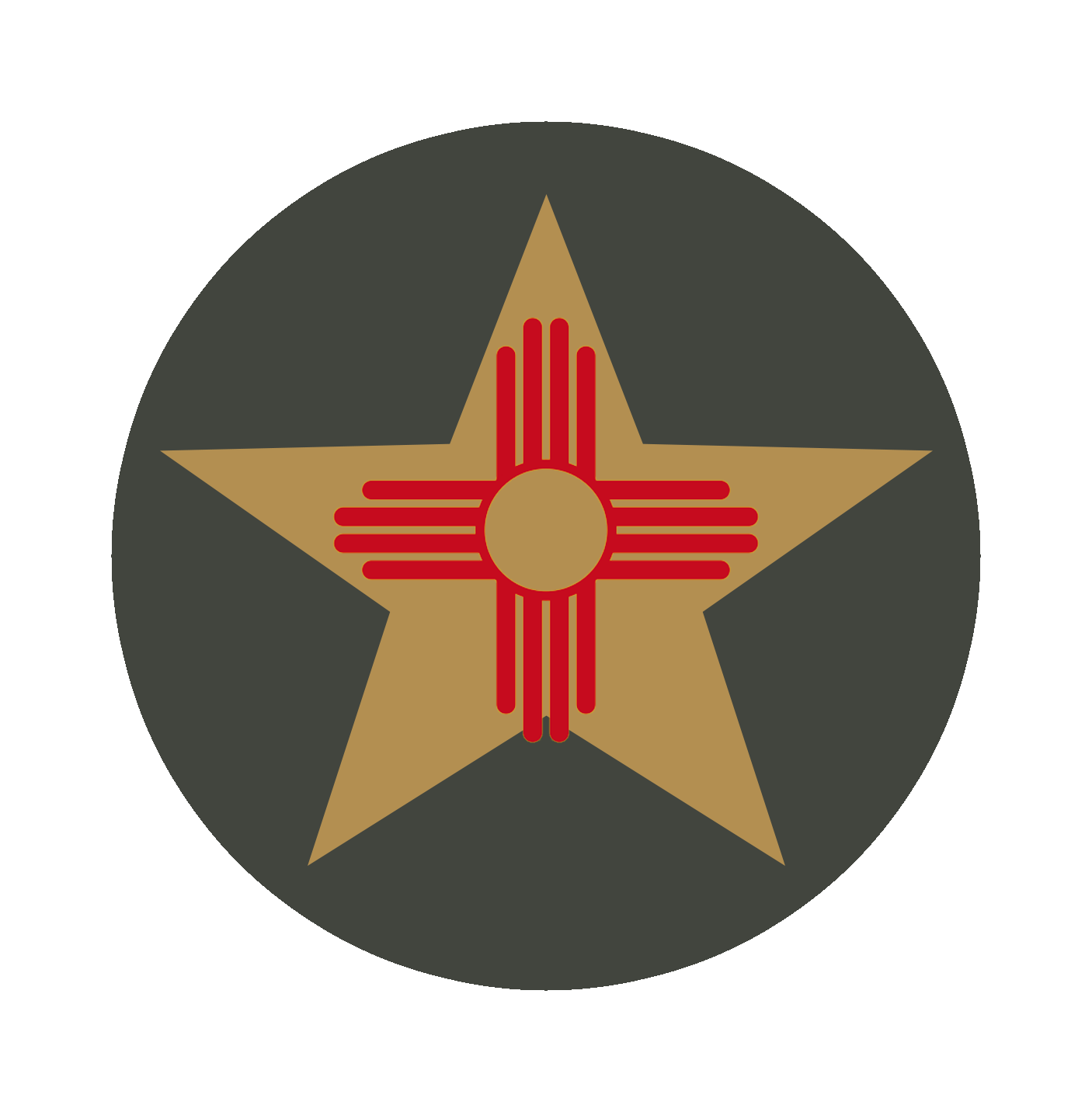
56th Cavalry Brigade 1921–1944

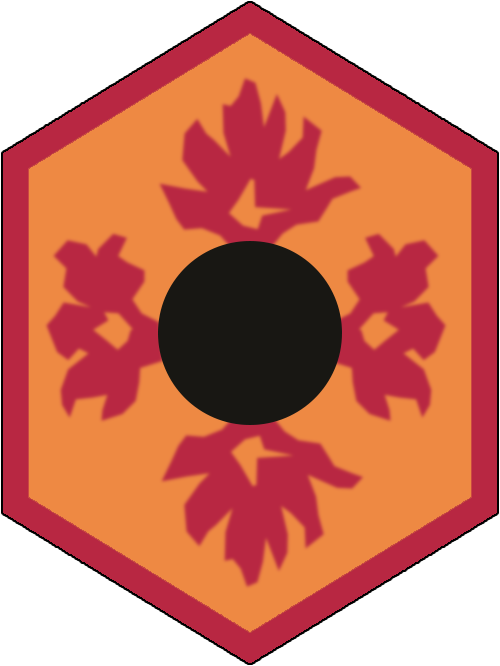
57th Ordnance Brigade 1965–1992

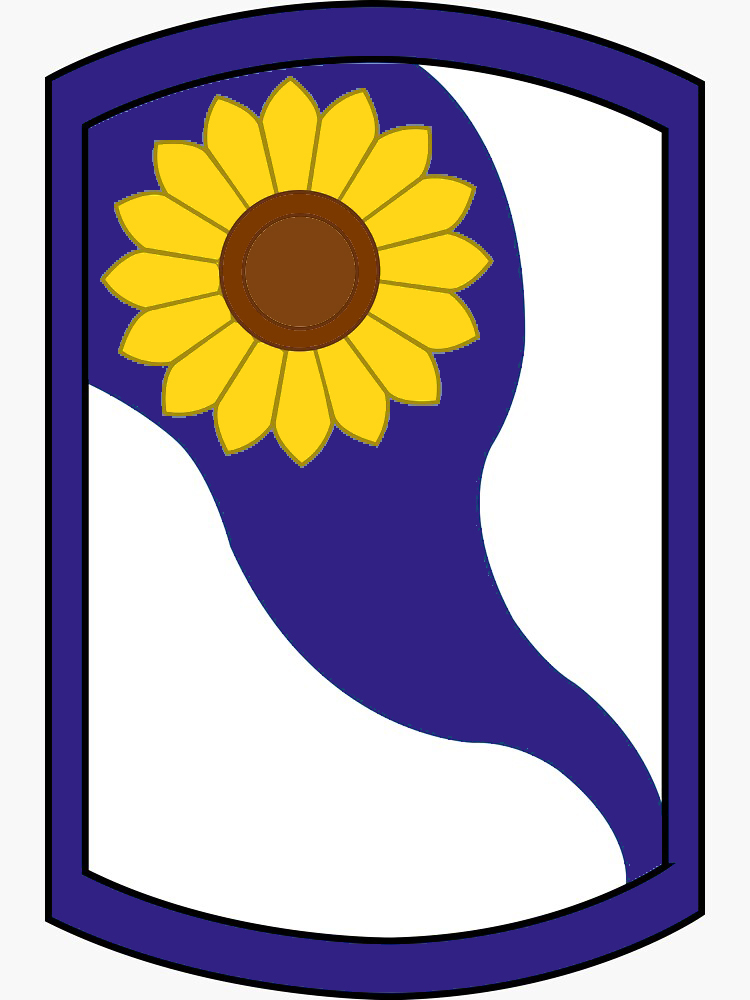
69th Infantry Brigade 1917–1997*

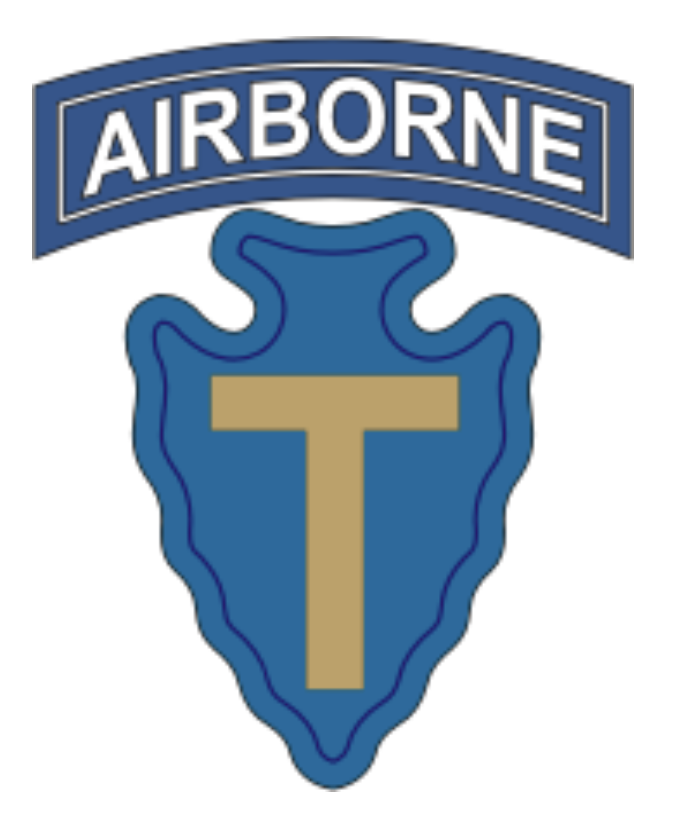
71st Airborne Brigade 1967–1973

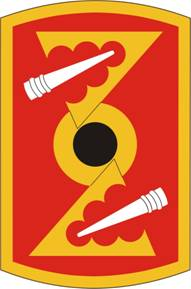
72nd Field Artillery Brigade 1917–2015*

72nd Infantry Brigade 1973–2004

73rd Infantry Brigade

79th Infantry Brigade

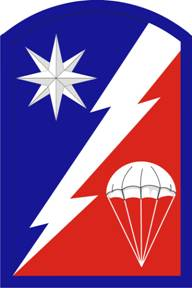
82nd Sustainment Brigade 1964–2006

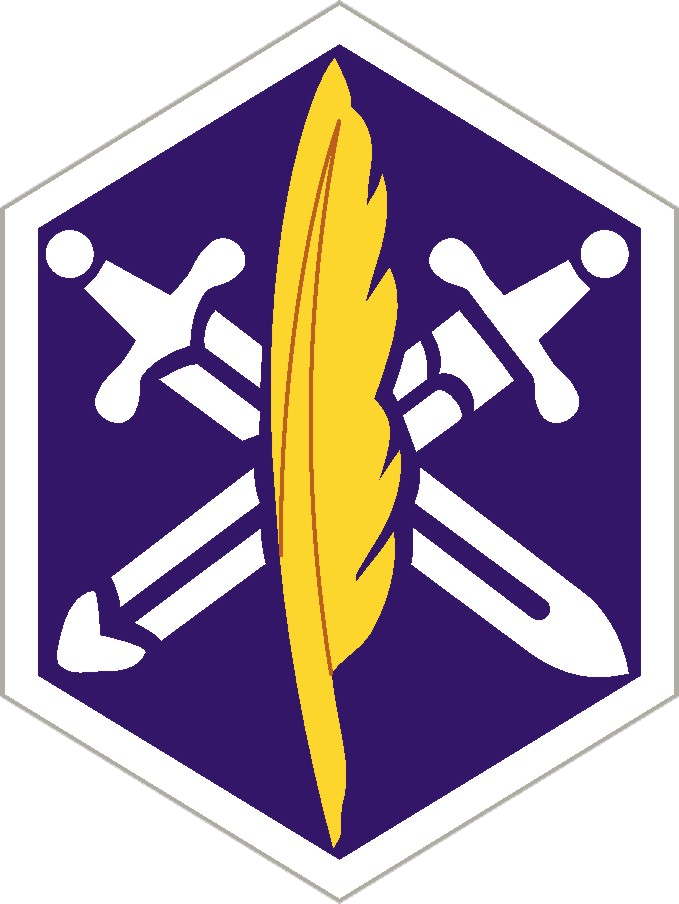
85th Civil Affairs Brigade 1976–2018

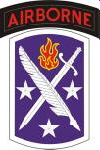
95th Civil Affairs Brigade

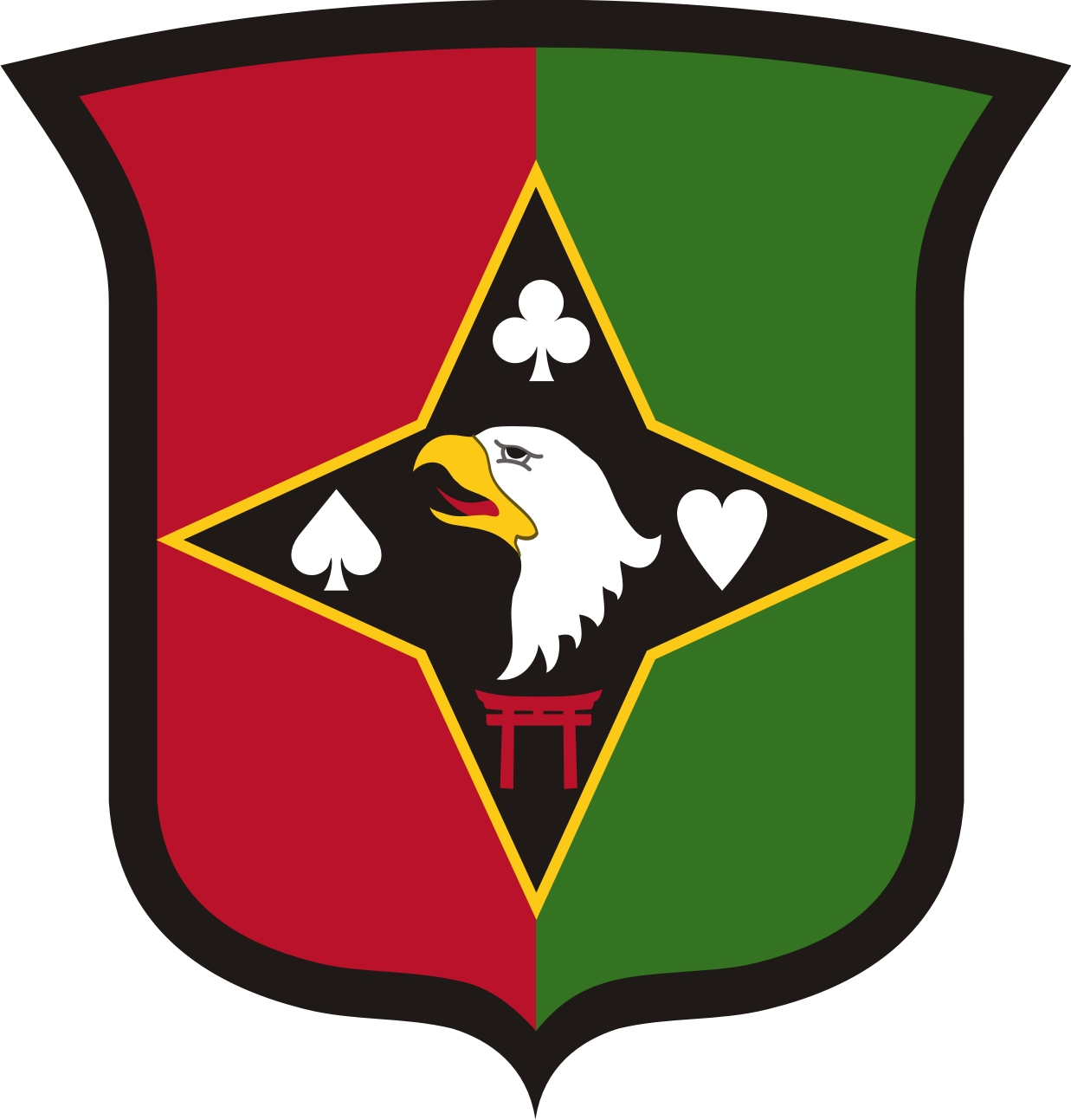
101st Sustainment Brigade

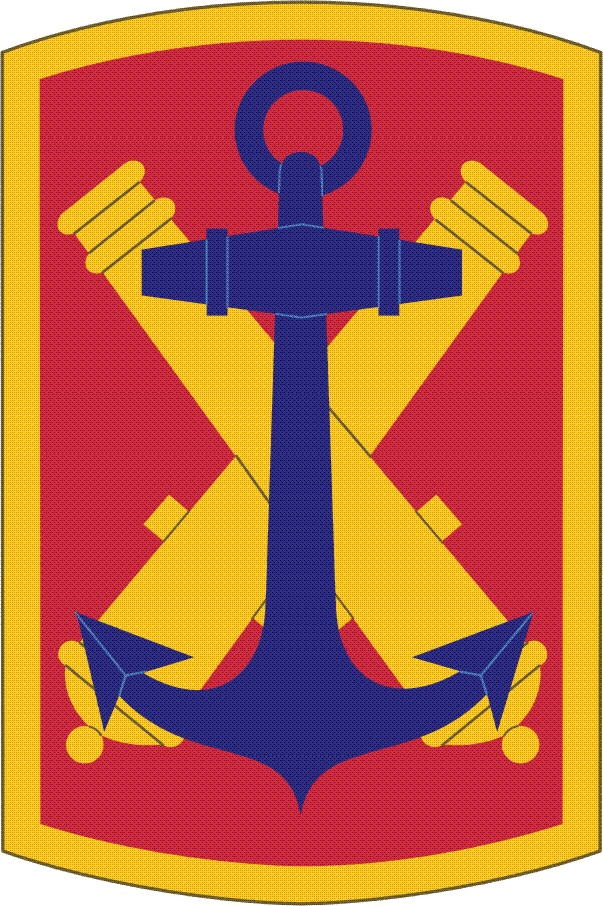
103rd Field Artillery Brigade

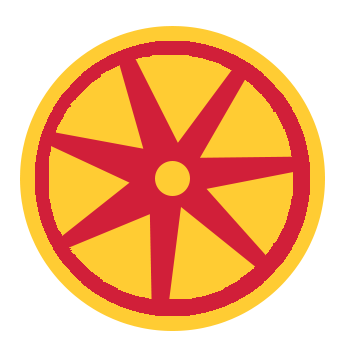
107th Transportation Brigade

108th Sustainment Brigade

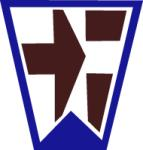
112th Medical Brigade 1917–1997

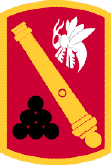
113th Field Artillery Brigade 1974–2008

116th Infantry Brigade

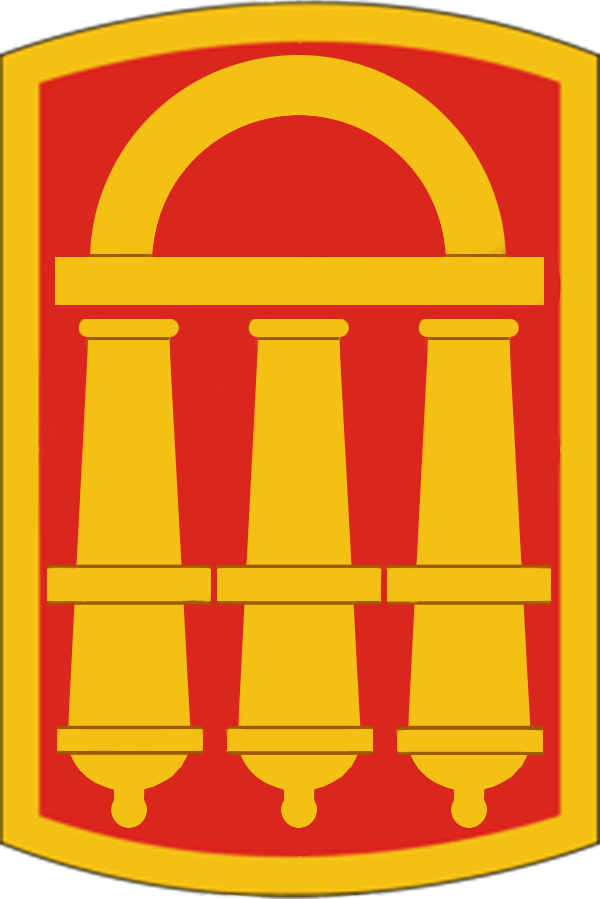
118th Field Artillery Brigade 1978–1992

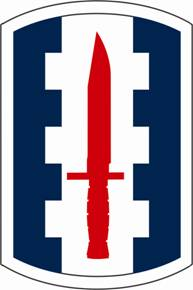
120th Infantry Brigade 1997–1999

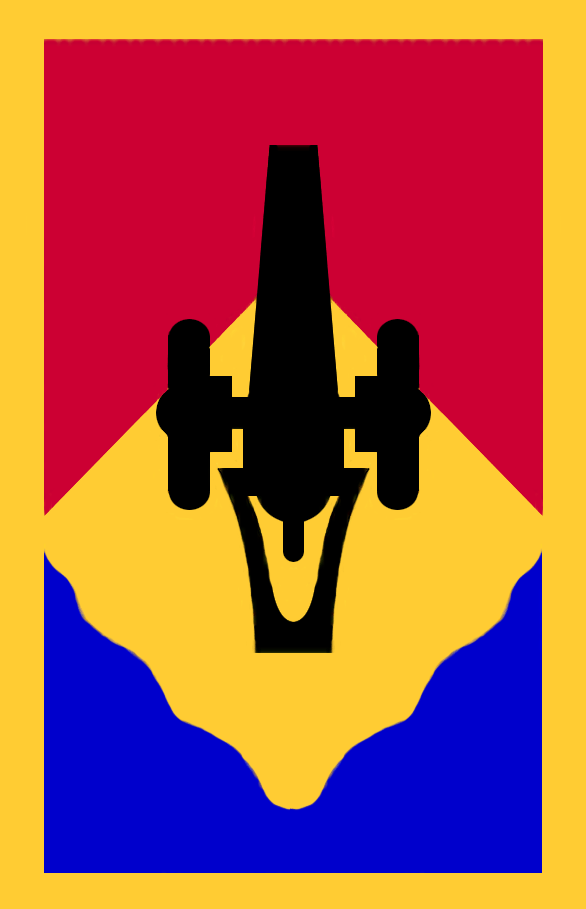
135th Field Artillery Brigade 1917–2008

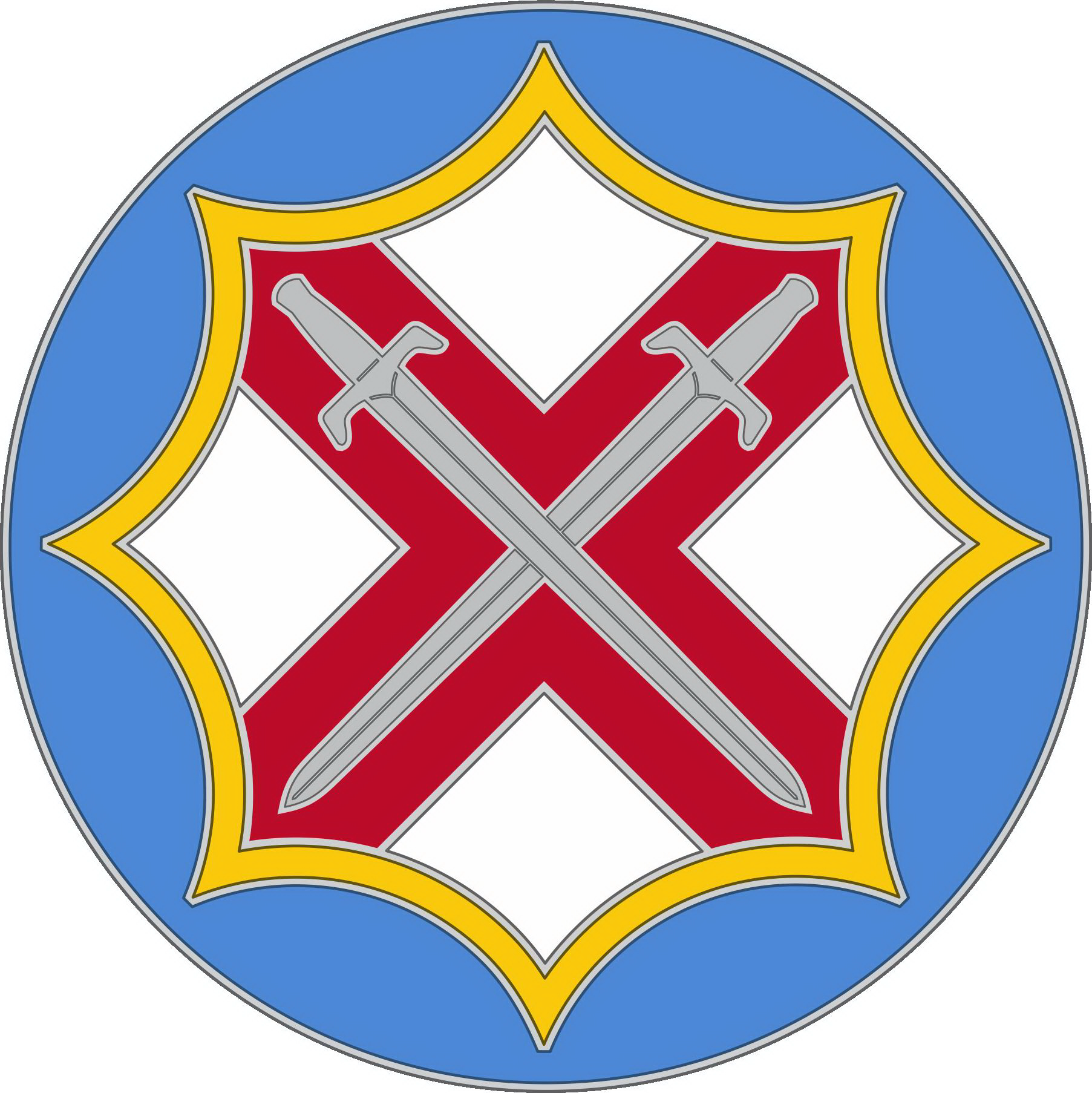
142nd Battlefield Surveillance Brigade 2009–2016

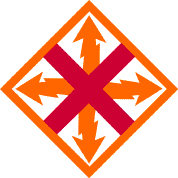
142nd Signal Brigade 1960–2008

151st Field Artillery Brigade 1880–2008

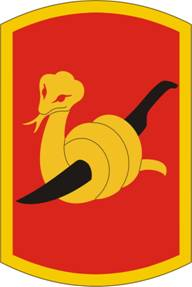
153 Field Artillery Brigade 1978-2010

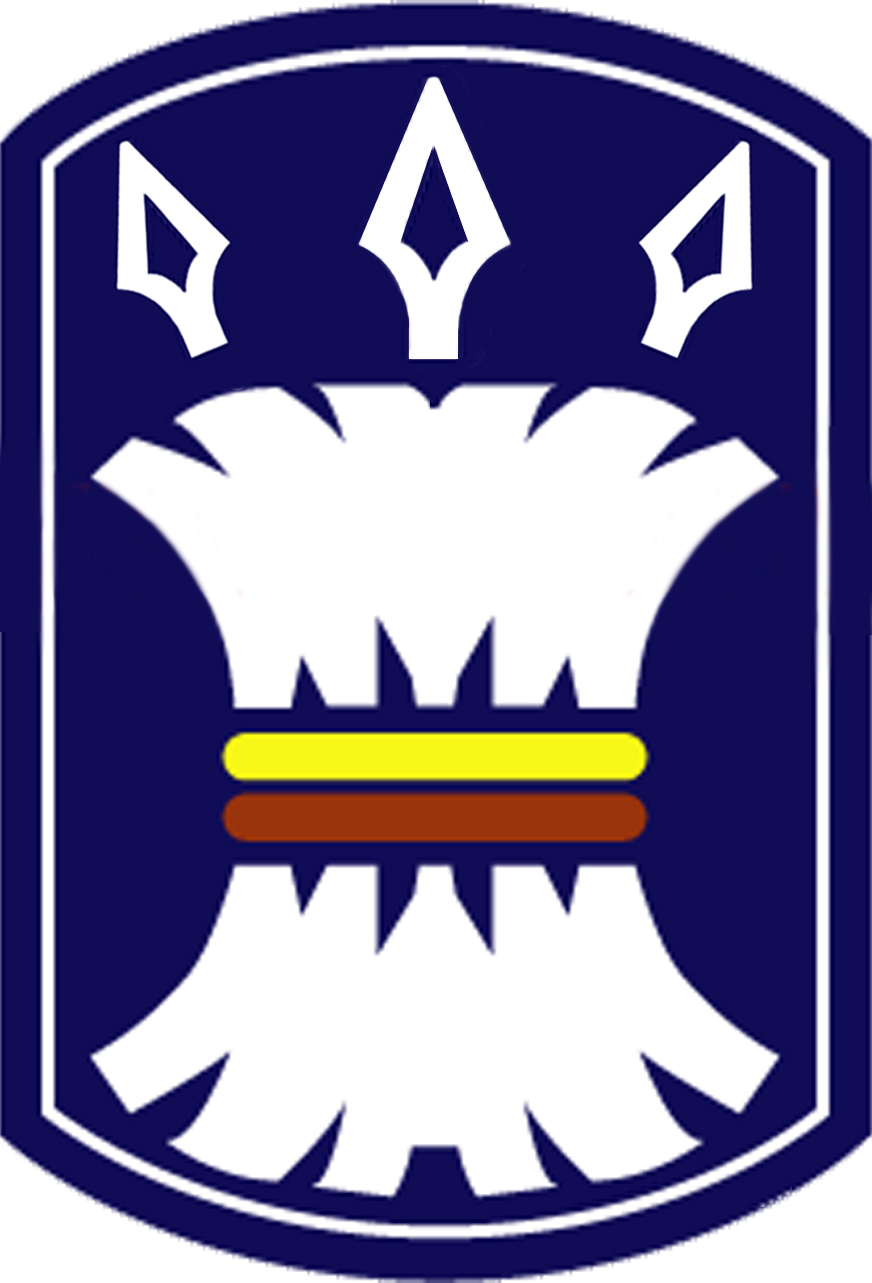
157th Infantry Brigade

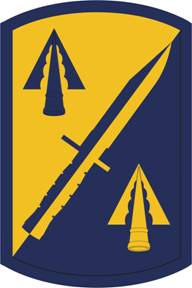
158th Infantry Brigade (Training) 1917–2015?*

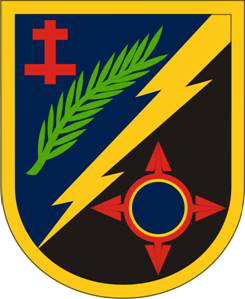
162nd Infantry Brigade 1917–2014*

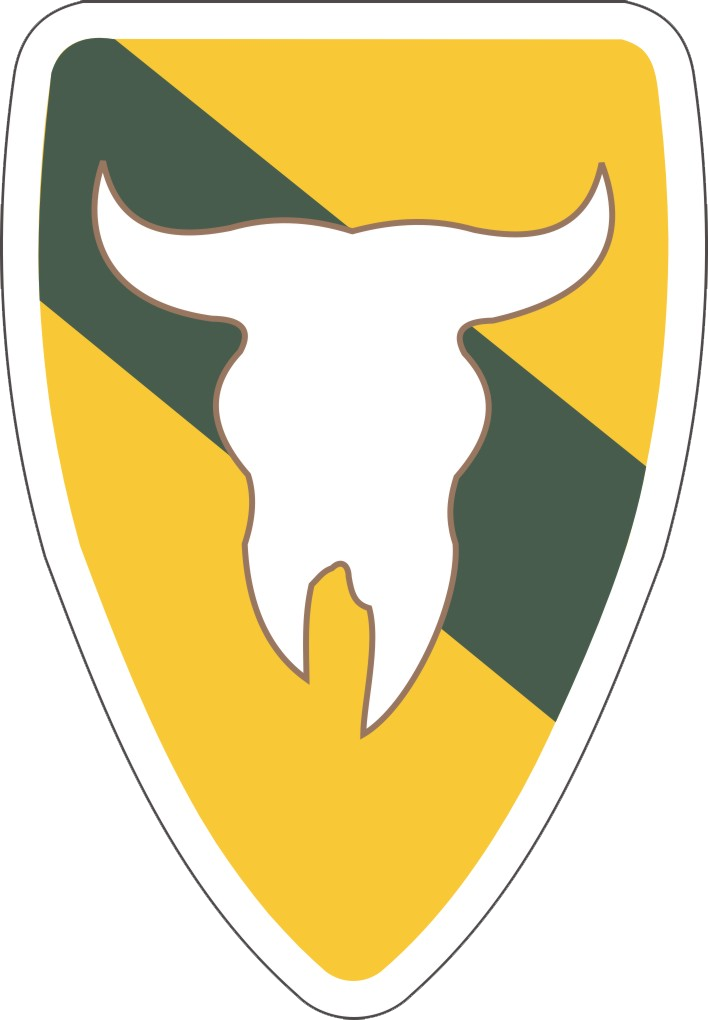
163rd Armored Cavalry Brigade

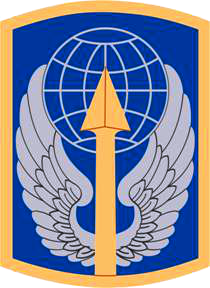
166th Aviation Brigade

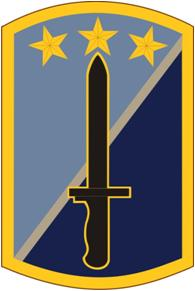
170th Infantry Brigade 1917–2012*

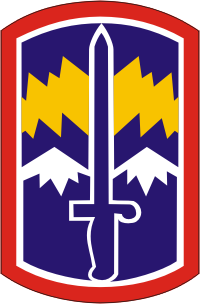
171st Infantry Brigade 1917–2016*

172nd Infantry Brigade 1917–2013*

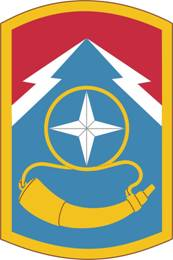
174th Infantry Brigade

175th Medical Brigade 1964–1992

177th Armored Brigade

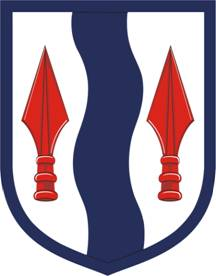
181st Infantry Brigade

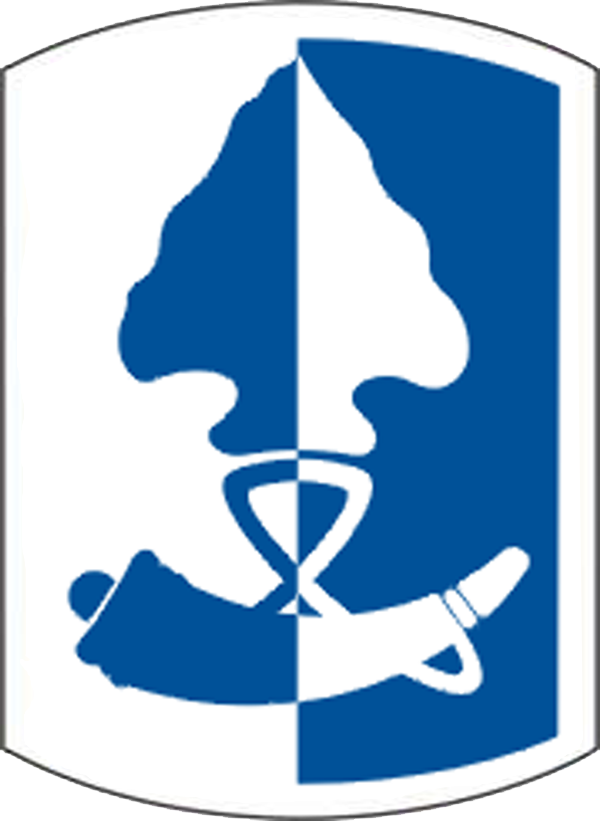
187th Infantry Brigade 1921–2007*

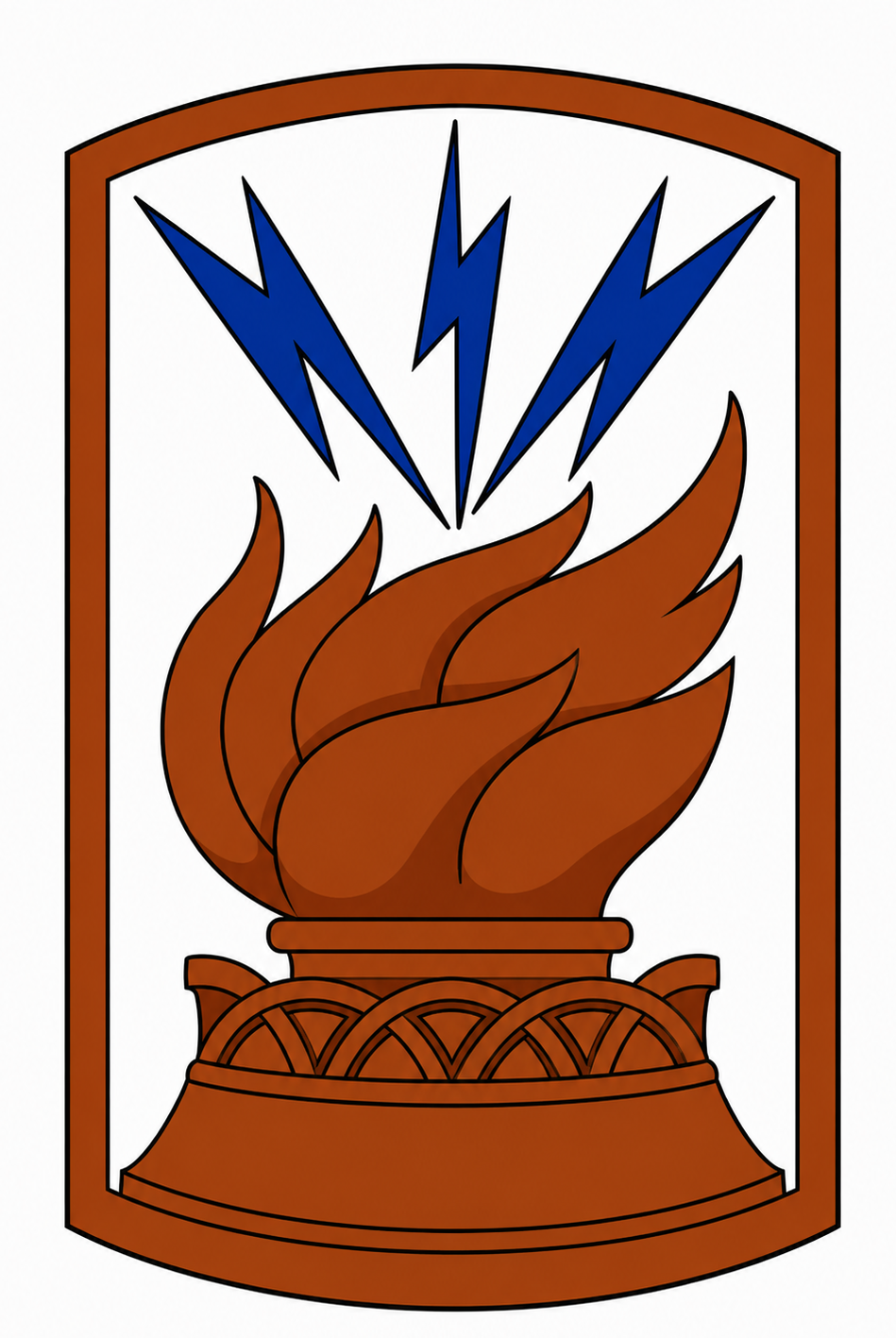
187th Signal Brigade 1968–1996

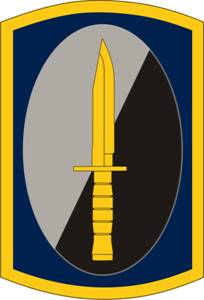
188th Infantry Brigade

189th Infantry Brigade

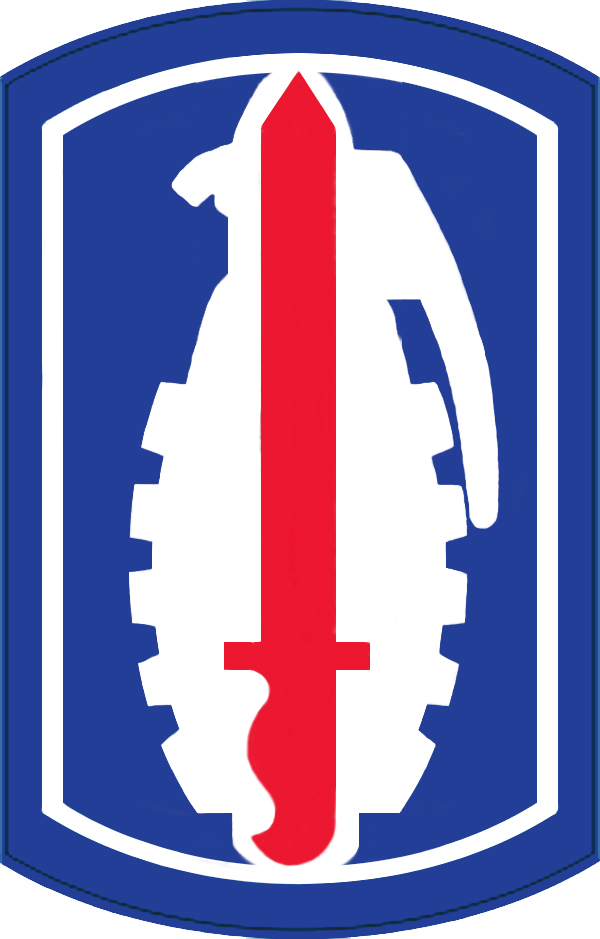
191st Infantry Brigade 2006–2014

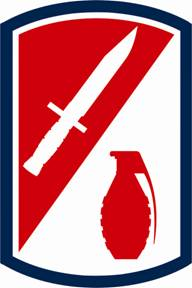
192nd Infantry Brigade 1942–2013*

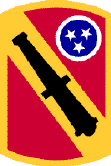
196th Field Artillery Brigade 1979–2008

205th Infantry Brigade 1921–2015*

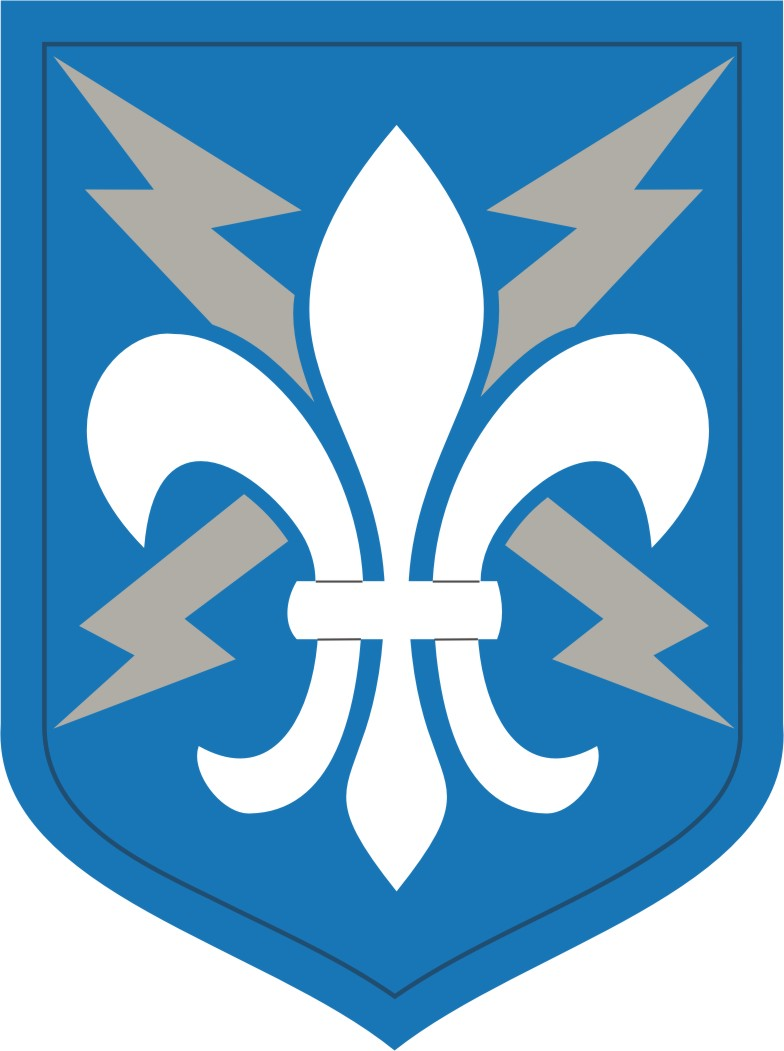
205th Military Intelligence Brigade 1944–2007

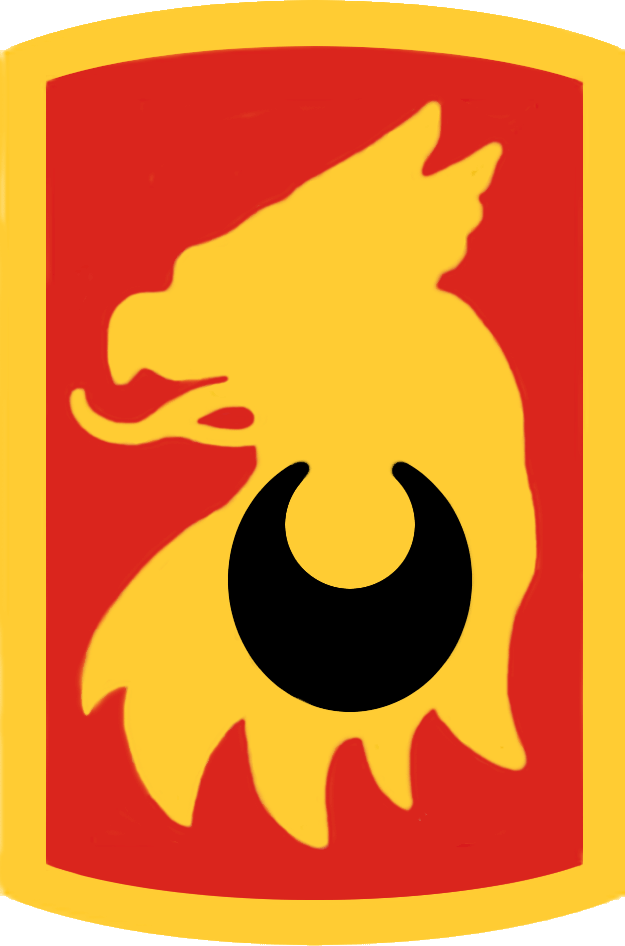
209th Field Artillery Brigade

212th Field Artillery Brigade 1944–2014

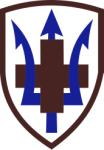
213th Medical Brigade 1972–1995

214th Fires Brigade 1944–2015

220th Military Police Brigade 1959–2006

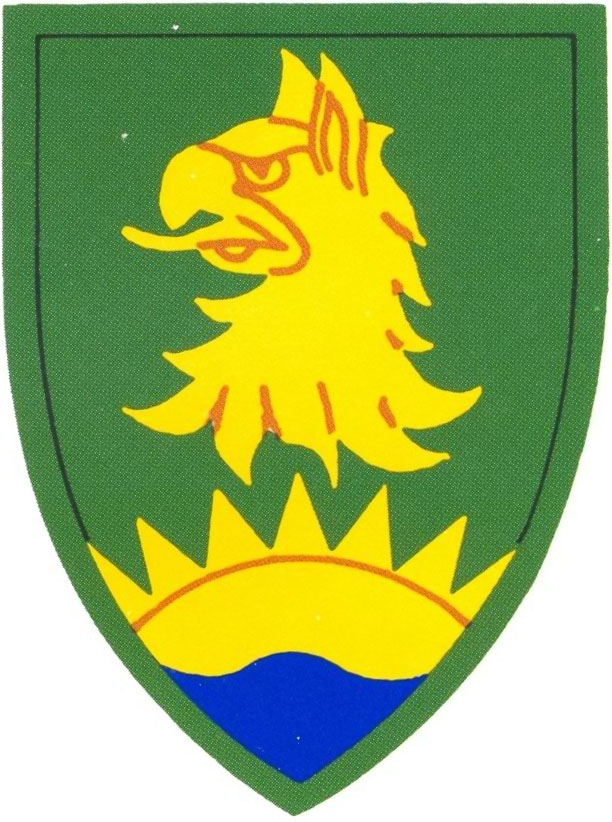
221st Military Police Brigade 1959–1994

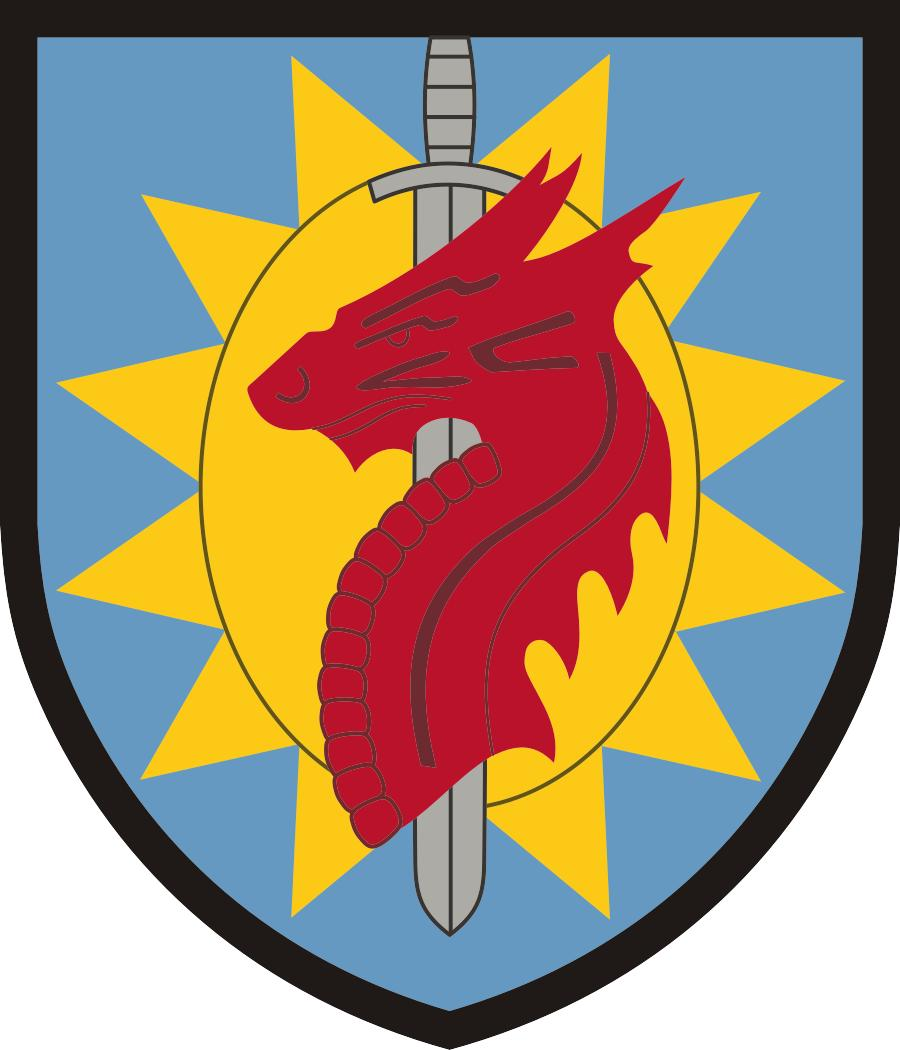
224th Sustainment Brigade

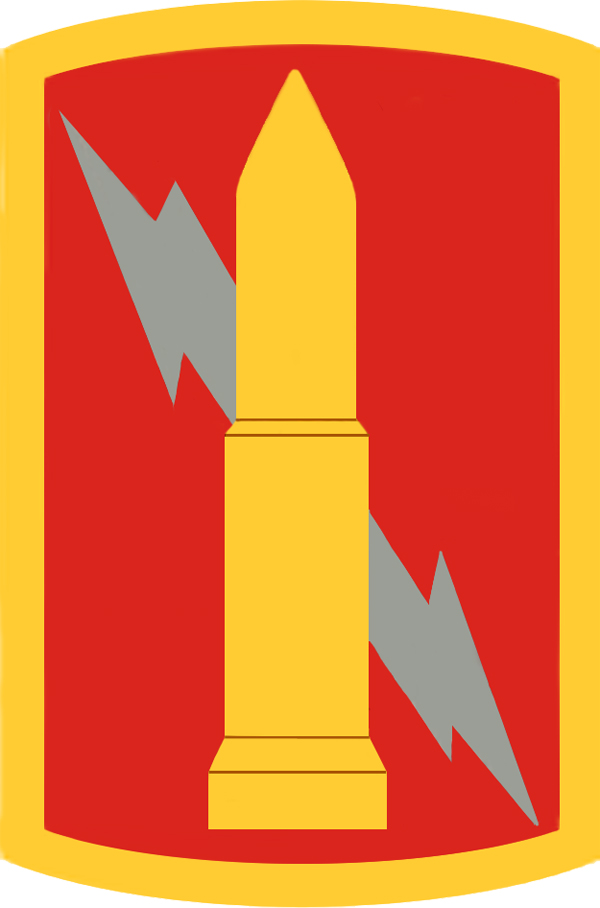
224th Field Artillery (Fires) Brigade

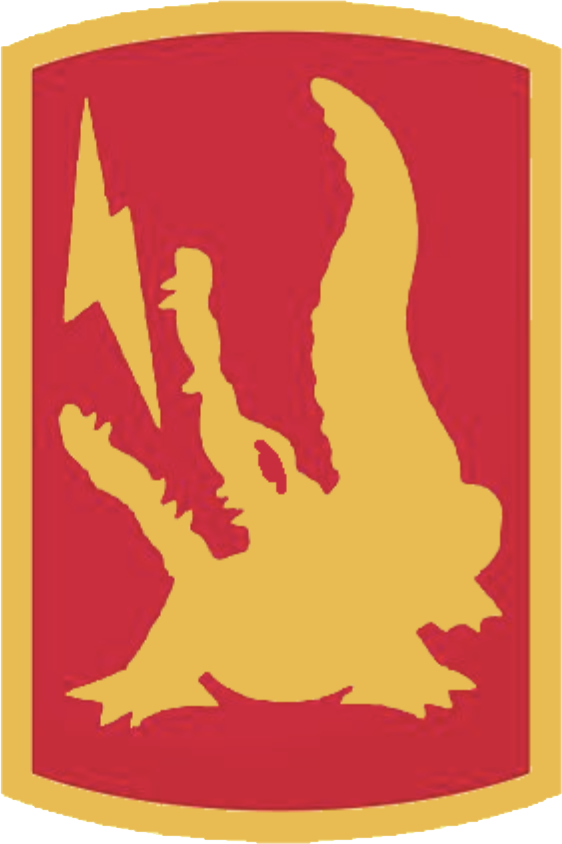
227th Field Artillery Brigade

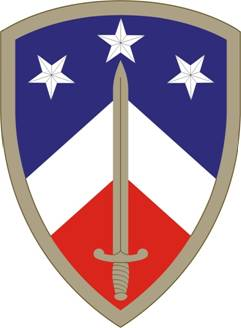
230th Sustainment Brigade 2007–2024

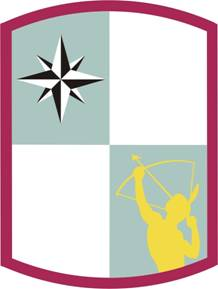
287th Sustainment Brigade 2005–2016

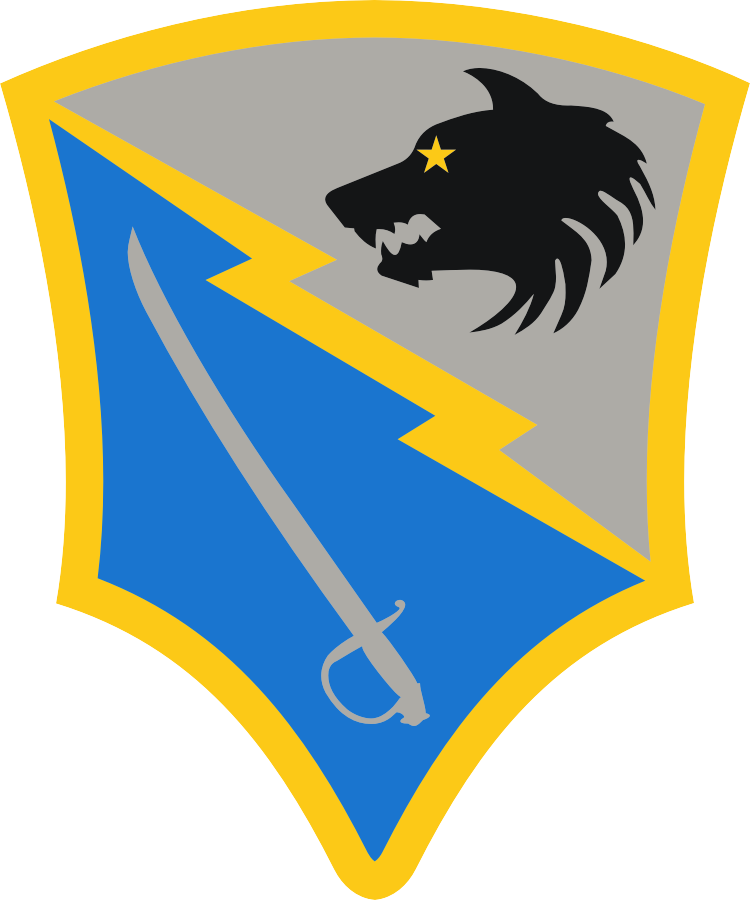
297th Battlefield Surveillance Brigade

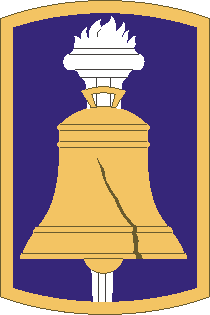
304th Civil Affairs Brigade

308th Civil Affairs Brigade

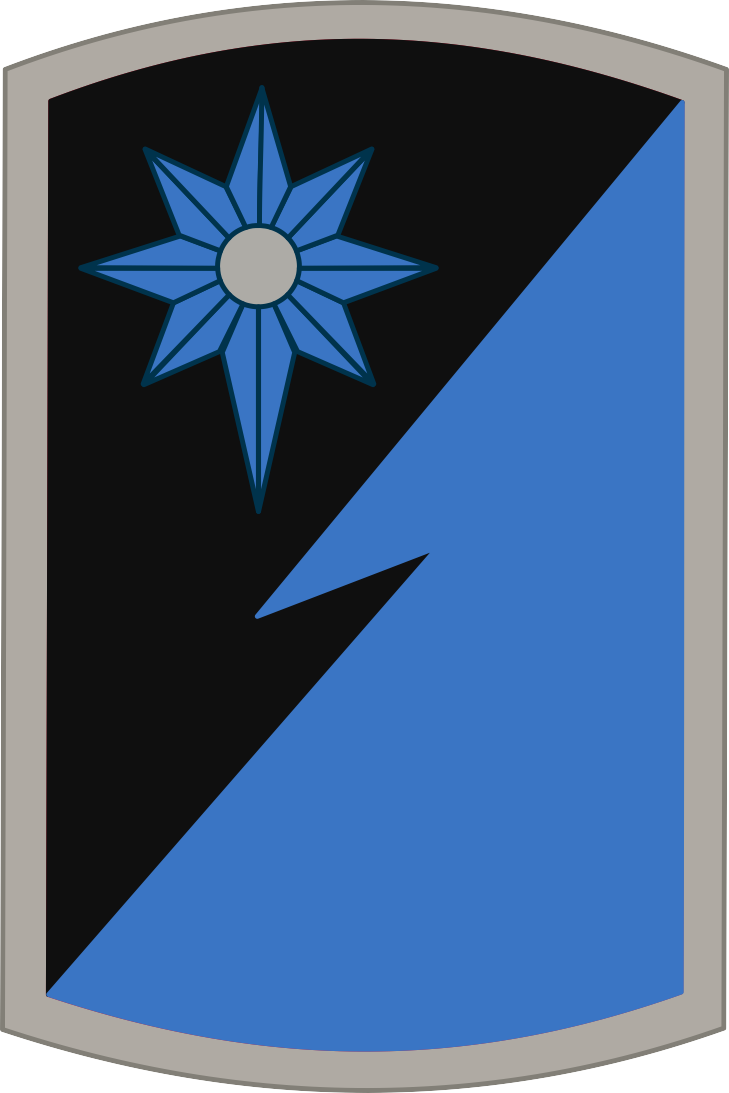
319th Military Intelligence Brigade 1948–1995

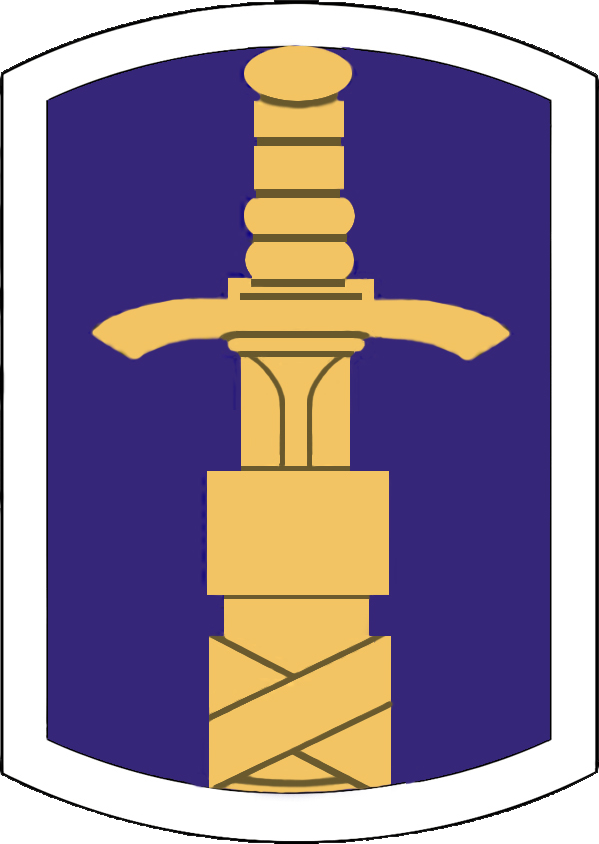
321st Civil Affairs Brigade

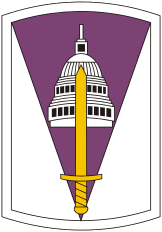
354th Civil Affairs Brigade

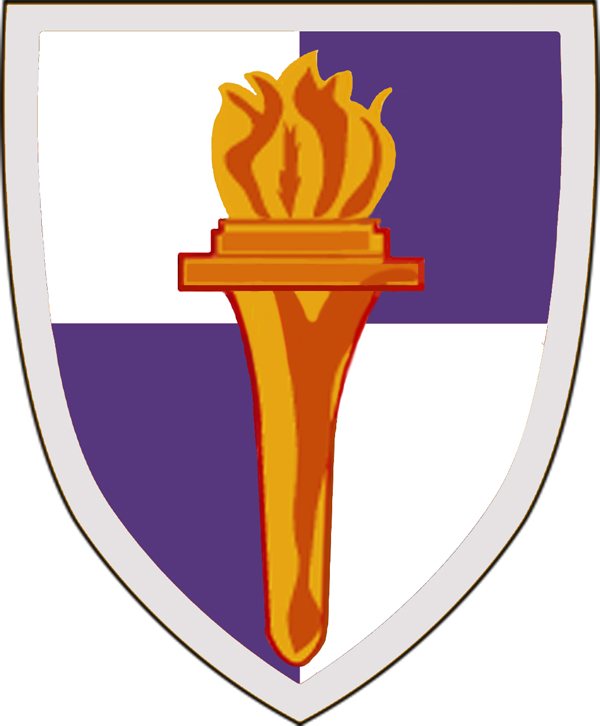
356th Civil Affairs Brigade

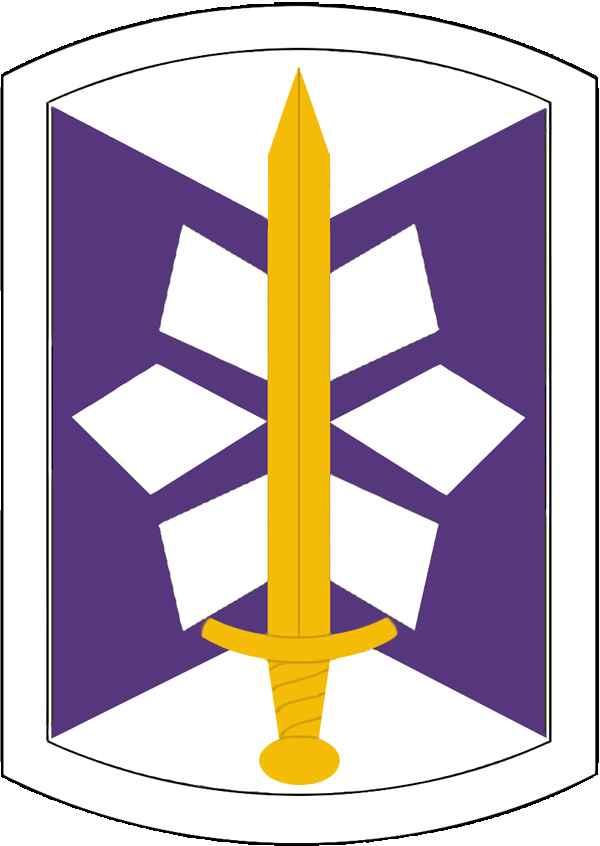
357th Civil Affairs Brigade

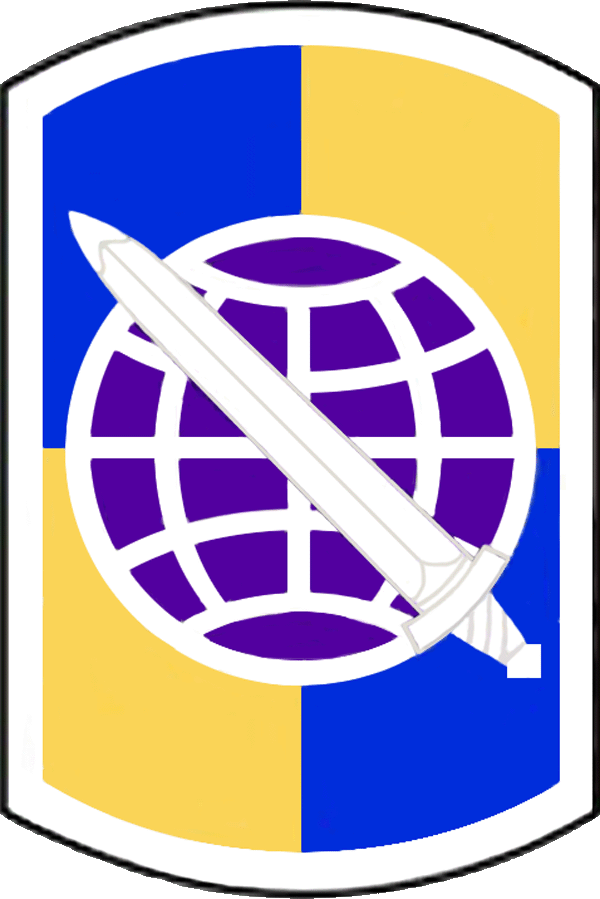
358th Civil Affairs Brigade

360th Civil Affairs Brigade

361st Civil Affairs Brigade 1966–2023

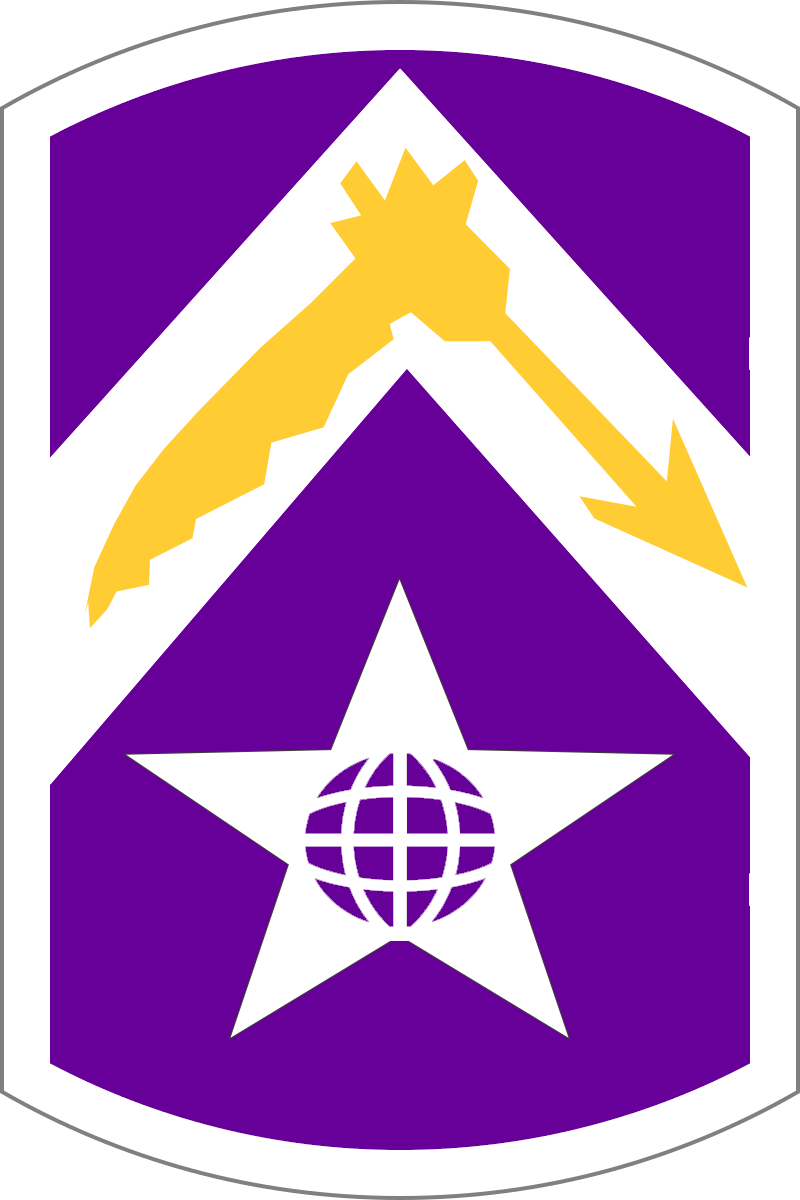
363rd Civil Affairs Brigade

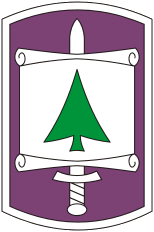
364th Civil Affairs Brigade

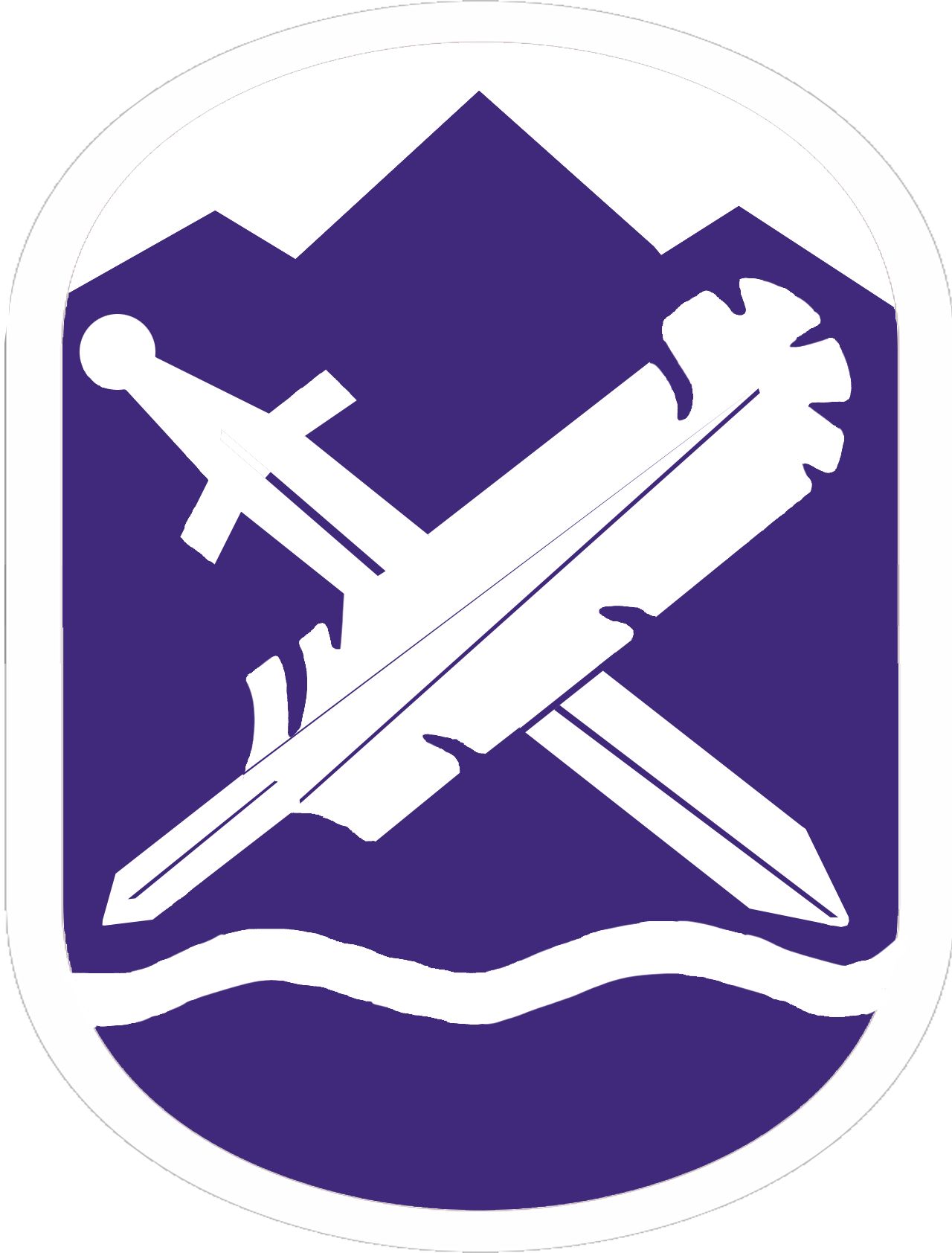
365th Civil Affairs Brigade

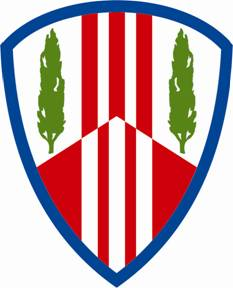
369th Sustainment Brigade

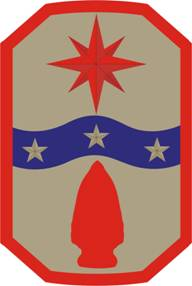
371st Sustainment Brigade 2007–2025

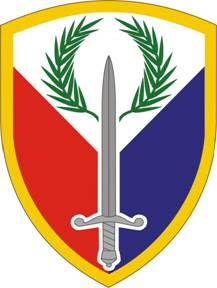
401st Army Field Support Brigade 2006–2010

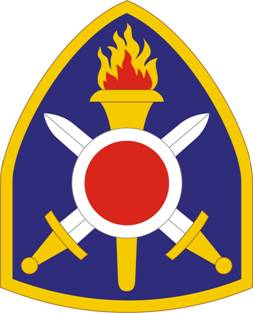
402nd Field Artillery Brigade 1985–2015*

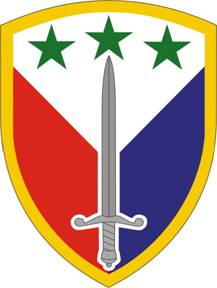
402nd Support Brigade 2006–2010

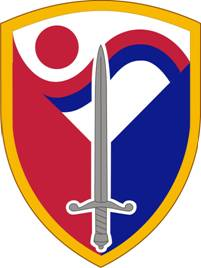
403rd Army Field Support Brigade 2006–2010

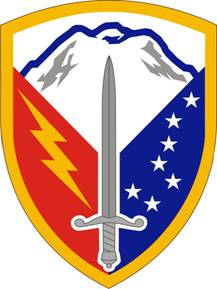
404th Support Brigade 2008–2010

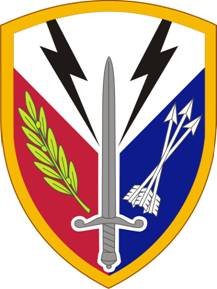
405th Army Field Support Brigade

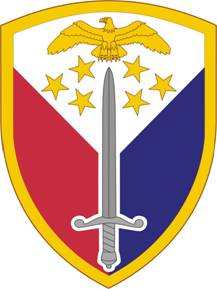
406th Support Brigade 2007–2010

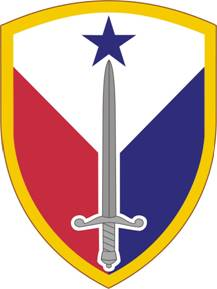
407th Support Brigade 2007–2010

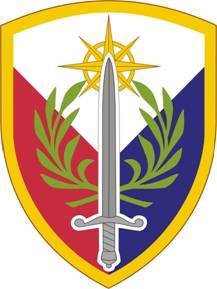
408th Contracting Support Brigade 2007–2010

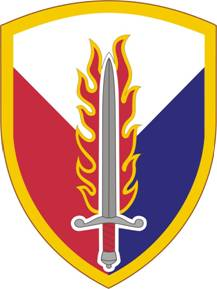
409th Contracting Support Brigade

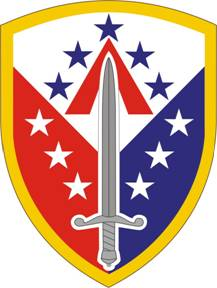
410th Contracting Support Brigade 2007–2010

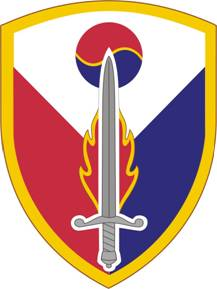
411th Contracting Support Brigade 2008–2010

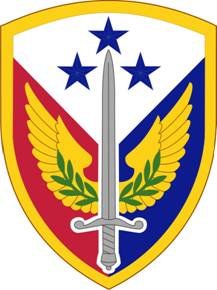
412th Contracting Support Brigade 2009–2017

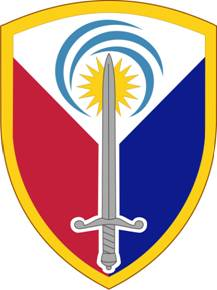
413th Contracting Support Brigade

425th Transportation Brigade

426th Medical Brigade 1943–2008*

460th Chemical Brigade

464th Chemical Brigade 1953–2008

479th Field Artillery Brigade 1944–2015*

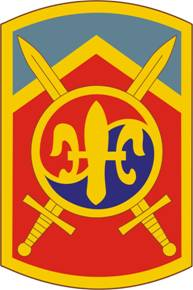
501st Sustainment Brigade

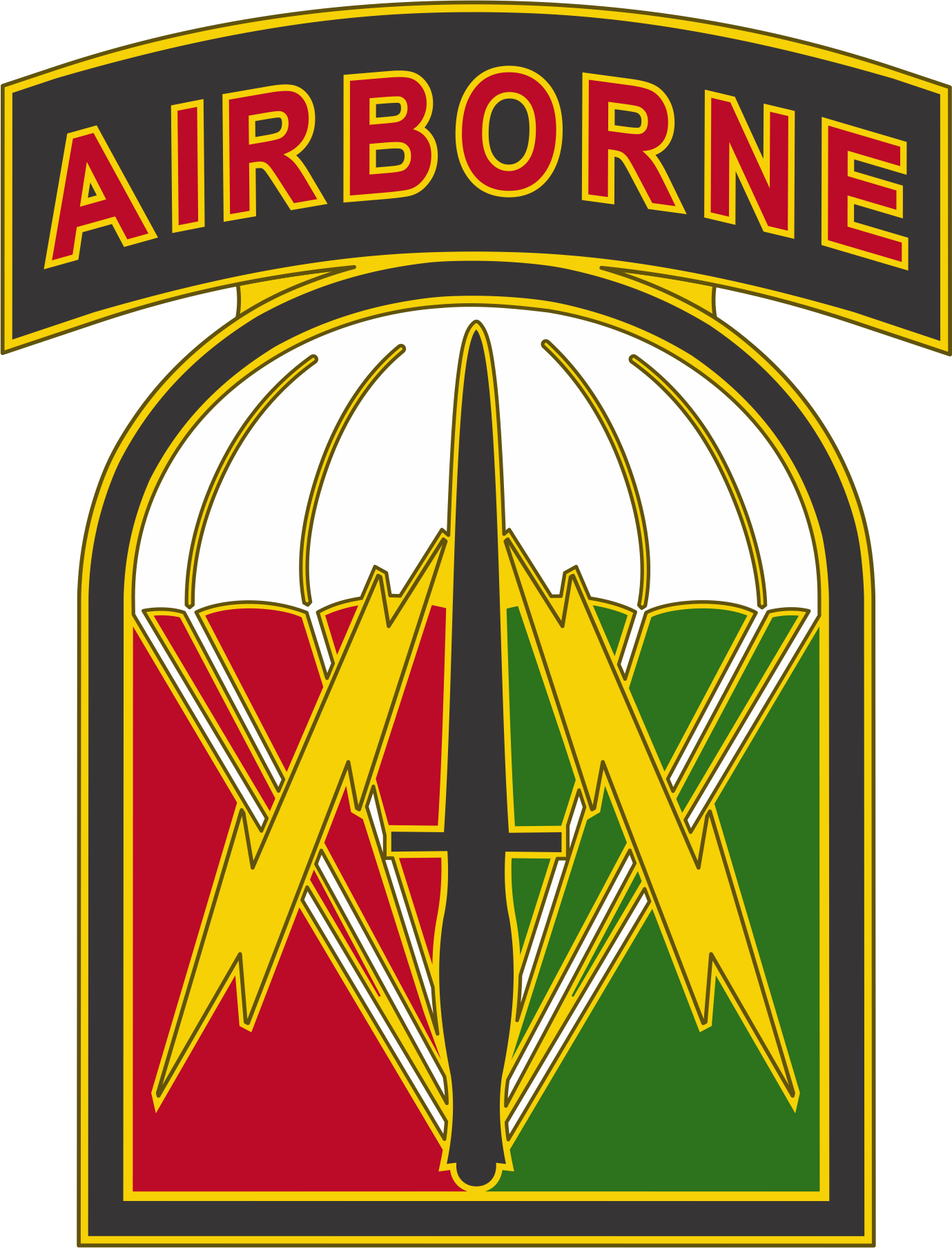
528th Sustainment Brigade

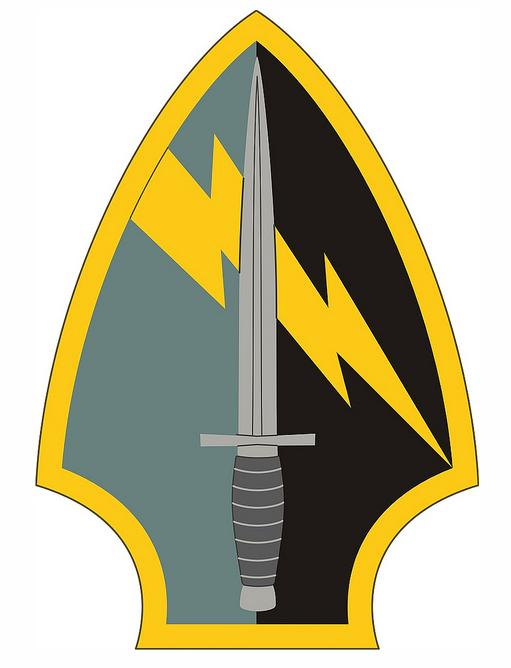
560th Battlefield Surveillance Brigade 2007–2018

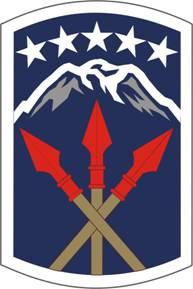
593rd Sustainment Brigade 1973–2015

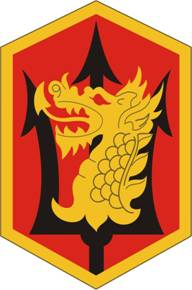
631st Field Artillery Brigade 1917–2008

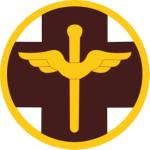
818th Medical Brigade 1944–1996*

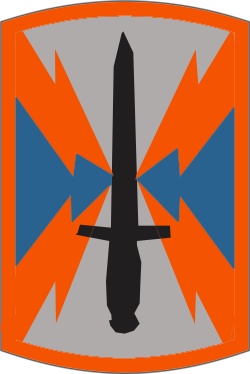
1101st Signal Brigade 1988–1992

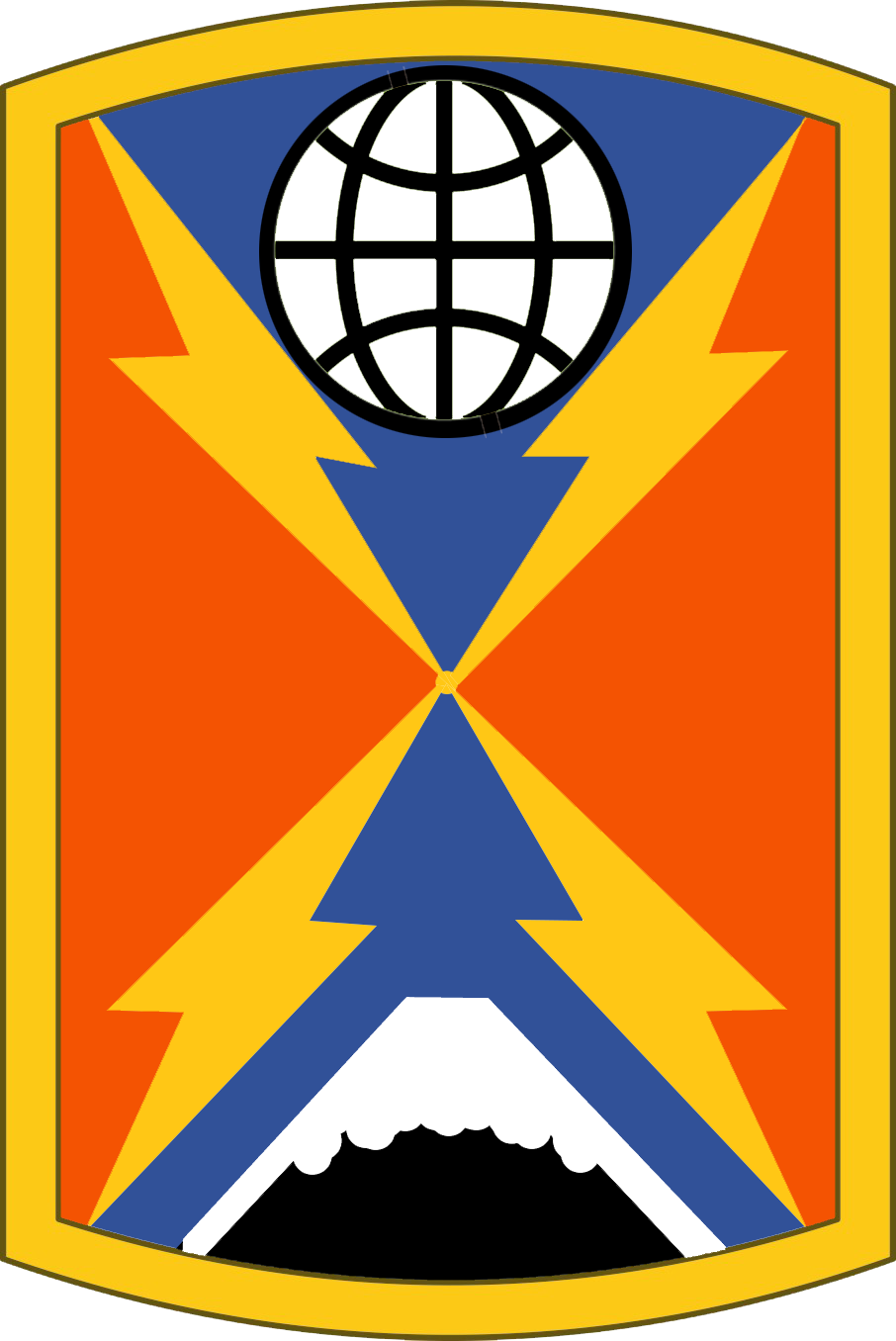
1104th Signal Brigade 1989–1991

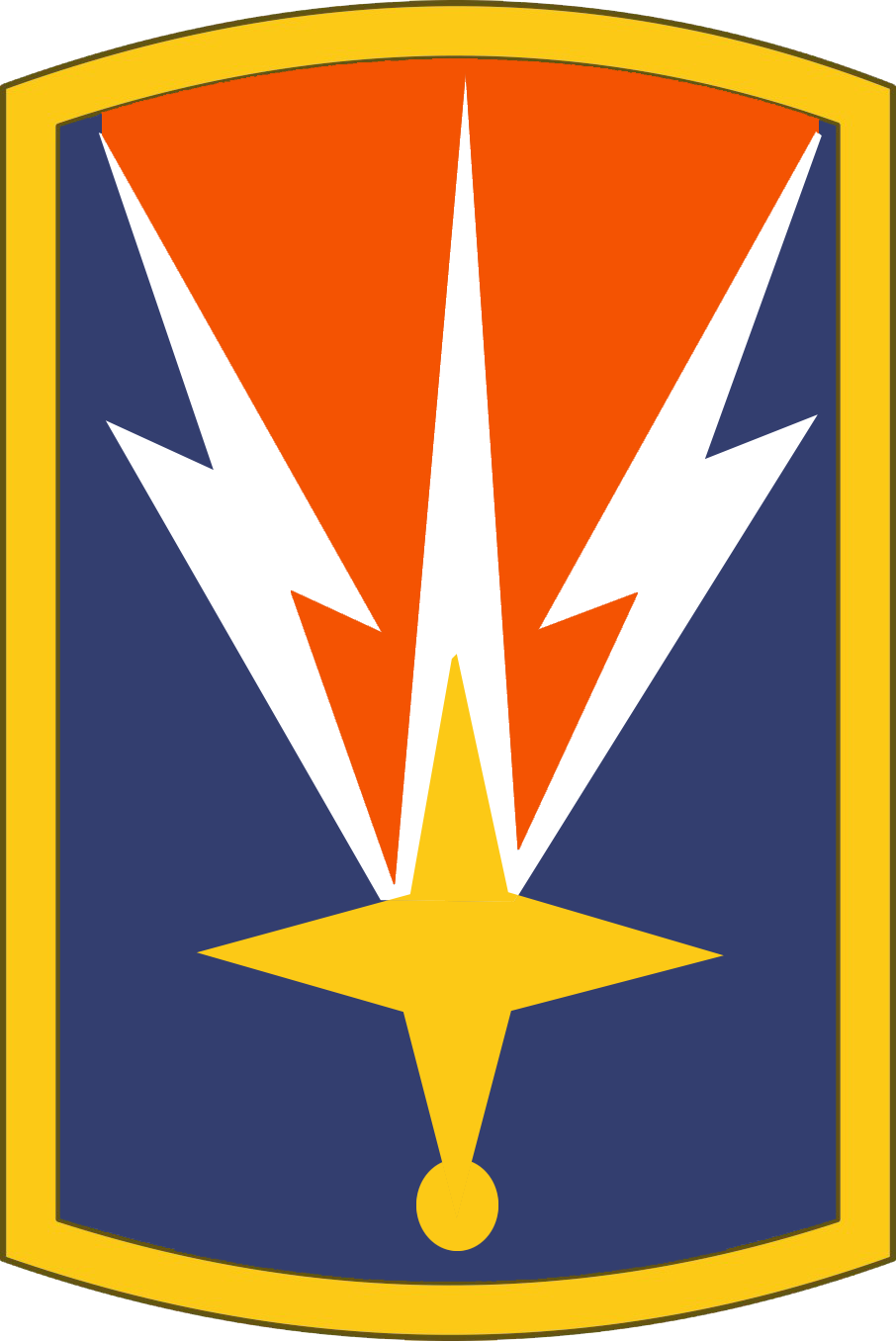
1107th Signal Brigade 1989–1991

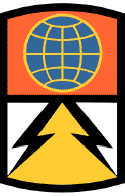
1108th Signal Brigade 1988–2003

== Non-numbered brigades ==
Berlin Brigade

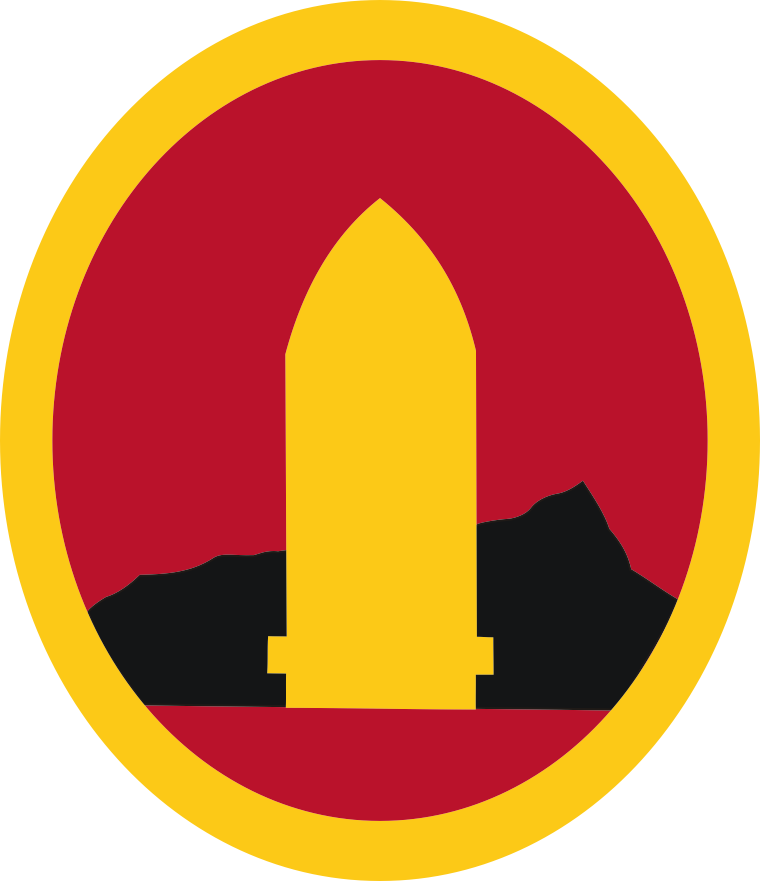
Hawaiian Coastal Artillery Brigade 1936–1945

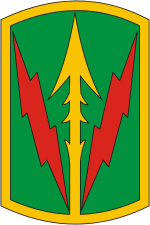
Military Police Brigade Hawaii

== Coastal artillery districts (1920s) ==
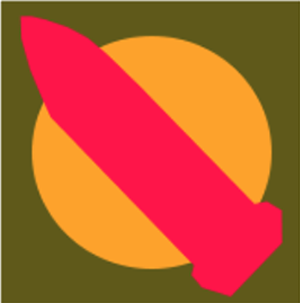
1st Coastal Artillery District

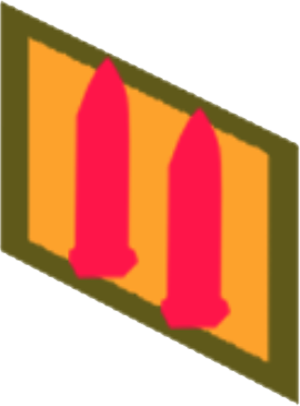
2nd Coastal Artillery District

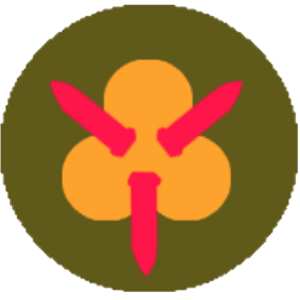
3rd Coastal Artillery District

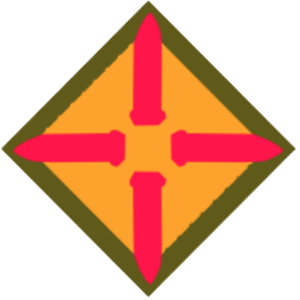
4th Coastal Artillery District

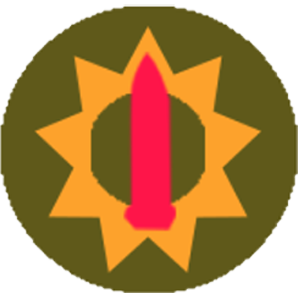
9th Coastal Artillery District

== Numbered commands ==
I Field Force, Vietnam 1966–1971

II Field Force, Vietnam 1966–1971

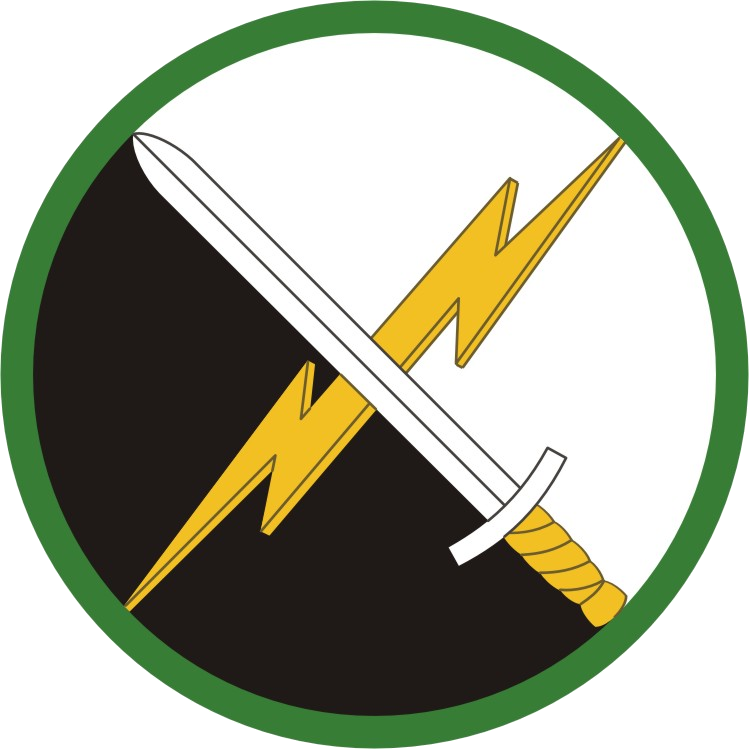
1st Information Operations Command 2002–2025

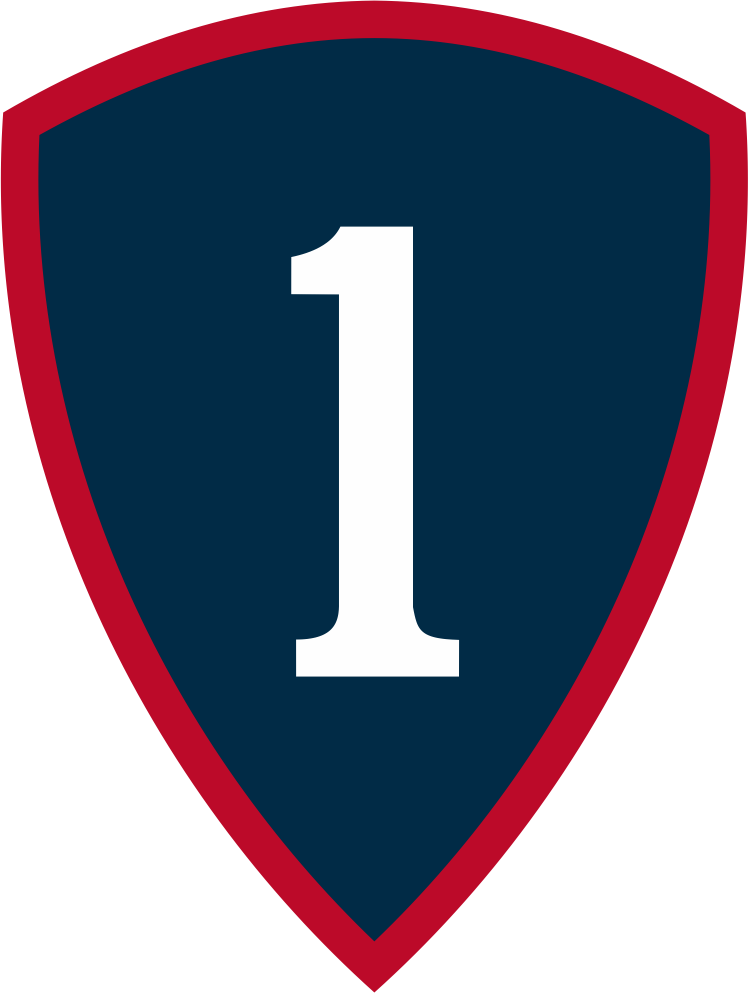
1st Personnel Command 1978–2008

1st Signal Command 1967–1969

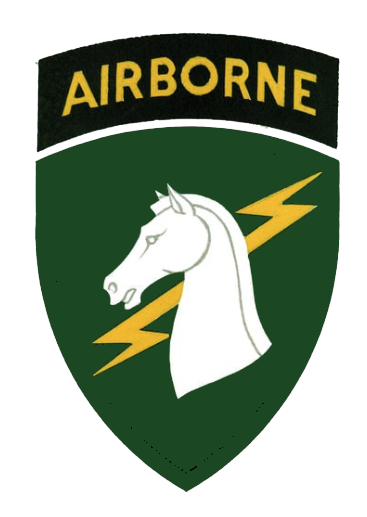
1st Special Operations Command 1982–1990

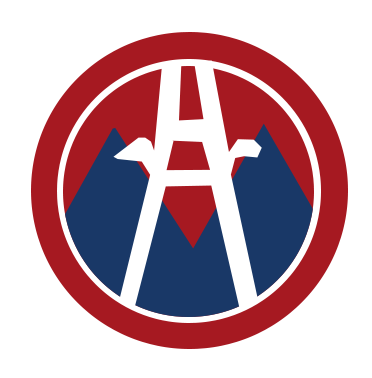
2nd Logistical Command 1950–1966

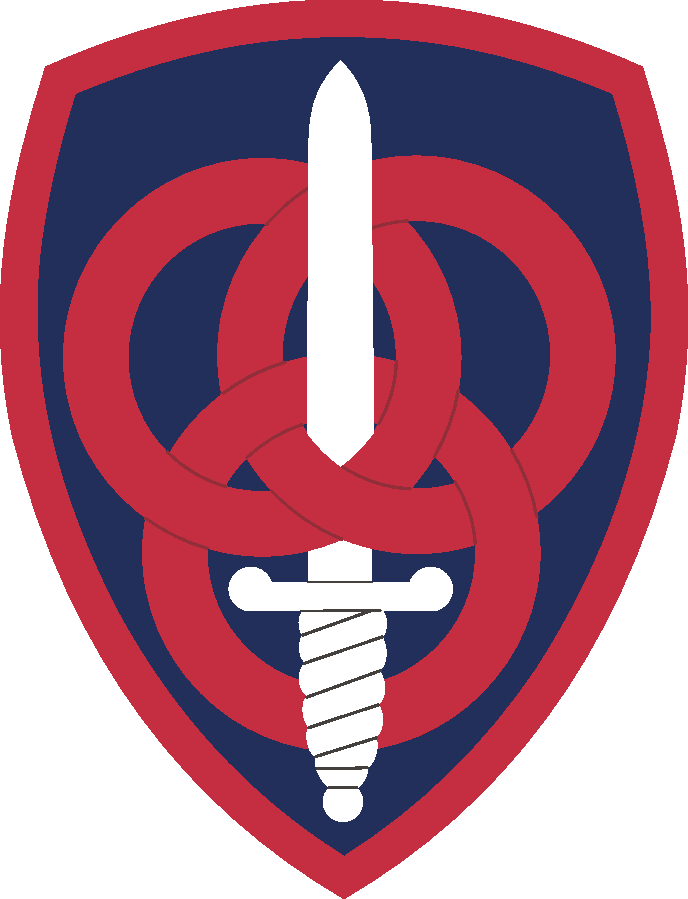
3rd Personnel Command 1991–2014

3rd Sustainment Command 1950–2025

4th Transportation Command (Terminal) 1942–1989**

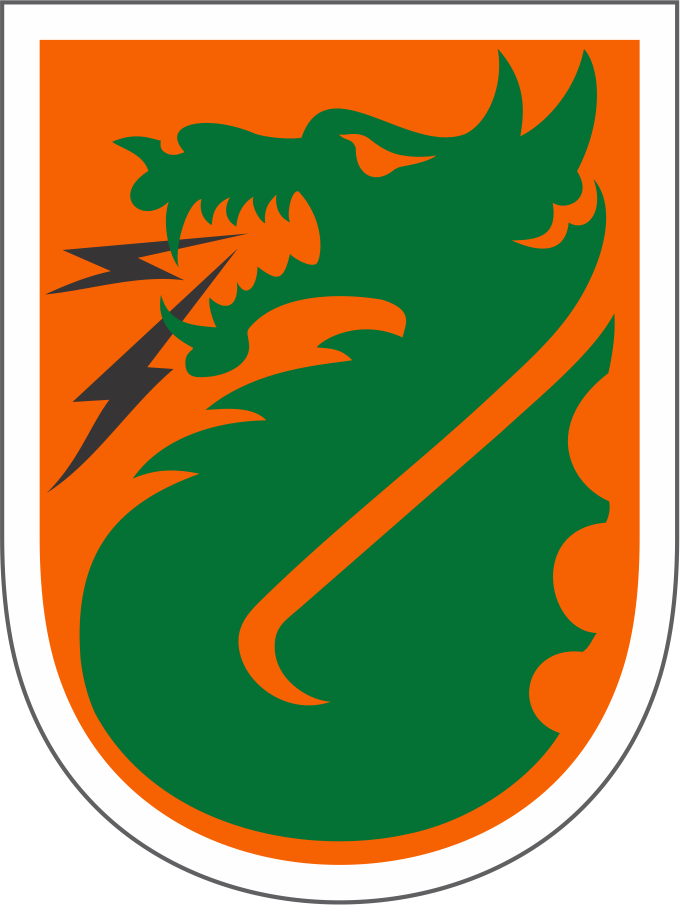
5th Signal Command 1974–2017

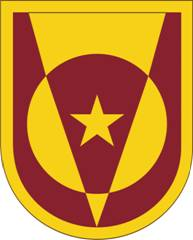
5th Transportation Command (Terminal) 1966–1971

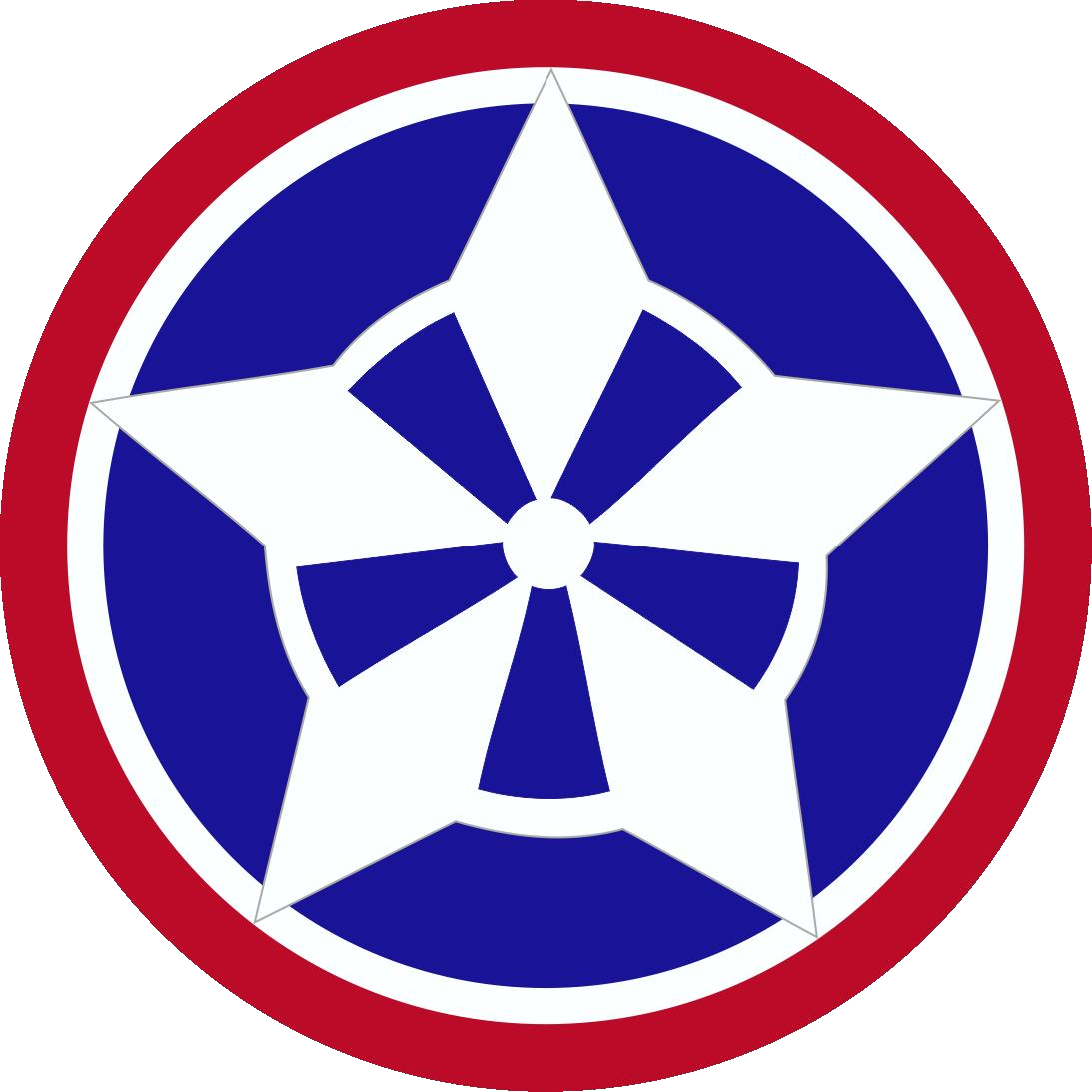
5th Logistical Command 1958–1962

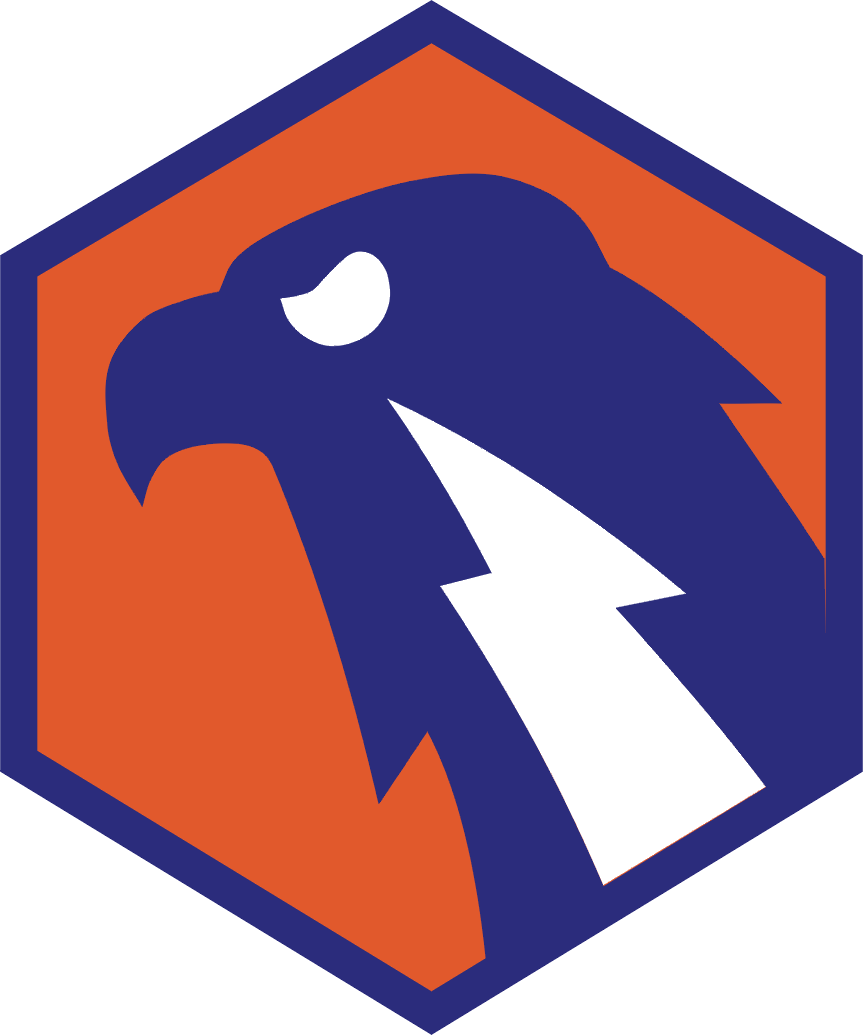
6th Signal Command 1974–1992*

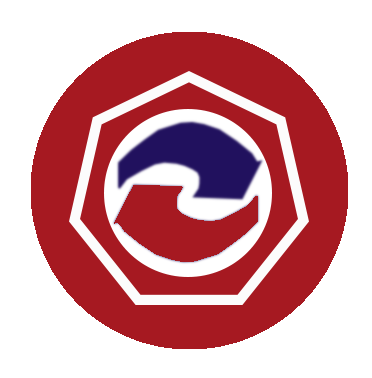
7th Logistical Command 1959–1969*

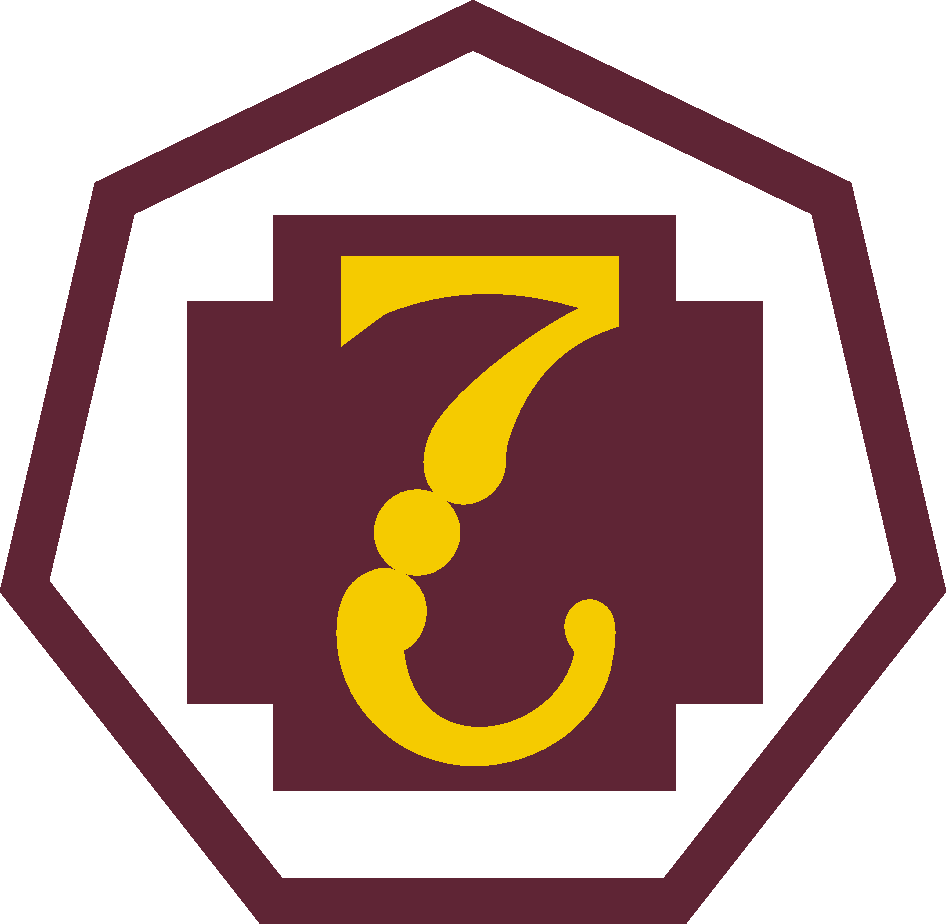
7th Medical Command 1978–1994

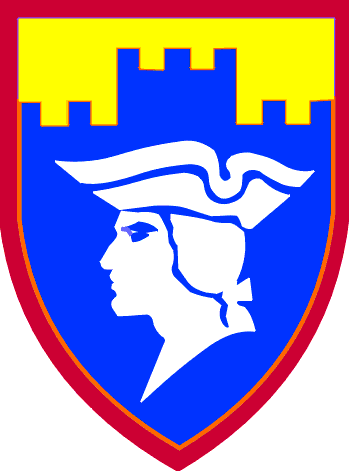
7th Army Reserve Command 1986–2009

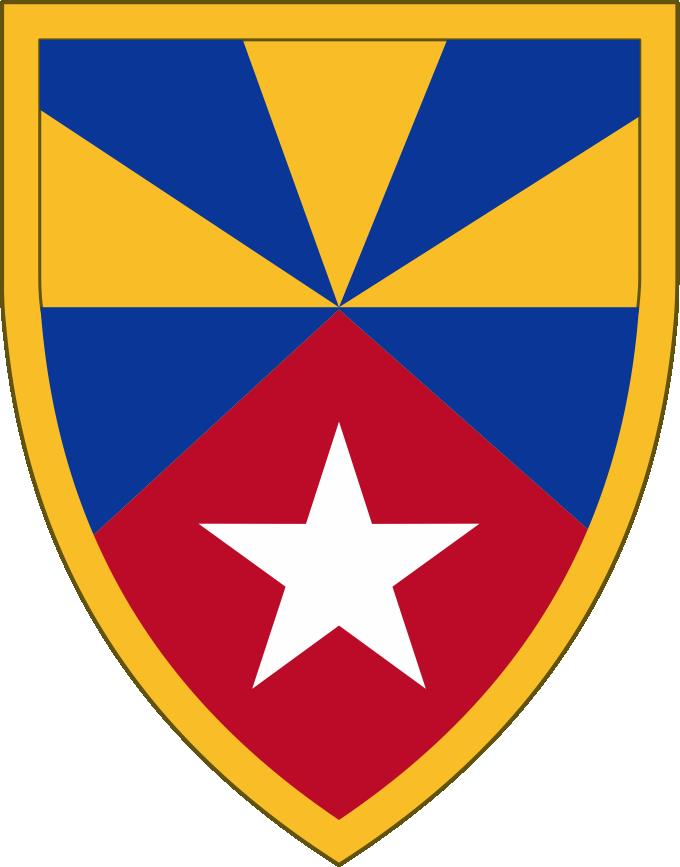
7th Support Command 1978–1990

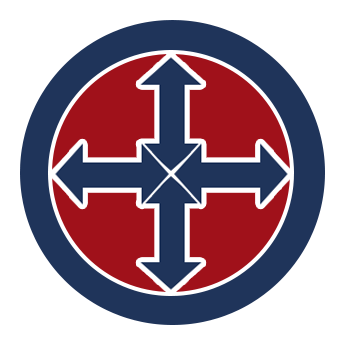
8th Logistical Command 1960–1962

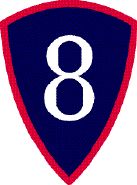
8th Personnel Command 1987–2005

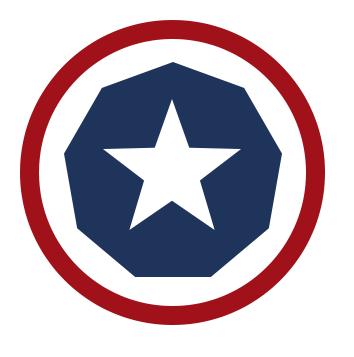
9th Logistical Command 1960–1970

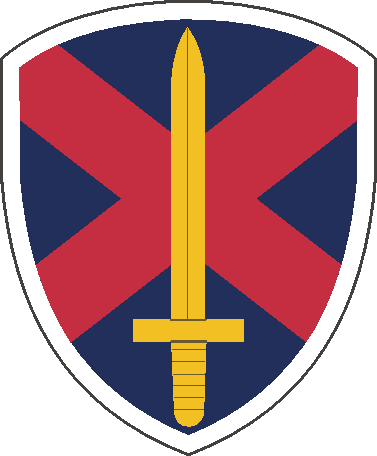
10th Personnel Command 1990–1993

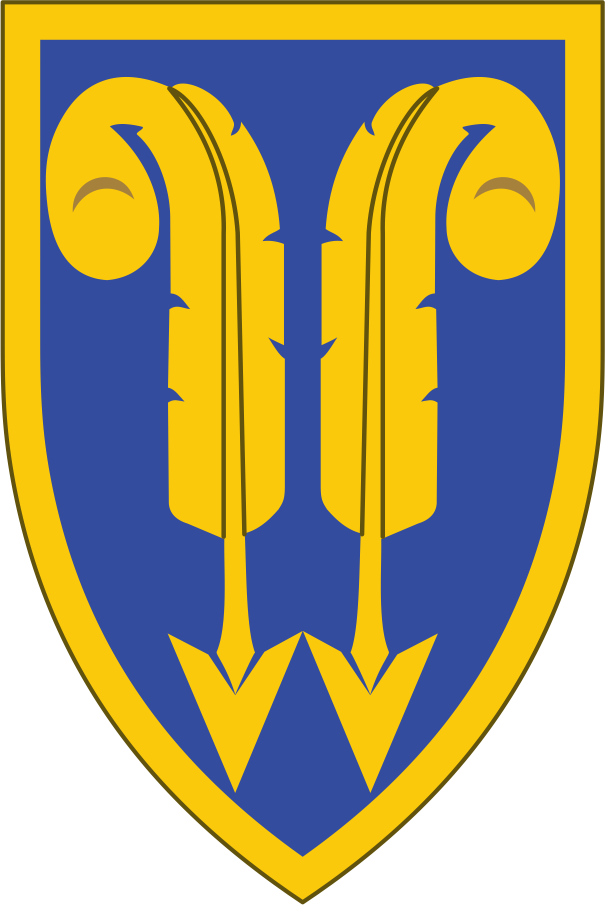
22nd Support Command 1990

66th Theater Aviation Command 2008–2017

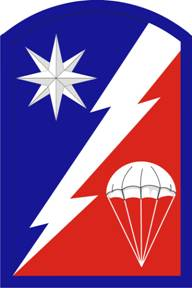
82nd Support Command 1964–2005

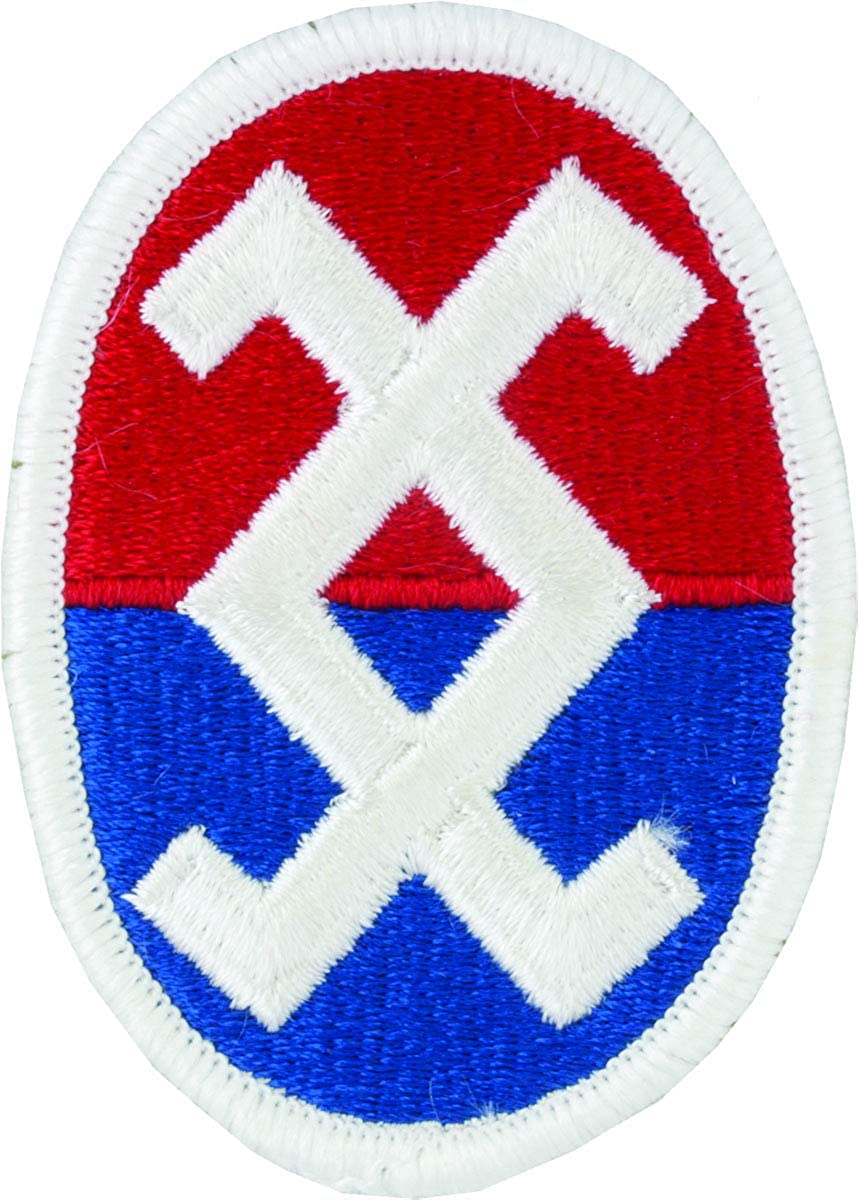
120th Army Reserve Command 1963–1996

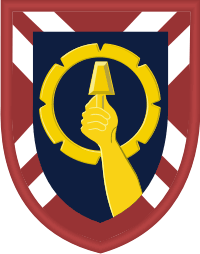
121st Army Reserve Command 1968–1992

122nd Army Reserve Command 1968–1996

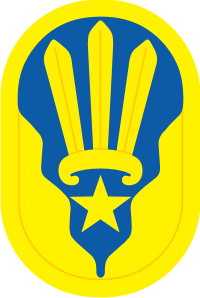
123rd Army Reserve Command 1968–1996

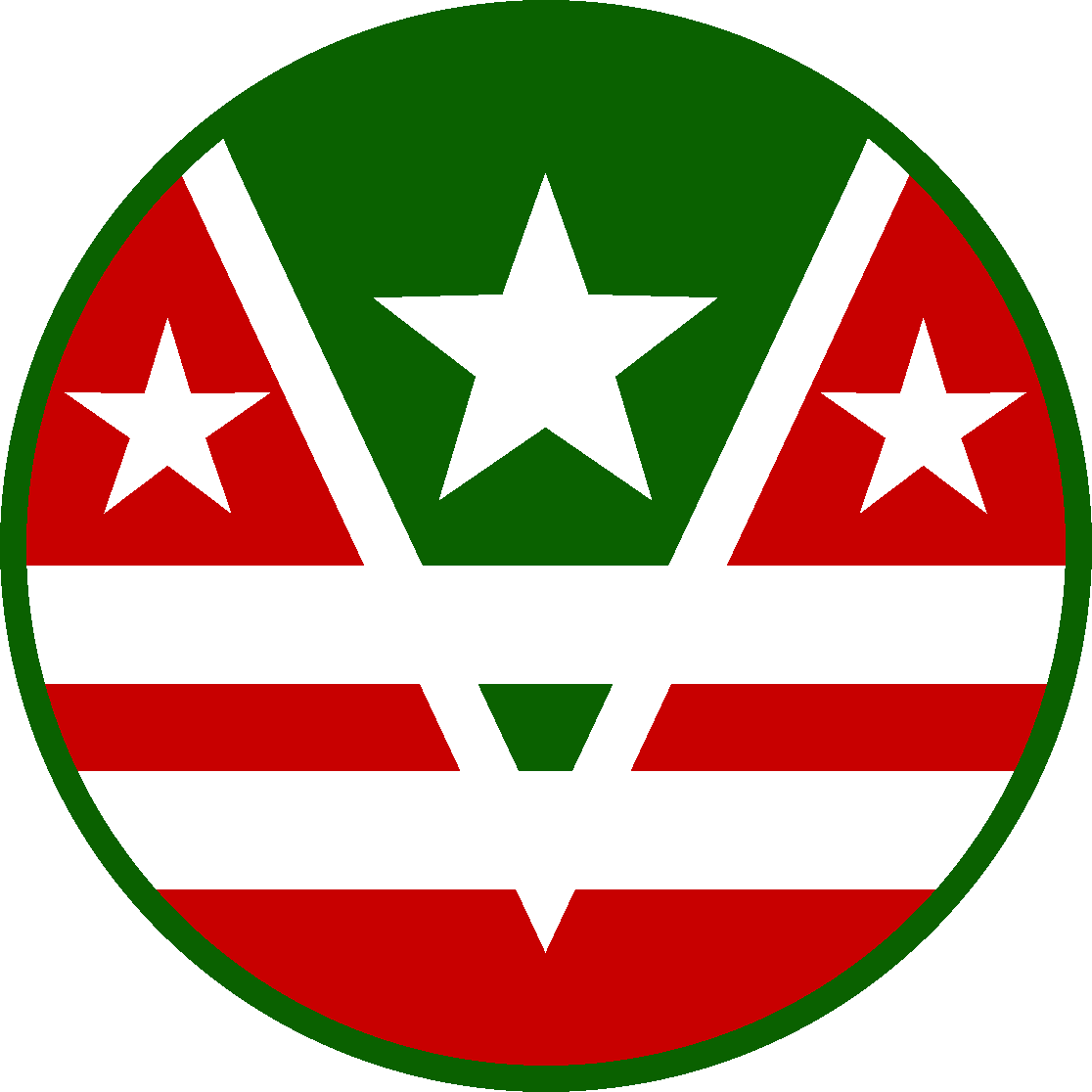
124th Army Reserve Command 1996–2000

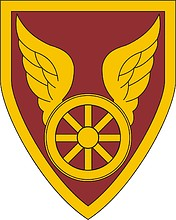
124th Transportation Command 1966–1972

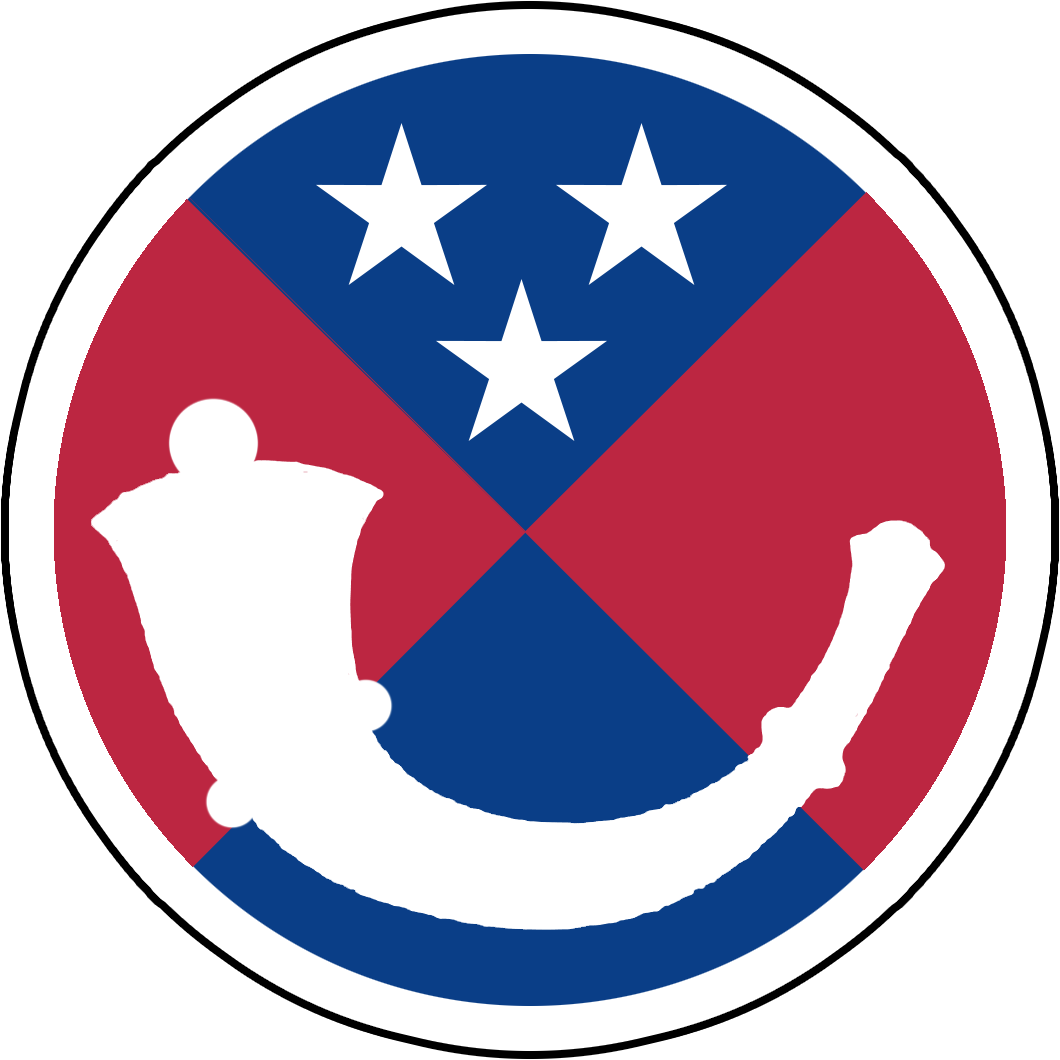
125th Army Reserve Command

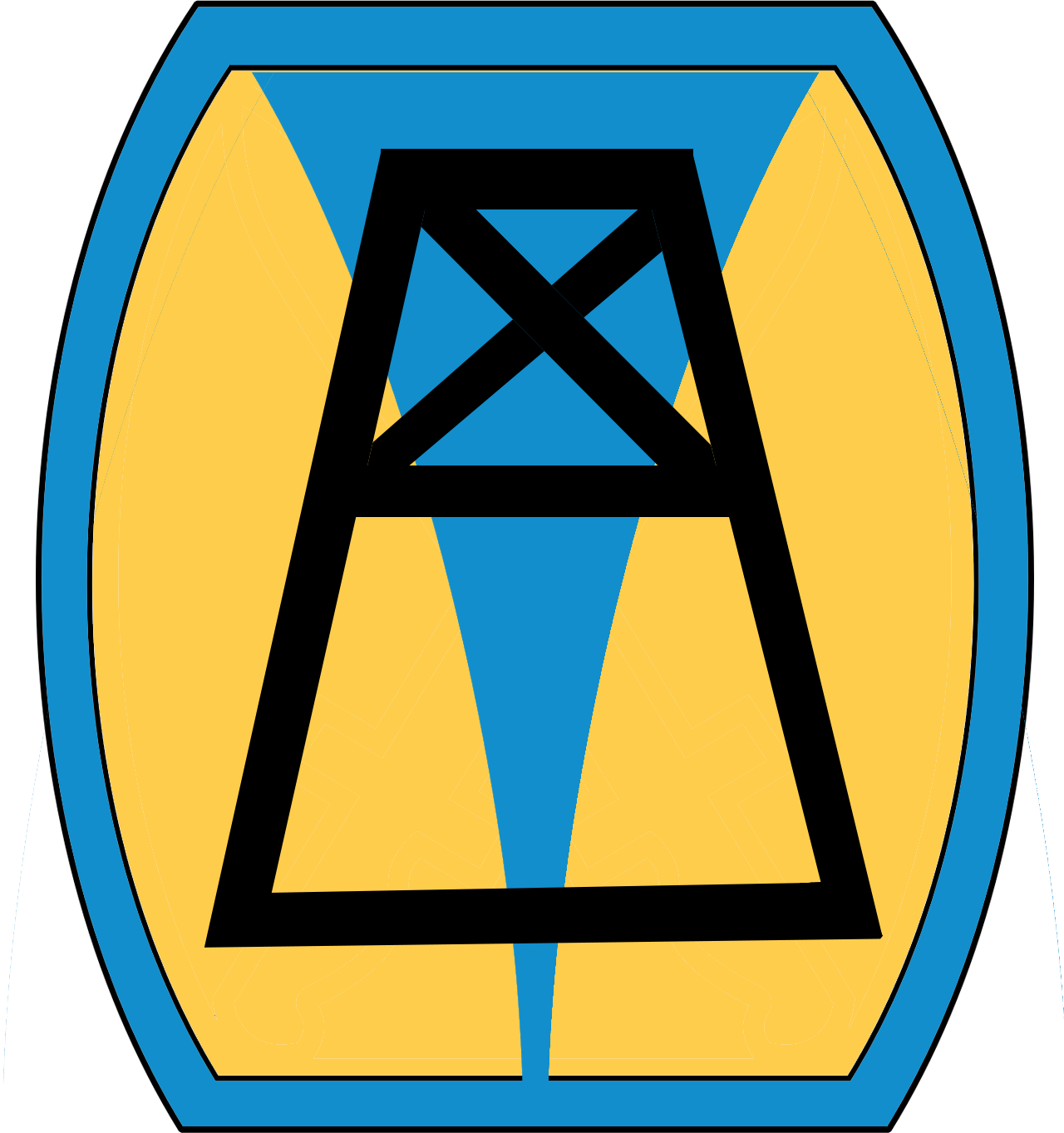
156th Quartermaster Command 1963–1972

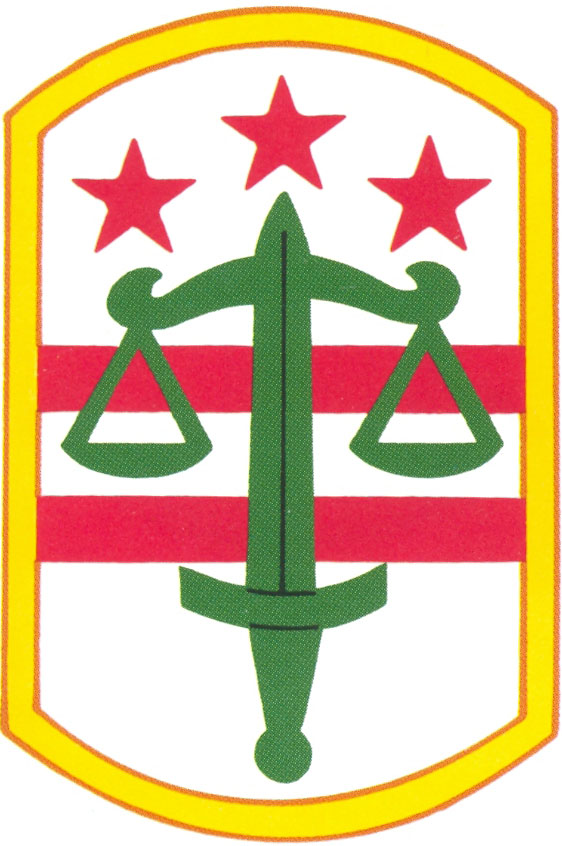
260th Military Police Command 1888–2011

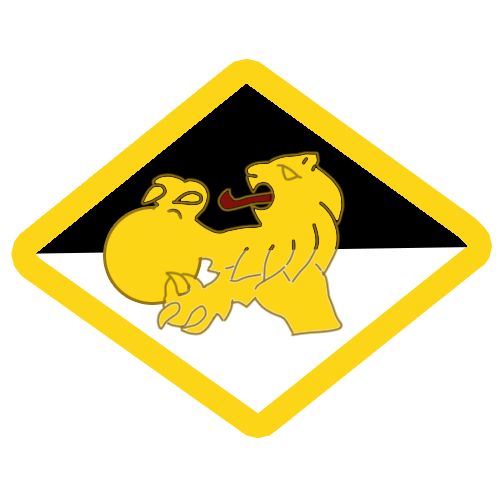
266th Finance Support Command

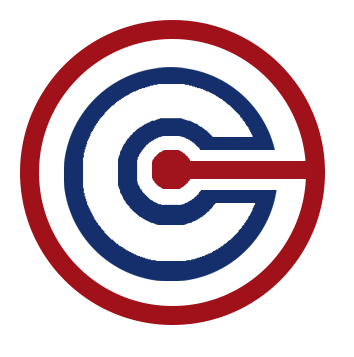
300th Army Logistical Command 1954–1960

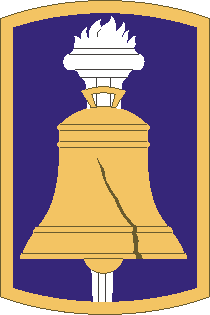
304th Civil Affairs Brigade/Command

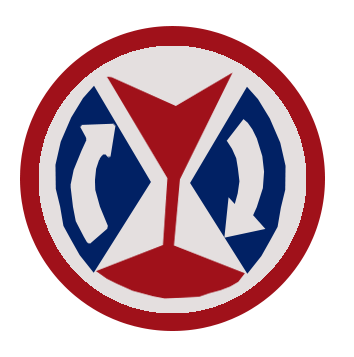
304th Army Logistical Command 1955–1960

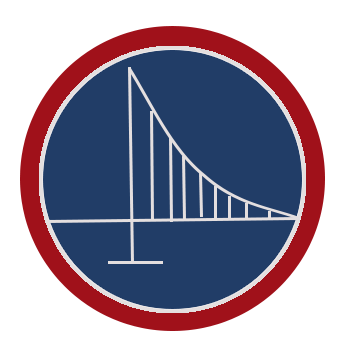
305th Army Logistical Command 1954–1956

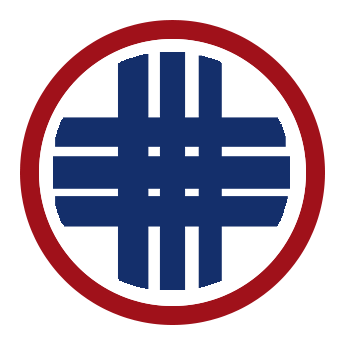
306th Army Logistical Command 1951–1956

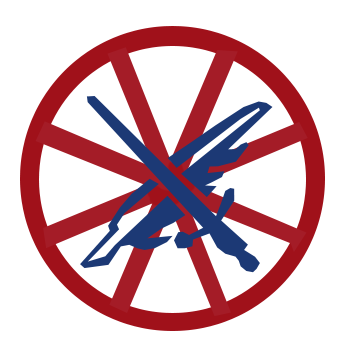
307th Army Logistical Command 1953–1956

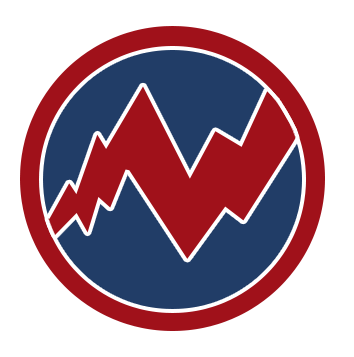
312th Army Logistical Command 1952–1960

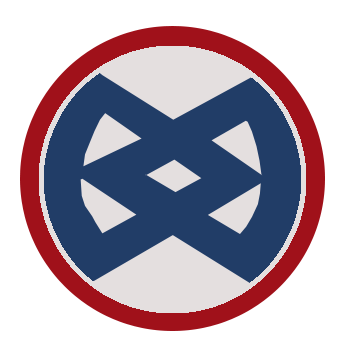
313th Army Logistical Command 1953–1960

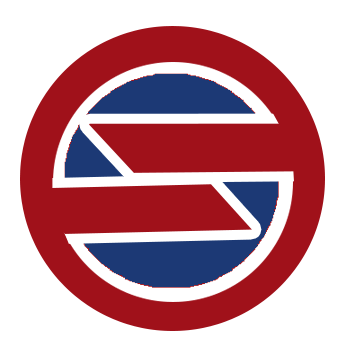
314th Logistical Command 1956–1957

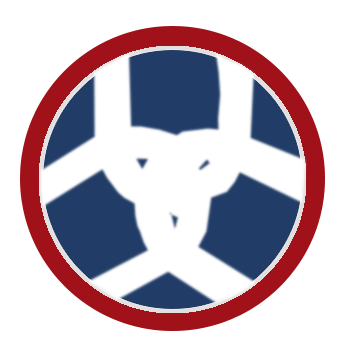
315th Army Logistical Command 1954–1960

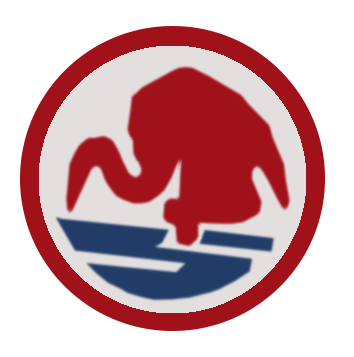
318th Army Logistical Command 1956–1957

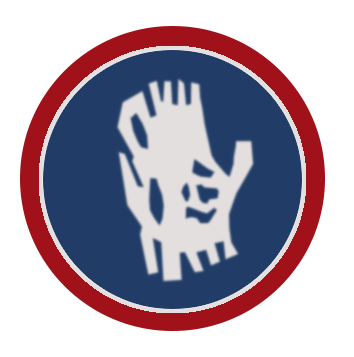
319th Army Logistical Command 1955

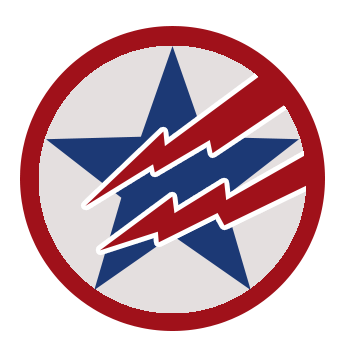
320th Army Logistical Command 1955–1956

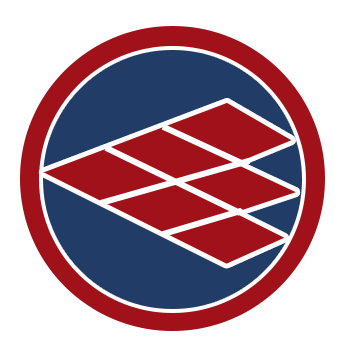
321st Army Logistical Command 1951–1955

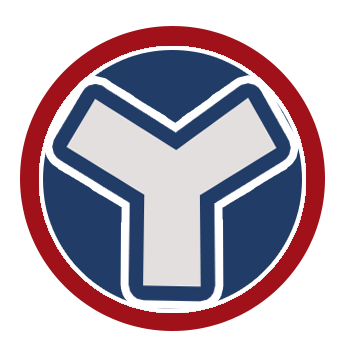
322nd Army Logistical Command 1952–1960

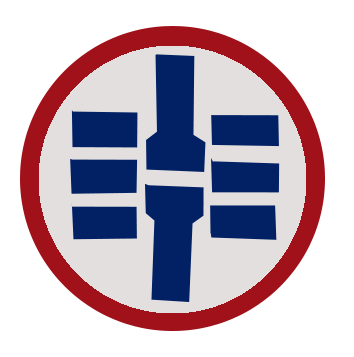
323rd Army Logistical Command 1960

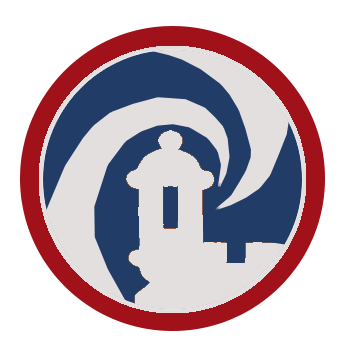
324th Army Logistical Command 1950–1965

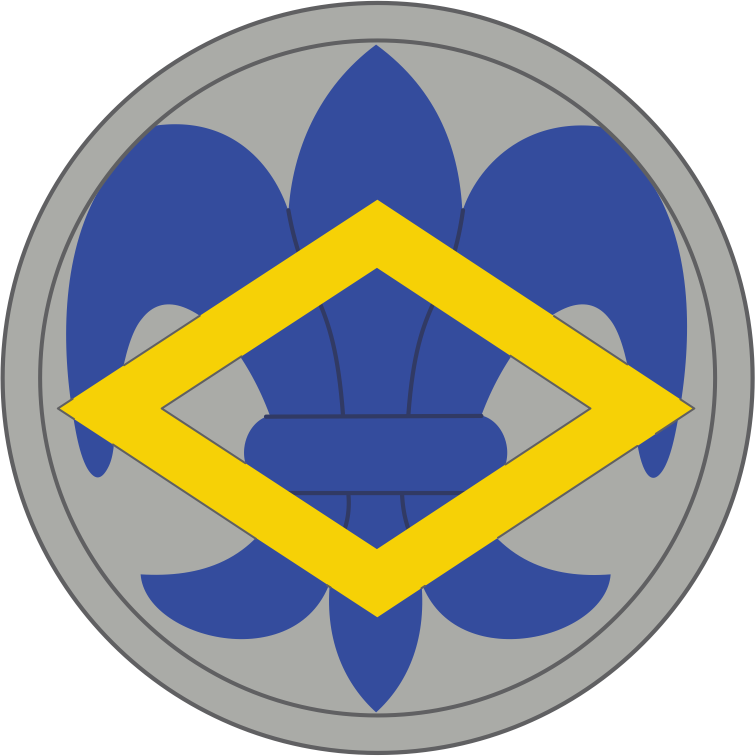
336th Finance Command

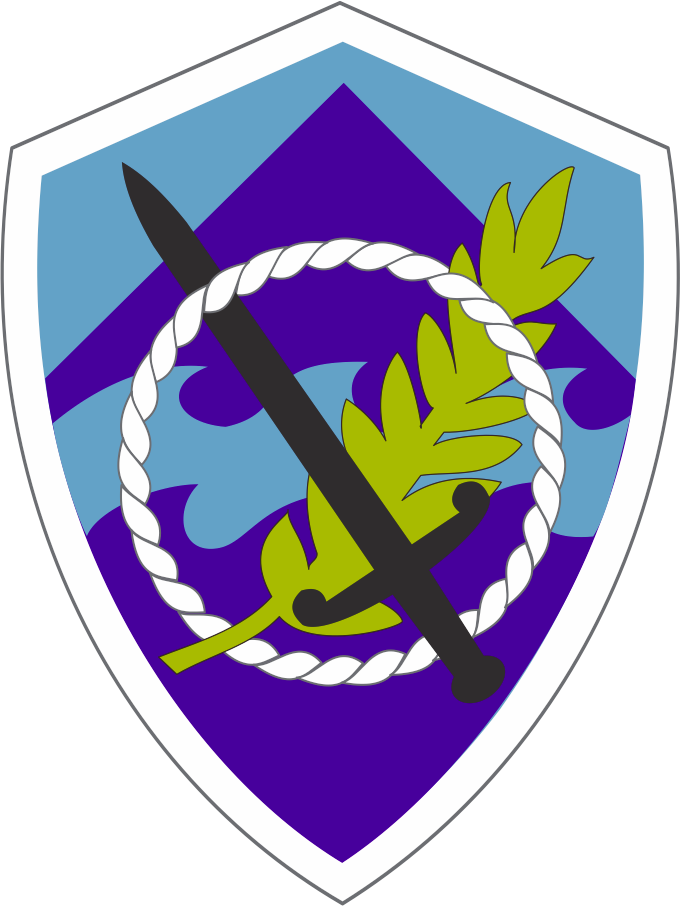
350th Civil Affairs Command

352nd Civil Affairs Command

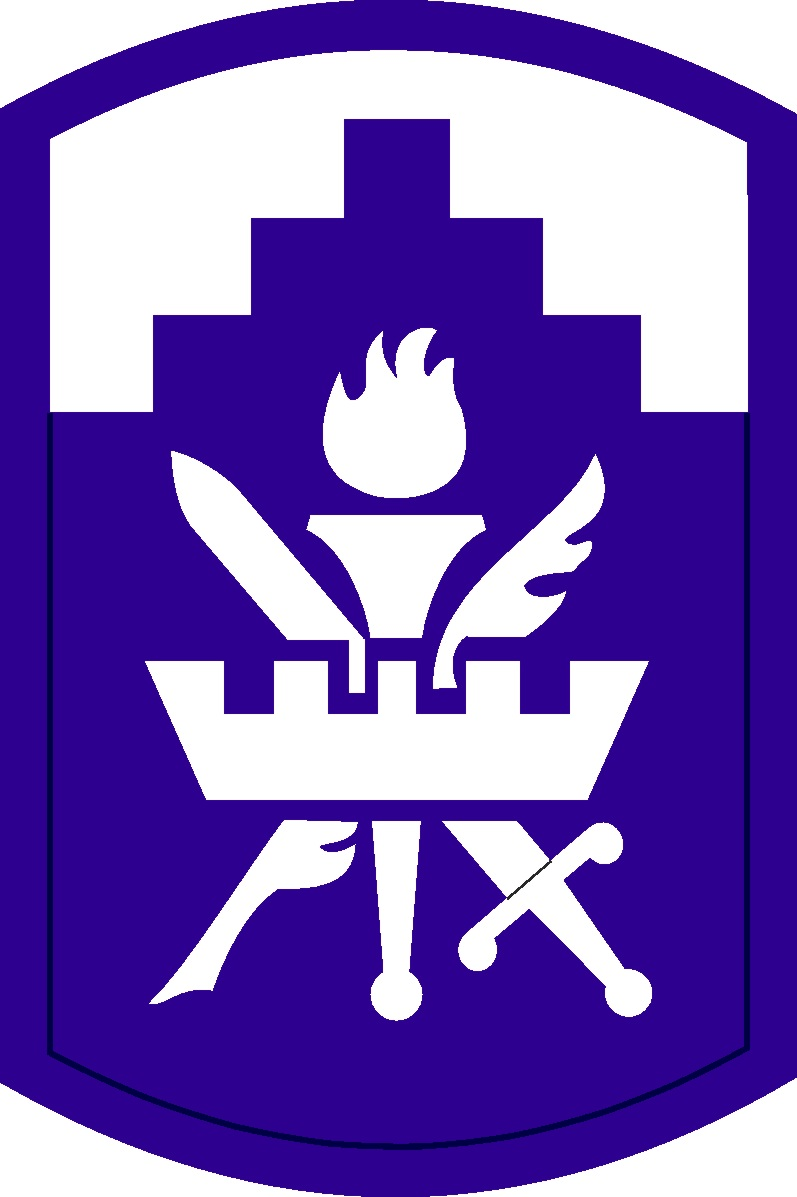
353rd Civil Affairs Command

== Non-numbered commands ==
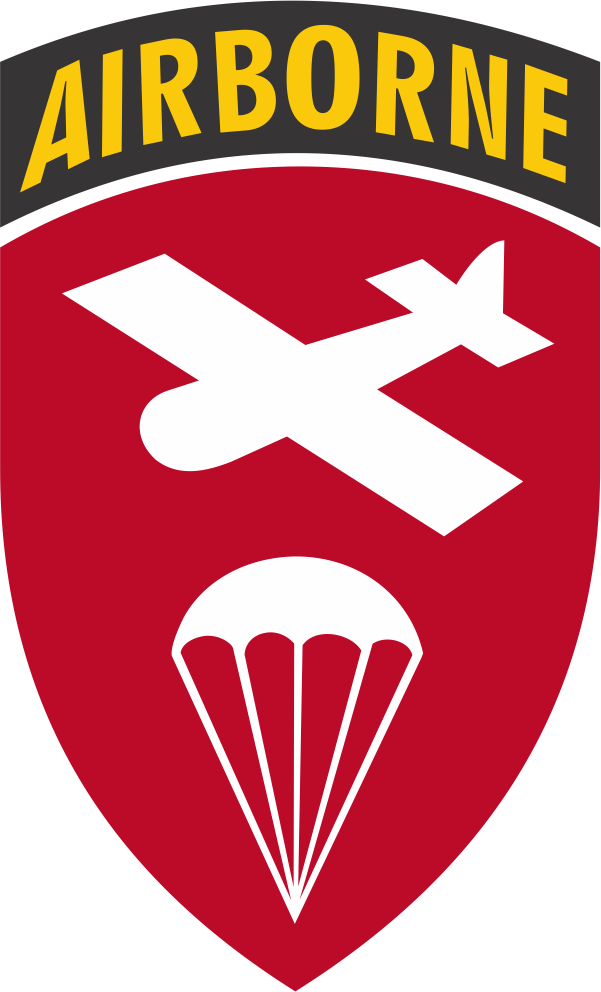
Airborne Command 1942–1944

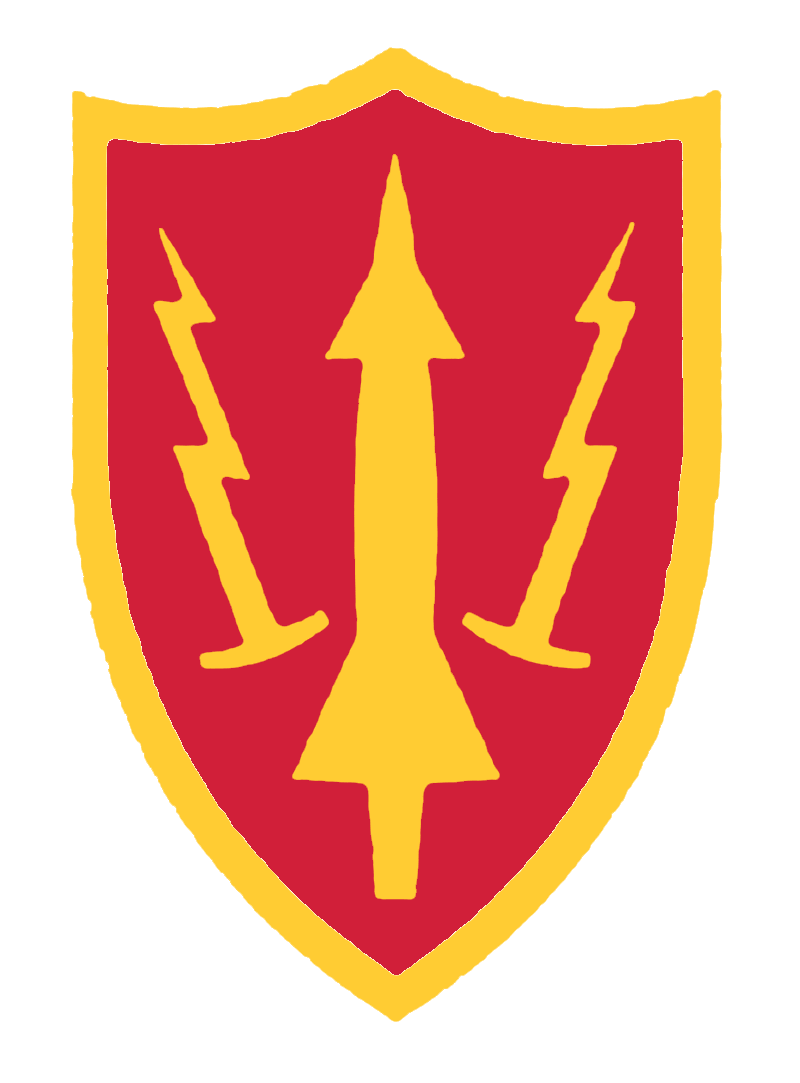
Army Air Defense Command 1957–1974

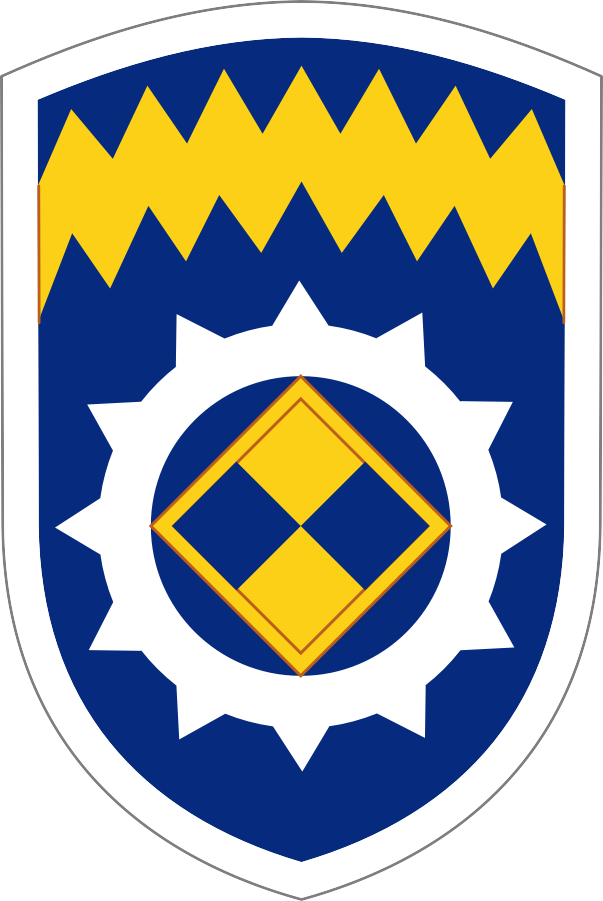
Alaska Support Command (USARAL) 1960–1972

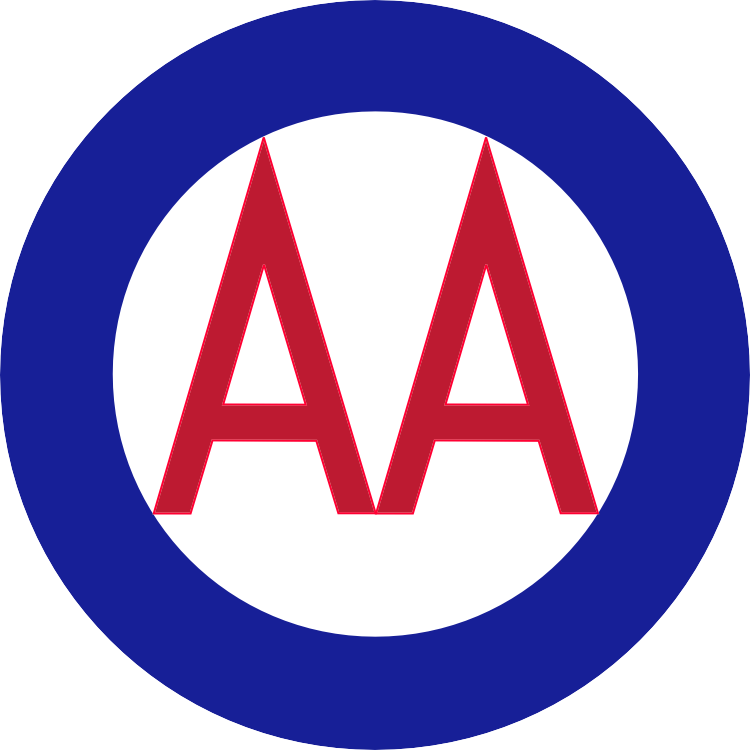
Army Antiaircraft Command 1942–1950

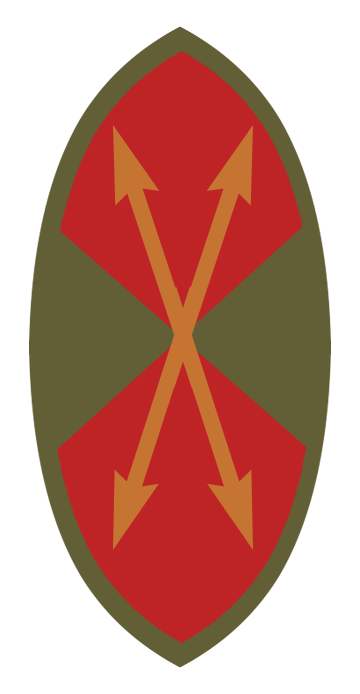
Antiaircraft Command Central

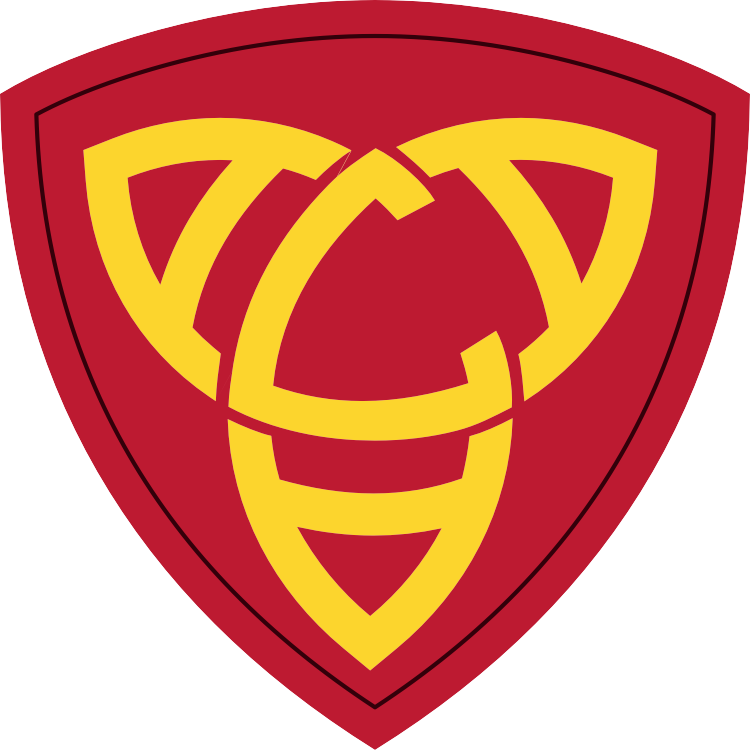
Antiaircraft Command Eastern

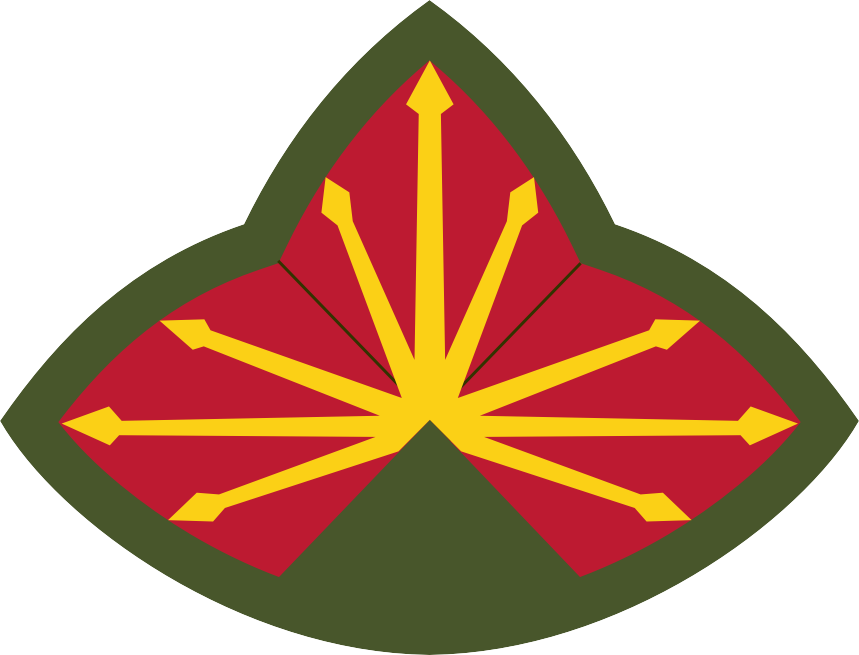
Antiaircraft Command Southern

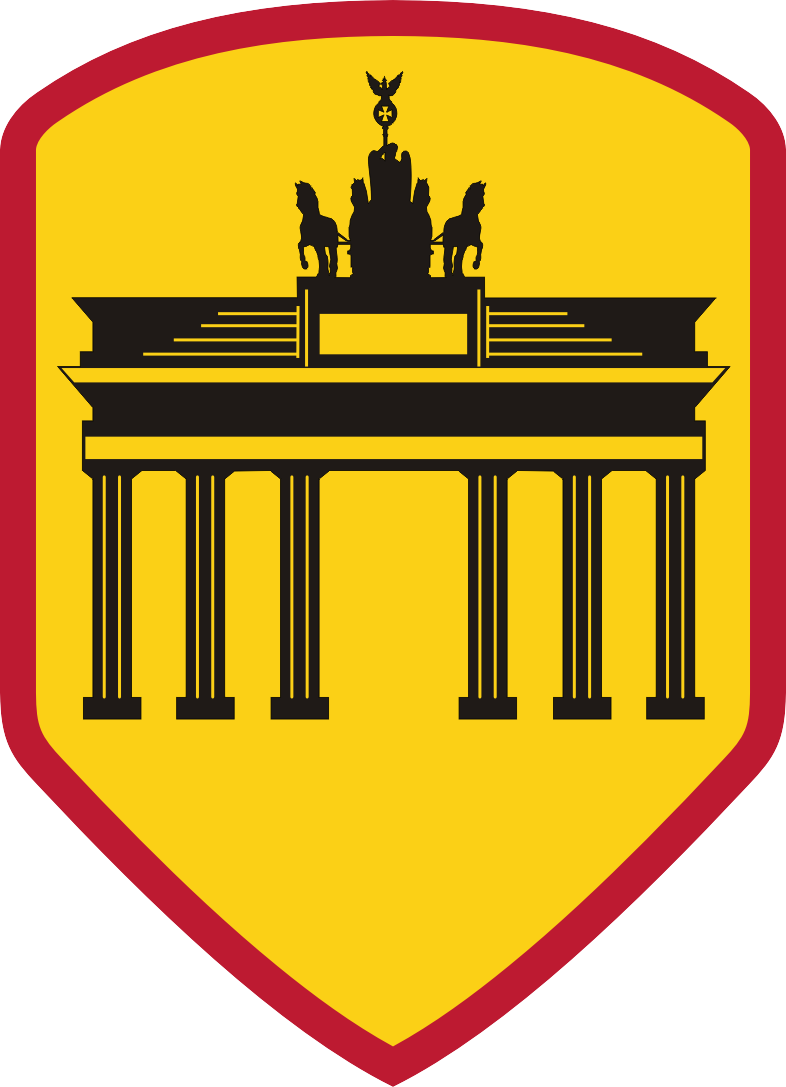
Berlin Command

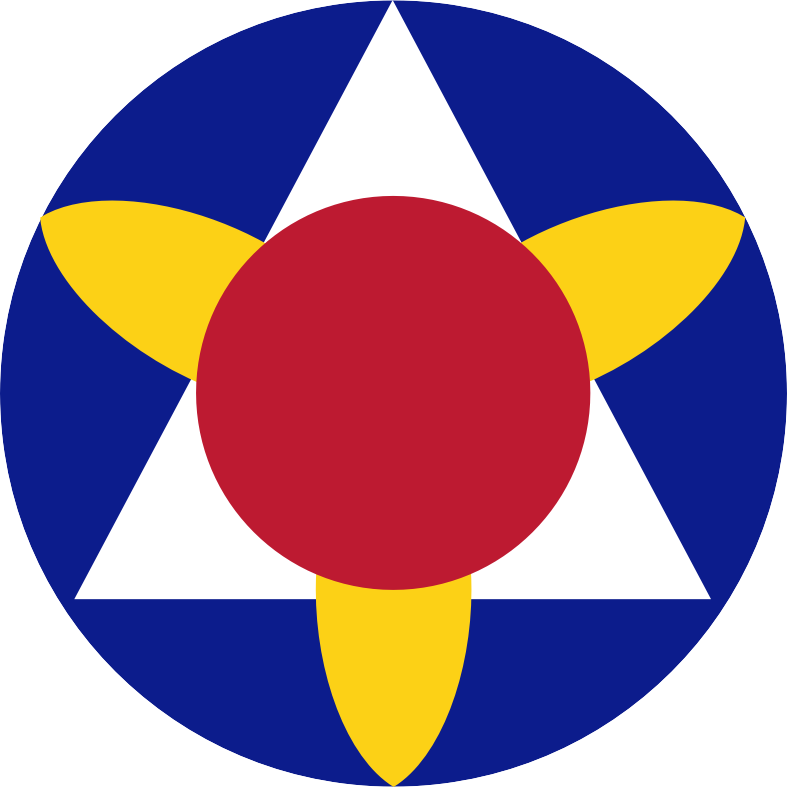
Bermuda Base Command 1941–1948

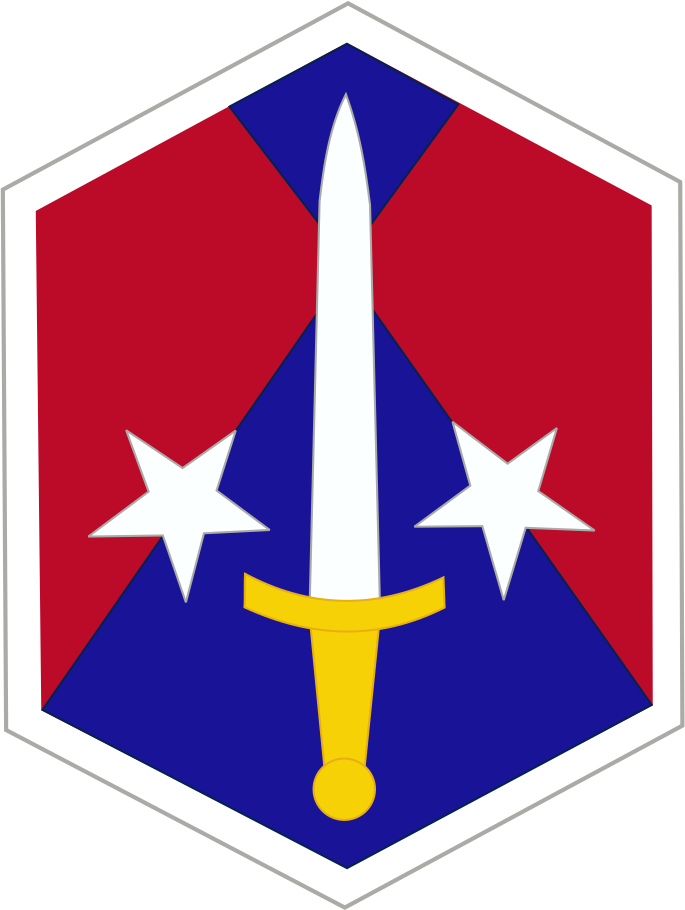
Capital Military Assistance Command - Vietnam

Combat Developments Command

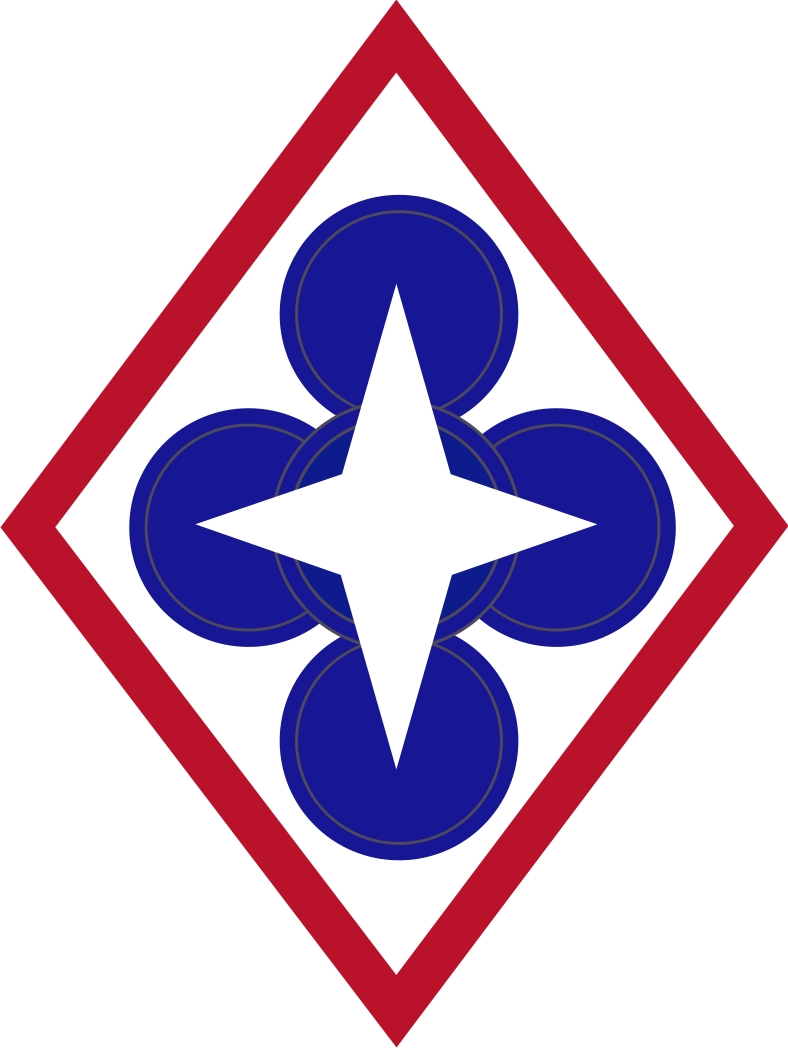
Combined Arms Support Command 1990–2009

Computer Systems Command

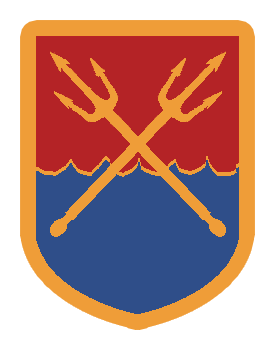
Eastern Defense Command 1941–1946

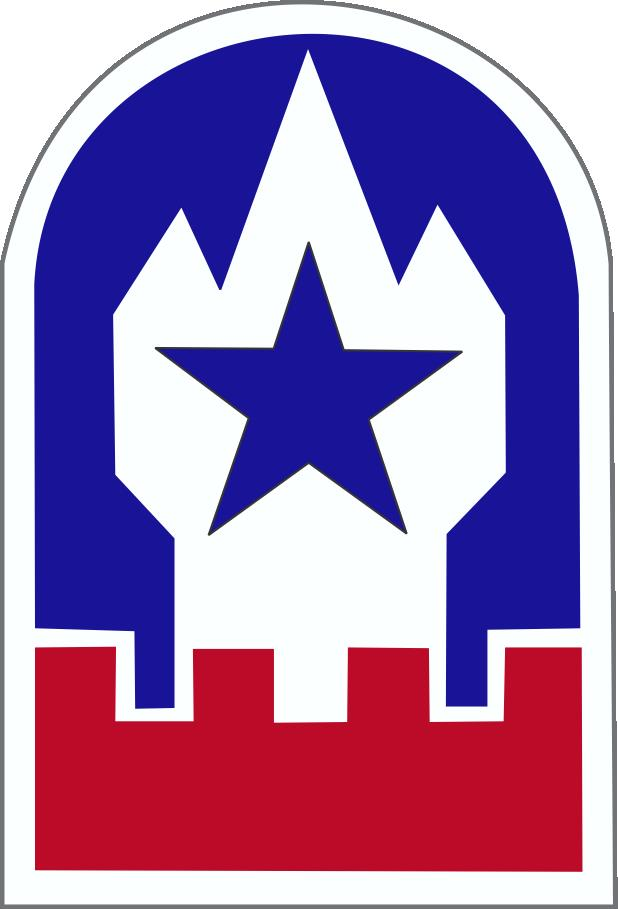
US Army Engineer Command, Europe 1966–1974

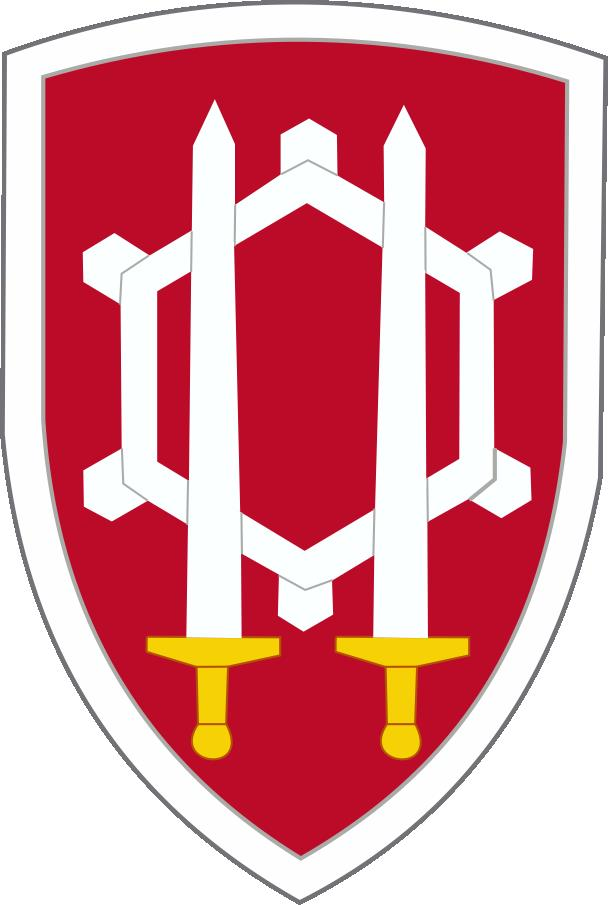
US Army Engineer Command, Vietnam 1966–1971

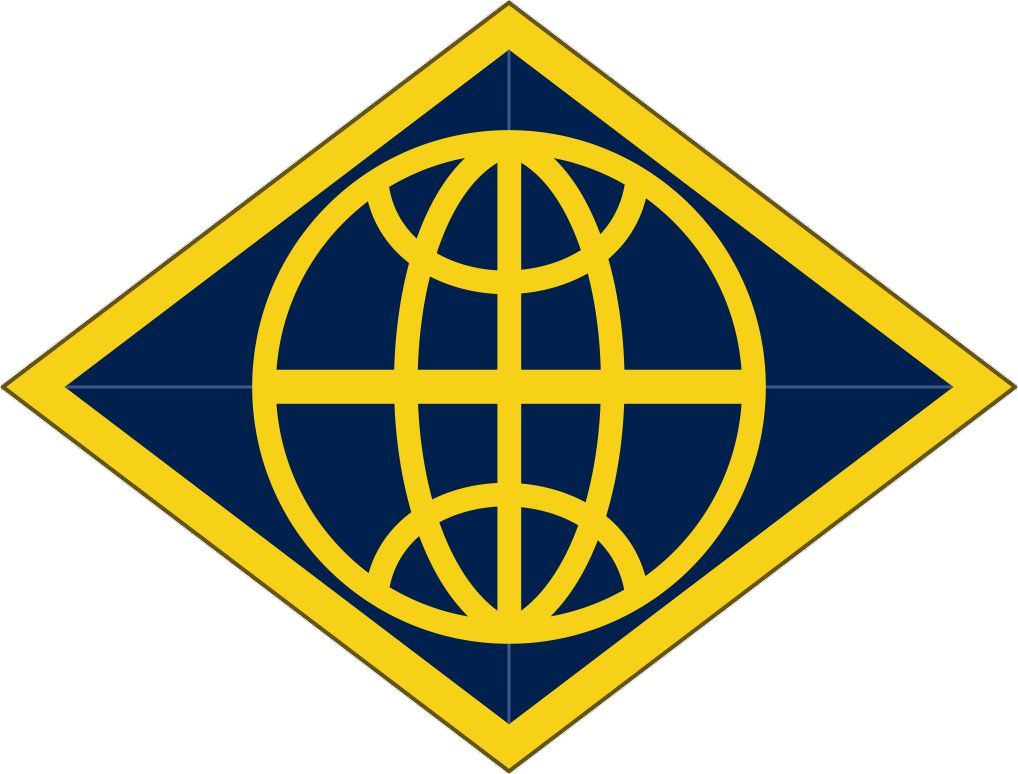
Financial Management Command 2017–2019

Forces Command 1973–2025

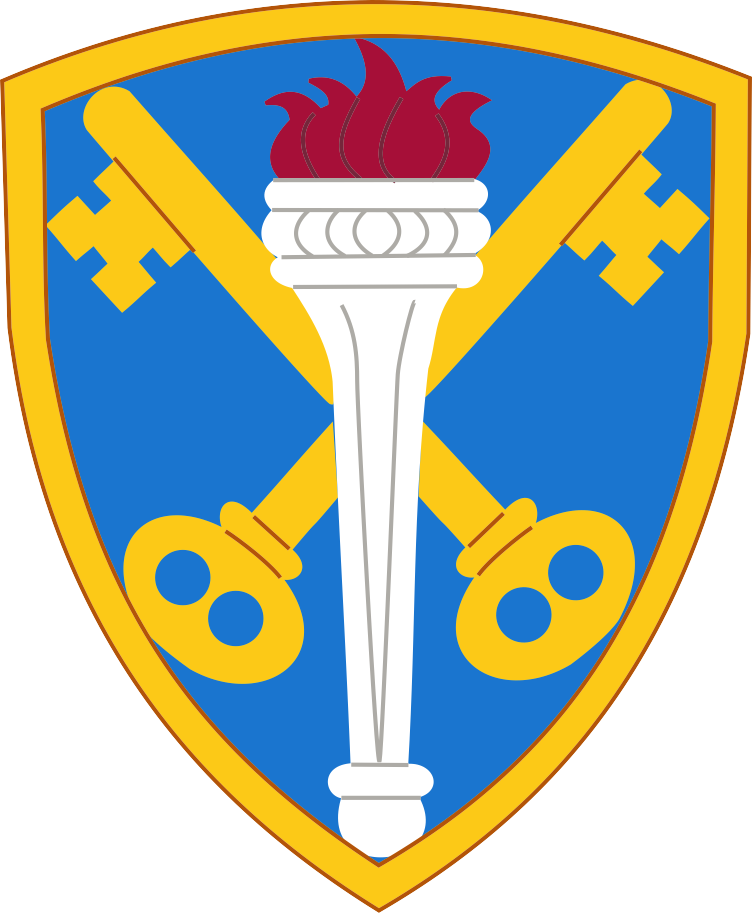
Foreign Intelligence Command

Futures Command 2018–2025

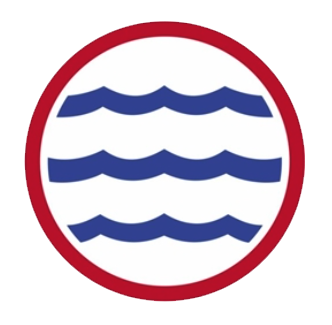
Greenland Base Command

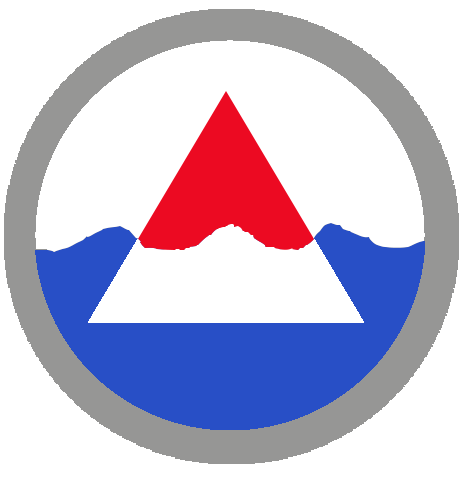
Iceland Base Command 1941–1947

Information Systems Engineering Command 1989–2010

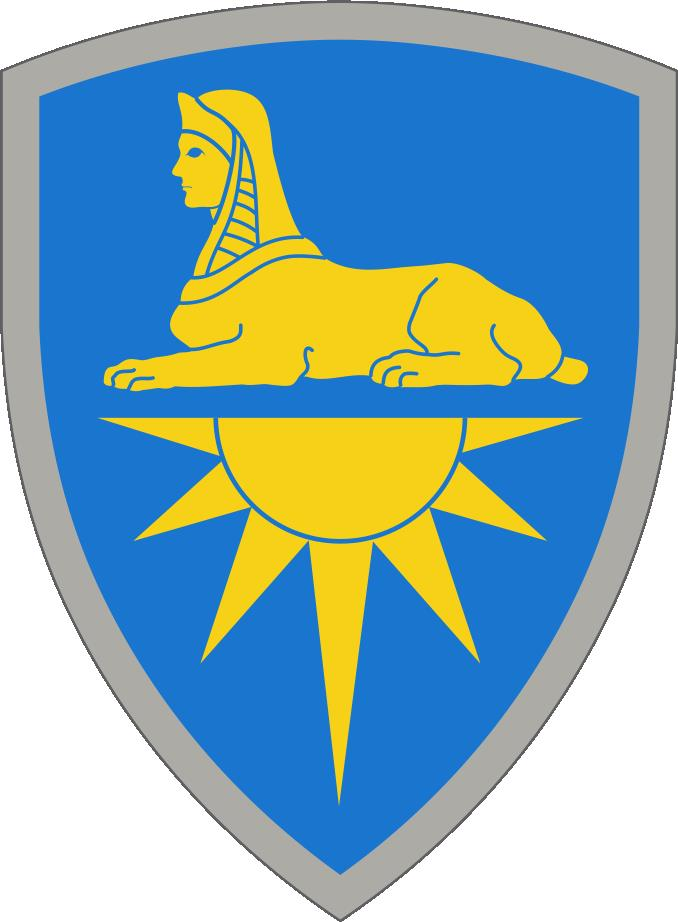
Intelligence Command (USAINTC) 1965–1974

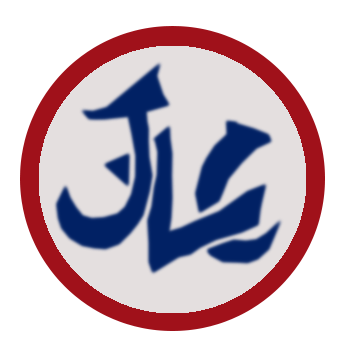
Japan Logistical Command 1950–1973

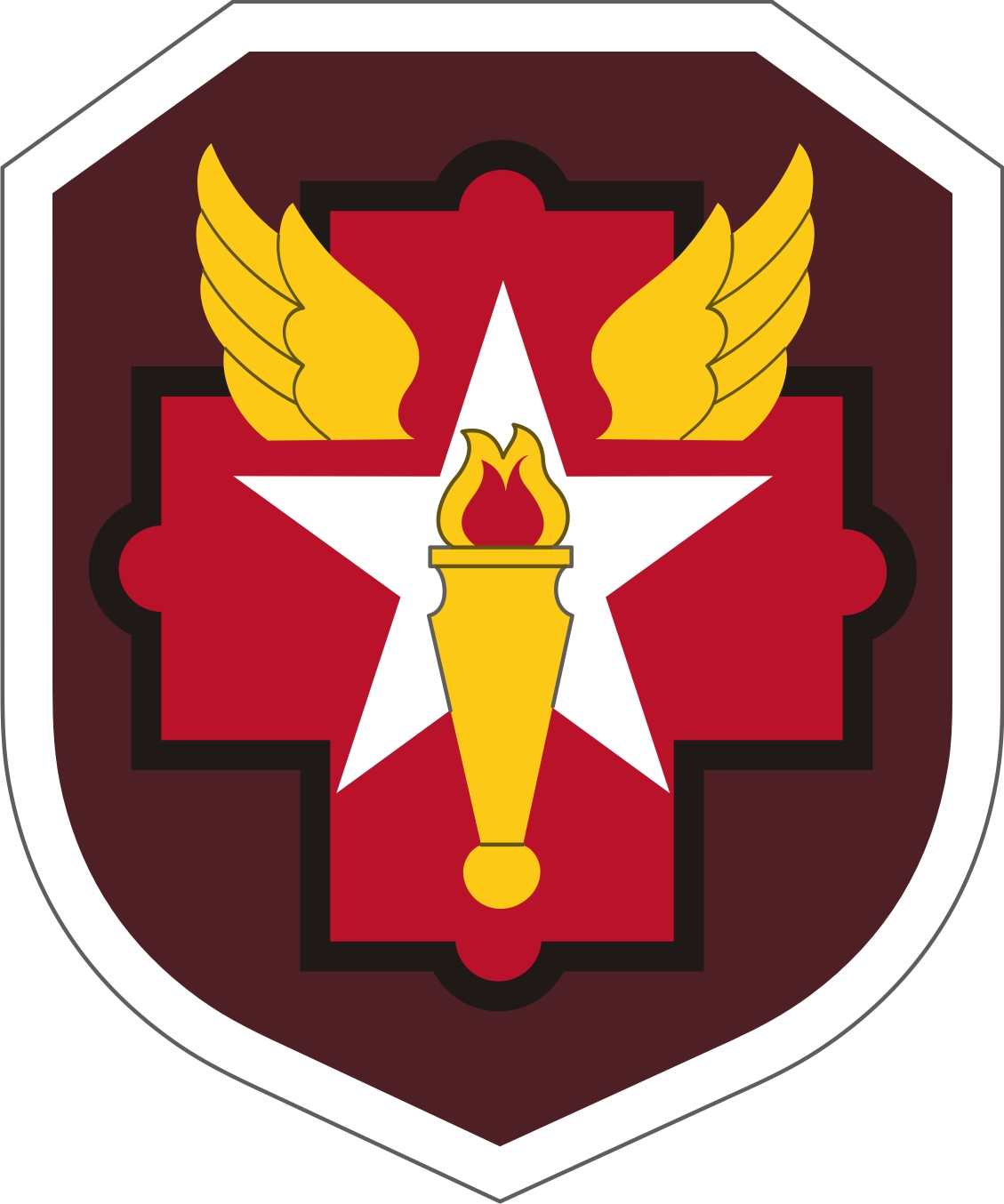
Joint Military Medical Command 1987–1991

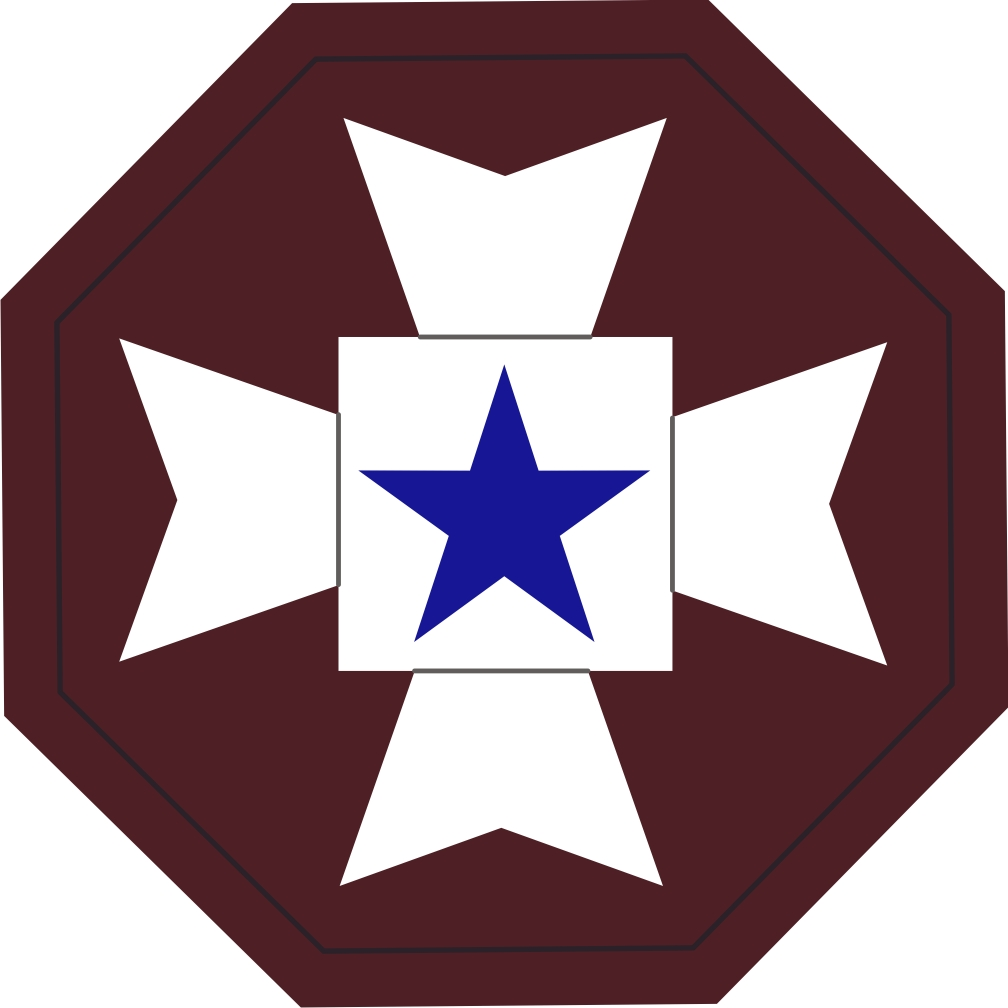
United States Army Medical Command, Europe (USAMEDCOMEUR) 1968–1978

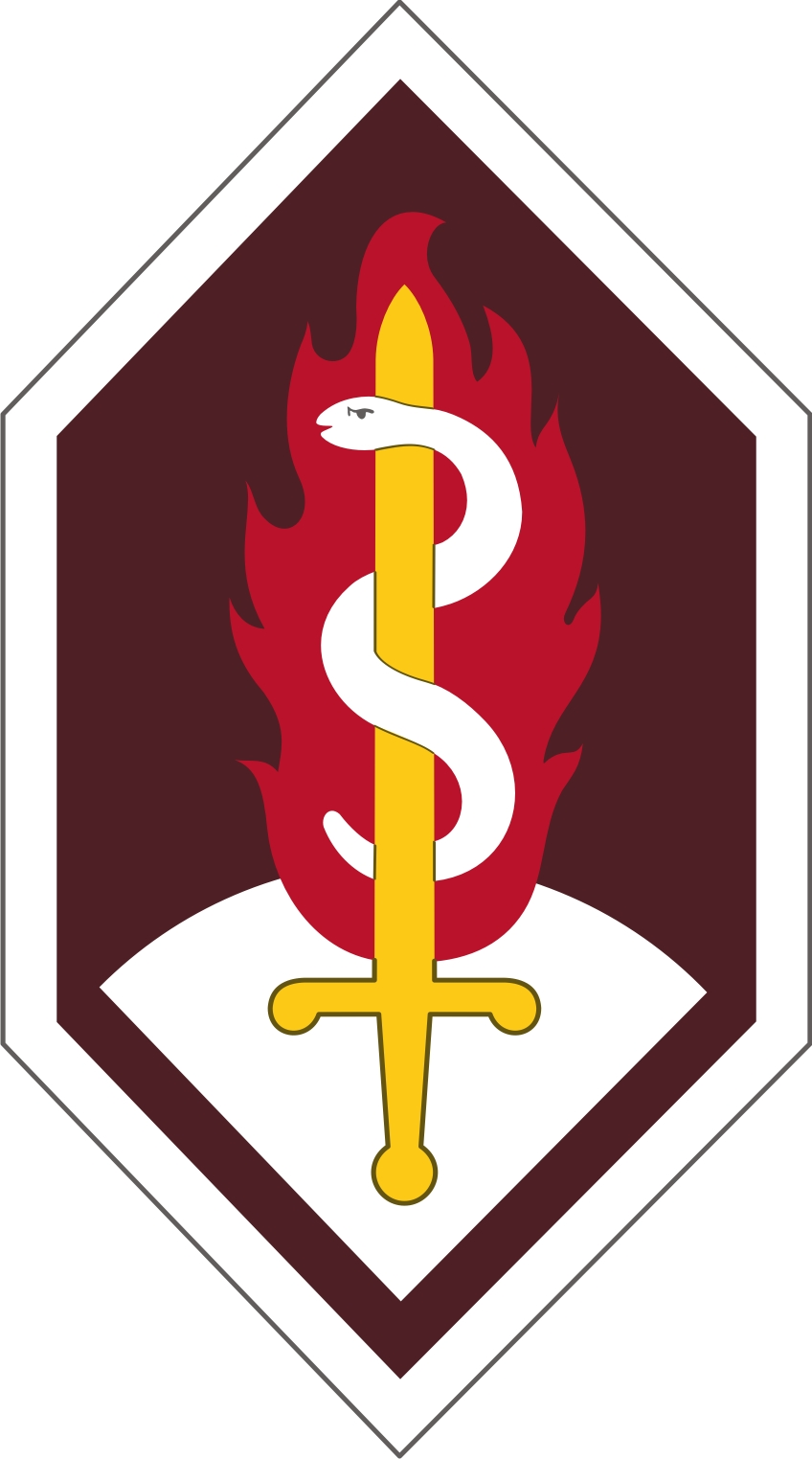
Medical Research and Development Command

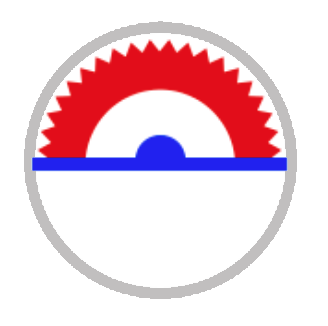
Newfoundland Base Command

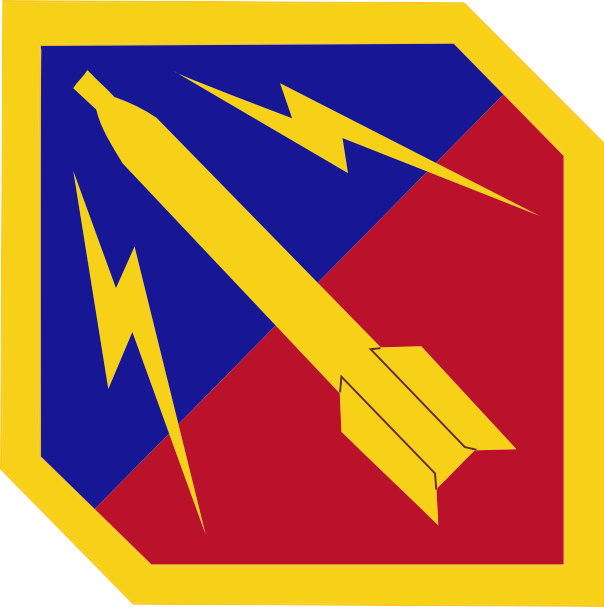
Ordnance Missile Command

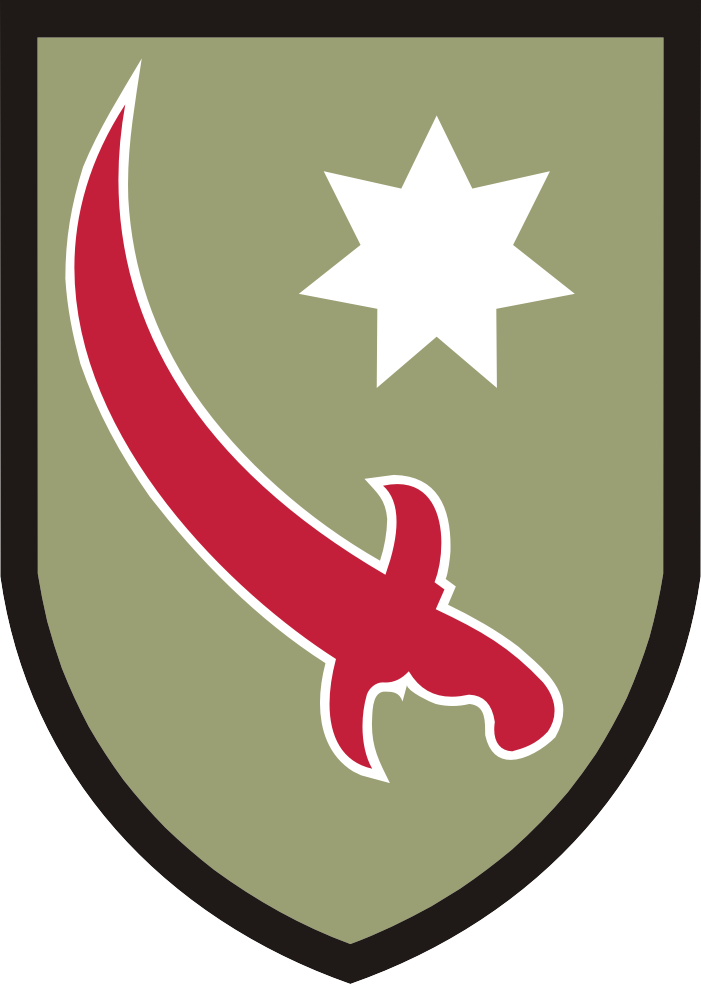
Persian Gulf Command 1942–1945

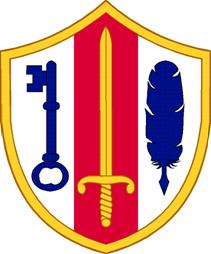
Reserve Joint and Special Troops Command

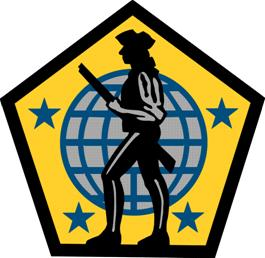
Reserve Personnel Command

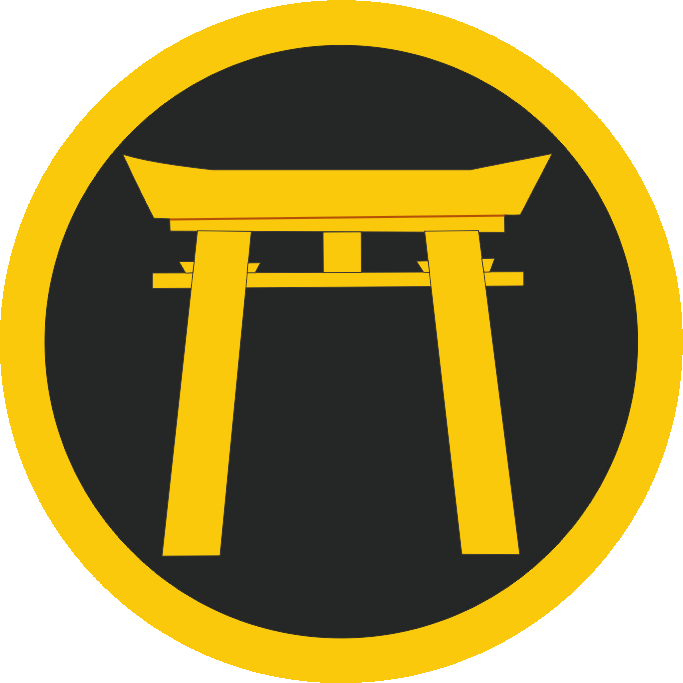
Ryukyu Island Command

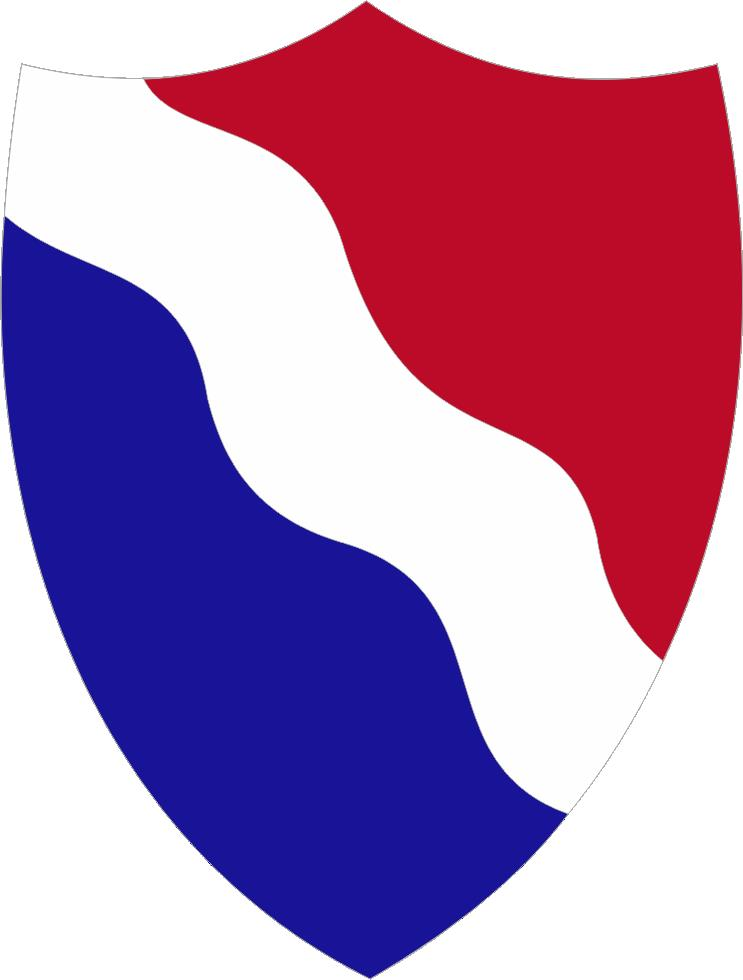
Southern Defense Command 1941–1945

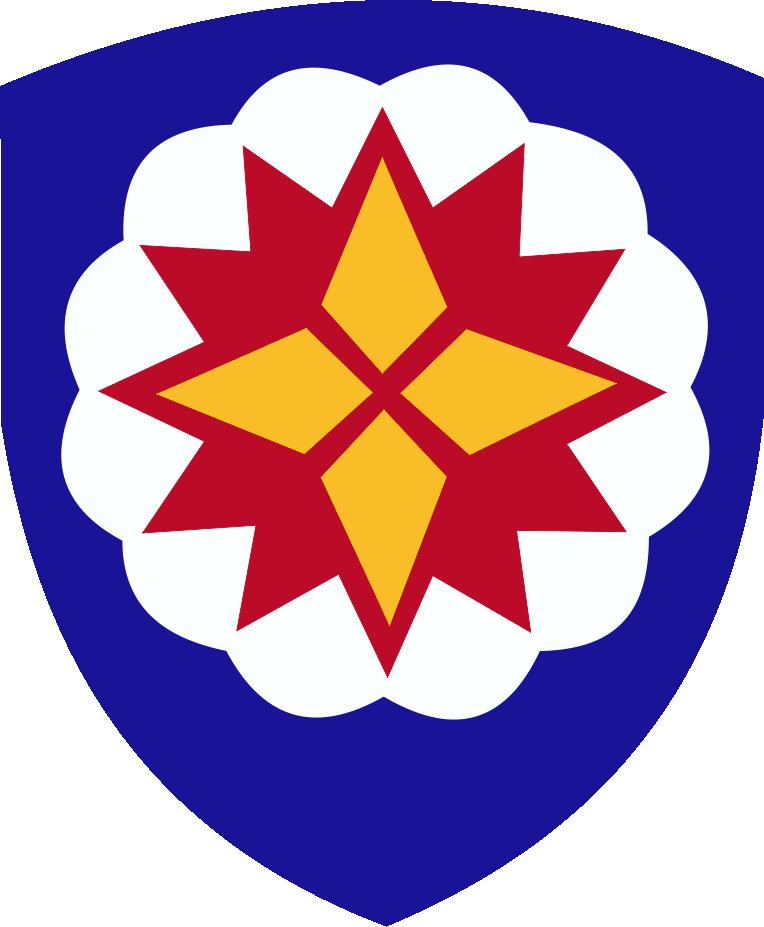
Special Ammunition Support Command (SASCOM) 1962–1972

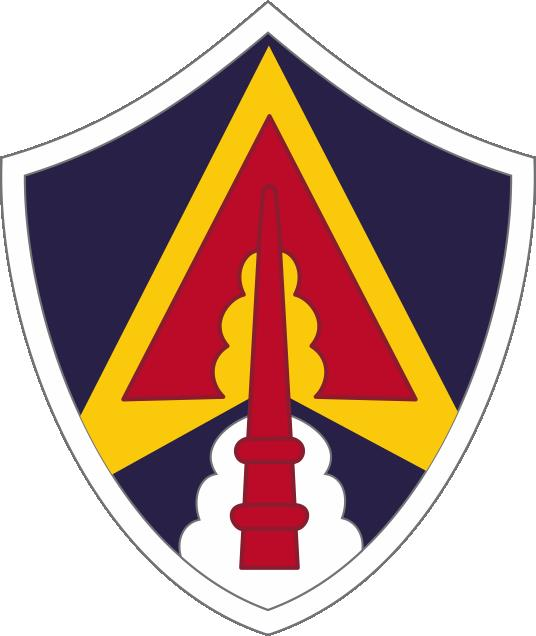
Army Space Command

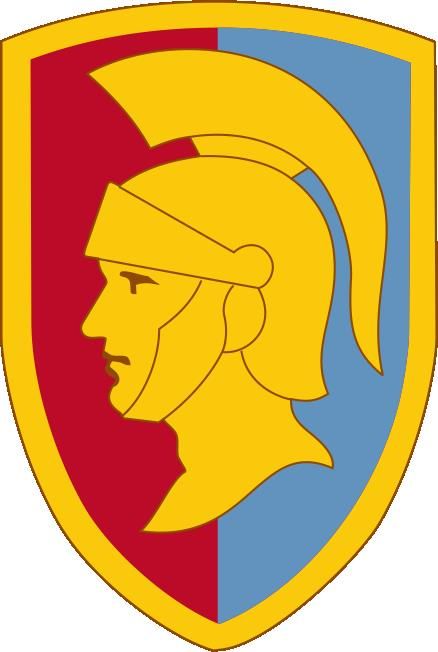
Strategic Defense Command

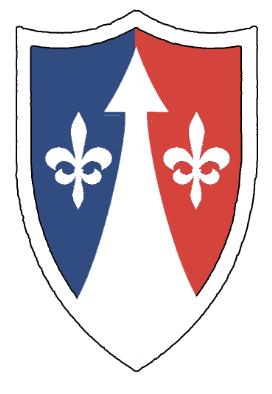
Theater Army Support Command, Europe (TASCOMEUR) 1951–1960

Training and Doctrine Command 1973–2025

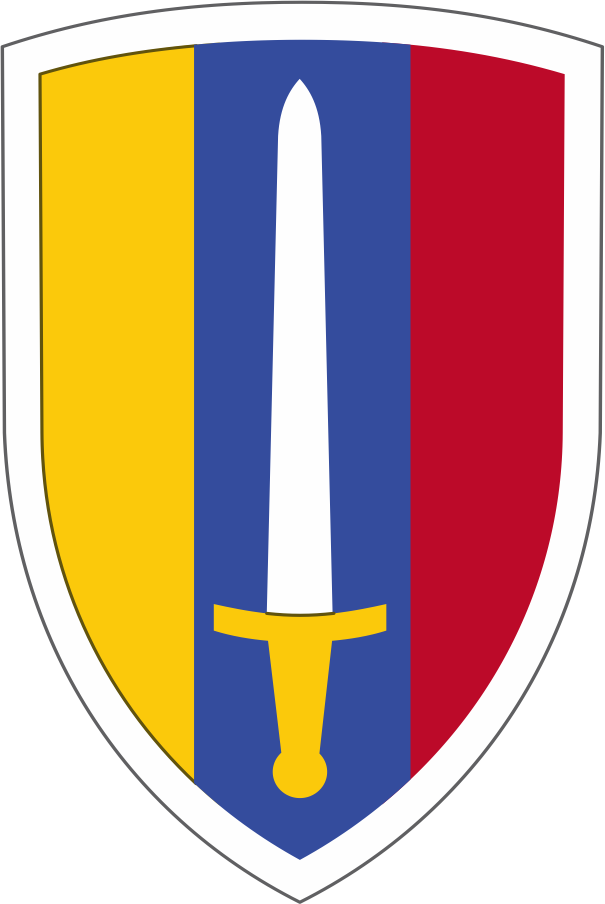
US Army Vietnam 1965–1972

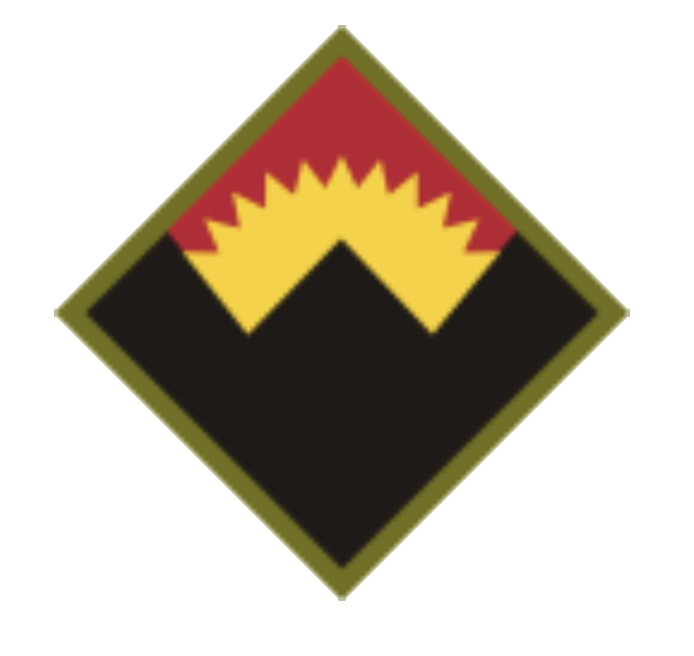
Western Defense Command 1941–1946

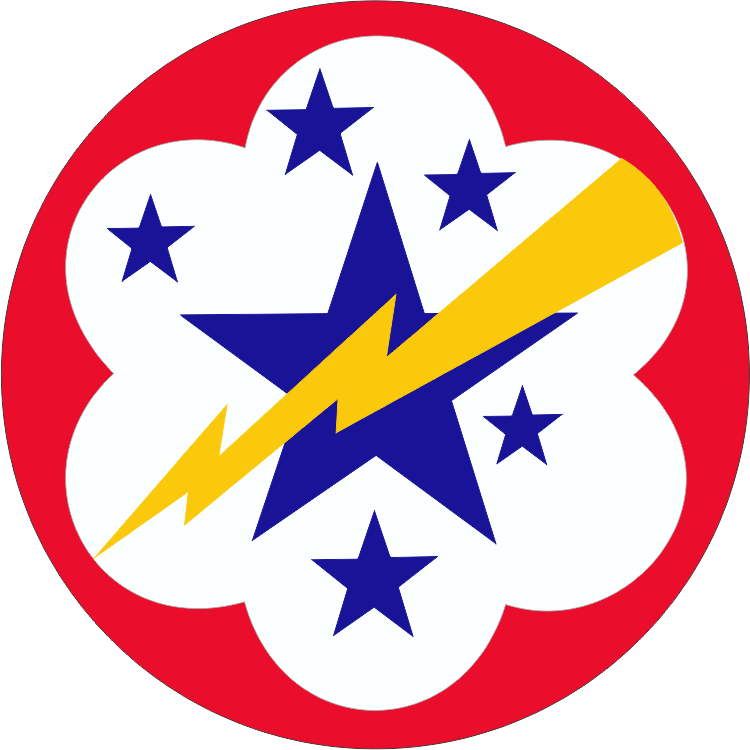
Western Pacific Command

== Corps ==
I Armored Corps

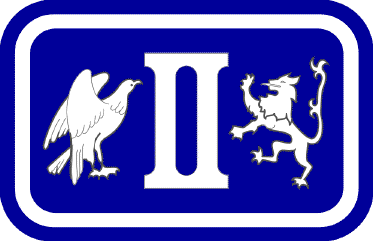
II Corps

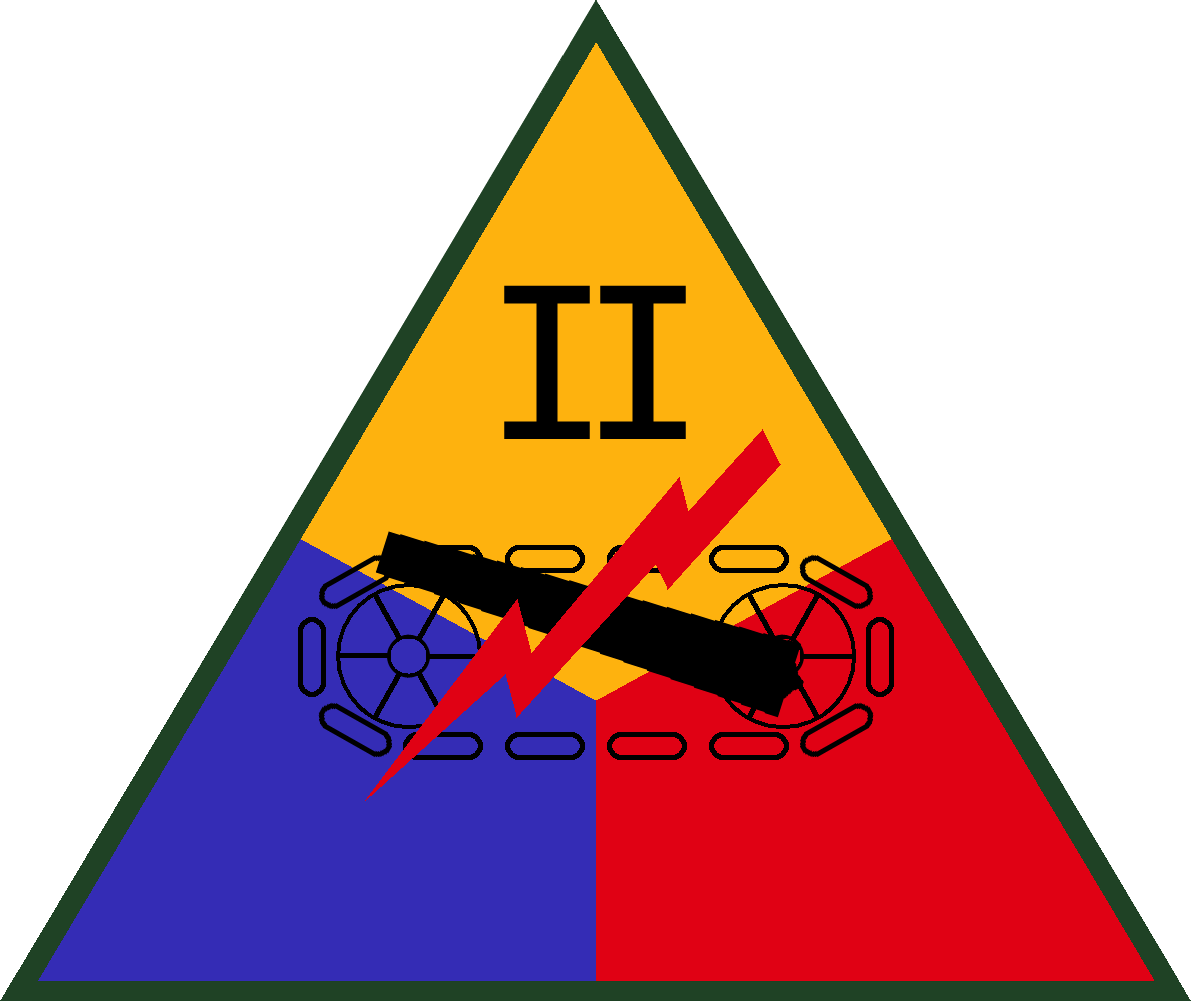
II Armored Corps

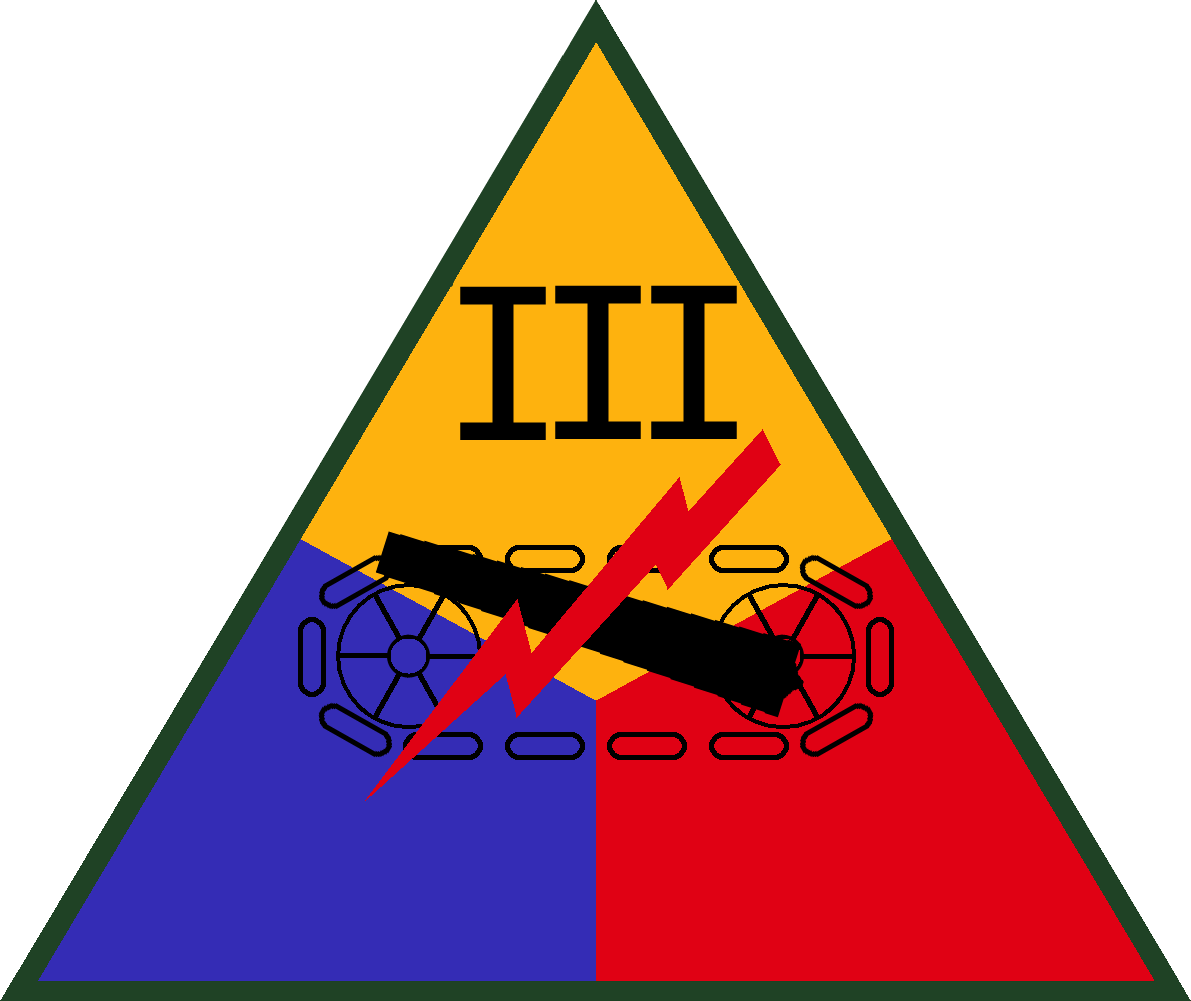
III Armored Corps

IV Corps

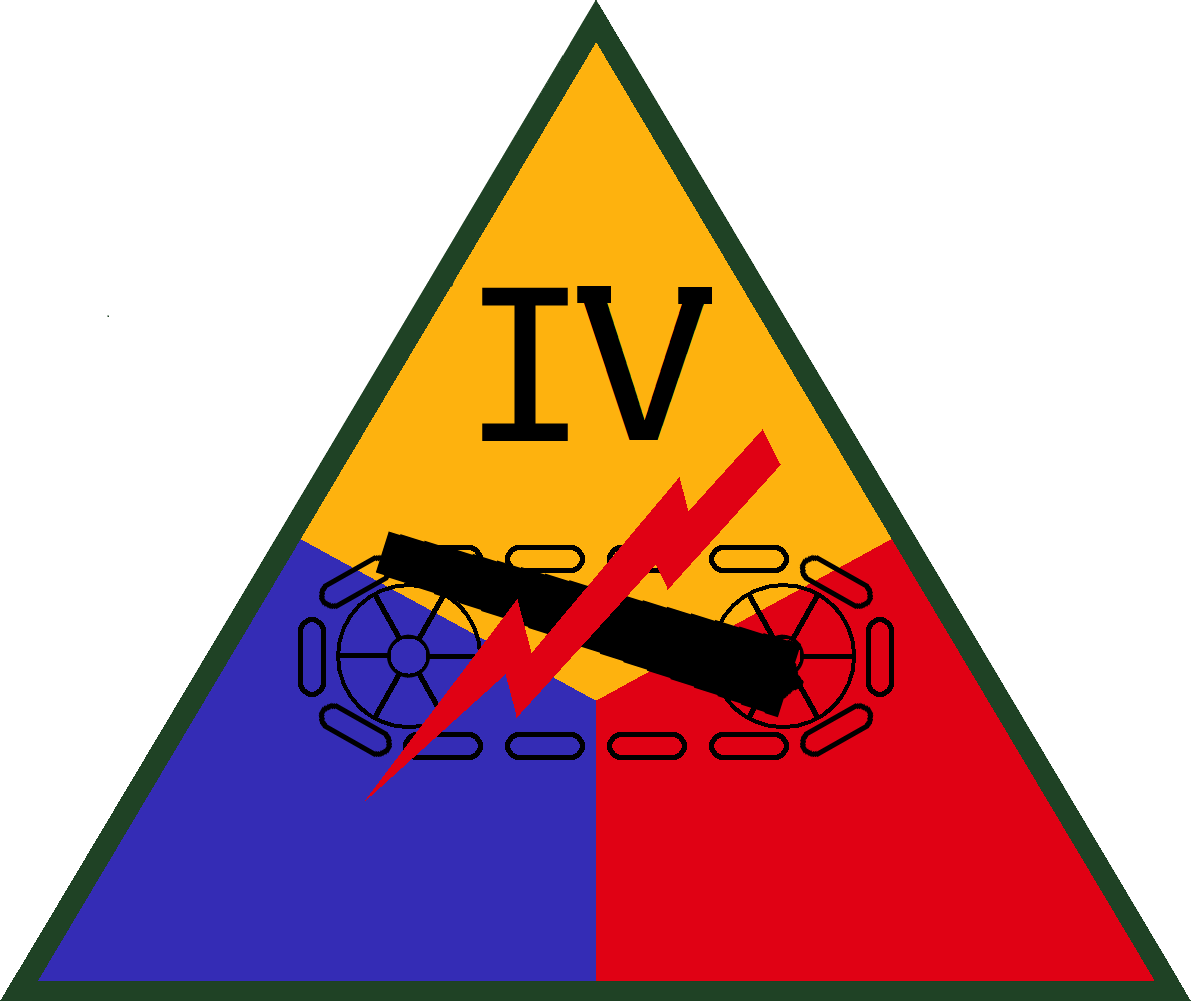
IV Armored Corps

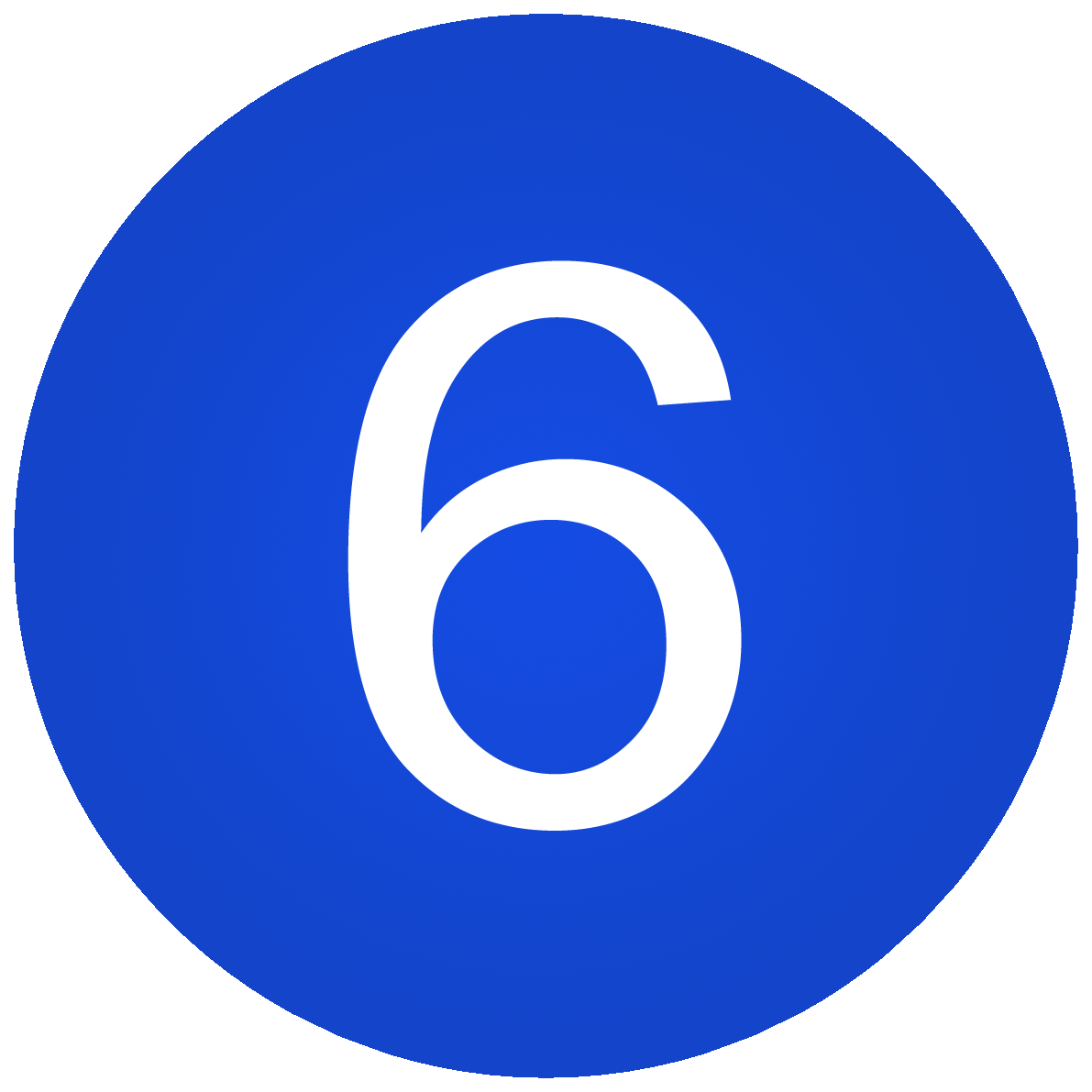
VI Corps

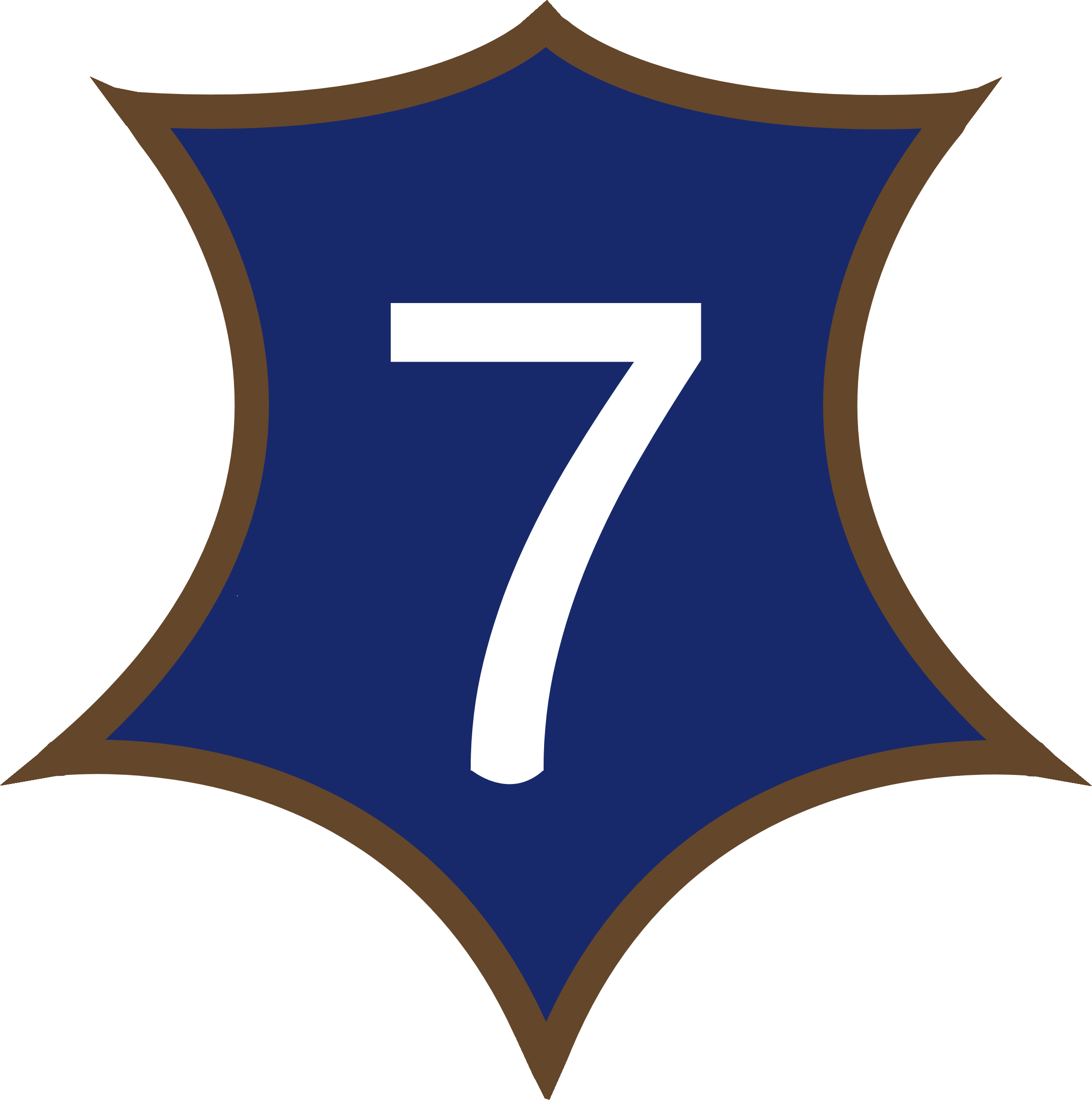
VII Corps

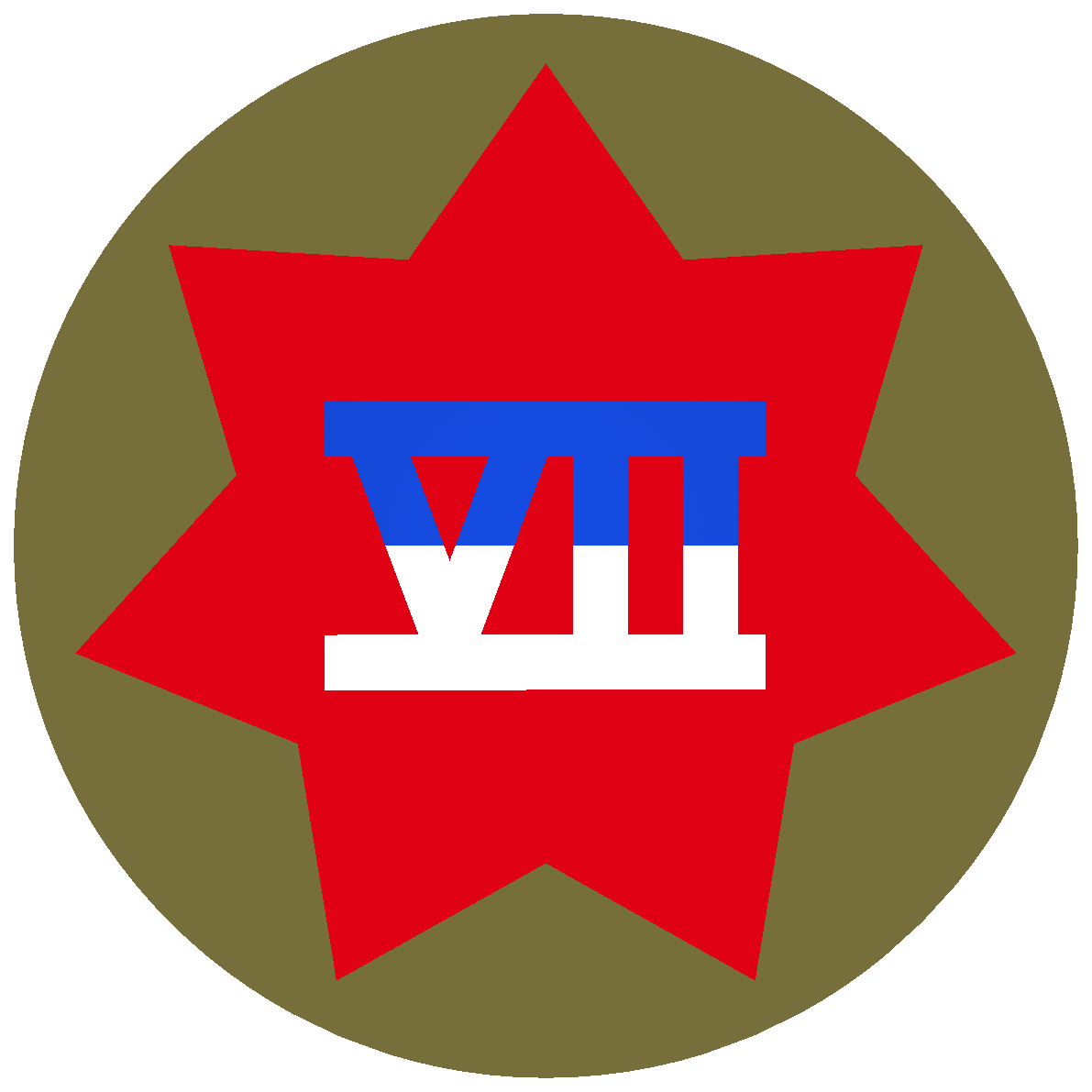
VII Corps

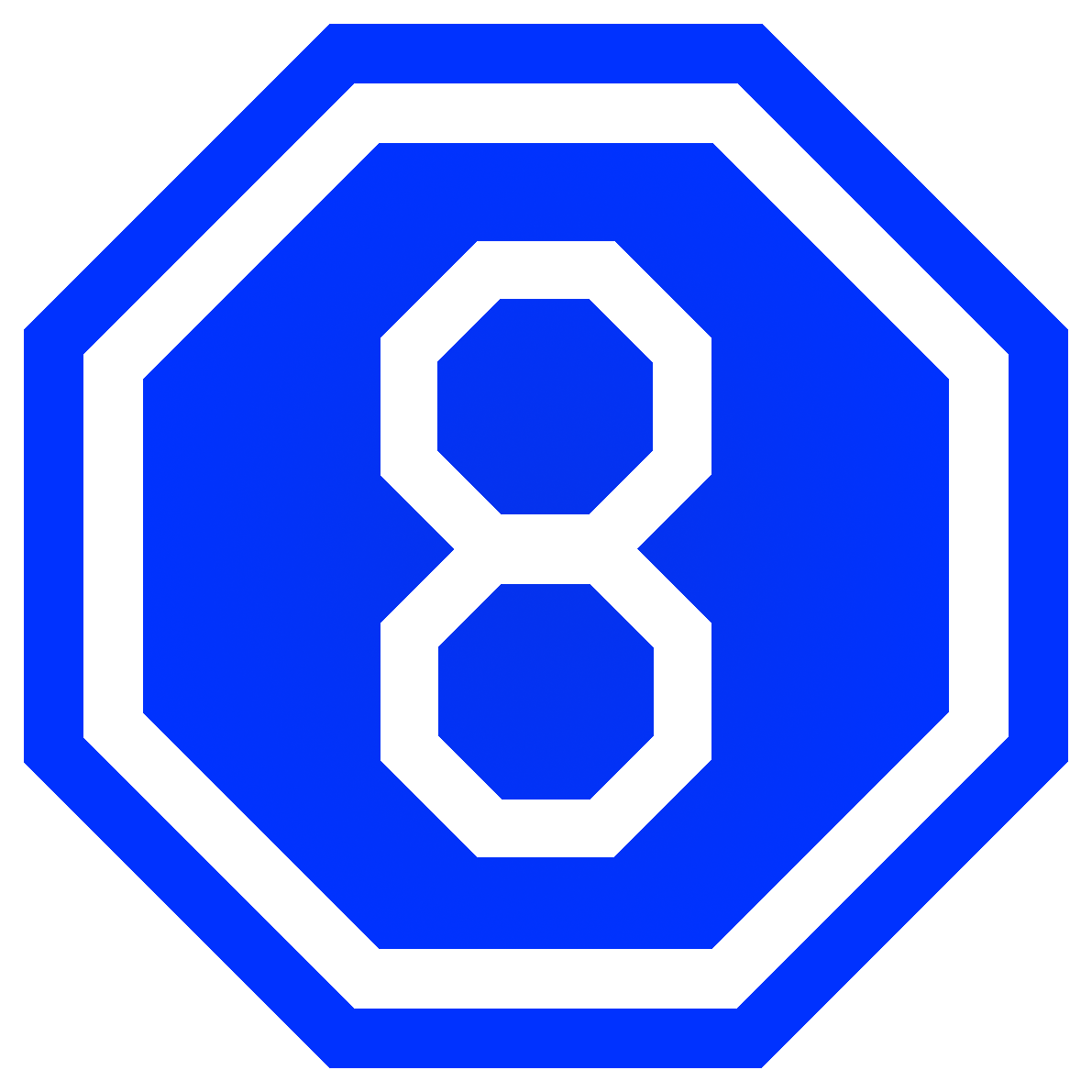
VIII Corps

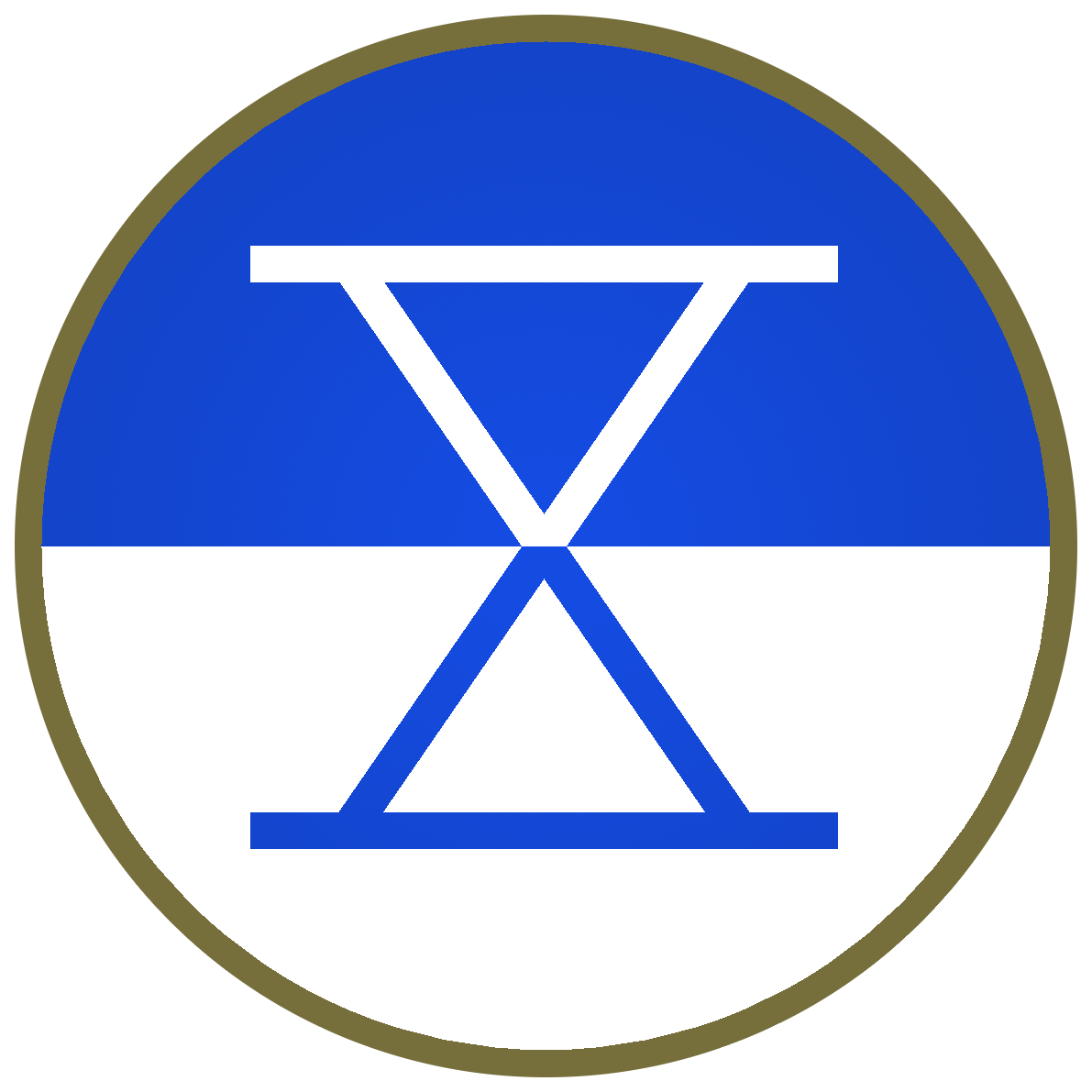
X Corps

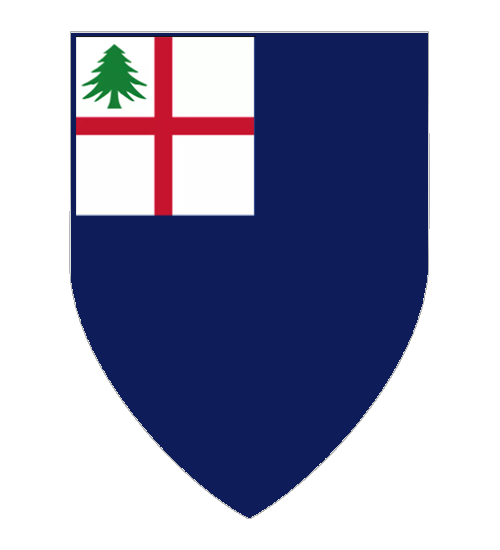
XI Corps

XI Corps

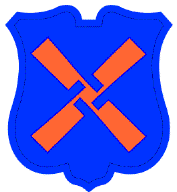
XII Corps

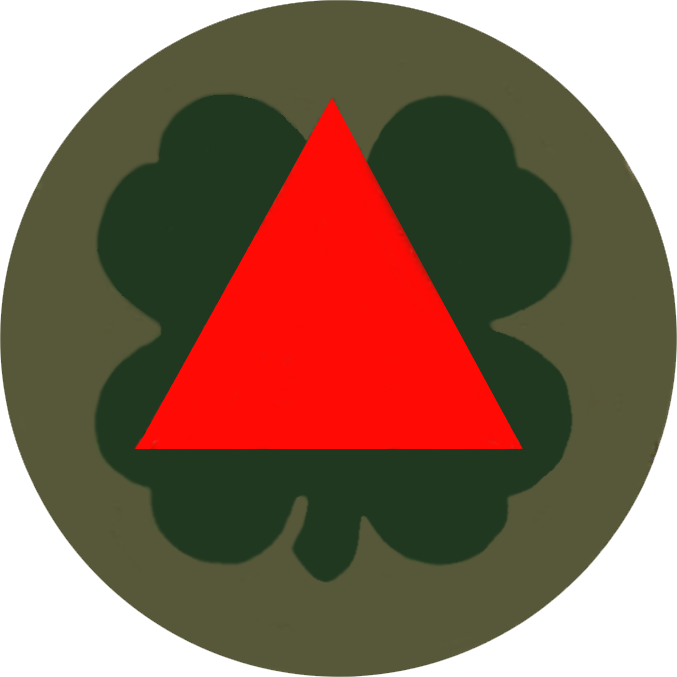
XIII Corps

XIV Corps

XV Corps

XVI Corps

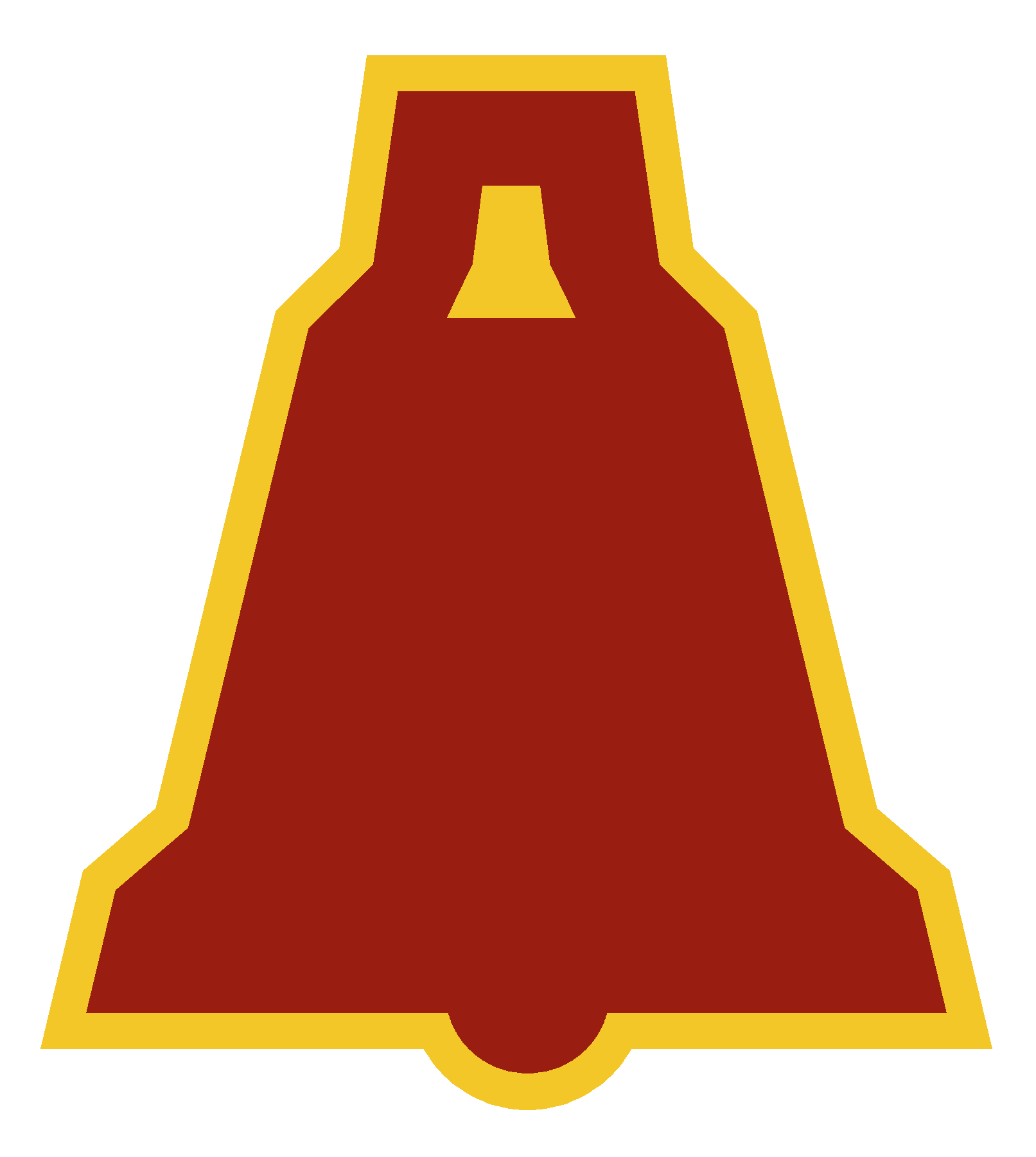
XIX Corps

XIX Corps

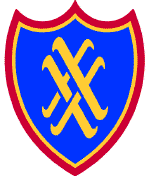
XX Corps

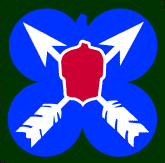
XXI Corps

XXII Corps

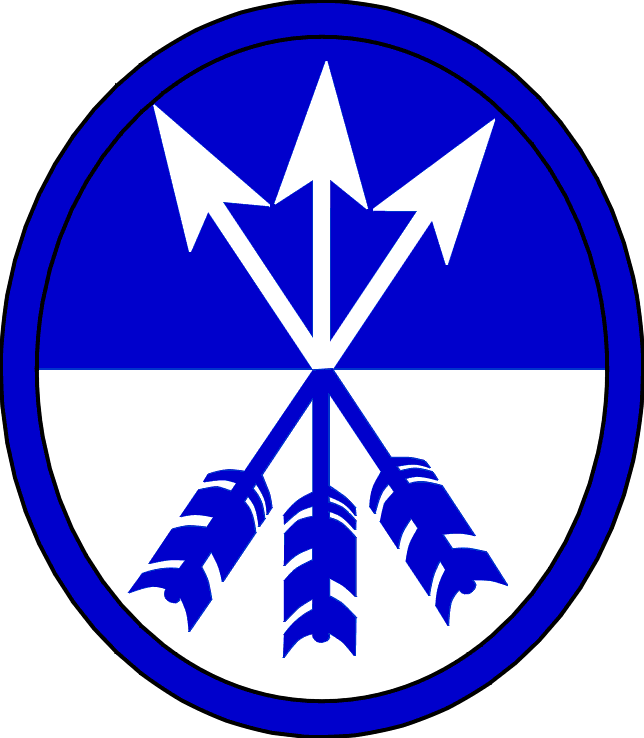
XXIII Corps

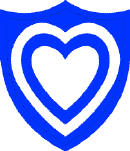
XXIV Corps

XXXVI Corps

== Departments ==
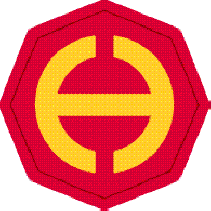
Hawaiian Department

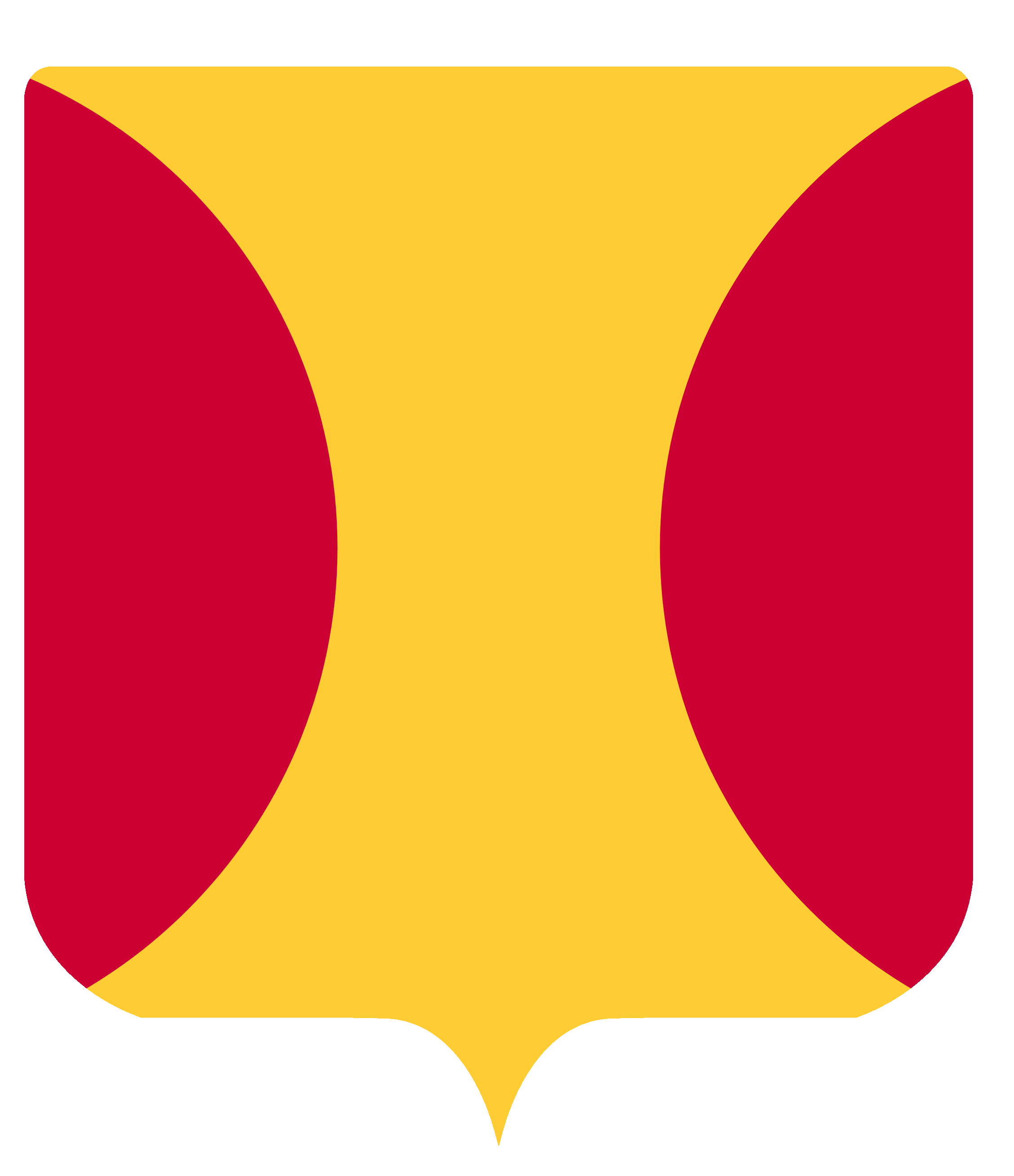
Panama Canal Department 1917–1947

Philippine Department 1911–1942

== Divisions ==
2nd Armored Division 1940–1995

2nd Cavalry Division 1940–1944*

3rd Armored Division 1941–1992*

4th Armored Division 1941–1972

5th Armored Division 1941–1956*

5th Infantry Division 1917–1992*

6th Armored Division 1942–1956*

6th Infantry Division 1917–1994*

7th Armored Division 1942–1953*

8th Armored Division 1942–1945

8th Infantry Division 1918–1992*

9th Armored Division 1942–1945

9th Infantry Division 1918–1991*

10th Armored Division 1942–1945

11th Armored Division 1942–1945

11th Infantry Division 1917–1918

12th Armored Division 1942–1945

12th Infantry Division 1918–1919

12th Infantry Division 1922–1947*

13th Airborne Division 1943–1946

13th Armored Division 1942–1952*

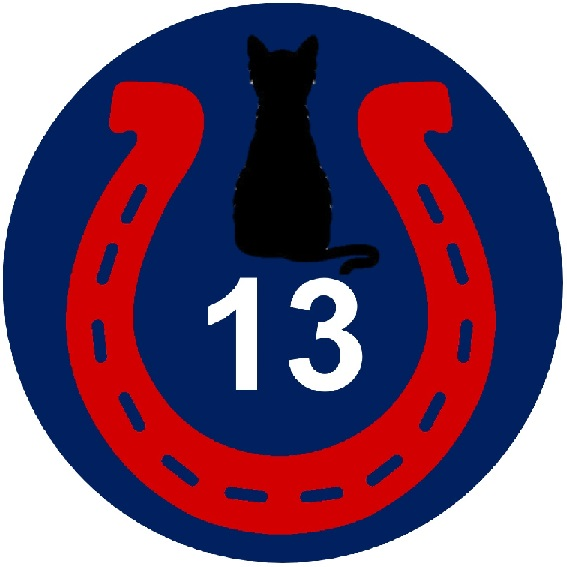
13th Infantry Division 1918–1919

14th Armored Division 1942–1945

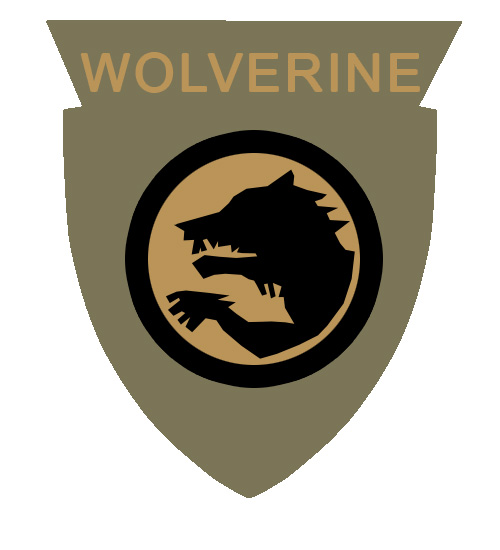
14th Infantry Division 1918–1919

16th Armored Division 1943–1945

17th Airborne Division 1943–1949*

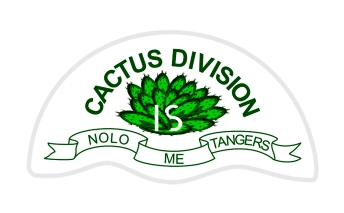
18th Infantry Division 1917–1919

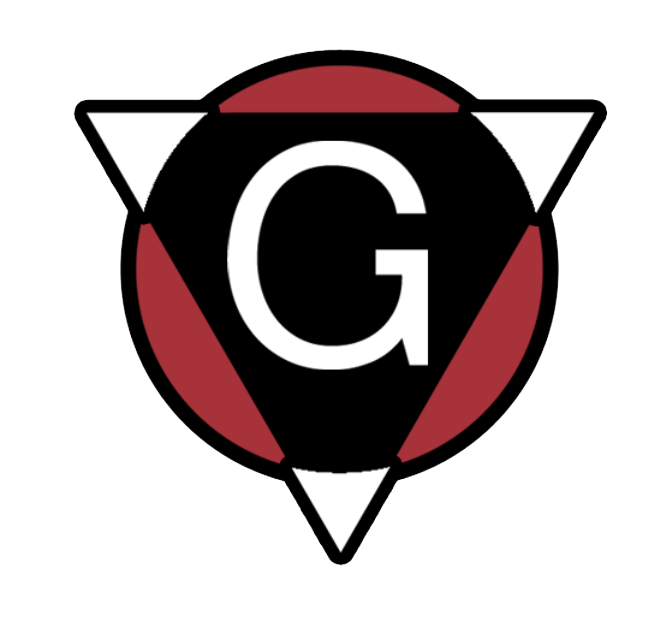
19th Infantry Division 1917–1947

20th Armored Division 1943–1946

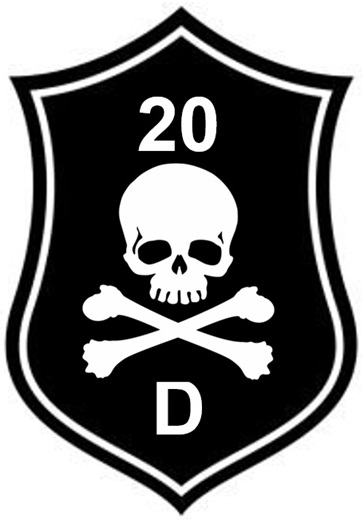
20th Infantry Division 1918–1919

21st Cavalry Division 1921–1940

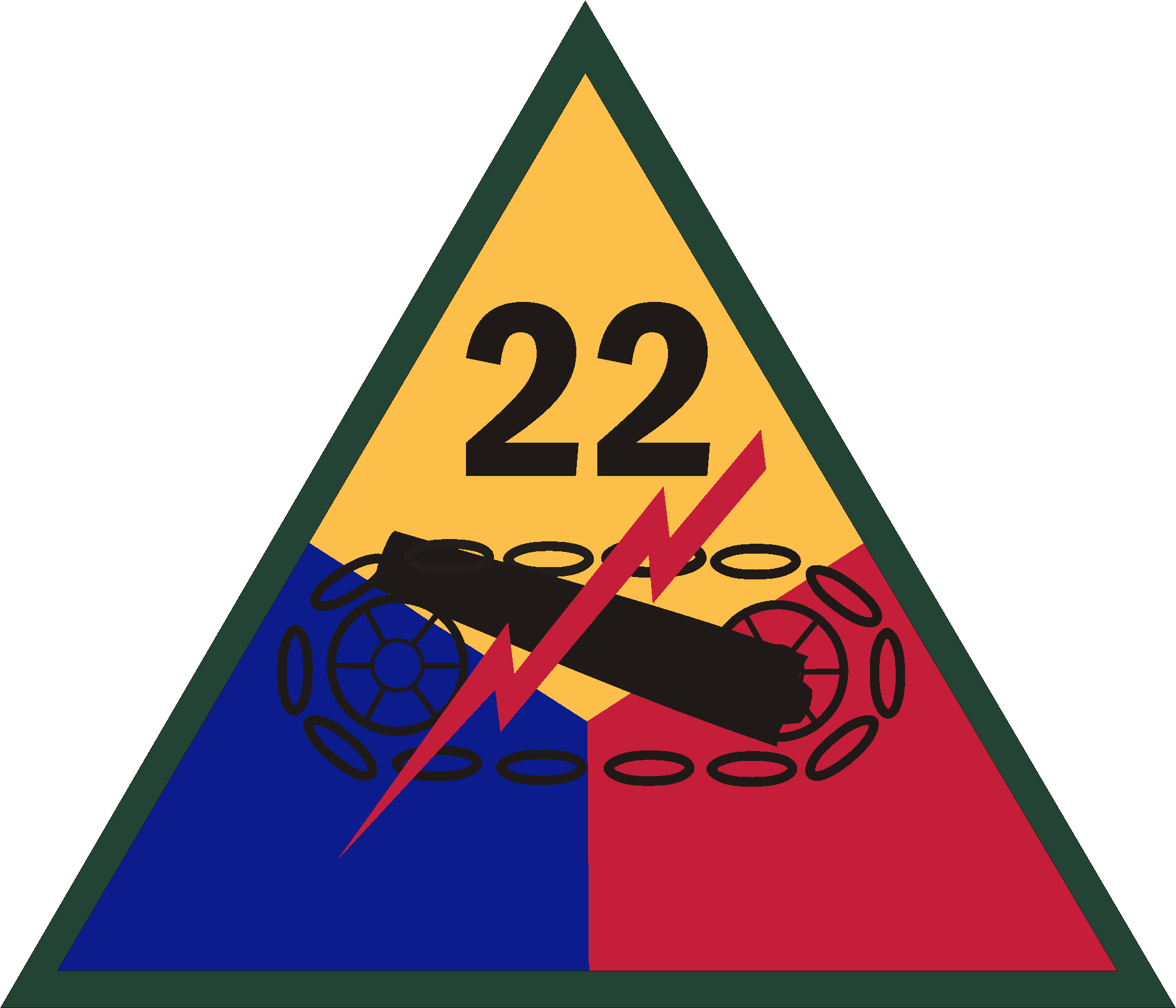
22nd Armored Division 1952–1953

23rd Infantry Division 1942–1971*

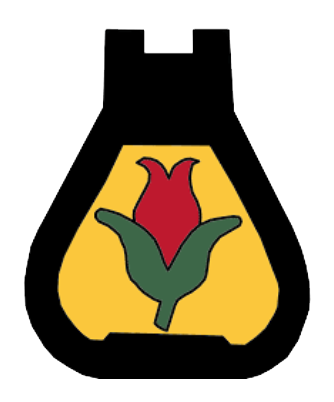
24th Cavalry Division 1921–1940

24th Infantry Division 1921–2006*

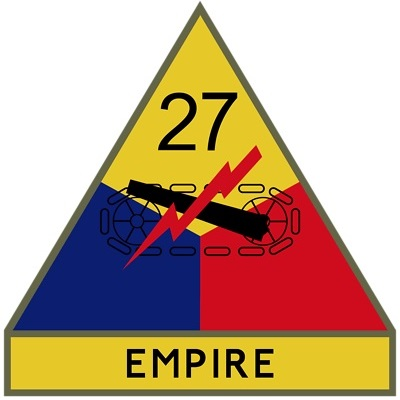
27th Armored Division 1955–1968

30th Armored Division 1954–1973

31st Infantry Division 1917–2024**

39th Infantry Division 1917–1967*

40th Armored Division 1954–1967

43rd Infantry Division 1925–1963*

45th Infantry Division 1923–1939

46th Infantry Division 1947–1968

47th Infantry Division 1946–1991

48th Armored Division 1955–1968

48th Infantry Division 1946–1955

49th Armored Division 1947–2004*

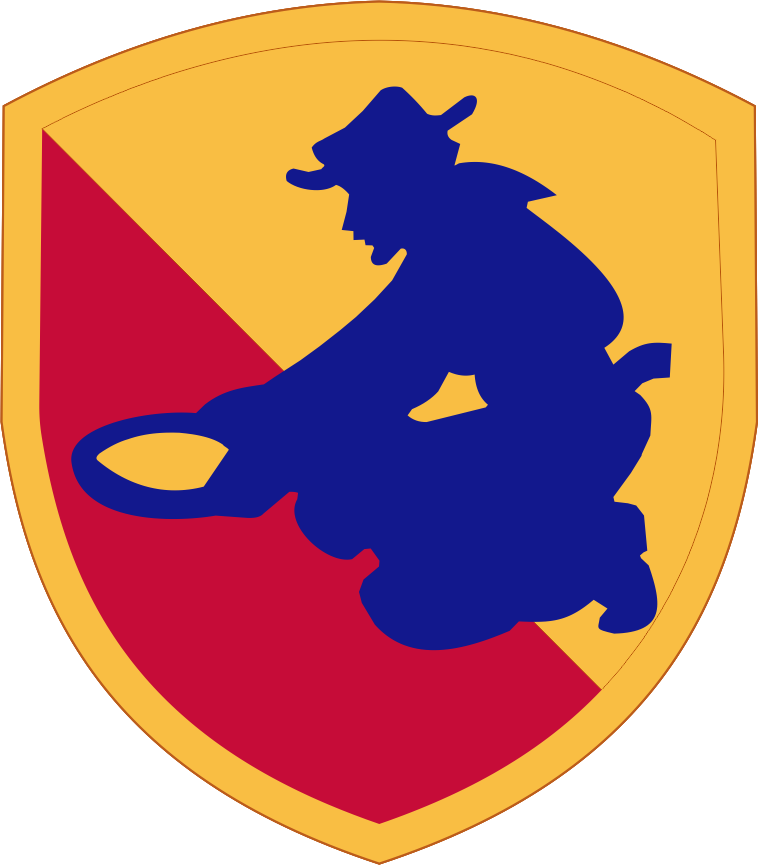
49th Infantry Division 1947–1968

50th Armored Division 1946–1993

51st Infantry Division 1946–1963

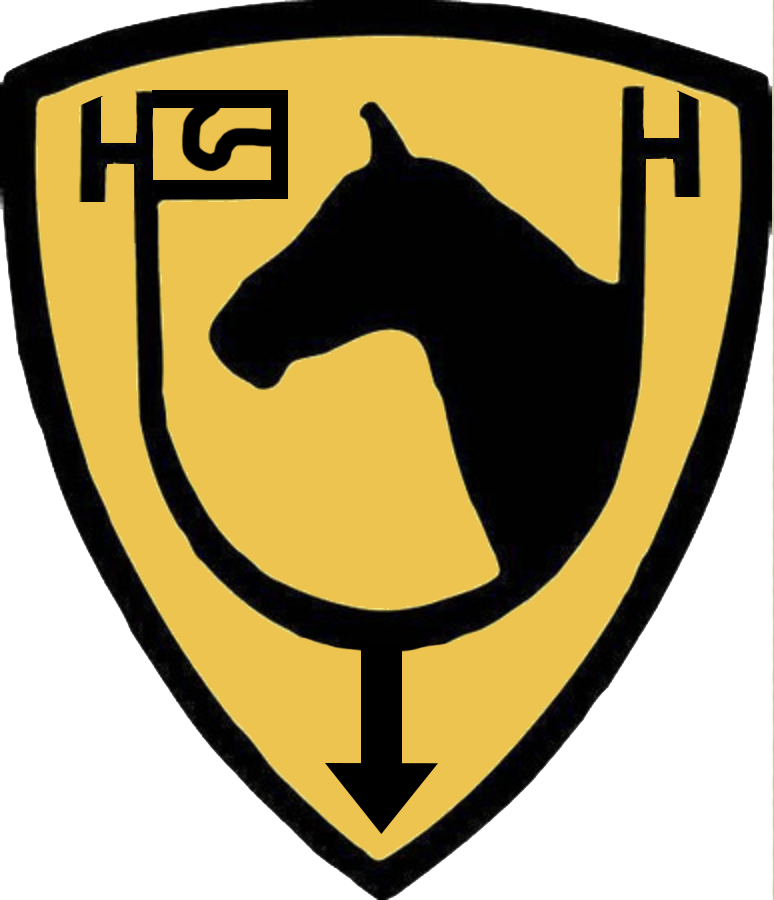
61st Cavalry Division 1921–1942

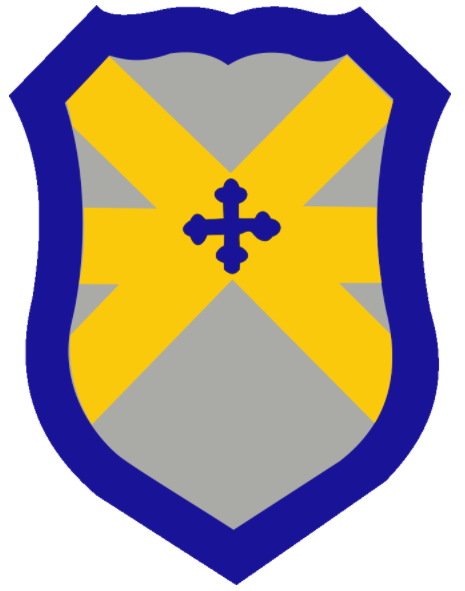
62nd Cavalry Division 1921–1942

63rd Cavalry Division 1921–1942

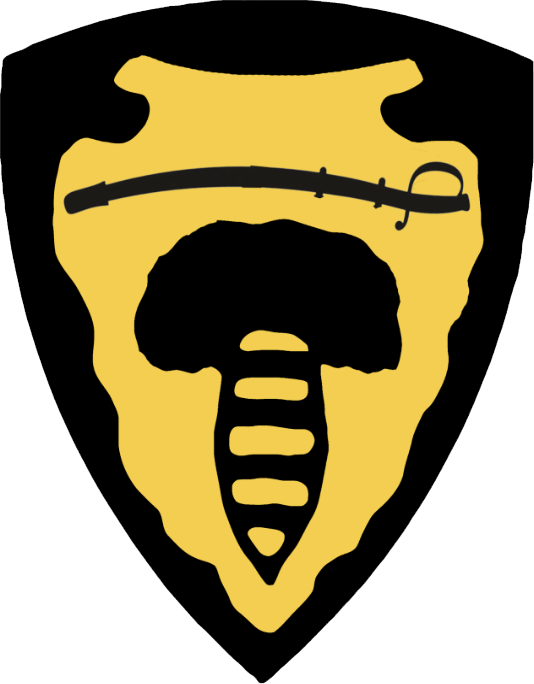
64th Cavalry Division 1921–1942

65th Cavalry Division 1921–1942

65th Infantry Division 1943–1945

66th Cavalry Division 1921–1942

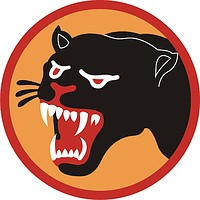
66th Infantry Division 1943–1945

69th Infantry Division 1943–1956*

70th Infantry Division 1943–1996*

71st Infantry Division 1943–1956*

92nd Infantry Division 1917–1945*

93rd Infantry Division 1917–1945*

106th Infantry Division 1943–1950*

== Field armies ==
First Allied Airborne Army 1944 –1945

Second Army 1918–2017*

Fourth Army 1932–1991*

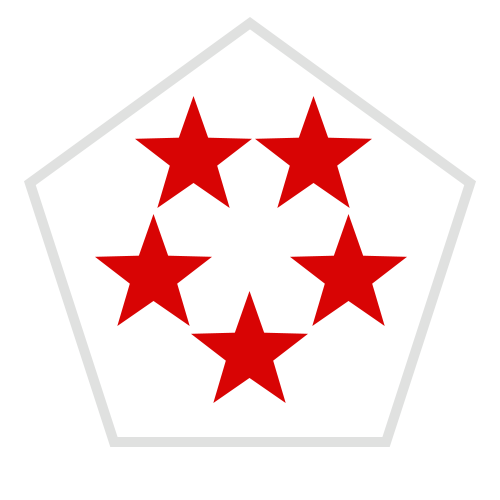
Fifth Army 1926–1933

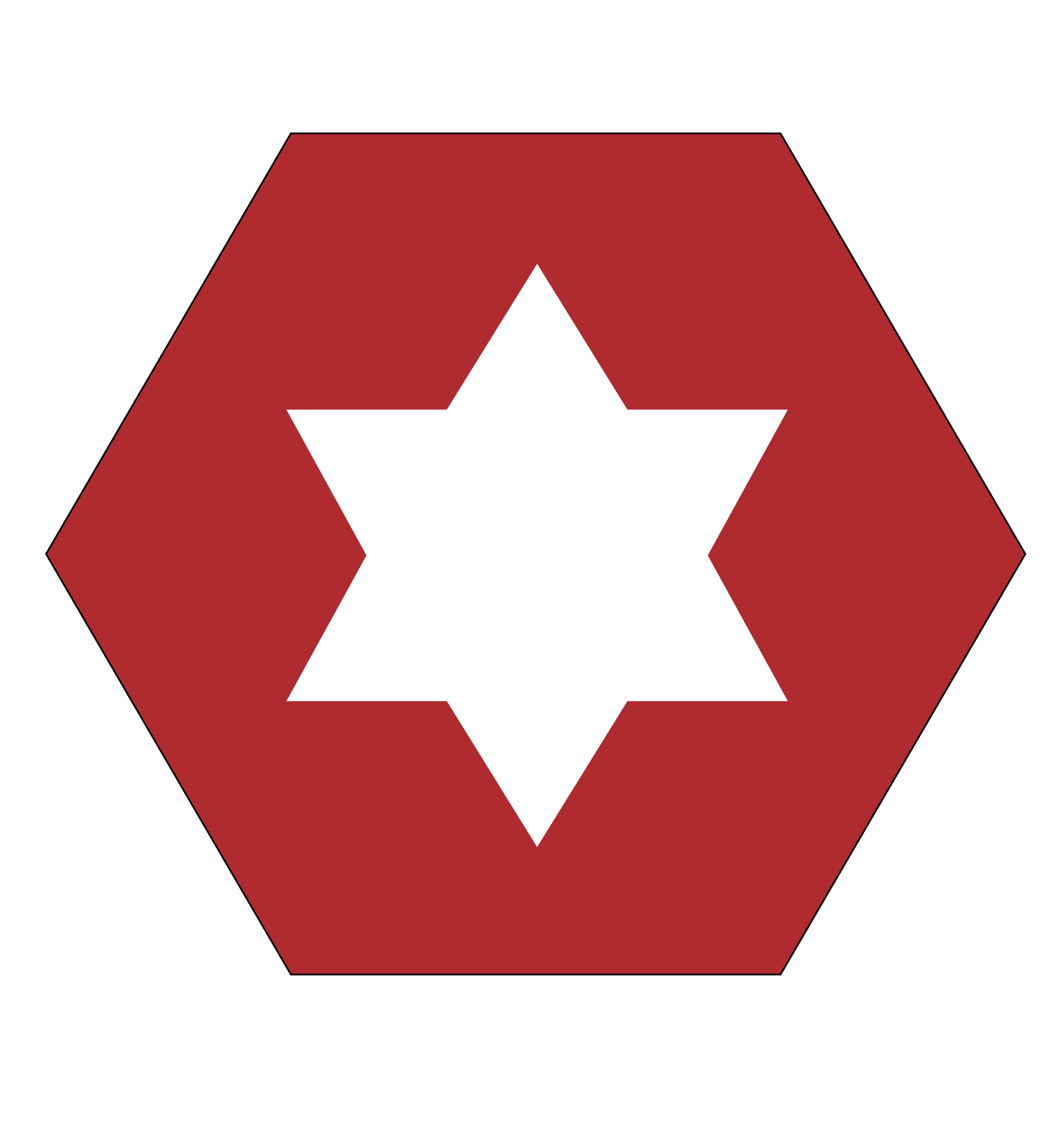
Sixth Army 1927–1945

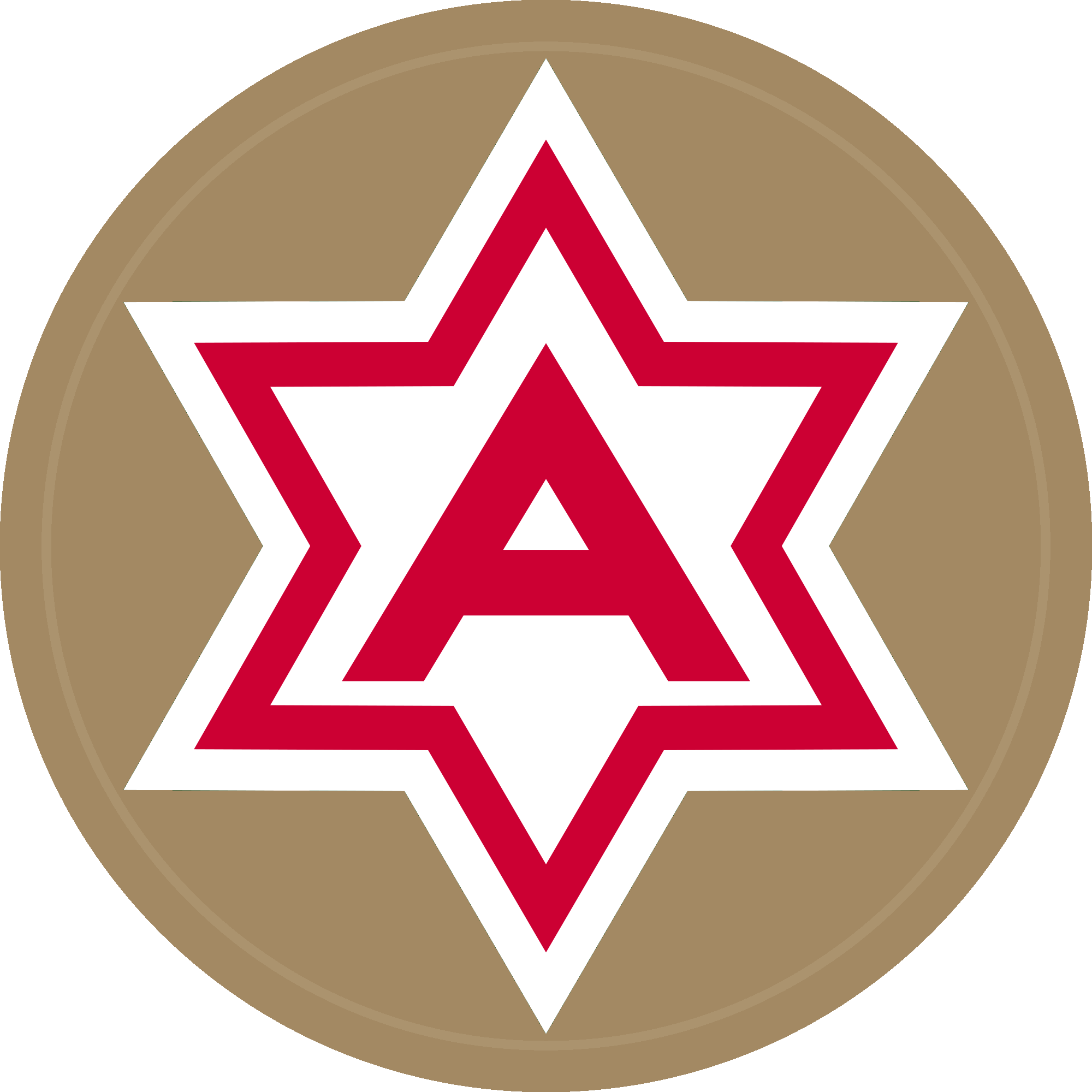
Sixth Army (1950s era)

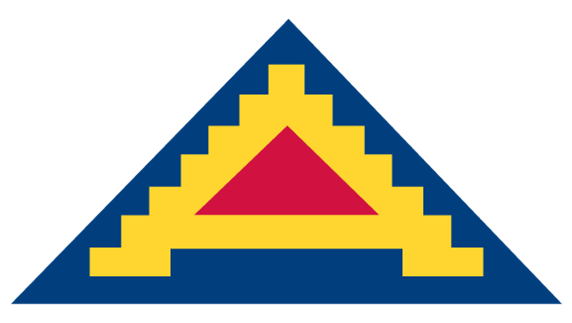
Seventh Army 1943–2010*

Ninth Army 1944–2020*

Tenth Army 1944–1945

Fifteenth Army 1944–1946

== Missile commands (1957-1978) ==
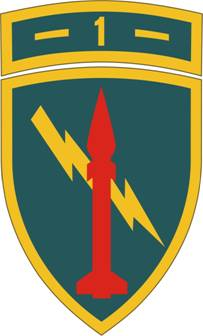
1st Missile Command

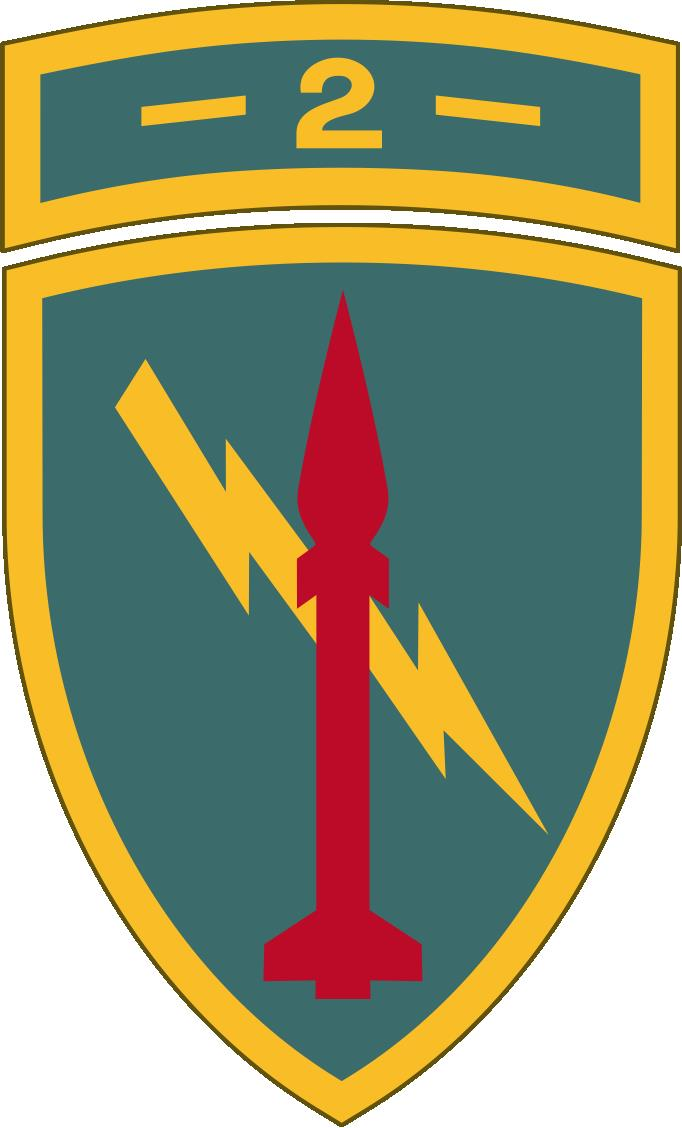
2nd Missile Command

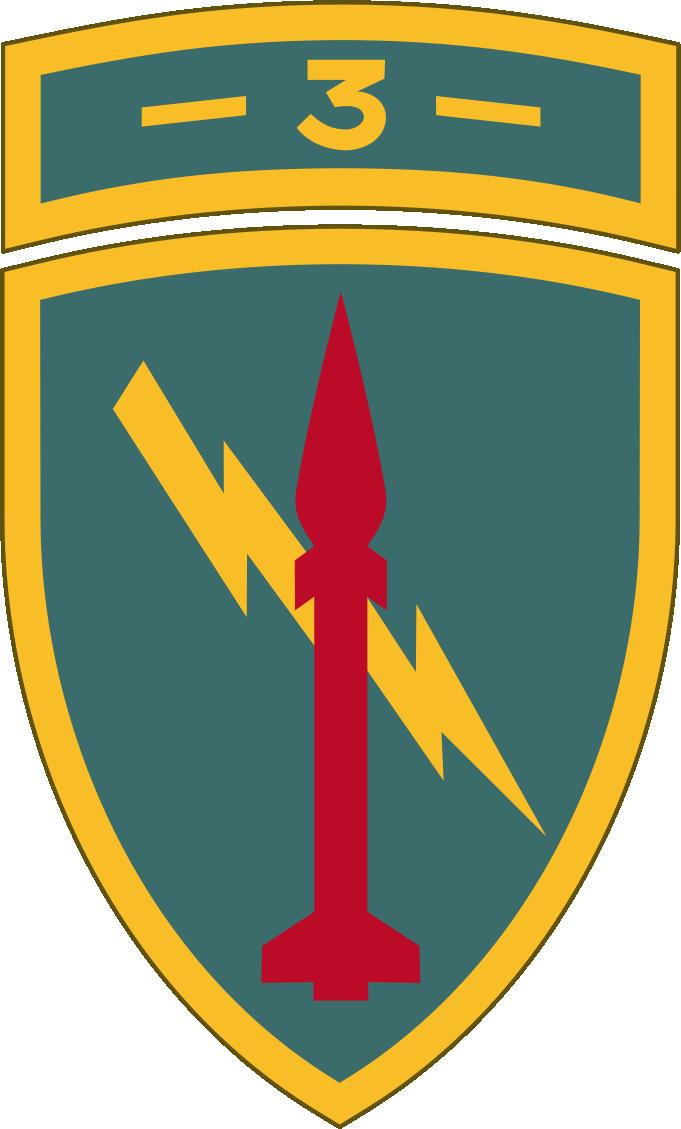
3rd Missile Command

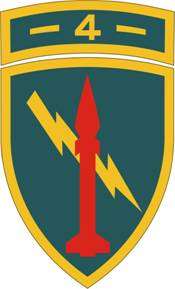
4th Missile Command

== Schools and educational units ==
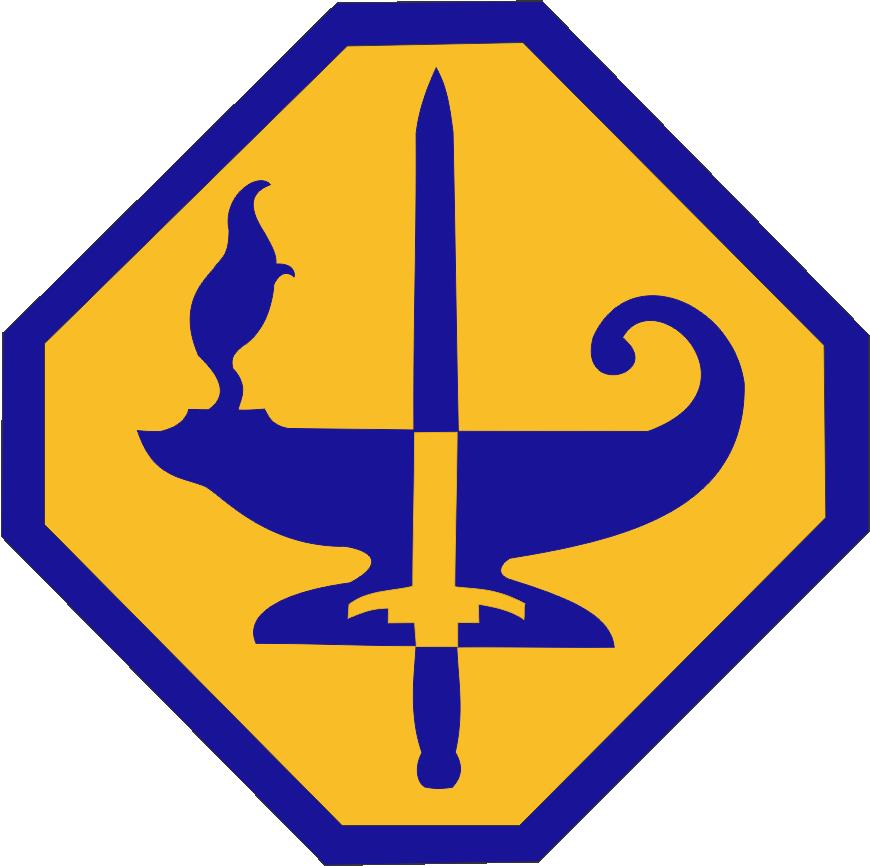
Army Specialized Training Program

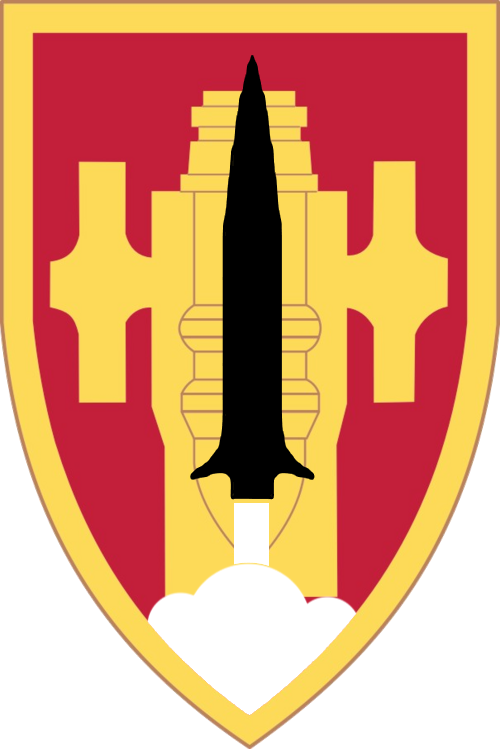
Artillery and Missile School
1956–1968

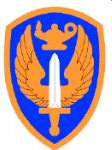
Aviation Logistics School

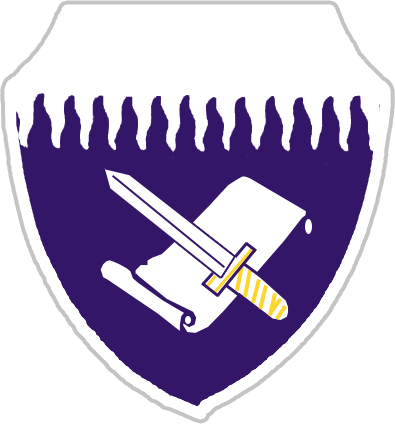
Civil Affairs School
1943–1971

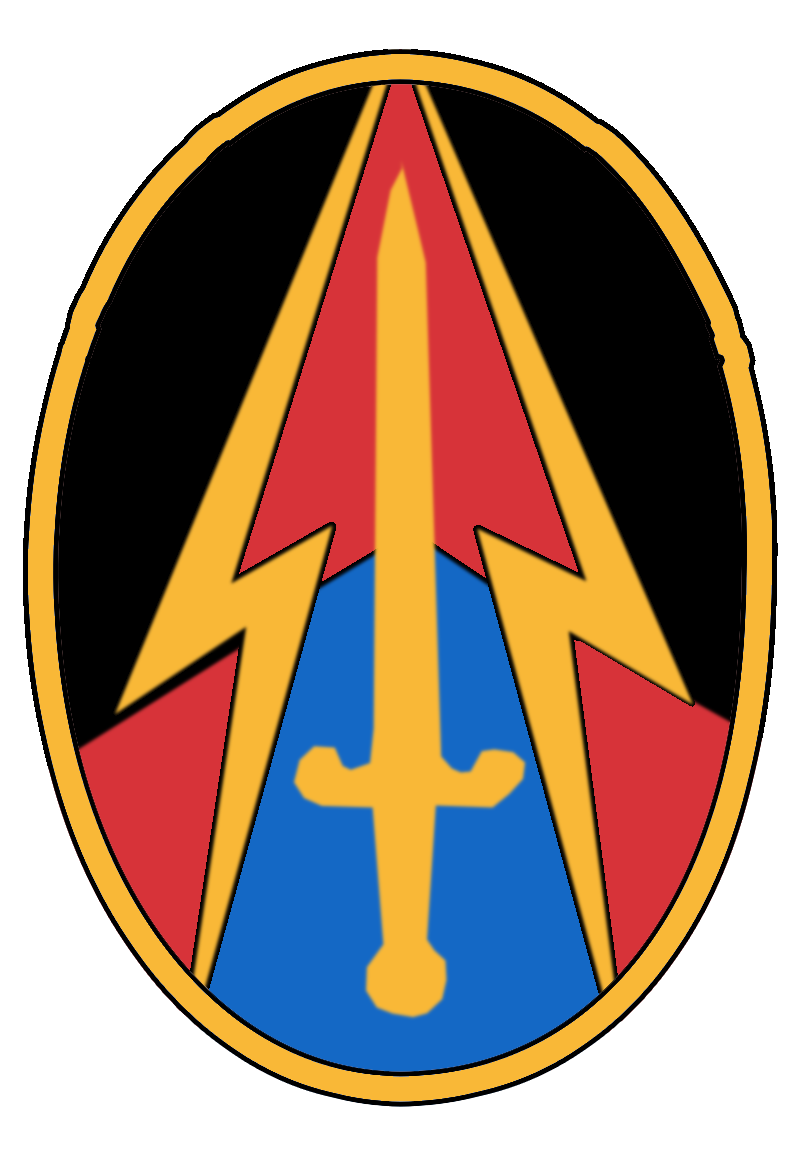
Combat Surveillance and Electronics Warfare School

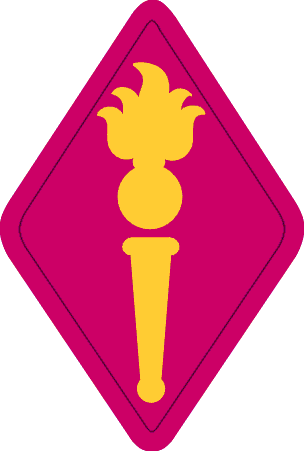
Ordnance Center and School

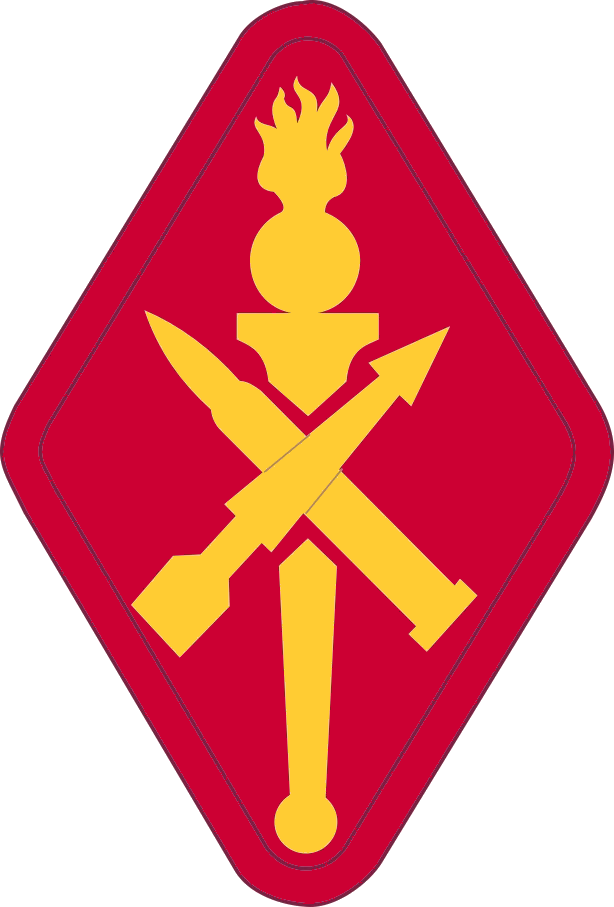
Ordnance Missile and Munitions School
1966–1994

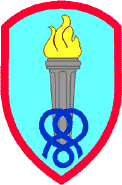
Soldier Support Institute

== Service commands (1942-1945) ==
I Service Command

II Service Command

III Service Command

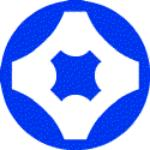
IV Service Command

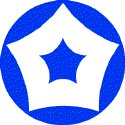
V Service Command

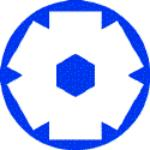
VI Service Command

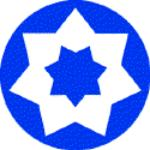
VII Service Command

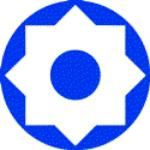
VIII Service Command

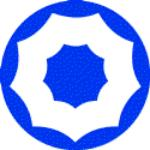
IX Service Command

Northwest Service Command

== Other ==
1st Special Service Force 1942–1944

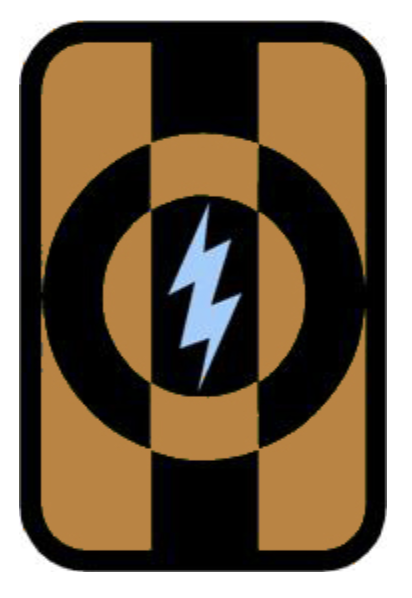
49th Quartermaster Group 1936–2013*

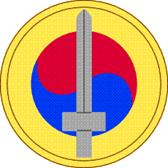
175th Finance Support Center

357th Air & Missile Defense Detachment 2008–2011

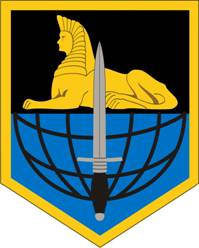
902nd Military Intelligence Group

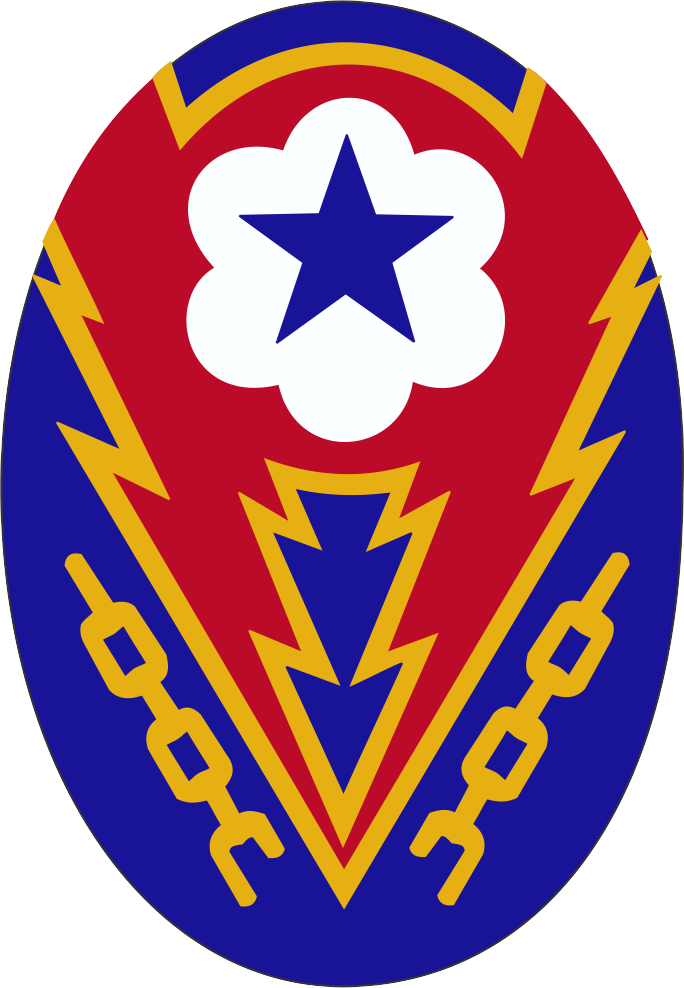
Advance Section of the Communications Zone (ADSEC) 1944–1945

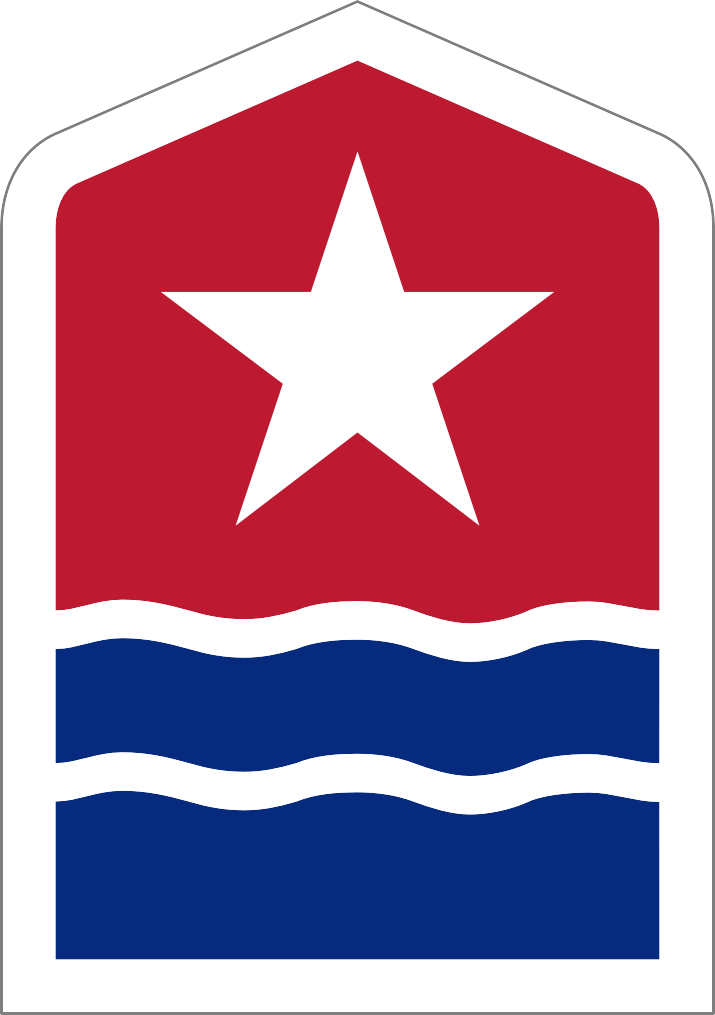
Africa-Middle East Theater

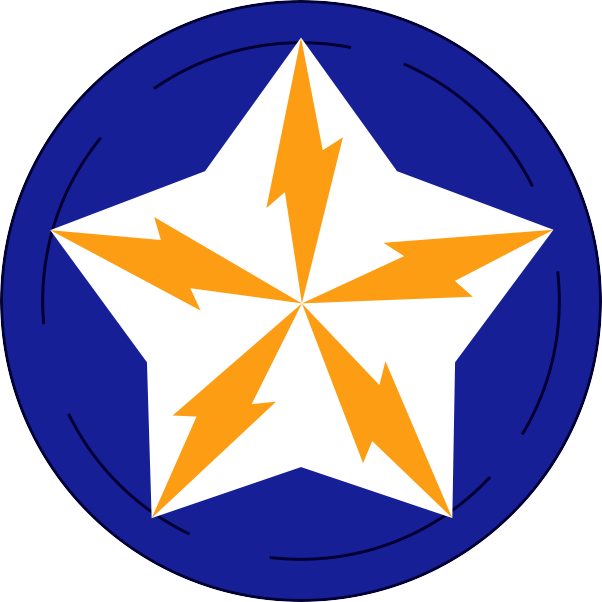
Alaska Communications System 1954–1963

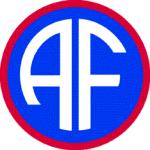
Allied Force Headquarters 1942–1945

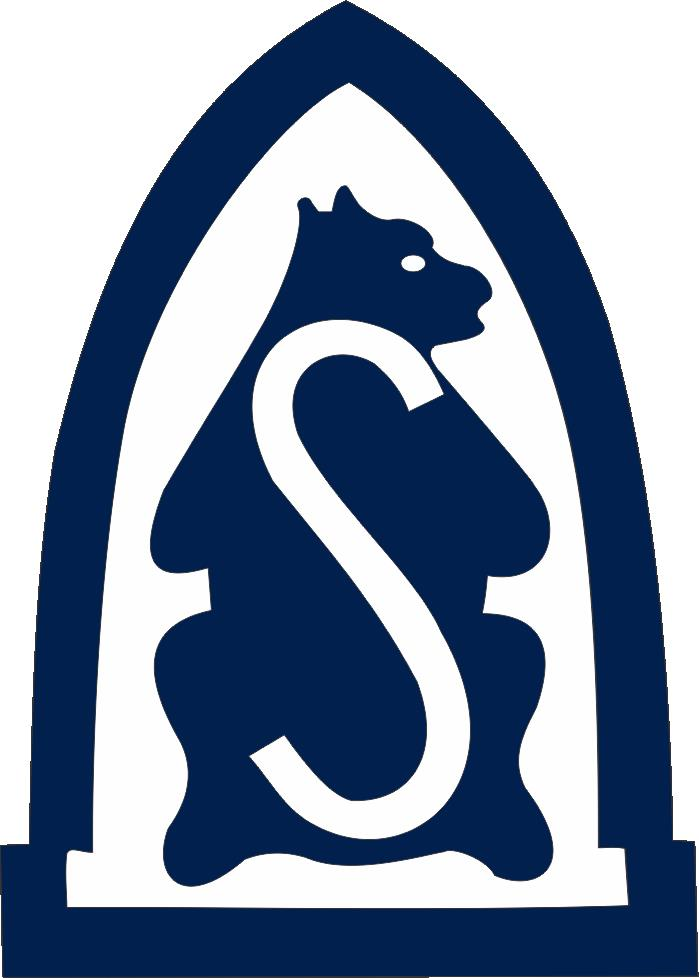
American Expeditionary Force Siberia 1918–1920

Armed Forces Special Weapons Project

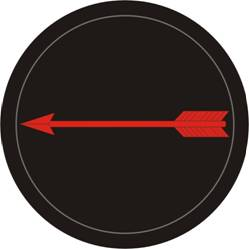
Asymmetric Warfare Group 2006–2021

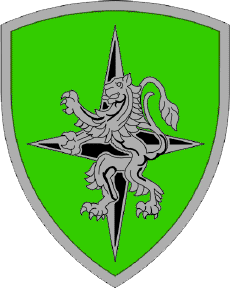
Central Army Group (CENTAG) 1952–2013

China Burma India Theater

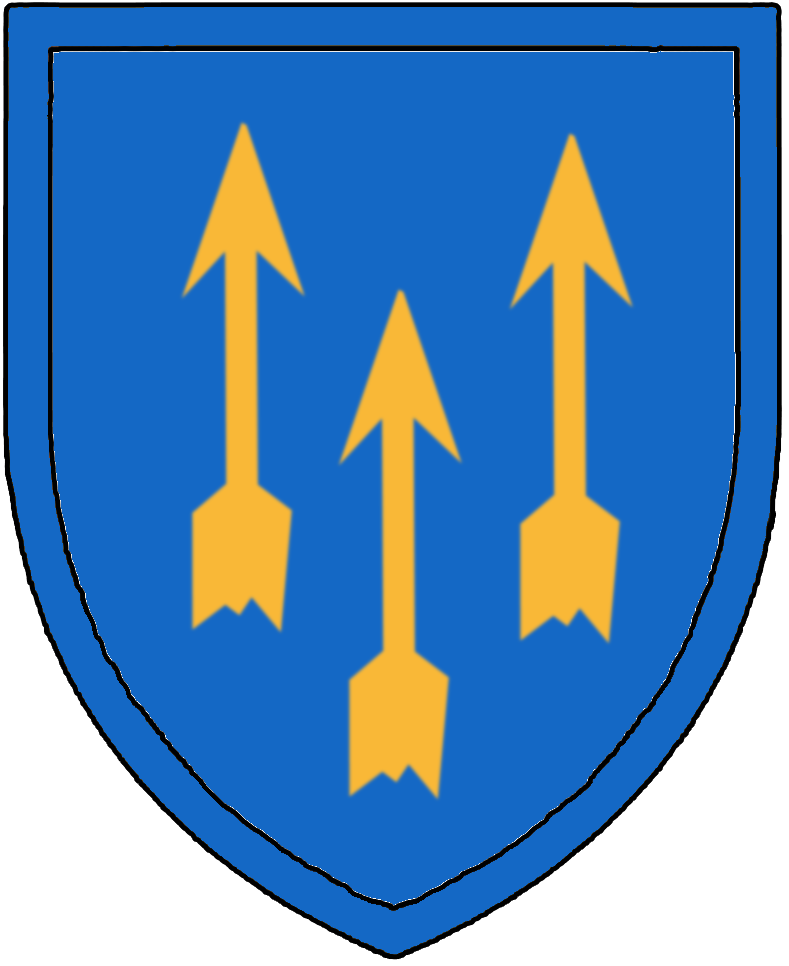
Defense Atomic Support Agency

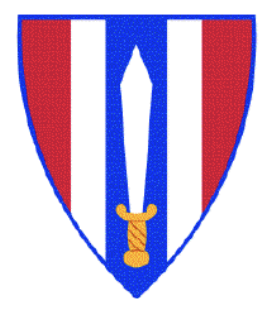
European Civil Affairs Division 1944–1945

European Theater of Operations, United States Army (ETOUSA) 1942–1945

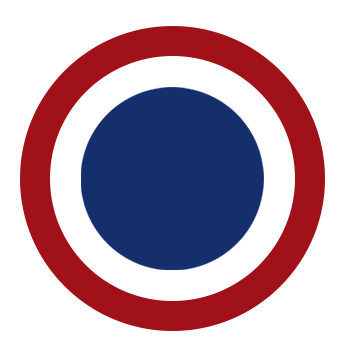
Ground Forces Replacement Depot

International Security Assistance Force (ISAF)

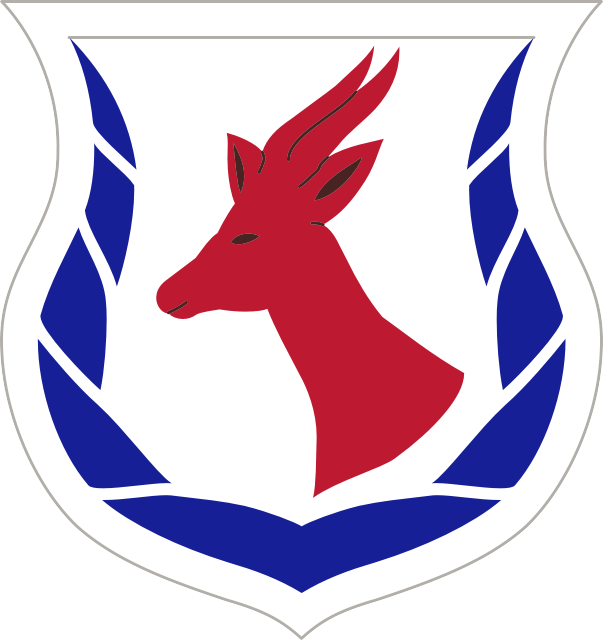
Kagnew Station - East Africa

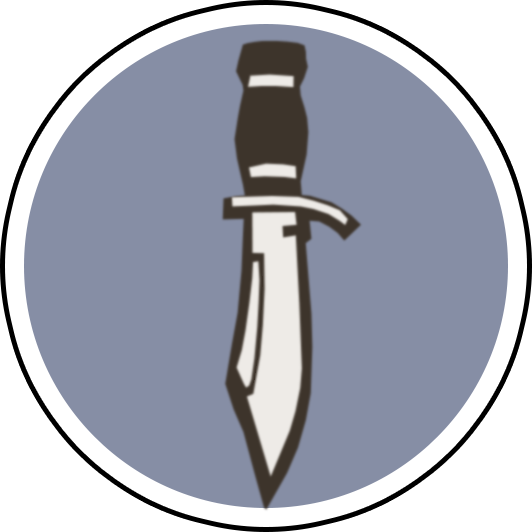
Kiska Task Force (1942–1943)

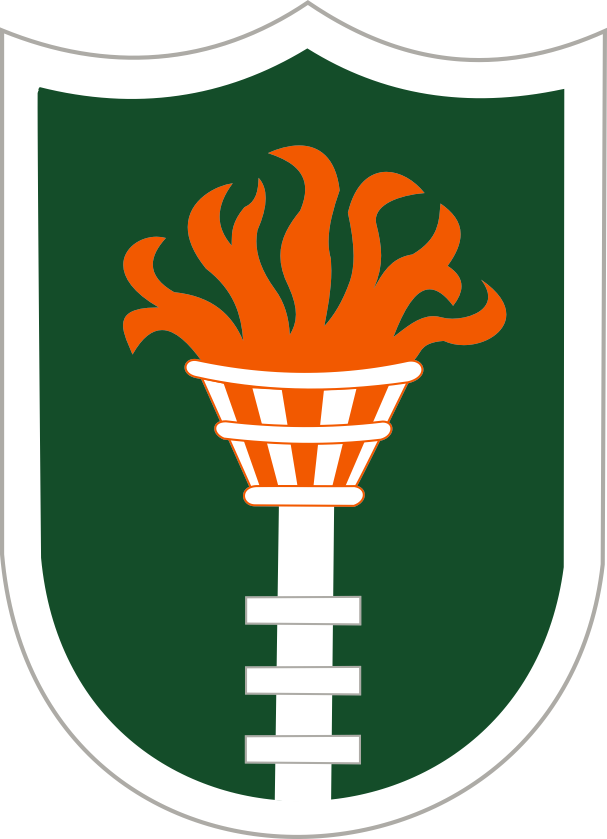
Korean Communications Zone (KCOMZ)

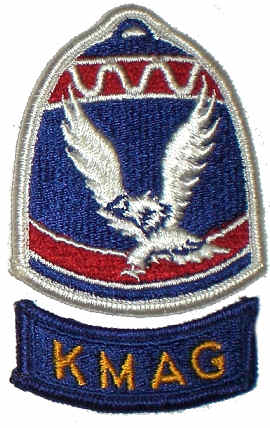
Korean Military Advisory Group 1948–1954

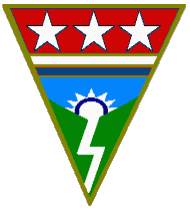
Ledo Road

Manhattan Project 1942–1946

Mediterranean / North Africa Theater

MIKE Force

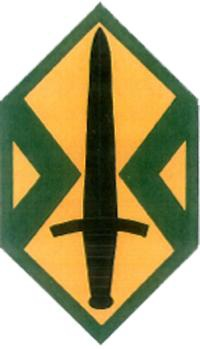
Military Police Panama

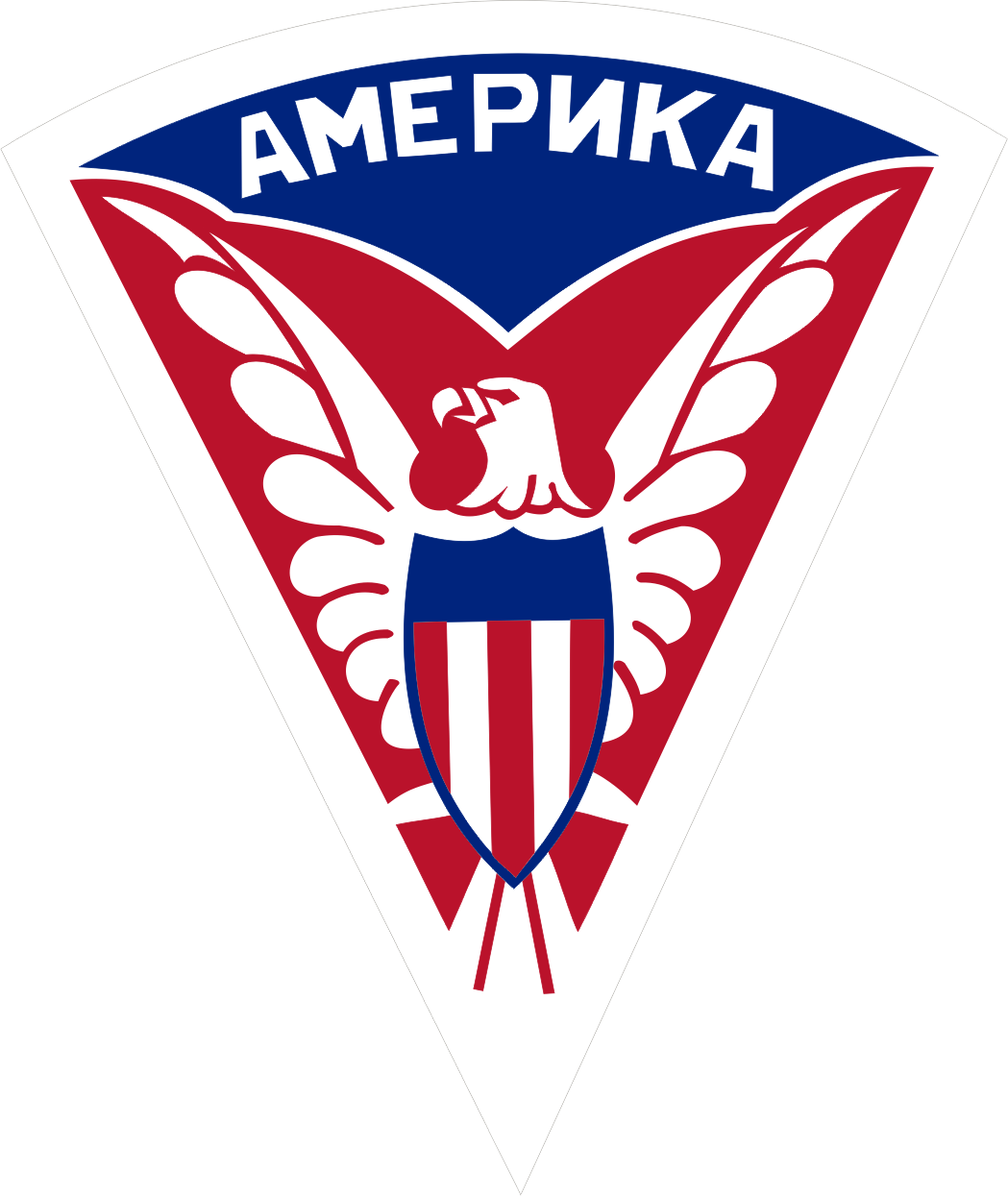
Moscow Mission 1941–1945

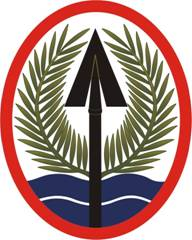
Multi-National Corps – Iraq (MNC-I)
2004–2009

Multi-National Force – Iraq (MNF-I) 2004–2009

NATO Training Mission-Afghanistan (NTM-A)
2009–2014

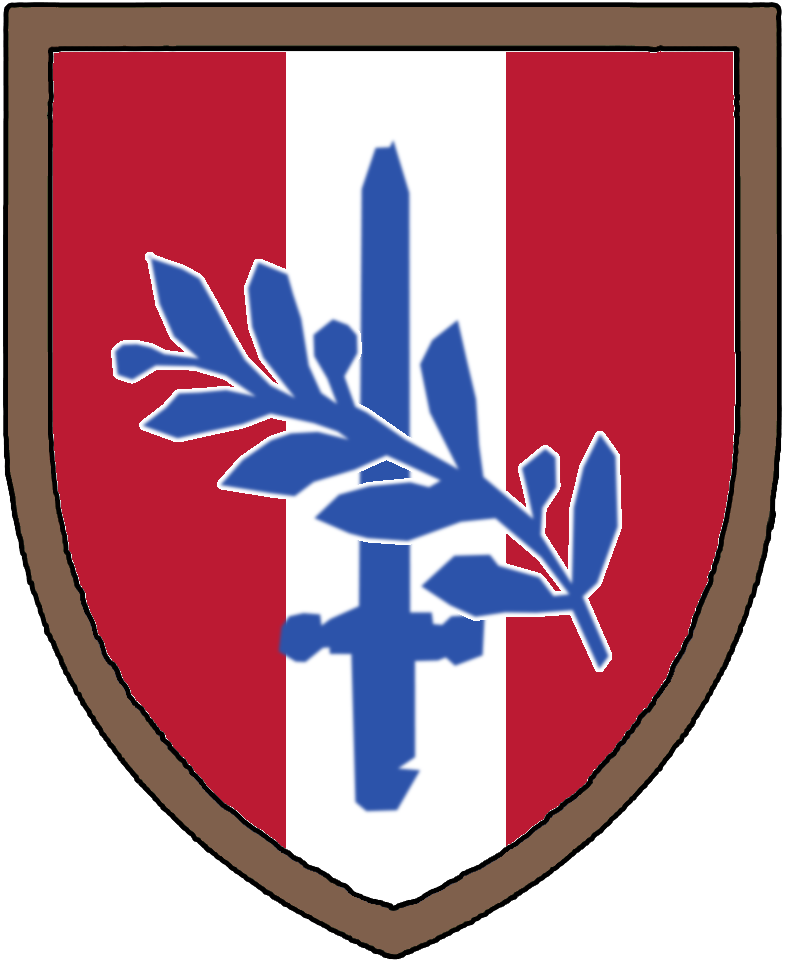
Occupation Forces - Austria

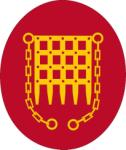
Panama Canal Division 1921–1932

Army Rangers

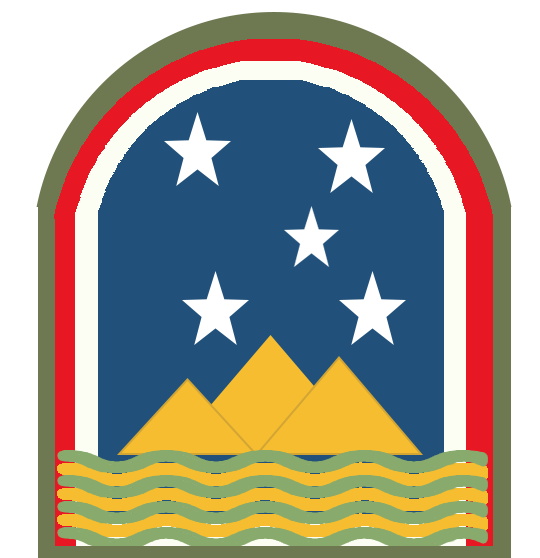
South Atlantic Theater

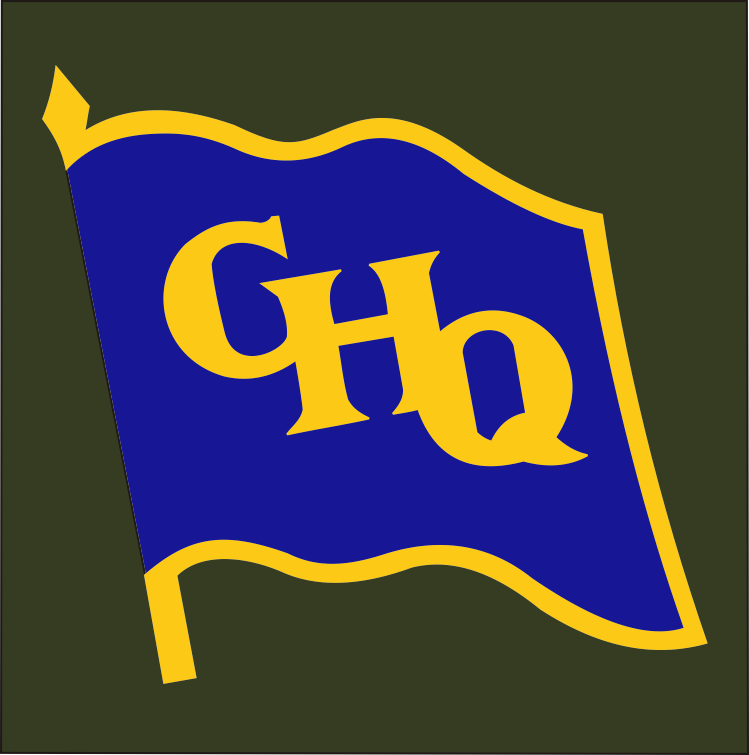
South West Pacific Area General Headquarters
1942–1945

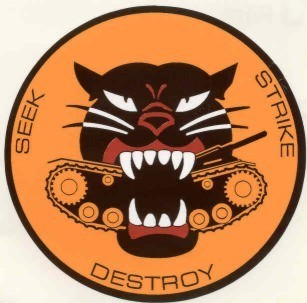
Tank Destroyer Forces

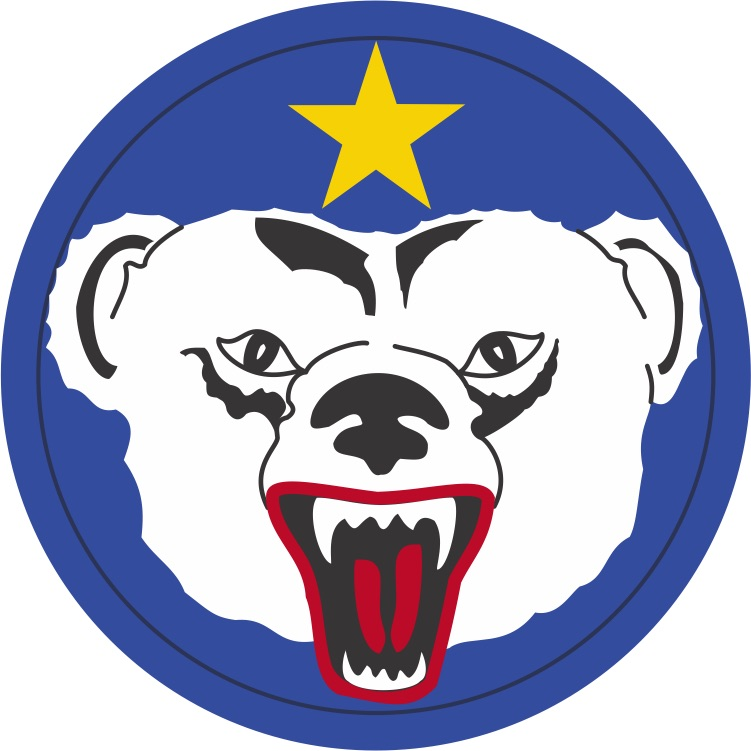
US Army Alaska 1994–2022

US Army South (ARSOUTH)
1986–2026

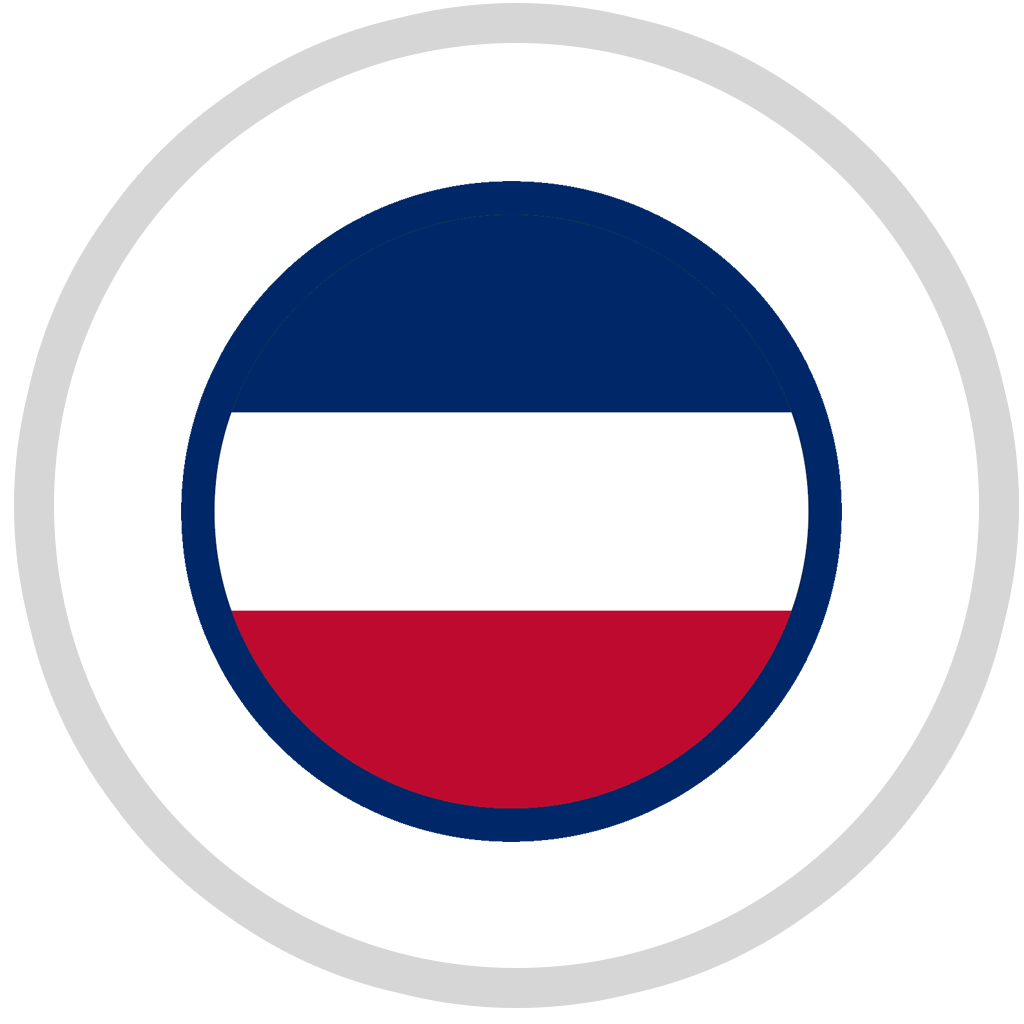
US Army General Headquarters

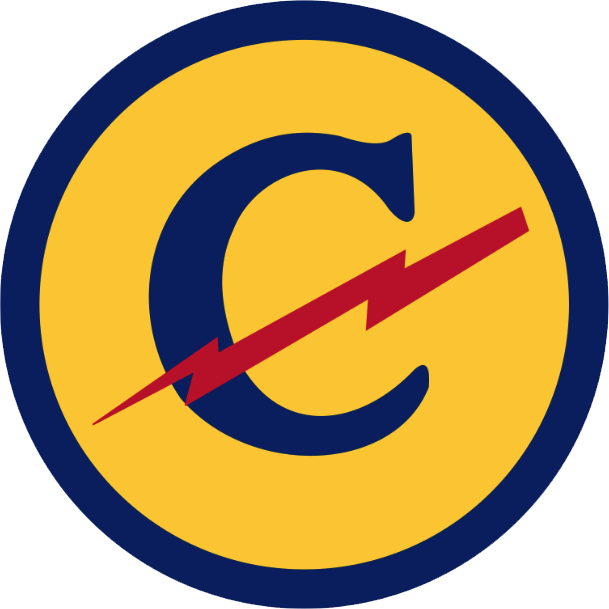
US Constabulary
1946–1952

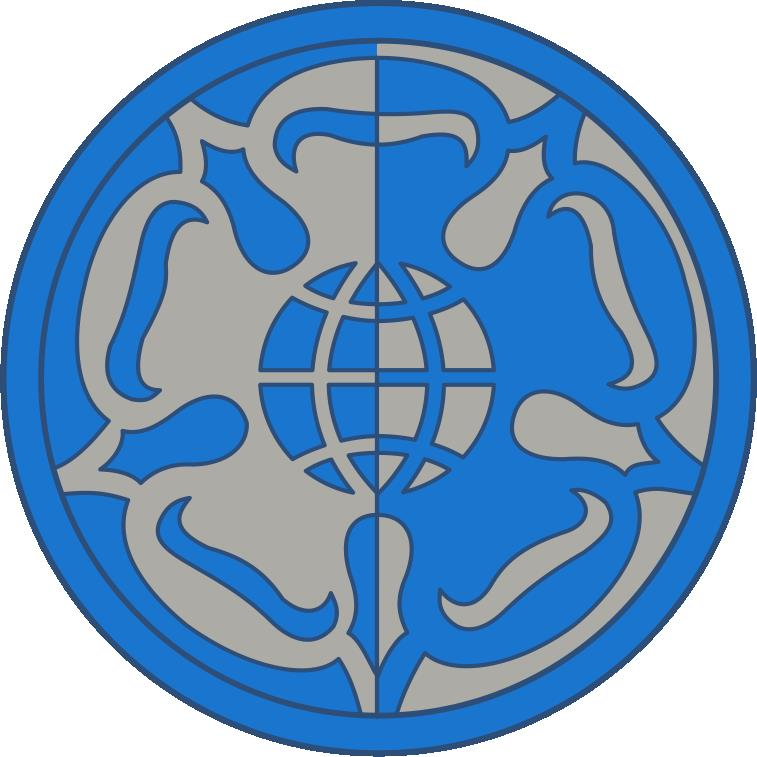
US Army Intelligence Agency
1976–1977

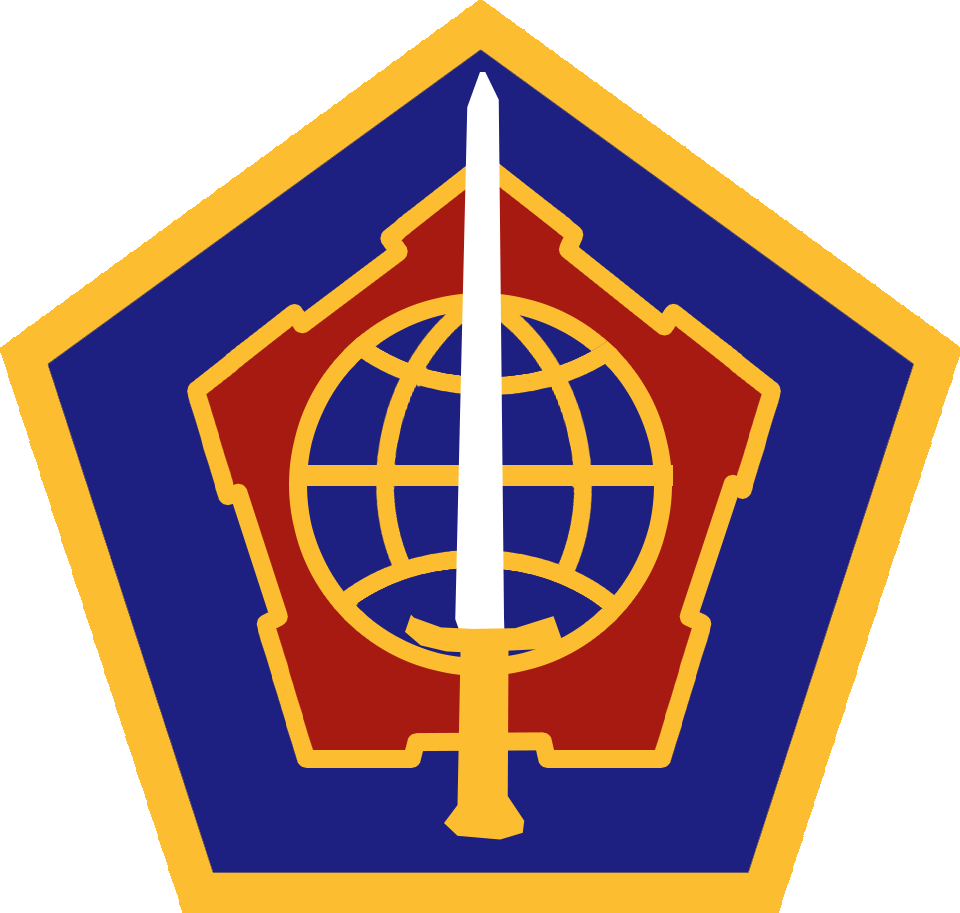
US Army Military Personnel Center

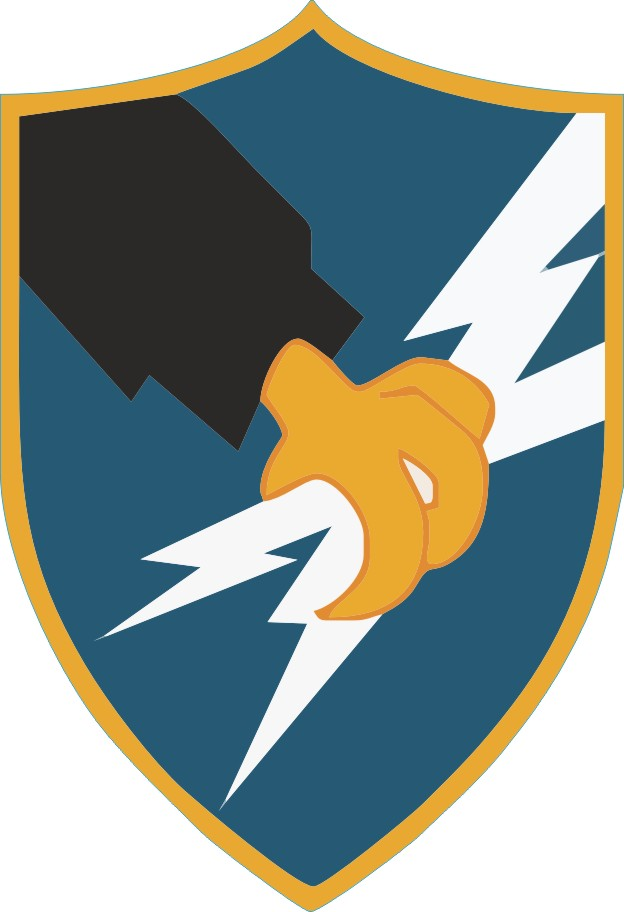
United States Army Security Agency (ASA)
1945–1977

US Army Service Forces
1942–1946

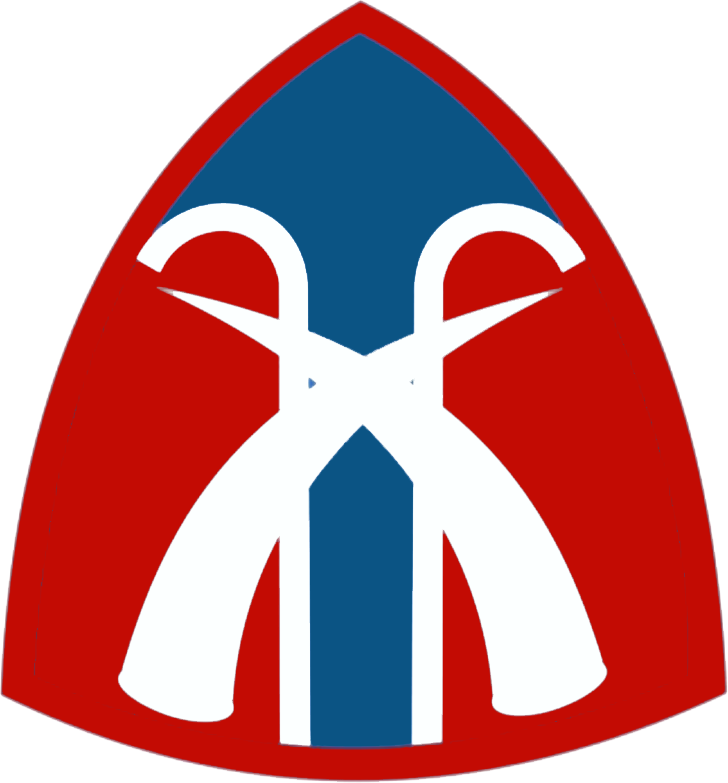
US Army Support Thailand (USARSUPTHAI)

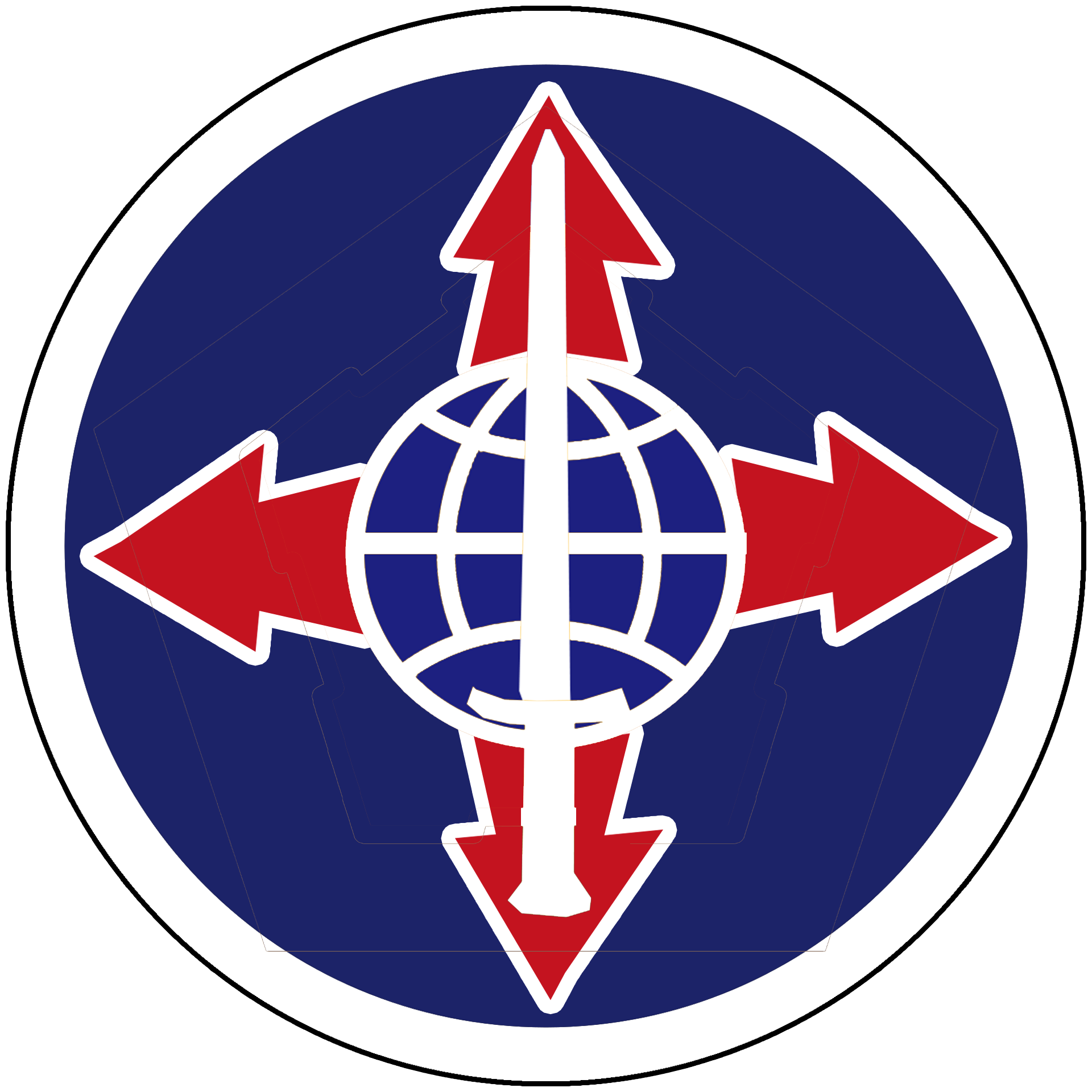
US Army Total Army Personnel Agency

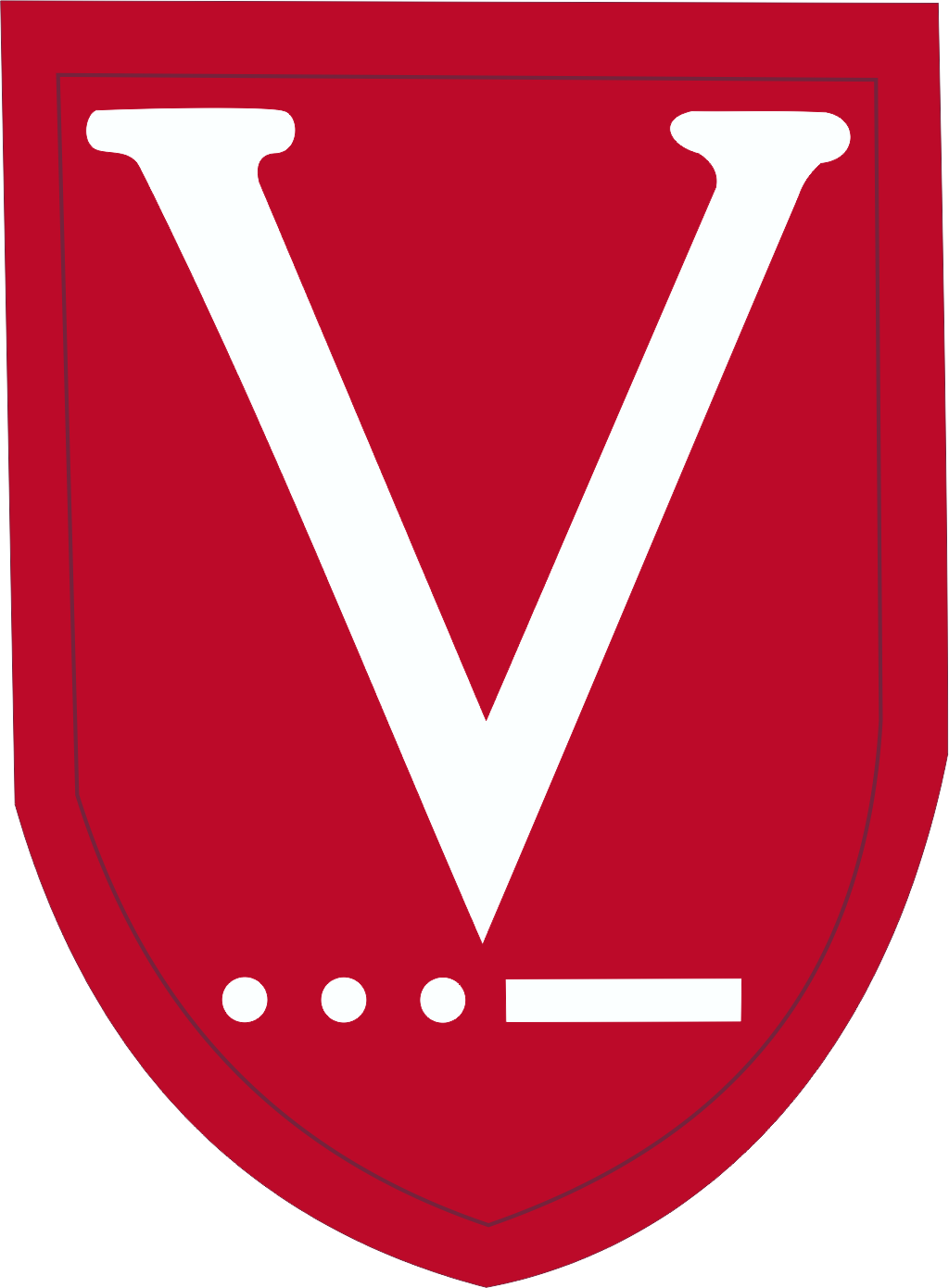
Victory Task Force

Notes:

- One asterisk (*) after a unit's date span (or an insignia's date span—preferred when available) indicates a unit has seen internal deactivations. See the corresponding unit article for more information.
- Two asterisks (**) after a unit's date span indicate the unit has been re-designated (e.g., a command re-designated to a brigade). A re-designation is often accompanied by a considerable reorganization or change to a different unit size.

== See also ==
- Field army insignia of the United States Army
- Corps insignia of the United States Army
- Division insignia of the United States Army
- Brigade insignia of the United States Army
- Miscellaneous SSI of the United States Army
