= 8th Personnel Command =

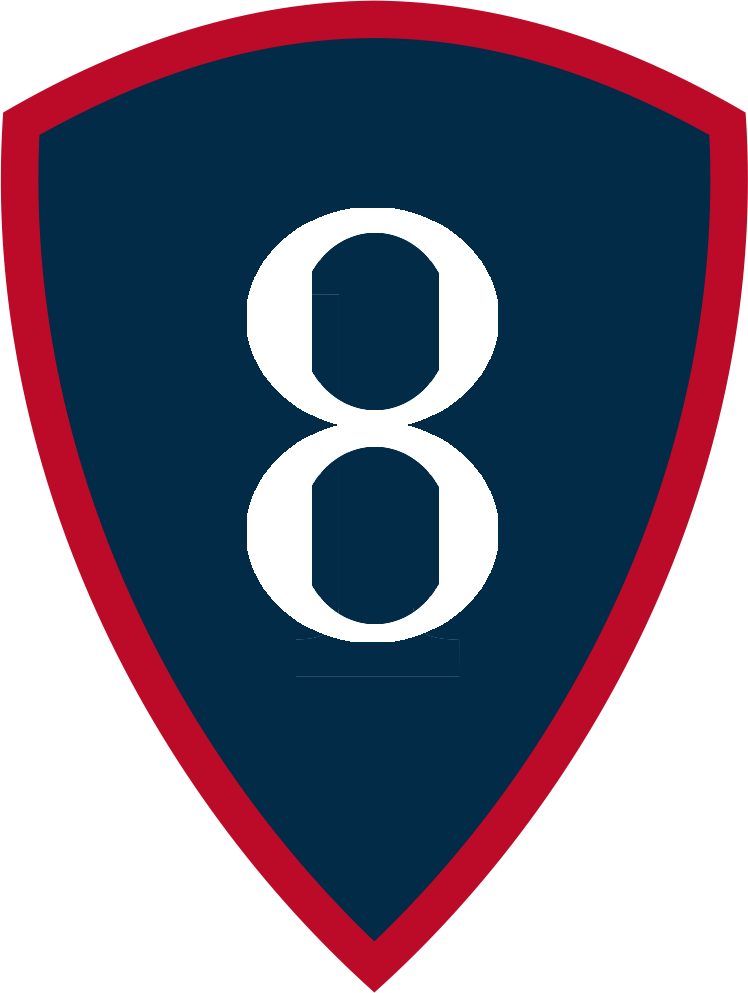
- Active: 1987-2005
- Country: United States
- Branch: United States Army
- Type: Personnel
- Role: Command
- Part of: Eighth Army (United States)
- Garrison/HQ: Yongsan Garrison, South Korea
- Motto: Soldier Service Support

Commanders
- Final Commander: Col. Michael J. Harris

Insignia
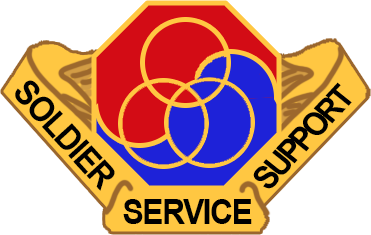
- 8th PERSCOM DUI

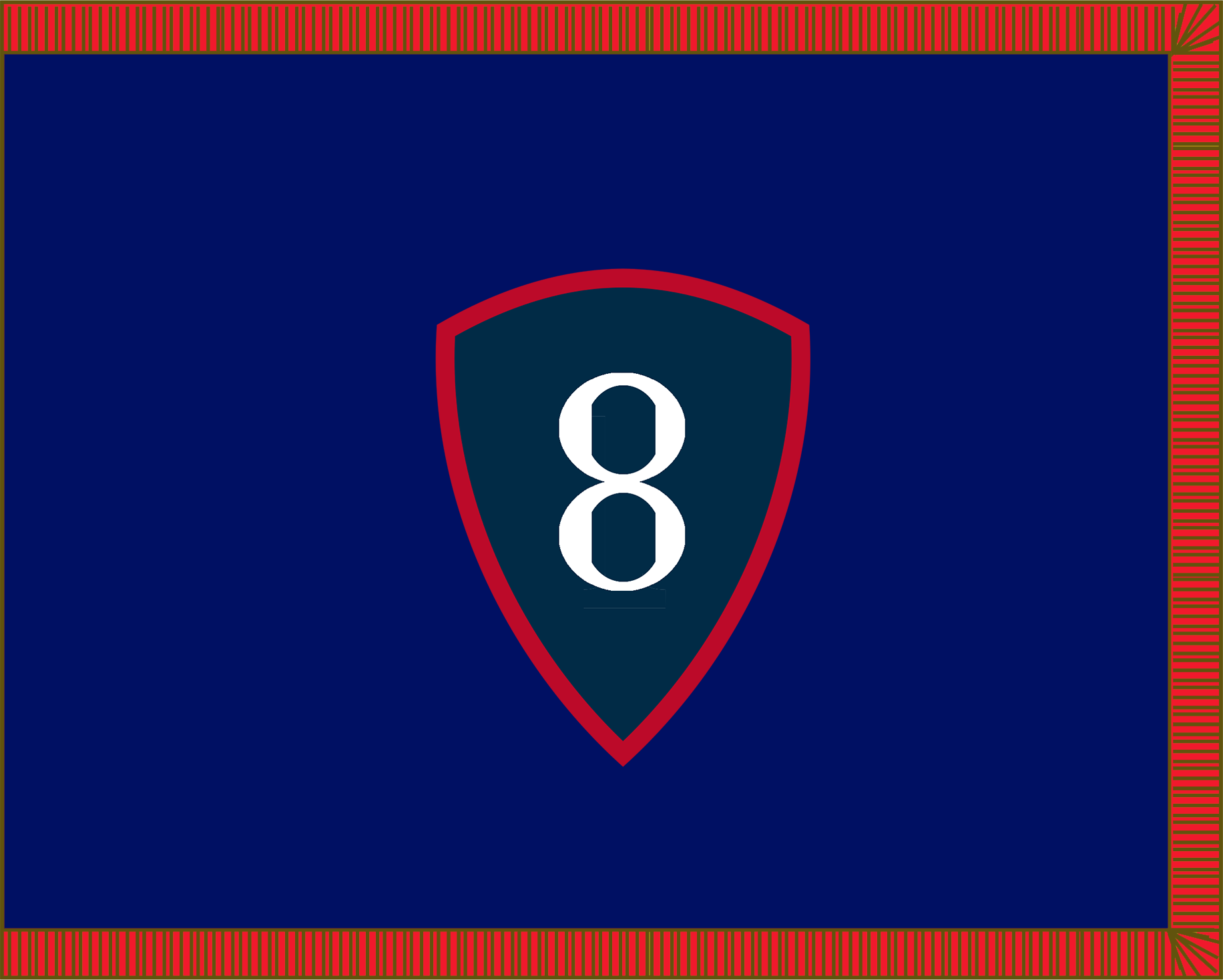
- 8th Personnel Command Flag

The 8th Personnel Command (8th PERSCOM) was a US Army unit activated on 16 October 1987 as part of the US Eighth Army in Yongsan Garrison, South Korea. The unit was a provisional unit from 15 January 1982 until its official activation. The 8th PERSCOM was in charge of personnel replacement, postal operations, administrative services and KATUSA programs. The On 17 June 2005, the unit was redesignated as the 8th Personnel Center and reassigned to Fort Shafter, Hawaii under the 8th Theater Sustainment Command.

== Subordinate Units ==
- 199th Personnel Service Company
- 509th Personnel Service Company
- 516th Personnel Service Company
- 1st Replacement Company - Inchon
- Headquarters Postal Group-Korea
- 1st Adjutant General Detachment (Postal)
- 10th Adjutant General Detachment (Postal) - Camp Red Cloud, Camp Page and Camp Stanley
- 19th Adjutant General Detachment (Postal) - Yongsan and Camp Market
- 66th Adjutant General Detachment (Postal) - US Forces Korea
- 81st Adjutant General Detachment (Postal) - Camp Humphreys, Camp Ames and Camp Long
- 117th Adjutant General Detachment (Postal) - Taegu, Camp Carroll and Pusan

== Insignia ==
The shoulder sleeve insignia (SSI) is a blue Norman shield with a white number eight on it outlined in red.

The distinctive unit insignia (DUI) is an octagon with a red and blue taeguk containing three gold interlocking circles. Below is a scroll with the motto "Soldier Service Support." It was authorized 27 January 1987.

== Commanders ==
- Col. Richard P. Mustion
- Col. Michael J. Harris 2005

== See also ==
- 1st Personnel Command
- 3rd Personnel Command
- 10th Personnel Command
