= Madigan Army Medical Center =

- United States Army Medical Command
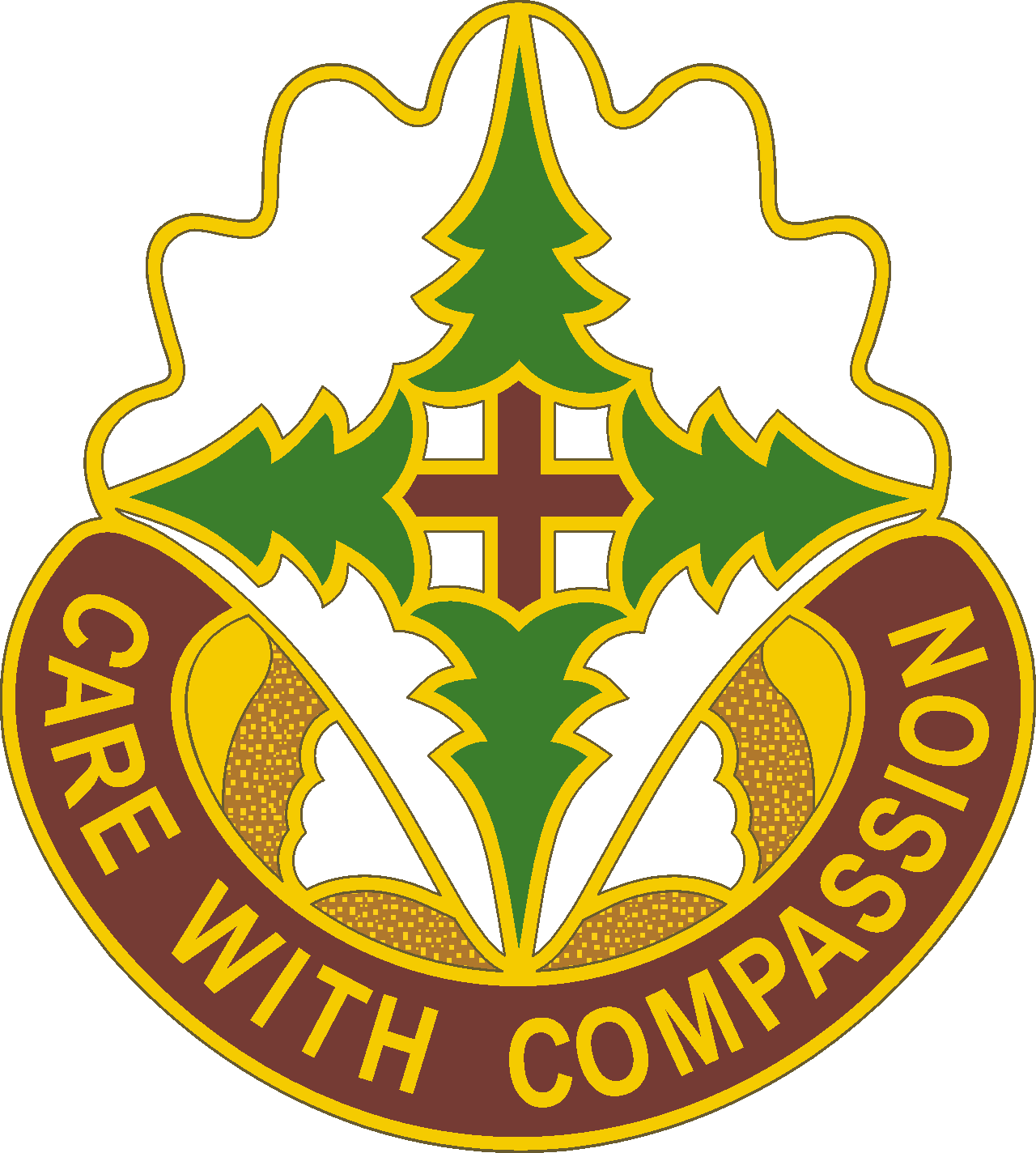

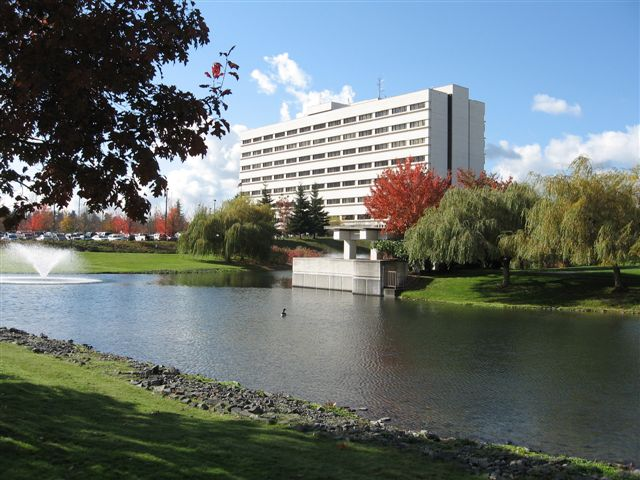
- The hospital in 2007

Geography
- Location: 9040 Jackson Ave, Joint Base Lewis-McChord, Washington, United States
- Coordinates: 47°6′31.5″N 122°33′7.46″W

Organization
- Type: Military hospital

Services
- Emergency department: Level II trauma center
- Beds: 205

History
- Founded: 1944

Links
- Website: www.mamc.health.mil
- Lists: Hospitals in Washington state

Madigan Army Medical Center
- Active: 1944 - present
- Country: United States
- Branch: United States Army
- Type: Hospital
- Garrison/HQ: Joint Base Lewis McChord, Washington
- Motto: "Care With Compassion"

Commanders
- Commanding officer: Colonel Hope M. Williamson-Younce
- Command Sergeant Major: CSM Gilberto Colon

The Madigan Army Medical Center, located on Joint Base Lewis-McChord just outside Lakewood, Washington, is a key component of the Madigan Healthcare System and one of the largest military hospitals on the West Coast of the United States.

The hospital was named in honor of Colonel Patrick Madigan, an assistant to the U.S. Army Surgeon General from 1940 to 1943 who was also known as "The Father of Army Neuropsychiatry." On September 22, 1944, Madigan General Hospital was named in his honor.

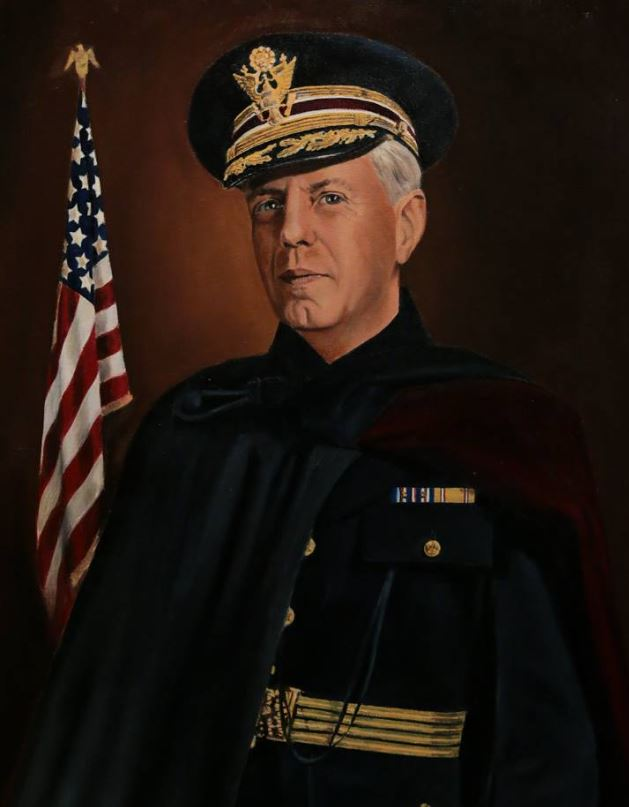
Colonel Patrick Madigan, the hospital's namesake.

The hospital today is a 205-bed, Joint Commission-accredited facility, expandable to 318 beds in the event of a disaster. Major services include general medical and surgical care, adult and pediatric primary care clinics, 24-hour Emergency department, specialty clinics, clinical services, wellness and prevention services, veterinary care, and environmental health services.

Madigan Army Medical Center received designation as a level 2 trauma center by the Washington State Department of Health in 1995, and has maintained level 2 status to the present day. The Madigan Army Medical Center is one of three designated trauma centers in the United States Army Medical Department (AMEDD). In 1999, Madigan became the second military hospital to ever receive a perfect score of "100" from the Joint Commission.

Construction of the current facility was completed in the early 1990s. Prior to the opening of the building, the hospital consisted of a network of connected single-story buildings that are still utilized by Madigan Army Medical Center.

== Deployment and readiness medicine ==
Madigan Army Medical Center and other Madigan Healthcare System facilities provide medical support to the Army and Air Force units of Joint Base Lewis-McChord at home and abroad.

Madigan's Professional Filler System (PROFIS) Program is only for medical Soldiers, and mostly affects doctors and commissioned nurses. The system designates qualified active Army AMEDD personnel working in non-deployable units like Madigan, and directs them to fill a unit activated to deploy. The tour length is different for every PROFIS Soldier, with most doctors and nurses going overseas for six months to a year.

After criticism from the animal rights organization, PETA, the Madigan Army Medical Center announced in 2013 that it would no longer use ferrets in pediatric intubation exercises.

== Graduate Medical Education ==
Graduate Medical Education (GME) training programs at Madigan Army Medical Center are offered only to military officers in the Armed Forces. This institution does not participate in the National Resident Matching Program. The Graduate Medical Education (GME) office oversees the training of 35 intern, resident and fellowship programs in addition to being a rotation site for the Uniformed Services University (USU), Health Professional Scholarship Programs (HPSP) and various medical universities around the nation. In addition, the GME office verifies graduate medical education training from Madigan Army Medical Center, Silas B. Hays Army Community Hospital and Letterman Army Medical Center.

== The JBLM Center for Autism Resources, Education and Services (CARES) ==
The Joint Base Lewis–McChord (JBLM) Center for Autism Resources, Education and Services (CARES) is a joint installation partnership between Madigan Army Medical Center and the JBLM Armed Forces Community Service which focuses on providing patient-centered care for military children with autism and their families. The facility was officially opened in a live ribbon cutting hosted by then Madigan commander, Col. Michael Place, Congressman Denny Heck, Representative (D-WA 10th District) and I corps commanding general Lt. Gen Gary J Volesky. JBLM CARES offers occupational, physical and speech therapy, Applied behavior analysis or ABA, Exceptional Family Member Program (EFMP) Systems Navigation, CYSS Respite Care and more. While the priority mission of JBLM CARES is to provide transitional autism support treatment and services for patients who are on waitlists at off-base community providers, pediatric patients with other special needs may be eligible for certain services provided at CARES.

== Intrepid Spirit Center - Traumatic Brain Injury and PTSD interdisciplinary care ==
After two years of construction, the Intrepid Spirit Center officially opened its doors on Joint Base Lewis-McChord on April 5, 2018. The $12 million center specializes in treating service members with traumatic brain injuries and related conditions such as post-traumatic stress disorder (PTSD) and chronic pain. It is the 6th Intrepid Spirit Center to open nationally, thanks to a partnership between the U.S. Army and the Intrepid Fallen Heroes Fund. Intrepid Spirit Program's mission is to provide the holistic interdisciplinary care and resources supporting readiness, resilience and recovery for our patients throughout the Pacific region with complex conditions following trauma such as history of concussion, post-traumatic stress, chronic pain, and the presence of two or more associated chronic diseases or conditions in a patient which have not been resolved despite receiving treatment through existing collaborative models of care.

=== Program overviews ===
==== Traumatic Brain Injury Program ====
The Madigan Traumatic Brain Injury Program consists of an interdisciplinary team who work to prevent, identify and mitigate the effects of head and brain trauma and the presence of two or more associated chronic diseases or conditions in a patient. The center utilizes Army Medicine's Performance Triad (sleep, activity and nutrition) to optimize brain health and alignment with the Defense and Veterans Brain Injury Center guidelines of clinical care.

==== Intrepid Spirit Program ====
The Madigan Intrepid Spirit Program serves as an extension of the current holistic traumatic brain injury (TBI), behavioral health and Intensive Pain Management Center programs offered at Madigan and to follow the National Intrepid Center of Excellence model of team based interdisciplinary care. Intrepid Spirit Program provides comprehensive specialty evaluations under one roof. Madigan Intrepid Spirit Transitions (MIST) intensive outpatient program involves full days of holistic state-of-the-art treatment and educational programs with opportunities supporting readiness, life skills techniques and a variety of tools and resources for continued healing and growth beyond the six-week program.

==== Clinical programs ====
- The Traumatic Brain Injury Program
- The Intrepid Spirit Program Specialty Evaluations & Care
- The Madigan Intrepid Spirit Transitions (MIST) Intensive Outpatient Program (IOP)
- The Mindfulness Based Stress Reduction (MBSR) Program

==== MIST IOP ====
Madigan's Intrepid Spirit is tasked to provide evidence-based interdisciplinary assessment and intensive outpatient care for Service Members with complex medical conditions with the goal of fostering optimal outcomes through the establishment of a new care model including enhanced case management, an arena intake, and intensive outpatient rehabilitation. The 5-week program gives service members tools to assist them with chronic pain, behavior health issues, headaches, and other co-morbidities associated with head trauma.

=== Categories of patients treated at Intrepid Spirit Center ===
- TBI: All service members, retirees and families
- Intrepid Spirit Program Specialty evaluations & care: All service members, retirees and families
- Madigan Intrepid Spirit Transitions (MIST) Intensive Outpatient Program (IOP): Limited to active duty service members only
- MBSR: All service members, retirees and families

=== Research ===
Significant advances in clinical research on TBI and PTSD has resulted in effective and innovative evidence-based treatments, many of which have already been implemented at Madigan's Intrepid Spirit Center. Madigan's Intrepid Spirit Center is now one of 22 Defense and Veterans Brain Injury Center sites where a collaborative integration of state-of-the-science treatment with timely and innovative clinical research is intended.

== Major General William H. Gourley Outpatient Clinic, First joint DoD/VA clinic ==
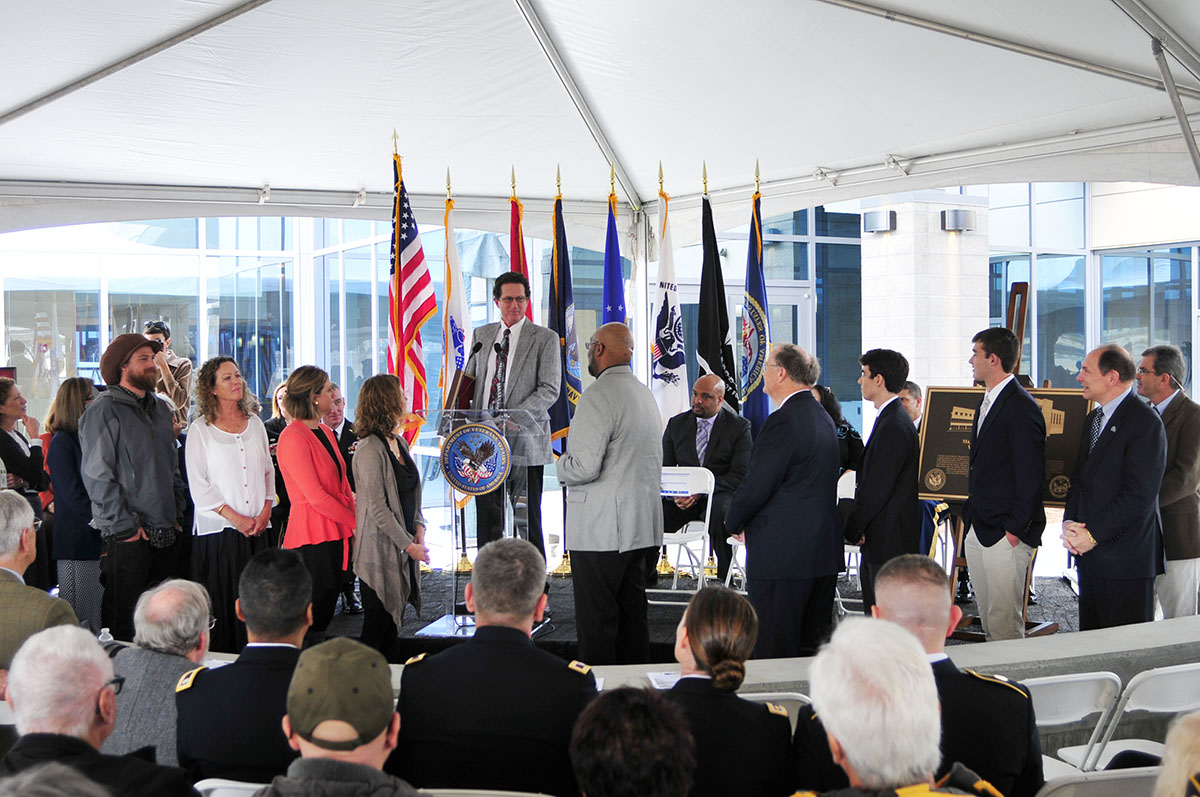
Maj. Gen. Gourley VA Clinic Dedication Ceremony

Major General William H. Gourley VA-DoD Outpatient Clinic opened in June 2017. The Gourley Clinic serves Veterans, Active Duty Service Members and Families. The clinic replaced existing and outdated Veterans Administration and Department of Defense clinics to provide comprehensive healthcare services to patients in a modern space with improved efficiencies and expanded resources. The three-story, 146,000-gross-square-foot facility provides care for approximately 80,000 military Veterans living on California's Central Coast. The new facility provides primary care and specialty care including medical/surgical subspecialty clinics, mental health care, audiology, physical and occupational therapy, ancillary and diagnostic service. The clinic replaced the VA Palo Alto Health Care System's existing clinic to meet the growing healthcare need for Veterans in the region. It is only the second fully integrated VA/DoD facility in the nation.

== Amtrak Train Derailment Response ==
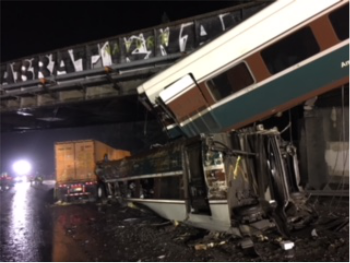
Wreckage of Amtrak Derailment near Dupont, Wa

On the morning of December 18, 2017, Amtrak Cascades passenger train 501 derailed near DuPont, Washington, United States. It was the inaugural run on the Point Defiance Bypass, a new passenger rail route south of Tacoma, Washington. Army medical personnel, commuting to and from work, were among the first on the scene to begin saving passengers in the immediate aftermath of the crash. Tanya Porter, a nurse at Madigan Army Medical Center, was given the Secretary of the Army Award for Valor by Army Secretary Mark Esper for her brave efforts in saving train crash victims. Second Lt. Robert McCoy, who was assigned to the 56th Multifunctional Medical Battalion was at the site of the accident " I grabbed tourniquets I had in my truck and approached the scene." Second Lt. McCoy, Lt. Col. Christopher Sloan, and Maj. Mike Livingston, Madigan Army Medical Center staff and Army service members, were also on the scene assisting victims of the crash. At 8:12 a.m. Madigan's emergency room accepted and began treating the first of 19 patients from the Amtrak train derailment

== 2012 Allegations of war stress treatment issues ==
The center was under investigation because of allegations that the center's staff downgraded diagnoses of post-traumatic stress disorder for 300 service members to lesser conditions. The center's chief, Colonel Dallas Homas, and mental health chief, William Keppler, were placed on administrative leave during the inquiry. Dr. William Keppler, then the leader of the Madigan screening team, reportedly during a presentation, said a PTSD diagnosis could cost as much as $1.5 million over the lifetime of a soldier, and he urged staff to be good stewards of taxpayer dollars. One forensic team member, Dr. Juliana Ellis-Billingsley, quit in February, and in a letter of resignation blasted the Madigan investigations as a charade.

In the wake of Pentagon and Congressional scrutiny the Army reluctantly released a 100-page report, dated April 1, 2012 that backed then Madigan commander, Col. Dallas Homas, and supports the manner in which the hospital carried out forensic psychiatric evaluations before accusations of reversing PTSD diagnoses. The report found that Col. Homas did not exert any undue influence over PTSD diagnoses, and that he acted appropriately enforcing standard medical guidelines.

Military support groups around the base have alleged that base commanders did not give returning troops sufficient time to recover before sending them on more deployments. The groups have also alleged that the base's medical staff is understaffed and overwhelmed by the numbers of returning veterans with deployment-related medical and psychological trauma. Since 2003, 68 servicemembers stationed at the base have committed suicide, with 16 taking their own lives in 2011. Other US Army bases, however, such as Fort Hood, Fort Campbell and Fort Bragg, have experienced higher rates of suicide and similar crime rates.

=== Increasing access to behavioral health programs ===
In an effort to improve readiness and make behavior health even more accessible to service members, in 2011 Madigan began utilizing embedded behavioral health teams. Madigan's Department of Behavioral Health now has the largest number of behavioral health providers in the Army and offers comprehensive behavioral health services to all TRICARE eligible beneficiaries such as:

- Inpatient and Outpatient psychiatric care
- Evaluation and management of psychotropic medications
- Individual, group and family psychotherapy
- Diagnostic evaluation and psychological testing
- Child and adolescent care
- Addiction treatment programs
- Family crisis emergencies

==== Addiction Medicine Treatment Facility ====
The Addiction Medicine Residential Treatment Facility (AMRTF) is 12-bed unit that provides 28 days of inpatient residential drug and alcohol substance abuse recovery to active duty Service Members struggling with addiction, has been shutdown since 2019. The AMRTF admits Service Members from the west coast of the U.S., Hawaii, Korea, and Japan. When availability allows, the AMRTF will accept Service Members from anywhere in the world.
