= Flight 296 =

Flight 296 may refer to:

- Sterling Airways Flight 296, crashed on 14 March 1972
- CAAC Flight 296 crashed on May 5, 1983
- Air France Flight 296Q, crashed on 26 June 1988
