= Thomas F. Sikora =

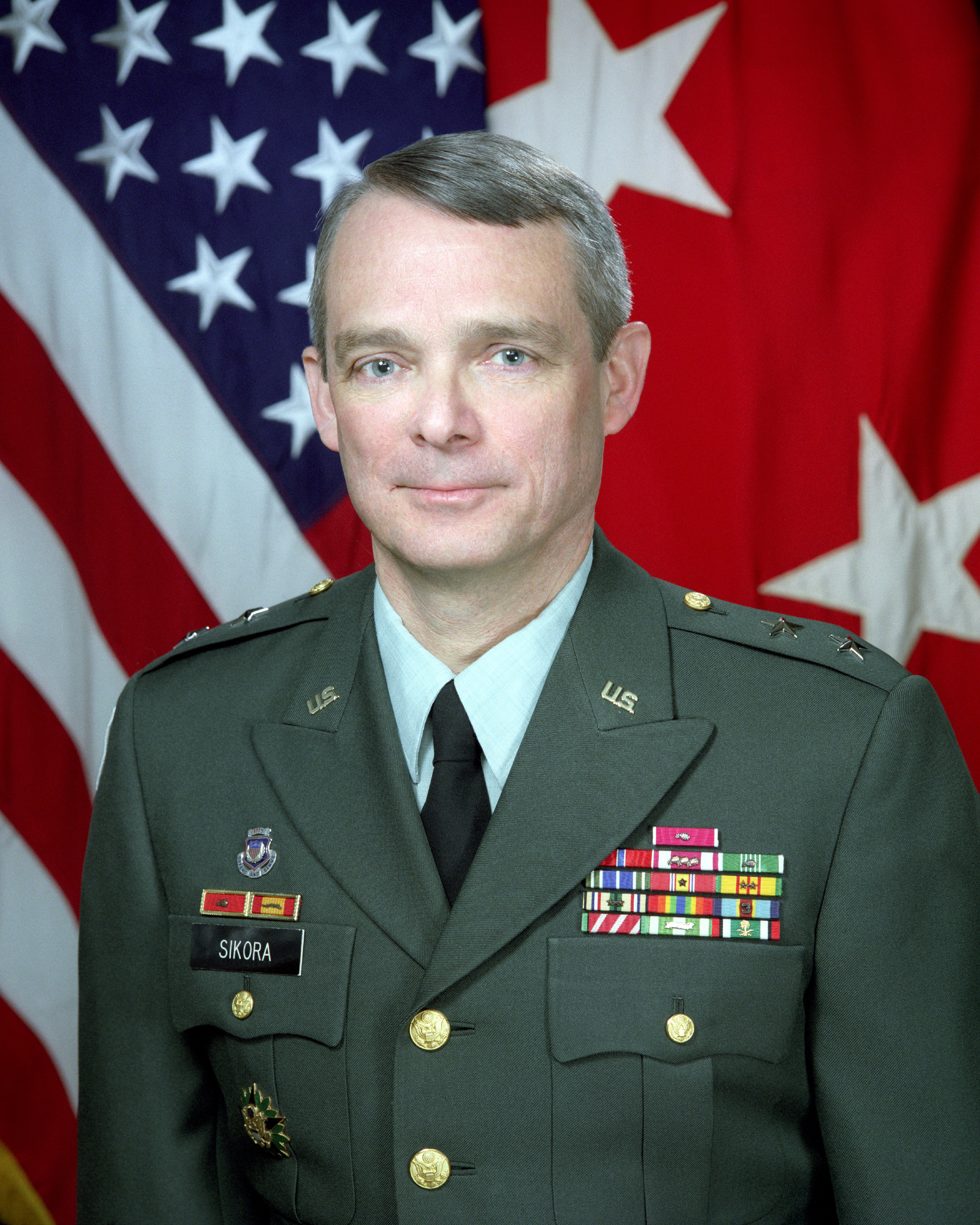
Portrait of U.S. Army Maj. Gen. Thomas F. Sikora

Thomas F. Sikora was a United States Army officer of the Adjutant General's corps who retired as a Major General.

From 1990 to 1991, Brigadier General Sikora was the Adjutant General of the United States Army.

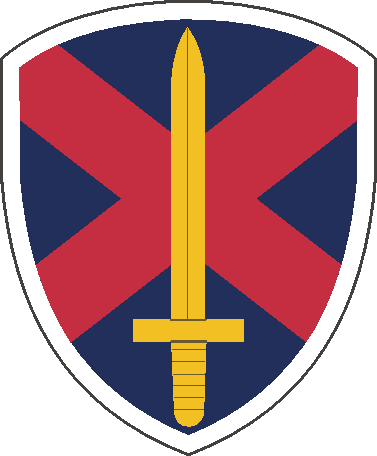
10th Personnel Command SSI

As a Brigadier General, Sikora was the commanding general of 10th Personnel Command (10th PERSCOM) during Operation Desert Shield / Operation Desert Storm. The unit did not exist prior to the Gulf War. The 10th PERSCOM became the largest unit deployed in support of ground troops, supporting over 300,000 soldiers.

After the Gulf War, Sikora was promoted to Major General in 1992 and made Deputy Chief of Staff for Personnel Management (DCSPER), U.S. Army Europe. He was later the U.S. Army G1, Director of Military Personnel Management.

== See also ==
- 1st Personnel Command
- 3rd Personnel Command
- 8th Personnel Command
- List of Adjutant Generals of the U.S. Army
