= 3rd Personnel Command =

3d Personnel Command
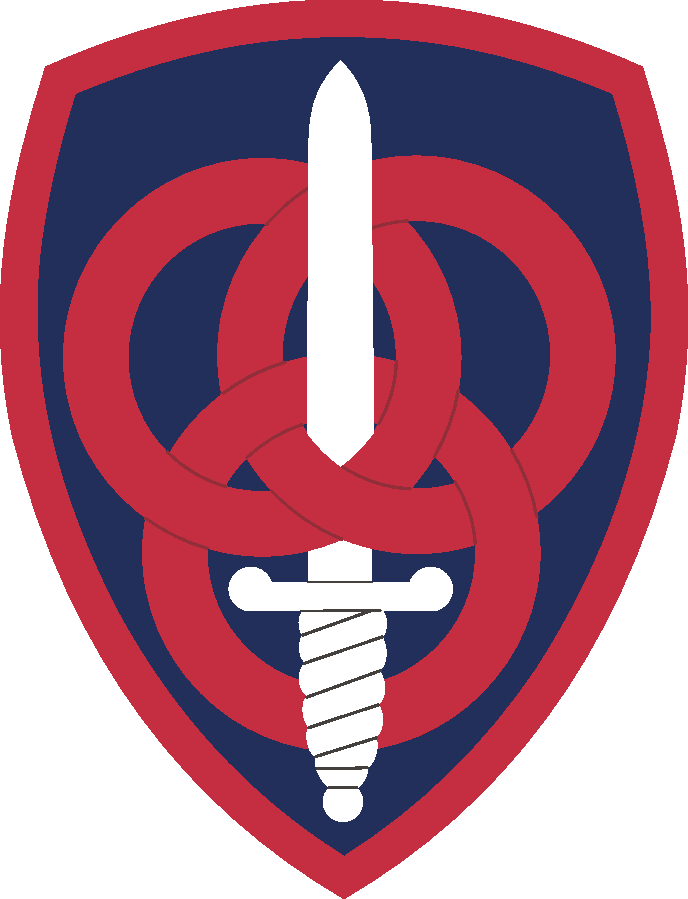
- Active: 1991-2008; 2008-present as 3rd HRSC
- Country: United States
- Branch: United States Army
- Type: Command
- Role: Personnel
- Part of: United States Central Command
- Garrison/HQ: Jackson, Miss.
- Motto: Supporting the Warriors

Insignia
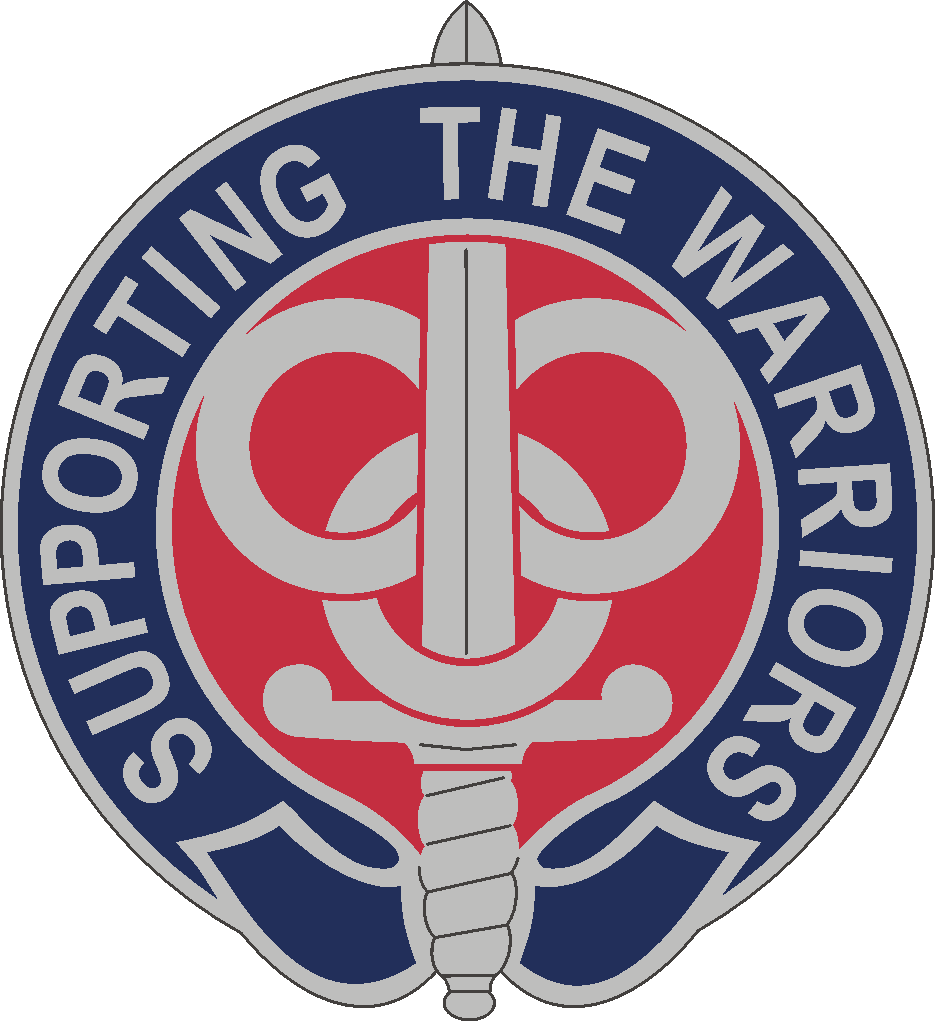
- 3rd Personnel Command DUI

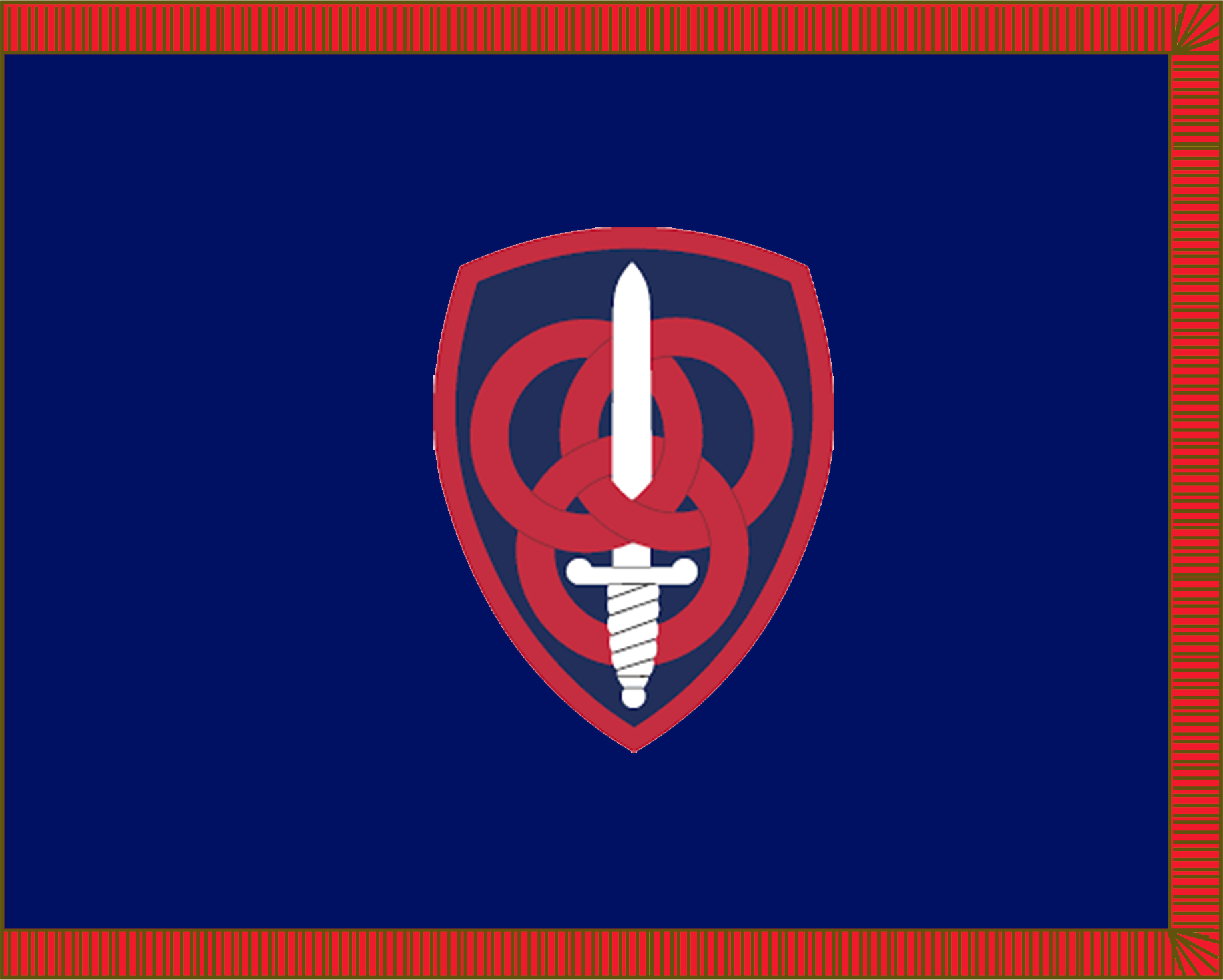
- 3rd Personnel Command Flag

The 3d Personnel Command (3d PERSCOM) was activated on 16 September 1991 in Jackson, Mississippi as a part of Central Command (CENTCOM) to deploy personnel to forward bases such as Camp Doha, Kuwait. In 2003, the 3rd PERSCOM had taken over all postal operations in CENTCOM until 2004. By 2008, 3d PERSCOM had become the 3rd Human Resources Sustainment Center (3d HRSC) as the United States was ending Operation Enduring Freedom and now are a part of the 1st Theater Sustainment Command.

== Subordinate Units (during Operation Enduring Freedom) ==
- HHC, 3rd PERSCOM - Jackson, Miss.
- 3rd PERSCOM (FWD) - Camp Doha, Kuwait
- 310th Personnel Group - Fort Jackson, S.C.
- 324th Replacement Bn -
- 360th Replacement Bn - Myrtle Beach, S.C.
- 461st Personnel Services Co - Decatur, Ga.
- 678th Personnel Services Co - Nashville, Tenn.

== Commanders ==
- BG Sean J. Byrne
- Col. Donald Kennedy - c. 2003
- Col. Roberta Flath - c. 2007
- Col. Cheryl Ludwa - c. 2008

== See also ==
- 1st Personnel Command
- 8th Personnel Command
- 10th Personnel Command
