= MV LTC John U.D. Page =

LTC John U.D. Page-class dry cargo ship

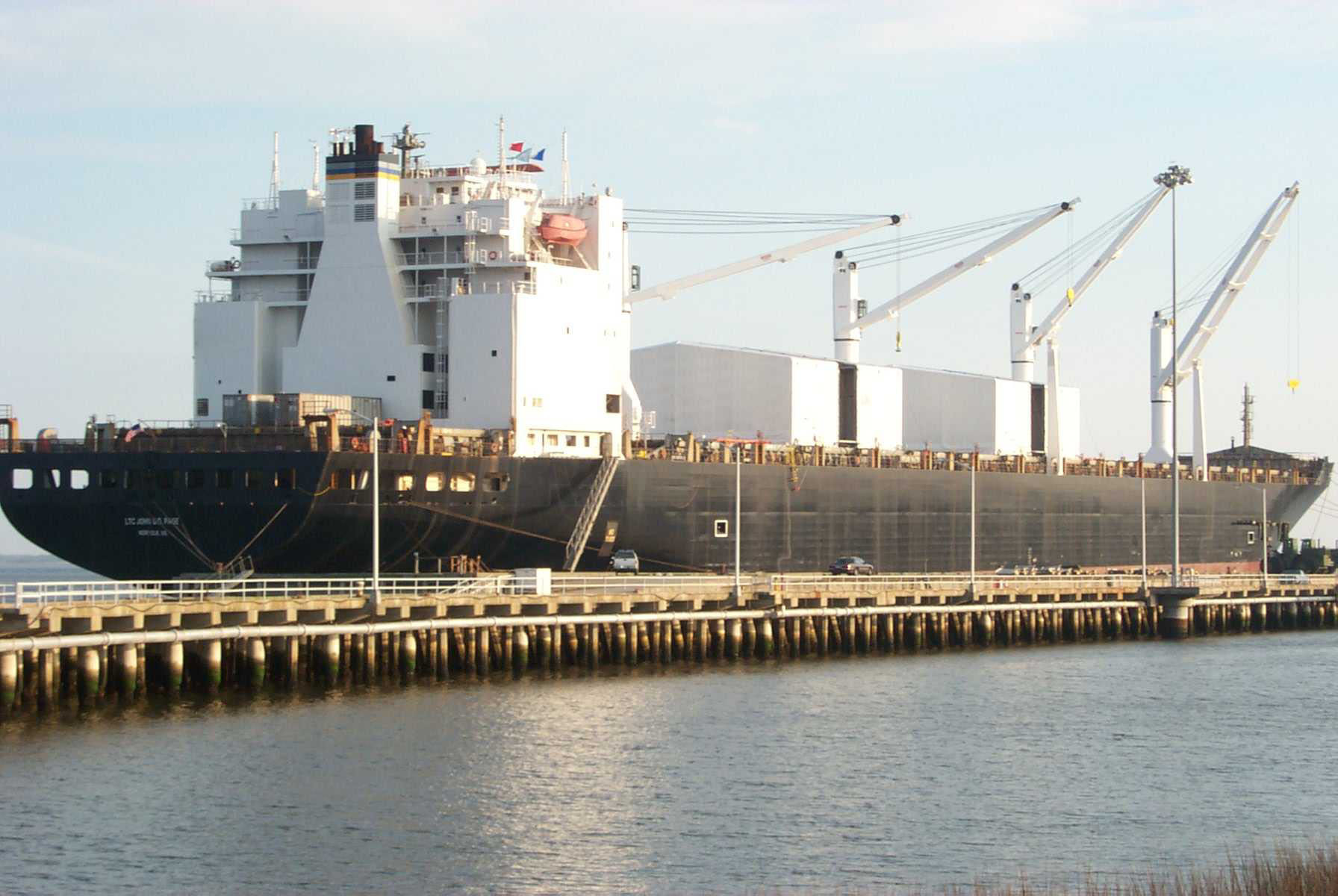
- MV LTC John U.D. Page

History

United States
- Name: LTC John U.D. Page
- Namesake: John U. D. Page
- Owner: United States Lines (1985-1988); Sea-Land Service (1988–2000); Maersk Line (2000-2010s)
- Builder: Daewoo Shipbuilding
- Yard number: 4011
- Completed: 1985
- Renamed: American Utah (1985-1986); Irene D (1986-1988); Utah (1988); Newark Bay (1988-2001)
- Identification: IMO number: 8212714; MMSI number: 367040000; Callsign: WAAD; Hull number: AK-4496
- Fate: Scrapped, 2015

General characteristics
- Class & type: LTC John U.D. Page-class cargo ship
- Displacement: 74,500 t (73,323 long tons), full
- Length: 949 ft 8 in (289.46 m)
- Beam: 105 ft 9 in (32.23 m)
- Draft: 35 ft 0 in (10.67 m)
- Propulsion: 1 × Sulzer 7-cyl. diesel engine
- Speed: 18 knots (33 km/h; 21 mph)
- Capacity: 4,614 TEU
- Complement: 21 mariners
- Aviation facilities: Helipad

USNS LTC John U.D. Page (AK-4496), was the lead ship of the LTC John U.D. Page-class cargo ship built in 1985. The ship is named after Lieutenant Colonel John U. D. Page, an American soldier who was awarded the Medal of Honor during Korean War.

== Construction and commissioning ==
The ship was built in 1985 at the Daewoo Shipyard, Koje, Yeongnam. She was put into the service of United States Lines as American Utah and Irene D from 1985 until the company's bankruptcy in 1986.

Sea-Land Service later acquired the ship in 1988 and put in service as Utah and Newark Bay until 2000.

In October 2000, the ship was chartered by the Maersk Line for the Military Sealift Command and was put into the Prepositioning Program and the Maritime Prepositioning Ship Squadron 2 as MV LTC John U.D. Page (AK-4496) on 1 March 2001.

In 2015, the ship left for scrap in Rotterdam, Netherlands by Sea2Cradlen and the recycling process was completed by 2016.
