= Mary Willis (US Army officer) =

First female US Army Officer administrator at West Point

Mary Catherine Willis
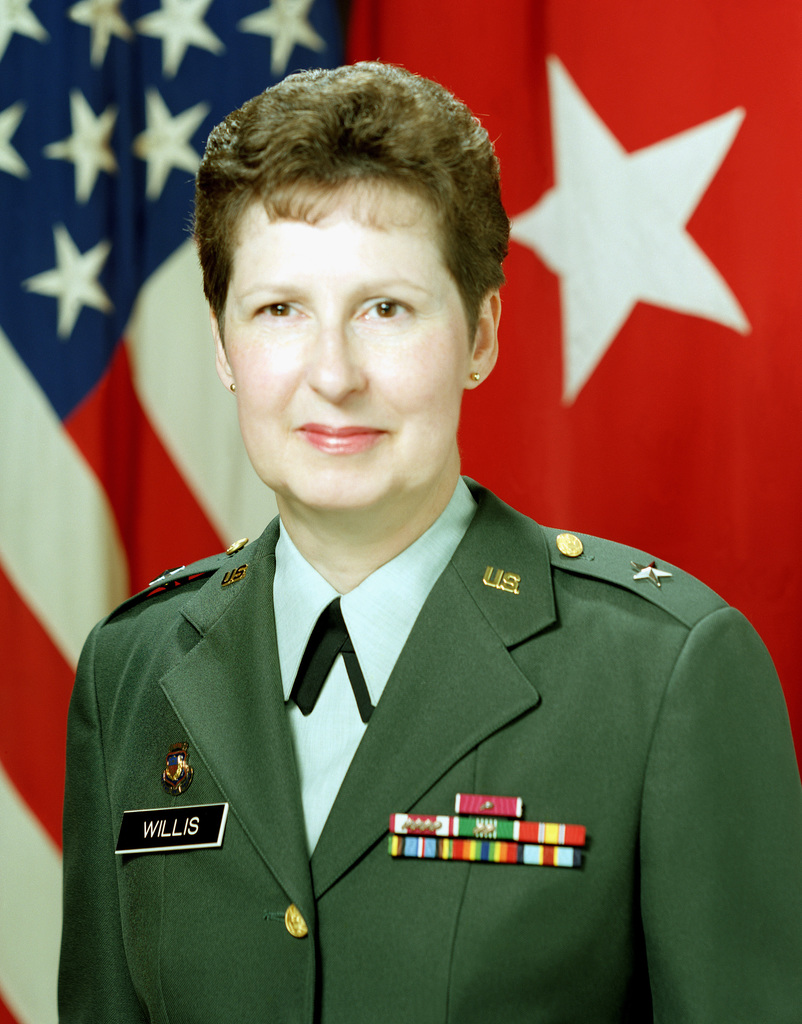
- Born: January 31, 1940 (age 86); Baltimore, Maryland, U.S.
- Education: Salisbury University; Shippensburg University
- Military career
- Allegiance: United States
- Branch: United States Army
- Service years: 1963–1993
- Rank: Brigadier general

Mary Catherine Willis (born January 31, 1940) is a retired US Army brigadier general.

The first female US Army Officer administrator at West Point, Willis was instrumental in the integration of women cadets at West Point in Summer 1976, overseeing three classes from 1976 to 1979. She has also been an advocate in the integration and fair treatment of women across all ranks of the US Army.

A native of Maryland, Willis joined the Army in 1963 and served in Virginia, Korea, Chicago, and Alabama before West Point, followed by two assignments in Germany and one at the Pentagon until her military retirement in 1993. She has subsequently worked in Washington, D.C., and for her alma mater in Maryland's Eastern Shore.

== Early life ==
Willis was born on January 31, 1940, in Baltimore, Maryland, At age eight, Willis and her family moved to Harford County, Maryland. At age 13, Willis and her family moved to Salisbury, Maryland, in Maryland's Eastern Shore.

In 1957, Willis graduated from Wicomico High School. In 1959, she graduated from St. Mary's Seminary College. In May 1962, Willis graduated from Salisbury State Teacher's College (now Salisbury University). Willis became a 2nd grade teacher for the Wicomico County Public Schools, at North Salisbury Elementary School.

Her older brother joined the US Army after graduating from high school in 1955.

Years later, Willis earned a master's degree from Shippensburg University.

== Military career ==
In Summer 1963, Willis applied to various branches of the US military as a commissioned officer. In September 1963, Willis joined the US Army on active duty.

After completing a five-month officer basic course at Fort McClellan, Alabama in Anniston, Alabama, Willis stayed at the WAC training center and led enlisted women through basic training. She was later assigned to Fort Myer, Virginia, where she served as a junior supply and training officer at a WAC company of 350 women.

=== Assignment in Korea ===
Despite wanting an assignment in Vietnam, Willis was assigned to Korea in January 1966 where she was assigned outside Seoul, Korea to the 20th General Support group in Incheon for 14 months.

During her assignment there, a married, older Korean district police chief became enamored with Willis. Despite Willis’ disinterest, the police chief continued to pursue her romantically. When she realized that her boss, a lieutenant colonel, worked very closely with the chief, Willis asked her boss to inform the chief of her disinterest. Her boss responded, "When in Rome, do as the Romans do." Appalled, she discovered that her boss, a married man himself, was engaged in an affair with a Korean woman. The boss also required all of his male officer direct reports to date Korean women each weekend. If they refused, the boss would make their lives difficult. On Willis’ officer-evaluation report, her boss wrote that Willis needed more training before she could be assigned to an overseas assignment again. Though she considered redress to a higher authority, Willis learned that the overall commander of her operation was engaged in similar activities.

After her assignment in Korea, the US Army sent Willis to Chicago, Illinois, where she worked as a recruiter for the US Army Recruiting Command for the next 20 months. From December 1967 to December 1968, Willis recruited women college graduates from midwestern colleges and Universities to join the US Army. She lived in Chicago during the civil unrest after the assassination of Dr. Martin Luther King Jr. on April 4, 1968, and the assassination of Robert Kennedy in June 1968 at the Democratic National Convention in Chicago. Her mother lived with Willis in Chicago and other assignments until dying in 1998.

Willis worked at the Office of Personnel Operations until July 1973. In July 1973, The US Army selected Willis to attend United States Army Command and General Staff College at Fort Leavenworth, Kansas, for one year.

After graduating in June 1974, Willis was assigned to Fort McClellan, Alabama, where she served as a battalion executive officer for 18 months.

=== Assignment at West Point ===
In January 1976, the US Army assigned Willis to West Point where she served as an advisor to Superintendent Andrew Goodpaster to help West Point integrate women as cadets. In Summer 1976, West Point admitted its first women for the Class of 1980. Willis remained at West Point until Summer 1979 and helped integrate three classes of women during her tenure there.

=== Assignments in Europe ===
Between 1979 and 1981, Willis served two assignments in Europe. Now a lieutenant colonel, Willis commanded a personnel and administration battalion located in Kaiserslautern with satellite offices in Manheim, Heidelberg, and Pirmasens, Frankfurt, and Bremerhaven. Her subordinates operated from the French border to the Danish border.

Prior to serving in Europe, Willis graduated from a six-week lit course at the Defense Language Institute at Monterey, California, where she studied German.

After her battalion command, Willis attended Army War College, a year-long, highly selective process that accepted only 245 officers a year. Willis was the only woman in her class.

On September 30, 1988, Willis was recommended for promotion to brigadier general.

From 1989 to 1991, Willis was assigned in Germany during the fall of the Berlin Wall and the Soviet Union. She commanded the 1st Personnel Command, two steps from the battalion. Her command ran the military jail in Europe, the postal system, and all the casualty reporting. She also served as the US Army's liaison with the mayors in the suburbs surrounding Heidelberg, Germany. She developed a close friendship with the mayor of Schwetzingen and his wife. In March 1990, Willis attended general officer orientation in Berlin.

=== Work with Joint Chiefs of Staff and Colin Powell ===
After finishing her assignment as the Personnel commander, Willis was assigned to the Pentagon to the Joint Staff as a J1 ("Joint" and "1" "personnel") where she coordinated and developed consensus between the US Army, US Air Force, US Navy, and the US Marine Corps on various personnel policies. There, Willis worked for Joint Chief of Staff Colin Powell.

Willis and Powell would retire from the US military on the same day.

== Post-military ==
After her retirement from the US military, Willis worked at the National Guard Association in Washington, D.C., After living in Alexandria, Virginia, Willis moved back to Maryland's Eastern Shore in 1995, working at Salisbury State University. She also received a Doctor of Humane Letters degree from the university that year.

== Awards and commendations ==
Willis was awarded often as a military officer and received several of her medals and ribbons multiple times.

- Army Service Ribbon
- Far East Medal
- National Defense Service Medal
- Army Commendation Medal – 3 times
- Meritorious Service Medal – 5 times
- Overseas Service Ribbon – 3 times
- Defense Distinguished Service Medal
