= Camp Long =

U.S. army camp in Wonju, South Korea

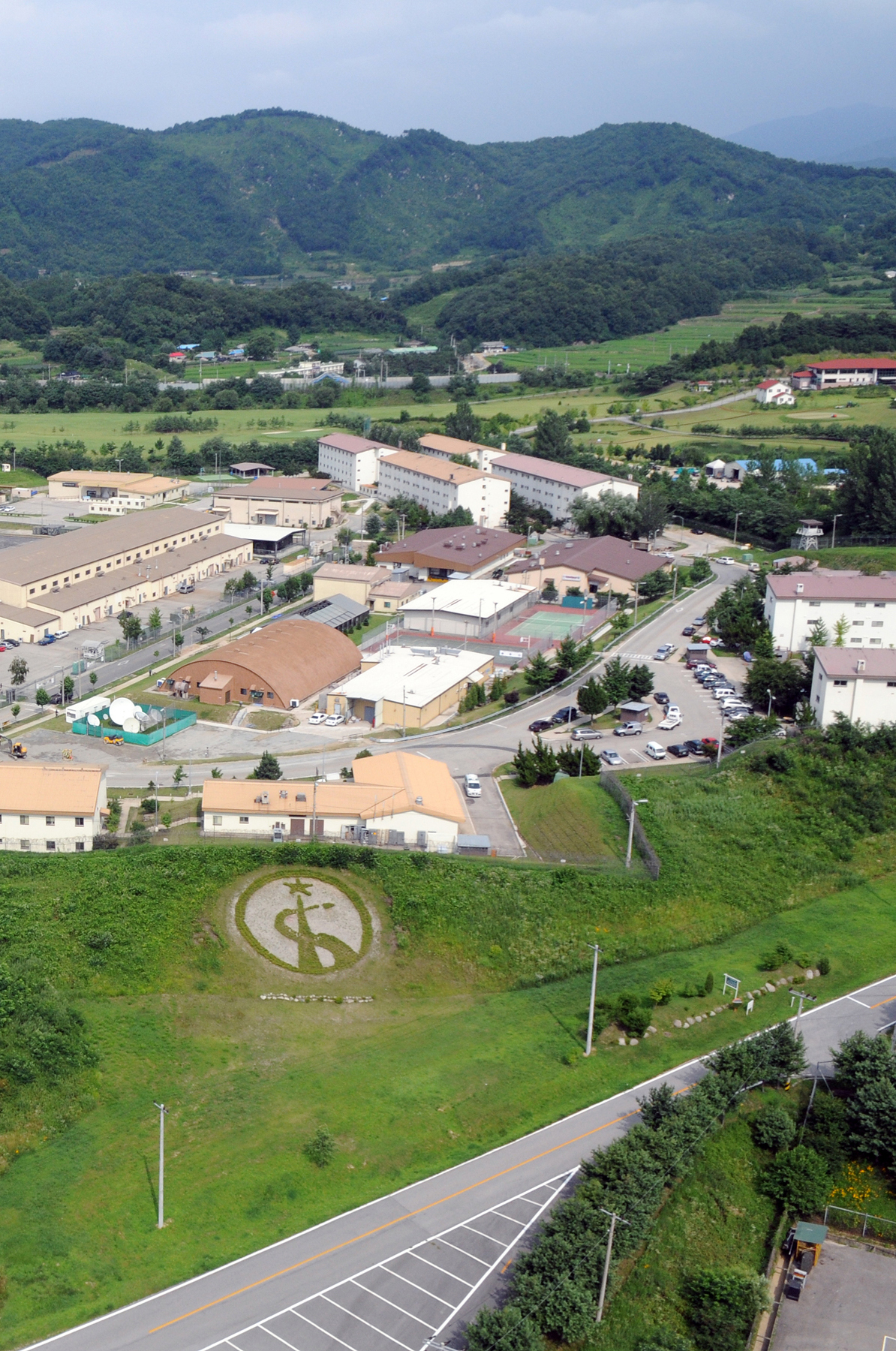
Camp Eagle in 2008.

The U.S. Army Garrison Camp Long was a U.S. Army installation located near Wonju, South Korea. This camp was named in honor of Sergeant Charles R. Long of the U.S. Army, who received the Medal of Honor for his actions nearby in 1951 during the Korean War. Sergeant Long was acting as a forward observer in Company M of the 38th Infantry Regiment, 2nd Infantry Division when he was killed in action.

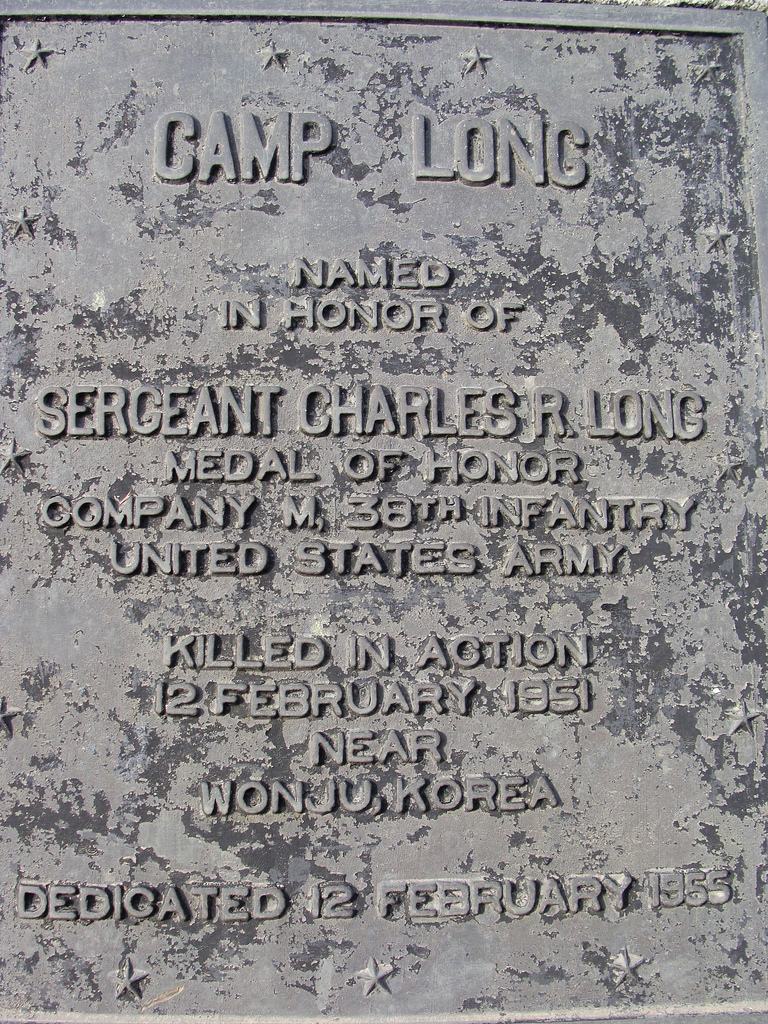
Memorial Plaque to Sergeant Long

Camp Long incloses 82 acres in a suburb of Taejang, approximately 180 miles ESE of Seoul and about 50 miles south of the DMZ, in the Kwangwon-bo Province (Gangwon Province). In 2006, there were 126 buildings on site, comprising 311,919 square feet.

== Base history ==
Established in 1955, in 1970, Camp Long was organized to support tenant units at the R-401 Airfield. The unit was assigned to the 20th General Support Group under operational control of the Commanding General, First Republic of Korea Army (FROKA) Detachment, Korean Military Advisory Group. In 1978, it was reassigned to the 19th Support Command, Commander, Camp Page.

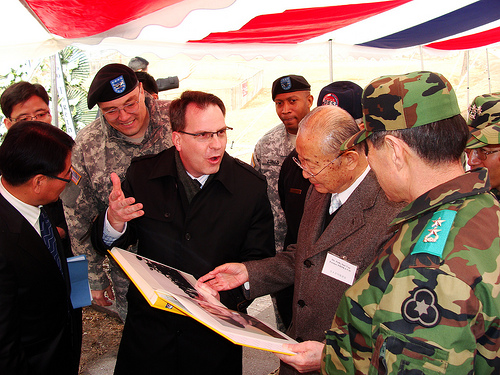
A memorial ceremony for Sergeant Long in 2009. Over 40 Area III Soldiers, civilians, retirees and Republic of Korea Soldiers paid homage to Sgt. Charles Long – the namesake of Camp Long – at a memorial ceremony Feb. 12 in Wonju. During the ceremony, Brent Abare, executive assistant for base operations in Wonju, presented Gen. Paik Sun-yup former First Republic of Korea Army commander and revered Korean War hero with an album of recently discovered Korean War era photos. Photos in the album included images of Paik during Camp Long’s dedication ceremony – 54 years ago.

In 1987, Camp Long and Camp Page came under the command of the 501st Corps Support Group.

In 1998, there were 500 active duty personnel and approximately 550 civilians assigned to the base. All personnel live on post, and most served a one-year unaccompanied tour of duty.

"Tenant Units located on Camp Long included:Combat Support Coordination team#1, B Company, 168th Medical battalion; 275th Signal Detachment, 41st Signal Battalion, 1st Signal Brigade; 665th Medical Detachment, 18th MEDCOM; Dental Clinic; 524th Military Intelligence Detachment; Detachment 452 (Air Force); 62nd Chemical Company; a section of 66th AG Postal Detachment, and a rotating law enforcement platoon from the 557th MP Company."

Seismic studies were investigated and observations were made at Camp Long. "Three alternate approaches for transmitting the data from Camp Long to the Pacific Intelsat satellite were investigated: a. use of a local commercial terrestrial microwave system for Wonju (just outside Camp Long) to Kum San via Seoul; b. use of a military terrestrial system from Camp Long to Yongsan (just outside Seoul), then into Seoul, and down to If Kum San via a commercial terrestrial microwave system; and c. installation of a nonstandard earth station at Camp Long for direct access to the Pacific satellite. Of these options, installation of a nonstandard earth station at Camp Long would not be authorized by the Korean Ministry of Communications (HOC). The use of the military microwave links was not recommended due to the poor quality of the system. STRATCOM personnel in Korea stated that new radio equipment (AN/FRC-109) 'was to be installed between Comp Long and Yongsan during the first quarter of 1974; however, neither the installation nor the quality of service the link can maintain has been confirmed.'"

Commercial facilities included a bank, dry cleaners, barber shop and an AAFES Post Exchange. In 2007, an article explained about the closing of the PX after a financial scandal was exposed: "The Camp Long PX is a small PX and was able to make $2.77 million in sales in 2004 and then once the black marketing ring was caught and shut down sales dropped to $172,000 this year. That is a difference of $2,598,000 dollars. Just think how much money the larger PXs and especially the commissaries are bringing in for the black marketers? The amounts of money being made is mind-boggling."

Medical facilities include a dental clinic, pharmacy and dispensary.

For recreational facilities, there is a bowling center, gym, recreational center, tennis courts, racquetball court, fitness center, weight room, softball field, football field, craft shop, officers club, NCO club, enlisted club and playground.

There were no on-base schools or college programs. However, Betty Jo Alexander was the "Assistant education services officer, Department of the Army, Camp Long, Korea, 1989-91." Camp personnel also helped in local educational matters. "A graduate of Cattaraugus (N.Y.) Little Valley High School, Sergeant Shannon Eichenseer volunteered to help teach English to children at an orphanage in Wonju, Korea, while she was stationed at Camp Long"

There was a Morale, Welfare and Recreation base library operated by Nonappropriated Fund Instrumentalities (NAFI). Robert Lee Hadden was the "Supervisory librarian, USAG Camp Long, Wonju, Republic of Korea, 1984—1985."

== Base closure ==
On June 4, 2010, Camp Eagle and Camp Long were both closed, consolidating the installation support activities of the U.S. Army Garrison Camp Humphreys.

"YONGSAN GARRISON, Republic of Korea - Eighth U.S. Army announced plans to close Camps Eagle and Long in the Wonju area Oct. 5, continuing the base relocation of U.S. forces and the return of valuable real estate to the Republic of Korea as part of the Land Partnership Plan. U.S. Army Garrison Humphreys and Area III Commander Col. Joseph P. Moore briefed the workers of both camps on the impending closures Oct. 5. Moore said his intent is that no employee will lose his or her job as a result of the closure as long as they are willing to relocate to Humphreys or, in some cases, learn a new trade or skill. The two installations are currently home to 386 military and civilian personnel, including 176 Korean employees. Originally scheduled to close in 2008, the closure is expected to occur in 2010. The installations will eventually be returned to the ROK government. The timeline for closure and return is still being determined. Activities currently being conducted at the camps will be transferred to Camp Humphreys. U.S. Army plans call for the relocation of all forces to two hubs around Pyongtaek and Daegu by 2016. Benefits of this plan include a less intrusive presence in congested urban areas, increased safety for people in communities throughout the country and consolidated installations that will promote a higher quality of life than was possible on smaller, less modern bases."

== See also ==
- List of United States Army installations in South Korea

== Bibliography ==
- Betty Jo Alexander. n.d. Print. Marquis Who's Who. OCLC: 4779314096.
- "Eighth U.S. Army to return Camps Eagle, Long." by 8th U.S. Army Public Affairs. October 7, 2009.
- Evinger, William R., ed. 1998. Directory of US Military Bases Worldwide. Third edition. Oryx Press.
- Robert Lee Hadden. n.d.. Print. Marquis Who's Who.
- Department of Defense Base Structure Report (A Summary of DoD's Real Property Inventory) Fiscal Year 2006 Baseline. 2006. OFFICE OF THE DEPUTY UNDER SECRETARY OF DEFENSE (INSTALLATIONS AND ENVIRONMENT) WASHINGTON DC. Page Army-25.
