= 1st Personnel Command =

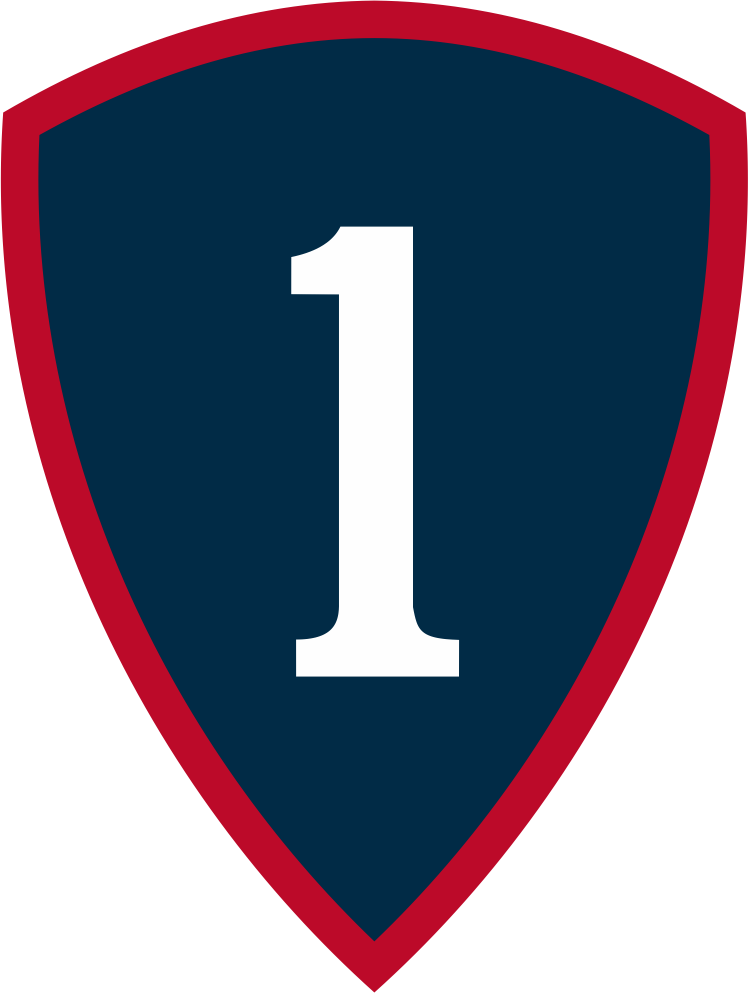
- Shoulder sleeve insignia
- Active: 20 October 1978 - 26 June 2008
- Country: United States
- Branch: United States Army
- Part of: United States Army Europe
- Garrison/HQ: Kilbourne Kaserne, Schwetzingen, Germany
- Motto: First Class All The Way
- Engagements: Operation Desert Shield; Operation Desert Storm; Operation Iraqi Freedom
- Final Commander, June 2008: Col. David T. Jones

Insignia
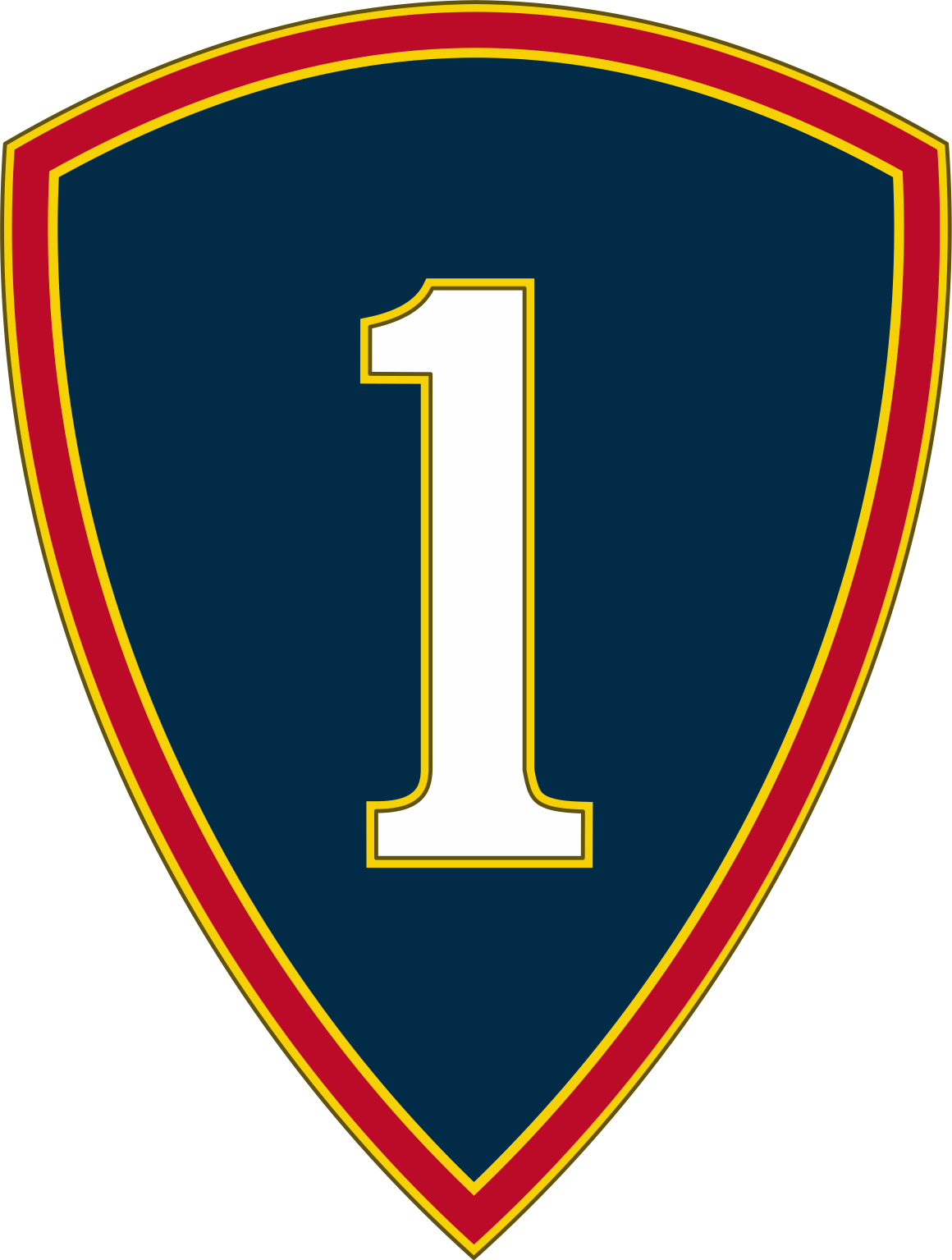
- Combat service identification badge

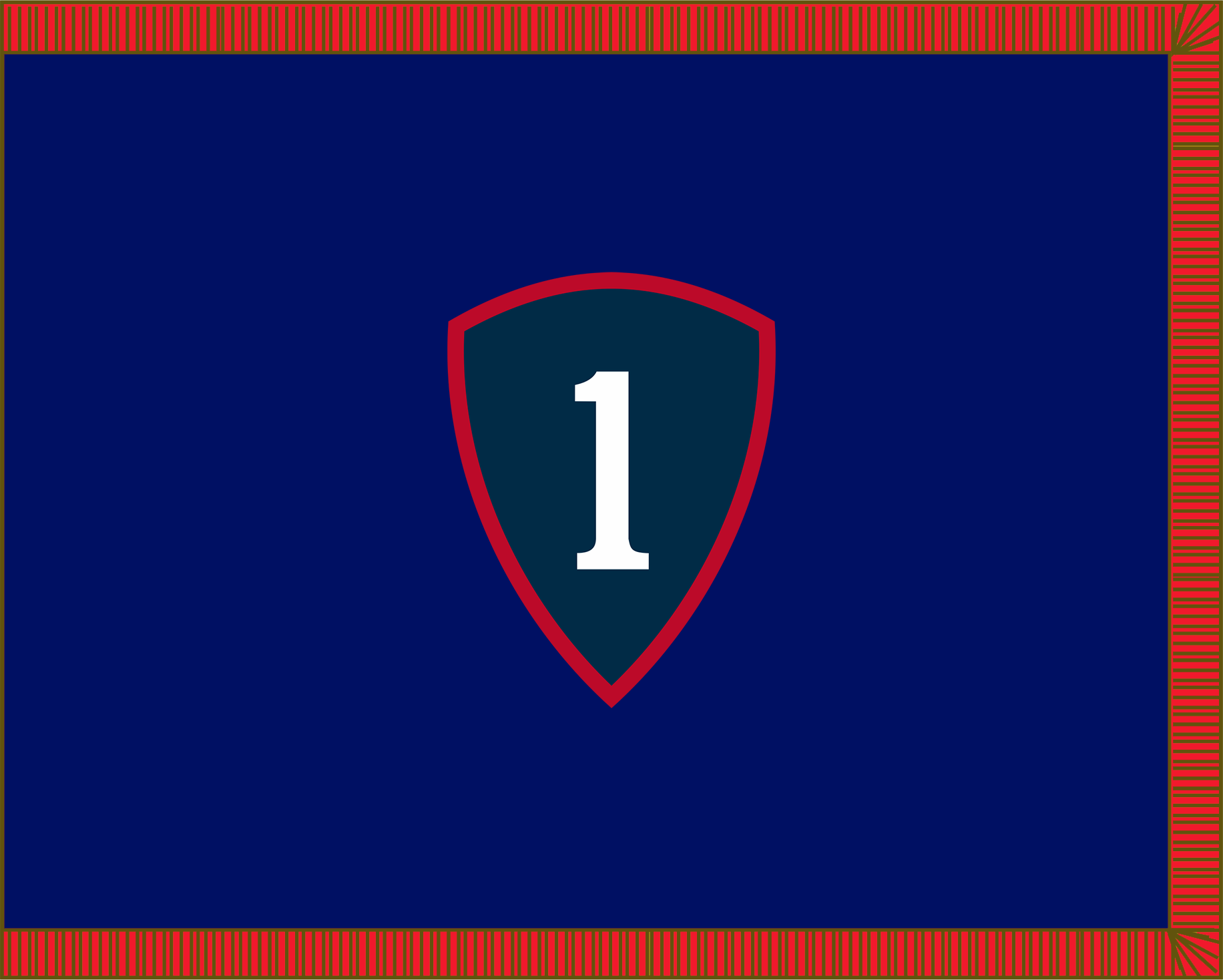
- 1st Personnel Command Flag

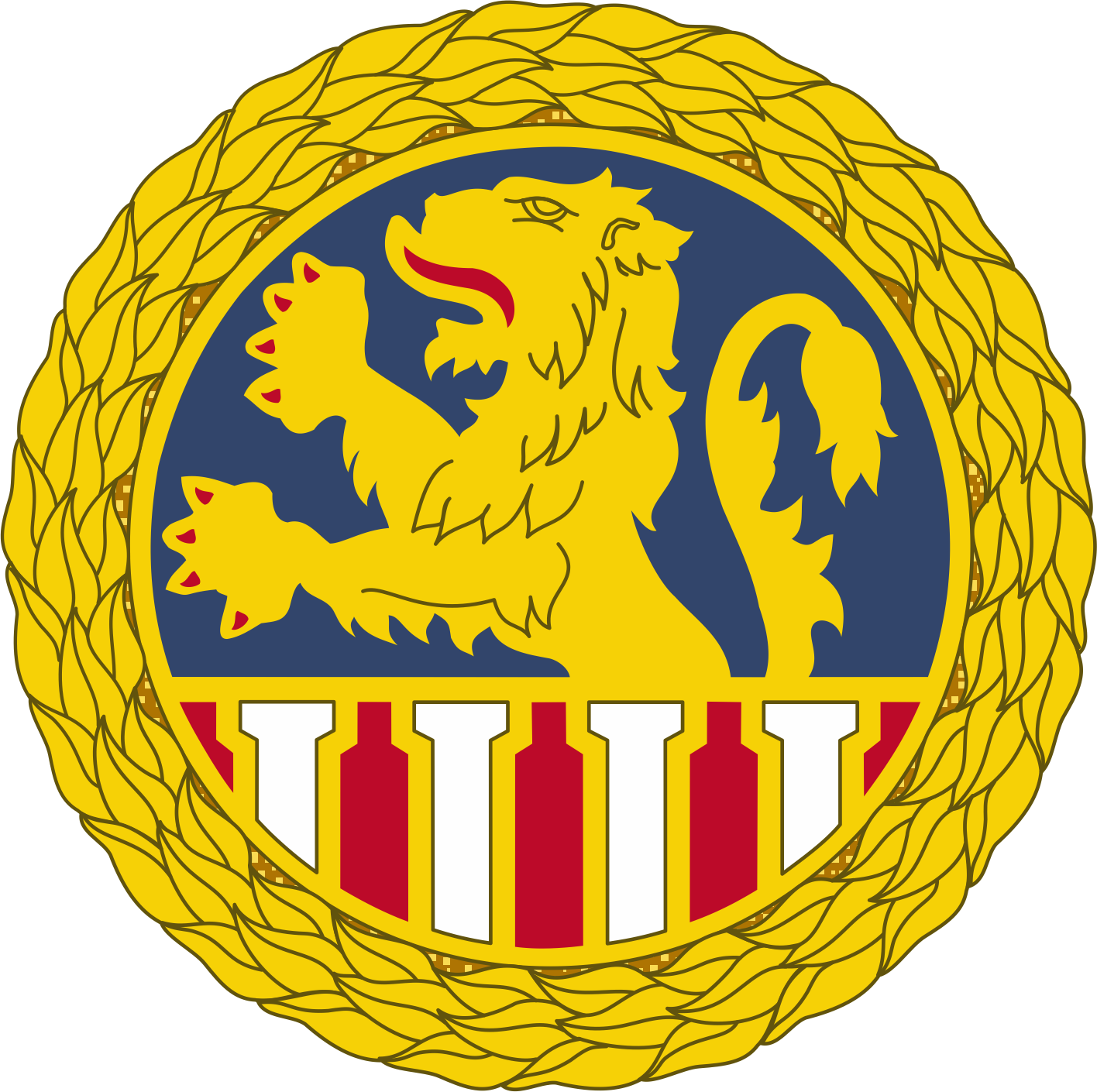
- 1st Personnel Command DUI

The 1st Personnel Command (1ST PERSCOM) was a command of U.S. Army Europe responsible for personnel management and administration. 1st Personnel Command was stood up 20 October 1978 to replace MILPERCEN, Europe and was the first Army Theater Personnel Command and cased its colors on 26 June 2008. The command had personnel companies, post offices, army postal units and replacement units as subordinate units. The command was granted campaign participation credit for the global war on terrorism. 1st Personnel Command was formed to replace the U.S. Army Military Personnel Center, Europe, a staff activity created in 1974. Upon disbandment, the mission of the 1st Personnel Command was taken over by the 21st Theater Sustainment Command.

== Commanders ==
- Brigadier General Robert M. Joyce (October 1978—April 1979)
- Brigadier General William G. O'Leksy (April 1979—August 1983)
- Brigadier General Charles F. Briggs (August 1983—August 1984)
- Brigadier General William H. Gourley (August 1984—October 1987)
- Major General William H. Gourley (October 1987—1989)
- Brigadier General Mary Willis (1989-1991)
- Colonel Samuel B. Retherford
- Colonel David K. MacEwen (2005-2007)
- Colonel David T. Jones (2007-2008)

== See also ==
- 3rd Personnel Command
- 8th Personnel Command
- 10th Personnel Command
