= John U. D. Page =

US Army Medal of Honor recipient (1904–1950)

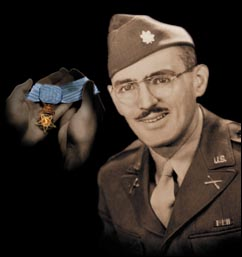
- Medal of Honor recipient John U.D. Page
- Born: February 8, 1904; Malahi Island, (now in modern-day Binangonan, Rizal), Philippines
- Died: December 11, 1950 (aged 46); Sudong, North Korea
- Burial place: Arlington National Cemetery
- Military career
- Allegiance: United States of America
- Branch: United States Army
- Service years: 1926–1950
- Rank: Lieutenant Colonel
- Unit: X Corps Artillery
- Conflicts: World War II; Korean War; Battle of Chosin Reservoir †
- Awards: Medal of Honor; Navy Cross; Purple Heart

John Upshur Dennis Page (February 8, 1904 – December 11, 1950) was a United States Army officer from Saint Paul, Minnesota. Lieutenant Colonel Page received the Medal of Honor for his actions in the Battle of Chosin Reservoir during the Korean War.st

== Early life ==
John U.D. Page was born in the Philippines and studied engineering at Princeton University. Princeton was Page's second choice, when his dream of attending West Point was thwarted by weak eyesight. He graduated from Princeton in 1926 with a varsity letter in pistol and a Reserve Officers' Training Corps (ROTC) commission, and was called to duty in World War II as a reservist.

== World War II ==
Trained in artillery, Page was considered an expert teacher, and he spent much of World War II training troops at Fort Sill, Okla., much to his chagrin. He finally got to command an artillery battery in Germany, and remained in the military after World War II. Assigned to the prestigious Command and General Staff College at Fort Leavenworth, Kansas, he pulled strings to go to Korea rather than to the classroom.

== Korean War ==
Assigned to X Corps Artillery, he was killed in action during the Battle of Chosin Reservoir while engaging the enemy single-handedly to protect a United States Marines regimental convoy.

== Citations ==
=== Medal of Honor ===
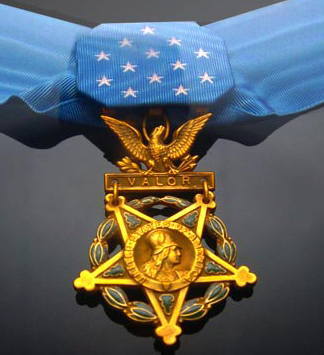

John U. D. Page
Rank and organization: Lieutenant Colonel, U.S. Army, X Corps Artillery, while attached to the 52d Transportation Truck Battalion.
Place and date: Near Chosin Reservoir, Korea, November 29, to December 10, 1950.
Entered service at: St. Paul, Minn.
Born: February 8, 1904, Malahi Island, Luzon, Philippine Islands.
G.O. No.: 21, April 25, 1957.

Citation:

Lt. Col. Page, a member of X Corps Artillery, distinguished himself by conspicuous gallantry and intrepidity in action above and beyond the call of duty in a series of exploits. On 29 November, Lt. Col. Page left X Corps Headquarters at Hamhung with the mission of establishing traffic control on the main supply route to 1st Marine Division positions and those of some Army elements on the Chosin Reservoir plateau. Having completed his mission Lt. Col. Page was free to return to the safety of Hamhung but chose to remain on the plateau to aid an isolated signal station, thus being cut off with elements of the marine division. After rescuing his jeep driver by breaking up an ambush near a destroyed bridge Lt. Col. Page reached the lines of a surrounded marine garrison at Koto-ri. He then voluntarily developed and trained a reserve force of assorted army troops trapped with the marines. By exemplary leadership and tireless devotion he made an effective tactical unit available. In order that casualties might be evacuated, an airstrip was improvised on frozen ground partly outside of the Koto-ri defense perimeter which was continually under enemy attack. During 2 such attacks, Lt. Col. Page exposed himself on the airstrip to direct fire on the enemy, and twice mounted the rear deck of a tank, manning the machine gun on the turret to drive the enemy back into a no man's land. On 3 December while being flown low over enemy lines in a light observation plane, Lt. Col. Page dropped hand grenades on Chinese positions and sprayed foxholes with automatic fire from his carbine. After 10 days of constant fighting the marine and army units in the vicinity of the Chosin Reservoir had succeeded in gathering at the edge of the plateau and Lt. Col. Page was flown to Hamhung to arrange for artillery support of the beleaguered troops attempting to break out. Again Lt. Col. Page refused an opportunity to remain in safety and returned to give every assistance to his comrades. As the column slowly moved south Lt. Col. Page joined the rear guard. When it neared the entrance to a narrow pass it came under frequent attacks on both flanks. Mounting an abandoned tank Lt. Col. Page manned the machine gun, braved heavy return fire, and covered the passing vehicles until the danger diminished. Later when another attack threatened his section of the convoy, then in the middle of the pass, Lt. Col. Page took a machine gun to the hillside and delivered effective counterfire, remaining exposed while men and vehicles passed through the ambuscade. On the night of 10 December the convoy reached the bottom of the pass but was halted by a strong enemy force at the front and on both flanks. Deadly small-arms fire poured into the column. Realizing the danger to the column as it lay motionless, Lt. Col. Page fought his way to the head of the column and plunged forward into the heart of the hostile position. His intrepid action so surprised the enemy that their ranks became disordered and suffered heavy casualties. Heedless of his safety, as he had been throughout the preceding 10 days, Lt. Col. Page remained forward, fiercely engaging the enemy single-handed until mortally wounded. By his valiant and aggressive spirit Lt. Col. Page enabled friendly forces to stand off the enemy. His outstanding courage, unswerving devotion to duty, and supreme self-sacrifice reflect great credit upon Lt. Col. Page and are in the highest tradition of the military service.

=== Navy Cross ===

Citation:

The President of the United States of America takes pride in presenting the Navy Cross (Posthumously) to Lieutenant Colonel John Upshur Dennis Page, United States Army, for extraordinary heroism in connection with military operations against an armed enemy of the United Nations while attached to the 52d Transportation Truck Battalion (Attached), X Corps Artillery, in action against enemy aggressor forces near Sudong-ni, Korea, on 10 December 1950. When numerically superior enemy forces ambushed a Marine regimental convoy with which he was traveling, Lieutenant Colonel Page repeatedly exposed himself to intense hostile machine-gun, mortar and small-arms fire to move forward in an effort to organize friendly elements and reduce the roadblock. Realizing the extreme danger to the stationary convoy while under the relentless fire of enemy forces commanding high ground on both sides of the road, he bravely fought his way to the head of the column accompanied by a Marine private and, undaunted by point-blank machine-gun fire, continued directly into the hostile strong-point, taking thirty of the enemy completely by surprise and inflicting severe casualties among them. With the Marine private wounded by a hand-grenade fragment, Lieutenant Colonel Page ordered him to withdraw and provided him with covering fire, fiercely continuing to engage the enemy single-handedly and killing twelve of them before he himself was mortally wounded. By his valiant and aggressive fighting spirit in the face of overwhelming odds during this self-imposed mission, he was directly responsible in disrupting the hostile attack, thereby allowing the members of the convoy to regroup, re-deploy and fight off succeeding attacks. His outstanding courage, self-sacrificing efforts and unswerving devotion to duty reflect the highest credit upon Lieutenant Colonel Page and the United States Armed Forces. He gallantly gave his life for his country.

== Awards and Decorations ==
His decorations include:

Badge	Combat Infantryman Badge		
1st row	Medal of Honor	Navy Cross	Purple Heart
2nd row	American Defense Service Medal	American Campaign Medal	European-African-Middle Eastern Campaign Medal
3rd row	World War II Victory Medal	Army of Occupation Medal	National Defense Service Medal
4th row	Korean Service Medal with 2 Campaign stars	United Nations Service Medal Korea	Korean War Service Medal Retroactively Awarded, 2003
Unit Awards	Navy Presidential Unit Citation		Korean Presidential Unit Citation

== Namesakes and honors ==
In addition to his military awards, Page has also been honored by the following:

=== Ships ===
The only Beach Discharge Lighter in the US military, the 338 feet (103 m) landing craft, USAV Lt. Col. John U.D. Page (BDL X1) was in service from 1958 to 1992. The Military Sealift Command ship MV LTC John U.D. Page (T-AK-4496) is also named in his honor.

=== Camp Page ===
Camp Page, near Chunchon, South Korea, was the home of the Apache unit linked to the 2nd Infantry Division at the DMZ until it was closed in 2005.

== See also ==
- List of Medal of Honor recipients
- List of Korean War Medal of Honor recipients
- Richard E. Killblane, Convoy Ambush Case Studies Vol. I, Korea and Vietnam, US Army Transportation School, 2014
