= Charles R. Long =

American U.S. Army soldier

Charles Richard Long
- Medal of Honor recipient
- Born: December 10, 1923; Kansas City, Missouri
- Died: February 12, 1951 (aged 27) near Hoengseong, Korea
- Burial place: Mount Washington Forever Cemetery, Independence, Missouri
- Military career
- Allegiance: United States of America
- Branch: United States Army
- Service years: 1943–1951
- Rank: Sergeant
- Nickname: "Buddy"
- Units: 38th Infantry Regiment, 2nd Infantry Division
- Conflicts: World War II: Western Allied invasion of Germany; Battle of the Bulge; Korean War: Fourth Phase Offensive; Battle of Hoengsong †
- Awards: Medal of Honor; Purple Heart

Charles Richard Long (December 10, 1923 – February 12, 1951) was a United States Army soldier who received the United States military's highest decoration, the Medal of Honor, for his actions in the Korean War. A native of Independence, Missouri, Long joined the Army after high school and served in Europe during World War II. Recalled to active duty for the Korean War, he served as a sergeant and forward observer for a mortar platoon. He was posthumously awarded the Medal of Honor for his conduct during the Battle of Hoengsong when assaulted by a numerically superior force on February 12, 1951, he voluntarily remained at his forward post and continued to direct mortar fire until being overrun and killed.

== Early life ==
Long was born on December 10, 1923, in Kansas City, Missouri, the middle child of Lois and Fritz Long. He had an older brother, Robert, and a younger sister, Edith. He went by his middle name, but his immediate family referred to him as "Buddy". Growing up in the Mount Washington area of Independence, Long delivered newspapers for The Kansas City Star, worked for the Fairmount Inter-City News, and sold soda pop at a bus station. His family was poor and took in boarders for extra money. He graduated from Kansas City's Northeast High School in 1941, and was drafted 2 years later in 1943

== Military service ==
During World War II, Long served in Europe and participated in the Battle of the Bulge in the winter of 1944–1945. He remained in the Army Reserve after the war until being recalled to active duty at the outbreak of hostilities in Korea.

By February 12, 1951, he was serving in Korea as a sergeant with Company M of the 38th Infantry Regiment, 2nd Infantry Division. In the early morning hours of that day, on Hill 300 near Hoengseong, he was acting as a forward observer for the company's mortar platoon when they came under attack by a numerically superior force. Although ordered to withdraw, Long voluntarily stayed at his advance post, holding off the enemy with his M1 Carbine and hand grenades while continuing to direct mortar fire via radio. His last radio message stated that he was out of ammunition and called for a 40-round mortar strike near his position. He was surrounded and killed soon after. For these actions, he was posthumously awarded the Medal of Honor a year later, on February 1, 1952. The medal was presented to his family by President Harry S. Truman.

Aged 27 at his death, Long was buried at Mount Washington Forever Cemetery in his hometown of Independence.

== Posthumous honors ==
Several military facilities have been named in Long's honor, including the U.S. Army's Camp Long near Wonju, South Korea, and the Charles R. Long Army Reserve Center in Independence. Also in Independence is the Truman Memorial Building, which holds a display in memory of Long. In July 2010, a bridge on U.S. Route 24 in the Fairmount area of Independence, not far from Long's childhood home, was renamed the Sgt. Charles R. Long Memorial Bridge. A new Department of Defense Dependents Elementary School located on Camp Humphreys, South Korea will be named Charles R. Long Elementary School when it is completed in 2013.

== Medal of Honor citation ==
Long's official citation reads:

Sgt. Long, a member of Company M, distinguished himself by conspicuous gallantry and intrepidity above and beyond the call of duty in action against an armed enemy of the United Nations. When Company M, in a defensive perimeter on Hill 300, was viciously attacked by a numerically superior hostile force at approximately 0300 hours and ordered to withdraw, Sgt. Long, a forward observer for the mortar platoon, voluntarily remained at his post to provide cover by directing mortar fire on the enemy. Maintaining radio contact with his platoon, Sgt. Long coolly directed accurate mortar fire on the advancing foe. He continued firing his carbine and throwing handgrenades until his position was surrounded and he was mortally wounded. Sgt. Long's inspirational, valorous action halted the onslaught, exacted a heavy toll of enemy casualties, and enabled his company to withdraw, reorganize, counterattack, and regain the hill strongpoint. His unflinching courage and noble self-sacrifice reflect the highest credit on himself and are in keeping with the honored traditions of the military service.

== Awards and Decorations ==
Sergeant Long received the following awards for his service.

Badge	Combat Infantryman Badge with Star denoting 2nd award		
1st row	Medal of Honor		Bronze Star Medal Retroactively Awarded, 1947
3rd row	Purple Heart	Army Good Conduct Medal	American Campaign Medal
4th row	European-African-Middle Eastern Campaign Medal with 3 Campaign stars	World War II Victory Medal	National Defense Service Medal
5th row	Korean Service Medal with 4 Campaign stars	United Nations Service Medal Korea	Korean War Service Medal Retroactively Awarded, 2003
Unit Awards	Presidential Unit Citation		Korean Presidential Unit Citation

2nd Infantry Division Insignia

== See also ==
- List of Korean War Medal of Honor recipients
