= Patrick Madigan =

American military officer (1887–1944)

Patrick S. Madigan
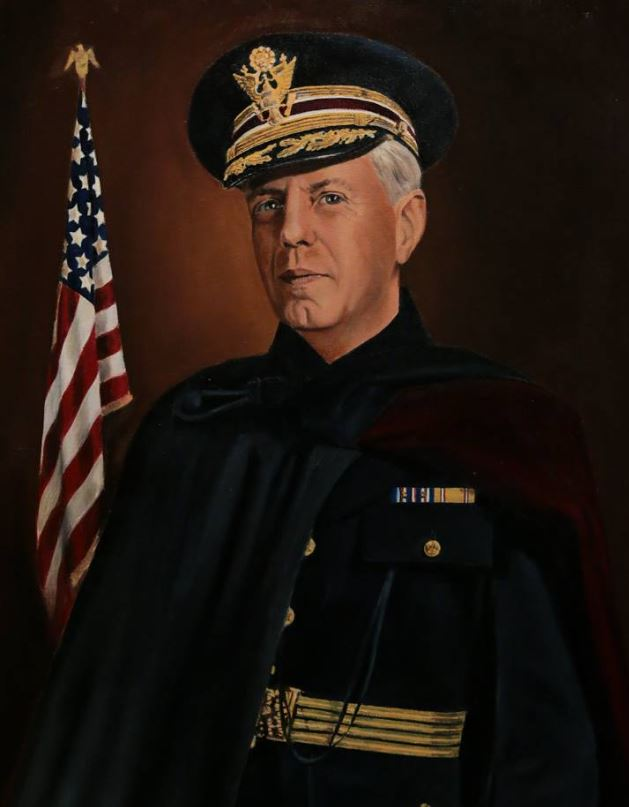

Assistant to the Surgeon General of the United States
- In office 1940–1943

Personal details
- Born: February 14, 1887 Washington, D.C., United States
- Died: May 8, 1944 (aged 57) Fort Belvoir, Virginia, United States
- Spouse: Mary Shugrue
- Education: Georgetown University (BA, MD); Gonzaga University (MA)
- Occupation: Military officer, Physician

Military service
- Branch/service: United States Army
- Rank: Colonel
- Battles/wars: World War I World War II

Patrick Sarsfield Madigan (February 14, 1887 – May 8, 1944) was an American military officer in the United States Army who served as Assistant to the Surgeon General from 1940 to 1943.

== Early life and education ==
Madigan was born in Washington, D.C. to Irish Catholics John Joseph Madigan and Mary Joseph Daly. He had two brothers and three sisters. Both of his brothers were in the Army Medical Corps, one of them retiring as a Colonel and another resigning to practice in a non-military setting.

Madigan attended Georgetown University and earned a Bachelor of Arts 1908 and a Medical degree in 1912. In 1914, he earned a Master of Arts from Gonzaga University.

== Career ==
In August 1917, Madigan became an officer in the United States Army's 64th Infantry Regiment and was deployed to France in World War I. At the end of the war, he became a neurophysicist in Norfolk, Virginia and later returned to Washington, D.C. to take a job at Walter Reed General Hospital.

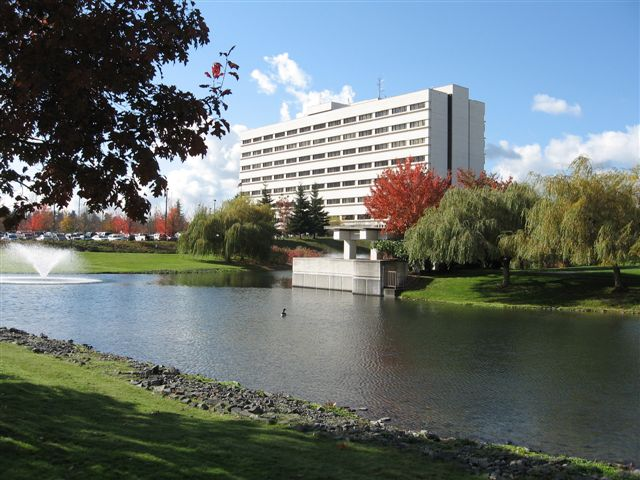
Madigan Army Medical Center, named for Patrick Madigan.

In 1926, Madigan became Chief of Neuropsychiatry at Sternberg General Hospital in the Philippine Islands and then returned to Walter Reed to take the same position there.

In 1940, Madigan was appointed Assistant to the Surgeon General, a position he held until 1943.

== Personal life ==
Madigan was married to Mary Shugrue. He was opposed to on-demand abortions and wrote about this belief in his papers and journals.

Madigan died in Fort Belvoir, Virginia, on May 8, 1944, at the age of 57. He was buried in Arlington National Cemetery. He had two sons. One, Emmett Patrick Madigan, became a doctor.

== Legacy ==
Madigan Army Medical Center at Joint Base Lewis–McChord, Washington was named for Madigan.
