= William H. Gourley =

United States Army general

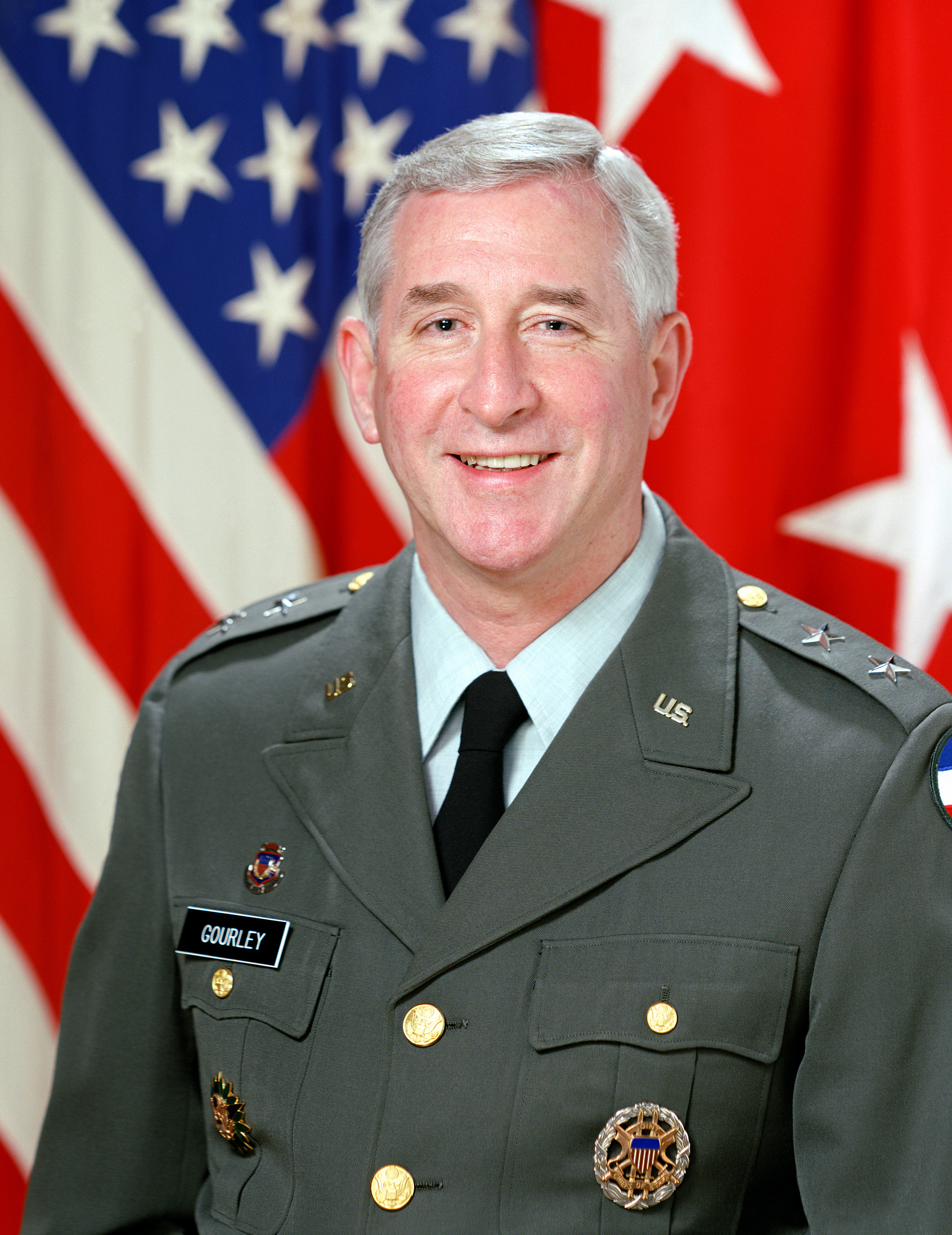
- Born: 13 February 1933; Philadelphia, Pennsylvania, U.S.
- Died: 25 August 2008 (aged 75); Monterey, California, U.S.
- Military career
- Allegiance: United States
- Branch: United States Army
- Service years: 1955–1989
- Rank: Major General
- Commands: 1st Personnel Command, United States Army Personnel Command
- Conflicts: Vietnam War

William Harvey Gourley (13 February 1933 – 25 August 2008) was a major general in the United States Army. He served as Commanding General of the 1st Personnel Command.

Born and raised in Philadelphia, Gourley attended Temple University and participated in the Army ROTC program there. He earned a B.S. degree in management from Temple and was commissioned a second lieutenant in 1955. Gourley later earned an M.B.A. degree from Indiana University in 1964.

During his military career, Gourley was deployed to Germany, Vietnam, Turkey and South Korea. He retired from active duty on 30 November 1989.

Gourley moved to Monterey, California, after his retirement and became involved in planning the civilian reuse of Fort Ord after it was closed in 1994. As a result of his efforts, the Major General William H. Gourley VA-DoD Outpatient Clinic opened in Marina, California in 2017.

== Personal ==
Gourley married Mary Quarrier "Molly" Morris (18 September 1932 – 14 March 2008) in 1957. They had a son, three daughters, and nine grandchildren. He had a sister and a brother. Gourley and his wife were interred at Arlington National Cemetery.
