= CAAC Flight 296 =

1983 aircraft hijacking

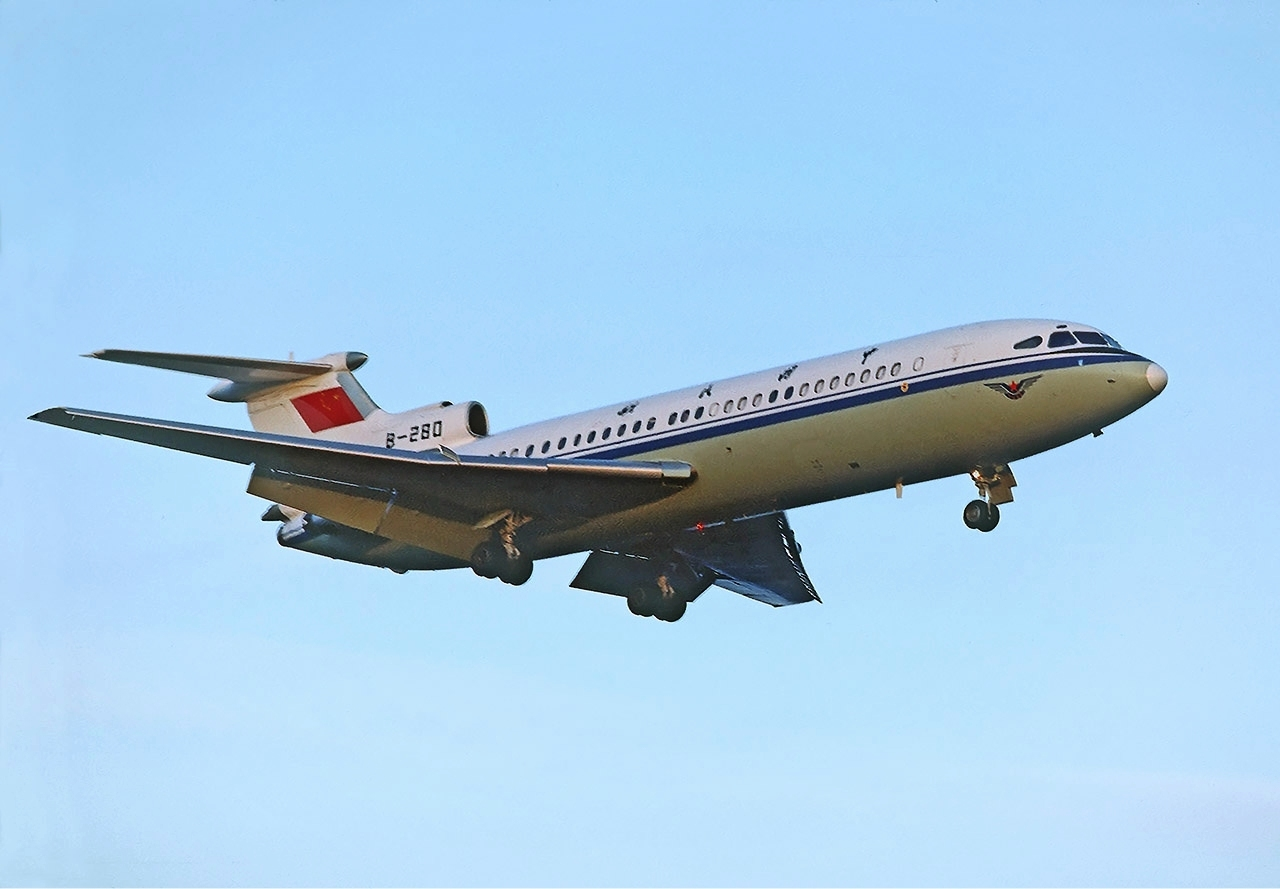
- A CAAC Hawker Siddeley Trident, similar to the one involved

Hijacking
- Date: May 5, 1983
- Summary: Domestic Chinese passenger flight hijacked to South Korea
- Site: Camp Page, South Korea

Aircraft
- Aircraft type: Hawker Siddeley Trident 2E
- Operator: CAAC Airlines
- Registration: B-296
- Flight origin: Shenyang Dongta Airport
- Destination: Shanghai Hongqiao International Airport
- Occupants: 114
- Passengers: 105
- Crew: 9
- Fatalities: 0
- Injuries: 2
- Survivors: 114

The hijacking of CAAC Flight 296, a Hawker Siddeley Trident 2E aircraft, took place on May 5, 1983. Flight 296 of China Civil Aviation Airlines (CAAC), a scheduled domestic passenger flight from Shenyang Dongta Airport to Shanghai Hongqiao International Airport, was hijacked by six Chinese nationals and was forced to land at Camp Page, a US military base in Chuncheon, South Korea.

At the time of the incident, China and South Korea did not have diplomatic relations. The incident contributed to the first official non-adversarial contact between China and South Korea before the establishment of diplomatic relations, which was a turning point in the relationship between the two sides. In the following series of incidents, the mutual hostility between China and South Korea in the process of handling or reporting began to fade, and the goodwill component increased greatly, laying a foundation for the formal establishment of diplomatic relations between the two countries in the future.

== Course of events ==
At 10:47 am on May 5, 1983, CAAC Flight 296 took off from Shenyang Dongta Airport to Shanghai Hongqiao Airport. At around 11:32 am, when the plane was flying above Dalian, six armed people led by Zhuo Changren hijacked the flight and ordered the pilot to change route to South Korea. When the pilot refused, the hijackers shot him in a leg with a pistol and also hurt the operator, forcing them to proceed as demanded. There were 105 passengers and 9 crew members on board the plane. At 14ː10 hours, the hijacked plane landed at Camp Page military base near Chuncheon, South Korea. The Chinese Foreign Ministry spokesperson immediately issued a communication requesting the South Korean authorities to return the aircraft together with all crew members and all passengers to China's Civil Aviation in accordance with the relevant provisions of the Convention on International Civil Aviation, and hand over the hijackers to the Chinese side. Zhuo Changren and the other six hijackers filed a request to the Korean authorities to allow them to defect to Taiwan.

On the day of the incident, US State Department Deputy Spokesman Longberg informed reporters about the hijacking: two injured crew members were being treated at the US Army 121 Hospital, 99 passengers and the crew members (5 men and 1 woman) were released. Six hijackers were been detained by the Korean authorities. He said that the cooperation between the United States and South Korea will be carried out in accordance with the Hague Convention. Taiwan's World Anti-Communist Alliance Chairman Ku Cheng-kang called South Korea on the same day, claiming that the hijacking incident was purely a political incident and should not be handled in accordance with the Hague Convention, and requested South Korea to send the hijackers to Taiwan. The Government of the Republic of China also immediately formed a special action group ready to go to South Korea to assist in the negotiations. Xue Yu, the ambassador of the Republic of China to South Korea, issued a statement saying that the hijacking was "the freedom of the anti-communist people." On May 6, a South Korean government spokesman said that South Korea will handle the hijacking in accordance with the spirit of an international agreement to prevent air hijacking and terrorist activities, and is considering the proposal for direct negotiations between China and South Korea. The Director of the Civil Aviation Authority of South Korea, Jin Cherong, said that Shen Tu, the director of the Civil Aviation Administration of China, had agreed to come to Seoul to handle related matters.

Although South Korea and the People's Republic of China did not establish diplomatic relations at the time, the South Korean government properly arranged the crew and passengers on the hijacked passenger aircraft to stay at the Sheraton Hotel in the suburbs of Seoul. The hotel welcomed the Chinese guests who were hijacked and also offered high-end Chinese, Korean and Japanese dishes. The South Korean Ministry of Transportation and the South Korean Air Force sent senior technicians to inspect and repair the aircraft. On May 7, the Chinese civil aviation working group and crew members headed by Shen Tu were welcomed by the Korean government with a red carpet at the Gimpo Airport in Seoul, and arranged for the Chinese delegation to stay at the Shilla Hotel. At 4:10 pm on the same day, the two sides held their first meeting at the Shilla Hotel. After the talks, Shen Tu and his party went to the hospital to visit the injured crew and visited other crew members and passengers at the Sheraton Hotel. On the day, the Korean side arranged for Chinese guests who had been hijacked to visit Seoul, boarded the Namsan Tower, visited the factories of the department store and Samsung Electronics, and were warmly welcomed by the ROK.

On May 8, the two sides reached an agreement: passengers and crew members were to return to China with the delegation on the 9th; the hijacked aircraft would be returned to China immediately after the technical problems were resolved; a seriously injured crew member would stay in South Korea for treatment, and afterwards would return to China. The main difference between the two sides was the handling of hijackers. The Chinese side requested extradition, but the South Korean government refused the Chinese request on the grounds that "there have been no extraditions of prisoners in the hijacking incidents occurred in various countries." On the morning, Shen Tu issued a statement in Seoul expressing gratitude to the South Korean side for providing assistance and convenience in handling the hijacking incident. At the same time, he said that the six hijackers were criminals wanted by the Chinese police before the hijacking, and that therefore they should be returned to the Chinese side to be punished, he regretted that South Korea had refused to extradite the hijackers, and reserved the right to further negotiations.

At the time of drafting the memorandum, China and South Korea had new differences on the official identity of the signatory. The trip originally scheduled to return on the 9th had to be postponed by one day. The South Koreans argued that Shen Tu was a member of the Central Committee of the Chinese Communist Party and a representative of the Chinese government, and the Director of the Civil Aviation Administration of China was a ministerial-level official. Therefore, the two sides should be reflected in the memorandum of negotiations between the Chinese and South Korean ministers. The Chinese insisted on signing a memorandum in the name of civil aviation authorities, without the need to use the names of the countries. The Chinese also suggested that South Korea's official name be used in the copy of the memorandum retained by the South Korean government, while this detail could be ignored in the copy brought back by the Chinese side. However, South Korea rejected the Chinese proposal on the grounds of "ignoring the location of the negotiations" as "a sovereign state." After the Chinese representatives and the domestic communication, the two sides finally held a ceremony of signing and exchanging memoranda at the Shilla Hotel on May 10. The signatories of the memorandum were respectively Shen Tu representing the People's Republic of China and a representative of the Ministry of Foreign Affairs of the Republic of Korea. In the afternoon of the same day, Shen Tu and his team returned to China on a Boeing 707 plane with 99 passengers and 8 crew members of Flight 296. At the time of departure, senior Korean officials such as Gong Ro-myeong came to the airport to see the plane off. Before leaving, Shen Tu delivered a speech to the reporters. He expressed his gratitude to the South Korean for the assistance and care given to the hijacking. Although the two sides disagreed on the handling of hijackers, both sides agreed that these criminals should be severely punished according to law.

== Prosecution of the hijackers ==
On May 20, 1983, the local procuratorate of Seoul, South Korea, officially arrested the six hijackers and prosecuted them on June 1 for violating the Aircraft Navigation Safety Act. According to the Hague Convention, the Montreal Convention and the Korean Aircraft Navigation Safety Law, those who hijack an aircraft by means of violence or threats should be sentenced to imprisonment for an indefinite period of seven years or more, and those who kill or inflict injuries during the hijacking should be sentenced to death or indefinite imprisonment. However, under the request of the government of the Republic of China, the local criminal court in Seoul sentenced Zhou Changren, the principal offender, to six years on August 18, and five or four years in prison for the other hijackers. The Chinese side expressed dissatisfaction with this.

On August 13, 1984, South Korea pardoned the six hijackers and sent them to Taiwan. Upon arriving Taipei, the six sought asylum, being hailed as "Anti-Communist Heros" and they were given financial and lifepath assistance by the Free China Relief Association. In July 1991, Zhuo and Jiang conducted a kidnapping due to economic difficulties. The hostage was killed by the duo during the kidnapping. On August 10, 2001, they were executed by firing squad in Toucheng Detention Center.

== Effect on the relationship between China and South Korea ==
In August 1983, an agreement was reached to allow the civilian aircraft of the People's Republic of China to pass through the flight information zone of the Republic of Korea. It was also the occasion that started exchanges between the Republic of Korea and the People's Republic of China in non-political areas such as sports, culture, and tourism. Under the influence of formal diplomatic contact, the Korean athletes first participated in the Davis Tennis Cup tournament held in February 1984. In March 1984, the People's Republic of China allowed relatives across the border to interact with each other, and in April 1984, the People's Republic of China basketball team first visited the Republic of Korea. The overall relationship between the Republic of Korea and the People's Republic of China improved, leading to the establishment of formal diplomatic relations in 1992.

== See also ==
- China Airlines Flight 334, an aviation hijack happened 3 years later which restored relationship between mainland China and Taiwan.
