= Camp Page =

Former US Army base near Chuncheon, South Korea

- Chuncheon in South Korea

Site information
- Type: Military base
- Operator: United States Army

Location
- Coordinates: 37°53′6″N 127°43′45″E

Site history
- Built: March 1951
- In use: 1951–2005
- Fate: Demolished

Camp Page(캠프 페이지) also known as K-47 Air Base was a former US Army base located near Chuncheon, South Korea which was closed on 1 April 2005. It enclosed 157.2 acres in North Central South Korea, near Chuncheon City, 48 miles north of Seoul, in the Kangwon province. As of 5 February 2018, the only remaining structure on the site of the former Camp Page is the water tower. The site is being developed into an urban park.

== Base history ==
USAG Camp Page was named in honor of Medal of Honor recipient Lt. Col. John U. D. Page. John Upshur Dennis Page (February 8, 1904 – December 11, 1950) was a United States Army officer from Saint Paul, Minnesota. Lieutenant Colonel Page received the Medal of Honor for his actions in the Battle of Chosin Reservoir during the Korean War.

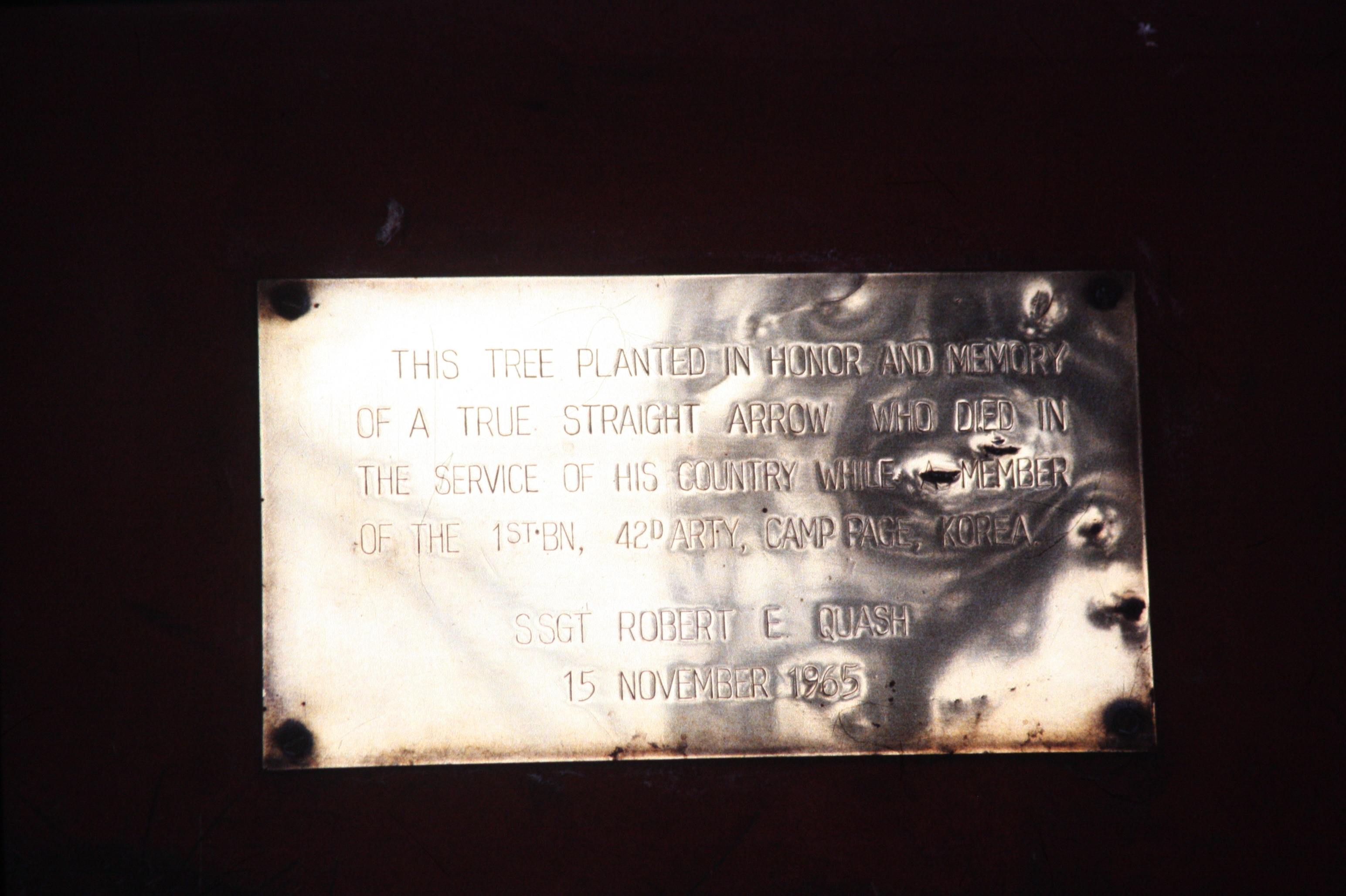
A memorial plaque to SSgt Robert E. Quash, who died at Camp Page, near Chuncheon, South Korea, on November 15, 1965. A tree was planted in his honor.

Other American servicemen who were honored at Camp Page for their ultimate sacrifice included Staff Sergeant Robert E. Quash, who died of a heart attack while with the First Battalion of the 42nd Artillery. He was only 30 years old, and was a native of Junction City, Kansas. In memoriam, a tree was planted in his honor on the post.

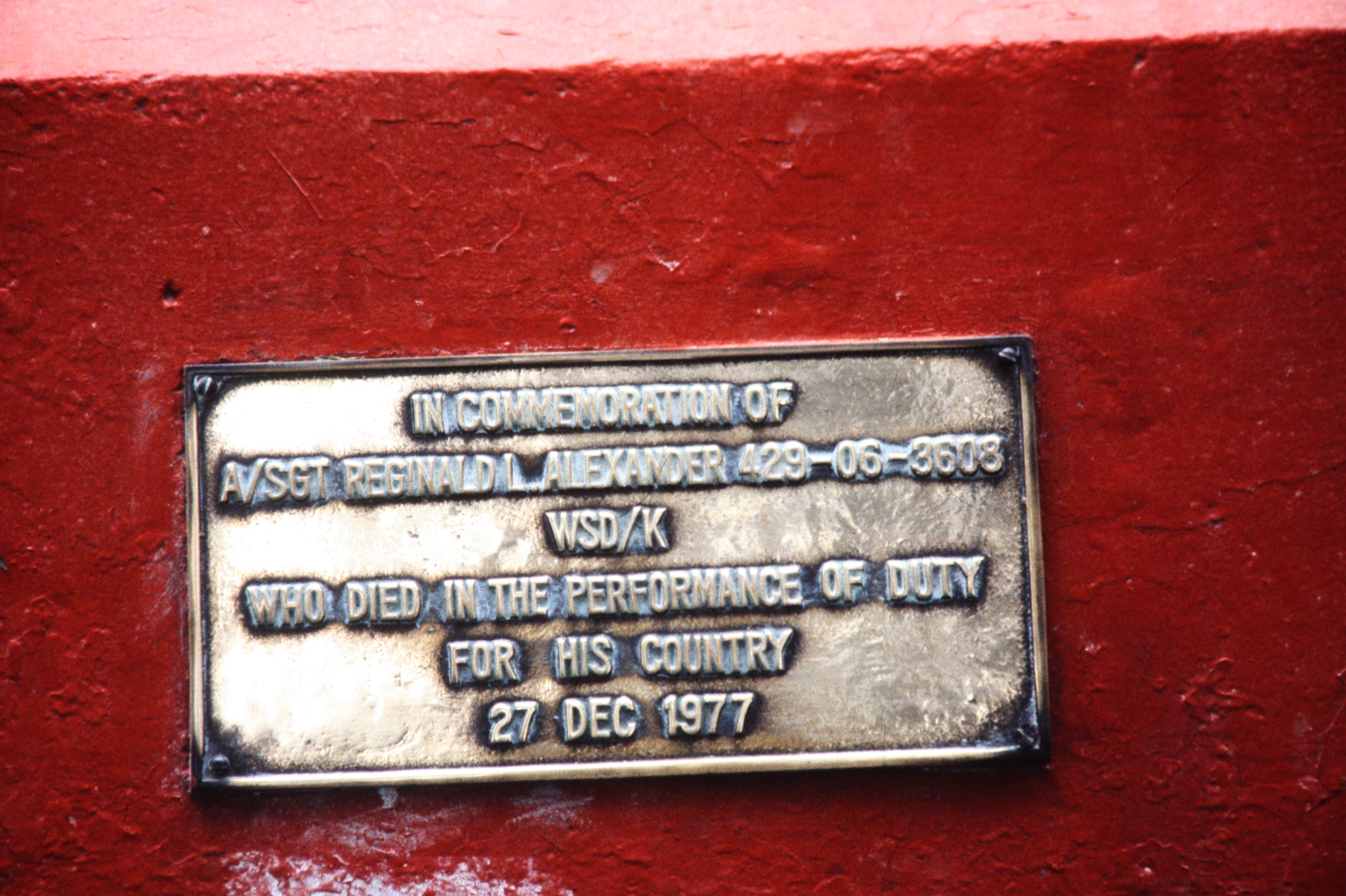
A/Sgt Reginald L. Alexander memorial plaque, USAG Camp Page, Chuncheon, South Korea

Another American serviceman died on the post. A/Sgt Reginald L. Alexander, "Who died in the performance of duty for his country." He died on December 27, 1977, at age 22. A memorial plaque in his honor was placed on the grounds of Camp Page.

There were 152 buildings on the site in 2006, enclosing 725,733 square feet.

"In 1964, 2nd Lt. William Ford, a recent graduate of the University of Oklahoma Army ROTC program, was headed to South Korea for his first assignment. 2nd Lt. William Ford poses with the Fourth Launcher Section, Battery B, 1st Missile Battalion, 42nd Artillery at Camp Page, South Korea in June 1965. Upon arrival in Korea, the young Field Artillery Officer was assigned to Bravo Battery, 1st Battalion, 42nd Field Artillery at Camp Page near Chuncheon. His unit maintained responsibility for artillery in the defense of the Korean Demilitarized Zone."

A Chinese commercial airplane was hijacked by six defectors in 1983, who forced the plane to fly over North Korea airspace and landed the airplane safely at Camp Page. "US Officials said the three engine jet, a British Hawker Siddeley Trident, which resembles a Boeing 727, landed at Camp Page, an American military base near Chuncheon. Later, another newspaper reported the fate of the hijackers: "In 1983, six Chinese hijacked a plane to South Korea. They were imprisoned for less than a year and resettled in Taiwan, where they received heroes' welcomes." Another newspaper wrote about the diplomatic aspects of the hijacking. "When six Chinese defectors hijacked a domestic airliner to South Korea last week, they unwittingly initiated a breakthrough in Chinese-South Korean relations. The airliner, a British-built Trident with 105 people on board, was on a scheduled flight from Shenyang in Manchuria to Shanghai. An hour after takeoff, the hijackers shot their way into the cockpit and eventually forced the pilot to land the plane in South Korea. But as the immediate drama of the situation faded, it was replaced by excitement over the longer-term implications of the incident. From the South Korean point of view, better relations with North Korea's main ally could help to lessen tension on the divided peninsula and would considerably strengthen the south's position vis-a-vis North Korea."

The NCO Academy was another function at Camp Page during the mid-'70s.

== Major units ==
Major military units at Camp Page included: 1st. 42 Field Artillery (Honest John Rocket Unit) HSB, A and B Battery's. By far the most personnel on the base.. 1st Battalion, 2nd Aviation. Provided aviation support for the 2nd Infantry Division. Major Robert Young was the Commander of the 1/501 Aviation 17th Aviation Brigade, U.S. Army, Camp Page, Korea, from 1990-1991. Richard Vincent Melnyk was the "Attack platoon leader 1-2 Aviation Regiment, U.S. Army, Camp Page, Korea, 1997."

Active duty personnel in 1998: 700. Civilian: 650. All personnel live on post; most served a one-year unaccompanied tour of duty. Yun Kyong-Ku was a "civil engineer, Deh Camp Page, US Army, Chuncheon, Republic of Korea, from 1989 to 1991."

Commercial activities included a barbershop, convenience store, tailor, Class VI Post Exchange, burger bar, airline ticket office, pizza delivery.

Schools: remote college courses and correspondence programs were offered, although there were no on-base schools.

There was a base library on the post that was operated as a Non-Appropriated Fund Instrumentality (NAFI). Robert Lee Hadden was the "Supervisory librarian, USAG Camp Page, Chuncheon, 1983-1984."

Recreational facilities included a recreation center; pool; tennis courts, craft shop, community club, basketball. Concerning the temporary bowling facility, one report said: "Only one installation (Camp Page) of the forty studied had bowling centers in temporary buildings. The percent permanent factor for the bowling center at Camp Page was 0.00, the other installations had a percent permanent factor of 10.00."

== Base closure ==
Camp Page, near Chuncheon, ROK, was the home of the Apache helicopter unit linked to the 2nd Infantry at the Demilitarized Zone until it was closed in 2005.

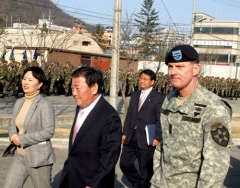
Chuncheon Mayor Yu Chong-Su, second from left, and 2nd ID commander Maj. Gen. George A. Higgins, right, attended Tuesday's ceremony to close Camp Page.

== Pollution concerns ==
There are many concerns about the amount of pollution in the soil and groundwater in Camp Page. "According to the newspaper, the survey showed that soil contamination levels at Camp Page in Chuncheon stood at more than 100 times above the permissible level. Samples from all eight installations tested for ground water pollution revealed toxins that exceeded permissible levels, the newspaper reported... "Camp Page in the city of Chuncheon tops the list for oil leakage pollution among those bases," Kang Sung-min, chief aide to Korean National Assemblyman Kim Hyung-ju, told Stars and Stripes on Thursday."

"Levels of BTEX, a group of four chemicals that make up a large percentage of petroleum products, at Camp Page registered at 1,152 milligrams per kilogram of soil. South Korea's national standards call for "anti-contamination measures" at 200 milligrams per kilogram of soil. Benzene, one of the chemicals in BTEX, is listed by the EPA [ U.S. Environmental Protection Agency ] as a known carcinogen. The EPA's maximum permissible level for benzene in drinking water is 5 parts per billion, or .005 milligrams per liter/kilogram. Total petroleum hydrocarbons, which can include several chemicals, also showed elevated levels. Levels at Camp Page registered 50,552 milligrams per kilogram of soil. Camps Howze, Greaves, Stanton and Garry Owen ranged between 20,767 and 47,819 milligrams per kilogram of soil. South Korea's national standards call for anti-contamination measures at 1,200 milligrams per kilogram of soil, according to Green Korea, which filed a lawsuit against the South Korean government for full release of its base environmental data."

There are also concerns about an undocumented accident with a nuclear-tipped missile accident at the former Camp Page installation. "The online edition of the magazine SisaIN reports that a retired US soldier who served at Camp Page in Chuncheon from 1972 to 1973 is claiming that in summer of 1972, there was an accident involving a nuclear tipped Honest John missile. According to Dallas Snell, who also claimed Agent Orange was buried at Camp Page, his post-lunch R&R was disturbed one day when the base siren went off. About 20—30 men and MPs, including Snell, gathered in the base's nuke silo, and were ordered to take defensive positions around a nuke-tipped Honest John. Something had gone wrong with the warhead, he said, and a helicopter came and transported it out."

There are also concerns about allegations that Agent Orange were buried at the site. "Last week, some retired American soldiers raised a second allegation that Agent Orange was buried at a former U.S. base, Camp Page, in Chuncheon. Camp Page was turned over to South Korea in 2005. "We will open a further investigation on suspicion that the defoliant was buried at Camp Page in Chuncheon," Vice Defense Minister Lee Yong-gul told reporters. "After reviewing other allegations that Agent Orange was buried at other former U.S. military bases, we will consider expanding our investigation if necessary." Ministry officials said the investigation at Camp Page would start as early as next week."

== See also ==
- List of United States Army installations in South Korea

== Bibliography ==
- AIR FORCE ENVIRONMENTAL TECHNICAL APPLICATIONS CENTER SCOTT AFB IL. 1974. Camp Page AAF, Chuncheon, Korea. Revised Uniform Summary of Surface Weather Observations (RUSSWO). Parts A-F. Ft. Belvoir: Defense Technical Information Center. Abstract: This report is a six-part statistical summary of surface weather observations for Camp Page AAF, Chuncheon, Korea. It contains the following parts: (A) Weather Conditions; Atmospheric Phenomena; (B) Precipitation, Snowfall and Snow Depth (daily amounts and extreme values); (C) Surface winds; (D) Ceiling versus Visibility; Sky Cover; (E) Psychrometric Summaries (daily maximum and minimum temperatures, extreme maximum and minimum temperatures, psychrometric summary of wet-bulb temperature depression versus dry-bulb temperature, means and standard deviations of dry-bulb, wet-bulb and dew-point temperatures and relative humidity); and (F) Pressure Summary (means, standard, deviations, and observation counts of station pressure and sea-level pressure). Data in this report are presented in tabular form, in most cases in percentage frequency of occurrence or cumulative percentage frequency of occurrence tables. 452 pages. OCLC Number: 227459393. DTIC Number: ADA088949.
- AIR FORCE ENVIRONMENTAL TECHNICAL APPLICATIONS CENTER SCOTT AFB IL. 1986. Camp Page, South Korea Limited Surface Observations Climatic Summary (LISOCS). Parts A, C-F. Ft. Belvoir: Defense Technical Information Center. Abstract: A statistical data summary of surface weather observation climatology for: Camp Page South Korea. This summary is similar to the Revised Uniform Summary of Surface Weather Observations (RUSSWO), but is based on data collected from limited-duty weather observing stations; i.e., those that take weather observations less than 24 hours a day, 7 days a week. The summary is in five parts: PART A, Weather Conditions and Atmospheric Phenomena; PART C, Surface Winds; PART D, Ceiling and Visibility; PART E, Psychrometric Summaries; and PART F, Pressure Summaries. Note that PART B, Precipitation, is omitted. See USAFETAC/TN-83/001 9AD-A132186), An Aid for Using the Revised Uniform Summary of Surface Weather Observations (RUSSWOs), for complete descriptions of contents and instructions for use. 194 pages. See also Rept. no. USAFETAC/TN-83/001, DTIC Number: ADA132186. OCLC: 227676077.
- Camp Page, South Korea Limited Surface Observations Climatic Summary (LISOCS). Parts A, C-F. Descriptive Note: Data summary rept. Dec 74-Dec 80. Corporate Author: AIR FORCE ENVIRONMENTAL TECHNICAL APPLICATIONS CENTER SCOTT AFB IL. Report Date : 29 APR 1986. Pagination or Media Count: 194. Abstract: A statistical data summary of surface weather observation climatology for: Camp Page South Korea. This summary is similar to the Revised Uniform Summary of Surface Weather Observations (RUSSWO), but is based on data collected from limited-duty weather observing stations; i.e., those that take weather observations less than 24 hours a day, 7 days a week. The summary is in five parts: PART A, Weather Conditions and Atmospheric Phenomena; PART C, Surface Winds; PART D, Ceiling and Visibility; PART E, Psychrometric Summaries; and PART F, Pressure Summaries. Note that PART B, Precipitation, is omitted. See USAFETAC/TN-83/001 9AD-A132186), An Aid for Using the Revised Uniform Summary of Surface Weather Observations (RUSSWOs), for complete descriptions of contents and instructions for use. DTIC Number: ADA167656.
- Grogan, William P. 1994. Airfield pavement evaluation, A-306 (Camp Page), Chuncheon, Korea. Vicksburg, Miss: U.S. Army Engineer Waterways Experiment Station. OCLC Number: 31229552. Notes: "September 1994." Description: 88 pages: ill.; 28 cm. Series Title: Miscellaneous paper (U.S. Army Engineer Waterways Experiment Station), GL-94-39.
- Llopis, José L., and Charles R. Malone. 2001. Geophysical surveys at Camp Eagle and Camp Page, Republic of Korea. [Vicksburg, Miss.]: US Army Corps of Engineers, Engineer Research and Development Center, Geotechnical and Structures Laboratory. 130 p. (various pagings): ill., photos; 28 cm. Series Title: ERDC/GSL TR, 01-14. OCLC Number: 48385567.
- Resor, Stanley R. 1965. Stanley R. Resor photograph collection. Description: 1 box (78 photographs). Other Titles: Photograph collection of Stanley R. Resor. Resor photograph collection. Stanley R. Resor collection. Resor collection. Abstract: Contains the following type(s) of materials: photographs. Covers the following war(s) and/or time period(s): Cold War. General description of the collection: The Stanley R. Resor photograph collection contains photos of five of his many tours to military bases when he was Secretary of the Army. The first shows soldiers in training at Fort Richardson, Alaska in June 1965. The second covers "Blue Chip 9", a public relations oriented exercise at Fort Bragg and Pope Air Force Base, North Carolina on May 3, 1967. The third set are color photos of a trip to Korea between July 28 and August 5, 1968. The fourth show a visit specifically to I Corps artillery units in Korea on August 3, 1968. There are no personal photos and no other subjects covered in this collection. US Army Military History Institute, Carlisle Barraks, PA. Descriptor: Camp Page (Korea) -- Photographs. OCLC Number: 49000709.
