= Anti-Americanism =

Dislike of the United States and Americans

Anti-Americanism (also known as anti-American sentiment) is a term that can describe several sentiments and positions, including opposition to, fear of, distrust of, prejudice against, or hatred toward the United States, its federal government, foreign policy, or culture, or toward Americans in general. Anti-Americanism can be contrasted with American nationalism or pro-Americanism, which refers to support, love, or admiration for the United States.

The political scientist Brendon O'Connor at the United States Studies Centre in Australia suggests that "anti-Americanism" cannot be isolated as a consistent phenomenon, since the term originated as a rough composite of stereotypes, prejudices, and criticisms that evolved into more politically based criticisms. The French scholar Marie-France Toinet says that use of the term "anti-Americanism" is "only fully justified if it implies systematic opposition – a sort of allergic reaction – to America as a whole." Some scholars frequently accused of anti-American biases, such as Noam Chomsky and Nancy Snow, have argued that the application of the term "anti-American" to other countries or their populations is "nonsensical" as it implies that disliking the American government or its policies is socially undesirable or even comparable to a crime. In this regard, the term has been likened to the propagandistic usage of the term "anti-Sovietism" in the Soviet Union.

Discussions on anti-Americanism have, in most cases, lacked a precise explanation of what the sentiment entails (other than a general disfavor), which has led the term to be used broadly and in an impressionistic manner. The author and expatriate William Russell Melton argues that criticism largely originates from the perception that the U.S. wants to act as a "world policeman". Anti-Americanism has also been identified with the term Americanophobia, which Merriam-Webster defines as "hatred of the U.S. or American culture".

Negative, hostile, distrustful, or critical views of the United States, its influence, or the American people have been historically present across numerous regions and countries worldwide. Today, such views are strongest and most widespread in Europe and the Asia-Pacific, including in Belarus, Bosnia and Herzegovina, China, Pakistan, Russia, Serbia, and several countries in the Greater Middle East, including Tunisia and Turkey, but remain low in India, Israel, Vietnam, sub-Saharan Africa (especially Ghana, Kenya, and Nigeria), and numerous countries in central and eastern Europe (especially Albania, Kosovo, Lithuania, Romania, and Ukraine). Additionally, anti-Americanism is present in several Western countries, including Australia, Canada, France, Germany, the Netherlands, Spain, Sweden, and the United Kingdom, as well as in some Latin American countries such as Bolivia, Colombia, Cuba, Mexico, and Venezuela.

== Etymology ==
In the online Oxford Dictionaries, the term "anti-Americanism" is defined as "Hostility to the interests of the United States".

In the first edition of Webster's American Dictionary of the English Language (1828) the term "anti-American" was defined as "opposed to America, or to the true interests or government of the United States; opposed to the revolution in America".

In France, the use of the noun form antiaméricanisme has been cataloged from 1948, entering ordinary political language in the 1950s.

== History ==
=== Background ===
There was Native American opposition and resistance to the European colonization of the Americas in the colonial period before the Thirteen Colonies became the United States. Enslaved Africans also opposed and resisted their forced transport to North America and the institution of slavery in the colonies.

=== 18th and 19th centuries ===
The Haudenosaunee have referred to George Washington and later US presidents as Hanadagá·yas —‘town-destroyer’—for the US assault that razed 40 Haudenosaunee towns during the American Revolutionary War.

==== European Anti-Americanism ====
===== Degeneracy thesis =====
In the mid- to late-eighteenth century, a theory emerged among some European intellectuals which stated that the landmasses of the New World were inherently inferior to that of Europe. Proponents of the so-called "degeneracy thesis" held the view that climatic extremes, humidity, and other atmospheric conditions in America physically weakened both men and animals. The American author James W. Ceaser and the French author Philippe Roger have interpreted this theory as "a kind of prehistory of anti-Americanism" and have (in the words of Philippe Roger) been a historical "constant" since the 18th century, or again an endlessly repetitive "semantic block". Others, like Jean-François Revel, have examined what lay hidden behind this "fashionable" ideology. Purported evidence for the idea included the smallness of American fauna, dogs that ceased to bark, and venomous plants; one theory put forth was that the New World had emerged from the Biblical flood later than the Old World. Native Americans were also held to be feeble, small, and without ardor.

The theory was originally proposed by Comte de Buffon, a leading French naturalist, in his Histoire Naturelle (1766). The French writer Voltaire joined Buffon and others in making the argument. The Dutch philosopher Cornelius de Pauw, court philosopher to Frederick II of Prussia, became its leading proponent. While Buffon focused on the American biological environment, de Pauw attacked the people who were native to the continent. James Ceaser has noted that the denunciation of America as inferior to Europe was partially motivated by the German government's fear of mass emigration; de Pauw was called upon to convince the Germans that the new world was inferior. De Pauw is also known to have influenced the philosopher Immanuel Kant in a similar direction.

De Pauw said that the New World was unfit for human habitation because it was "so ill-favored by nature that all it contains is either degenerate or monstrous". He asserted that, "the earth, full of putrefaction, was flooded with lizards, snakes, serpents, reptiles and insects". Taking a long-term perspective, he announced that he was, "certain that the conquest of the New World...has been the greatest of all misfortunes to befall mankind."

The theory made it easier for its proponents to argue that the natural environment of the United States would prevent it from ever producing a true culture. Echoing de Pauw, the French Encyclopedist Abbé Raynal wrote in 1770, "America has not yet produced a good poet, an able mathematician, one man of genius in a single art or a single science". The theory was debated and rejected by early American thinkers such as Alexander Hamilton, Benjamin Franklin, and Thomas Jefferson; Jefferson, in his Notes on the State of Virginia (1781), provided a detailed rebuttal of de Buffon from a scientific point of view. Hamilton also vigorously rebuked the idea in Federalist No. 11 (1787).

One critic, citing Raynal's ideas, suggests that it was specifically extended to the Thirteen Colonies that would become the United States.

Roger suggests that the idea of degeneracy posited a symbolic, as well as a scientific, America that would evolve beyond the original thesis. He argues that Buffon's ideas formed the root of a "stratification of negative discourses" that has recurred throughout the history of the two countries' relationship (and been matched by persistent Francophobia in the United States).

===== Culture =====
Results of the 2018 Eurobarometer poll of positive views of the United States' influence in the European Union Default-sorted by most negative view.
Country polled	Positive	Negative	Neutral	Difference
Germany	21%	75%	4	-54
Luxembourg	28%	65%	7	-37
Netherlands	32%	67%	1	-35
France	29%	63%	8	-34
Belgium	33%	65%	2	-32
Sweden	37%	61%	2	-24
Denmark	37%	60%	3	-23
Slovenia	39%	57%	4	-18
Finland	40%	56%	4	-16
Austria	42%	54%	4	-12
Malta	32%	43%	25	-11
Spain	40%	51%	9	-11
EU-28	45%	49%	6	-4
United Kingdom	44%	48%	8	-4
Greece	50%	48%	2	2
Ireland	50%	46%	4	4
Slovakia	48%	42%	10	6
Cyprus	51%	43%	6	7
Portugal	50%	41%	9	9
Czech Republic	55%	41%	4	14
Estonia	53%	38%	9	15
Latvia	53%	33%	14	20
Italy	59%	35%	6	24
Bulgaria	60%	32%	8	28
Croatia	67%	31%	2	36
Hungary	68%	26%	6	42
Lithuania	74%	21%	5	53
Romania	78%	15%	7	63
Poland	79%	14%	7	65

According to Brendan O'Connor, some Europeans criticized Americans for lacking "taste, grace and civility," and having a brazen and arrogant character. The British author Frances Trollope observed in her 1832 book Domestic Manners of the Americans that the greatest difference between the English and Americans was "want of refinement", explaining: "that polish[,] which removes the coarser and rougher parts of our nature[,] is unknown and undreamed of" in America. According to one source, her account "succeeded in angering Americans more than any book written by a foreign observer before or since". The English writer Captain Marryat's critical account in his Diary in America, with Remarks on Its Institutions (1839) also proved controversial, especially in Detroit where an effigy of the author, along with his books, was burned. Other writers critical of American culture and manners included the bishop Talleyrand in France and Charles Dickens in England. Dickens' novel Martin Chuzzlewit (1844) is a ferocious satire on American life.

Sources of American resentment are evident following the Revolutions of 1848 and the ensuing European class struggles. In 1869, after a visit to his country of birth, the Swedish immigrant Hans Mattson observed that,

"...the ignorance, prejudice and hatred toward America and everything pertaining to it among the aristocracy, and especially the office holders, was as unpardonable as it was ridiculous. It was claimed by them that all was humbug in America, that it was the paradise of scoundrels, cheats, and rascals, and that nothing good could possibly come out of it."

After seven years in the US, Ernst Skarstedt, a graduate of Lund University and native Swede, returned to Sweden in 1885. He complained that, in upper-class circles, if he "told something about America, it could happen that in reply (he) was informed that this could not possibly be so or that the matter was better understood in Sweden." The dedication of the Statue of Liberty in 1886 solidified The "New Colossus" as a beacon to the "huddled masses" and their rejection of the "storied pomp" of the old world.

Simon Schama observed in 2003: "By the end of the nineteenth century, the stereotype of the ugly American – voracious, preachy, mercenary, and bombastically chauvinist – was firmly in place in Europe". O'Connor suggests that such prejudices were rooted in an idealized image of European refinement and that the notion of high European culture pitted against American vulgarity has not disappeared.

===== Politics and ideology =====
The young United States also faced criticism on political and ideological grounds. Ceaser argues that the Romantic strain of European thought and literature, hostile to the Enlightenment view of reason and obsessed with history and national character, disdained the rationalistic American project. The German poet Nikolaus Lenau commented: "With the expression Bodenlosigkeit (absence of ground), I think I am able to indicate the general character of all American institutions; what we call Fatherland is here only a property insurance scheme". Ceaser argues in his essay that such comments often repurposed the language of degeneracy, and the prejudice came to focus solely on the United States and not Canada nor Mexico. Lenau had immigrated to the United States in 1833 and found that the country did not live up to his ideals, leading him to return to Germany the following year. His experiences in the U.S. were the subject of a novel titled The America-exhaustion (Der Amerika-Müde) (1855) by fellow German Ferdinand Kürnberger.

The nature of American democracy was also questioned. The sentiment was that the country lacked "[a] monarch, aristocracy, strong traditions, official religion, or rigid class system," according to Judy Rubin, and its democracy was attacked by some Europeans in the early nineteenth century as degraded, a travesty, and a failure. The French Revolution, which was loathed by many European conservatives, also implicated the United States and the idea of creating a constitution on abstract and universal principles. That the country was intended to be a bastion of liberty was also seen as fraudulent given that it had been established with slavery. "How is it that we hear the loudest yelps for liberty among the drivers of Negroes?" asked Samuel Johnson in 1775. He famously stated, that "I am willing to love all mankind, except an American".

=== 20th century ===
==== Intellectuals ====
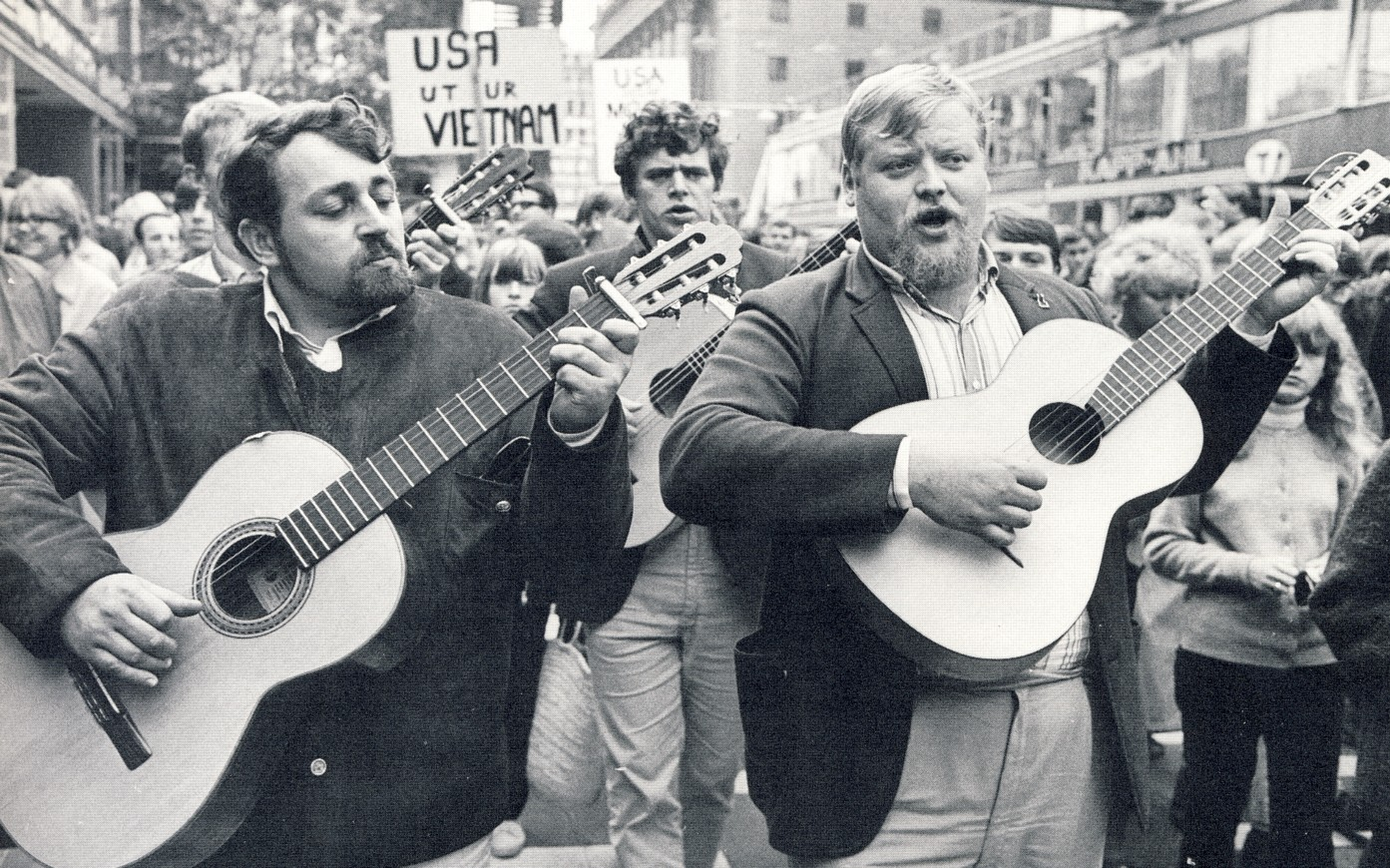
Protest march against the Vietnam War in Stockholm, Sweden, 1965

Sigmund Freud was vehemently anti-American. The historian Peter Gay says that in "slashing away at Americans wholesale, quite indiscriminately, with imaginative ferocity, Freud was ventilating some inner need". Gay suggests that Freud's anti-Americanism was not really about the United States at all.

Numerous authors went on the attack. The French writer Louis-Ferdinand Celine denounced the United States. The German poet Rainer Marie Rilke wrote, "I no longer love Paris, partly because it is disfiguring and Americanizing itself".

==== Communist critiques ====
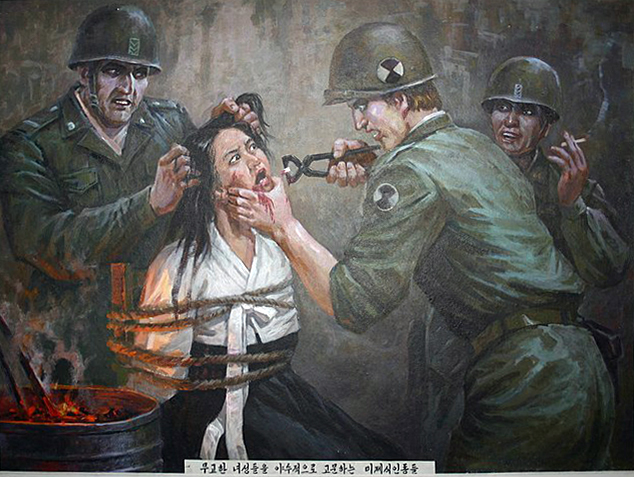
An anti-American mural on display at the Sinchon Museum of American War Atrocities in North Korea depicts the torture of a North Korean woman by American soldiers during the Korean War.

Until its demise in 1991, the Soviet Union and other communist nations emphasized capitalism as the great enemy of communism, and identified the United States as the leader of capitalism. They sponsored anti-Americanism among followers and sympathizers. Russell A. Berman notes that in the mid-19th century, "Marx himself largely admired the dynamism of American capitalism and democracy and did not participate in the anti-Americanism that came to be the hallmark of Communist ideology in the twentieth century". O'Connor argues that, "communism represented the starkest version of anti-Americanism – a coherent world view that challenged the free market, private property, limited government, and individualism". The USA was and is heavily criticised by contemporary socialist nations and movements for imperialism, especially as a reaction to United States involvement in regime change. In the DPRK, for example, anti-Americanism comes not only from ideological opposition to the USA and its actions, but also as a result of allegations of biological warfare in the Korean War and bombing of North Korea.

Authors in the West, such as Bertolt Brecht and Jean-Paul Sartre, criticized the U.S. and reached a large audience, especially on the left. In his Anti-Americanism (2003), the French writer Jean François Revel argues that anti-Americanism emerges primarily from anti-capitalism, and this critique also comes from non-communist, totalitarian regimes.

America was criticised and denounced by Communists such as Mirsaid Sultan-Galiev during the Russian Civil War. Galiev particularly emphasised native genocide of America and the institution of slavery. American treatment of minority groups such as natives and African-Americans would go on to be a continued point of opposition and criticism to the USA throughout the 20th century.

The East German regime imposed an official anti-American ideology that was reflected in all its media and all the schools. Anyone who expressed support for the West would be investigated by the Stasi. The official line followed Vladimir Lenin's theory of imperialism as the highest and last stage of capitalism, and in Dimitrov's theory of fascism as the dictatorship of the most reactionary elements of financial capitalism. The official party line stated that the United States had caused the breakup of the coalition against Adolf Hitler. It was now the bulwark of reaction worldwide, with a heavy reliance on warmongering for the benefit of the "terrorist international of murderers on Wall Street". East Germans were told they had a heroic role to play as a front-line against the Americans. However, Western media outlets such as the American Radio Free Europe broadcasts, and West German media may have limited anti-Americanism. The official communist media ridiculed the modernism and cosmopolitanism of American culture, and denigrated the features of the American way of life, especially jazz music and rock and roll.

==== Fascist critiques ====
Drawing on the ideas of Arthur de Gobineau (1816–1882), European fascists decried the supposed degenerating effect of immigration on the racial mix of the American population. The Nazi ideologist Alfred Rosenberg argued that race mixture in the United States made it inferior to racially pure nations.

Antisemitism was another factor in these critiques. The view that the U.S. was controlled by a Jewish conspiracy through a Jewish lobby was common in countries ruled by fascists before and during World War II. Jews, the assumed puppet masters behind supposed American plans for world domination, were also seen as using jazz in a crafty plan to eliminate racial distinctions; Adolf Hitler dismissed the threat of the United States as a credible enemy of Germany because of its incoherent racial mix; he saw Americans as a "mongrel race", "half-Judaized" and "half-Negrified".

In an address to the Reichstag on 11 December 1941, Hitler declared war on the United States and lambasted U.S. President Franklin D. Roosevelt:

He [Roosevelt] was strengthened in this [political diversion] by the circle of Jews surrounding him, who, with Old Testament-like fanaticism, believe that the United States can be the instrument for preparing another Purim for the European nations that are becoming increasingly anti-Semitic. It was the Jew, in his full Satanic vileness, who rallied around this man [Roosevelt], but to whom this man also reached out.

In 1944, amid Germany's deteriorating military situation, the Schutzstaffel published a virulent article in their weekly Das Schwarze Korps titled "Danger of Americanism" which criticized and characterized the American entertainment industry, as it was thought to be owned by the Jews: "Americanism is a splendid method of depoliticization. The Jews have used jazz and movies, magazines and smut, gangsterism and free love, and every perverse desire, to keep the American people so distracted that they pay no attention to their own fate".

===== "Liberators" poster =====
A 1944 Nazi Germany propaganda poster aimed at the Dutch, from a Norwegian World War II poster by Harald Damsleth

The "Liberators" poster that was distributed by the Nazis to a Dutch audience in 1944 displays multiple elements of anti-American attitudes promoted by the Nazis. The title Liberators refers to a common Allied justification for attacking Germany (and possibly the American B-24 Liberator bombers as well), and the poster depicts this "liberation" as the destruction of European cities. The artist was Harald Damsleth, a Norwegian who worked for the NS in occupied Norway.

Motifs contained in this poster include:

- The decadence of beauty pageants (scantily-clad "Miss America" and "Miss Victory", "The World's Most Beautiful Leg") – or more generally, the putative sexual laxness of American women. The "Miss America" beauty pageant in Atlantic City had expanded during the war and was used to sell war bonds.
- Gangsterism and gun violence (the arm of an escaped convict holding a submachine gun). Gangsterism had become a theme of anti-Americanism in the 1930s.
- Anti-black violence (a lynching noose, a Ku Klux Klan hood). The lynching of blacks had attracted European denunciations by the 1890s.
- General violence of American society, in addition to the above (boxing-glove which grasps the money-bag). The theme of a violent American frontier was well known in the 19th century.
- Americans as Indian savages and as a mockery of American genocide over Natives, as well as land theft, since it is a chieftain symbol here used as a fashion trinket. ("Miss America" wears plains-Indian head-dress).
- The capitalism, pure materialism and commercialism of America, to the detriment of any spirit or soul (money bag with "$" symbol). The materialism of America contrasted with the spiritual depth of European high culture is a common trope, especially in Scandinavia.
- Anti-semitism appears in most Nazi-generated images of America. A Jewish banker is seen behind the money.
- The presence of blacks in America equals its "mongrelization", adding undesirably "primitive" elements to American popular culture, and constituting a potential danger to the white race (a stereotypically caricatured black couple dancing the "Jitterbug – Triumph of Civilization" in birdcage, which is portrayed as a degraded animalistic ritual). The degradation of culture, especially through miscegenation, resonated with European anxieties, especially in Germany.
- Decadence of American popular culture, and its pernicious influence on the rest of the world (dancing of jitterbug, hand holds phonograph record, figure of a European gullible "all-ears" dupe in lower foreground). The growing popularity of American music and dancing among young people had ignited a "moral panic" among conservative Europeans.
- Indiscriminate U.S. military violence (bloodied bomb for foot, metal legs, military aircraft wings), threatening the European cultural landmarks at lower right.
  - Hence the suggested falsity of American claims to be "Liberators" (the Liberator was also the name of a U.S. bomber plane).
- Nazis denounced American jingoism and war fervor (a business-suited arm literally "beating the drum" of militarism, "Miss Victory" and her drum-majorette cap and boots).
- The malevolent influence of American Freemasons (Masonic apron descending from drum) was a theme among conservative Catholics, as in Spain.
- Demonization of national symbols of the United States ("Miss Victory" waves the reverse side of 48-star U.S. flag, and the WW2-era Army Air Corps roundel – of small red disk within white star on large blue disk – is shown on one of the wings).

=== 21st century ===
==== September 11 attacks ====
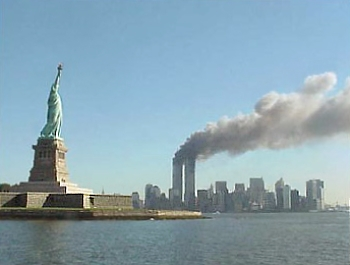
The World Trade Center in New York City (pictured) and the U.S. Department of Defense Headquarters were among the targets attacked on September 11, 2001.

In a book called The Rise of Anti-Americanism, published in 2006, Brendon O'Connor and Martin Griffiths said that the September 11 attacks were "quintessential anti-American acts, which satisfy all of the competing definitions of Anti-Americanism". They ask, "If 9/11 can be construed as the exemplar of anti-Americanism at work, does it make much sense to imply that all anti-Americans are complicit with terrorism?" Most leaders in Islamic countries, including Afghanistan, condemned the attacks. Saddam Hussein's Ba'athist Iraq was a notable exception, with an immediate official statement that "the American cowboys are reaping the fruit of their crimes against humanity".

Europe was highly sympathetic to the United States after the 9/11 attacks. NATO unanimously supported the United States, treating an attack on the U.S. as an attack on all of them after Article 5 of the NATO treaty was invoked for the very first time in its history. NATO and American troops entered Afghanistan shortly after the attacks. When the United States decided to invade and overthrow the Iraqi regime in 2003, it won some support in Europe, especially from the British government, but also intense opposition, led by the German and French governments. Konrad Jarausch argues that there was still fundamental agreement on such basic issues of support for democracy and human rights. However, there emerged a growing gap between an American "libertarian, individualistic, market outlook, and the more statist, collectivist, welfare mentality in Europe."

==== U.S. computer technology ====
A growing dimension of anti-Americanism is fear of the pervasiveness of U.S. Internet technology. This can be traced from the very first computers, which were either British (Colossus) or German (Z1) through to the World Wide Web itself (invented by Englishman Tim Berners-Lee). In all these cases, the U.S. has commercialized all these innovations.

Americanization has advanced through widespread high speed Internet and smartphone technology since 2008, and a large fraction of the new apps and hardware were designed in the United States. In Europe, there is growing concern about excessive Americanization through Google, Facebook, Twitter, Apple, and Uber, among many other U.S. Internet-based corporations. European governments have increasingly expressed concern regarding privacy issues, as well as antitrust and taxation issues regarding the new American giants. There is fear that they are significantly evading taxes, and posting information that may violate European privacy laws. The Wall Street Journal in 2015 reported "deep concerns in Europe's highest policy circles about the power of U.S. technology companies."

==== Mitigation of anti-Americanism ====
Sometimes developments help neutralize anti-Americanism. In 2015, the United States Department of Justice went on the attack against corruption at FIFA, arresting many top world soccer leaders long suspected of bribery and corruption. In this case, the U.S. government's self-defined role as "policeman of the world" won widespread international support.

==== Second Trump administration ====
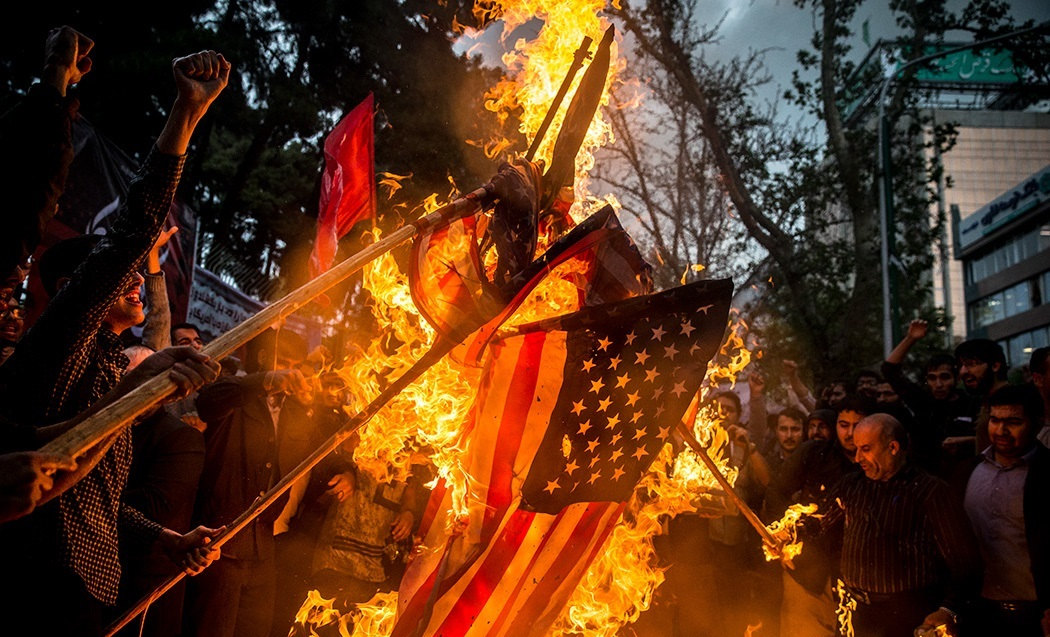
Protesters burn American flags after the US decision to withdraw from the Joint Comprehensive Plan of Action in front of the former US embassy in Tehran.

President Trump's suggestion that Canada should become "America's 51st state" sparked widespread anger among Canadians. After Donald Trump imposed tariffs on all imports from Canada and Mexico in 2025, anti-Americanism rose further in Canada as the tariffs harmed historically strong Canada-U.S. relations. In the days after the initial tariff announcements, Canadian crowds booed the U.S. national anthem at sporting events featuring American teams. Many Canadians began a boycott of American goods and of travel to the United States and a "Buy Canadian" movement gained traction across the country.

Trump also asserted that the United States should take over Greenland, citing reasons of "national security" and "freedom throughout the world". In response, Greenlandic premier Múte Bourup Egede wrote: "Greenland is ours. We are not for sale and will never be for sale. We must not lose our long struggle for freedom". Denmark's PM Mette Frederiksen repeated her comments from 2019. Danish minister of defense Troels Lund Poulsen, following Trump's comments, announced an increase in spending on defense in Greenland of a "double-digit billion amount" in Krone (between $876mn and $8.7bn USD). Danish King Frederik X rebuked Trump's claims over Greenland, when he stated, "We are all united and each of us committed for the kingdom of Denmark, from the Danish minority in South Schleswig and all the way to Greenland. We belong together". This resulted a poll of 497 adult residents of Greenland between 22 and 26 January 2025, made by Verian for the national Greenlandic newspaper Sermitsiaq and the national Danish newspaper Berlingske which 85% of respondents rejected a proposition that Greenland should leave the Danish Realm to become part of the United States, whereas 6% supported the proposition and 9% were undecided. In the same poll, when asked whether they would prefer a Danish or an American citizenship, 55% preferred a Danish one and 8% an American one, whereas 37% were undecided.

The contentious 2025 Trump–Zelenskyy Oval Office meeting in the White House in February 2025 between Trump and Ukrainian President Volodymyr Zelenskyy, described by critics as humiliating for Zelenskyy, fueled European discontent regarding the administration's approach to the Russo-Ukrainian war. Increased detentions of Canadian and European tourists at the USA border led several countries, including Germany, the UK, Denmark, Finland, and Portugal, to issue travel warnings for the United States.

Trump's policies and actions have led to a significant surge of anti-American sentiments across Europe. In Denmark, approximately 50% of consumers reported deliberately refraining from buying United States products since Trump's inauguration, according to a Megafon survey for TV 2. Swedish polls indicated that 70% of Swedes had considered or actively participated in boycotting United States products, with 10% having boycotted all USA goods completely. Facebook groups promoting the boycott gained significant membership: a Swedish group called "Bojkotta varor från USA" (Boycott goods from the USA) attracted around 80,000 members, while a Danish equivalent, "Boykot varer fra USA," amassed over 90,000 members. In France, a group called "BOYCOTT USA: Achetez Français et Européen!" (BOYCOTT USA: Buy French and European!) gathered approximately 30,000 members.

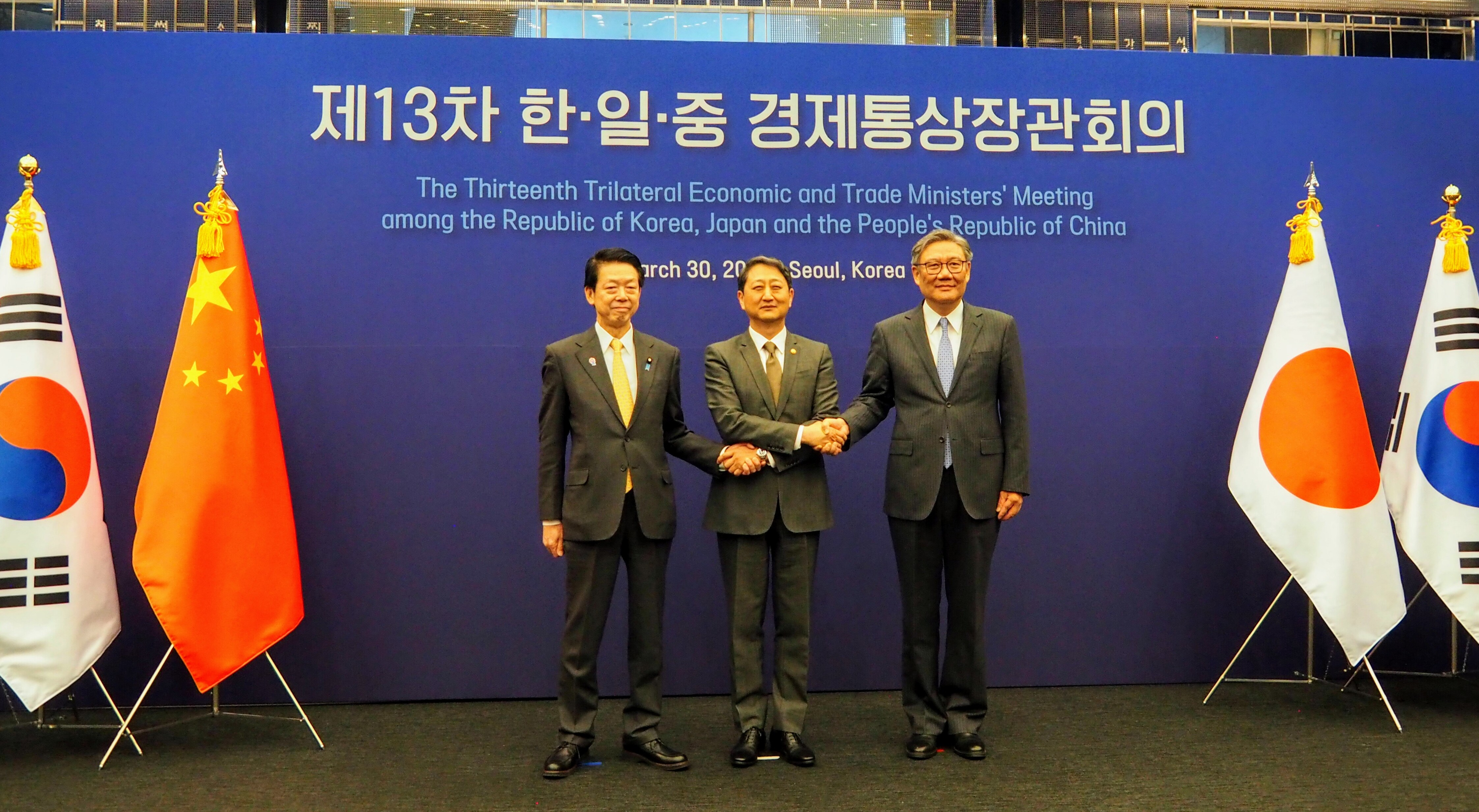
China, South Korea, and Japan agreed to strengthen free trade in the face of Trump tariffs on March 30, 2025.

After Trump initially imposed tariff on all imports from China, China retaliated by imposing a 15% tariff on US chicken, wheat, corn, and cotton, as well as a 10% tariff on US sorghum, soybeans, pork, beef, aquatic products, fruits, vegetables, and dairy products, effective 10 March 2025. China also launched an anti-circumvention investigation into optical fiber products imported from the United States. The General Administration of Customs of China suspended US lumber imports and revoked soybean import licenses for three US firms. On 30 March 2025, China, South Korea, and Japan's trade ministers met for the first time in five years. The officials discussed goals for a trilateral free trade agreement and enhanced supply-chain cooperation in response to Trump tariffs.

After Trump announced the tariffs on 2 April, the Chinese government retaliated with tariffs of 34% on all imports from the United States, effective 10 April 2025, and suspended negotiations regarding the sale of TikTok. China also began requiring special licenses to export six heavy rare-earths, 100% of which were refined in China, and rare-earth magnets, 90% of which are produced in China. The rare earths, difficult to substitute, are critical to a range of high-tech goods, including batteries, weapons, and medical devices. After retaliating each other several times, the Commerce ministry stated, "Even if the U.S. continues to impose higher tariffs, it will no longer make economic sense and will become a joke in the history of world economy." China has targeted American red states using its non-tariff barriers. US' threats to further rise tariffs up to 245% were dismissed by China’s Ministry of Foreign Affairs, claiming that "it would not pay attention to Trump's 'tariff numbers game".

== Rationale ==
Bradley Bowman, a former professor at the United States Military Academy, argues that United States military facilities overseas and the forces stationed there serve as a "major catalyst for anti-Americanism and radicalization."

Other studies have found a link between the presence of the US bases and al-Qaeda recruitment. These bases are often cited by opponents of repressive governments to provoke anger, protest, and nationalistic fervor against the ruling class and the United States. This, in turn, according to sociologist JoAnn Chirico, raises concerns in Washington that a democratic transition could lead to the closure of bases, which often encourages the United States to extend its support for authoritarian leaders. This study suggests that the outcome could be an intensifying cycle of protest and repression supported by the United States. In 1958, US President Dwight D. Eisenhower discussed with his staff what he described as a "campaign of hatred against us" in the Arab world, "not by the governments but by the people."

The United States National Security Council, concluded that was due to a perception that the U.S. supports corrupt and brutal governments and opposes political and economic development "to protect its interest in Near East oil". The Wall Street Journal reached a similar conclusion after surveying the views of wealthy and Western Muslims after September 11 attacks. In this vein, the head of the Council of Foreign Relations terrorism program believes that the American support for repressive regimes such as Egypt and Saudi Arabia is undoubtedly a major factor in anti-American sentiment in the Arab world.

== Interpretations ==
Results of 2026 Pew Research Center poll "% who have a(n) favorable/unfavorable opinion of the United States" (default-sorted by decreasing negativity of each country)
Country polled	Favorable	Unfavorable	Difference
West Bank	9%	81%	-72
Turkey	13%	84%	-71
Pakistan	15%	81%	-66
Sweden	19%	80%	-61
Malaysia	19%	80%	-61
Australia	24%	76%	-52
Netherlands	25%	71%	-46
Spain	30%	67%	-37
Germany	27%	71%	-44
France	27%	70%	-43
Indonesia	29%	70%	-41
Italy	31%	69%	-38
Bangladesh	26%	63%	-37
Canada	33%	66%	-33
Singapore	34%	66%	-32
Thailand	36%	63%	-27
Greece	37%	60%	-23
South Africa	35%	55%	-20
United Kingdom	41%	58%	-17
Chile	37%	53%	-16
Mexico	40%	55%	-15
South Korea	45%	55%	-10
Japan	50%	50%	0
Argentina	44%	44%	0
Sri Lanka	42%	40%	+2
Brazil	47%	43%	+4
Poland	49%	43%	+6
Peru	51%	38%	+13
India	45%	31%	+14
Philippines	56%	41%	+15
Hungary	58%	38%	+20
Colombia	60%	35%	+25
Kenya	63%	35%	+28
Nigeria	63%	32%	+31
Ghana	68%	22%	+46
Israel	81%	19%	+62

Results of 2026 Morning Consult poll "Do you have a favorable or unfavorable view of the U.S.?" (default-sorted by decreasing favorable view in each country; numbers do not add to 100% due to some respondents saying they did not understand)
Country polled	Positive	Negative	Don't know	Difference
Israel	83%	10%	6%	+73
Nigeria	82%	10%	7%	+59
Morocco	68%	19%	11%	+49
Vietnam	64%	20%	11%	+44
Peru	64%	22%	6%	+42
India	62%	28%	8%	+34
Pakistan	61%	22%	11%	+39
Philippines	61%	25%	11%	+36
Argentina	58%	28%	7%	+30
Colombia	57%	29%	6%	+28
Romania	57%	24%	15%	+33
Chile	57%	30%	8%	+27
Algeria	56%	25%	17%	+31
United Arab Emirates	55%	31%	12%	+24
Poland	55%	29%	14%	+26
Brazil	54%	33%	12%	+21
South Africa	53%	35%	10%	+18
Egypt	48%	39%	17%	+9
Indonesia	45%	39%	13%	+6
Saudi Arabia	45%	35%	17%	+10
Mexico	43%	42%	9%	+1
South Korea	42%	46%	10%	-4
Spain	39%	47%	8%	-8
United Kingdom	39%	48%	12%	-9
Australia	38%	49%	11%	-11
Malaysia	38%	44%	16%	-6
Russia	37%	41%	19%	-4
Thailand	37%	32%	29%	+5
Japan	36%	41%	22%	-5
Ireland	35%	57%	8%	-22
Czech Republic	34%	51%	11%	-17
Italy	34%	51%	11%	-17
Singapore	33%	55%	11%	-22
Turkey	32%	49%	16%	-17
Austria	31%	62%	6%	-31
Switzerland	30%	60%	7%	-30
China	30%	36%	19%	-6
France	30%	50%	15%	-20
Germany	28%	58%	13%	-30
Norway	25%	72%	3%	-47
Canada	24%	66%	8%	-42
Sweden	23%	69%	7%	-46
Belgium	22%	64%	11%	-44
Netherlands	21%	66%	11%	-45

In a poll conducted in 2017 by the BBC World Service of 19 countries, four of the countries rated U.S. influence positively, while 14 leaned negatively, and one was divided.

Anti-Americanism had risen in the late 2010s in Canada, Latin America, the Middle East, and the European Union, due in part to the strong worldwide unpopularity of the first Donald Trump administration's policies, though anti-Americanism is noted to be low in numerous countries of central and eastern Europe due to stronger anti-communist sentiment amongst numerous former Warsaw Pact satellite states of the Soviet Union and strong support for joining and remaining within the NATO alliance. Following the 2020 election of Joe Biden as the new US president, overall global views of the United States returned to being positive overall once more.

Interpretations of anti-Americanism have often been polarized. Anti-Americanism has been described by the Hungarian-born American sociologist Paul Hollander as "a relentless critical impulse toward American social, economic, and political institutions, traditions, and values".

The German newspaper publisher and political scientist Josef Joffe suggests five classic aspects of the phenomenon: reducing Americans to stereotypes, believing the United States to have an irredeemably evil nature, ascribing to the U.S. establishment a vast conspiratorial power aimed at utterly dominating the globe, holding the U.S. responsible for all the evils in the world, and seeking to limit the influence of the U.S. by destroying it or by cutting oneself and one's society off from its polluting products and practices. Other advocates of the significance of the term argue that anti-Americanism represents a coherent and dangerous ideological current, comparable to antisemitism. Anti-Americanism has also been described as an attempt to frame the consequences of U.S. foreign policy choices as evidence of a specifically American moral failure, as opposed to what may be unavoidable failures of a complicated foreign policy that comes with superpower status.

The term status as an "-ism" has been a greatly contested subject, however. Brendon O'Connor notes that studies of the topic have been "patchy and impressionistic," and consisting of one-sided attacks characterizing anti-Americanism as an irrational position. The American academic Noam Chomsky, a prolific critic of the U.S. and its policies, asserts that the use of the term within the U.S. has parallels with methods employed by totalitarian states or military dictatorships; he compares the term to "anti-Sovietism", a label used by the Kremlin to suppress dissident or critical thought, for instance.

Chomsky explained his views in an interview in 2002:

The concept "anti-American" is an interesting one. The counterpart is used only in totalitarian states or military dictatorships. ... Thus, in the old Soviet Union, dissidents were condemned as "anti-Soviet". That's a natural usage among people with deeply rooted totalitarian instincts, which identify state policy with the society, the people, the culture. In contrast, people with even the slightest concept of democracy treat such notions with ridicule and contempt.

Some have attempted to recognize both positions. French academic Pierre Guerlain has argued that the term represents two very different tendencies: "One systematic or essentialist, which is a form of prejudice targeting all Americans. The other refers to the way criticisms of the United States are labeled 'anti-American' by supporters of U.S. policies in an ideological bid to discredit their opponents". Guerlain argues that these two "ideal types" of anti-Americanism can sometimes merge, thus making discussion of the phenomenon particularly difficult. Other scholars have suggested that a plural of anti-Americanisms, specific to country and time period, more accurately describe the phenomenon than any broad generalization. The widely used "anti-American sentiment", meanwhile, less explicitly implies an ideology or belief system.

Globally, increases in perceived anti-American attitudes appear to correlate with particular policies or actions, such as the Vietnam and Iraq wars. For this reason, critics sometimes argue the label is a propaganda term that is used to dismiss any censure of the United States as irrational. American historian Max Paul Friedman has written that throughout American history the term has been misused to stifle domestic dissent and delegitimize any foreign criticism. According to an analysis by German historian Darius Harwardt, the term is nowadays mostly used to stifle debate by attempting to discredit viewpoints that oppose American policies.

== Regional anti-Americanism ==
Public opinion on the US (2026): > -40 -40 to -20 -20 to -5 -4 to +4 +5 to +20 +20 to +34 +35 to +49 +50 to +64 > +65

=== Europe ===
Polls conducted in 2003 have shown that anti-Americanism increased in Europe due to the Iraq War, perception of U.S. power, its policies, and leadership. Eurobarometer survey conducted in 2003 among European Union countries revealed that Europeans view America as a higher risk to Global Peace than Iran and North Korea. After Trump imposed tariffs on 2 April 2025, anti-Americanism rose further across Europe.

==== Eastern Europe ====
===== Russia =====
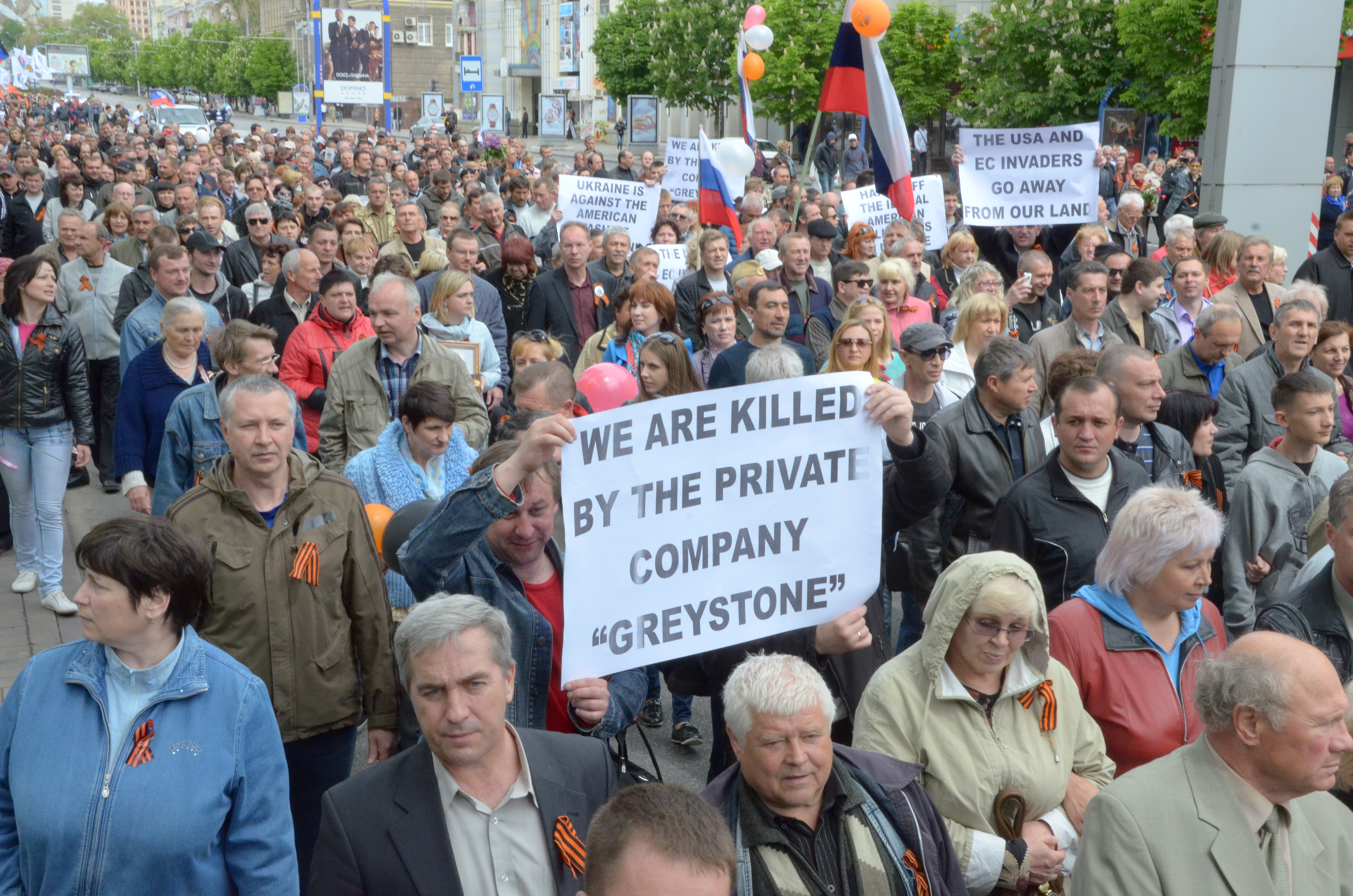
Anti-American slogans during Victory Day in Russian-occupied Donetsk, Ukraine, on 9 May 2014

Russia has a long history of anti-Americanism, dating back to the Bolshevik Revolution of 1917. As early as 1919, the leader of the Soviet Russia, Vladimir Lenin, was recorded addressing Red Army soldiers, where he claimed that "capitalists of England, France, and America are waging war against Russia". The image of Uncle Sam was also used by the Bolsheviks to portray White Russian forces as foreign-sponsored.

In 2013, 30% of Russians had a "very unfavorable" or "somewhat unfavorable" view of Americans, and 40% viewed the U.S. in a "very unfavorable" or "somewhat unfavorable" light, up from 34% in 2012. By 2020, 71% of Russians had at least a somewhat negative attitude toward the U.S., up from 38% in 2013, according to a Levada Center survey. It is the largest figure since the collapse of the USSR. In 2015, a new poll by the Levada center showed that 81% of Russians now hold unfavorable views of the United States, presumably as a result of U.S. and international sanctions imposed against Russia because of the Russo-Ukrainian war. Anti-Americanism in Russia is reportedly at its highest since the end of the Cold War. A December 2017 survey conducted by the Chicago Council and its Russian partner, the Levada Center, showed that 78% of "Russians polled said the United States meddles "a great deal" or "a fair amount" in Russian politics", only 24% of Russians say they hold a positive view of the United States, and 81% of "Russians said they felt the United States was working to undermine Russia on the world stage."

Survey results published by the Levada Center indicate that, as of August 2018, Russians increasingly viewed the United States positively following the Russia–U.S. summit in Helsinki in July 2018. The Moscow Times reported that "For the first time since 2014, the number of Russians who said they had "positive" feelings towards the United States (42 percent) outweighed those who reported "negative" feelings (40 percent)." In February 2020, 46% of Russians polled said they had a negative view of the United States. According to the Pew Research Center, "57% of Russians ages 18 to 29 see the U.S. favorably, compared with only 15% of Russians ages 50 and older." In 2019, only 20% of Russians viewed U.S. President Donald Trump positively. Only 14% of Russians expressed net approval of Donald Trump's policies.

==== Western Europe ====
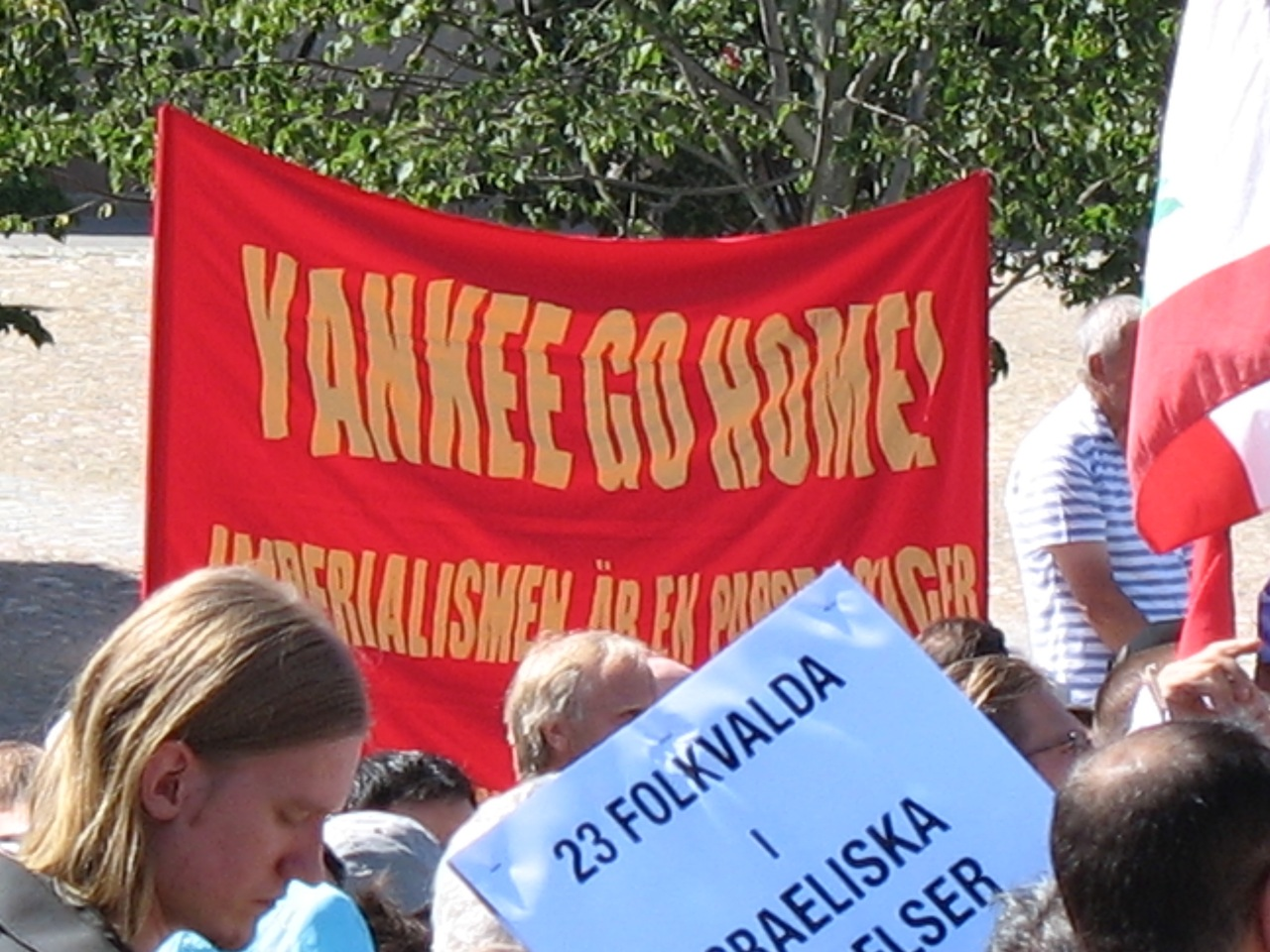
Banner expressing anti-American sentiments in Stockholm, 2006

In a 2003 article, historian David Ellwood identified what he called three great roots of anti-Americanism:

- Representations, images, and stereotypes (from the birth of the Republic onwards)
- The challenge of economic power and the American model of modernization (principally from the 1910s and 1920s on)
- The organized projection of U.S. political, strategic, and ideological power (from World War II on)

He went on to say that expressions of the phenomenon in the last 60 years have contained ever-changing combinations of these elements, the configurations depending on internal crises within the groups or societies articulating them as much as anything done by American society in all its forms.

In 2004, Sergio Fabbrini wrote that the perceived post-9/11 unilateralism of the 2003 U.S.-led invasion of Iraq fed deep-rooted anti-American feeling in Europe, bringing it to the surface. In his article, he highlighted European fears surrounding the Americanization of the economy, culture, and political process of Europe. Fabbrini in 2011 identified a cycle in anti-Americanism: modest in the 1990s, it grew explosively between 2003 and 2008, then declined after 2008. He sees the current version as related to images of American foreign policy-making as unrestrained by international institutions or world opinion. Thus, it is the unilateral policy process and the arrogance of policy makers, not the specific policy decisions, that are decisive.

During the George W. Bush administration, public opinion of America declined in most European countries. A Pew Research Center Global Attitudes Project poll showed "favorable opinions" of America between 2000 and 2006 dropping from 83% to 56% in the United Kingdom, from 62% to 39% in France, from 78% to 37% in Germany and from 50% to 23% in Spain. In Spain, unfavorable views of Americans rose from 30% in 2005 to 51% in 2006 and positive views of Americans dropped from 56% in 2005 to 37% in 2006.

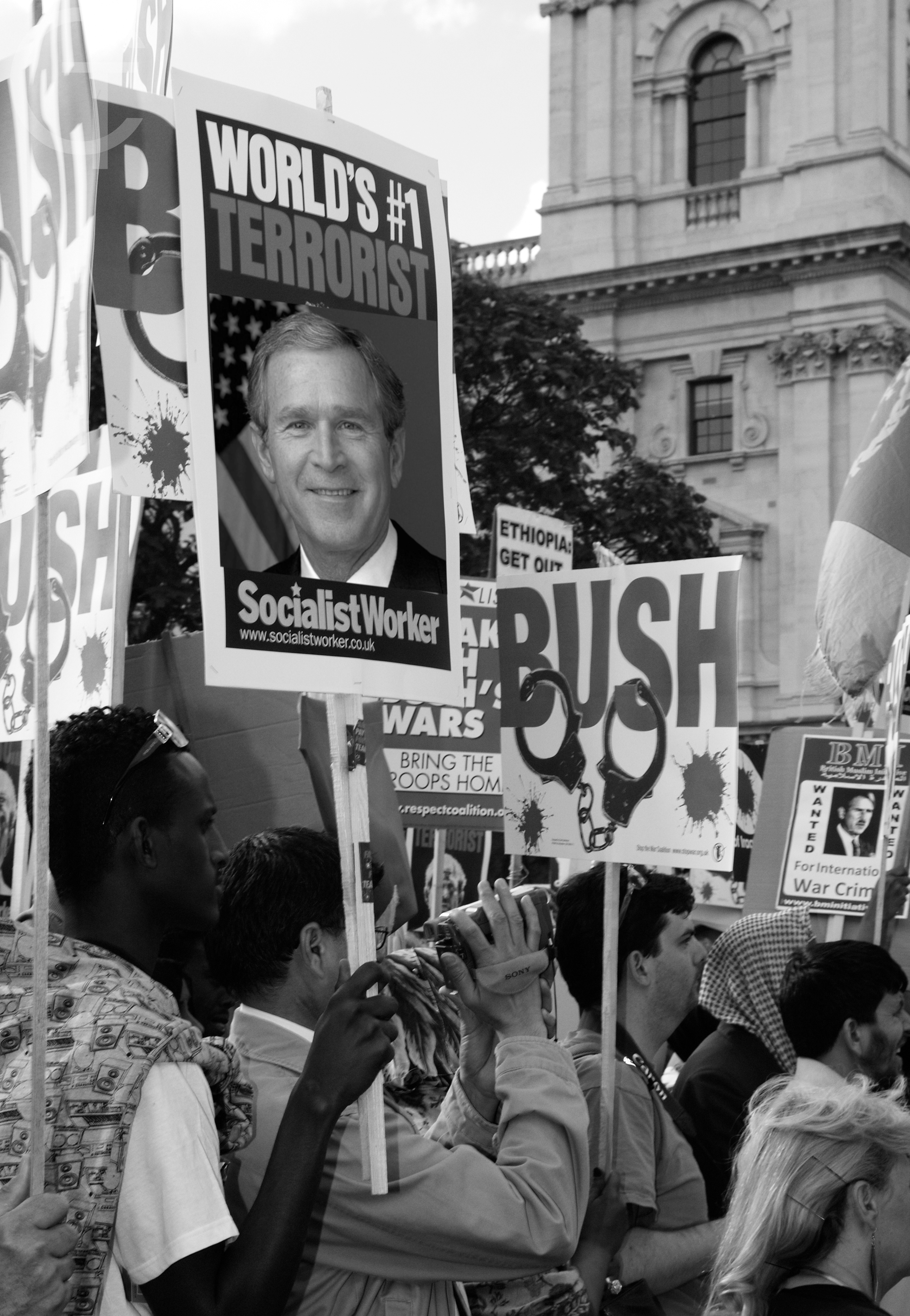
Anti-war demonstration against a visit by George W. Bush to London in 2008

In Europe in 2002, vandalism of American companies was reported in Athens, Zürich, Tbilisi, Moscow and elsewhere. In Venice, 8 to 10 masked individuals claiming to be anti-globalists attacked a McDonald's restaurant. In Athens, at the demonstrations commemorating the 17 November Uprising there was a march toward the U.S. embassy to emphasize the U.S. backing of the Greek military junta of 1967–1974 attended by many people each year.

Ruth Hatlapa, a PhD candidate at the University of Augsburg, and Andrei S. Markovits, a professor of Political Science at the University of Michigan, describe President Obama's image as that of an angel – or more precisely, a rock star – in Europe in contrast to Bush's devilish image there; they argue, however, that "Obamamania" masks a deep-seated distrust and disdain of America.

According to a March 2025 report by YouGov, Western European attitudes towards the US have become more negative since Trump's re-election. The US is now viewed negatively by more than half of the people in Britain (53%), Germany (56%), Sweden (63%), and Denmark (74%).

===== France =====
In France, the term "Anglo-Saxon" is often used in expressions of anti-Americanism or Anglophobia. French writers have also used it in more nuanced ways in discussions about French decline, especially as an alternative model to which France should aspire, how France should adjust to its two most prominent global competitors, how it should deal with social and economic modernization, and how the American Revolution and the subsequent French Revolution were interrelated. According to Robert Stam and Ella Shohat, "For many French people, the United States calls to mind savage capitalism, rampant individualism, phobic Puritanism, imperialism, and anti-intellectualism. For the French left, the United States is also seen as orchestrating the globalization that imposes the English language, Hollywood blockbusters, and Big Macs on a reluctant world."

The First Indochina War in Indochina and the Suez Crisis of 1956 caused dismay among the French right, which was already angered by the lack of American support during Dien Bien Phu in 1954. For the Socialists and Communists of the French left, it was the Vietnam War and U.S. imperialism that were the sources of resentment. Much later, the alleged weapons of mass destruction in Iraq affair further dirtied the previously favorable image. In 2008, 85% of the French people considered the American government and banks to be most liable for the 2008 financial crisis.

Sophie Meunier contends that although it has a long history (older than the U.S. itself) and is the most easily recognizable anti-Americanism in Europe, it may not have had real policy consequences on the United States and thus may have been less damaging than more pernicious and invisible anti-Americanism in other countries.

In 2025, 59% in France viewed the U.S. in a "very unfavorable" or "somewhat unfavorable" light.

Richard Kuisel, an American scholar, has explored how France partly embraced American consumerism while rejecting much of American power and values. He wrote in 2013 that:

America functioned as the "other" in configuring French identity. To be French was not to be American. Americans were conformists, materialists, racists, violent, and vulgar. The French were individualists, idealists, tolerant, and civilized. Americans adored wealth; the French worshiped [sic] la douceur de vivre. This caricature of America, which was already broadly endorsed at the beginning of the century, served to reinforce French national identity. At the end of the twentieth century, the French strategy [was to use] America as a foil, as a way of defining themselves as well as everything from their social policies to their notion of what constituted culture.

In October 2016, French President François Hollande said: "When the (European) Commission goes after Google or digital giants which do not pay the taxes they should in Europe, America takes offence. And yet, they quite shamelessly demand 8 billion from BNP or 5 billion from Deutsche Bank." French bank BNP Paribas was fined in 2014 for violating U.S. sanctions against Iran.

===== Germany =====
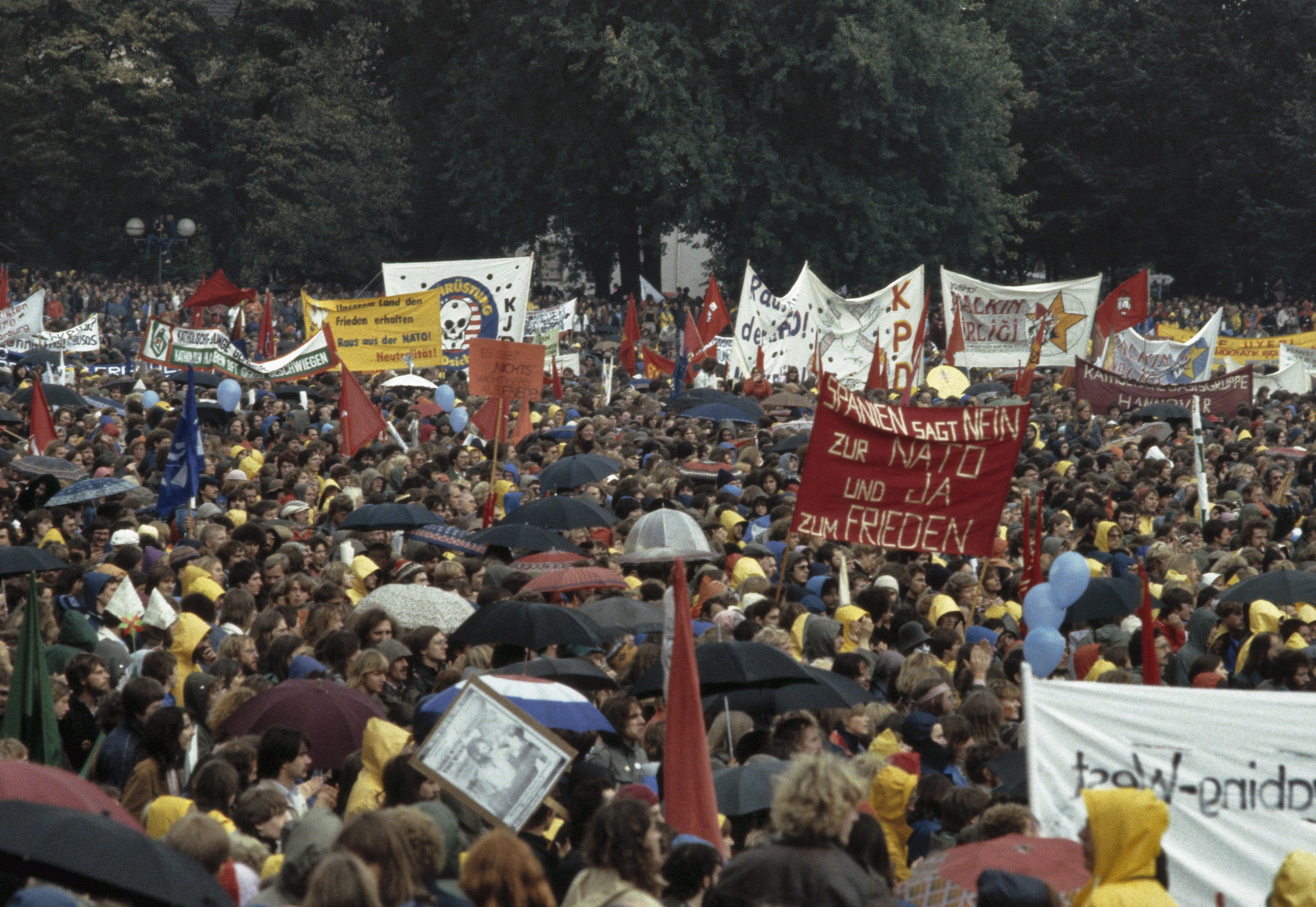
Protest against the deployment of Pershing II missiles in Europe, Bonn, West Germany, 1981

German naval planners in the 1890–1910 era denounced the Monroe Doctrine as a self-aggrandizing legal pretension to dominate the Western hemisphere. They were even more concerned with the possible American canal in Panama, because it would lead to full American hegemony in the Caribbean. The stakes were laid out in the German war aims proposed by the Navy in 1903: a "firm position in the West Indies," a "free hand in South America," and an official "revocation of the Monroe Doctrine" would provide a solid foundation for "our trade to the West Indies, Central and South America."

During the Cold War, anti-Americanism was the official government policy in East Germany, and dissenters were punished. In West Germany, anti-Americanism was the common position on the left, but the majority praised America as a protector against communism and a critical ally in rebuilding the nation. Germany's refusal to support the American-led 2003 invasion of Iraq was often seen as a manifestation of anti-Americanism. Anti-Americanism had been muted on the right since 1945, but re-emerged in the 21st century especially in the Alternative for Germany (AfD) party that began in opposition to European Union, and now has become both anti-American and anti-immigrant. Annoyance or distrust of the Americans was heightened in 2013 by revelations of American spying on top German officials, including Chancellor Merkel.

In the affair surrounding Der Spiegel journalist Claas Relotius, U.S. Ambassador to Germany Richard Grenell wrote to the magazine complaining about an anti-American institutional bias ("Anti-Amerikanismus") and asked for an independent investigation. Grenell wrote that "These fake news stories largely focus on U.S. policies and certain segments of the American people."

German historian Darius Harwardt has noted that from 1980 onwards, the term has seen an increase in usage in German politics, for example to discredit those that wish to close American military bases in Germany.

===== Greece =====
Although the Greeks have generally held a favorable attitude towards America and still do today, with 56.5% holding a favorable view in 2013, and 53% in 2025, Donald Trump was highly unpopular in Greece, with 73% having no confidence in him to do the right thing in world affairs. Joe Biden, however, is popular among the Greek public, with 67% having confidence in the former American president.

===== Netherlands =====
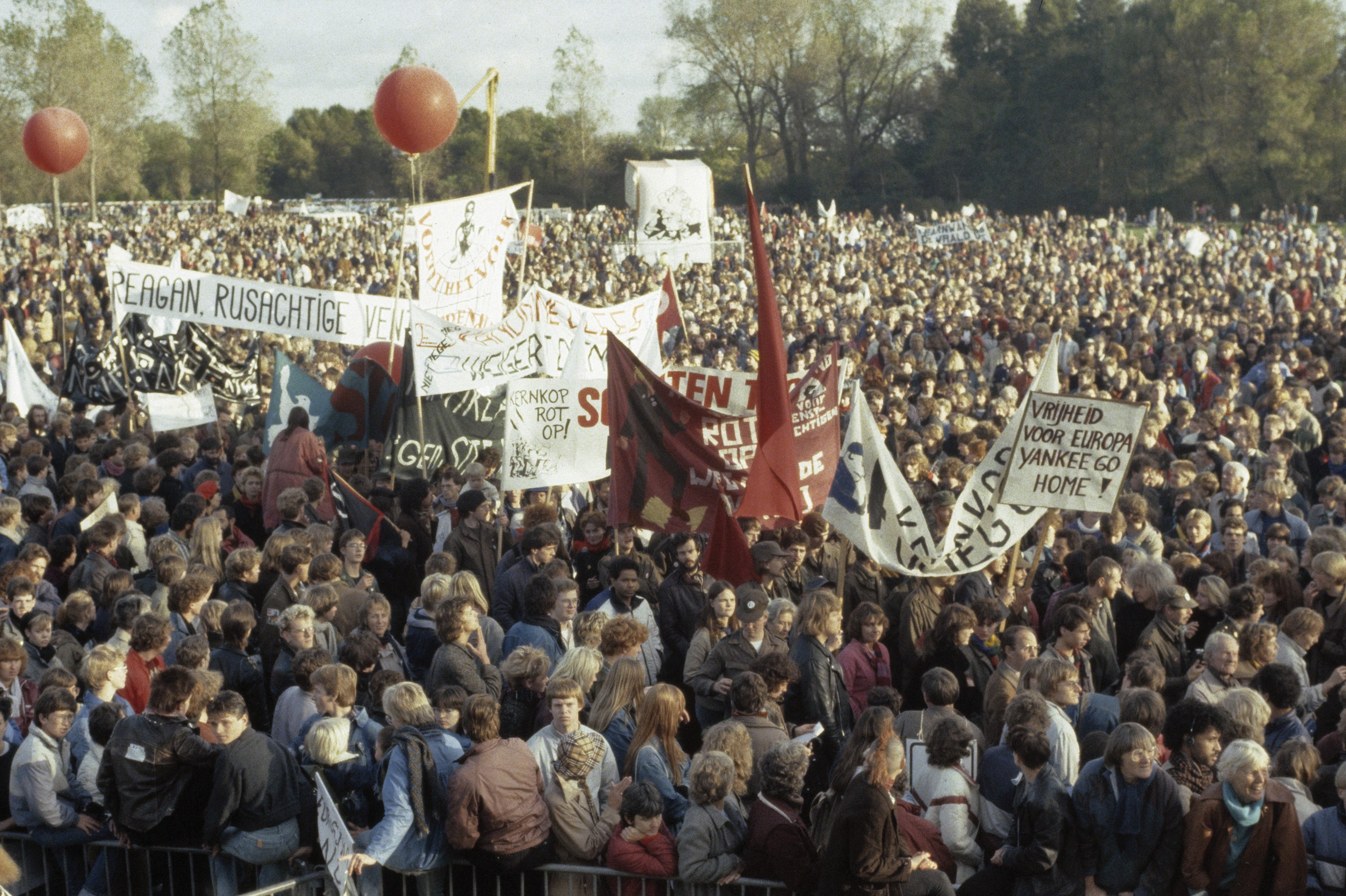
Protest against the deployment of Pershing II missiles, The Hague, 1983

Although the Dutch have generally held a favorable attitude toward America, there were negative currents in the aftermath of World War II as the Dutch blamed American policy as the reason why their colonies in Southeast Asia were able to gain independence. They credit their rescue from the Nazis in 1944–45 to the Canadian Army. Postwar attitudes continued the perennial ambiguity of anti-Americanism: the love-hate relationship, or willingness to adopt American cultural patterns while at the same time voicing criticism of them. In the 1960s, anti-Americanism revived largely in reaction against the Vietnam War. Its major early advocates were non-party-affiliated, left-wing students, journalists, and intellectuals. Dutch public opinion polls (1975–83) indicate a stable attitude toward the United States; only 10% of the people were deeply anti-American. The most strident rhetoric came from the left wing of Dutch politics and can largely be attributed to the consequences of Dutch participation in NATO. According to a Pew Research poll in 2025, 29% of Dutch people held a favorable opinion of the United States, while 69% held an unfavorable opinion.

===== United Kingdom =====
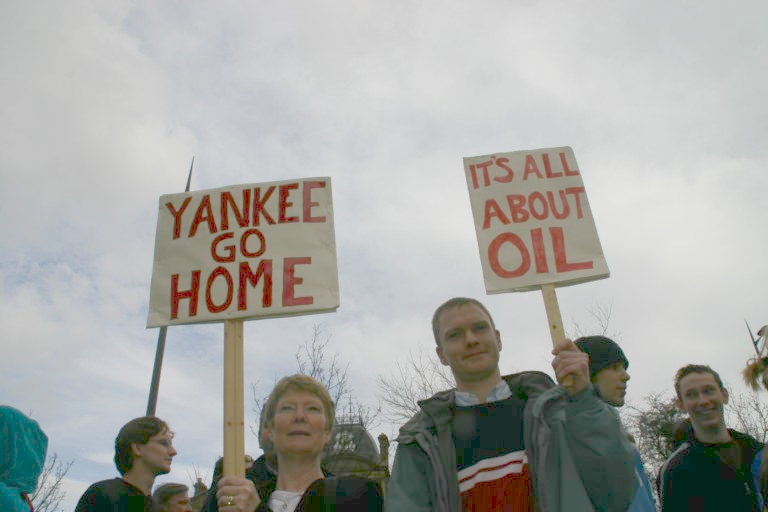
Anti-American banners in Liverpool, UK

According to a Pew Global Attitudes Project poll, during the George W. Bush administration, "favorable opinions" of America between 2000 and 2006 fell from 83% to 56% in the United Kingdom. According to a Pew Research poll in 2025, 50% of British people held a favorable opinion of the United States, while 49% held an unfavorable opinion.

News articles and blogs have discussed the negative experiences of Americans living in the United Kingdom.

Anti-American sentiment became more widespread in the United Kingdom following the Iraq War and the War in Afghanistan.

===== Ireland =====
Negative sentiment towards American tourists is implied to have risen around 2012 and 2014.

===== Denmark =====
Having already been on the rise along with the rest of Europe due to the 2025 Liberation Day tariffs, Anti-Americanism sharply rose in Denmark and Greenland in response to the Greenland crisis, in which the second Trump Administration announced its intention to seize Greenland, a Danish territory, including by military force. Despite Denmark being a traditional US ally, the Danish Defence Intelligence Service classified the US as a national security threat for the first time ever in its 2025 annual report. This culminated in the Hands off Greenland protests across the Danish Realm, in which protesters chanted anti-American slogans and rejected the proposed American takeover.

=== Asia ===
Anti-Americanism in the Middle East and parts of Asia has substantially increased due to U.S. sanctions and military involvement in countries like Afghanistan and Iraq, worsening relations and public opinion. However, East and South Asian countries like the Philippines, South Korea, and India remain the most pro-American countries.

==== East Asia ====
===== China =====
China has a history of anti-Americanism beginning with the general disdain for foreigners in the early 19th century that culminated in the Boxer Rebellion of 1900, which the U.S. helped in militarily suppressing.

During the Second Sino-Japanese War and World War II, the U.S. provided economic and military assistance to the Chiang Kai-shek government against the Japanese invasion. In particular, the "China Hands" (American diplomats known for their knowledge of China) also attempted to establish diplomatic contacts with Mao Zedong's communist regime in their stronghold in Yan'an, with a goal of fostering unity between the Nationalists and Communists. However, relations soured after communist victory in the Chinese Civil War and the relocation of the Chiang government to Taiwan, together with the start of the Cold War and rise of McCarthyism in U.S. politics. The newly communist China and the U.S. fought a major undeclared war in Korea, 1950–53 and, as a result, President Harry S. Truman began advocating a policy of containment and sent the United States Seventh Fleet to deter a possible communist invasion of Taiwan. The U.S. signed the Sino-American Mutual Defense Treaty with Taiwan which lasted until 1979 and, during this period, the communist government in Beijing was not diplomatically recognized by the U.S. By 1950, virtually all American diplomatic staff had left mainland China, and one of Mao's political goals was to identify and destroy factions inside China that might be favorable to capitalism.

Mao initially ridiculed the U.S. as "paper tiger" occupiers of Taiwan, "the enemy of the people of the world and has increasingly isolated itself" and "monopoly capitalist groups", and it was argued that Mao never intended friendly relations with the U.S. However, due to the Sino-Soviet split and increasing tension between China and the Soviet Union, US President Richard Nixon signaled a diplomatic rapprochement with communist China, and embarked on an official visit in 1972. Diplomatic relations between the two countries were eventually restored in 1979. After Mao's death, Deng Xiaoping embarked on economic reforms, and hostility diminished sharply, while large-scale trade and investments, as well as cultural exchanges, became major factors. Following the Tiananmen Square protests of 1989, the U.S. placed economic and military sanctions upon China, although official diplomatic relations continued.

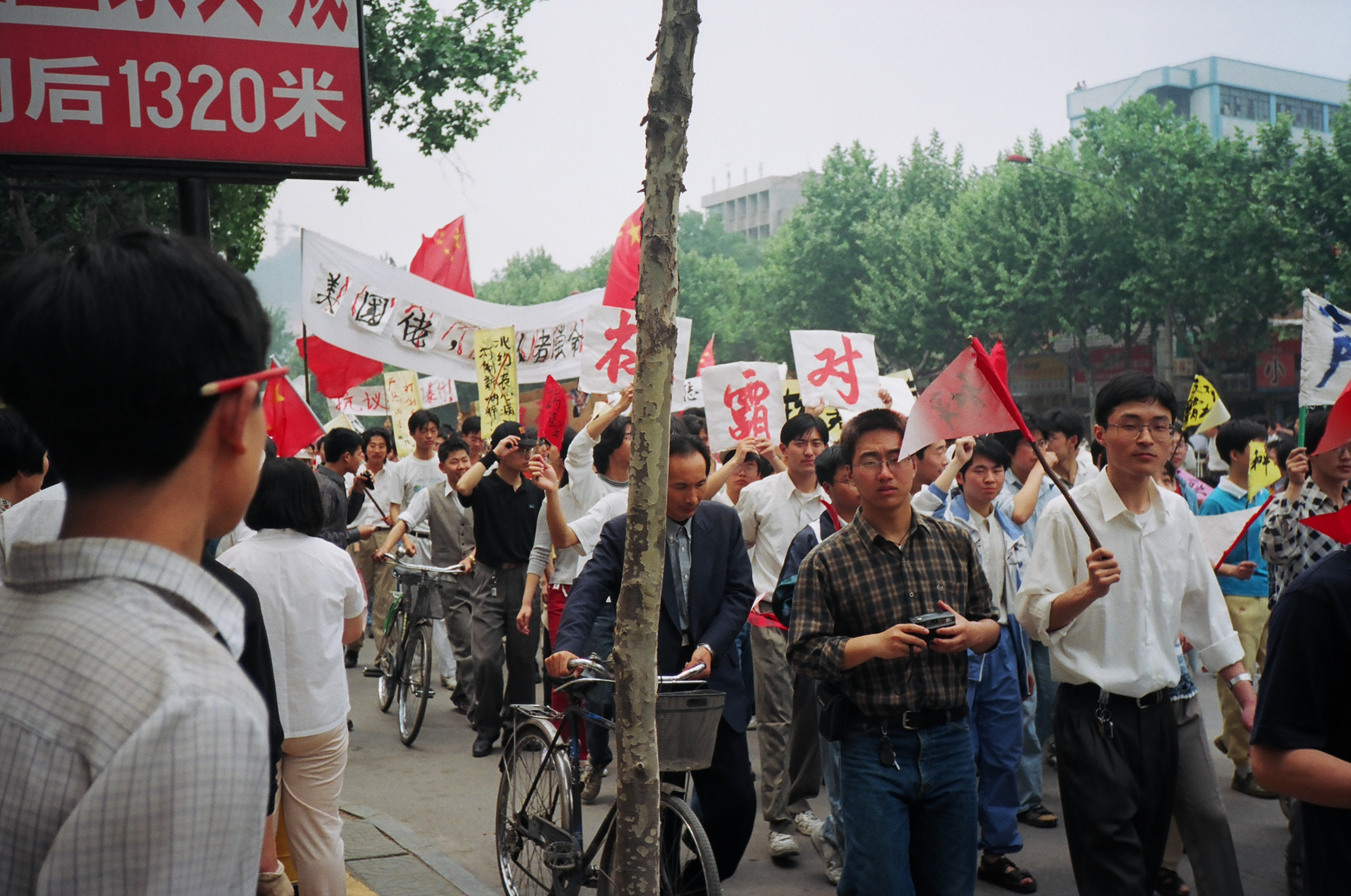
Anti-American protests in Nanjing following the U.S. bombing of the Chinese embassy in Belgrade, 1999

In 2013, 53% of Chinese respondents in a Pew survey had a "very unfavorable" or "somewhat unfavorable" view of the U.S. Relations improved slightly near the end of Obama's term in 2016, with 44% of Chinese respondents expressing an unfavorable view of the U.S. compared to 50% of respondents expressing a favorable view.

There has been a significant increase in anti-Americanism since U.S. President Donald Trump launched a trade war against China, with Chinese media airing Korean War films. In May 2019, Global Times said that "the trade war with the U.S. at the moment reminds Chinese of military struggles between China and the U.S. during the Korean War."

===== Japan =====
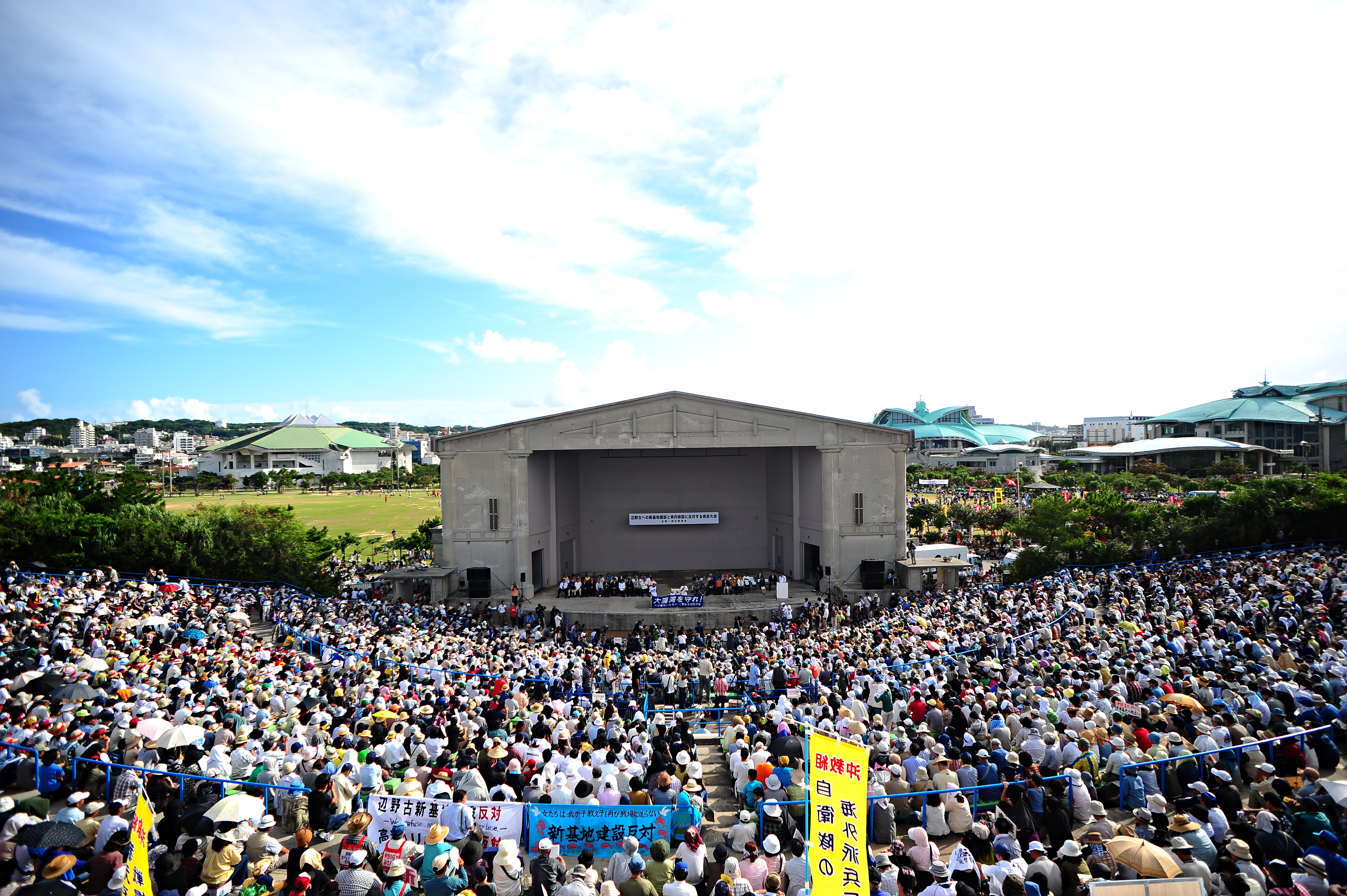
Okinawans protesting against the U.S. Marine Corps Air Station Futenma in Ginowan, 8 November 2009

In Japan, objections to the behavior and presence of American military personnel are sometimes reported as anti-Americanism, such as the 1995 Okinawa rape incident. As of 2008, the ongoing U.S. military presence on Okinawa remained a contentious issue in Japan.

While protests have arisen because of specific incidents, they are often reflective of deeper historical resentments. Robert Hathaway, director of the Wilson Center's Asia program, suggests: "The growth of anti-American sentiment in both Japan and South Korea must be seen not simply as a response to American policies and actions, but as reflective of deeper domestic trends and developments within these Asian countries". In Japan, a variety of threads have contributed to anti-Americanism in the post-war era, including pacifism on the left, nationalism on the right, and opportunistic worries over American influence in Japanese economic life.

From the postwar until today, most conservatives, including the Liberal Democratic Party, have a pro-American view; there are "anti-American conservative" who are critical of this and seek to preserve Japan's independent foreign policy or cultural values. Negative views of America increased during the second presidency of Donald Trump; according to a Pew Research poll in 2025, 55% of Japanese held a favorable opinion of the United States, down from 70% in 2024, while 44% held an unfavorable opinion, up from 28% in 2024.

===== South Korea =====
Speaking to the Wilson Center, Katharine Moon notes that while the majority of South Koreans support the American alliance "anti-Americanism also represents the collective venting of accumulated grievances that in many instances have lain hidden for decades". In the 1990s, scholars, policy makers, and the media noted that anti-Americanism was motivated by the rejection of authoritarianism and a resurgent nationalism, this nationalist anti-Americanism continued into the 2000s fueled by a number of incidents such as the IMF crisis. During the early 1990s, Western princess, prostitutes for American soldiers became a symbol of anti-American nationalism.

"Dear American" is an anti-American song sung by Psy. "Fucking USA" is an anti-American protest song written by South Korean singer and activist Yoon Min-suk. Strongly anti-U.S. foreign policy and anti-Bush, the song was written in 2002 at a time when, following the Apolo Ohno Olympic controversy and an incident in Yangju in which two Korean middle school students died after being struck by a U.S. Army vehicle, anti-American sentiment in South Korea reached high levels. However, by 2009, a majority of South Koreans were reported as having a favorable view of the United States. In 2014, 58% of South Koreans had a favorable view of the U.S., making South Korea one of the world's most pro-American countries. According to a Pew Research poll in 2025, 61% of South Koreans held a favorable opinion of the United States, down from 77% in 2024, while 39% held an unfavorable opinion, up from 19% in 2024. According to a KStatResearch poll in October 2025, 56% of South Koreans had favorable opinions of the United States, while 40% had a negative opinion.

===== North Korea =====
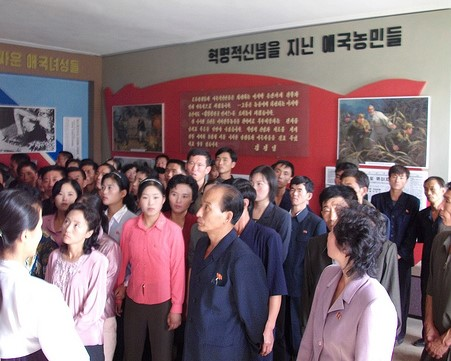
North Koreans touring the Museum of American War Atrocities in 2009

Relations between North Korea and the United States have been hostile ever since the Korean War, and the former's more recent development of nuclear weapons and long range missiles has further increased tension between the two nations. The United States currently maintains a military presence in South Korea, and President George W. Bush had previously described North Korea as part of the "Axis of Evil".

In North Korea, July is the "Month of Joint Anti-American Struggle," with festivities to denounce the U.S.

==== Southeast Asia ====
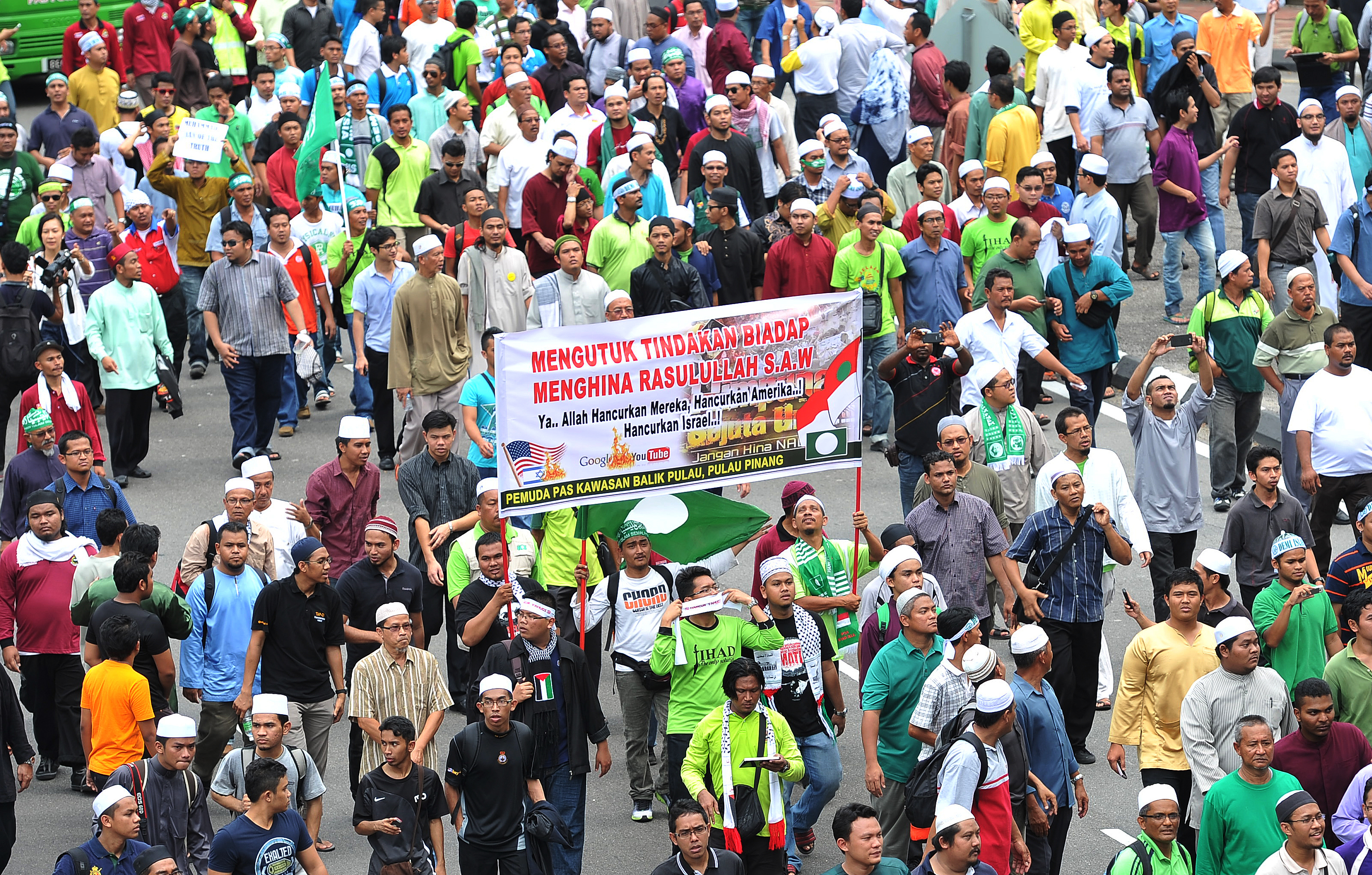
Protesters in Kuala Lumpur take to the streets to demonstrate against the Innocence of Muslims film.

===== Philippines =====
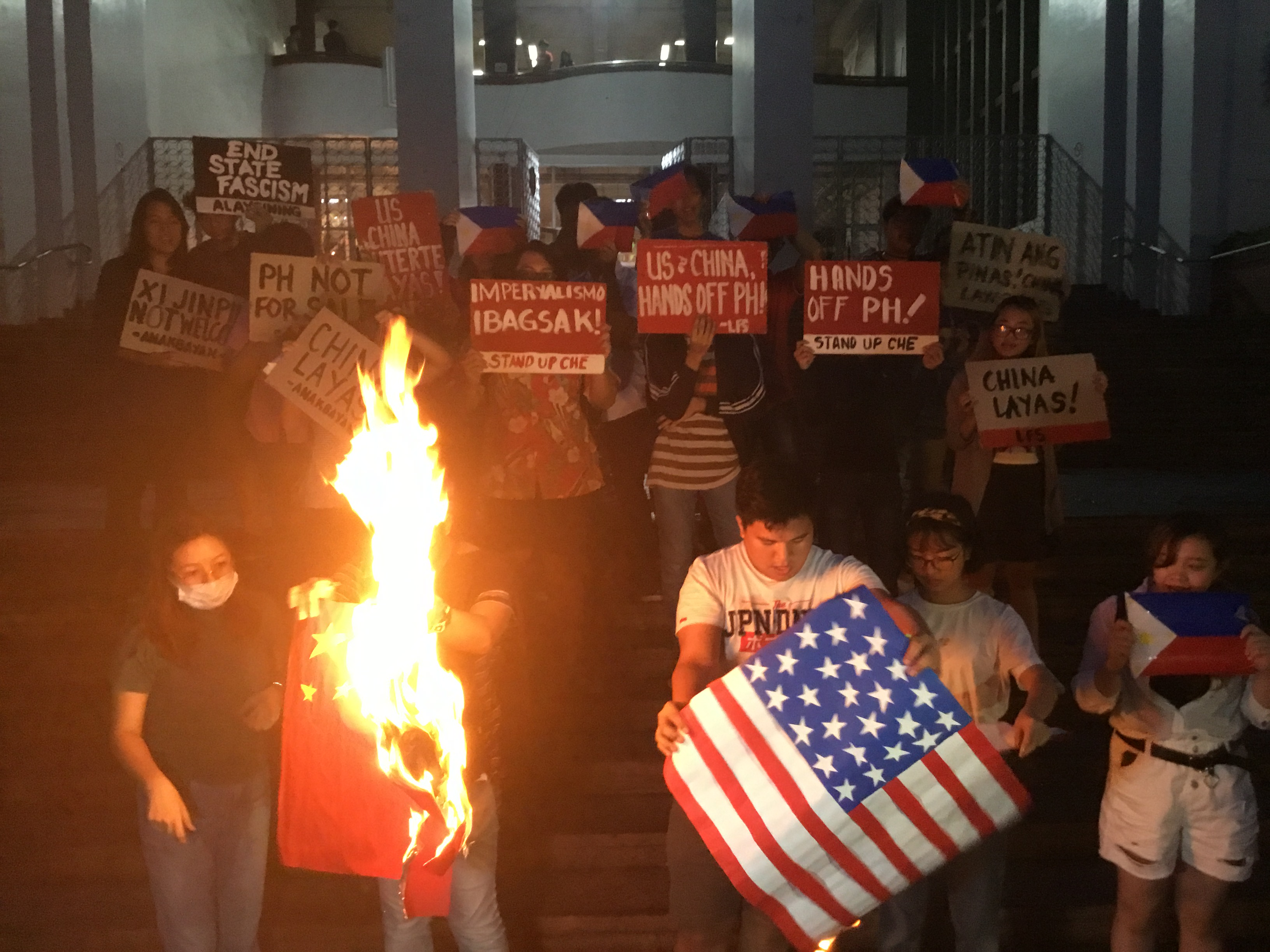
Student-activists from University of the Philippines and Ateneo de Manila University burn the flag of China and US to protest against their encroachment of Philippine sovereignty.

Anti-American sentiment has existed in the Philippines, owing primarily to the Philippine–American War of more than 100 years ago, and the 1898–1946 period of US colonial rule. One of the country's most recognizable patriotic hymns, Nuestra patria (lit. 'Our Fatherland'; Tagalog: Bayan Ko, lit. 'My Country'), written during the Philippine–American War, makes reference to "the Anglo-Saxon … who with vile treason subjugates [the Fatherland]". The song then exhorts the invaded and later occupied nation to "free [it]self from the traitor." Mojarro (2020) wrote that, during the US occupation, "Filipino intellectuals and patriots fully rejected US tutelage of Philippine politics and the economy," adding that "The Spanish language was understood then as a tool of cultural and political resistance." Manuel L. Quezon himself refused to learn English, having "felt betrayed by the Americans whom [the Katipunan] considered allies against Spain".

Statesman and internationally renowned Hispanophone writer Claro Mayo Recto had once dared to oppose the national security interests of the US in the Philippines, such as when he campaigned against the US military bases in his country. During the 1957 presidential campaign, the Central Intelligence Agency (CIA) conducted black propaganda operations to ensure his defeat, including the distribution of condoms with holes in them and marked with "Courtesy of Claro M. Recto" on the labels. The CIA is also suspected of involvement in his death by heart attack less than three years later. Recto, who had no known heart disease, met with two mysterious "Caucasians" wearing business suits before he died. US government documents later showed that a plan to murder Recto with a vial of poison was discussed by CIA Chief of Station Ralph Lovett and US Ambassador Admiral Raymond Spruance years earlier.

In October 2012, American ships were found dumping toxic wastes into Subic Bay, spurring anti-Americanism and setting the stage for multiple rallies. When U.S. president Barack Obama toured Asia, in mid to late April 2014 to visit Malaysia, South Korea, Japan, and the Philippines, hundreds of Filipino protests demonstrated in Manila shouting anti-Obama slogans, with some even burning mock U.S. flags.

The controversial Visiting Forces Agreement adds further fuel to anti-American sentiment, especially among Philippine Muslims. US military personnel have also been tried and convicted for rapes and murders committed on Philippine soil against civilians. These service personnel would later either be freed by the justice system or receive a presidential pardon.

However, despite these incidents, a poll conducted in 2011 by the BBC found that 90% of Filipinos have a favorable view of the U.S., higher than the view of the U.S. in any other country. According to a Pew Research Center Poll released in 2014, 92% of Filipinos viewed the U.S. favorably, making the Philippines the most pro-American nation in the world. The election of Rodrigo Duterte in 2016, along with persistently high approval ratings thereafter, nevertheless herald a new era marked by neonationalism and a resurgent anti-Americanism founded on what had by then been long-unattended historical grievances.

==== South Asia ====
===== Afghanistan =====
Drone strikes have led to growing anti-Americanism.

===== Pakistan =====
Negative attitudes toward the U.S.'s influence on the world has risen in Pakistan as a result of U.S. drone attacks on the country introduced by George W. Bush and continued by Barack Obama. In a poll surveying opinions toward the United States, Pakistan scored as the most negatively aligned nation, jointly alongside Serbia.

==== Middle East ====
After World War I, admiration was expressed for American President Woodrow Wilson's promulgation of democracy, freedom and self-determination in the Fourteen Points and, during World War II, the high ideals of the Atlantic Charter received favorable notice. According to Tamim Ansary, in Destiny Disrupted: A History of the World Through Islamic Eyes (2009), early views of America were mostly positive in the Middle East and the Muslim World.

Just as they do elsewhere in the world, spikes in anti-Americanism in the region correlate with the adoption or the reiteration of certain policies by the U.S. government, particularly its support for Israel in the occupation of Palestine and the Iraq War. In regards to 9/11, a Gallup poll noted that while most Muslims (93%) polled opposed the attacks, 'radicals' (7%) supported it, citing in their favor, not religious view points, but disgust at U.S. policies. In effect, when targeting U.S. or other Western assets in the region, radical armed groups in the Middle East, Al-Qaeda included, have made reference to U.S. policies and alleged crimes against humanity to justify their attacks. For example, to explain the Khobar Towers bombing (in which 19 American airmen were killed), Bin Laden, although proven to have not committed the attack, named U.S. support for Israel in instances of attacks against Muslims, such as the Sabra and Shatila massacre and the Qana massacre, as the reasons behind the attack.

Al-Qaeda also cited the U.S. sanctions on and bombing of Iraq in the Iraqi no-fly zones (1991–2003), which exacted a large toll in the Arab country's civilian population, as a justification to kill Americans.

Although right-wing scholars (e.g. Paul Hollander) have given prominence to the role that religiosity, culture and backwardness play in inflaming anti-Americanism in the region, the poll noted that radicalism among Arabs or Muslims isn't correlated with poverty, backwardness or religiosity. Radicals were in fact shown to be better educated and wealthier than 'moderates'.

There is also, however, a cultural dimension to anti-Americanism among religious and conservative groups in the Middle East. It may have its origins with Sayyid Qutb. Qutb, an Egyptian who was the leading intellectual of the Muslim Brotherhood, studied in Greeley, Colorado from 1948 to 1950, and wrote a book, The America I Have Seen (1951) based on his impressions. In it he decried everything in America from individual freedom and taste in music to church socials and haircuts. Wrote Qutb, "They danced to the tunes of the gramophone, and the dance floor was replete with tapping feet, enticing legs, arms wrapped around waists, lips pressed to lips, and chests pressed to chests. The atmosphere was full of desire..." He offered a distorted chronology of American history and was disturbed by its sexually liberated women: "The American girl is well acquainted with her body's seductive capacity. She knows it lies in the face, and in expressive eyes, and thirsty lips. She knows seductiveness lies in the round breasts, the full buttocks, and in the shapely thighs, sleek legs – and she shows all this and does not hide it". He was particularly disturbed by jazz, which he called the American's preferred music, and which "was created by Negroes to satisfy their love of noise and to whet their sexual desires ..." Qutb's writings influenced generations of militants and radicals in the Middle East who viewed America as a cultural temptress bent on overturning traditional customs and morals, especially with respect to the relations between the sexes.

Qutb's ideas influenced Osama bin Laden, an anti-American extremist from Saudi Arabia, who was the founder of the Jihadist organization Al-Qaeda. In conjunction with several other Islamic militant leaders, bin Laden issued two fatawa – in 1996 and then again in 1998 – that Muslims should kill military personnel and civilians of the United States until the United States government withdraw military forces from Islamic countries and withdraw support for Israel.

After the 1996 fatwa, entitled "Declaration of War against the Americans Occupying the Land of the Two Holy Places", bin Laden was put on a criminal file by the U.S. Federal Bureau of Investigation (FBI) under an American Civil War era statute which forbids instigating violence and attempting to overthrow the U.S. government. He has also been indicted in United States federal court for his alleged involvement in the 1998 U.S. embassy bombings in Dar es Salaam, Tanzania and Nairobi, Kenya, and was on the FBI's Ten Most Wanted Fugitives list. On 14 January 2009, bin Laden vowed to continue the fight and open up new fronts against the U.S. on behalf of the Islamic world.

In 2002 and in mid-2004, Zogby International polled the favorable/unfavorable ratings of the U.S. in Saudi Arabia, Egypt, Jordan, Lebanon, Morocco, and the United Arab Emirates (UAE). In Zogby's 2002 survey, 76% of Egyptians had a negative attitude toward the United States, compared with 98% in 2004. In Morocco, 61% viewed the country unfavorably in 2002, but in two years, that number had jumped to 88 percent. In Saudi Arabia, such responses rose from 87% in 2002 to 94% in 2004. Attitudes were virtually unchanged in Lebanon but improved slightly in the UAE, from 87% who said in 2002 that they disliked the United States to 73% in 2004. However, most of these countries mainly objected to foreign policies that they considered unfair.

===== Iran =====
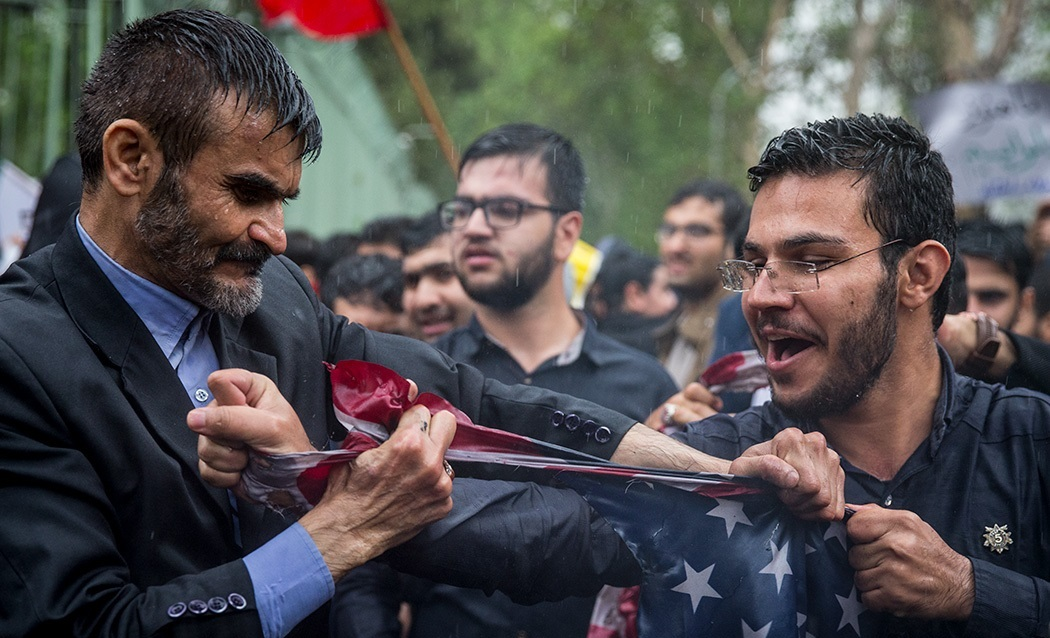
Two protesters in Iran tearing an American flag at an anti-American rally after the American withdrawal from the Iran nuclear deal

The chant "Death to America" (Persian: مرگ بر آمریکا) has been in use in Iran since at least the Iranian revolution in 1979, along with other phrases often represented as anti-American. A 1953 coup which involved the CIA was cited as a grievance. State-sponsored murals characterized as anti-American dot the streets of Tehran. It has been suggested that under Ayatollah Khomeini anti-Americanism was little more than a way to distinguish between domestic supporters and detractors, and even the phrase "Great Satan" which has previously been associated with anti-Americanism, appears to now signify both the American and British governments.

The Iran hostage crisis that lasted from 1979 to 1981, in which fifty-two Americans were held hostage in Tehran for 444 days, was also a demonstration of anti-Americanism, one which considerably worsened mutual perceptions between the U.S. and Iran.

===== Jordan =====
Anti-Americanism is felt very strongly in Jordan and has been on the rise since at least 2003. Despite the fact that Jordan is one of America's closest allies in the Middle East and the Government of Jordan is pro-American and pro-Western, the anti-Americanism of Jordanians is among the highest in the world. Anti-Americanism rose dramatically after the 2003 invasion of Iraq, when a United States-led coalition invaded Iraq to remove Saddam Hussein from power. According to several Pew Research Attitudes polls conducted since 2003, 99% of Jordanians viewed the U.S. unfavorably and 82% of Jordanians viewed American people unfavorably. Although 2017 data indicates negative attitudes towards the U.S. and American people have gone down to 82% and 61% respectively, rates of anti-Americanism in Jordan are still among the highest in the world.

===== Palestinian territories =====
In July 2013, Palestinian Cleric Ismat Al-Hammouri, a leader of the Jerusalem-based Hizb ut-Tahrir, called for the destruction of America, France, Britain and Rome to conquer and destroy the enemies of the "Nation of Islam". He warned:

"We warn you, oh America: Take your hands off the Muslims. You have wreaked havoc in Syria, and before that, in Afghanistan and in Iraq, and now in Egypt. Who do you think we are, America? We are the nation of Islam — a giant and mighty nation, which extends from east to west. Soon, we will teach you a political and military lesson, Allah willing. Allahu Akbar. All glory to Allah."

Al-Hammouri also warned U.S. president Barack Obama that there is an impending rise of a united Muslim empire that will instill religious law on all of its subjects.

===== Saudi Arabia =====
In Saudi Arabia, anti-American sentiment was described as "intense" and "at an all-time high" in 2005.

According to the survey taken by the Saudi intelligence service of "educated Saudis between the ages of 25 and 41" taken shortly after the 9/11 attacks "concluded that 95 percent" of those surveyed supported Bin Laden's cause. (Support for Bin Laden reportedly waned by 2006 and by then, the Saudi population become considerably more pro-American, after Al-Qaeda linked groups staged attacks inside Saudi Arabia.) The proposal at the Defense Policy Board to 'take Saudi out of Arabia' was spread as the secret US plan for the kingdom.

===== Turkey =====
In 2009, during U.S. president Barack Obama's visit to Turkey, anti-American protestors held signs saying "Obama, new president of the American imperialism that is the enemy of the world's people, your hands are also bloody. Get out of our country." Protestors also shouted phrases such as "Yankee go home" and "Obama go home". A 2017 Pew Research poll indicated that 67% of Turkish respondents held unfavourable views of Americans and 82% disapproved of the spread of American ideas and customs in their country; both percentages were the highest out of all the nations surveyed.

Anti-American sentiment in Turkey had existed since the mid-1940s. However, Anti-Americanism began to spread primarily in the 1950s due to views that America had begun to dominate Turkey and spread its cultural influence into the middle class.

Leftist figures such as Mehmet Ali Aybar, who would later become the Chairman of the Turkish Worker's Party, opposed collaboration between the USA and Turkey, on the grounds that US economic aid would turn Turkey into an "Anglo-Saxon satellite state" as early as 1947. The Turkish revolutionary and Maoist İbrahim Kaypakkaya considered Turkey to be an American semi-colony. However, there were also growing Anti-American sentiments on the Turkish Right. Conservative newspapers such as Büyük Doğu and Kuvvet also held views that America would in the future meddle in Turkish domestic affairs. Anti-American sentiment spread among more of the public when a law was passed in Turkey that authorized only US officials to exercise criminal jurisdiction over American personnel in cases where a criminal act had been committed. While this on its own did not lead to Anti-American sentiment spreading, it did mean that any incidents resulting from the actions of American personnel would have a considerable impact on popular views towards America. Such incidents often led to anger and resentment to American personnel and America by extension.

Anti-Americanism in Turkey saw a significant rise as a result of the Johnson Letter in the 1960s, which stated that the US was against an invasion of Cyprus, and stated that the USA would not come to the aid of Turkey if an invasion of Cyprus led to war with the Soviet Union. Many Turks saw the letter as tantamount to outright veto power over Turkish affairs by the USA.

=== The Americas ===
All the countries of North and South America (including Canada, the United States of America, and Latin American countries) are often referred to as "The Americas" in the Anglosphere. In the U.S. and most countries outside Latin America, the terms "America" and "American" typically refer only to the United States of America and its citizens respectively. In the 1890s Cuban writer José Martí in an essay, "Our America," alludes to his objection to this usage.

==== Latin America ====
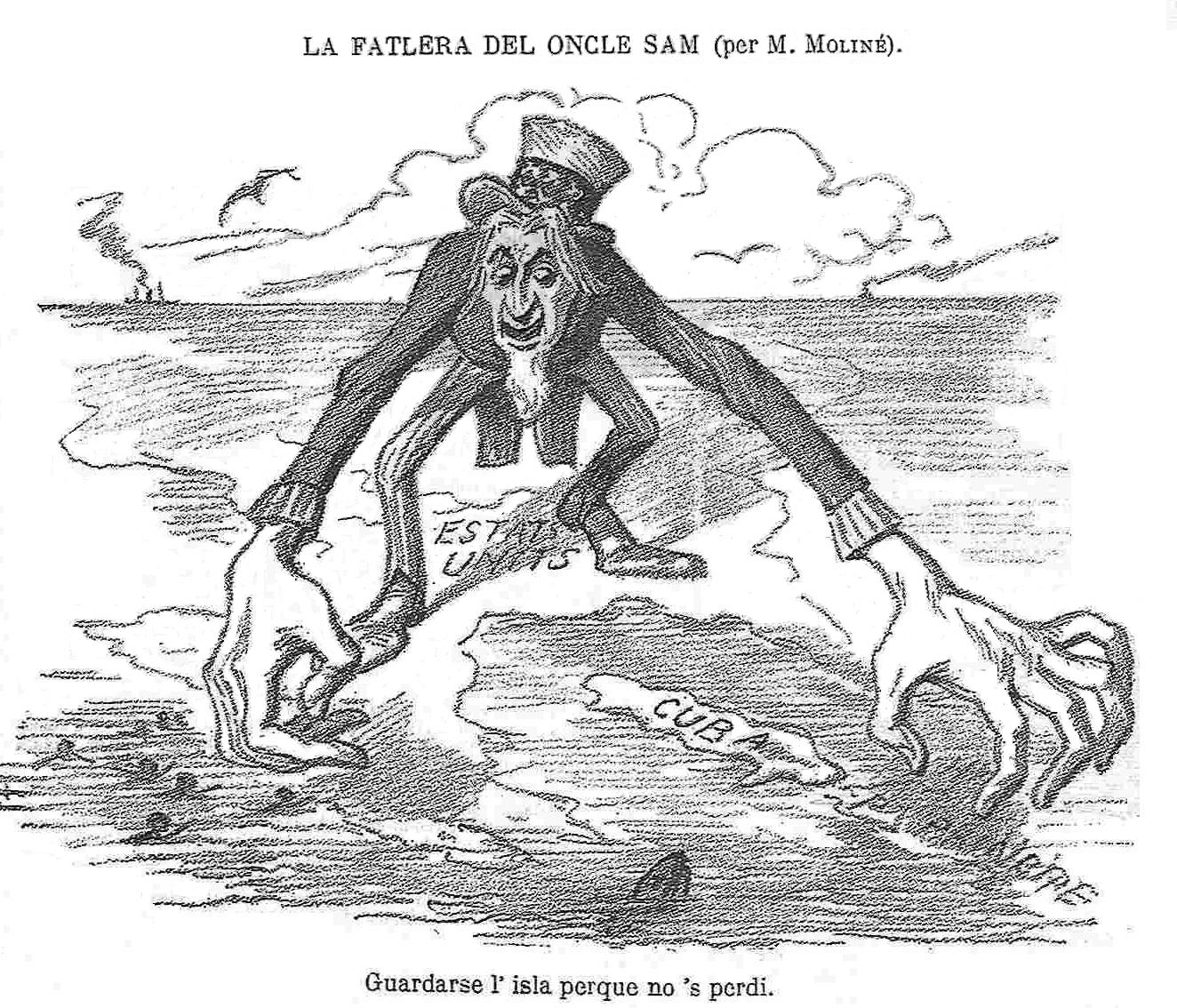
A Spanish satirical drawing published in La Campana de Gràcia (1896) criticizing U.S. behavior regarding Cuba by Manuel Moliné, just prior to the Spanish–American War. Upper text reads (in old Catalan): "Uncle Sam's craving", and below: "To keep the island so it won't get lost."

Anti-Americanism in Latin America has deep roots and is a key element of the concept of Latin American identity, "specifically anti-U.S. expansionism and Catholic anti-Protestantism." An 1828 exchange between William Henry Harrison, the U.S. minister plenipotentiary rebuked President Simón Bolívar of Gran Colombia, saying "... the strongest of all governments is that which is most free", calling on Bolívar to encourage the development of a democracy. In response, Bolívar wrote, "The United States ... seem destined by Providence to plague America with torments in the name of freedom", a phrase that achieved fame in Latin America.

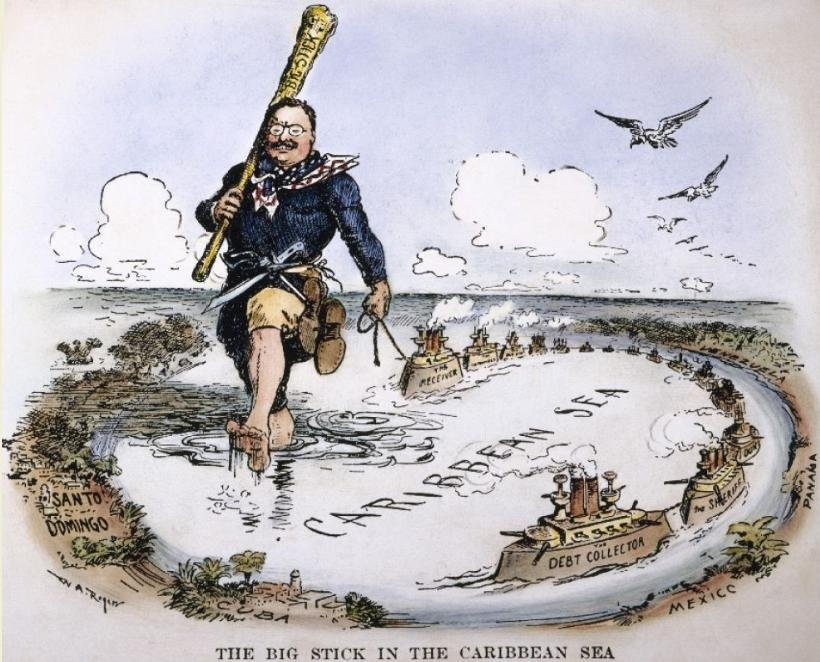
Cartoon depicting Theodore Roosevelt's Big Stick interventionism

The Spanish–American War of 1898, which escalated Cuba's war of independence from Spain, turned the U.S. into a world power and made Cuba a protectorate of the United States via the Platt Amendment to the Cuban constitution and the 1903 Cuban–American Treaty of Relations. The U.S. action was consistent with the Big Stick ideology espoused by Theodore Roosevelt's corollary to the Monroe Doctrine that led to numerous interventions in Central America and the Caribbean, also prompted hatred of the U.S. in other regions of the Americas. A very influential formulation of Latin-American anti-Americanism, engendered by the 1898 war, was the Uruguayan journalist José Enrique Rodó's essay Ariel (1900) in which the spiritual values of the South American Ariel are contrasted to the brutish mass-culture of the American Caliban. This essay had enormous influence throughout Spanish America in the 1910s and 1920s, and prompted resistance to what was seen as American cultural imperialism. Perceived racist attitudes of the White Anglo-Saxon Protestants of the North toward the populations of Latin America also caused resentment.

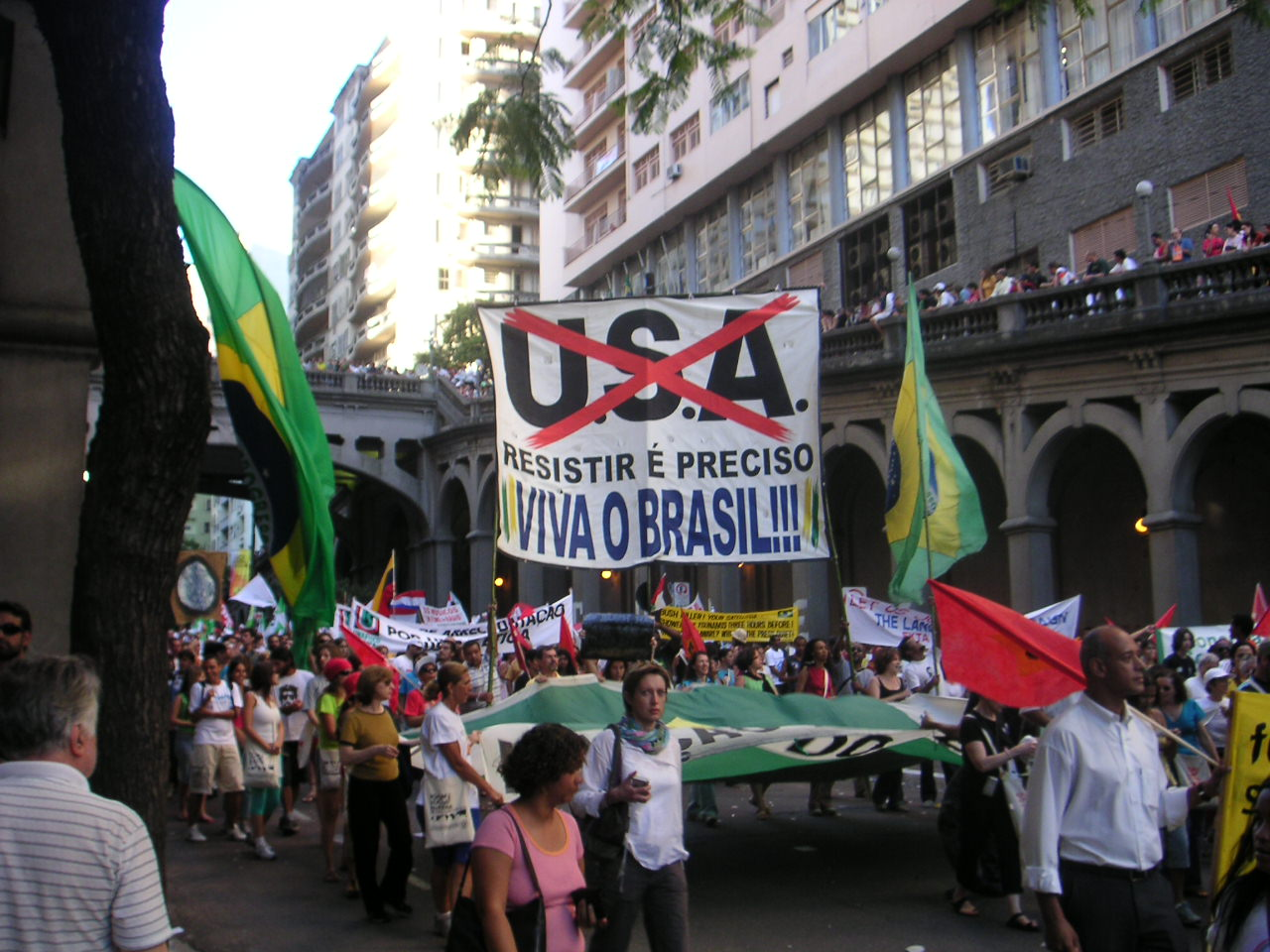
Anti-U.S. banner in a demonstration in Brazil, 27 January 2005

The Student Reform that began in the Argentine University of Cordoba in 1918, boosted the idea of anti-imperialism throughout Latin America, and played a fundamental role for launching the concept that was to be developed over several generations. Already in 1920, the Federación Universitaria Argentina issued a manifesto entitled Denunciation of Imperialism.

Since the 1940s, U.S. relations with Argentina have been tense, when the U.S. feared the regime of General Peron was too close to Nazi Germany. In 1954, American support for the 1954 Guatemalan coup d'état against the democratically elected President Jacobo Arbenz Guzmán fueled anti-Americanism in the region. This CIA-sponsored coup prompted a former president of that country, Juan José Arévalo to write a fable entitled The Shark and the Sardines (1961) in which a predatory shark (representing the United States) overawes the sardines of Latin America.

Vice-President Richard Nixon's tour of South America in 1958 prompted a spectacular eruption of anti-Americanism. The tour became the focus of violent protests which climaxed in Caracas, Venezuela where Nixon was almost killed by a raging mob as his motorcade drove from the airport to the city. In response, President Dwight D. Eisenhower assembled troops at Guantanamo Bay and a fleet of battleships in the Caribbean to intervene to rescue Nixon if necessary.

Fidel Castro, the late revolutionary leader of Cuba, tried throughout his career to co-ordinate long-standing Latin American resentments against the USA through military and propagandist means. He was aided in this goal by the failed Bay of Pigs Invasion of Cuba in 1961, planned and implemented by the American government against his regime. This disaster damaged American credibility in the Americas and gave a boost to its critics worldwide. According to Rubin and Rubin, Castro's Second Declaration of Havana, in February 1962, "constituted a declaration of war on the United States and the enshrinement of a new theory of anti-Americanism". Castro called America "a vulture...feeding on humanity". The United States embargo against Cuba maintained resentment and Castro's colleague, the famed revolutionary Che Guevara, expressed his hopes during the Vietnam War of "creating a Second or a Third Vietnam" in the Latin American region against the designs of what he believed to be U.S. imperialism.

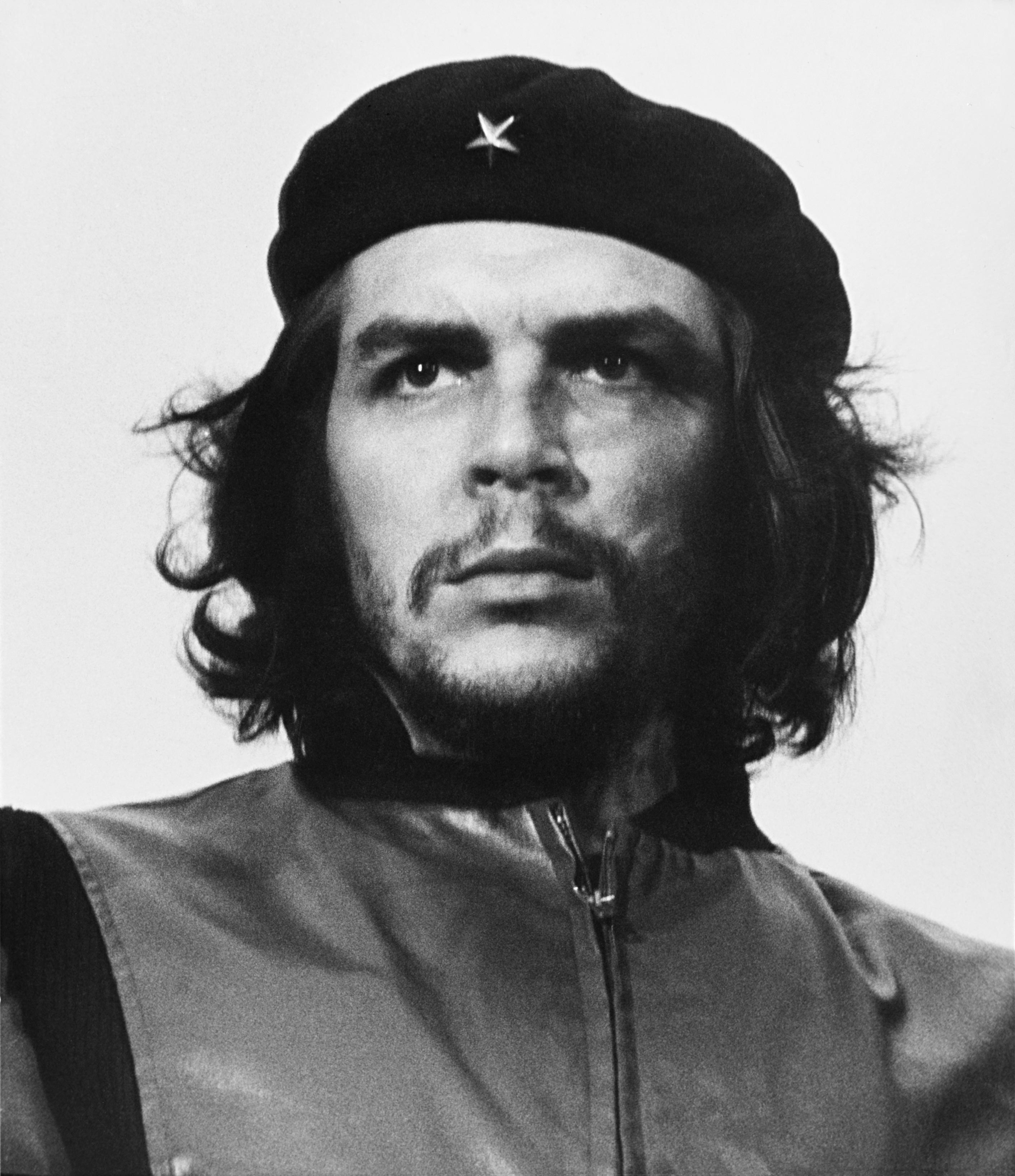
Guerrillero Heroico, Che Guevara, one of the iconic images from the Cuban Revolution and more generally anti-imperialism. Photo by Alberto Korda, 1961.

The United States hastens the delivery of arms to the puppet governments they see as being increasingly threatened; it makes them sign pacts of dependence to legally facilitate the shipment of instruments of repression and death and of troops to use them.

— Che Guevara, 9 April 1961

Many subsequent U.S. interventions against countries in the region, including democracies, and support for military dictatorships solidified Latin American anti-Americanism. These include the 1964 Brazilian coup d'état, the 1965–1966 occupation of the Dominican Republic, the 1971 Bolivian and 1973 Chilean coup d'états, U.S. involvement in Argentina's Dirty War, U.S. involvement in Operation Condor, the Salvadoran Civil War, the support of the Contras, the training of future military men, subsequently seen as war criminals, in the School of the Americas, the refusal to extradite convicted terrorist Luis Posada Carriles, and U.S. support for dictators such as Paraguayan Alfredo Stroessner, Haitian François Duvalier, and pre-1989 Panamanian Manuel Noriega.

Many Latin Americans perceived that neo-liberalism reforms were failures in the 1980s and 1990s and intensified their opposition to the Washington consensus. This led to a resurgence in support for Pan-Americanism, support for popular movements in the region, the nationalization of key industries and centralization of government. America's tightening of the economic embargo on Cuba in 1996 and 2004 also caused resentment amongst Latin American leaders and prompted them to use the Rio Group and the Madrid-based Ibero-American Summits as meeting places rather than the United States-dominated OAS. This trend has been reinforced through the creation of a series of regional political bodies such as Unasur and the Community of Latin American and Caribbean States, and a strong opposition to the materialization of the Washington-sponsored Free Trade Area of the Americas at the 2005 4th Summit of the Americas.

Polls compiled by the Chicago Council on Global Affairs showed in 2006 Argentine public opinion was quite negative regarding America's role in the world. In 2007, 26% of Argentines had a favorable view of the American people, with 57% having an unfavorable view. Argentine public opinion of the United States and U.S. policies improved during the Obama administration, and as of 2010 was divided about evenly (42% to 41%) between those who viewed these favorably or unfavorably. The ratio remained stable by 2013, with 38% of Argentines having a favorable view and 40% having an unfavorable view.

Furthermore, the renewal of the concession for the U.S. military base in Manta, Ecuador was met by considerable criticism, derision, and even doubt by the supporters of such an expansion. The near-war sparked by the 2008 Andean diplomatic crisis was expressed by a high-level Ecuadorean military officer as being carried under American auspices. The officer said "a large proportion of senior officers," share "the conviction that the United States was an accomplice in the attack" (launched by the Colombian military on a FARC camp in Ecuador, near the Colombian border). The Ecuadorean military retaliated by stating the 10-year lease on the base, which expired in November 2009, would not be renewed and that the U.S. military presence was expected to be scaled down starting three months before the expiration date.

===== Mexico =====
In the 1836 Texas Revolution, the Mexican province of Texas seceded from Mexico and nine years later, encouraged by the Monroe Doctrine and manifest destiny, the United States annexed the Republic of Texas - at its request, but against vehement opposition by Mexico, which refused to recognize the independence of Texas - and began their expansion into Western North America. Mexican anti-American sentiment was further inflamed by the resulting 1846–1848 Mexican–American War, in which Mexico lost more than half of its territory to the United States.

The Chilean writer Francisco Bilbao predicted in America in Danger (1856) that the loss of Texas and northern Mexico to "the talons of the eagle" was just a foretaste of an American bid for world domination. An early exponent of the concept of Latin America, Bilbao excluded Brazil and Paraguay from it, as well as Mexico, because "Mexico lacked a real republican consciousness, precisely because of its complicated relationship with the United States." Interventions by the U.S. prompted a later ruler of Mexico, Porfirio Diaz, to lament: "Poor Mexico, so far from God, and so close to the United States". Mexico's National Museum of Interventions, opened in 1981, is a testament to Mexico's sense of grievance with the United States.

In Mexico during the regime of liberal Porfirio Díaz (1876-1911), policies favored foreign investment, especially American, who sought profits in agriculture, ranching, mining, industry, and infrastructure such as railroads. Their dominance in agriculture and their acquisition of vast tracts of land at the expense of Mexican small holders and indigenous communities was a cause for peasant mobilization in the Mexican Revolution (1910–20). The program of the Liberal Party of Mexico (1906), explicitly called for policies against foreign ownership in Mexico, with the slogan "Mexico for the Mexicans." Land reform in Mexico in the postrevolutionary period had a major impact on these U.S. holdings, where many were expropriated.

===== Venezuela =====
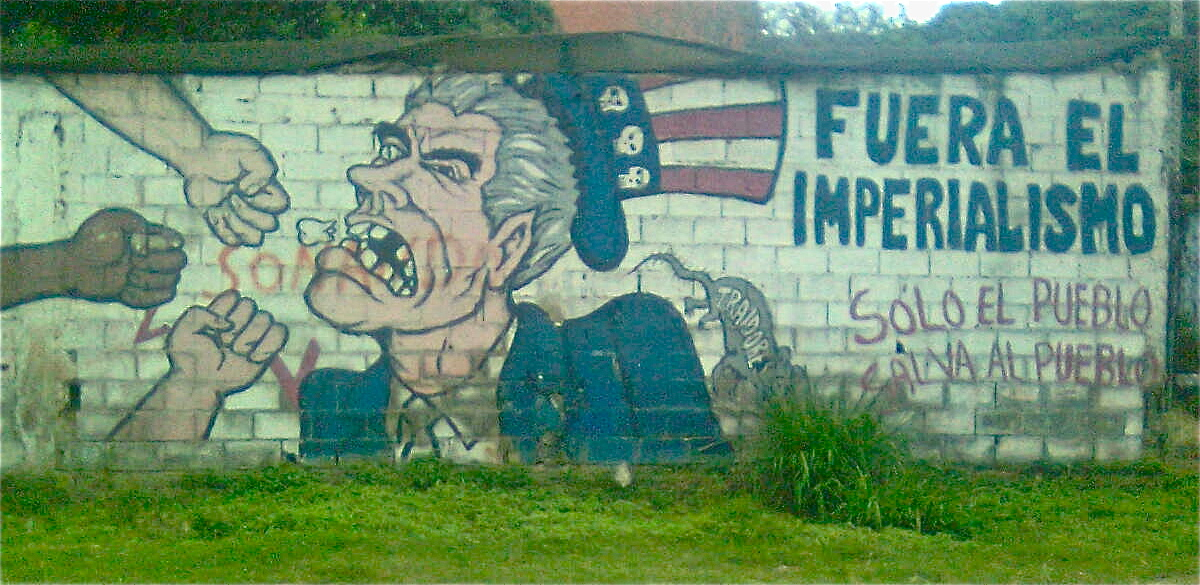
Hugo Chávez strongholds in Caracas slums, Venezuela, often feature political murals with anti-U.S. messages.

Since the start of the Hugo Chávez administration, relations between Venezuela and the United States deteriorated markedly, as Chávez became highly critical of the U.S. foreign policy. Chávez was known for his anti-American rhetoric. In a speech at the UN General Assembly, Chávez said that Bush promoted "a false democracy of the elite" and a "democracy of bombs". Chávez opposed the U.S.-led invasion of Iraq in 2003 and also condemned the NATO–led military intervention in Libya, calling it an attempt by the West and the U.S. to control the oil in Libya.

In 2015, the Obama administration signed an executive order which imposed targeted sanctions on seven Venezuelan officials whom the White House argued were instrumental in human rights violations, persecution of political opponents and significant public corruption and said that the country posed an "unusual and extraordinary threat to the national security and foreign policy of the United States." Nicolás Maduro responded to the sanctions in a couple of ways. He wrote an open letter in a full page ad in The New York Times in March 2015, stating that Venezuelans were "friends of the American people" and called President Obama's action of making targeted sanctions on the alleged human rights abusers a "unilateral and aggressive measure". Examples of accusations of human rights abuses from the United States to Maduro's government included the murder of Luis Manuel Díaz, a political activist, prior to legislative elections in Venezuela.

Maduro threatened to sue the United States over an executive order issued by the Obama Administration that declared Venezuela to be a threat to American security. He also planned to deliver 10 million signatures, denouncing the United States' decree declaring the situation in Venezuela an "extraordinary threat to US national security". and ordered all schools in the country to hold an "anti-imperialist day" against the United States with the day's activities including the "collection of the signatures of the students, and teaching, administrative, maintenance and cooking personnel". Maduro further ordered state workers to apply their signatures in protest, with some workers reporting that firings of state workers occurred due to their rejection of signing the executive order protesting the "Obama decree". There were also reports that members of Venezuelan armed forces and their families were ordered to sign against the United States decree.

==== Canada ====
Loyalist refugees on their way to Canada during the American Revolutionary War. Such refugees helped foster anti-American sentiment in Canada.

Anti-Americanism in Canada is often considered unique. Historians like J. L. Granatstein argue that no other political community has sustained such a deeply entrenched tradition of anti-American sentiment, while Frank Underhill noted how Canada holds the "world record as the oldest continuing anti-Americans," when speaking of its longevity. Political scientist Kim Richard Nossal highlights the role of the national myth pushed by Loyalist refugees who migrated north as a result of the American Revolution, who portrayed Canada as a community founded on a conscious rejection of the United States. Anti-American sentiment became more entrenched through generations of Canadian-U.S. disputes.

Granatstein further asserts that Canadian anti-Americanism is unique, not only for its long history but also for its relatively benign nature compared to other regions. As Canadians are within U.S. television and radio broadcast range, their anti-American rhetoric is often shaped by public opinion rather than political elites. Consequently, anti-Americanism in English Canada tends to be defined by a desire to differentiate from Americans, with common caricatures often based on half-truths or truths lacking context, and which often reflected public opinion that exists in certain U.S. sectors as well.

This benign form of anti-Americanism rarely leads to confrontation or calls for radical decoupling from the U.S. It is often restrained by shared culture, language, and heritage, manifesting instead as a sense of estrangement and mistrust or as an outlet for feelings of insecurity and hostility against the U.S. This sentiment tends to focus on the U.S. government and its policies rather than the American people. Canadians generally view Americans positively, but hold more negative opinions of U.S. leaders and policies.

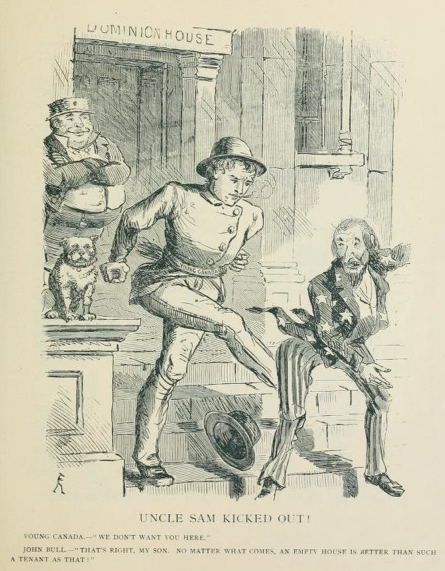
A 1869 Canadian political cartoon shows a young Canada kicking out Uncle Sam. Anti-Americanism in Canada often stems from concerns about U.S. influence and encroachment.

Historian Bruce C. Daniels suggests that the long-standing dynamic between Canadians and Americans has fostered an "invasion mentality" in Canada, with Canadians initially viewing the U.S. as a military threat and later as an economic and cultural one. Modern Canadian anti-Americanism is rooted in a mix of tangible nationalistic concerns over American influence and encroachment and intangible negative evaluations of American society in contrast to Canadian values. Historian Reginald C. Stuart identified five types of Canadian anti-Americanism that arises from disagreements with the U.S., including policy, anti-unilateralism, ideological, nationalistic, and partisan. The latter is a political strategy Canadian politicians have used to rally support against perceived external threats.

The paradox of Canadian anti-Americanism lies in Canada's simultaneous embrace of U.S. economic and cultural influence, and its persistent rejection of "American republicanism" as an "inappropriate means of governance" and viewing the U.S. as a threat to its identity and sovereignty. As Nossal argues, this creates a distinct form of anti-Americanism, different from European anti-American forms identified by James W. Ceaser, Paul Hollander, and Adam Garfinkle.

Anti-Americanism also varies across Canada. Anti-Americanism in French Canada aligns more with anti-Americanism in Europe as opposed to the forms found in English Canada. The degree of anti-Americanism also differs in Canada, with Lydia Miljan and Barry Cooper highlighting how the Loyalist heartland of southern Ontario embraced an anti-American "garrison mentality", while the formative mythos of provinces like Alberta and Newfoundland and Labrador place no significance to emotional anti-Americanism.

===== History of anti-Americanism in Canada =====
Before the American Revolution, colonists in British America (including the Thirteen Colonies, Newfoundland, Nova Scotia, and Rupert's Land) and New France (including Canada, Acadia, and Louisiana) engaged in four major conflicts, culminating in the British conquest of New France in 1760. However, British America fragmented decades later after the Province of Quebec declined to send delegates to the Second Continental Congress, the American invasion of Quebec failed, and the United Colonies declared independence from the British Empire. After the revolution, the British encouraged anti-American sentiment in British North America to discourage any inclination toward joining the United States.

While Quebec and Nova Scotia's inhabitants were primarily neutral, the influx of loyalist refugees from the war brought a population deeply loyal to the Crown and antagonistic to the American political regime that displaced them. This fostered a political community that rejected the American republic in favor of a constitutional monarchical system that evolved from 1774, laying the foundation for Canada's unique constitutional evolution and distinct anti-Americanism not seen elsewhere in the international system.

Although the two economies were increasingly intertwined, and there was population movement in both directions, the main trend in the 19th century, says Canadian Professor Kim Richard Nossal, was hostile:

Canadians persistently rejected the United States as a model society, persistently rejected American republicanism as an inappropriate means of governance, and persistently characterized the United States and Americans as a threat to the existence of Canada. The Loyalist ideology of anti-Americanism was built over the course of the nineteenth century, entrenched every generation by fresh quarrels with the United States.

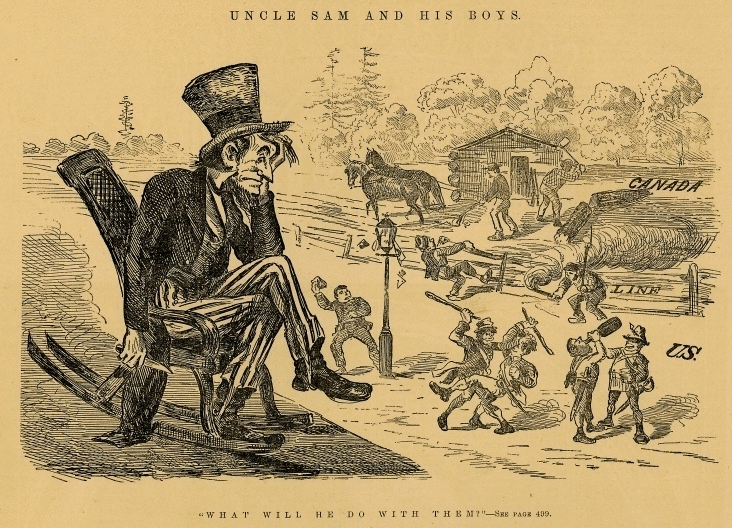
A 1870 Canadian political cartoon depicts Uncle Sam watching "his boys," with Canada in the background. Anti-American Canadian rhetoric of the time often depicted the US as chaotic in contrast to Canada.

Loyalists who sought refuge in Canada brought with them negative views of the new US republic, depicting it as a chaotic land of republican anarchy dominated by money, mob rule, and violence. This ideological opposition contributed to a national mythology that Canada was formed through the rejection of the American republic. Historians Norman Hillmer and Granatstein observed that the Loyalist population exhibited a "fanatical" determination to ensure Canada remained distinct from the US. While anti-Americanism in Canada from the mid-19th century to 1989 was largely economic, the loyalist narrative continues to influence Canadian views, with a 2005 Pew Research Center poll revealing Canadians were more likely than other Western respondents to describe Americans as violent and rude.

Until the mid-19th century, anti-Americanism in Canada stemmed from fears of US expansionism and its promotion of manifest destiny. The US Army's actions in Upper Canada during the War of 1812 fuelled "deep prejudice against the United States," in the colony after the conflict. The 1837–1838 rebellions, which involved pro-American elements and American volunteers, intensified these fears, leading to assaults on Americans in the Canadas. Anti-American sentiment during this period contributed to the union of the Province of Canada with Nova Scotia and New Brunswick to form Canadian Confederation in 1867.

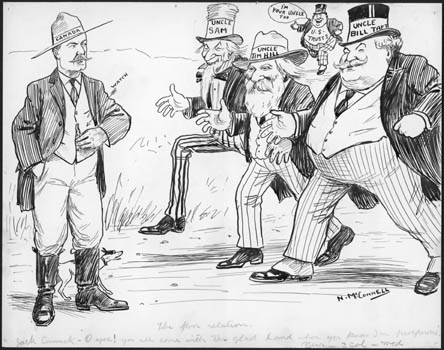
An early 20th century Canadian political cartoon depicting Johnny Canuck suspicious of Uncle Sam, US President William Taft, and US business interests.

From the end of the Fenian Raids in 1871 to the signing of the Canada–United States Free Trade Agreement (CUSFTA) in 1989, anti-Americanism in Canada was primarily driven by opposition to deeper economic integration with the US, as fears of military invasion had largely subsided. Granatstein argues that Canadian business interests, initially opposed to free trade, fuelled economic anti-Americanism until 1988. This sentiment played a pivotal role in the 1911 Canadian federal election, where Wilfrid Laurier's pro-free trade Liberals were defeated after the Conservative Party stoked anti-American fears. This helped legitimizing economic anti-Americanism in Canadian politics until the 1980s.

Economic anti-Americanism also spurred broader cultural anti-Americanism, as seen in the 1891 Canadian federal election. While the election focused explicitly on issues of free trade with the US, its underlying concerns, and the subsequent Conservative victory, reflected a wider rejection of American influence and an English Canada that "desperately wanted remain to British." Cultural anti-Americanism also influenced Canadian English, as Canadians favoured the use of Briticisms over American lexicon especially during periods of heightened tension with the US, such as during the Vietnam War.

Efforts by Canadian artists and cultural figures to assert a distinct national identity sometimes veered into cultural chauvinism, contributing to popular anti-American sentiment within the country. Early 20th-century Canadian intellectuals like Harold Innis, Donald Creighton and George Grant criticized US values of progress, technology, and mass culture, contrasting them with Canada's traditions of order and harmony.

The political shift away from economic anti-Americanism came in the 1980s, as Canadian businesses began to support free trade, leading to CUSFTA. By the 1990s, economic anti-Americanism had largely faded, with Granatstein arguing that economic integration made "othering" the Americans less persuasive. However, Nossal argues that a milder form persists as an attenuated device that "Canadians will employ to differentiate themselves from [the US]". This subdued anti-Americanism has been leveraged by politicians, particularly Jean Chrétien's Liberal Party from 1993 to 2003, and to a lesser extent by Paul Martin. Its use was particular successful for the party in its constituencies in Ontario.

John Herd Thompson and Stephen Randall have noted that anti-American sentiment continued to nourish Canadian identity into the early 21st century. However, Stuart argues that after the September 11 attacks, anti-Americanism in Canada diminished as "non-Americanism" became less central to the country's identity and as Canadians' social and cultural outlooks continued to diverge from those of the US.

A Fraser Institute study of Canadian Broadcasting Corporation coverage from 2001 to 2002 found it overwhelmingly critical of US policies and actions, suggesting it exacerbated anti-American sentiment. Anti-American sentiment on Canadian television was noted in US diplomatic cables that were leaked in 2008, where they noted that although anti-American sentiment wasn't a "public diplomatic crisis," it was indicative of the "insidious negative popular stereotyping" the US increasingly faced in Canada.

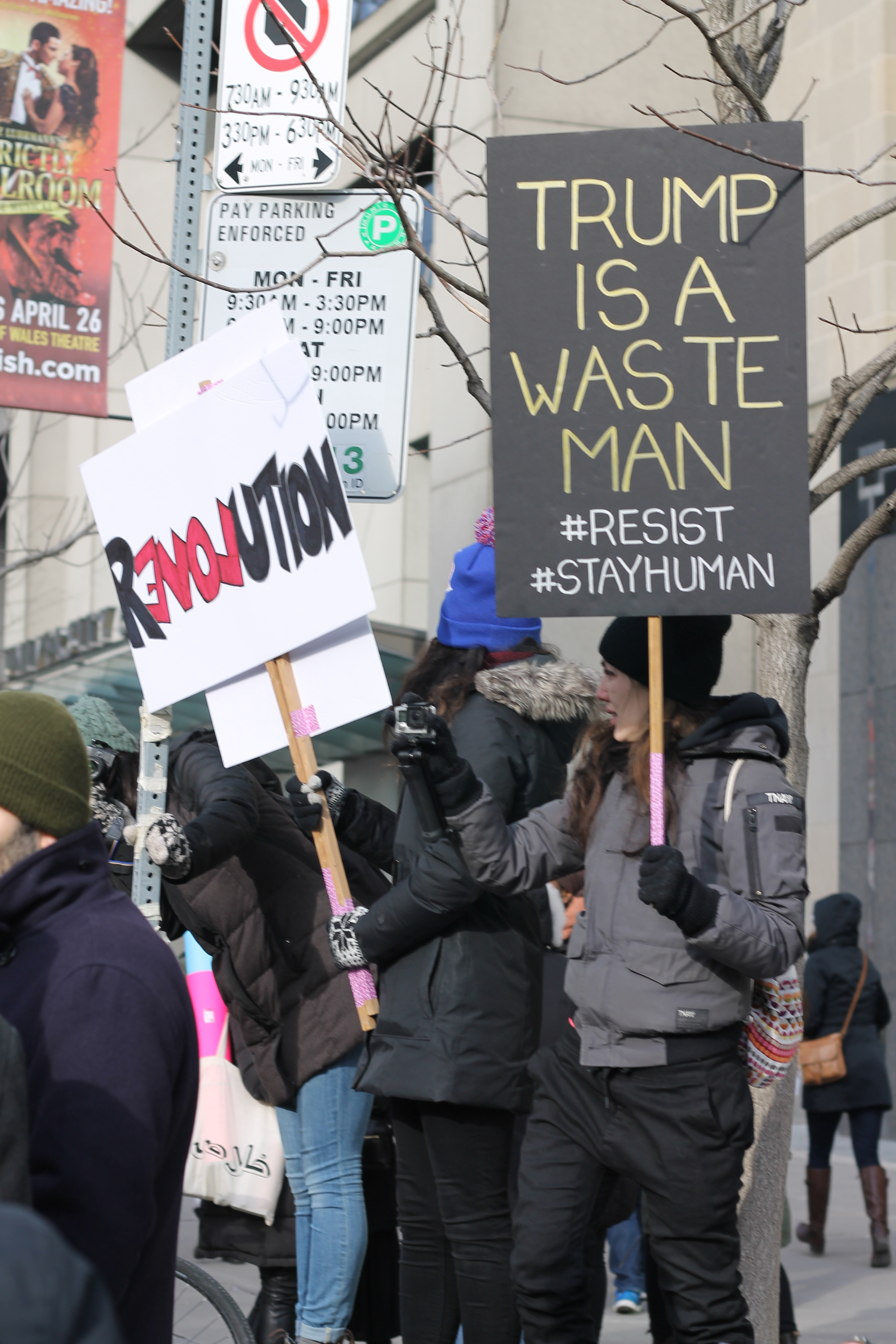
A demonstrator in Toronto holds up an anti-Trump sign in February 2016

Anti-American sentiment in Canada rose during the first presidency of Donald Trump. In 2017, Pew Research reported that 30% of Canadians viewed Americans negatively, and 58% opposed the spread of American ideas and customs. By 2018, dissatisfaction hit historic levels, with 56% expressing negative views of the US, spurred by Trump’s inflammatory comments and tariffs on Canada. This discontent led to organized boycotts of American goods and tourism.

Anti-Americanism also increased during the COVID-19 pandemic, with isolated incidents of vandalism and harassment targeting Americans in Canada taking place in 2020.

On February 1, 2025, Trump signed an executive order imposing 25% tariffs on Canada and Mexico, prompting Canada to announce retaliatory tariffs and product removals, triggering the 2025 United States trade war with Canada and Mexico. In the days that followed, Canadian fans at multiple sporting events featuring Canadian and American teams booed the American anthem in protest. A movement to boycott American goods emerged in Canada as a protest against the tariffs.

The repeated tariffs and annexation threats from Trump led to a surge in nationalistic, anti-American sentiment in Canada, influencing the 2025 federal election, where the Liberal Party under Mark Carney campaigned on an anti-Trump platform. Political scientist Guy Lachapelle observed that the 2025 surge in anti-American sentiment and the boycott of American goods was not against the United States, but more towards the American president Donald Trump. However, Christopher Sands, the director of the Canada Institute has stated that the dispute has reawakened Canadian anti-Americanism, and will remain salient long after the trade war is over. That was the sentiment expressed by delegates at the Halifax International Security Forum in November 2025. One noted Canadian historian, Bill Waiser, published an op-ed historical review in March 2025 in response to Trump's 51st state rhetoric, entitled "Americans have history of expecting Canada to fail, join U.S.".

=== Oceania ===
==== Australia ====
Australian anti-Americanism has been attributed to an "invasion mentality" arising from the perceived threat of American commercial dominance. By the mid-20th century, concerns over American influence on Australian culture and identity further shaped this sentiment. Unlike the philosophical anti-Americanism counterparts in Western Europe, Australian anti-Americanism is rooted in apprehensions about American encroachment.

Similar to other Anglophone countries, Australian anti-Americanism is mild and tempered by shared culture, language, and heritage; with the historian Bruce C. Daniels observing that Australians have experienced a complex mix of affection, affinity, annoyance, and anger toward American culture and power simultaneously.

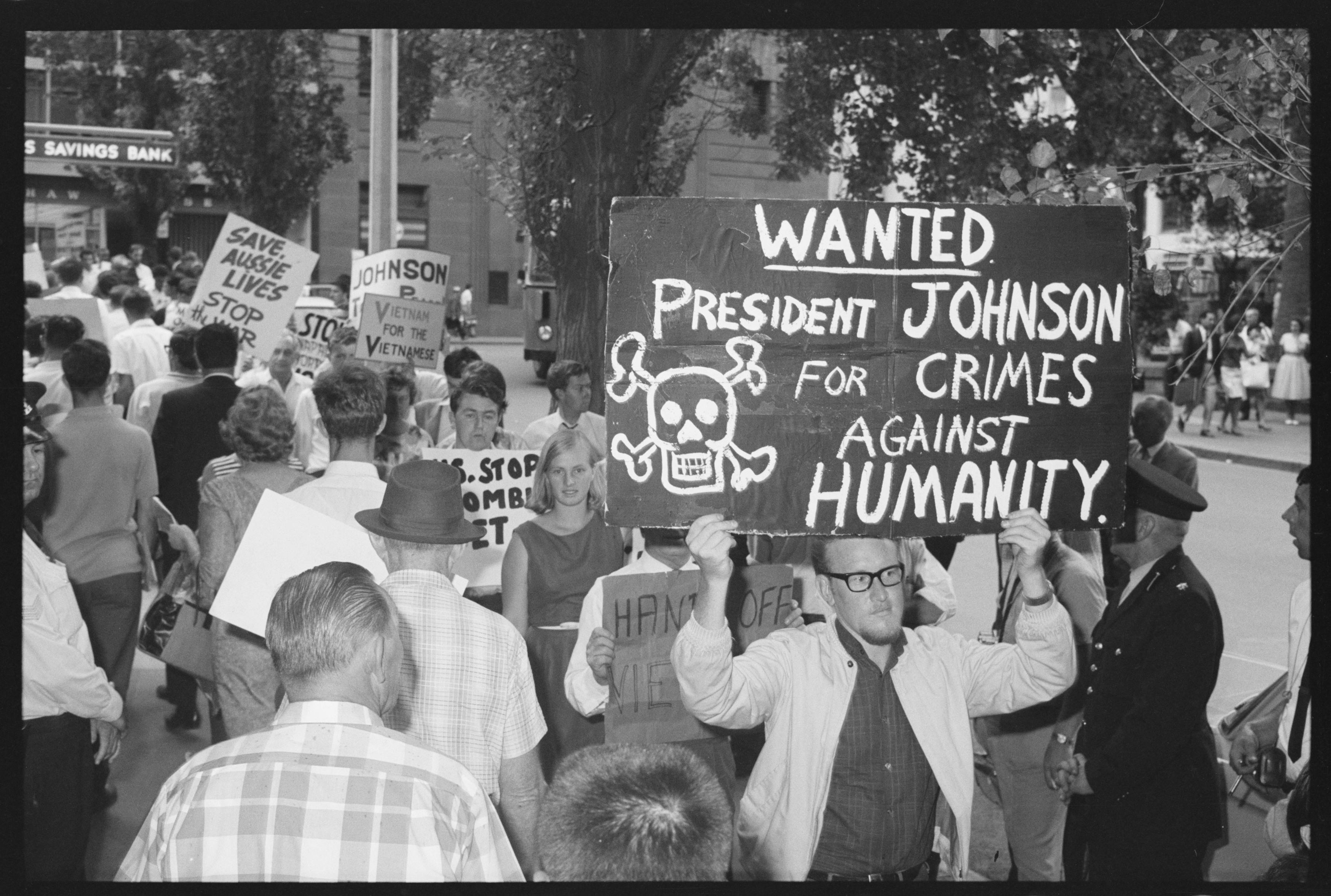
An anti-Vietnam War protest in Sydney, with a sign targeting U.S. President Lyndon B. Johnson, February 1966. Australian anti-Americanism is often tied to opposition to specific U.S. policies or administrations.

Anti-Americanism in Australia has often been shaped by specific U.S. administrations and policies, with opposition in the 1960s tied to the Vietnam War and in the early 2000s to U.S. President George W. Bush's foreign policy. Political scientist Ann Capling describes this as "contingent" anti-Americanism, akin to the "rational anti-Americanism" identified by sociologist Paul Hollander, where criticism is precipitated from U.S. actions perceived as harmful. It also extends to dissatisfaction with U.S. protectionist economic policies, amplified by Australia's trade deficit and dissatisfaction with what Australians perceive as "unfair" American trade practices.

===== History of anti-Americanism in Australia =====
Concerns over American economic influence in Australia emerged in the 1830s, driven by increased American whaling activity and the presence of a U.S. naval squadron along the Australian coastline in 1838. By the 1920s, growing American business activity sparked debates about the "Americanization" of Sydney and whether Australians could maintain a distinct identity from Americans.

While American-Australian cooperation during World War II and its aftermath dampened anti-American sentiment, it resurfaced during the Vietnam War. Anti-Americanism in Australia were found across the political spectrum, from Anglophile conservatives to radical socialists, united from a shared fear of growing U.S. influence and economic suspicion. Though some attribute modern anti-Americanism to the Vietnam War and "boorish" American tourists in Australia, historian Bruce C. Daniels argues the backlash reflects pre-existing resentment, temporarily masked by earlier periods of cooperation.

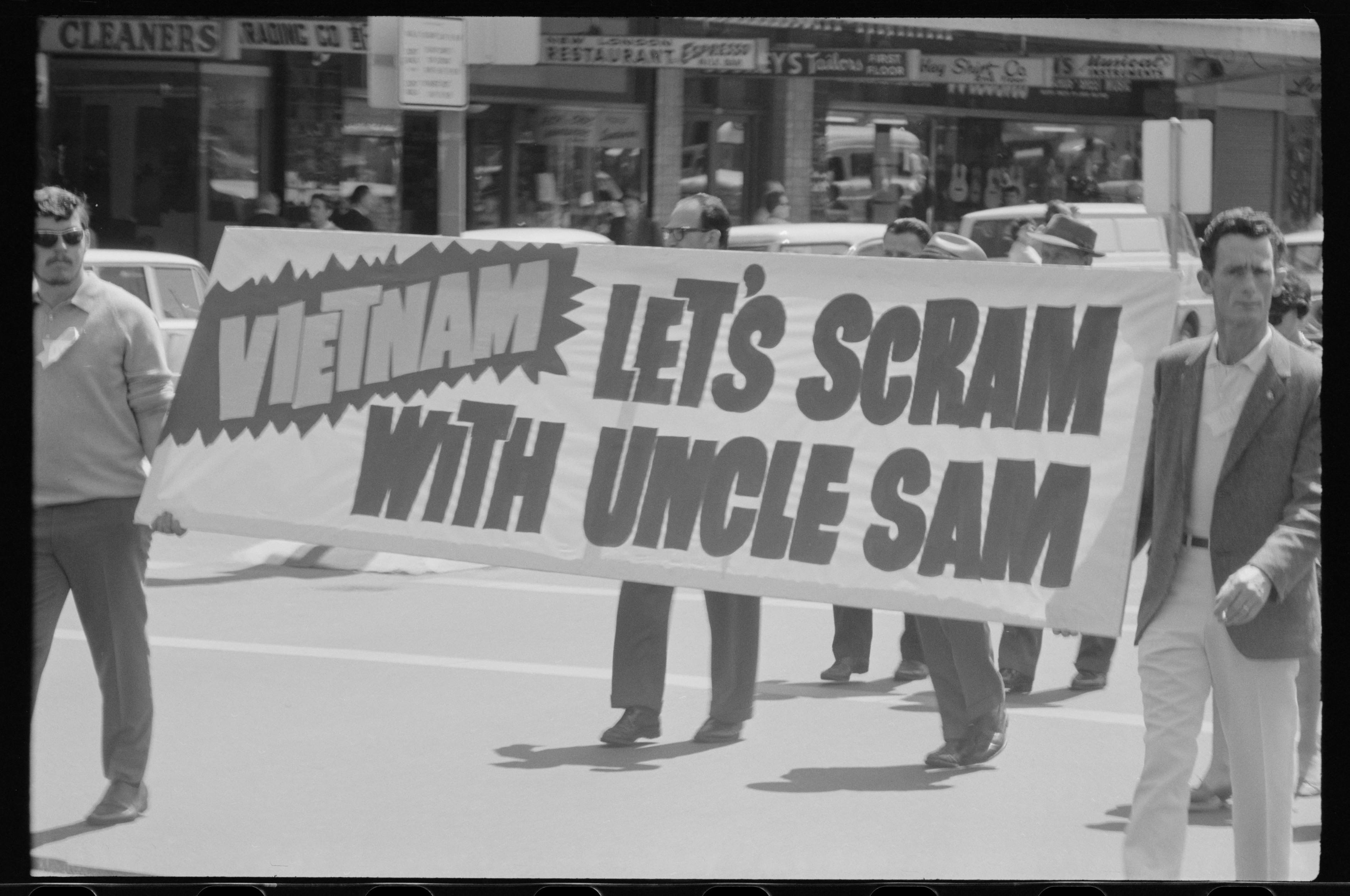
Members of the Australian Railways Union and Plasterers' Federation carry a banner which reads "let's scram with Uncle Sam", during an anti-Vietnam War protest in Sydney, 1969

The modern wave of protest literature against American influence in Australia began in the mid-1960s, driven by political economists on the far left. By 1970, anti-American discourse spread to moderates and even some conservatives. The "radical left" escalated its rhetoric against the Vietnam War, with groups like the Australian Union of Students endorsing the burning of U.S. flags on campuses. These sentiments also permeated the Australian Labor Party (ALP) as it strengthened ties with anti-Vietnam War groups. The ALP, emboldened by discontent over Australia's Vietnam War involvement and growing U.S. economic influence, eventually adopted an anti-Vietnam War stance and opposed further American dominance.

Anti-Americanism within the ALP peaked when Gough Whitlam's government came to power in 1972, although Whitlam tried to curb these factions. However, these elements gave rise to domestic partisan rhetoric that branded Whitlam as an "anti-American radical socialist," despite being an "amiable centrist." Anti-American sentiment surged briefly in 1975 when conspiracy theorists linked Whitlam's dismissal in 1975 to CIA machinations. After the ALP’s defeat and return to opposition, anti-Americanism diminished within the party. Though some left-wing elements still held these views, these sentiments were opposed and stifled by ALP leaders like Bob Hawke. Anti-Americanism briefly resurfaced under Mark Latham from 2003 to 2005, but his fall and the discrediting of his anti-American positions marked the end of serious public anti-American sentiment in the ALP.

Australian public opinion on the U.S. soured in the early 2000s, fuelled by disillusionment with the U.S.-led Global War on Terror. According to Peter Costello, then treasurer of Australia, anti-American sentiment in Australia saw a boost in 2003, due to Australia's participation in the U.S.-led Iraq War. Richard Alston, then Minister for Communications, Information Technology and the Arts, claimed that the Australian Broadcasting Corporation’s coverage of the war exhibited anti-American bias, though three inquiries found no evidence of this. The perceived rise in anti-American sentiment was echoed by Rupert Murdoch, an Australian-born American media mogul and owner of News Corp, in 2006.

While Australian opinion of the U.S. improved in the following years, a 2020 Lowy Institute poll revealed it reverted to 2006 levels due to the U.S.'s handling of the COVID-19 pandemic and Trump tariffs. According to a Pew Research poll in 2025, 29% of Australians held a favorable opinion of the United States, down from 40% in 2024, while 71% held an unfavorable opinion, up from 60% in 2024.

== Slogans ==
- Death to America
- Great Satan
- Seppo (slang)

== See also ==
- American exceptionalism
- Anti-Western sentiment
- Global arrogance
- Americanism (ideology)
- Covert U.S. regime change actions
- Criticism of the United States government
- Dedollarisation
- Euston Manifesto
- How the World Sees America
- Human rights in the United States
- Military history of the United States
- American imperialism
- Monetary hegemony
- Opposition to U.S. involvement in the Vietnam War
- Opposition to the Iraq War
- Pro-Americanism
- Racism in the United States
- United States and state terrorism
- Washington Obkom
- List of United States invasions of Latin American countries
