= My Sister's Place =

South Korean organization

- 두레방
- Formation: March 1986; 40 years ago
- Founder: Harriet Faye Moon
- Type: National NGO
- Purpose: supports women affected by prostitution in military camp towns
- Locations: Uijeongbu, South Korea, Dongducheon, South Korea,
- Region served: South Korea
- Website: durebang.org

My Sister's Place (RR: Durebang; MR: Turebang; Hangul: 두레방) is an advocacy and counseling group founded in March 1986 in Uijeongbu, South Korea. The group is a non-profit government organization that supports women involved and affected by prostitution in military camp towns. It focuses on improving the lives of women who have entered the sex industry in and around U.S. military base camp towns in Korea. Durebang work with women from diverse backgrounds—Korean-born, Russian, and Filipina women—challenging the militarism and exploitation in the camp town sex industry. The group provides online counseling, community outreach, English classes, Hangul classes, and legal rights classes to women.

Since 1955, U.S. troops have maintained a permanent presence in South Korea. The Korean government has long been accused of encouraging Korean women to have sex with military officials for the economic and political gain of the country as a whole. These military camp towns have been created and maintained by both the U.S. and Korean governments as a mutually beneficial enterprise for the state and notorious as a place where Korean and other foreign women give sexual services to American G.I.’s.

It was founded by Harriet Faye Moon, an American-born wife of Korean pastor Moon Dong-hwan, who is the brother of Reverend Moon Ik-hwan. Durebang's main office is in Uijeongbu near Camp Stanley. A branch office was built in Dongducheon, where Camp Nimble (closed in 2006), Camp Castle (closed in 2015), Camp Casey, and Camp Hovey are located. Durebang plans to relocate to Pyeongtaek, near Camp Humphreys, the largest U.S. overseas military base.

== Services ==
=== Classes ===
The organization offers several classes available to women to help develop their skills and resiliency. Every week, the center offers music classes using K-pop songs to teach Korean. In this class, they learn about music composition, production and unpacking the meaning of popular song lyrics. On a near daily basis, My Sister's Place offers classes to immigrant women to learn the Korean alphabet, Hangul, in an effort to achieve literacy and increase women's agency. Immigrant women who work in the camp-town sex industries often have little Korean language acquisition and low literacy skills. In providing this free service to women, the program hopes to empower women and provide a valuable economic and social resource. Additionally, a short-term English class is offered to learners who wish to acquire or improve their English language skills. English classes serve as an opportunity to study and practice communication skills, speaking, and pronunciation in a safe space.

=== Workshops ===
A living labor law workshop is also offered to help women gain understanding about complex laws—how can they apply them for their specific needs. The class provides an educational base in which women can learn some of the most important laws related to their condition and how they apply to them.

=== Outreach ===
My Sister's Place focuses its efforts on providing daily survival skills for women working in camp town areas. Their mission is to help women live genuine and autonomous lives through their newly acquired skillsets and education. In addition to the services described above, the organization develops programs that focus on cooking, child care services, basic knowledge about health and much more. One of the most valuable services they offer is the on-site and online counseling. This is offered several times in a month for in-person support. Moreover, My Sister's Place serves as a temporary shelter for domestic and transnational camp town women. The immediate support that the shelter provides enable women to find temporary safety until they can acquire their own permanent residence or fulfill their plan of action. Additionally, as a form of alternate employment for former military prostitutes, a bakery was opened where the women were employed. The bakery worked in partnership with a group of local college student activists who volunteers to deliver and sell the bread on campus. This allows the bakery to sustain itself and flourish. As a result, the bakery program has partially funded other program classes and services like daycare for the women's children.

== Political activism ==
My Sister's Place and related NGOs have become visible participants in kijich’on prostitution and kijich’on movement organizations. These organizations have worked to bring public consciousness about their advocacy and fight for policy change through the form of press, policy papers, and reports. One of their efforts was in denouncing the murder of Yoon Kum-Yi, and bringing public attention to the incident by organizing a large demonstration of 3,000 people. Yoon Kum-Yi who was a sex worker was brutally murdered and mutilated in October 1992 at Camp Casey in South Korea. She was murdered by a U.S. G.I. named Kenneth Markle, who subsequently became the first American soldier tried in a Korean criminal court for murder. The result of his trial was a life sentence which was later reduced to 15 years in federal prison.

== See also ==
- U.S. Military and Prostitution in South Korea
- Kijichon
