= 3rd Infantry Brigade, 2nd Infantry Division =

3rd Infantry Brigade
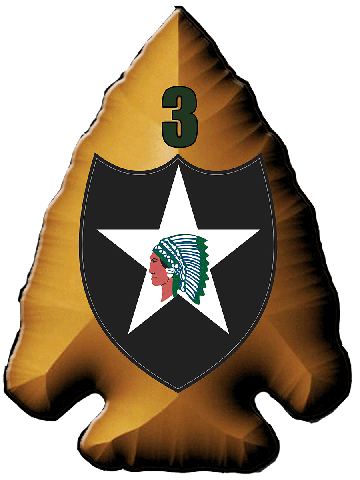
- Insignia of the 3rd Brigade 2nd Infantry
- Active: 1917–1941; 1962-2015
- Country: United States of America
- Branch: United States Army
- Type: Brigade
- Role: Infantry
- Garrison/HQ: South Korea (HQ), Fort Lewis
- Nickname: "Ghost Soldiers"
- Motto: Second to None
- March: Warrior March
- Engagements: World War I: Aisne; Aisne-Marne; St. Mihiel; Meuse-Argonne; World War II: Normandy; Northern France; Rhineland; Ardennes-Alsace; Central Europe; Korean War: Battle of Pusan Perimeter; Iraq War War in Afghanistan (2001–2021)

The 3rd Stryker Brigade Combat Team, 2nd Infantry Division was a brigade of the United States Army's 2nd Infantry Division.

At the time of its activation, the 2nd Infantry Division was composed of the 3rd Infantry Brigade, which included the 9th Infantry Regiment; the 23rd Infantry Regiment and the 5th Machine Gun Battalion; the 4th Marine Brigade; 2nd Brigade of field artillery; and various supporting units.

== History ==
The brigade was first organized as the 1st Provisional Brigade, a Regular Army unit, at Syracuse, New York, on 11 August 1917. It was re-designated as the 3rd Infantry Brigade of the 2nd Division on 22 September, a day after the latter was constituted.

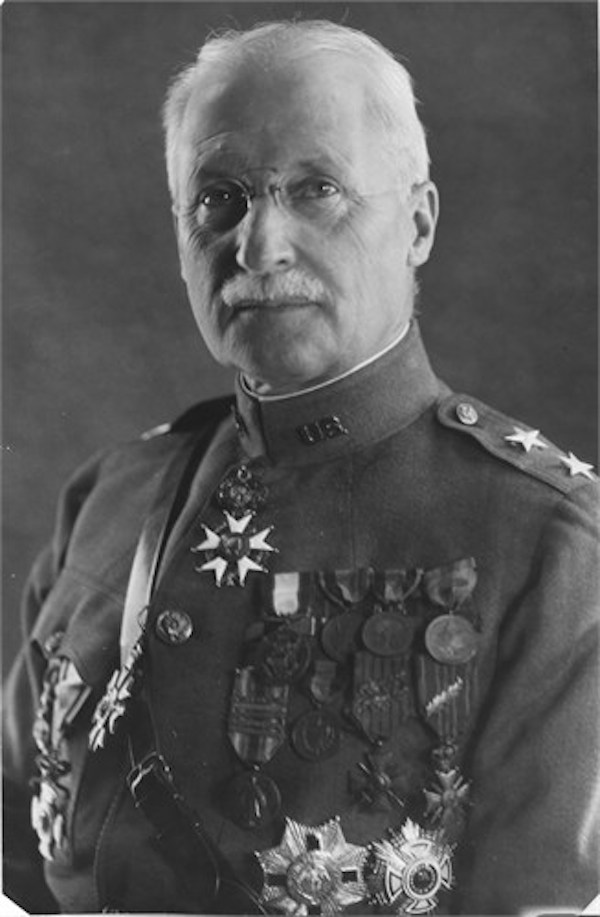
Edward Mann Lewis, with decorations

The 2nd Division was first constituted on 21 September 1917 in the Regular Army. It was organized on 26 October 1917 at Bourmont, Haute Marne, France. At the time of its activation, the Division was composed of the 3rd Infantry Brigade, which included the 9th Infantry Regiment; the 23rd Infantry Regiment and the 5th Machine Gun Battalion; the 4th Marine Brigade; 2nd Brigade of field artillery; and various supporting units.

The division spent the winter of 1917–18 training with French and Scottish veterans. Though judged unprepared by French tacticians, the American Expeditionary Force (AEF) was committed to combat in the spring of 1918 in a desperate attempt to halt a German advance toward Paris. Major General Edward Mann Lewis commanded the 3rd Brigade as they deployed to reinforce the battered French along the Paris to Metz road. The Division first fought at the Battle of Belleau Wood and contributed to shattering the four-year-old stalemate on the battlefield during the Château-Thierry campaign that followed.

On 28 July 1918, Marine Corps Major General John A. Lejeune assumed command of the 2nd Division and remained in that capacity until August 1919, when the unit returned to the US. The division went on to win hard-fought victories at Soissons and Blanc Mont. Finally it participated in the Meuse-Argonne Offensive which ended any German hope for victory. On 11 November 1918 the Armistice was declared, and the 2nd Division entered Germany, where it assumed occupation duties until April 1919. 2nd Division returned to U.S. in July 1919.

The 2nd Division was three times awarded the French Croix de guerre for gallantry under fire at Belleau Wood, Soissons, and Blanc Mont. This entitles current members of the division and of those regiments that were part of the division at that time (including the 5th and 6th Marine Regiments) to wear a special lanyard, or fourragère, in commemoration.

The division lost 1,964 (including USMC: 4,478) killed in action and 9,782 (including USMC: 17,752) wounded in action.

=== Interwar years ===
Upon returning to the United States, the division was stationed in Texas at Camp Bullis and Fort Sam Houston. It was one of only three divisions to remain intact and on active duty for the entire interwar period. It remained there for the next 23 years, serving as an experimental unit, testing new concepts and innovations for the Army. The 2nd Division was selected as the first unit to be reorganized under the new triangular organization 1939 – 1941.

==== Brigade inactivation ====
Following the interwar years at Fort Sam Houston, Texas, the Army began reorganizing its structure from a "square" division (which utilized brigades) to a "triangular" division (which eliminated the brigade echelon entirely to favor three standalone regiments).

- The brigade headquarters was disbanded/inactivated, leaving it with no assigned personnel.

=== Reorganization ===
Following the Korean War armistice, the division remained on duty in Korea until 1954, when it was reduced to near-zero strength. Its colors were subsequently transferred to Fort Lewis, Washington, where the 44th Infantry Division was reflagged as the Second in October 1954. This structural realignment was short-lived; on 8 November 1957, the Department of the Army announced that the division would be inactivated.

In the spring of 1958, the Department of the Army announced that the 2nd Infantry Division would be reformed at Fort Benning, Georgia, with personnel and equipment of the 10th Infantry Division returning from Germany. Fort Benning remained the home of the new 2nd Infantry Division from 1958 to 1965, where they were initially assigned the mission of a training division. In March 1962 the 2ID was designated as a Strategic Army Corps (STRAC) unit. Following this the division intensified combat training, tactical training, and field training exercises, in addition to special training designed to improve operational readiness. In 1963, the division was reorganized for operational integration with the 11th Air Assault Division (Test).

=== Korea ===
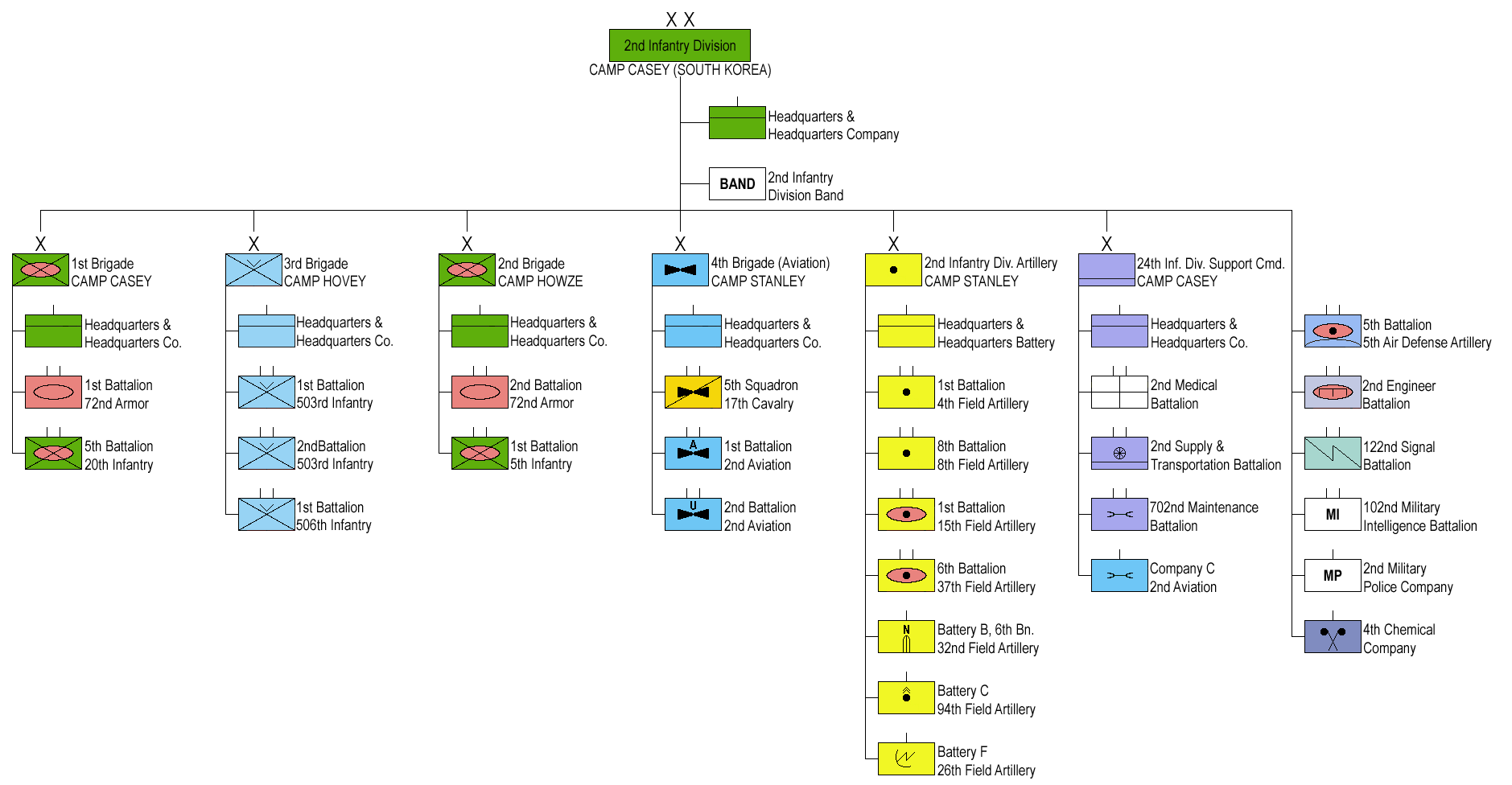
2nd US Infantry Division 1989

As a result of the formation of the 1st Cavalry Division (Airmobile) at Fort Benning in 1965, the 2nd Infantry Division's stateside unit, along with 11th Air Assault Division's personnel and equipment, were merged to form a new formation, and the existing 1st Cavalry Division in Korea took on the title of the 2nd Infantry Division.

The division formally returned to Korea in July 1965. The 2nd Infantry Division was headquartered at Tonggu Ri and was responsible for watching over a portion of the DMZ. The 3rd Brigade was headquartered at Camp Young until 1971 when it relocated to Camp Howze.

From 1966 onwards the Korean DMZ Conflict (1966–69) increased. On 2 November 1966, soldiers of the 1st Battalion, 23d Infantry Regiment were killed in an ambush by North Korean forces. In 1967 enemy attacks in the Korean Demilitarized Zone (DMZ) increased, as a result, 16 American soldiers were killed that year.

In 1968 North Koreans continued to probe across the DMZ, and in 1969, while on patrol, four soldiers of 3d Battalion, 23d Infantry were killed. On 18 August 1976, during a routine tree-trimming operation within the Truce Village (the Joint Security Area) were axed to death in a melee with North Korean border guards which became known as the Korean axe murder incident. On 21 August, following the deaths, elements of the division took part in "Operation Paul Bunyan" to cut down the "Panmunjeom Tree". This effort was conducted by Task Force Brady (named after the 2nd ID Commander) in support of Task Force Vierra (named after the Joint Security Area Battalion commander).

==== Brigade inactivation ====
Congress adopted the Nunn-Warner Amendment to the 1989 Defense Appropriation Bill, which ordered a reduction in U.S. troop strength in Korea from 43,000 to 36,000 by the end of calendar year 1991. As a result, on 16 September 1992, the brigade was inactivated at Camp Howze.

=== Casing of the Colors ===
On 5 September 2015, the Army retired the 3rd Brigade, 2nd Infantry Division flag, and the unit was re-designated as the 1st Brigade, 2nd Infantry Division.

== Iraq ==
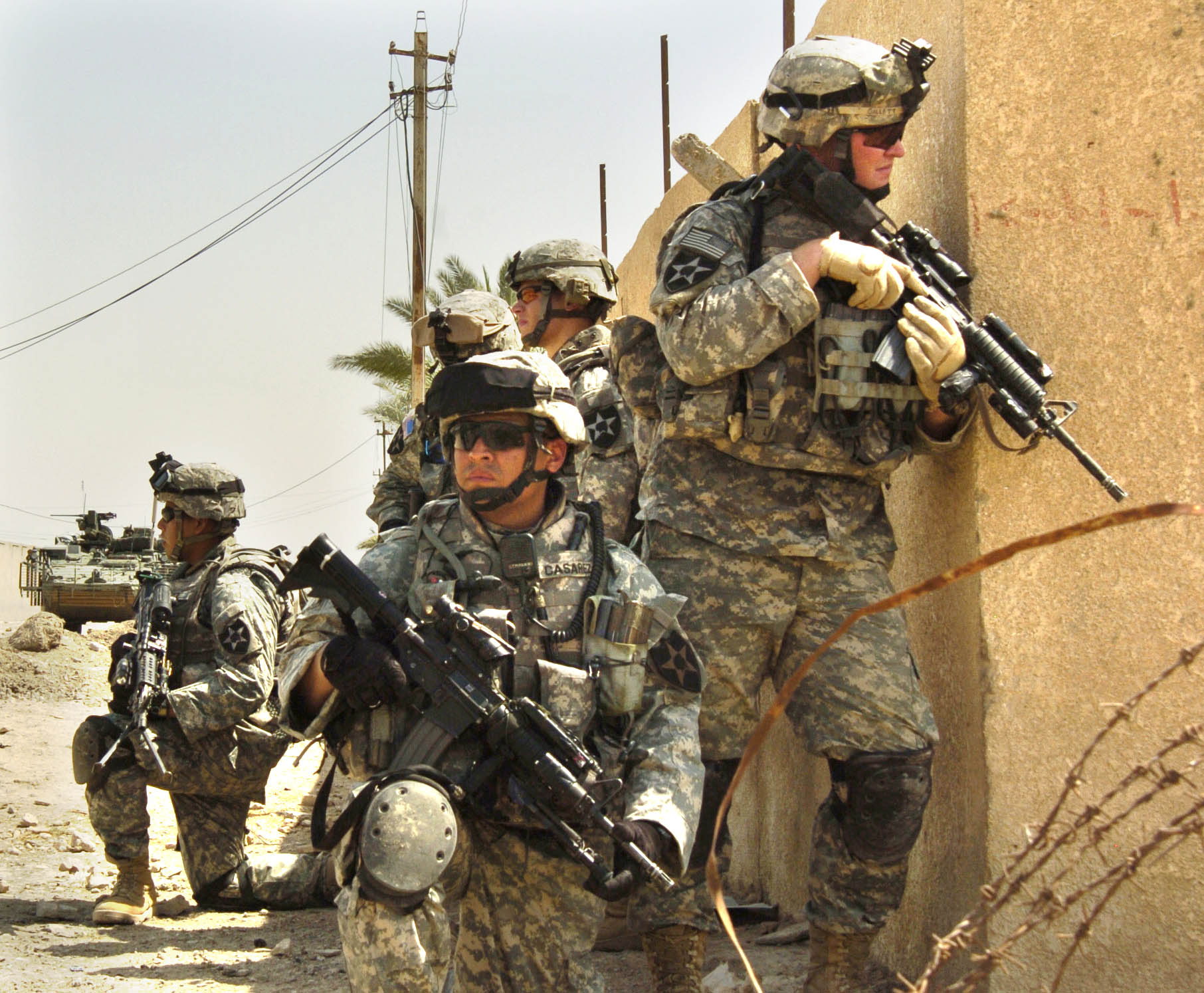
2ID soldiers patrolling in Baghdad.

From November 2003 to November 2004, the 3rd Stryker Brigade Combat Team deployed from Fort Lewis, Washington in support of Operation Iraqi Freedom. In the sands of Iraq the 3rd Brigade Stryker Brigade Combat Team proved the value of the Stryker brigade concept in combat and logistics operations.

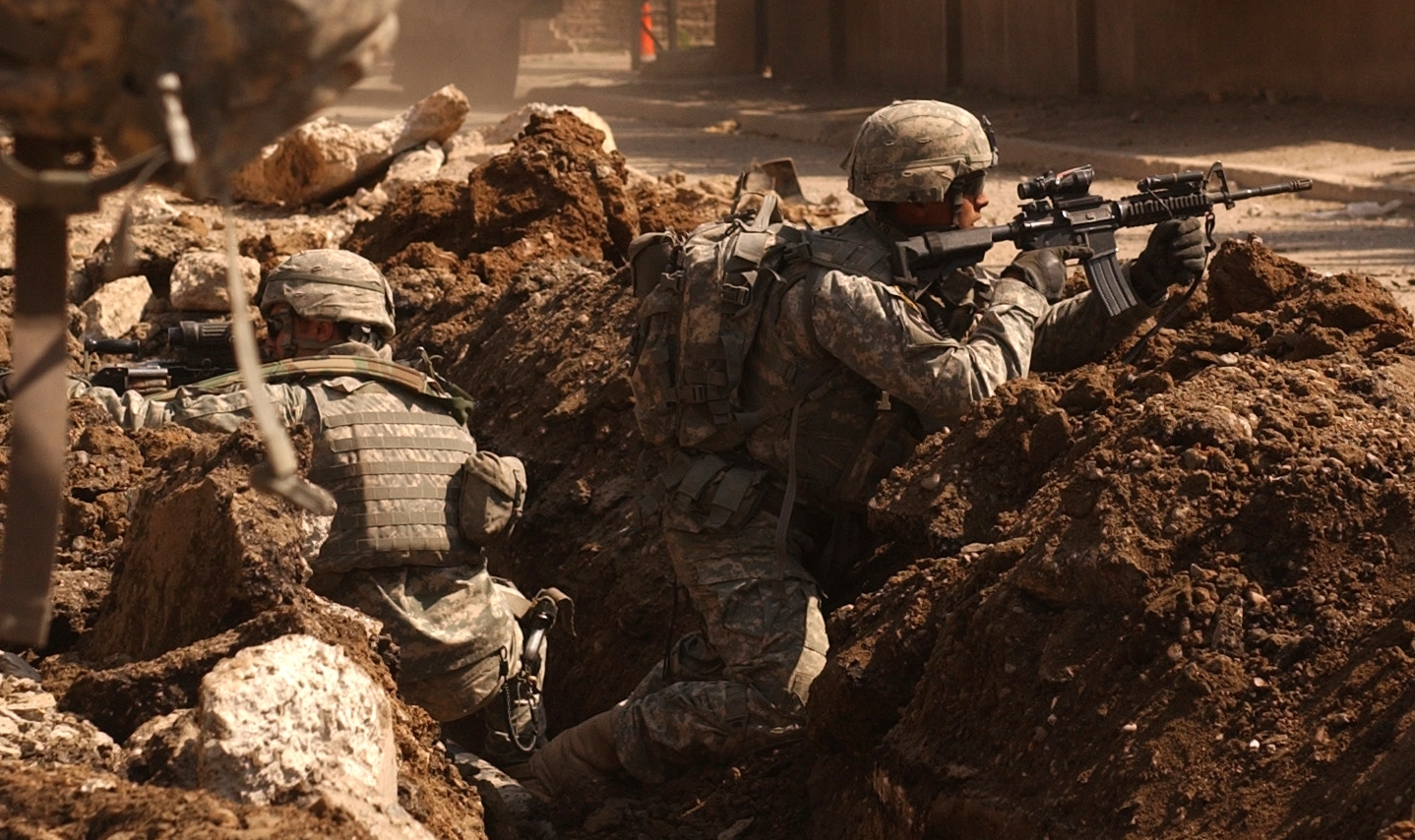
U.S. soldiers take cover during a firefight with insurgents in the Dora section of Baghdad 7 March 2007

From June 2006 to September 2007, the 3rd Stryker Brigade Combat Team deployed from Fort Lewis, Washington in support of Operation Iraqi Freedom. During the 3rd Stryker Brigade's second deployment to Operation Iraqi Freedom their mission was to assist the Iraqi security forces with counter-insurgency operations in the Ninewa Province. Following a second RIP (Relief in Place) with 172nd SBCT, the BDE split between the bridge proper and 1st BDE, 1st CAV DIV. The respective units were based out of Balad, Taji, and Greater Baghdad. The bulk of the 46 soldiers that were killed in action during the deployment, occurred during this time frame.

On 1 June 2006 at Fort Lewis, Washington the 4th Brigade, 2d Infantry Division was formed. From April 2007 to July 2008 the 4th Stryker Brigade Combat Team was deployed in as part of the surge to regain control of the situation in Iraq. The brigade assumed responsibility for the area north of Baghdad and the Diyala province. 35 soldiers from the brigade were killed during the deployment.

From October 2006 to January 2008, the 2nd Infantry Brigade Combat Team deployed from Fort Carson, Colorado in support of the Multi-National Division – Baghdad (1st Cavalry Division) and was responsible for assisting the Iraqi forces to become self-reliant, bringing down the violence and insurgency levels and supporting the rebuilding of the Iraqi infrastructure. 43 soldiers from the brigade were killed during the deployment.

SSG Christopher B. Waiters of 5th Battalion, 20th Infantry Regiment, 3d Brigade Combat Team was awarded the Distinguished Service Cross on 23 October 2008 for his actions on 5 April 2007 when he was a specialist. Shortly after, SPC Erik Oropeza of the 4th Battalion, 9th Infantry Regiment, 4th Brigade Combat Team Thus the division will be credited with the 17th and 18th Distinguished Service Cross awardings since 1975.

The 2nd Infantry Division's 4th Brigade Combat Team deployed to Iraq in the fall of 2009.

3rd Brigade deployed to Iraq 4 August 2009 for the brigade's third deployment to Iraq, the most of any Stryker Brigade Combat Team (SBCT).

== Afghanistan ==
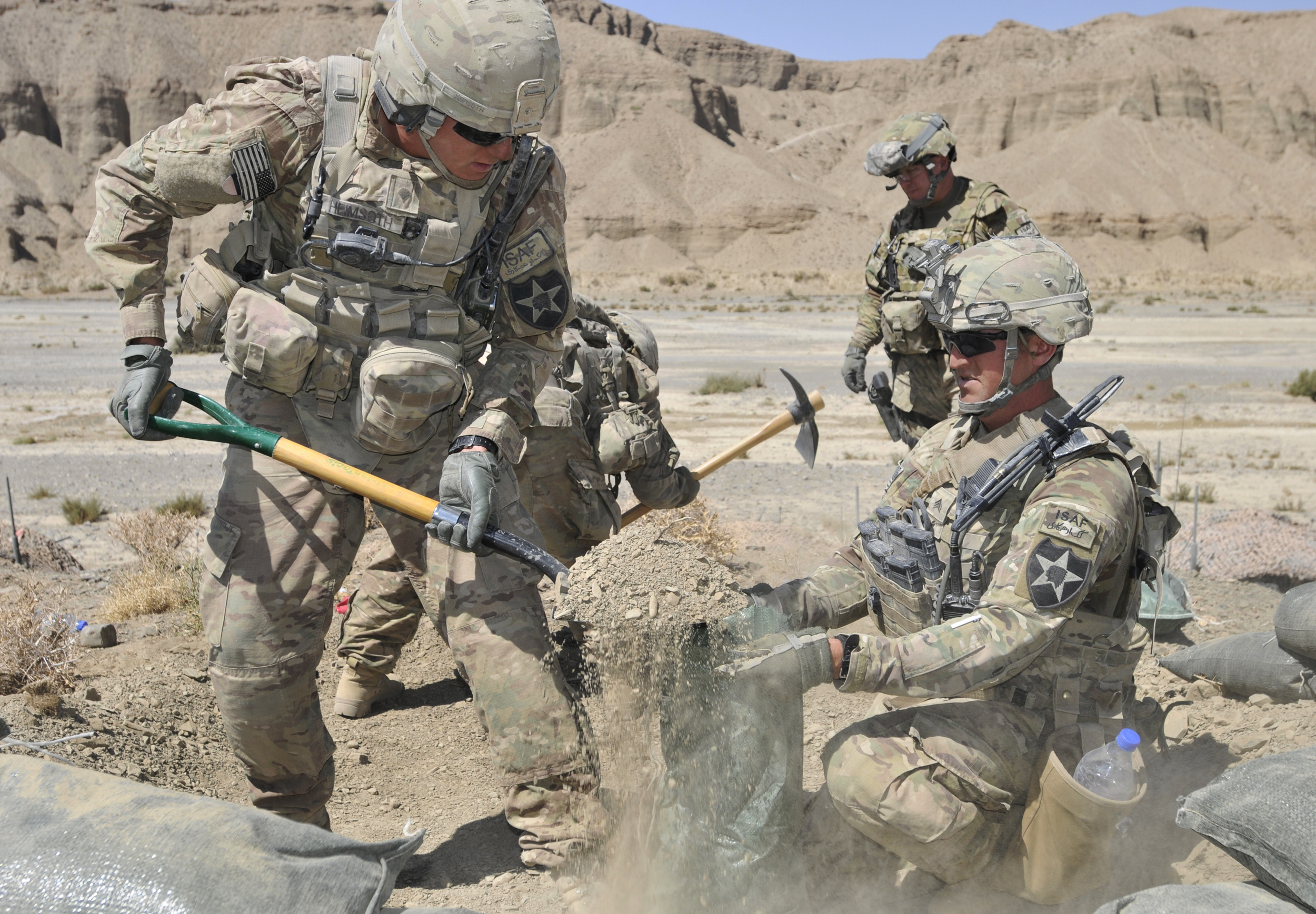
Spc. Justin Heimsoth (left) and Sgt. Chris Hagen fill sandbags for a machine gun position during Operation Southern Fist in Afghanistan's Spin Boldak district, 29 Sept. 2012. Both soldiers are infantrymen with the 2nd Infantry Division's 5th Battalion, 20th Infantry Regiment.

On 17 February 2009, President Barack Obama ordered 4,000 soldiers from the 5th Stryker Brigade Combat Team to Afghanistan, along with 8,000 Marines. Soldiers are being sent there because of the worsening situation in the Afghan War. These soldiers were deployed in the southeast, on the Afghanistan-Pakistan border. During deployment, 35 soldiers were killed in combat, two others were killed in accidents, and 239 were wounded. In July 2010, the 5th Stryker Brigade Combat Team was inactivated and reflagged as the 2nd Stryker Brigade Combat Team. The brigade's Special Troops Battalion was also inactivated and reflagged and the rest of the subordinate units were reassigned to the reactivated 2nd SBCT.

3rd SBCT deployed in December 2011 and served in Afghanistan for one-year. 16 soldiers from the brigade lost their lives during the deployment. They were joined by their sister Stryker brigade, the 2nd SBCT in the spring 2nd Brigade returned around December 2012 and January 2013 having lost eight soldiers during deployment. The 4th Stryker BCT also deployed to its first deployment to the country in fall 2012 and returned in summer 2013 having lost four soldiers.

== Locations ==
- Camp Red Cloud (Division Command) – Uijeongbu City
  - Camp Casey – Dongducheon City, 45 miles north of Seoul; 17 miles south of DMZ
  - Camp Hovey – adjacent to Camp Casey
  - Camp Castle – near Camp Casey
  - Camp Mobile – adjacent to Camp Casey
  - Camp Stanley – part of Camp Red Cloud garrison
  - Camp Humphreys – near Pyeongtaek City, South of Seoul
  - Camp Carroll - Daegu
  - Fort Lewis – Tacoma, Washington
  - K-16 - South Korea near USAG Yongsan
