= The Women Outside: Korean Women and the U.S. Military =

1995 South Korean documentary film

The Women Outside: Korean Women and the U.S. Military is a 60 minute 1995 documentary film created by film/video makers Hye Jung Park and J.T. Takagi. The film details the experiences of South Korean women who work in U.S. military camptown brothels, bars, or clubs, exposing how the South Korean government and U.S. military mutually benefit from the sexual exploitation of women.

== Synopsis ==
The film documents the lives of Korean women working around military bases in both South Korea and the U.S. through one-on-one interviews, as well as through commentary from U.S. soldiers, U.S. and Korean academics, and individuals attempting to counteract the violent sexual exploitation specified by the film. While the Korean War ended in 1953, as of 1995, 37,000 U.S. military personnel were stationed in this region, where more than 27,000 women perform sexual labor in or around military camptowns.

As one woman, Yang Hyang Kim, relays in the film, many poor women in South Korea sought work to help support their families and were sold into or tricked into working in the military sex industry — trapped by debt, threat, or use of physical force. Poor economic circumstance is the primary reason Korean women work around U.S. bases. Professor Elaine Kim of the University of California, Berkeley explains in the film that there is very little room for social mobility in South Korea as well, especially for young women.

Even when South Korean women are able to escape these conditions, Korean social norms cause many to face rejection from their families, feel shame, and potentially drive them to return to military camptown life. The South Korean government also exercises a considerable degree of control over which populations can access the bars and clubs around U.S. bases. The majority of Korean people cannot enter these spaces — they are designated for non-citizens of Korea and the Korean women who "service" them. Women working in these conditions face further stigmatization due to the fact that only they, not the soldiers, are subject to testing for sexually transmitted diseases or infections.

The film also portrays the abuse and neglect experienced by Korean women who date or marry U.S. soldiers. For women with interracial children resulting from sexual relations with U.S. soldiers, the social sphere is even more hostile. The Duraebang Community Center is one facility featured in the film which was opened to support camptown sex workers, including those who marry U.S. soldiers they meet while working in the camptowns. Alternatively, the USO Bride School is featured in the documentary as a facility that teaches Korean wives — or soon to be wives — of U.S. soldiers about American culture.

The survivalist approaches and perseverance of South Korean women working in the military sex industry is also emphasized in the documentary. It covers protests and demonstrations organized by groups like the Duraebang Community Center, particularly highlighting the violent murder of Yoom Kum-Yi by U.S. soldier Kenneth Markle at Camp Casey, South Korea in Dongducheon. A similar justice campaign highlighted covers the wrongful sentencing of Chong Sun France, a Korean woman living in the U.S. whose youngest child died while unattended when she had to leave her two children to go to work in a Jacksonville bar. Compiling these battles for justice with personal testimonies from women who work or have worked around U.S. military bases, the film confronts South Korean and U.S. military policy and the intricate role both play in the forced exploitation of Korean women's sexual labor.

== Production ==
The film was produced by Third World Newsreel.

== Interviewees ==
- Jun Mi Han
- Yang Hyang Kim (Yang Hyang Kim Kruse)
- Professor Jang-Hie Lee
- Professor Heisoo Shin
- Bok Sun Oh
- Professor Elaine Kim
- Yoon Mi Lim
- Yon-Ja Kim
- Professor Cynthia Enloe
- Rr. Admiral Carroll Jr.
- Lt. Colonel Griffin D. Lockett
- Sun-Young Chung
- Yvonne Y. Park
- Capt. Todd Kruse
- William H. Daly
- Norman Dion
- Chong Sun France
- C. Dewey Hudson
- Sook Min Mullinax
- Susan White
- Paul Suhr
- Dr. Steven Sohn

== Reception ==
The documentary was praised by Los Angeles Times, The Boston Globe, and academics for its illumination of the military sex industry in South Korea.

In 1997 the film was also aired on PBS as a part of the "P.O.V." series.

== Awards ==
1997 New York Expo

- Gold Award
