= Camp Howze =

Camp Howze can mean either of two US Army bases:

- Camp Howze, Texas
- Camp Howze, South Korea
