= Murder of Yun Geum-i =

1992 murder in South Korea by US soldier

- Yun Geum-i
- Location: Dongducheon, Gyeonggi Province, South Korea
- Date: 28 October 1992
- Victim: Yun Geum-i
- Perpetrator: Kenneth Lee Markle III
- Verdict: Guilty
- Convictions: Murder

On 28 October 1992, 26-year-old South Korean sex worker Yun Geum-i (Korean: 윤금이; Hanja: 尹今伊) was sexually assaulted and murdered by a U.S. serviceman at a camp town in Dongducheon, Gyeonggi Province, South Korea. It was the first time an American GI had been turned over to the Korean courts for a crime committed against a Korean sex worker.

Due to the brutality of the abuse, the case attracted public attention and created outrage, sparking a new wave of anti-American sentiment and further scrutiny of the burden the U.S. military put on Korean cities. It also activated advocacy towards reviewing the U.S.–South Korea Status of Forces Agreement.

== Murder ==
In 1992, Yun Geum-i, a kijichon (camptown) sex worker in the city Dongducheon, was killed by U.S. Private Kenneth Lee Markle III. He was a medic in the 2nd Infantry Division at Camp Casey. Yun's dead body was found by her landlord with a soda bottle stuffed into her vagina and an umbrella up her rectum, the entire crime scene doused in laundry detergent under Markle's mistaken belief it would act as lye to destroy evidence.

== Aftermath ==
There were demonstrations and riots outside both Camp Casey and Camp Hovey following the news of the crime. In response to the murder, a group of forty-six Korean non-governmental organizations formed an umbrella organization called the National Campaign for the Eradication of Crime by U.S. Troops in Korea. They found that American Soldiers in Korea had committed 39,452 criminal offenses between the years 1967 and 1998, with 850 crimes committed in the same year as Yun's murder as well.

Markle was held at an American military confinement facility before and during his trial and appeals. A South Korean court sentenced Markle to life in prison in April 1993. In August 1993, the U.S. government gave compensation to the victim's family of about US$72,000. That December, an appeals court upheld Markle's conviction but reduced his sentence to 15 years in light of the U.S. government's compensation payment. Markle was transferred to Cheonan prison to begin serving his sentence on 17 May 1994. In 1995, he was fined 2 million won (US$2,000) for causing a disturbance in prison. He was released on parole on 14 August 2006, and deported to the U.S. His seven previous applications for parole were all rejected. Markle was arrested for less serious crimes, including burglary, in Maryland. He died on 14 February 2023.

== See also ==
- 1995 Okinawa rape incident
- Anti-American sentiment in Korea
- Status of forces agreement: Host nation concerns
- United States military and prostitution in South Korea
- Yangju highway incident
