= Camp Howze, South Korea =

Former United States Army post in Bongilchon, South Korea

Coordinates: 37°44′47.4″N 126°49′18.9″E

Camp Howze was a United States Army post in Bongilchon, South Korea. It was deactivated and turned over to the South Korean Army in 2005, and converted into an art museum in 2026.

== History ==
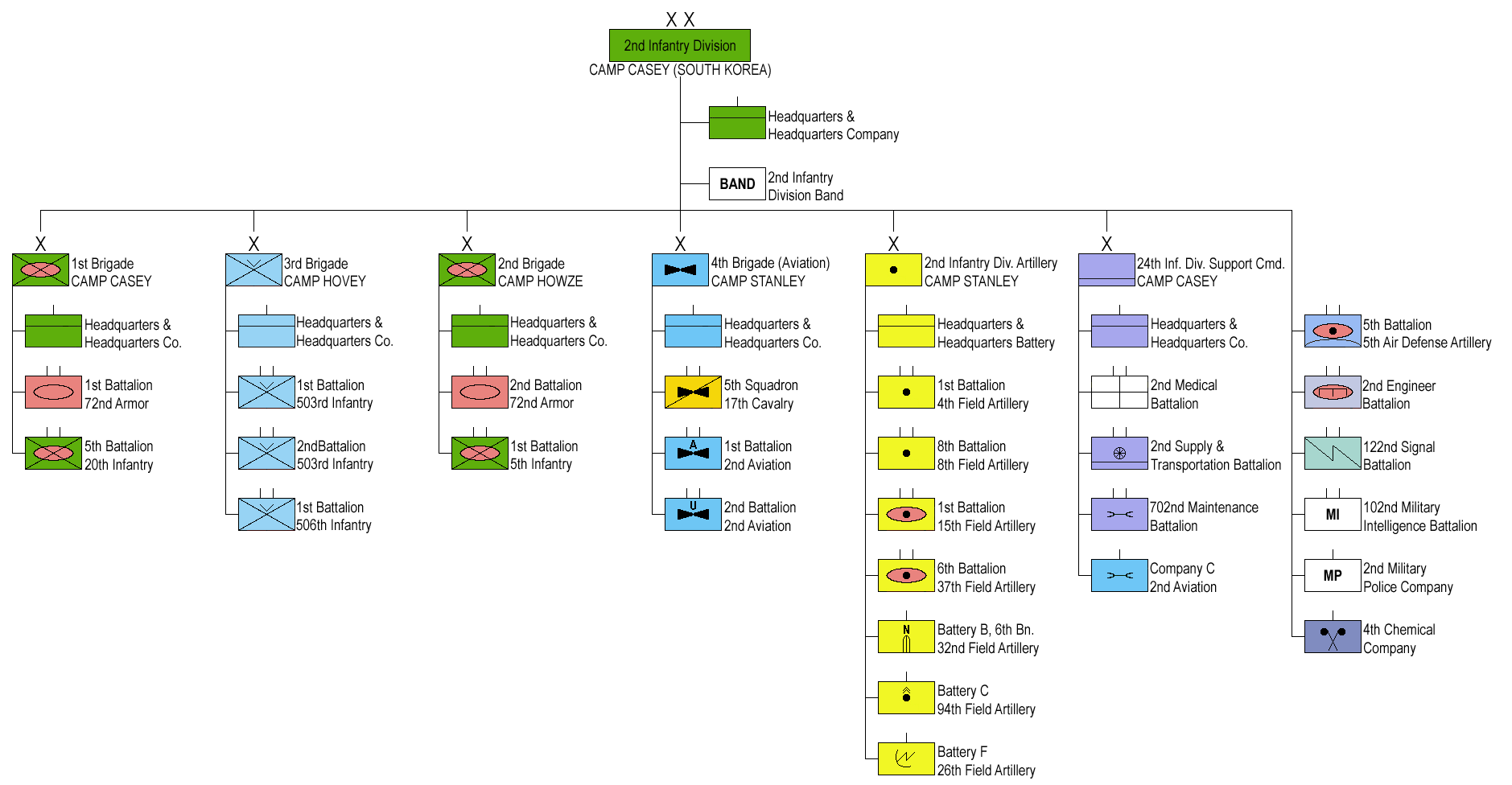
2nd US Infantry Division 1989

Originally a US Marine Corps—divisional level—command post for the 1st Marine Division 1953–1955, named Tonggu.

In 1955, when the Marines departed Korea, the 24th Infantry Division of the US Army placed their headquarters on the site. In 1957 the camp became the division headquarters for the 1st Cavalry Division, which in 1960 named the camp after Major General Howze, who had organized and trained the division from 1921 to 1925. The division was re-flagged (Note: Administrative reflagging (officially known as a "transfer less personnel and equipment"), human beings, weapons, vehicles, and barracks did not move.) as the 2nd Infantry Division in 1965.

The Active United States Army Worldwide in April 1968 — By Major Command and Location
Major Command	Location	Infantry	Armor
2d Infantry Div	Tonggu Ri	1. 2/38, 2/9 (M); 2. 1/9, 3/23; 3. 1/38, 1/23 (M), 2/23 (M)	1/72, 2/72

=== 3rd Brigade HQ ===
In 1971 it became the headquarters for the 3rd Infantry Brigade of the 2nd Infantry Division. "The 3rd Brigade was responsible for the security of the United Nations delegation at Panmunjom and for the security of the American sector of the Demilitarized Zone."

Before 1971, the brigade headquarters was located at Camp Young. When the 7th Infantry Division was withdrawn from South Korea in 1971, a consolidation along the DMZ occurred:

- The 2nd Infantry Division moved its main command out of Camp Howze and relocated north to Camp Casey (which had been vacated by the 7th Division).
- With Camp Howze now empty, the Brigade moved its headquarters from Camp Young.

The 3rd Brigade remained at Camp Howze until its inactivation on 1 October 1992 and when the Engineer Brigade, 2nd Infantry Division placed their headquarters at Camp Howze.

=== Deactivation ===
At the time of its deactivation in 2005, Camp Howze was the home of the Headquarters and Headquarters Detachment (HHD), Engineer Brigade, Second Infantry Division and the 44th Engineer Battalion. However, the 44th had participated in the deployment of the 2nd Brigade Combat Team, Second Infantry Division, in August 2004, in support of Operation Iraqi Freedom and was subsequently redeployed to Fort Carson, Colorado, and did not return to Camp Howze.

On 12 September 2018, a dedication ceremony was held for the Omma Poom park, which was constructed on the site of the former Camp Howze.

In 2026, the Pyeongwha Museum S827 opened its doors in a historic U.S. Army Post Exchange (PX) building at Camp Howze. Its spacious halls serve as a regional public arts and peace center, hosting rotating contemporary art and history exhibitions.

=== Camp garrisons ===
It was a garrison for the 1st Battalion of the 31st Infantry Regiment, (Note: With the exception of B Company which was garrisoned at Camp Edwards in a separate compound on the east side of National Route 1—hence, "Camp Edwards East"—with "Camp Edwards West" being Camp Edwards proper.) the 1st Battalion was re-flagged (i.e., re-designated) as the 5th Infantry in 1987.

In 2026, the Pyeongwha Museum S827 opened its doors in a historic U.S. Army Post Exchange (PX) building at Camp Howze.

== Location ==
The site of Camp Howze originated with the 1st Marine Division's establishment of a command post at Tonggu. (Note: Additionally noted in simplified Chinese: 同 囗 on the Map of Korea, AMS Series L751.: Korean: 동구; Hanja: 洞口; MR: Tonggu —read as Dong-gu in Korean (McCune–Reischauer mandated that an initial ㄷ be written with a T) and literally translates to "the gateway of the village district" or "the valley entrance".; 洞 (Dong): In traditional Korean administration (and heavily utilized during the Japanese colonial period from 1910 to 1945), a Dong or Tong was a local neighborhood, village unit, or a natural valley settlement. 口 (Gu): Means an opening or gateway.)

Camp Howze spanned three ri administrative districts located in Jori-eup, which is a sub-administrative district of Paju-si, Gyeonggi-do:

- Front gate: Bongilcheon-ri (봉일천리)
- Noejo-ri (뇌조리)
- Janggok-ri (장곡리)

== In popular culture ==
Camp Howze was featured in Larry Bond's Red Phoenix, a 1989 techno thriller.

== See also ==
- List of United States Army installations in South Korea
