= Wangbangsan =

Mountain in South Korea

Coordinates: 37°53′48″N 127°09′21″E

Highest point
- Elevation: 737 m (2,418 ft)

Geography
- Location: South Korea

Korean name
- Hangul: 왕방산
- Hanja: 旺方山
- RR: Wangbangsan
- MR: Wangbangsan

Wangbangsan (Korean: 왕방산) is a mountain in Gyeonggi Province, South Korea. It lies between the cities of Pocheon and Dongducheon. It has an elevation of 737 m (2,418 ft).

== See also ==
- List of mountains in Korea
