= United States military and prostitution in South Korea =

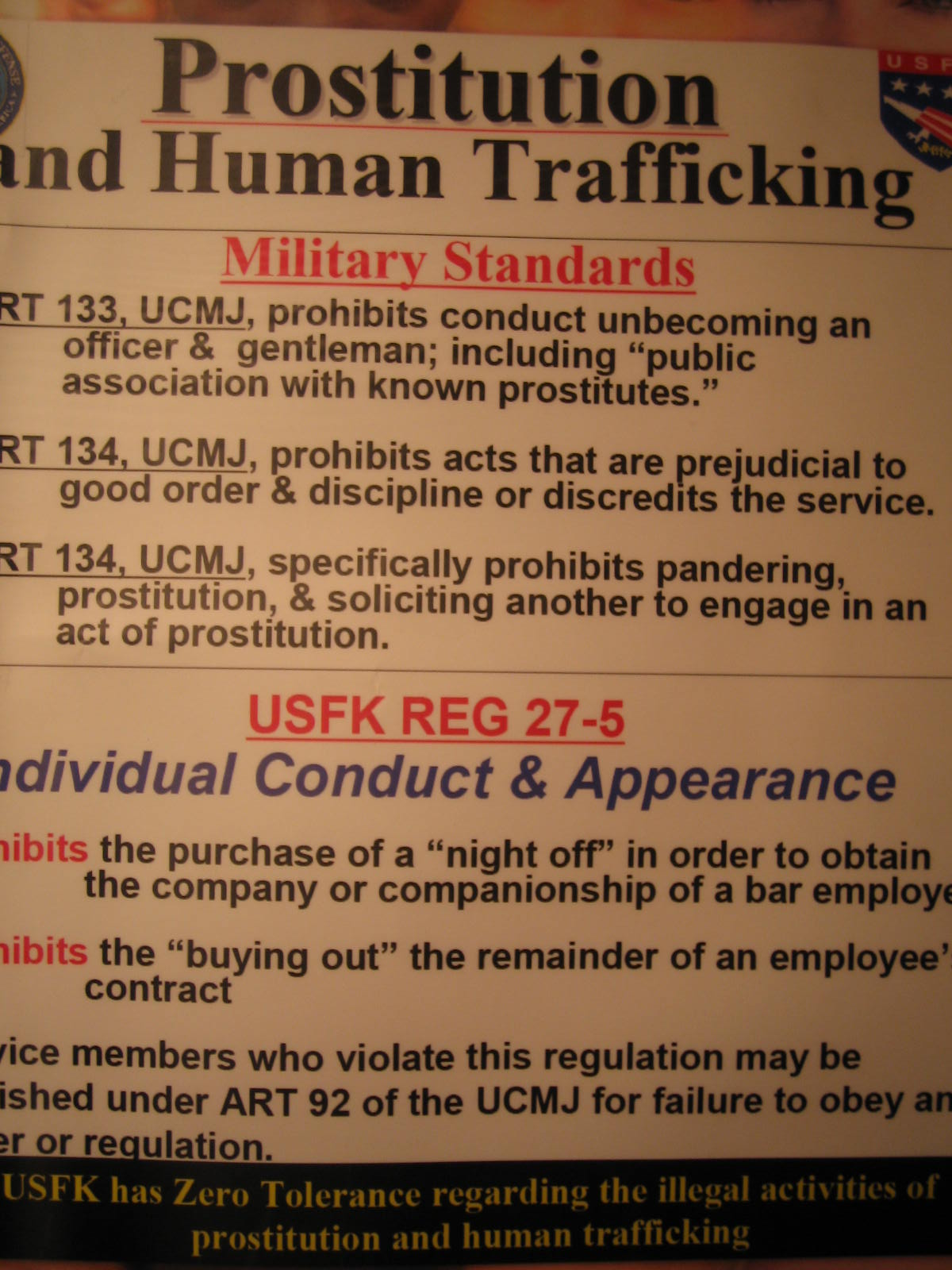
Uniform Code of Military Justice warning poster against prostitution and human trafficking posted by USFK

During and following the Korean war, the United States military used regulated prostitution services in South Korean military camptowns. Despite prostitution being illegal since 1948, women in South Korea were the fundamental source of sexual services for the U.S. military and a component of Korean-American relations. The women in South Korea who served as prostitutes are known as kijichon women were visited by the US military, and sometimes Korean soldiers or civilians. The prostitutes were formerly from Korea, but were largely replaced by women from the Philippines, China, Vietnam, Thailand, Sri Lanka, Indonesia, and the Commonwealth of Independent States (specifically Russia, Kazakhstan and Ukraine) since the 1990s.

== Etymology ==
Prostitutes servicing members of the U.S. military in South Korea have been known locally under a variety of terms. They were often referred to by euphemisms such as "bar girls", "special entertainers", or "business women".

Yankee princess (양공주; 洋公主; yanggongju) also translated as Western princess, were other common names and literal translations for the prostitutes in the Gijichon, U.S. military Camp Towns in South Korea. The term "Western princess" has been commonly used in the press, such as The Dong-a Ilbo for decades. It is also used as a derogatory term when referring to interracial couples, particular those between a white male and Korean female.

Yankee whore (양갈보; Yanggalbo) and Western whore are also common names. The women are also referred to as U.N. madams (유엔마담).

Until the early 1990s, the term "comfort women" (위안부; 慰安婦) was often used by South Korean media and officials to refer to prostitutes for the U.S. military, and the term "Yankee princess" has been used instead. However, by 2013, some South Korean media used the term "U.S. comfort women" (미군 위안부).

The early 1990s also saw the two women's rights movements diverge: on one side the one representing the Cheongsindae (comfort women for the Japanese military), and on the other side the movement representing the Gijichon (Camptown for the U.S. military). Despite many women on both sides being victims of forced labor, those who supported Cheongsidae believed the kijich'on women were willing participants in the system of prostitution and sexually promiscuous.

== History ==
Beginning in 1945, an institutionalized system of prostitution was adopted and permitted by the U.S. military and the Republic of Korea. Despite the United States Forces Korea's policy stating, "Hiring prostitutes is incompatible with our military core values", there is a discrepancy between "practice" and "policy". In Korean society, prostitution is viewed as a "necessary evil". The U.S. military have explained it as military culture that allows for American GIs to blow off steam and prevent homosexual tendencies. Prostitutes for U.S. soldiers were not only esteemed to be at the bottom of the social hierarchy by South Koreans, but also the lowest status within the hierarchy of prostitution.

=== U.S. military government rule in South Korea 1945-1948 ===
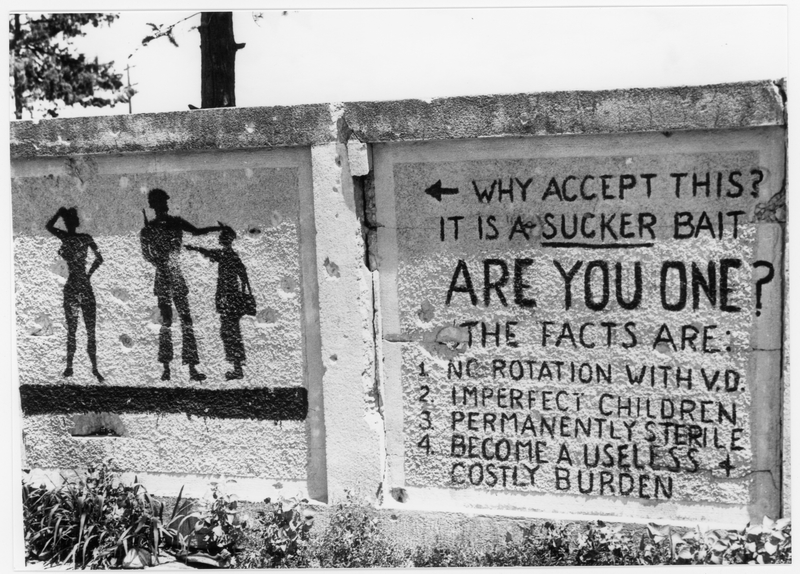
Sign during the Korean war warning of the risks of unprotected sex (1951)

In September 1945, United States Armed Forces, led by General John R. Hodge, occupied South Korea after Korea's liberation from Japan. This also included Imperial Japanese comfort stations. These events continued the government-sanctioned prostitution that was established in Korea under Japan's rule. The formation of licensed prostitution by Japan established registration protocols and mandatory STD examinations for Korean sex workers. Once the U.S. military occupied Korea, these examinations were conducted by the Bureau of Public Health and Welfare. In order to protect U.S. soldiers from contracting diseases from prostitutes, the service bars and clubs were relocated near and within military bases. By confining the prostitutes to within a small area, the U.S. military had the power to regulate and monitor the women's activities and health. As the U.S. military government tolerated and regulated prostitution, women's organizations argued for the abolishment of prostitution. In response, the United States passed The Abolishment of Public Prostitution Law in 1947. This abolished licensed prostitution; however, the law increased the proliferation of private prostitution.

=== Post Korean war ===
The aftermath of the Korean war resulted in extreme poverty and chaos, which produced a large influx in prostitutes as women resorted to sex work in order to support themselves and their family members. Prostitution became a regular and enduring feature of military camptowns.

Estimates for the number of Korean prostitutes below are variously based on figures from articles of independent writers, venereal disease examinations, and government statistics.

In 1953, the total number of prostitutes throughout the population in South Korea was 350,000 according to one government report. However, according to statistics from the Korean government, the total number of prostitutes in South Korea was 17,349 in 1953. According to the research by professor Lee Young-hoon, an economics professor at Seoul National University, into the number of examinations for venereal disease, he estimated that there were around 10,000 comfort women for the US military in the 1950's to 1960's. This is about one-third of the number of people engaged in the prostitution industry at a specific point in time between 1955 and 1966 ( 26,000 to 39,000 ). Surveys carried out during the 1950s and 1960s suggest that 60% of these prostitutes worked near U.S. military camps, but although these prostitutes worked near U.S. military camps, many of them served only Korean men. A 1984 report suggested that the number of prostitutes around U.S. bases had dropped to less than a third of the total number of prostitutes in the country.

An estimate from a writer claimed the number of prostitutes was probably proportional to the number of U.S. soldiers. The number of U.S. soldiers stationed in Korea stood at 326,863 in 1953; 225,590 in 1954; 75,328 in 1955; 55,864 in 1960; 45,000 in the 1970s and 42,000 in the 1980s. Many of the Korean prostitutes that worked in 1953 would leave within a year, while others continued to work for several more years. As the number of U.S. soldiers decreased after 1953, so did the number of Korean prostitutes.

In 1954, Korean government (보건사회복지부) figures give a total of 10,000–30,000 prostitutes servicing the UN/U.S. military in the South Korea, about 20,000 prostitutes in 1966, reducing to 13,000-14,000 in 1969, then reducing further to 9,935 in 1977.

The Second Republic viewed prostitution as something of a necessity. Starting in the 1960s, an official organized system was established to provide the U.S. military men with entertainment and leisure that fulfilled their sexual fantasies, such as peep shows and strip clubs. Lawmakers of the National Assembly urged the South Korean government to train a supply of prostitutes for allied soldiers to prevent them from spending their dollars in Japan. Lee Seung-u, the deputy home minister, gave a response to the National Assembly that the government had made some improvements in the "Supply of Prostitutes" for American soldiers. These camptowns existed as a site for the American GIs R&R.

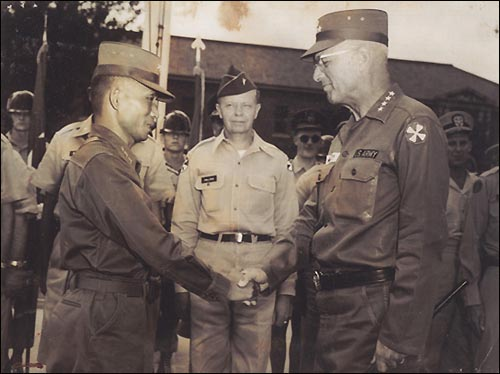
Park Chung-hee (left) shakes hands with General Guy S. Meloy after the May 16 coup. Park helped to enforce the "Base Community Clean-Up Campaign".

Park seized power in the May 16 coup, and immediately enforced two core laws. The first was the prostitution prevention law, which excluded "camp towns" from the governmental crackdown on prostitution; the second was the tourism promotion law, which designated camp towns as special tourism districts.

During the 1960s, prostitution and other related businesses generated nearly 25% of the South Korean GNP. In 1962, 20,000 comfort women were registered. The prostitutes attended classes sponsored by their government in English and etiquette to help them sell more effectively. They were praised as "dollar-earning patriots" or "true patriots" by the South Korean government. In the 1970s one junior high school teacher told his students that "The prostitutes who sell their bodies to the U.S. military are true patriots. Their dollars earned greatly contributes to our national economy. Don't talk behind their back that they are western princesses or U.N. madams."

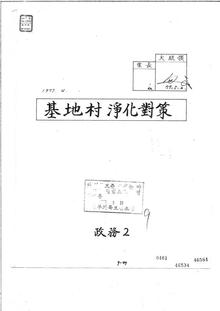
Base Community clean up policy, signed by President Park in 1977

In 1971, the number of American soldiers was reduced by 18,000 due to the Nixon Doctrine. Because of this, South Koreans were more afraid of the North Korean threat and its economic impact. Even so, camp town prostitution had already become an important component of South Korean livelihood. The advocacy group My Sister's Place wrote in 1991 that the American soldiers contributed one billion dollars to the South Korean economy. This was 1% of the South Korean GNP.

=== Racial segregation and discrimination against black soldiers ===
Camp town clubs were racially segregated between blacks and whites, and women were classified according to the soldiers' race. The residents near Camp Humphreys discriminated between black and white soldiers. Black soldiers vented their anger against camp town residents. On July 9, 1971, fifty black soldiers provoked a riot against racist discrimination and destroyed some clubs near Camp Humphreys. In turn, residents hunted down black soldiers with sickles. American military police and South Korean police quelled the rioters. Many Korean prostitutes demonstrated prejudiced behavior toward black soldiers by refusing to offer sexual services. Women who fraternized or sold sexual services to blacks were labeled as "black" by Americans and Koreans and faced severe social condemnation and stigmatization by others.

=== Camptown clean-up campaign ===
The significant increase in camptown problems and tensions among community relations resulted in a number of policies that sought to improve U.S. military camp areas. In August 1971, the Secretary of Home Affairs Ministry, in cooperation with health authorities, gave orders to each police station to take precautions against sexually transmitted diseases and to instruct prostitutes about them. On December 22, 1971, Park Chung-hee, the President of South Korea, enforced the Base Community Clean-Up Campaign. This also became known as the BCCUC. U.S. military personnel advised the South Korean government that the camp towns were breeding grounds for sexually transmitted infections and places of racist discrimination. The venereal disease ratio per 1,000 American soldiers rapidly increased. Through the collaboration of the United States and the Republic of Korea, these policies were implemented to prevent and correct unfavorable conditions and base-community relations. The United States' military and the BCCUC worked separately on solving issues that pertained to the camptown improvements.

The BCCUC's goal was to create a favorable image of U.S. servicemen in South Korea among Korean nationals. However; in order to do so, the BCCUC needed to fix a "source of embarrassment", the high rates of venereal disease among the American GIs and Korean sex workers. Registering prostitutes, enforcing STD examinations, and improving clinics were ways the BCCUC attempted to control prostitution and reduce the rates of sexually transmitted diseases. The U.S. military's goal was to improve the living conditions for U.S. servicemen and boost troop morale and discipline. By establishing the Subcommittee on Civil Military Relations, the U.S. military began to attend to these goals by focusing on eradicating sexually transmitted diseases and reducing racial discrimination. Other tasks included widening roads, improving sanitation, and making R&R establishments more accessible and inviting were some measures taken to improve the overall camptown environment.

It is argued that this campaign forced prostitutes to carry the weight of American-Korean relations. The U.S. Military Police Corps and South Korean officials regularly raided prostitutes who were thought to be spreading disease. They would detain those thought to be ill, locking them up under guard in so-called "monkey houses" that had barred windows. The three-story facility near Camp Casey, Korea was a medical jail for bar girls and prostitutes infected with sexually transmitted infection. (STD) The women were forced to take medications that were reported to make them vomit. Women who were certified to be without disease wore tags. The U.S. military issued and required the prostitutes who worked at clubs to carry venereal disease cards and also published a venereal disease guide to inform American soldiers patronizing bars.

=== Opposition movement ===
The women's movement against military prostitution began in the mid-1980s when Christian women and student movement activists came together to address the military prostitution issue. Ignited by the longstanding effort of Christian women organizations in the 1920s, it became a goal to eradicate prostitution. However, in the 1980s, the movement became focused on the relationship between women, democratization, and US military authoritarian rule. Two groups joined for this movement: Christian women organizations and student activists. My Sister's Place, also known as Durebang, was the first women's organization founded in 1986 to bring awareness to the kijich'on movement. Not only did they advocate for the abolishment of prostitution and against the exploitation of Korean women, My Sister's Place was also a center that provided educational and rehabilitation services for kijich'on women. The effort put into activism against kijich'on prostitution brought nationwide attention and became the subject for many feminist scholars.

Dongducheon, where many "juicy bars" and clubs are situated near military bases

During the early 1990s, the prostitutes became a symbol of South Korean anti-American nationalism. In 1992, one estimate claimed there were about 18,000 registered and 9,000 unregistered South Korean women around U.S. military bases. Korean government figures for 1992 were about 1,129 prostitutes working around U.S. military bases, and around 926 in 1993 and around 8,000 (mostly foreign women) in 1995.

In 1992, Yun Geum-i, a camptown sex worker in Dongducheon, was brutally killed by U.S. servicemen. Yun was found dead with a bottle stuffed into her vagina and an umbrella into her anus. In August 1993, the U.S. government compensated the victim's family with about US$72,000. However, the murder of a prostitute did not itself spark a national debate about the prerogatives of the U.S. forces; on the other hand, the rape of a twelve-year-old Okinawan school girl in 1995 by three American servicemen, one being a U.S. Navy Seaman, the others U.S. Marines, elicited much public outrage and brought wider attention to military-related violence against women.

=== Post-military government rule ===
Since 2004, the majority of prostitutes have been Philippine or Russian women. South Korean sex workers have become less numerous as Filipino and Russian women were a cheaper labor alternative. Since the mid-1990s, foreigners make up 80–85% of the women working at clubs near military bases. With the collapse of the Soviet Union, thousands of Russian women migrated to Korea to work as entertainers while others were forced into prostitution for both American soldiers and Korean civilian men.

Despite Filipino and Russian sex workers being the majority, Korean prostitutes are still present in large numbers. According to the Ministry of Gender Equality and Family, South Korean prostitutes numbered about 330,000 in 2002. Most of these are not working near US bases, but operating in the local economy.

In August 1999, a Korean club owner in Dongducheon was accused of trafficking in women by bringing more than 1000 Philippine and Russian women into South Korea for U.S. military bases, but a South Korean judge overturned the warrant. In 2000, five foreign women locked in a brothel died in a fire in Gunsan.

In 2002, Fox Television reported casing brothels where trafficked women were allegedly forced to prostitute themselves to American soldiers. U.S. soldiers testified that the club or bar owners buy the women at auctions, therefore the women must earn large sums of money to recover their passports and freedom. In May 2002, U.S. lawmakers asked U.S. Secretary of Defense Donald Rumsfeld for an investigation that "If U.S. soldiers are patrolling or frequenting these establishments, the military is in effect helping to line the pockets of human traffickers".

In June 2002, the U.S. Department of Defense pledged to investigate the trafficking allegations. In 2003, the Seoul District Court ruled that three night club owners near Camp Casey must compensate all Filipina women who had been forced into prostitution. The club owners had taken their passports and had kept the women locked up. One Philippine woman who was in captivity kept a diary about her confinement, beating, abortion and starvation. Before the trial began, the International Organization for Migration studied the trafficking of foreign women and reported the result to its headquarters in Geneva. The Philippine Embassy also joined the proceedings, making it the first embassy to take steps on behalf of its nationals.

In 2002, the South Korean government completely discontinued issuing visas to Russian women, so prostitution businesses moved to bring in more Filipinas instead. Human traffickers also brought in many Russian women through marriages and sham marriages with Korean men so they could stay legally in South Korea. In 2005, Filipina and Russian women became common in Korean red light districts and even accounted for 90 percent of the prostitutes in U.S. military camp towns. In 2005, Hwang Sook-hyang, a club owner in Dongducheon, was sentenced to a 10-month suspended sentence and 160 hours of community service on charges of illegal brothel-keeping. The following civil trial sentenced him to compensate US$5,000 to a Philippine woman who was forced to have sex with U.S. soldiers between February 8 and March 3, 2004. The Philippine woman was recruited by a South Korean company in the Philippines as a nightclub singer in 2004, then she and several Philippine women were locked inside Hwang's club and forced to have sex with U.S. soldiers. The former "juicy bar" employees testified that soldiers usually paid US$150 to bring women from the bar to a hotel room for sex; the women received US$40. Most juicy bars have a quota system linked to drink purchases. Women who do not sell enough juice are forced into prostitution by their managers.

In 2004, the U.S. Defense Department proposed anti-prostitution policies. A U.S. serviceman at Camp Foster (located on Okinawa) told a Stars and Stripes reporter that although prostitution was illegal in the United States, South Korea, Thailand and Australia, it was "pretty open". By 2009, the Philippine Embassy in South Korea had established a "Watch List" of bars where Philippine women were forced into prostitution and were considering sharing it with the U.S. military in hopes that U.S. commanders would put such establishments near bases off-limits to their troops.

As of 2009, some 3,000 to 4,000 women working as prostitutes came annually from Southeast Asia, accounting for 90% of the prostitutes. Despite prostitution being illegal in South Korea, camp towns were still practically exempted from crackdowns.

In 2011, the Eighth Army founded the Prevention of Sexual Assault Task Force; the task force assessed and reported the climate in South Korea regarding sexual assault among U.S. soldiers.

In 2012, a United States Forces Korea public service announcement clarified, "Right now, young women are being lured to Korea thinking they will become singers and dancers," and "Instead, they will be sexually exploited in order to support their families." The United States Forces Korea posted a video on YouTube, clarifying that "buying overpriced drinks in a juicy bar supports the human trafficking industry, a form of modern-day slavery." However, some U.S. commanders continue to allow American soldiers to patronize the bars as long as they have not been caught directly engaging in prostitution or human trafficking. Most recently, in June 2013, General Jan-Marc Jouas placed all juicy bars outside Osan Air Base off-limits for Seventh Air Force personnel. This change in policy resulted in three weeks of large scale protests in the local area; however, General Jouas credits this change in policy as resulting in most juicy bars in the area closing down.

In 2013, the Government of the Philippines stopped approving contracts that promoters used to bring Philippine women to South Korea to work near U.S. military bases.

On June 25, 2014, 122 surviving Korean comfort women for the U.S. forces filed a lawsuit against their government to reclaim human dignity and demand ₩10 million compensation per plaintiff. According to the claim, they were supervised by the U.S. forces and the South Korean government and South Korean authorities colluded with pimps in blocking them from leaving. In 2017, a three judge panel of the Central District Court in Seoul ordered the government to pay 57 plaintiffs the equivalent of $4,240 each in compensation for physical and psychological damage.

Since 2014, USFK has banned all American military service members from visiting any establishments that allow patrons to buy drinks (or juice) for the hostesses for the purposes of their companionship. Hostess bars, juicy bars and anywhere that the company of women can be purchased are off-limits to the American military. Since US military service members were a large source of the hostess bars' clientele, this effectively closed all hostessing themed establishments nearby to all US military bases in Korea.

=== Decline and aftermath ===
Due to the revised prostitution-related laws that the South Korean government began to strictly enforce starting in the 2000s, the prostitution industry began to decline rapidly throughout the nation. Although some mediators attempted to sustain the industry through the trafficking of foreign women, most military "camp towns" were rapidly shut down in the early 21st century.

Conflict of opinion between local authorities and civic groups continues over the demolition of the Dongducheon venereal disease control center, known as the last vestige of the former kijichon. While city authorities are proceeding with a development project on the site, civic groups have argued that it should be developed into a public facility to preserve the history of the kijichon victims.

== Policies ==
Foreign policies between the United States and Republic of Korea determined the U.S.'s occupation and influence in South Korea. Through collaboration between Korean leaders and the U.S. military, an institutionalized system transpired which tolerated and regulated prostitution. The arrival of American GIs resulted in greater demand for Korean sex workers and an increase in clientele for R&R (Rest and Relaxation) establishments.

Through the Mutual Defense Treaty, the Republic of Korea formally granted military facilities, areas, and status for U.S. troops in Korea for an indefinite period. The presence of U.S. military troops, under the Mutual Defense Treaty, were the product of high kijich'on prostitution rates.

The Abolishment of Public Prostitution Law (Public Act No. 7) was passed on November 11, 1947, and took effect on February 14, 1948. The U.S. policy was installed in order to alter the system of licensed prostitution which was established in Korea under Japan's rule. Despite the abolishment of licensed prostitution, it only led to the “privatization” of prostitution and the widespread dispersement of prostitutes throughout the area. This made it difficult for the government to systematically regulate prostitutes and their activities; specifically, mandatory STD exams for prostitutes could no longer be enforced. This resulted in a large spike of STD's among prostitutes and the U.S. military. Rehabilitation and welfare assistance for prostitutes were supposed to be a part of the new law; however, policymakers denied national funds towards these programs.

Through the Abolishment of Public Prostitution Law, the U.S. military government replaced licensed establishments of prostitution to camptowns near military bases. This provided a communal space for prostitutes and U.S. military men.

== Kijich'on (camp towns) ==
The large army Kijich'on (lit. camp towns) were mainly located near the demilitarized zone (DMZ) which is between North and South Korea. The most popular camptowns were Pyeongtaek, Paju, Dongducheon, and Uijeongbu which have developed near main U.S. army bases. Kijich’on towns were neighbored to U.S. military camp bases and contain a combination of American and Korean residents. These towns consisted of businesses and entertainment that served the interests of U.S. military men. In brothels, bars, and clubs, these R&R establishments provided kijich'on women for American GIs. Camptowns also contained other businesses such as barbershops, pawnshops, convenience stores, and so forth. The camp towns relied solely on the traffic of customers that is brought by the kijich'on nightlife.

From the 1950s to the 1970s, the Kyŏnggi Province housed the majority of U.S. army troops and Korean sex workers. In 1977, 18,551 of the estimated 36,924 Korean sex workers were located in the Kyŏnggi Province. In 2001, 21 out of 34 remaining U.S. military bases are located in the Kyŏnggi Province. Within the Kyŏnggi Province, Tongduch’ŏn, P’yŏngt’aek, P’aju, and Ŭijŏngbu are the most concentrated cities for prostitution.

In 1969, the Nixon Doctrine declared the need to reduce the United States' military involvement from Asia. This resulted in 20,000 U.S. servicemen being removed from South Korea and the formal withdrawal of American GIs from the DMZ. Due to the economic dependence on the U.S. military's presence for jobs and income, prostitution decreased but competition significantly heightened among clubs, other businesses, and sex workers. Newspapers reported the significant economic losses and the widespread dislocation that occurred after the removal of U.S. troops. It was publicized that some establishments went from making $200 to $300 per night to a profit of $4 to $5. Many who lived near U.S. bases needed to relocate to more concentrated areas while others found work in different industries. The removal of U.S. troops under the Nixon Doctrine caused an increase in camptown problems and great resentment towards the United States.

== Women and offspring ==
The children born to American soldiers and South Korean prostitutes were often abandoned when soldiers returned to the U.S. By the 1970s, tens of thousands of children had been born to South Korean women and American soldiers. In South Korea, these children are often the target of racist vitriol and abuse, being called mostly "western princess bastards" (Yanggongju-ssaekki) children of white soldiers, and a minority born to black soldiers were "darkies" (Kkamdungi). It was difficult for South Korean prostitutes around the U.S. military bases to escape from being stigmatized by their society, so their only hope was to move to the United States and marry an American soldier. Trafficked Filipinas also had the same expectation.

Some American soldiers paid off the women's debt to their owners to free them in order to marry them. However, most U.S. soldiers were unaware of the trafficking. Some soldiers helped Philippine women escape from clubs. In 2009, juicy bar owners near Camp Casey who had political muscle demanded that U.S. military officials do something to prevent G.I.s from wooing away their bar girls with promises of marriage. In June 2010, U.S. forces started a program to search for soldiers who had left and abandoned a wife or children. Haunting the Korean Diaspora: Shame, Secrecy, and the Forgotten War, a research on prostitutes by Grace M. Cho, daughter of a G.I. and a South Korean woman, was awarded the best 2010 book on Asia and Asian America by the American Sociological Association.

A former South Korean prostitute said to The New York Times that they have been the biggest sacrifice of the Mutual Defense Treaty Between the United States and the Republic of Korea. The women also see themselves as war victims. They are seeking compensation and apologies. Because of this tainted history, the primary stereotype that most South Koreans held of South Korean women who had copulated with white men or "crackers" ("Hindungi") was mainly negative. Besides, the first transnational marriages were mostly between U.S. soldiers and Korean women who worked in U.S. military bases or who were camp prostitutes. The U.S. government has no official statistic on the number of Korean women married to U.S. soldiers. Others come from unconfirmed statistics from writers. The author Grace M. Cho came up with her own estimate, claiming that by 2010, 100,000 Korean women had married U.S. soldiers and moved to the United States. South Korean women married to foreigners are often viewed as prostitutes. Marriages between South Koreans and foreigners often carry a serious stigma in South Korean society. A woman who is married to a Spaniard said that almost 100% of middle-aged South Korean men look her up and down when she walks hand in hand with her husband.

Internationally married women in the United States often faced prejudice once they arrived in America. Many people assumed the women were camp-town workers or sex workers.

== In popular culture and contemporary art ==
=== Socially engaged art ===
- Ppeppeorl: The Montage of Time and Space by Dalo Hyunjoo Kim and Cho Gwang Hee, (2022)
- Strange meetings by Jane Jin Kaisen, (2017)
- Gijichon: Collecting Fragment by Alex Heeyeon Kil
- Narrow Sorrow by siren eun young jung, (2007)

=== Films ===
- The Women Outside: Korean Women and the U.S. Military (1995) is a documentary produced by Hye Jung Park and J.T. Takagi.
- Comfort Woman - Wianbu (2008) is a short film directed and produced by James Bang. It was nominated for the 35th Student Academy Awards.
- The Evil Night (1952) and A Flower in Hell (1958) by Shin Sang-ok depict South Korean prostitutes within the films.
- Silver Stallion (1991) by Chang Kil-su shows a prostitute symbolizing the raped nation of Korea.
- Camp Arirang (1995)
- Spring in My Hometown (1998) by Lee Kwang-mo depicts a prostitute waiting for her American lover who never returns.
- Address Unknown (2001) by Kim Ki-duk depicts the lover of a prostitute who never returns to South Korea.
- Bloodless (2017) by Gina Kim is based on the true story of a South Korean prostitute, Yun Keum Yi, brutally murdered by a US soldier in 1992.

=== Theater ===
- Seven Neighborhoods Like Warm Sisters depicts prostitutes living near Camp Humphreys.
- Though it is not set in South Korea, the theme of Miss Saigon (1989) is based upon the romantic encounter between an American serviceman and a Vietnamese prostitute during the Vietnam War.

=== Novels ===
- Memories of My Ghost Brother by Heinz Insu Fenkl (1996)
- Shorty Kim (1957).
- A Stray Bullet by Yu Hyun-mok depicts one woman who becomes a prostitute to rescue her family.
- What Crashes, Has Wings (1988).

== See also ==
- Sexual slavery
- Bordel militaire de campagne
- Wartime sexual violence
- Lai Đại Hàn
- Prostitution in South Korea

== Bibliography ==
- Argibay, Carmen (2003). "Sexual Slavery and the Comfort Women of World War II". Berkeley Journal of International Law. 21 (2). Archived from the original on 2019-12-30.
- Cheng, Sealing (2010). On the Move for Love: Migrant Entertainers and the U.S. Military in South Korea. University of Pennsylvania Press. ISBN 978-0-8122-4217-1.
- Cho, Grace M. (2007). "Voices from the Teum: Synesthetic Trauma and the Ghosts of the Korean Diaspora". In Clough, Patricia Ticineto; Halley, Jean (eds.). The Affective Turn: Theorizing the Social. Duke University Press. ISBN 978-0-8223-8960-6.
- Cho, Grace M. (2008). Haunting the Korean Diaspora: Shame, Secrecy, and the Forgotten War. University of Minnesota Press. ISBN 978-0-8166-5275-4.
- Cho, Grace M. (2021). Tastes of War: A Korean American daughter's exploration of food and family history, in order to understand her mother's schizophrenia. The Feminist Press. ISBN 978-1952177941.
- Doolan, Yuri W. (2024). The First Amerasians: Mixed Race Koreans from Camptowns to America. Oxford University Press. ISBN 978-0197534397.
- Chow, Esther Ngan-Ling; Segal, Marcia Texler; Lin, Tan (2011). Analyzing Gender, Intersectionality, and Multiple Inequalities: Global-transnational and Local Contexts. Emerald Group Publishing. ISBN 9780857247445.
- Dank, Barry Michael; Refinetti, Roberto, eds. (2000). The Politics of Sexuality. Transaction Publishers. p. 169. ISBN 9781412831420. "camptown clean up campaign."
- Finckenauer, James O. (2007). "The Problem of Human Trafficking". Mafia and Organized Crime. True Crime. London: Oneworld Publications. ISBN 978-1-85168-526-4.
- Shin, Gi-Wook (2006). Rethinking Historical Injustice and Reconciliation in Northeast Asia: The Korean Experience. Routledge. ISBN 978-0-415-47451-1.
- Höhn, Maria (2010). Over There: Living with the U.S. Military Empire from World War Two to the Present. Duke University Press. ISBN 978-0-8223-4827-6.
- Hughes, Donna M. (2010). International Sex Trafficking of Women & Children: Understanding the Global Epidemic. Looseleaf Law Publications. ISBN 978-1-932777-86-4.
- Hughes, Donna M.; Chon, Katherine Y.; Ellerman, Derek P. (30 June 2016). "Modern-day comfort women: the U.S. Military, transnational crime, and the trafficking of women". Violence Against Women. 13 (9): 901–922. doi:10.1177/1077801207305218. PMID 17704050. S2CID 46122372.
- Kim, Elaine (1997). Dangerous Women: Gender and Korean Nationalism. Routledge. ISBN 978-0-415-91506-9.
- Kim, Hosu (2016). Birth Mothers and Transnational Adoption Practice in South Korea: Virtual Mothering. Springer. ISBN 978-1-137-53852-9.
- Kuo, Lenore (2005). Prostitution Policy: Revolutionizing Practice through a Gendered Perspective. New York University Press. ISBN 978-0-8147-4791-9.
- Lee, Na Young (2007). "The construction of military prostitution in South Korea during the U.S. military rule, 1945-1948". Feminist Studies. 33 (3). OCLC 938373395.
- Lee, Jin-kyung (2010). Service Economies: Militarism, Sex Work, and Migrant Labor in South Korea. University of Minnesota Press. ISBN 978-0-8166-5126-9.
- Lee, Na-Young (January 2011). "Negotiating the Boundaries of Nation, Christianity, and Gender: the Korean Women's Movement against Military Prostitution". Asian Journal of Women's Studies. 17 (1): 34–66. doi:10.1080/12259276.2011.11666102. ISSN 1225-9276. S2CID 147694759.
- Lie, John (1995). "The Transformation of Sexual Work in 20th-Century Korea". Gender and Society. 9 (3): 310–327. doi:10.1177/089124395009003004. ISSN 0891-2432. JSTOR 190058. S2CID 145096997.
- McHugh, Kathleen (2005). South Korean Golden Age Melodrama: Gender, Genre, And National Cinema. Wayne State University Press. ISBN 978-0-8143-3253-5.
- Moon, Katharine H.S (1997). Sex Among Allies. New York: Columbia University Press. ISBN 978-0-231-10643-6. OCLC 36589954.
- Moon, Katharine H. S. (2006). Sex among allies: military prostitution in U.S.-Korea relations. W. Ross MacDonald School, Resource Services Library. OCLC 1011710706.
- Moon, Katharine (2009-01-12). "Military Prostitution and the U.S. Military in Asia". The Asia-Pacific Journal: Japan Focus. 7 (3).
- Okubo, Shiro; Shelley, Louise (2011). Human Security, Transnational Crime and Human Trafficking: Asian and Western Perspectives. Routledge. ISBN 978-1-136-83294-9.
- Renzaho, Andre M. N., ed. (2016). Globalisation, Migration And Health: Challenges And Opportunities. World Scientific. ISBN 9781783268900.
- Soh, C. Sarah (2008). The Comfort Women: Sexual Violence and Postcolonial Memory in Korea and Japan. University of Chicago Press. ISBN 9780226767772.
- Woo, Susie (2019). Framed by War: Korean Children and Women at the Crossroads of US Empire. NYU Press. ISBN 978-1-4798-8991-4.
