= 296th Brigade Support Battalion =

296th Brigade Support Battalion (296th BSB)
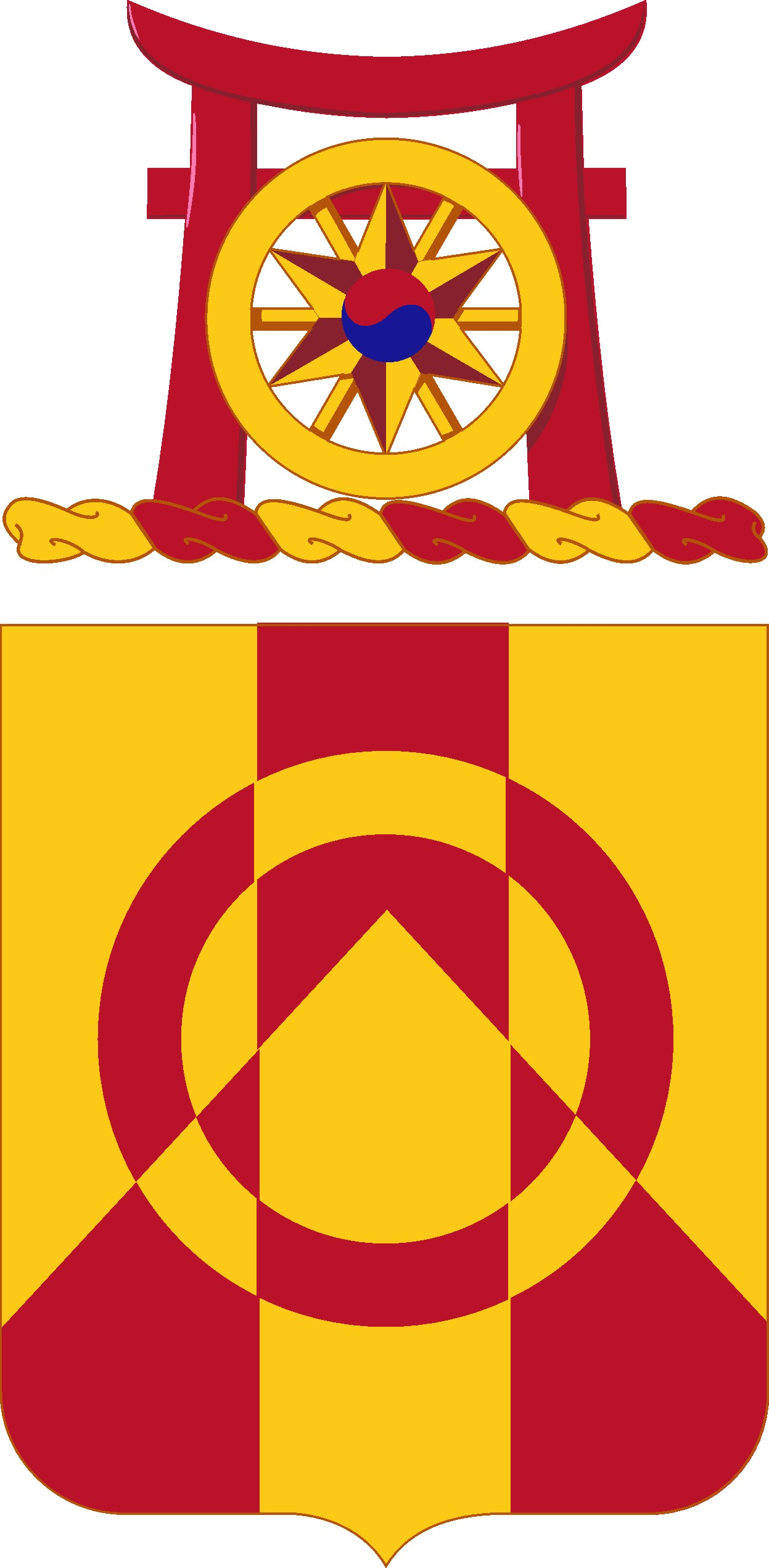
- Coat of Arms
- Active: 23 Nov 1944 – 5 Nov 1955; 16 Oct 1989 – 16 Sep 1992; 15 Sep 2000 – present
- Country: United States
- Branch: United States Army
- Type: Logistics
- Role: Combat Service Support
- Garrison/HQ: Joint Base Lewis-McChord, Washington
- Motto: "Frontline Support"
- Colors: Gold/buff and red
- Engagements: Korean War
- Battle honours: Army Meritorious Unit Commendation (2) Army Superior Unit Award (2); Army Valorous Unit Award (2) Republic of Korea Presidential Unit Citation (2)

Insignia
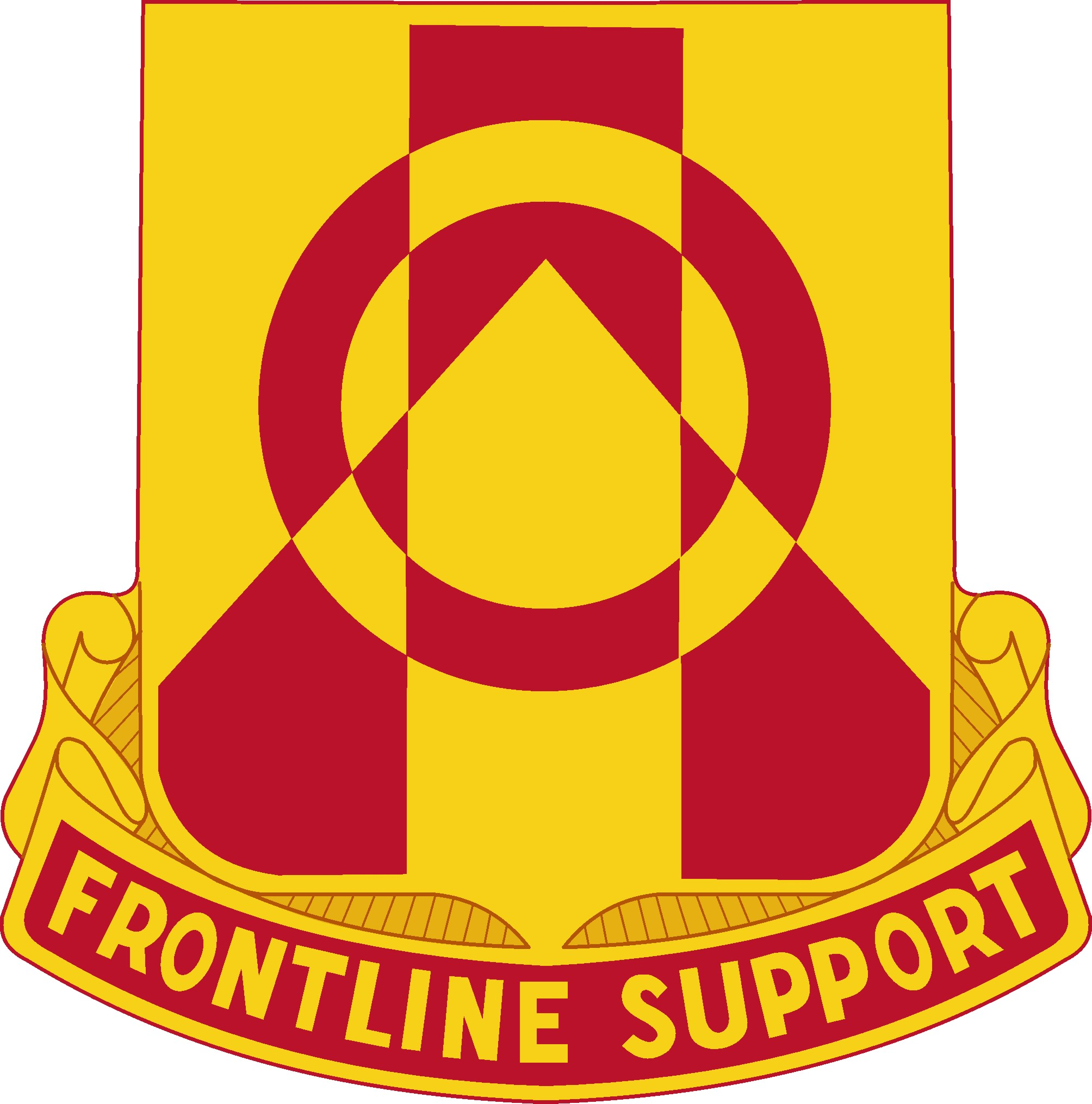
- Distinctive Unit Insignia

The 296th Brigade Support Battalion (296th BSB) is a battalion of the United States Army composed of four companies that support the operations of the 1/2 ID SBCT. The companies are Headquarters and Headquarters Company (HHC), Alpha Company (A Company), Bravo Company (B Company), and Charlie Company (C Company).

The battalion supports the "Ghost Brigade" 1st Brigade, 2nd Infantry Division (1st Brigade Combat Team 2nd Infantry Division), the Army's first Stryker Brigade Combat Team stationed at Fort Lewis, Washington. The 296th Brigade Support Battalion (296th BSB) deploys by land, air, and or sea anywhere in the world to provide the 1-2 Stryker Brigade Combat Team with health care and logistics support, including transportation, field-feeding, supply, and maintenance.

== History ==
The 296th Forward Support Battalion was constituted on 23 November 1944 in the Army of the United States as the Headquarters and Headquarters Detachment, 296th Quartermaster Battalion, Mobile, and activated on 15 December 1944 at Camp Bowie, Texas. On 1 August 1946, following World War II, the Battalion was converted and redesignated as Headquarters and Headquarters Detachment, 296th Transportation Corps Truck Battalion. The unit was once again reorganized and redesignated on 17 October 1949, this time as Headquarters and Headquarters Company, 296th Truck Battalion.

On 25 October 1951, the unit was allocated to the Regular Army and on 8 April 1954, reorganized and redesignated as Headquarters and Headquarter Company, 296th Transportation Battalion. Inactivated 5 November 1955 in Korea, the unit was reactivated and redesignated 16 October 1989 as Headquarters and Headquarters Company, 296th Support Battalion, assigned to the 2nd Infantry Division in Korea. While stationed at Camp Edwards, Korea in direct support of 3rd Brigade, 2nd Infantry Division, The soldiers of the battalion Provided support to the units keeping watch on the Korean demilitarized zone. It was there that the Battalion earned its nickname "Frontline Support." Three years later, on 16 September 1992, the battalion was inactivated.

The 296th Forward Support Battalion was subsequently reactivated on 16 October 1995 at Fort Lewis, Washington, and on 15 September 2000 renamed the 296th Brigade Support Battalion (BSB) as part of the interim Brigade Combat Team.

On 7 February 2004, 296th BSB completed a transfer of authority from 101st Airborne Division in Mosul, Iraq, in support of combat operations in Samarrah, Mosul, Tal Afar, Al Kut and Taji. There the battalion supported the first combat deployment of the Army’s first Stryker Brigade. The soldiers of the battalion provided support to the Arrowhead Brigade conducting operations from the Iraq-Syria Border to the southern Iraq town of Al Kut. On 4 November 2005, the battalion returned to Fort Lewis to prepare for future operations.

On 30 July 2006, the 296th BSB completed a transfer of authority from the 172nd BSB, 172nd Stryker Brigade Combat Team in Mosul Iraq, where they conducted force sustainment operations from Mosul to Tal Afar and Taji. During December 2006, the 296th BSB moved south to conduct operations in the Multinational Division-Baghdad Area of Operations where it continued operations to numerous other cities as well as Baqubah. In September 2007 the 296th Brigade Support Battalion returned to Fort Lewis.

On 2 September 2009, the 296th BSB completed a transfer of authority from the 25th BSB, 1st-25th Stryker Brigade Combat Team in Baqubah, Iraq, where they were task organized to include engineer, intelligence, signal and cavalry units. Task Force Frontline performed admirably in the conduct of numerous force sustainment and operational support missions enabling Arrowhead Brigade operations throughout Diyala Governorate. In July 2010 the Frontline Battalion returned to JBLM.

On 6 April 2012, the 296th BSB completed a transfer of authority from the 25th BSB, 1st-25th Stryker Brigade Combat Team at Kandahar Airfield, Afghanistan. 296 BSB assumed responsibility for providing aggressive and disciplined sustainment support to Combined Task Force Arrowhead which was composed of more than 6,000 Soldiers from six U.S. battalions and two NATO Coalition-partnered Romanian Army Battalions spread across 22,680 square miles at 26 different locations. The Frontline Battalion projected sustainment support throughout the Combined Task Force Arrowhead area of operations in Regional Command South through convoys and task organization of Soldiers in Forward Logistics Elements to provide direct support to the maneuver battalions. In December 2012 the Frontline Battalion returned to JBLM, WA.

== Campaign participation credit ==
- Korean War
  - CCF Spring Offensive
  - U\UN Summer–Fall Offensive 1952
  - Second Korean Winter
  - Korea, Summer–Fall 1952
  - Third Korean Winter
  - Korea, Summer 1953
- War On Terrorism
  - Operation Iraqi Freedom
  - Operation Enduring Freedom

== Decorations ==
- Army Valorous Unit Award, 20 January 2007 to 29 January 2007
- Army Valorous Unit Award, 5 April 2007 – 22 April 2007
- Meritorious Unit Commendation (Army), Streamer embroidered KOREA 1953-1954
- Meritorious Unit Commendation (Army), Streamer embroidered IRAQ 2003-2004
- Meritorious Unit Commendation (Army), 7 August 2009 – 24 July 2010
- Army Superior Unit Award, Streamer embroidered 1999-2000
- Army Superior Unit Award, Streamer embroidered 2002-2003
- Republic of Korea Presidential Unit Citation, Streamer embroidered KOREA 1951-1952
- Republic of Korea Presidential Unit Citation, Streamer embroidered KOREA 1952-1953

== Coat of arms ==
The coat of arms was authorized for the 296th Support Battalion on 23 January 1990 by the Institute of Heraldry, United States Army. An amendment, dated 6 February 1990, changed slightly the description for the blazon of the crest. Note that a crest is authorized for units which are Active Army and have war/campaign service. The amended portion is seen below in bold lettering. The blazon and symbolism of the design are as follows:

=== Shield ===
Gold/buff and red are the colors traditionally associated with U.S. Army Support Organizations. The chevron alludes to the motto, “Frontline Support”, symbolizing the thrust to support the frontline in combat. The annulet denotes speed and quick response in supplying aid and support, and refers to the accomplishments of the predecessor unit. The pale is representative of strength and resolution.

=== Crest ===
The hongsalmun gate recalls the unit’s Korean War service, symbolized also by the taeguk embossed on the compass rose. The battalion’s post-World War II Services as the 296th Transportation Truck Battalion is represented by the gold wheel. The compass rose denotes worldwide service. Red stands for courage, gold for excellence. A distinctive unit insignia was authorized for the 296th Support Battalion on 23 January 1990 by the Institute of Heraldry, United States Army. The description and symbolism of the design are as follows:

==== Description ====
A gold color metal and enamel device 1 1/8 inches (2.9 cm) in height overall, consisting of a shield blazoned: Per chevron or and gules, a pale interlaced with an annulet counterchanged. Attached below the shield a red scroll doubled and inscribed “FRONTLINE SUPPORT” in gold.

==== Symbolism ====
Gold/buff and red are the colors traditionally associated with U.S. Army Support organizations. The chevron alludes to the motto, “Frontline Support”, symbolizing the thrust to support the front line in combat. The annulet denotes speed and quick response in supplying aid and support and refers to the accomplishments of the predecessor unit. The pale is representative of strength and resolution.

== Company functions ==
- Headquarters and Headquarters Company (HHC) (Outlaws) is the Headquarters and Headquarters Company (HHC) and Command Group including Field Feeding Teams
- A Company (Alpha Company) (Avengers) is the Distribution and Supply Company
- B Company (Bravo Company) (Black Knights) is the Field Maintenance Company including Combat Repair Teams
- C Company (Charlie Company) (Valkyrie) is the Brigade Support Medical Company

== Battalion Commanders ==
- Lieutenant Colonel Thomas J. Richardson 1996-1998
- Lieutenant Colonel Phillip Owens 1998-2000
- Lieutenant Colonel Cindy-Lee M. Knapp 2000-2002
- Lieutenant Colonel Dennis M. Thompson 2002-2004
- Lieutenant Colonel Nancy J. Grandy 2006-2008
- Lieutenant Colonel Dwayne M. Butler 2008-2009
- Lieutenant Colonel Harry H. Hungerford 2009-2011
- Lieutenant Colonel Michael B. Siegl 2011-2013
- Lieutenant Colonel Christopher D. Corizzo 2013–2015
- Lieutenant Colonel Justin M. Zimmer 2015–2017
- Lieutenant Colonel Stephen M. Crow 2017-2019
- Lieutenant Colonel Stephen A. Polacek 2019-2021
- Lieutenant Colonel Harry Mars IV 2021-2023
- Lieutenant Colonel Zachary R. Bock 2023-Present

== Command Sergeants-Major ==
- Command Sergeant Major Napoleon A. Erolin 2002-2003
- Command Sergeant Major Jose DLG Crisostomo 2006-2008
- Command Sergeant Major Julie A. Walter 2008-2009
- Command Sergeant Major Steven B.Winters 2009-2010
- Command Sergeant Major Joanne M.Cox 2011-2012
- Command Sergeant Major Francisco Cervantes Jr. 2012-2013
- Command Sergeant Major Chukwuemeka N. Uchegbu 2013–2015
- Command Sergeant Major Kevin R. Moreland 2015–2018
- Command Sergeant Major Jeffrey Campbell 2018-2020
- Command Sergeant Major Eric D. Richardson 2020-2022
- Command Sergeant Major Carla R. Stancil 2022-2024
- Command Sergeant Major Christina E. Szabo-Smith 2024-Present

== See also ==
- Chaplain Major H. Timothy Vakoc (first U.S. military chaplain to die from wounds received in the Iraq War and member of the 296th)
