= Wianbu =

Wianbu is the romanization of the Korean term 위안부 which in turn is the Korean reading of the Japanese term 慰安婦.
Wianbu may refer to:

- Ilbongun wianbu (일본군 위안부, lit. Comfort women for the Japanese army), girls and women who were forced into sexual slavery by the Imperial Japanese Army during World War II.
- Yankee princess, Prostitutes in South Korea for the U.S. military after World War II.
