= Tim Vakoc =

United States Army chaplain (1960–2009)

The Reverend Tim Vakoc
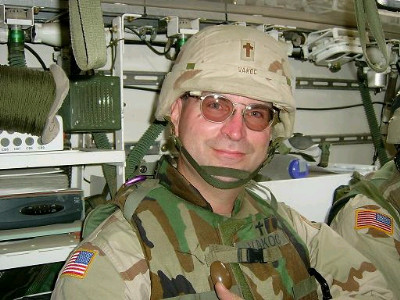
- Born: Henry Timothy Vakoc; January 8, 1960; Robbinsdale, Minnesota
- Died: June 20, 2009 (aged 49); New Hope, Minnesota
- Burial place: Fort Snelling National Cemetery; Minneapolis, MN; 44°52′15″N 93°13′11″W
- Military career
- Allegiance: United States
- Branch: United States Army
- Service years: 1996–2004
- Rank: Major (Chaplain)
- Nickname: Father Tim
- Units: 44th Corps Support Battalion, Task Force Olympia
- Conflicts: Operation Iraqi Freedom
- Awards: Bronze Star; Purple Heart; Combat Action Badge

Henry Timothy Vakoc ("VAH-kitch"; January 8, 1960 – June 20, 2009) was an American Catholic priest and Army chaplain during the Iraq War, attaining the rank of major. He was critically injured on May 29, 2004, when his Humvee was struck by an IED as he was returning from celebrating Mass for soldiers. As of 2009 he was believed to be the only Army chaplain seriously injured during the war.

== Early years ==
Vakoc was born on January 8, 1960, in Robbinsdale, Minnesota. He graduated in 1978 from Benilde-St. Margaret's School, Minneapolis. He graduated from St. Cloud State University, St. Cloud, Minnesota and was a member of Tau Kappa Epsilon fraternity. He was also a member of the fraternity staff, visiting chapters in the midwestern and northeastern United States.

== Seminary and priesthood ==
He attended Saint Paul Seminary School of Divinity, at the University of St. Thomas, St. Paul, Minnesota. On May 30, 1992, he was ordained a Roman Catholic priest, for the Archdiocese of Saint Paul and Minneapolis.

Vakoc's first assignment was as associate pastor at St. Charles Borromeo Church, in St. Anthony, Minn. (1992–1993). He later served as associate pastor of St. John Neumann Church, in Eagan, Minn. (1993–1996). He left that post to join the Army.

== Military service ==
Vakoc became an Army chaplain in 1996, receiving his commission as a lieutenant in the Army chaplain corps. His first assignment was Garrison Catholic Priest in Heidelberg, Germany. He then was reassigned to Hanau, Germany, During that time he deployed to Bosnia. He was assigned to Fort Carson, Colo., where he served for three and a half years. He was then assigned as chaplain for the 44th Corps Support Battalion from Fort Lewis, Wash. The 44th provided logistical support to the Fort Lewis-based units in northern Iraq, including the Task Force Olympia headquarters and the 3rd Brigade, 2nd Infantry Division, the Army's first Stryker vehicle brigade. The 44th was sent to Iraq in November 2003.

While in Iraq Vakoc endeavored to celebrate Mass for soldiers in the 296th Brigade Support Battalion – stationed in Mosul – no matter where they were located, in an area the size of Connecticut, sometimes for only two or three soldiers in remote outposts. In a letter to his sister, Vakoc said, "The safest place for me to be is in the center of God's will, and if that is in the line of fire, that is where I will be."

Vakoc was injured on May 29, 2004 – the day before his twelfth anniversary of his ordination to the priesthood – while returning from saying Mass for soldiers in the field in Iraq when his Humvee struck a roadside bomb (IED). He sustained a severe brain injury. He was treated at an Army field hospital in Baghdad and was then evacuated to Landstuhl Regional Medical Center in Germany. On June 2, 2004, he was transported to Walter Reed Army Medical Center, Washington, D.C.

== Post-injury ==
Vakoc received the Purple Heart in his room at Walter Reed Army Medical Center during a private ceremony limited to immediate family members, Army personnel, and then-U.S. Senator Norm Coleman, who presented the medal. Due to the seriousness of Vakoc's injuries and his unstable condition, Coleman was able to expedite the granting of the award.

After several months, he was transferred to the Minneapolis VA Medical Center, where he lay in a coma for six months. In the late spring of 2005, he began to show signs of improvement. With the help of the Yellow Ribbon Fund, a special computer was donated so that he could communicate with others. On June 1, 2005, a flag – signed by Vakoc and his unit – was given to him. His first message to the visitors who presented the flag was "TIM 4F" (the military code for unfit for duty) and then "OK".

== Death ==
Vakoc died on June 20, 2009, after a fall at a nursing home in New Hope, Minnesota. His funeral was held at the Cathedral of Saint Paul on June 26, 2009. His body was interred in Fort Snelling National Cemetery, Minneapolis. His death was found to be a result of neglect on the part of two employees who did not securely fasten him into a lift.

== Awards and decorations ==
Vakoc was awarded the following medals:

- – Bronze Star
- – Purple Heart
- – Combat Action Badge

== Honors ==
On June 1, 2007, Vakoc received the 2007 Distinguished Alumnus Award from his alma mater, the Saint Paul Seminary School of Divinity.

Knights of Columbus military council #15269 located in Fort Carson, Colorado is named in honor of Father H. Timothy Vakoc.

== See also ==
- Northwood Gratitude and Honor Memorial
- Four Chaplains – four U.S. Army Chaplains killed during World War II
- Roman Catholic Archdiocese for the Military Services, USA
