= Jan-Marc Jouas =

United States Air Force general

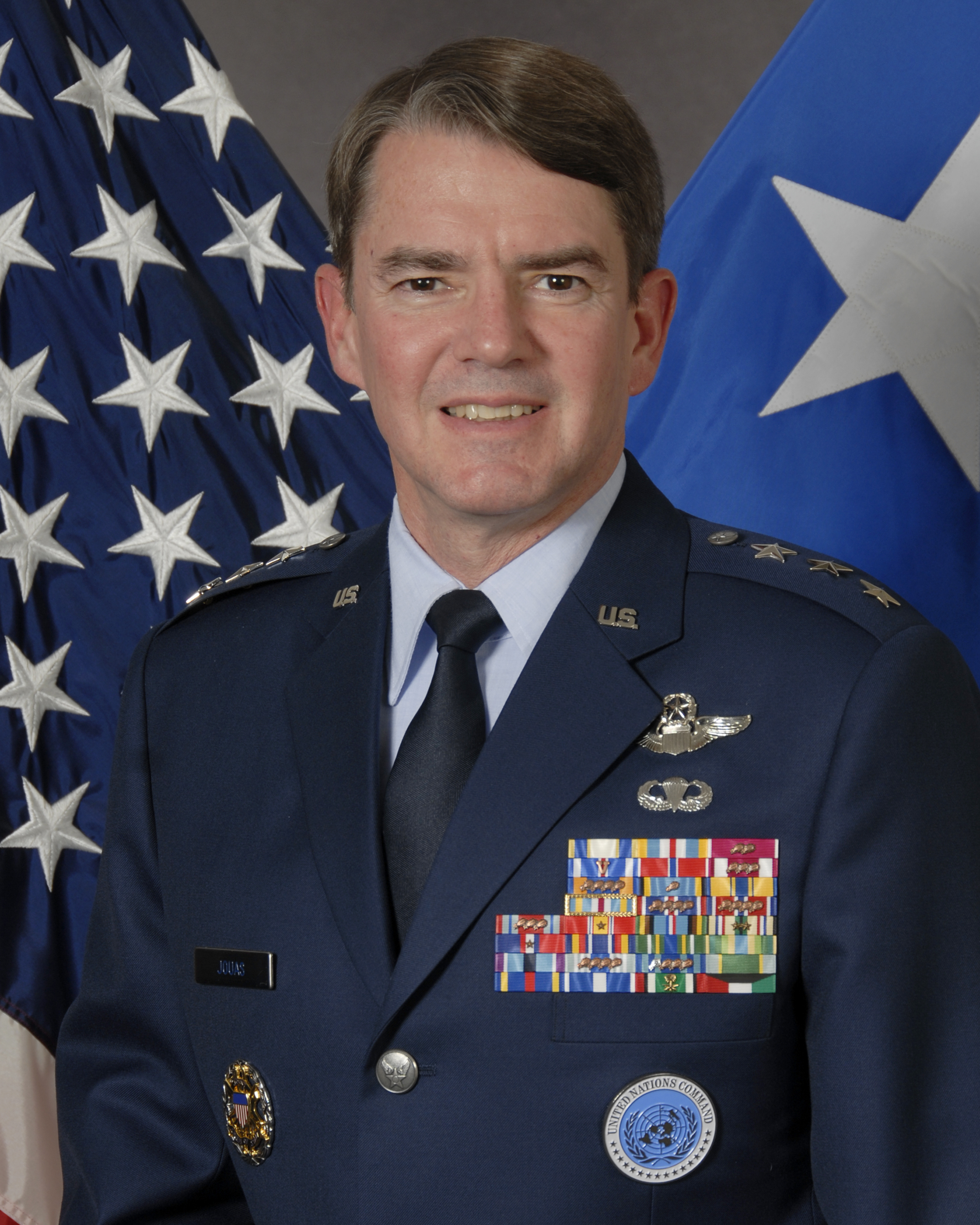
- Military career
- Allegiance: United States
- Branch: United States Air Force
- Service years: 1979–2015
- Rank: Lieutenant General
- Commands: Seventh Air Force; 18th Wing; 354th Fighter Wing; 52nd Operations Group; 422d Test and Evaluation Squadron
- Conflicts: Gulf War; Operation Allied Force
- Awards: Defense Distinguished Service Medal; Air Force Distinguished Service Medal; Defense Superior Service Medal; Legion of Merit (3); Distinguished Flying Cross; Bronze Star Medal

Jan-Marc Jouas is a retired United States Air Force lieutenant general. He served as the Deputy Commander, United Nations Command Korea; Deputy Commander, United States Forces Korea; Commander, Air Component Command, Republic of Korea/United States Combined Forces Command; and Commander, Seventh Air Force, Pacific Air Forces, Osan Air Base, South Korea. He was also the United States representative to the joint committee for the Status of Forces agreement between the two countries. He retired on February 1, 2015.

== Military career ==
Jouas was commissioned in 1979 as a graduate of the United States Air Force Academy. He is a command pilot with extensive operational experience in F-4, F-15 and F-16 aircraft, including more than 80 combat missions. He has commanded at the squadron, group and wing levels, and served as a Joint Staff division chief and special assistant to the Chairman of the Joint Chiefs of Staff. Prior to his current assignment, he was the Pacific Air Forces Director of Operations, Plans, Requirements, and Programs.

=== Commander of the Seventh Air Force ===
Jouas saw the Seventh Air Force's mission as "to deter aggression and maintain the armistice, defend the Republic of Korea, and defeat any attack against the alliance". He has stated that the Seventh Air Force is capable of flying up to 3,000 sorties per day in support of United States Forces Korea during combat operations. During a July 2012 incident between Town Patrol personnel and several Korean nationals, Jouas was praised for his rapid and diplomatic response to the incident, which was credited with reducing tension and minimizing the impact of the incident on South Korea-United States relations. As commander, Jouas had a "zero tolerance policy" toward prostitution and human trafficking. In summer of 2013, Jouas placed the notorious "Juicy" bars in the Songtan Entertainment District off-limits to Seventh Air Force personnel. Jouas commented on the Juicy bars, "There's nothing good about them. I think they further an attitude toward women that's unacceptable. There are a lot of our servicemembers that don't want to go into those bars because they're pretty creepy."

== Personal ==
In the 2024 United States presidential election, Jouas endorsed Kamala Harris.

== Education ==
- 1979 Bachelor of Science degree in international affairs, U.S. Air Force Academy, Colorado Springs, Colorado
- 1984 Squadron Officer School, by correspondence
- 1984 Master of Arts degree in education, Chapman College, Calif.
- 1987 Air Command and Staff College, by seminar
- 1992 Army Command and General Staff College, Fort Leavenworth, Kan.
- 1998 Fellow, Harvard University Center for International Affairs, Cambridge, Mass.
- 2002 Senior Executive Fellowship, Kennedy School of Government, Cambridge, Mass.

== Assignments ==
1. June 1979 – October 1980, student, undergraduate pilot training, Vance AFB, Okla.
2. January 1981 – December 1981, student, F-4E/F-4G combat crew training, George AFB, Calif.
3. December 1981 – May 1984, F-4G pilot, George AFB, Calif.
4. May 1984 – August 1988, F-4G instructor pilot/weapons officer, Spangdahlem Air Base, West Germany
5. August 1988 – June 1991, ops inspector, Tactical Air Command Inspector General, Langley AFB, Va.
6. June 1991 – August 1992, student, Army Command and General Staff College, Fort Leavenworth, Kan.
7. August 1992 – January 1995, F-4G instructor pilot, assistant operations officer, Nellis AFB, Nev
8. January 1995 – August 1995, Chief, 57th Wing Flying Safety, Nellis AFB, Nev.
9. August 1995 – June 1997, Commander, 422nd Test and Evaluation Squadron, Nellis AFB, Nev.
10. July 1997 – June 1998, Fellow, Harvard University Center for International Affairs, Cambridge, Mass.
11. August 1998 – March 2000, Commander, 52nd Operations Group, Spangdahlem AB, Germany
12. April 2000 – March 2002, Chief, Western Europe and NATO Policy Division (J5), Joint Staff, the Pentagon, Washington, D.C.
13. March 2002 – September 2002, special assistant to the Chairman of the Joint Chiefs of Staff, the Pentagon, Washington, D.C.
14. October 2002 – June 2004, Commander, 354th Fighter Wing, Eielson AFB, Alaska
15. June 2004 – January 2006, Commander, 18th Wing, Kadena AB, Japan
16. January 2006 – May 2007, Vice Commander, Air Intelligence Agency, Lackland AFB, Texas
17. May 2007 – July 2008, Vice Commander, Air Force Intelligence, Surveillance and Reconnaissance Agency, Lackland AFB, Texas
18. July 2008 – September 2008, special assistant to Commander, Pacific Air Forces, Hickam AFB, Hawaii
19. September 2008 – December 2011, Director, Operations, Plans, Requirements and Programs, Headquarters Pacific Air Forces, Hickam AFB, Hawaii
20. January 2012 – January 2015, Deputy Commander, United Nations Command Korea; Deputy Commander, U.S. Forces Korea; Commander, Air Component Command, Republic of Korea/U.S. Combined Forces Command; and Commander, 7th Air Force, Pacific Air Forces, Osan AB, South Korea

== Flight information ==
Rating: Command pilot
Flight hours: More than 3,100
Aircraft flown: F-4, F-15, F-16.

== Awards and decorations ==
US Air Force Command Pilot Badge
Basic Parachutist Badge
Office of the Joint Chiefs of Staff Identification Badge
United Nations Command Badge

Defense Distinguished Service Medal
Air Force Distinguished Service Medal
Defense Superior Service Medal
Legion of Merit with two bronze oak leaf clusters
Distinguished Flying Cross with Valor device
Bronze Star Medal
Meritorious Service Medal with three oak leaf clusters
Air Medal with four oak leaf clusters
Aerial Achievement Medal with oak leaf cluster
Air Force Commendation Medal
Joint Meritorious Unit Award
Air Force Outstanding Unit Award with four oak leaf clusters
Air Force Organizational Excellence Award with four oak leaf clusters
Combat Readiness Medal with three oak leaf clusters
National Defense Service Medal with one bronze service star
Armed Forces Expeditionary Medal
Southwest Asia Service Medal with two service stars
Kosovo Campaign Medal with service star
Global War on Terrorism Service Medal
Korea Defense Service Medal
Armed Forces Service Medal
Humanitarian Service Medal
Air Force Overseas Long Tour Service Ribbon with four oak leaf clusters
Air Force Longevity Service Award with one silver and three bronze oak leaf clusters
Small Arms Expert Marksmanship Ribbon with service star
Air Force Training Ribbon
Bundeswehr Cross of Honor in Silver (Republic of Germany)
Order of National Security Merit (Republic of Korea), Gukseon Medal
NATO Medal for Kosovo
Kuwait Liberation Medal (Saudi Arabia)
Kuwait Liberation Medal (Kuwait)

== Effective dates of promotion ==
United States Air Force Academy Cadet – Class of 1979

Rank	Date
Second Lieutenant	May 30, 1979
First Lieutenant	May 30, 1981
Captain	May 30, 1983
Major	December 1, 1988
Lieutenant Colonel	June 1, 1993
Colonel	August 1, 1998
Brigadier General	December 1, 2004
Major General	May 7, 2009
Lieutenant General	January 6, 2012
