= Sex Among Allies =

Study on prostitution around U.S. military bases in South Korea

Sex Among Allies: Military Prostitution in U.S.-Korea Relations
- Author: Katharine Moon
- Language: English
- Publication date: 1997
- Publication place: United States

Sex Among Allies: Military Prostitution in U.S.-Korea Relations is a study by American academic Katharine Moon on prostitution around U.S. Military bases in South Korea during the 1970s. This study was published in 1997.

== ISBN ==
- ISBN 0231106424
- ISBN 0231106432
- ISBN 9780231106436

== See also ==
- Prostitutes in South Korea for the U.S. military
