= Dongducheon Rock Festival =

Music festival in South Korea

- Genre: Rock
- Locations: Dongducheon, South Korea
- Years active: 1999–present
- Website: Official web site

Dongducheon Rock Festival is an annual rock festival, which has been held in late summer since 1999 in Dongducheon, South Korea. The motto of the festival includes hopes and wishes for peaceful reunion of South and North Korea. It is considered one of major music festivals in South Korea.

== Line-ups ==
1999
The line-up included Cul-de-sac, Dr.Core 911, Rust Eye, Black Syndrome, Harlequin, Blackhole, Do Won Kyoung, Sinchon Blues, Love And Peace, Boohwal, Sinawe, and Yoon Do-hyun.

2000
The festival was not held.

2001
The line-up included Megadeth, BUCK-TICK, Cul-de-sac, Shin Joong-hyun, Yoon Do-hyun, Do Won Kyoung, Kim Kyung-ho, Lee Eun-mi, Crash, Crying Nut, Sinawe, Blackhole, Gigs, Black Syndrome, 3rd Line Butterfly, Rainysun, Bulldog Mansion, Diablo, No Brain, Pia, Jeremy, Frida Kahlo, and Lazybone.

2002
The line-up included Peterpan Complex, Siberian Husky, Naked, Samcheong, Jihad, Johnny Royal, Onnine Ibalgwan, Vassline, Blackhole, No Brain, Grand Slam, Lazybone, Gaia, Lorelei, Jeremy, Black Syndrome, Do Won Kyoung, Crying Nut, and Jun In Kwon.

2003
The line-up included DOA, Black Hole, Do Won Kyoung, Cinnamon, Crash, Jeremy, Black Syndrome, Lolita No.18, Onnine Ibalgwan, No Brain, Transfixion, Sinawe, Schizo, Gaia, Hammer and Niflheim.

2004
The line-up included Oh! Brothers, The Metal Asia, Jeremy, Black Hole, Oathean, Wiretrap In My Ear, No Brain, Black Syndrome, Do Won Kyoung, and N.EX.T.

2005
The line-up included Vanila Unity, Crow, Sangsang Band, Candy Man, Do Won Kyoung, Boohwal, and Kim Jong-seo.

2006
The line-up included Emoticon, Super Kidd, Island City, Oh! Brothers, Vanilla Unity, Vassline, Schizo, Transfixion, Do Won Kyoung, No Brain, and YB.

2007
The line-up included Wiretrap In My Ear, Pia, Kim Kyung-ho, N.EX.T, Love And Peace, Mir, Dr. Core 911, Oathen, Crow, Diablo, Schizo, Bloody Cookie, Do Won Kyoung, Emoticon, Mad Fret, No.1 Korean, Peterpan Complex, Eve, Vassline, and Transfixion.

2008
The line-up included Anthrax (American band), Baekdusan, Crash, Moon Hee-joon, Wiretrap In My Ear, Kim Jong Seo, Insooni, N.EX.T, Survive, Diablo, Crow, Vassline, Oathean, Galaxy Express, Mad Fret, Kim Jong-seo, Cherry Filter, Schizo, Transfixion, Dr. Core 911, Crying Nut, 404 Not Found, Vanila Unity, Boohwal, Do Won Kyoung, Kang San-eh, Maya, No.1 Korea, and Super Kidd.

2010
The 12th edition of the festival was held at the Soyosan Tourist Resort in Donducheon from August 14-15, 2010. The line-up included Killer Cuts, Morning of July, Geonadeul Locust, Yi Chihyeon and Friends, Yi Hyeonseok Band, Kim Mokkyung Band, Baekdusan Band, Love and Peace, Jongseo Kim, and Spring Summer Autumn and Winter (SSAW) for the first day, and Vanilla City, Crow, Crying Nut, Transfiction, Diablo, Kim Soochul Bank, Blackhole, Pia, NEXT, and YB for the second day.

== See also ==
- List of music festivals in South Korea
