= Katharine Moon =

American Professor of political science

Katharine H. S. Moon is an American academic. Moon is Professor in the Department of Political Science at Wellesley College. She is also the inaugural holder of the SK-Korea Foundation Chair in Korea Studies and senior fellow at the Brookings Institution's Center for East Asia Policy Studies.

Moon was born in San Francisco, California and has a bachelor's degree from Smith College and a Ph.D. from Princeton University.

== See also ==
- Sex Among Allies
