= Camp Nimble =

US military facility in Gyeonggi Province, South Korea

Camp Nimble was a US military facility located in Dongducheon, Gyeonggi Province, South Korea, across the Chuncheon River from Camp Casey. Closed and returned in July 2006, it was home to the 2nd Infantry Division's A and B Companies of the 702nd Main Support Battalion.

== Alpha Company ==
Company A provides food, water, and supplies to all 2ID soldiers and provides back-up support to forward and aviation support battalions. It deploys teams to produce water and deliver rations forward and sends 5,000 gallon tankers of fuel forward to logistical release points. Receives, stores and issues supplies at the Division's warehouse and is prepared to deploy all supplies to the division support area.

== Bravo Company ==
Company B provides cargo truck support for all 2ID soldiers, with emphasis for two air assault battalions and support on the DMZ. Provides tractor and trailer support for movement of supplies and rations forward. Provides Heavy Equipment Transport System (HET) for movement of tracked vehicles over Korean roads.

== Facilities ==
Camp Nimble hosted an AAFES post exchange, barber shop, and laundry pickup. Morale Welfare Recreation (MWR) facilities included a gymnasium, racquetball court, and an NCO/Enlisted Club. Camp Nimble was one of the forty-two camps north of Seoul authorized Hardship Duty Pay of $150 per month. The extra pay provides meaningful financial recognition to troops assigned.

Since the land has been returned to the ROK, there are plans to develop either a college or a park on the property. All facilities have been leveled to the ground.

== See also ==
- Main Support Battalion
- Forward Support Battalion
- Logistical Release Point
- List of United States Army installations in South Korea
