= Camp Edwards (South Korea) =

Former US Army installation in South Korea

Camp Edwards is a former United States Army installation in South Korea home to the 82nd Engineer Company, C Company 702nd Maintenance Battalion, D Company, 2nd Medical Battalion, 2nd S&T Detachment and the 618th Medical Battalion (Dental). Named after Medal of Honor recipient Junior D. Edwards, the camp was closed in 2004 and its equipment was moved to Camp Casey. Following its closure, the land was purchased by Ewha Womans University.

On 16 October 1989, Headquarters and Headquarters Company, 296th Support Battalion, assigned to the 2nd Infantry Division in Korea was located at Camp Edwards, Korea in direct support of 3rd Brigade, 2nd Infantry Division. The soldiers of the battalion provided support to the units keeping watch on the Korean demilitarized zone. It was there that the Battalion earned its nickname "Frontline Support." On 16 September 1992, three years later, the 296th Forward Battalion was inactivated.

== Location ==
37°46′39″N 126°47′10″E: Camp proper
37°46′52.7″N 126°47′21.4″E: East compound (Note: Circa 1985, B Company (1/31 INF) was garrisoned at a separate compound on the east side of National Route 1—hence, "Camp Edwards East"—with "Camp Edwards West" being Camp Edwards proper.)

- Yeongtae-ri (영태리) in the Wollong-myeon sub-administrative district of Paju-si, Gyeonggi-do.
