= Omma Poom Park =

Park in Paju, South Korea

- Location: Bongilcheon-ri, Paju, Gyeonggi Province, South Korea
- Coordinates: 37°44′58″N 126°49′11.8″E

Omma Poom (Korean: 엄마품동산; lit. Mother's Bosom Park) is a memorial park in Bongilcheon-ri, Paju, Gyeonggi Province, South Korea. It is dedicated to South Koreans who were adopted abroad. "It was conceived in conjunction with Me & Korea, an organization supporting Korean adoptees in the US."
