= Camp Castle (South Korea) =

US Army military installation in South Korea

Coordinates: 37°56′03″N 127°03′23″E

- Dongducheon, South Korea

Site information
- Type: Army post
- Owner: United States; South Korea

Garrison information
- Garrison: 2nd Infantry Division

Camp Castle was a 48.6-acre (197,000 m^{2}), United States Army military installation in Dongducheon, South Korea, and home to elements of the U.S. 2nd Infantry Division. It is adjacent but not connected to the larger Camp Casey. Camp Castle served as home to the 2nd Engineer Battalion (known colloquially as "Two E") from 1972 to 2004 and was home to the 70th Support Battalion, including a maintenance and distribution company, Alpha Company, a maintenance company on adjacent Camp Casey and a headquarters and headquarters company. Camp Castle is currently (2012) in the process of being returned to the ROK (except for one portion, called Camp Castle North). The camp was unique in that it was split by a major Korean thoroughfare. The unit's offices, dining facility, and barracks were situated on the east side of the roadway while the motorpool was on the west side. A pedestrian bridge completed in 2002 connects the two halves to prevent pedestrian traffic on the roadway. The camp is only large enough for one battalion and contains several old buildings to include offices, barracks which are now vacant, officers quarters, and a closed dining facility. It was one of the most forward-stationed US-exclusive bases on the South Korean Peninsula, about 9 mi (14 km) from the DMZ by air. The Area I HazMart (hazardous materials recycling and redistribution facility) is located on Camp Castle North, as is a large warehouse for quarters furniture. The rest of Camp Castle North, including abandoned 300,000-gallon fuel storage tanks, was slated for turnover in 2013. It was returned to the South Korean government in 2015. Camp Castle East and West is being converted to a local college campus.

== See also ==
- List of United States Army installations in South Korea
