= Camp Hovey =

United States Army base in Gyeonggi Province, South Korea

Coordinates: 37°54′18″N 127°05′03″E

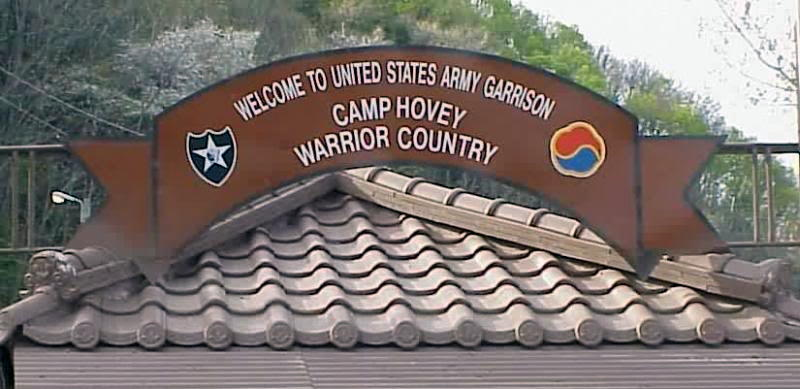
Camp Hovey Gate

Camp Hovey is a United States Army military base in Dongducheon, Gyeonggi Province, South Korea. It was named after Master Sergeant Howard Hovey who was killed in action at Pork Chop Hill during the Korean War. The camp is adjacent to the larger Camp Casey connected by a road known as "Hovey Cut". The nearest city to Camp Hovey is Dongducheon (also spelled Tongduch'on), which is roughly 15 miles (24 km) from the Korean Demilitarized Zone (DMZ). There is a south gate into Camp Hovey from Gwangam-dong village.

Prior to the deactivation of the 1st ABCT, Camp Hovey was home to 1st ABCT Headquarters; 1st Battalion, 15th Field Artillery; 1st Brigade Special Troops Bn; 4th Chemical Company; and 4th Squadron, 7th Cavalry Regiment. C Co 1st Bn 503rd Infantry.

Camp Hovey has an AAFES shoppette, Hovey Lanes Bowling Alley, Iron Triangle All-Ranks Club, Hovey Boys 10 HQ, DOD Community Bank, post office, athletic fields, Hovey Gym and indoor Swimming Pool, Library, Troop Medical Center, Military Clothing Store, Barber Shop, Dry Cleaners, New Car Sales, LG U+ Phone and Internet Store, Furniture Store, Tailor Shop, Mini-Mall, Bedding Store, Anthony's Pizza, AAFES American Cafe, Krispy Kreme Donuts, KATUSA snack bar and a DFAC (Dining Facility). Camp Hovey is one of the camps north of Seoul authorized Hardship Duty Pay of $150 per month as of 1 January 2001.

It is part of an area containing many installations known as the "Casey Enclave". Camp Hovey, together with other U.S. Army camps north of Seoul, was scheduled for closure in the 2019 time frame, with units moving to Camp Humphreys. Camp Hovey did not close down and is now the home of the Army's Rotational Stryker Brigade's Headquarters.

== See also ==
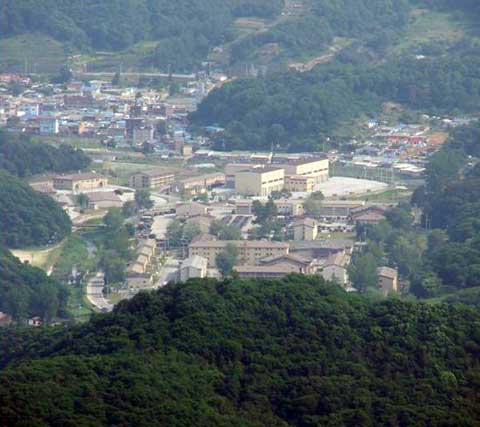
- Aerial view of Camp Hovey from the East.
  List of United States Army installations in South Korea
