= Dongducheon =

City in Gyeonggi, South Korea

Coordinates: 37°55′N 127°04′E

- Municipal City
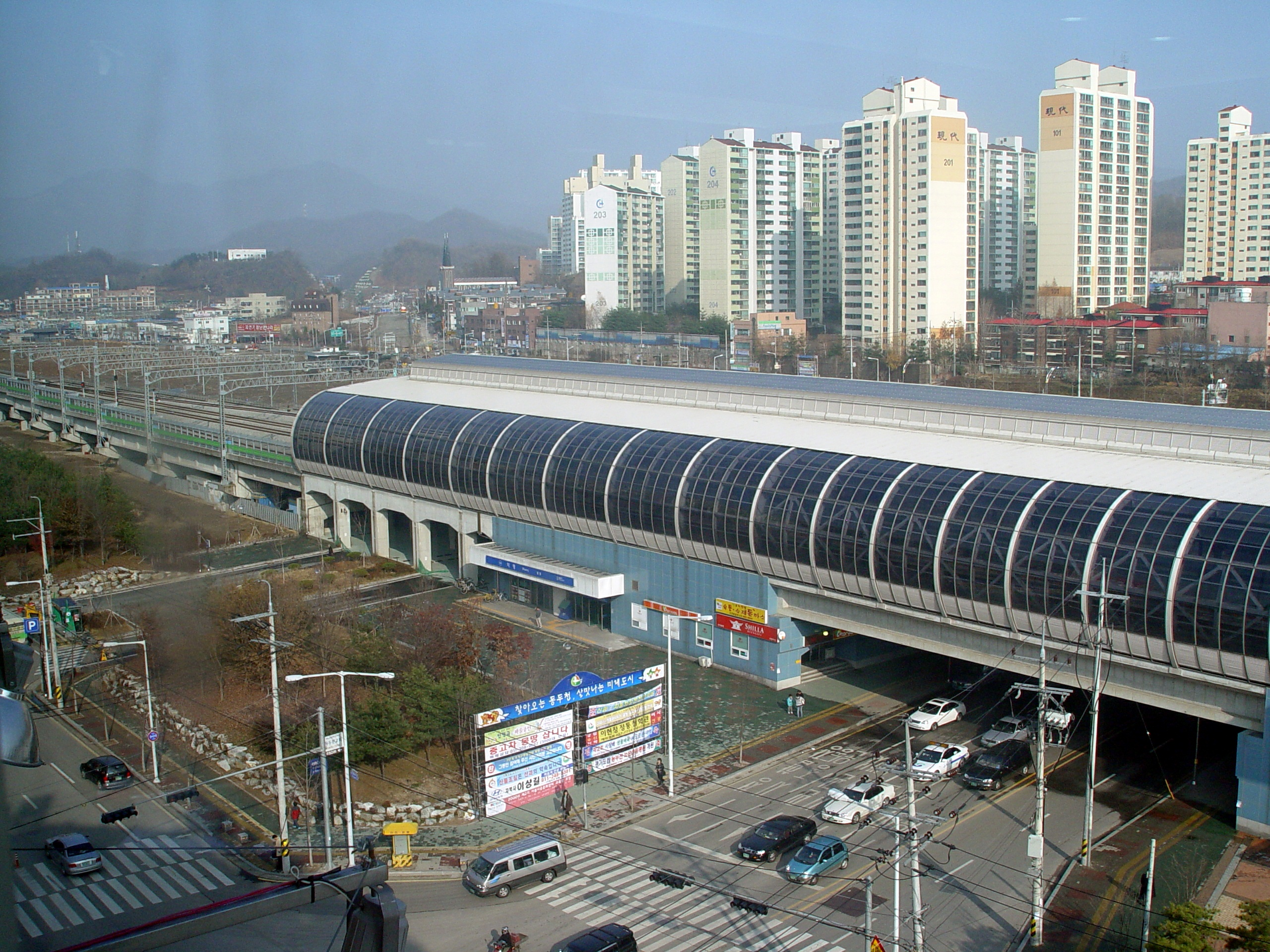
- Panoramic view of Dongducheon Jihaeng Station in Dongducheon

- Flag Emblem of Dongducheon

- Location in South Korea
- Country: South Korea
- Region: Gyeonggi Province (Sudogwon)
- Administrative divisions: 8 dong

Area
  - Total: 95.66 km^{2} (36.93 sq mi)

Population (September 2024)
  - Total: 87,099
  - Density: 864/km^{2} (2,240/sq mi)
  - Dialect: Seoul
- Website: Dongducheon Office

Korean name
- Hangul: 동두천시
- Hanja: 東豆川市
- RR: Dongducheon-si
- MR: Tongduch'ŏn-si

Dongducheon (Korean: 동두천; Korean pronunciation: [ˈto̞ŋ.du.tɕʰʌ̹n]) is a city in Gyeonggi Province, South Korea.

The city, to the north of Seoul, is strategically important for the defense of the Korean capital. The main camps of the United States Second Infantry Division are in the city, and the division command is at Uijeongbu.

== History ==
Under Goguryeo, the dynasty's territory extended southward into the Korean peninsula, and Dongducheon became part of the kingdom in the form of naeulmae hyun (a certain form of ancient village land holding). Later, Dongducheon became Sacheon village of Unified Silla in the North-South States Period. It was part of the district of Yangju in Goryeo.

- On January 1, 1963, Idam-myeon, Yangju-gun was promoted to Dongducheon-eup.
- On July 1, 1981, Dongducheon-si was established with jurisdiction over the entire Dongducheon-eup area of Yangju-gun.
- On February 15, 1983, Sangpae-ri, Eunhyeon-myeon, Yangju-gun was incorporated into Dongducheon-si.

=== Modern ===
In 1963, its status was raised to that of a township, Tongduchon (eup). In 1981, Dongducheon City was established, encompassing Yangju county.

== Climate ==
Dongducheon has a monsoon-influenced humid continental climate (Köppen: Dwa) with cold, dry winters and hot, rainy summers.

Climate data for Dongducheon (1999–2020 normals, extremes 1998–present)
Month	Jan	Feb	Mar	Apr	May	Jun	Jul	Aug	Sep	Oct	Nov	Dec	Year
Record high °C (°F)	15.0 (59.0)	19.8 (67.6)	24.7 (76.5)	31.0 (87.8)	33.4 (92.1)	35.5 (95.9)	36.2 (97.2)	38.7 (101.7)	35.0 (95.0)	29.7 (85.5)	26.2 (79.2)	16.3 (61.3)	38.7 (101.7)
Mean daily maximum °C (°F)	2.4 (36.3)	5.8 (42.4)	12.1 (53.8)	19.0 (66.2)	24.5 (76.1)	28.2 (82.8)	29.0 (84.2)	30.1 (86.2)	26.3 (79.3)	20.5 (68.9)	12.2 (54.0)	3.9 (39.0)	17.8 (64.0)
Daily mean °C (°F)	−3.8 (25.2)	−0.8 (30.6)	5.0 (41.0)	11.6 (52.9)	17.4 (63.3)	21.8 (71.2)	24.3 (75.7)	24.9 (76.8)	20.1 (68.2)	13.1 (55.6)	5.7 (42.3)	−1.9 (28.6)	11.5 (52.7)
Mean daily minimum °C (°F)	−9.0 (15.8)	−6.2 (20.8)	−0.8 (30.6)	5.2 (41.4)	11.3 (52.3)	16.7 (62.1)	20.9 (69.6)	21.2 (70.2)	15.3 (59.5)	7.4 (45.3)	0.5 (32.9)	−6.9 (19.6)	6.3 (43.3)
Record low °C (°F)	−26.2 (−15.2)	−19.7 (−3.5)	−10.7 (12.7)	−4.7 (23.5)	2.6 (36.7)	8.0 (46.4)	15.3 (59.5)	12.1 (53.8)	4.4 (39.9)	−4.7 (23.5)	−10.1 (13.8)	−18.0 (−0.4)	−26.2 (−15.2)
Average precipitation mm (inches)	18.4 (0.72)	26.0 (1.02)	32.0 (1.26)	73.2 (2.88)	95.2 (3.75)	130.5 (5.14)	431.7 (17.00)	347.5 (13.68)	137.9 (5.43)	55.1 (2.17)	47.4 (1.87)	22.2 (0.87)	1,417.1 (55.79)
Average precipitation days (≥ 0.1 mm)	5.2	5.3	7.2	9.0	9.0	10.3	16.8	14.8	8.4	6.5	8.3	7.6	108.4
Average snowy days	7.1	5.3	3.6	0.1	0.0	0.0	0.0	0.0	0.0	0.0	2.0	6.6	24.6
Average relative humidity (%)	60.9	57.5	55.3	55.3	62.3	68.4	79.5	77.8	73.6	69.3	64.9	62.4	65.6
Mean monthly sunshine hours	183.7	180.8	209.6	206.0	231.2	203.9	128.7	164.1	182.4	201.2	160.6	169.6	2,221.8
Percentage possible sunshine	57.3	56.4	51.1	48.9	47.1	41.0	24.3	35.4	43.7	53.8	52.3	54.8	46.0
Source: Korea Meteorological Administration (snow and percent sunshine 1981–2010)

== Festivals ==
Since 1999, Dongducheon has annually hosted the Dongducheon Rock Festival, one of the biggest rock festivals in South Korea. In 2007, the festival was held at Camp Nimble, a former US Army installation returned to South Korea.

A maple festival is held every autumn in several streets and parts of the city.

== Education ==
There are 10 high schools, 15 middle schools, 38 elementary schools, and Hanbuk University.

== U.S. Military Bases ==
- Camp Casey
- Camp Castle (mostly abandoned)
- Camp Hovey
- Camp Nimble (mostly abandoned)

Because of the numerous U.S. military bases in the area, Dongducheon is also a major camptown that developed in significant part to meet the interests of U.S. military personnel.

== Notable people from Dongducheon ==
- Jang Dong-shin (장동신), South Korean ice sledge hockey player and wheelchair fencer.
- Oh Young-hwan (오영환), South Korean firefighter, essayist and politician.
- Kim Dong-jin (김동진), former South Korean footballer.
- Hwang Ji-soo (황지수), former South Korean footballer.
- Kim Do-heon (김도헌), South Korean professional footballer.
- Na-mi (Real Name: Gim Myeong-ok, 김명옥), South Korean singer.
- Yang Se-hyung (양세형), South Korean actor, comedian, MC and older brother of Yang Se-chan.
- Yang Se-chan (양세찬), South Korean actor, comedian, singer and younger brother of Yang Se-hyung.
- J-NO (Real Name: Yoon Dae Hyuk, 윤대혁), singer, dancer and K-pop idol, member of K-pop boygroup APL.
- Yeeun (Real Name: Jang Ye-eun, 장예은), singer, rapper, dancer, model, MC and K-pop idol, member of K-pop girlgroup CLC.
- Bit-to (Real Name: Lee Chang-hyun, 이창현), singer, rapper, dancer and K-pop idol, member of K-pop boygroup UP10TION

== See also ==
- List of cities in South Korea
- Kijichon
