= Kijichon =

Military base camptowns in South Korea

- Hangul: 기지촌
- Hanja: 基地村
- RR: Gijichon
- MR: Kijich'on

A kijichon (Korean: 기지촌, literally "Camp town") was a type of red-light district in South Korea located near military bases of the United States Forces Korea (USFK) to provide prostitution to American soldiers. They were generally located near the Korean demilitarized zone in the north of South Korea.

Kijichon first appeared after the Korean War in the 1950s as a way for U.S. authorities to manage the inevitable sexual liaisons between American soldiers and Korean women, as Korea was considered "too dangerous a locale" for American women and children, and interracial marriage was illegal in the United States. The South Korean government tolerated the kijichon, considering it easier to conceal the prostitution and crimes committed by American soldiers in more rural areas, away from the general population. All of the businesses in these towns that explicitly cater to U.S. military personnel had to be "licensed by the Korea Special Tourist Association." This was deemed as "necessary for soldiers to continue protecting South Korea, and was beneficial for economic development".

Kijichon were primarily populated by the poorest and otherwise marginalized Koreans, with inhabitants often not interacting with South Korean society at large due to the stigma associated with living and working in them. Women who worked in kijichon were particularly stigmatized as there was a sentiment that they chose to lead that life. As such, these women rarely leaved and when they did, they hid their lives from their families. Poor women (some of whom were also former comfort women) were actively recruited to work in kijichon, as they were considered expendable and could be used to "protect the purity of "respectable" Korean women."
