= Camp Casey, South Korea =

American military base in Dongducheon, South Korea

Coordinates: 37°55′19″N 127°05′08″E

Camp Casey
- Dongducheon, South Korea

Site information
- Type: Army post
- Owner: United States; South Korea
- Controlled by: United States Army

Site history
- Built: 1952
- In use: 1952–present

Garrison information
- Garrison: 2nd Infantry Division

Camp Casey (Korean: 캠프 케이시) is a U.S. military base on Soyosan Mountain in Dongducheon (also sometimes spelled Tongduchŏn or TDC), South Korea, 40 miles (64 km) north of Seoul, South Korea. Camp Casey was named in 1952 after Major Hugh Boyd Casey, who was killed in a plane crash near the camp site during the Korean War. Camp Casey is one of several U.S. Army bases in South Korea near the Korean Demilitarized Zone (DMZ). Camp Casey, Camp Hovey, and neighboring Camp Castle and Camp Nimble hold the main armor, 7th Division of a bridging engineer company as well, and mechanized infantry elements of the 2nd Infantry Division (United States) in South Korea. Camp Castle has been largely abandoned, with only a warehouse remaining. Camp Nimble was severely damaged during a flood in July 2011, and has been abandoned except for an unmanned aerial vehicle (UAV) company. Camp Casey spans 3,500 acres (14 km2) and is occupied by 6,300 military personnel and 2,500 civilians. There are plans for the relocation of most of the 2nd Infantry Division to Camp Humphreys which are underway with the latest estimate for completion being 2022. The Field Artillery Battalion remains for now at Camp Casey, while Camp Hovey is to be closed.

Camp Casey was home to several of the main combat units of the Second Infantry Division. Among them were the Second Battalion of the 9th Infantry Regiment and the First Battalion of the 72nd Armored Regiment (Crusaders). The 70th Brigade Support Battalion is currently located on Camp Casey, providing support to the line battalions of the 210th Field Artillery Brigade as well as depot and medical support to everyone stationed in the Camp Casey area.

U.S. Private Kenneth Lee Markle III, who committed the 1992 murder of Yun Geum-i, was part of Camp Casey's 5-20 infantry platoon at the time. As such, protests against her murder were held directly outside the gates of Camp Casey and Camp Hovey for weeks.

== See also ==
- List of United States Army installations in South Korea
