= Anti-American sentiment in Korea =

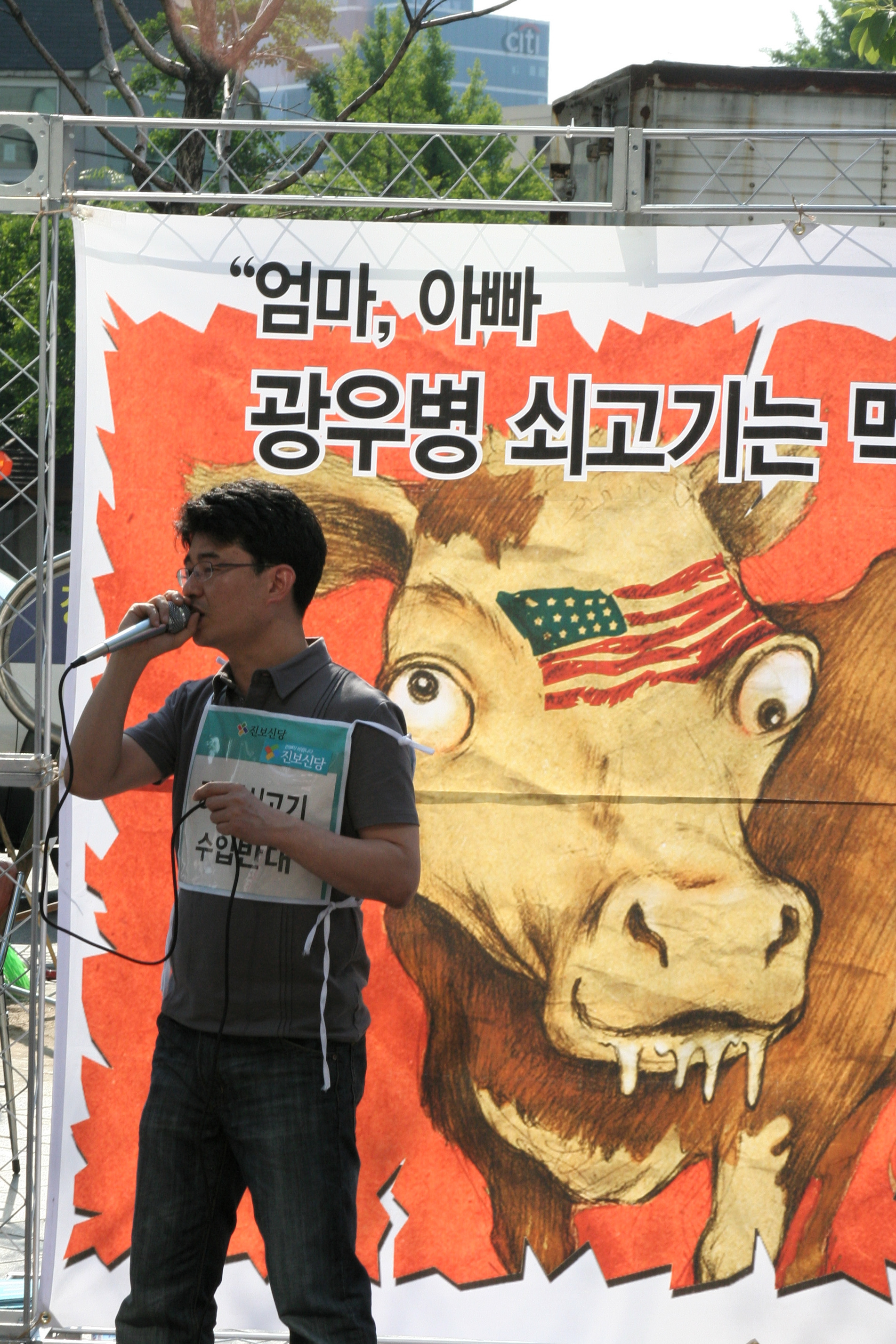
South Korean protesters protesting against the U.S. Beef Agreement on 11 May 2008.

Anti-American sentiment in Korea began with the earliest contact between the two nations and continued after the division of Korea and Korean War. According to an October 2025 KStatResearch poll, 56% of South Koreans had a favorable view of the United States, while 40% had a negative view.

One particular focus of such sentiment has focused on the presence and behavior of American military personnel (USFK) on the peninsula. There have been a number of high-profile cases of American soldiers being involved in violence against Korean people, with an example being the 2002 Yangju highway incident, as well as the 2008 Camp Humphreys expansion controversy. The ongoing U.S. military presence in South Korea, especially at Yongsan Garrison in central Seoul, remains a contentious issue. While protests have arisen over specific incidents, they may be reflective of deeper historical, anti-Western sentiment. Anti-American sentiment has also increased during the second presidency of Donald Trump due to doubts about the reliability of the United States as an ally.

== History ==
=== Pre-Korean War ===
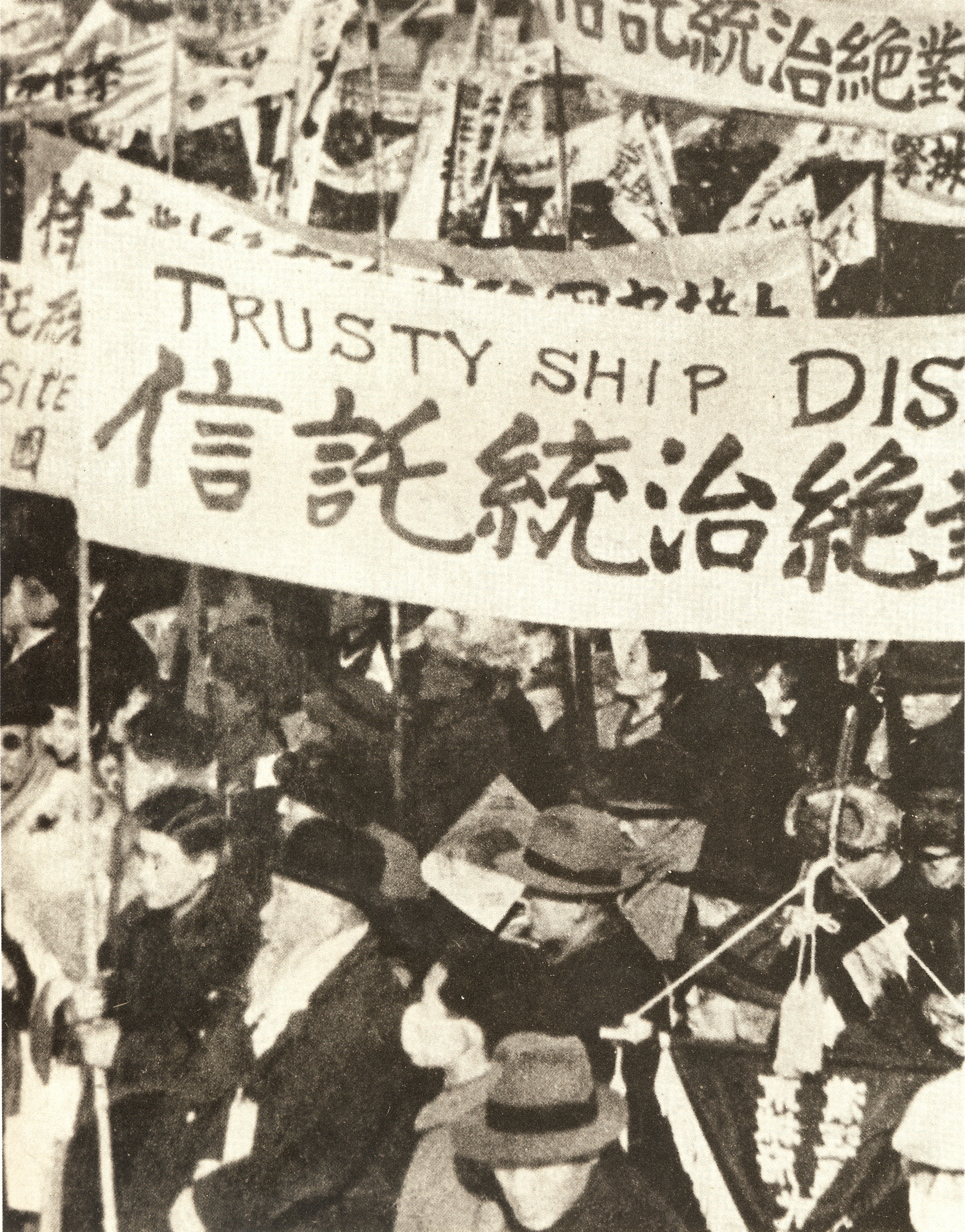
Anti-Trusteeship Campaign in December 1945.

After the Japanese defeat in World War II, U.S. and Soviet forces entered the Korean Peninsula and established separate military administrations in the south and north respectively. The right-wing faction in the South, led by Syngman Rhee, defined the trusteeship plan of the Moscow Conference as "recolonization by the Soviets" and began pushing for the immediate establishment of a sovereign government, excluding the left-wing faction in the North that mostly supported the plan. Ultimately, a general election supervised by the UN, which was blocked in the Soviet-controlled north, was held and enshrined the division of Korea. After the boycotts, strikes, and multiple rebellions by left-wing in the South against the general election all failed, most of the remaining factions fled to North Korea to escape persecution.

While the early days of the Syngman Rhee's administration with former Korean independence activists could not be described as distinctly pro-American when compared to the Korea Democratic Party (KDP), the largest opposition party which included right-wing landowners and former pro-Japanese collaborators, the context of the Cold War blurred their differences under the motto of anti-communism, thereby solidifying the ideological division of Korea as 'communism versus anti-communism'.

=== Korean War ===
==== No Gun Ri massacre ====
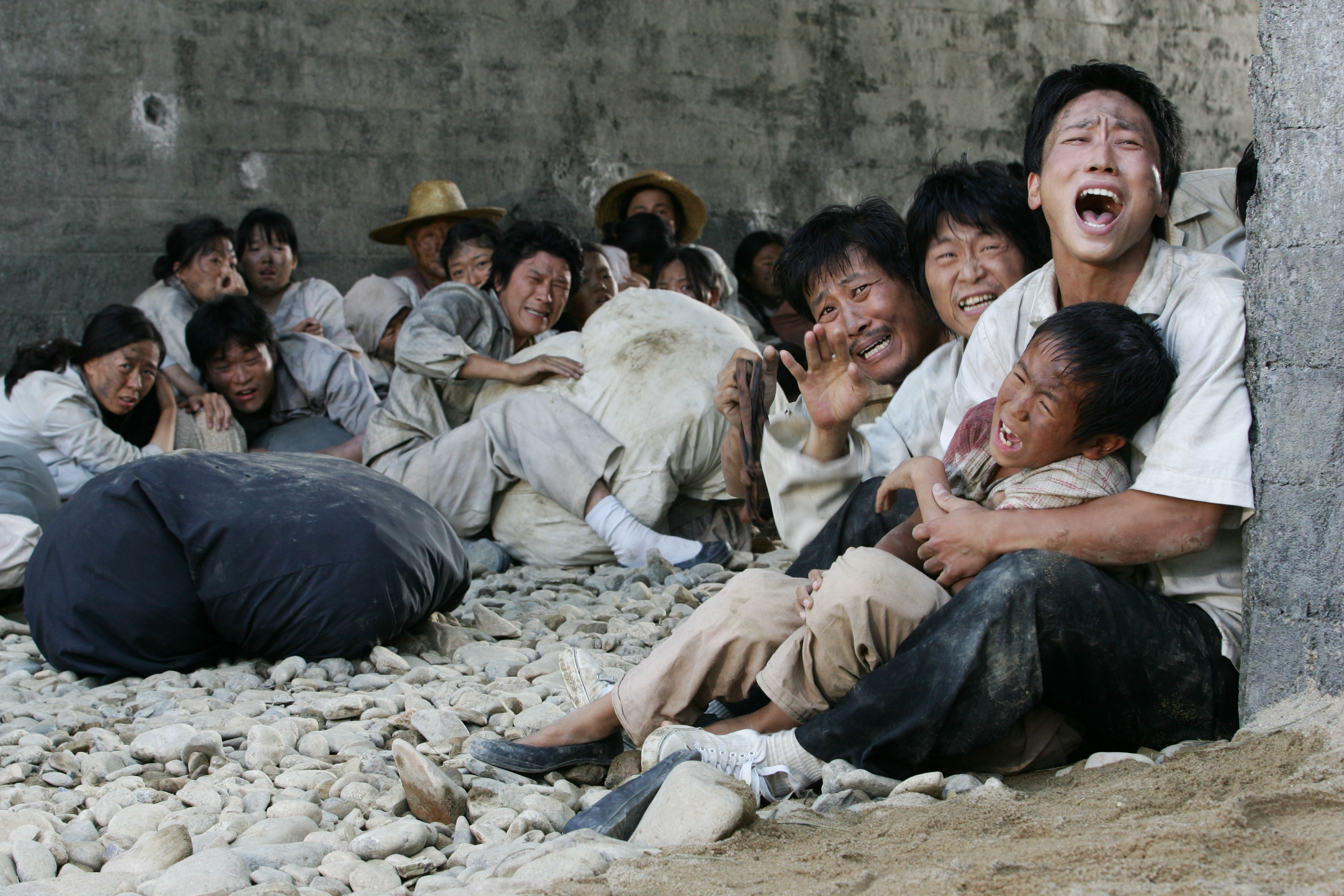
A depiction of the scene under the No Gun Ri bridge from the 2009 South Korean feature film A Little Pond.

The No Gun Ri Massacre occurred on 26–29 July 1950, early in the Korean War, when South Korean refugees were killed by the 7th U.S. Cavalry Regiment (and a U.S. air attack) at a railroad bridge near the village of No Gun Ri (revised Romanization Nogeun-ri), 100 miles (160 km) southeast of Seoul. In 2005, the South Korean government certified the names of 163 dead or missing (mostly women, children and old men) and 55 wounded. It said many other victims' names were not reported. Survivors generally estimated 400 dead. The U.S. Army cites the number of casualties as "unknown." Along with the My Lai Massacre in Vietnam, it was one of the largest single massacres of civilians by U.S. land forces in the 20th century.

The civilian killings gained widespread attention when the Associated Press published articles in 1999 in which 7th Cavalry veterans corroborated survivors' accounts, articles that later won the Pulitzer Prize for Investigative Reporting. 7th Cavalry veteran Joe Jackman states, "there was kids out there, it didn't matter what it was, eight to 80, blind, crippled or crazy, they shot 'em all." The AP also uncovered warfront orders to fire on refugees, given out of fear of enemy North Korean infiltration. After years of rejecting claims by survivors, the Pentagon conducted an investigation and, in 2001, acknowledged the killings, but referred to the three-day event as "an unfortunate tragedy inherent to war and not a deliberate killing." The U.S. rejected survivors' demands for an apology and compensation. Inconsistencies with the Pentagon's investigation led to Korean War veteran Pete McCloskey (who had been brought in to advise on the report) state, "the government will always lie about embarrassing matters."

South Korean investigators disagreed with Pentagon findings, saying they believed 7th Cavalry troops were ordered to fire on the refugees. The survivors' group called the U.S. report a "whitewash." Additional archival documents later emerged showing U.S. commanders ordering the shooting of refugees during this period, declassified documents found but not disclosed by Pentagon investigators. Among them was a report by the U.S. ambassador in South Korea in July 1950 that the U.S. military had adopted a theater-wide policy of firing on approaching refugee groups. Despite demands, the U.S. investigation was not reopened.

Prompted by the exposure of No Gun Ri, survivors of similar alleged incidents in 1950–1951 filed reports with the Seoul government. In 2008 an investigative commission said more than 200 cases of alleged large-scale civilian killings by the U.S. military had been registered, mostly air attacks. More documents detailing refugee 'kill' orders were unearthed at the U.S. national archives and point to the widespread targeting of refugees by commanders well after No Gun Ri massacre. In August 1950 there were orders detailing that refugees crossing the Naktong River be shot. Later in the same month, General Gay ordered artillery units to target civilians on the battlefield. In January 1951, the U.S. 8th Army was detailing all units in Korea that refugees be attacked with all available fire including bombing. In August 1950, 80 civilians are reported to have been killed while seeking sanctuary in a shrine by the village of Kokaan-Ri, near Masan in South Korea. Other survivors recall 400 civilians killed by U.S. naval artillery on the beaches near the port of Pohang in September 1950.

==== Sinchon Massacre ====
The North Korean government claims that U.S. forces massacred 35,000 people at Sinchon between 17 October and 7 December 1950. South Korean sources estimate a significantly lower death toll and dispute any American involvement. The majority of historians outside of North Korea believe that this massacre was orchestrated by local right-wing (mostly Christian) civilians or related militias, and U.S. intervention was absent or at most peripheral.

==== Geneva Conference of 1954 ====
The armistice at the end of the Korean War required that a political conference be pursued where the question of a unified Korea would be addressed. Despite many proposals for independent national elections and a unified, democratic, independent Korea no declaration for a unified Korea was adopted. Some participants and analysts blame the U.S. for obstructing efforts towards unification.

==== Military prostitution ====
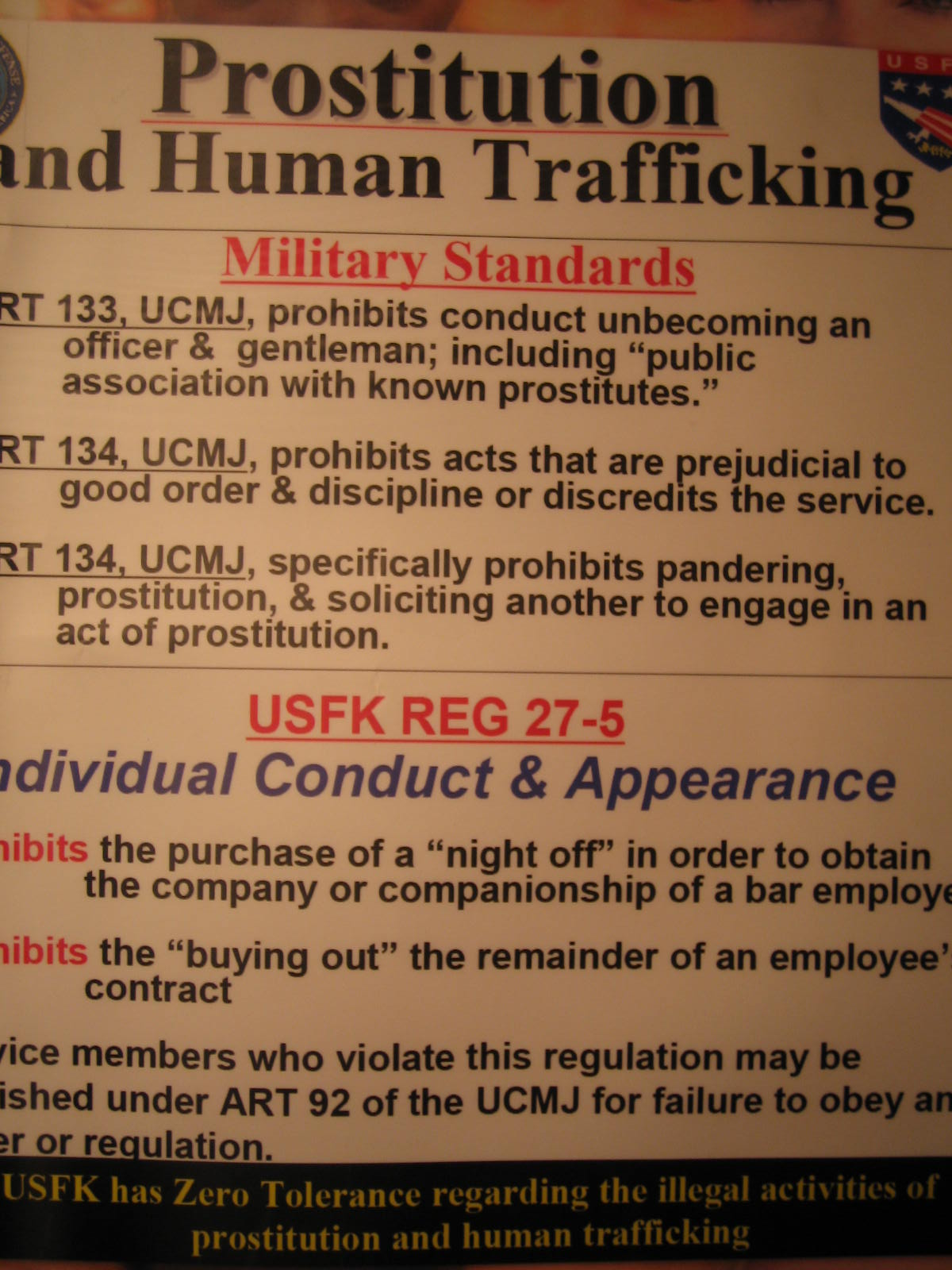
Warning of Prostitution and Human trafficking in South Korea for G.I. by United States Forces Korea.

U.S. military patronage of South Korean prostitutes has been a source of controversy for decades.

During the early 1990s, former victims of forced prostitution became a symbol of Anti-American nationalism. Former military prostitutes are seeking compensation and apologies as they claim to have been the biggest sacrifice for the South Korea-United States alliance. Some South Korean women report being encouraged to provide sexual services for American soldiers. As a result of this practice, some women were killed by soldiers, including Yun Geum-i in 1992. American military police and South Korean officials regularly raided clubs looking for women who were thought to be spreading venereal diseases, locking them up under guard in so-called monkey houses with barred windows. There, the prostitutes were forced to take medications until they were well.

=== American Cultural Center arson ===
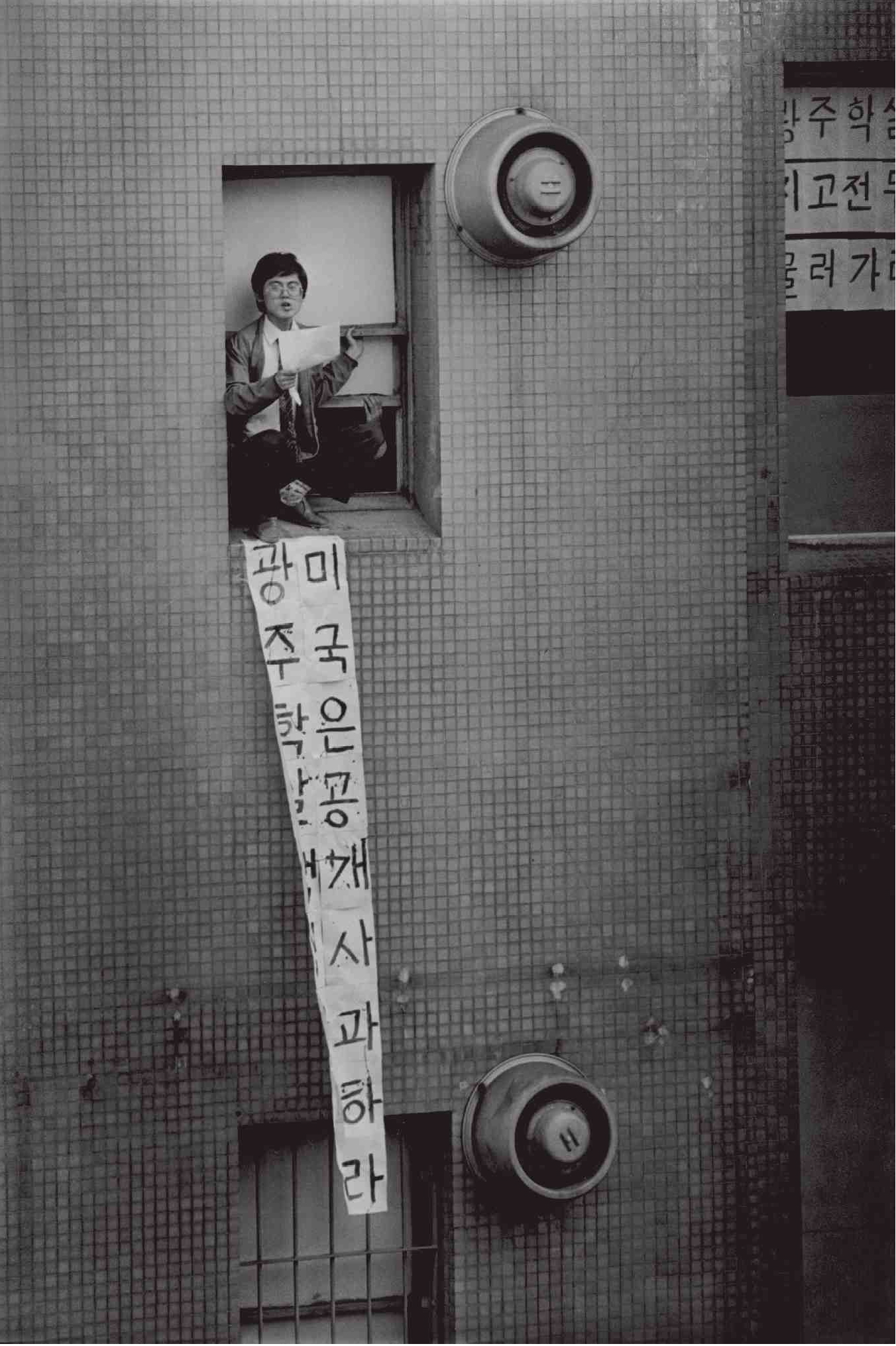
Sit-in protest at the U.S. cultural Center on 23 May 1985

On 9 December 1980, in Gwangju, arsonists protesting the Gwangju massacre, burned the American Cultural Center, blaming the purported American role in Gwangju Uprising.

On 12 March 1982, arsonists set fire to the American Cultural Center in Busan. They killed one and injured several others. Moon Pu-shik and Kim Hyon-jang were sentenced to death but later commuted to life sentences and then to 20 years.

On 20 November 1982, arsonists burned the American Cultural Center in Gwangju for the second time. In September 1983, Daegu's the bombing of Daegu American Cultural Center. In May 1985 in Seoul, American Cultural Center was seized.

On 23 April 2013, in Daegu, two anti-U.S. arsonists mistakenly attacked a cram school called the American Cultural Center.

== 2000s incidents ==
=== Yangju highway incident ===
On 13 June 2002, a U.S. military vehicle fatally injured two 14-year-old South Korean girls, Shin Hyo-sun (신효순) and Shim Mi-seon (심미선), who were walking along a street in Uijeongbu, Gyeonggi Province. The incident provoked anti-American sentiment in South Korea when a U.S military court found the soldiers involved, who were sent back to the United States immediately after the decision, not guilty. This prompted hundreds of thousands of South Koreans to protest against the U.S Army's continued presence.

=== PSY's anti-American performance ===
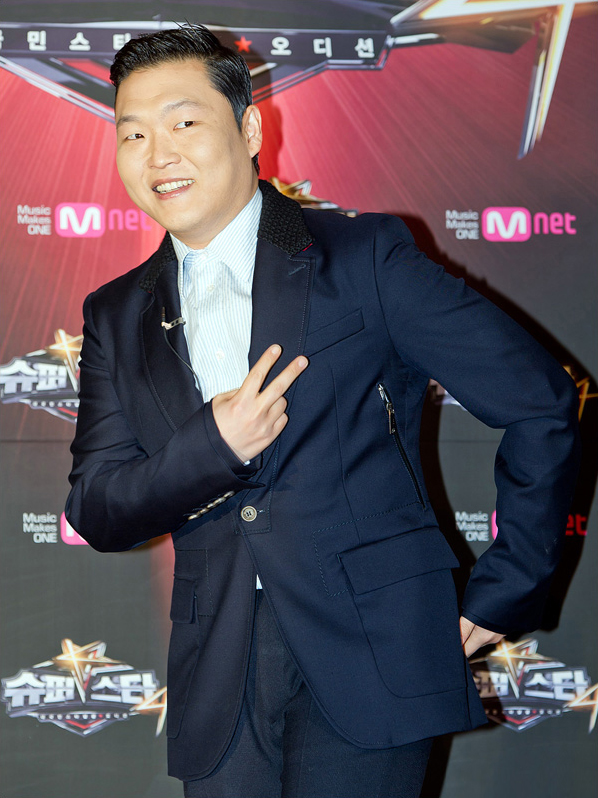
South Korean pop star PSY.

In 2002, PSY and some pop stars participated in an anti-American concert in response to the incident. PSY lifted up a model of a U.S. M2 Bradley armoured vehicle and smashed it, and rapped the song "Dear American". The song was written by a South Korean band to condemn the United States and its military for its role in the Iraq War. The anti-American lyrics saying, "Kill those fucking Yankees who have been torturing Iraqi captives and those who ordered them to torture," and "Kill them all slowly and painfully," as well as "daughters, mothers, daughters-in-law and fathers." In December 2012, he issued an apology to the U.S. Military.

=== Apolo Ohno 2002 Winter Olympics controversy ===
In Salt Lake City, Utah, Apolo Anton Ohno emerged as a popular athlete among U.S. fans for reportedly charming them with his cheerful attitude and laid-back style. He became the face of short track speed skating in the U.S., which was a relatively new and unknown sport at the time, and carried the medal hopes of America in that sport. Ohno medaled in two events, although there was some controversy associated with the results.

In the 1500 m race, Ohno won the gold medal, with a time of 2:18.541. During the 1500 m final race, South Korean Kim Dong-sung was first across the finish line, but was disqualified for blocking Ohno, in what is called cross tracking. Ohno was in second place with three laps remaining, and on his third attempt to pass on the final lap, Kim drifted slightly to the inside where Ohno raised his arms and came out of his crouch to signal that he was blocked. Fourth-place finisher of the same race, Fabio Carta of Italy, showed his disagreement with the decision saying that it was "absurd that the Korean was disqualified." China's Li Jiajun, who moved from bronze to silver, remained neutral saying: "I respect the decision of the referee, I'm not going to say any more." Steven Bradbury of Australia, the 1000 m gold medal winner, also shared his views: "Whether Dong-Sung moved across enough to be called for cross-tracking, I don't know, he obviously moved across a bit. It's the judge's interpretation. A lot of people will say it was right and a lot of people will say it's wrong. I've seen moves like that before that were not called. But I've seen them called too."

==== "Fucking USA" ====
"Fucking USA" is a protest song written by South Korean singer and activist Yoon Min-suk. Strongly anti-US foreign policy and anti-Bush, the song was written in 2002 at a time when, following the Apolo Ohno Olympic controversy and the Yangju highway incident, anti-American sentiment in South Korea reached record high levels.

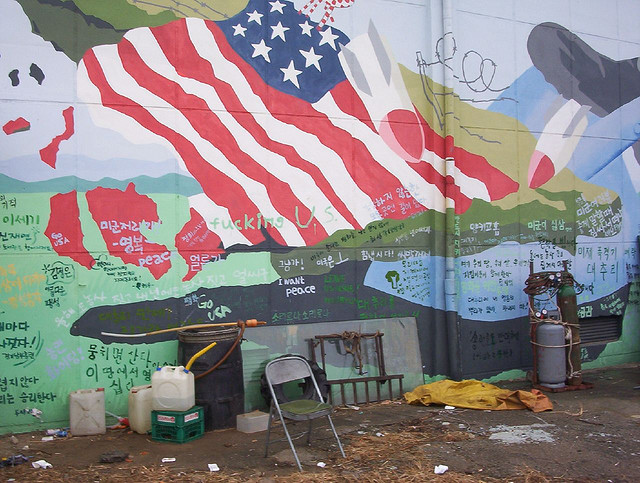
A painting of an anti-American slogan painted on the exterior wall of the Daechu-ri Nonghyup warehouse.

=== The Host ===
The 2006 South Korean monster film The Host has been described as anti-American. The film was in part inspired by an incident in 2000 in which a Korean mortician working for the U.S. military in Seoul dumped a large amount of formaldehyde down the drain. In the film the dumped chemicals engender a horrible mutated monster from the river which menaces the inhabitants of Seoul. The American military situated in South Korea is portrayed as uncaring about the effects their activities have on the locals. The chemical agent used by the American military to combat the monster in the end is named "Agent Yellow" in reference to Agent Orange.

The director, Bong Joon-ho, commented on the issue: "It's a stretch to simplify The Host as an anti-American film, but there is certainly a metaphor and political commentary about the U.S." Because of its themes that can be seen as critical of the United States, the film was actually lauded by North Korean authorities, a rarity for a South Korean blockbuster film.

=== 2008 U.S. beef protest ===
Between 24 May 2008 and about 18 July 2008 in Seoul, mass protests were held in Seoul against the importation of American beef.

== 2010s incidents ==
=== 2015 attack on the USA Ambassador ===
At about 7:40 a.m. on 5 March 2015, Mark Lippert, United States Ambassador to South Korea was attacked by a knife-wielding man at a restaurant attached to Sejong Center in downtown Seoul, where he was scheduled to give a speech at a meeting of the Korean Council for Reconciliation and Cooperation. The assailant, Kim Ki-jong, is a member of Uri Madang (우리마당), a progressive cultural organization opposed to the Korean War. He inflicted wounds on Lippert's left arm as well as a four-inch cut on the right side of the ambassador's face, requiring 80 stitches. Lippert underwent surgery at Yonsei University's Severance Hospital in Seoul. While his injuries were not life-threatening, doctors stated that it would take several months for Lippert to regain use of his fingers. A police official said that the knife used in the attack was 10 inches (25 cm) long and Lippert later reported that the blade penetrated to within 2 cm of his carotid artery. ABC News summarized the immediate aftermath of the attack as follows: "Ambassador Lippert, an Iraq war veteran, defended himself from the attack. Lippert was rushed to a hospital where he was treated for deep cuts to his face, his arm, and his hand. ... [He] kept his cool throughout the incident."

During the attack and while being subdued by security, Kim screamed that the rival Koreas should be unified and told reporters that he had attacked Lippert to protest the annual United States–South Korean joint military exercises. Kim has a record of militant Korean nationalist activism; he attacked the Japanese ambassador to South Korea in 2010 and was sentenced to a three-year suspended prison term. On 11 September 2015, Kim was sentenced to twelve years in prison for the attack.

=== Japan–South Korea Comfort Women Agreement issues ===
On 28 December 2015, the Japan-South Korea Comfort Women Agreement was voted on under a compromise between the two conservative governments of South Korea (Park Geun-hye) and Japan (Shinzo Abe). (Note: Conservatives in South Korea often have weaker or less anti-Japanese sentiment than liberals. They are willing to cooperate with Japan because 'anti-communist' (anti-North Korea government and pro-American) sentiment is stronger than liberals.) Amnesty International and South Korean liberal-to-progressives criticized the deal because it excluded the victim's direct intentions.

All South Korean liberal-to-progressive media believe the negotiations were forced by the United States. The reason is that the United States wants South Korea and Japan to work together to check economically growing China, rather than the human rights and justice of Japanese war crimes Korean-victims who are still alive.

The Japan-South Korea Comfort Women Agreement temporarily increased anti-American sentiment among South Korean liberal-to-progressives. However, a year later, due to the THAAD issue, anti-Chinese sentiment in South Korea surged as China 'retaliated economically' against South Korea, which greatly reduced anti-American sentiment among liberal-to-progressives. The Moon Jae-in government and subsequent South Korean liberals are supporting a foreign policy to turn North Korea into a "pro-U.S. country similar to Vietnam" to keep both China and Japan in check. (Note: Most South Koreans, including liberal-to-progressives, traditionally tend to be more wary of Chinese and Japanese than the Americans. Anti-American sentiment among South Korean liberal-to-progressives comes mostly from the United States' disregard for South Korea's anti-Japanese sentiment and historical justice against Japan.)

=== General Security of Military Information Agreement (GSOMIA) issues ===
As part of the 2019 Japan–South Korea trade dispute, the Moon Jae-in government attempted to end GSOMIA, a 2016 Japan–South Korea military exchange agreement signed under the facilitation of the United States. This provoked negative reactions from American analysts and politicians, who claimed that the decision would worsen North Korean security threats. Eventually, GSOMIA was maintained. Some left-leaning South Koreans, including the Korean Confederation of Trade Unions, have described the U.S. as a violation of South Korean sovereignty and the deliberate ignoring of Japan's former colonization of Korea.

== Recent trends ==
Anti-American sentiment in South Korea is generally associated with the liberal or progressive movement, rather than the conservative. However, anti-Chinese sentiment has increased significantly in South Korea regardless of political orientation since the 2010s, which led to a significant decrease in anti-American sentiment among South Korean liberals.

While protests have arisen over specific incidents, they may be reflective of deeper historical, anti-Western sentiment. Robert Hathaway, director of the Wilson Center's Asia program, suggests: "the growth of anti-American sentiment in both Japan and South Korea must be seen not simply as a response to American policies and actions, but as reflective of deeper domestic trends and developments within these Asian countries." Speaking to the Wilson Center, Katharine Moon notes that while the majority of South Koreans support the American alliance "anti-Americanism also represents the collective venting of accumulated grievances that in many instances have lain hidden for decades."

Within the last decade until 2018, many Korean dramas and films have portrayed Americans in a negative light, which may also contribute to the harboring of anti-American views among South Koreans.

In the 2020s, political anti-Americanism in South Korea is mainly seen by 'some' socialists and anti-U.S. nationalists, while liberals and conservatives may be at odds with the United States in part, but basically support political pro-Americanism. Socialists and anti-U.S. nationalists in South Korea have never formed a mainstream political force. (Note: Pro-Americanism of liberals and conservatives have completely different purposes. Liberals pro-Americanism tends to establish friendly relations with the United States to protect South Korea from Chinese/Japanese imperialism. At the same time, they have considerable sympathy for North Korea, which shares its identity as basically the same South Korean, and seek from the U.S. to ease sanctions on the North Korea and acquiesce or support for its Sunshine policy. This leaves liberals critical of China but friendly to Russia. In contrast, Conservatives' pro-Americanism is hostile to North Korea because it is based on anti-communist sentiment.)

The election of Donald Trump as president has led to a deterioration of opinions about the United States in South Korea. According to a Pew Research poll in 2025, 61% of South Koreans held a favorable opinion of the United States, down from 77% in 2024, while 39% held an unfavorable opinion, up from 19% in 2024. According to a KStatResearch poll in October 2025, 56% of South Koreans had favorable opinions of the United States, while 40% had a negative opinion; most commonly cited reasons for negative opinions were Trump administration's erratic policies (46%), economic burden imposed by the U.S. (26%), and the America First policy (20%). Additionally, only 27% of respondents said that "some national interests should be sacrificed" for the sake of the alliance with the United States, while 68% responded that "national interests should be the top priority".

In 2024-2025, public protests occurred against the presence of U.S. military forces. Protesters also demanded the withdrawal of U.S. troops from other regions, including Iraq.

=== Indigenous nuclear weapon issues ===
Since the 2020s, anti-American sentiment has emerged among supporters of indigenous nuclear weapons in the South Korea, mostly right-wing nationalist-conservatives. Anti-American sentiment among some conservatives in the South comes because the U.S. believes it cannot protect the South Korea from North Korean nuclear weapons. However, conservatives should be distinguished from the anti-American sentiment of 'far-left (NL) nationalists' because they have a stronger anti-communist and anti-North sentiment and are also pro-American in that they strongly oppose the withdrawal of U.S. troops. These new types of right-wing nationalists often cite de Gaulle's foreign policy as an exemplary model.

== See also ==
- Anti-Americanism
- Anti-sadaejuui
- Anti-Korean sentiment in the United States
- Axis of evil
- Busan American Cultural Service building arson
- Demonstrations at Yongsan Garrison
- Sinchon Museum of American War Atrocities
- United States–North Korea relations
- Racism in South Korea
- Racism in North Korea
