= Misun-Hyosun vigil =

2002 vigils in South Korea

The Misun-Hyosun vigil was the very first candlelight vigil held in South Korea to commemorate and protest the death of two middle school students who were killed by a U.S. military vehicle in the Yangju highway incident.

== Background ==
=== Yangju highway incident ===
On June 13, 2002, two 14-year-old girls, Shin Hyo-sun and Shim Mi-seon, were killed by a U.S. military vehicle on the Yangju Highway 56, in an accident known as the Yangju highway incident. American soldiers were training with an armored vehicle launched bridge on the highway, where they hit the two girls, causing their immediate deaths.

South Korea and the U.S. have the Status of the Forces Agreement (SOFA), meaning that the U.S. had jurisdiction over the incident. The drivers of the military vehicle were pronounced innocent in 2002 under the U.S. military tribunal. This angered South Koreans and incited the candlelight vigils.

=== Controversy ===
The major controversial issue in this incident was whether the vehicle driver saw the girls or not. The 2nd Infantry Division of the United States Army emphasized that the incident was "the tragic incident which was never intentional or malicious." The U.S. military authority said that the structure of the vehicle caused a blind spot on its right side, and that the controller saw the girls and tried to inform the driver. Moreover, due to the communication disruption, the driver did not hear the radio and hit the two girls. The 2nd Infantry Division also reported that the vehicle was driving straight — not driving over the centerline — at a speed of 8 to 16 km per hour, and another armored vehicle, facing the opposite direction, stopped at a point 1m away from the accident vehicle.

Some questions arose after this announcement, such as that visibility may depend on the direction of the driver's head, as well as disputes over the alleged communication problems. In the case of an orbital vehicle, if driven at a speed of 8 to 16 km, it would stop immediately when the braking system was applied. This caused South Koreans to ask how the vehicle could injure the victim to the point of crushing, and why marks appeared on the road that seemed like they were caused by a sudden swerve.

=== Public reaction ===
On June 26, 2002, many groups protested in front of the U.S. 2nd Infantry Division base. Some protestors cut the wire fence. Furthermore, two reporters who went inside the station were locked up and assaulted by the U.S. soldiers. There was a lot of criticism toward the U.S. military in South Korea. The U.S. military chief of public affairs was interviewed on the radio and stated that it was the Korean police who arrested the reporters. He also said that no one was responsible for the incident. This incited further anger in the South Korean citizens.

== Candlelight vigils ==
=== First stage ===
The first stage of the protest happened from after the incident until November 30, 2002. The protests usually occurred in front of the U.S. military base or the U.S. embassy. Often, direct physical forms of protest were prevalent, such as attempts to enter the U.S. military base. People tried to publicize the incidents using online space more than regular broadcasting channels. The revision of the Status of the Forces Agreement (SOFA) was brought up, not only to the public, but also to politicians.

=== Second stage ===
The second stage started on November 30. Online, an anonymous person using the nickname "Angama" suggested that the public gather and protest in Gwanghwamun and in front of the City Hall. At 6 p.m. on November 30, more than ten thousand people gathered with candles. After that, every weekend in downtown Seoul, people gathered and had a candlelight protest. Parents brought their children of all ages to the candlelight vigils for peaceful demonstrations. Middle school students and high school students voluntarily participated. People spoke and sang the national anthem, as well as protest songs. Music and dance performances by the protesters contrasted with previous mass protests, which usually involved fights against the police.

==== Impact of the social media ====
The second stage of the candlelight vigils was the very first case of online collective action in the offline candlelight vigils. The public emotions of anger emerges, and participation through the Internet community rapidly spread after the trial of the military vehicle driver, bringing more participants to the candlelight vigils.

=== Third stage ===
The third stage started at the end of December 2002 through April 2003. This stage had a different aspect from the former two stages. Earlier in the year, nuclear threats from North Korea caused debates over the war crisis on the Korean Peninsula. Also, the U.S. government was preparing the Iraq war. Bush administration asked the South Korean government to send troops.

The third stage developed as an anti-war peace movement, not only to commemorate the girls who were killed, but to also draw attention to anti-nuclear and anti-war sentiments that the protesters had. The focus of the protest had been changed to opposition to the dispatch of troops to Iraq. After April 2003, the popularity of the candlelight vigils decreased.

== Aftermath ==
=== Anti-American Movement ===
The incident contributed to Anti-American sentiments. On December 14, 2002, during the candlelight vigils, protesters tore the American flag in front of the City Hall. As a result, candlelight vigils became connected to the anti-American argument. Activist groups tried to hide their Anti-Americanist sentiments while protesting for the revision of the Status of the Forces Agreement (SOFA) and the anti-war movement.

In the entertainment industry, the anti-American movement was happening. Psy and Shin Hae-chul did a performance that smashed a model armored vehicle. Psy also had a silent prayer for Hyosun and Misun. Also, KBS announcer Hwang Jung-min, who said, "I feel ashamed" during a news broadcast of anti-American protests, resigned as an announcer for KBS 2TV <News8> due to criticism from viewers.

=== Korean Government ===
The South Korean government provoked public outrage while dealing with the incident. The justice minister held a separate press conference, saying it is difficult to revise the SOFA.

=== The U.S. Government ===
On September 21, 2002, the U.S. authorities set up a memorial near the site of the accident and also paid 200 million won worth of compensation to the bereaved families.

President George W. Bush sent a message through the U.S. ambassador to South Korea, saying that it was a 'regret' at a time when the U.S. military's vehicle in Korea caused two middle school girls to be crushed to death, 5 months after the incident happened. Nothing changed with the Status of the Forces Agreement (SOFA).

== See also ==
- South Korea-United States relations
- Status of forces agreement
- 2008 US beef protest in South Korea
- 2016–17 South Korean protests
