= Consulate General of the United States, Busan =

Consulate of the United States, Busan
- Location: Busan, South Korea
- Address: Lotte Goldrose 612, 993 Central Street, Busanjin District, Busan, South Korea (Yangjeong-dong 231-2, Postal code: 47209)
- Coordinates: 35.178030°N 129.074649°E
- Opened: January 27, 1984 (Original opening), October 19, 2007 (Reopening)
- Closed: July 10, 1998
- Jurisdiction: Busan, Daegu, Ulsan, South Gyeongsang Province, North Gyeongsang Province, Jeju Special Self-Governing Province
- Consul General: Gordon Church
- Website: https://kr.usembassy.gov/ko/embassy-consulate-ko/busan-ko

The U.S. Consulate in Busan (Korean: 주부산 미국 영사관) is the consulate established by the United States in Busan, South Korea.

== History ==
On January 19, 1982, The U.S. Embassy in Korea opened its Economic Section Busan Office inside the U.S. Cultural Center in Jung District, Busan. The South Korean Ministry of Foreign Affairs protested that this action was taken without prior approval of the South Korean government under the Vienna Convention on Diplomatic Relations. The U.S. Embassy formally opened the Economic Section Busan Office on March 3, 1982, after going through the approval process of the South Korean Ministry of Foreign Affairs. On October 12, 1982, the U.S. Embassy requested to upgrade the Busan Office to consulate level with jurisdiction over consular, political, and economic affairs. However, the South Korean government declined, arguing that the U.S. government's request was not equitable compared to other countries.

On November 13, 1983, Ronald Reagan announced his intention to establish a consulate in Busan, South Korea, during a summit meeting with Chun Doo-hwan, the President of South Korea. Subsequently, the U.S. government initiated the procedure to establish a consulate in Busan without the approval of the South Korean government. On January 27, 1984, the U.S. government opened the consulate on the second floor of the U.S. Cultural Center, and took charge of consular duties and issuing visas. However, on April 1, 1994, the U.S. federal government discontinued visa issuance as part of budget cuts.

The U.S. government closed the U.S. Cultural Center in Busan, which had been in operation since 1949, on October 1, 1996, and also closed the U.S. Consulate in Busan on July 10, 1998. On April 30, 1999, the U.S. government returned the sites of the U.S. Consulate and the U.S. Cultural Center in Busan to the South Korean government. After the closure of the U.S. Consulate in Busan, it was absorbed into the consular section of the U.S. Embassy in Korea and, similar to the Korean Intellectual Property Office, its jurisdiction was changed to cover the entire area of South Korea. In 2003, the Busan Modern History Museum was opened on the site where the U.S. Cultural Center and the U.S. Consulate in Busan were once located. On October 19, 2007, a consular office handling limited consular tasks was established. However, following changes in U.S. foreign policy, this branch office and consular office were upgraded to a general consulate, a status that remains to this day.

== Jurisdiction ==
The area of jurisdiction includes Dokdo, which is effectively governed by North Gyeongsang Province. There are plans to separately transfer consular jurisdiction to Gwangju, South Jeolla Province in the future.

- Busan
- Daegu
- Ulsan
- South Gyeongsang Province
- North Gyeongsang Province
- Jeju Special Self-Governing Province

== See also ==
- Embassy of the United States in Seoul
- Korea–United States relations
