= Fucking USA =

Single by Yoon Min-suk
- Released: 2002
- Genre: Rock & Roll; Punk; Parody
- Songwriter: Yoon Min-suk
- Producers: Yoon Min-suk "Park"

"Fucking USA", often called "Fuck'n USA", is an anti-American protest song written by South Korean singer and activist Yoon Min-suk. Strongly anti-US Foreign policy and anti-Bush, the song was written in 2002 at a time when, following the Apolo Ohno Olympic controversy and an incident in which two Korean middle school students were killed by a U.S. Army vehicle, anti-American sentiment in Korea reached high levels.

In 2012, the US band Neung Phak covered the song on their album Neung Phak 2.

== Video ==
Later, a music video was broadcast on a South Korean news program, where it was picked up by Rob Pongi and subsequently rebroadcast on the show's website along with Japanese and English subtitles, enabling it to spread worldwide. The version of the song in the video has been remixed and opens with caricatures of U.S. President George W. Bush taunting Koreans, while chants of "부시악" ("Bushi Ak" or "Bush Evil") echo in the background. It displays a slideshow of Korean political cartoons attacking U.S. foreign policy, ending abruptly on the line "Yankee Go Home!", with an animation of the Statue of Liberty exploding.

The video has developed a minor cult status in the West, where it has been shown on comedy shows such as Tarrant on TV and Web Junk 20.

== See also ==
- Anti-American sentiment in Korea
- Highway 56 Accident
- Mosh (song)
