= Oriental Development Company =

1908–1945 Japanese company in Korea

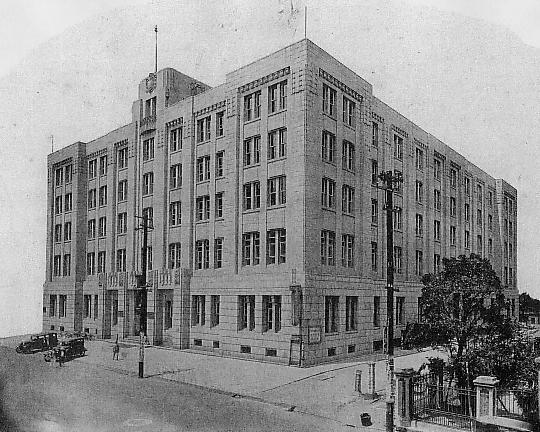

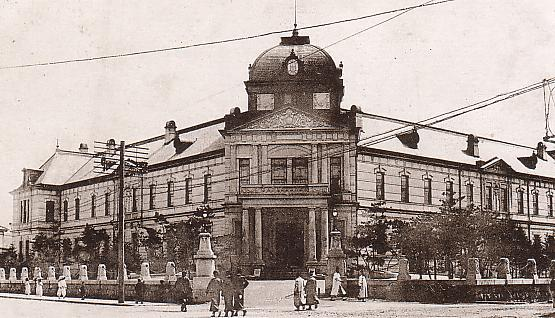
- Oriental Development Company building in Seoul, before demolition
- Type: Private
- Industry: International trade
- Founded: 1908
- Founder: Empire of Japan
- Defunct: 1945
- Headquarters: Keijō and Tokyo, Empire of Japan
- Owner: Governor-General of Japanese Korea (40%)

The Oriental Development Company (Japanese: 東洋拓殖株式會社; Korean: 동양척식주식회사) was a colonial company established by the Empire of Japan in 1908. The company was headquartered first in Seoul, and later in Tokyo.

== Foundation ==
In 1905, the Empire of Japan made a treaty with the Korean Empire called the Japan–Korea Treaty of 1905. As a result, the Korean Empire became a protectorate of the Empire of Japan. This treaty deprived Korea of its national sovereignty.

The treaty also allowed the Empire of Japan to build the Japanese Government-General Building in Seoul and appoint a resident-general.

The treaty of 1905 led to the foundation of the Japan-Korea Treaty of 1907. In March 1908, the National Diet of Japan passed the bill establishing the Oriental Development Company that the government of Korea was forced to sign. It was initially managed by both the Korean Empire and the Empire of Japan. When the headquarters were moved to Tokyo in 1917, it became wholly owned by the Empire of Japan.

In 1927 Na Seok-ju, a Korean independence movement activist, bombed the building in Seoul, which resulted in the death of some of the managers. Despite this incident, the company started to create branches in other Japanese-controlled areas overseas, such as Taiwan, Manchuria, Sakhalin, and the South Seas Mandate. In 1938 there were nine branches with over 800 employees.

== History ==
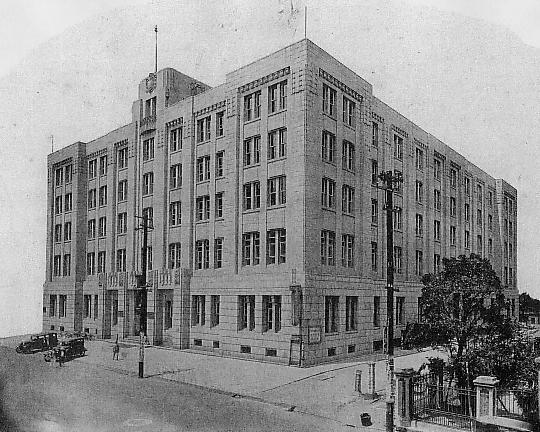
Oriental Development Company building in Tokyo, before demolition

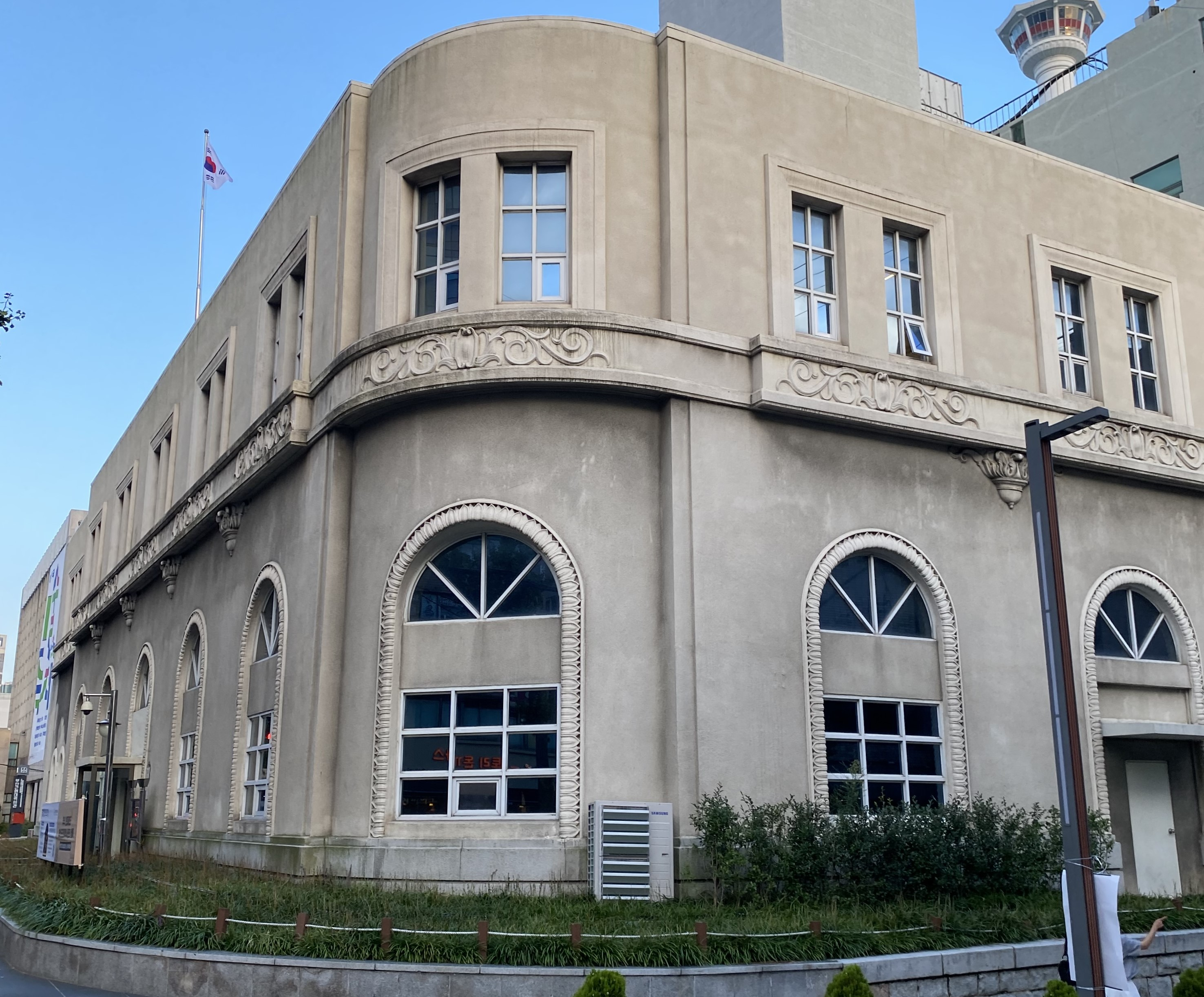
Former Oriental Development Company in Busan, lately annex of the Busan Modern History Museum

=== Migration ===
Due to a decrease in arable land in Japan, Imperial Japan decided to establish migration policies that would help people move to the Korean peninsula to farm. It has been estimated that 85,000 Japanese people had migrated there in 1904, and about 500,000 by 1908.

Company land had been given to Japanese colonists up to the spring of 1924, amounting to more than 8,000 landmass and normal immigrants reached 246,767, thus put together, forming one-seventh of the whole arable land attained by Japanese migrants.

Along with other government support for migration, the practice of "subleasing" was adopted. Japanese people who moved to Joseon were allowed to initiate tenant farming subleasing to Joseon people who lived there originally.

=== Land investment ===
After Imperial Japan carried out a Cadastral Survey, by the late 1920s the company had bought one third of the arable land in the Korean Peninsula. They forced tenants to pay over 50% of their production as rent, while the holdings of Japanese migrants rose by 300% to 400% per year across the Korean Peninsula.

The large amounts of land held by Japanese migrants accrued taxes for the authorities, while Korean farmers lost their independence.

According to Arthur C. Bunce, land tenure was the most common approach for farmers, since there was no other employment. 75% of Korean farmers became tenants.

Life in Hwanghae Province (in current-day North Korea) was described thus:

Owing to a bad harvest, caused by the flood, drought, and attacks by insects, poor and wretched tenants have been pleading for over a month that they must have exemption from paying their rents, or that the rents must be reduced, for the year. . . regardless of how old they are, most of residents came to the local office of the Oriental Company and pleaded for the cancellation of taxes. The local agents of the company threatened, however, that the farmers would lose their tenancy rights if they did not pay their rents.

=== Other investments ===
After the Mukden Incident in 1931, Imperial Japan started to transform the Korean Peninsula into a supply base. Soon, the company invested in electricity and railroad to exploit mines.

== Aftermath ==
After Korea was liberated by the Allies, the United States Army Military Government in Korea confiscated all company property. Soon, this became Shinhan Gongsa, operating in six major cities of South Korea. It later owned and controlled the land of Oriental Development Company.

After the First Republic of Korea was established, the lands that belonged to Oriental Development Company were distributed to farmers by the 1949 Land Reform.

Oriental Development Company buildings still exist in Busan and Mokpo. Two buildings have been converted into museums to document incidents when Korea was under Japanese rule. The land of the building in Seoul is now occupied by the Korea Exchange Bank.

== See also ==
- Japan-Korea Treaty of 1905
- Japan-Korea Treaty of 1907
- Korea under Japanese rule
- Chôsen Industrial Bank
- List of territories occupied by Imperial Japan
