= Pusan American Cultural Service building arson =

1982 attack in South Korea

Coordinates: 35°06′10″N 129°01′52″E

- Location: Pusan, South Korea
- Date: March 1982
- Deaths: 1
- Motive: Anti-Americanism; Revenge for US support of dictatorship

The 1982 Pusan arson attack or Pusan American Council Fire Accidents (부산 미국문화원 방화사건; 釜山美國文化院放火事件) was an anti-American attack against the United States Information Service building in Pusan on 18 March 1982. The attack resulted in the death of a Dong-a University student who was studying in the building; three others were injured.

== Aftermath ==
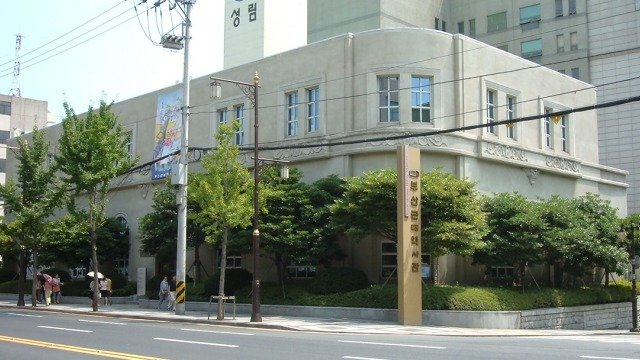
The building in 2007

In June 1982, 16 people were put on trial in Busan for involvement in the attack. Theology student Moon Pu-shik (23) admitted the arson charge, saying the fire was a protest against US support for the Chun Doo-hwan dictatorship, particularly the suppression of the Gwangju Uprising. The other defendants included journalist Kim Hyong-jang (32) and Reverend Choi Ki-shik (39) head of the Catholic education center in Wonju, who was accused of sheltering the attackers. In August 1982 Kim Hyong-jang and Moon Pu-shik were sentenced to death for the arson, while Moon's wife Kim Un-suk (24) and Lee Mi-ok (21), were sentenced to life imprisonment. Following pleas for mercy from the US and protests by Catholic and Protestant groups, Kim and Moon's death sentences were commuted to life imprisonment in March 1983. Their sentences were reduced to 20 years in 1988. Moon Pu-shik was released from prison in 1988 after having served six years and nine months in prison.

The former USIS building now houses the Busan Modern History Museum.
