= Steven A. Boylan =

American military spokesman

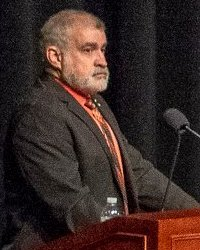
Steve Boylan in 2018

Steven Arthur Boylan (born September 30, 1965), formerly a U.S. military spokesman in Baghdad for General David Petraeus in the prosecution of the Iraq War troop surge of 2007 from February, 2007 to September, 2008. After leaving Iraq, he became the public affairs officer and the senior public affairs observer/trainer for the Battle Command Training Program (BCTP) at Fort Leavenworth, Kansas, according to U.S. News & World Report.

== Personal life ==
Boylan is the son of Louis and Barbara Boylan.

== Career ==
=== 2002 stabbing ===
Boylan was attacked on the night of December 15, 2002 outside Seoul, South Korea's Yongsan Garrison, the headquarters of the United States Forces Korea. According to his statement to police, he was attacked by three Korean men in their twenties, who cursed at him in English, pushed him from behind, and stabbed him with a 5-inch blade. He received a cut on his left side, below the ribcage, for which he was treated at a base hospital; he did not require stitches. Boylan had come to public attention in South Korea for his role as the army spokesman regarding the June 13, 2002 roadside accident in which a U.S. Army armored vehicle struck and killed two South Korean girls.

=== Greenwald emails ===
In late October 2007, Boylan became embroiled in a dispute with Glenn Greenwald of Salon Magazine over articles by Greenwald related to the prosecution of the Iraq War by the George W. Bush presidency and a series of emails. Boylan has stated that he did not send the email in question, claiming that it was sent by an imposter. Prior to the incident, evidence had surfaced of Boylan being impersonated via email.
