= 1962 Szczecin military parade accident =

Coordinates: 53°25′55″N 14°32′20″E

The 1962 Szczecin military parade of 9 October 1962 led to a road traffic accident in which a tank of the Polish People's Army crushed bystanders, killing seven children and injuring many more. The resultant panic in the crowd led to further injuries in the rush to escape. The incident was covered up for many years by the Polish communist authorities.

== Background of the parade ==
In late 1962, due to the growing Cuban Missile Crisis, the Eastern Bloc and the Western Bloc stood on the brink of war. Under Soviet pressure, the Polish authorities organized substantial military exercises in northwest Poland, in the area of Szczecin. The exercises were observed by Marshal of the Soviet Union Andrei Grechko as well as several Polish officials, including Władysław Gomułka and Marian Spychalski. The parade in Szczecin was to be the finale of the maneuvers.

== Parade ==
On 9 October 1962, the main streets in the center of Szczecin were closed to traffic. Inhabitants of the city crowded the sidewalks, curious to see the tanks and equipment of the three allied armies: the Polish People's Army, the Soviet Army, and the National People's Army (NVA). Thousands of people, including children, gathered along Szczecin’s main arteries of Aleja Wojska Polskiego, Aleja Piastów, and Aleja Kościuszki. The event had been widely promoted, and schoolchildren were told to describe the parade as their homework. Students of all schools were allowed to go home early to spectate. Many children stood on the curbs as close to the tanks and other weapons as possible.

City authorities adorned streets with flags of Poland, the Soviet Union, and East Germany; in schools, flowers had been given to children, who were told to wave them at soldiers. Newspapers headlines told readers that they would witness "A parade of our might", "A symbol of brotherhood in arms that serves the peace", and that "Polish Szczecin welcomes allied forces".

The Warsaw Pact planners saw the parade as a show of the strength of its forces. It had been very carefully prepared, and Marshal Grechko wanted to present some of the best and most advanced weapons the Pact possessed in 1962. Thus, spectators had a chance to see cannons, mortars, armored personnel carriers, howitzers, and tanks. Above the city, a few heavy Mi-6 helicopters flew, and warships of the Soviet Navy lay moored in the port.

First, tanks and weapons of the NVA appeared, followed by Soviet tanks, and finally, Polish units. Among them were 14 tanks of the 5th Armored Division from Slubice. Crowds of adults and children alike came closer and closer to the vehicles, not listening to the militsiya, who were telling them to move back.

== The tragedy ==
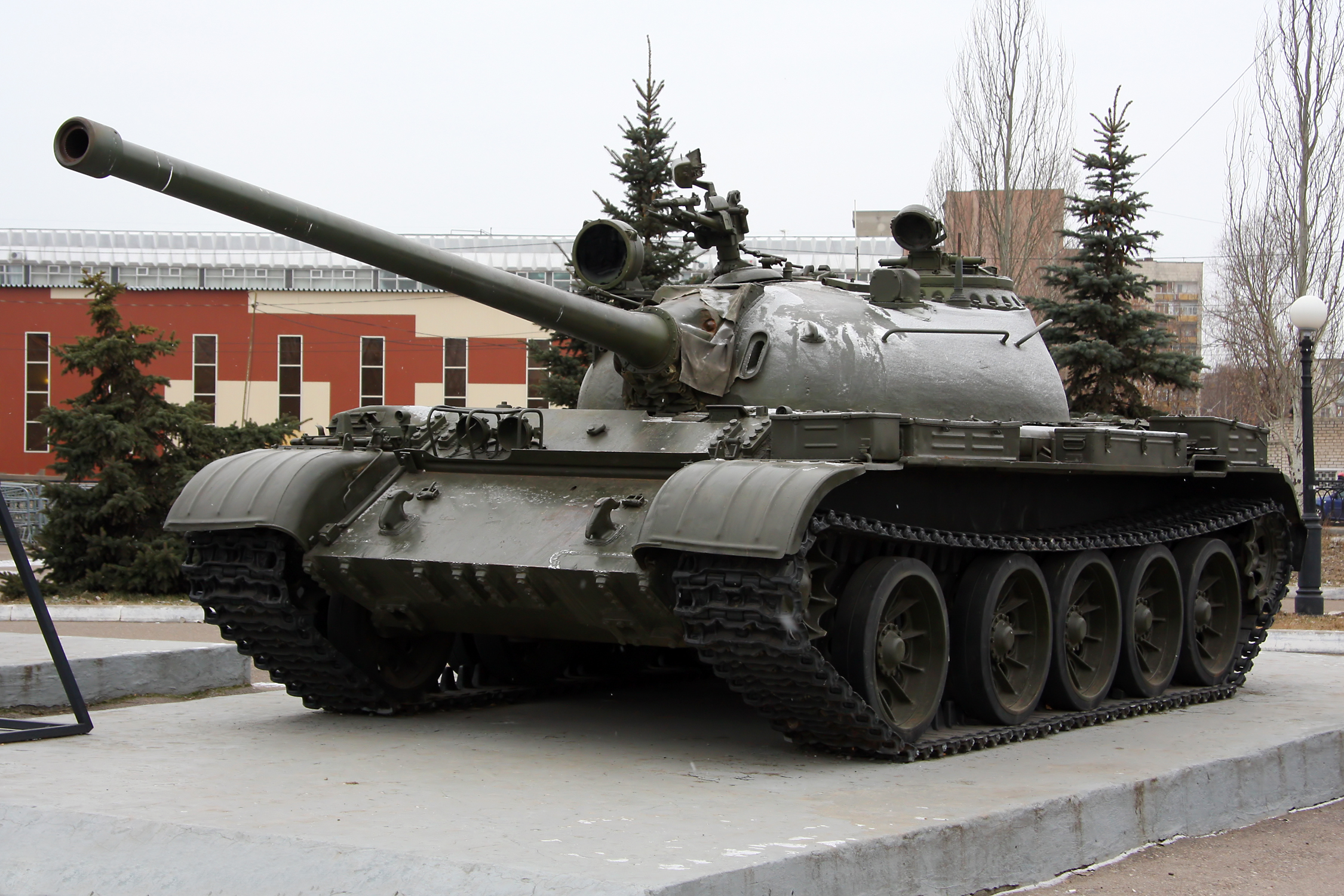
A T-54 tank (displayed at Victory Park), similar to that used in the incident.

It is not known why a T-54 tank (marked with number 0165) of the Polish Army ran into a group of children standing either on the sidewalk by Aleja Piastow Street or on the street itself (sources vary on this matter). All documents describing this incident were destroyed in March 1982, and all information about the tragedy was suppressed. It is possible that the tank, which was the last one in line, drove too fast or skidded on the slippery road. The tank, weighing 36 tons, was traveling at a speed of some 30 km/h.

Altogether, seven children died. Four of them were students of Szczecin’s Elementary Number 1; in 2006, a tablet commemorating the tragedy was placed at the entrance to the school. The children who died were aged from 6 to 12 years. Also, an additional 21 persons, including several more children, were injured, some of them permanently. After the incident, panic broke out in the crowd, as a result of which 22 persons were injured.

== Aftermath ==
The communist authorities expunged any information about the event, but it was not reported in the Polish mass media. A local daily Glos Szczecinski placed a small notice on 10 October stating that seven children died during a parade. Families of the dead children were told not to discuss the topic with anyone.

The military prosecutor's office later called hundreds of witnesses. All were told that the incident was classified and that revealing it would mean imprisonment. At the same time, the trial of the tank’s crew was dismissed, as, according to the military court, the tank had not crossed the curb. All hospital documents connected with the event were confiscated by the military, never to be returned. However, it was impossible to completely suppress news of the event, as too many people had witnessed it. By mid-October 1962, rumors of a high death toll were rife in Szczecin.

== See also ==
- Yangju highway incident

== Sources ==
- Polska.pl
- East News
- Gazeta.pl
