= Mutual Defense Treaty (United States–South Korea) =

1953 defense pact

Mutual Defense Treaty between the United States and the Republic of Korea 대한민국과 미합중국간의 상호방위조약
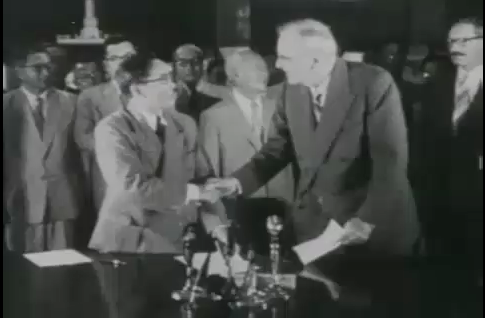
- On August 8, 1953, Foreign Minister Pyone Young-tae and US Secretary of State John Foster Dulles shared a handshake after signing the treaty. Watched by President Syngman Rhee.
- Type: Military alliance
- Signed: October 1, 1953
- Location: Washington D.C.
- Effective: November 18, 1954
- Parties: South Korea; United States
- Language: English, Korean

The Mutual Defense Treaty between the United States and the Republic of Korea (Korean: 대한민국과 미합중국간의 상호방위조약) is a treaty between South Korea and the United States signed on October 1, 1953, two months after the signing of the Korean Armistice Agreement which brought a halt to the fighting in the Korean War. The agreement commits the two countries to provide mutual aid if either faces external armed attack and allows the United States to station military forces in South Korea in consultation with the South Korean government.

== Provisions of the treaty ==
Article I Sets forth that diplomacy instead of force should be utilized in resolving conflicts between the two nations.	"The Parties undertake to settle any international disputes in which they may be involved by peaceful means in such a manner that international peace and security and justice are not endangered and to refrain in their international relations from the threat or use of force in any manner inconsistent with the Purposes of the United Nations, or obligations assumed by any Party toward the United Nations."
Article II Creates an agreement that both the United States and South Korea reserve the right to counsel with one another in the event that one party feels threatened by an outside force. This article also sets forth that both countries are obligated to develop their methods of deterrence via cooperation and also independently.	"The Parties will consult together whenever, in the opinion of either of them, the political independence or security of either of the Parties is threatened by external armed attack. Separately and jointly, by self help and mutual aid, the Parties will maintain and develop appropriate means to deter armed attack and will take suitable measures in consultation and agreement to implement this Treaty and to further its purposes."
Article III Supports Article II and specifies attacks within the Pacific area. It also allows for the further expansion of a country to bring another country under its "administrative control." The United States clarifies that only in the event of an outside force attacking land lawfully obtained by South Korea, will it come to assist them.	"Each Party recognizes that an armed attack in the Pacific area on either of the Parties in territories now under their respective administrative control, or hereafter recognized by one of the Parties as lawfully brought under the administrative control of the other, would be dangerous to its own peace and safety and declares that it would act to meet the common danger in accordance with its constitutional processes."
Article IV Allows for the placement of American troops and military resources (land, air, and sea) in South Korea.	"The Republic of Korea grants, and the United States of America accepts, the right to dispose United States land, air and sea forces in and about the territory of the Republic of Korea as determined by mutual agreement."
Article V This article is set to explain that the treaty is constitutional by both the American and Korean standards, and that it would be ratified in Washington.	"This Treaty shall be ratified by the United States of America and the Republic of Korea in accordance with their respective constitutional processes and will come into force when instruments of ratification thereof have been exchanged by them at Washington."
Article VI It states that while the treaty will always be in place, either country can end it after giving advanced notice to the other party.	"This Treaty shall remain in force indefinitely. Either Party may terminate it one year after notice has been given to the other Party. IN WITNESS WHEREOF the undersigned Plenipotentiaries have signed this Treaty. DONE in duplicate at Washington, in the English and Korean languages, this first day of October 1953."

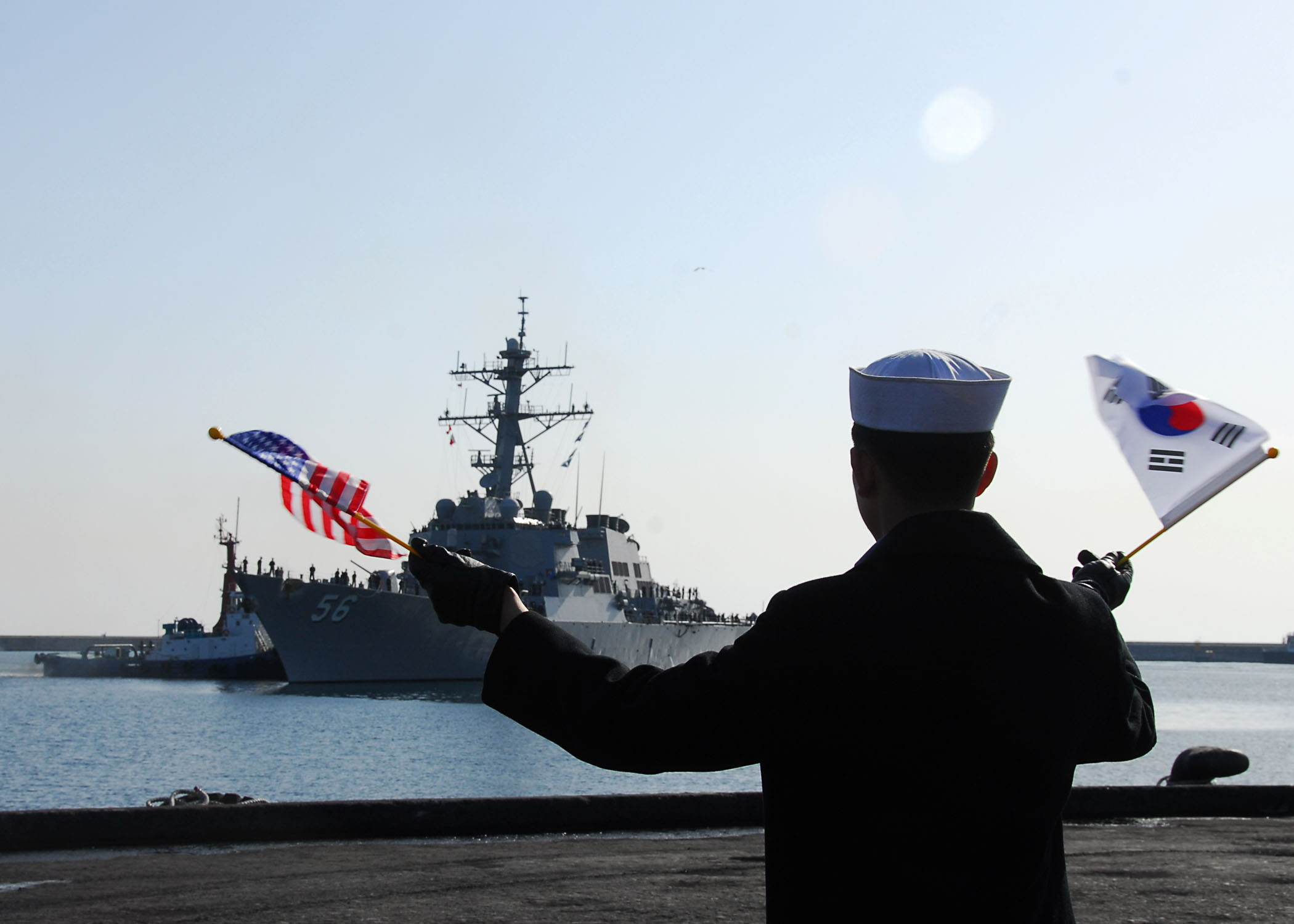
South Korean soldier welcomes American vessel to port.

== US - ROK relationships prior to the Mutual Defense Treaty ==
The first treaty ever established between the United States and Korea occurred in 1882 with the Treaty of Peace, Amity, Commerce, and Navigation. This treaty was between the US and the Joseon Dynasty and a year later in 1883 the first American diplomat traveled to Korea and created a more permanent alliance which lasted until the Japanese colonialization in 1910. In the aftermath of the defeat of the Axis after the World War II, Korea was separated into two different sections and each of these halves was supported by one of the two major powers of the world. South Korea was created and was backed by the United States, while North Korea was founded and supported by the Soviet Union. It was during this time in 1949 that the US once again forged a bond with Korea, and in 1950 North Korea invaded South Korea and began the Korean War.

== Effects of the treaty ==
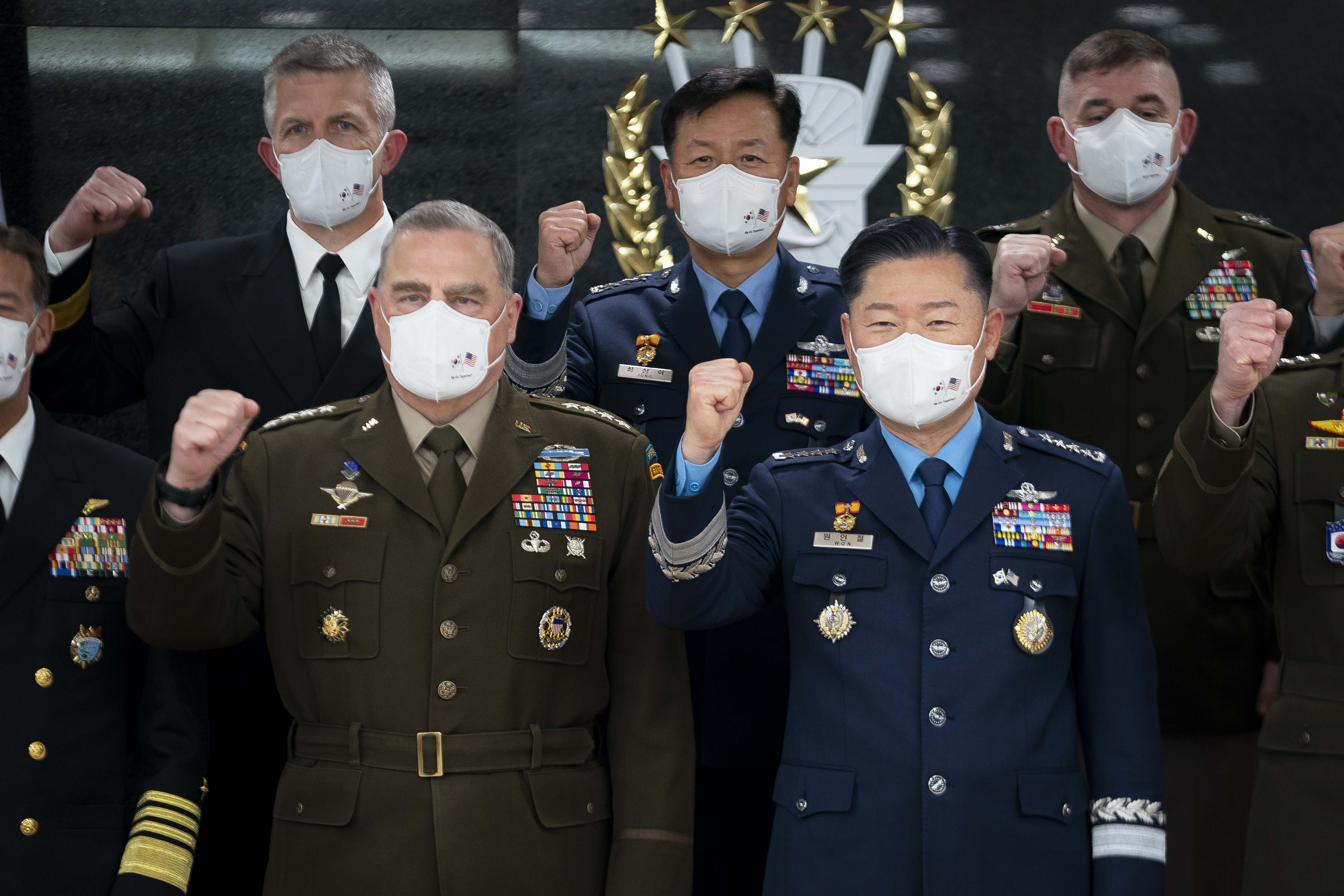
US Chairman of the Joint Chiefs of Staff General Mark Milley with South Korean Chairman of the Joint Chiefs of Staff General Won In-choul in 2021

The Mutual Defense Treaty between South Korea and the United States had many lasting political, social, and economic effects. From weeks after the treaty was signed to present day, the Mutual Defense Treaty affected both South Korea and the United States in unexpected ways. In regards to South Korea, the signing of the Mutual Defense Treaty quickly ended the Korean War. 28,500 American troops were stationed in South Korea.

The Korean Armistice Agreement was signed only two months prior to the signing of the Mutual Defense Treaty.

The Mutual Defense Treaty also had substantial effects on the economies of both The United States and South Korea. South Korea's economy dramatically increased as a result of this relationship. In regards to other US alliances, there has not been a change as dramatic as the increase of South Korea's economic wealth. From the time that the Mutual Defense Treaty was signed in 1953 to 2015, South Koreans went from being ten percent as wealthy as Americans to seventy percent as wealthy as Americans. As a result of this sudden change, South Korea faced a change in expectations regarding their technology innovations. South Korea has depended on the United States for their technology prior to the Mutual Defense Treaty, however, they have encountered a new pressure to develop their own defense technologies now that they have the economic power to do so as a result of the Mutual Defense Treaty.

== South Korean beliefs about the treaty ==
After the signing of the treaty there was tension between the Republic of Korea and the United States due to many people in South Korea believed that the United States would not hold up their side of the treaty. This belief was strengthened with the withdrawal of troops under the presidencies of Nixon and Carter. Another point of contention was in 1980 and had to do with the belief that many of the U.S. troops stationed in Korea were supportive of Park Chung-hee, the leader of South Korea at that time.

In 2009, under the Obama administration, the White House released a Joint Vision Statement in which it stated the goals of the two states going forward. The statement put forth that the Mutual Defense Treaty has acted as the foundation for the rest of the cooperation that has occurred between the Republic of Korea and the United States. Going forward the two governments will not only focus on security, but also economic, political, and social issues and interactions.

With the advent of nuclear weapons, the Treaty soon became more about being protected from the threat of nuclear warfare. In a survey given in 2014 it was found that 52.2 per cent of South Koreans believed that the United States would retaliate with nuclear weapons if North Korea attacked them with nuclear warfare first. While a little over half the citizens in South Korea think the United States would help, it was found that 61.3 per cent of citizens believe that the Republic of Korea needs to create their own arsenal of nuclear weapons.

== See also ==
- United Nations Command
- United States Forces Korea
- U.S.–South Korea Status of Forces Agreement
- Korean DMZ Conflict
