= Sinchon Massacre =

Mass killings of civilians in Sinchon, North Korea

- Part of Korean War
- Location: 38°21′16″N 125°28′50″E; Sinchon, North Korea
- Date: 17 October 1950 – 7 December 1950; 75 years ago
- Target: Sinchon residents
- Attack type: Massacre
- Deaths: 30,000–35,383 (North Korean claim)
- Accused: South Korean Army, United States Armed Forces (North Korean claim); Korean People's Army, South Korean anti-communist vigilantes (South Korean sources)

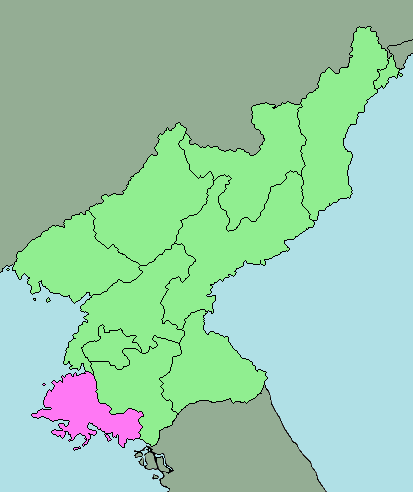
The location of South Hwanghae Province.

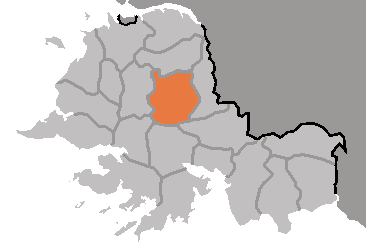
The location of Sinchon in South Hwanghae Province.

The Sinchon Massacre (Korean: 신천 양민학살 사건; Hanja: 信川良民虐殺事件; lit. 'Sinchon Civilian Massacre') was a massacre of civilians between 17 October and 7 December 1950, in or near the town of Sinchon (currently part of South Hwanghae Province, North Korea). North Korean sources state the massacre was committed by the U.S. military and the South Korean army and that 30,000–35,383 people were killed in Sinchon. South Korean sources dispute who the perpetrators were and accuse both communists (the North Korean army) and a small group of right-wing vigilantes of the killings. Most of the victims were anti-communist residents of Sinchon, along with a small group of pro-communist residents. In South Korea, it is referred to as an anti-communist uprising. The event took place during the second phase of the Korean War and the retreat of the North Korean government from Hwanghae Province.

== Backgrounds ==
Since 1945, Kim Il-sung, supported by the Soviet Union, seized power in North Korea and rapidly emerged as the leader of the Korean left-wing factions, replacing the indigenous communist movement led by Pak Hon-yong and the moderate socialist Lyuh Woon-hyung's organization of the People's Republic of Korea. Even after the death of Cho Man-sik, the right-wing leader in North Korea, and the subsequent absorption of remaining right-wing supporters in the form of the Korean Social Democratic Party, the presence of influential local right-wing supporters in the northwestern region, as well as some religious groups, continued to pose a potential threat to the new regime. The drastic land reform in North Korea, with the frequent suppression of Christians by Soviet authorities, including the Sinuiju Incident of 1945, forced a large number of right-wing supporters and Christians to exile to the South, and fueled aggressive anti-communist sentiments among the Korean right-wing factions.

This influenced the formation of right-wing militias in North Korea during the Korean War, called chiandae (치안대; "security force"), which welcomed the advance of South Korean troops and carried out retaliatory operations against the communists, including civilians. Regardless of whether the U.S. intervenes, many scholars believe that these chiandae forces constituted the majority of the right-wing camp involved in the Sinchon massacre.

Meanwhile, it is also well-recorded that North Korean armed forces carried out massacres across the country in their occupied territories, against anti-communist civilians, defectors, landowners, Christians, and individuals who collaborated with the authorities during South Korean rule, sometimes under the pretext of execution by "people's courts". These massacres, usually carried out systematically under the orders of the Workers' Party, often occurred particularly during the North Korean military's retreats; which contributed to obscuring the leading forces behind the coetaneous mass killing in Sinchon.

== North Korean claim ==
According to North Korean sources, approximately 35,000 people were killed by American military forces and their supporters during the span of 52 days. This figure represents about one-quarter of the population of Sinchon at the time. The Sinchon Museum of American War Atrocities, established in 1958, displays the remains and belongings of those who were killed in the incident. In schools, North Koreans are taught that Americans "hammered nails into victims' heads" and "sliced off women's breasts." Officials "copy all the images from the museum and plaster them all over school corridors."

According to a dispatch, titled "Sinchon simmering with rage", released on 3 July 1998 by the Korean Central News Agency:

The Yankees separated the mothers from their children before pouring gasoline at the children and babies who were crying for drinking water and milk. When the children and babies sucked gasoline and were crying, feeling great pains, the Yankees threw flaming torches to kill them. They also threw explosives at the mothers. The American soldiers drowned over 2,000 innocent people by dropping them from Soktang bridge. They also drowned more than 1,000 women in Sowon reservoir. Upwards of 1,200 patriotic-minded people detained in an ice warehouse were bitten to death by military dogs. The head of master Yun Hae Won of Jungsan Primary School was sawed up alive. The eyeballs and breasts of chairwoman Pak Yong Gyo of the women’s union of the Sinchon Tobacco Factory were gouged out. The enemies disembowled a pregnant woman to hold up a 9 month-old embryo on the end of a bayonet, laughing aloud. The yankees massacred 35,383 innocent Koreans, or a quarter of the population of Sinchon in 52 days of their occupation of the place. Exhibited in the Sinchon Museum are 6,465 items of evidences and some 450 pictures showing the man-hunting of the U.S. imperialist brutes. A survey group of the International Association of Lawyers published a joint communique in 1952 bitterly denouncing the U.S. imperialists’ massacre in Sinchon as an unprecedented-in-scope murder. The Korean people will remember the massacre for all ages and requite blood with blood.

Kim Jong-il visited the museum in 1998. Kim Jong-un visited in November 2014 to "strengthen the anti-U.S. lessons for our military and people... and to powerfully unite the 10 million soldiers and people in the battle against the United States." In July 2015, Kim Jong-un visited again with senior military official Hwang Pyong-so, revealing a major expansion of the Sinchon massacre museum.

== NGO claims ==
In a report prepared in Pyongyang, the non-governmental and historically Communist-affiliated International Association of Democratic Lawyers lists several alleged incidents of mass murder by U.S. soldiers in Sinchon. In addition, they claimed that American troops had beheaded up to 300 North Koreans using Japanese samurai swords, and that the US Air Force was using bacteriological warfare in Korea. Relying on oral testimony from North Koreans, the International Association of Democratic Lawyers report claims that the Sinchon massacre was overseen by a General "Harrison" or "Halison", an apparent reference to William Kelly Harrison, whom they allege personally conducted many of the atrocities. Their report claims that Harrison took photos of the massacre; however, there is no evidence to confirm their testimony.

Harrison was reportedly shocked by the claim. Investigative reports have concluded there was no Harrison in the area at the time, and that this was either a pseudonym or a false claim. The Museum in Sinchon has a photo of a man, allegedly Harrison, giving the full name "Harrison D. Maddon." The photo shows a tall man standing to the left of a wreath with a UN flag over it, his back turned to the camera, his face not visible, holding a cap in his hand behind his back, and another, indistinct object visible immediately in front of the man.

According to Dong-Choon Kim, a former commissioner of the Truth and Reconciliation Commission, the Sinchon massacre was carried out by "right-wing security police and a youth group." Sunghoon Han says that "right-wing security units" were responsible for the killings.

The South Korea-based Institute for Korean Historical Studies concludes that both Communists and anti-Communist vigilantes engaged in wholesale slaughter throughout the area and that the 19th Infantry Regiment took the city and failed to prevent the South Korean secret police that came with them from perpetrating the civilian murders; however, the 19th Infantry Regiment did not participate themselves. Furthermore, according to the institute, after North Korean army retook the city, the population was again purged. South Korean novelist Hwang Sok-yong claims that the massacre was caused by a local rivalry that used the fog of war as a pretense.

In 1989, Chicago Tribune, the journalist Uli Schmitzer wrote:

If any truth about massacres in Chichon (Sinchon) ever existed, the evidence has long ago been obscured. The town, 70 miles [110 km] south of the North Korean capital, Pyongyang, has been turned into a national shrine by a ruthless propaganda machine that has fueled anti-American passions for 36 years in support of an institutionalized, regimented communist regime.

The historian Bruce Cumings, in his book War and Television, stated:

[T]he major part of the Sinch’on massacres were carried out by Korean Christians who had fled the Sinch’on area for the South. In my opinion, If any Americans were present they were probably KMAG [Korean Military Advisory Group] personnel, who witnessed many South Korean atrocities against civilians; the Koreans I spoke with were adamant that Americans had carried out the massacres, but it is also true that Koreans do not like to admit that Koreans could do such things, unless they are following American or (in the colonial period) Japanese orders.

== Representation in other media ==
- South Korean novelist Hwang Sok-yong's novel The Guest, based on interviews with a Korean Christian pastor, addresses the Sinchon massacre.

== See also ==
- List of massacres in North Korea
- List of massacres in South Korea
- Picasso, Massacre in Korea
- Sinchon Museum of American War Atrocities
