= Yangju highway incident =

2002 accidental deaths in South Korea

Coordinates: 37.857722°N 126.948972°E

Victims of Yangju highway incident: Shim Mi-seon (left) and Shin Hyo-sun

The Yangju highway incident, also known as the Yangju training accident or Highway 56 Accident, occurred on 13 June 2002, in Yangju, Gyeonggi-do, South Korea. A United States Army armored vehicle-launched bridge, returning to base in Uijeongbu on a public road after training maneuvers in the countryside, struck and killed two 14-year-old South Korean schoolgirls, Shin Hyo-soon (Korean: 신효순) and Shim Mi-seon (심미선).

The American soldiers involved were found not guilty of negligent homicide in the court martial, further inflaming anti-American sentiment in South Korea and sparking a series of candlelight vigil protests in protest of their deaths. The memory of the two schoolgirls is commemorated annually in South Korea.

== Incident ==
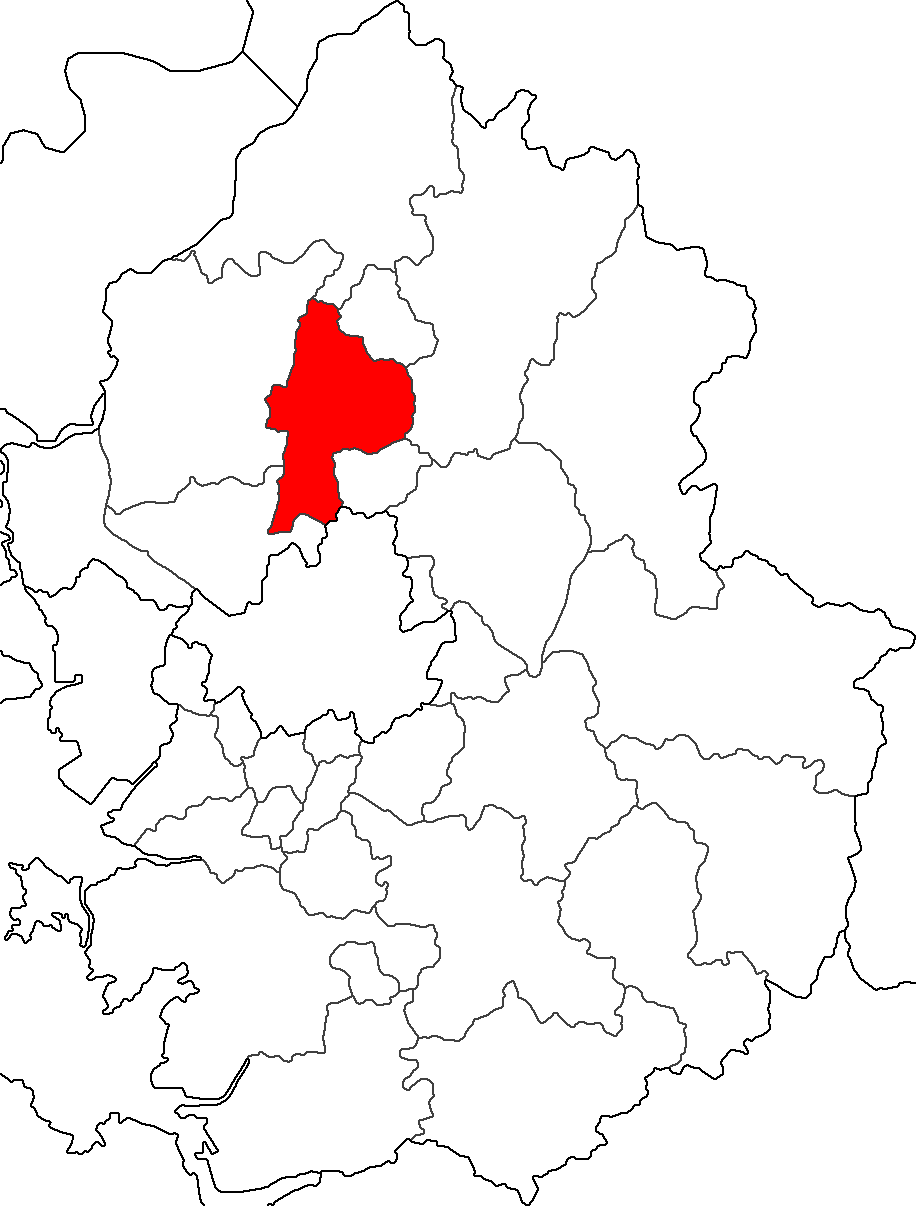
Yangju

A U.S. military convoy from the 2nd Infantry Division of Eighth United States Army set out to undertake a training exercise at a range approximately 20 kilometers (12 mi) north of metropolitan Seoul. As the convoy passed along a narrow country road near Yangju City, Gyeonggi Province, one of the convoy's armored vehicles, weighing approximately 57 tons, struck and killed two 14-year-old South Korean schoolgirls, Shim Mi-seon and Shin Hyo-sun, as they walked along the side of the roadway on their way to a birthday party.

== Legal proceedings ==
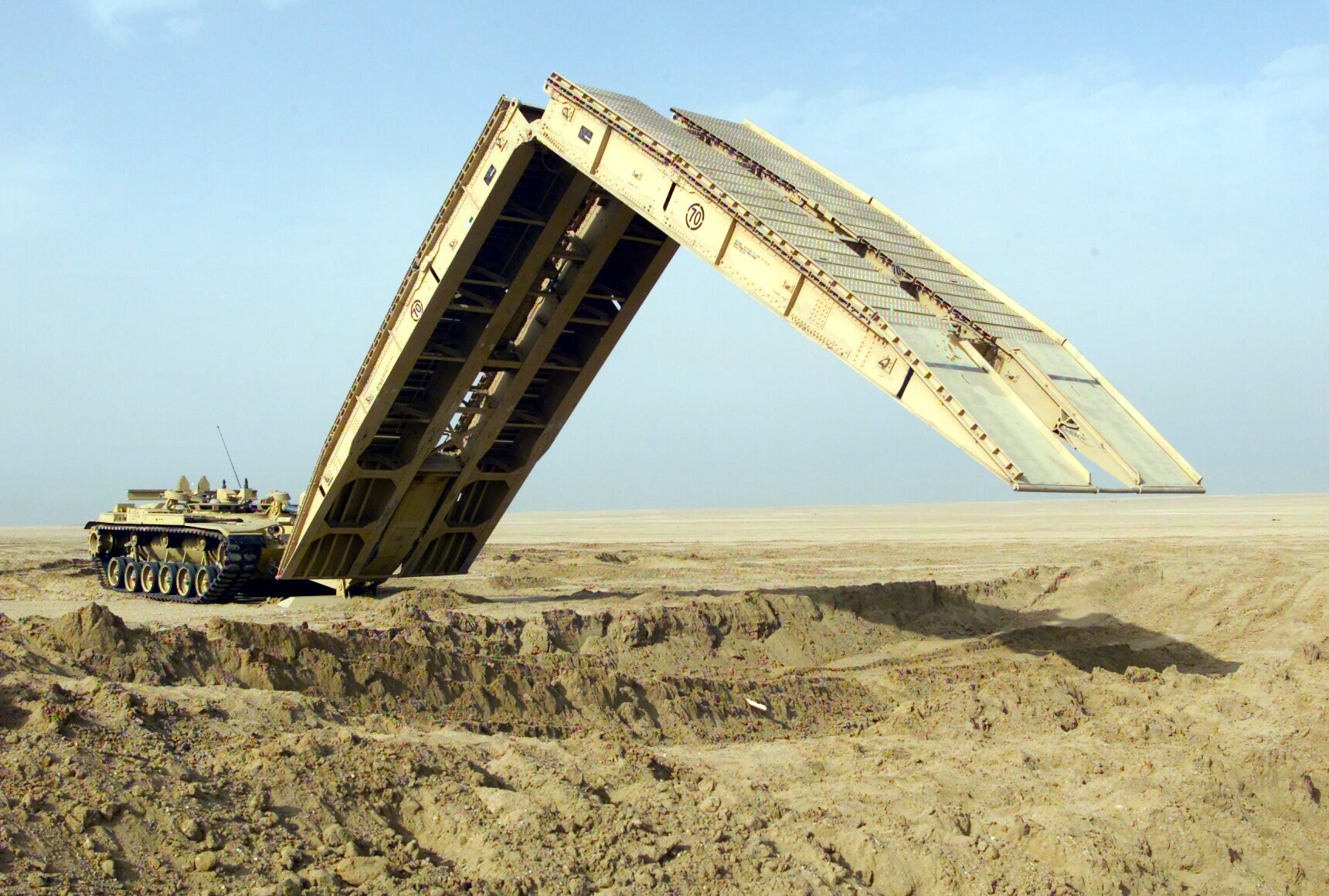
An American M60A1 Armored Vehicle-Launched Bridge (AVLB), February 2003.

On 5 July 2002, as a result of this incident, and in accordance with the U.S.-ROK Status of Forces Agreement (SOFA), which stipulates that U.S. military personnel fall under the jurisdiction of U.S. military courts should they commit crimes while performing official duties, both the driver of the vehicle, Sergeant Mark Walker, and the vehicle's commander, Sergeant Fernando Nino, were charged with "negligent homicide” under the U.S. military's Uniform Code of Military Justice (UCMJ) for "negligently failing to ensure the safe operation of the vehicle."

Seeking to prosecute the two soldiers in civilian courts under South Korean law, on 10 July, the South Korean Justice Ministry requested that the USFK command transfer jurisdiction in the case to the South Korean legal system. While the SOFA stipulates that U.S. military personnel performing official duties fall under the jurisdiction of U.S. military courts, jurisdiction can be transferred to South Korea at the discretion of the U.S. military commander.

Citing concerns about setting a precedent in terms of allowing civilian proceedings against U.S. military personnel, then Judge Advocate of the USFK, Colonel Kent Myers, said the U.S. command would not do so, noting that the U.S. Army had waived jurisdiction only once before in a case in which the act committed was intentional and not accidental. In a statement issued by the USFK, Myers noted that Walker and Nino were clearly performing assigned duties in an official capacity and were therefore subject to the UCMJ under the U.S.-ROK SOFA.

Although they refused the request of the South Korean Justice Ministry, American officials invited more than 30 media representatives, representatives from the South Korean Justice Ministry, the South Korean Ministry of Foreign Affairs and Trade, and from other South Korean non-governmental organizations (NGOs) to observe the trials. Rooms with closed circuit television (CCTV) coverage were provided to accommodate the increased level of interest. Families of the victims were invited to attend and, to protect their privacy, were offered the use of a separate CCTV-equipped room staffed with an interpreter and military lawyer to explain the processes involved. Public statements made by U.S. officials stressed the fair and impartial nature of the U.S. military legal process.

During the proceedings, lawyers for Nino contended that he attempted to alert Walker to the presence of the two girls on the periphery of the road. Reports differ as to whether Walker did not hear the order due to a defective communications device or because he had altered the frequency of his radio in order to communicate with others in the convoy.

Nino and Walker were subsequently found not guilty of "negligent homicide" in verdicts issued independently by two separate panels on Wednesday, November 20 and Friday, 22 November 2002. While demonstrators questioned the legitimacy and objectivity of the U.S. military court and its verdict, the South Korean Justice Ministry voiced dissatisfaction with the verdict, but respect for the process as employed.

== Acquittal and expressions of anti-American sentiment ==
Full apologies were issued by American civilian and military officials at various levels of authority immediately after the incident and repeated throughout the course of the legal proceedings. Visits were made to the families of the two victims, and compensation was paid to the surviving family members. U.S. President George W. Bush phoned then South Korean President Kim Dae-jung and expressed his regret over the deaths of the two South Korean schoolgirls.

The acquittal of the two servicemen sparked anti-American demonstrations in various locations, termed "the biggest anti-American protests the country has seen in recent years" by a BBC report covering the December 2002 visit of then U.S. Deputy Secretary of State Richard Armitage to South Korea. The same report suggested that presidential elections in South Korea, set to take place that same December, may have focused attention on the issue as a larger referendum on the U.S.-ROK relationship, and thus exacerbated tensions.

In addition to anger, sadness, and outrage at the death of the two girls, this move sparked protests in several locations as South Koreans expressed a desire for greater control over foreign military forces stationed in South Korea and urged that the SOFA be revised accordingly. Father Mun Jeong-hyeon, a Catholic priest active in the anti-USFK movement, began a hunger strike outside the U.S. Embassy in Seoul. He was a leader of the Pan National Committee, during the Daechuri protests. The Daechuri Protests were a 2005/6 protest against the expansion of Camp Humphreys, a U.S. military base, in the small rural village of Daechuri.

In addition to a series of large demonstrations at U.S. military installations and a rally attended by more than 50,000 people in Seoul during the second week of December, attacks, including fire bombings, were launched at the Yongsan Garrison and both the South Korean and American personnel responsible for guarding U.S. military installations in South Korea. In one incident in December 2002, an unarmed U.S. Army officer, Lieutenant Colonel Steven A. Boylan, was attacked by three South Korean men wielding a knife outside the Garrison. Boylan suffered only minor injuries.

On 13 June 2017, multiple K-pop stars boycotted or left the performance midway during a US military event for a camp stationed in Uijeongbu, citing protests by activists that the event fell on the 15th anniversary of the Yangju highway incident.

== Aftermath ==
In the months following the incident, both the U.S. military and the South Korean government took actions to attempt to address the circumstances seen as having led to the deaths of the two schoolgirls. As of August 2002, the U.S. Army banned all armored vehicles of the type involved in the June 13 accident from civilian roads. The U.S. Army announced more than 20 additional measures to improve safety during training exercises, including improvements to the notification system used to communicate with community leaders about upcoming training exercises, the installation of additional mirrors on U.S. Army vehicles to improve driver visibility, and the retrofitting of additional intercom systems on U.S. military vehicles to allow for direct communication between drivers and vehicle commanders.

Officials from Gyeonggi Province took actions to address another issue seen to have contributed to the accident, inadequate transportation infrastructure. Reports indicated that one factor that may have contributed to the deaths of Shim Mi-son and Shin Hyo-sun, was the width and design of the roads in the area near their home village. Not only are roads in the area narrow, they do not always have space allocated along their periphery for pedestrians to use as walkways. Some have posited that this design contributes to the number of traffic accidents in South Korea in general.

Given that the armored vehicles traveling in the convoy on June 13 are wider than both a typical passenger vehicle and than the lanes marked on most roads, and that the two girls were struck on the right-hand side of an uphill S-curve curving to the right, some reports posited that the design of the road where the accident occurred, and the width of the vehicles, the lanes on the road, and the road itself may have exacerbated the dangers already inherent when military vehicles operate within a civilian environment.

As such, improvements were made to the road where the incident took place as part of a $94 million plan to improve more than 100 miles (160 km) of roads throughout the province. A major focal point of the project was the completion of improvements to roads used by the 2nd Infantry Division. Officials focused on widening, straightening, and smoothing the roads, while adding footpaths. Begun in December 2002, reports suggest the project was 85 percent complete as of February 2004 and set to be concluded by April 2004. While the South Korean national government spent almost $1 million to acquire the land necessary to widen several stretches of road, in some cases by 2–3 feet, with the cost of construction falling upon the Gyeonggi provincial government.

The First Moranbong Middle School in Pyongyang, North Korea, declared Shin and Shim to be honorary students in 2003 as part of its Anti-American propaganda.

== See also ==
- Anti-American sentiment in Korea
- Murder of Yun Geum-i
- Demonstrations at Yongsan Garrison
- Misun-Hyosun vigil
- Death of Teo Peter
- Death of Harry Dunn
- Padilla car crash
- Eskridge car crash
- 1962 Szczecin military parade accident
