= Busan Modern History Museum =

Museum in Busan, South Korea

Coordinates: 35°06′10″N 129°01′52″E

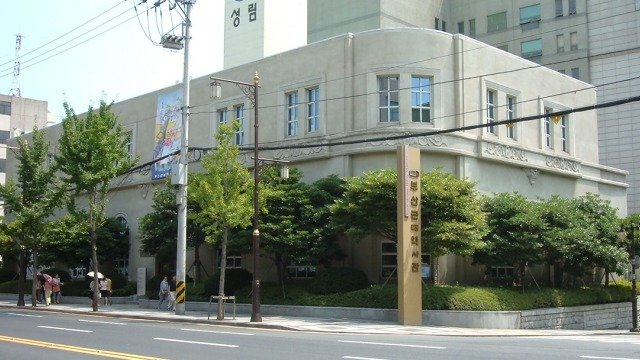
Busan Modern History Museum

The Busan Modern History Museum (Korean: 부산근대역사관; Hanja: 釜山近代歷史館) is a museum in Busan, South Korea.

The building was originally constructed during the Japanese occupation of Korea for the Oriental Development Company an organisation used to support Japanese colonization of Korea. Following the liberation of Korea in 1945 it was later used as the United States Information Service and was the site of the Busan American Cultural Service building arson during student protests in 1982.
