= Sinchon Museum of American War Atrocities =

Museum of American War Atrocities
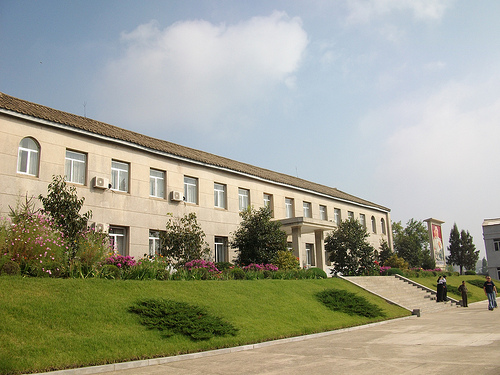
- The main building of the Sinchon Museum of American War Atrocities
- Established: 26 March 1958; 68 years ago
- Location: North Korea
- Coordinates: 38°21′17″N 125°29′15″E
- Type: War museum

The Sinchon Museum of American War Atrocities (Korean: 신천박물관) is a museum dedicated to the Sinchon Massacre, a massacre of North Korean civilians during the Korean War by South Korean and US troops. The museum is located in Sinchon County of North Korea. In July 2015, the museum was rebuilt and moved to a new location in the country.

== History ==
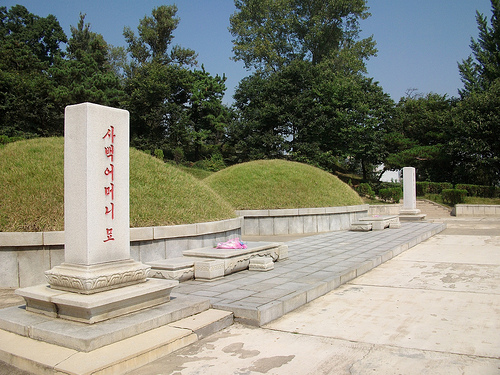
The grave of the 400 mothers and children killed by US and South Korean troops in the surrounding areas of the museum

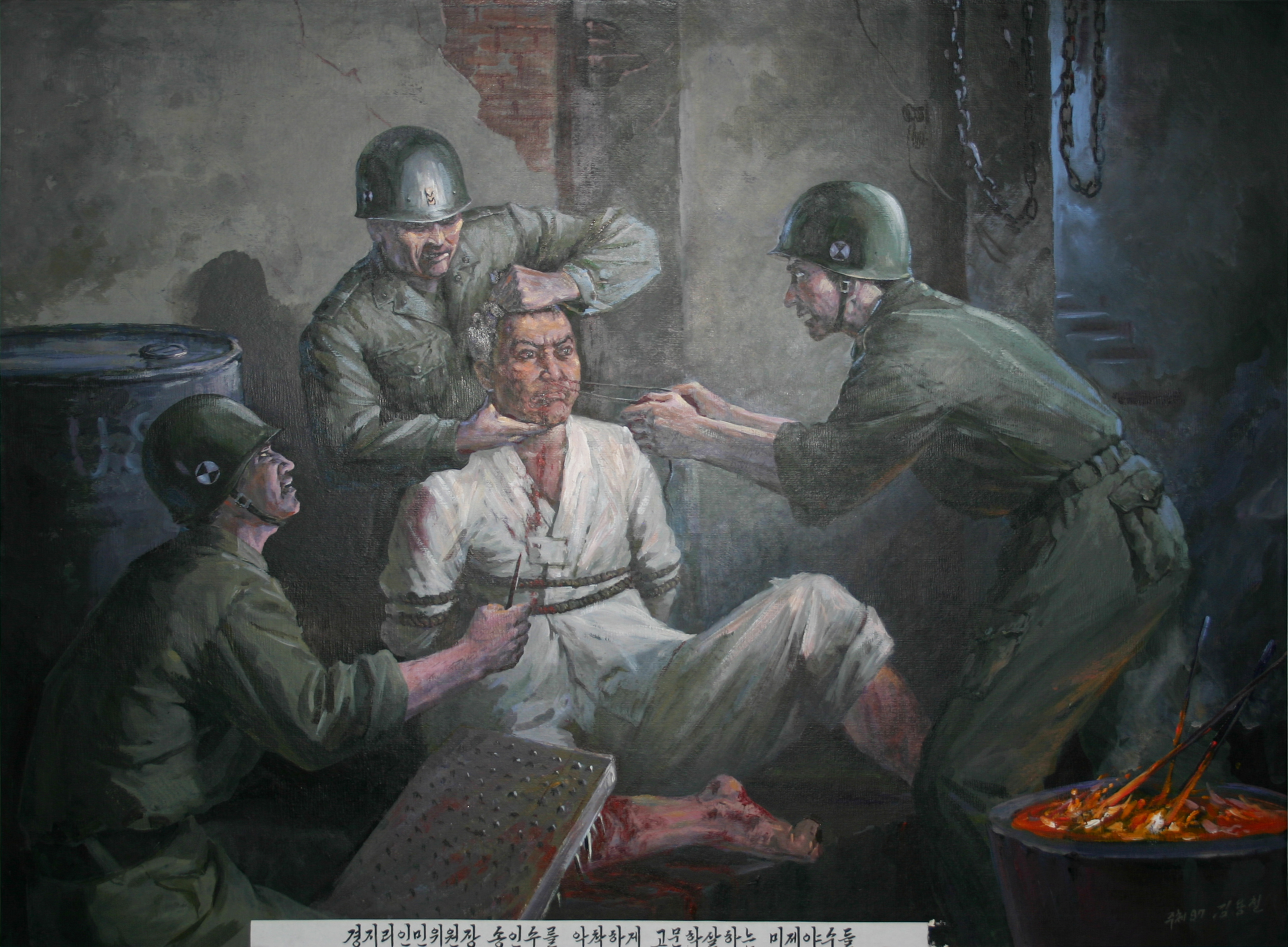
Paintings on the walls of the museum

The Sinchon Museum of American War Atrocities houses exhibits the deaths of over 35,000 people from 17 October to 7 December 1950, at the same period of time when the major cities of North Korea, such as Pyongyang (the capital city) and Hamhung, were under wartime occupation by South Korean, American and United Nations military forces.

The South Korean-based Institute for Korean Historical Studies concluded that both Communists and anti-Communist vigilantes engaged in wholesale slaughter throughout the area, and that the 19th Infantry Regiment took the city and failed to prevent the South Korean secret police that came with them from perpetrating the civilian murders; however, the regiment did not participate themselves. Furthermore, when North Korean communists retook the city, the population was again purged. Other sources have concluded that the "massacre" was caused by a local rivalry that used the fog of war as a pretense.

== Notable visitors ==
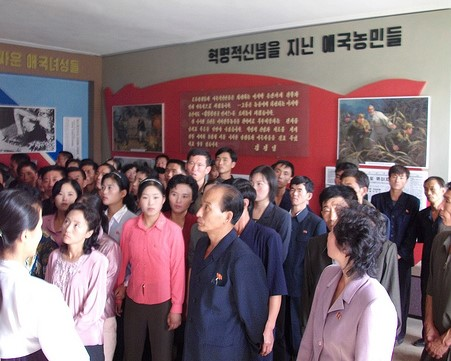
North Koreans touring the museum.

Kim Il Sung visited the museum in 1953 and 1958, as did his son, Kim Jong Il, who paid a visit there in 1962 and 1998.

North Korean leader Kim Jong Un (the son of Kim Jong Il and the grandson of Kim Il Sung) visited the museum along with his sister in 2014.

== See also ==
- List of museums in North Korea
