= Camp Humphreys expansion controversy =

Military base controversy in South Korea

The Pyeongtaek US military base relocation issue refers to a series of incidents that occurred around the end of 2008 between the US 2nd Infantry Division and the Camp Humphreys military base in Yongsan District, Seoul, South Korea, between the local residents and civic groups and the Ministry of the Republic of Korea regarding the relocation and expansion of the base. In a broad sense, it includes the opposition of residents and civic groups and the clashes with the police that occurred after the decision to relocate the US military base in 2004, and in a narrow sense, it refers only to the large-scale clashes resulting from the administrative execution that the police were deployed to on May 4, 2006. It is also called the Daechuri Incident (大秋里 事態) or the Camp Humphreys expansion controversy and the operation name is Hwangsaeul at Dawn.

== History ==
=== Background ===
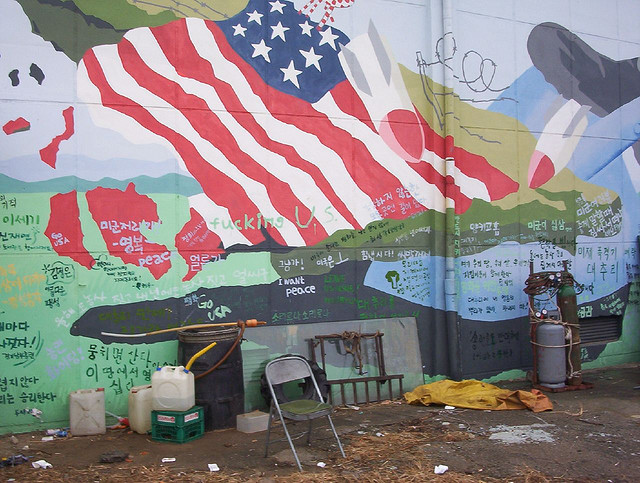
Anti-American slogan painting on the exterior wall of the Daechuri Agricultural Cooperative warehouse

August 2004, South Korea and the United States agreed to an agreement to relocate the Yongsan base and the 2nd US Division to Pyeongtaek, and officially signed the agreement on October 28 of that year. Since the South Korean government had to obtain National Assembly approval for the related agreement due to the enormous cost incurred due to the base relocation, it submitted a ratification bill to the National Assembly on October 29, and the ratification bill was passed on December 9. As the base was expanded and relocated to the Pyeongtaek area by 3.49 million pyeong, 535 households (1,372 people) had to relocate. After the National Assembly's ratification, the Ministry of National Defense began compensating for the land. During the process of land acquisition and compensation, the unilateral execution of the Ministry of National Defense led to opposition and friction from the residents of Daechuri, and when a majority of the residents of Daechuri, Pyeongseong, and Doduri refused to acquire the land, the Central Land Expropriation Committee made a decision in November 2005 to deposit the land compensation money in court, after which the Ministry of National Defense was able to transfer ownership to the Ministry of National Defense without the consent of the residents. Starting in the winter of 2005, the Ministry of National Defense prohibited the residents from farming, and starting in the spring of 2006, there was a conflict between the residents who wanted to farm and the Ministry of National Defense. The residents joined forces with civic groups opposing the relocation and expansion of the US military base.

=== Progress ===
- Date: May 4, 2006
- Location: Gyesung Elementary School Daechu Branch School, Daechu-ri, Paengseong-eup, Pyeongtaek-si, Gyeonggi-do
- Result: Barbed wire installed at the site of Daechu Branch School demolition and relocation, and protests by civic groups continue
- Participants in the protest: Estimated at 1,000 people (Daechu-ri/Doduri residents in Pyeongtaek, members of the Pyeongtaek Pan-Daehwa Committee, members of the Pyeongtaek City Countermeasure Committee, Pyeongtaek Guardians, etc.)
- Public power mobilized: 13,000 police officers from 110 companies, approximately 1,200 employees of service companies, and approximately 2,000 soldiers (military forces were also mobilized to suppress the protest)
- Casualties: Gyeonggi-do Daily Fire and Disaster Headquarters Status Report (May 4, 2006) Total number of injured people: 137 (13 seriously injured, 124 slightly injured. Of these injured people, 32 riot police and 105 protesters were injured), and all 137 people received emergency treatment on the spot and were transferred to 6 nearby hospitals.

The conflict between the Ministry of National Defense and the residents began to escalate on March 15, 2006, with the full-scale deployment of police and contracted troops. On March 15, the Ministry of National Defense deployed a forklift and contracted troops to dig up the rice fields where seeds had been planted, and among the Daechuri and Doduri residents and citizens who tried to stop them, 40 were taken away and 2 were arrested. Another conflict occurred on April 7, with 31 people taken away and 2 arrested. At the end of April, the Ministry of National Defense announced its position to demolish the vinyl greenhouses for candlelight vigils installed at the Daechu Branch School and the playground, where ownership had been transferred. In an attempt to stop this, about 1,000 residents, members of the Pan-National Committee, and members of the Pyeongtaek City Countermeasures Committee stayed up all night to protect the Daechu Branch School from the night of May 3. At 4 a.m. on May 4, 13,000 police officers from 110 companies entered the Daechu Branch School and began to arrest protesters. At around 7 a.m., the Daechu Branch School was surrounded by police, and after arresting protesters on the second floor of the school, the demolition of the school began. Not only the school building, but also the trees and facilities on the playground were demolished, and soldiers who were deployed at the same time installed barbed wire around the area where the US military base was planned to be built. Of the 1,000 people who gathered at Daechu Branch School during this forced execution, 524 were taken away, and according to the records of the Gyeonggi-do Fire and Disaster Headquarters, 137 people (32 police officers and 105 protesters) received emergency treatment. Including those who were not transported by fire department ambulance, it is estimated that 200 to 300 people were injured that day. 13,000 police officers from 110 companies, 1,200 employees of service companies, and 3,000 soldiers were mobilized for the forced execution.

In January 2007, relocation negotiations began between the residents who remained in Daechu-ri Doduri and the government. The candlelight vigils by residents that began on September 1, 2004, ended on March 24, 2007, after 935 days, and in April, the residents moved out of the village and moved to temporary residences, completing the forced eviction by the Ministry of National Defense.

== Controversy ==
There is a claim that anti-American activists, etc., who were not actual residents, took the lead in protesting against the relocation of the Daechuri US military base, such as moving their addresses to the empty houses of residents who had moved after the decision to relocate the base to Daechuri and the conclusion of a compensation agreement with the Ministry of National Defense.

Some people who opposed the relocation of the Daechuri base also damaged vehicles belonging to residents who had reached a compensation agreement with the Ministry of National Defense.

At the time, there is a claim that the protesters were armed with spears and Molotov cocktails and threatened and attacked the police and military units, making it inevitable to suppress them by force, and as a result, many people were injured among the military, police, and protesters.

== Compensation ==
The land for which compensation agreements were not reached in Daechuri accounted for 21% of the total land to be purchased, and 79% was agreed upon by residents.

The average compensation for residents of Daechuri and Doduri was 600 million won (530 million won for Daechuri and 660 million won for Doduri). The compensation for the 10 or so key executives of the Pyeongseong Countermeasures Committee was a maximum of 2.79 billion won, a minimum of 620 million won, and an average of 1.92 billion won.

On the other hand, some residents of Daechuri say that the Ministry of National Defense is inflating the compensation

== Problems with some of the compensation agreement conditions not being fulfilled ==
Daechuri residents were promised that they would be able to continue to use Daechuri as the administrative name of the Nowai Housing Complex where they moved, but the administrative name change was not made due to opposition from Nowai 2-ri residents. The residents of Pyeonghwa Village filed an administrative lawsuit demanding the administrative name change, but lost. In addition, the government promised to give them the option to choose the location of commercial buildings when a new city is built in Pyeongtaek, but during the construction of Godeok International New City, LH did not keep this promise and proceeded with the sale. Residents won the lawsuit regarding the right to choose the location in the first and second trials. Since the commercial land has already been sold and developed, Daechuri residents are currently in the process of filing a separate lawsuit for damages.

== See also ==
- Camp Humphreys
