= U.S.–South Korea Status of Forces Agreement =

Agreement on land use

U.S.-South Korea Status of Forces Agreement
Agreement Under Article IV of the Mutual Defense Treaty Between the United States of America and the Republic of Korea, Regarding Facilities and Areas and the Status of United States Armed Forces in the Republic of Korea
- Emblem of the United States Forces Korea (USFK)
- Signed: July 9, 1966
- Location: Seoul
- Effective: February 9, 1967
- Parties: United States; South Korea
- Language: English

The U.S.–South Korea Status of Forces Agreement (Hangul: 주한 미군 지위 협정; Hanja: 駐韓美軍地位協定, SOFA), formally Agreement under Article IV of the Mutual Defence Treaty between the Republic of Korea and the United States, Regarding Facilities and Areas and the Status of United States Armed Forces in the Republic of Korea, is an agreement between South Korea and the U.S. approved and enacted in 1967 and revised in 1991 and 2001. It is a status of forces agreement that covers the regulation and treatment of United States Forces in South Korea. For example, the SOFA agreement limits how Korean police can intervene in affairs regarding American personnel. Lt. General David R. Iverson is the U.S. representative to the joint committee on the Status of Forces Agreement.

The U.S.–South Korea Status of Forces Agreement is often a focal point for political disputes regarding US presence in South Korea. The agreement's promotion of U.S. military presence in South Korea has served as a catalyst for many base expansion protests such as the Daechuri Protests which was a 2005/6 protest against the expansion of U.S. military base Camp Humphreys.

The cost of maintaining U.S. troops in South Korea is borne by both countries. The costs borne by South Korea are negotiated through multiyear Special Measures Agreements signed by both countries.

== See also ==
- United States Forces Korea
- Status of forces agreement
- Mutual Defense Treaty (United States–South Korea)
