= Myeongil-dong =

- Country: South Korea

Area
  - Total: 1.58 km^{2} (0.61 sq mi)

Population (2008)
  - Total: 48,664

Korean name
- Hangul: 명일동
- Hanja: 明逸洞
- RR: Myeongil-dong
- MR: Myŏngil-tong

Community service center

Myeongil-dong (Korean: 명일동) is a dong (neighbourhood) of Gangdong District, Seoul, South Korea.

== History ==
The name of Myeongil was named after 'Myeongil-won' during Goryeo Dynasty in the 10th century. Myeongil-won was an accommodation facilities and duty station of renting or transferring horses for the Public officials who go a business trip. In modern times, Myeongil-dong was actually a part of Myeongil-ri, Gucheon-myeon, Gwangju, Gyeonggi-do Province, and then be included into Seoul in 1963. Even nowadays, the street of Gucheonmyeon-gil still exists. From the late 1970s to mid-1980s, large scale of falm and orchard were renovated into huge apartments complex built by Korea National Housing Corporation (currently Korea Land & Housing Corporation), Samick, Woosung, Hanyang and Hyundai Engineering and Construction and developed as one of new town in Seoul, along with Mok-dong and Sanggye-dong in the 1990s. In 1995, Seoul Subway Line 5 was passed through this area stopping at Godeok Station, Myeongil Station and Gubeundari Station. Currently, Myeongil-dong is well known for the location of Myungsung Presbyterian Church and neighborhood of Hanyoung Foreign Language High School.

== Area information ==
The new 5-digit postal code for Myeongil-dong is 05257.

The 6-digit postal code, used until 2015, was 134-070. 134 is for Gangdong District and 070 is for Myeongil-dong.

== See also ==
- Administrative divisions of Seoul
- Administrative divisions of South Korea
