= Anjeong-ri =

Coordinates: 36.960°N 127.045°E

- community
- Interactive map of Anjeong-ri
- Country: South Korea

Korean name
- Hangul: 안정리
- Hanja: 安停里
- RR: Anjeong-ri
- MR: Anjŏng-ri

Anjeong-ri (Korean: 안정리) is a community located in Paengseong-eup, Pyeongtaek City, Gyeonggi Province, South Korea. It is located on the perimeter of Camp Humphreys, a United States Army garrison undergoing rapid expansion.

== History ==
In 1919, during the period of Japanese rule, the government built an airfield in Anjeong-ri. This airfield was enlarged over the years and by 1941 contained the Imperial Japanese Navy’s Establishment Corps 302, a group of fighter planes, including the Mitsubishi Zero. In 1945, following the defeat of Japan in WWII, the base was used by American forces. As of 2015, it was under expansion to become the largest military base in South Korea, combining Republic of Korea Army and US Army forces. The village of Anjeong-ri is expanding to meet the infrastructure needs as the civilian and military population grows.
