= Gubeundari station =

Train station in South Korea

Coordinates: 37°32′44″N 127°08′34″E

| 굽은다리 (강동구민회관앞); Gubeundari (Gangdong Community Center) |
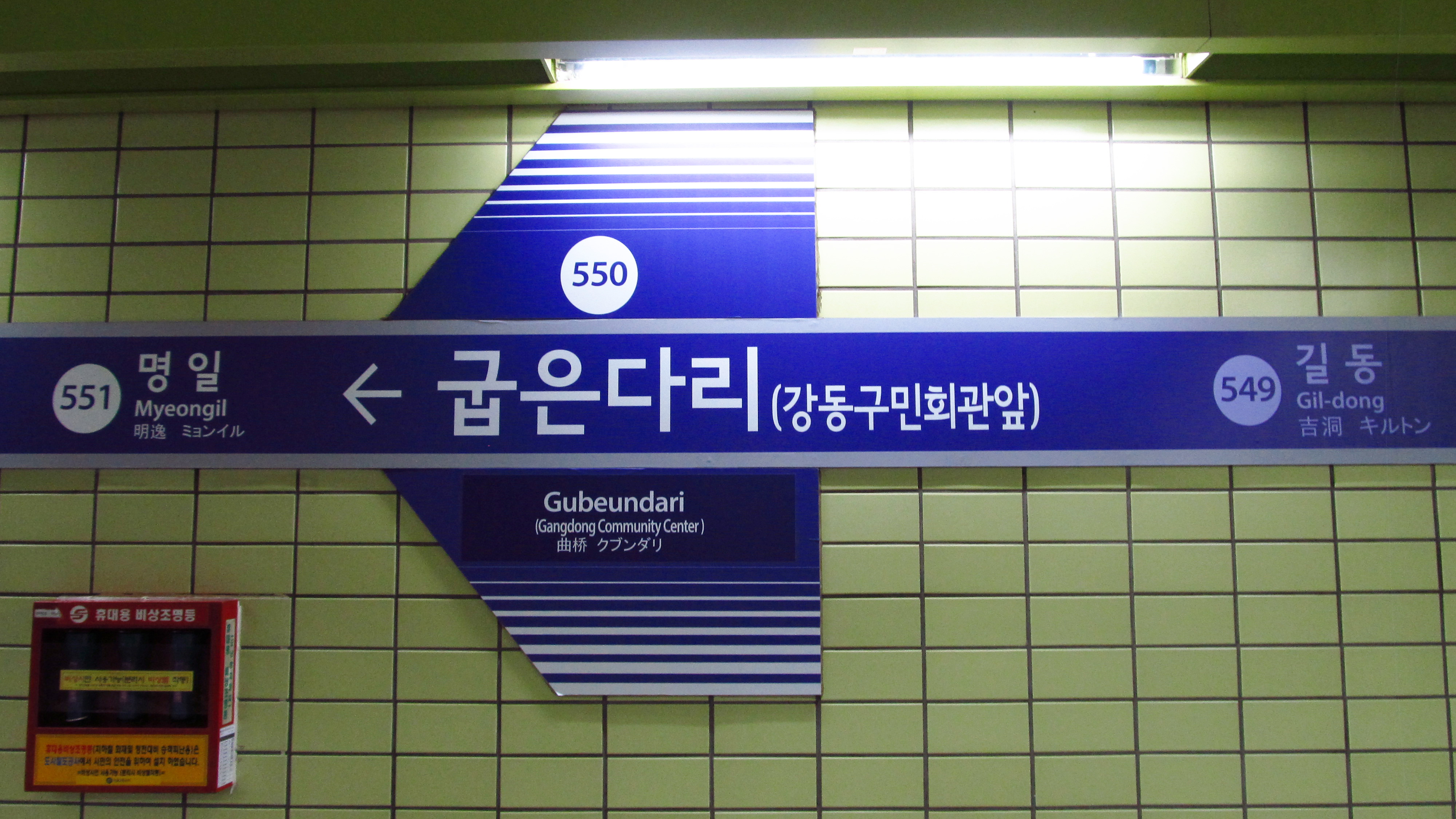
- Station sign

Korean name
- Hangul: 굽은다리역
- Hanja: 굽은다리驛
- Revised Romanization: Gubeundari-yeok
- McCune–Reischauer: Kubŭndari-yŏk

General information
- Location: 1572 Yangjaedaero Jiha, 345-12 Myeongil 1-dong, Gangdong-gu, Seoul
- Operated by: Seoul Metro
- Line: Line 5
- Platforms: 2
- Tracks: 2

Construction
- Structure type: Underground

History
- Opened: November 15, 1995

Services
| Preceding station | Seoul Metropolitan Subway | Following station |
|---|---|---|
| Gil-dong towards Banghwa | Line 5 | Myeongil towards Hanam Geomdansan |
Location

Gubeundari Station is a subway station on Seoul Subway Line 5 in Gangdong District, Seoul.

== Overview ==
The name of Gubeundari literally means Bent Bridge. It is named after the previous name of Gokgyo-ri (곡교리), a village near Cheonho-dong in the era of Joseon Dynasty and now located in Myeongil-dong. Nearby Gubeundari Station, housing complexes such as Jugong Complex 9, Myeongil Hyundai, Myeongil LG, Kumho, Dasung, Samick Garden and Samick Park Apartments are located, as well as Daemyeong Elementary School, Cheonho and Sinmyeong Middle School, Myungsung Presbyterian Church, Gil-dong Catholic Church, Gangdong Community Center, Dongseoul Market and Gandong Branch of the nationwide mega mart Homeplus.

== Station layout ==
| G | Street level | Exit |

| L1; Concourse | Lobby | Customer Service, Shops, Vending machines, ATMs |

| L2; Platforms | Side platform, doors will open on the right |
| L2; Platforms | Westbound | ← Line 5 toward Banghwa (Gil-dong) |
| L2; Platforms | Eastbound | Line 5 toward Hanam Geomdansan (Myeongil)→ |
| L2; Platforms | Side platform, doors will open on the right |
