= Seo Jung-hyun =

South Korean footballer (born 1997)

Personal information
- Date of birth: 10 April 1997 (age 29)
- Place of birth: Pyeongtaek, Gyeonggi, South Korea
- Height: 1.73 m (5 ft 8 in)
- Position: Forward

Youth career
- Pohang Steelers

Senior career*
Years	Team	Apps	(Gls)
2018–2019	Pyeongtaek Citizen		
- * Club domestic league appearances and goals

- Seo Jung-hyun
- Hangul: 서정현
- RR: Seo Jeonghyeon
- MR: Sŏ Chŏnghyŏn

Seo Jung-hyun (Korean: 서정현; born 10 April 1997) is a South Korean former footballer.

== Early life ==
Seo was born in Pyeongtaek, Gyeonggi. He attended the Pohang Jecheol Middle School.

== Club career ==
Seo spent time in the academy of Pohang Steelers from elementary school age. In October 2014, he was named by English newspaper The Guardian as one of the best players born in 1997 worldwide. Following his departure from the Steelers, and his graduation from high school, he was set to sign for an unnamed Belgian club, but this did not materialise as he failed the medical prior to signing. After the collapsed move to Belgium, Seo remained in South Korea, signing with fourth division side Pyeongtaek Citizen for the 2018 season.

== Coaching career ==
After a short spell with Pyeongtaek Citizen, he retired to focus on coaching, and went on to manage the youth sector of the club. He has listed German coach Julian Nagelsmann as his role model in coaching, as the two both retired early from their playing careers to pursue management.

== Style of play ==
Asian sports correspondent John Duerden described Seo as a player with quick feet who is "composed in front of goal with a fierce shot". He also compared him to Japanese international footballer Shinji Kagawa.
