= 719th Military Intelligence Battalion (United States) =

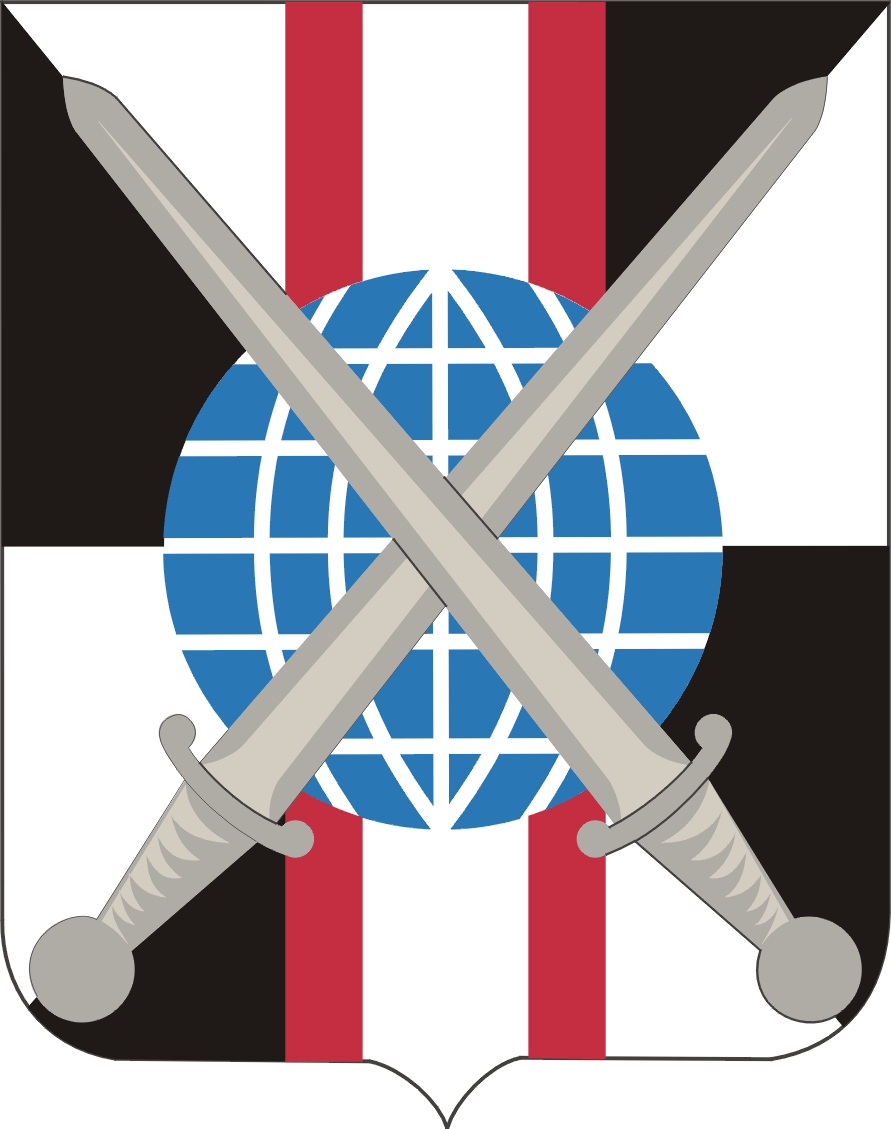
- 719th Military Intelligence Battalion coat of arms
- Active: 16 June 2000-Present
- Country: United States
- Branch: U.S. Army
- Role: Strategic and tactical intelligence support
- Size: 3 companies
- Part of: 501st Military Intelligence Brigade
- Garrison/HQ: Zoeckler Station - Camp Humphreys, South Korea
- Nickname: Silent Warriors
- Motto: Strive for Excellence!
- Colors: Blue, Black
- Mascot: Red Dragon
- Decorations: Army Superior Unit Award

Commanders
- Current commander: LTC Steven P. Patterson

Insignia
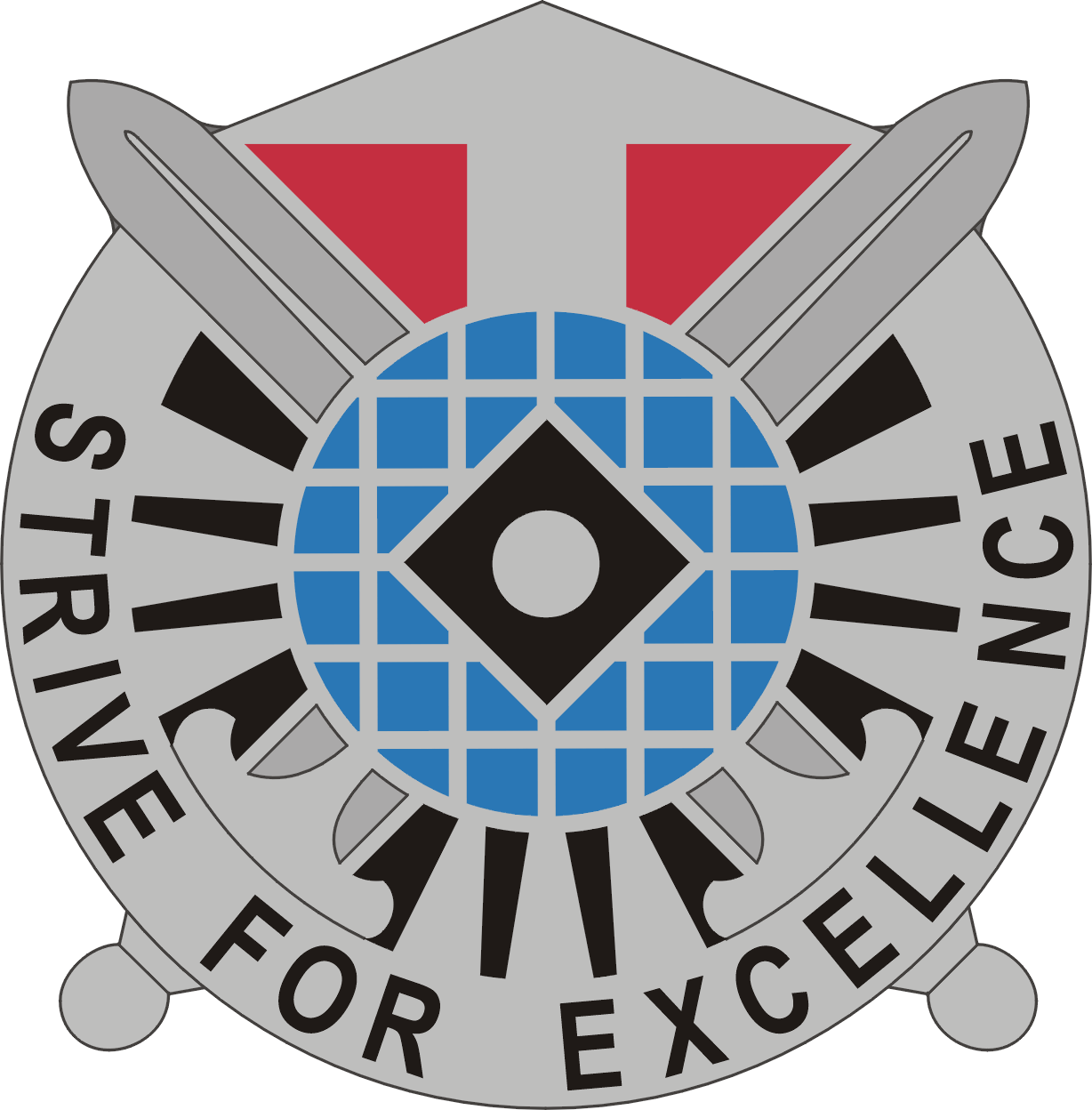
- Distinctive Unit Insignia

The 719th Military Intelligence Battalion ("Silent Warriors"), operates a partial strategic/partial tactical mission. The battalion is located at Zoeckler Station, a sub-installation of Camp Humphreys, Republic of Korea. It is subordinate to the 501st Military Intelligence Brigade and has three subordinate companies, A Co, B Co and HHSC.

== Mission ==
The 719th Military Intelligence Battalion provides strategic and tactical intelligence support to commanders and staff on the Korean peninsula, commands throughout the Pacific, and national consumers. Specifically it is responsible for strategic level SIGINT for 501 Military Intelligence Brigade.

== History ==
The following is a timeline of Field Station Korea's history:

Spring 1960
177th USASA Company moved to Camp Humphreys (then K6) from their operations compound at Mia-Ri (now Mia-Dong) after construction of the K6 subpost was completed.

9 March 1970
As the senior USASA organization in Korea, the 508th USASA Group combined with the 177th USASA Company and were redesignated as USASA Group Korea and moved to Camp Humphreys.

30 September 1971
USASA Field Station Korea and 332nd ASA Operations Company (forward) activated.

April 1977
The Field Station was resubordinated to the newly formed 501st MI Group headquartered in Seoul. At this time, USASA Field Station Korea became U.S. Army Field Station Korea with four subordinate units: Headquarters and Service Company, Operations Company, 332nd ASA Operations Company (transferred to 532nd Military Intelligence Battalion [MI BN] in 1986), and the 146th ASA Aviation Company (subsequently reorganized as 3rd MI BN).

7 January 1988
U.S. Army Field Station Korea was redesignated as 751st MI BN

16 June 2000
751st MI BN was redesignated as the 527th MI BN.

1 October 2009
527th MI BN was redesignated as the 719th MI BN.

== Operations ==
The following is a history of the 527th Military Intelligence Battalion's missions.

1 May 1946
527th Interrogation Team activated for 6 months at Frankfurt, Germany.
February 1948
527th redesignated as a Headquarters and Headquarters Detachment and reactivated at Fort Bragg, North Carolina, in support of the U.S. Third Army.
June 1950-July 1953
The outbreak of the Korean War led to several changes in the unit, ultimately leading to its redesignation as 527th MI Company.
1 June 1962
Activation as the 527th MI CO (Security) at Kaiserslautern, Germany, assigned to 66th Intelligence Corps Group. The mission and structure of the unit continued to change during the Cold War. The unit worked to detect and neutralize hostile intelligence efforts against U.S. forces stationed in its area of operation. Its mission and structure remained basically unchanged for the next 30 years.
November 1989
The unit's mission changed again with the fall of the Berlin Wall. It continued to play an important part in counterintelligence efforts for the Army, including DESERT SHIELD/STORM.

26 July 1992: 527th MI BN (CI) receives Army Superior Unit Award for period of March 1990-March 1991. Posted by Rich Stombaugh. I was there.

October 1997
Unit was inactivated.
16 June 2000
527th MI BN was activated at Camp Humphreys, Korea, and assigned to 501st Military Intelligence Brigade. Running 24-hour operations, 527th Military Intelligence Battalion plays a vital role in providing the vigilance required to insure the security of the Republic of Korea.

== Organization ==
The 719th Military Intelligence Battalion has three subordinate units; Headquarters and Headquarters Service Company, Alpha Company, and Bravo Company.
