= 501st Military Intelligence Brigade (United States) =

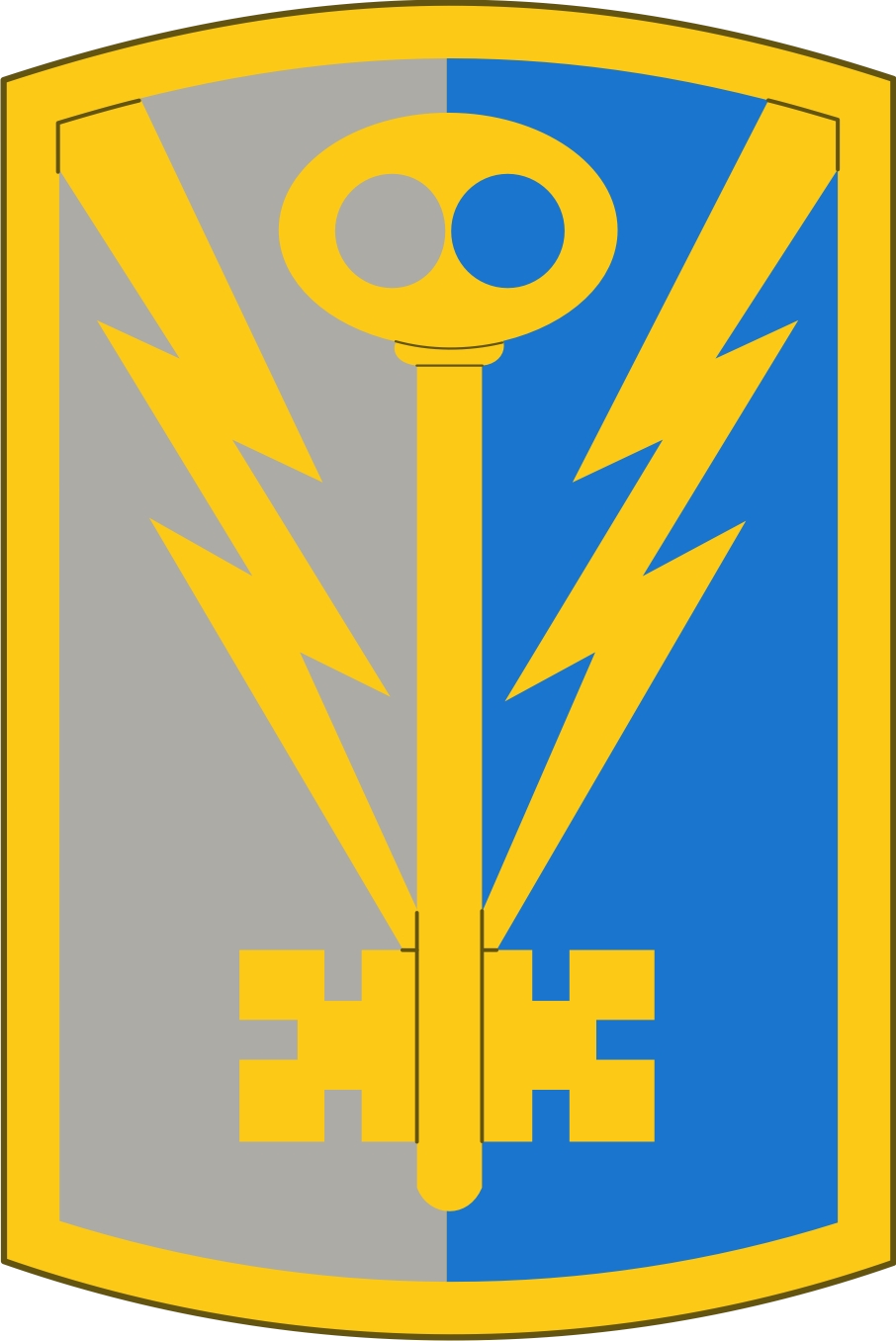
- Shoulder sleeve insignia
- Active: 20 October 1950 - Present
- Country: United States
- Allegiance: United States Army Intelligence and Security Command
- Branch: United States Army
- Type: Combat Support
- Role: Military intelligence
- Size: Brigade
- Part of: Eighth Army (United States)
- Stationed: USAG Humphreys, Republic of Korea
- Nickname: Red Dragons
- Motto: Strike with Fire
- Unit Colors: Red and Black
- Mascot: Red Dragon
- Decorations: ROK Presidential Unit Citation, Meritorious Unit Commendation

Commanders
- Commander: COL Jordon T. Ewers
- Command Sergeant Major: CSM Michael Dawley

Insignia
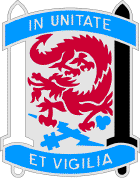
- Distinctive unit insignia of the brigade

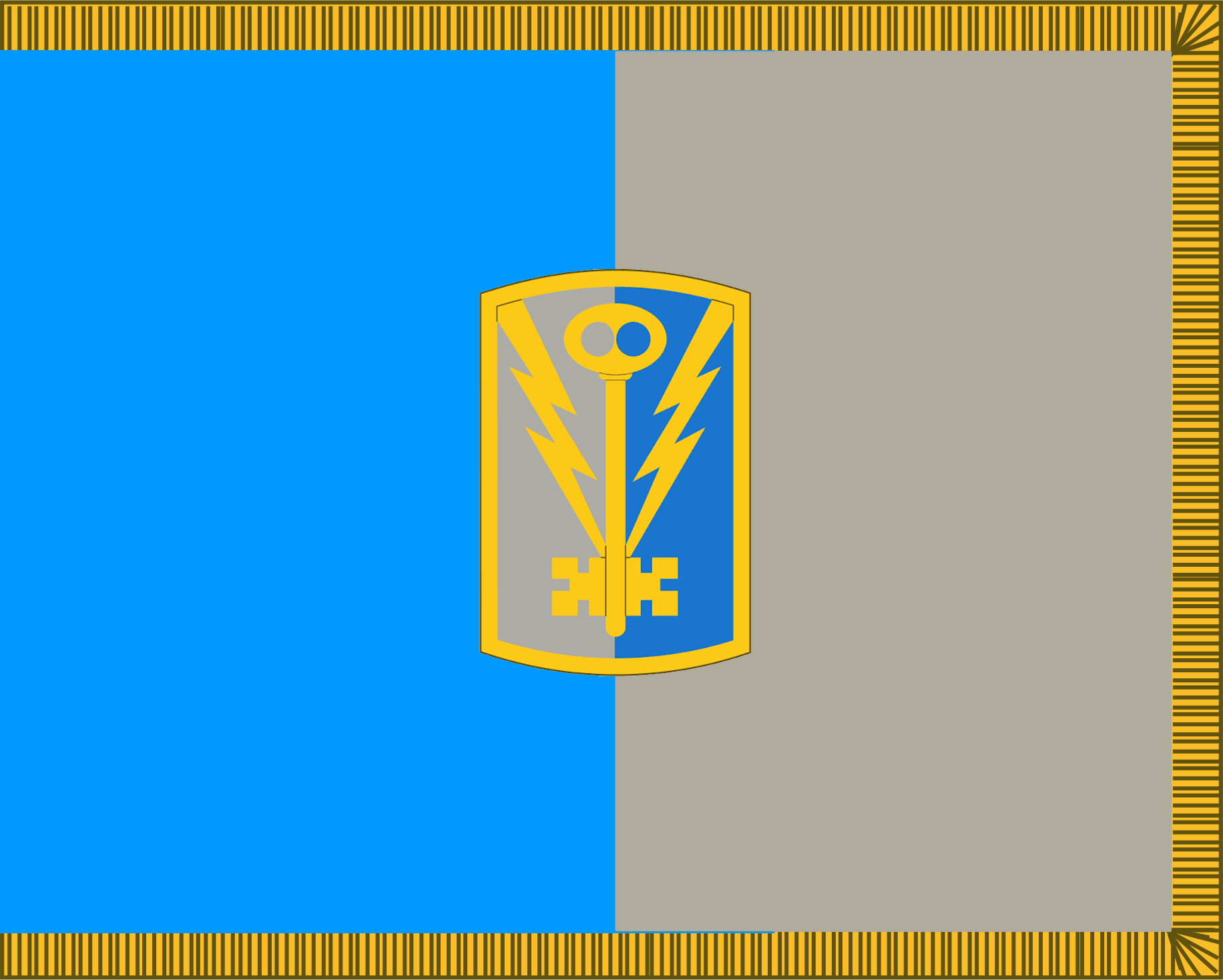
- 501st Military Intelligence Brigade Flag

The 501st Military Intelligence Brigade is a United States Army unit, assigned to the United States Army Intelligence and Security Command (INSCOM) under the operational control of United States Forces Korea (USFK) located in South Korea. The 501st MI Brigade conducts theater level multi-discipline intelligence collection and analysis, aerial Intelligence Surveillance & Reconnaissance (ISR), and security operations in support of Eighth United States Army, U.S. Army Pacific, U.S. Pacific Command, U.S. Forces Korea, and other national level agencies.

== Organization ==
- 501st Military Intelligence Brigade, at Camp Humphreys
  - Headquarters and Headquarters Company, at Camp Humphreys
  - 3rd Military Intelligence Battalion, at Camp Humphreys
  - 368th Military Intelligence Battalion (Reserve), at Parks Reserve Forces Training Area (California)
  - 524th Military Intelligence Battalion, at Camp Humphreys
  - 532nd Military Intelligence Battalion (Operations), at Camp Humphreys
  - 719th Military Intelligence Battalion, at Camp Humphreys

== History ==
Constituted on 13 October 1950 in the regular Army as HHC, 501st Communication Reconnaissance Group, the unit was activated on 20 October 1950 at Camp Pickett, Virginia, and assigned to the Army Security Agency (ASA). On 28 May 1951, the 501st transferred from Camp Pickett to Camp Stoneman, California, for staging to Busan, Korea.

The 501st arrived at Busan on 25 June 1951. The unit spent four days in the Busan assembly area, awaiting sea transportation to Inchon. The 501st arrived at Inchon on 1 July 1951. The Group headquarters moved into the war damaged main building of the Kyonggi Middle School, Seoul, Korea. By 15 July, the 501st had assumed administrative and operational control of all ASA units in Korea.

By the end of hostilities in July 1953, the Group had three battalions and five companies assigned. Beside the numerous citations awarded to its subordinate units, the Group received the Meritorious Unit Commendation (1 July 1951 to 27 July 1953), the Republic of Korea Presidential Unit citation (15 July 1951 to 30 April 1953) and credited for participation in six campaigns.

On 28 January 1956, the 501st Communications Reconnaissance Group was redesignated as HHC, 501st ASA Group. On 1 July 1965, the 501st ASA Group was inactivated and its personnel and mission transferred to the 508th USASA Group, a TDA organization, as part of a worldwide reorganization occurring within ASA to provide greater flexibility in support of tactical units.

On 1 January 1978, HHC, 501st ASA Group was redesignated HHC, 501st Military Intelligence Group and activated at Yongsan, Korea. The Group took place of the temporary 501st MI Group (Provisional), organized at Camp Coiner on 1 April 1977, as part of the major reorganization within Army Intelligence, which merged individuals disciplines into one organization.

On 16 October 1986, the 501st was elevated to Brigade status under the Army of Excellence guidelines.

The 501st Military Intelligence Brigade's 524th Military Intelligence Battalion deployed elements in support of Operation Enduring Freedom in Afghanistan to assist in operations between NATO and Republic of Korea (ROK) Army units. The last of these elements returned in early 2013.

== External links and sources ==
- 501st homepage
- INSCOM home page
