= Godeok station =

Train station in South Korea

고덕 (강동경희대병원); Godeok (Kyung Hee Univ. Hospital at Gangdong)
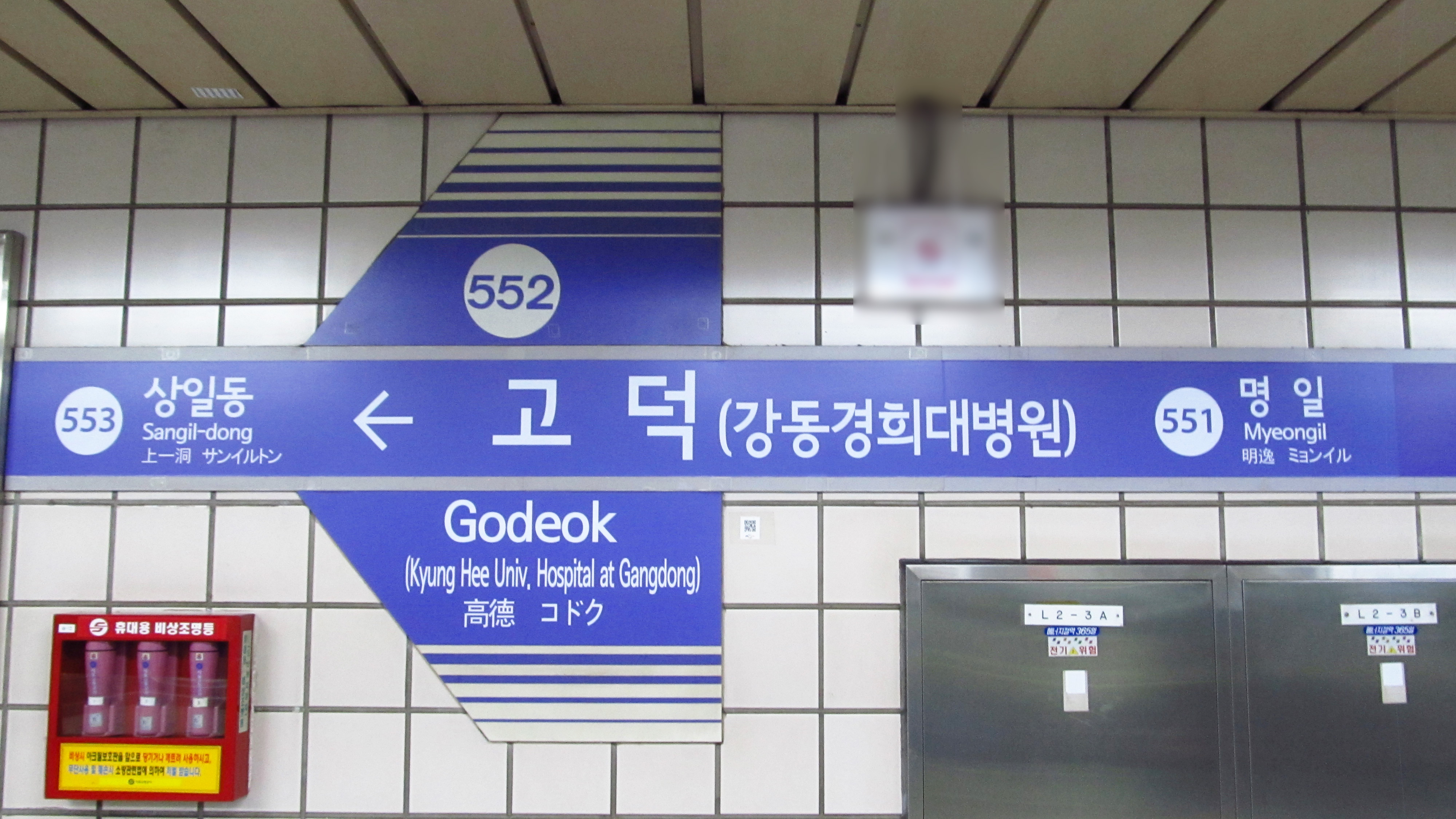

Korean name
- Hangul: 고덕역
- Hanja: 高德驛
- Revised Romanization: Godeongnyeok
- McCune–Reischauer: Kodŏngnyŏk

General information
- Location: 310 Godeok-dong, Gangdong-gu, Seoul
- Coordinates: 37°33′18″N 127°09′15″E
- Operated by: Seoul Metro
- Line: Line 5
- Platforms: 2
- Tracks: 2

Construction
- Structure type: Underground

History
- Opened: November 15, 1995

Services
Preceding station	Seoul Metropolitan Subway	Following station
Myeongil towards Banghwa	Line 5	Sangil-dong towards Hanam Geomdansan
Location

Godeok Station is a subway station on Seoul Subway Line 5 in Gangdong District, Seoul. It links to Baejae High School, Myungil High School, Gwangmun High School, Hanyoung High School, and Hanyoung Foreign Language High School. It will be part of Seoul Subway Line 9 in 2028.

== Station layout ==
G	Street level	Exit

L1; Concourse	Lobby	Customer Service, Shops, Vending machines, ATMs

L2; Platforms	Side platform, doors will open on the right
L2; Platforms	Westbound	← Line 5 toward Banghwa (Myeongil)
L2; Platforms	Eastbound	Line 5 toward Hanam Geomdansan (Sangil-dong)→
L2; Platforms	Side platform, doors will open on the right
