= Hankwang High School =

- 504 Bijeon-dong, 115 Jungang 1-ro, Pyeongtaek, Gyeonggi; South Korea

Information
- Established: 9 January 1963
- Website: hkh.hs.kr

Hankwang High School is a preparatory normal high school, located in Pyeongtaek city, Gyeonggi Province, South Korea. It was founded in 1955. The motto of the school is: Hold big dreams in your mind, And be loyal to the small things around you.

== Objectives ==
Motto stone

The school aims:

- To provide students who are responsible and working hard
- To provide students who think reasonably and positively
- To provide students who have healthy body, and constructive and brave mind
- To provide students who are sociable and love neighbors, serve to our society

== History ==
- March 24, 1955 : Ministry of Education approved the establishment of the Hankwang educational foundation
- January 9, 1963 : Ministry of Education approved the establishment Hankwang high school as a coeducational school consisting of six classes
- March 1, 1963 : First Principal Hong sung-young was appointed
- January 5, 1968 : The coeducational school system was separated into Hankwang boy's high school and Hankwanh girl's high school
- August 30, 1980 : Class numbers are extended to 30
- May 17, 2010 : School yard improvement construction was completed
- As of 2010, 15,820 students have been graduated
