= Pyeongtaek =

City in Gyeonggi, South Korea

Coordinates: 36°59′32″N 127°06′46″E

- Municipal City
- Panoramic view of Pyeongtaek

- Flag Logo

- Location in South Korea
- Country: South Korea
- Region: Gyeonggi Province (Sudogwon)
- Administrative divisions: 4 eup, 5 myeon, 13 dong

Area
  - Total: 452.31 km^{2} (174.64 sq mi)

Population (2026)
  - Total: 667,780
  - Density: 1,476/km^{2} (3,820/sq mi)
  - Dialect: Gyeonggi
- Demonym(s): 평택시민 (Pyeongtaek-simin), Pyeongtaeker

Korean name
- Hangul: 평택시
- Hanja: 平澤市
- RR: Pyeongtaek-si
- MR: P'yŏngt'aek-si

Pyeongtaek (Korean: 평택; Korean pronunciation: [pʰjʌŋ.tʰɛk̚]) is a city in Gyeonggi Province, South Korea. Located in the southwestern part of the province, Pyeongtaek was founded as a union of two districts in 1940. It was elevated to city status in 1986 and is home to a South Korean naval base and a large concentration of United States troops. The South Korean government plans to transform Pyeongtaek into an international economic hub to coincide with the move of United States Forces Korea (USFK) to Pyeongtaek. During the Korean War, it was the site of the Battle of Pyongtaek, an early battle between U.S. and North Korean forces. It is also the location of Pyeongtaek University.

== History ==
- During the Joseon Dynasty, the eastern part of present-day Pyeongtaek (the eastern areas of Pyeongtaek and Songtan city, as well as Jinwi, Seotan, and Godeok-myeon) was part of Chungcheongdo Jinwi County (Jinwi-gun), while the western part (Pohseong, Anjung-eup, and Cheongbuk, Oseong, and Hyeondeok-myeon) was part of Suwon-yusu (Suwon-gun) in Gyeonggi-do. Some parts of the current Paengseong-eup and the southern part of Godeok-myeon were part of Chungcheongdo Pyeongtaek County (Pyeongtaek-gun).
- June 23, 1895 (lunar May 1): With the implementation of the 23 districts system, Chungcheongdo Jinwi County and Pyeongtaek County were incorporated into Gongju Bu, and Suwon County in Gyeonggi-do was incorporated into Incheon Bu.
- August 4, 1896: With the implementation of the 13 provinces system, Jinwi County in Gongju Bu and Suwon County in Incheon Bu were incorporated into Gyeonggi-do, while Pyeongtaek County in Gongju Bu was incorporated into Chungcheongnam-do.
- April 1, 1914: Gyeonggi-do Jinwi County was reorganized, incorporating parts of Gyeonggi-do Suwon County and Chungcheongnam-do Pyeongtaek County to form the newly organized Gyeonggi-do Jinwi County. (11 districts)

Administrative districts at the time	North-myeon, Seotan-myeon, Songtan-myeon, Godeok-myeon, Byeongnam-myeon, Cheongbuk-myeon, Pohseong-myeon, Hyeondeok-myeon, Oseong-myeon, Buyong-myeon, Seo-myeon

- 1926: The Jinwi County office was moved from North-myeon to Byeongnam-myeon.
- April 1, 1931: Byeongnam-myeon was renamed Pyeongtaek-myeon.
- April 1, 1934: Buyong-myeon and Seo-myeon merged to form Paengseong-myeon. (10 districts)
- October 1, 1938: Jinwi County was renamed Pyeongtaek County. Pyeongtaek-myeon was promoted to Pyeongtaek-eup. (1 town, 9 districts)
- August 1, 1948: North-myeon was renamed Jinwi-myeon.
- January 1, 1963: Songtan-myeon was promoted to Songtan-eup. (2 towns, 8 districts)
- May 1, 1979: Paengseong-myeon was promoted to Paengseong-eup. (3 towns, 7 districts)
- July 1, 1981: Songtan-eup was promoted to Songtan City and separated from Pyeongtaek County. (Pyeongtaek County: 2 towns, 7 districts; Songtan City: 8 districts)
- February 15, 1983: Parts of Anseong County's Wongok-myeon (Yongi-ri, Jukbaek-ri, Cheongyong-ri, Wolgok-ri) and Gongdo-myeon (Sosari) were incorporated into Pyeongtaek-eup without consultation with the residents.
- February 15, 1983: Likewise, parts of Yongin County's Namsa-myeon (Jinmok-ri and Bongmyeong-ri) were incorporated into Pyeongtaek City without consultation with the residents.
- January 1, 1986: Pyeongtaek-eup was promoted to Pyeongtaek City and separated from Pyeongtaek County. (Pyeongtaek County: 1 town, 7 districts; Songtan City: 8 districts; Pyeongtaek City: 6 districts)
- January 1, 1987: Parts of Hwaseong County’s Yanggam-myeon (Goryeom-ri) were incorporated into Pyeongtaek City without consulting the residents.
- July 1, 1987: The Anjung branch office was established (the Pyeongtaek County office was located within the Pyeongtaek City area at the time).
- April 1, 1989: The jurisdiction of the Anjung branch office was upgraded to Anjung-myeon.
- April 20, 1995: Parts of Jinwi-myeon (Galgot-ri, Goheon-ri, Cheongho-ri) were incorporated into Osan.
- May 10, 1995: Songtan City, Pyeongtaek City, and Pyeongtaek County merged to form Pyeongtaek City as a metropolitan city. (1 town, 8 districts, 14 districts)
- April 19, 1996: Dongbu-dong was renamed Songtan-dong.
- October 1, 1998: Dowon-dong was merged into Songtan-dong. (1 town, 8 districts, 13 districts)
- November 5, 2002: Anjung-myeon was promoted to Anjung-eup. (2 towns, 7 districts, 13 districts)
- December 29, 2006: Pohseong-myeon was promoted to Pohseong-eup. (3 towns, 6 districts, 13 districts)
- July 28, 2016: Cheongbuk-myeon was promoted to Cheongbuk-eup. (4 towns, 5 districts, 13 districts)
- April 11, 2019: The population of Pyeongtaek City exceeded 500,000.
- September 30, 2019: Yongi-dong was split into Yongi-dong and Songtan-dong. (4 towns, 5 districts, 14 districts)
- October 25, 2021: Dongnak-dong was split into Dongnak-dong and Godeok-dong. (4 towns, 5 districts, 15 districts)
- November 15, 2021: Godeok-myeon's Yeom-ri, Yulpo-ri, Jwagyori, and Haechang-ri were changed to Godeok-dong. (4 towns, 5 districts, 16 districts)

== Military base ==
Osan Air Base is located in Songtan, a district in Pyeongtaek.

The South Korean and U.S. governments came to an agreement to enlarge Camp Humphreys—a U.S. Army installation outside Anjeong-ri, a community in Pyeongtaek—and move the majority of U.S. forces stationed in and north of Seoul to Camp Humphreys. Invoking eminent domain, the government obtained the surrounding land for the base expansion. This resulted in the community's third displacement from their land since the Japanese occupation during World War II.

The move initially included the headquarters of the ROK/US Combined Forces Command, which has operational control of South Korean, U.S., and U.N. combined forces during wartime. In March 2007, South Korean defense minister Kim Jang-soo and U.S. defense secretary Robert Gates agreed to dissolve the ROK/U.S. Combined Forces Command on April 17, 2012. This allowed South Korean forces to have wartime control of their military during a military confrontation with North Korea. The ROK/US agreement allowed the U.S. military to move to one centralized location away from the congestion of Seoul and its surrounding areas. This relocation agreement returned two-thirds of the land used by the U.S. military back to the South Korean government. By 2008, the U.S. military consolidated 41 installations down to 10 under the relocation agreement. USFK's only jail facility in South Korea is at Camp Humphreys.

=== South African War Memorial ===
The Korean War Monument of the South African Air Force was opened on 29 September 1975 by the South Korea Ministry of National Defense in memory of the 37 South African Air Force members who served during the Korean War.

== Education ==
- Hankwang High School
- Pyeongtaek University
- Pyeongtaek High School
- Kookje University
- Pyeongtaek International Christian School (평택크리스천외국인학교)

== Climate ==
Pyeongtaek has a humid continental climate (Köppen: Dwa) but can be considered a borderline humid subtropical climate (Köppen: Cwa) using the −3 °C (27 °F) isotherm.

With its low average elevation, Pyeongtaek has the warmest January average temperature in Gyeonggi Province at -4.5°C and the hottest average temperature in August at 26.4°C. The annual average precipitation is 1,100 millimeters with an average of 283.4 millimeters in July and 207.3 millimeters in August, the lowest in the province. This is due to the relatively low occurrence of orographic rainfall compared to other regions.

Climate data for Pyeongtaek (1993–2020 normals)
Month	Jan	Feb	Mar	Apr	May	Jun	Jul	Aug	Sep	Oct	Nov	Dec	Year
Mean daily maximum °C (°F)	2.7 (36.9)	5.8 (42.4)	11.8 (53.2)	18.7 (65.7)	24.5 (76.1)	28.3 (82.9)	30.2 (86.4)	31.1 (88.0)	27.0 (80.6)	21.0 (69.8)	12.7 (54.9)	4.8 (40.6)	18.2 (64.8)
Daily mean °C (°F)	−2.0 (28.4)	0.7 (33.3)	5.9 (42.6)	12.5 (54.5)	18.4 (65.1)	22.8 (73.0)	25.7 (78.3)	26.2 (79.2)	21.6 (70.9)	14.9 (58.8)	7.6 (45.7)	0.3 (32.5)	12.9 (55.2)
Mean daily minimum °C (°F)	−6.7 (19.9)	−4.3 (24.3)	0.3 (32.5)	6.3 (43.3)	12.8 (55.0)	18.3 (64.9)	22.2 (72.0)	22.6 (72.7)	17.1 (62.8)	9.3 (48.7)	2.2 (36.0)	−4.5 (23.9)	8.0 (46.4)
Average precipitation mm (inches)	17.5 (0.69)	25.0 (0.98)	33.1 (1.30)	65.8 (2.59)	77.6 (3.06)	109.5 (4.31)	300.6 (11.83)	257.1 (10.12)	139.4 (5.49)	53.6 (2.11)	44.3 (1.74)	20.8 (0.82)	1,144.3 (45.05)
Average precipitation days (≥ 0.1 mm)	3.9	4.0	5.3	6.6	6.8	7.0	12.6	11.5	7.7	5.4	7.5	5.6	83.9
Source: Korea Meteorological Administration

== Notable people ==
- Lee Eun-gyeol, a Korean magician and illusionist
- Wŏn Kyun, a military general of the mid-Joseon dynasty who served during the Imjin War
- Park Wan-kyu, a rock singer
- Ye Soo-jung, an award-winning stage actress

== Notes ==
1. U.S. Move Is Spurring Evictions In S. Korea (Washington Post article)
2. Massive Force Mobilized to Evict U.S. Base Protestors (Chosun Ilbo article (English))
3. Activists Are Only Using the People of Pyeontaek (Chosun Ilbo English Editorial) article
4. More Violence Looms in Planned Rally at U.S. Base Site
5. U.S. base expansion in Korea sparks protests (Socialism and Liberation) article

== See also ==
- Camp Humphreys
- Songtan
- USFK
- List of cities in South Korea
- Geography of South Korea
