= Godeok-dong =

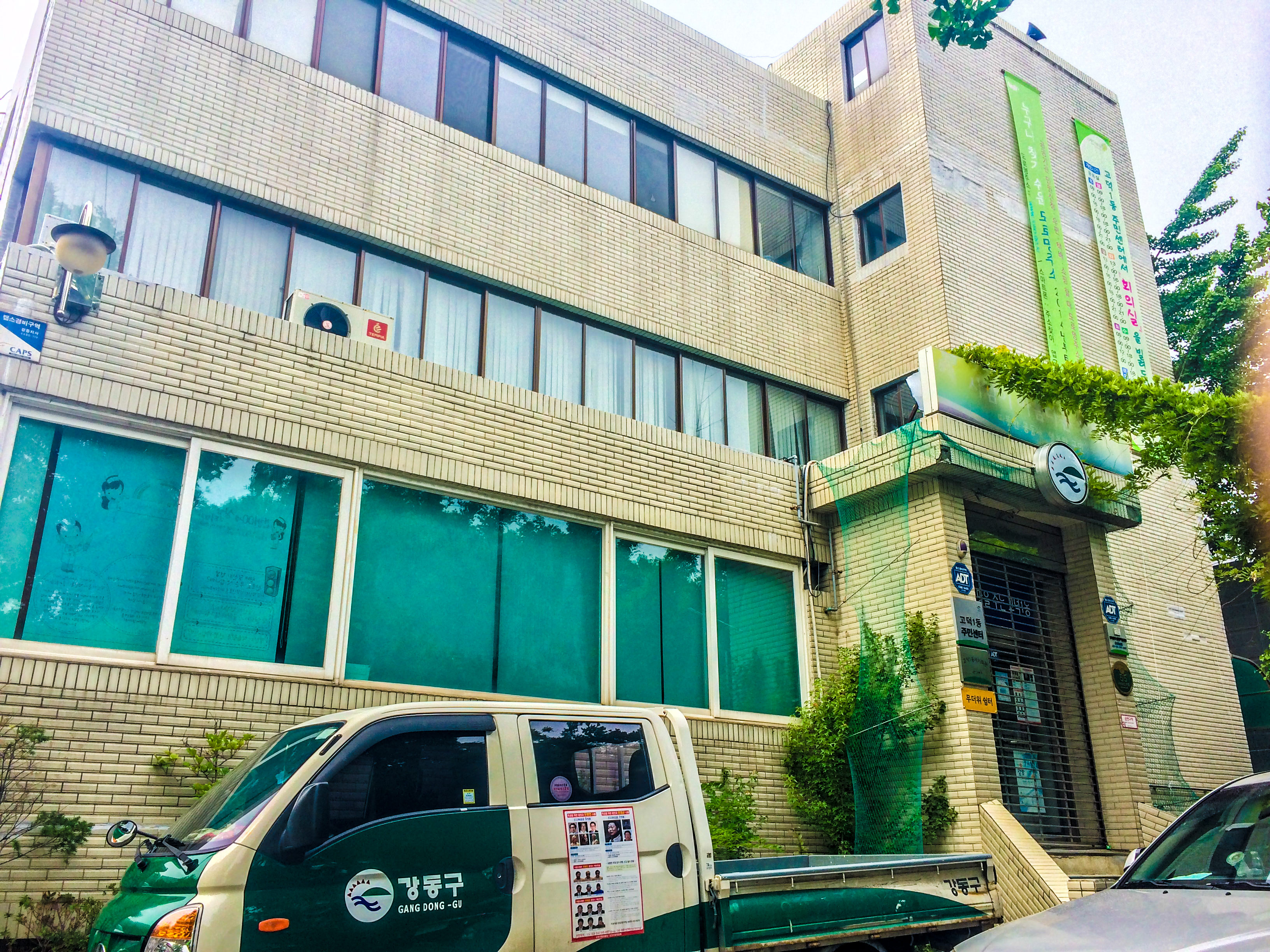
- Godeok 1(il)-dong Community Service Center (Gangdong-gu)
- Country: South Korea

Area
  - Total: 3.75 km^{2} (1.45 sq mi)

Population (2001)
  - Total: 50,147
  - Density: 13,373/km^{2} (34,640/sq mi)

Korean name
- Hangul: 고덕동
- Hanja: 高德洞
- RR: Godeok-dong
- MR: Kodŏk-tong

Godeok-dong (Korean: 고덕동) is a dong (neighborhood) of Gangdong District, Seoul, South Korea.

== History ==
Godeok means "high virtue" in Korean. During the Late 14th century, Yangjung Lee, a public officer of the Goryeo period, strongly rejected a conciliatory offer to turn into Joseon dynasty, a new regime after the Goryeo dynasty. Due to his high loyalty to his government, he was admired by the general public and they called his residential area "Godeok". In 1995, Seoul Subway Line 5 was passed through this area stopping at Godeok Station and Myeongil Station.

== Area information ==
The postal code of Godeok-dong is 134-080. 134 is for Gangdong District and 080 is for Godeok-dong.

== See also ==
- Administrative divisions of Seoul
- Administrative divisions of South Korea
