= Paengseong =

Place in South Korea

Coordinates: 36°57′41″N 127°02′38″E

- Panoramic view of Paengseong

Korean name
- Hangul: 팽성읍
- Hanja: 彭城邑
- RR: Paengseong-eup
- MR: P'aengsŏng-ŭp

Paengseong-eup (Korean: 팽성읍) is a military town situated in Pyeongtaek, Gyeonggi Province, South Korea, by the Anseongcheon River. A U.S. military base, Camp Humphreys, is located there. The town hall is located in Gaeksa-ri.

== History ==
Until 1914, the area including Godeok-myeon was partially in South Chungcheong Province and later was incorporated into Jinwi-gun and later Pyeongtaek, which are in Gyeonggi-do.
