= Myeongil station =

Train station in South Korea

Coordinates: 37°33′05″N 127°08′38″E

명일; Myeongil
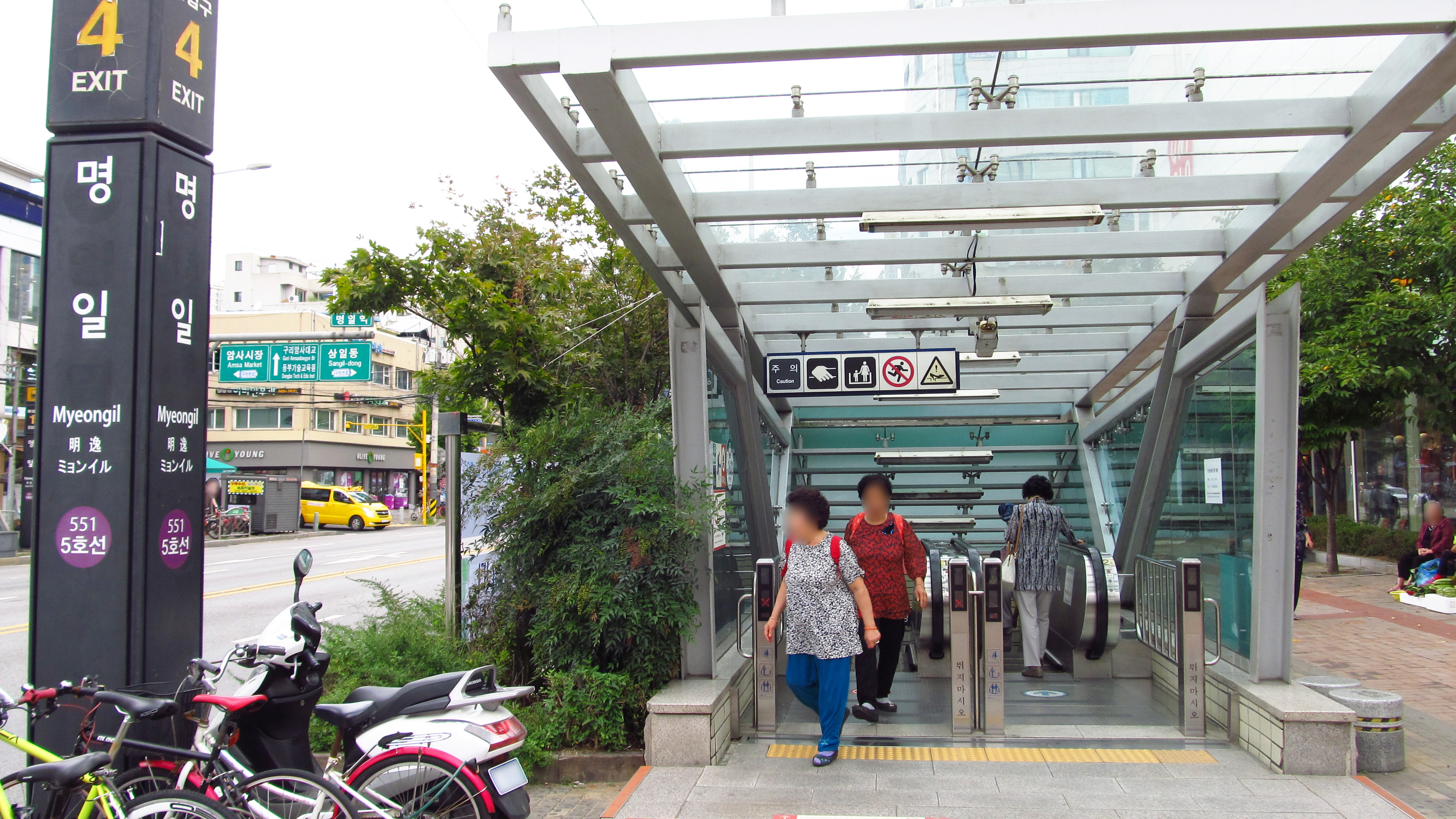
- Exit No.4

Korean name
- Hangul: 명일역
- Hanja: 明逸驛
- Revised Romanization: Myeong-il-yeok
- McCune–Reischauer: Myŏngil-yŏk

General information
- Location: 1632 Yangjaedaero Jiha, 303-1 Myeongil-dong, Gangdong-gu, Seoul
- Operator: Seoul Metro
- Line: Line 5
- Platforms: 2
- Tracks: 2

Construction
- Structure type: Underground

History
- Opened: November 15, 1995

Services
Preceding station	Seoul Metropolitan Subway	Following station
Gubeundari towards Banghwa	Line 5	Godeok towards Hanam Geomdansan
Location

Myeongil Station is a subway station on Seoul Subway Line 5 in Gangdong-gu, Seoul.

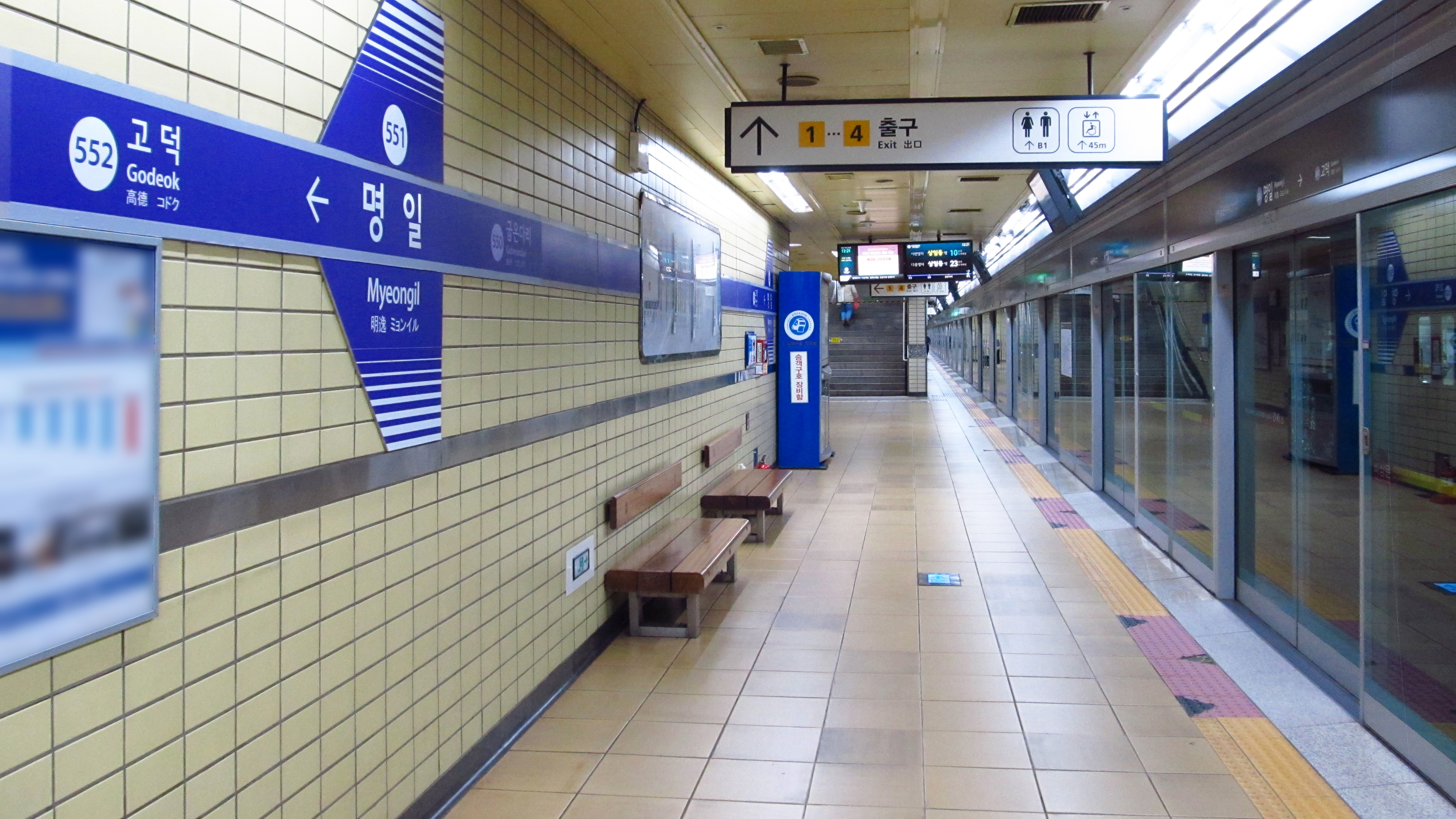
Platform

== Station layout ==
G	Street level	Exit

L1; Concourse	Lobby	Customer Service, Shops, Vending machines, ATMs

L2; Platforms	Side platform, doors will open on the right
L2; Platforms	Westbound	← Line 5 toward Banghwa (Gubeundari)
L2; Platforms	Eastbound	Line 5 toward Hanam Geomdansan (Godeok)→
L2; Platforms	Side platform, doors will open on the right
