= Myungsung Presbyterian Church =

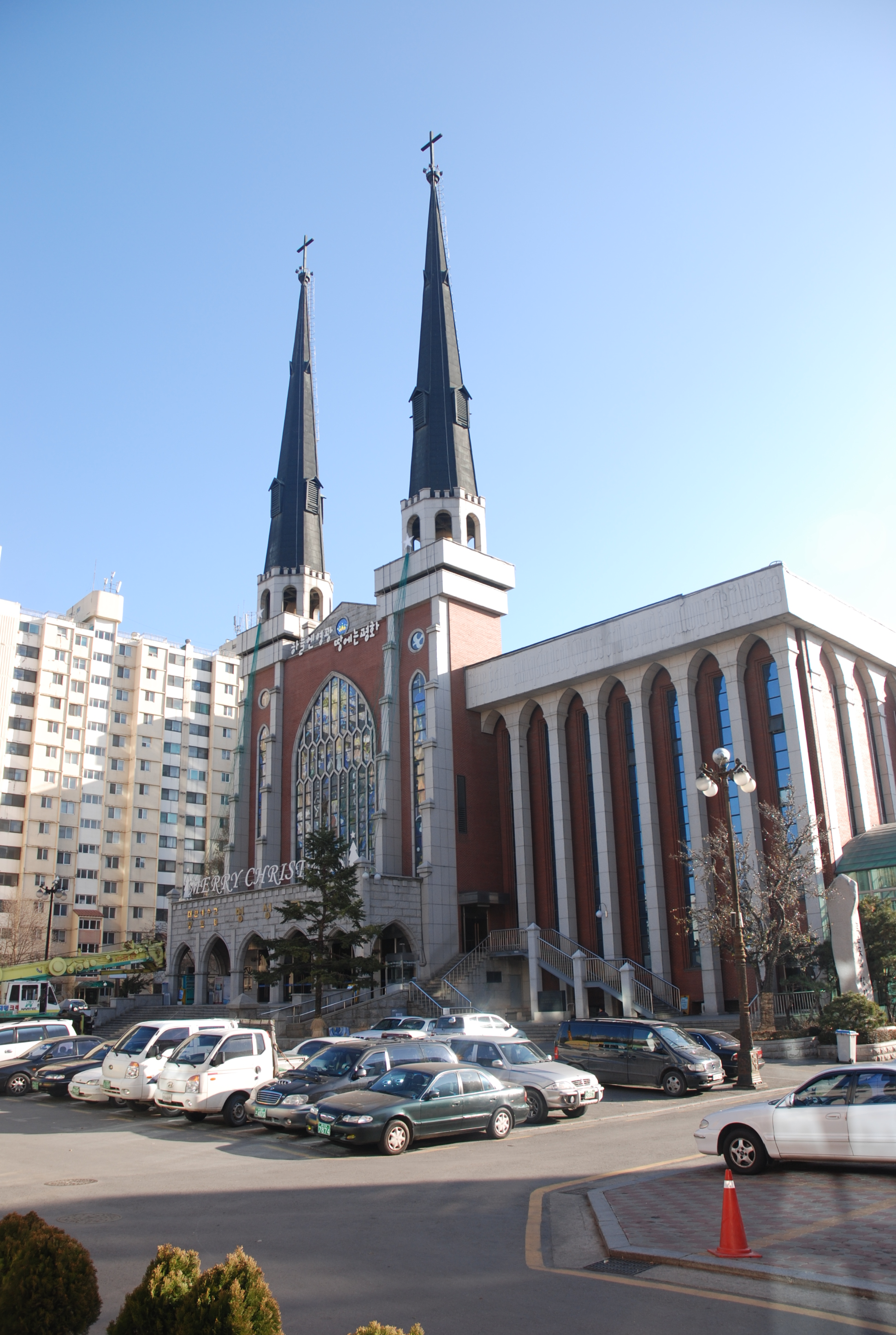
- The church in 2008
- Myungsung Presbyterian Church
- Country: South Korea
- Denomination: Presbyterian
- Website: http://www.msch.or.kr

History
- Status: Megachurch
- Founded: 1980

Architecture
- Functional status: Active
- Style: Modern

- Myungsung Presbyterian Church
- Hangul: 명성교회
- Hanja: 明聲敎會
- Revised Romanization: Myeongseong Gyohoe
- McCune–Reischauer: Myŏngsŏng Kyohoe

Myung Sung Presbyterian Church is the largest Presbyterian church in the world. It is located in Myung-il-dong, Seoul, South Korea, with its Prayer Sanctuary in Wonju. Myung Sung Presbyterian Church has over thirty church plants, including Myung Sung First Presbyterian Church, founded in 2004, and Myung Sung Second Presbyterian Church, founded in 2006. There are an additional ten "screen" (video) churches. The current senior pastor of the church is Pastor Kim Ha Na, and Dr. Kim Sam Whan has become the emeritus pastor.

== History ==
Myungsung literally means "Voice (Sung in Korean) of Myungil-dong" (now Myeongil-dong). The church was founded in 1980. Because there were many farms and orchards around the church, it had been renovated and developed into a huge housing complex by the mid 1980s. In 1989, Myungsung Presbyterian Church was rebuilt on its current site, with a scale of almost 8754 m². In 1990, the senior pastor, Kim Sam Whan, from Myungsung Church visited the Soviet Union (now Russia), and Poland for worship missions, as the first among the Protestant pastors in South Korea. In 2004, the church opened its affiliated hospital named MCM (Myungsung Christian Medical Center) in Addis Ababa, Ethiopia, to serve untreated local people there. In 2012, a new main sanctuary was built beside the former building.

The church mottos are "Lord Only" and "Seven Year as One Day".

== Ministries of the church ==
=== Myeongseong Eunpa (恩波) Forum ===
Myeongseong Church held its first Eunpa Forum to celebrate Pastor Kim Sam-hwan's 60 years of ministry. Experts from various fields discussed the church's social contributions in education, healthcare, and social work, and explored future directions. Pastor Kim Ha-na emphasized the forum's role in adapting the church's ministry to meet contemporary needs.

== Mission Department ==
As of 2006 the Myungsung Mission Department has been able to support 56 nations through 92 families and 172 missionaries. Myungsung Church also supports small churches, schools, hospitals, community centers, and future leaders.

== Controversies ==
=== Controversy Over Church Dynastic Succession ===
The succession controversy at Myeongseong Church began in 2017 when the founding pastor's son, Rev. Kim Hana, was appointed as the successor. This sparked significant backlash within the Christian community and beyond. Although the Presbyterian Church of Korea (TongHap) initially validated the appointment, the decision was later overturned by the General Assembly, which replaced its court members. However, a settlement allowed Rev. Kim Hana to assume leadership in 2021. The issue was ultimately resolved in March 2023 when the Korean Supreme Court ruled in favor of Myeongseong Church, dismissing a lawsuit challenging his leadership.

As a result, a statement calling for the abolition of the ineffective church inheritance prevention law in the Presbyterian Church of Korea (TongHap) was released, sparking significant opposition within the denomination regarding the issue.

=== Recording Reveals Elder Pastor Kim Knew of Affair Allegations ===
A recording has been released revealing that Elder Pastor Kim Sam-hwan of Megacity Church was aware of the affair allegations against Pastor Kim Eui-sik, the General Assembly President of the Presbyterian Church in Korea (Tonghap). In the recording, Elder Pastor Kim is heard encouraging preparations for the General Assembly while stating that they should support Pastor Kim Eui-sik.

=== Controversy over the legitimacy of the pastoral appointment at gwangju myeongseong church ===
In 2008, Rev. Yoo Kyung-jong was appointed as the senior pastor of Gwangju Myeongseong Church. Due to the absence of elders, his role automatically transitioned to that of head pastor in April 2010. However, as no elders were subsequently appointed and no request for his reappointment was made, he was classified as a pastor without a congregation (*muim moksa*) by the presbytery in April 2013. This status raised legal issues, as it led to his disqualification and loss of official pastoral authority.
