= Hanyoung Foreign Language High School =

High school in Seoul, South Korea

Coordinates: 37°32′53″N 127°09′26″E

- 한영외국어고등학교
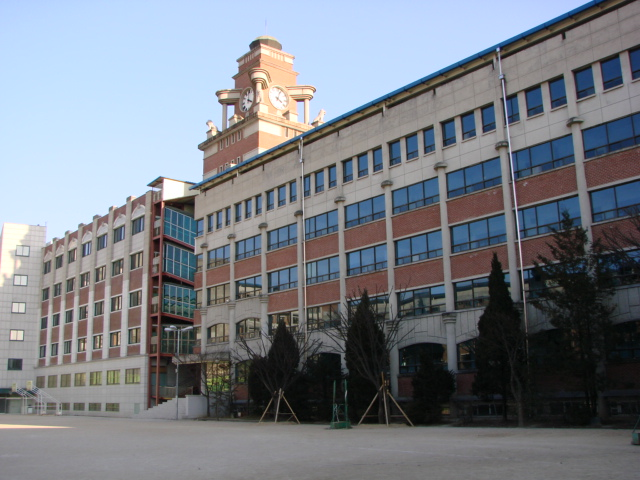
- Gangdong District, Seoul; Korea, Republic of

Information
- Type: Private, Coeducational
- Motto: 성실한 인간이 되자, 노력으로 실력을 기르자 (Let us become diligent people; let us improve ourselves through hard work)
- Established: 1990
- Principal: 육광희
- Faculty: approx. 75
- Enrollment: approx. 1,050
- Student to teacher ratio: 14:1
- Website: http://hyfl.sen.hs.kr

- Hanyoung Foreign Language High School
- Hangul: 한영외국어고등학교
- Hanja: 漢榮外國語高等學校
- RR: Hanyeong oegugeo godeunghakgyo
- MR: Hanyŏng oegugŏ kodŭnghakkyo

Hanyoung Foreign Language High School (Korean: 한영외국어고등학교) is a high school in South Korea. Located in southeast Seoul, South Korea, the medium-sized college preparatory school was founded in 1990.

== Academics ==
Students study 13-15 subjects every year, with one to four hours of classes in each subject weekly. Subjects offered include Korean, English, modern languages (Chinese, German, French, Japanese, and Spanish), ethics, Korean history, world history, government and politics, economic geography, music, art, physical education, computer science, mathematics, and science. Grades are determined by written examinations. The primary language of instruction is Korean and English (with a further specialization in major languages).

=== Admissions ===
The school draws its students from Seoul and areas which do not have a foreign language high school. Most students gain admission by a process called "Regular Decision". Students apply online and offline, turning in their essays and transcripts to the school usually around November. Then, the school evaluates the students based on their middle school English grades and makes the first cuts. Once making the cut, students undergo an interview through which the school selects its final population.

=== Foreign-language education ===
All students must choose a major to study during their years at the school prior to applying. Those offered are Mandarin Chinese, German, French, Japanese, Spanish and. Nearly one third of all instructional hours are spent on foreign-language instruction, in accordance with Korean Ministry of Education guidelines.

In addition to the main language classes, which generally emphasize reading and grammar, students practice conversation in small groups with faculty who are native speakers of each language.

=== Overseas Study Program (OSP) ===
Hanyoung Foreign Language High School has a specialized program for students preparing for matriculation at overseas universities. Students who enroll in the Overseas Study Program take additional courses to prepare for college admissions abroad. This programme has its own faculty and offers SAT and Advanced Placement classes, as well as critical reading, debate, and philosophy courses. It also offers other subjects provided that more than five students are interested in each.

== Student life ==
=== Schedule ===
The average school day runs from 7:40am to 10pm, with seven to nine hours of classes during the day and three to five hours of selective study hall in the evenings. Students take up to eight classes of a foreign language a week, based on their respective departments. Classes last 50 minutes, and are followed by ten minutes of break. Lunch and supper are both served in the school cafeteria, lasting 70 minutes, from 11:50am to 1:00pm and 5:40pm to 7:50pm, respectively.

Hanyoung starts its school year in March and its second semester in August. The school year ends in February, as for most schools in Korea.

=== Extracurricular activities ===
There are more than 30 student clubs at Hanyoung, including, but not limited to:

- HYDIOS (Debate)
- KIMC (Model United Nations)
- AEOS (Volunteer Work)
- YUPI (Video Production)
- HYMES (English Newspaper)
- M&E (Economics)
- HI (Debate)
- JURA (Law & Legislation)
- Dova (Volunteer Work)
- HBS (Hanyoung Broadcasting System)
- HCO (Hanyoung Chamber Orchestra)
- HOF (Debate)
- HFE (Hanyoung Foreign Language Editorial)
- HNM (School Newspaper)
- AHA (Advertisement)
- Motiv (Photography)
- O2(Band)
- 書信 (Literary Magazine)
- 얼씨구나 (Samulnori team)
- Lacrosse
- VANK (Foreign Relations)
- CARE (Human Rights)
- SHO (Performing Arts)

Unlike most academic high schools in Korea, Hanyoung Foreign Language High School does have varsity sports teams for sports including softball, baseball and lacrosse, although they are limited to students of OSP. Other students can participate in intramural teams during the annual sports festival, which includes volleyball, soccer, softball, and basketball.

=== School Festivals ===
Hanyoung is known for its abundance of school festivals throughout the academic year. There are mainly two large festivals for each semester: HYFIVE (문화제, literally Culture Festival) and Field Day (체육대회). HYFIVE normally consists of a variety of games and activities organized by department, relating to the country the students are majoring in. The festival is capped off with plays performed by students from each department, with the entirety of the school student population attending.

Field Day is known for breeding and stimulating intense, energetic competition from students. Students take part in various sport and activities, representing their departments, such as soccer, kickball, volleyball, dodge ball etc. Field Day is held outside of school for two days.

Other festivals consist of Hanyoung Music Festival, a choir competition, regular sporting matches between departments, a three-day trip for first-year students, Club Day, and others.

=== Academic Competition ===
Hanyoung also holds numerous academic competitions throughout the school year. The competitions consist of, but are not limited to:

- History reading competition
- Society reading competition
- Writing competition
- Math competition
- English competition
- Geography competition
- Foreign Language competition
- HYCED (English Debate Competition)
- Debate competition
- HYMUN (Model United Nations)

== Reputation ==
=== College admission ===
In 2005 Hanyoung had the highest percentage of graduates going on to: Seoul National University, Yonsei University, Korea University, Ewha Womans University, Sogang University and Hanyang University.

In 2017, Hanyoung placed 13th in the national high school rankings based on the number of graduates going on to Seoul National University. Hanyoung sent 32 students to Seoul National University in that academic year. This is a remarkable result, as foreign language high school students only go into areas such as; social sciences, humanities and languages majors.
