= Camp Humphreys =

United States Army garrison in South Korea

United States Army Garrison Humphreys
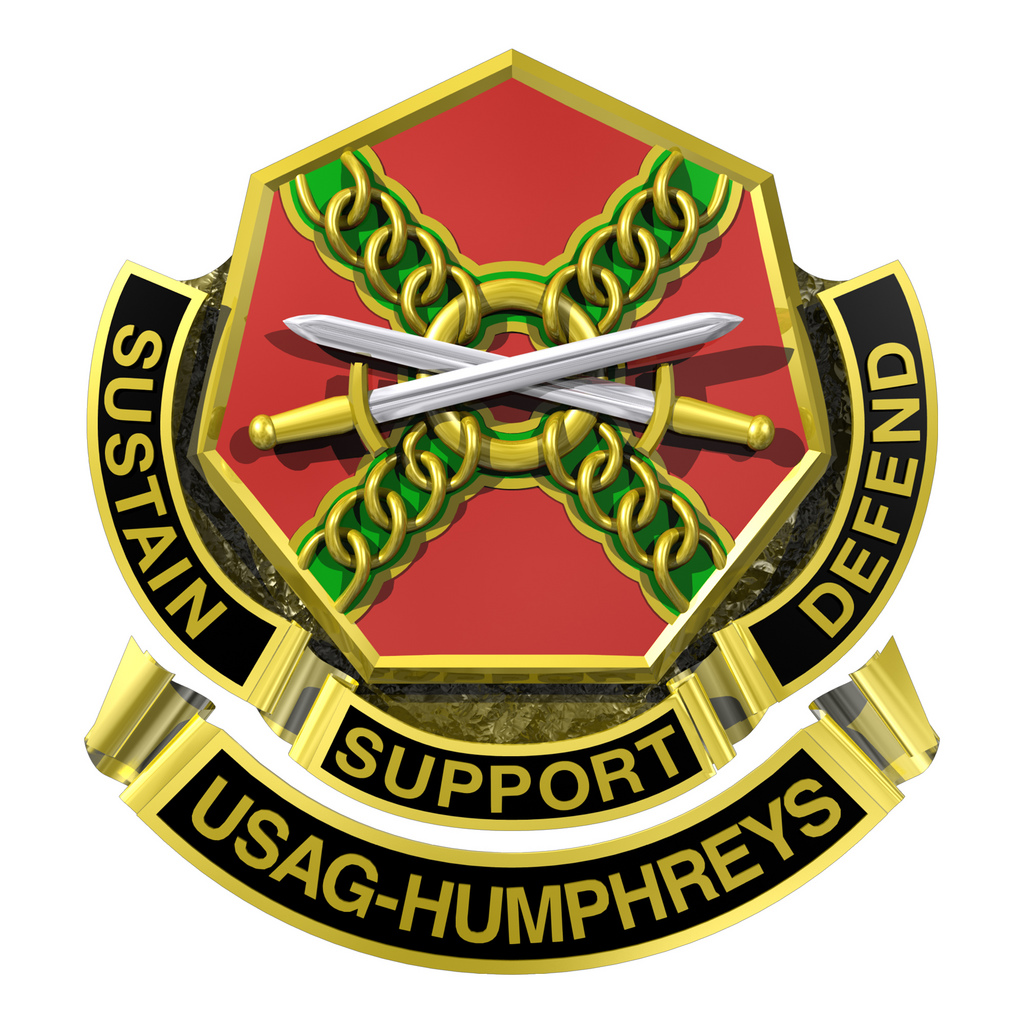
- Distinctive unit insignia of Camp Humphreys
- Founded: 1950
- Country: United States; South Korea
- Branch: United States Army
- Type: Garrison
- Part of: Department of Defense: Department of the Army; Installation Management Command
- Nickname: "We are the Army's Home"
- Mottos: "Sustain, Support, Defend"
- Colors: Red, green, black & gold
- Website: home.army.mil/humphreys/index.php/?from=wiki

Commanders
- Garrison Commander: Colonel Kristin E. Steinbrecher
- Deputy to the Garrison Commander: Mr. David M. Hancock
- Garrison Command Sergeant Major: Command Sergeant Major Monty C. Drummond

Desiderio Army Airfield A-511
- IATA: none; ICAO: RKSG

Summary
- Airport type: Military
- Operator: United States Army
- Location: Pyeongtaek
- Elevation AMSL: 53 ft (16 m)
- Coordinates: 36°57′38.4″N 127°02′01″E

Map
- Location in South Korea

Runways
Direction	Length		Surface
Direction	ft	m	Surface
14/32	8,124	2,476	Asphalt
- Sources: DoD FLIP

Camp Humphreys (Korean: 캠프 험프리스), also known as United States Army Garrison-Humphreys (USAG-H), is a United States Army garrison located near Anjeong-ri and Pyeongtaek metropolitan areas in South Korea. Camp Humphreys is home to Desiderio Army Airfield, the busiest U.S. Army airfield in Asia, with an 8,124-foot (2,476 m) runway. In addition to the airfield, there are several U.S. Army direct support, transportation, and tactical units located there, including the Combat Aviation Brigade, 2nd Infantry Division. The garrison has an area of 3,454 acres (1,398 ha) and cost US$11 billion. Camp Humphreys is the largest U.S. overseas military base, housing some 500 buildings and amenities.

In 2004, an agreement was reached between the United States and South Korean governments to move all U.S. forces to garrisons south of the Han River and relocate the United States Forces Korea and United Nations Command Headquarters to Camp Humphreys. Those movements were completed in 2018, and transformed Camp Humphreys into the largest U.S. Army garrison in Asia. Under that plan, the 28,500 U.S. troop presence in South Korea was consolidated and United States Forces Korea moved from Yongsan Garrison in Seoul to Camp Humphreys. Camp Humphreys is 40 miles (64 km) south of the former base in Seoul and about 60 miles (97 km) from the Demilitarized Zone (DMZ) that divides North Korea and South Korea. That puts the base about twice as far from North Korea as its predecessor, one of the main reasons for the move. While the new location moves the bulk of U.S. troops out of the range of North Korean artillery, the North Korean military has developed large caliber rockets and ballistic missiles, as well as a nuclear capability, capable of reaching Camp Humphreys.

== Geography ==
The town of Anjeong-ri is located adjacent to the Camp Humphreys main gate. Smaller farming villages are located along the perimeter.

The installation covered an area of 1,210 acres (490 ha), but as part of the Yongsan Relocation Plan that number has grown by 2,328 acres (942 ha) to 3,538 acres (1,432 ha).

The immediate area around Camp Humphreys is mostly agricultural and consists mainly of rice fields. There are some rolling hills in the vicinity, but for the most part the elevations are less than 150 feet (46 m). There is a small mountain range about 7 miles (11 km) south of Camp Humphreys, with peaks reaching 958 feet (292 m) in elevation. Larger mountains are located to the northeast, east, and southwest, all within 20 miles (32 km) with peaks reaching to 2,293 feet (699 m) in elevation to the south and 1,000 feet (300 m) in elevation to the southeast. Urban areas are situated mostly to the northeast of the airfield. Seoul is located approximately 55 miles (89 km) northeast.

The Ansong River flows from the east to west toward the West Sea and passes three miles northwest of the airfield. About 12 miles (19 km) west of Camp Humphreys, the river widens and empties into the Asan Bay, near Koon-ni Range.

The numerous areas of water around Camp Humphreys have an effect on the weather. The abundant moisture is responsible for most of the fog and stratus which occurs in the area. This is especially true from the spring through fall.

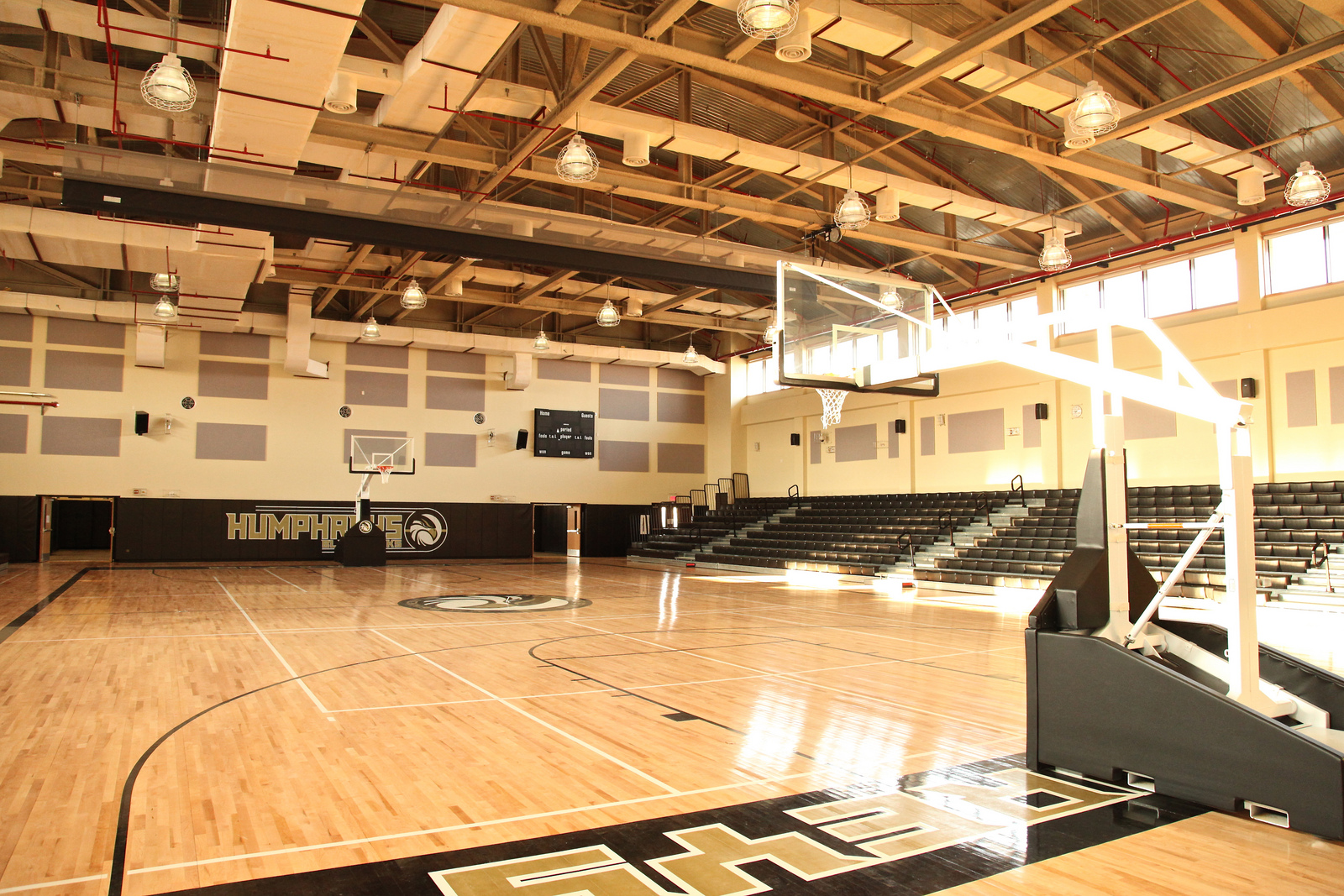
Camp Humphreys Middle/High School gymnasium

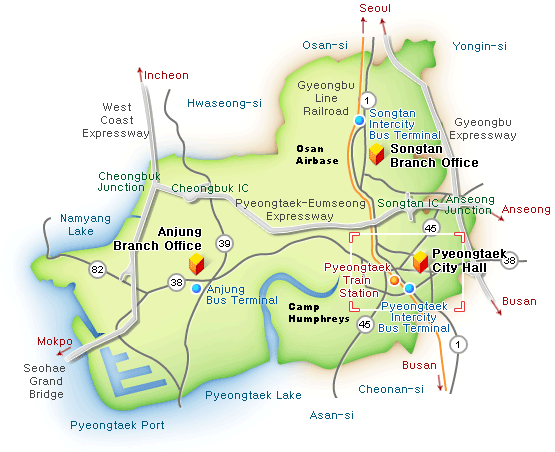
Map of Pyeongtaek showing location of Camp Humphreys

== History ==
The history of Camp Humphreys dates back to 1919, when the Japanese military built the Pyeongtaek Airfield. During the Korean War, Pyeongtaek Airfield was named K-6 after being repaired and enhanced by the U.S. Air Force to accommodate a U.S. Marine Air Group and the 614th Tactical Control Group.

=== 1960s ===
In 1962, the base was renamed Camp Humphreys in honor of Chief Warrant Officer Benjamin K. Humphreys, a pilot assigned to the 6th Transportation Company, who died in a helicopter accident.

In 1964, Humphreys District command (later re-designated as the 23rd Direct Support Group) was activated as a separate installation command of the Eighth U.S. Army, providing all direct support, supply and maintenance, storage of all conventional ammunition in Korea, Adjutant General publications and training aides and the Eighth U.S. Army Milk Plant.

=== 1970s ===
In 1974, with the activation of the 19th Support Brigade, Camp Humphreys was redesignated as U.S. Army Garrison, Camp Humphreys. USAG-Camp Humphreys was still responsible for all affairs affecting personnel stationed at Camp Humphreys, but the 19th Support Command was responsible for all support activities vital to the Eighth U.S. Army and its subordinate units. Those units formerly reporting to the 23rd Direct Support Group reported to the 19th Support Command in Daegu. Only the basic functions remained with USAG Camp Humphreys.

=== 1990s ===
Later, the 23rd Direct Support Group and 19th Support were renamed the 23rd Support Group and 19th Theater Army Area Command. On 17 June 1996, the United States Army Support Activity Area III (USASA Area III) was established and made responsible for the peacetime support mission for Camp Humphreys, Camp Long, Camp Eagle and U.S. Army units assigned to Suwon Airbase.

=== 2000s ===
Camps Eagle and Long closed on 4 June 2010, consolidating installation support activities at Camp Humphreys.

==== 2005 protests ====
The Daechuri Protests were a series of large protests against the South Korean and American governments' plan to expand Camp Humphreys to make it the main base for most U.S. troops in South Korea. It concluded when residents of Daechuri and other small villages near Pyeongtaek agreed to a government settlement according to which they would leave their homes in 2006 and allow the base expansion. Compensation for the land averaged 600 million won (about US$600,000) per resident.

Under a 2004 land-swap pact, the U.S. promised to gradually return a combined 170 square kilometers of land housing 42 military bases and related facilities to South Korea and move U.S. military forces from garrisons in and north of Seoul to Camp Humphreys.

With the creation of the Installation Management Command on 24 October 2006, U.S. Army Support Activity Area III was redesignated as U.S. Army Garrison Humphreys and Area III on 15 March 2007.

On 13 November 2007, USFK and South Korean officials conducted a groundbreaking ceremony for the expansion of Camp Humphreys. Under that plan, the 28,500 U.S. troops in South Korea would be consolidated into two regional hubs in Pyeongtaek and Daegu by 2016.

=== 2010s ===
In 2010, the U.S. Army announced that a tour normalization policy would gradually be introduced. Single soldiers would typically serve two-year tours, and troops who brought families would stay for three years. Previously most troops served one-year unaccompanied tours in Korea. Additional infrastructure to accommodate more families would be built.

On 2 September 2011, U.S. and South Korean officials participated in a joint groundbreaking ceremony to mark the beginning of construction for an elementary school to accommodate 850 students and a high school to accommodate 950 students on Camp Humphreys. On 26 August 2013, Camp Humphreys opened a new elementary school. The new elementary school will hold kindergarten through fifth-grade classes for a total enrollment capacity of 875 students.

As of 2017 the U.S. Army called Humphreys "the largest power projection platform in the Pacific". With the final stage of base expansion completed around 2020, Humphreys had tripled in size to nearly 3,500 acres, making it the largest U.S. overseas military base. To accommodate more families, up to twelve 12-story housing towers were built. The population of Humphreys is expected to exceed 45,000. Up to 93% of the $10.7 billion expansion cost was paid by South Korea under a 2014 Special Measures Agreement.

== Garrison units ==
The following are based at Camp Humphreys:

- United States Forces Korea
- United Nations Command
- Combined Forces Command
- Special Operations Command Korea
- United States Marine Corps Forces, Korea
- Eighth United States Army
- 2nd Infantry Division
- Installation Management Command Pacific – Forward
- 2nd Combat Aviation Brigade
- 604th Air Support Operations Squadron
- 65th Medical Brigade
- United States Army Medical Department Activities Korea
- 501st Military Intelligence Brigade
- 1st Signal Brigade
- 411th Contract Support Brigade
- Armored Brigade Combat Team – Rotational unit
- Far East District of the United States Army Corps of Engineers
- 7th Republic of Korea Air Force Communication Service Group
- Trial Defense Services
- Defense Logistics Agency
- American Forces Network Humphreys, Defense Media Activity
- Army Materiel Command Logistics Support Element
- United States Army Pacific Support Unit
- 4-58th Airfield Operations Battalion
- 11th Engineer Battalion
- 23rd Chemical Battalion
- 602nd Aviation Support Battalion
- 4th Attack Reconnaissance Battalion, 2nd Aviation Regiment
- 2nd Assault Battalion, 2nd Aviation Regiment
- 3rd General Support Aviation Battalion 2nd Aviation Regiment
- 194th Combat Sustainment Support Battalion
- 94th Military Police Battalion
- 3rd Military Intelligence Battalion: RC-12X, RC-7
- 524th Military Intelligence Battalion
- 532nd Military Intelligence Battalion
- 719th Military Intelligence Battalion
- Heavy Attack Recon Squadron – Rotational unit
- 718th Explosive Ordnance Disposal Company
- 568th Medical Company
- 618th Dental Company
- 106th Veterinary Company
- 339th Quartermaster Company
- 501st Signal Company
- 19th Human Resource Company
- 520th Ordinance Company
- 142nd Military Police Company
- 557th Military Police Company
- 8th Korean Service Corps Company
- 22nd Korean Service Corps Company
- Charlie Battery, 6th Battalion, 52nd Air Defense Artillery Regiment
- Headquarters and Headquarters Company, United States Army Garrison Humphreys
- Detachment 2, 607th Weather Squadron, United States Air Force
- Detachment Alpha, Bravo and Headquarters and Headquarters Company, 176th Finance Battalion
- 20th Public Affairs Detachment
- 5th Medical Detachment
- 95th Medical Detachment (Blood)
- 20th Military Police Detachment (CID)
- 503rd Military Working Dog Detachment
- 138 Movement Control Team
- 662nd Movement Control Team
- US Army Correctional Activity – Korea
- 2ID DIVARTY
- 658th Regional Support Group

=== Department of Defense Dependent Schools ===
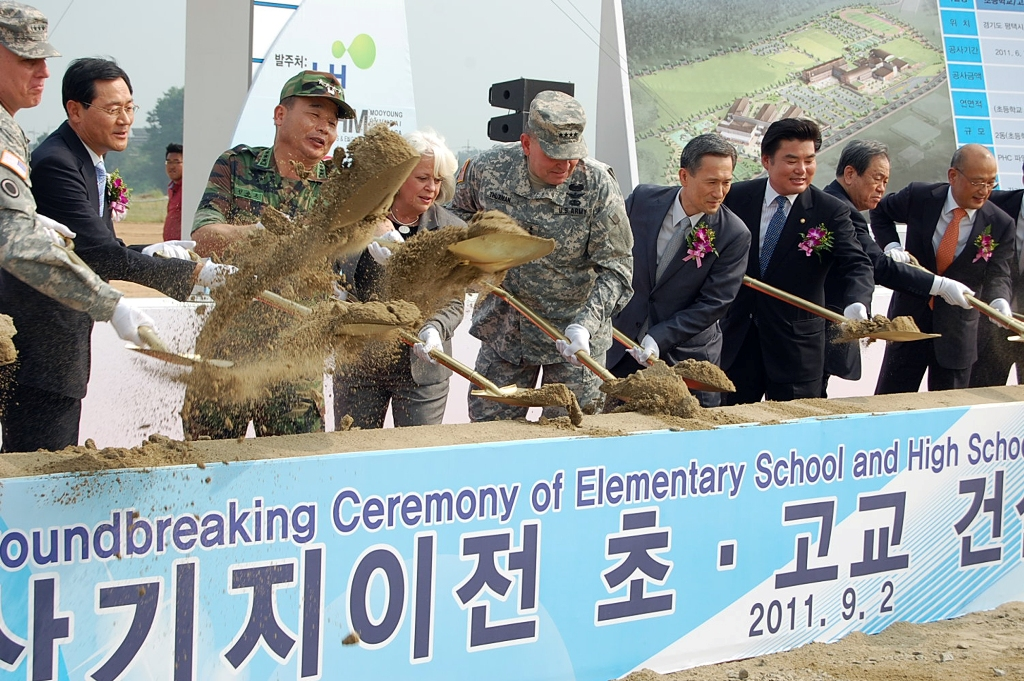
Gen. James Thurman, United States Forces Korea, or USFK, commander (center), participates in a groundbreaking ceremony 2 Sept. 2011, in Pyeongtaek, South Korea, marking the beginning of construction for elementary and high schools for Camp Humphreys. The schools will serve approximately 1,700 students, beginning in June 2013. This $85 million project is being funded by South Korea as part of its commitment to the Yongsan Relocation Plan.

The Department of Defense Education Activity (DoDEA) is a civilian agency of the United States Department of Defense that manages all schools for military children and teenagers, as well as foreign service children and teenagers, in the United States and also overseas at American military bases worldwide.

DoDEA currently manages four schools on Camp Humphreys. They include Humphreys Central and West Elementary Schools, Humphreys Middle School and Humphreys High School.

In 2011, construction began on Camp Humphreys for a new central elementary and high school. In 2013, construction completed on the new schools and adjacent athletic fields, which accommodate 1,700 students. Humphreys Central Elementary School can accommodate 850 students, with the high school accommodating 950. The elementary school serves kindergarten through 4th grade classes, the existing middle school serves 5th to 8th grades, and the high school covers 9th through 12th grades.

=== Post exchange ===
Camp Humphreys is home to a 72,000 square foot concession mall, with laundry and dry cleaning services, an optical shop, domestic wireless and internet service providers, barber shop, florist, embroidery, giftware vendors and more. As of February 2020, the Main Exchange food court offers Popeyes Chicken, Taco Bell, Arby's, Burger King, Pizza Hut, Manchu Wok, Charleys Philly Steaks, Starbucks, Smoothie King, Auntie Anne's and Baskin Robbins. Pizza Hut and Popeyes also offer daily delivery service.

There are also three shoppettes on Camp Humphreys. The Zoeckler Station shoppette is located near the main gate by the Katusa snack bar and Pizza Hut. Pizza Hut offers delivery service daily for on-post residents. Also located near this facility, across from the walk-thru gate, is laundry/dry cleaning service and a barber shop. The 3rd MI shoppette is located in the same building as Charley's Steakery, which serves a selection of sub sandwiches.

The post movie theater seats more than 550 customers and offers the latest movies in digital sound. The theater was recognized in 2011 as the "Best in the Army."

A 24-hour laundromat is located adjacent to the walk-thru gate to Camp Humphreys.

Korea is a ration control assignment. Upon arrival, military personnel, family members and civilian employees need to get a ration control card from their local Pass and ID Office prior to shopping in an AAFES facility. Department of Defense identification cards and ration control cards are always necessary to make purchases at all AAFES facilities in South Korea.

=== Army Medicine ===
The Camp Humphreys Army Health Clinic provides outpatient primary care services to active duty service members and their families living in the Pyongtaek area. Patients must be enrolled in the clinic via TRICARE and assigned a primary care provider prior to scheduling appointments.

In September 2019, the Brian D. Allgood Army Community Hospital (BAACH) completed its relocation from Yongsan. This brings the full capabilities of an Army hospital to Camp Humphreys. Major services include general medical and surgical care, adult and pediatric primary care clinics, specialty clinics, clinical services, wellness and prevention services

== Education ==
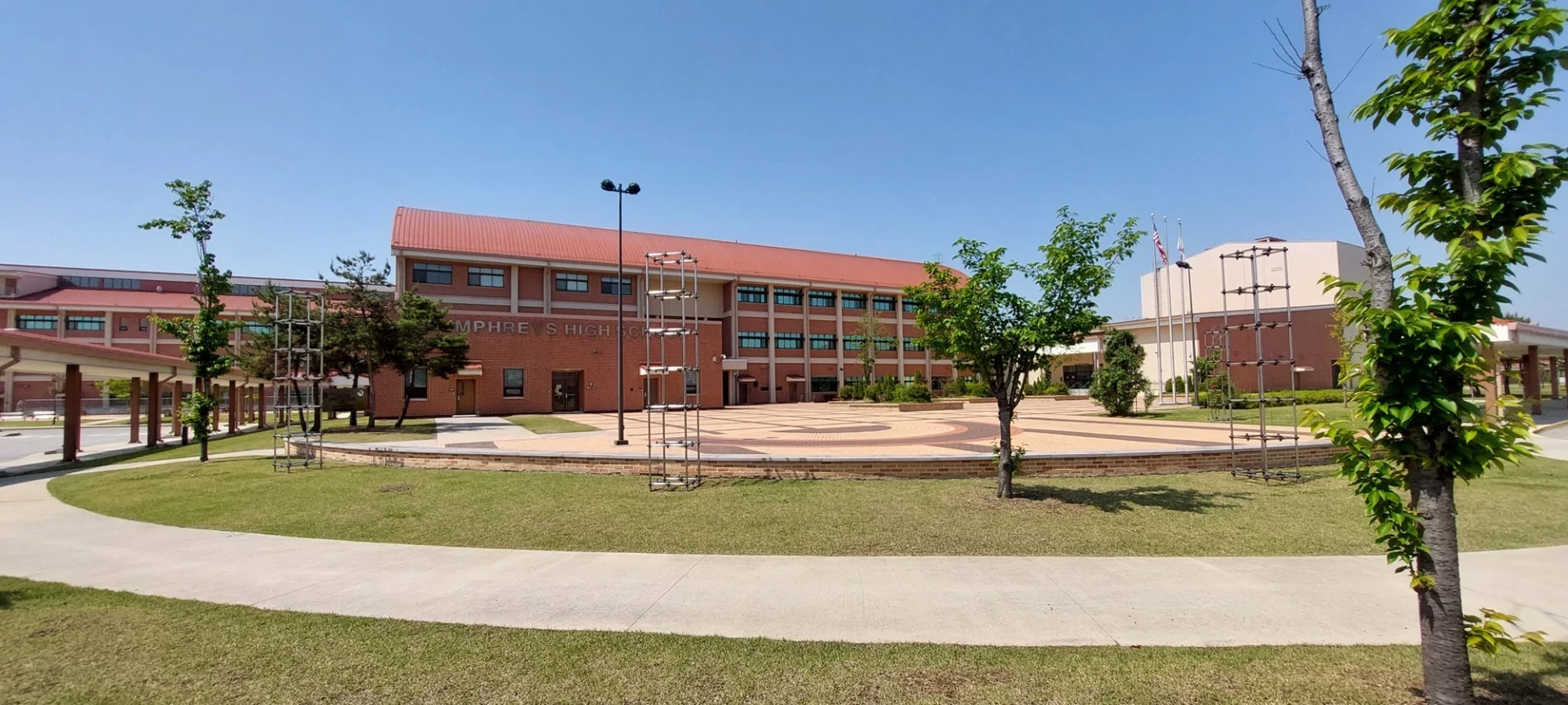
Humphreys High School

The Department of Defense Education Activity (DoDEA) operates:

- Humphreys High School
- Humphreys Middle School
- Humphreys Central Elementary School
- Humphreys West Elementary School

== In popular culture ==
- Camp Humphreys is featured in the 2013 film World War Z.

== See also ==
- List of United States Army installations in South Korea
